= 2014 Tennessee Titans season =

55th season in franchise history

- Owner: KSA Industries
- General manager: Ruston Webster
- Head coach: Ken Whisenhunt
- Home stadium: LP Field

Results
- Record: 2–14
- Division place: 4th AFC South
- Playoffs: Did not qualify
- Pro Bowlers: None

Uniform
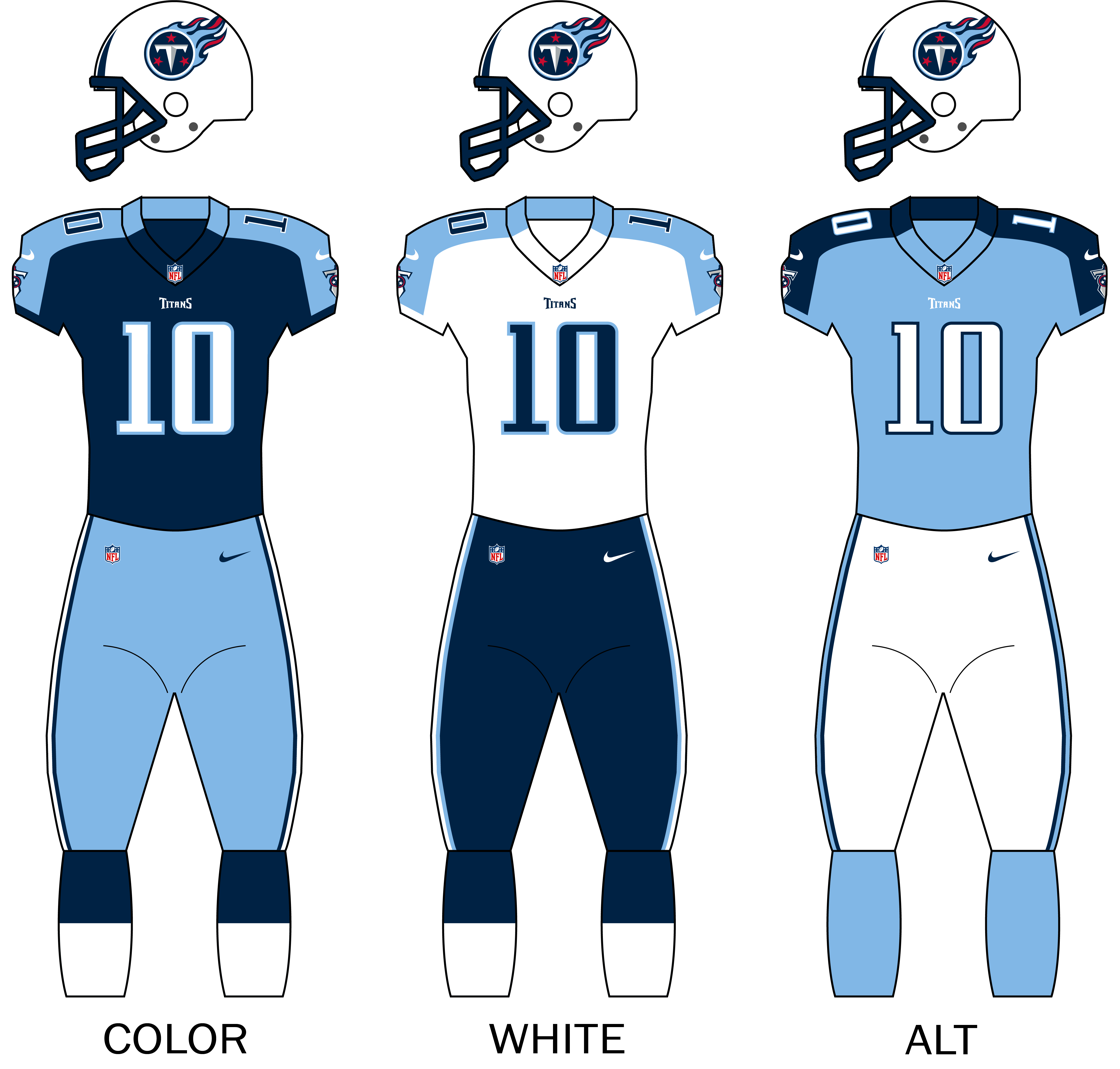

The 2014 season was the Tennessee Titans' 45th in the National Football League (NFL), their 55th overall and their 18th in the state of Tennessee. It was also their first season under head coach Ken Whisenhunt, as well as the first full season since the death of longtime owner Bud Adams, who died during the 2013 season. The Titans finished the season with 10 consecutive losses to finish with a 2–14 record, not only tying the Tampa Bay Buccaneers for the league's worst record, but also the Titans' worst season since 1994, when the franchise was known as the Houston Oilers.

== 2014 draft class ==
2014 Tennessee Titans Draft
Round	Selection	Player	Position	College
1	11	Taylor Lewan	Offensive tackle	Michigan
2	54	Bishop Sankey	Running back	Washington
3	None — see draft trades below			
4	112	DaQuan Jones	Defensive tackle	Penn State
4	122	Marqueston Huff	Safety	Wyoming
5	151	Avery Williamson	Linebacker	Kentucky
6	178	Zach Mettenberger	Quarterback	LSU
7	None — see draft trades below			

Draft trades

- The Titans traded their original second-round selection (No. 42 overall) to the Philadelphia Eagles in exchange for the Eagles' second- and fourth-round selections (Nos. 54 and 122 overall, respectively).
- The Titans traded their third-round selection (No. 77 overall), along with their 2013 second- and seventh-round selections to the San Francisco 49ers in exchange for the 49ers' 2013 second-round selection.
- The Titans traded their sixth- and seventh-round selections (Nos. 186 and 228 overall, respectively) to the Washington Redskins in exchange for the Redskins' sixth-round selection (No. 178 overall).

== Staff ==
2014 Tennessee Titans staff
Front office: Owner – KSA Industries; Co-chairman – Susie Adams Smith; President/chairman/CEO – Thomas Smith; Executive vice president/general manager – Ruston Webster; Assistant director of football administration – Dennis Polian; Vice president of player personnel – Lake Dawson; Vice president of football administration – Vin Marino; Director of college scouting – Blake Beddingfield; Director of pro scouting – Brian Gardner; Head coaches: Head coach – Ken Whisenhunt; Offensive coaches: Offensive coordinator – Jason Michael; Quarterbacks – John McNulty; Running backs – Sylvester Croom; Wide receivers – Shawn Jefferson; Assistant wide receivers – Kevin Patullo; Tight ends – Mike Mularkey; Assistant tight ends – Arthur Smith; Offensive line – Bob Bostad; Assistant offensive line – Mike Sullivan; Offensive assistant – Luke Steckel	Defensive coaches: Defensive coordinator – Ray Horton; Defensive line – Giff Smith; Assistant defensive line – Nick Eason; Linebackers – Lou Spanos; Defensive Backs − Louie Cioffi; Assistant secondary – Steve Brown; Defensive quality control – Cannon Matthews; Special teams coaches: Special teams – Nate Kaczor; Assistant special teams – Steve Hoffman

== Final roster ==
2014 Tennessee Titans roster
Quarterbacks (QB): 7 Zach Mettenberger; 5 Jordan Palmer; 12 Charlie Whitehurst; Running backs (RB): 26 Antonio Andrews; 44 Jackie Battle FB; 23 Shonn Greene; 20 Bishop Sankey; 29 Leon Washington; Wide receivers (WR): 17 Kris Durham; 80 Derek Hagan; 83 Rico Richardson; 85 Nate Washington; 13 Kendall Wright; Tight ends (TE): 86 Chase Coffman; 89 Matthew Mulligan; 82 Delanie Walker	Offensive linemen (OL): 75 Terren Jones T; 67 Andy Levitre G; 77 Taylor Lewan T; 79 Jamon Meredith T; 66 Eric Olsen G; 60 Chris Spencer C/G; 68 Byron Stingily T; 76 Will Svitek T; 70 Chance Warmack G; Defensive linemen (DL): 99 Jurrell Casey DE; 94 Sammie Lee Hill NT; 90 DaQuan Jones DE; 97 Karl Klug DE; 93 Mike Martin DE; 92 Ropati Pitoitua DE; 96 Al Woods NT	Linebackers (LB): 58 Kaelin Burnett OLB; 50 Zaviar Gooden ILB; 53 Quentin Groves OLB; 56 Dontay Moch OLB; 91 Derrick Morgan OLB; 57 Justin Staples OLB; 54 Avery Williamson ILB; 95 Kamerion Wimbley OLB; 59 Wesley Woodyard ILB; Defensive backs (DB): 33 Michael Griffin FS; 32 Brandon Harris CB; 28 Marqueston Huff SS; 30 Jason McCourty CB; 24 Coty Sensabaugh CB; 39 Daimion Stafford FS; 35 Jemea Thomas CB; 21 George Wilson SS; 36 Khalid Wooten CB; Special teams (ST): 48 Beau Brinkley LS; 6 Brett Kern P; 8 Ryan Succop K	Practice squad: 26 Ri'Shard Anderson CB; 78 Chigbo Anunoby NT; 51 Nate Askew LB; 64 Justin McCray G; 14 Derek Moye WR; 73 Will Poehls T; 37 Lache Seastrunk RB; 47 Yawin Smallwood LB; 49 Chaz Sutton LB; 11 Alex Tanney QB; Reserve: 87 Brett Brackett TE (IR); 55 Zach Brown ILB (IR); 15 Justin Hunter WR (IR); 61 Gabe Ikard C (IR); 10 Jake Locker QB (IR); 52 Colin McCarthy ILB (IR); 22 Dexter McCluster RB (IR); 72 Michael Oher T (IR); 31 Bernard Pollard SS (IR); 71 Michael Roos T (IR); 62 Brian Schwenke C (IR); 88 Craig Stevens TE (IR); 81 Josh Stewart WR (IR); 84 Taylor Thompson TE (IR); 25 Blidi Wreh-Wilson CB (IR); Rookies in italics 53 active, 15 reserve, 10 practice squad

=== Team captains ===
The Titans named five captains by player vote and stated that the sixth captain spot would be a rotating process.

- Jake Locker (QB)
- Nate Washington (WR)
- Jurrell Casey (DE)
- Wesley Woodyard (LB)
- George Wilson (ST)

== Schedule ==
=== Preseason ===
Week	Date	Opponent	Result	Record	Venue	Recap
1	August 9	Green Bay Packers	**W** 20–16	1–0	LP Field	Recap
2	August 15	at New Orleans Saints	**L** 24–31	1–1	Mercedes-Benz Superdome	Recap
3	August 23	at Atlanta Falcons	**W** 24–17	2–1	Georgia Dome	Recap
4	August 28	Minnesota Vikings	**L** 3–19	2–2	LP Field	Recap

=== Regular season ===
Week	Date	Opponent	Result	Record	Venue	Recap
1	September 7	at Kansas City Chiefs	**W** 26–10	1–0	Arrowhead Stadium	Recap
2	September 14	Dallas Cowboys	**L** 10–26	1–1	LP Field	Recap
3	September 21	at Cincinnati Bengals	**L** 7–33	1–2	Paul Brown Stadium	Recap
4	September 28	at **Indianapolis Colts**	**L** 17–41	1–3	Lucas Oil Stadium	Recap
5	October 5	Cleveland Browns	**L** 28–29	1–4	LP Field	Recap
6	October 12	**Jacksonville Jaguars**	**W** 16–14	2–4	LP Field	Recap
7	October 19	at Washington Redskins	**L** 17–19	2–5	FedExField	Recap
8	October 26	**Houston Texans**	**L** 16–30	2–6	LP Field	Recap
9	Bye					
10	November 9	at Baltimore Ravens	**L** 7–21	2–7	M&T Bank Stadium	Recap
11	November 17	Pittsburgh Steelers	**L** 24–27	2–8	LP Field	Recap
12	November 23	at Philadelphia Eagles	**L** 24–43	2–9	Lincoln Financial Field	Recap
13	November 30	at **Houston Texans**	**L** 21–45	2–10	NRG Stadium	Recap
14	December 7	New York Giants	**L** 7–36	2–11	LP Field	Recap
15	December 14	New York Jets	**L** 11–16	2–12	LP Field	Recap
16	December 18	at **Jacksonville Jaguars**	**L** 13–21	2–13	EverBank Field	Recap
17	December 28	**Indianapolis Colts**	**L** 10–27	2–14	LP Field	Recap

Note: Intra-division opponents are in bold text.

=== Game summaries ===
==== Week 1: at Kansas City Chiefs ====
Week One: Tennessee Titans at Kansas City Chiefs – Game summary

Quarter	1	2	3	4	Total
**Titans**	0	10	10	6	**26**
Chiefs	0	3	0	7	**10**

at Arrowhead Stadium, Kansas City, Missouri

- Date: September 7, 2014
- Game time: 12:00 p.m. CDT
- Game weather: 69 °F (21 °C), sunny
- Game attendance: 73,569
- Referee: Ron Torbert
- TV announcers (CBS): Kevin Harlan and Rich Gannon
- Recap, Gamebook

Game information

**First quarter**

- No scoring plays.

**Second quarter**

- KC – Cairo Santos 35-yard field goal, 13:40. Chiefs 3–0. **Drive: 8 plays, 64 yards, 4:18.**
- TEN – Delanie Walker 5-yard pass from Jake Locker (Ryan Succop kick), 3:37. Titans 7–3. **Drive: 11 plays, 62 yards, 6:30.**
- TEN – Ryan Succop 36-yard field goal, 0:07. Titans 10–3. **Drive: 4 plays, 24 yards, 0:25.**

**Third quarter**

- TEN – Kendall Wright 6-yard pass from Jake Locker (Ryan Succop kick), 10:31. Titans 17–3. **Drive: 9 plays, 80 yards, 4:34.**
- TEN – Ryan Succop 31-yard field goal, 2:50. Titans 20–3. **Drive: 9 plays, 45 yards, 3:45.**

**Fourth quarter**

- TEN – Ryan Succop 46-yard field goal, 12:43. Titans 23–3. **Drive: 7 plays, 16 yards, 3:47.**
- KC – Anthony Fasano 5-yard pass from Alex Smith (Cairo Santos kick), 10:16. Titans 23–10. **Drive: 10 plays, 83 yards, 2:30.**
- TEN – Ryan Succop 47-yard field goal, 4:54. Titans 26–10. **Drive: 10 plays, 51 yards, 5:19.**

**Top passers**

- TEN – Jake Locker – 22/33, 266 yards, 2 TD
- KC – Alex Smith – 19/35, 202 yards, TD, 3 INT

**Top rushers**

- TEN – Shonn Greene – 15 rushes, 71 yards
- KC – Alex Smith – 6 rushes, 36 yards

**Top receivers**

- TEN – Justin Hunter – 3 receptions, 63 yards
- KC – Donnie Avery – 7 receptions, 84 yards

**Top tacklers**

- TEN – Wesley Woodyard – 5 tackles (1 sack)
- KC – Eric Berry – 14 tackles, 1 assist, 1 pass defended

With the stunning win over the struggling Chiefs, the Titans started their season at 1-0.

==== Week 2: vs. Dallas Cowboys ====
Week Two: Dallas Cowboys at Tennessee Titans – Game summary

Quarter	1	2	3	4	Total
**Cowboys**	3	13	7	3	**26**
Titans	0	0	10	0	**10**

at LP Field, Nashville, Tennessee

- Date: September 14, 2014
- Game time: 12:00 p.m. CDT
- Game weather: 77 °F (25 °C), (Sunny)
- Game attendance: 69,143
- Referee: Walt Coleman
- TV announcers (Fox): Joe Buck, Troy Aikman and Erin Andrews
- Recap, Gamebook

Game information

**First quarter**

- DAL – Dan Bailey 48-yard field goal, 0:13. Cowboys 3–0. **Drive: 11 plays, 50 yards, 6:59.**

**Second quarter**

- DAL – DeMarco Murray 3-yard run (Dan Bailey kick), 12:54. Cowboys 10–0. **Drive: 4 plays, 40 yards, 1:49.**
- DAL – Dan Bailey 44-yard field goal, 1:02. Cowboys 13–0. **Drive: 8 plays, 34 yards, 2:54.**
- DAL – Dan Bailey 51-yard field goal, 0:04. Cowboys 16–0. **Drive: 4 plays, 15 yards, 0:19.**

**Third quarter**

- TEN – Ryan Succop 47-yard field goal, 10:57. Cowboys 16–3. **Drive: 9 plays, 63 yards, 4:03.**
- TEN – Delanie Walker 61-yard pass from Jake Locker (Ryan Succop kick), 7:45. Cowboys 16–10. **Drive: 3 plays, 68 yards, 1:25.**
- DAL – Dez Bryant 3-yard pass from Tony Romo (Dan Bailey kick), 2:09. Cowboys 23–10. **Drive: 12 plays, 80 yards, 5:36.**

**Fourth quarter**

- DAL – Dan Bailey 48-yard field goal, 8:15. Cowboys 26–10. **Drive: 11 plays, 38 yards, 6:08.**

**Top passers**

- DAL – Tony Romo – 19/29, 176 yards, TD
- TEN – Jake Locker – 18/34, 234 yards, TD, 2 INT

**Top rushers**

- DAL – DeMarco Murray – 29 rushes, 167 yards, TD
- TEN – Shonn Greene – 5 rushes, 40 yards

**Top receivers**

- DAL – Dez Bryant – 10 receptions, 103 yards, TD
- TEN – Delanie Walker – 10 receptions, 142 yards, TD

The Cowboys routed the Titans 26-10, en route to the Cowboys' six game winning streak. With the loss, Tennessee fell to 1-1.

==== Week 3: at Cincinnati Bengals ====
Week Three: Tennessee Titans at Cincinnati Bengals – Game summary

Quarter	1	2	3	4	Total
Titans	0	0	0	7	**7**
**Bengals**	10	9	7	7	**33**

at Paul Brown Stadium, Cincinnati, Ohio

- Date: September 21, 2014
- Game time: 1:00 p.m. EDT/12:00 p.m. CDT
- Game weather: 74 °F (23 °C), mostly cloudy
- Game attendance: 56,743
- Referee: Brad Allen
- TV announcers (CBS): Brad Johansen and Chris Simms
- Recap, Gamebook

Game information

**First quarter**

- CIN – Mike Nugent 29-yard field goal, 4:48. Bengals 3–0. **Drive: 9 plays, 59 yards, 4:03.**
- CIN – Andy Dalton 18-yard pass from Mohamed Sanu (Mike Nugent kick), 0:00. Bengals 10–0. **Drive: 5 plays, 73 yards, 2:35.**

**Second quarter**

- CIN – Penalty on Quentin Groves enforced in end zone for a safety, 6:25. Bengals 12–0.
- CIN – Giovani Bernard 1-yard run (Mike Nugent kick), 3:29. Bengals 19–0. **Drive: 1 play, 17 yards, 0:09.**

**Third quarter**

- CIN – Giovani Bernard 1-yard run (Mike Nugent kick), 1:58. Bengals 26–0. **Drive: 14 plays, 80 yards, 7:18.**

**Fourth quarter**

- CIN – Jeremy Hill 4-yard run (Mike Nugent kick), 9:26. Bengals 33–0. **Drive: 8 plays, 76 yards, 4:07.**
- TEN – Shonn Greene 1-yard run (Ryan Succop kick), 6:09. Bengals 33–7. **Drive: 6 plays, 80 yards, 3:17.**

**Top passers**

- TEN – Jake Locker – 17/34, 185 yards, 2 INT
- CIN – Andy Dalton – 15/23, 169 yards, INT

**Top rushers**

- TEN – Bishop Sankey – 10 rushes, 61 yards
- CIN – Giovani Bernard – 14 rushes, 47 yards, 2 TD

**Top receivers**

- TEN – Delanie Walker – 4 receptions, 54 yards
- CIN – A. J. Green – 6 receptions, 102 yards

The Bengals rolled over the Titans, 33-7. It was all Bengals from the beginning. They humiliated Tennessee, simply destroying them. With the humiliating loss, Tennessee fell to 1-2.

==== Week 4: at Indianapolis Colts ====
Week Four: Tennessee Titans at Indianapolis Colts – Game summary

Quarter	1	2	3	4	Total
Titans	0	10	7	0	**17**
**Colts**	14	6	14	7	**41**

at Lucas Oil Stadium, Indianapolis, Indiana

- Date: September 28, 2014
- Game time: 1:00 p.m. EDT/12:00 p.m. CDT
- Game weather: 78 °F (26 °C), partly sunny (retractable roof open)
- Game attendance: 64,757
- Referee: Jerome Boger
- TV announcers (CBS): Kevin Harlan and Rich Gannon
- Recap, Gamebook

Game information

**First quarter**

- IND – Trent Richardson 1-yard run (Adam Vinatieri kick), 7:06. Colts 7–0. **Drive: 2 plays, 38 yards, 0:34.**
- IND – Dwayne Allen 7-yard pass from Andrew Luck (Adam Vinatieri kick), 0:52. Colts 14–0. **Drive: 11 plays, 44 yards, 6:14.**

**Second quarter**

- IND – Adam Vinatieri 31-yard field goal, 10:25. Colts 17–0. **Drive: 10 plays, 60 yards, 4:18.**
- TEN – Ryan Succop 36-yard field goal, 6:24. Colts 17–3. **Drive: 6 plays, 51 yards, 1:40.**
- IND – Adam Vinatieri 30-yard field goal, 1:53. Colts 20–3. **Drive: 10 plays, 65 yards, 4:31.**
- TEN – Delanie Walker 7-yard pass from Charlie Whitehurst (Ryan Succop kick), 0:13. Colts 20–10. **Drive: 3 plays, 25 yards, 0:32.**

**Third quarter**

- IND – Reggie Wayne 28-yard pass from Andrew Luck (Adam Vinatieri kick), 8:15. Colts 27–10. **Drive: 9 plays, 91 yards, 4:04.**
- IND – Coby Fleener 2-yard pass from Andrew Luck (Adam Vinatieri kick), 4:02. Colts 34–10. **Drive: 4 plays, 70 yards, 2:04.**
- TEN – Bishop Sankey 2-yard run (Ryan Succop kick), 0:35. Colts 34–17. **Drive: 8 plays, 80 yards, 3:27.**

**Fourth quarter**

- IND – Ahmad Bradshaw 15-yard pass from Andrew Luck (Adam Vinatieri kick), 9:56. Colts 41–17. **Drive: 10 plays, 80 yards, 5:39.**

**Top passers**

- TEN – Charlie Whitehurst – 12/23, 177 yards, TD, INT
- IND – Andrew Luck – 29/41, 393 yards, 4 TD, INT

**Top rushers**

- TEN – Charlie Whitehurst – 5 rushes, 40 yards
- IND – Trent Richardson – 20 rushes, 47 yards, TD

**Top receivers**

- TEN – Delanie Walker – 5 receptions, 84 yards, TD
- IND – Reggie Wayne – 7 receptions, 119 yards, TD

The Titans got blown out for a third straight week, losing to the rival Colts 41-17. This loss drops the Titans to 1-3 on the season, but they remain in third place in the AFC South, with the Jaguars' 33-14 loss to the Chargers.

==== Week 5: vs. Cleveland Browns ====
Week Five: Cleveland Browns at Tennessee Titans – Game summary

Quarter	1	2	3	4	Total
**Browns**	0	10	3	16	**29**
Titans	7	21	0	0	**28**

at LP Field, Nashville, Tennessee

- Date: October 5
- Game time: 12:00 p.m. CDT
- Game weather: 71 °F (22 °C), (Sunny)
- Game attendance: 69,143
- Referee: Gene Steratore
- TV announcers (CBS): Andrew Catalon, Steve Beuerlein and Steve Tasker
- Recap, Gamebook

Game information

**First quarter**

**Second quarter**

**Third quarter**

**Fourth quarter**

**Top passers**

- CLE –
- TEN –

**Top rushers**

- CLE –
- TEN –

**Top receivers**

- CLE –
- TEN –

**Top tacklers**

- CLE –
- TEN –

The Titans dominated the first half, leading 28-3 after two quarters. However, it wasn't enough, as the Browns stormed back in the second half to win 29-28. This was the largest road comeback in NFL history. With the bitter loss, the Titans fell to 1-4.

==== Week 6: vs. Jacksonville Jaguars ====
Week Six: Jacksonville Jaguars at Tennessee Titans – Game summary

Quarter	1	2	3	4	Total
Jaguars	7	0	0	7	**14**
**Titans**	3	7	3	3	**16**

at LP Field, Nashville, Tennessee

- Date: October 12
- Game time: 12:00 p.m. CDT
- Game weather: 73 °F (23 °C), (Cloudy)
- Game attendance: 69,143
- Referee: Jeff Triplette
- TV announcers (CBS): Andrew Catalon, Steve Beuerlein and Steve Tasker
- Recap, Gamebook

Game information

**First quarter**

**Second quarter**

**Third quarter**

**Fourth quarter**

**Top passers**

- JAX –
- TEN –

**Top rushers**

- JAX –
- TEN –

**Top receivers**

- JAX –
- TEN –

**Top tacklers**

- JAX –
- TEN –

Coming off their humiliating loss to the Browns, the Titans stayed at home to take on the winless Jacksonville Jaguars. Tennessee edged the Jags out 16-14, improving to 2-4 while the Jaguars dropped to 0-6.

==== Week 7: at Washington Redskins ====
Week Seven: Tennessee Titans at Washington Redskins – Game summary

Quarter	1	2	3	4	Total
Titans	3	7	0	7	**17**
**Redskins**	3	3	7	6	**19**

at FedExField, Landover, Maryland

- Date: October 19
- Game time: 1:00 p.m. EDT/12:00 p.m. CDT
- Game weather: 55 °F (13 °C), sunny
- Game attendance: 75,227
- Referee: Walt Anderson
- TV announcers (CBS): Kevin Harlan and Rich Gannon
- Recap, Gamebook

Game information

**First quarter**

**Second quarter**

**Third quarter**

**Fourth quarter**

**Top passers**

- TEN –
- WAS –

**Top rushers**

- TEN –
- WAS –

**Top receivers**

- TEN –
- WAS –

**Top tacklers**

- TEN –
- WAS –

Coming off their divisional home win over the Jaguars, the Titans traveled to FedEx field to take on the lowly Washington Redskins. The Redskins knocked off Tennessee, 19-17, dropping the Titans to 2-5 on the season.

==== Week 8: vs. Houston Texans ====
Week Eight: Houston Texans at Tennessee Titans – Game summary

Quarter	1	2	3	4	Total
**Texans**	0	13	14	3	**30**
Titans	3	0	6	7	**16**

at LP Field, Nashville, Tennessee

- Date: October 26
- Game time: 12:00 p.m. CDT
- Game weather: 79 °F (26 °C), (Sunny)
- Game attendance: 69,143
- Referee: Bill Leavy
- TV announcers (Fox): Kenny Albert, Daryl Johnston and Tony Siragusa
- Recap, Gamebook

Game information

**First quarter**

**Second quarter**

**Third quarter**

**Fourth quarter**

**Top passers**

- HOU –
- TEN –

**Top rushers**

- HOU –
- TEN –

**Top receivers**

- HOU –
- TEN –

**Top tacklers**

- HOU –
- TEN –

Hoping to rebound from their loss to the Redskins, the Titans stayed home to face the divisional rival Houston Texans. The Texans were on the rise and defeated the Titans, 30-16, dropping them to 2-6.

==== Week 10: at Baltimore Ravens ====
Week Ten: Tennessee Titans at Baltimore Ravens – Game summary

Quarter	1	2	3	4	Total
Titans	7	0	0	0	**7**
**Ravens**	0	7	7	7	**21**

at M&T Bank Stadium, Baltimore, Maryland

- Date: November 9
- Game time: 1:00 p.m. EST/12:00 p.m. CST
- Game weather: 57 °F (14 °C), partly cloudy
- Game attendance: 70,914
- Referee: Walt Coleman
- TV announcers (CBS): Andrew Catalon, Steve Beuerlein and Steve Tasker
- Recap, Gamebook

Game information

**First quarter**

**Second quarter**

**Third quarter**

**Fourth quarter**

**Top passers**

- TEN –
- BAL –

**Top rushers**

- TEN –
- BAL –

**Top receivers**

- TEN –
- BAL –

**Top tacklers**

- TEN –
- BAL –

Coming off their home loss to the Texans, the Titans traveled to Baltimore to face the Ravens. The Ravens scored three touchdowns en route to a 21-7 victory over the Titans, dropping them to a dismal 2-7.

==== Week 11: vs. Pittsburgh Steelers ====
Week Eleven: Pittsburgh Steelers at Tennessee Titans – Game summary

Quarter	1	2	3	4	Total
**Steelers**	13	0	0	14	**27**
Titans	7	10	7	0	**24**

at LP Field, Nashville, Tennessee

- Date: November 17
- Game time: 7:30 p.m. CST
- Game weather: 24 °F (−4 °C), (Clear)
- Game attendance: 69,143
- Referee: Brad Allen
- TV announcers (ESPN): Mike Tirico, Jon Gruden and Lisa Salters
- Recap, Gamebook

Game information

**First quarter**

**Second quarter**

**Third quarter**

**Fourth quarter**

**Top passers**

- PIT –
- TEN –

**Top rushers**

- PIT –
- TEN –

**Top receivers**

- PIT –
- TEN –

**Top tacklers**

- PIT –
- TEN –

Coming off their loss to the Ravens, the Titans stayed home for a Week 11 Monday Night Football clash with the rival Pittsburgh Steelers. The Steelers ended up winning the contest, 27-24, dropping the Titans to 2-8.

==== Week 12: at Philadelphia Eagles ====
Week Twelve: Tennessee Titans at Philadelphia Eagles – Game summary

Quarter	1	2	3	4	Total
Titans	0	17	0	7	**24**
**Eagles**	17	10	7	9	**43**

at Lincoln Financial Field, Philadelphia, Pennsylvania

- Date: November 23
- Game time: 1:00 p.m. EST/12:00 p.m. CST
- Game weather: 54 °F (12 °C), sunny
- Game attendance: 69,596
- Referee: Jerome Boger
- TV announcers (CBS): Greg Gumbel, Trent Green and Evan Washburn
- Recap, Gamebook

Game information

**First quarter**

**Second quarter**

**Third quarter**

**Fourth quarter**

**Top passers**

- TEN –
- PHI –

**Top rushers**

- TEN –
- PHI –

**Top receivers**

- TEN –
- PHI –

**Top tacklers**

- TEN –
- PHI –

The Eagles definitively beat the Titans, 43-24, dropping them to 2-9. With their fifth straight loss, the Titans secured a third straight non-winning season.

==== Week 13: at Houston Texans ====
Week Thirteen: Tennessee Titans at Houston Texans – Game summary

Quarter	1	2	3	4	Total
Titans	0	0	14	7	**21**
**Texans**	14	10	7	14	**45**

at NRG Stadium, Houston, Texas

- Date: November 30
- Game time: 12:00 p.m. CST
- Game weather: 76 °F (24 °C), partly cloudy (retractable roof open)
- Game attendance: 71,714
- Referee: Jeff Triplette
- TV announcers (CBS): Kevin Harlan and Rich Gannon
- Recap, Gamebook

Game information

**First quarter**

**Second quarter**

**Third quarter**

**Fourth quarter**

**Top passers**

- TEN –
- HOU –

**Top rushers**

- TEN –
- HOU –

**Top receivers**

- TEN –
- HOU –

**Top tacklers**

- TEN –
- HOU –

J.J. Watt dominated this game, as the Texans swept their rivals with a 45-21 victory. With the loss, the Titans were eliminated from playoff contention with a 2-10 record.

==== Week 14: vs. New York Giants ====
Week Fourteen: New York Giants at Tennessee Titans – Game summary

Quarter	1	2	3	4	Total
**Giants**	17	6	10	3	**36**
Titans	0	0	7	0	**7**

at LP Field, Nashville, Tennessee

- Date: December 7
- Game time: 12:00 p.m. CST
- Game weather: 46 °F (8 °C), (Cloudy)
- Game attendance: 69,143
- Referee: Walt Anderson
- TV announcers (Fox): Thom Brennaman, David Diehl and Laura Okmin
- Recap, Gamebook

Game information

**First quarter**

**Second quarter**

**Third quarter**

**Fourth quarter**

**Top passers**

- NYG –
- TEN –

**Top rushers**

- NYG –
- TEN –

**Top receivers**

- NYG –
- TEN –

**Top tacklers**

- NYG –
- TEN –

The Titans were the only AFC South team to lose to all of their NFC East opponents. With the loss, the Titans fell to 2–11.

==== Week 15: vs. New York Jets ====
Week Fifteen: New York Jets at Tennessee Titans – Game summary

Quarter	1	2	3	4	Total
**Jets**	0	3	7	6	**16**
Titans	3	2	6	0	**11**

at LP Field, Nashville, Tennessee

- Date: December 14
- Game time: 3:05 p.m. CST
- Game weather: 50 °F (10 °C), (Cloudy)
- Game attendance: 69,143
- Referee: John Parry
- TV announcers (CBS): Andrew Catalon, Steve Beuerlein and Steve Tasker
- Recap, Gamebook

Game information

**First quarter**

**Second quarter**

**Third quarter**

**Fourth quarter**

**Top passers**

- NYJ –
- TEN –

**Top rushers**

- NYJ –
- TEN –

**Top receivers**

- NYJ –
- TEN –

**Top tacklers**

- NYJ –
- TEN –

This was the first game in NFL history to end with a final score of 16–11. With the loss, the Titans fell to 2–12.

==== Week 16: at Jacksonville Jaguars ====
Week Sixteen: Tennessee Titans at Jacksonville Jaguars – Game summary

Quarter	1	2	3	4	Total
Titans	7	3	0	3	**13**
**Jaguars**	0	7	7	7	**21**

at EverBank Field, Jacksonville, Florida

- Date: December 18
- Game time: 8:25 p.m. EST/7:25 p.m. CST
- Game weather: 58 °F (14 °C), clear
- Game attendance: 61,202
- Referee: Clete Blakeman
- TV announcers (NFLN): Jim Nantz, Phil Simms and Tracy Wolfson
- Recap, Gamebook

Game information

**First quarter**

**Second quarter**

**Third quarter**

**Fourth quarter**

**Top passers**

- TEN –
- JAX –

**Top rushers**

- TEN –
- JAX –

**Top receivers**

- TEN –
- JAX –

**Top tacklers**

- TEN –
- JAX –

The Jaguars bested their divisional rivals by a score of 21–13, With the loss, the Titans fell to 2–13.

==== Week 17: vs. Indianapolis Colts ====
Week Seventeen: Indianapolis Colts at Tennessee Titans – Game summary

Quarter	1	2	3	4	Total
**Colts**	7	10	0	10	**27**
Titans	0	7	3	0	**10**

at LP Field, Nashville, Tennessee

- Date: December 28
- Game time: 12:00 p.m. CST
- Game weather: 40 °F (4 °C), (Light Rain)
- Game attendance: 69,143
- Referee: Tony Corrente
- TV announcers (CBS): Tom McCarthy and Adam Archuleta
- Recap, Gamebook

Game information

**First quarter** **Second quarter** **Third quarter** **Fourth quarter**

**Top passers**

- IND –
- TEN –

**Top rushers**

- IND –
- TEN –

**Top receivers**

- IND –
- TEN –

**Top tacklers**

- IND –
- TEN –

With the loss and the Saints win over the Buccaneers, Titans ended up at 2–14, tying with the Buccaneers. Titans earned the second pick in the 2015 NFL Draft.

== Standings ==
=== Division ===
AFC South
	W	L	T	PCT	DIV	CONF	PF	PA	STK
^{(4)} Indianapolis Colts	11	5	0	.688	6–0	9–3	458	369	W1
Houston Texans	9	7	0	.563	4–2	8–4	372	307	W2
Jacksonville Jaguars	3	13	0	.188	1–5	2–10	249	412	L1
Tennessee Titans	2	14	0	.125	1–5	2–10	254	438	L10

=== Conference ===
AFC
#	Team	Division	W	L	T	PCT	DIV	CONF	SOS	SOV	STK
Division leaders
1 (Note: New England defeated Denver head-to-head (Week 9, 43–21).)	New England Patriots	East	12	4	0	.750	4–2	9–3	.514	.487	L1
2	Denver Broncos	West	12	4	0	.750	6–0	10–2	.521	.484	W1
3 (Note: Pittsburgh defeated Indianapolis head-to-head (Week 8, 51–34).)	Pittsburgh Steelers	North	11	5	0	.688	4–2	9–3	.451	.486	W4
4	Indianapolis Colts	South	11	5	0	.688	6–0	9–3	.479	.372	W1
Wild Cards
5	Cincinnati Bengals	North	10	5	1	.656	3–3	7–5	.498	.425	L1
6	Baltimore Ravens	North	10	6	0	.625	3–3	6–6	.475	.378	W1
Did not qualify for the postseason
7 (Note: Kansas City finished ahead of San Diego in the AFC West based on head-to-head sweep (Week 7, 23–20; Week 17, 19–7). Houston finished ahead of Kansas City and Buffalo based on conference record. Kansas City finished ahead of Buffalo based on head-to-head victory (Week 10, 17–13). San Diego finished ahead of Buffalo based on head-to-head victory (Week 3, 22–10).)	Houston Texans	South	9	7	0	.563	4–2	8–4	.447	.299	W2
8	Kansas City Chiefs	West	9	7	0	.563	3–3	7–5	.512	.500	W1
9	San Diego Chargers	West	9	7	0	.563	2–4	6–6	.512	.403	L1
10	Buffalo Bills	East	9	7	0	.563	4–2	5–7	.516	.486	W1
11	Miami Dolphins	East	8	8	0	.500	3–3	6–6	.512	.406	L1
12	Cleveland Browns	North	7	9	0	.438	2–4	4–8	.479	.371	L5
13	New York Jets	East	4	12	0	.250	1–5	4–8	.543	.375	W1
14 (Note: Jacksonville finished ahead of Oakland based on record vs. common opponents (1–4 to 0–5).)	Jacksonville Jaguars	South	3	13	0	.188	1–5	2–10	.514	.313	L1
15	Oakland Raiders	West	3	13	0	.188	1–5	2–10	.570	.542	L1
16	Tennessee Titans	South	2	14	0	.125	1–5	2–10	.506	.375	L10
Tiebreakers (Note: When breaking ties for three or more teams under the NFL's rules, they are first broken within divisions, then comparing only the highest ranked remaining team from each division.)
