= 2015 Tennessee Titans season =

56th season in franchise history

- Owner: KSA Industries
- General manager: Ruston Webster
- Head coach: Ken Whisenhunt (fired on November 3; 1–6 record); Mike Mularkey (interim; 2–7 record)
- Home stadium: Nissan Stadium

Results
- Record: 3–13
- Division place: 4th AFC South
- Playoffs: Did not qualify
- Pro Bowlers: TE Delanie Walker; DT Jurrell Casey

Uniform
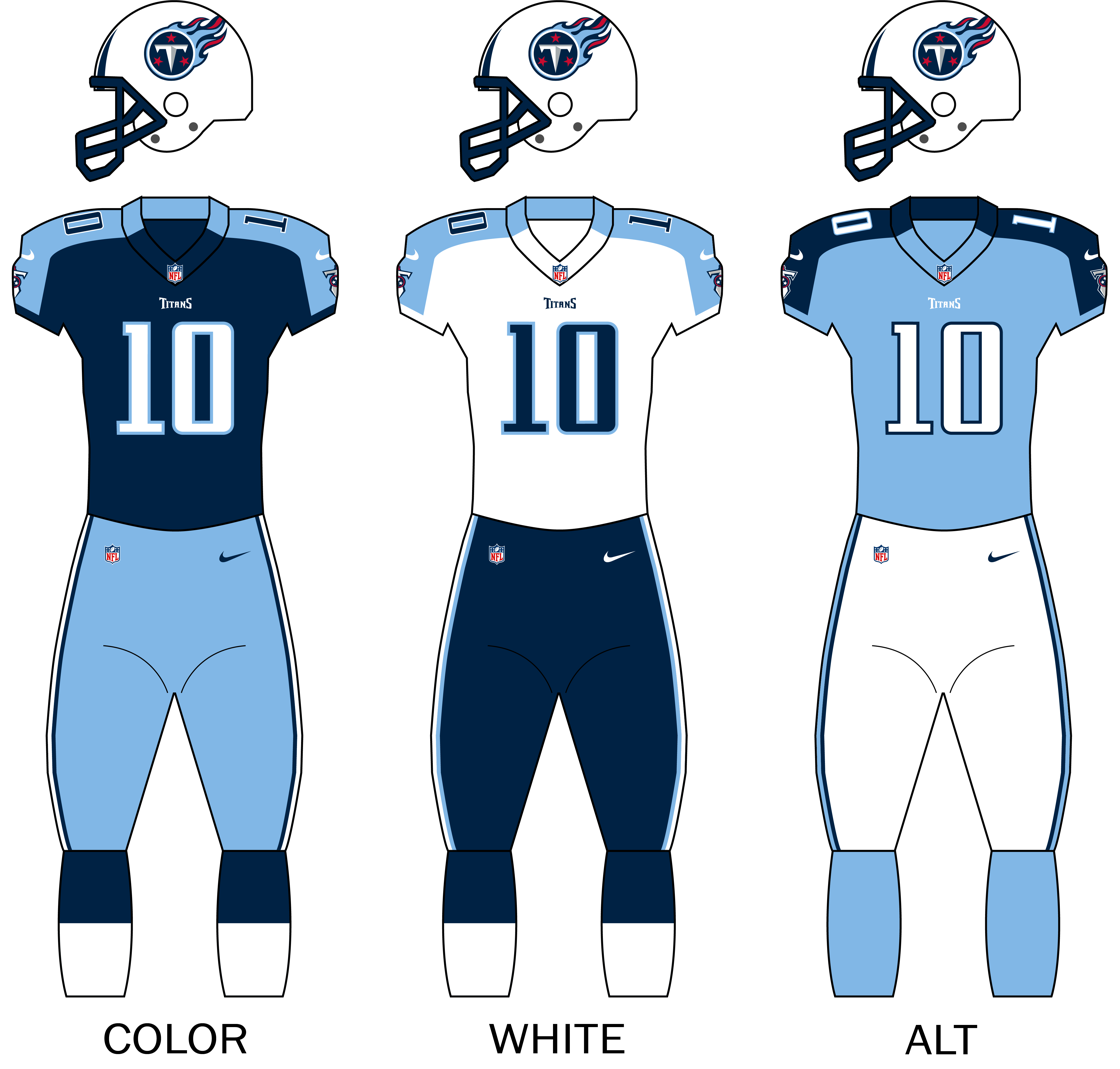

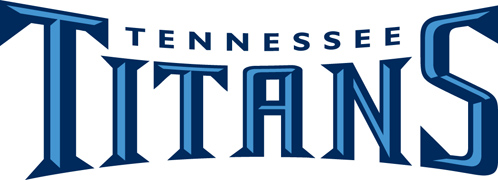
Tennessee Titans Alternate Logo, 1999-2017

The 2015 season was the Tennessee Titans' 46th in the National Football League (NFL), their 56th overall and their 19th in the state of Tennessee. Second-year head coach Ken Whisenhunt was fired on November 3 following a 1–6 start, and was replaced by tight ends coach Mike Mularkey on an interim basis. Despite slightly improving from their 2–14 season from the previous year, finishing with a 3–13 record (tied with the Cleveland Browns), they finished with a lower Strength of Schedule, thus earning the right to the top pick in the 2016 NFL draft, later trading it to the Los Angeles Rams.

Until 2022, this was the last time the Titans had a losing season.

== Uniform change ==
The Titans switched their primary colored jerseys from light "Titans Blue" to navy blue, the latter of which was the team's primary home jersey color from 1999–2007.

== 2015 draft class ==
2015 Tennessee Titans Draft
Round	Selection	Player	Position	College
1	2	Marcus Mariota	QB	Oregon
2	40	Dorial Green-Beckham	WR	Missouri
3	66	Jeremiah Poutasi	OT	Utah
4	100	Angelo Blackson	DT	Auburn
4	108	Jalston Fowler	FB	Alabama
5	138	David Cobb	RB	Minnesota
6	177	Deiontrez Mount	LB	Louisville
6	208	Andy Gallik	C	Boston College
7	245	Tre McBride	WR	William & Mary

Notes

- The Titans acquired an additional sixth-round selection (No. 208 overall) in a trade that sent the team's seventh-round selection (No. 219 overall) and linebacker Akeem Ayers to the New England Patriots.
- The Titans traded their second-round selection (No. 33 overall) to the New York Giants for the Giants' No. 40, No. 108, and No. 245 overall draft picks.

== Staff ==
2015 Tennessee Titans staff
Front office: Owner – KSA Industries; President, chairman and CEO – Steve Underwood; Executive vice president and general manager – Ruston Webster; Assistant director of football administration – Dennis Polian; Vice president of football administration – Vin Marino; Director of college scouting – Blake Beddingfield; Director of pro scouting – Brian Gardner; Head coaches: Head coach – Ken Whisenhunt (fired November 3, 2015); Interim head coach – Mike Mularkey; Assistant head coach/defense – Dick LeBeau; Offensive coaches: Offensive coordinator – Jason Michael; Quarterbacks – John McNulty; Running backs – Sylvester Croom; Wide receivers – Shawn Jefferson; Assistant wide receivers – Jason Tucker; Tight ends – Mike Mularkey; Assistant tight ends/offensive line – Arthur Smith; Offensive line – Bob Bostad; Assistant offensive line – Mike Sullivan; Offensive assistant – Luke Steckel	Defensive coaches: Defensive coordinator – Ray Horton; Defensive line – Giff Smith; Assistant defensive line – Nick Eason; Linebackers – Lou Spanos; Defensive Backs − Louie Cioffi; Assistant secondary – Steve Brown; Defensive quality control – Cannon Matthews; Special teams coaches: Special teams – Nate Kaczor; Assistant special teams – Steve Hoffman

== Final roster ==
2015 Tennessee Titans roster
Quarterbacks (QB): 8 Marcus Mariota; 7 Zach Mettenberger; 11 Alex Tanney; Running backs (RB): 26 Antonio Andrews; 23 David Cobb; 45 Jalston Fowler FB; 20 Bishop Sankey; Wide receivers (WR): 83 Harry Douglas; 17 Dorial Green-Beckham; 16 Tre McBride; 86 Andrew Turzilli; 13 Kendall Wright; 11 Damaris Johnson; Tight ends (TE): 80 Anthony Fasano; 88 Craig Stevens; 89 Phillip Supernaw; 82 Delanie Walker	Offensive linemen (OL): 76 Byron Bell T/G; 69 Andy Gallik C; 77 Taylor Lewan T; 78 Joe Looney C/G; 79 Jamon Meredith G/T; 73 Jeremiah Poutasi T; 60 Quinton Spain G; 70 Chance Warmack G; Defensive linemen (DL): 95 Angelo Blackson DE; 99 Jurrell Casey DE; 94 Sammie Lee Hill NT; 90 DaQuan Jones DE; 97 Karl Klug DE; 92 Ropati Pitoitua DE; 96 Al Woods NT	Linebackers (LB): 51 David Bass OLB; 55 Zach Brown ILB; 52 Steven Johnson ILB; 98 Brian Orakpo OLB; 57 Justin Staples OLB; 41 J. R. Tavai OLB; 54 Avery Williamson ILB; 59 Wesley Woodyard ILB; Defensive backs (DB): 31 Josh Aubrey SS; 29 Perrish Cox CB; 33 Michael Griffin FS; 28 Marqueston Huff FS; 37 Cody Riggs CB; 21 Da'Norris Searcy SS; 24 Coty Sensabaugh CB; 39 Daimion Stafford S; 38 B. W. Webb CB; 25 Blidi Wreh-Wilson CB; Special teams (ST): 48 Beau Brinkley LS; 6 Brett Kern P; 4 Ryan Succop K	Practice squad: 56 Jason Ankrah OLB; 61 Dillon Farrell C; 32 David Fluellen RB; 85 Kevin Greene TE; 18 Nick Harwell WR; 19 Gavin Lutman WR; 66 Josue Matías G; 75 Will Poehls T; 5 Bryn Renner QB; 36 Shaquille Richardson CB; Reserve: 40 Yannik Cudjoe-Virgil OLB (IR); 42 Dorin Dickerson TE (IR); -- Brandon Harris CB (IR); 15 Justin Hunter WR (IR); 93 Mike Martin DE (IR); 22 Dexter McCluster RB (IR); 30 Jason McCourty CB (IR); 91 Derrick Morgan OLB (IR); 53 Deiontrez Mount OLB (IR); 46 Curtis Riley CB (IR); 62 Brian Schwenke C (IR); Rookies in italics 53 active, 11 reserve, 10 practice squad

=== Team captains ===
- Taylor Lewan (OT)
- Delanie Walker (TE)
- Jurrell Casey (DE)
- Brian Orakpo (LB)
- Wesley Woodyard (LB)
- Jason McCourty (CB)

== Schedule ==
=== Preseason ===
Week	Date	Opponent	Result	Record	Venue	Recap
1	August 14	at Atlanta Falcons	**L** 24–31	0–1	Georgia Dome	Recap
2	August 23	St. Louis Rams	**W** 27–14	1–1	Nissan Stadium	Recap
3	August 28	at Kansas City Chiefs	**L** 10–34	1–2	Arrowhead Stadium	Recap
4	September 3	Minnesota Vikings	**W** 24–17	2–2	Nissan Stadium	Recap

=== Regular season ===
Week	Date	Opponent	Result	Record	Venue	Recap
1	September 13	at Tampa Bay Buccaneers	**W** 42–14	1–0	Raymond James Stadium	Recap
2	September 20	at Cleveland Browns	**L** 14–28	1–1	FirstEnergy Stadium	Recap
3	September 27	**Indianapolis Colts**	**L** 33–35	1–2	Nissan Stadium	Recap
4	Bye					
5	October 11	Buffalo Bills	**L** 13–14	1–3	Nissan Stadium	Recap
6	October 18	Miami Dolphins	**L** 10–38	1–4	Nissan Stadium	Recap
7	October 25	Atlanta Falcons	**L** 7–10	1–5	Nissan Stadium	Recap
8	November 1	at **Houston Texans**	**L** 6–20	1–6	NRG Stadium	Recap
9	November 8	at New Orleans Saints	**W** 34–28 (OT)	2–6	Mercedes-Benz Superdome	Recap
10	November 15	Carolina Panthers	**L** 10–27	2–7	Nissan Stadium	Recap
11	November 19	at **Jacksonville Jaguars**	**L** 13–19	2–8	EverBank Field	Recap
12	November 29	Oakland Raiders	**L** 21–24	2–9	Nissan Stadium	Recap
13	December 6	**Jacksonville Jaguars**	**W** 42–39	3–9	Nissan Stadium	Recap
14	December 13	at New York Jets	**L** 8–30	3–10	MetLife Stadium	Recap
15	December 20	at New England Patriots	**L** 16–33	3–11	Gillette Stadium	Recap
16	December 27	**Houston Texans**	**L** 6–34	3–12	Nissan Stadium	Recap
17	January 3	at **Indianapolis Colts**	**L** 24–30	3–13	Lucas Oil Stadium	Recap

Note: Intra-division opponents are in bold text.

=== Game summaries ===
==== Week 1: at Tampa Bay Buccaneers ====
Week One: Tennessee Titans at Tampa Bay Buccaneers – Game summary

Quarter	1	2	3	4	Total
**Titans**	21	14	7	0	**42**
Buccaneers	0	7	0	7	**14**

at Raymond James Stadium, Tampa, Florida

- Date: September 13
- Game time: 4:25 p.m. EDT/3:25 p.m. CDT
- Game weather: 84 °F (29 °C), cloudy
- Game attendance: 63,945
- Referee: John Hussey
- TV announcers (CBS): Andrew Catalon, Steve Beuerlein, Steve Tasker and Chris Fischer
- Recap, Gamebook

Game information

**First quarter**

- TEN - Kendall Wright 52 yd. pass from Marcus Mariota (Ryan Succop kick) (4-89, 1:50), 13:10. **Titans 7-0**.
- TEN - Coty Sensabaugh 26 yd. interception return (Ryan Succop kick), 11:48. **Titans 14-0**.
- TEN - Bishop Sankey 12 yd. pass from Marcus Mariota (Ryan Succop kick) (6-63, 3:27), 6:49. **Titans 21-0**.

**Second quarter**

- TB - Austin Seferian-Jenkins 5 yd. pass from Jameis Winston (Kyle Brindza kick) (12-68, 6:55), 14:54. **Titans 21-7**.
- TEN - Harry Douglas 4 yd. pass from Marcus Mariota (Ryan Succop kick) (9-56, 6:02), 3:47. **Titans 28-7**.
- TEN - Delanie Walker 1 yd. pass from Marcus Mariota (Ryan Succop kick) (6-32, 1:49), 0:48. **Titans 35-7**.

**Third quarter**

- TEN - Bishop Sankey 1 yd. run (Ryan Succop kick) (6-54, 4:21), 8:02. **Titans 42-7**.

**Fourth quarter**

- TB - Austin Seferian-Jenkins 41 yd. pass from Jameis Winston (Kyle Brindza kick) (8-72, 3:18), 9:18. **Titans 42-14**.

**Top passers**

- TEN – Marcus Mariota - 13/16, 209 yards, 4 TD
- TB – Jameis Winston - 16/33, 210 yards, 2 INT

**Top rushers**

- TEN – Bishop Sankey - 12 rushes, 74 yards, TD
- TB – Doug Martin - 11 rushes, 52 yards

**Top receivers**

- TEN – Kendall Wright - 4 rec, 101 yards, TD
- TB – Austin Seferian-Jenkins - 5 rec, 110 yards, 2 TD

**Top tacklers**

- TEN – DaQuan Jones - 7 tackles
- TB – Chris Conte - 5 tackles

This was Jameis Winston's first game in the NFL. His first pass attempt was intercepted and returned all the way for a touchdown by Coty Sensabaugh. On the other hand, Marcus Mariota threw 4 touchdowns in his NFL debut. The Titans commanded this game from start to finish and never trailed. With the win, the Titans began their season 1-0 snapping a 10 game losing streak dating back to last season.

==== Week 2: at Cleveland Browns ====
Week Two: Tennessee Titans at Cleveland Browns – Game summary

Quarter	1	2	3	4	Total
Titans	0	0	7	7	**14**
**Browns**	14	7	0	7	**28**

at FirstEnergy Stadium, Cleveland, Ohio

- Date: September 20
- Game time: 1:00 p.m. EDT/12:00 p.m. CDT
- Game weather: 64 °F (18 °C), sunny
- Game attendance: 67,431
- Referee: Terry McAulay
- TV announcers (CBS): Tom McCarthy and Adam Archuleta
- Preview, Gamebook

Game information

**First quarter**

- CLE – Travis Benjamin 60 yd. pass from Johnny Manziel (Travis Coons kick) (2-62, 0:40), 12:51. **Browns 7-0**.
- CLE – Isaiah Crowell 11 yd. run (Travis Coons kick) (7-50, 4:02), 6:26. **Browns 14-0**.

**Second quarter**

- CLE – Travis Benjamin 78 yd. punt return (Travis Coons kick), 0:53. **Browns 21-0**.

**Third quarter**

- TEN – Anthony Fasano 19 yd. pass from Marcus Mariota (Ryan Succop kick) (8-67, 4:09), 1:36. **Browns 21-7**.

**Fourth quarter**

- TEN – Dorial Green-Beckham 13 yd. pass from Marcus Mariota (Ryan Succop kick) (15-77, 8:07), 6:42. **Browns 21-14**.
- CLE – Travis Benjamin 50 yd. pass from Johnny Manziel (Travis Coons kick) (7-80, 3:50), 2:52. **Browns 28-14**.

**Top passers**

- TEN – Marcus Mariota, 21-37, 257 yards, 2 TD
- CLE – Johnny Manziel, 8-15, 172 yards, 2 TD

**Top rushers**

- TEN – Dexter McCluster, 10 rushes, 98 yards
- CLE – Isaiah Crowell, 15 rushes, 72 yards, TD

**Top receivers**

- TEN – Anthony Fasano, 5 catches, 84 yards, TD
- CLE – Travis Benjamin, 3 catches, 115 yards, 2 TD

**Top tacklers**

- TEN – Zach Brown, Derrick Morgan - 5 tackles
- CLE – Karlos Dansby. Tashaun Gipson - 5 tackles

With the loss, the Titans fell to 1-1.

==== Week 3: vs. Indianapolis Colts ====
Week Three: Indianapolis Colts at Tennessee Titans – Game summary

Quarter	1	2	3	4	Total
**Colts**	7	7	0	21	**35**
Titans	0	10	17	6	**33**

at Nissan Stadium, Nashville, Tennessee

- Date: September 27
- Game time: 12:00 p.m. CDT
- Game weather: 77 °F (25 °C), (Cloudy)
- Game attendance: 65,920
- Referee: Craig Wrolstad
- TV announcers (CBS): Tom McCarthy and Adam Archuleta
- Recap, Gamebook

Game information

**First quarter**

- IND – Frank Gore 1 yd. run (Adam Vinatieri kick) (8-63, 3:43), 5:42. **Colts 7-0**.

**Second quarter**

- IND – Dwight Lowery 69 yd. interception return (Adam Vinatieri kick), 12:59. **Colts 14-0**.
- TEN – Ryan Succop 38 yd. Field Goal (9-60, 4:30), 8:29. **Colts 10-3**.
- TEN – Kendall Wright 7 yd. pass from Marcus Mariota (Ryan Succop kick) (13-83, 6:05), 0:19. **Colts 14-10**.

**Third quarter**

- TEN – Antonio Andrews 8 yd. run (Ryan Succop kick) (6-66, 3:42), 9:51. **Titans 17-14**.
- TEN – Dorial Green-Beckham 3 yd. pass from Marcus Mariota (R.Succop kick) (1-3, 0:05), 9:36. **Titans 24-14**.
- TEN – Ryan Succop 21 yd. Field Goal (8-10, 3:41), 3:04. **Titans 27-14**.

**Fourth quarter**

- IND – Phillip Dorsett 35 yd. pass from Andrew Luck (Adam Vinatieri kick) (12-98, 5:31), 6:49. **Titans 27-21**.
- IND – Donte Moncrief 11 yd. pass from Andrew Luck (Adam Vinatieri kick) (1-11, 0:06), 5:53. **Colts 28-27**.
- IND – Frank Gore 6 yd. run (Adam Vinatieri kick) (5-69, 2:38), 2:51. **Colts 35-27**.
- TEN – Jalston Fowler 1 yd. run (run failed) (9-80, 2:04), 0:47. **Colts 35-33**.

**Top passers**

- IND – Andrew Luck, 18-30, 260 yards, 2 TD, 2 INT
- TEN – Marcus Mariota, 27-44, 367 yards, 2 TD, 2 INT

**Top rushers**

- IND – Frank Gore, 14 rushes, 86 yards, 2 TD
- TEN – Antonio Andrews, 12 rushes, 49 yards, TD

**Top receivers**

- IND – Donte Moncrief - 4 catches, 32 yards, TD, T. Y. Hilton - 4 catches, 94 yards
- TEN – Kendall Wright - 7 catches, 95 yards, TD

**Top tacklers**

- IND – D'Qwell Jackson - 8 tackles
- TEN – Avery Williamson - 4 tackles

The Titans led 27-14 in the third quarter after trailing 14-0 in the first half. In the fourth quarter, it was all Colts as they outscored the Titans 21-6 in the fourth quarter. The Titans had a chance to tie the game and force overtime late in the fourth quarter, but the 2-point conversion failed, and the Titans lost their 8th straight game against the Colts. With the loss, the Titans fell to 1-2.

==== Week 5: vs. Buffalo Bills ====
Week Five: Buffalo Bills at Tennessee Titans – Game summary

Quarter	1	2	3	4	Total
**Bills**	0	0	7	7	**14**
Titans	0	3	7	3	**13**

at Nissan Stadium, Nashville, Tennessee

- Date: October 11
- Game time: 12:00 p.m. CDT
- Game weather: 72 °F (22 °C), (Partly Cloudy)
- Game attendance: 65,670
- Referee: Walt Anderson
- TV announcers (CBS): Andrew Catalon, Steve Beuerlein and Steve Tasker
- Recap, Gamebook

Game information

**Second quarter**

- TEN – Ryan Succop 21 yd. Field Goal (13-62, 7:39), 14:09. **Titans 3-0**.

**Third quarter**

- TEN – Antonio Andrews 1 yd. run (Ryan Succop kick) (7-39, 4:15), 6:51. **Titans 10-0**.
- BUF – Tyrod Taylor 22 yd. run (Dan Carpenter kick) (9-80, 5:31), 1:20. **Titans 10-7**.

**Fourth quarter**

- TEN – Ryan Succop 41 yd. Field Goal (13-72, 6:44), 9:36. **Titans 13-7**.
- BUF – Chris Hogan 2 yd. pass from Tyrod Taylor (Dan Carpenter kick) (8-80, 4:11), 5:25. **Dolphins 14-13**.

**Top passers**

- BUF – Tyrod Taylor, 10-17, 109 yards, TD
- TEN – Marcus Mariota, 21-32, 187 yards, INT

**Top rushers**

- BUF – Tyrod Taylor, 8 rushes, 76 yards, TD
- TEN – Marcus Mariota, 5 rushes, 47 yards

**Top receivers**

- BUF – Chris Hogan, 3 catches, 52 yards, TD
- TEN – Justin Hunter - 4 catches, 38 yards, Delanie Walker - 4 catches, 36 yards

**Top tacklers**

- BUF – Corey Graham - 8 tackles
- TEN – Avery Williamson - 7 tackles

With the loss, the Titans fell to 1-3.

==== Week 6: vs. Miami Dolphins ====
Week Six: Miami Dolphins at Tennessee Titans – Game summary

Quarter	1	2	3	4	Total
**Dolphins**	10	7	7	14	**38**
Titans	3	0	7	0	**10**

at Nissan Stadium, Nashville, Tennessee

- Date: October 18
- Game time: 12:00 p.m. CDT
- Game weather: 62 °F (17 °C), (Sunny)
- Game attendance: 62,342
- Referee: Jeff Triplette
- TV announcers (CBS): Andrew Catalon, Steve Beuerlein and Steve Tasker
- Recap, Gamebook

Game information

**First quarter**

- MIA – Jarvis Landry 22 yd. run (Andrew Franks kick) (7-80, 4:21), 10:39. **Dolphins 7-0**.
- TEN – Ryan Succop 37 yd. Field Goal (10-61, 5:11), 5:28. **Dolphins 7-3**.
- MIA – Andrew Franks 30 yd. Field Goal (10-68, 5:22), 0:06. **Dolphins 10-3**.

**Second quarter**

- MIA – Lamar Miller 7 yd. run (Andrew Franks kick) (7-34, 3:39), 5:07. **Dolphins 17-3**.

**Third quarter**

- MIA – Reshad Jones 30 yd. interception return (Andrew Franks kick), 5:40. **Dolphins 24-3**.
- TEN – Dexter McCluster 3 yd. pass from Marcus Mariota (Ryan Succop kick) (5-52, 2:15), 0:00. **Dolphins 24-10**.

**Fourth quarter**

- MIA – Dion Sims 2 yd. pass from Ryan Tannehill (Andrew Franks kick) (9-97, 5:30), 7:38. **Dolphins 31-10**.
- MIA – Jordan Cameron 12 yd. pass from Ryan Tannehill (Andrew Franks kick) (7-47, 4:05), 1:54. **Dolphins 38-10**.

**Top passers**

- MIA – Ryan Tannehill, 22-29, 266 yards, 2 TD, 2 INT
- TEN – Marcus Mariota, 21-33, 219 yards, TD, 2 INT

**Top rushers**

- MIA – Lamar Miller, 19 rushes, 113 yards, TD
- TEN – Antonio Andrews, 9 rushes, 23 yards

**Top receivers**

- MIA – Rishard Matthews, 6 catches, 85 yards
- TEN – Delanie Walker, 8 catches, 97 yards

**Top tacklers**

- MIA – Koa Misi - 6 tackles
- TEN – Zach Brown, Wesley Woodyard, Da'Norris Searcy - 8 tackles

With the loss, the Titans fell to 1-4.

==== Week 7: vs. Atlanta Falcons ====
Week Seven: Atlanta Falcons at Tennessee Titans – Game summary

Quarter	1	2	3	4	Total
**Falcons**	0	3	7	0	**10**
Titans	0	7	0	0	**7**

at Nissan Stadium, Nashville, Tennessee

- Date: October 25
- Game time: 12:00 p.m. CDT
- Game weather: 62 °F (17 °C), (Light Rain)
- Game attendance: 63,329
- Referee: Brad Allen
- TV announcers (Fox): Thom Brennaman, Charles Davis and Tony Siragusa
- Recap, Gamebook

Game information

**Second quarter**

- TEN – Kendall Wright 19 yd. pass from Zach Mettenberger (Ryan Succop kick) (1-19, 0:07), 8:42. **Titans 7-0**.
- ATL – Matt Bryant 27 yd. Field Goal (11-55, 6:11), 2:31. **Titans 7-3**.

**Third quarter**

- ATL – Julio Jones 8 yd. pass from Matt Ryan (Matt Bryant kick) (9-88, 4:30), 5:56. **Falcons 10-7**.

**Top passers**

- ATL – Matt Ryan, 22-38, 251 yards, TD, 2 INT
- TEN – Zach Mettenberger, 22-35, 187 yards, TD, 2 INT

**Top rushers**

- ATL – Devonta Freeman, 25 rushes, 116 yards
- TEN – Antonio Andrews, 10 rushes, 57 yards

**Top receivers**

- ATL – Julio Jones, 9 catches, 92 yards, TD
- TEN – Delanie Walker, 7 catches, 55 yards

**Top tacklers**

- ATL – Justin Durant, Ricardo Allen, Kemal Ishmael - 6 tackles
- TEN – Wesley Woodyard - 6 tackles

In the low-scoring loss, the Titans fell to 1-5.

==== Week 8: at Houston Texans ====
Week Eight: Tennessee Titans at Houston Texans – Game summary

Quarter	1	2	3	4	Total
Titans	3	0	3	0	**6**
**Texans**	0	10	7	3	**20**

at Reliant Stadium, Houston, Texas

- Date: November 1
- Game time: 12:00 p.m. CST
- Game weather: Played indoors (retractable roof closed)
- Game attendance: 71,630
- Referee: Clete Blakeman
- TV announcers (CBS): Spero Dedes and Solomon Wilcots
- Recap, Gamebook

Game information

**First quarter**

- TEN – Ryan Succop 35 yd. Field Goal (10-59, 4:46), 9:05. **Titans 3-0**.

**Second quarter**

- HOU – DeAndre Hopkins 21 yd. pass from Brian Hoyer (Nick Novak kick) (5-54, 1:28), 14:04. **Texans 7-3**.
- HOU – Nick Novak 38 yd. Field Goal (4-4, 2:21), 11:34. **Texans 10-3**.

**Third quarter**

- TEN – Ryan Succop 44 yd. Field Goal (6-44, 3:09), 5:54. **Texans 10-6**.
- HOU – Nate Washington 42 yd. pass from Brian Hoyer (Nick Novak kick) (6-80, 2:16), 3:38. **Texans 17-6**.

**Fourth quarter**

- HOU – Nick Novak 24 yd. Field Goal (4-4, 1:16), 12:33. **Texans 20-6**.

**Top passers**

- TEN – Zach Mettenberger, 22-31, 171 yards, INT
- HOU – Brian Hoyer, 23-35, 234 yards, 2 TD

**Top rushers**

- TEN – Antonio Andrews, 16 rushes, 64 yards
- HOU – Alfred Blue, 14 rushes, 39 yards

**Top receivers**

- TEN – Delanie Walker, 6 catches, 62 yards
- HOU – DeAndre Hopkins, 8 catches, 94 yards, TD

**Top tacklers**

- TEN – Wesley Woodyard - 7 tackles
- HOU – Brian Cushing, Whitney Mercilus - 6 tackles

With the loss, Tennessee fell to 1-6. This was also Ken Whisenhunt's last game coaching the Titans, as he was fired a couple of days later.

==== Week 9: at New Orleans Saints ====
Week Nine: Tennessee Titans at New Orleans Saints – Game summary

Quarter	1	2	3	4	OT	Total
**Titans**	10	7	3	8	6	**34**
Saints	14	7	0	7	0	**28**

at Mercedes-Benz Superdome, New Orleans, Louisiana

- Date: November 8
- Game time: 12:00 p.m. CST
- Game weather: Played indoors (dome stadium)
- Game attendance: 73,075
- Referee: Jerome Boger
- TV announcers (CBS): Kevin Harlan and Rich Gannon
- Recap, Gamebook

Game information

**First quarter**

- NO – Josh Hill 10 yd. pass from Drew Brees (Kai Forbath kick) (7-72, 3:50), 9:46. **Saints 7-0**.
- TEN – Ryan Succop 51 yd. Field Goal (4-9, 1:43), 6:58. **Saints 7-3**.
- NO – Brandin Cooks 38 yd. pass from Drew Brees (Kai Forbath kick) (8-80, 3:14), 3:44. **Saints 14-3**.
- TEN – Delanie Walker 61 yd. pass from Marcus Mariota (Ryan Succop kick) (4-75, 2:44), 1:00. **Saints 14-10**.

**Second quarter**

- NO – Drew Brees 1 yd. run (Kai Forbath kick) (10-79, 4:59), 11:01. **Saints 21-10**.
- TEN – Delanie Walker 2 yd. pass from Marcus Mariota (Ryan Succop kick) (5-77, 2:53), 8:08. **Saints 21-17**.

**Third quarter**

- TEN – Ryan Succop 29 yd. Field Goal (11-56, 5:39), 7:17. **Saints 21-20**.

**Fourth quarter**

- NO – Michael Hoomanawanui 1 yd. pass from Drew Brees (Kai Forbath kick) (13-62, 5:57), 11:32. **Saints 28-20**.
- TEN – Justin Hunter 8 yd. pass from Marcus Mariota (Marcus Mariota-Delanie Walker pass) (8-57, 4:26), 7:06. **Tied 28-28**.

**Overtime**

- TEN – Anthony Fasano 5 yd. pass from Marcus Mariota (9-80, 5:10), 9:50. **Titans 34-28**.

**Top passers**

- TEN – Marcus Mariota, 28-39, 371 yards, 4 TD
- NO – Drew Brees, 28-39, 389 yards, 3 TD, INT

**Top rushers**

- TEN – Antonio Andrews, 19 rushes, 88 yards
- NO – Mark Ingram II, 21 rushes, 52 yards

**Top receivers**

- TEN – Delanie Walker, 7 catches, 95 yards, 2 TD
- NO – Willie Snead, 6 catches, 95 yards

**Top tacklers**

- TEN – Wesley Woodyard, Michael Griffin - 8 tackles
- NO – Jairus Byrd, Michael Mauti, Kenny Vaccaro, John Jenkins - 10 tackles

Both teams missed potential game-winning field goals towards the end of regulation. In overtime, Marcus Mariota led the Titans down the field and threw the game-winning touchdown to Anthony Fasano to end the game. With the win, the Titans improved to 2-6, earning their first win under Mike Mularkey.

==== Week 10: vs. Carolina Panthers ====
Week Ten: Carolina Panthers at Tennessee Titans – Game summary

Quarter	1	2	3	4	Total
**Panthers**	7	7	3	10	**27**
Titans	7	3	0	0	**10**

at Nissan Stadium, Nashville, Tennessee

- Date: November 15
- Game time: 12:00 p.m. CST
- Game weather: 63 °F (17 °C), (Cloudy)
- Game attendance: 63,591
- Referee: Walt Anderson
- TV announcers (Fox): Thom Brennaman, Charles Davis and Tony Siragusa
- Recap, Gamebook

Game information

**First quarter**

- CAR – Jonathan Stewart 16 yd. run (Graham Gano kick) (8-63, 5:15), 8:36. **Panthers 7-0**.
- TEN – Dexter McCluster 25 yd. run (Ryan Succop kick) (10-82, 4:58), 3:38. **Tied 7-7**.

**Second quarter**

- CAR – Ed Dickson 1 yd. pass from Cam Newton (Graham Gano kick) (9-80, 5:24), 13:14. **Panthers 14-7**.
- TEN – Ryan Succop 45 yd. Field Goal (9-54, 5:29), 7:45. **Panthers 14-10**.

**Third quarter**

- CAR – Graham Gano 48 yd. Field Goal (8-29, 3:38), 0:23. **Panthers 17-10**.

**Fourth quarter**

- CAR – Graham Gano 19 yd. Field Goal (8-42, 4:16), 9:06. **Panthers 20-10**.
- CAR – Cam Newton 2 yd. run (Graham Gano kick) (10-64, 4:44), 2:42. **Panthers 27-10**.

**Top passers**

- CAR – Cam Newton, 21-26, 217 yards, TD
- TEN – Marcus Mariota, 16-24, 185 yards, INT

**Top rushers**

- CAR – Jonathan Stewart, 22 rushes, 91 yards, TD
- TEN – Dexter McCluster, 3 rushes, 25 yards, TD

**Top receivers**

- CAR – Greg Olsen, 8 catches, 80 yards
- TEN – Justin Hunter, 4 catches, 47 yards

**Top tacklers**

- CAR – Luke Kuechly – 6 tackles
- TEN – Avery Williamson – 7 tackles

With the loss, the Titans fell to 2-7 and they finished 2-2 against the NFC South.

==== Week 11: at Jacksonville Jaguars ====
Week Eleven: Tennessee Titans at Jacksonville Jaguars – Game summary

Quarter	1	2	3	4	Total
Titans	3	3	7	0	**13**
**Jaguars**	0	6	3	10	**19**

at EverBank Field, Jacksonville, Florida

- Date: November 19
- Game time: 8:25 p.m. EST/7:25 p.m. CST
- Game weather: 75 °F (24 °C), cloudy
- Game attendance: 60,121
- Referee: Craig Wrolstad
- TV announcers (NFLN): Jim Nantz, Phil Simms and Tracy Wolfson
- Recap, Gamebook

Game information

**First quarter**

- TEN – Ryan Succop 47-yard field goal, Titans 3–0. **Drive: 10 plays, 51 yards, 5:54.**

**Second quarter**

- JAX – Jason Myers 31-yard field goal, Tied 3–3. **Drive: 11 plays, 73 yards, 5:30.**
- TEN – Ryan Succop 49-yard field goal, Titans 6–3. **Drive: 9 plays, 48 yards, 3:52.**
- JAX – Jason Myers 32-yard field goal, Tied 6–6. **Drive: 5 plays, 36 yards, 0:55.**

**Third quarter**

- JAX – Jason Myers 20-yard field goal, Jaguars 9–6. **Drive: 13 plays, 78 yards, 6:50.**
- TEN – Marcus Mariota 23-yard run (Ryan Succop kick), Titans 13–9. **Drive: 5 plays, 81 yards, 2:48.**

**Fourth quarter**

- JAX – Julius Thomas 5-yard pass from Blake Bortles (Jason Myers kick), Jaguars 16–13. **Drive: 1 play, 5 yards, 0:04.**
- JAX – Jason Myers 36-yard field goal, Jaguars 19–13. **Drive: 4 plays, 9 yards, 1:00.**

**Top passers**

- TEN – Marcus Mariota – 22/35, 231 yards
- JAX – Blake Bortles – 21/30, 242 yards, TD, INT

**Top rushers**

- TEN – Antonio Andrews – 15 rushes, 78 yards
- JAX – T. J. Yeldon – 14 rushes, 54 yards

**Top receivers**

- TEN – Delanie Walker – 8 receptions, 109 yards
- JAX – Allen Robinson – 5 receptions, 113 yards

**Top tacklers**

- TEN – Coty Sensabaugh – 6 tackles
- JAX – Telvin Smith – 8 tackles, 1 assist

The Titans wore their Nike "color rush" uniforms for this game. With the loss, the Titans fell to 2-8.

==== Week 12: vs. Oakland Raiders ====
Week Twelve: Oakland Raiders at Tennessee Titans – Game summary

Quarter	1	2	3	4	Total
**Raiders**	7	3	7	7	**24**
Titans	6	0	8	7	**21**

at Nissan Stadium, Nashville, Tennessee

- Date: November 29
- Game time: 12:00 p.m. CST
- Game weather: 54 °F (12 °C), (Rain)
- Game attendance: 58,075
- Referee: Jeff Triplette
- TV announcers (CBS): Greg Gumbel, Trent Green and Jamie Erdahl
- Recap, Gamebook

Game information

**First quarter**

- TEN – Craig Stevens 20 yd. pass from Marcus Mariota (kick blocked) (5-88, 2:30), 5:53. **Titans 6-0**.
- OAK – Michael Crabtree 7 yd. pass from Derek Carr (Sebastian Janikowski kick) (7-77, 4:19), 1:34. **Raiders 7-6**.

**Second quarter**

- OAK – Sebastian Janikowski 24 yd. Field Goal (16-90, 8:10), 1:01. **Raiders 10-6**.

**Third quarter**

- OAK – Seth Roberts 10 yd. pass from Derek Carr (Sebastian Janikowski kick) (8-69, 4:15), 10:45. **Raiders 17-6**.
- TEN – Harry Douglas 13 yd. pass from Marcus Mariota (Marcus Mariota-Dorial Green-Beckham pass) (9-80, 4:23), 6:22. **Raiders 17-14**.

**Fourth quarter**

- TEN – Jalston Fowler 1 yd. pass from Marcus Mariota (Ryan Succop kick) (9-42, 4:13), 4:41. **Titans 21-17**.
- OAK – Seth Roberts 12 yd. pass from Derek Carr (Sebastian Janikowski kick) (9-90, 3:20), 1:21. **Raiders 24-21**.

**Top passers**

- OAK – Derek Carr – 24/37, 330 yards, 3 TD
- TEN – Marcus Mariota – 17/37, 218 yards, 3 TD, 2 INT

**Top rushers**

- OAK – Latavius Murray – 22 rushes, 59 yards
- TEN – Antonio Andrews – 11 rushes, 32 yards

**Top receivers**

- OAK – Amari Cooper – 7 receptions, 115 yards
- TEN – Delanie Walker – 6 receptions, 91 yards

**Top tacklers**

- OAK – Malcolm Smith – 8 tackles
- TEN – Avery Williamson – 7 tackles

The Titans led 21-17 late in the fourth quarter. However, the Raiders were able to march down the field to win it after Derek Carr threw the go-ahead touchdown to Seth Roberts with 1:21 remaining. The Titans tried to go down the field to try and tie the game, but Mariota threw an interception to Nate Allen with 50 seconds left to seal the game for Oakland. With the loss, the Titans fell to 2-9.

==== Week 13: vs. Jacksonville Jaguars ====
Week Thirteen: Jacksonville Jaguars at Tennessee Titans – Game summary

Quarter	1	2	3	4	Total
Jaguars	0	12	7	20	**39**
**Titans**	7	14	0	21	**42**

at Nissan Stadium, Nashville, Tennessee

- Date: December 6
- Game time: 12:00 p.m. CST
- Game weather: 59 °F (15 °C), (Partly Cloudy)
- Game attendance: 57,355
- Referee: Gene Steratore
- TV announcers (CBS): Brian Anderson and Chris Simms
- Recap, Gamebook

Game information

**First quarter**

- TEN – Craig Stevens 10 yd. pass from Marcus Mariota (Ryan Succop kick) (12-80, 6:38), 4:15. **Titans 7-0**.

**Second quarter**

- JAX – Rashad Greene 2 yd. pass from Blake Bortles (kick failed, wr) (10-75, 4:19), 14:56. **Titans 7-6**.
- TEN – Delanie Walker 7 yd. pass from Marcus Mariota (Ryan Succop kick) (10-90, 6:11), 8:45. **Titans 14-6**.
- JAX – T. J. Yeldon 1 yd. run (pass failed) (8-66, 3:45), 1:52. **Titans 14-12**.
- TEN – Antonio Andrews 1 yd. run (Ryan Succop kick) (9-75, 1:50), 0:02. **Titans 21-12**.

**Third quarter**

- JAX – Allen Robinson 1 yd. pass from Blake Bortles (Jason Myers kick) (14-64, 7:33), 4:52. **Titans 21-19**.

**Fourth quarter**

- TEN – Dorial Green-Beckham 47 yd. pass from Marcus Mariota (Ryan Succop kick) (9-80, 5:03), 14:49. **Titans 28-19**.
- JAX – Allen Robinson 8 yd. pass from Blake Bortles (kick failed, wl) (6-80, 2:57), 11:52. **Titans 28-25**.
- JAX – Julius Thomas 9 yd. pass from Blake Bortles (Jason Myers kick) (1-9, 0:05), 10:09. **Jaguars 32-28**.
- TEN – Marcus Mariota 87 yd. run (Ryan Succop kick) (3-90, 1:39), 8:30. **Titans35-32**.
- TEN – Wesley Woodyard 3 yd. fumble return (Ryan Succop kick), 7:46. **Titans 42-32**.
- JAX – Allen Robinson 7 yd. pass from Blake Bortles (Jason Myers kick) (4-80, 1:18), 6:28. **Titans 42-39**.

**Top passers**

- JAX – Blake Bortles – 24/36, 322 yards, 5 TD
- TEN – Marcus Mariota – 20/29, 268 yards, 3 TD, INT

**Top rushers**

- JAX – T. J. Yeldon – 15 rushes, 57 yards, TD
- TEN – Marcus Mariota – 9 rushes, 112 yards, TD

**Top receivers**

- JAX – Allen Robinson – 10 receptions, 153 yards, 3 TD
- TEN – Delanie Walker – 8 receptions, 92 yards, TD

**Top tacklers**

- JAX – Paul Posluszny – 10 tackles
- TEN – Michael Griffin – 7 tackles

The Titans entered this game needing a win to avoid being eliminated from playoff contention. The Titans outlasted the Jaguars 42-39 to improve their record to 3-9, which also improved on their win total from the previous year. This was their only inter-conference win of the season. It was also their only home win of the season.

==== Week 14: at New York Jets ====
Week Fourteen: Tennessee Titans at New York Jets – Game summary

Quarter	1	2	3	4	Total
Titans	0	0	8	0	**8**
**Jets**	10	17	0	3	**30**

at MetLife Stadium, East Rutherford, New Jersey

- Date: December 13
- Game time: 1:00 p.m. EST/12:00 p.m. CST
- Game weather: 67 °F (19 °C), clear
- Game attendance: 78,160
- Referee: Jerome Boger
- TV announcers (CBS): Kevin Harlan, Rich Gannon and Otis Livingston
- Recap, Gamebook

Game information

**First quarter**

- NYJ – Eric Decker 16 yd. pass from Ryan Fitzpatrick (Randy Bullock kick) (14-80, 5:48), 9:12. **Jets 7-0**.
- NYJ – Randy Bullock 47 yd. Field Goal (8-51, 3:06), 0:47. **Jets 10-0**.

**Second quarter**

- NYJ – Randy Bullock 27 yd. Field Goal (11-26, 4:11), 9:22. **Jets 13-0**.
- NYJ – Bilal Powell 16 yd. pass from Ryan Fitzpatrick (Randy Bullock kick) (7-72, 3:18), 4:18. **Jets 20-0**.
- NYJ – Brandon Marshall 69 yd. pass from Ryan Fitzpatrick (Randy Bullock kick) (1-69, 0:09), 1:35. **Jets 27-0**.

**Third quarter**

- TEN – Marcus Mariota 41 yd. pass from Antonio Andrews (Marcus Mariota-Dexter McCluster pass) (6-86, 4:02), 4:09. **Jets 27-8**.

**Fourth quarter**

- NYJ – Randy Bullock 42 yd. Field Goal (10-46, 5:24), 2:42. **Jets 30-8**.

**Top passers**

- TEN – Marcus Mariota – 21/39, 274 yards, TD, INT
- NYJ – Ryan Fitzpatrick – 21/36, 263 yards, 3 TD

**Top rushers**

- TEN – Dexter McCluster – 4 rushes, 12 yards
- NYJ – Chris Ivory – 22 rushes, 101 yards

**Top receivers**

- TEN – Delanie Walker – 7 receptions, 71 yards
- NYJ – Eric Decker – 7 receptions, 74 yards, TD

**Top tacklers**

- TEN – B. W. Webb – 7 tackles
- NYJ – Buster Skrine – 7 tackles

With the loss, the Titans fell to 3-10 and as a result, they were disquailified from the playoffs for the 7th year in a row.

==== Week 15: at New England Patriots ====
Week Fifteen: Tennessee Titans at New England Patriots – Game summary

Quarter	1	2	3	4	Total
Titans	0	3	7	6	**16**
**Patriots**	7	17	3	6	**33**

at Gillette Stadium, Foxborough, Massachusetts

- Date: December 20
- Game time: 1:00 p.m. EST
- Game weather: 40 °F (4 °C), sunny
- Game attendance: 66,829
- Referee: Walt Coleman
- TV announcers (CBS): Ian Eagle, Dan Fouts and Evan Washburn
- Recap, Gamebook

Game information

**First quarter**

- NE – Rob Gronkowski 5-yard pass from Tom Brady, (Stephen Gostkowski kick), 7:10. Patriots 7–0. **Drive: 11 plays, 79 yards, 6:27.**

**Second quarter**

- NE – Akiem Hicks fumble recovery in end zone (Stephen Gostkowski kick), 13:48. Patriots 14–0.
- TEN – Ryan Succop 49-yard field goal, 9:44. Patriots 14–3. **Drive: 4 plays, -5 yards, 1:40.**
- NE – James White 30-yard pass from Tom Brady, (Stephen Gostkowski kick), 9:23. Patriots 21–3. **Drive: 2 plays, 30 yards, 0:21.**
- NE – Stephen Gostkowski 43-yard field goal, 1:44. Patriots 24–3. **Drive: 8 plays, 37 yards, 3:16.**

**Third quarter**

- TEN – Delanie Walker 7-yard pass from Zach Mettenberger, (Ryan Succop kick), 10:05. Patriots 24–10. **Drive: 7 plays, 59 yards, 3:58.**
- NE – Stephen Gostkowski 38-yard field goal, 5:09. Patriots 27–10. **Drive: 11 plays, 60 yards, 4:56.**

**Fourth quarter**

- TEN – Delanie Walker 57-yard pass from Zach Mettenberger, (kick failed, wr), 6:52. Patriots 27–16. **Drive: 1 play, 57 yards, 0:12.**
- NE – Stephen Gostkowski 42-yard field goal, 3:30. Patriots 30–16. **Drive: 9 plays, 57 yards, 3:22.**
- NE – Stephen Gostkowski 32-yard field goal, 1:06. Patriots 33–16. **Drive: 4 plays, 2 yards, 1:08.**

**Top passers**

- TEN – Zach Mettenberger – 20/28, 242 yards, 2 TD, 2 INT
- NE – Tom Brady – 23/35, 267 yards, 2 TD

**Top rushers**

- TEN – Antonio Andrews – 14 rushes, 45 yards
- NE – Joey Iosefa – 14 rushes, 51 yards

**Top receivers**

- TEN – Dorial Green-Beckham – 6 receptions, 113 yards
- NE – Brandon LaFell – 4 receptions, 88 yards

**Top tacklers**

- TEN – Avery Williamson – 5 tackles, 4 assists on tackles
- NE – Jamie Collins – 4 tackles, 4 assists on tackles, sack

With the loss, the Titans fell to 3-11 and they were swept by the AFC East.

==== Week 16: vs. Houston Texans ====
Week Sixteen: Houston Texans at Tennessee Titans – Game summary

Quarter	1	2	3	4	Total
**Texans**	10	7	17	0	**34**
Titans	0	0	0	6	**6**

at Nissan Stadium, Nashville, Tennessee

- Date: December 27
- Game time: 12:00 p.m. CST
- Game weather: 75 °F (24 °C), (Cloudy)
- Game attendance: 62,153
- Referee: Brad Allen
- TV announcers (CBS): Spero Dedes and Solomon Wilcots
- Recap, Gamebook

Game information

**First quarter**

- HOU – Quintin Demps 33 yd. fumble return (Nick Novak kick), 13:01. **Texans 7-0**.
- HOU – Nick Novak 22 yd. Field Goal (4-7, 2:05), 3:19. **Texans 10-0**.

**Second quarter**

- HOU – Brandon Weeden 7 yd. run (Nick Novak kick) (6-65, 2:58), 2:32. **Texans 17-0**.

**Third quarter**

- HOU – DeAndre Hopkins 15 yd. pass from Brandon Weeden (Nick Novak kick) (8-80, 3:27), 11:33. **Texans 24-0**.
- HOU – Nate Washington 13 yd. pass from Brandon Weeden (Nick Novak kick) (6-34, 2:49), 6:12. **Texans 31-0**.
- HOU – Nick Novak 36 yd. Field Goal (9-48, 4:44), 0:54. **Texans 34-0**.

**Fourth quarter**

- TEN – Tre McBride 1 yd. pass from Zach Mettenberger (pass failed) (10-70, 2:08), 1:31. **Texans 34-6**.

**Top passers**

- HOU – Brandon Weeden — 15/24, 200 yards, 2 TD
- TEN – Zach Mettenberger — 27/51, 234 yards, TD, INT

**Top rushers**

- HOU – Alfred Blue — 15 rushes, 45 yards
- TEN – David Cobb — 7 rushes, 18 yards

**Top receivers**

- HOU – DeAndre Hopkins — 7 receptions, 117 yards, TD
- TEN – Delanie Walker — 9 receptions, 59 yards

**Top tacklers**

- HOU – Kareem Jackson — 5 tackles
- TEN – Michael Griffin — 9 tackles

With the loss, the Titans fell to 3-12 and finished 1-7 at home for the second straight season.

==== Week 17: at Indianapolis Colts ====
Week Seventeen: Tennessee Titans at Indianapolis Colts – Game summary

Quarter	1	2	3	4	Total
Titans	7	7	3	7	**24**
**Colts**	10	10	7	3	**30**

at Lucas Oil Stadium, Indianapolis, Indiana

- Date: January 3, 2016
- Game time: 1:00 p.m. EST/12:00 p.m. CST
- Game weather: Played indoors (retractable roof closed)
- Game attendance: 65,733
- Referee: Clete Blakeman
- TV announcers (CBS): Andrew Catalon, Steve Beuerlein and Steve Tasker
- Recap, Gamebook

Game information

**First quarter**

- IND – Adam Vinatieri 49 yd. Field Goal (13-49, 6:03), 8:57. **Colts 3-0**.
- TEN – Zach Mettenberger 5 yd. run (Ryan Succop kick) (1-5, 0:04), 2:21. **Titans 7-3**.
- IND – Coby Fleener 57 yd. pass from Josh Freeman (Adam Vinatieri kick) (4-69, 2:09), 0:12. **Colts 10-7**.

**Second quarter**

- TEN – David Cobb 1 yd. run (Ryan Succop kick) (11-80, 4:47), 10:25. **Titans 14-10**.
- IND – Adam Vinatieri 52 yd. Field Goal (7-46, 3:56), 6:29. **Titans 14-13**.
- IND – Andre Johnson 18 yd. pass from Ryan Lindley (Adam Vinatieri kick) (8-58, 1:26), 0:13. **Colts 20-14**.

**Third quarter**

- IND – Jerrell Freeman 23 yd. interception return (Adam Vinatieri kick), 14:19. **Colts 27-14**.
- TEN – Ryan Succop 49 yd. Field Goal (11-49, 6:49), 7:30. **Colts 27-17**.

**Fourth quarter**

- TEN – Dorial Green-Beckham 5 yd. pass from Alex Tanney (Ryan Succop kick) (6-59, 3:05), 11:07. **Colts 27-24**.
- IND – Adam Vinatieri 35 yd. Field Goal (13-33, 6:02), 2:25. **Colts 30-24**.

**Top passers**

- TEN — Alex Tanney — 10/14, 99 yards, TD
- IND — Josh Freeman — 15/28, 149 yards, TD, INT

**Top rushers**

- TEN — David Cobb — 19 rushes, 73 yards, TD
- IND — Frank Gore — 19 rushes, 76 yards

**Top receivers**

- TEN — Delanie Walker — 9 receptions, 94 yards
- IND — Coby Fleener — 7 receptions, 88 yards, TD

**Top tacklers**

- TEN — Avery Williamson — 8 tackles
- IND — Jerrell Freeman — 6 tackles

The loss ends the Titans season with a losing record of 3-13, tying the Cleveland Browns for the worst record this season, and statistically (based on percentages) gives them the right to the top pick in the 2016 NFL Draft. They also lost their 9th straight game against the Colts. The Titans also finished 1-5 against the AFC South and 2-6 on the road.

== Standings ==
=== Division ===
AFC South
	W	L	T	PCT	DIV	CONF	PF	PA	STK
^{(4)} Houston Texans	9	7	0	.563	5–1	7–5	339	313	W3
Indianapolis Colts	8	8	0	.500	4–2	6–6	333	408	W2
Jacksonville Jaguars	5	11	0	.313	2–4	5–7	376	448	L3
Tennessee Titans	3	13	0	.188	1–5	1–11	299	423	L4

=== Conference ===
AFC
#	Team	Division	W	L	T	PCT	DIV	CONF	SOS	SOV	STK
Division Leaders
1 (Note: Denver finished ahead of New England and Cincinnati for the No. 1 seed based on head-to-head sweep. New England finished ahead of Cincinnati for the No. 2 seed based on record vs. common opponents — New England's cumulative record against Buffalo, Denver, Houston and Pittsburgh was 4–1, while Cincinnati's cumulative record against the same four teams was 2–3.)	Denver Broncos	West	12	4	0	.750	4–2	8–4	.500	.479	W2
2	New England Patriots	East	12	4	0	.750	4–2	9–3	.473	.448	L2
3	Cincinnati Bengals	North	12	4	0	.750	5–1	9–3	.477	.406	W1
4	Houston Texans	South	9	7	0	.563	5–1	7–5	.496	.410	W3
Wild Cards
5	Kansas City Chiefs	West	11	5	0	.688	5–1	10–2	.496	.432	W10
6 (Note: Pittsburgh finished ahead of the New York Jets for the No. 6 seed and qualified for the last playoff spot based on record vs. common opponents — Pittsburgh's cumulative record against Cleveland, Indianapolis, New England and Oakland was 4–1, while the Jets' cumulative record against the same four teams was 3–2.)	Pittsburgh Steelers	North	10	6	0	.625	3–3	7–5	.504	.463	W1
Did not qualify for the postseason
7	New York Jets	East	10	6	0	.625	3–3	7–5	.441	.388	L1
8 (Note: Buffalo finished ahead of Indianapolis based on head-to-head victory.)	Buffalo Bills	East	8	8	0	.500	4–2	7–5	.508	.438	W2
9	Indianapolis Colts	South	8	8	0	.500	4–2	6–6	.500	.406	W2
10	Oakland Raiders	West	7	9	0	.438	3–3	7–5	.512	.366	L1
11	Miami Dolphins	East	6	10	0	.375	1–5	4–8	.469	.469	W2
12 (Note: Jacksonville finished ahead of Baltimore based on head-to-head victory.)	Jacksonville Jaguars	South	5	11	0	.313	2–4	5–7	.473	.375	L3
13	Baltimore Ravens	North	5	11	0	.313	3–3	4–8	.508	.425	L1
14	San Diego Chargers	West	4	12	0	.250	0–6	3–9	.527	.328	L2
15 (Note: Cleveland finished ahead of Tennessee based on head-to-head victory.)	Cleveland Browns	North	3	13	0	.188	1–5	2–10	.531	.271	L3
16	Tennessee Titans	South	3	13	0	.188	1–5	1–11	.492	.375	L4
Tiebreakers (Note: When breaking ties for three or more teams under the NFL's rules, they are first broken within divisions, then comparing only the highest ranked remaining team from each division.)
