= List of Tennessee Titans head coaches =

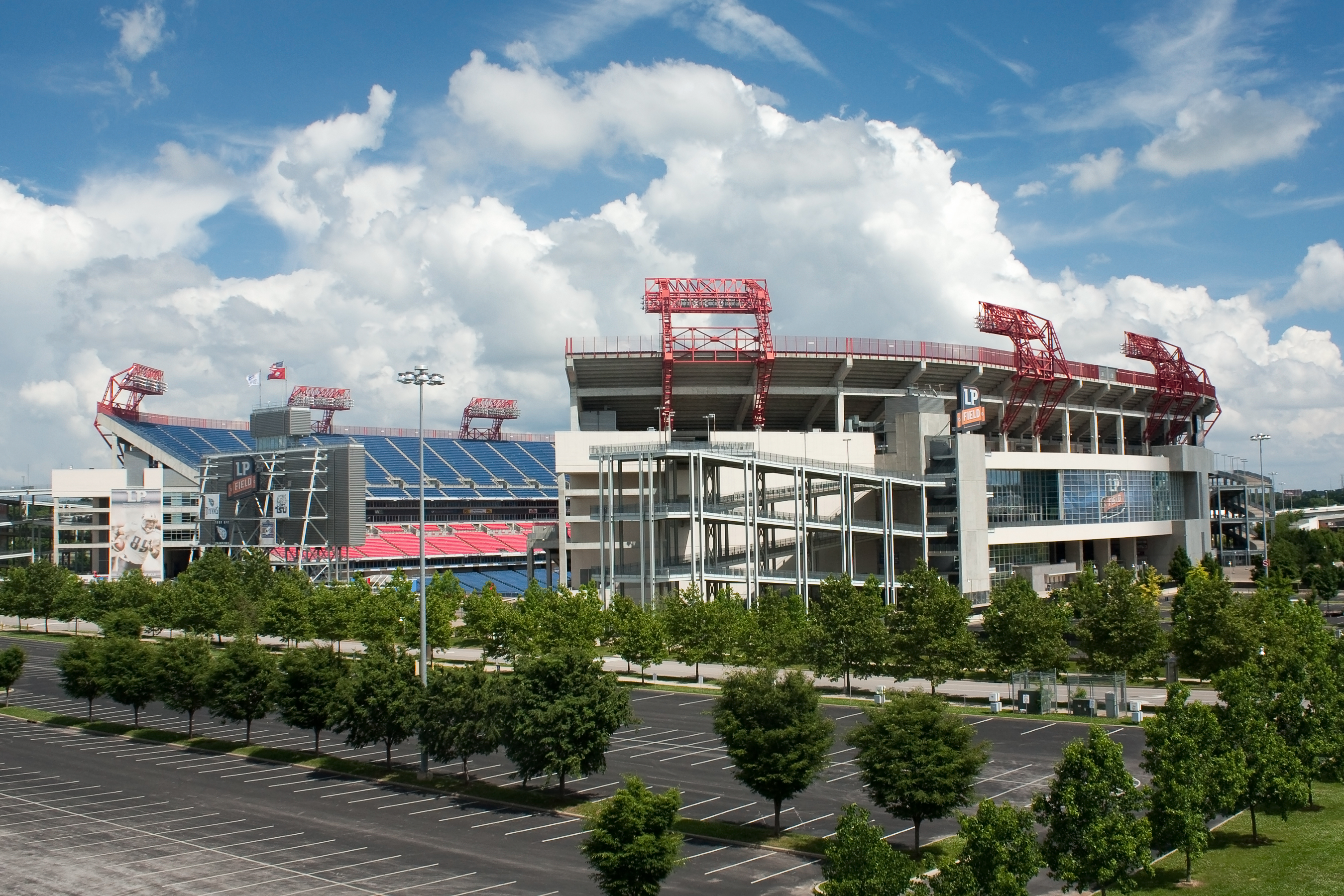
The Titans have played in Nissan Stadium (formerly LP Field) since 1999.

The Tennessee Titans, previously known as the Houston Oilers and Tennessee Oilers, are a professional American football team based in Nashville, Tennessee. They are a member of the South division of the American Football Conference (AFC) in the National Football League (NFL). The Tennessee Titans have had 20 head coaches in its franchise history. As the Houston Oilers based in Houston, Texas, the team began playing in 1960 as a charter member of the American Football League (AFL). The Oilers won two AFL championships before joining the NFL as part of the AFL-NFL merger. The team relocated to Tennessee in 1997 and played in Memphis for one season before moving to Nashville. For two seasons, the team was known as the Tennessee Oilers before changing its name to the Titans in 1999.

Head coach Jeff Fisher led the Titans to their only Super Bowl appearance in Super Bowl XXXIV following the 1999 season. He continued his success with playoff appearances in 2000, 2002, and 2003. His coaching career began to decline and, from 2004 to 2010, his only playoff appearances included 2007 and 2008. In January 2011, it was announced that Fisher and the Titans had mutually parted ways. Fisher's tenure at head coach from 1994 to 2010 included six playoff appearances, one AFC Championship appearance, and one Super Bowl appearance. His 142 wins and 120 losses are each a franchise record for a Titans head coach.

Following Fisher, the Titans promoted former player and longtime offensive line coach Mike Munchak to head coach. He missed the playoffs from 2011 to 2013 before being fired in January 2014. Ken Whisenhunt became head coach shortly after, and tied a franchise worst 2–14 record in 2014. Mike Mularkey, who was originally hired as tight ends coach in 2014 and promoted to assistant head coach in 2015, replaced Whisenhunt on an interim basis after a 1–6 start in 2015. Mularkey was retained as head coach and led the Titans to two 9–7 seasons, including a playoff appearance in 2017.

Mularkey and the Titans agreed to part ways in January 2018. Former NFL player and coach, Mike Vrabel, was hired as head coach soon after. In his first four seasons, Vrabel led the Titans to an AFC Championship appearance in 2019, back-to-back AFC South division titles in 2020 and 2021, and earned the #1 seed for the AFC in the 2021–22 NFL playoffs. For his team's performance in 2021, Vrabel was named that season's NFL Coach of the Year. After back-to-back losing seasons in 2022 and 2023, Vrabel was fired by the Titans in January 2024. Shortly afterwards, former Cincinnati Bengals offensive coordinator Brian Callahan was hired as the franchise's 20th head coach. After going 3–14 in 2024, and beginning the season 1–5 in 2025, Callahan was fired in October of that year. The Titans then named senior offensive assistant Mike McCoy, who had been a head coach for the San Diego Chargers earlier in his career, as their new interim head coach. The current head coach of the Titans is Robert Saleh.

== Key ==
#	Number of coaches^{[a]}
GC	Games coached
W	Wins
L	Losses
T	Ties
Win%	Winning percentage
†	Elected into the Pro Football Hall of Fame as a coach
‡	Elected into the Pro Football Hall of Fame as a player
*	Spent entire NFL head coaching career with the Oilers/Titans

== Coaches ==
Note: Statistics are correct through the end of the 2025 NFL season.

#	Image	Name	Term ^{[b]}	Regular season					Playoffs				Achievements	Reference
#	Image	Name	Term ^{[b]}	GC	W	L	T	Win%	GC	W	L	Win%	Achievements	Reference
Houston Oilers
1		Lou Rymkus*	1960–1961*	19	11	7	1	.605	1	1	0	1.000	UPI AFL Coach of the Year (1960); AFL Championship (1960)	
2		Wally Lemm^{[c]}	1961	9	9	0	0	1.000	1	1	0	1.000	UPI AFL Coach of the Year (1961); AFL Championship (1961)	
3		Pop Ivy	1962–1963	28	17	11	0	.607	1	0	1	.000		
4		Sammy Baugh ‡	1964	14	4	10	0	.286	0	0	0	–		
5		Hugh Taylor*	1965*	14	4	10	0	.286	0	0	0	–		
–		Wally Lemm^{[c]}	1966–1970	70	28	38	4	.429	2	0	2	.000		
6		Ed Hughes*	1971*	14	4	9	1	.321	0	0	0	–		
7		Bill Peterson*	1972–1973*	19	1	18	0	.053	0	0	0	–		
8		Sid Gillman †	1973–1974	23	8	15	0	.348	0	0	0	–	UPI NFL Coach of the Year (1974)	
9		Bum Phillips	1975–1980	90	55	35	0	.611	7	4	3	.571		
10		Ed Biles*	1981–1983*	31	8	23	0	.258	0	0	0	–		
11		Chuck Studley*	1983*	10	2	8	0	.200	0	0	0	–		
12		Hugh Campbell*	1984–1985*	30	8	22	0	.267	0	0	0	–		
13		Jerry Glanville	1985–1989	65	33	32	0	.508	5	2	3	.400		
14		Jack Pardee	1990–1994	74	43	31	0	.581	5	1	4	.200		
15		Jeff Fisher^{[d]}	1994–1996	38	16	22	0	.421	0	0	0	–		
15		Jeff Fisher^{[d]}	Tennessee Oilers											
15		Jeff Fisher^{[d]}	1997–1998	32	16	16	0	.500	0	0	0	–		
15		Jeff Fisher^{[d]}	Tennessee Titans											
15		Jeff Fisher^{[d]}	1999–2010	192	110	82	0	.573	11	5	6	.455		
16		Mike Munchak ‡*	2011–2013*	48	22	26	0	.458	0	0	0	–		
17		Ken Whisenhunt	2014–2015	23	3	20	0	.130	0	0	0	–		
18		Mike Mularkey	2015–2017	41	20	21	0	.488	2	1	1	.500		
19		Mike Vrabel	2018–2023	99	54	45	0	.545	5	2	3	.400	AP Coach of the Year (2021)	
20		Brian Callahan*	2024–2025*	23	4	19	0	.174	0	0	0	–		
21		Mike McCoy	2025	11	2	9	0	.182	0	0	0	–		
22		Robert Saleh	2026–present	7	1	6	0	.143	0	0	0	.000		

== Notes ==
- ^{a} A running total of the number of Oilers/Titans head coaches. Thus, any head coach who has two or more terms is only counted once.
- ^{b} Each year is linked to an article about that particular Oilers/Titans season.
- ^{c} Wally Lemm's full coaching record with the Oilers is 79 regular season games coached with a record of 37–38–4 and a W–L percentage of .494, and 3 playoff games coached with a record of 1–2 and a W–L percentage of .333.
- ^{d} Jeff Fisher's full coaching record with the Oilers/Titans is 262 regular season games coached with a record of 142–120–0 and a W–L percentage of .542, and 11 playoff games coached with a record of 5–6 and a W–L percentage of .455.
