= Ken Whisenhunt =

American football player and coach (born 1962)

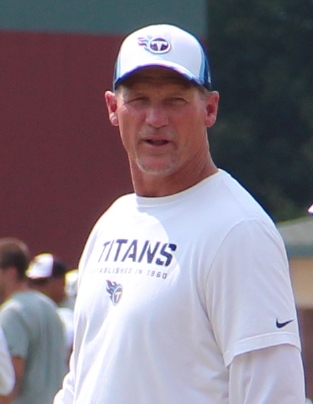
- Whisenhunt with the Tennessee Titans in 2014

No. 45, 48, 86
- Position: Tight end

Personal information
- Born: February 28, 1962 (age 64); Augusta, Georgia, U.S.
- Listed height: 6 ft 3 in (1.91 m)
- Listed weight: 233 lb (106 kg)

Career information
- High school: Richmond County (Augusta)
- College: Georgia Tech (1980–1984)
- NFL draft: 1985: 12th round, 313th overall pick

Career history

Playing
- Atlanta Falcons (1985–1988); Washington Redskins (1989–1990); New York Jets (1991–1992)

Coaching
- Vanderbilt (1995–1996) Special teams, tight ends, H-backs coach; Baltimore Ravens (1997–1998) Tight ends coach; Cleveland Browns (1999) Special teams coach; New York Jets (2000) Special teams coach; Pittsburgh Steelers (2001–2006); Tight ends coach (2001–2003); Offensive coordinator (2004–2006); Arizona Cardinals (2007–2012) Head coach; San Diego Chargers (2013) Offensive coordinator; Tennessee Titans (2014–2015) Head coach; San Diego / Los Angeles Chargers (2016–2019) Offensive coordinator; Penn State (2021–2022) Offensive analyst; Alabama (2023) Special assistant to the head coach; Memphis Showboats (2025) Head coach

Awards and highlights
- As assistant coach: Super Bowl champion (XL); PFWA NFL Assistant Coach of the Year (2013); First-team All-ACC (1984)

Career NFL statistics
- Receptions: 62
- Receiving yards: 596
- Receiving touchdowns: 5
- Stats at Pro Football Reference

Head coaching record
- Regular season: 48–71 (.403)
- Postseason: 4–2 (.667)
- Career: 52–73 (.416)
- Coaching profile at Pro Football Reference

Kenneth Moore Whisenhunt (born February 28, 1962) is an American football coach and former tight end. He played college football at Georgia Tech and was selected in the twelfth round of the 1985 NFL draft by the Atlanta Falcons, with whom he played for four years. Whisenhunt subsequently played two more years with the Washington Redskins and another two with the New York Jets.

Beginning his coaching career in 1995, Whisenhunt was head coach of the Arizona Cardinals from 2007 to 2012 and Tennessee Titans from 2014 to 2015. He led the Cardinals to their first Super Bowl appearance in franchise history during the 2008 season, as well as their first home playoff games in 60 years. However, following the retirement of Kurt Warner, Whisenhunt posted three straight non-winning seasons and was fired by the Cardinals. He was fired by the Titans after compiling a record of 3–20 through 1 1/2 years. Overall, Whisenhunt posted a record of 48–71 as head coach, including a 4–31 record in his last 35 games as a head coach. Whisenhunt was 4–2 in the playoffs, but missed them in five of his seven seasons as coach. Among all coaches who have won a conference championship as a coach, Whisenhunt has the lowest winning percentage at .403.

Prior to and after his tenures as head coach of the Cardinals and Titans, Whisenhunt served as an offensive coordinator to various NFL teams. He had success with the Pittsburgh Steelers in his three years as their offensive coordinator under Bill Cowher and winning Super Bowl XL over the Seattle Seahawks during the 2005 season. Most recently, Whisenhunt served as the offensive coordinator for the Los Angeles Chargers for four seasons before being fired on October 28, 2019.

== College career ==
After attending the Academy of Richmond County in Augusta, Georgia for high school, Whisenhunt played college football at Georgia Tech (1980–84) where he graduated with a degree in civil engineering. As a senior, Whisenhunt was an honorable mention All-American. He finished first-team all-ACC during his final two college seasons.

- 1981: 22 catches for 295 yards and 2 TD.
- 1982: 15 catches for 208 yards.
- 1983: 18 catches for 244 yards and 2 TD.
- 1984: 27 catches for 517 yards and 3 TD.

== NFL playing career ==
Whisenhunt's career as a player included four years (1985–88) as a tight end with the Atlanta Falcons, who selected him in the twelfth round of the 1985 NFL draft. Whisenhunt had short stints of two seasons each with the Washington Redskins and New York Jets. He retired from the league in 1993 after nine seasons, in which he was mostly known as a blocking back. From 1986 to 1988 with Atlanta, Whisenhunt accumulated 53 receptions for 503 yards with five touchdowns.

== Coaching career ==
=== Early career ===
Whisenhunt began his coaching career at Vanderbilt University, where he coached special teams, tight ends and running backs for the Commodores from 1995 to 1996. In 1997, Whisenhunt returned to the National Football League as the tight ends coach for the Baltimore Ravens.

Whisenhunt was a transient in his early years in the league, moving to the staff of the Cleveland Browns in 1999 and to the New York Jets the following season.

=== Pittsburgh Steelers ===
In 2001, Whisenhunt was hired by the Steelers to coach their tight ends. He was able to develop players such as Mark Bruener and Jay Riemersma, both considered past their prime, into excellent tight ends. Whisenhunt also oversaw the early development of tight end Heath Miller, who was a successful tight end in the league.

Whisenhunt became the Steelers' offensive coordinator for the 2004 season after Mike Mularkey left to become head coach of the Buffalo Bills. While Mularkey was known for incorporating trick plays into the offense, Whisenhunt adopted a more conservative approach, using trick plays selectively alongside the team's run oriented offense.

One of Whisenhunt's most famous moments as a Steeler is the trick play that he called in Super Bowl XL. With Pittsburgh leading 14–10 over the Seattle Seahawks, Whisenhunt called a wide receiver reverse pass (Antwaan Randle El to Hines Ward, the first TD pass thrown by a WR in Super Bowl history) that allowed Pittsburgh to extend the lead over the Seahawks.

=== Arizona Cardinals ===
On January 14, 2007, the Arizona Cardinals hired Whisenhunt as their new head coach, with a contract to receive an average of $2.5 million annually. Whisenhunt had also interviewed for the head coaching position with the Pittsburgh Steelers, Atlanta Falcons, and Miami Dolphins. He was previously interviewed to be the head coach of the Oakland Raiders in February 2006, but he pulled out of talks before an offer could be made.

The Cardinals showed improvement in Whisenhunt's first season, finishing 8–8 after finishing 5–11 the previous two seasons and losing 10 or more games in seven of the previous eight campaigns. It was their first non-losing season since 1998, though the Cardinals still failed to make the playoffs.

Going into his second season in 2008, Whisenhunt made the decision to go with veteran quarterback Kurt Warner as his starter. In previous seasons, Warner had split time with the team's younger quarterback Matt Leinart, although Warner started the final 11 games of the 2007 season after Leinart suffered a season-ending injury. This decision paid off as Warner put up great numbers in leading the Cardinals to a 9–7 regular season record and the NFC West Division championship, the Cardinals' first division title since 1975, when the team played in St. Louis, and the club's first playoff berth since 1998. It also allowed the Cardinals to play in only their second home playoff game in franchise history, and their first since winning the NFL championship in 1947, while the team was still in Chicago (they never played a home playoff game in St. Louis despite winning two division titles there). After defeating the Atlanta Falcons and the Carolina Panthers in the first two rounds of the NFC playoffs, the Cardinals defeated the Philadelphia Eagles in the NFC Championship Game on January 18, 2009, and advanced to the Super Bowl for the first time in franchise history to face his former employer, the Pittsburgh Steelers. Whisenhunt's Cardinals lost to the Steelers 27–23 Super Bowl XLIII.

The following season in 2009, Whisenhunt led the Cardinals to a 10–6 record and another NFC West title. During the Wild Card Round, the Cardinals defeated the Green Bay Packers 51–45 in a thrilling overtime victory before losing to the eventual Super Bowl XLIV champion New Orleans Saints 45–14 in the Divisional Round.

Following the retirement of Warner and a number of other losses at other positions, the Cardinals were not expected to fare well during the 2010 season. Leinart had been expected to regain his starting quarterback job. Instead, Whisenhunt installed free agent pickup Derek Anderson as the starter, made rookie Max Hall the backup, and released Leinart. The Cardinals finished 5–11 and last in the division.

In 2011, despite ongoing quarterback issues, Whisenhunt and the team management put together a solid young roster that finished with an 8–8 record.

In 2012, Whisenhunt guided the Cardinals to their first 4–0 start since 1974, when the franchise was coached by Don Coryell in St. Louis. The Cardinals proceeded to lose 9 straight games and in week 14 were blown out by the Seattle Seahawks 58–0. The losing streak finally ended the following week with a 38–10 victory over the Detroit Lions.

On December 31, 2012, Whisenhunt was fired after three straight non-playoff seasons. Rod Graves, general manager at the time, was also relieved of his duties. He would be succeeded by Bruce Arians.

=== San Diego Chargers (first stint) ===
On January 17, 2013, Whisenhunt was hired as offensive coordinator for the San Diego Chargers under new head coach Mike McCoy. During the 2013 season under Whisenhunt, the Chargers' finished fifth in the league in total offense, compared to 31st the season before.

=== Tennessee Titans ===
On January 13, 2014, the Tennessee Titans hired Whisenhunt as their new head coach. He had also interviewed for the head coaching position with the Detroit Lions and Cleveland Browns. In Whisenhunt's first year, the Titans regressed heavily from their 2013 mark of 7–9, finishing with a 2–14 record and tying the Buccaneers for the worst record in the NFL.

On November 3, 2015, after starting the season 1–6, the Titans fired Whisenhunt and named Mike Mularkey the interim head coach. Whisenhunt finished with a 3–20 record during his tenure with the team.

=== Los Angeles/San Diego Chargers (second stint) ===
On January 13, 2016, the Chargers re-hired Whisenhunt as their offensive coordinator.

On December 4, 2018, it was rumored that Whisenhunt would take the head coaching job at Georgia Tech, where he and AD Todd Stansbury played football at Tech together. However, Whisenhunt ultimately turned down the offer and stayed with the Chargers.

On October 28, 2019, a day after the Chargers narrowly defeated the Chicago Bears, Whisenhunt was fired. At the time, the Chargers were 17th in total yards and 24th in points scored, including failing to score more than 20 points in October.

=== Penn State Nittany Lions ===
In 2021, Whisenhunt joined Penn State as an offensive analyst.

=== Alabama Crimson Tide ===
On February 16, 2023, it was reported the Whisenhunt had been hired by Alabama to serve as the special assistant to head coach Nick Saban.

=== Memphis Showboats ===
On September 23, 2024, it was announced that Whisenhunt would become the new head coach of the Memphis Showboats of the United Football League (UFL). He left the team on March 24, 2025, returned a week later, then permanently resigned on April 16.

=== Father Ryan ===
Whisenhunt now works as an assistant coach at Father Ryan High School in Nashville, Tennessee, under head coach Zach Mettenberger.

== Head coaching record ==
=== NFL ===
Team	Year	Regular season					Postseason			
Team	Year	Won	Lost	Ties	Win %	Finish	Won	Lost	Win %	Result
ARI	2007	8	8	0	.500	2nd in NFC West	—	—	—	—
ARI	2008	9	7	0	.560	1st in NFC West	3	1	.750	Lost to Pittsburgh Steelers in Super Bowl XLIII
ARI	2009	10	6	0	.625	1st in NFC West	1	1	.500	Lost to New Orleans Saints in NFC Divisional Game
ARI	2010	5	11	0	.313	4th in NFC West	—	—	—	—
ARI	2011	8	8	0	.500	2nd in NFC West	—	—	—	—
ARI	2012	5	11	0	.313	4th in NFC West	—	—	—	—
ARI Total		45	51	0	.469		4	2	.667	
TEN	2014	2	14	0	.125	4th in AFC South	—	—	—	—
TEN	2015	1	6	0	.143	Fired	—	—	—	—
TEN total		3	20	0	.130		0	0	.000	
Total		48	71	0	.403		4	2	.667	

=== UFL ===
League	Team	Year	Regular season				Postseason			
League	Team	Year	Won	Lost	Win %	Finish	Won	Lost	Win %	Result
UFL	MEM	2025	0	2	.000	Resigned	-	-	-	-
Total			0	2	.000		0	0	.000	

== Personal life ==
Ken and his wife, Alice, have two children: Kenneth Jr. and Mary Ashley.

Whisenhunt is an avid golfer. A native of Augusta, Georgia, he worked the 18th-hole manual scoreboard as a teenager at the Masters Tournament, the PGA’s first major of the year. Whisenhunt contemplated a career in professional golf and after retiring as a player in 1993, he spent a year away from football and played golf extensively, including competing in the '94 U.S. Mid-Amateur at the Hazeltine National Golf Club in Chaska, Minnesota.
