= Yannik Cudjoe-Virgil =

American football player (born 1992)

No. 40
- Position: Outside linebacker

Personal information
- Born: 28 November 1992 (age 33); Trinidad
- Listed height: 6 ft 2 in (1.88 m)
- Listed weight: 248 lb (112 kg)

Career information
- High school: Towson
- College: Maryland
- NFL draft: 2015: undrafted

Career history
- Tennessee Titans (2015)

Career NFL statistics
- Games played: 2
- Stats at Pro Football Reference

Yannik Cudjoe-Virgil (born 28 November 1992) is a former American football outside linebacker for National Football League (NFL). He played college football at the University of Maryland College Park where he was a pre-season selection in 2014 for the Butkus Award as the best linebacker in college football. As of 2019 he was working in real estate.

== Early life ==
Cudjoe-Virgil attended and played high school football at Towson High School.

== College career ==
=== Seton Hill University ===
==== Freshman season (2010) ====
As a freshman at Seton Hill University, he played in 10 of 11 games and posted 14 tackles on the year. He contributed on special teams.

==== Sophomore season (2011) ====
As a sophomore he was elected team captain in the spring. Played all 11 games at Defensive End. Posted 44 tackles, including 8 tackles for loss and 5 sacks. Currently holds the single season school record for blocked kicks in a season (6) including a record of two in one game.

=== Maryland ===
==== Junior season (2012) ====
As a junior, he transferred to the University of Maryland College Park and joined the team as a walk-on where he redshirted

due to NCAA transfer rules. Earned a scholarship prior to the 2013 season.

==== Redshirt junior season (2013) ====
As a redshirt junior he was elected team captain. Cudjoe-Virgil made his Maryland debut against FIU (8/31) before making his first career start and notching a sack against Old Dominion (9/7). He tailed 7 tackles, 2.5 sacks and 3 tackles for loss against Connecticut

(9/14). Cudjoe-Virgil recorded his first interception against West Virginia (9/21). After 6 games he suffered a season-ending injury (torn pectoral muscle).

==== Redshirt senior season (2014) ====
As a redshirt senior he was one of 51 selected in the preseason for the Butkus Award watch list for the best linebacker in college football.

Elected team captain, Cudjoe-Virgil suffered a foot injury during training camp and missed the first 3 regular season games.

He appeared in 9 games and recorded 2 sacks and 2.5 TFL. After his redshirt senior season, Cudjoe-Virgil entered the 2015 NFL draft.

== Professional career ==
Cudjoe-Virgil was selected to participate in the 2015 NFL Combine. He was unable to participate due to injury. He bench pressed 225 lbs 25 times. At pro-day, he was clocked in at 4.5 to 4.6 in the 40 yard dash by NFL scouts.

Ht	Wt	Arm length	Hand size	40-yard dash	Bench Press	20-ss	3-cone	Vert jump	Broad
6 ft 2 in (1.88m)	248 lbs (112 kg)	32 5/8 in (0.82 m)	9 3/4 in (0.24 m)	4.53 s	27 Reps	4.25 s	7.18 s	30 in (0.76 m)	9 ft 10 in(2.69 m)
All values from NFL Combine

The Tennessee Titans signed Cudjoe-Virgil after the 2015 NFL draft to a 3-year 1.56M contract. After a strong mini-camp by national writers, he appeared in his first preseason game against the Atlanta Falcons on 14 August 2015. He suffered a torn hamstring and was placed on injured reserve. Cudjoe-Virgil made his debut for the Tennessee Titans week 12 on 29 November 2015. In week 14 he suffered a season ending torn patella tendon. He was placed on injured reserve for the remainer of the season.

Cudjoe-Virgil suffered a re-tear of his torn patella tendon during rehabilitation and missed all of the 2016 season. He was released by the Tennessee Titans prior to the 2016 season.
