= Will Poehls =

American football player (born 1991)

No. 75
- Position: Offensive tackle

Personal information
- Born: November 27, 1991 (age 34); Chandler, Arizona, U.S.
- Listed height: 6 ft 8 in (2.03 m)
- Listed weight: 344 lb (156 kg)

Career information
- High school: Chandler (Chandler, Arizona)
- College: Montana
- NFL draft: 2014: undrafted

Career history
- Tennessee Titans (2014–2016)*; Buffalo Bills (2016)*; Chicago Bears (2016–2017)*; Jacksonville Jaguars (2017); Indianapolis Colts (2019)*; Tampa Bay Buccaneers (2019)*
- * Offseason or practice squad member only
- Stats at Pro Football Reference

William Robert Poehls (born November 27, 1991) is an American former football offensive tackle. He played college football at Montana.

== Early life ==
Attended Chandler (Ariz.) High School and earned three letters in both football and wrestling and was a team captain in both sports. Was a 5A first-team All-State and All-Region selection as a senior and All-Region as a junior. Had a record of 16-2 as a heavyweight wrestler his junior season. His good friends Donald Holy, Nathan Grimm, Michael Johnson and Tyler Johnson were his inspiration while playing flag football in a local recreation league.

== College career ==
Poehls was a two-year starter at Montana who played in 45 career games with 27 starts. He played in a reserve role as a freshman and played in all 14 games and started in two as a sophomore. As a junior, he started in all 11 games at right guard. As a senior, started in all 13 games for the 10-3 Grizzlies at right guard and was a second-team All-Big Sky Conference selection. He majored in sociology at Montana.

== Professional career ==
=== Tennessee Titans ===
The Tennessee Titans signed Poehls as a rookie free agent on May 16, 2014 to provide competition at the offensive tackle position. The 6-foot-8-inch, 334-pounder is a physical lineman who is capable of playing both tackle spots. The Montana product spent the entirety of his first two campaigns on the Titans’ practice squad. On September 2, 2016, Poehls was released by the Titans as part of final roster cuts.

=== Buffalo Bills ===
On September 19, 2016, Poehls was signed to the Bills' practice squad. He was released by the Bills on October 27, 2016.

=== Chicago Bears ===
On November 2, 2016, Poehls was signed to the Bears' practice squad. He signed a reserve/future contract with the Bears on January 3, 2017. He was waived on September 2, 2017.

=== Jacksonville Jaguars ===
On September 3, 2017, Poehls was claimed off waivers by the Jacksonville Jaguars.

On September 1, 2018, Poehls was waived by the Jaguars.

=== Indianapolis Colts ===
On December 31, 2018, Poehls signed a reserve/future contract with the Indianapolis Colts. He was waived on July 30, 2019.

=== Tampa Bay Buccaneers ===
On July 31, 2019, Poehls was claimed off waivers by the Tampa Bay Buccaneers. He was waived during final roster cuts on August 30, 2019.
