= Brandon Harris =

American gridiron football player and coach (born 1990)

Current position
- Title: Cornerbacks coach
- Team: Florida
- Conference: SEC

Biographical details
- Born: January 24, 1990 (age 36); Miami, Florida, U.S.
- Height: 5 ft 10 in (178 cm)
- Education: University of Miami

Playing career
- 2008–2010: Miami (FL)
- 2011–2013: Houston Texans
- 2014–2015: Tennessee Titans
- 2016: Miami Dolphins (Note: Offseason and/or practice squad member only)
- 2017: Toronto Argonauts
- Position: Cornerback

Coaching career (HC unless noted)
- 2019: FIU (GA)
- 2020: Florida State (DA)
- 2021: FIU (CB)
- 2022: Florida Atlantic (CB)
- 2023–2024: Florida Atlantic (co-DC/CB)
- 2024: Florida Atlantic (interim DC)
- 2025: UCF (DB)
- 2026–present: Florida (CB)

Accomplishments and honors

Awards
- As a player: Grey Cup champion (2017); Third-team All-American (2009); First-team All-ACC (2009); Second-team All-ACC (2010)

Brandon Harris (born January 24, 1990) is an American football coach and former cornerback who currently serves as the cornerbacks coach at the University of Florida. He previously played in the National Football League (NFL). Harris played college football for the Miami Hurricanes and was selected by the Houston Texans in the second round of the 2011 NFL draft. He was also a member of the NFL's Tennessee Titans and the Toronto Argonauts of the Canadian Football League (CFL).

== Early life ==
Harris attended Booker T. Washington High School. As a senior, he was the Florida Gatorade Player of the Year after he recorded 49 tackles, five sacks, four interceptions, and two touchdowns as a cornerback and 26 receptions for 501 yards and eight touchdowns as a wide receiver.

== College career ==
As a freshman in 2008, Harris started six of 13 games for the Hurricanes at cornerback, recording 30 tackles, an interception, and a sack. As a sophomore in 2009 Harris recorded 55 tackles, two interceptions, and a sack. He was a first-team All-ACC selection, and earned second-team All-American honors from SI.com, and third-team from the Associated Press. As a Junior in 2010, he was a second-team All-ACC selection after starting all 13 games, recording 44 tackles and an interception. He finished his career with 32 starts in 39 games, 129 tackles and three interceptions.

After his junior season, Harris announced that he would forgo his senior season and enter the 2011 NFL draft.

== Professional career ==
Pre-draft measurables
Height	Weight	Arm length	Hand span	Wingspan	40-yard dash	10-yard split	20-yard split	20-yard shuttle	Three-cone drill	Vertical jump	Broad jump	Bench press
5 ft 9 1/2 in (1.77 m)	191 lb (87 kg)	30 5/8 in (0.78 m)	8 1/2 in (0.22 m)	6 ft 2 1/4 in (1.89 m)	4.52 s	1.58 s	2.63 s	4.12 s	6.77 s	35.5 in (0.90 m)	9 ft 5 in (2.87 m)	13 reps
All values from NFL Combine

=== Houston Texans ===
Harris was selected 60th overall in the second round of the 2011 NFL draft by the Houston Texans. He recorded 48 tackles, 38 solo, and 10 pass deflections during his four seasons with Houston. On August 30, 2014, he was released prior to the start of the 2014 season.

=== Tennessee Titans ===
On August 31, 2014, the Tennessee Titans claimed Harris off waivers. He re-signed with the Titans on March 27, 2015.

=== Miami Dolphins ===
On July 31, 2016, the Miami Dolphins signed Harris. On August 27, Harris was released.

=== Toronto Argonauts ===
On May 11, 2017, Harris signed with the Toronto Argonauts of the Canadian Football League, and was a part of the Grey Cup winning team.

== Coaching career ==
=== Florida International ===
In February 2021, FIU hired Harris to be the assistant coach (cornerbacks).

=== Florida Atlantic ===
In January 2022, FAU hired Harris as to be cornerbacks coach. He helped build FAU's aggressive defense in his debut season, when the Owls tied for 12th nationally in defensive touchdowns and intercepted 12 passes.

New head coach Tom Herman retained Harris in 2023 and promoted him to co-defensive coordinator. That season, Jarron Morris earned all-conference accolades, leading the team in tackles for loss, pass breakups, interceptions, and forced fumbles. FAU also had the third-fewest penalties in the country (41), and scored two defensive touchdowns.

In 2024, FAU's defense recorded 11 interceptions and two defensive touchdowns. The Owls had at least one turnover in eight of its 12 games and was ranked among the top 40 teams in red zone defense. Their defense also held seven teams to 25 points or fewer that season, including against 2024 AAC Champion Army. True freshman defensive back CJ Heard was selected All-AAC selection and led the team in tackles (82).

In November 2024, Harris became interim defensive coordinator following the dismissal of Roc Bellantoni.

=== University of Central Florida ===
In 2025, Harris was hired as UCF's Defensive Backs coach.

=== University of Florida ===
In 2026, Harris was hired as UF's cornerbacks coach.
