= Mike Mularkey =

American football player and coach (born 1961)

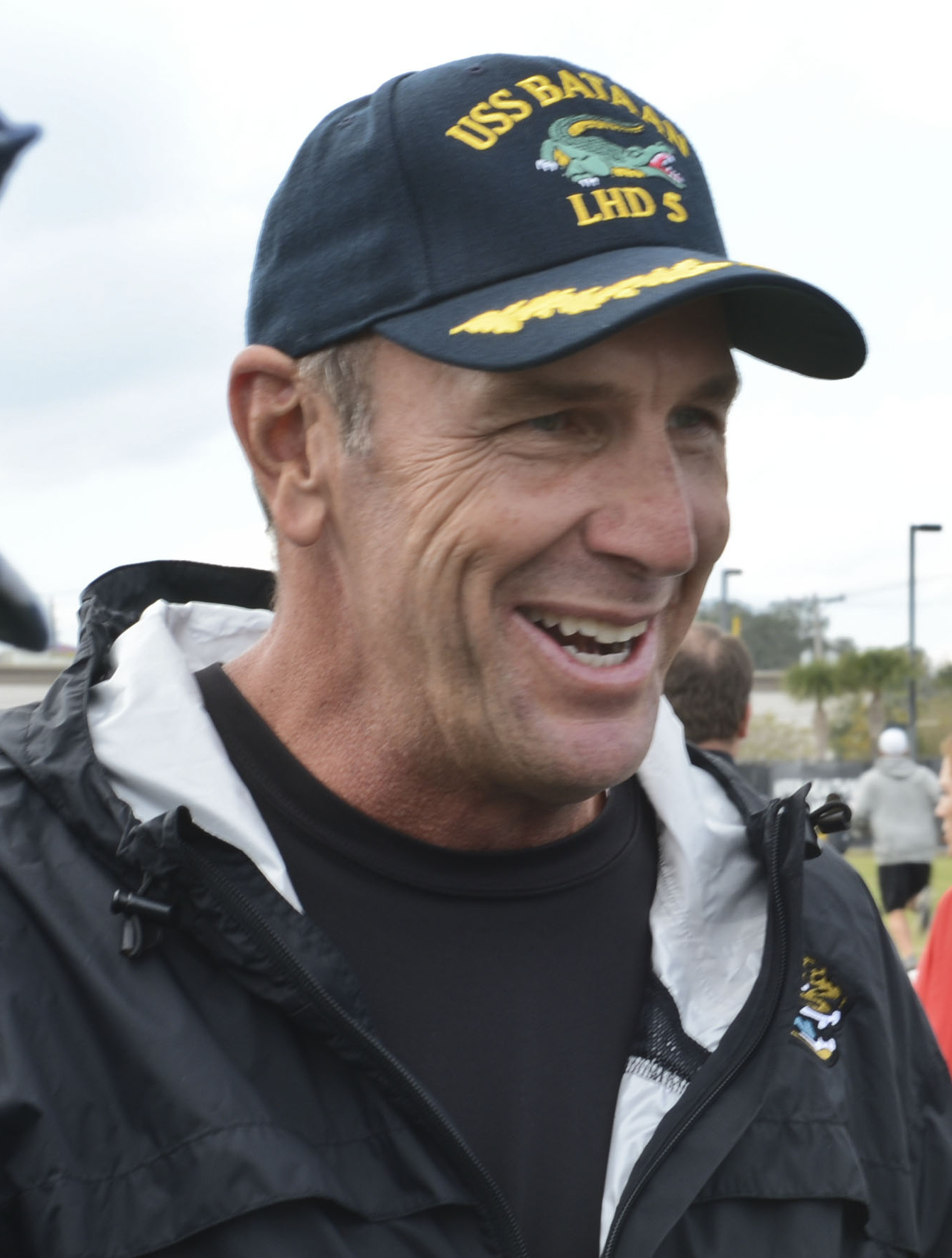
- Mularkey in 2012

No. 86, 84
- Position: Tight end

Personal information
- Born: November 19, 1961 (age 65); Fort Lauderdale, Florida, U.S.
- Listed height: 6 ft 4 in (1.93 m)
- Listed weight: 245 lb (111 kg)

Career information
- High school: Northeast (Oakland Park, Florida)
- College: Florida
- NFL draft: 1983: 9th round, 229th overall pick

Career history

Playing
- San Francisco 49ers (1983)*; Minnesota Vikings (1983–1988); Pittsburgh Steelers (1989–1991)
- * Offseason or practice squad member only

Coaching
- Concordia (MN) (1993) Offensive line coach; Tampa Bay Buccaneers (1994–1995) Tight ends coach; Pittsburgh Steelers (1996–2003); Tight ends coach (1996–2000); Offensive coordinator (2001–2003); Buffalo Bills (2004–2005) Head coach; Miami Dolphins (2006–2007); Offensive coordinator (2006); Tight ends coach (2007); Atlanta Falcons (2008–2011) Offensive coordinator; Jacksonville Jaguars (2012) Head coach; Tennessee Titans (2014–2017); Tight ends coach (2014–2015); Assistant head coach & interim head coach (2015); Head coach (2016–2017); Atlanta Falcons (2019) Tight ends coach

Awards and highlights
- Offensive Coordinator of the Year (2010); Assistant Coach of the Year (2001)

Career NFL statistics
- Receptions: 102
- Receiving yards: 1,222
- Receiving touchdowns: 9
- Stats at Pro Football Reference

Head coaching record
- Regular season: 36–53 (.404)
- Postseason: 1–1 (.500)
- Career: 37–54 (.407)
- Coaching profile at Pro Football Reference

Michael Rene Mularkey (born November 19, 1961) is an American former professional football coach and tight end in the National Football League (NFL). He played college football for the University of Florida, and was selected by the San Francisco 49ers in the ninth round of the 1983 NFL draft and lasted until the final round of cuts. Mularkey then signed with the Minnesota Vikings with whom he played for six seasons before playing another three with the Pittsburgh Steelers.

Mularkey has served as the head coach of the Buffalo Bills, Jacksonville Jaguars, and Tennessee Titans, the offensive coordinator for the Steelers, Miami Dolphins, and Atlanta Falcons, and the tight ends coach for the Dolphins, Titans, Tampa Bay Buccaneers, and Falcons.

== Early life ==
Mularkey was born in Ft. Lauderdale, Florida. He attended Northeast High School in Oakland Park, Florida, and played quarterback for the Northeast Hurricanes high school football team.

== College career ==
Mularkey attended the University of Florida in Gainesville, Florida, where he played tight end for coach Charley Pell's Florida Gators football team from 1980 to 1982. Mularkey finished his college career with 55 receptions for 628 yards and three touchdowns.

== Professional career ==
In 1983, Mularkey was a ninth-round draft pick for the San Francisco 49ers, but was released before appearing in a game. He went on to play with the Minnesota Vikings until the end of the 1988 season. In 1989, Mularkey signed with the Pittsburgh Steelers as a free agent for the final three years of his playing career. In his nine NFL seasons, Mularkey played in 114 regular-season games, started 46 of them, and caught 102 passes for 1,222 yards and nine touchdowns.

=== Career statistics ===
| | | | Receiving | | | |
| Year | Team | G | Rec | Yards | Y/R | TD |
|---|---|---|---|---|---|---|
| 1983 | MIN | 3 | 0 | 0 | 0 | 0 |
| 1984 | MIN | 16 | 14 | 134 | 9.6 | 2 |
| 1985 | MIN | 15 | 13 | 196 | 15.1 | 1 |
| 1986 | MIN | 16 | 11 | 89 | 8.1 | 2 |
| 1987 | MIN | 9 | 1 | 6 | 6.0 | 0 |
| 1988 | MIN | 16 | 3 | 39 | 13.0 | 0 |
| 1989 | PIT | 14 | 22 | 326 | 14.8 | 1 |
| 1990 | PIT | 16 | 32 | 365 | 11.4 | 3 |
| 1991 | PIT | 9 | 6 | 67 | 11.2 | 0 |
| Total | | 114 | 102 | 1,222 | 12.0 | 9 |

== Coaching career ==
=== Concordia University-St. Paul, Minnesota ===
Mularkey was given his first coaching position as an offensive/defensive line coach at Concordia University in St. Paul Minnesota for the 1993–94 season, working under head coach Tom Cross. Mularkey held the offensive/defensive lineman coaching position for one season.

=== Tampa Bay Buccaneers ===
Mularkey started his NFL coaching career in 1994 with the Tampa Bay Buccaneers as a quality control coach for both the offense and defense. In 1995, Mularkey was promoted to tight ends coach and held the position for one season.

=== Pittsburgh Steelers ===
Mularkey was hired as the Steelers' tight ends coach in 1996 and held the position until the end of the 2000 season, when he replaced Kevin Gilbride as the team's offensive coordinator. Mularkey has a reputation for being an offense-oriented head coach with a penchant for trick plays. His skill for creating special packages to utilize multi-dimensional players such as Hines Ward and Antwaan Randle El earned Mularkey the nickname "Inspector Gadget." For the 2001 season, Mularkey was named the Assistant Coach of the Year by Pro Football Writers of America.

=== Buffalo Bills ===
In 2004, Mularkey left the Steelers and was hired by the Buffalo Bills to succeed Gregg Williams as the team's head coach. Despite losing their first four games of the season, the Bills rallied to a 9–7 record by the end of the season which was sparked by a six-game winning streak, during which they scored more points than in any other similar stretch in franchise history. However, a loss to the Pittsburgh Steelers in the regular-season finale kept the Bills out of the playoffs. Overall, they were seventh in the league in total offense. This would be the Bills' last winning season until 2014.

Mularkey's second season in Buffalo was far less successful. Dogged by a quarterback controversy between J. P. Losman and Kelly Holcomb and a series of defensive personnel problems, Mularkey led the team to a 5–11 record and a sixth consecutive year out of the playoffs – the longest such active streak in the American Football Conference (AFC). Mularkey's offensive schemes continued to be touted by then-general manager Tom Donahoe, despite the lack of production, finishing 24th in total offense.

On January 12, 2006, Mularkey resigned as head coach of the Bills, citing a disagreement in the direction of the organization, who had recently hired new management, including ex-coach Marv Levy.

=== Miami Dolphins ===
On January 22, 2006, Mularkey was hired to be the Miami Dolphins' offensive coordinator. Under Miami's head coach, Nick Saban, Mularkey had an unsuccessful season with injuries to his first-string quarterback Daunte Culpepper and starting running back Ronnie Brown. The Dolphins only scored 16.3 points per game, ranking 29th in the NFL. Following the season, it was announced Saban had resigned as Dolphins head coach and he accepted the position of head coach of the Alabama Crimson Tide football team at the University of Alabama on January 3, 2007.

Upon the hiring of former San Diego Chargers offensive coordinator Cam Cameron as Dolphins head coach on January 19, 2007, it was announced that Mularkey would no longer serve as offensive coordinator but would remain with the team in another capacity. On March 15, it was officially announced that Cameron himself would call the offensive plays in 2007, leaving Mularkey to serve as tight ends coach.

=== Atlanta Falcons (first stint) ===
On January 25, 2008, it was announced that Mularkey would become the next offensive coordinator for the Atlanta Falcons.

In Mularkey's first season in Atlanta, the Falcons finished with an 11–5 record and the offense rushed for 152.5 rushing yards per game, second most in the league. They also finished 10th in the NFL in scoring (up from 29th the previous year) with 24.4 points per game, and sixth in yards with 361.2 per game.

Following a 13–3 season in 2010, Mularkey was named the Offensive Coordinator of the Year by Sporting News. He interviewed with multiple NFL teams for their head coaching vacancies for 2011.

=== Jacksonville Jaguars ===
On January 11, 2012, Mularkey accepted the head coaching job for the Jacksonville Jaguars, making him the third full-time head coach in franchise history. His first win came in Week 3 against the Indianapolis Colts.

Mularkey led the Jaguars to a 2–14 record, which was the worst in franchise history up to that point, and he was fired after only one season on January 10, 2013. Mularkey had two years remaining on a three-year contract. However, general manager David Caldwell, who had been hired two days prior, decided that the team needed "an immediate and clean restart" after winning only seven games in the past two seasons.

=== Tennessee Titans ===
On January 22, 2014, the Tennessee Titans announced that they had hired Mularkey as their tight ends coach. He was given the title of assistant head coach the following season.

On November 3, 2015, the Titans fired head coach Ken Whisenhunt and announced that Mularkey would step in as interim head coach for the rest of the season. He had a 2–7 record as interim head coach as the Titans finished with a league-worst 3–13 record.

On January 16, 2016, the Titans announced that they would retain Mularkey as their full-time head coach on a three-year contract, a move that was highly criticized by their fans and the media, who characterized the hire as "uninspired" and "awful". Mularkey was given full control over his staff, and two days later, Mularkey hired former Atlanta Falcons wide receivers coach Terry Robiskie as offensive coordinator while promoting assistant defensive coordinator Dick LeBeau to defensive coordinator. Mularkey stated that the Titans would run an "exotic smashmouth" offense in 2016, meaning that they would go run-heavy, like a 1970s offense.

After starting the season 1–3, the Titans beat the Cleveland Browns and Miami Dolphins to improve to 3–3. Thanks to a last-minute narrow Week 2 16–15 road victory over the Detroit Lions, a Week 10 47–25 blowout victory over the Green Bay Packers, and a game-winning 53-yard field goal to narrowly beat the Kansas City Chiefs on the road 19–17 in Week 15, the team came within just one game of earning an AFC South division title and a trip to the playoffs, ending with a 9–7 record, their first winning season since 2011. The Titans also sent five players to the Pro Bowl, their highest number since 2008.

In 2017, the Titans again finished with a 9–7 record, making the playoffs for the first time in nine years with a 15–10 victory over the Jacksonville Jaguars in the regular-season finale. The Titans sent six players to the Pro Bowl. In the Wild Card Round, the Titans rallied from a 21–3 halftime deficit against the Kansas City Chiefs to narrowly win on the road by a score of 22–21; this was their first playoff victory since 2003. After the Titans' 35–14 road loss to the New England Patriots in the Divisional Round the following week, Mularkey and the Titans agreed to part ways on January 15, 2018.

=== Atlanta Falcons (second stint) ===
After a year away from coaching, Mularkey was hired to be the Falcons' tight end coach on January 8, 2019.

=== Retirement ===
On January 9, 2020, Mularkey announced his retirement from coaching.

== Head coaching record ==
| Team | Year | Regular season | | | | | Postseason | | | |
| Team | Year | Won | Lost | Ties | Win % | Finish | Won | Lost | Win % | Result |
|---|---|---|---|---|---|---|---|---|---|---|
| BUF | 2004 | 9 | 7 | 0 | .563 | 3rd in AFC East | — | — | — | — |
| BUF | 2005 | 5 | 11 | 0 | .313 | 3rd in AFC East | — | — | — | — |
| BUF total | | 14 | 18 | 0 | .438 | | 0 | 0 | .000 | |
| JAX | 2012 | 2 | 14 | 0 | .125 | 4th in AFC South | — | — | — | — |
| JAX total | | 2 | 14 | 0 | .125 | | 0 | 0 | .000 | |
| TEN* | 2015 | 2 | 7 | 0 | .222 | 4th in AFC South | — | — | — | — |
| TEN | 2016 | 9 | 7 | 0 | .563 | 2nd in AFC South | — | — | — | — |
| TEN | 2017 | 9 | 7 | 0 | .563 | 2nd in AFC South | 1 | 1 | .500 | Lost to New England Patriots in AFC Divisional Game |
| TEN total | | 20 | 21 | 0 | .488 | | 1 | 1 | .500 | |
| Total | | 36 | 53 | 0 | .404 | | 1 | 1 | .500 | |

* – Interim head coach

== Personal life ==
Mularkey is married to Elizabeth "Betsy" Conant Mularkey, who is also a University of Florida graduate. They have two sons, Patrick and Shane. Shane was a scholarship football player at University of North Carolina, but ended his playing days after shoulder surgery.

== See also ==
- Florida Gators football, 1980–89
- List of Buffalo Bills head coaches
- List of Florida Gators in the NFL draft
- List of Pittsburgh Steelers players
