= 2013 Tennessee Titans season =

54th season in franchise history; final one with Bud Adams

- Owner: Bud Adams (until death); KSA Industries (after October 21)
- General manager: Ruston Webster
- Head coach: Mike Munchak
- Home stadium: LP Field

Results
- Record: 7–9
- Division place: 2nd AFC South
- Playoffs: Did not qualify
- Pro Bowlers: CB Alterraun Verner

Uniform
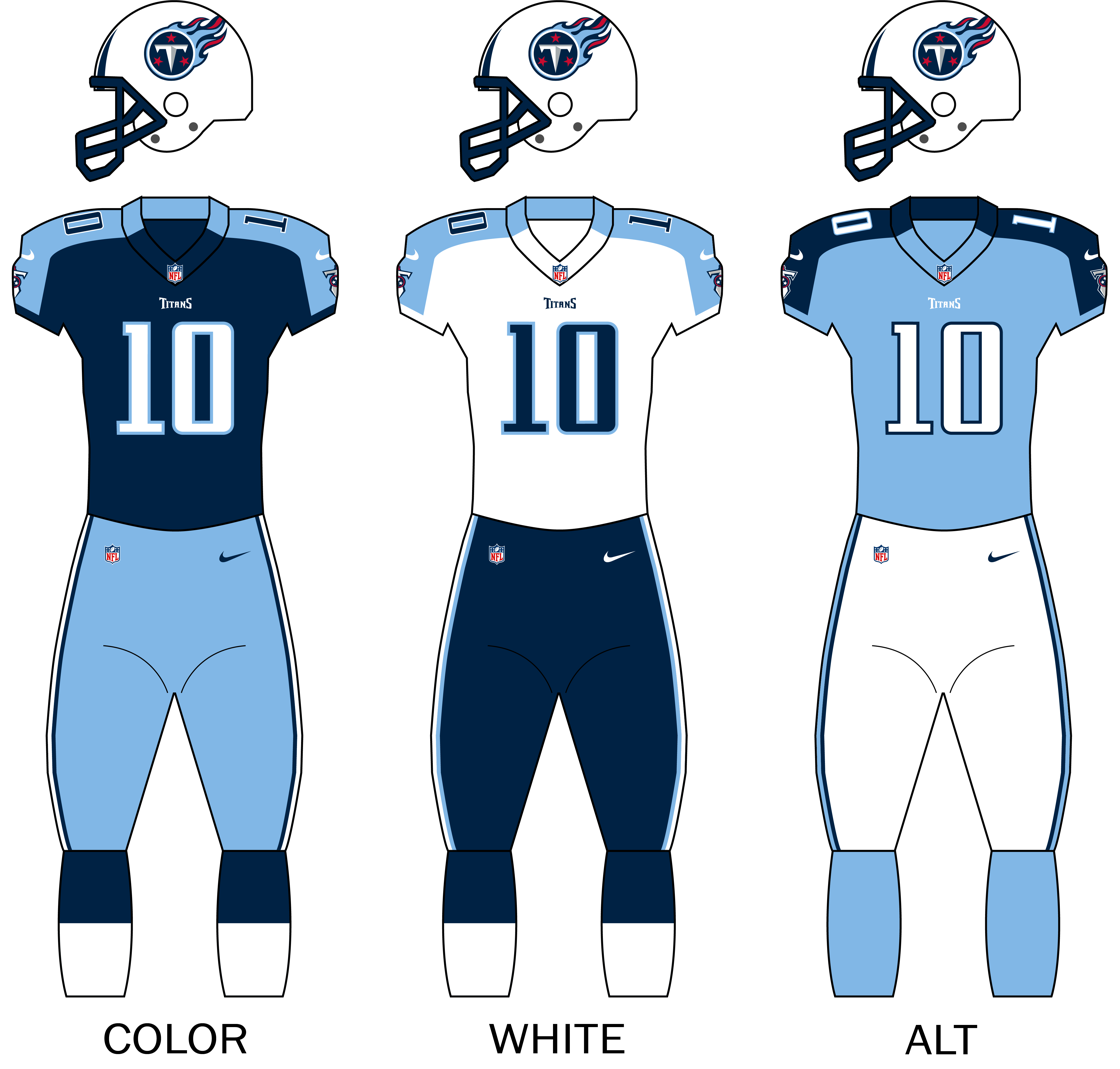

The 2013 season was the Tennessee Titans' 44th in the National Football League (NFL), their 54th overall, their 17th in the state of Tennessee, and their third and final season under head coach Mike Munchak. It was also their final season under the ownership of founder Bud Adams, who died on October 21. The Titans slightly improved on their 6–10 record from 2012 but missed the playoffs for a fifth consecutive season.

== 2013 draft class ==
2013 Tennessee Titans Draft
Round	Selection	Player	Position	College
1	10	Chance Warmack	Guard	Alabama
2	34^{[a]}	Justin Hunter	Wide receiver	Tennessee
3	70	Blidi Wreh-Wilson	Cornerback	UConn
3	97^{[c]}	Zaviar Gooden	Linebacker	Missouri
4	107	Brian Schwenke	Center	California
5	142	Lavar Edwards	Defensive end	LSU
6^{[b]}	202^{[c]}	Khalid Wooten	Cornerback	Nevada
7^{[a]}	248^{[c]}	Daimion Stafford	Safety	Nebraska

Notes

^{^[a]} The Titans traded their original second- (No. 40 overall) and seventh- (No. 216 overall) round selections, along with their 2014 third-round selection to the San Francisco 49ers in exchange for the 49ers' second-round selection (No. 34 overall).
^{^[b]} The Titans traded their original sixth-round selection (No. 176 overall) to the Minnesota Vikings in exchange for the Vikings' 2012 seventh-round selection.
^{^[c]} Compensatory selection.

== Staff ==
2013 Tennessee Titans staff
Front office: Owner – Estate of Bud Adams; Executive vice president/general manager – Ruston Webster; Vice president of player personnel – Lake Dawson; Vice president of football administration – Vin Marino; Director of college scouting – Blake Beddingfield; Head coaches: Head coach – Mike Munchak; Offensive coaches: Offensive coordinator – Dowell Loggains; Quarterbacks – Dave Ragone; Running backs – Sylvester Croom; Wide receivers – Shawn Jefferson; Tight ends – George Henshaw; Offensive line – Bruce Matthews; Assistant offensive line/tight ends – Arthur Smith	Defensive coaches: Defensive coordinator – Jerry Gray; Defensive line – Tracy Rocker; Linebackers – Chet Parlavecchio; Secondary – Brett Maxie; Assistant secondary – Steve Brown; Senior defensive assistant – Gregg Williams; Defensive assistant/pass rush specialist – Keith Millard; Defensive assistant/quality control – Jonathan Gannon; Special teams coaches: Special teams – Nate Kaczor; Assistant special teams – Steve Hoffman; Strength and conditioning: Assistant head coach/strength and conditioning – Steve Watterson

== Final roster ==
2013 Tennessee Titans roster
Quarterbacks (QB): 4 Ryan Fitzpatrick; 11 Rusty Smith; 8 Tyler Wilson; Running backs (RB): 22 Jackie Battle; 23 Shonn Greene; 28 Chris Johnson; 45 Quinn Johnson; 26 Leon Washington; Wide receivers (WR): 18 Kenny Britt; 15 Justin Hunter; 14 Michael Preston; 85 Nate Washington; 17 Damian Williams; 13 Kendall Wright; Tight ends (TE): 88 Craig Stevens; 84 Taylor Thompson; 82 Delanie Walker	Offensive linemen (OL): 67 Andy Levitre G; 61 Kevin Matthews C; 66 Mike Otto T; 71 Michael Roos T; 62 Brian Schwenke C; 60 Chris Spencer G/C; 76 David Stewart T; 68 Byron Stingily T; 70 Chance Warmack G; Defensive linemen (DL): 99 Jurrell Casey DT; 98 Lavar Edwards DE; 94 Sammie Lee Hill DT; 90 Antonio Johnson DT; 97 Karl Klug DE; 93 Mike Martin DT; 91 Derrick Morgan DE; 92 Ropati Pitoitua DE; 95 Kamerion Wimbley DE	Linebackers (LB): 56 Akeem Ayers OLB; 57 Patrick Bailey OLB; 55 Zach Brown OLB; 53 Moise Fokou MLB; 50 Zaviar Gooden OLB; 52 Colin McCarthy MLB; Defensive backs (DB): 33 Michael Griffin FS; 30 Jason McCourty CB; 32 Micah Pellerin CB; 31 Bernard Pollard SS; 39 Daimion Stafford SS; 20 Alterraun Verner CB; 21 George Wilson FS; 29 Blidi Wreh-Wilson CB; 36 Khalid Wooten CB; Special teams (ST): 2 Rob Bironas K; 48 Beau Brinkley LS; 6 Brett Kern P	Practice squad: 77 Jeff Adams T; 78 Chigbo Anunoby DT (PS/I); 40 George Baker CB; 51 Brandon Copeland LB; 69 Tyler Horn C; 75 Adewale Ojomo DE; 86 Adam Schiltz TE; 79 Kurt Taufa'asau DT; 49 Jonathan Willard LB; Reserve: 37 Tommie Campbell CB (IR); 10 Jake Locker QB (IR); 83 Marc Mariani WR (IR); 42 Collin Mooney FB (IR); 24 Coty Sensabaugh CB (IR); 59 Rob Turner C (IR); 87 Kevin Walter WR (PUP); Rookies in italics 53 active, 8 reserve, 8 practice squad

=== Team captains ===
- Jake Locker (QB)
- Nate Washington (WR)
- Michael Roos (OT)
- Jason McCourty (CB)
- Bernard Pollard (SS)
- Patrick Bailey (ST)

== Schedule ==
=== Preseason ===
Week	Date	Opponent	Result	Record	Venue	Recap
1	August 8	Washington Redskins	**L** 21–22	0–1	LP Field	Recap
2	August 17	at Cincinnati Bengals	**L** 19–27	0–2	Paul Brown Stadium	Recap
3	August 24	Atlanta Falcons	**W** 27–16	1–2	LP Field	Recap
4	August 29	at Minnesota Vikings	**L** 23–24	1–3	Mall of America Field	Recap

=== Regular season ===
Week	Date	Opponent	Result	Record	Venue	Recap
1	September 8	at Pittsburgh Steelers	**W** 16–9	1–0	Heinz Field	Recap
2	September 15	at **Houston Texans**	**L** 24–30 (OT)	1–1	Reliant Stadium	Recap
3	September 22	San Diego Chargers	**W** 20–17	2–1	LP Field	Recap
4	September 29	New York Jets	**W** 38–13	3–1	LP Field	Recap
5	October 6	Kansas City Chiefs	**L** 17–26	3–2	LP Field	Recap
6	October 13	at Seattle Seahawks	**L** 13–20	3–3	CenturyLink Field	Recap
7	October 20	San Francisco 49ers	**L** 17–31	3–4	LP Field	Recap
8	Bye					
9	November 3	at St. Louis Rams	**W** 28–21	4–4	Edward Jones Dome	Recap
10	November 10	**Jacksonville Jaguars**	**L** 27–29	4–5	LP Field	Recap
11	November 14	**Indianapolis Colts**	**L** 27–30	4–6	LP Field	Recap
12	November 24	at Oakland Raiders	**W** 23–19	5–6	O.co Coliseum	Recap
13	December 1	at **Indianapolis Colts**	**L** 14–22	5–7	Lucas Oil Stadium	Recap
14	December 8	at Denver Broncos	**L** 28–51	5–8	Sports Authority Field at Mile High	Recap
15	December 15	Arizona Cardinals	**L** 34–37 (OT)	5–9	LP Field	Recap
16	December 22	at **Jacksonville Jaguars**	**W** 20–16	6–9	EverBank Field	Recap
17	December 29	**Houston Texans**	**W** 16–10	7–9	LP Field	Recap

Note: Intra-division opponents are in bold text.

=== Game summaries ===
==== Week 1: at Pittsburgh Steelers ====
Week One: Tennessee Titans at Pittsburgh Steelers – Game summary

Quarter	1	2	3	4	Total
**Titans**	0	7	3	6	**16**
Steelers	2	0	0	7	**9**

at Heinz Field, Pittsburgh, Pennsylvania

- Date: September 8
- Game time: 1:00 p.m. EDT/12:00 p.m. CDT
- Game weather: 73 °F (23 °C), cloudy
- Game attendance: 61,585
- Referee: Jerome Boger
- TV announcers (CBS): Ian Eagle and Dan Fouts
- Recap, Game book

Game information

**First quarter**

**Second quarter**

**Third quarter**

**Fourth quarter**

**Top passers**

- TEN –
- PIT –

**Top rushers**

- TEN –
- PIT –

**Top receivers**

- TEN –
- PIT –

**Top tacklers**

- TEN –
- PIT –

The Titans traveled to Pittsburgh for their season opener against the rival Steelers. The first play of their season was a mental error by kick returner Darius Reynaud, who tried to kneel down for a touchback, but fielded the ball just outside the end zone, which resulted in a safety for Pittsburgh. Notwithstanding, Tennessee got off to a strong start, scoring a touchdown and 3 field goals for a 16-2 lead. In the fourth quarter, the Steelers cut the Titans' lead to 16-9 after they scored a touchdown. However, Tennessee ran out the clock, ensuring themselves a victory. With the convincing win, the Titans started the season at 1-0, but since the Colts beat the Raiders, 21-17, and the Texans later defeated the Chargers, 31-28, Tennessee tied for 1st place in the AFC South, since the Jacksonville Jaguars were humiliated, 28-2, at home by the Kansas City Chiefs.

==== Week 2: at Houston Texans ====
Week Two: Tennessee Titans at Houston Texans – Game summary

Quarter	1	2	3	4	OT	Total
Titans	7	3	0	14	0	**24**
**Texans**	7	0	7	10	6	**30**

at Reliant Stadium, Houston, Texas

- Date: September 15
- Game time: 12:00 p.m. CDT
- Game weather: Played indoors (retractable roof closed)
- Game attendance: 71,718
- Referee: Jeff Triplette
- TV announcers (CBS): Kevin Harlan and Solomon Wilcots
- Recap, Game book

Game information

**First quarter**

**Second quarter**

**Third quarter**

**Fourth quarter**

**Top passers**

- TEN –
- HOU –

**Top rushers**

- TEN –
- HOU –

**Top receivers**

- TEN –
- HOU –

**Top tacklers**

- TEN –
- HOU –

==== Week 3: vs. San Diego Chargers ====
Week Three: San Diego Chargers at Tennessee Titans – Game summary

Quarter	1	2	3	4	Total
Chargers	7	3	7	0	**17**
**Titans**	0	10	0	10	**20**

at LP Field, Nashville, Tennessee

- Date: September 22
- Game time: 12:00 p.m. CDT
- Game weather: 75 °F (24 °C), (Sunny)
- Game attendance: 69,143
- Referee: Tony Corrente
- TV announcers (CBS): Ian Eagle and Dan Fouts
- Recap, Game book

Game information

**First quarter**

**Second quarter**

**Third quarter**

**Fourth quarter**

**Top passers**

- SD –
- TEN –

**Top rushers**

- SD –
- TEN –

**Top receivers**

- SD –
- TEN –

**Top tacklers**

- SD –
- TEN –

For the first time since 1992 the Titans franchise defeated the Chargers, winning on a 34-yard touchdown throw from Jake Locker to Justin Hunter with 15 seconds to go. Locker finished with 367 all-purpose yards – 299 passing yards, 68 rushing yards. Chris Johnson finished with 90 rushing yards.

==== Week 4: vs. New York Jets ====
Week Four: New York Jets at Tennessee Titans – Game summary

Quarter	1	2	3	4	Total
Jets	0	6	0	7	**13**
**Titans**	10	14	0	14	**38**

at LP Field, Nashville, Tennessee

- Date: September 29
- Game time: 3:05 p.m. CDT
- Game weather: 74 °F (23 °C), cloudy
- Game attendance: 69,143
- Referee: Walt Anderson
- TV announcers (CBS): Greg Gumbel and Dan Dierdorf
- Recap, Game book

Game information

**First quarter** – Titans 10–0 **Second quarter** – Titans 24–6 **Third quarter** – Titans 24–6 **Fourth quarter** – Titans 38–13

**Top passers**

- NYJ – Geno Smith 23–34–289–1–2
- TEN – Jake Locker 18–24–189–3–0

**Top rushers**

- NYJ – Bilal Powell 14–66–0
- TEN – Jackie Battle 11–42–0

**Top receivers**

- NYJ – Jeremy Kerley 4–65–0
- TEN – Nate Washington 4–105–2

**Top tacklers**

- NYJ –
- TEN –

The Titans forced four Jets turnovers; Jake Locker threw three touchdowns off turnovers as the Titans led 24–6 at the half. Locker was knocked out of the game in the third quarter following hits from Muhammad Wilkerson and Quinton Coples, suffering a right hip injury; a subsequent MRI showed no major damage to Locker's hip and he was sidelined for the next two games. Ryan Fitzpatrick finished the game, throwing a 77-yard score to Nate Washington. Geno Smith of the Jets was intercepted twice, but the most-popularized play came when he fumbled behind his back at the Titans goalline and Karl Klug fell on the touchdown. Tennessee won 38–13.

==== Week 5: vs. Kansas City Chiefs ====
Week Five: Kansas City Chiefs at Tennessee Titans – Game summary

Quarter	1	2	3	4	Total
**Chiefs**	7	6	0	13	**26**
Titans	0	0	10	7	**17**

at LP Field, Nashville, Tennessee

- Date: October 6
- Game time: 12:00 p.m. CDT
- Game weather: 66 °F (19 °C), (Rain)
- Game attendance: 69,143
- Referee: Bill Vinovich
- TV announcers (CBS): Kevin Harlan and Solomon Wilcots
- Recap, Game book

Game information

**First quarter**

**Second quarter**

**Third quarter**

**Fourth quarter**

**Top passers**

- KC –
- TEN –

**Top rushers**

- KC –
- TEN –

**Top receivers**

- KC –
- TEN –

**Top tacklers**

- KC –
- TEN –

==== Week 6: at Seattle Seahawks ====
Week Six: Tennessee Titans at Seattle Seahawks – Game summary

Quarter	1	2	3	4	Total
Titans	3	7	0	3	**13**
**Seahawks**	0	7	3	10	**20**

at CenturyLink Field, Seattle, Washington

- Date: October 13
- Game time: 3:05 p.m. CDT/1:05 p.m. PDT
- Game weather: 51 °F (11 °C), sunny
- Game attendance: 68,127
- Referee: Carl Cheffers
- TV announcers (CBS): Greg Gumbel and Dan Dierdorf
- Recap, Game book

Game information

**First quarter**

**Second quarter**

**Third quarter**

**Fourth quarter**

**Top passers**

- TEN –
- SEA –

**Top rushers**

- TEN –
- SEA –

**Top receivers**

- TEN –
- SEA –

**Top tacklers**

- TEN –
- SEA –

==== Week 7: vs. San Francisco 49ers ====
Week Seven: San Francisco 49ers at Tennessee Titans – Game summary

Quarter	1	2	3	4	Total
**49ers**	3	14	7	7	**31**
Titans	0	0	0	17	**17**

at LP Field, Nashville, Tennessee

- Date: October 20
- Game time: 3:05 p.m. CDT
- Game weather: 63 °F (17 °C), (Sunny)
- Game attendance: 69,143
- Referee: Ron Winter
- TV announcers (Fox): Chris Myers, Tim Ryan and Jennifer Hale
- Recap, Game book

Game information

**First quarter**

**Second quarter**

**Third quarter**

**Fourth quarter**

**Top passers**

- SF –
- TEN –

**Top rushers**

- SF –
- TEN –

**Top receivers**

- SF –
- TEN –

**Top tacklers**

- SF –
- TEN –

==== Week 9: at St. Louis Rams ====
Week Nine: Tennessee Titans at St. Louis Rams – Game summary

Quarter	1	2	3	4	Total
**Titans**	7	0	7	14	**28**
Rams	0	7	7	7	**21**

at Edward Jones Dome, St. Louis, Missouri

- Date: November 3
- Game time: 12:00 p.m. CST
- Game weather: Played indoors (dome stadium)
- Game attendance: 54,617
- Referee: Pete Morelli
- TV announcers (CBS): Marv Albert and Rich Gannon
- Recap, Game book

Game information

**First quarter**

**Second quarter**

**Third quarter**

**Fourth quarter**

**Top passers**

- TEN –
- STL –

**Top rushers**

- TEN –
- STL –

**Top receivers**

- TEN –
- STL –

**Top tacklers**

- TEN –
- STL –

The game was the first meeting between the Titans and their former coach, Jeff Fisher, and the first game for the club since the passing of its founder, Bud Adams. For the first time in 7 years, it was also quarterback Ryan Fitzpatrick's first return to St. Louis since he was traded from the Rams following the 2006 season. Fitzpatrick played his first 2 seasons in and was drafted 250th overall by St. Louis in 2005. The game lead tied or changed on every score as the Titans erupted to 198 rushing yards and four touchdowns on the ground. Chris Johnson scored twice amid 170 all-purpose yards (150 on the ground) while Jake Locker overcame two interceptions to throw for 185 yards and run in a six-yard score.

==== Week 10: vs. Jacksonville Jaguars ====
Week Ten: Jacksonville Jaguars at Tennessee Titans – Game summary

Quarter	1	2	3	4	Total
**Jaguars**	10	3	7	9	**29**
Titans	0	7	3	17	**27**

at LP Field, Nashville, Tennessee

- Date: November 10
- Game time: 12:00 p.m. CST
- Game weather: 65 °F (18 °C), (Sunny)
- Game attendance: 69,143
- Referee: John Parry
- TV announcers (CBS): Bill Macatee and Steve Tasker
- Recap, Game Book

Game information

**First quarter**

- JAC – Maurice Jones-Drew 6-yard run (Josh Scobee kick), 13:29. Jaguars 7–0. **Drive: 3 plays, 19 yards, 1:15.**
- JAC – Josh Scobee 32-yard field goal, 6:31. Jaguars 10–0. **Drive: 8 plays, 50 yards, 3:20.**

**Second quarter**

- JAC – Josh Scobee 44-yard field goal, 10:47. Jaguars 13–0. **Drive: 7 plays, 19 yards, 3:18.**
- TEN – Taylor Thompson 9-yard pass from Ryan Fitzpatrick (Rob Bironas kick), 0:41. Jaguars 13–7. **Drive: 8 plays, 52 yards, 3:44.**

**Third quarter**

- JAC – Jordan Todman 5-yard run (Josh Scobee kick), 10:17. Jaguars 20–7. **Drive: 8 plays, 79 yards, 4:43.**
- TEN – Rob Bironas 39-yard field goal, 5:15. Jaguars 20–10. **Drive: 11 plays, 59 yards, 5:02.**

**Fourth quarter**

- TEN – Rob Bironas 37-yard field goal, 12:50. Jaguars 20–13. **Drive: 4 plays, 7 yards, 1:24.**
- JAC – Penalty on Chance Warmack enforced in end zone for a safety, 7:44. Jaguars 22–13.
- TEN – Ryan Fitzpatrick 4-yard run (Rob Bironas kick), 4:15. Jaguars 22–20. **Drive: 5 plays, 72 yards, 1:43.**
- JAC – Will Blackmon 21-yard fumble return (Josh Scobee kick), 2:32. Jaguars 29–20.
- TEN – Delanie Walker 14-yard pass from Ryan Fitzpatrick (Rob Bironas kick), 0:40. Jaguars 29–27. **Drive: 12 plays, 82 yards, 1:52.**

**Top passers**

- JAC – Chad Henne – 14/23, 180 yards, 2 INT
- TEN – Ryan Fitzpatrick – 22/33, 264 yards, 2 TD

**Top rushers**

- JAC – Maurice Jones-Drew – 21 rushes, 41 yards, TD
- TEN – Chris Johnson – 12 rushes, 30 yards

**Top receivers**

- JAC – Cecil Shorts – 2 receptions, 42 yards
- TEN – Kendall Wright – 7 receptions, 78 yards

**Top tacklers**

- JAC – Geno Hayes – 9 tackles, 2 assists, 1 pass defended, 1 forced fumble
- TEN – Colin McCarthy – 4 tackles, 3 assists, 1 interception, 1 pass defended, 1 forced fumble

==== Week 11: vs. Indianapolis Colts ====
Week Eleven: Indianapolis Colts at Tennessee Titans – Game summary

Quarter	1	2	3	4	Total
**Colts**	0	6	17	7	**30**
Titans	14	3	0	10	**27**

at LP Field, Nashville, Tennessee

- Date: November 14
- Game time: 7:25 p.m. CST
- Game weather: 38 °F (3 °C), (Clear)
- Game attendance: 69,143
- Referee: Mike Carey
- TV announcers (NFLN): Brad Nessler, Mike Mayock and Alex Flanagan
- Recap, Game book

Game information

**First quarter**

**Second quarter**

**Third quarter**

**Fourth quarter**

**Top passers**

- IND –
- TEN –

**Top rushers**

- IND –
- TEN –

**Top receivers**

- IND –
- TEN –

**Top tacklers**

- IND –
- TEN –

==== Week 12: at Oakland Raiders ====
Week Twelve: Tennessee Titans at Oakland Raiders – Game summary

Quarter	1	2	3	4	Total
**Titans**	3	3	7	10	**23**
Raiders	3	6	3	7	**19**

at O.co Coliseum, Oakland, California

- Date: November 24
- Game time: 3:05 p.m. CST/1:05 p.m. PST
- Game weather: 58 °F (14 °C), sunny
- Game attendance: 46,001
- Referee: Carl Cheffers
- TV announcers (CBS): Marv Albert and Rich Gannon
- Recap, Game book

Game information

**First quarter**

**Second quarter**

**Third quarter**

**Fourth quarter**

**Top passers**

- TEN –
- OAK –

**Top rushers**

- TEN –
- OAK –

**Top receivers**

- TEN –
- OAK –

**Top tacklers**

- TEN –
- OAK –

==== Week 13: at Indianapolis Colts ====
Week Thirteen: Tennessee Titans at Indianapolis Colts – Game summary

Quarter	1	2	3	4	Total
Titans	0	7	7	0	**14**
**Colts**	6	6	3	7	**22**

at Lucas Oil Stadium, Indianapolis, Indiana

- Date: December 1
- Game time: 1:00 p.m. EST/12:00 p.m. CST
- Game weather: Played indoors (retractable roof closed)
- Game attendance: 65,502
- Referee: Walt Coleman
- TV announcers (CBS): Bill Macatee, Steve Beuerlein and Steve Tasker
- Recap, Game book

Game information

**First quarter**

**Second quarter**

**Third quarter**

**Fourth quarter**

**Top passers**

- TEN –
- IND –

**Top rushers**

- TEN –
- IND –

**Top receivers**

- TEN –
- IND –

**Top tacklers**

- TEN –
- IND –

==== Week 14: at Denver Broncos ====
Week Fourteen: Tennessee Titans at Denver Broncos – Game summary

Quarter	1	2	3	4	Total
Titans	14	7	7	0	**28**
**Broncos**	10	10	14	17	**51**

at Sports Authority Field at Mile High, Denver, Colorado

- Date: December 8
- Game time: 3:05 p.m. CST/2:05 p.m. MST
- Game weather: 18 °F (−8 °C), mostly sunny
- Game attendance: 76,554
- Referee: Scott Green
- TV announcers (CBS): Jim Nantz and Phil Simms
- Recap, Game book

Game information

**First quarter**

**Second quarter**

**Third quarter**

**Fourth quarter**

**Top passers**

- TEN –
- DEN –

**Top rushers**

- TEN –
- DEN –

**Top receivers**

- TEN –
- DEN –

**Top tacklers**

- TEN –
- DEN –

==== Week 15: vs. Arizona Cardinals ====
Week Fifteen: Arizona Cardinals at Tennessee Titans – Game summary

Quarter	1	2	3	4	OT	Total
**Cardinals**	7	3	10	14	3	**37**
Titans	10	0	7	17	0	**34**

at LP Field, Nashville, Tennessee

- Date: December 15
- Game time: 3:25 p.m. CST
- Game weather: 36 °F (2 °C), (Cloudy)
- Game attendance: 69,143
- Referee: Pete Morelli
- TV announcers (Fox): Justin Kutcher, Charles Davis and Kristina Pink
- Recap, Game book

Game information

**First quarter**

**Second quarter**

**Third quarter**

**Fourth quarter**

**Top passers**

- ARI –
- TEN –

**Top rushers**

- ARI –
- TEN –

**Top receivers**

- ARI –
- TEN –

**Top tacklers**

- ARI –
- TEN –

With the loss, coupled with the Miami Dolphins' win, the Titans were officially eliminated from playoff contention.

==== Week 16: at Jacksonville Jaguars ====
Week Sixteen: Tennessee Titans at Jacksonville Jaguars – Game summary

Quarter	1	2	3	4	Total
**Titans**	3	3	7	7	**20**
Jaguars	7	6	3	0	**16**

at EverBank Field, Jacksonville, Florida

- Date: December 22
- Game time: 1:00 p.m. EST/12:00 p.m. CST
- Game weather: 79 °F (26 °C), no chance of rain
- Game attendance: 60,559
- Referee: Bill Vinovich
- TV announcers (CBS): Andrew Catalon and Adam Archuleta
- Recap, Game Book

Game information

**First quarter**

- TEN – Rob Bironas 45-yard field goal, 9:05. Titans 3–0. **Drive: 7 plays, 64 yards, 3:46.**
- JAC – Marcedes Lewis 4-yard pass from Chad Henne (Josh Scobee kick), 4:45. Jaguars 7–3. **Drive: 9 plays, 80 yards, 4:20.**

**Second quarter**

- TEN – Rob Bironas 52-yard field goal, 1:55. Jaguars 7–6. **Drive: 11 plays, 32 yards, 5:11.**
- JAC – Mike Brown 7-yard pass from Chad Henne (kick failed), 0:43. Jaguars 13–6. **Drive: 7 plays, 60 yards, 1:12.**

**Third quarter**

- JAC – Josh Scobee 36-yard field goal, 9:22. Jaguars 16–6. **Drive: 8 plays, 17 yards, 4:25.**
- TEN – Shonn Greene 1-yard run (Rob Bironas kick), 4:01. Jaguars 16–13. **Drive: 11 plays, 80 yards, 5:21.**

**Fourth quarter**

- TEN – Nate Washington 30-yard pass from Ryan Fitzpatrick (Rob Bironas kick), 14:25. Titans 20–16. **Drive: 9 plays,73 yards, 3:47.**

**Top passers**

- TEN – Ryan Fitzpatrick – 17/26, 181 yards, TD, INT
- JAC – Chad Henne – 24/34, 237 yards, 2 TD, INT

**Top rushers**

- TEN – Shonn Greene – 19 rushes, 91 yards, TD
- JAC – Maurice Jones-Drew – 13 rushes, 45 yards

**Top receivers**

- TEN – Nate Washington – 6 receptions, 117 yards, TD
- JAC – Mike Brown – 5 receptions, 71 yards, TD

**Top tacklers**

- TEN – Moise Fokou – 6 tackles
- JAC – Paul Posluszny – 10 tackles, 3 assists, 0.5 sack

==== Week 17: vs. Houston Texans ====
Week Seventeen: Houston Texans at Tennessee Titans – Game summary

Quarter	1	2	3	4	Total
Texans	7	0	0	3	**10**
**Titans**	0	6	7	3	**16**

at LP Field, Nashville, Tennessee

- Date: December 29
- Game time: 12:00 p.m. CST
- Game weather: 54 °F (12 °C), (Sunny)
- Game attendance: 69,143
- Referee: Terry McAulay
- TV announcers (CBS): Andrew Catalon and Adam Archuleta
- Recap, Game book

Game information

**First quarter**

**Second quarter**

**Third quarter**

**Fourth quarter**

**Top passers**

- HOU –
- TEN –

**Top rushers**

- HOU –
- TEN –

**Top receivers**

- HOU –
- TEN –

**Top tacklers**

- HOU –
- TEN –

== Standings ==
=== Division ===
AFC South
	W	L	T	PCT	DIV	CONF	PF	PA	STK
^{(4)} Indianapolis Colts	11	5	0	.688	6–0	9–3	391	336	W3
Tennessee Titans	7	9	0	.438	2–4	6–6	362	381	W2
Jacksonville Jaguars	4	12	0	.250	3–3	4–8	247	449	L3
Houston Texans	2	14	0	.125	1–5	2–10	276	428	L14

=== Conference ===
AFC
#	Team	Division	W	L	T	PCT	DIV	CONF	SOS	SOV	STK
Division winners
1	Denver Broncos	West	13	3	0	.813	5–1	9–3	.469	.423	W2
2	New England Patriots	East	12	4	0	.750	4–2	9–3	.473	.427	W2
3 (Note: Cincinnati defeated Indianapolis head-to-head (Week 14, 42–28).)	Cincinnati Bengals	North	11	5	0	.688	3–3	8–4	.480	.494	W2
4	Indianapolis Colts	South	11	5	0	.688	6–0	9–3	.484	.449	W3
Wild cards
5	Kansas City Chiefs	West	11	5	0	.688	2–4	7–5	.445	.335	L2
6	San Diego Chargers	West	9	7	0	.563	4–2	6–6	.496	.549	W4
Did not qualify for the postseason
7 (Note: Pittsburgh finished with a better division record than Baltimore.) (Note: Pittsburgh defeated the New York Jets head-to-head (Week 6, 19–6).)	Pittsburgh Steelers	North	8	8	0	.500	4–2	6–6	.469	.441	W3
8 (Note: Baltimore defeated the New York Jets head-to-head (Week 12, 19–3).)	Baltimore Ravens	North	8	8	0	.500	3–3	6–6	.484	.418	L2
9 (Note: The New York Jets finished with a better division record than Miami.)	New York Jets	East	8	8	0	.500	3–3	5–7	.488	.414	W2
10	Miami Dolphins	East	8	8	0	.500	2–4	7–5	.523	.523	L2
11	Tennessee Titans	South	7	9	0	.438	2–4	6–6	.504	.375	W2
12	Buffalo Bills	East	6	10	0	.375	3–3	5–7	.520	.500	L1
13 (Note: Oakland and Jacksonville finished with a better conference record than Cleveland.) (Note: Oakland defeated Jacksonville head-to-head (Week 2, 19–9).)	Oakland Raiders	West	4	12	0	.250	1–5	4–8	.523	.359	L6
14 (Note: Jacksonville defeated Cleveland head-to-head (Week 13, 32–28).)	Jacksonville Jaguars	South	4	12	0	.250	3–3	4–8	.504	.234	L3
15	Cleveland Browns	North	4	12	0	.250	2–4	3–9	.516	.477	L7
16	Houston Texans	South	2	14	0	.125	1–5	2–10	.559	.500	L14
Tiebreakers (Note: When breaking ties for three or more teams under the NFL's rules, they are first broken within divisions, then comparing only the highest ranked remaining team from each division.)
