= 2012 Tennessee Titans season =

53rd season in franchise history; final full one under ownership of Bud Adams

- Owner: Bud Adams
- General manager: Ruston Webster
- Head coach: Mike Munchak
- Home stadium: LP Field

Results
- Record: 6–10
- Division place: 3rd AFC South
- Playoffs: Did not qualify

Uniform
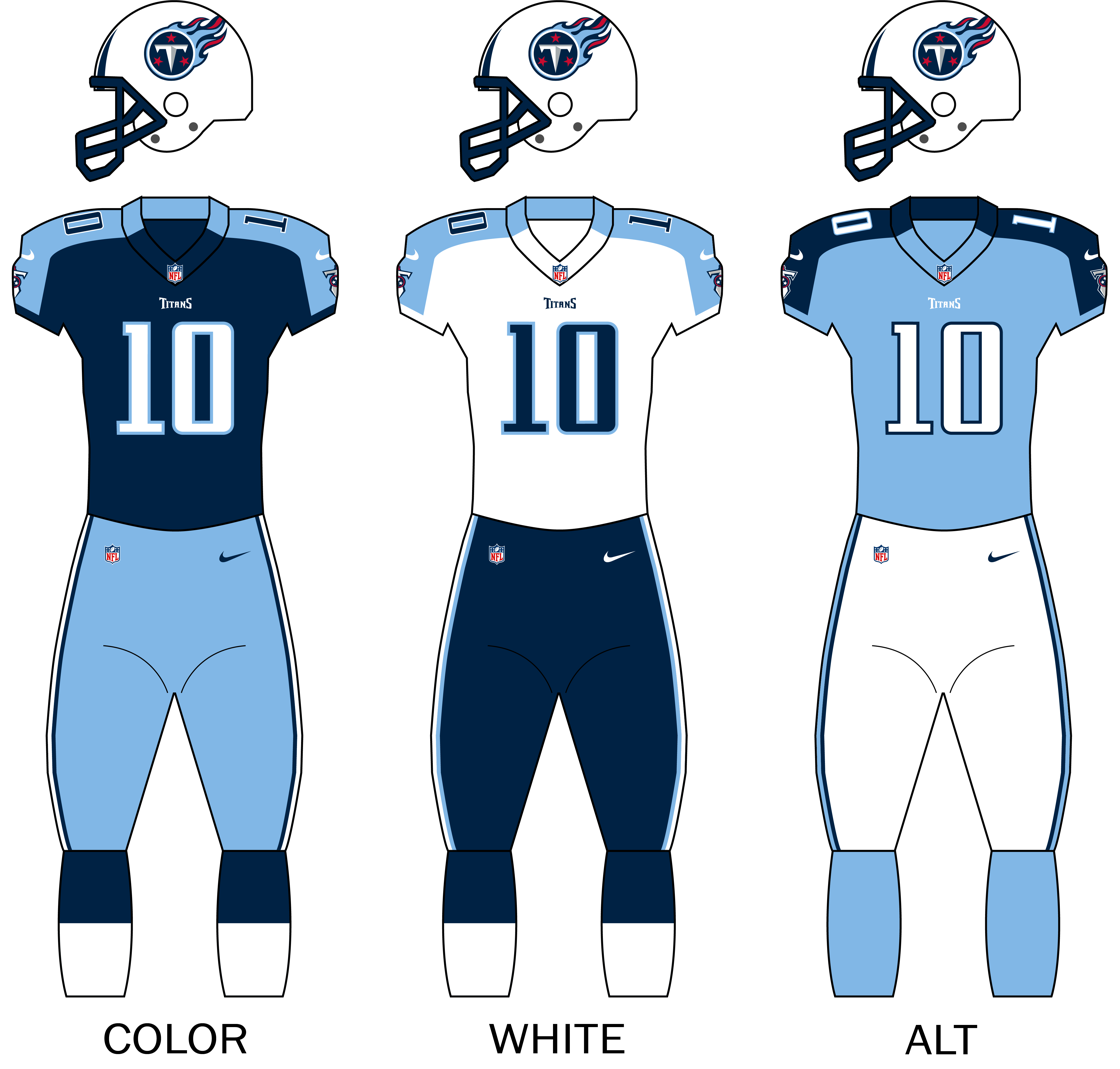

The 2012 season was the Tennessee Titans' 43rd in the National Football League (NFL), their 53rd overall, their 16th in the state of Tennessee and their second under head coach Mike Munchak. It was also the last full season under the ownership of Bud Adams, who died on October 21, 2013. The Titans failed to improve on their 9–7 record in 2011 and were eliminated from postseason contention in Week 14.

== 2012 draft class ==
2012 Tennessee Titans Draft
| Round | Selection | Player | Position | College |
|---|---|---|---|---|
| 1 | 20 | Kendall Wright | Wide receiver | Baylor |
| 2 | 52 | Zach Brown | Linebacker | North Carolina |
| 3 | 82 | Mike Martin | Defensive tackle | Michigan |
| 4 | 115 | Coty Sensabaugh | Cornerback | Clemson |
| 5 | 145^{[a]} | Taylor Thompson | Tight end | SMU |
| 6 | 190 | Markelle Martin | Safety | Oklahoma State |
| 7 | 227^{[b]} | Scott Solomon | Defensive end | Rice |

Notes

^{^[a]} Traded up to acquire pick from the Dolphins.
^{^[b]}Pick from the Browns through the Vikings.

== Staff ==
2012 Tennessee Titans staff
| Front office: Founder/owner/chairman/president/CEO – Bud Adams; Senior executive vice president/chief operating officer – Mike Reinfeldt; Executive vice president/general manager – Ruston Webster; Vice president of player personnel – Lake Dawson; Vice president of football administration – Vin Marino; Director of college scouting – Blake Beddingfield; Head coaches: Head coach – Mike Munchak; Offensive coaches: Offensive coordinator – Chris Palmer (fired Nov. 26, 2012); Quarterbacks/interim offensive coordinator – Dowell Loggains; Running backs – Jim Skipper; Wide receivers – Dave Ragone; Tight ends – John Zernhelt; Offensive line – Bruce Matthews; Assistant offensive line – Nate Kaczor; Offensive assistant/quality control – Arthur Smith | Defensive coaches: Defensive coordinator – Jerry Gray; Defensive line – Tracy Rocker; Linebackers – Frank Bush; Secondary – Brett Maxie; Assistant secondary – Steve Brown; Defensive assistant/pass rush specialist – Keith Millard; Defensive assistant/quality control – Jonathan Gannon; Special teams coaches: Special teams – Alan Lowry; Special teams assistant – Chet Parlavecchio; Strength and conditioning: Assistant head coach/strength and conditioning – Steve Watterson |

== Final roster ==
2012 Tennessee Titans roster
| Quarterbacks (QB): 8 Matt Hasselbeck; 10 Jake Locker; 11 Rusty Smith; Running backs (RB): 23 Jamie Harper; 28 Chris Johnson; 45 Quinn Johnson; 42 Collin Mooney; 25 Darius Reynaud; Wide receivers (WR): 18 Kenny Britt; 87 Lavelle Hawkins; 14 Michael Preston; 85 Nate Washington; 17 Damian Williams; 13 Kendall Wright; Tight ends (TE): 81 Brandon Barden; 88 Craig Stevens; 84 Taylor Thompson | Offensive linemen (OL): 70 Daniel Baldridge T; 62 Kyle DeVan C/G; 72 Deuce Lutui G; 60 Kevin Matthews C/G; 66 Mike Otto T; 67 Mitch Petrus G; 71 Michael Roos T; 68 Byron Stingily T; 61 Fernando Velasco C/G; Defensive linemen (DL): 99 Jurrell Casey DT; 96 DaJohn Harris DE; 97 Karl Klug DT; 94 Sen'Derrick Marks DT; 93 Mike Martin DT; 91 Derrick Morgan DE; 90 Scott Solomon DE; 95 Kamerion Wimbley DE; 79 Jarius Wynn DE | Linebackers (LB): 58 Xavier Adibi OLB; 56 Akeem Ayers OLB; 57 Patrick Bailey OLB; 55 Zach Brown OLB; 59 Tim Shaw MLB; 92 Will Witherspoon MLB; Defensive backs (DB): 38 Al Afalava SS; 26 Jordan Babineaux SS; 37 Tommie Campbell CB; 33 Michael Griffin FS; 30 Jason McCourty CB; 29 Ryan Mouton CB; 24 Coty Sensabaugh CB; 20 Alterraun Verner CB; 35 Tracy Wilson FS; Special teams (ST): 2 Rob Bironas K; 48 Beau Brinkley LS; 6 Brett Kern P | Practice squad: 39 Alvester Alexander RB; 19 Diondre Borel WR; 69 Zach Clayton DT; 62 Chris DeGeare G (PS/I); 58 Thaddeus Gibson LB; 69 Tyler Horn C; 46 Mike Mohamed LB (PS/I); 41 Suaesi Tuimaunei S; 80 Martell Webb TE; Reserve: 54 Eugene Amano C (IR); 98 Dave Ball DE (IR); 89 Jared Cook TE (IR); 75 Keyunta Dawson DE (IR); 53 Zac Diles MLB (IR); 78 Leger Douzable DT (IR); 36 Darren Evans RB (IR); 64 Leroy Harris G (IR); 73 Steve Hutchinson G (IR); 32 Robert Johnson SS (IR); 50 Kevin Malast OLB (IR); 83 Marc Mariani WR (IR); 31 Markelle Martin FS (PUP); 52 Colin McCarthy MLB (IR); 51 Gerald McRath OLB (IR); 21 Javon Ringer RB (IR); 76 David Stewart T (IR); Rookies in italics 53 active, 19 reserve, 7 practice squad |

== Schedule ==
=== Preseason ===
| Week | Date | Opponent | Result | Record | Venue | Recap |
|---|---|---|---|---|---|---|
| 1 | August 11 | at Seattle Seahawks | **L** 17–27 | 0–1 | CenturyLink Field | Recap |
| 2 | August 17 | at Tampa Bay Buccaneers | **W** 30–7 | 1–1 | Raymond James Stadium | Recap |
| 3 | August 23 | Arizona Cardinals | **W** 32–27 | 2–1 | LP Field | Recap |
| 4 | August 30 | New Orleans Saints | **W** 10–6 | 3–1 | LP Field | Recap |

=== Regular season ===
| Week | Date | Opponent | Result | Record | Venue | Recap |
|---|---|---|---|---|---|---|
| 1 | September 9 | New England Patriots | **L** 13–34 | 0–1 | LP Field | Recap |
| 2 | September 16 | at San Diego Chargers | **L** 10–38 | 0–2 | Qualcomm Stadium | Recap |
| 3 | September 23 | Detroit Lions | **W** 44–41 (OT) | 1–2 | LP Field | Recap |
| 4 | September 30 | at **Houston Texans** | **L** 14–38 | 1–3 | Reliant Stadium | Recap |
| 5 | October 7 | at Minnesota Vikings | **L** 7–30 | 1–4 | Mall of America Field | Recap |
| 6 | October 11 | Pittsburgh Steelers | **W** 26–23 | 2–4 | LP Field | Recap |
| 7 | October 21 | at Buffalo Bills | **W** 35–34 | 3–4 | Ralph Wilson Stadium | Recap |
| 8 | October 28 | **Indianapolis Colts** | **L** 13–19 (OT) | 3–5 | LP Field | Recap |
| 9 | November 4 | Chicago Bears | **L** 20–51 | 3–6 | LP Field | Recap |
| 10 | November 11 | at Miami Dolphins | **W** 37–3 | 4–6 | Sun Life Stadium | Recap |
| 11 | Bye | | | | | |
| 12 | November 25 | at **Jacksonville Jaguars** | **L** 19–24 | 4–7 | EverBank Field | Recap |
| 13 | December 2 | **Houston Texans** | **L** 10–24 | 4–8 | LP Field | Recap |
| 14 | December 9 | at **Indianapolis Colts** | **L** 23–27 | 4–9 | Lucas Oil Stadium | Recap |
| 15 | December 17 | New York Jets | **W** 14–10 | 5–9 | LP Field | Recap |
| 16 | December 23 | at Green Bay Packers | **L** 7–55 | 5–10 | Lambeau Field | Recap |
| 17 | December 30 | **Jacksonville Jaguars** | **W** 38–20 | 6–10 | LP Field | Recap |

Note: Intra-division opponents are in bold text.

=== Game summaries ===
==== Week 1: vs. New England Patriots ====
Week One: New England Patriots at Tennessee Titans – Game summary

| Quarter | 1 | 2 | 3 | 4 | Total |
|---|---|---|---|---|---|
| **Patriots** | 7 | 14 | 7 | 6 | **34** |
| Titans | 3 | 0 | 7 | 3 | **13** |

at LP Field, Nashville, Tennessee

- Date: September 9
- Game time: 12:00 p.m. CDT
- Game weather: 78 °F (26 °C), sunny
- Game attendance: 69,143
- Referee: Jerry Frump
- TV announcers (CBS): Jim Nantz and Phil Simms

Game information

**First quarter**

**Second quarter**

**Third quarter**

**Fourth quarter**

**Top passers**

- NE – Tom Brady, 23/31, 236 Yds, 2 TD, 0 INT
- TEN – Jake Locker, 23/32, 229 Yds, 1 TD, 1 INT

**Top rushers**

- NE – Stevan Ridley, 21 Car, 125 Yds, 1 TD
- TEN – Jake Locker, 2 Car, 11 Yds, 0 TD

**Top receivers**

- NE – Brandon Lloyd, 5 Rec, 69 Yds, 0 TD
- TEN – Jared Cook, 4 Rec, 64 Yds, 0 TD

**Top tacklers**

- NE –
- TEN –

Jake Locker's first NFL start was a rough affair; he was 23–32 for 229 yards and a 29-yard touchdown to Nate Washington. The Patriots forced a fumble by Locker near the Titans' goal line, and Dont'a Hightower grabbed the ball and scored. The Patriots behind Tom Brady's 236 passing yards and 125 rushing yards from Stevan Ridley won 34–14. Chris Johnson was limited to just four rushing yards on 11 carries. With the brutally disappointing loss, Tennssee started the season 0-1. This marked their last home loss to New England until 2025.

==== Week 2: at San Diego Chargers ====
Week Two: Tennessee Titans at San Diego Chargers – Game summary

| Quarter | 1 | 2 | 3 | 4 | Total |
|---|---|---|---|---|---|
| Titans | 0 | 3 | 7 | 0 | **10** |
| **Chargers** | 14 | 3 | 7 | 14 | **38** |

at Qualcomm Stadium, San Diego, California

- Date: September 16
- Game time: 3:25 p.m. CDT/1:25 p.m. PDT
- Game weather: 85 °F (29 °C), sunny
- Game attendance: 60,804
- Referee: Bruce Hermanson
- TV announcers (CBS): Ian Eagle and Dan Fouts

Game information

**First quarter**

**Second quarter**

**Third quarter**

**Fourth quarter**

**Top passers**

- TEN –
- SD –

**Top rushers**

- TEN –
- SD –

**Top receivers**

- TEN –
- SD –

**Top tacklers**

- TEN –
- SD –

==== Week 3: vs. Detroit Lions ====
Week Three: Detroit Lions at Tennessee Titans – Game summary

| Quarter | 1 | 2 | 3 | 4 | OT | Total |
|---|---|---|---|---|---|---|
| Lions | 6 | 3 | 7 | 25 | 0 | **41** |
| **Titans** | 10 | 10 | 0 | 21 | 3 | **44** |

at LP Field, Nashville, Tennessee

- Date: September 23
- Game time: 12:00 p.m. CDT
- Game weather: 68 °F (20 °C), sunny
- Game attendance: 69,143
- Referee: Gerald Wright
- TV announcers (Fox): Ron Pitts, Mike Martz and Kristina Pink

Game information

**First quarter**

**Second quarter**

**Third quarter**

**Fourth quarter**

**Top passers**

- DET –
- TEN –

**Top rushers**

- DET –
- TEN –

**Top receivers**

- DET –
- TEN –

**Top tacklers**

- DET –
- TEN –

With the massive defensive stop in overtime, the Titans secured their first win of the season to improve to 1-2. This would be the highest scoring game of the 2012 NFL season.

==== Week 4: at Houston Texans ====
Week Four: Tennessee Titans at Houston Texans – Game summary

| Quarter | 1 | 2 | 3 | 4 | Total |
|---|---|---|---|---|---|
| Titans | 0 | 7 | 0 | 7 | **14** |
| **Texans** | 14 | 0 | 14 | 10 | **38** |

at Reliant Stadium, Houston, Texas

- Date: September 30
- Game time: 12:00 p.m. CDT
- Game weather: Played indoors (retractable roof closed)
- Game attendance: 71,581
- Referee: Carl Cheffers
- TV announcers (CBS): Ian Eagle and Dan Fouts

Game information

**First quarter**

- HOU- James Casey, 11-yard pass from Matt Schaub, Shayne Graham XP good 11:41 (HOU 7–0)

**Second quarter** **Third quarter** **Fourth quarter**

**Top passers**

- TEN –
- HOU –

**Top rushers**

- TEN –
- HOU –

**Top receivers**

- TEN –
- HOU –

**Top tacklers**

- TEN –
- HOU –

==== Week 5: at Minnesota Vikings ====
Week Five: Tennessee Titans at Minnesota Vikings – Game summary

| Quarter | 1 | 2 | 3 | 4 | Total |
|---|---|---|---|---|---|
| Titans | 0 | 0 | 0 | 7 | **7** |
| **Vikings** | 7 | 6 | 10 | 7 | **30** |

at Mall of America Field at the Hubert H. Humphrey Metrodome, Minneapolis, Minnesota

- Date: October 7
- Game time: 3:25 p.m. CDT
- Game weather: Played indoors (dome stadium)
- Game attendance: 57,652
- Referee: Jeff Triplette
- TV announcers (CBS): Bill Macatee and Steve Tasker

Game information

**First quarter**

**Second quarter**

**Third quarter**

**Fourth quarter**

**Top passers**

- TEN –
- MIN –

**Top rushers**

- TEN –
- MIN –

**Top receivers**

- TEN –
- MIN –

**Top tacklers**

- TEN –
- MIN –

==== Week 6: vs. Pittsburgh Steelers ====
Week Six: Pittsburgh Steelers at Tennessee Titans – Game summary

| Quarter | 1 | 2 | 3 | 4 | Total |
|---|---|---|---|---|---|
| Steelers | 10 | 0 | 3 | 10 | **23** |
| **Titans** | 6 | 10 | 0 | 10 | **26** |

at LP Field, Nashville, Tennessee

- Date: October 11
- Game time: 7:20 p.m. CDT
- Game weather: 59 °F (15 °C), cloudy
- Game attendance: 69,143
- Referee: Ed Hochuli
- TV announcers (NFLN): Brad Nessler, Mike Mayock and Alex Flanagan

Game information

**First quarter**

**Second quarter**

**Third quarter**

**Fourth quarter**

**Top passers**

- PIT –
- TEN –

**Top rushers**

- PIT –
- TEN –

**Top receivers**

- PIT –
- TEN –

**Top tacklers**

- PIT –
- TEN –

==== Week 7: at Buffalo Bills ====
Week Seven: Tennessee Titans at Buffalo Bills – Game summary

| Quarter | 1 | 2 | 3 | 4 | Total |
|---|---|---|---|---|---|
| **Titans** | 14 | 7 | 7 | 7 | **35** |
| Bills | 14 | 6 | 14 | 0 | **34** |

at Ralph Wilson Stadium, Orchard Park, New York

- Date: October 21
- Game time: 1:00 p.m. EDT/12:00 p.m. CDT
- Game weather: 55 °F (13 °C), mostly sunny
- Game attendance: 68,836
- Referee: Mike Carey
- TV announcers (CBS): Marv Albert and Rich Gannon

Game information

**First quarter**

**Second quarter**

**Third quarter**

**Fourth quarter**

**Top passers**

- TEN –
- BUF –

**Top rushers**

- TEN –
- BUF –

**Top receivers**

- TEN –
- BUF –

**Top tacklers**

- TEN –
- BUF –

==== Week 8: vs. Indianapolis Colts ====
Week Eight: Indianapolis Colts at Tennessee Titans – Game summary

| Quarter | 1 | 2 | 3 | 4 | OT | Total |
|---|---|---|---|---|---|---|
| **Colts** | 3 | 0 | 3 | 7 | 6 | **19** |
| Titans | 3 | 7 | 0 | 3 | 0 | **13** |

at LP Field, Nashville, Tennessee

- Date: October 28
- Game time: 12:00 p.m. CDT
- Game weather: 57 °F (14 °C), sunny
- Game attendance: 69,143
- Referee: Alberto Riveron
- TV announcers (CBS): Bill Macatee and Steve Tasker

Game information

**First quarter**

**Second quarter**

**Third quarter**

**Fourth quarter**

**Top passers**

- IND –
- TEN –

**Top rushers**

- IND –
- TEN –

**Top receivers**

- IND –
- TEN –

**Top tacklers**

- IND –
- TEN –

==== Week 9: vs. Chicago Bears ====
Week Nine: Chicago Bears at Tennessee Titans – Game summary

| Quarter | 1 | 2 | 3 | 4 | Total |
|---|---|---|---|---|---|
| **Bears** | 28 | 3 | 6 | 14 | **51** |
| Titans | 2 | 3 | 7 | 8 | **20** |

at LP Field, Nashville, Tennessee

- Date: November 4
- Game time: 12:00 p.m. CST
- Game weather: 56 °F (13 °C), mostly cloudy
- Game attendance: 69,143
- Referee: Terry McAulay
- TV announcers (Fox): Thom Brennaman, Brian Billick and Laura Okmin

Game information

**First quarter**

**Second quarter**

**Third quarter**

**Fourth quarter**

**Top passers**

- CHI –
- TEN –

**Top rushers**

- CHI –
- TEN –

**Top receivers**

- CHI –
- TEN –

**Top tacklers**

- CHI –
- TEN –

==== Week 10: at Miami Dolphins ====
Week Ten: Tennessee Titans at Miami Dolphins – Game summary

| Quarter | 1 | 2 | 3 | 4 | Total |
|---|---|---|---|---|---|
| **Titans** | 14 | 10 | 7 | 6 | **37** |
| Dolphins | 0 | 3 | 0 | 0 | **3** |

at Sun Life Stadium, Miami Gardens, Florida

- Date: November 11
- Game time: 1:00 p.m. EST/12:00 p.m. CST
- Game weather: 78 °F (26 °C), partly cloudy
- Game attendance: 60,165
- Referee: Walt Anderson
- TV announcers (CBS): Spero Dedes and Steve Tasker

Game information

**First quarter**

**Second quarter**

**Third quarter**

**Fourth quarter**

**Top passers**

- TEN –
- MIA –

**Top rushers**

- TEN –
- MIA –

**Top receivers**

- TEN –
- MIA –

**Top tacklers**

- TEN –
- MIA –

==== Week 12: at Jacksonville Jaguars ====
Week Twelve: Tennessee Titans at Jacksonville Jaguars – Game summary

| Quarter | 1 | 2 | 3 | 4 | Total |
|---|---|---|---|---|---|
| Titans | 3 | 3 | 3 | 10 | **19** |
| **Jaguars** | 7 | 0 | 7 | 10 | **24** |

at EverBank Field, Jacksonville, Florida

- Date: November 25
- Game time: 1:00 p.m. EST
- Game weather: 60 °F (16 °C), sunny
- Game attendance: 63,323
- Referee: Walt Anderson
- TV announcers (CBS): Spero Dedes and Steve Beuerlein
- Recap, Game Book

Game information

**First quarter**

- TEN – Rob Bironas 38-yard field goal, 13:32. Titans 3–0. **Drive: 4 plays, 8 yards, 1:23.**
- JAC – Rashad Jennings 1-yard run (Josh Scobee kick), 0:12. Jaguars 7–3. **Drive: 12 plays, 75 yards, 7:19.**

**Second quarter**

- TEN – Rob Bironas 40-yard field goal, 0:11. Jaguars 7–6. **Drive: 6 plays, 33 yards, 0:36.**

**Third quarter**

- JAC – Cecil Shorts 59-yard pass from Chad Henne (Josh Scobee kick), 8:40. Jaguars 14–6. **Drive: 6 plays, 75 yards, 2:59.**
- TEN – Rob Bironas 39-yard field goal, 3:26. Jaguars 14–9. **Drive: 12 plays, 64 yards, 5:14.**

**Fourth quarter**

- TEN – Rob Bironas 33-yard field goal, 10:05. Jaguars 14–12. **Drive: 10 plays, 72 yards, 2:51.**
- JAC – Justin Blackmon 7-yard pass from Chad Henne (Josh Scobee kick), 6:50. Jaguars 21–12. **Drive: 8 plays, 80 yards, 3:15.**
- TEN – Kenny Britt 6-yard pass from Jake Locker (Rob Bironas kick), 4:52. Jaguars 21–19. **Drive: 6 plays, 78 yards, 1:58.**
- JAC – Josh Scobee 41-yard field goal, 0:24. Jaguars 24–19. **Drive: 6 plays, 31 yards, 2:16.**

**Top passers**

- TEN – Jake Locker – 23/40, 261 yards, TD, 2 INT
- JAC – Chad Henne – 17/26, 261 yards, 2 TD, INT

**Top rushers**

- TEN – Chris Johnson – 21 rushes, 80 yards
- JAC – Jalen Parmele – 8 rushes, 45 yards

**Top receivers**

- TEN – Nate Washington – 4 receptions, 54 yards
- JAC – Calvin Johnson – 4 receptions, 105 yards, TD

**Top tacklers**

- TEN – Zach Brown – 8 tackles, 2 assists, 1.5 sacks
- JAC – Dawan Landry – 8 tackles

==== Week 13: vs. Houston Texans ====
Week Thirteen: Houston Texans at Tennessee Titans – Game summary

| Quarter | 1 | 2 | 3 | 4 | Total |
|---|---|---|---|---|---|
| **Texans** | 14 | 7 | 3 | 0 | **24** |
| Titans | 3 | 0 | 7 | 0 | **10** |

at LP Field, Nashville, Tennessee

- Date: December 2
- Game time: 12:00 p.m. CST
- Game weather: 67 °F (19 °C), cloudy
- Game attendance: 69,143
- Referee: Tony Corrente
- TV announcers (CBS): Kevin Harlan and Solomon Wilcots

Game information

**First quarter**

**Second quarter**

**Third quarter**

**Fourth quarter**

**Top passers**

- HOU –
- TEN –

**Top rushers**

- HOU –
- TEN –

**Top receivers**

- HOU –
- TEN –

**Top tacklers**

- HOU –
- TEN –

With the loss, the Titans fell to 4–8 and were swept by the Texans for the first time since 2004.

==== Week 14: at Indianapolis Colts ====
Week Fourteen: Tennessee Titans at Indianapolis Colts – Game summary

| Quarter | 1 | 2 | 3 | 4 | Total |
|---|---|---|---|---|---|
| Titans | 7 | 13 | 0 | 3 | **23** |
| **Colts** | 7 | 0 | 14 | 6 | **27** |

at Lucas Oil Stadium, Indianapolis, Indiana

- Date: December 9
- Game time: 1:00 p.m. EST/12:00 p.m. CST
- Game weather: Played indoors (retractable roof closed)
- Game attendance: 64,688
- Referee: Pete Morelli
- TV announcers (CBS): Ian Eagle and Dan Fouts

Game information

**First quarter**

**Second quarter**

**Third quarter**

**Fourth quarter**

**Top passers**

- TEN –
- IND –

**Top rushers**

- TEN –
- IND –

**Top receivers**

- TEN –
- IND –

**Top tacklers**

- TEN –
- IND –

With the close loss, the Titans fell to 4-9, and they were eliminated from playoff contention.

==== Week 15: vs. New York Jets ====
Week Fifteen: New York Jets at Tennessee Titans – Game summary

| Quarter | 1 | 2 | 3 | 4 | Total |
|---|---|---|---|---|---|
| Jets | 3 | 0 | 7 | 0 | **10** |
| **Titans** | 0 | 7 | 7 | 0 | **14** |

at LP Field, Nashville, Tennessee

- Date: December 17
- Game time: 7:30 p.m. CST
- Game weather: 52 °F (11 °C), cloudy
- Referee: Walt Coleman
- TV announcers (ESPN): Mike Tirico, Jon Gruden and Lisa Salters

Game information

**First quarter**

**Second quarter**

**Third quarter**

**Fourth quarter**

**Top passers**

- NYJ –
- TEN –

**Top rushers**

- NYJ –
- TEN –

**Top receivers**

- NYJ –
- TEN –

**Top tacklers**

- NYJ –
- TEN –

==== Week 16: at Green Bay Packers ====
Week Sixteen: Tennessee Titans at Green Bay Packers – Game summary

| Quarter | 1 | 2 | 3 | 4 | Total |
|---|---|---|---|---|---|
| Titans | 0 | 0 | 0 | 0 | **0** |
| **Packers** | 14 | 6 | 14 | 21 | **55** |

at Lambeau Field, Green Bay, Wisconsin

- Date: December 23
- Game time: 12:00 p.m. CST
- Game weather: 24 °F (−4 °C), mostly sunny
- Game attendance: 70,508
- Referee: Clete Blakeman
- TV announcers (CBS): Greg Gumbel and Dan Dierdorf

Game information

**First quarter**

- GB – Aaron Rodgers 6 yd. TD run, Mason Crosby XP good, 6:54 (GB 7–0)
- GB – Randall Cobb 20 Yard TD Pass from Aaron Rodgers, Mason Crosby XP good, 4:28 (GB 14–0)

**Second quarter**

- GB – Mason Crosby 26 Yard FG, 14:36 (GB 17–0)
- GB – Mason Crosby 48 Yard FG, 4:40 (GB 20–0)

**Third quarter**

- GB – DuJuan Harris 7 yd. TD run, Mason Crosby XP good, 12:04 (GB 27–0)
- GB – Greg Jennings 1 Yard TD Pass from Aaron Rodgers, Mason Crosby XP, 5:47 (GB 34–0)

**Fourth quarter**

- GB – James Jones 12 Yard TD Pass from Aaron Rodgers, Mason Crosby XP, 14:11 (GB 41–0)
- GB – Ryan Grant 7 yd. TD run, Mason Crosby XP good, 12:31 (GB 48–0)
- GB – Ryan Grant 9 yd. TD run, Mason Crosby XP good, 6:25 (GB 55–0)

**Top passers**

- TEN –
- GB – TWENTY

**Top rushers**

- TEN –
- GB –

**Top receivers**

- TEN –
- GB –

**Top tacklers**

- TEN –
- GB –

With their worst loss since 2009, the Titans dropped to 5-10 and finished 1-3 against the NFC North.

==== Week 17: vs. Jacksonville Jaguars ====
Week Seventeen: Jacksonville Jaguars at Tennessee Titans – Game summary

| Quarter | 1 | 2 | 3 | 4 | Total |
|---|---|---|---|---|---|
| Jaguars | 7 | 7 | 0 | 6 | **20** |
| **Titans** | 7 | 14 | 14 | 3 | **38** |

at LP Field, Nashville, Tennessee

- Date: December 30
- Game time: 12:00 p.m. CST
- Game weather: 37 °F (3 °C), sunny
- Game attendance: 69,143
- Referee: Bill Vinovich
- TV announcers (CBS): Don Criqui and Randy Cross
- Recap, Game Book

Game information

**First quarter**

- TEN – Chris Johnson 2-yard run (Rob Bironas kick), 11:34. Titans 7–0. **Drive: 7 plays, 79 yards, 3:26.**
- JAC – Jordan Shipley 5-yard pass from Chad Henne (Josh Scobee kick), 5:40. Tied 7–7. **Drive: 10 plays, 76 yards, 5:54.**

**Second quarter**

- JAC – Justin Blackmon 30-yard pass from Chad Henne (Josh Scobee kick), 14:53. Jaguars 14–7. **Drive: 7 plays, 61 yards, 4:07.**
- TEN – Zach Brown 79-yard interception return (Rob Bironas kick), 1:48. Tied 14–14.
- TEN – Darius Reynaud 69-yard punt return (Rob Bironas kick), 0:33. Titans 21–14.

**Third quarter**

- TEN – Darius Reynaud 81-yard punt return (Rob Bironas kick), 12:54. Titans 28–14.
- TEN – Zach Brown 30-yard interception return (Rob Bironas kick), 12:03. Titans 35–14.

**Fourth quarter**

- TEN – Rob Bironas 48-yard field goal, 12:26. Titans 38–14. **Drive: 13 plays, 41 yards, 6:34.**
- JAC – Mike Harris 19-yard return of blocked punt (pass failed), 2:16. Titans 38–20.

**Top passers**

- JAC – Chad Henne – 25/41, 298 yards, 2 TD, 3 INT
- TEN – Jake Locker – 9/15, 152 yards

**Top rushers**

- JAC – Keith Toston – 17 rushes, 74 yards
- TEN – Chris Johnson – 21 rushes, 56 yards, TD

**Top receivers**

- JAC – Marcedes Lewis – 7 receptions, 103 yards
- TEN – Lavelle Hawkins – 1 reception, 42 yards

**Top tacklers**

- JAC – Paul Posluszny – 6 tackles, 4 assists, 2 sacks
- TEN – Al Afalava – 5 tackles, 4 assists

== Standings ==
AFC South
| | W | L | T | PCT | DIV | CONF | PF | PA | STK |
|---|---|---|---|---|---|---|---|---|---|
| ^{(3)} Houston Texans | 12 | 4 | 0 | .750 | 5–1 | 10–2 | 416 | 331 | L2 |
| ^{(5)} Indianapolis Colts | 11 | 5 | 0 | .688 | 4–2 | 8–4 | 357 | 387 | W2 |
| Tennessee Titans | 6 | 10 | 0 | .375 | 1–5 | 5–7 | 330 | 471 | W1 |
| Jacksonville Jaguars | 2 | 14 | 0 | .125 | 2–4 | 2–10 | 255 | 444 | L5 |
