= Zach Brown =

American football player (born 1989)

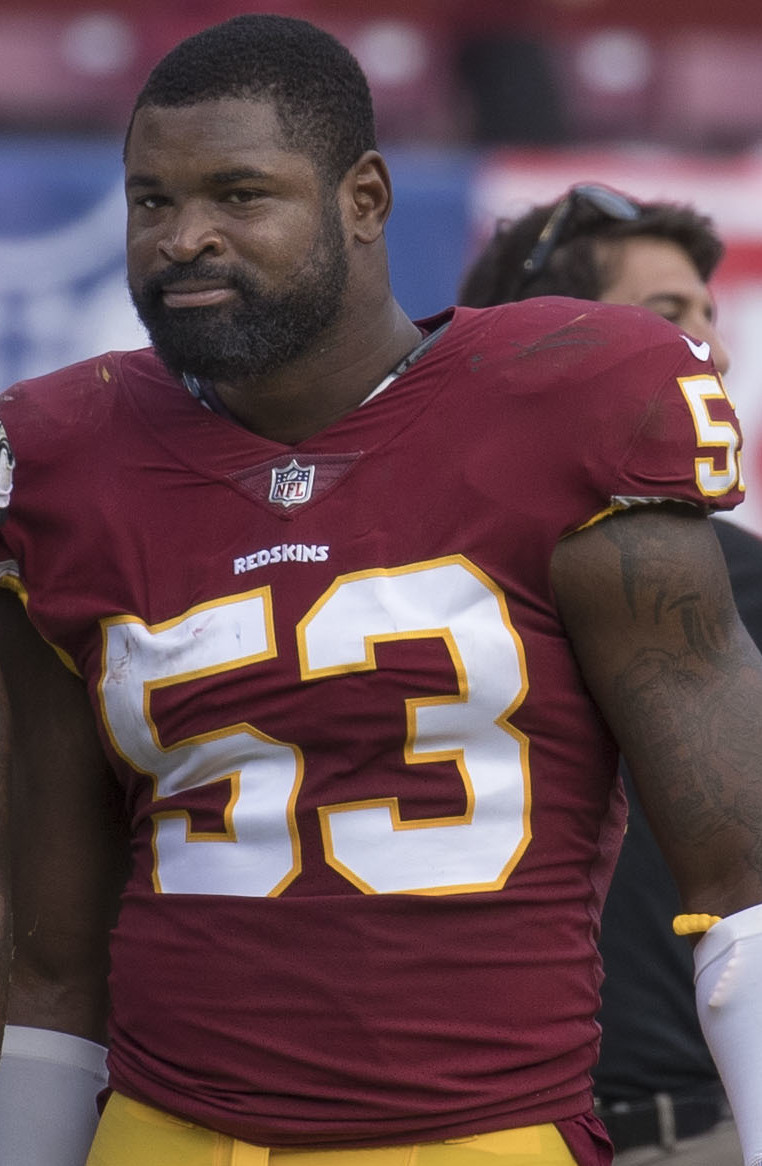
- Brown with the Washington Redskins in 2017

No. 55, 53, 52
- Position: Linebacker

Personal information
- Born: October 23, 1989 (age 37); Beaufort, South Carolina, U.S.
- Listed height: 6 ft 1 in (1.85 m)
- Listed weight: 250 lb (113 kg)

Career information
- High school: Wilde Lake (Columbia, Maryland)
- College: North Carolina (2008–2011)
- NFL draft: 2012: 2nd round, 52nd overall pick

Career history
- Tennessee Titans (2012–2015); Buffalo Bills (2016); Washington Redskins (2017–2018); Philadelphia Eagles (2019); Arizona Cardinals (2019)

Awards and highlights
- Second-team All-Pro (2016); Pro Bowl (2016); First-team All-ACC (2011); NFL record: Most interceptions returned for touchdown in a game: 2 (tied)

Career NFL statistics
- Total tackles: 664
- Sacks: 17.5
- Forced fumbles: 6
- Fumble recoveries: 3
- Interceptions: 7
- Defensive touchdowns: 2
- Stats at Pro Football Reference

Zachary Vinzale Brown (born October 23, 1989) is an American former professional football player who was a linebacker in the National Football League (NFL). He played college football for the North Carolina Tar Heels and was selected by the Tennessee Titans in the second round of the 2012 NFL draft. He also played for the Buffalo Bills, where he made the Pro Bowl, Washington Redskins, Philadelphia Eagles, and Arizona Cardinals.

== Early life ==
=== Track and field ===
Brown was a standout football, wrestling and track athlete at Columbia (MD) Wilde Lake High School. In track, he captured the state class 3-A title in the 100 meters, with a time of 10.67 seconds, becoming one of a few athletes (Andre Martin 1992 100m & 200m; Matt Holthaus 1990 800m, 1600m & 3200m) in school history to win a state title in track. In the 200 meters, his best time was 21.52 seconds. Brown graduated from Wilde Lake in 2007.

Brown also ran track and field for the North Carolina Tar Heels, where he recorded a personal best time of 6.72 seconds in the 60 meters. He also competed in the 200 meters, posting a best season time of 21.75 seconds.

Also known because of his unusual size (6 ft 1 in and 250 lb) and speed for a linebacker, Brown recorded a time of 4.28 seconds time in the 40-yard dash while he was at North Carolina.

=== Wrestling ===
Brown was also an accomplished High School wrestler, finishing his senior season with state, region and county championships in the 215 lb weight class. He was undefeated in his senior year with a record of 25–0. Brown finished his junior year with a record of 30–1 as a state runner-up and county and region champion, with his lone loss coming to two time state champion John Holloway of Magruder High School. As a freshman, Brown was a county runner-up in the 171 lb weight class and took third in his region. He did not place in the state tournament, finishing his freshman year with a record of 23–6.

== College career ==
Brown graduated from the University of North Carolina at Chapel Hill in 2011. Brown spent his freshman year as a reserve linebacker and contributed on special teams. Next year, Brown started six games at weak-side linebacker and also competed on the University of North Carolina track team. As a junior, Brown placed second on the team in tackles and was captain of the special teams unit despite only starting five games. Zach Brown tallied 105 tackles (13.5 tackles for a loss), 3 interceptions, and 5.5 sacks in his senior year.

== Professional career ==
=== Pre-draft ===
Brown attended the NFL Scouting Combine in Indianapolis and completed the majority of combine drills, but opted to skip the three-cone drill, short shuttle, and bench press. On March 19, 2012, Brown participated at North Carolina’s pro day and performed all of the combine drills except for the broad jump. Brown performed a private workout for the Baltimore Ravens and attended a pre-draft visit with the Detroit Lions. At the conclusion of the pre-draft process, Brown was projected to be a second or third round pick by NFL draft experts and scouts. He was ranked as the sixth best outside linebacker prospect in the draft by DraftScout.com, was ranked the sixth best linebacker by NFL analyst Gil Brandt, and was ranked the ninth best outside linebacker by NFL analyst Mike Mayock.

External videos
- Zach Brown’s NFL Combine Workout
- 2012 NFL Draft Profile: Zach Brown

Pre-draft measurables
Height	Weight	Arm length	Hand span	Wingspan	40-yard dash	10-yard split	20-yard split	20-yard shuttle	Three-cone drill	Vertical jump	Broad jump	Bench press
6 ft 1 1/4 in (1.86 m)	244 lb (111 kg)	33 1/4 in (0.84 m)	9 1/2 in (0.24 m)	6 ft 6 in (1.98 m)	4.48 s	1.62 s	2.64 s	4.32 s	7.26 s	35.0 in (0.89 m)	9 ft 8 in (2.95 m)	22 reps
All values from NFL Combine/Pro Day

=== Tennessee Titans ===
==== 2012 ====
The Tennessee Titans drafted Brown in the second round (52nd overall) in the 2012 NFL draft. Brown was the eighth linebacker drafted 2012.

External videos
- Titans draft Zach Brown 52nd overall

On May 12, 2012, the Titans signed Brown to a four-year, $3.85 million contract that includes $1.81 million guaranteed and a signing bonus of $1.24 million. Throughout training camp, Brown competed against Will Witherspoon to be the starting weakside linebacker. Head coach Mike Munchak named Brown the backup weakside linebacker, behind Will Witherspoon, to begin the regular season.

External videos
- Week 17 Can’t Miss Play: Zach Brown to the house

He made his professional regular season debut in the Tennessee Titans’ season-opener against the New England Patriots and made three combined tackles during their 34–13 loss. The following week, Brown earned his first career start after Will Witherspoon was moved to middle linebacker after Colin McCarthy injured his ankle and was sidelined for three games (Weeks 2–4). Brown finished the Titans’ 38–10 loss at the San Diego Chargers with ten combined tackles (six solo) and also recorded his first career sack. Brown sacked Chargers’ quarterback Philip Rivers for a five-yard loss during the second quarter. On November 11, 2012, Brown recorded four solo tackles, deflected a pass, and made his first career interception during a 37–3 victory at the Miami Dolphins in Week 10. Brown intercepted a pass by Dolphins’ quarterback Ryan Tannehill, that was intended for wide receiver Jabar Gaffney, and returned it for a 47-yard gain during the fourth quarter before being tackled by Tannehill. In Week 12, he collected a season-high ten combined tackles (eight solo) during a 24–19 loss at the Jacksonville Jaguars. On December 30, 2012, Brown made four combined tackles, three pass deflections, one sack, and returned two interceptions by Chad Henne for two touchdowns during a 38–20 win against the Jacksonville Jaguars in Week 17. Brown intercepted a pass by Henne, that was intended for tight end Marcedes Lewis, and returned it 79–yards for his first career touchdown during the second quarter. During the third quarter, he intercepted a pass intended for wide receiver Toney Clemons and returned it for a 30-yard touchdown. Brown finished his rookie season in 2012 with 93 combined tackles (68 solo), 5.5 sacks, five pass deflections, three interceptions, two touchdowns, two fumble recoveries, and one forced fumble in 16 games and 14 starts.

==== 2013 ====
External videos
- Zach Brown intercepts Matt McGloin’s pass
- Zach Brown’s fumble recovery

Brown entered training camp slated as the starting weakside linebacker after Will Witherspoon departed for the St. Louis Rams during free agency. Head coach Mike Munchak named Brown and Akeem Ayers the starting outside linebackers to begin the regular season. They started alongside middle linebacker Colin McCarthy. He started in the Tennessee Titans’ season-opener at the Pittsburgh Steelers and made eight solo tackles, deflected a pass, and made a season-high two sacks during a 16–9 victory. In Week 2, he collected a season-high 12 combined tackles (11 solo) during a 30–24 loss at the Houston Texans. In Week 15, Brown was benched during a 37–34 overtime loss against the Arizona Cardinals. He was demoted to a backup role for the following game. He finished the season with 91 combined tackles (52 solo), five pass deflections, four sacks, one interception, and one forced fumble in 16 games and 13 starts.

==== 2014 ====
On January 4, 2014, the Tennessee Titans announced their decision to fire head coach Mike Munchak after the Titans finished the previous season with a 7-9 record. Head coach Ken Whisenhunt hired Ray Horton to replace Jerry Gray as the Titans’ defensive coordinator and also changed the defense from a base 4-3 defense to a base 3-4 defense. Brown was moved to inside linebacker and competed for a starting role against Wesley Woodyard, Colin McCarthy, Moise Fokou, Zaviar Gooden, and Avery Williamson. Head coach Ken Whisenhunt named Brown and Wesley Woodyard the starting inside linebackers to begin the regular season, along with outside linebackers Derrick Morgan and Kamerion Wimbley. Brown started in the Tennessee Titans’ season-opening 26-10 victory at the Kansas City Chiefs, but exited in the first quarter after injuring his shoulder. On September 16, 2014, the Tennessee Titans officially placed Brown on injured reserve for the rest of the 2014 NFL season after it was discovered that Brown has torn his pectoral muscle in Week 1.

==== 2015 ====
External videos
- Andrew Luck picked off by Zach Brown
- Zach Brown sacks Brian Hoyer for a six-yard loss

Throughout training camp, Brown competed against Wesley Woodyard and Avery Williamson to regain his role as a starting inside linebacker. Head coach Ken Whisenhunt named Brown and Avery Williamson the starting inside linebackers to start the season. They started alongside outside linebackers Brian Orakpo and Derrick Morgan. On September 27, 2015, Brown recorded five combined tackles, deflected a pass, and made an interception during a 35–33 loss against the Indianapolis Colts in Week 3. Despite his performance, assistant head coach Dick LeBeau demoted Brown to a backup inside linebacker. Wesley Woodyard replaced him as the starter for the remainder of the season. In Week 6, he collected a season-high 12 combined tackles (eight solo) during a 38–10 loss to the Miami Dolphins. Brown finished his last season with the Tennessee Titans with 77 combined tackles (55 solo), three pass deflections, two interceptions, and was credited with half a sack in 16 games and five starts. He received an overall grade of 69.9 from Pro Football Focus in 2015, which ranked 30th among all qualified linebackers.

=== Buffalo Bills ===
On April 4, 2016, the Buffalo Bills signed Brown to a one-year, $1.25 million contract that includes a $450,000 signing bonus. Throughout training camp, Brown competed for a role as a starting inside linebacker against Reggie Ragland, Brandon Spikes, Preston Brown, and David Hawthorne. Brown earned a starting role after Reggie Ragland tore his ACL at the beginning of training camp. He started alongside Preston Brown and starting outside linebackers Jerry Hughes and Lorenzo Alexander.

External videos
- Week 4: Zach Brown Highlights
- Zach Brown forces fumble by Jacoby Brissett

He started the Buffalo Bills' season-opener at the Baltimore Ravens and recorded eight combined tackles during their 13–7 loss. On October 2, 2016, Brown collected a career-high 17 combined tackles (12 solo) and made one sack in the Bills' 16–0 victory at the New England Patriots in Week 4. On December 11, 2016, Brown made seven solo tackles, a pass deflection, and intercepted a pass by Steelers' quarterback Ben Roethlisberger during a 27–20 loss against the Pittsburgh Steelers in Week 14. On December 20, 2016, it was announced that Brown was selected to be an alternate for the 2017 Pro Bowl. On December 27, 2016, the Buffalo Bills announced their decision to fire head coach Rex Ryan after the Bills finished the season with a 7–9 record and did not qualify for the playoffs. Assistant head coach and running backs coach Anthony Lynn was named the interim head coach for the Bills' final game. Brown started in all 16 games for the first time of his career and recorded a career-high 149 combined tackles (97 solo), four pass deflections, four sacks, two forced fumbles, and one interception. Brown finished the season with the second most tackles among all players, behind Bobby Wagner who had 167 combined tackles. On January 23, 2017, it was announced by the NFL that Brown was selected to play in the 2017 Pro Bowl as a late replacement for New England Patriots' linebacker Dont'a Hightower.

Brown became an unrestricted free agent in 2017 and was considered a top free agent linebacker by NFL analysts. He met with multiple teams, including the Oakland Raiders, Miami Dolphins, Washington Redskins, and Buffalo Bills. The Buffalo Bills were interested in re-signing Brown, but would later withdraw their contract offer.

=== Washington Redskins ===
==== 2017 ====
On April 3, 2017, the Washington Redskins signed Brown to a one-year, $2.30 million contract that includes $700,000 guaranteed and a signing bonus of $500,000. Brown entered training camp slated as a starting inside linebacker. Head coach Jay Gruden named Brown and Mason Foster the starting inside linebackers to begin the regular season. They started alongside outside linebackers Ryan Kerrigan and Preston Smith.

On October 23, 2017, Brown collected a season-high 13 combined tackles (ten solo) and made a season-high 1.5 sacks during a 34–24 loss at the Philadelphia Eagles in Week 7. On December 10, 2017, Brown made ten combined tackles (five solo), but was carted off the field in the fourth quarter of the Redskins’ 30–13 loss at the Los Angeles Chargers due to a foot injury. Brown was sidelined for the last three games of the regular season (Weeks 15–17). Brown finished the season with 127 combined tackles (84 solo), 2.5 sacks, and two pass deflections in 13 games and 13 starts.

==== 2018 ====
External videos
- Zachary Brown stuffs Josh Adams for loss on fourth and goal

On March 15, 2018, the Washington Redskins signed Brown signed a three-year, $24 million contract that includes $10 million guaranteed and a signing bonus of $4.50 million. Head coach Jay Gruden retained Brown, Foster, Kerrigan, and Smith as the starting linebackers in 2018. On December 30, 2018, Brown recorded a season-high 11 combined tackles (nine solo) as the Redskins lost 24–0 against the Philadelphia Eagles in Week 17. He finished the 2018 NFL season with 96 combined tackles (69 solo), one sack, and one pass deflection in 16 games and 12 starts. Brown received an overall grade of 89.2 from Pro Football Focus in 2018. His grade was the third best grade among all qualified linebackers during the season.

On March 13, 2019, Brown was released by the Redskins.

=== Philadelphia Eagles ===
On May 3, 2019, Brown signed a one-year, $3 million contract with the Philadelphia Eagles. He was released on October 14, after starting the first six games of the season for them.

=== Arizona Cardinals ===
On November 1, 2019, Brown was signed by the Arizona Cardinals, but was released five days later.

== NFL career statistics ==
Legend
**Bold**	Career high

Year	Team	Games		Tackles					Interceptions					Fumbles			
Year	Team	GP	GS	Cmb	Solo	Ast	Sck	TFL	Int	Yds	TD	Lng	PD	FF	FR	Yds	TD
2012	TEN	**16**	14	93	68	25	**5.5**	11	**3**	**156**	**2**	**79**	**5**	1	**2**	**6**	0
2013	TEN	**16**	13	91	72	19	4.0	9	1	3	0	3	**5**	1	1	0	0
2014	TEN	1	1	0	0	0	0.0	0	0	0	0	0	0	0	0	0	0
2015	TEN	**16**	5	77	55	22	0.5	4	2	45	0	45	3	0	0	0	0
2016	BUF	**16**	**16**	**149**	**97**	**52**	4.0	11	1	0	0	0	4	**2**	0	0	0
2017	WAS	13	13	127	84	43	2.5	**12**	0	0	0	0	2	0	0	0	0
2018	WAS	**16**	12	96	69	27	1.0	10	0	0	0	0	1	**2**	0	0	0
2019	PHI	6	6	31	17	14	0.0	2	0	0	0	0	2	0	0	0	0
		100	80	664	462	202	17.5	59	7	204	2	79	22	6	3	6	0
