= Jason McCourty =

American football player (born 1987)

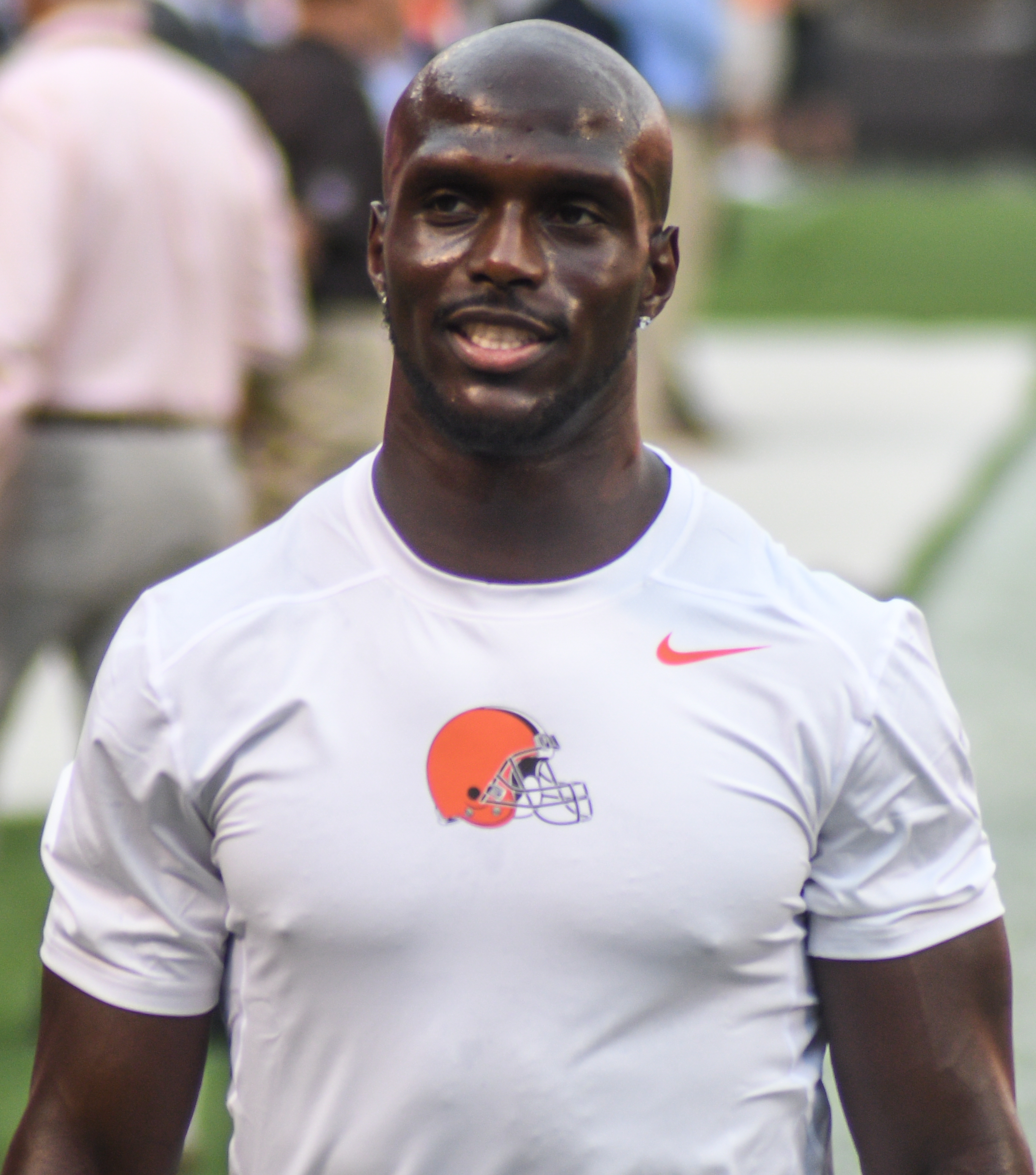
- McCourty with the Cleveland Browns in 2017

No. 30
- Position: Cornerback

Personal information
- Born: August 13, 1987 (age 39); Nyack, New York, U.S.
- Listed height: 5 ft 11 in (1.80 m)
- Listed weight: 195 lb (88 kg)

Career information
- High school: Saint Joseph Regional (Montvale, New Jersey)
- College: Rutgers (2005–2008)
- NFL draft: 2009: 6th round, 203rd overall pick

Career history
- Tennessee Titans (2009–2016); Cleveland Browns (2017); New England Patriots (2018–2020); Miami Dolphins (2021)

Awards and highlights
- Super Bowl champion (LIII)

Career NFL statistics
- Total tackles: 744
- Sacks: 1.0
- Forced fumbles: 9
- Fumble recoveries: 5
- Pass deflections: 108
- Interceptions: 18
- Touchdowns: 2
- Stats at Pro Football Reference

Jason McCourty (born August 13, 1987) is an American former professional football player who was a cornerback for 13 seasons in the National Football League (NFL). He played college football for the Rutgers Scarlet Knights and was selected by the Tennessee Titans in the sixth round of the 2009 NFL draft. McCourty also played in the NFL for the Cleveland Browns, the New England Patriots (with whom he won Super Bowl LIII), and ended his playing career with the Miami Dolphins. He primarily played cornerback throughout his first 11 NFL seasons, but moved to free safety while playing for the Miami Dolphins in 2021. His twin brother, Devin, also played in the NFL. In 2022, McCourty was hired by NFL Network to serve as an analyst on Good Morning Football, and by Westwood One to help call select Thursday Night Football radio broadcasts. In late 2023, he was providing color commentary for college football telecasts on CBS.

== College career ==
Jason McCourty started three years as a cornerback for Rutgers University. He ended his college career with 148 tackles, 2 interceptions, 20 pass breakups and finished second in the Big East in kickoff returns as a senior. His twin brother, Devin, started alongside him as a cornerback at Rutgers. McCourty graduated with a bachelor's degree in information technology.

== Professional career ==
=== Pre-draft ===
Coming out of Rutgers, McCourty was not a highly sought after prospect and did not receive an invitation to the NFL Combine. On March 23, 2009, he participated at Rutgers' pro day, along with Kenny Britt, Mike Teel, Tiquan Underwood, Courtney Greene, Kevin Brock, Kevin Malast, and nine other teammates. 41 team representatives and scouts from 27 NFL teams attended Rutgers pro day to scout one of the most talented teams in school history. McCourty ran the fastest time of any player there in the 40-yard dash.

Pre-draft measurables
Height	Weight	Arm length	Hand span	40-yard dash	10-yard split	20-yard split	20-yard shuttle	Three-cone drill	Vertical jump	Broad jump	Bench press
5 ft 10 3/8 in (1.79 m)	193 lb (88 kg)	31 1/4 in (0.79 m)	9 1/8 in (0.23 m)	4.32 s	1.44 s	2.49 s	4.28 s	6.68 s	36.5 in (0.93 m)	10 ft 5 in (3.18 m)	15 reps
All values from Rutger's Pro Day

=== Tennessee Titans ===
==== 2009 ====
The Tennessee Titans selected McCourty in the sixth round (203rd overall) of the 2009 NFL draft. He was the second player from Rutgers that the Tennessee Titans drafted after first-rounder Kenny Britt who was the 31st pick drafted in the 2009 draft. He was the 31st cornerback drafted and the third of five players from Rutgers selected in 2009.

On June 23, 2009, the Tennessee Titans signed McCourty to a four—year, $1.84 million rookie contract that included a signing bonus of $89,818.

He entered training camp as a backup and competed for a roster spot as the third cornerback on the depth chart against Ryan Mouton, Cary Williams, and DeMarcus Faggins. Head coach Jeff Fisher named McCourty a backup and listed him as the fourth cornerback on the depth chart to start the regular season, behind Cortland Finnegan, Nick Harper, and Cary Williams. Defensive coordinator Jim Schwartz elected to have safety Vincent Fuller as the starting nickelback.

On September 10, 2009, McCourty made his professional regular season debut in the Titans' season-opener at the Pittsburgh Steelers and made one tackle for-a-loss as they lost 10–13. In Week 3, he recorded three solo tackles and had three kick returns for 72–yards during a 24–27 loss at the New York Jets. McCourty was only used as a kick returner for this game after Javon Ringer was benched and replaced by Ryan Mouton who had two fumbles. During their loss at the Jets, starting cornerback Cortland Finnegan injured his right hamstring and nickelback Vincent Fuller broke his arm. On September 29, 2009, the Titans signed Cary Williams to the practice squad in order to sign Mark Jones to takeover kick returns. Following the decision to cut Cary Williams from the active roster and injuries to both Cortland Finnegan and Vincent Fuller, the Titans were left with three cornerbacks on their active roster entering Week 4. Head coach Jeff Fisher named McCourty the No. 2 starting cornerback alongside Nick Harper with fellow rookie Ryan Mouton as the starting nickelback.

On October 4, 2009, McCourty earned his first career start and recorded five solo tackles during a 37–17 loss at the Jacksonville Jaguars. In Week 5, he received his second start and set a season-high with eight combined tackles (six solo) during their 31–9 loss against the Indianapolis Colts. During the third quarter, starting cornerback Nick Harper sustained an injury and immediately walked off the field into the locker room with trainers accompanying him. The following day, it was confirmed that Nick Harper had broken his arm and would have to undergo surgery that would sideline him for up to six weeks. On October 18, 2009, McCourty and Ryan Mouton were forced to start at the New England Patriots and Tom Brady had a career-high six touchdown passes during the Titans' 59–0 loss. The Titans signed free agent Roderick Hood to takeover as a starting cornerback in Week 8 alongside a returning Cortland Finnegan. He was inactive as the Titans defeated the Buffalo Bills 41–17 in Week 10. He finished his rookie season with only 30 combined tackles (25 solo) in 15 games and three starts.

==== 2010 ====
Entering training camp, the role as the No. 2 starting cornerback was left vacant after Nick Harper ended the season on injured reserve after breaking his forearm again and Roderick Hood suffered a torn ACL in June, requiring surgery after the Titans re-signed him on March 19, 2010. Among the candidates to become the No. 2 starting cornerback, defensive coordinator Chuck Cecil had McCourty, Ryan Mouton, Tye Hill, and rookie Alterraun Verner. Head coach Jeff Fisher named McCourty the starting cornerback, alongside Cortland Finnegan, to start the regular season.

On September 12, 2010, McCourty started in the Tennessee Titans' season-opener against the Oakland Raiders and set a season-high with eight combined tackles (three solo) and had one pass deflection in their 38–13 victory. On September 26, 2010, McCourty made four combined tackles (one solo), one pass deflection, and had his first career interception on a pass thrown by Eli Manning into the endzone to tight end Kevin Boss before exiting in the fourth quarter of the 29–10 victory at the New York Giants with an arm injury. On September 28, 2010, McCourty underwent surgery to repair his broken right forearm and was sidelined for the next four games (Weeks 4–7).

Upon his return entering Week 8, McCourty was listed as the fourth cornerback on the depth chart behind Cortland Finnegan, Tim Shaw, and rookie Alterraun Verner. In Week 8, he recorded three solo tackles, made a pass deflection, and intercepted a pass attempt by Philip Rivers to wide receiver Seyi Ajirotutu during a 33–25 loss at the San Diego Chargers. The following week, McCourty would surpass Tim Shaw in the depth chart and remained the starting nickelback for the last four games of the season. He finished the season with 47 combined tackles (37 solo), ten pass deflections, and two interceptions in 12 games and six starts.

==== 2011 ====
On January 28, 2011, the Tennessee Titans fired head coach Jeff Fisher ending a 16—year tenure after they finished with a 6–10 record. Due to the 2011 NFL lockout, NFL training camps did not begin until late July. Throughout training camp, McCourty competed against Alterraun Verner to be the No. 2 starting cornerback. Head coach Mike Munchak named McCourty and Cortland Finnegan the starting cornerbacks to begin the season.

On September 11, 2011, McCourty started in the Tennessee Titans' season-opener at the Jacksonville Jaguars and made five solo tackles, one pass deflection, and forced a fumble while making the first sack of his career on Luke McCown for an eight–yard loss during a 14–16 loss. In Week 2, he recorded four solo tackles, had one pass break-up, and intercepted a pass thrown by Joe Flacco to tight end Ed Dickson during a 26–13 victory against the Baltimore Ravens. The following week, he made six combined tackles (five solo), one pass deflection, and intercepted a pass for the second game in-a-row that was thrown by Kyle Orton to wide receiver Eric Decker as the Titans defeated the Denver Broncos 14–17. In Week 4, he set a season-high ten solo tackles during a 31–13 victory at the Cleveland Browns. On October 9, 2011, McCourty set a season-high with 14 combined tackles (eight solo) and had one pass deflection during a 38–17 loss at the Pittsburgh Steelers. In Week 13, McCourty recorded two solo tackles before he exited during the first quarter of a 23–17 victory at the Buffalo Bills after he was injured while both he and linebacker Akeem Ayers both tackled wide receiver Lee Evans. McCourty laid prone on the field after the play, but was able to walk to the sideline unassisted before trainers escorted him to the locker room. He was confirmed to have sustained a concussion and was inactive during a 17–22 loss to the New Orleans Saints in Week 14. He finished the season with a career-high 103 combined tackles (83 solo), 13 pass deflections, two interceptions, a sack, and a forced fumble in 15 games and 15 starts.

==== 2012 ====
On August 23, 2012, the Tennessee Titans signed McCourty to a six—year, $43.04 million contract extension that includes $17.00 million guaranteed and an initial signing bonus of $9.00 million.

He entered training camp slated as the de facto No. 1 starting cornerback following the departure of Cortland Finnegan. Alterraun Verner and Tommie Campbell competed to start alongside him. Defensive coordinator Jerry Gray named McCourty and Alterraun Verner as the starting cornerbacks to begin the season, alongside Ryan Mouton as the starting nickelback.

On October 11, 2012, McCourty made five combined tackles (two solo), one pass deflection, a fumble recovery, and also intercepted a pass attempt thrown by Ben Roethlisberger to wide receiver Antonio Brown during a 23–26 win against the Pittsburgh Steelers. In Week 7, McCourty recorded six combined tackles (three solo), made a pass deflection, and led the Titans to a 35–34 late fourth quarter comeback victory at the Buffalo Bills by intercepting a pass attempt by Ryan Fitzpatrick to wide receiver Donald Jones with 3:03 remaining with the Titans down 28–34. His interception led to the game-winning touchdown for the Titans after quarterback Matt Hasselbeck threw a 15–yard touchdown pass to wide receiver Nate Washington with 1:03 remaining.

In Week 10, he set a season-high with nine solo tackles and made one pass deflection as the Titans' routed the Miami Dolphins 37–3. On December 17, 2012, McCourty made five combined tackles (three solo), two pass deflections, and set a career-high with two interceptions on passes tny Mark Sanchez during a 14–10 victory against the New York Jets. His fourth interception of the season occurred in the second quarter on a pass attempt by Mark Sanchez to tight end Jeff Cumberland. In Week 17, McCourty recorded seven combined tackles (six solo) and set a season-high with four pass deflections during a 38–20 victory against the Jacksonville Jaguars. He started all 16 games throughout the 2012 NFL season and had a total of 92 combined tackles (73 solo), a career-high 15 pass deflections, and four interceptions in 16 games and 16 starts.

==== 2013 ====
He returned to training camp as the No. 1 starting cornerback as defensive coordinator Jerry Gray held a competition between Alterraun Verner and Tommie Campbell for the role as the No. 2 starting cornerback. Head coach Mike Munchak named McCourty the No. 1 starting cornerback to begin the season, alongside Alterraun Verner and Coty Sensabaugh at nickelback.

On October 13, 2013, McCourty made a season-high nine combined tackles (seven solo), z forced fumble, and scored the first touchdown of his career during a 10–13 loss.at the Seattle Seahawks. His touchdown occurred two seconds before halftime during a field goal attempt by punter Jon Ryan who was filling in for kicker Stephen Hauschka after he exited the game with a concussion. Safety Chris Maragos filled in for Jon Ryan as the holder and botched the snap to recover the ball and had it stripped by Michael Griffin as he was attempting to throw the ball out-of-bounds. McCourty would recover the loose ball and returned it 77–yards for the first touchdown of his career. He started all 16 games in 2013 and made 65 combined tackles (54 solo), 11 pass deflections, one forced fumble, a fumble recovery, and scored one touchdown.

==== 2014 ====
On January 4, 2014, the Tennessee Titans fired head coach Mike Munchak after finishing with a 7–9 record and two consecutive losing seasons. He entered training camp slated as the de facto No. 1 starting cornerback under new defensive coordinator Ray Horton following the departure Alterraun Verner to the Tampa Bay Buccaneers in free agency. Head coach Ken Whisenhunt retained McCourty as the No. 1 starting cornerback to begin the season and paired him with Blidi Wreh-Wilson with Coty Sensabaugh remaining as the starting nickelback.

On September 7, 2014, McCourty started in the Tennessee Titans' season-opener at the Kansas City Chiefs and recorded three solo tackles, made two pass deflections, and set a season-high with two interceptions off passes by Alex Smith during their 26–10 victory. In Week 6, he set a season-high with 11 combined tackles (ten solo) and made a pass deflection in the Titans' 16–14 win against the Jacksonville Jaguars. In Week 11, McCourty recorded seven solo tackles, made a pass deflection, and intercepted a pass by Ben Roethlisberger to wide receiver Antonio Brown during a 27–24 loss to the Pittsburgh Steelers. He started all 16 games for the second consecutive season and recorded 85 combined tackles (77 solo), 11 pass deflections, and made three interceptions.

==== 2015 ====
On August 24, 2015, McCourty underwent surgery on his groin after he was unable to physically participate in training camp the last two weeks. He missed the entire preseason and was expected to probably miss their Week 1 season-opener. He remained inactive for the first three games (Weeks 1–3) of the season due to his groin injury. During his absence, head coach Ken Whisenhunt started Perrish Cox, Coty Sensabaugh, and Blidi Wreh-Wilson. McCourty was named a co-defensive captain during the 2015 season.

Upon his return in Week 4, McCourty took back his as the No. 1 starting cornerback and started alongside Perish Cox. In Week 8, McCourty set a season-high seven combined tackles (five solo) during the Titans' 20–6 loss at the Houston Texans. On November 4, 2015, the Tennessee Titans fired head coach Ken Whisenhunt after a 1–6 start and appointed Mike Mularkey to interim head coach. On November 16, 2015, the Titans officially placed McCourty on season-ending injured reserve after he re-injured his groin and underwent surgery four days later. He would remain inactive for the last nine games (Weeks 9–17) of the season. He finished the 2015 season with 15 combined tackles (ten solo) in four games and four starts.

==== 2016 ====
He returned to trained camp as the No. 1 starting cornerback under defensive coordinator Dick LeBeau. Perish Cox and Brice McCain competed with one another to start opposite McCourty. Head coach Mike Mularkey named McCourty and Perrish Cox the starting cornerbacks to start the season with Brice McCain as the nickelback.

In Week 4, McCourty recorded four combined tackles (three solo), made one pass deflection, and an intercepted Brock Osweiler ok a pass to DeAndre Hopkins during a 27–20 loss at the Houston Texans. The following week, he made two solo tackles, one pass deflection, and picked off a pass by Ryan Tannehill to DeVante Parker during a 30–17 victory at the Miami Dolphins in Week 5. On October 27, 2016, McCourty set a season-high with 11 combined tackles (eight solo) and made two pass deflections in their 36–22 win against the Jacksonville Jaguars. In Week 15, McCourty suffered an injury to his chest on his second snap on defense, exiting in the first quarter of a 19–17 victory at the Kansas City Chiefs and would remain inactive for the last two games (Weeks 16–17) of the season. He finished the 2016 season with 69 combined tackles (60 solo), 12 pass deflections, and two interceptions in 14 games and 14 starts.

On April 13, 2017, the Tennessee Titans officially released McCourty after eight seasons with the team, after they were unable to reach an agreement on a restructured contract or a pay cut. At the time, the McCourty still had one season remaining in the six—year contract signed in 2012. McCourty became expendable to the Titans after signing signed free agent Logan Ryan in March and also had a deep group of cornerbacks to choose from in the upcoming NFL draft. They went on to select Adoree' Jackson in the first round (18th overall) of the 2017 NFL draft.

=== Cleveland Browns ===
On May 16, 2017, the Cleveland Browns signed McCourty to a two—year, $6 million contract that included $2 million guaranteed and a signing bonus of $1.25 million. He was reunited with defensive coordinator Gregg Williams who had previously been an assistant coach with the Tennessee Titans in 2013.

Throughout training camp, he competed against Joe Haden, Jamar Taylor, and Briean Boddy-Calhoun for a role as a starting cornerback. Head coach Hue Jackson named him the starting cornerback, alongside Jamar Taylor, after the Browns released Joe Haden.

On September 17, 2017, McCourty made four combined tackles (three solo), set a season-high with two pass deflections, forced a fumble, and had his first interception with the Browns, picking off a pass by Joe Flacco to wide receiver Mike Wallace during a' 24–10 loss at the Baltimore Ravens. On October 15, 2017, McCourty made one tackle, a pass deflection, and had the first pick-six of his career after intercepting a pass attempt by Deshaun Watson to wide receiver Will Fuller to return it 56–yards for a touchdown during a 33–17 loss at the Houston Texans. He was inactive for two consecutive games (Weeks 7–8) after he suffered an ankle injury. In Week 13, McCourty set a season-high with nine solo tackles and also had one pass break-up as the Browns lost 10–19 at the Los Angeles Chargers. On December 10, 2017, he set a season-high with ten combined tackles (eight solo) during a 27–21 loss to the Green Bay Packers. He finished the 2017 season with 69 combined tackles (60 solo), 12 pass deflections, two interceptions, and a touchdown in 14 games and 14 starts. Despite Jason's efforts, the 2017 Cleveland Browns became the second team in NFL history to finish 0–16 after the 2008 Detroit Lions.

=== New England Patriots ===
==== 2018 ====
On March 15, 2018, the Cleveland Browns traded McCourty to the New England Patriots, along with a seventh-round pick (219th overall) in the 2018 NFL draft in return for the Patriots 2018 sixth-round pick (205th overall). He joined his twin brother Devin McCourty who was entering his eighth season with the Patriots.

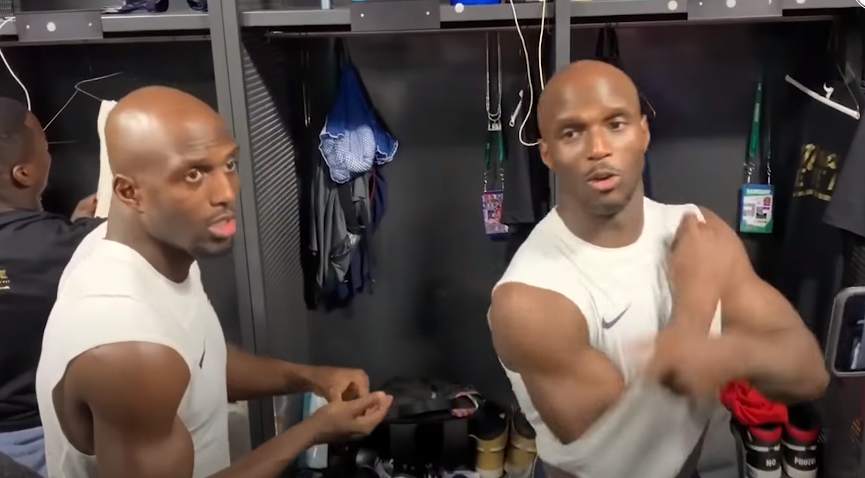
Jason with his twin Devin after winning Super Bowl LIII

Although Duron Harmon wore No. 30 throughout his career with the Patriots for five seasons, he made the decision to switch his jersey number from No. 30 to No. 21 to accommodate McCourty as he had also donned No.30 for nine seasons. McCourty (2006–2008) and Harmon (2009–2012) had both played under Greg Schiano at Rutgers. Throughout training camp, McCourty competed against Eric Rowe to be the No. 2 starting cornerback following the departure of Malcolm Butler. named McCourty a backup and listed him as the third cornerback on the depth chart to begin the season, behind starting duo Stephon Gilmore and Eric Rowe.

On September 16, 2018, McCourty was inserted into the game in the first quarter to replace Eric Rowe after he was benched after giving up three receptions for 20 yards and a touchdown. He recorded six solo tackles as the Patriots lost 31–20 at the Jacksonville Jaguars. He remained the No. 2 starting cornerback for the majority of the season, but lost his starting role to undrafted rookie J. C. Jackson in Week 16. In Week 15, he set a season-high with nine combined tackles (seven solo) during a 10–17 loss at the Pittsburgh Steelers. On December 23, 2018, McCourty made three solo tackles, two pass deflections, and sealed a 12–24 victory against the Buffalo Bills when he intercepted a pass by Josh Allen to wide receiver Isaiah McKenzie with 4:07 remaining in the game. It became his first interception with the Patriots as well as his only one of the season. He finished the season with 70 combined tackles (54 solo), ten pass deflections, and made one interception in 16 games and 12 starts.

The New England Patriots finished first in the AFC East with a 11-5 record to clinch a first-round bye. On January 13, 2019, McCourty started in the first playoff game appearance of his career and recorded five solo tackles and one pass deflection during a 28–41 win against the Los Angeles Chargers in the Divisional Round. The following week, he started in the AFC Championship Game as the Patriots had a 37–31 overtime victory at the Kansas City Chiefs. On February 3, 2019, McCourty started in Super Bowl LIII and recorded five combined tackles (four solo) and made two pass deflections as the Patriots defeated the Los Angeles Rams 13–3. Late in the third quarter, McCourty broke up a pass by Jared Goff while covering wide receiver Brandin Cooks tightly in the endzone to prevent a 34-yard touchdown as the Patriots led 3–0. Patriots' head coach Bill Belichick called the play by McCourty "huge” as it was a crucial play to prevent the Rams leading 3–7. The drive ended with a 53–yard field goal by Rams kicker Greg Zuerlein to tie the game 3–3 after linebacker Dont'a Hightower had a nine–yard sack on Jared Goff on third down.

==== 2019 ====
On March 13, 2019, the New England Patriots re–signed McCourty to a two—year, $10 million contract extension that included $5.50 million guaranteed and an initial signing bonus of $3.50 million. Throughout training camp, he competed to earn the role as the No. 2 starting cornerback against Jonathan Jones and J. C. Jackson. Head coach Bill Belichick named him and Stephon Gilmore the starting cornerbacks to begin the season.

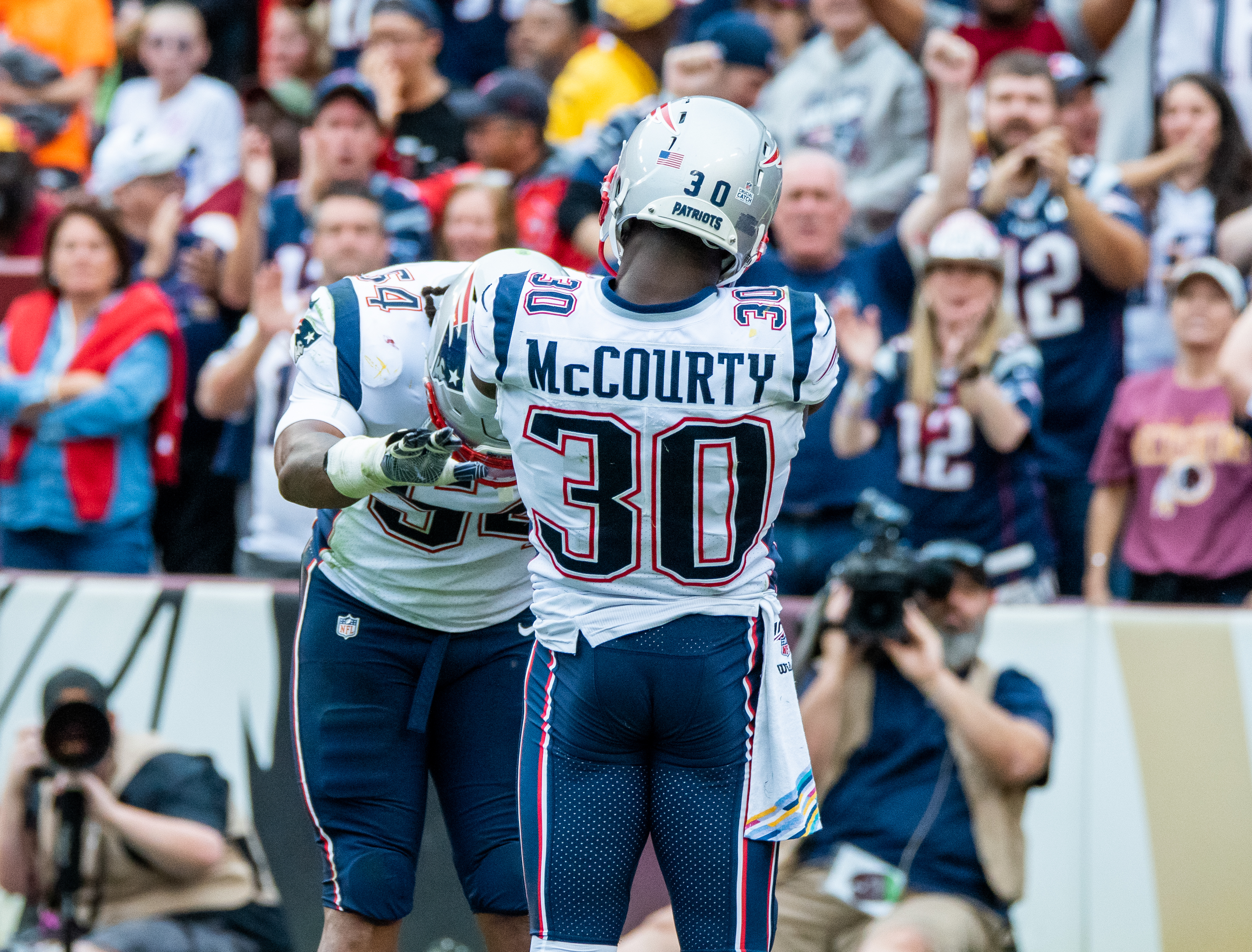
McCourty in a game against the Washington Redskins

On September 8, 2019, McCourty started in the New England Patriots' home-opener against the Pittsburgh Steelers and recorded seven combined tackles (six solo) and set a season-high with three pass deflections as they won 3–33. In Week 5, he tied his season-high of seven combined tackles (six solo), made one pass deflection, and had his first and only interception of the season on a pass Colt McCoy threw to Steven Sims during a 33–7 win at the Washington Redskins. He suffered an injury to his groin and was inactive for two games (Weeks 12–13). He would miss another two games (Weeks 15 and 17) due to his groin injury reoccurring. He finished the season with 40 combined tackles (31 solo), six pass deflections, and made one interception in 12 games and ten starts.

==== 2020 ====
He entered training camp projected to retain his role as the No. 2 starting cornerback, but was expected to have competition for the role from J. C. Jackson. He began the season as a starting cornerback alongside Stephon Gilmore and nickelback Jonathan Jones. Jason and his twin brother Devin McCourty were both selected as team captains for 2020. On October 5, 2020, he set a season-high with five combined tackles (three solo) during a 10–26 loss at the Kansas City Chiefs. Beginning in Week 8, McCourty was moved to nickelback and was replaced by J. C. Jackson as the No. 2 starting cornerback for the remainder of the season. He finished with 42 total tackles (30 solo) and three passes defended in 16 games and 11 starts.

=== Miami Dolphins ===
On May 7, 2021, the Miami Dolphins signed McCourty to a one—year, $1.21 million contract that included $987,500 guaranteed and a signing bonus of $137,500. He was reunited with head coach Brian Flores who was the Patriots' linebackers coach the previous season. He began the season as the starting nickelback and was listed as the third cornerback on the depth chart, behind Xavien Howard and Byron Jones. On October 26, 2021, the Miami Dolphins officially placed him on injured reserve for the remainder of the season due to a foot injury. . In the 2021 season, he appeared in seven games and started four. He finished with 21 total tackles (ten solo) and two passes defended.

On July 15, 2022, McCourty officially announced his retirement after 12 seasons. His twin brother Devin would retire after the 2022 NFL season.

== NFL career statistics ==
Legend
	Won the Super Bowl
**Bold**	Career high

=== Regular season ===
Year	Team	Games		Tackles				Interceptions						Fumbles			
Year	Team	GP	GS	Cmb	Solo	Ast	Sck	Int	Yds	Avg	Lng	TD	PD	FF	FR	Yds	TD
2009	TEN	15	3	30	25	5	0.0	0	0	0.0	0	0	0	1	0	0	0
2010	TEN	12	6	47	37	10	0.0	2	11	5.5	11	0	10	0	0	0	0
2011	TEN	15	15	**103**	**83**	**20**	**1.0**	2	52	**26.0**	30	0	13	1	**1**	0	0
2012	TEN	16	16	92	73	19	0.0	**4**	29	7.3	28	0	**15**	1	**1**	0	0
2013	TEN	16	16	65	54	11	0.0	0	0	0.0	0	0	11	1	**1**	**77**	**1**
2014	TEN	16	16	85	77	8	0.0	3	0	0.0	0	0	11	**2**	**1**	62	**1**
2015	TEN	4	4	15	10	5	0.0	0	0	0.0	0	0	1	0	0	0	0
2016	TEN	14	14	69	60	9	0.0	2	7	3.5	6	0	12	0	**1**	0	0
2017	CLE	14	14	65	54	11	0.0	3	**59**	19.7	**56T**	**1**	14	**2**	0	0	0
2018	NE	16	12	70	54	16	0.0	1	0	0.0	0	0	10	1	0	0	0
2019	NE	12	10	40	31	9	0.0	1	16	16.0	16	0	6	0	0	0	0
2020	NE	16	11	42	30	12	0.0	0	0	0.0	0	0	3	0	0	0	0
2021	MIA	7	4	21	10	11	0.0	0	0	0.0	0	0	2	0	0	0	0
Career		173	141	744	598	146	1.0	18	174	9.7	56	1	108	9	5	139	2

== Personal life ==
McCourty's identical twin brother, Devin McCourty, was a Pro Bowl safety for the New England Patriots for 13 years. They are one of only 13 sets of twins in NFL history. They were the first set to play in a Super Bowl together, as well as the first to win one, doing so in Super Bowl LIII.

Jason and Devin McCourty jointly delivered the 2019 commencement address at Rutgers; they also received honorary doctorates from their alma mater.

Jason is married to Melissa McCourty and the couple have three children.
