= Colin McCarthy =

American football player (born 1988)

No. 52
- Position: Linebacker

Personal information
- Born: May 30, 1988 (age 38); Birdsboro, Pennsylvania, U.S.
- Listed height: 6 ft 1 in (1.85 m)
- Listed weight: 243 lb (110 kg)

Career information
- High school: Clearwater (FL) Central Catholic
- College: Miami (FL)
- NFL draft: 2011: 4th round, 109th overall pick

Career history
- Tennessee Titans (2011–2014)

Awards and highlights
- Second-team All-ACC (2009)

Career NFL statistics
- Total tackles: 161
- Forced fumbles: 3
- Fumble recoveries: 2
- Interceptions: 3
- Defensive touchdowns: 1
- Stats at Pro Football Reference

Colin McCarthy (born May 30, 1988) is an American former professional football player who was a linebacker in the National Football League (NFL). He played college football for the Miami Hurricanes after graduating from Clearwater Central Catholic High School. He was considered one of the better linebacker prospects for the 2011 NFL draft.

== Professional career ==
Pre-draft measurables
Height	Weight	Arm length	Hand span	Wingspan	40-yard dash	10-yard split	20-yard split	20-yard shuttle	Three-cone drill	Vertical jump	Broad jump	Bench press
6 ft 1 3/8 in (1.86 m)	238 lb (108 kg)	29 1/2 in (0.75 m)	10 1/4 in (0.26 m)	6 ft 1 1/2 in (1.87 m)	4.68 s	1.64 s	2.63 s	4.20 s	6.93 s	36.5 in (0.93 m)	9 ft 11 in (3.02 m)	23 reps
All values from NFL Combine

McCarthy was selected in the fourth round with the 109th pick by the Tennessee Titans in the 2011 NFL draft.

McCarthy recorded the first interception of his career when he picked off a pass from Josh Freeman on November 27, 2011. McCarthy was voted the AFC Defensive Player of the Week and Pepsi NFL Rookie of the Week for his performance against the Buffalo Bills on December 4, 2011. McCarthy recorded 9 tackles, 1 forced fumble, and 2 fumble recoveries.

McCarthy missed the entire 2014 season with a dislocated shoulder.

On June 4, 2015, McCarthy announced his retirement from the NFL, at the age of 27.

== NFL career statistics ==
Legend
**Bold**	Career high

Year	Team	Games		Tackles					Interceptions					Fumbles			
Year	Team	GP	GS	Cmb	Solo	Ast	Sck	TFL	Int	Yds	TD	Lng	PD	FF	FR	Yds	TD
2011	TEN	13	**7**	**68**	**54**	14	0.0	**5**	**1**	0	0	0	**3**	**2**	**2**	0	0
2012	TEN	7	**7**	38	25	13	0.0	3	**1**	**49**	**1**	**49**	1	0	0	0	0
2013	TEN	**16**	5	55	38	**17**	0.0	2	**1**	1	0	1	1	1	0	0	0
Career		36	19	161	117	44	0.0	10	3	50	1	49	5	3	2	0	0
