= Taylor Thompson (American football) =

American football player (born 1989)

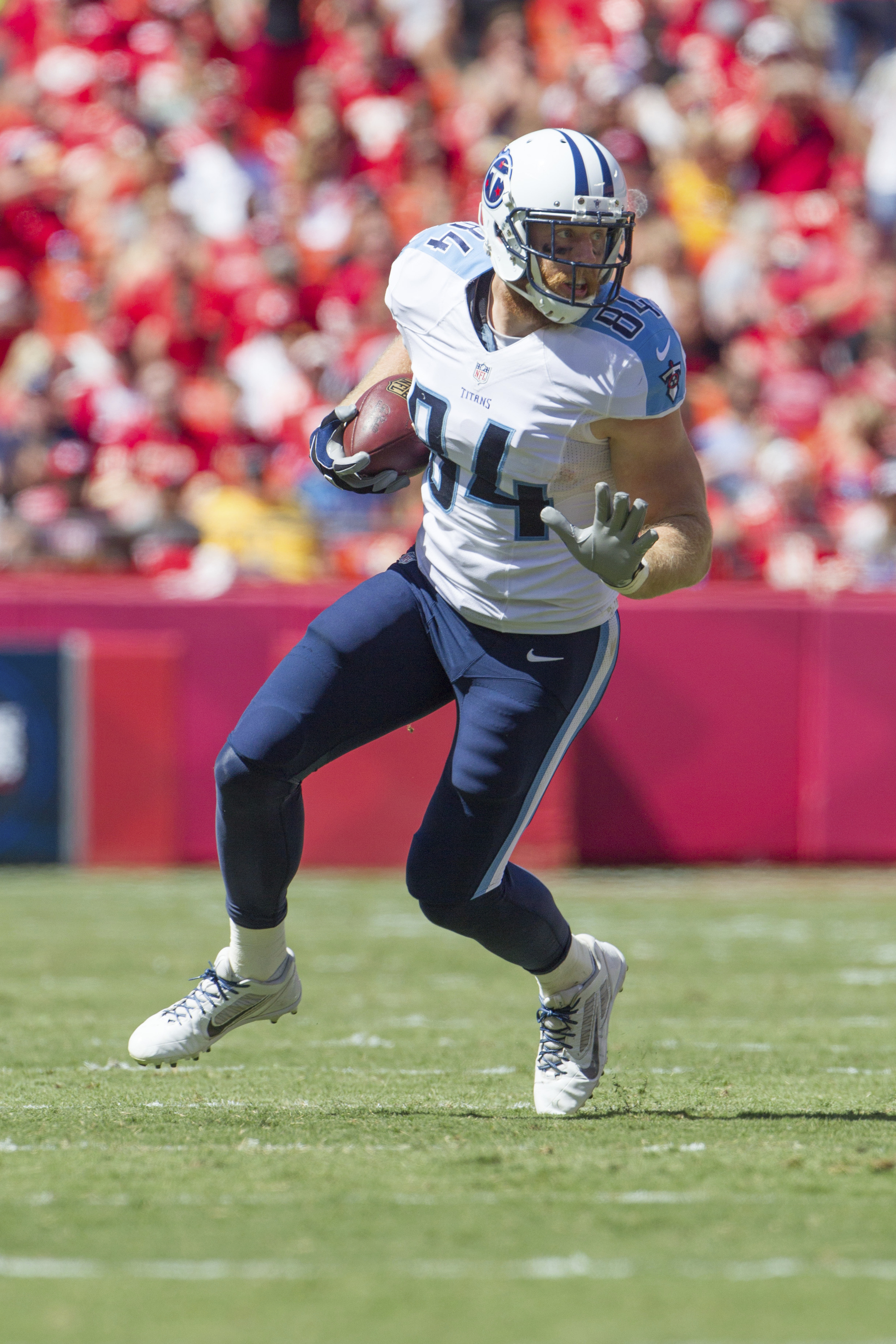
- Thompson with the Tennessee Titans in 2014

No. 84
- Position: Tight end

Personal information
- Born: October 19, 1989 (age 37); Plano, Texas, U.S.
- Listed height: 6 ft 6 in (1.98 m)
- Listed weight: 259 lb (117 kg)

Career information
- High school: Prosper (Prosper, Texas)
- College: Southern Methodist
- NFL draft: 2012: 5th round, 145th overall pick

Career history
- Tennessee Titans (2012–2014)

Awards and highlights
- 2× First-team All-C-USA (2010, 2011)

Career NFL statistics
- Receptions: 11
- Receiving yards: 83
- Receiving average: 7.5
- Receiving touchdowns: 1
- Stats at Pro Football Reference

Taylor Thompson (born October 19, 1989) is an American former professional football player who was a tight end for the Tennessee Titans of the National Football League (NFL). He was selected by the Titans in the fifth round of the 2012 NFL draft. He was released during minicamps on June 18, 2015. He played college football for the SMU Mustangs.

== Early life ==
Thompson attended Prosper High School, where he was a multi-sport athlete excelling in Basketball, Baseball, Track and Football. Following his Junior year, Thompson was rated as a three-star recruit by Rivals.com and Scout.com. His senior year he was selected to the Texas All-State Team, both a Tight end and Defensive end. He was also selected to Dave Campbell's Super Team, ranked as the No. 1 tight end in Texas for the 2008 class, and All-Texas High School Team.

== College career ==
Under head coach June Jones, Thompson was a 4-year starter at SMU. In his Sophomore season, he was awarded honorable mention All-C-USA following the season. He was selected to the First Team All-C-USA his junior and senior year. Thompson is currently ranked 6th all-time at SMU for sacks recorded, with 18.

== Professional career ==
The Tennessee Titans selected Thompson in the fifth round (145th overall). He was the eighth tight end selected during the 2012 NFL draft. Under head coach Mike Munchak, Thompson joined tight ends Craig Stevens and Jared Cook. During his time in Tennessee, Thompson made multiple contributions on offense as well as special teams. In 2014, Thompson received his first NFL touchdown from quarterback Ryan Fitzpatrick. In 2015, the Titans waived Thompson during summer mini-camps following a right knee injury.
