= Tyler Horn =

American football player (born 1989)

No. 69
- Position: Center

Personal information
- Born: March 1, 1989 (age 37)
- Listed height: 6 ft 4 in (1.93 m)
- Listed weight: 305 lb (138 kg)

Career information
- High school: Memphis (TN) University
- College: Miami (FL)
- NFL draft: 2012: undrafted

Career history
- Atlanta Falcons (2012)*; Tennessee Titans (2012)*; Houston Texans (2013)*; Tennessee Titans (2013–2014)*
- * Offseason or practice squad member only
- Stats at Pro Football Reference

Tyler Horn (born March 1, 1989) is an American former football center. He was signed and released in the offseason by the Atlanta Falcons as an undrafted free agent in 2012. He then signed with the Houston Texans during the 2013 NFL offseason, subsequently released. Tyler was then signed by the Tennessee Titans of the National Football League (NFL) as an undrafted free agent in 2013, he was released by the Tennessee Titans in August 2014. He played college football at University of Miami.

== High school ==
Horn attended Memphis University School, helping his high school team win back-to-back state championships when he was a sophomore and junior. He was voted the team's MVP after the 2006 season. Played offensive tackle in high school, as well as center.

== College career ==
In 2007, he joined the Miami Hurricanes and was a redshirt (college football) as a freshman; in his 2009 sophomore year, he played in seven games. As a junior and senior, he started 13 and 12 games respectively in 2010 and 2011. In 2011, he received, Second-team All-ACC Selection and the Walt Kichefski Hurricane Awards in his senior year.

== Professional career ==
Horn has been signed by the Atlanta Falcons, Houston Texans and the Tennessee Titans of the National Football League (NFL), he has yet to make his professional debut in a regular season game.
