= Mike Munchak =

American football player and coach (born 1960)

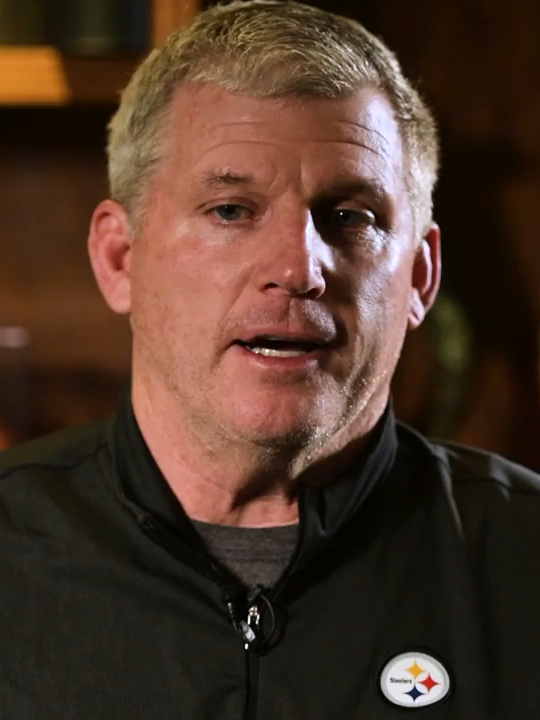
- Munchak with the Pittsburgh Steelers in 2019

No. 63
- Position: Guard

Personal information
- Born: March 5, 1960 (age 66); Scranton, Pennsylvania, U.S.
- Listed height: 6 ft 3 in (1.91 m)
- Listed weight: 281 lb (127 kg)

Career information
- High school: Scranton
- College: Penn State (1978–1981)
- NFL draft: 1982: 1st round, 8th overall pick

Career history

Playing
- Houston Oilers (1982–1993)

Coaching
- Houston Oilers (1994) Offensive assistant coach; Houston Oilers (1995–1996) Offensive quality control coach; Tennessee Oilers / Titans (1997–2010) Offensive line coach; Tennessee Titans (2011–2013) Head coach; Pittsburgh Steelers (2014–2018) Offensive line coach; Denver Broncos (2019–2021) Offensive line coach; Los Angeles Rams (2023–2024) Offensive consultant

Awards and highlights
- As a player: 4× First-team All-Pro (1987–1989, 1991); 5× Second-team All-Pro (1985, 1990, 1992, 1993); 9× Pro Bowl (1984, 1985, 1987–1993); NFL 1980s All-Decade Team; Titans/Oilers Ring of Honor; Tennessee Titans No. 63 retired; First-team All-East (1981); Texas Sports Hall of Fame

Career NFL statistics
- Games played: 159
- Games started: 156
- Fumble recoveries: 5
- Touchdowns: 1
- Stats at Pro Football Reference

Head coaching record
- Career: 22–26 (.458)
- Coaching profile at Pro Football Reference
- Pro Football Hall of Fame

Michael Anthony Munchak (born March 5, 1960) is an American former professional football player and coach. After playing college football for the Penn State Nittany Lions, he played as a guard for the Houston Oilers of the National Football League (NFL) from 1982 to 1993 and was a nine-time Pro Bowl selection. Munchak was inducted into the Pro Football Hall of Fame in 2001.

After his retirement, Munchak continued his association with the Houston franchise by joining the staff as an offensive assistant in 1994. Munchak was named the offensive quality control coach the following year and stayed with the franchise after it moved to Tennessee and became known as the Tennessee Titans, eventually becoming the offensive line coach in 1997 and serving in that position for 14 years.

Munchak became the Titans' head coach in 2011 but was fired after the 2013 season, ending his 31-year association with the franchise. Munchak then served as offensive line coach for the Pittsburgh Steelers from 2014 to 2018 before serving in the same position for the Denver Broncos from 2019 to 2021. He later served as an offensive consultant for the Los Angeles Rams in 2023 and 2024.

== College career ==
Munchak was a guard for Penn State from 1978 to 1981. During this time, he was a starter for the 1979 and 1981 seasons. However, Munchak missed the 1980 season due to a knee injury. As a senior, he was named a second-team All-American.

== Professional playing career ==
During the 1982 NFL draft, Munchak was chosen as the Houston Oilers' first round draft pick (eighth overall), making him the first guard drafted that year. As a rookie, Munchak quickly earned a starting position at the left guard position. He remained in that position for 12 seasons. During that time, Munchak garnered nine Pro Bowl nominations, twice first-team All-Pro, seven All-AFC, and six second-team All-Pro selections. He was also selected for the 1980s All-Decade Team. Munchak's 12-year tenure tied for the second most seasons played with the Oilers.

== Coaching career ==
=== Houston / Tennessee Oilers / Titans ===
In 1994, only a year after retiring as a player, Munchak joined the Oilers staff as an offensive assistant/quality control coach. Three years later, Munchak was named offensive line coach of the newly relocated Tennessee Oilers, a position he held for the next 14 seasons.

Following Jeff Fisher's departure as head coach, Munchak was named head coach of the Titans on February 7, 2011. The 2011 season marked his 30th season with the organization. The 2013 season, Munchak's third as head coach, yielded a 7–9 record. That offseason, franchise CEO Tommy Smith and general manager Ruston Webster requested Munchak to replace at least six assistant coaches. Munchak disagreed with some of these requests and refused to fully enact those changes in his staff. As a result, Munchak was relieved of his position on January 4, 2014.

=== Pittsburgh Steelers ===
Munchak was eventually hired as the offensive line coach for the Pittsburgh Steelers on January 23, 2014, marking his first season since 1982 that Munchak had no involvement (as a player or coach) with the Oilers/Titans franchise.

During a 2015 NFL playoff game against the Cincinnati Bengals, Munchak yanked Bengals player Reggie Nelson's hair, drawing a 15-yard unsportsmanlike conduct penalty. Munchak was subsequently issued a $10,000 fine by the NFL for the incident that was later rescinded after it was determined that the incident was inadvertent.

=== Denver Broncos ===
After being a finalist for the Denver Broncos' head coach position, Munchak was hired to be their offensive line coach on January 14, 2019. He missed the team's Week 8 matchup in 2020 against the Los Angeles Chargers due to COVID-19 protocols.

On February 2, 2022, it was announced that the Broncos would be parting ways with Munchak.

=== Los Angeles Rams ===
Munchak served as a consultant for the Los Angeles Rams in 2023 and 2024. Head coach Sean McVay expressed interest in adding him to the permanent coaching staff at the end of the 2023 season, but Munchak remained in his consulting role the following year.

=== Head coaching record ===
Team	Year	Regular season					Post season			
Team	Year	Won	Lost	Ties	Win %	Finish	Won	Lost	Win %	Result
TEN	2011	9	7	0	.563	2nd in AFC South	–	–	–	–
TEN	2012	6	10	0	.375	3rd in AFC South	–	–	–	–
TEN	2013	7	9	0	.438	2nd in AFC South	–	–	–	–
Total		22	26	0	.458		–	–	–	–

== Honors ==
Munchak was elected to the Pro Football Hall of Fame in 2001, along with Nick Buoniconti, Marv Levy, Jackie Slater, Lynn Swann, Ron Yary, and Jack Youngblood. In June 2003, Munchak was inducted into the National Polish American Sports Hall of Fame.

The street in front of Scranton High School is named for Munchak.

The United Way of Lackawanna, Wayne & Pike has a charity golf tournament named after Munchak. Each year, the tournament is held the last week of June at The Country Club of Scranton in Clarks Summit, Pennsylvania.

== Personal life ==
Munchak and his wife, Marci, have two daughters, Alexandria and Julie.
