= Nate Kaczor =

American football coach (born 1967)

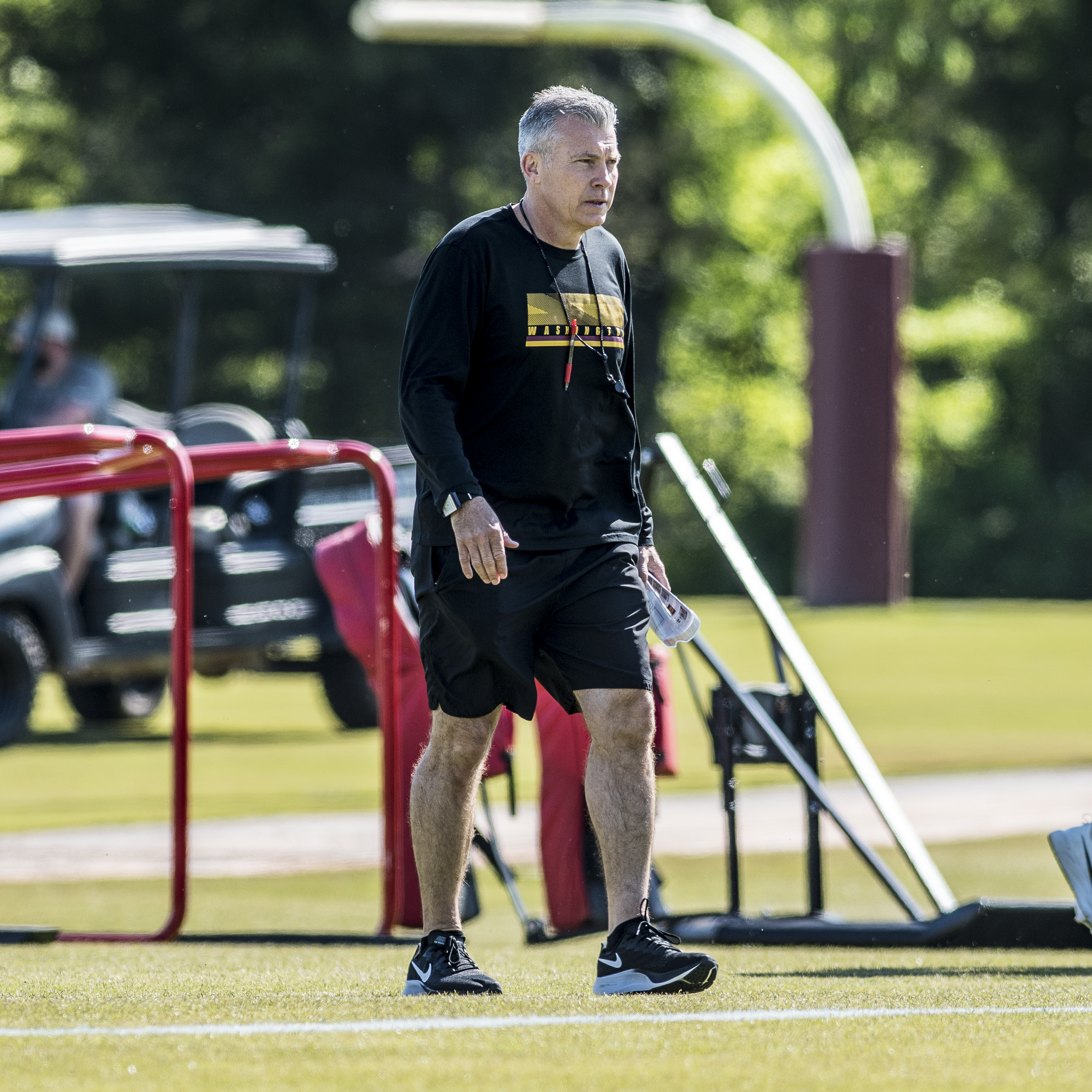
- Kaczor in 2021

Stanford Cardinal
- Title: Special teams coordinator

Personal information
- Born: April 8, 1967 (age 59); Scott City, Kansas, U.S.

Career information
- College: Utah State (1987-1989)

Career history
- Utah State (1991–1999) Offensive assistant; Nebraska-Kearney (2000–2003) Offensive coordinator & quarterbacks coach; Idaho (2004–2005) Co-offensive coordinator & tight ends coach; Louisiana Monroe (2006) Tight ends coach; Louisiana Monroe (2007) Co-offensive coordinator; Jacksonville Jaguars (2008–2011) Assistant special teams coach; Tennessee Titans (2012) Assistant offensive line coach; Tennessee Titans (2013–2015) Special teams coordinator; Tampa Bay Buccaneers (2016–2018) Special teams coordinator; Washington Redskins / Football Team / Commanders (2019–2023) Special teams coordinator; Kansas State (2024–2025) Special teams analyst; Stanford (2026–present) Special teams coordinator

Nate Kaczor (born April 8, 1967) is an American football coach who is a special teams coordinator at Stanford. He previously served as the special teams coordinator for the Tennessee Titans, Tampa Bay Buccaneers, and Washington Commanders.

== Coaching career ==
=== College ===
Kaczor spent 17 years coaching in college and it all started at his alma mater Utah State. He played center for Utah State from 1987 to 1989. In 1991 he began his coaching career as an offensive assistant with them and was in that position until 1999. This was followed by four seasons as the offensive coordinator/quarterbacks coach at Nebraska-Kearney. After this he spent two years with Idaho as the teams co-offensive coordinator and tight ends coach. In 2006 he went to Louisiana-Monroe to be the team's tight ends coach. In 2007 he was promoted to the co-offensive coordinator.

=== Jacksonville Jaguars ===
Kaczor entered the NFL as an assistant special teams coach with the Jacksonville Jaguars from 2008 to 2011.

=== Tennessee Titans ===
Nate would spend four years with the Titans, the first was as an assistant offensive line coach. However starting in 2013 he became the team's special teams coordinator.

=== Tampa Bay Buccaneers ===
Nate spent 2016-2018 with the Tampa Bay Buccaneers as the team's special teams coordinator.

=== Washington Redskins / Football Team / Commanders ===
Kaczor was hired to be the Washington Redskins special teams coordinator in 2019.

=== Kansas State ===
Kaczor joined the Kansas State Wildcats as a special teams analyst in 2024.

=== Stanford ===
Kaczor joined the Stanford Cardinal football team as special teams coordinator in 2026, as part of head coach Tavita Pritchard's inaugural staff.

== Family ==
Kaczor is married and has a son and daughter.
