= Ryan Mouton =

American football player (born 1986)

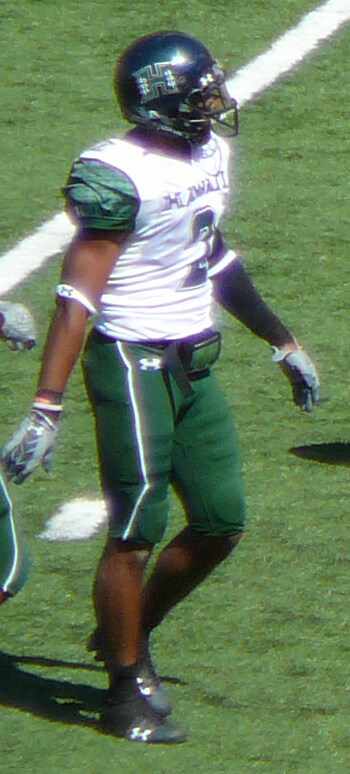
- Mouton with the Hawaii Warriors in 2008

No. 29
- Position: Cornerback

Personal information
- Born: September 23, 1986 (age 40); Houston, Texas, U.S.
- Listed height: 5 ft 9 in (1.75 m)
- Listed weight: 184 lb (83 kg)

Career information
- High school: Katy (TX)
- College: Hawaii
- NFL draft: 2009: 3rd round, 94th overall pick

Career history
- Tennessee Titans (2009−2012); Washington Redskins (2013)*; Washington Redskins (2014)*; Calgary Stampeders (2014)*
- * Offseason or practice squad member only

Career NFL statistics
- Total tackles: 78
- Forced fumbles: 1
- Fumble recoveries: 2
- Pass deflections: 3
- Stats at Pro Football Reference

Ryan Mouton (born September 23, 1986) is an American former professional football player who was a cornerback in the National Football League (NFL). He was selected by the Tennessee Titans in the third round of the 2009 NFL draft. He played college football for the Hawaii Warriors.

== Professional career ==
=== Tennessee Titans ===
Mouton was selected by the Tennessee Titans in the third round of the 2009 NFL draft with the 94th overall pick.

=== Washington Redskins ===
Mouton was signed by the Washington Redskins on July 25, 2013. He was placed on team's injured reserve on August 28, but two days later the Redskins released him with an injury settlement.

Mouton signed a reserve/future contract with the Washington Redskins on December 31, 2013. He was released on April 5, 2014.

=== Calgary Stampeders ===
Mouton was signed to the Calgary Stampeders practice roster on October 13, 2014. He was released by the Stampeders on November 6.
