= Ruston Webster =

American football executive and former player

Atlanta Falcons
- Title: Senior personnel executive

Personal information
- Born: September 30, 1962 (age 64); Houston, Texas, U.S.

Career information
- College: Mississippi

Career history
- Southwestern Louisiana (1985); Graduate assistant; Alabama (1986); Graduate assistant; Tulsa (1987); Graduate assistant; Tampa Bay Buccaneers (1988–2005); Regional college scout (1988); Director of pro personnel (1989–1991); Scout (1992–2000); Director of college scouting (2001–2004); Director of player personnel (2005); Seattle Seahawks (2006–2009); Vice president of player personnel; Tennessee Titans (2010–2015); Vice president of player personnel (2010-2011); General manager (2012–2015); Atlanta Falcons (2016–present); National scout (2016-2020); Senior personnel executive (2021-present)

Awards and highlights
- Super Bowl champion (XXXVII)
- Executive profile at Pro Football Reference

Ruston Rials Webster (born September 30, 1962) is an American football executive who is currently a senior personnel executive for the Atlanta Falcons of the National Football League (NFL). He previously served as general manager of the Tennessee Titans. During his time with the Seattle Seahawks, Webster also served as the vice president of player personnel under general manager Tim Ruskell. His career began with the Tampa Bay Buccaneers, where he started as a scout.

He is a graduate of the University of Mississippi, and he and his wife, Gayle, have three children, a daughter, Hannah, and two sons, Jacob, and Drew. Ruston was born in Houston, Texas to Philip and Patricia Webster, while he was raised in Madison, Mississippi.
