= Jonnu Smith =

American football player (born 1995)

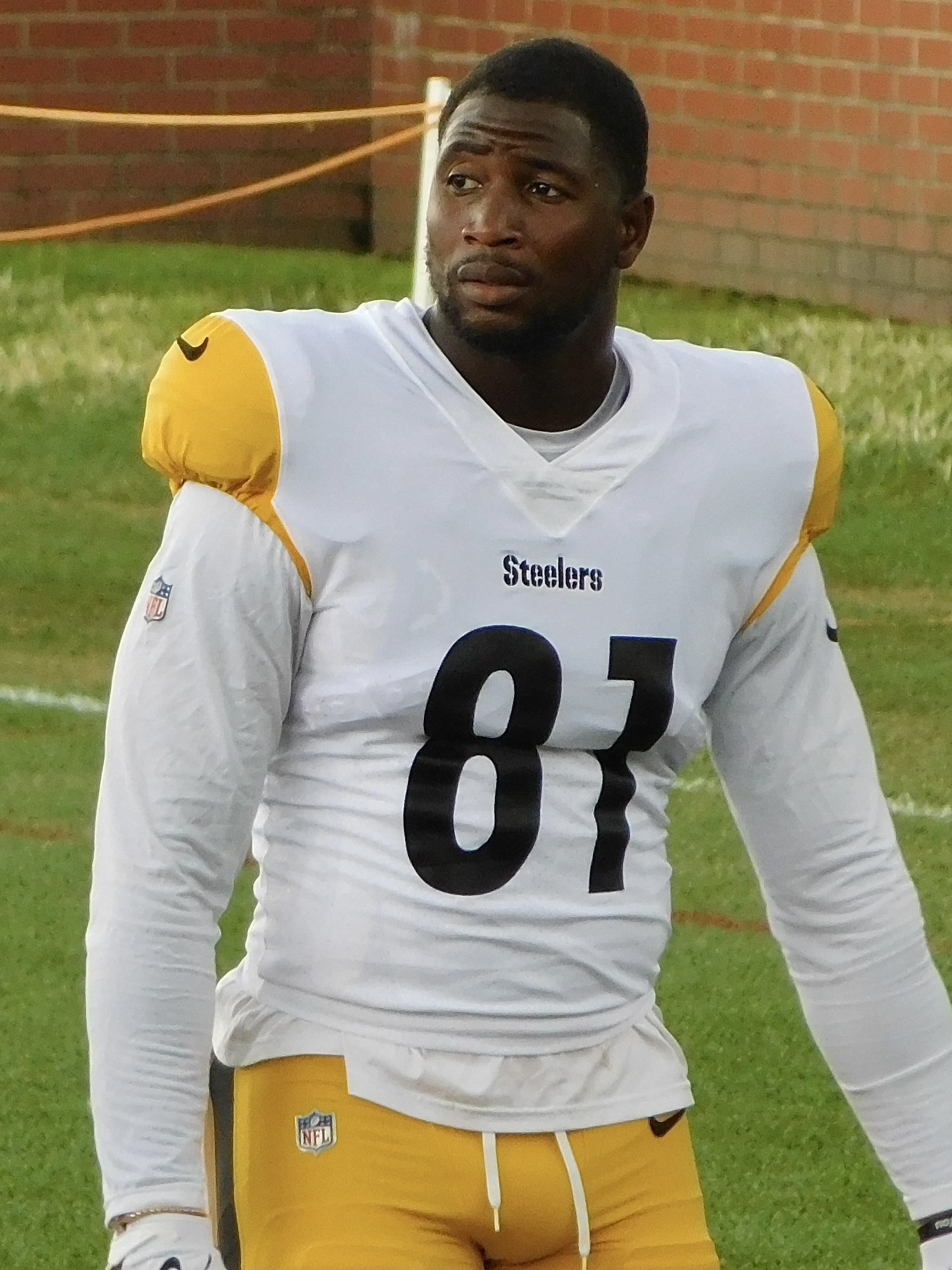
- Smith with the Pittsburgh Steelers in 2025

No. 18 – Green Bay Packers
- Position: Tight end
- Roster status: Active

Personal information
- Born: August 22, 1995 (age 31); Philadelphia, Pennsylvania, U.S.
- Listed height: 6 ft 3 in (1.91 m)
- Listed weight: 248 lb (112 kg)

Career information
- High school: West Port (Ocala, Florida)
- College: FIU (2013–2016)
- NFL draft: 2017: 3rd round, 100th overall pick

Career history
- Tennessee Titans (2017–2020); New England Patriots (2021–2022); Atlanta Falcons (2023); Miami Dolphins (2024); Pittsburgh Steelers (2025); Green Bay Packers (2026–present)

Awards and highlights
- Pro Bowl (2024); First-team All-Conference USA (2014)

Career NFL statistics as of Week 10, 2026
- Receptions: 351
- Receiving yards: 3,623
- Receiving touchdowns: 30
- Rushing yards: 196
- Rushing touchdowns: 2
- Stats at Pro Football Reference

Jonnu Andre Smith (born August 22, 1995) is an American professional football tight end for the Green Bay Packers of the National Football League (NFL). He played college football for the FIU Panthers and was selected by the Tennessee Titans in the third round of the 2017 NFL draft. After four seasons with the Titans, Smith joined the New England Patriots in 2021. He was later traded to the Atlanta Falcons in 2023 before signing with the Miami Dolphins in 2024 and with the Pittsburgh Steelers in 2025.

== Early life ==
Smith was raised in North Philadelphia, Pennsylvania, by his parents, Wayne and Karen Smith. He is the youngest of six children. When Smith was born, Karen was pressured by nurses to name him immediately, in accordance with hospital policies. After praying, she came up with the name Jonnu. Smith began playing Pop Warner football at age five.

Smith endured many challenges as a youngster in Philadelphia. After his brother was arrested and one of his friends was killed on the streets, Smith's family did not have the financial means to uproot. For his own safety, Smith moved in with his maternal aunt and uncle in Ocala, Florida. Smith started playing high school football at West Port High School, and even though he was far from a touted recruit, Smith earned a scholarship to Florida International.

== College career ==
Smith played college football at Florida International University, where he majored in liberal studies.

As a freshman in 2013, Smith played 12 games and finished with 39 receptions for 388 yards and two touchdowns.

As a sophomore in 2014, Smith played 12 games and had 61 receptions for 710 yards and eight touchdowns.

As a junior in 2015, Smith played in eight games and finished with 36 receptions for 397 yards and four touchdowns.

As a senior in 2016, Smith played 11 games and recorded 42 receptions for 506 yards and four touchdowns.

Smith was invited to play in the 2017 Senior Bowl, but was overshadowed by other tight ends who were considered first- and second-round picks.

=== Statistics ===
Year	Team	Games		Receiving			
Year	Team	GP	GS	Rec	Yds	Avg	TD
2013	FIU	12	12	39	388	9.9	2
2014	FIU	12	12	61	710	11.6	8
2015	FIU	8	8	36	397	11.0	4
2016	FIU	11	11	42	506	12.0	4
Career		43	43	178	2,001	11.2	18

== Professional career ==
=== Pre-draft ===
Smith was one of 19 tight ends who received an invitation to attend the NFL Scouting Combine in Indianapolis, Indiana. He had an impressive performance and finished in the top five among tight ends in most of the drills. Smith placed second in the vertical jump and short shuttle, tied for third in the bench press, fourth in the broad jump, and finished sixth in the 40-yard dash in his position group. On March 29, 2017, Smith opted to participate at FIU's pro day, along with Dieugot Joseph and ten other teammates. He performed the three-cone drill and positional drills for scouts and team representatives from 29 NFL teams and the Winnipeg Blue Bombers of the Canadian Football League. Throughout the pre-draft process, Smith had private workouts and visits with Atlanta Falcons, Tennessee Titans, New Orleans Saints, Miami Dolphins, and Minnesota Vikings. At the end of the pre-draft process, Smith was projected to be a fourth or fifth round pick by NFL draft experts and analysts. He was ranked the tenth best tight end in the draft by NFLDraftScout.com and was ranked the 12th best tight end by NFL analyst Gil Brandt.

Pre-draft measurables
Height	Weight	Arm length	Hand span	Wingspan	40-yard dash	10-yard split	20-yard split	20-yard shuttle	Three-cone drill	Vertical jump	Broad jump	Bench press
6 ft 2 5/8 in (1.90 m)	248 lb (112 kg)	32 7/8 in (0.84 m)	9 1/4 in (0.23 m)	6 ft 6 1/4 in (1.99 m)	4.62 s	1.64 s	2.71 s	4.18 s	7.43 s	38 in (0.97 m)	10 ft 7 in (3.23 m)	22 reps
All values from NFL Combine/Pro Day

=== Tennessee Titans ===
==== 2017 season ====
The Titans selected Smith in the third round (100th overall) in the 2017 NFL draft. He was the sixth tight end selected. Smith was the seventh player selected in FIU's school history and third-highest selection in school history. The Titans selected Smith to fill a void in their two tight end sets after Anthony Fasano departed for the Dolphins in free agency.

On May 17, 2017, the Titans signed Smith to a four-year, $3.1 million contract that included a signing bonus of $706,288.

Throughout training camp, Smith competed against veterans Jace Amaro and Phillip Supernaw to be the Titans' second tight end behind veteran Delanie Walker.

Smith made his NFL debut starting in the season-opening 26–16 loss to the Oakland Raiders. In the next game against the Jacksonville Jaguars, he recorded two receptions for 30 yards and scored his first NFL touchdown on a 32-yard screen pass from Marcus Mariota during the fourth quarter of the 37–16 road victory. The following week against the Seattle Seahawks, Smith caught a 24-yard touchdown in the third quarter of the 33–27 victory. During Week 5 against the Miami Dolphins, he had a season-high five receptions for 21 yards in the 16–10 road loss.

Smith finished his rookie year with 18 receptions for 157 yards and two touchdowns in 16 games and 13 starts. The Titans finished second in the AFC South with a 9–7 record and made the playoffs as the #5-seed. During the Wild Card Round against the Kansas City Chiefs, Smith recorded two receptions for 15 yards in the narrow 22–21 comeback road victory. In the Divisional Round against the New England Patriots, he had a four-yard reception before suffering a torn MCL during the 35–14 road loss.

==== 2018 season ====
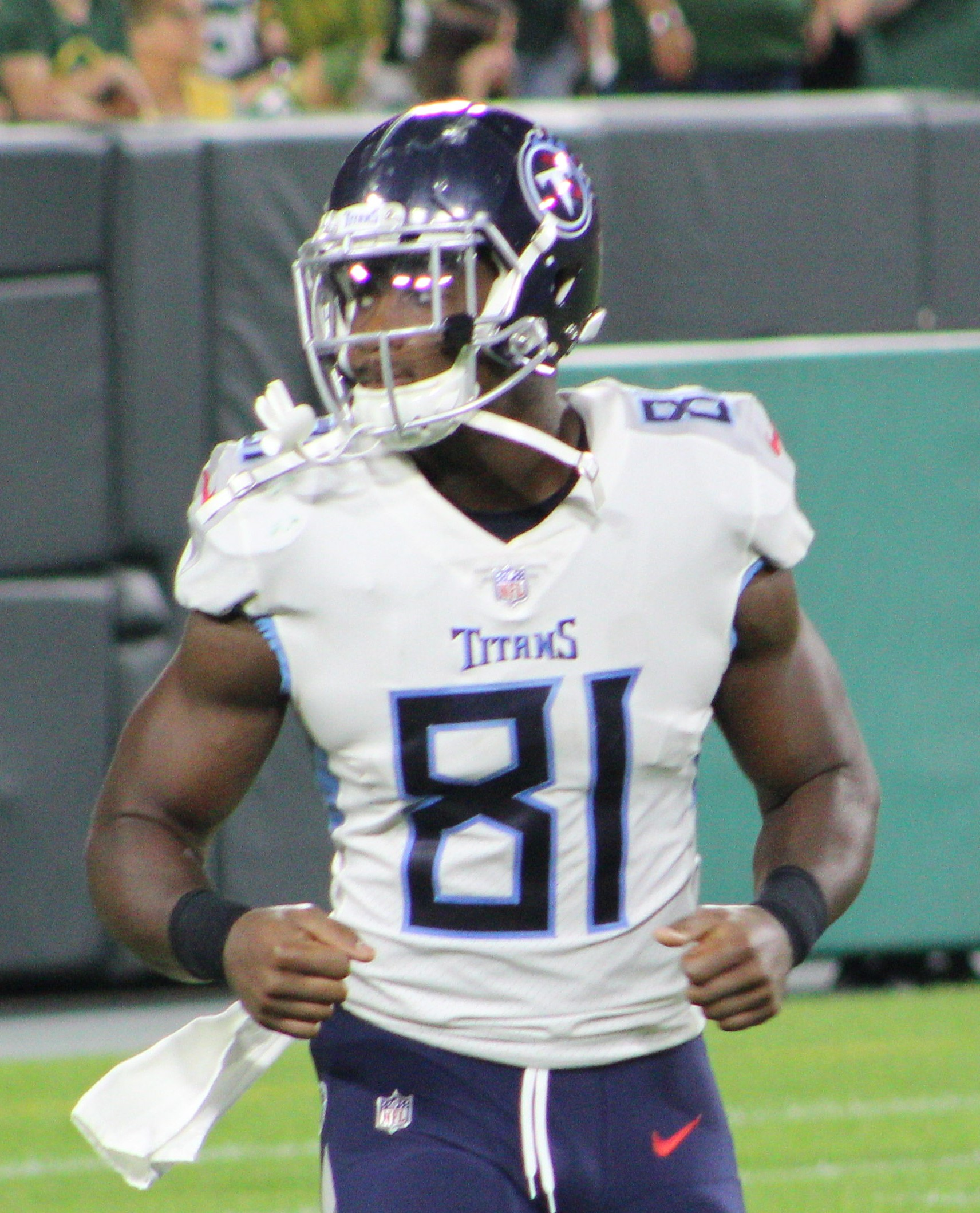
Smith in 2018

Smith was named the Titans' top tight end on the depth chart after starter Delanie Walker suffered a dislocated ankle during the season-opening 27–20 road loss to the Dolphins. Smith initially struggled filling Walker's shoes, but he caught his first touchdown of the season on a shovel pass during a Week 9 28–14 road victory over the Dallas Cowboys on Monday Night Football. Smith finished the game with two receptions for 33 yards and the aforementioned touchdown. In the next game against the Patriots, he recorded three receptions for 45 yards and a touchdown during the 34–10 victory. Two weeks later against the Houston Texans on Monday Night Football, Smith had two receptions for 63 yards and a 61-yard touchdown in the 34–17 road loss. However, during a Week 14 30–9 victory over the Jaguars, he suffered a season-ending MCL injury.

Smith finished his second professional season with 20 receptions for 258 yards and three touchdowns in 13 games and 12 starts. Without Smith, the Titans finished with a 9–7 record and narrowly missed out on the playoffs.

==== 2019 season ====
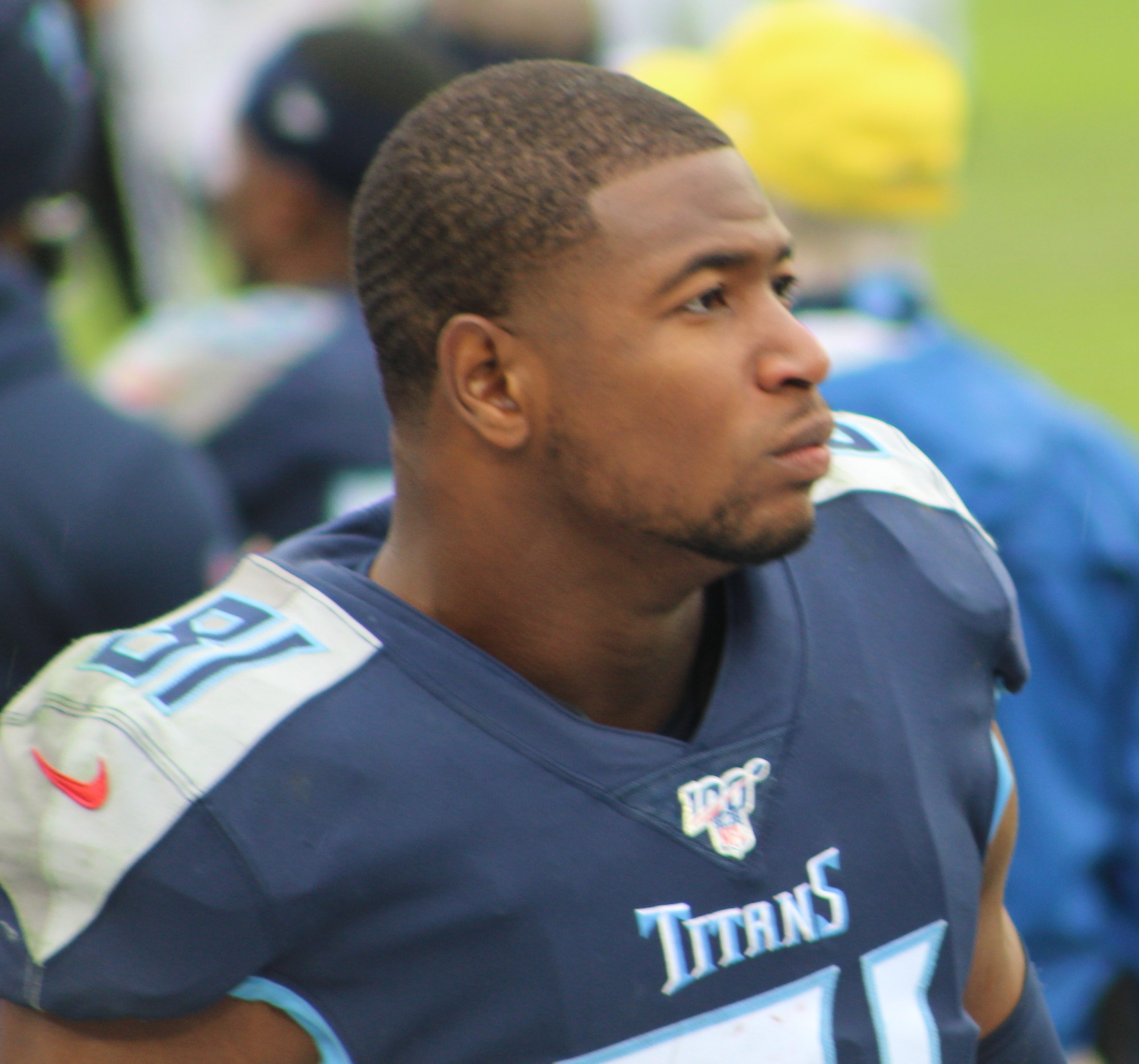
Smith in 2019

Smith returned from injury in time for the season opener against the Cleveland Browns. He recorded a seven-yard reception and a 10-yard rush during the 43–13 road victory. During a Week 5 14–7 loss to the Buffalo Bills, Smith had a 57-yard reception. Two weeks later against the Los Angeles Chargers, he had three receptions for 64 yards in the 23–20 victory. In the next game against the Tampa Bay Buccaneers, he caught six passes for 78 yards and his first touchdown of the season from Ryan Tannehill during the 27–23 victory.

During Week 14 against the Raiders, Smith recorded three receptions for 29 yards and a touchdown in the 42–21 road victory. In the next game against the Texans, he had five receptions for 60 yards and a 57-yard rush during the 24–21 loss. Smith continued his momentum the following week against the New Orleans Saints, catching three passes for 63 yards and a touchdown in the 38–28 loss.

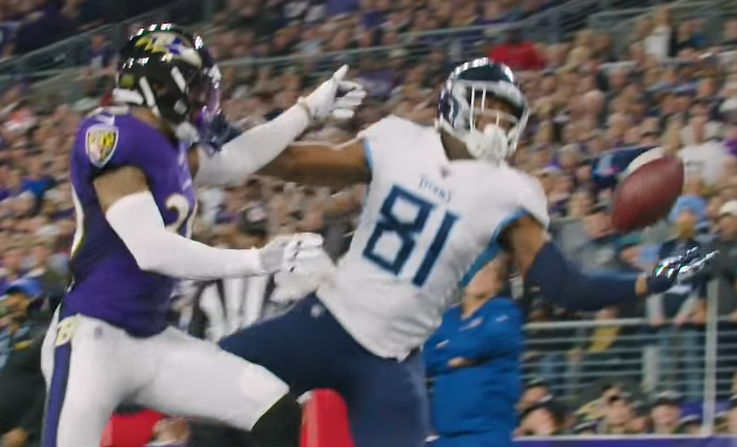
Smith catching a touchdown in the AFC Divisional Round of the playoffs against the Baltimore Ravens

Smith finished the 2019 season setting career-highs in receptions with 35 and receiving yards with 439 along with tying a career-high in touchdowns with three while also rushing four times for 78 yards in 16 games and 14 starts. The Titans finished second in the AFC South with a 9–7 record and made the playoffs as the #6-seed. In the Divisional Round against the Ravens, Smith caught a one-handed touchdown during the first quarter of the 28–12 road victory. He finished the game with two receptions for 12 yards and the aforementioned touchdown. During the AFC Championship Game against the Chiefs, Smith had three receptions for 38 yards in the 35–24 road loss.

==== 2020 season ====
After recording four receptions for 36 yards and a touchdown during the narrow season-opening 16–14 road victory over the Denver Broncos, Smith had four receptions for 84 yards and two touchdowns during a Week 2 33–30 victory over the Jaguars. Three weeks later against the Bills on Tuesday Night Football, he caught five passes for 40 yards and two touchdowns in the 42–16 victory.

During Week 9 against the Chicago Bears, Smith caught two passes for 32 yards and a touchdown in the 24–17 victory. In the next game against the Indianapolis Colts on Thursday Night Football, he recorded two receptions for 14 yards and his first rushing touchdown during the second quarter of the 34–17 loss. The following week against the Ravens, Smith had four receptions for 20 yards and a touchdown in the 30–24 overtime road victory. During a Week 16 40–14 road loss to the Green Bay Packers on Sunday Night Football, he caught three passes for 30 yards and his eighth touchdown of the season.

Smith finished the 2020 season setting career-highs in receptions with 41, receiving yards with 448, and receiving touchdowns with eight while also rushing twice for four yards and a touchdown in 15 games and 14 starts. The Titans finished atop the AFC South with an 11–5 record and qualified for the playoffs as the #4-seed. During the Wild Card Round against the Ravens, Smith had two receptions for nine yards in the 20–13 loss.

=== New England Patriots ===
==== 2021 season ====
On March 19, 2021, the New England Patriots signed Smith to a four-year, $50 million deal.

Smith made his Patriots debut in the season-opener against the Dolphins and finished the narrow 17–16 loss with five receptions for 42 yards and a six-yard carry. Three week later against the Buccaneers on Sunday Night Football, Smith had three receptions for 14 yards and his only touchdown of the season in the narrow 19–17 loss.

Smith finished the 2021 season with 28 receptions for 294 yards and a touchdown in 16 games and 11 starts. The Patriots finished second in the AFC East with a 10–7 record and qualified for the playoffs as a Wild Card team. During the Wild Card Round against the Bills, Smith recorded no statistics in the 47–17 road loss.

==== 2022 season ====
Smith entered the season as the backup tight end behind Hunter Henry. He finished the 2022 season with 27 receptions for 245 yards in 14 games and eight starts.

=== Atlanta Falcons ===
On March 15, 2023, Smith was traded to the Falcons in exchange for a 2023 seventh-round draft pick, reuniting him with head coach Arthur Smith, who was Smith's tight end coach and offensive coordinator during his time in Tennessee.

During a Week 6 24–16 loss to the Washington Commanders, Smith recorded four receptions for 36 yards and a touchdown. Three weeks later against the Minnesota Vikings, he had five receptions for 100 yards and a touchdown in the 31–28 loss. In the regular-season finale against the Saints, Smith caught three passes for 29 yards and a touchdown during the 48–17 road loss.

Smith finished the 2023 season with a career-high 50 receptions for 582 yards and three touchdowns in 16 games and six starts.

On February 27, 2024, Smith was released by the Falcons.

=== Miami Dolphins ===
On March 7, 2024, Smith signed a two-year. $10 million contract with the Miami Dolphins.

Smith made his Dolphins debut in the season-opener against the Jaguars and finished the 20–17 victory with a seven-yard reception. During a Week 7 16–10 road loss to the Colts, Smith caught seven passes for 96 yards and his first touchdown of the season.

During a Week 11 34–19 victory over the Raiders, Smith had six receptions for 101 yards and two touchdowns. In the next game against his former team, the Patriots, Smith caught nine passes for 87 yards and a touchdown during the 34–15 victory. The following week against the Packers on Thanksgiving, he recorded 10 receptions for 113 yards in the 30–17 road loss. Smith caught a touchdown in four of the final five games of the regular season.

Smith finished the 2024 season setting career highs in receptions with 88 and receiving yards with 884 while tying a career-high eight receiving touchdowns in 17 games and six starts.

=== Pittsburgh Steelers ===
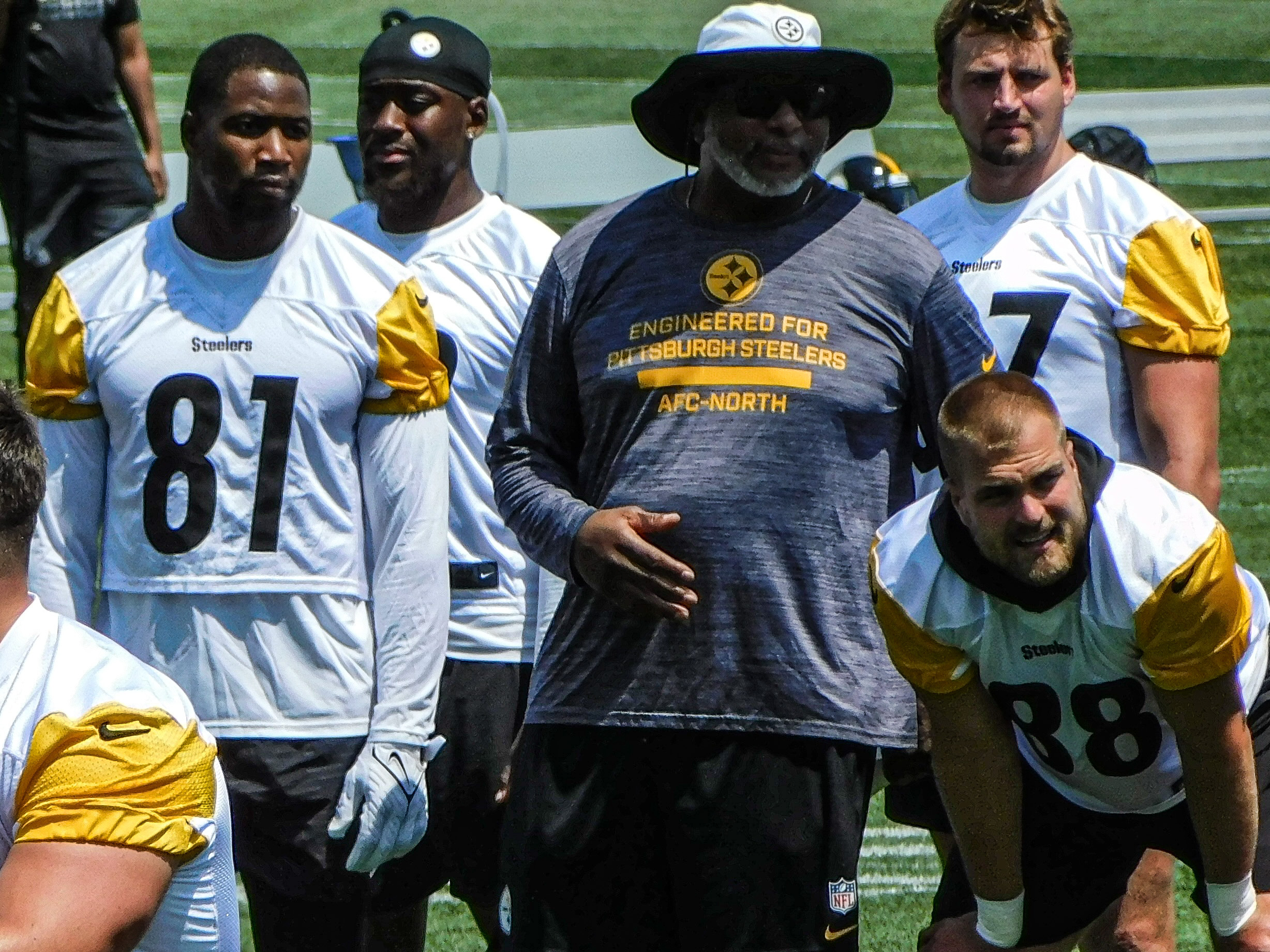
Smith (#81) with the Steelers tight ends during training camp in 2025

On June 30, 2025, Smith, along with Jalen Ramsey and a 2027 seventh-round pick, was traded to the Pittsburgh Steelers in exchange for Minkah Fitzpatrick and a 2027 fifth-round pick. The trade reunited Smith for the second time with offensive coordinator Arthur Smith.

Smith made his Steelers debut in the narrow season-opening 34–32 road victory over the New York Jets, catching five passes for 15 yards and a touchdown. During a narrow 33–31 road loss to the Cincinnati Bengals on Thursday Night Football, Smith had three receptions for 28 yards and a touchdown. During Week 15 against his former team, the Dolphins, Smith recorded two receptions for 12 yards and a 14-yard rushing touchdown in the 28–15 victory on Monday Night Football. He finished the 2025 season with 38 receptions for 222 yards and two touchdowns. On March 5, 2026, Smith was released by the team.

=== Green Bay Packers ===
On August 29, 2026, Smith signed a one–year contract with the Green Bay Packers.

== NFL career statistics ==
=== Regular season ===
Year	Team	Games		Receiving					Rushing					Fumbles	
Year	Team	GP	GS	Rec	Yds	Avg	Lng	TD	Att	Yds	Avg	Lng	TD	Fum	Lost
2017	TEN	16	13	18	157	8.7	32	2	0	0	0.0	0	0	0	0
2018	TEN	13	12	20	258	12.9	61	3	0	0	0.0	0	0	1	0
2019	TEN	16	14	35	439	12.5	57	3	4	78	19.5	57	0	0	0
2020	TEN	15	14	41	448	10.9	63	8	2	4	2.0	3	1	0	0
2021	NE	16	11	28	294	10.5	28	1	9	40	4.4	9	0	1	0
2022	NE	14	8	27	245	9.1	53	0	1	5	5.0	5	0	1	0
2023	ATL	17	6	50	582	11.6	60	3	1	0	0.0	0	0	1	1
2024	MIA	17	6	88	884	10.0	57	8	2	-1	-0.5	0	0	2	1
2025	PIT	17	7	38	222	5.8	21	2	9	70	7.8	20	1	1	0
2026	GNB	9	0	6	94	15.7	43	0	0	0	0.0	0	0	0	0
Career		150	91	351	3,623	10.3	63	30	28	196	7.0	57	2	7	2

=== Postseason ===
Year	Team	Games		Receiving					Fumbles	
Year	Team	GP	GS	Rec	Yds	Avg	Lng	TD	Fum	Lost
2017	TEN	2	1	3	19	6.3	10	0	0	0
2019	TEN	3	3	6	59	9.8	22	1	0	0
2020	TEN	1	1	2	9	4.5	5	0	0	0
2021	NE	1	1	0	0	0.0	0	0	0	0
2025	PIT	1	1	2	-1	-0.5	0	0	0	0
Career		8	7	13	86	6.6	22	1	0	0

== Personal life ==
Smith is a Christian. He has said, “[Faith is] the foundation of everything I do, and I am so thankful for the way I was raised because I lean on the things I learned as a kid today as a grown man. ... I am a man of faith, and I am a man of God and I truly believe that everything is ordained for a purpose.”

Smith's best friend, Willie “Quasim” Jefferson, died from a gunshot in October 2016. Smith gave his son Jaiyen the middle name Quasim in honor of Jefferson. Smith competed in weightlifting, finishing second in the county in the 219-pound weight class.

Smith credits his mother, Karen, for his successes. When Smith was four, his father, Wayne, died in a work-related tow truck accident at age 40. As a result, Karen raised all six children all by herself. "My mother is my rock," said Smith. "It was tough, but we always got what we needed—not necessarily what we wanted all the time—but what we needed. She was so strong all the time."

On October 31, 2016, Smith was involved in an altercation with his girlfriend, Mary Gaspar, who was five months pregnant with their child. The argument took place in their campus dorm room, where Gaspar used a kitchen pot and poured boiling hot water onto Smith. Smith suffered burns and was ruled out for the rest of his senior year. Gaspar was arrested for aggravated battery and entered a not guilty plea. The charges against her were dropped the following year after delivering their child.
