= 2017 Tennessee Titans season =

58th season in franchise history; first playoff berth since 2008

- Owner: KSA Industries
- General manager: Jon Robinson
- Head coach: Mike Mularkey
- Offensive coordinator: Terry Robiskie
- Defensive coordinator: Dick LeBeau
- Home stadium: Nissan Stadium

Results
- Record: 9–7
- Division place: 2nd AFC South
- Playoffs: Won Wild Card Playoffs (at Chiefs) 22–21; Lost Divisional Playoffs (at Patriots) 14–35
- All-Pros: 2: FS Kevin Byard (1st team); P Brett Kern (2nd team)
- Pro Bowlers: 6: FS Kevin Byard; DT Jurrell Casey; P Brett Kern; OT Taylor Lewan; ST Brynden Trawick; TE Delanie Walker

Uniform
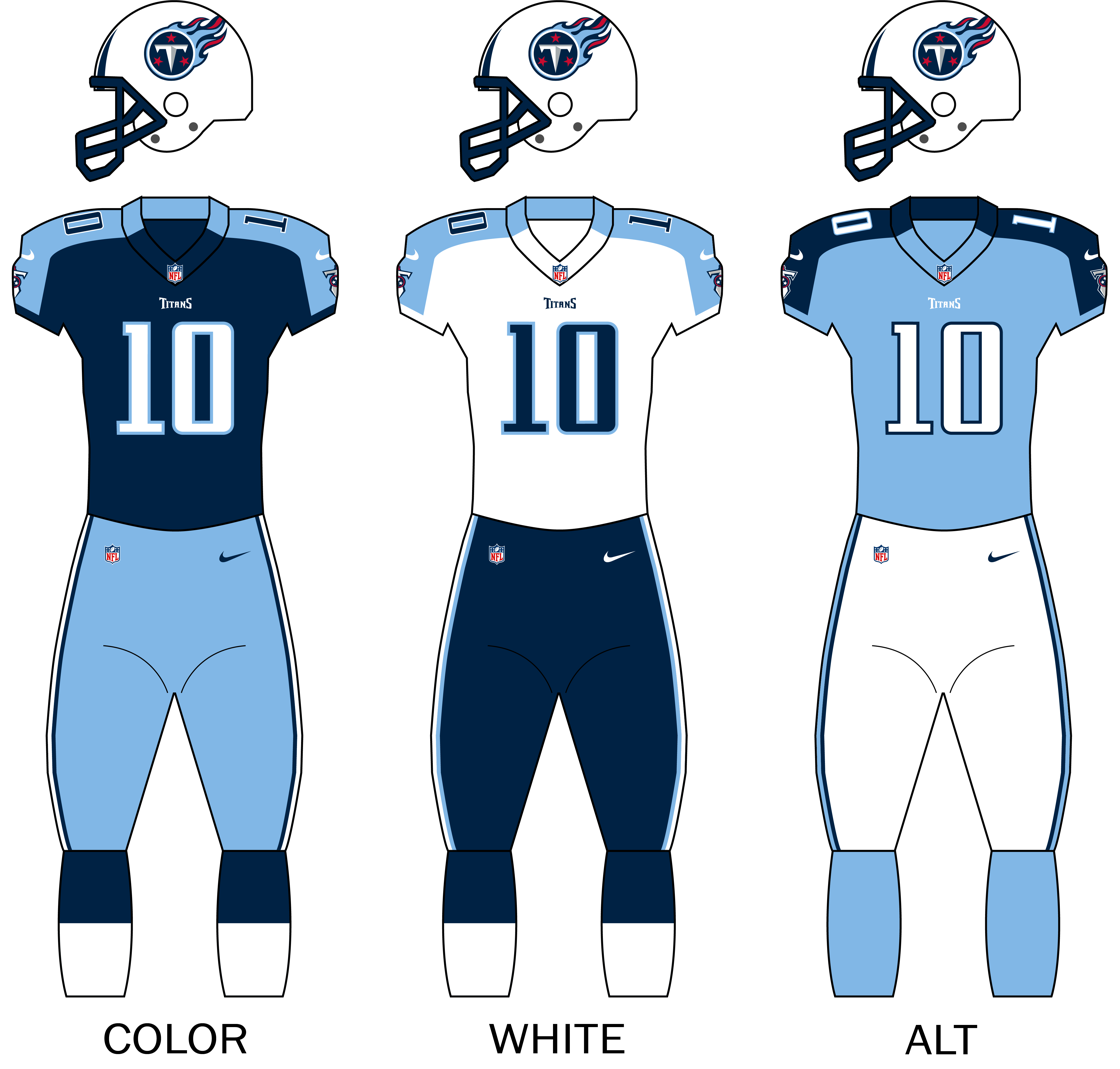

The 2017 season was the Tennessee Titans' 48th in the National Football League (NFL) and the 58th overall. It also marked the franchise's 21st season in the state of Tennessee as well as the second full season under head coach Mike Mularkey. They equaled their record from a year ago, and not only that, with a 15–10 win over the Jacksonville Jaguars in Week 17, they clinched their first playoff berth since 2008. In the first round, the Titans rallied from a 21–3 halftime deficit against the Chiefs to win 22–21, winning their first playoff game since 2003. However, they were defeated by the New England Patriots in the divisional round by the score of 35–14. Despite making the playoffs and winning a playoff game, this would be Mularkey's final year coaching the Titans, as they parted ways after the season ended. This is also the last season where the Titans wore their uniform design since 1999.

== Offseason ==
=== Organizational changes ===
On January 4, the Titans fired wide receivers coach Bob Bratkowski and assistant wide receivers coach Jason Tucker. On January 5, general manager Jon Robinson was promoted to executive vice president/general manager.

=== Roster changes ===
==== Reserve/future free agent contracts ====
Player	Position
Karim Barton	G
Kourtnei Brown	LB
Reshard Cliett	OLB
Jerome Cunningham	TE
David Fluellen	RB
Jonathan Krause	WR
Caushaud Lyons	DT
Tyler Marz	T
K. J. Maye	WR
Tim Semisch	TE
Tye Smith	DB

The first transactions of the year occurred shortly after the conclusion of the 2016 regular season on January 3, 2017, when the Titans signed offensive lineman Karim Barton, linebacker Kourtnei Brown, tight end Jerome Cunningham, running back David Fluellen, wide receiver Jonathan Krause, offensive tackle Tyler Marz, and wide receiver K.J. Maye to reserve/future contracts.

On January 4, the Titans signed linebacker Reshard Cliett and tight end Tim Semisch to reserve/future contracts.

The Titans signed their final two futures contracts of 2017, in defensive back Tye Smith on January 16 and defensive tackle Caushaud Lyons on January 24.

==== Free agents ====
2017 Tennessee Titans Free Agency
Position	Player	Status*	Date signed	2016 Team	2017 Team
RB	Antonio Andrews	UFA		Tennessee Titans	None
OLB	David Bass	UFA	May 9, 2017	Tennessee Titans	Seattle Seahawks
LB/ST	Daren Bates	UFA	March 9, 2017	Oakland Raiders	Tennessee Titans
RT	Byron Bell	UFA	March 24, 2017	Tennessee Titans	Dallas Cowboys
CB	Valentino Blake	UFA	March 20, 2017	Tennessee Titans	New York Giants
QB	Matt Cassel	UFA	March 2, 2017	Tennessee Titans	Tennessee Titans
SS	Johnathan Cyprien	UFA	March 9, 2017	Jacksonville Jaguars	Tennessee Titans
TE	Anthony Fasano	UFA	March 9, 2017	Tennessee Titans	Miami Dolphins
CB	Demontre Hurst	UFA	April 3, 2017	Chicago Bears	Tennessee Titans
FS	Rashad Johnson	UFA		Tennessee Titans	None
DT	Karl Klug	UFA	March 9, 2017	Tennessee Titans	Tennessee Titans
G	Tim Lelito	UFA	March 22, 2017	New Orleans Saints	Tennessee Titans
WR	Marc Mariani	UFA		Tennessee Titans	None
ILB	Nate Palmer	UFA	March 9, 2017	Tennessee Titans	Tennessee Titans
CB	Logan Ryan	UFA	March 9, 2017	New England Patriots	Tennessee Titans
C	Brian Schwenke	UFA	March 13, 2017	Tennessee Titans	Indianapolis Colts
ILB	Sean Spence	UFA	March 19, 2017	Tennessee Titans	Indianapolis Colts
SS	Daimion Stafford	UFA	May 30, 2017	Tennessee Titans	Pittsburgh Steelers
TE	Phillip Supernaw	UFA	March 10, 2017	Tennessee Titans	Tennessee Titans
S/ST	Brynden Trawick	UFA	March 9, 2017	Oakland Raiders	Tennessee Titans
G	Chance Warmack	UFA	March 9, 2017	Tennessee Titans	Philadelphia Eagles
WR/RS	Eric Weems	UFA	March 10, 2017	Atlanta Falcons	Tennessee Titans
NT	Sylvester Williams	UFA	March 10, 2017	Denver Broncos	Tennessee Titans
WR	Kendall Wright	UFA	March 11, 2017	Tennessee Titans	Chicago Bears
*RFA: Restricted free agent, UFA: Unrestricted free agent, ERFA: Exclusive rights free agent
Legend: = Addition = Departure = Re-signed

==== Departures ====
Position	Player	Date Released/Waived
CB	Jason McCourty	April 13, 2017
NT	Al Woods	March 8, 2017

=== 2017 NFL draft ===
2017 Tennessee Titans Draft
Round	Selection	Player	Position	College
1	5	Corey Davis	WR	Western Michigan
1	18	Adoree' Jackson	CB	USC
3	72	Taywan Taylor	WR	Western Kentucky
3	100*	Jonnu Smith	TE	FIU
5	155	Jayon Brown	ILB	UCLA
6	217*	Corey Levin	OG	Chattanooga
7	227	Josh Carraway	OLB	TCU
7	236	Brad Seaton	OT	Villanova
7	241	Khalfani Muhammad	RB	California

*	Compensatory selection

Notes

- The 2017 NFL draft marked the first year that compensatory picks could be traded.

2017 Tennessee Titans Draft Trades
Draft Pick Year	Round	Overall	Team	Received
2016	1	1	to LA Rams	Received LA's 2016 first-round selection (No. 15 overall), two 2016 second-round selections (No. 43 overall) and (No. 45 overall), 2016 third-round selection (No. 76 overall), 2017 first-round selection (No. 5 overall), and 2017 third-round compensatory selection (No. 100 overall).
2016	4	113	to LA Rams	Received LA's 2016 first-round selection (No. 15 overall), two 2016 second-round selections (No. 43 overall) and (No. 45 overall), 2016 third-round selection (No. 76 overall), 2017 first-round selection (No. 5 overall), and 2017 third-round compensatory selection (No. 100 overall).
2016	6	177	to LA Rams	Received LA's 2016 first-round selection (No. 15 overall), two 2016 second-round selections (No. 43 overall) and (No. 45 overall), 2016 third-round selection (No. 76 overall), 2017 first-round selection (No. 5 overall), and 2017 third-round compensatory selection (No. 100 overall).
2016	1	15	to Cleveland Browns	Received Cleveland's 2016 first-round selection (No. 8 overall) and 2016 sixth-round selection (No. 176 overall).
2016	3	76	to Cleveland Browns	Received Cleveland's 2016 first-round selection (No. 8 overall) and 2016 sixth-round selection (No. 176 overall).
2017	2	52	to Cleveland Browns	Received Cleveland's 2016 first-round selection (No. 8 overall) and 2016 sixth-round selection (No. 176 overall).
2017	3	83	to New England Patriots	Received New England's 2017 third-round selection (No. 72 overall) and 2017 sixth-round selection (No. 200 overall).
2017	4	124	to New England Patriots	Received New England's 2017 third-round selection (No. 72 overall) and 2017 sixth-round selection (No. 200 overall).
2017	5	164	to Philadelphia Eagles	Received Philadelphia's 2017 fifth-round selection (No. 155 overall).
2017	6	214	to Philadelphia Eagles	Received Philadelphia's 2017 fifth-round selection (No. 155 overall).
2017	6	200	to New York Giants	Received New York's 2017 sixth-round selection (No. 207 overall) and 2017 seventh-round selection (No. 241 overall).
2017	6	207	to Cincinnati Bengals	Received Cincinnati's 2017 sixth-round compensatory selection (No. 217 overall) and 2017 seventh-round selection (No. 227 overall).

=== Undrafted free agents ===
2017 Tennessee Titans Undrafted Free Agents
Name	Position	School
Jeremy Boykins	CB	UCF
DeAngelo Brown	DT	Louisville
Bra'lon Cherry	WR	NC State
Tyler Ferguson	QB	Western Kentucky
John Green	CB	Connecticut
Roderick Henderson	NT	Alabama State
Denzel Johnson	LB	TCU
Akeem Judd	RB	Mississippi
KeVonn Mabon	WR	Ball State
Steven Moore	OT	California
Giovanni Pascascio	WR	Louisville
Jonah Pirsig	OT	Minnesota

=== Minicamp tryouts ===
Name	Position	School
Manuel Abad	CB	Florida Tech
Sterling Bailey	DE	Georgia
Alexander Boy	P	Nevada
Demeitre Brim	LB	UCF
Jacques Bryant	S	Florida A&M
Brandon Burks	RB	Troy
Ryan DiSalvo	LS	San Jose State
Chris Hale	OLB	MTSU
T.J. Holloman	OLB	South Carolina
Martin Ifedi	DE	Memphis
Tre' Jackson	G	Florida State
Kody Kohl	FB	Arizona State
Branden Leston	S	Western Kentucky
Donatella Luckett	WR	Harding
Sean Maguire	QB	Florida State
Jeoffrey Pagan	DE	Alabama
Andrew Price	TE	UNLV
Johnny Ragin	LB	Oregon
Steven Rhodes	OLB	MTSU
Bobby Richardson	DE	Indiana
Cameron Robbins	DE	Northwestern
Darius Sims	CB	Vanderbilt
Jimmy Staten	DE	MTSU
Ja'Karri Thomas	LB	Vanderbilt
Cedric Thompson	S	Minnesota
Dylan Wiesman	C	Tennessee
Ethan Wood	P	Wyoming
Myles Norwood	CB	Purdue

== Staff ==
2017 Tennessee Titans staff
Front office: Owner – KSA Industries; President, chairman and CEO – Steve Underwood; Executive vice president and general manager – Jon Robinson; Vice president of football administration – Vin Marino; Director of player personnel – Ryan Cowden; Director of college scouting – Jon Salge; Director of pro scouting – Brian Gardner; Head coaches: Head coach – Mike Mularkey; Assistant head coach/defensive coordinator – Dick LeBeau; Offensive coaches: Offensive coordinator – Terry Robiskie; Quarterbacks – Jason Michael; Running backs – Sylvester Croom; Wide receivers – Frisman Jackson; Assistant wide receivers – Luke Steckel; Tight ends – Arthur Smith; Offensive line – Russ Grimm; Assistant offensive line – Mike Sullivan	Defensive coaches: Defensive line – Nick Eason; Assistant defensive line – Keith Willis; Linebackers – Lou Spanos; Defensive backs − Deshea Townsend; Assistant defensive backs – Steve Jackson; Defensive assistant – Brandon Blaney; Special teams coaches: Special teams coordinator – Steve Hoffman; Assistant special teams – Craig Aukerman; Strength and conditioning: Assistant head coach/strength and conditioning – Steve Watterson; Assistant to the strength and conditioning coach – Tom Kanavy; Strength and conditioning assistant – Taylor Porter

== Final roster ==
2017 Tennessee Titans roster
Quarterbacks (QB): 16 Matt Cassel; 8 Marcus Mariota; 3 Brandon Weeden; Running backs (RB): 32 David Fluellen; 22 Derrick Henry; 28 Khalfani Muhammad; 29 DeMarco Murray; Wide receivers (WR): 84 Corey Davis; 87 Eric Decker; 83 Harry Douglas; 18 Rishard Matthews; 13 Taywan Taylor; 14 Eric Weems; Tight ends (TE): 81 Jonnu Smith; 88 Luke Stocker; 89 Phillip Supernaw; 82 Delanie Walker	Offensive linemen (OL): 78 Jack Conklin T; 60 Ben Jones C; 71 Dennis Kelly T; 64 Josh Kline G; 61 Corey Levin G; 77 Taylor Lewan T; 62 Brian Schwenke G/C; 67 Quinton Spain G; Defensive linemen (DL): 99 Jurrell Casey DE; 94 Austin Johnson NT; 95 David King DE; 97 Karl Klug DE; 96 Sylvester Williams NT	Linebackers (LB): 53 Daren Bates ILB; 55 Jayon Brown ILB; 44 Josh Carraway OLB; 92 Kevin Dodd OLB; 91 Derrick Morgan OLB; 98 Brian Orakpo OLB; 50 Nate Palmer OLB; 93 Erik Walden OLB; 54 Avery Williamson ILB; 59 Wesley Woodyard ILB; Defensive backs (DB): 31 Kevin Byard FS; 37 Johnathan Cyprien SS; 25 Adoree' Jackson CB; 23 Brice McCain CB; 24 Kalan Reed CB; 35 Curtis Riley SS; 26 Logan Ryan CB; 21 Da'Norris Searcy SS; 33 Tye Smith CB; 41 Brynden Trawick FS; Special teams (ST): 48 Beau Brinkley LS; 6 Brett Kern P; 4 Ryan Succop K	Practice squad: 15 Darius Jennings WR; 42 Denzel Johnson SS; 69 Tyler Marz T; 70 Johnny Maxey DE; 17 Zach Pascal WR; 85 Tim Semisch TE; 72 Julius Warmsley DE; 68 Cody Wichmann G; 75 Antwaun Woods NT; Reserve: 90 DaQuan Jones DE (IR); 51 Victor Ochi OLB (IR); 19 Tajae Sharpe WR (IR); 36 LeShaun Sims CB (IR); 11 Alex Tanney QB (IR); 52 Aaron Wallace OLB (IR); Rookies in italics 53 active, 6 reserve, 9 practice squad

=== Team captains ===
- Marcus Mariota (QB)
- Delanie Walker (TE)
- Jurrell Casey (DE)
- Brian Orakpo (LB)
- Wesley Woodyard (LB)
- Tim Shaw (Honorary, former Titans LB)

== Preseason ==
Week	Date	Opponent	Result	Record	Venue	Recap
1	August 12	at New York Jets	L 3–7	0–1	MetLife Stadium	Recap
2	August 19	Carolina Panthers	W 34–27	1–1	Nissan Stadium	Recap
3	August 27	Chicago Bears	L 7–19	1–2	Nissan Stadium	Recap
4	August 31	at Kansas City Chiefs	L 6–30	1–3	Arrowhead Stadium	Recap

== Regular season ==
=== Schedule ===
Week	Date	Opponent	Result	Record	Venue	Recap
1	September 10	Oakland Raiders	**L** 16–26	0–1	Nissan Stadium	Recap
2	September 17	at **Jacksonville Jaguars**	**W** 37–16	1–1	EverBank Field	Recap
3	September 24	Seattle Seahawks	**W** 33–27	2–1	Nissan Stadium	Recap
4	October 1	at **Houston Texans**	**L** 14–57	2–2	NRG Stadium	Recap
5	October 8	at Miami Dolphins	**L** 10–16	2–3	Hard Rock Stadium	Recap
6	October 16	**Indianapolis Colts**	**W** 36–22	3–3	Nissan Stadium	Recap
7	October 22	at Cleveland Browns	**W** 12–9 (OT)	4–3	FirstEnergy Stadium	Recap
8	Bye					
9	November 5	Baltimore Ravens	**W** 23–20	5–3	Nissan Stadium	Recap
10	November 12	Cincinnati Bengals	**W** 24–20	6–3	Nissan Stadium	Recap
11	November 16	at Pittsburgh Steelers	**L** 17–40	6–4	Heinz Field	Recap
12	November 26	at **Indianapolis Colts**	**W** 20–16	7–4	Lucas Oil Stadium	Recap
13	December 3	**Houston Texans**	**W** 24–13	8–4	Nissan Stadium	Recap
14	December 10	at Arizona Cardinals	**L** 7–12	8–5	University of Phoenix Stadium	Recap
15	December 17	at San Francisco 49ers	**L** 23–25	8–6	Levi's Stadium	Recap
16	December 24	Los Angeles Rams	**L** 23–27	8–7	Nissan Stadium	Recap
17	December 31	**Jacksonville Jaguars**	**W** 15–10	9–7	Nissan Stadium	Recap

Note: Intra-division opponents are in bold text.

=== Game summaries ===
==== Week 1: vs. Oakland Raiders ====
Week One: Oakland Raiders at Tennessee Titans – Game summary

Quarter	1	2	3	4	Total
**Raiders**	7	6	3	10	**26**
Titans	7	3	3	3	**16**

at Nissan Stadium, Nashville, Tennessee

- Date: September 10
- Game time: 12:00 p.m. CDT
- Game weather: 72 °F (22 °C), sunny
- Game attendance: 69,089
- Referee: Jerome Boger
- TV announcers (CBS): Jim Nantz, Tony Romo and Tracy Wolfson
- Recap, Gamebook

Game information

**First quarter**

- OAK – Amari Cooper 8–yard pass from Derek Carr (Giorgio Tavecchio kick), 12:49. Raiders 7–0. **Drive: 4 plays, 50 yards, 2:11.**
- TEN – Marcus Mariota 10–yard run (Ryan Succop kick), 6:58. Tied 7–7. **Drive: 12 plays, 75 yards, 5:51.**

**Second quarter**

- OAK – Giorgio Tavecchio 20–yard field goal, 14:55. Raiders 10–7. **Drive: 15 plays, 73 yards, 7:03.**
- TEN – Ryan Succop 23–yard field goal, 0:43. Tied 10–10. **Drive: 15 plays, 93 yards, 6:20.**
- OAK – Giorgio Tavecchio 52–yard field goal, 0:00. Raiders 13–10. **Drive: 5 plays, 41 yards, 0:43.**

**Third quarter**

- OAK – Giorgio Tavecchio 52–yard field goal, 4:31. Raiders 16–10. **Drive: 8 plays, 29 yards, 4:11.**
- TEN – Ryan Succop 26–yard field goal, 0:00. Raiders 16–13. **Drive: 9 plays, 67 yards, 4:31.**

**Fourth quarter**

- OAK – Seth Roberts 19–yard pass from Derek Carr (Giorgio Tavecchio kick), 11:58. Raiders 23–13. **Drive: 7 plays, 70 yards, 3:02.**
- TEN – Ryan Succop 52–yard field goal, 4:49. Raiders 23–16. **Drive: 8 plays, 46 yards, 1:55.**
- OAK – Giorgio Tavecchio 43–yard field goal, 1:09. Raiders 26–16. **Drive: 9 plays, 34 yards, 3:40.**

**Top passers**

- OAK – Derek Carr – 22/32, 262 yards, 2 TD
- TEN – Marcus Mariota – 25/41, 256 yards

**Top rushers**

- OAK – Marshawn Lynch – 18 rushes, 76 yards
- TEN – DeMarco Murray – 12 rushes, 44 yards

**Top receivers**

- OAK – Michael Crabtree – 6 receptions, 83 yards
- TEN – Delanie Walker – 7 receptions, 76 yards

==== Week 2: at Jacksonville Jaguars ====
Week Two: Tennessee Titans at Jacksonville Jaguars – Game summary

Quarter	1	2	3	4	Total
**Titans**	3	3	17	14	**37**
Jaguars	3	0	0	13	**16**

at EverBank Field, Jacksonville, Florida

- Date: September 17
- Game time: 1:00 p.m. EDT/12:00 p.m. CDT
- Game weather: 84 °F (29 °C), partly cloudy
- Game attendance: 61,709
- Referee: Ed Hochuli
- TV announcers (CBS): Spero Dedes and Adam Archuleta
- Recap, Gamebook

Game information

**First quarter**

- JAX – Jason Myers 43–yard field goal, 7:24. Jaguars 3–0. **Drive: 11 plays, 53 yards, 6:01.**
- TEN – Ryan Succop 40–yard field goal, 2:16. Tied 3–3. **Drive: 11 plays, 53 yards, 5:08.**

**Second quarter**

- TEN – Ryan Succop 41–yard field goal, 0:00. Titans 6–3. **Drive: 10 plays, 38 yards, 2:13.**

**Third quarter**

- TEN – Ryan Succop 26–yard field goal, 9:24. Titans 9–3. **Drive: 10 plays, 31 yards, 4:40.**
- TEN – Derrick Henry 17–yard run (Ryan Succop kick), 6:36. Titans 16–3. **Drive: 2 plays, 34 yards, 0:46.**
- TEN – Delanie Walker 1–yard run (Ryan Succop kick), 2:49. Titans 23–3. **Drive: 3 plays, 49 yards, 1:34.**

**Fourth quarter**

- TEN – Jonnu Smith 32–yard pass from Marcus Mariota (Ryan Succop kick), 9:57. Titans 30–3. **Drive: 8 plays, 86 yards, 5:19.**
- JAX – Leonard Fournette 1–yard run (pass failed), 7:12. Titans 30–9. **Drive: 6 plays, 75 yards, 2:45.**
- TEN – Jalston Fowler 3–yard run (Ryan Succop kick), 4:14. Titans 37–9. **Drive: 6 plays, 25 yards, 2:58.**
- JAX – Allen Hurns 7–yard pass from Blake Bortles (Jason Myers kick), 2:11. Titans 37–16. **Drive: 6 plays, 77 yards, 2:03.**

**Top passers**

- TEN – Marcus Mariota – 15/27, 215 yards, TD, INT
- JAX – Blake Bortles – 20/34, 223 yards, TD, 2 INT

**Top rushers**

- TEN – Derrick Henry – 14 rushes, 92 yards, TD
- JAX – Leonard Fournette – 14 rushes, 40 yards, TD

**Top receivers**

- TEN – Delanie Walker – 4 receptions, 61 yards
- JAX – Allen Hurns – 7 receptions, 82 yards, TD

==== Week 3: vs. Seattle Seahawks ====
Week Three: Seattle Seahawks at Tennessee Titans – Game summary

Quarter	1	2	3	4	Total
Seahawks	0	7	7	13	**27**
**Titans**	0	9	21	3	**33**

at Nissan Stadium, Nashville, Tennessee

- Date: September 24
- Game time: 3:05 p.m. CDT
- Game weather: 88 °F (31 °C), sunny
- Game attendance: 69,127
- Referee: Ronald Torbert
- TV announcers (Fox): Kevin Burkhardt, Charles Davis and Pam Oliver
- Recap, Gamebook

Game information

**First quarter**

- No scoring plays

**Second quarter**

- TEN – Ryan Succop 24–yard field goal, 13:23. Titans 3–0. **Drive: 11 plays, 61 yards, 5:20.**
- TEN – Ryan Succop 37–yard field goal, 5:51. Titans 6–0. **Drive: 12 plays, 49 yards, 6:30.**
- SEA – Doug Baldwin 4–yard pass from Russell Wilson (Blair Walsh kick), 1:15. Seahawks 7–6. **Drive: 5 plays, 86 yards, 0:49.**
- TEN – Ryan Succop 47–yard field goal, 0:00. Titans 9–7. **Drive: 8 plays, 47 yards, 1:15.**

**Third quarter**

- SEA – Chris Carson 10–yard pass from Russell Wilson (Blair Walsh kick), 10:09. Seahawks 14–9. **Drive: 9 plays, 75 yards, 4:51.**
- TEN – Rishard Matthews 55–yard pass from Marcus Mariota (Ryan Succop kick), 7:34. Titans 16–14. **Drive: 4 plays, 75 yards, 2:35.**
- TEN – Jonnu Smith 24–yard pass from Marcus Mariota (Ryan Succop kick), 3:50. Titans 23–14. **Drive: 5 plays, 54 yards, 2:40.**
- TEN – DeMarco Murray 75–yard run (Ryan Succop kick), 1:34. Titans 30–14. **Drive: 1 plays, 75 yards, 0:15.**

**Fourth quarter**

- SEA – Luke Willson 27–yard pass from Russell Wilson (pass failed), 13:59. Titans 30–20. **Drive: 8 plays, 75 yards, 2:35.**
- TEN – Ryan Succop 35–yard field goal, 10:00. Titans 33–20. **Drive: 8 plays, 58 yards, 3:59.**
- SEA – Paul Richardson 8–yard pass from Russell Wilson (Blair Walsh kick), 1:50. Titans 33–27. **Drive: 12 plays, 72 yards, 3:19.**

**Top passers**

- SEA – Russell Wilson – 29/49, 373 yards, 4 TD
- TEN – Marcus Mariota – 20/32, 225 yards, 2 TD

**Top rushers**

- SEA – Chris Carson – 11 rushes, 34 yards
- TEN – DeMarco Murray – 14 rushes, 115 yards, TD

**Top receivers**

- SEA – Doug Baldwin – 10 receptions, 105 yards, TD
- TEN – Rishard Matthews – 6 receptions, 87 yards, TD

==== Week 4: at Houston Texans ====
Week Four: Tennessee Titans at Houston Texans – Game summary

Quarter	1	2	3	4	Total
Titans	0	14	0	0	**14**
**Texans**	14	16	7	20	**57**

at NRG Stadium, Houston, Texas

- Date: October 1
- Game time: 12:00 p.m. CDT
- Game weather: Played indoors (retractable roof closed)
- Game attendance: 71,804
- Referee: Jeff Triplette
- TV announcers (CBS): Kevin Harlan and Rich Gannon
- Recap, Gamebook

Game information

**First quarter**

- HOU – Lamar Miller 2-yard run (Kaʻimi Fairbairn kick), 12:13. Texans 7–0. **Drive: 4 plays, 43 yards, 1:48.**
- HOU – DeAndre Hopkins 8-yard pass from Deshaun Watson (Kaʻimi Fairbairn kick), 5:09. Texans 14–0. **Drive: 11 plays, 76 yards, 5:07.**

**Second quarter**

- HOU – Will Fuller 16-yard pass from Deshaun Watson (Kaʻimi Fairbairn kick), 14:54. Texans 21–0. **Drive: 9 plays, 76 yards, 3:47.**
- TEN – Marcus Mariota 34-yard run (Ryan Succop kick), 11:44. Texans 21–7. **Drive: 5 plays, 75 yards, 3:10.**
- HOU – Kaʻimi Fairbairn 50-yard field goal, 6:06. Texans 24–7. **Drive: 12 plays, 43 yards, 5:38.**
- TEN – Marcus Mariota 2-yard run (Ryan Succop kick), 1:50. Texans 24–14. **Drive: 7 plays, 75 yards, 4:11.**
- HOU – Deshaun Watson 1-yard run (kick failed), 1:19. Texans 30–14. **Drive: 1 play, 58 yards, 0:31.**

**Third quarter**

- HOU – Will Fuller 10-yard pass from Deshaun Watson (Kaʻimi Fairbairn kick), 6:51. Texans 37–14. **Drive: 14 plays, 75 yards, 8:09.**

**Fourth quarter**

- HOU – Lamar Miller 8-yard pass from Deshaun Watson (Kaʻimi Fairbairn kick), 11:19. Texans 44–14. **Drive: 9 plays, 73 yards, 5:27.**
- HOU – Kaʻimi Fairbairn 40-yard field goal, 8:44. Texans 47–14. **Drive: 5 plays, 20 yards, 2:11.**
- HOU – Dylan Cole 25-yard interception return (Kaʻimi Fairbairn kick), 8:31. Texans 54–14. **Drive: 1 play, 0 yards, 0:08.**
- HOU – Kaʻimi Fairbairn 33-yard field goal, 3:39. Texans 57–14. **Drive: 3 plays, 0 yards, 1:24.**

**Top passers**

- TEN – Marcus Mariota – 6/10, 96 yards, 2 INT
- HOU – Deshaun Watson – 25/34, 283 yards, 4 TD, INT

**Top rushers**

- TEN – Marcus Mariota – 4 carries, 39 yards, 2 TD
- HOU – Lamar Miller – 19 carries, 75 yards, TD

**Top receivers**

- TEN – Delanie Walker – 3 receptions, 51 yards
- HOU – DeAndre Hopkins – 10 receptions, 107 yards, TD

==== Week 5: at Miami Dolphins ====
Week Five: Tennessee Titans at Miami Dolphins – Game summary

Quarter	1	2	3	4	Total
Titans	0	3	7	0	**10**
**Dolphins**	10	0	0	6	**16**

at Hard Rock Stadium, Miami Gardens, Florida

- Date: October 8
- Game time: 1:00 p.m. EDT/12:00 p.m. CDT
- Game weather: 89 °F (32 °C), partly cloudy
- Game attendance: 65,135
- Referee: Bill Vinovich
- TV announcers (CBS): Andrew Catalon and James Lofton
- Recap, Gamebook

Game information

**First quarter**

- MIA – Cody Parkey 41-yard field goal, 0:43. Dolphins 3–0. **Drive: 7 plays, 19 yards, 3:09.**
- MIA – Reshad Jones 38-yard fumble return (Cody Parkey kick), 0:06. Dolphins 10–0.

**Second quarter**

- TEN – Ryan Succop 45-yard field goal, 9:37. Dolphins 10–3. **Drive: 4 plays, 13 yards, 2:15.**

**Third quarter**

- TEN – Phillip Supernaw 11-yard pass from Matt Cassel (Ryan Succop kick), 7:17. Tied 10–10. **Drive: 9 plays, 69 yards, 4:42.**

**Fourth quarter**

- MIA – Jarvis Landry 6-yard pass from Jay Cutler (kick failed), 10:33. Dolphins 16–10. **Drive: 10 plays, 58 yards, 4:56.**

**Top passers**

- TEN – Matt Cassel – 21/32, 141 yards, TD
- MIA – Jay Cutler – 12/26, 92 yards, TD, INT

**Top rushers**

- TEN – DeMarco Murray – 14 carries, 58 yards
- MIA – Jay Ajayi – 25 carries, 77 yards

**Top receivers**

- TEN – Jonnu Smith – 5 receptions, 21 yards
- MIA – Jarvis Landry – 5 receptions, 44 yards, TD

Phillip Supernaw caught his first career touchdown.

==== Week 6: vs. Indianapolis Colts ====
Week Six: Indianapolis Colts at Tennessee Titans – Game summary

Quarter	1	2	3	4	Total
Colts	3	10	6	3	**22**
**Titans**	6	3	6	21	**36**

at Nissan Stadium, Nashville, Tennessee

- Date: October 16
- Game time: 7:30 p.m. CDT
- Game weather: 57 °F (14 °C), clear
- Game attendance: 63,888
- Referee: Walt Anderson
- TV announcers (ESPN): Sean McDonough, Jon Gruden and Lisa Salters
- Recap, Gamebook

Game information

**First quarter**

- TEN – Ryan Succop 48-yard field goal, 11:15. Titans 3–0. **Drive: 8 plays, 30 yards, 3:45.**
- IND – Adam Vinatieri 36-yard field goal, 6:45. Tied 3–3. **Drive: 9 plays, 52 yards, 4:30.**
- TEN – Ryan Succop 32-yard field goal, 0:47. Titans 6–3. **Drive: 10 plays, 61 yards, 5:58.**

**Second quarter**

- IND – Jack Doyle 8-yard pass from Jacoby Brissett (Adam Vinatieri kick), 10:54. Colts 10–6. **Drive: 9 plays, 73 yards, 4:53.**
- TEN – Ryan Succop 40-yard field goal, 4:10. Colts 10–9. **Drive: 12 plays, 72 yards, 6:44.**
- IND – Adam Vinatieri 25-yard field goal, 0:14. Colts 13–9. **Drive: 12 plays, 69 yards, 3:56.**

**Third quarter**

- IND – John Simon 26-yard interception return (kick failed), 13:50. Colts 19–9.
- TEN – Ryan Succop 48-yard field goal, 9:43. Colts 19–12. **Drive: 8 plays, 45 yards, 4:07.**
- TEN – Ryan Succop 23-yard field goal, 4:35. Colts 19–15. **Drive: 5 plays, 26 yards, 2:03.**

**Fourth quarter**

- TEN – DeMarco Murray 3-yard run (Ryan Succop kick), 10:01. Titans 22–19. **Drive: 15 plays, 87 yards, 8:24.**
- IND – Adam Vinatieri 52-yard field goal, 7:27. Tied 22–22. **Drive: 6 plays, 6 yards, 2:34.**
- TEN – Taywan Taylor 53-yard pass from Marcus Mariota (Ryan Succop kick), 5:29. Titans 29–22. **Drive: 4 plays, 75 yards, 1:58.**
- TEN – Derrick Henry 72-yard run (Ryan Succop kick), 0:47. Titans 36–22. **Drive: 5 plays, 87 yards, 1:32.**

**Top passers**

- IND – Jacoby Brissett – 21/37, 212 yards, 1 TD
- TEN – Marcus Mariota – 23/32, 306 yards, 1 TD, 1 INT

**Top rushers**

- IND – Frank Gore – 10 rushes, 49 yards
- TEN – Derrick Henry – 19 rushes, 131 yards, 1 TD

**Top receivers**

- IND – Jack Doyle – 7 receptions, 50 yards, 1 TD
- TEN – Eric Decker – 7 receptions, 88 yards

Rookie Taywan Taylor caught his first career touchdown.

==== Week 7: at Cleveland Browns ====
Week Seven: Tennessee Titans at Cleveland Browns – Game summary

Quarter	1	2	3	4	OT	Total
**Titans**	3	3	0	3	3	**12**
Browns	0	3	3	3	0	**9**

at FirstEnergy Stadium, Cleveland, Ohio

- Date: October 22
- Game time: 1:00 p.m. EDT/12:00 p.m. CDT
- Game weather: 74 °F (23 °C), sunny
- Game attendance: 59,061
- Referee: Terry McAulay
- TV announcers (CBS): Spero Dedes and Adam Archuleta
- Recap, Gamebook

Game information

**First quarter**

- TEN – Ryan Succop 43–yard field goal, 8:38. Titans 3–0. **Drive: 11 plays, 45 yards, 6:22.**

**Second quarter**

- CLE – Zane Gonzalez 31–yard field goal, 8:31. Tied 3–3. **Drive: 7 plays, 27 yards, 3:40.**
- TEN – Ryan Succop 23–yard field goal, 1:37. Titans 6–3. **Drive: 14 plays, 70 yards, 6:54.**

**Third quarter**

- CLE – Zane Gonzalez 47–yard field goal, 4:25. Tied 6–6. **Drive: 10 plays, 70 yards, 5:07.**

**Fourth quarter**

- TEN – Ryan Succop 46–yard field goal, 14:50. Titans 9–6. **Drive: 9 plays, 47 yards, 4:35.**
- CLE – Zane Gonzalez 54–yard field goal, 0:47. Tied 9–9. **Drive: 10 plays, 31 yards, 3:30.**

**Overtime**

- TEN – Ryan Succop 47–yard field goal, 2:00. Titans 12–9. **Drive: 7 plays, 20 yards, 5:57.**

**Top passers**

- TEN – Marcus Mariota – 21/34, 203 yards
- CLE – Cody Kessler – 10/19, 121 yards, INT

**Top rushers**

- TEN – DeMarco Murray – 18 rushes, 59 yards
- CLE – Isaiah Crowell – 17 rushes, 35 yards

**Top receivers**

- TEN – Delanie Walker – 7 receptions, 63 yards
- CLE – Duke Johnson – 6 receptions, 45 yards

==== Week 9: vs. Baltimore Ravens ====
Week Nine: Baltimore Ravens at Tennessee Titans – Game summary

Quarter	1	2	3	4	Total
Ravens	3	3	0	14	**20**
**Titans**	10	6	0	7	**23**

at Nissan Stadium, Nashville, Tennessee

- Date: November 5
- Game time: 12:00 p.m. CST
- Game weather: 75 °F (24 °C), cloudy
- Game attendance: 67,322
- Referee: John Hussey
- TV announcers (CBS): Kevin Harlan, Rich Gannon and Melanie Collins
- Recap, Gamebook

Game information

**First quarter**

- TEN – Ryan Succop 48 yard field goal, 11:04. Titans 3–0. **Drive: 7 plays, 45 yards, 4:02.**
- BAL – Justin Tucker 30 yard field goal, 6:03. Tied 3–3. **Drive: 12 plays, 63 yards, 4:59.**
- TEN – Rishard Matthews 16 yard pass from Marcus Mariota (Ryan Succop kick), 4:04. Titans 10–3. **Drive: 3 plays, 46 yards, 1:21.**

**Second quarter**

- BAL – Justin Tucker 49 yard field goal, 10:01. Titans 10–6. **Drive: 13 plays, 44 yards, 6:08.**
- TEN – Derrick Henry 1 yard run (kick failed), 2:24. Titans 16–6. **Drive: 7 plays, 26 yards, 3:10.**

**Third quarter**

- No scoring plays

**Fourth quarter**

- BAL – Javorius Allen 3 yard pass form Joe Flacco (Justin Tucker kick), 8:56. Titans 16–13. **Drive: 6 plays, 42 yards, 2:55.**
- TEN – Eric Decker 11 yard pass form Marcus Mariota (Ryan Succop kick), 4:04. Titans 23–13. **Drive: 9 plays, 75 yards, 4:58.**
- BAL – Mike Wallace 1 yard pass from Joe Flacco (Justin Tucker kick), 0:46. Titans 23–20. **Drive: 16 plays, 75 yards, 3:12.**

**Top passers**

- BAL – Joe Flacco – 34/52, 261 yards, 2 TD, 2 INT
- TEN – Marcus Mariota – 19/28, 218 yards, 2 TD, INT

**Top rushers**

- BAL – Alex Collins – 13 rushes, 43 yards
- TEN – Derrick Henry – 8 rushes, 26 yards, TD

**Top receivers**

- BAL – Jeremy Maclin – 8 receptions, 98 yards
- TEN – Delanie Walker – 5 receptions, 71 yards

==== Week 10: vs. Cincinnati Bengals ====
Week Ten: Cincinnati Bengals at Tennessee Titans – Game summary

Quarter	1	2	3	4	Total
Bengals	6	7	0	7	**20**
**Titans**	7	10	0	7	**24**

at Nissan Stadium, Nashville, Tennessee

- Date: November 12
- Game time: 12:00 p.m. CST
- Game weather: 53 °F (12 °C), cloudy
- Game attendance: 67,432
- Referee: Jeff Triplette
- TV announcers (Fox): Dick Stockton, Mark Schlereth and Shannon Spake
- Recap, Gamebook

Game information

**First quarter**

- TEN – DeMarco Murray 2–yard run (Ryan Succop kick), 7:56. Titans 7–0. **Drive: 10 plays, 84 yards, 5:25.**
- CIN – Brandon LaFell 37–yard pass from Andy Dalton (kick failed, wl), 4:44. Titans 7–6. **Drive: 8 plays, 75 yards, 3:12.**

**Second quarter**

- TEN – DeMarco Murray 1–yard run (Ryan Succop kick), 5:08. Titans 14–6. **Drive: 5 plays, 27 yards, 1:31.**
- CIN – Joe Mixon 3–yard run (Randy Bullock kick), 1:42. Titans 14–13. **Drive: 1 play, 3 yards, 0:04.**
- TEN – Ryan Succop 44–yard field goal, 0:00. Titans 17–13. **Drive: 10 plays, 53 yards, 1:42.**

**Third quarter**

- No scoring plays

**Fourth quarter**

- CIN – A. J. Green 70–yard pass from Andy Dalton (Randy Bullock kick), 5:03. Bengals 20–17. **Drive: 2 plays, 82 yards, 0:41.**
- TEN – DeMarco Murray 7–yard pass from Marcus Mariota (Ryan Succop kick), 0:36. Titans 24–20. **Drive: 12 plays, 73 yards, 4:27.**

**Top passers**

- CIN – Andy Dalton – 20/35, 265 yards, 2 TD
- TEN – Marcus Mariota – 25/44, 264 yards, TD, INT

**Top rushers**

- CIN – Joe Mixon – 9 rushes, 37 yards, TD
- TEN – DeMarco Murray – 14 rushes, 42 yards, 2 TD

**Top receivers**

- CIN – A. J. Green – 5 receptions, 115 yards, TD
- TEN – Delanie Walker – 6 receptions, 63 yards

==== Week 11: at Pittsburgh Steelers ====
Week Eleven: Tennessee Titans at Pittsburgh Steelers – Game summary

Quarter	1	2	3	4	Total
Titans	7	0	10	0	**17**
**Steelers**	10	6	7	17	**40**

at Heinz Field, Pittsburgh, Pennsylvania

- Date: November 16
- Game time: 8:25 p.m. EST/7:25 p.m. CST
- Game weather: 40 °F (4 °C), cloudy
- Game attendance: 60,703
- Referee: Ronald Torbert
- TV announcers (NBC/NFLN/Amazon Video): Mike Tirico, Cris Collinsworth and Heather Cox
- Recap, Gamebook

Game information

**First quarter**

- PIT – Antonio Brown 41-yard pass from Ben Roethlisberger (Chris Boswell kick), 12:33. Steelers 7–0. **Drive: 6 plays, 75 yards, 2:35.**
- PIT – Chris Boswell 41-yard field goal, 9:45. Steelers 10–0. **Drive: 5 plays, 1 yard, 1:46.**
- TEN – Marcus Mariota 7-yard run (Ryan Succop kick), 3:11. Steelers 10–7. **Drive: 11 plays, 68 yards, 6:36.**

**Second quarter**

- PIT – Chris Boswell 28-yard field goal, 1:39. Steelers 13–7. **Drive: 7 plays, 10 yards, 1:34.**
- PIT – Chris Boswell 50-yard field goal, 0:23. Steelers 16–7. **Drive: 7 plays, 35 yards, 0:53.**

**Third quarter**

- TEN – Rishard Matthews 75-yard pass from Marcus Mariota (Ryan Succop kick), 15:00. Steelers 16–14. **Drive: 1 play, 75 yards, 0:11.**
- PIT – Antonio Brown 5-yard pass from Ben Roethlisberger (Chris Boswell kick), 10:05. Steelers 23–14. **Drive: 10 plays, 75 yards, 4:48.**
- TEN – Ryan Succop 44-yard field goal, 5:38. Steelers 23–17. **Drive: 8 plays, 49 yards, 4:27.**

**Fourth quarter**

- PIT – Jesse James 1-yard pass from Ben Roethlisberger (Chris Boswell kick), 15:00. Steelers 30–17. **Drive: 12 plays, 75 yards, 5:38.**
- PIT – Antonio Brown 10-yard pass from Ben Roethlisberger (Chris Boswell kick), 12:18. Steelers 37–17. **Drive: 3 plays, 51 yards, 1:27.**
- PIT – Chris Boswell 26-yard field goal, 5:24. Steelers 40–17. **Drive: 10 plays, 44 yards, 6:18.**

**Top passers**

- TEN – Marcus Mariota – 22/33, 306 yards, TD, 4 INT
- PIT – Ben Roethlisberger – 30/45, 299 yards, 4 TD

**Top rushers**

- TEN – Derrick Henry – 7 rushes, 32 yards
- PIT – Le'Veon Bell – 12 rushes, 46 yards

**Top receivers**

- TEN – Rishard Matthews – 5 receptions, 113 yards, TD
- PIT – Antonio Brown – 10 receptions, 144 yards, 3 TD

==== Week 12: at Indianapolis Colts ====
Week Twelve: Tennessee Titans at Indianapolis Colts – Game summary

Quarter	1	2	3	4	Total
**Titans**	6	0	7	7	**20**
Colts	0	13	3	0	**16**

at Lucas Oil Stadium, Indianapolis, Indiana

- Date: November 26
- Game time: 1:00 p.m. EST/12:00 p.m. CST
- Game weather: 47 °F (8 °C), sunny — retractable roof open
- Game attendance: 62,207
- Referee: Craig Wrolstad
- TV announcers (Fox): Chris Myers, Daryl Johnston and Laura Okmin
- Recap, Gamebook

Game information

**First quarter**

- TEN – Ryan Succop 29-yard field goal, 7:54. Titans 3–0. **Drive: 11 plays, 53 yards, 6:09.**
- TEN – Ryan Succop 45-yard field goal, 1:52. Titans 6–0. **Drive: 5 plays, 37 yards, 3:23.**

**Second quarter**

- IND – Adam Vinatieri 26-yard field goal, 10:05. Titans 6–3. **Drive: 14 plays, 67 yards, 6:47.**
- IND – Adam Vinatieri 28-yard field goal, 2:07. Tied 6–6. **Drive: 11 plays, 45 yards, 6:25.**
- IND – Frank Gore 14-yard run (Adam Vinatieri kick), 0:38. Colts 13–6. **Drive: 6 plays, 34 yards, 1:16.**

**Third quarter**

- IND – Adam Vinatieri 42-yard field goal, 6:05. Colts 16–6. **Drive: 13 plays, 55 yards, 6:57.**
- TEN – Delanie Walker 2-yard pass from Marcus Mariota (Ryan Succop kick), 1:50. Colts 16–13. **Drive: 1 plays, 4 yards, 0:25.**

**Fourth quarter**

- TEN – DeMarco Murray 1-yard run (Ryan Succop kick), 5:59. Titans 20–16. **Drive: 9 plays, 77 yards, 5:25.**

**Top passers**

- TEN – Marcus Mariota – 17/25, 184 yards, TD, 2 INT
- IND – Jacoby Brissett – 17/29, 196 yards

**Top rushers**

- TEN – Derrick Henry – 13 carries, 79 yards
- IND – Frank Gore – 17 carries, 62 yards, TD

**Top receivers**

- TEN – Delonie Walker – 4 receptions, 63 yards, TD
- IND – Jack Doyle – 7 receptions, 94 yards

This was the Titans' first win in Indianapolis since 2007, and their first season sweep of Indy since 2002.

==== Week 13: vs. Houston Texans ====
Week Thirteen: Houston Texans at Tennessee Titans – Game summary

Quarter	1	2	3	4	Total
Texans	3	7	0	3	**13**
**Titans**	0	10	7	7	**24**

at Nissan Stadium, Nashville, Tennessee

- Date: December 3
- Game time: 12:00 p.m. CST
- Game weather: 60 °F (16 °C), sunny
- Game attendance: 62,758
- Referee: Clete Blakeman
- TV announcers (CBS): Greg Gumbel, Trent Green and Jamie Erdahl
- Recap, Gamebook

Game information

**First quarter**

- HOU – Kaʻimi Fairbairn 23-yard field goal, 9:25. Texans 3–0. **Drive: 9 plays, 36 yards, 3:39.**

**Second quarter**

- HOU – Stephen Anderson 4-yard pass from Tom Savage (Kaʻimi Fairbairn kick), 10:40. Texans 10–0. **Drive: 7 plays, 87 yards, 3:17.**
- TEN – Marcus Mariota 9-yard run (Ryan Succop kick), 4:18. Texans 10–7. **Drive: 10 plays, 75 yards, 6:22.**
- TEN – Ryan Succop 43-yard field goal, 0:04. Tied 10–10. **Drive: 4 plays, 37 yards, 0:35.**

**Third quarter**

- TEN – Delanie Walker 24-yard pass from Marcus Mariota (Ryan Succop kick), 0:03. Titans 17–10. **Drive: 10 plays, 80 yards, 5:17.**

**Fourth quarter**

- HOU – Kaʻimi Fairbairn 42-yard field goal, 4:42. Titans 17–13. **Drive: 12 plays, 57 yards, 6:49.**
- TEN – Derrick Henry 75-yard run (Ryan Succop kick), 0:46. Titans 24–13. **Drive: 3 plays, 80 yards, 0:22.**

**Top passers**

- HOU – Tom Savage – 31/49, 365 yards, TD, INT
- TEN – Marcus Mariota – 15/23, 150 yards, TD

**Top rushers**

- HOU – Lamar Miller – 15 carries, 56 yards
- TEN – Derrick Henry – 11 carries, 109 yards, TD

**Top receivers**

- HOU – DeAndre Hopkins – 8 receptions, 80 yards
- TEN – Delanie Walker – 5 receptions, 63 yards, TD

==== Week 14: at Arizona Cardinals ====
Week Fourteen: Tennessee Titans at Arizona Cardinals – Game summary

Quarter	1	2	3	4	Total
Titans	0	7	0	0	**7**
**Cardinals**	0	0	6	6	**12**

at University of Phoenix Stadium, Glendale, Arizona

- Date: December 10
- Game time: 3:05 p.m. CST/2:05 p.m. MST
- Game weather: Played indoors (retractable roof closed)
- Game attendance: 64,153
- Referee: Jerome Boger
- TV announcers (CBS): Andrew Catalon and James Lofton
- Recap, Gamebook

Game information

**First quarter**

- No scoring plays.

**Second quarter**

- TEN – Derrick Henry 6-yard run (Ryan Succop kick), 7:16. Titans 7–0. **Drive: 9 plays, 50 yards, 5:02.**

**Third quarter**

- ARI – Phil Dawson 47-yard field goal, 9:36. Titans 7–3. **Drive: 9 plays, 48 yards, 5:24.**
- ARI – Phil Dawson 23-yard field goal, 4:44. Titans 7–6. **Drive: 5 plays, 30 yards, 2:41.**

**Fourth quarter**

- ARI – Phil Dawson 32-yard field goal, 5:59. Cardinals 9–7. **Drive: 8 plays, 71 yards, 4:00.**
- ARI – Phil Dawson 35-yard field goal, 3:45. Cardinals 12–7. **Drive: 4 plays, 10 yards, 2:03.**

**Top passers**

- TEN – Marcus Mariota – 16/31, 159 yards, 2 INT
- ARI – Blaine Gabbert – 17/29, 178 yards

**Top rushers**

- TEN – DeMarco Murray – 11 carries, 34 yards
- ARI – Kerwynn Williams – 20 carries, 73 yards

**Top receivers**

- TEN – Delanie Walker – 5 receptions, 42 yards
- ARI – Larry Fitzgerald – 5 receptions, 44 yards

==== Week 15: at San Francisco 49ers ====
Week Fifteen: Tennessee Titans at San Francisco 49ers – Game summary

Quarter	1	2	3	4	Total
Titans	0	10	3	10	**23**
**49ers**	6	10	0	9	**25**

at Levi's Stadium, Santa Clara, California

- Date: December 17
- Game time: 3:25 p.m. CST/1:25 p.m. PST
- Game weather: 65 °F (18 °C), sunny
- Game attendance: 70,133
- Referee: John Parry
- TV announcers (CBS): Andrew Catalon and James Lofton
- Recap, Gamebook

Game information

**First quarter**

- SF – Robbie Gould 38-yard field goal, 8:51. 49ers 3–0. **Drive: 12 plays, 64 yards, 6:09.**
- SF – Robbie Gould 48-yard field goal, 4:35. 49ers 6–0. **Drive: 7 plays, 38 yards, 2:03.**

**Second quarter**

- TEN – Ryan Succop 40-yard field goal, 14:06. 49ers 6–3. **Drive: 12 plays, 53 yards, 5:29.**
- SF – Garrett Celek 5-yard pass from Jimmy Garoppolo (Robbie Gould kick), 5:30. 49ers 13–3. **Drive: 17 plays, 85 yards, 8:36.**
- SF – Robbie Gould 28-yard field goal, 1:37. 49ers 16–3. **Drive: 10 plays, 36 yards, 2:50.**
- TEN – Delanie Walker 4-yard pass from Marcus Mariota (Ryan Succop kick), 0:29. 49ers 16–10. **Drive: 6 plays, 79 yards, 1:08.**

**Third quarter**

- TEN – Ryan Succop 31-yard field goal, 8:29. 49ers 16–13. **Drive: 14 plays, 62 yards, 6:31.**

**Fourth quarter**

- TEN – Rishard Matthews 8-yard pass from Marcus Mariota (Ryan Succop kick), 13:31. Titans 20–16. **Drive: 12 plays, 84 yards, 7:01.**
- SF – Robbie Gould 50-yard field goal, 8:27. Titans 20–19. **Drive: 8 plays, 51 yards, 5:04.**
- SF – Robbie Gould 48-yard field goal, 3:08. 49ers 22–20. **Drive: 7 plays, 57 yards, 3:20.**
- TEN – Ryan Succop 50-yard field goal, 1:07. Titans 23–22. **Drive: 11 plays, 43 yards, 2:01.**
- SF – Robbie Gould 45-yard field goal, 0:00. 49ers 25–23. **Drive: 7 plays, 48 yards, 1:07.**

**Top passers**

- TEN – Marcus Mariota – 23/33, 241 yards, 2 TD
- SF – Jimmy Garoppolo – 31/43, 381 yards, TD

**Top rushers**

- TEN – DeMarco Murray – 18 carries, 59 yards
- SF – Carlos Hyde – 16 carries, 25 yards

**Top receivers**

- TEN – Rishard Matthews – 6 receptions, 95 yards, TD
- SF – Marquise Goodwin – 10 receptions, 114 yards

==== Week 16: vs. Los Angeles Rams ====
Week Sixteen: Los Angeles Rams at Tennessee Titans – Game summary

Quarter	1	2	3	4	Total
**Rams**	6	7	7	7	**27**
Titans	3	10	7	3	**23**

at Nissan Stadium, Nashville, Tennessee

- Date: December 24
- Game time: 12:00 p.m. CST
- Game weather: 39 °F (4 °C), cloudy
- Game attendance: 60,097
- Referee: Walt Anderson
- TV announcers (Fox): Chris Myers, Daryl Johnston and Laura Okmin
- Recap, Gamebook

Game information

**First quarter**

- LAR – Todd Gurley 3-yard pass from Jared Goff (kick failed), 8:54. Rams 6–0. **Drive: 4 plays, 53 yards, 2:07.**
- TEN – Ryan Succop 25-yard field goal, 1:13. Rams 6–3. **Drive: 14 plays, 62 yards, 7:41.**

**Second quarter**

- TEN – Wesley Woodyard 4-yard fumble return (Ryan Succop kick), 5:20. Titans 10–6.
- LAR – Todd Gurley 80-yard pass from Jared Goff (Sam Ficken kick), 4:24. Rams 13–10. **Drive: 2 plays, 79 yards, 0:56.**
- TEN – Ryan Succop 37-yard field goal, 0:19. Tied 13–13. **Drive: 11 plays, 56 yards, 4:05.**

**Third quarter**

- LAR – Sammy Watkins 3-yard pass from Jared Goff (Sam Ficken kick), 6:40. Rams 20–13. **Drive: 7 plays, 65 yards, 2:57.**
- TEN – DeMarco Murray 6-yard run (Ryan Succop kick), 4:23. Tied 20–20. **Drive: 5 plays, 44 yards, 2:17.**

**Fourth quarter**

- TEN – Ryan Succop 27-yard field goal, 14:46. Titans 23–20. **Drive: 9 plays, 64 yards, 3:40.**
- LAR – Cooper Kupp 14-yard pass from Jared Goff (Sam Ficken kick), 11:51. Rams 27–23. **Drive: 6 plays, 68 yards, 2:55.**

**Top passers**

- LAR – Jared Goff – 22/38, 301 yards, 4 TD
- TEN – Marcus Mariota – 22/39, 275 yards, INT

**Top rushers**

- LAR – Todd Gurley – 22 carries, 118 yards
- TEN – DeMarco Murray – 15 carries, 48 yards, TD

**Top receivers**

- LAR – Todd Gurley – 10 receptions, 158 yards, 2 TD
- TEN – Corey Davis – 6 receptions, 91 yards

==== Week 17: vs. Jacksonville Jaguars ====
Week Seventeen: Jacksonville Jaguars at Tennessee Titans – Game summary

Quarter	1	2	3	4	Total
Jaguars	0	3	0	7	**10**
**Titans**	0	12	3	0	**15**

at Nissan Stadium, Nashville, Tennessee

- Date: December 31
- Game time: 3:25 p.m. CST
- Game weather: 23 °F (−5 °C), clear
- Game attendance: 65,501
- Referee: Tony Corrente
- TV announcers (CBS): Greg Gumbel, Trent Green and Jamie Erdahl
- Recap, Gamebook

Game information

**First quarter**

- No scoring plays

**Second quarter**

- TEN – Derrick Henry 66-yard pass from Marcus Mariota (Ryan Succop kick blocked), 14:17. Titans 6–0. **Drive: 7 plays, 82 yards, 3:46.**
- JAX – Josh Lambo 41-yard field goal, 10:19. Titans 6–3. **Drive: 9 plays, 58 yards, 3:50.**
- TEN – Ryan Succop 25-yard field goal, 1:26. Titans 9–3. **Drive: 4 plays, 4 yards, 0:28.**
- TEN – Ryan Succop 39-yard field goal, 0:03. Titans 12–3. **Drive: 4 plays, 7 yards, 1:07.**

**Third quarter**

- TEN – Ryan Succop 38-yard field goal, 7:47. Titans 15–3. **Drive: 8 plays, 23 yards, 4:18.**

**Fourth quarter**

- JAX – Yannick Ngakoue 67-yard fumble return (Josh Lambo kick), 11:02 Titans 15–10.

**Top passers**

- JAX – Blake Bortles – 15/34, 158 yards, 2 INT
- TEN – Marcus Mariota – 12/21, 134 yards, TD

**Top rushers**

- JAX – Leonard Fournette – 19 rushes, 69 yards
- TEN – Marcus Mariota – 10 rushes, 60 yards

**Top receivers**

- JAX – Leonard Fournette – 4 receptions, 67 yards
- TEN – Derrick Henry – 1 reception, 66 yards, TD

With the win, the Titans clinched their first playoff berth since 2008.

=== Standings ===
==== Division ====
AFC South
	W	L	T	PCT	DIV	CONF	PF	PA	STK
^{(3)} Jacksonville Jaguars	10	6	0	.625	4–2	9–3	417	268	L2
^{(5)} Tennessee Titans	9	7	0	.563	5–1	8–4	334	356	W1
Indianapolis Colts	4	12	0	.250	2–4	3–9	263	404	W1
Houston Texans	4	12	0	.250	1–5	3–9	338	436	L6

==== Conference ====
AFC
#	Team	Division	W	L	T	PCT	DIV	CONF	SOS	SOV	STK
**Division leaders**
1 (Note: New England claimed the No. 1 seed over Pittsburgh based on head-to-head victory.)	New England Patriots	East	13	3	0	.813	5–1	10–2	.484	.466	W3
2	Pittsburgh Steelers	North	13	3	0	.813	6–0	10–2	.453	.423	W2
3 (Note: Jacksonville claimed the No. 3 seed over Kansas City based on conference record.)	Jacksonville Jaguars	South	10	6	0	.625	4–2	9–3	.434	.394	L2
4	Kansas City Chiefs	West	10	6	0	.625	5–1	8–4	.477	.481	W4
**Wild Cards**
5 (Note: Tennessee finished ahead of Buffalo, Baltimore and Los Angeles Chargers based on conference record, claiming the No. 5 seed. Buffalo and Baltimore finished ahead of Los Angeles Chargers based on conference record. Buffalo claimed the No. 6 seed over Baltimore based on strength of victory.)	Tennessee Titans	South	9	7	0	.563	5–1	8–4	.434	.396	W1
6	Buffalo Bills	East	9	7	0	.563	3–3	7–5	.492	.396	W1
**Did not qualify for the postseason**
7	Baltimore Ravens	North	9	7	0	.563	3–3	7–5	.441	.299	L1
8	Los Angeles Chargers	West	9	7	0	.563	3–3	6–6	.457	.347	W2
9	Cincinnati Bengals	North	7	9	0	.438	3–3	6–6	.465	.321	W2
10 (Note: Oakland finished ahead of Miami based on head-to-head victory.)	Oakland Raiders	West	6	10	0	.375	2–4	5–7	.512	.396	L4
11	Miami Dolphins	East	6	10	0	.375	2–4	5–7	.543	.531	L3
12 (Note: Denver finished ahead of the New York Jets based on head-to-head victory.)	Denver Broncos	West	5	11	0	.313	2–4	4–8	.492	.413	L2
13	New York Jets	East	5	11	0	.313	2–4	5–7	.520	.438	L4
14 (Note: Indianapolis finished ahead of Houston based on head-to-head sweep.)	Indianapolis Colts	South	4	12	0	.250	2–4	3–9	.480	.219	W1
15	Houston Texans	South	4	12	0	.250	1–5	3–9	.516	.375	L6
16	Cleveland Browns	North	0	16	0	.000	0–6	0–12	.520	–	L16
**Tiebreakers** (Note: When breaking ties for three or more teams under the NFL's rules, they are first broken within divisions, then comparing only the highest ranked remaining team from each division.)

== Postseason ==
Round	Date	Opponent (seed)	Result	Record	Venue	Recap
Wild Card	January 6, 2018	at Kansas City Chiefs (4)	W 22–21	1–0	Arrowhead Stadium	Recap
Divisional	January 13, 2018	at New England Patriots (1)	L 14–35	1–1	Gillette Stadium	Recap

=== Game summaries ===
==== AFC Wild Card Playoffs: at (4) Kansas City Chiefs ====
AFC Wild Card Playoffs: (5) Tennessee Titans at (4) Kansas City Chiefs – Game summary

Quarter	1	2	3	4	Total
Titans	0	3	7	12	22
Chiefs	14	7	0	0	21

at Arrowhead Stadium, Kansas City, Missouri

- Date: January 6, 2018
- Game time: 3:35 p.m. CST
- Game weather: 33 °F (1 °C), sunny
- Game attendance: 73,319
- Referee: Jeff Triplette
- TV announcers (ESPN/ABC): Sean McDonough, Jon Gruden and Lisa Salters
- Recap, Gamebook

Game information

1st quarter

- KC – Kareem Hunt 1-yard run (Harrison Butker kick), 7:07. Chiefs 7–0. Drive: 6 plays, 81 yards, 2:56.
- KC – Travis Kelce 13-yard pass from Alex Smith (Harrison Butker kick), 2:15. Chiefs 14–0. Drive: 5 plays, 76 yards, 3:24.

2nd quarter

- TEN – Ryan Succop 49-yard field goal, 1:55. Chiefs 14–3. Drive: 8 plays, 48 yards, 4:02.
- KC – Demarcus Robinson 14-yard pass from Alex Smith (Harrison Butker kick), 0:03. Chiefs 21–3. Drive: 9 plays, 79 yards, 1:52.

3rd quarter

- TEN – Marcus Mariota 6-yard pass from Marcus Mariota (Ryan Succop kick), 6:31. Chiefs 21–10. Drive: 15 plays, 91 yards, 8:29.

4th quarter

- TEN – Derrick Henry 35-yard run (pass failed), 14:08. Chiefs 21–16. Drive: 6 plays, 62 yards, 3:17.
- TEN – Eric Decker 22-yard pass from Marcus Mariota (pass failed), 6:06. Titans 22–21. Drive: 11 plays, 80 yards, 5:09.

Top passers

- TEN – Marcus Mariota — 19/31, 205 yards, 2 TD, INT
- KC – Alex Smith — 24/33, 264 yards, 2 TD

Top rushers

- TEN – Derrick Henry — 23 rushes, 156 yards, TD
- KC – Kareem Hunt — 11 rushes, 42 yards, TD

Top receivers

- TEN – Delanie Walker — 6 receptions, 74 yards
- KC – Tyreek Hill — 7 receptions, 87 yards

Despite struggling in the first half of the game and falling behind 21–3, the Titans shut out the Chiefs in the second half and won their first playoff game since 2003. In addition, Marcus Mariota became the first quarterback in NFL playoff history to throw a touchdown to himself.

This was Tennessee’s first playoff win since 2003.

==== AFC Divisional Playoffs: at (1) New England Patriots ====
AFC Divisional Playoffs: (5) Tennessee Titans at (1) New England Patriots – Game summary

Quarter	1	2	3	4	Total
Titans	7	0	0	7	14
Patriots	0	21	7	7	35

at Gillette Stadium, Foxborough, Massachusetts

- Date: January 13, 2018
- Game time: 8:15 p.m. EST/7:15 p.m. CST
- Game weather: 24 °F (−4 °C), clear and cold
- Game attendance: 65,878
- Referee: Ronald Torbert
- TV announcers (CBS): Jim Nantz, Tony Romo, Tracy Wolfson and Jay Feely
- Recap, Gamebook

Game information

1st quarter

- TEN – Corey Davis 15-yard pass from Marcus Mariota (Ryan Succop kick), 1:14. Titans 7–0. Drive: 11 plays, 95 yards, 5:17.

2nd quarter

- NE – James White 5-yard pass from Tom Brady (Stephen Gostkowski kick), 13:18. Tied 7–7. Drive: 7 plays, 73 yards, 2:56.
- NE – James White 6-yard run (Stephen Gostkowski kick), 9:20. Patriots 14–7. Drive: 6 plays, 48 yards, 1:56.
- NE – Chris Hogan 4-yard pass from Tom Brady (Stephen Gostkowski kick), 1:52. Patriots 21–7. Drive: 16 plays, 91 yards, 5:18.

3rd quarter

- NE – Brandon Bolden 2-yard run (Stephen Gostkowski kick), 4:02. Patriots 28–7. Drive: 9 plays, 56 yards, 4:20.

4th quarter

- NE – Rob Gronkowski 4-yard pass from Tom Brady (Stephen Gostkowski kick), 10:22. Patriots 35–7. Drive: 15 plays, 90 yards, 6:58.
- TEN – Corey Davis 11-yard pass from Marcus Mariota (Ryan Succop kick), 1:55. Patriots 35–14. Drive: 16 plays, 80 yards, 3:53.

Top passers

- TEN – Marcus Mariota – 22/37, 254 yards, 2 TD
- NE – Tom Brady – 35/53, 337 yards, 3 TD

Top rushers

- TEN – Marcus Mariota – 4 rushes, 37 yards
- NE – Dion Lewis – 15 rushes, 62 yards

Top receivers

- TEN – Eric Decker – 6 receptions, 85 yards
- NE – Danny Amendola – 11 receptions, 112 yards

Rookie Corey Davis caught his first career touchdowns. These would not be enough, however, as the top-seeded/defending champion Patriots steamrolled the Titans, 35-14. With the loss, the Titans' season ended, with a record of 10-8. With the Patriots losing to the Eagles three weeks later in Super Bowl LII, the Titans would have the third-longest championship drought of any team in the NFL, going back to 1961 when they were the Houston Oilers.
