= West Port High School =

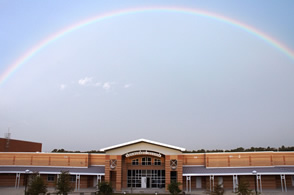
- West Port High School in 2010

Location
- 3733 SW 80th Avenue; Ocala, Florida
- 29°09′14″N 82°14′57″W

Information
- Type: Public secondary
- Established: 2000
- School district: Marion County Public Schools
- Principal: Ginger Cruze
- Teaching staff: 109.00 (FTE)
- Grades: 9–12
- Enrollment: 2,997 (2023-2024)
- Student to teacher ratio: 27.50
- Colors: Black, teal and silver
- Mascot: Wolfy
- Nickname: Wolf Pack
- Accreditation: Florida State Department of Education
- Website: wph.marionschools.net

West Port High School is an American high school in Ocala, Florida and one of eight public high schools in Marion County. Founded in 2000 and built at 3733 SW 80th Avenue, it is the district high school for West Ocala. The campus formerly housed both West Port Middle and High Schools. The middle school moved in 2008 after Liberty Middle School was built. As of the 2024–2025 school year, there were about 3,900 students attending West Port High School, making it the school in the district with the most students. West Port also has the largest campus by area in the district.

== Notable alumni ==
- Jason Schappert, an aviator
- Jonnu Smith, NFL tight end for the Pittsburgh Steelers.
- David Rau, former Wage War drummer and a former teacher at the school
