= Phillip Supernaw =

American football player (born 1990)

No. 48, 84, 89
- Position: Tight end

Personal information
- Born: January 30, 1990 (age 36); Nashville, Tennessee, U.S.
- Listed height: 6 ft 5 in (1.96 m)
- Listed weight: 252 lb (114 kg)

Career information
- High school: James E. Taylor (Katy, Texas)
- College: Ouachita Baptist
- NFL draft: 2012: undrafted

Career history
- Houston Texans (2012–2013); Baltimore Ravens (2014); Kansas City Chiefs (2014); Baltimore Ravens (2014); Tennessee Titans (2015–2017)

Awards and highlights
- First-team All-Gulf South Conference (2009); 2× Second-team All-Gulf South Conference (2010, 2011)

Career NFL statistics
- Receptions: 14
- Receiving yards: 163
- Receiving touchdowns: 1
- Stats at Pro Football Reference

Phillip Steven Supernaw (born January 30, 1990) is an American former professional football player who was a tight end in the National Football League (NFL). He played college football for the Ouachita Baptist Tigers and signed with the Houston Texans as an undrafted free agent in 2012. Supernaw also played for the Baltimore Ravens, Kansas City Chiefs, and Tennessee Titans.

== Early life ==
Supernaw was born on January 30, 1990, at Vanderbilt Hospital in Nashville to country music singer Doug Supernaw and his wife Trudy. The family moved to the Houston area when Phillip was young because his father believed that he could find better success as a singer in Texas. Phillip played high school football at James E. Taylor High School in Katy, Texas.

== College career ==
Supernaw was a four-year starter for Ouachita Baptist University in southwestern Arkansas. He recorded 64 receptions for 710 yards and 10 touchdowns during his college career and earned first-team all-Gulf South Conference (2009), second-team all-Gulf South Conference (2010), and second-team All-Great American Conference (2011) honors.

== Professional career ==
=== Houston Texans ===
On April 29, 2012, Supernaw signed with the Houston Texans as an undrafted free agent after not being drafted in the 2012 NFL draft. He was released on August 31, but was re-signed to the practice squad the next day. Supernaw saw no playing time as a rookie.

Supernaw was released by the Texans on May 14, 2014.

=== Baltimore Ravens ===
Supernaw signed with the Baltimore Ravens on May 19, 2014. He was called up from the practice squad on September 23, to fill the roster spot opened up when tight end Dennis Pitta was placed on injured reserve for the season with a dislocated hip. On October 7, the Ravens cut Supernaw to make room for the signing of Ryan Taylor to their roster. The next day, Supernaw was re-signed to the practice squad. On October 25, the Ravens cut Taylor to make room for the re-signing of Supernaw from the practice squad to their 53-man roster. His first NFL reception for negative two yards took place on November 2, in a game against the Pittsburgh Steelers. Supernaw was released two days later.

=== Kansas City Chiefs ===
The Kansas City Chiefs signed Supernaw to their 53-man roster off the Ravens' practice squad on November 11, 2014. He was released on December 2.

=== Baltimore Ravens (second stint) ===
On December 3, 2014, Supernaw was re-signed to the Ravens' practice squad. Two days later, he was promoted to the active roster. Supernaw appeared in eight games and started one in the 2014 season.

Supernaw was released on May 12, 2015.

=== Tennessee Titans ===
The Tennessee Titans signed Supernaw on June 2, 2015. In 2015, he ranked second on the team with 14 special teams tackles. Supernaw appeared in 16 games and started one in the 2015 season.

In 2016, Supernaw collected career-highs with four receptions and 62 yards and tied for third on the Titans with eight special teams tackles.

On March 10, 2017, Supernaw signed a two-year deal with the Titans. On October 8, he caught his first NFL touchdown from Matt Cassel in the Titans' 16–10 road loss to the Miami Dolphins. In 2017, Supernaw tied a career-high with four receptions for 39 yards while also recording a fumble recovery in the regular-season finale against the Jacksonville Jaguars in 16 games and three starts. He also appeared in his first two career postseason contests.

On August 7, 2018, Supernaw was released.

=== Career statistics ===
==== Regular season ====
| | | | Receiving | | | |
| Year | Team | G | Rec | Yds | Y/R | TD |
|---|---|---|---|---|---|---|
| 2012 | HOU | 0 | DNP | | | |
| 2013 | HOU | 1 | 0 | 0 | 0.0 | 0 |
| 2014 | KC | 2 | 1 | 1 | 3.0 | 0 |
| 2014 | BAL | 6 | 2 | 27 | 13.5 | 0 |
| 2015 | TEN | 16 | 3 | 32 | 10.7 | 0 |
| 2016 | TEN | 15 | 4 | 62 | 15.5 | 0 |
| 2017 | TEN | 16 | 4 | 39 | 9.8 | 1 |
| Total | | 56 | 14 | 163 | 11.6 | 1 |

==== Postseason ====
| | | | Receiving | | | |
| Year | Team | G | Rec | Yds | Y/R | TD |
|---|---|---|---|---|---|---|
| 2017 | TEN | 2 | 0 | 0 | 0 | 0 |
| Total | | 2 | 0 | 0 | 0 | 0 |

== Personal life ==
Supernaw is a golf enthusiast and has a 2.0 handicap. On January 26, 2019, Supernaw married Abby Floyd, the former Miss Arkansas USA 2016. Supernaw's father, country music singer Doug Supernaw, died from lung and bladder cancer on November 13, 2020.

Supernaw was diagnosed with cancer on March 24, 2024.
