= Delanie Walker =

American football player (born 1984)

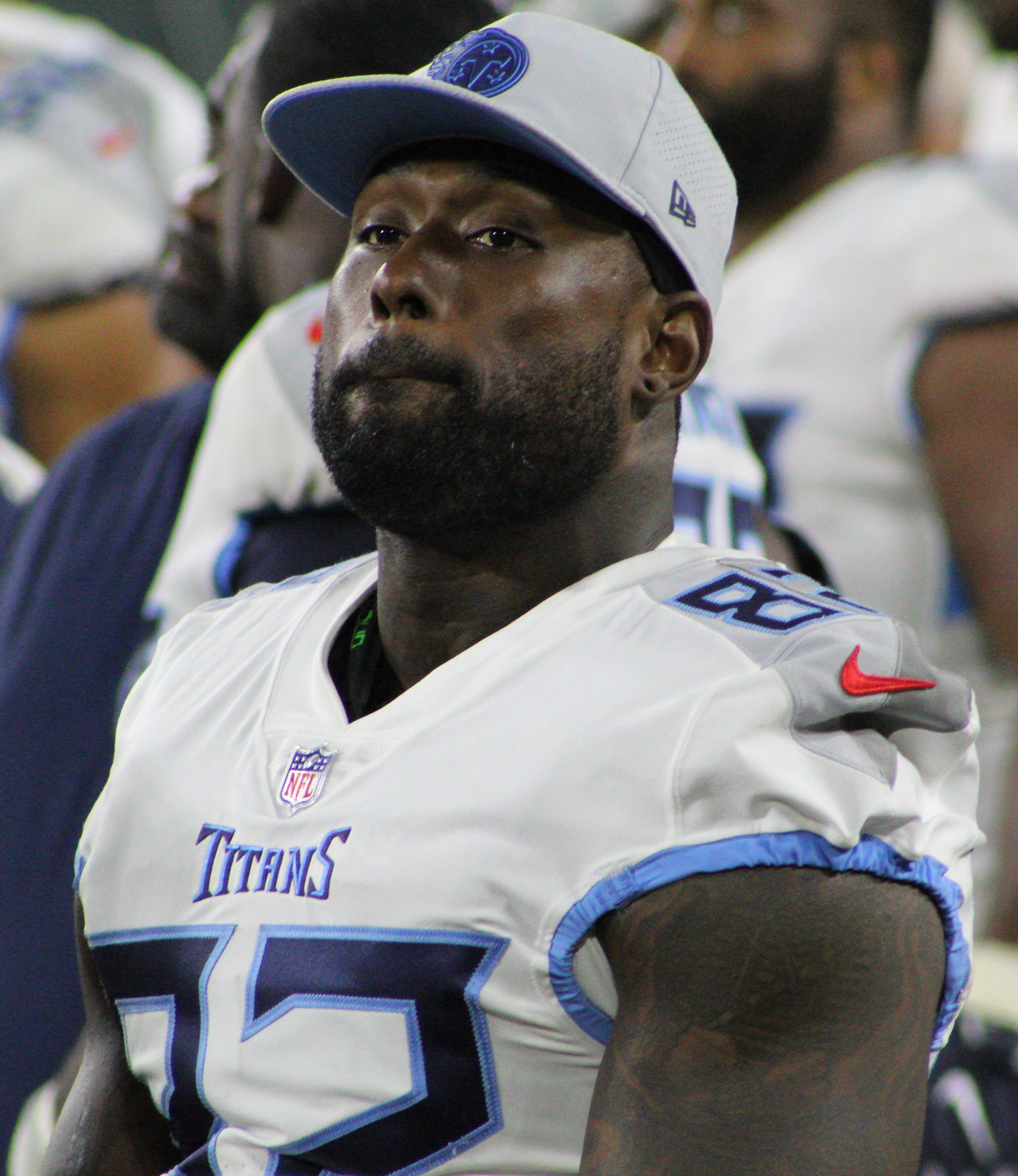
- Walker with the Tennessee Titans in 2018

No. 46, 82
- Position: Tight end

Personal information
- Born: August 12, 1984 (age 42); Pomona, California, U.S.
- Listed height: 6 ft 1 in (1.85 m)
- Listed weight: 248 lb (112 kg)

Career information
- High school: Pomona
- College: Mt. San Antonio (2002–2003); Central Missouri (2004–2005)
- NFL draft: 2006: 6th round, 175th overall pick

Career history
- San Francisco 49ers (2006–2012); Tennessee Titans (2013–2019)

Awards and highlights
- 3× Pro Bowl (2015–2017)

Career NFL statistics
- Receptions: 504
- Receiving yards: 5,888
- Return yards: 528
- Rushing yards: 89
- Total touchdowns: 37
- Stats at Pro Football Reference

Hubert Delanie Walker (born August 12, 1984) is an American former professional football player who was a tight end for 14 seasons in the National Football League (NFL). He played college football for the Central Missouri Mules and was selected by the San Francisco 49ers in the sixth round of the 2006 NFL draft.

After seven seasons with the 49ers, Walker played another seven seasons for the Tennessee Titans, with whom he was a three-time Pro Bowl selection. Walker was released from the Titans after the 2019 season after missing 25 regular-season games over the last two seasons due to an ankle injury.

== Early life ==
Walker attended and played high school football at Pomona High School. He was a first-team All-Region selection by The Times, adding All-Division and All-San Gabriel Valley honors as a senior under the direction of head coach John Capraro. Walker was twice chosen Miramonte League Offensive Player of the Year and was selected 2001 Pomona Red Devil of the Year. He played in the East/West All-Star game and also excelled in track & field, winning the Division III 100-meters title after also finishing first in the 2002 Miramonte League Meet.

After high school, Walker originally committed to UTEP, but decided to attend Mt. San Antonio College in Walnut, California to improve his academics.

== College career ==
Walker first enrolled at Mt. San Antonio College. In 2003, he was ranked seventh on JCFootball.com's "Top 101 Players" list. Walker finished his junior college career with 86 receptions for 1,312 yards and 13 touchdowns before transferring to the University of Central Missouri.

While at Central Missouri, Walker set or equaled several receiving records. In two seasons at Central Missouri, he recorded 113 receptions for 1,347 yards and 10 touchdowns to go along with 35 kickoff returns for 965 yards and three touchdowns. Walker's three kickoff returns for touchdowns are tied for the Central Missouri school record. He majored in video production, with a minor in criminal justice. On February 14, 2015, Walker was inducted into the Central Missouri Athletic Hall of Fame.

== Professional career ==
Pre-draft measurables
| Height | Weight | Arm length | Hand span | 40-yard dash | 10-yard split | 20-yard split | 20-yard shuttle | Three-cone drill | Vertical jump | Broad jump |
|---|---|---|---|---|---|---|---|---|---|---|
| 6 ft 1 1/4 in (1.86 m) | 240 lb (109 kg) | 32 in (0.81 m) | 9 3/4 in (0.25 m) | 4.49 s | 1.61 s | 2.67 s | 4.60 s | 7.23 s | 36.5 in (0.93 m) | 10 ft 7 in (3.23 m) |
All values from NFL Combine/Pro Day

=== San Francisco 49ers ===
==== 2006 season ====
Walker was selected by San Francisco 49ers in the sixth round (175th overall) of the 2006 NFL draft. He finished his rookie year with two receptions for 30 yards and had a 25-yard kickoff return in seven games and one start.

==== 2007 season ====
During a Week 13 31–14 road loss to the Carolina Panthers, Walker caught his first NFL touchdown on a 21-yard pass from Trent Dilfer. In the next game against the Minnesota Vikings, Walker had his best game of the season, catching six passes for 66 yards during the 27–7 loss.

Walker finished his second professional season with 21 receptions for 174 yards and a touchdown to go along with 63 return yards in 16 games and 10 starts.

==== 2008 season ====
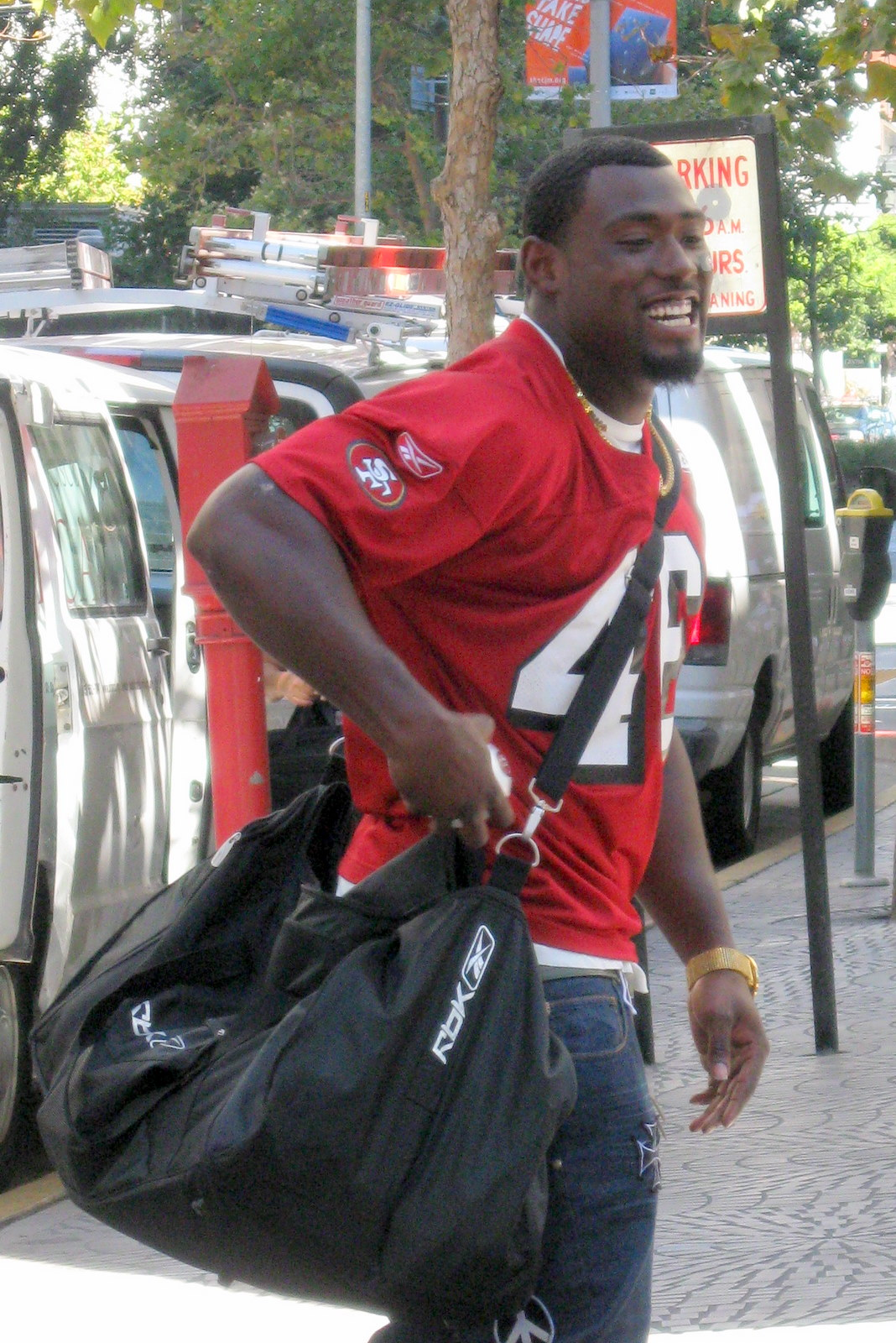
Walker in 2008

On June 21, 2008, the 49ers signed Walker to a three-year, $6 million extension with a $1.8 million signing bonus through 2012. During Week 4 of the preseason against the San Diego Chargers, Walker returned a kickoff for a 101-yard touchdown.

During a Week 3 31–13 victory over the Detroit Lions, Walker caught three passes for 44 yards and his first touchdown of the season.

Walker finished the 2008 season with 10 receptions for 155 yards and a touchdown to go along with 257 return yards in 15 games and two starts.

==== 2009 season ====
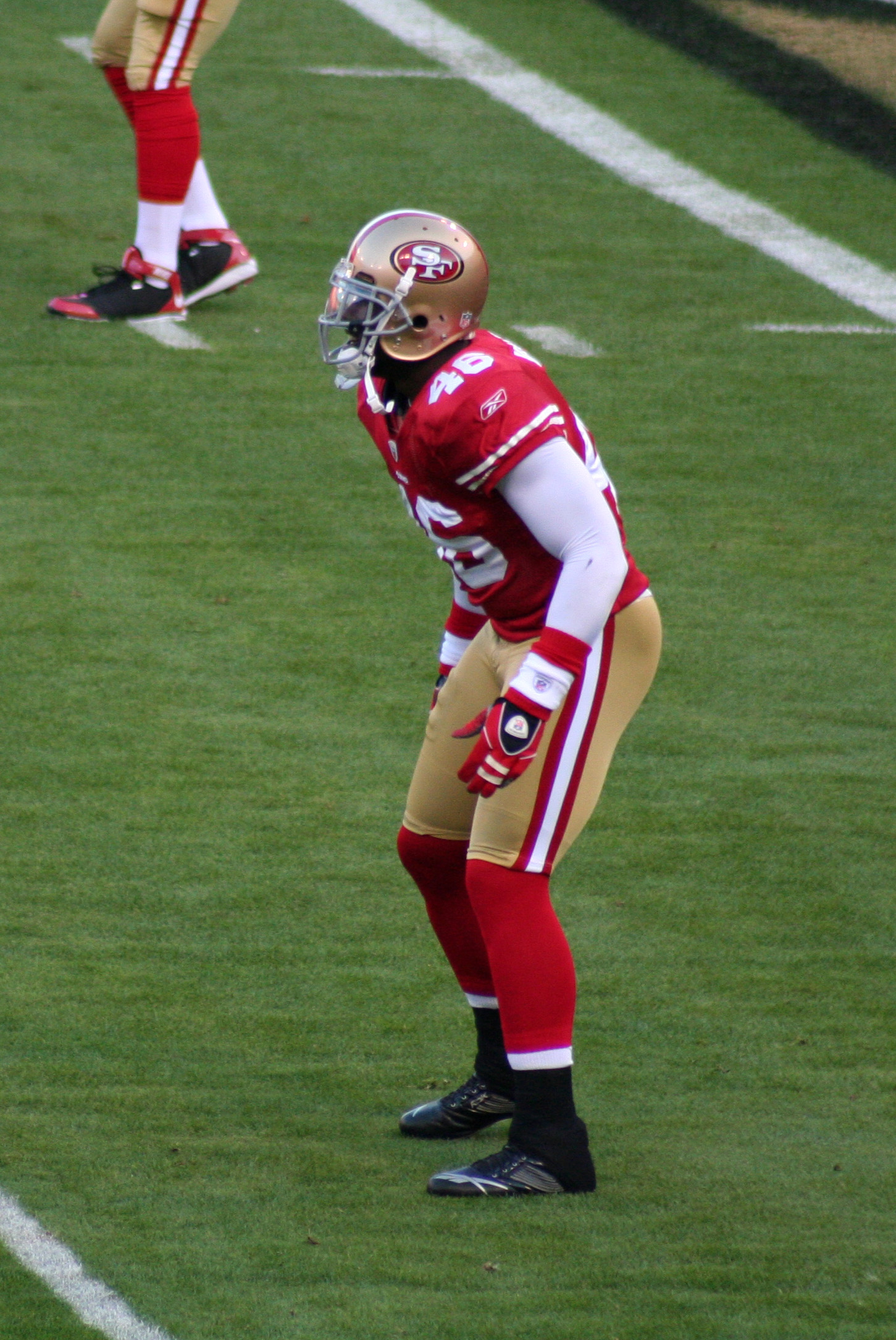
Walker in 2009

In 2009, Walker recorded 21 receptions for 233 yards to go along with 85 return yards and 34 rushing yards in 16 games and eight starts as the 49ers finished with an 8–8 record.

==== 2010 season ====
In 2010, Walker had 29 receptions for 331 yards to go along with 70 return yards and 18 rushing yards as the 49ers finished with a 6–10 record.

==== 2011 season ====
In 2011, Jim Harbaugh became head coach of the 49ers, and Greg Roman became the offensive coordinator for the team. They praised Walker's skill set and used him in a number of different ways in the West Coast offense, including different receiver spots, backup fullback, and even as an alternative kickoff returner and gunner on special teams, attributes that earned Walker the nickname of "The Swiss Army knife" within the team.

During a Week 2 27–24 overtime loss to the Dallas Cowboys, Walker caught two passes for 38 yards and his first touchdown of the season and his first since 2008. Three weeks later against the Tampa Bay Buccaneers, Walker had two receptions for 37 yards and a touchdown in the 48–3 victory. In the next game against the Lions, he recorded two receptions for 11 yards and a touchdown during the 25–19 road victory. During Week 10 against the New York Giants, Walker was the leading receiver with six receptions for 69 yards in the 27–20 victory.

Walker finished the 2011 season with 19 receptions for 198 yards and three touchdowns to go along with 28 return yards in 15 games and seven starts. The 49ers finished atop the NFC West with a 13–3 record and earned a first-round bye in the playoffs as the #2-seed. In the postseason, Walker caught two passes for 36 yards before the 49ers lost to the eventual Super Bowl champions, the Giants, in the NFC Championship Game.

==== 2012 season ====
During Week 7 against the Seattle Seahawks on Thursday Night Football, Walker caught his first touchdown of the season on a 12-yard pass from Alex Smith in the 13–6 victory. During a Week 12 31–21 road victory over the New Orleans Saints, Walker was the leading receiver with three receptions for 81 yards. Three weeks later against the New England Patriots on Sunday Night Football, he had two receptions for 34 yards and a touchdown in the 41–34 road victory. In the next game against the Seahawks, Walker recorded four receptions for 54 yards and a touchdown during the 42–13 road loss.

Walker finished the 2012 season with 21 receptions for 344 yards and three touchdowns to go along with 28 return yards in 16 games and four starts. The 49ers finished atop the NFC West with an 11–4–1 record and earned a first-round bye in the playoffs as the #2-seed. At the end of the season, Walker and 49ers reached Super Bowl XLVII, where he caught three passes for 48 yards, but the 49ers fell behind early and could not come back, losing to the Baltimore Ravens by a score of 34–31.

=== Tennessee Titans ===
==== 2013 season ====
On March 12, 2013, Walker signed a four-year, $17.5 million contract with $8.6 million guaranteed with the Tennessee Titans.

Walker made his Titans debut during the season-opener against the Pittsburgh Steelers and finished the 16–9 road victory with three receptions for 40 yards. In the next game against the Houston Texans, he caught his first touchdown of the season on a 10-yard pass from Jake Locker during the 30–24 overtime road loss. Two weeks later against the New York Jets, Walker recorded three receptions for 14 yards and a touchdown in the 38–13 victory.

During a Week 7 31–17 loss to his former team, the San Francisco 49ers, Walker caught three passes for 52 yards and a touchdown. Three weeks later against the Jacksonville Jaguars, he had four receptions for 62 yards and a touchdown in the narrow 29–27 loss. In the next game against the Indianapolis Colts, Walker recorded 10 receptions for 91 yards and a touchdown during the 30–27 loss. During Week 15 against the Arizona Cardinals, he caught eight passes for 53 yards and a touchdown in the 37–34 overtime loss.

Walker finished the 2013 season with 60 receptions for 571 yards and six touchdowns in 15 games and 11 starts.

==== 2014 season ====
Walker began the season with three receptions for 37 yards and a touchdown during the season-opening 26–10 road victory over the Kansas City Chiefs. In the next game against the Cowboys, he had a career day with 10 receptions for 142 yards and a touchdown during the 26–10 loss. Two weeks later against the Colts, Walker caught five passes for 84 yards and a touchdown in the 41–17 road loss.

During a Week 8 30–16 loss to the Texans, Walker recorded four receptions for 37 yards and a touchdown. During Week 12 against the Philadelphia Eagles, he had five receptions for a career-high 155 yards in the 43–24 road loss.

Walker finished the 2014 season with 63 receptions for 890 yards and four touchdowns in 15 games and 14 starts.

==== 2015 season ====
Walker had a career year in 2015, shattering all Titans records for a tight end, including 1,088 yards receiving. He had previously broken the Titans' tight end receiving yards record in the 2014 season with 890 yards. Walker led all NFL tight ends with 94 receptions and became only the ninth tight end to ever record more than 90 catches in a single season. He was later named to his first career Pro Bowl.

Walker began the season with three receptions for 43 yards and a touchdown in the season-opening 42–14 road victory over the Buccaneers. During a Week 9 34–28 overtime road victory over the Saints, he recorded his first career multi-touchdown game with seven receptions for 95 yards and two touchdowns. Two weeks later against the Jaguars on Thursday Night Football, Walker caught eight passes for 109 yards for his third career game with at least 100 yards in the 19–13 road loss.

During a Week 13 42–39 victory over the Jaguars, Walker recorded eight receptions for 92 yards and a touchdown. Two weeks later against the Patriots, he had a touchdown that would come off of a highlight-reel play in the fourth quarter. Walker caught a pass from quarterback Zach Mettenberger, broke two tackles, hurdled a man, and stiff-armed another, all while racing down the sideline to the end zone to complete a 57-yard score. Walker finished the 33–16 road loss with two receptions for 64 yards, both for touchdowns. In the regular-season finale against the Colts, he had nine receptions for 94 yards and a 36-yard rush during the 30–24 road loss. Walker was ranked 82nd by his fellow players on the NFL Top 100 Players of 2016.

==== 2016 season ====
On May 6, 2016, Walker signed a two-year, $14.7 million extension with $8.2 million guaranteed.

Walker began the season with five receptions for 42 yards in the season-opening 25–16 loss to the Vikings. In the next game against the Lions, he caught six passes for 83 yards and his first touchdown of the season during the narrow 16–15 victory. Three weeks later against the Miami Dolphins, Walker recorded five receptions for 66 yards and a touchdown in the 30–17 road victory.

Walker began to hit his stride in the middle of the season. During a Week 7 34–26 loss to the Colts, he had seven receptions for 84 yards and a touchdown. In the next game against the Jaguars on Thursday Night Football, Walker recorded four receptions for 75 yards, including a season-long 47-yard reception during the third quarter of the 36–22 victory. The following week against the Chargers, he caught five passes for 42 yards and a touchdown in the 43–35 road loss.

During Week 10 against the Green Bay Packers, Walker had nine receptions for 124 yards and a touchdown in the 47–25 victory. Two weeks later against the Chicago Bears, he recorded three receptions for 50 yards and a touchdown in the 27–21 road victory. During a Week 16 38–17 road loss to the Jaguars, Walker caught three passes for 23 yards and his seventh touchdown of the season.

Walker finished the 2016 season with 65 receptions for 800 yards and a career-high seven touchdowns in 15 games and 10 starts. He was named to his second consecutive Pro Bowl. Walker was ranked 75th by his fellow players on the NFL Top 100 Players of 2017.

==== 2017 season ====
During Week 2 against the Jaguars, Walker recorded four receptions for 61 yards and his first rushing touchdown on a one-yard rush in the third quarter of the 37–16 road victory. During a Week 12 20–16 road victory over the Colts, Walker had four receptions for 63 yards and a touchdown. In the next game against the Texans, he put up similar numbers, catching five passes for 63 yards and a touchdown during the 24–13 victory. Two weeks later against his former team, the 49ers, Walker recorded five receptions for 39 yards and a touchdown in the narrow 25–23 road loss.

Walker finished the 2017 season with 74 receptions for 807 yards and three touchdowns to go along with a rushing touchdown in 16 games and 11 starts. The Titans finished the season with a 9–7 record for the second straight year and made the playoffs as a Wild Card team. During the Wild Card Round against the Chiefs, Walker was the leading receiver with six receptions for 74 yards in the narrow 22–21 comeback road victory. In the Divisional Round against the Patriots, he had three receptions for 49 yards, including a 36-yard catch and run during the first quarter of the 35–14 road loss. On January 16, 2018, Walker was named to his third consecutive Pro Bowl to replace an injured Travis Kelce. Walker was named the 2018 Pro Bowl offensive MVP after catching the game-winning touchdown, in addition to another touchdown he caught earlier in the game. Walker was ranked 72nd by his fellow players on the NFL Top 100 Players of 2018.

==== 2018 season ====
On July 27, 2018, Walker signed a two-year, $17 million extension with $12.6 million guaranteed.

During the season-opener against the Dolphins, Walker had four receptions for 52 yards before leaving the eventual 27–20 road loss in the fourth quarter with an ankle injury. It was later revealed that he suffered a dislocated ankle and an associated fracture and would miss the rest of the season. Walker was placed on injured reserve on September 10, 2018. Without Walker, the Titans finished 9–7 for the third consecutive year and missed out on the playoffs.

==== 2019 season ====
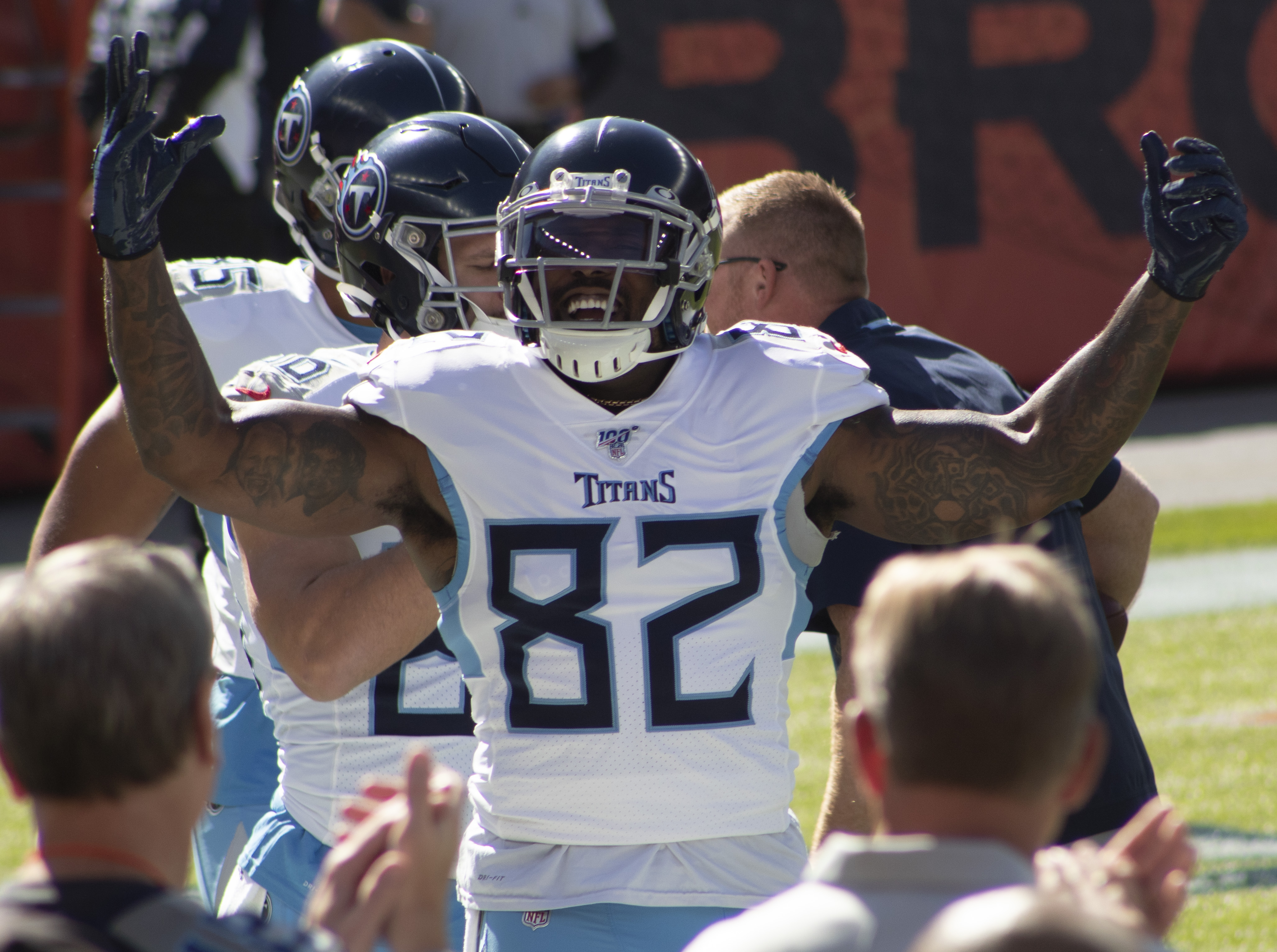
Walker in 2019

Walker returned from his injury in time for the season-opener against the Cleveland Browns and finished the 43–13 road victory with five receptions for 55 yards and two touchdowns. During a Week 4 24–10 road victory over the Atlanta Falcons, he reached 500 career receptions.

On November 27, 2019, Walker was placed on injured reserve after dealing with an ankle injury for most of the season. Prior to his injury, Walker had 21 receptions for 215 yards and two touchdowns in seven games and four starts. Without him, the Titans finished 9–7 for the fourth consecutive year and lost to the Chiefs in the AFC Championship Game.

On March 13, 2020, Walker was released by the Titans after seven seasons.

=== Free agency ===
On the December 9, 2020, episode of The Pat McAfee Show, Walker stated that he was staying in shape and could probably play that year. However, Walker did not want to play in 2020 due to issues surrounding COVID-19, among them Dez Bryant being removed from warm-ups after testing positive.

On June 1, 2021, the San Francisco 49ers hosted Walker for a workout.

=== Retirement ===
On October 18, 2022, Walker announced his retirement from the NFL, signing a one-day deal with the Titans to retire as a member of the franchise.

== NFL career statistics ==
Legend
| **Bold** | Career high |

=== Regular season ===
| Year | Team | Games | | Receiving | | | | | Rushing | | | | | Returning | | | | | Fumbles | |
| Year | Team | GP | GS | Rec | Yds | Avg | Lng | TD | Att | Yds | Avg | Lng | TD | Ret | Yds | Avg | Lng | TD | Fum | Lost |
|---|---|---|---|---|---|---|---|---|---|---|---|---|---|---|---|---|---|---|---|---|
| 2006 | SF | 7 | 1 | 2 | 30 | 15.0 | 29 | 0 | — | — | — | — | — | 1 | 25 | **25.0** | 25 | 0 | 0 | 0 |
| 2007 | SF | 16 | 10 | 21 | 174 | 8.3 | 26 | 1 | — | — | — | — | — | 3 | 63 | 21.0 | 30 | 0 | 0 | 0 |
| 2008 | SF | 15 | 2 | 10 | 155 | 15.5 | 53 | 1 | 2 | −13 | −6.5 | −3 | 0 | **13** | **257** | 19.8 | **35** | 0 | **2** | 0 |
| 2009 | SF | 16 | 8 | 21 | 233 | 11.1 | 39 | 0 | **3** | 34 | 11.3 | 16 | 0 | 5 | 85 | 17.0 | 25 | 0 | **2** | **2** |
| 2010 | SF | 14 | 8 | 29 | 331 | 11.4 | 38 | 0 | **3** | 18 | 6.0 | 10 | 0 | 5 | 70 | 14.0 | 20 | 0 | 1 | 1 |
| 2011 | SF | 15 | 7 | 19 | 198 | 10.4 | 29T | 3 | **3** | 5 | 1.7 | 14 | 0 | — | — | — | — | — | 0 | 0 |
| 2012 | SF | 16 | 4 | 21 | 344 | **16.4** | 45 | 3 | — | — | — | — | — | 4 | 28 | 7.0 | 18 | 0 | 1 | 1 |
| 2013 | TEN | 15 | 11 | 60 | 571 | 9.5 | 33 | 6 | — | — | — | — | — | — | — | — | — | — | 1 | 0 |
| 2014 | TEN | 15 | 14 | 63 | 890 | 14.1 | **68** | 4 | — | — | — | — | — | — | — | — | — | — | **2** | 0 |
| 2015 | TEN | 15 | 10 | **94** | **1,088** | 11.6 | 61T | 6 | 1 | **36** | **36.0** | **36** | 0 | — | — | — | — | — | 0 | 0 |
| 2016 | TEN | 15 | 10 | 65 | 800 | 12.3 | 47 | **7** | 2 | 11 | 5.5 | 8 | 0 | — | — | — | — | — | 1 | 0 |
| 2017 | TEN | 16 | 11 | 74 | 807 | 10.9 | 42 | 3 | 2 | −2 | −1.0 | 1T | **1** | — | — | — | — | — | **2** | **2** |
| 2018 | TEN | 1 | 1 | 4 | 52 | 13.0 | 16 | 0 | — | — | — | — | — | — | — | — | — | — | 0 | 0 |
| 2019 | TEN | 7 | 4 | 21 | 215 | 10.2 | 29 | 2 | — | — | — | — | — | — | — | — | — | — | 1 | 0 |
| Career | | 183 | 101 | 504 | 5,888 | 11.7 | 68 | 36 | 16 | 89 | 5.6 | 36 | 1 | 31 | 528 | 17.0 | 35 | 0 | 13 | 6 |

=== Postseason ===
| Year | Team | Games | | Receiving | | | | | Rushing | | | | | Returning | | | | | Fumbles | |
| Year | Team | GP | GS | Rec | Yds | Avg | Lng | TD | Att | Yds | Avg | Lng | TD | Ret | Yds | Avg | Lng | TD | Fum | Lost |
|---|---|---|---|---|---|---|---|---|---|---|---|---|---|---|---|---|---|---|---|---|
| 2011 | SF | 1 | 1 | 2 | 36 | **18.0** | 29 | 0 | — | — | — | — | — | — | — | — | — | — | **1** | 0 |
| 2012 | SF | 3 | 1 | 5 | 85 | 17.0 | 28 | 0 | — | — | — | — | — | — | — | — | — | — | 0 | 0 |
| 2017 | TEN | 2 | 2 | **9** | **123** | 13.7 | **36** | 0 | — | — | — | — | — | — | — | — | — | — | 0 | 0 |
| 2019 | TEN | 0 | 0 | Did not play due to injury | | | | | | | | | | | | | | | | |
| Career | | 6 | 4 | 16 | 244 | 15.3 | 36 | 0 | 0 | 0 | 0.0 | 0 | 0 | 0 | 0 | 0.0 | 0 | 0 | 1 | 0 |

== Career highlights ==
- 3× Pro Bowl (2015–2017)
- Pro Bowl Offensive MVP (2017)
- 3× NFL Top 100 — 82nd (2016), 75th (2017), 72nd (2018)

Titans franchise records

- Most receiving touchdowns by a tight end: 28
- Most receptions in a season by a tight end: 94
- Most receiving yards in a season by a tight end: 1,088

== Personal life ==
In 2013, Walker's aunt and uncle were killed by a drunk driver five hours after Walker played in Super Bowl XLVII. The tragedy motivated him to speak out against drunk driving, and support laws requiring the installation of an ignition interlock device for first-time DUI offenders. Walker has three children and is a car and powerboat enthusiast.

Walker co-hosts the weekly NFL and college football gambling show The Locker Room, presented by the Bussin With The Boys podcast, alongside former Titans teammates Will Compton and Taylor Lewan.
