= Jeffery Simmons =

American football player (born 1997)

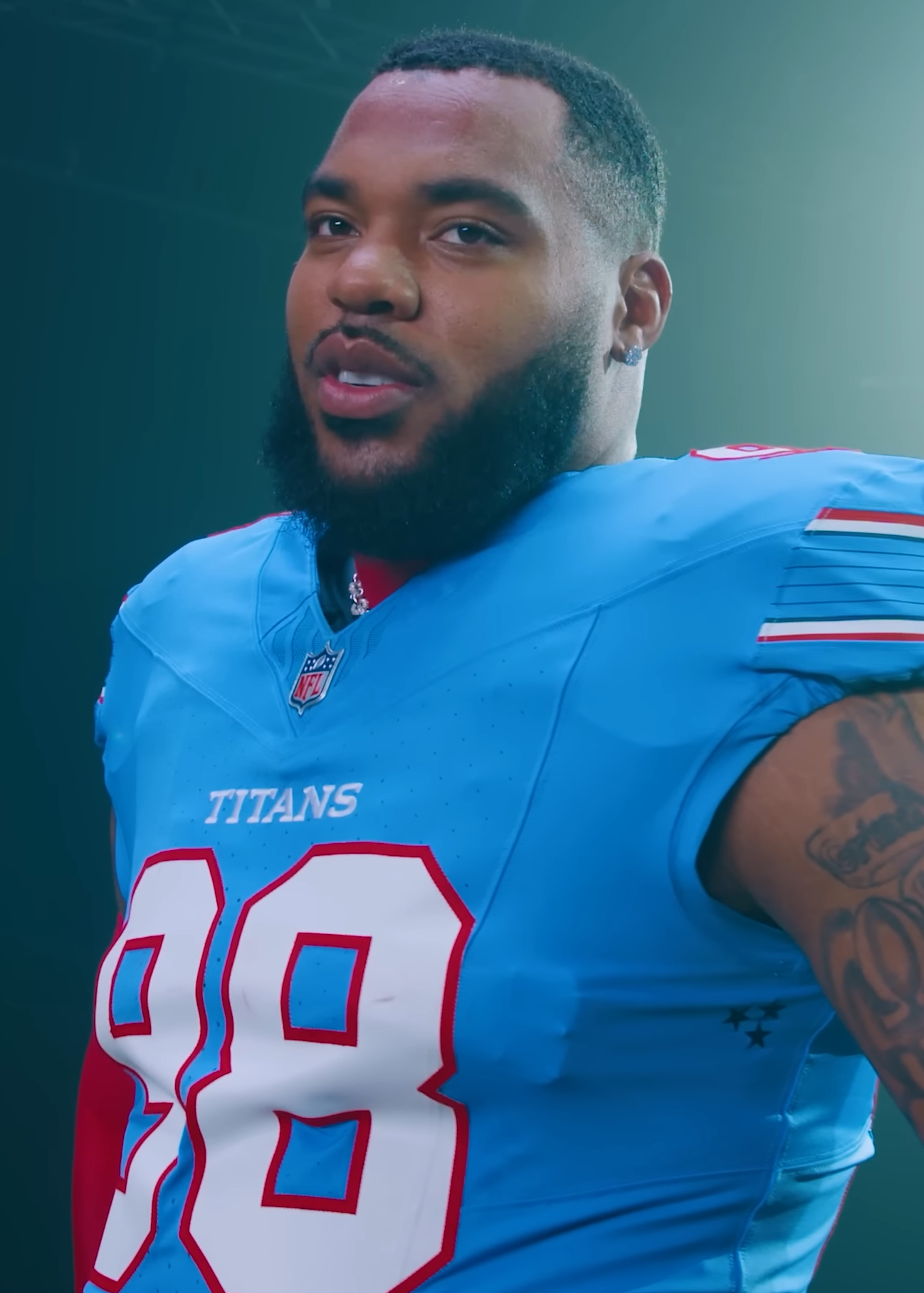
- Simmons with the Tennessee Titans in 2026

No. 99 – Chicago Bears
- Position: Defensive tackle
- Roster status: Active

Personal information
- Born: July 28, 1997 (age 29); Jena, Louisiana, U.S.
- Listed height: 6 ft 4 in (1.93 m)
- Listed weight: 305 lb (138 kg)

Career information
- High school: Noxubee County (Macon, Mississippi)
- College: Mississippi State (2016–2018)
- NFL draft: 2019: 1st round, 19th overall pick

Career history
- Tennessee Titans (2019–2026); Chicago Bears (2026–present)

Awards and highlights
- First-team All-Pro (2025); 2× Second-team All-Pro (2021, 2022); 4× Pro Bowl (2021, 2022, 2024, 2025); Conerly Trophy (2018); 2× First-team All-SEC (2017, 2018)

Career NFL statistics as of Week 9, 2026
- Total tackles: 424
- Sacks: 48.5
- Forced fumbles: 9
- Fumble recoveries: 7
- Pass deflections: 33
- Receiving touchdowns: 2
- Stats at Pro Football Reference

Jeffery Bernard Simmons Jr. (born July 28, 1997) is an American professional football defensive tackle for the Chicago Bears of the National Football League (NFL). He played college football for the Mississippi State Bulldogs and was selected by the Tennessee Titans in the first round of the 2019 NFL draft.

== College career ==
After a standout career playing at Noxubee County High School in Mississippi, Simmons was considered a five-star prospect and committed to Mississippi State over Alabama and Ole Miss.

As a true freshman in 2016, Simmons had 40 tackles, two forced fumbles, and two pass deflections.

Simmons had a breakout sophomore season in 2017 and was a consensus selection to the 2017 All-SEC football team after recording 60 tackles, five sacks, a pass deflection, two forced fumbles, two fumble recoveries, and a touchdown on a fumble recovery.

As a junior in 2018, Simmons had 63 tackles, two sacks, a forced fumble, and four pass deflections. On December 20, 2018, he declared for the 2019 NFL draft. Two months later, on February 12, 2019, Simmons tore his ACL while training for the draft.

== Professional career ==
Pre-draft measurables
Height	Weight	Arm length	Hand span	Wingspan	Bench press	Wonderlic
6 ft 3 3/4 in (1.92 m)	305 lb (138 kg)	34 1/2 in (0.88 m)	10 1/4 in (0.26 m)	6 ft 10 7/8 in (2.11 m)	28 reps	14
All values from Pro Day

=== Tennessee Titans ===
==== 2019 season ====
Simmons was selected by the Tennessee Titans in the first round (19th overall) of the 2019 NFL draft. On May 22, 2019, he signed a four-year, $12.66 million rookie contract with a team option for a fifth year with a $7.23 million signing bonus. Simmons was placed on the reserve/non-football injury list to start the 2019 season while recovering from his torn ACL.

On October 19, 2019, the Titans activated Simmons from the non-football injury list. He made his NFL debut the next day against the Los Angeles Chargers and finished the 23–20 victory with four tackles and his first NFL sack on Philip Rivers. During Week 14 against the Oakland Raiders, Simmons had five tackles and a sack in the 42–21 road victory. In the next game against the Houston Texans, he recorded three tackles and a pass deflection during the 24–21 loss.

Simmons finished his rookie year with 32 tackles, two sacks, and a pass deflection in nine games and seven starts. The Titans finished second in the AFC South with a 9–7 record and qualified for the playoffs as the #6-seed. In the Wild Card Round against the New England Patriots, Simmons made his postseason debut and finished the 20–13 road victory with a solo tackle. During the Divisional Round against the Ravens, Simmons had two tackles and recovered a fumble forced by teammate Jurrell Casey on Lamar Jackson in the 28–12 road victory. However, the Titans lost to the eventual Super Bowl champions, the Kansas City Chiefs, in the AFC Championship Game, with Simmons recording no statistics during the 35–24 road loss.

==== 2020 season ====
During the season-opener against the Denver Broncos on Monday Night Football, Simmons recorded four tackles and a fumble recovery in the narrow 16–14 road victory. In the next game against the Jacksonville Jaguars, he had three tackles and a pass deflection during the 33–30 victory. The following week against the Minnesota Vikings, Simmons recorded five tackles and his first sack of the season on Kirk Cousins in the narrow 31–30 road victory.

Simmons was placed on the reserve/COVID-19 list by the team on October 3. He was activated on October 15. Simmons returned in time for the Week 6 matchup against the Texans and finished the 42–36 overtime victory with six tackles and a sack. In the next game against the Pittsburgh Steelers, Simmons recorded three tackles and a pass deflection during the 27–24 loss. Two weeks later against the Chicago Bears, he had three tackles, a pass deflection, a fumble recovery, and forced a fumble on running back David Montgomery that was recovered and returned by teammate Desmond King for a 63-yard touchdown in the 24–17 victory. Simmons was named AFC Defensive Player of the Week for his performance in Week 9.

During a Week 10 34–17 loss to the Indianapolis Colts on Thursday Night Football, Simmons recorded two tackles and a pass deflection. Two weeks later against the Colts, he had four tackles, a sack, and a pass deflection in the 45–26 road victory. During Week 15 against the Detroit Lions, Simmons recorded two tackles and a fumble recovery in the 46–25 victory.

Simmons finished his second professional season with 49 tackles, three sacks, five pass deflections, a forced fumble, and three fumble recoveries in 15 games and starts. The Titans finished atop the AFC South with an 11–5 record and qualified for the playoffs. During the Wild Card Round against the Ravens, Simmons had three tackles in the 20–13 loss. He was ranked 78th by his fellow players on the NFL Top 100 Players of 2021.

==== 2021 season ====
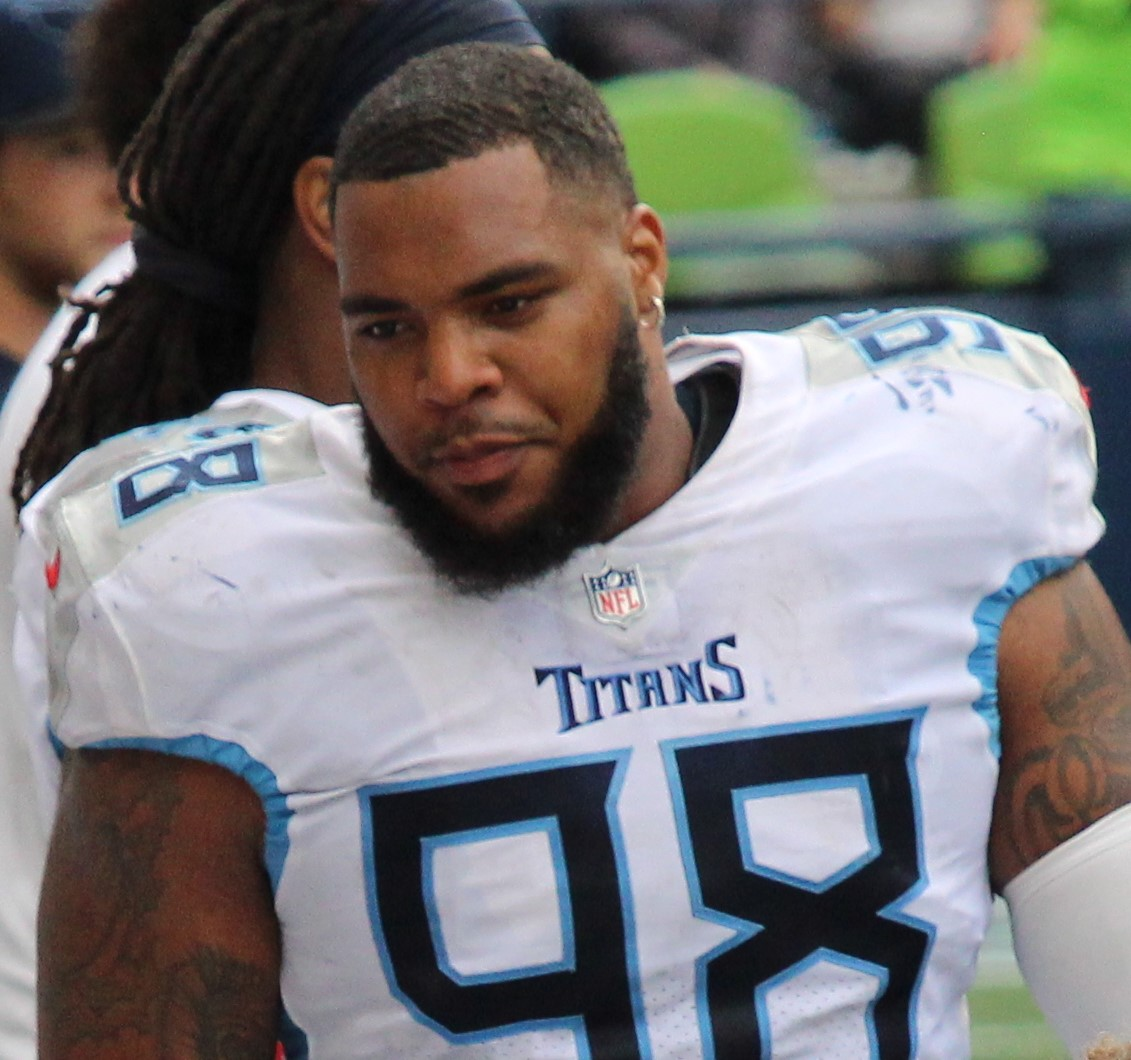
Simmons with the Titans in 2021

During the season-opening 38–13 loss to the Arizona Cardinals, Simmons had five tackles and his first sack of the season on Kyler Murray. In the next game against the Seattle Seahawks, Simmons recorded a tackle and 0.5 sacks during the 33–30 overtime road victory. The following week against the Colts, he had three tackles and a pass deflection in the 25–16 victory.

During Week 5 against the Jaguars, Simmons recorded three tackles and a pass deflection in the 37–19 road victory. In the next game against the Buffalo Bills on Monday Night Football, he had five tackles and a sack during the 34–31 victory. Three weeks later against the Los Angeles Rams on Sunday Night Football, Simmons recorded a season-high six tackles and sacked Matthew Stafford thrice in the 28–16 road victory.

During a narrow Week 10 23–21 victory over the New Orleans Saints, Simmons had four tackles, a pass deflection, and sacked Trevor Siemian twice. In the next game against the Texans, Simmons recorded five tackles and a pass deflection during the 22–13 loss. The following week against the Patriots, he tied his season-high of six tackles in the 36–13 road loss.

Following a Week 13 bye, the Titans returned home to face the Jaguars. Simmons finished the 20–0 shutout victory with three tackles and a pass deflection. In the next game against the Steelers, he had a tackle and a pass deflection during the 19–13 road loss. During the regular season finale against the Texans, Simmons recorded two tackles and a sack in the 28–25 road victory.

Simmons finished the 2021 season with 54 tackles, 8.5 sacks, and six pass deflections in 17 games and starts. The Titans finished atop the AFC South with a 12–5 record and qualified for the playoffs as the #1-seed. In the Divisional Round against the Cincinnati Bengals, Simmons had eight tackles and sacked Joe Burrow thrice during the 19–16 loss. On January 31, 2022, Simmons was named to his first Pro Bowl as an injury replacement to Chris Jones. Simmons was ranked 54th by his fellow players on the NFL Top 100 Players of 2022.

==== 2022 season ====
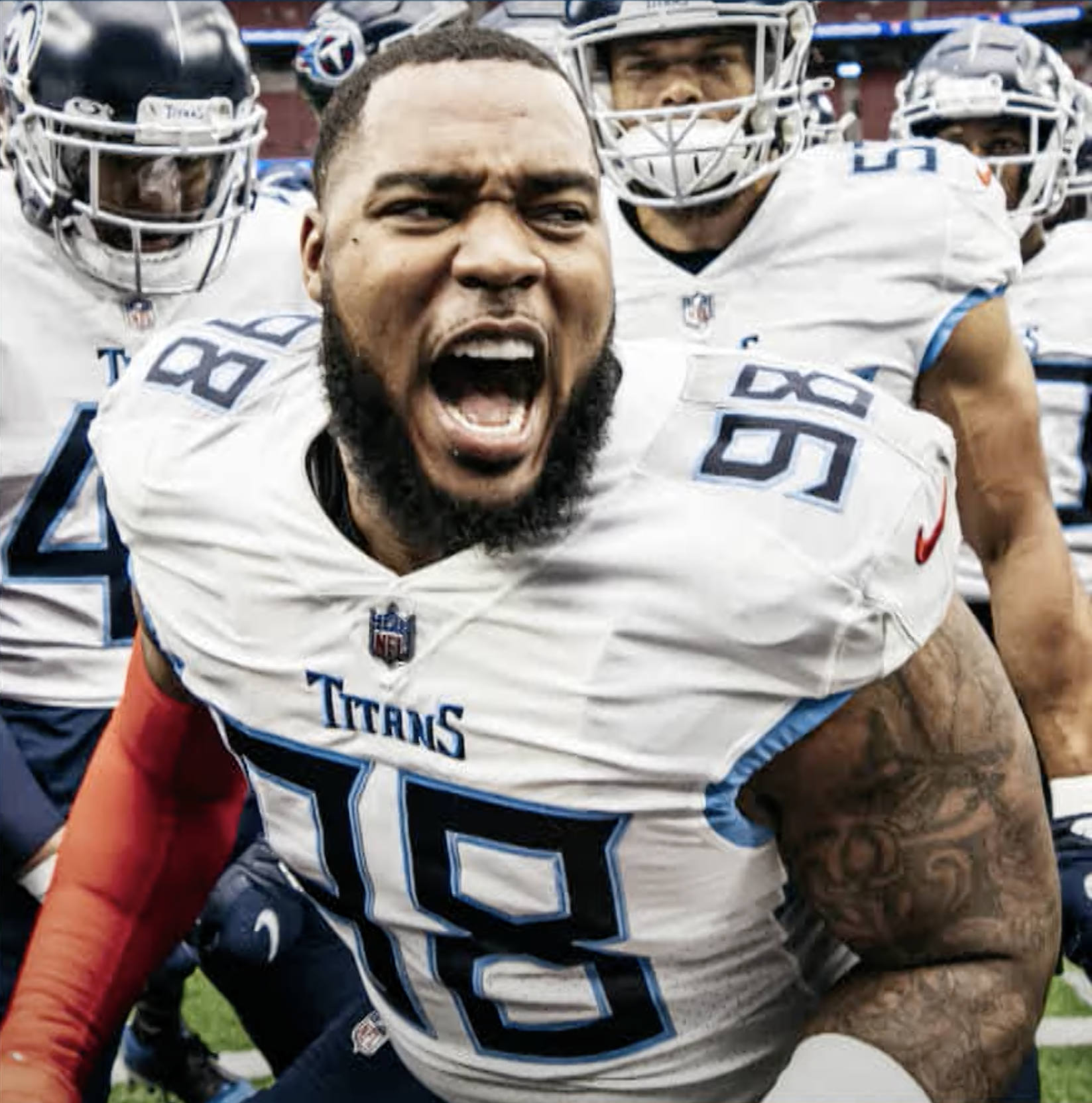
Simmons in 2022

On April 27, 2022, the Titans picked up the fifth-year option on Simmons' contract.

During the season-opener against the New York Giants, Simmons had six tackles and sacked Daniel Jones twice (one was a strip-sack) in the narrow 21–20 loss. In the next game against the Bills on Monday Night Football, Simmons recorded a pass deflection during the 41–7 road loss. The following week against the Las Vegas Raiders, he had two tackles and a pass deflection in the narrow 24–22 victory.

During a Week 5 21–17 road victory over the Washington Commanders, Simmons recorded five tackles and 1.5 sacks. Following a Week 6 bye, the Titans returned home to face the Colts. Simmons finished the 19–10 victory with six tackles and sacked Matt Ryan once. In the next game against the Texans, Simmons had two tackles and a sack during the 17–10 road victory.

During Week 10 against the Chiefs on Sunday Night Football, Simmons had four tackles and a pass deflection in the 20–17 overtime road loss. However, he missed the next game against the Broncos with an ankle injury. Simmons returned the following week against the Green Bay Packers on Thursday Night Football and recorded five tackles and sacked Aaron Rodgers once in the 27–17 victory.

During a Week 13 35–10 road loss to the Philadelphia Eagles, Simmons recorded a tackle and a pass deflection. In the next game against the Jaguars, he had two pass deflections during the 36–22 loss. The following week against the Chargers, Simmons recorded a season-high seven tackles and sacked Justin Herbert once in the 17–14 road loss.

Simmons finished the 2022 season with 54 tackles, 7.5 sacks, seven pass deflections, and a forced fumble in 15 games and starts. He was named to his second Pro Bowl. Simmons was ranked 58th by his fellow players on the NFL Top 100 Players of 2023.

==== 2023 season ====
On April 7, 2023, Simmons signed a four-year, $94 million contract extension with the Titans.

During the narrow season-opening 16–15 road loss to the Saints, Simmons recorded five tackles and his first sack of the season on Derek Carr. In the next game against the Chargers, Simmons once again had five tackles and a sack during the 27–24 overtime victory. Two weeks later against the Bengals, he recorded two tackles and 0.5 sacks in the 27–3 blowout victory.

During Week 8 against the Atlanta Falcons, Simmons had five tackles and sacked Desmond Ridder twice (one was a strip sack) in the 28–23 victory. In the next game against the Steelers on Thursday Night Football, Simmons recorded a season-high seven tackles during the 20–16 road loss. The following week against the Tampa Bay Buccaneers, he had four tackles and a pass deflection in the 20–6 road loss.

During a Week 11 34–14 road loss to the Jaguars, Simmons recorded two tackles and scored his first NFL career touchdown on a two-yard reception from quarterback Will Levis after being declared an eligible receiver. In the next game against the Carolina Panthers, Simmons had five tackles, a sack, and a fumble recovery during the 17–10 victory.

On December 23, Simmons was placed on season-ending injured reserve. He finished the 2023 season with 44 tackles, 5.5 sacks, a pass deflection, a forced fumble, and a fumble recovery to go along with a receiving touchdown in 12 games and starts. Simmons was ranked 73rd by his fellow players on the NFL Top 100 Players of 2024.

==== 2024 season ====
During Week 3 against the Green Bay Packers, Simmons had five tackles and his first sack of the season on Malik Willis in the 30–14 loss. However, Simmons missed the next game due to an elbow injury.

During a Week 7 34–10 road loss to the Buffalo Bills, Simmons recorded two tackles and a pass deflection. In the next game against the Detroit Lions, he had four tackles, a sack, and a forced fumble during the 52–14 road loss. The following week against the New England Patriots, Simmons recorded five tackles and a fumble recovery in the 20–17 overtime victory.

During Week 10 against the Los Angeles Chargers, Simmons had five tackles and a pass deflection in the 27–17 road loss. In the next game against the Minnesota Vikings, he recorded four tackles, a forced fumble, and a fumble recovery during the 23–13 loss. The following week against the Houston Texans, Simmons had two tackles, a sack, and a pass deflection in the 32–27 road victory.

During a Week 13 42–19 road loss to the Washington Commanders, Simmons recorded a season-high nine tackles. In the next game against the Jacksonville Jaguars, he had five tackles and a pass deflection during the 10–6 loss. Two weeks later against the Indianapolis Colts, Simmons tied his season-high of nine tackles and sacked Anthony Richardson once in the 38–30 road loss.

Simmons finished the 2024 season with a career-high 76 tackles, five sacks, two forced fumbles, and four pass deflections in 16 games and starts. He earned his third Pro Bowl nomination as a replacement for injured defensive tackle Nnamdi Madubuike.

==== 2025 season ====
During the season-opening 20–12 road loss to the Denver Broncos, Simmons recorded four tackles and strip-sacked Bo Nix once. Three weeks later against the Houston Texans, Simmons had five tackles and a sack in the 26–0 shutout road loss. In the next game against the Arizona Cardinals, he recorded a season-high eight tackles and 1.5 sacks during the narrow 22–21 road victory.

During Week 6 against the Las Vegas Raiders, Simmons had six tackles and a sack in the 20–10 road loss. He did not play in Weeks 8 and 9 due to a hamstring injury. Simmons returned in time for the team's Week 11 matchup against the Houston Texans and finished the 16–13 loss with three tackles and a sack.

During a Week 13 25–3 loss to the Jacksonville Jaguars, Simmons recorded six tackles and a sack. In the next game against the Cleveland Browns, he had seven tackles, 1.5 sacks, and a pass deflection during the narrow 31–29 road victory. The following week against the San Francisco 49ers, Simmons recorded seven tackles and strip-sacked Brock Purdy once while also scoring his second career touchdown on a one-yard reception from quarterback Cam Ward in the 37–24 road loss.

During Week 16 against the Kansas City Chiefs, Simmons had three tackles, a pass deflection, and his first career safety in the 26–9 victory. In the next game against the New Orleans Saints, he recorded seven tackles and strip-sacked Tyler Shough during the 34–26 loss. During the regular season finale against the Jaguars, Simmons had two tackles and a sack in the 41–7 road loss. He was named AFC Defensive Player of the Month for December.

Simmons finished the 2025 season with 67 tackles, 11 sacks, three forced fumbles, and three pass deflections to go along with a touchdown reception in 15 games and starts. He was named to his fourth Pro Bowl and was also named first-team All-Pro. He was ranked 83rd by his fellow players on the NFL Top 100 Players of 2026.

==== 2026 season ====
On June 19, 2026, Simmons signed a three-year, $105.8 million contract extension with the Titans.

After an 0–5 start to the season, the Titans rallied from a 13–0 halftime deficit to beat the Colts 26–20. Simmons contributed two sacks, six tackles, and a forced fumble and recovery; head coach Robert Saleh also credited Simmons with giving a locker room speech at halftime that motivated the team for their comeback. In what would be Simmons' final game as a Titan, a 27–24 loss to the Browns, he had four tackles and a pass deflection.

Across seven games in his last season with Tennessee, Simmons recorded 38 tackles (20 solo), four sacks, four passes defended, a forced fumble, and fumble recovery.

=== Chicago Bears ===
Simmons and a 2028 fifth-round draft pick were traded to the Chicago Bears on October 29, 2026, in exchange for the Bears' 2027 and 2028 first-round selections and a 2027 fourth rounder.

==== 2026 season ====
In his Bears debut, on Monday Night Football against the reigning champion Seattle Seahawks, Simmons recorded a sack, six tackles, and a pass deflection as Chicago won 34–17. He added another sack in the following week's win over Tampa Bay to go with four tackles and another pass defended. In Week 11, he sacked Shough three times to help the Bears beat the Saints 21–13. Simmons was the first Bears player to record at least four sacks in his first three games since Khalil Mack in 2018.

== Career statistics ==
Legend
	Led the league
**Bold**	Career high

=== NFL ===
==== Regular season ====
Year	Team	Games		Tackles						Fumbles				Interceptions						Receiving				
Year	Team	GP	GS	Cmb	Solo	Ast	Sck	TFL	Sfty	FF	FR	Yds	TD	Int	Yds	Avg	Lng	TD	PD	Rec	Yds	Avg	Lng	TD
2019	TEN	9	7	32	18	14	2.0	4	0	0	0	0	0	0	0	0.0	0	0	1	0	0	0.0	0	0
2020	TEN	15	15	49	24	25	3.0	3	0	1	**3**	0	0	0	0	0.0	0	0	5	0	0	0.0	0	0
2021	TEN	17	17	54	**42**	12	8.5	12	0	0	0	0	0	0	0	0.0	0	0	6	0	0	0.0	0	0
2022	TEN	15	15	54	25	29	7.5	9	0	1	0	0	0	0	0	0.0	0	0	**7**	0	0	0.0	0	0
2023	TEN	12	12	44	30	14	5.5	10	0	1	1	**2**	0	0	0	0.0	0	0	1	**1**	**2**	**2.0**	**2**	**1**
2024	TEN	16	16	**76**	41	**35**	5.0	11	0	2	2	0	0	0	0	0.0	0	0	4	0	0	0.0	0	0
2025	TEN	15	15	67	39	28	**11.0**	**17**	**1**	**3**	0	0	0	0	0	0.0	0	0	3	**1**	1	1.0	1	**1**
2026	TEN	7	7	38	20	18	4.0	6	0	1	1	0	0	0	0	0.0	0	0	4	**1**	1	1.0	1	**1**
2026	CHI	2	2	10	6	4	2.0	3	0	0	0	0	0	0	0	0.0	0	0	2	0	0	0.0	0	0
Career		108	106	424	245	170	48.5	75	1	9	7	2	0	0	0	0.0	0	0	33	2	3	1.5	2	3

==== Postseason ====
Year	Team	Games		Tackles						Fumbles				Interceptions					
Year	Team	GP	GS	Cmb	Solo	Ast	Sck	TFL	Sfty	FF	FR	Yds	TD	Int	Yds	Avg	Lng	TD	PD
2019	TEN	3	0	3	1	**2**	0.0	0	0	0	**1**	0	0	0	0	0.0	0	0	0
2020	TEN	1	1	3	2	1	0.0	1	0	0	0	0	0	0	0	0.0	0	0	0
2021	TEN	1	1	**8**	**7**	1	**3.0**	**3**	0	0	0	0	0	0	0	0.0	0	0	0
Career		5	2	14	10	4	3.0	4	0	0	1	0	0	0	0	0.0	0	0	0

=== College ===
Season	Team	Class	Pos	GP	Tackles					Interceptions					Fumbles			
Season	Team	Class	Pos	GP	Solo	Ast	Cmb	TfL	Sck	Int	Yds	Avg	TD	PD	FR	Yds	TD	FF
2016	Mississippi State	FR	DL	12	12	28	40	3	0.0	0	0	0.0	0	2	0	0	0	**2**
2017	Mississippi State	SO	DL	13	21	**39**	60	12	**5.0**	0	0	0.0	0	1	**2**	0	**1**	**2**
2018	Mississippi State	JR	DT	13	**25**	38	**63**	**18**	2.0	0	0	0.0	0	**4**	0	0	0	1
Career				38	58	105	163	33	7.0	0	0	0.0	0	7	2	0	1	5

== Personal life ==
In college, Simmons was a two-time member of the SEC Academic Honor Roll. Simmons' brother, Dylan Bradley, played football at Southern Miss and then spent time with the Minnesota Vikings while his uncle, Jason Hatcher, played 10 total seasons with the Dallas Cowboys and Washington Redskins. Away from football, Simmons enjoys fishing and spending time outdoors. He has a son named Jeffery Jr. and daughter named Mulani, for whom he wears brightly colored sleeves (orange with the Bears, red with the Titans) while he plays so she can spot him on the field. Simmons has two sisters, Brooke and Ashley.

On December 14, 2025, Simmons' home was broken into while the team was in Santa Clara, California to play the San Francisco 49ers.

== Controversies ==
=== Arrest for assault ===
In March 2016, during his senior year in high school, Simmons was arrested and pleaded no contest to assault after a video surfaced showing him repeatedly hitting a woman while she was on the ground during a fight with Simmons' sister and mother.

=== Spitting accusation ===
Following the 2019 Divisional Round game between the Tennessee Titans and Baltimore Ravens, Ravens' guard Marshal Yanda accused Simmons of spitting in his face during the game. This was the first and only time in Yanda's 13-year NFL career that he had publicly accused another player of anything.

"I do want to say another thing. No. 98 [Simmons] for the Titans - I had that guy spit in my face today. I just want to put him on notice in the media. I've never done this in my career, but I just want to let you know that there's a right way and a wrong way to play football. That guy did not do it the right way today."

— Marshal Yanda

The first time Simmons was asked about the event by a reporter during an interview before a practice the following week, Simmons did not directly deny the accusation.

“I know what I did and I know what I didn’t do. At this point in time — today is Wednesday — I’m focused on the Chiefs right now and helping my team win. What I did this past game, what I didn’t do this past game, is not going to help us win this week, so I’m focused on what I can do to win, and what I will do to help get this win this Sunday.”

— Jeffery Simmons

=== Obscene gesture at fans ===
At the end of the Titans–Philadelphia Eagles game on September 20, 2026, Simmons gestured at taunting Eagles fans in the Nissan Stadium stands by grabbing his crotch and yelling "suck my dick". Prior to the game, Simmons commented about making Eagles quarterback Jalen Hurts "be a quarterback" by limiting his scrambling. Both players were amicable when they met following the game.
