= Jurrell Casey =

American football player (born 1989)

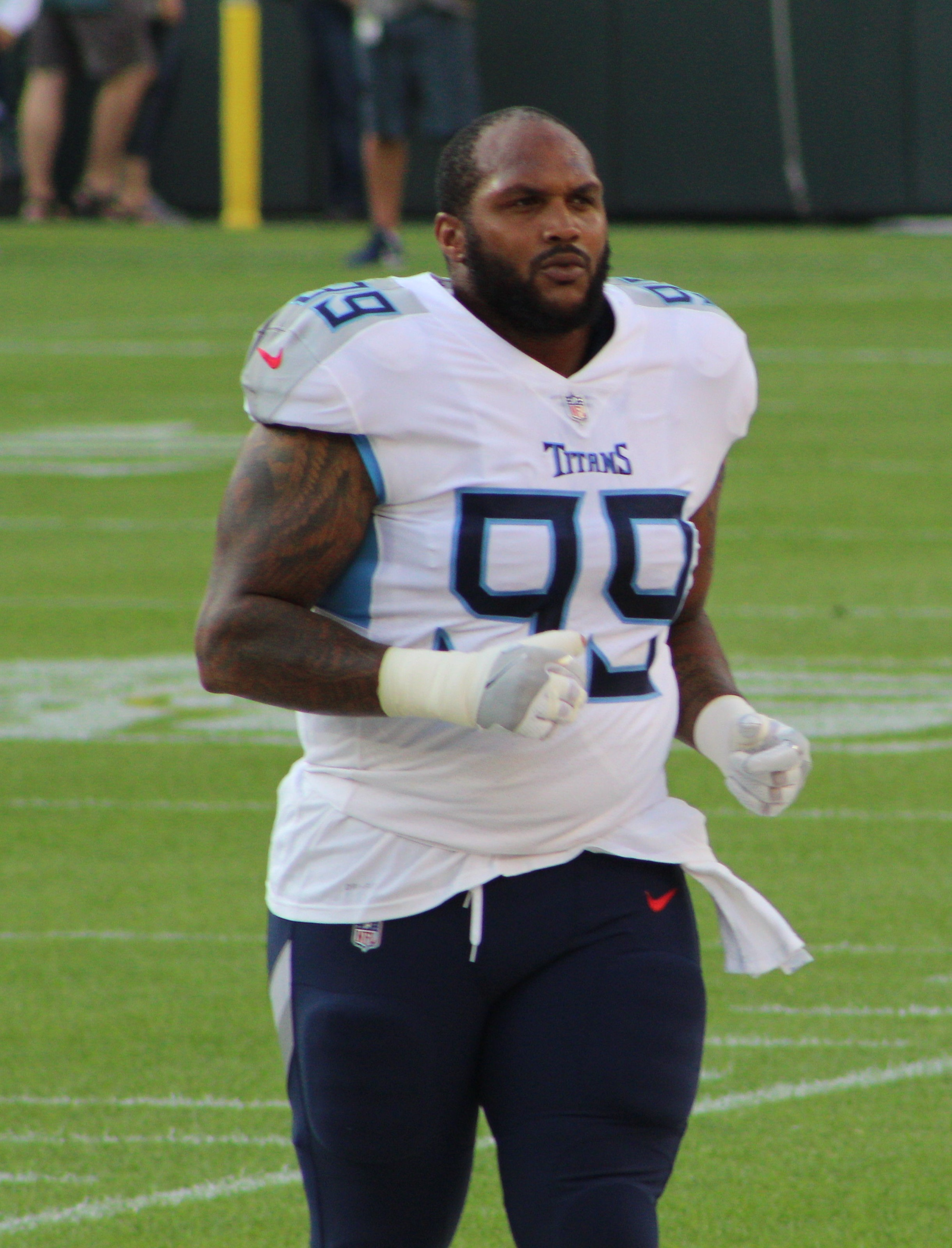
- Casey with the Tennessee Titans in 2018

No. 99
- Positions: Defensive tackle, defensive end

Personal information
- Born: December 5, 1989 (age 36); Long Beach, California, U.S.
- Listed height: 6 ft 1 in (1.85 m)
- Listed weight: 305 lb (138 kg)

Career information
- High school: Long Beach Polytechnic
- College: USC (2008–2010)
- NFL draft: 2011: 3rd round, 77th overall pick

Career history
- Tennessee Titans (2011–2019); Denver Broncos (2020)

Awards and highlights
- Second-team All-Pro (2013); 5× Pro Bowl (2015–2019); First-team All-Pac-10 (2010)

Career NFL statistics
- Total tackles: 507
- Sacks: 51.0
- Forced fumbles: 8
- Fumble recoveries: 5
- Stats at Pro Football Reference

Jurrell Juel Casey (born December 5, 1989) is an American former professional football player who played 10 seasons in the National Football League (NFL). He played college football for the USC Trojans, and was selected by the Tennessee Titans in the third round of the 2011 NFL draft. In nine seasons with the Titans as both a defensive tackle and a defensive end, he was an All-Pro in 2013 and a five-time Pro Bowl selection from 2015 to 2019. He played his 10th and final professional season for the Denver Broncos, but missed most of the season due to injury.

== College career ==
Casey played for the USC Trojans football team while attending the University of Southern California from 2008 to 2010. As a freshman in 2008, he played in 12 games for the Trojans recording 12 tackles and three forced fumbles. As a sophomore in 2009, Casey became a starter and was All-Pac-10 honorable mention. He was named First-team All-Pac-10 for the 2010 season.

== Professional career ==
=== Pre-draft ===
Casey was one of 26 defensive tackles to receive an invitation to the NFL Scouting Combine in Indianapolis, Indiana. He completed all of the combine drills and had a slower 40-yard dash than expected, after running in the 4.93–5.08 range before the combine. On March 30, 2011, Casey attended USC's pro day, along with Tyron Smith, Jordan Cameron, Butch Lewis, Ronald Johnson, Mitch Mustain, Shareece Wright, Malcolm Smith, Allen Bradford, C. J. Gable, David Ausberry, Stanley Havili, Mike Morgan, and six other prospects. He ran the 40-yard dash (4.97), 20-yard dash (2.88), and 10-yard dash (1.75) and lowered his time in all three, while also running positional drills for scouts and team representatives from 31 NFL teams, that included head coaches Jason Garrett (Cowboys) and Hue Jackson (Raiders). At the conclusion of the pre-draft process, Casey was projected to be a second or third round pick. He was ranked the seventh best defensive tackle by Bleacher Report and the 11th best defensive tackle prospect in the draft by NFLDraftScout.com.

Pre-draft measurables
Height	Weight	Arm length	Hand span	Wingspan	40-yard dash	10-yard split	20-yard split	20-yard shuttle	Three-cone drill	Vertical jump	Broad jump	Bench press
6 ft 0 5/8 in (1.84 m)	300 lb (136 kg)	32 in (0.81 m)	8 7/8 in (0.23 m)	6 ft 3 3/4 in (1.92 m)	4.97 s	1.75 s	2.88 s	4.78 s	7.51 s	27.5 in (0.70 m)	8 ft 5 in (2.57 m)	26 reps
All values from NFL Combine/Pro Day

=== Tennessee Titans ===
==== 2011–2013: Early career and Second–Team All-Pro ====
The Tennessee Titans selected Casey in the third round (77th overall) of the 2011 NFL draft. He was the 19th defensive linemen selected in 2011. On July 29, 2011, the Tennessee Titans signed Casey to a four-year, $2.73 million contract.

Throughout training camp, Casey competed against Tony Brown, Shaun Smith, Jason Jones, Jovan Haye, Karl Klug, and Sen'Derrick Marks for the starting defensive tackle job. Head coach Mike Munchak named him the starting right defensive tackle along with Shaun Smith.

Casey made his first NFL start and his NFL debut in the season-opener at the Jacksonville Jaguars and finished the 16–14 loss with four combined tackles. He made his first career tackle with Barrett Ruud on running back Maurice Jones-Drew after a two-yard gain. On October 9, 2011, Casey recorded four combined tackles and made his first career sack on quarterback Ben Roethlisberger in the Titans lost to the Pittsburgh Steelers by a score of 38–17. On January 1, 2012, he collected a season-high six combined tackles and a season-high 1 1/2 sacks on Matt Schaub during the Titans' 23–22 loss at the Houston Texans. Casey finished his rookie year with 52 combined tackles (39 solo), five tackles for a loss, 2 1/2 sacks, a pass deflection, and 22 special teams tackles in 16 games and 15 starts.

Casey returned in 2012 and competed against Shaun Smith, Sen'Derrick Marks, and Karl Klug to maintain his starting defensive tackle position. He was named the starting right defensive tackle, opposite Sen'Derrick Marks, to begin the regular season.

On September 23, Casey recorded a season-high seven combined tackles during a 44–41 loss to the Detroit Lions. In Week 9, he collected five combined tackles, sacked quarterback Jay Cutler, and caused a forced fumble in a 51–20 loss to the Chicago Bears. On December 30, 2012, Casey made five solo tackles and recorded his third sack of the season on Chad Henne during the Titans' 38–20 victory over the Jacksonville Jaguars. He finished the season with a total of 54 combined tackles (34 solo), three sacks, and forced fumble in 16 games and 16 starts.

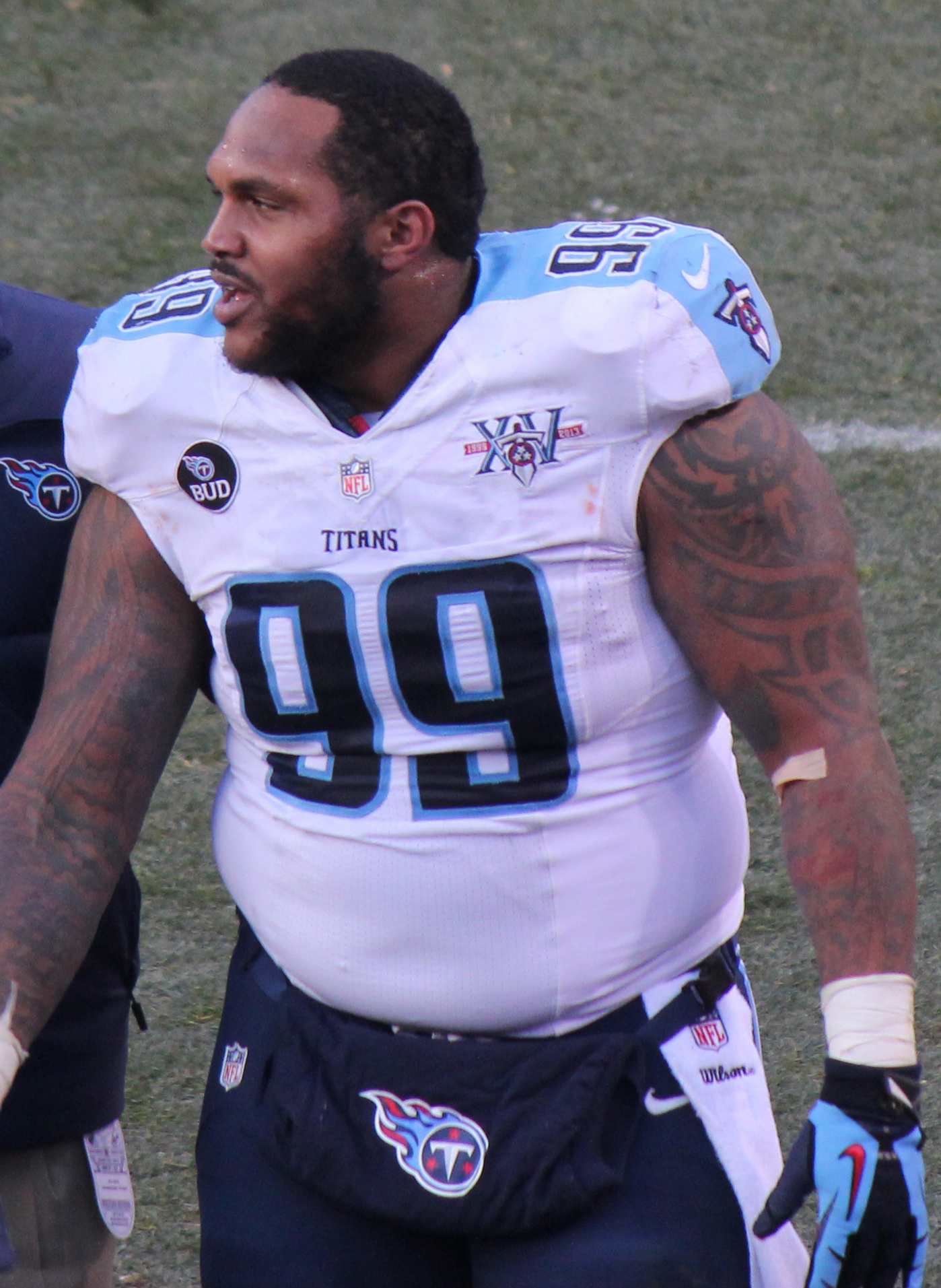
Casey in 2013

Throughout training camp, he competed with Sammie Lee Hill, Karl Klug, and Mike Martin for the role as starting defensive tackle after Sen'Derrick Marks departed for the Jacksonville Jaguars in free agency. Mike Munchak named him the starting right defensive tackle for the third consecutive season, along with Sammie Lee Hill.

He started in the Tennessee Titans' season-opener at the Pittsburgh Steelers and recorded three solo tackles and sacked Ben Roethliserger twice during a 16–9 victory. On November 3, 2013, Casey recorded a season-high six solo tackles and had two sacks on St. Louis Rams' quarterback Kellen Clemens in Tennessee's 28–21 victory. The following week, he made six solo tackles and sacked Chad Henne during a 29–27 loss to the Jacksonville Jaguars. This marled his third consecutive game with a sack and was his seventh sack of the season. In Week 15, Casey recorded a season-high nine combined tackles and had 1 1/2 sacks on Arizona Cardinals' quarterback Carson Palmer in the Titans' 37–34 overtime loss. The following week, Casey suffered a knee injury during a 20–16 loss at the Jacksonville Jaguars. He missed the following game of the season due to the injury. He completed the 2013 season with 55 combined tackles (38 solo), a career-high 10 1/2 sacks, two pass deflections, and a forced fumble in 15 games and 14 starts. Casey and teammate Delanie Walker were both voted to the 2014 Pro Bowl as alternates, but both declined ahead of time, stating they wouldn't attend as alternate. Many media members and fans saw his vote as an alternate as a snub after his 10 1/2 sack season. Head coach Mike Munchak was fired after the Titans finished with a 7–9 record.

==== 2014–2019: Pro Bowl seasons ====
On August 27, 2014, the Titans signed Casey to a four-year, $36 million contract extension with $20.5 million guaranteed and a signing bonus of $10.6 million.

Casey entered the 2014 season slated as the starting defensive tackle. The Titans' new head coach Ken Whisenhunt and defensive coordinator Ray Horton opted to implement a hybrid 3-4 defense. On September 14, 2014, Casey made two solo tackles and two sacks on quarterback Tony Romo as the Titans lost to the Dallas Cowboys by a score of 26–10. During a Week 6 matchup against the Jacksonville Jaguars, Casey collected a season-high nine combined tackles and made two sacks on quarterback Blake Bortles during a 16–14 victory. He was named AFC Defensive Player of the Week for his game against the Jaguars. Casey finished the 2014 season with a career-high 68 combined tackles (45 solo) and five sacks in 16 games and 16 starts. Casey was voted to the 2015 Pro Bowl for the second consecutive season as an alternate, but again declined ahead of time. He was ranked 96th by his fellow players on the NFL Top 100 Players of 2015.

Casey returned as the de facto starting right defensive tackle in his second consecutive season under head coach Ken Whisenhunt. He started in the season-opener at the Tampa Bay Buccaneers and made three solo tackles and a sack on Jameis Winston during a 42–14 victory. In Week 5, he made six combined tackles and a season-high 1.5 sacks on quarterback Tyrod Taylor in a narrow 14–13 loss to the Buffalo Bills. On December 13, Casey collected a season-high seven combined tackles in the Titans' 30–8 loss at the New York Jets. On January 25, 2016, it was announced that Casey and teammate Delanie Walker would appear in the 2016 Pro Bowl in place of Carolina Panthers' tight end Greg Olsen and defensive tackle Kawann Short since they were unable to play due to Panthers appearing in Super Bowl 50. On January 31, 2016, Casey appeared in the Pro Bowl for Deion Sanders' team and recorded two combined tackles, a pass deflection, and an interception in their 49–27 victory. After a 1–6 record, head coach Ken Whisenhunt was fired and replaced by tight ends coach Mike Mularkey.

Casey remained the starting right defensive end under new head coach Mike Mularkey and new defensive coordinator Dick LeBeau. On October 9, he recorded two solo tackles and two sacks on quarterback Ryan Tannehill as the Titans defeated the Miami Dolphins by a score of 30–17. In Week 9, Casey made a season-high eight combined tackles as the Titans lost 43–35 at the San Diego Chargers. He was inactive for the Titans' Week 14 victory over the Denver Broncos after suffering a sprained foot. On December 20, 2016, Casey was named to the 2017 Pro Bowl, along with teammates DeMarco Murray, Brian Orakpo, Taylor Lewan, and Delanie Walker. Casey recorded 44 combined tackles, five sacks, and five pass deflections in 15 games and 15 starts. On January 1, 2017, Casey collected six combined tackles, deflected a pass, and made two sacks on quarterback Brock Osweiler as the Titans defeated the Houston Texans by a score of 24–17. Pro Football Focus gave Casey an overall grade of 87.1, which ranked him tenth among all qualified interior defensive linemen in 2016. He was ranked 86th on the NFL Top 100 Players of 2017.

On July 28, 2017, the Tennessee Titans signed Casey to a four-year, $60.4 million contract extension, that includes $24 million guaranteed and a signing bonus of $8 million.

On October 1, Casey recorded seven combined tackles and sacked quarterback Deshaun Watson during a 57–14 loss to the Houston Texans. In Week 14, he collected five solo tackles and two sacks on quarterback Blaine Gabbert in a 12–7 loss to the Arizona Cardinals. On December 19, 2017, Casey was named to his third straight Pro Bowl. He finished the 2017 season with 60 combined tackles (41 solo), six sacks, a pass deflection, and a forced fumble in 16 games and 16 starts. Pro Football Focus gave Casey an overall grade of 89.7, which ranked ninth among all qualified interior defensive linemen in 2017. He was ranked 66th by his peers on the NFL Top 100 Players of 2018.

In 2018, Casey started the first 15 games before suffering a knee injury in Week 16. He was placed on injured reserve on December 24, 2018. He finished the season with 62 tackles, seven sacks, and two forced fumbles, on his way to his fourth straight Pro Bowl. Due to rehabbing his injury, Casey did not participate in the Pro Bowl. He was ranked 92nd by his fellow players on the NFL Top 100 Players of 2019.

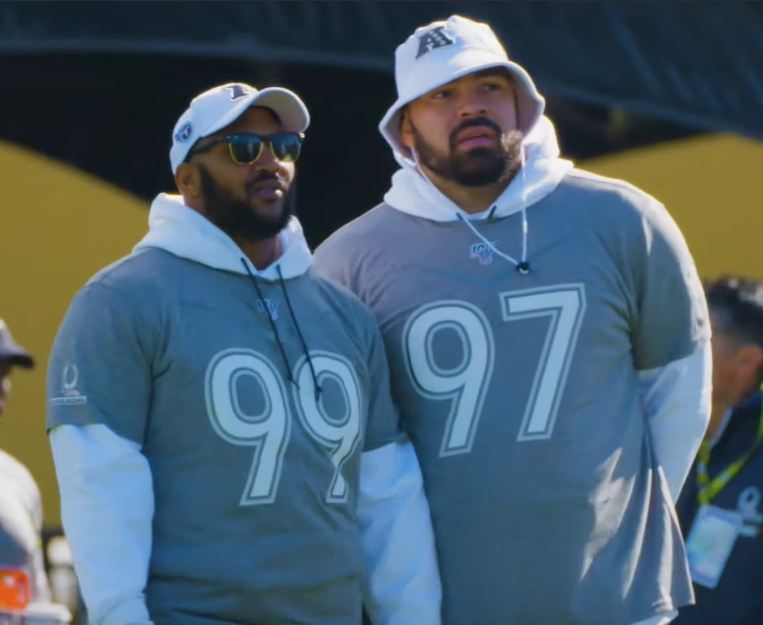
Casey alongside Cameron Heyward at the 2020 Pro Bowl

During Week 4 against the Atlanta Falcons, Casey recorded his first sack of the season on Matt Ryan as the Titans won on the road 24–10. Three weeks later against the Los Angeles Chargers, he recovered a fumble forced by teammate Wesley Woodyard on running back Melvin Gordon on the goal line late in the fourth quarter which sealed a 23–20 victory. In the next game against the Tampa Bay Buccaneers, Casey recorded his second sack of the season on Jameis Winston as the Titans won 27–23. He missed Weeks 9 and 10 due to a shoulder injury. During a Week 14 31–17 road victory over the Indianapolis Colts, Casey recorded his third sack of the season. From Weeks 16–17, he recorded one sack in each game. He finished the 2019 season with five sacks, 44 total tackles (26 solo), one forced fumble, and two fumble recoveries in 14 games.

Casey continued his momentum in the playoffs. In the divisional round of the playoffs against the Baltimore Ravens, he sacked quarterback Lamar Jackson twice, one of which was a strip-sack that was recovered by teammate Jeffery Simmons. The Titans went on to win on the road 28–12. He was ranked 71st by his fellow players on the NFL Top 100 Players of 2020.

On January 20, 2020, Casey was named to his fifth consecutive Pro Bowl, replacing the Super Bowl-bound Chris Jones.

=== Denver Broncos ===
On March 19, 2020, Casey was traded to the Denver Broncos in exchange for a seventh-round selection in the 2020 NFL draft. Recalling the trade, Casey said the Titans "discarded him like trash". He was placed on injured reserve on September 28, 2020, with a torn biceps. He was moved to the reserve/COVID-19 list by the team on November 7, and moved back to injured reserve on November 20. Casey appeared in just three games during the 2020 season and he was released by the Broncos on February 25, 2021.

=== Retirement ===
Casey announced his retirement from the NFL on September 2, 2021.

== NFL career statistics ==
Legend
**Bold**	Career high

=== Regular season ===
Year	Team	Games		Tackles				Interceptions						Fumbles			
Year	Team	GP	GS	Cmb	Solo	Ast	Sck	Int	Yds	Avg	Lng	TD	PD	FF	FR	Yds	TD
2011	TEN	16	15	52	39	13	0.0	0	0	0.0	0	0	1	1	1	0	0
2012	TEN	16	16	54	34	20	3.0	0	0	0.0	0	0	0	**2**	0	0	0
2013	TEN	15	14	55	38	17	**10.5**	0	0	0.0	0	0	2	1	1	0	0
2014	TEN	16	16	**68**	**46**	22	5.0	0	0	0.0	0	0	0	0	0	0	0
2015	TEN	16	16	54	34	20	7.0	0	0	0.0	0	0	3	0	0	0	0
2016	TEN	15	15	44	31	13	5.0	0	0	0.0	0	0	**5**	0	0	0	0
2017	TEN	16	16	60	41	19	6.0	0	0	0.0	0	0	1	1	0	0	0
2018	TEN	15	15	62	36	**26**	7.0	0	0	0.0	0	0	0	**2**	1	**1**	0
2019	TEN	14	14	44	26	16	5.0	0	0	0.0	0	0	0	1	**2**	0	0
2020	DEN	3	3	14	7	7	0.0	0	0	0.0	0	0	3	0	0	0	0
Career		142	140	507	332	175	51.0	0	0	0.0	0	0	15	8	5	1	0

=== Postseason ===
Year	Team	Games		Tackles				Interceptions						Fumbles			
Year	Team	GP	GS	Cmb	Solo	Ast	Sck	Int	Yds	Avg	Lng	TD	PD	FF	FR	Yds	TD
2017	TEN	2	2	7	3	4	0.0	0	0	0.0	0	0	**1**	0	0	0	0
2019	TEN	3	3	**8**	**6**	**2**	**2.5**	0	0	0.0	0	0	**1**	**1**	0	0	0
Career		5	5	15	9	6	2.5	0	0	0.0	0	0	2	1	0	0	0

== Personal life ==
Casey is a Christian. Casey is married to Ryann Casey. They have two sons.

Jurrell and Ryann Casey created The Casey Fund, a charitable organization that "supports community-based organizations that address the needs of at-risk youth and formerly incarcerated individuals".

Casey and teammate Wesley Woodyard coach a women's flag football team composed of wives and significant others of Titans players.
