= 2019 Tennessee Titans season =

60th season in franchise history

- Owner: Amy Adams Strunk
- General manager: Jon Robinson
- Head coach: Mike Vrabel
- Offensive coordinator: Arthur Smith
- Defensive coordinator: Dean Pees
- Home stadium: Nissan Stadium

Results
- Record: 9–7
- Division place: 2nd AFC South
- Playoffs: Won Wild Card Playoffs (at Patriots) 20–13; Won Divisional Playoffs (at Ravens) 28–12; Lost AFC Championship (at Chiefs) 24–35
- All-Pros: 3: RB Derrick Henry (2nd team); FLEX Derrick Henry (2nd team); P Brett Kern (1st team)
- Pro Bowlers: 4: QB Ryan Tannehill (alternate); RB Derrick Henry; DE Jurrell Casey (alternate); P Brett Kern

Uniform
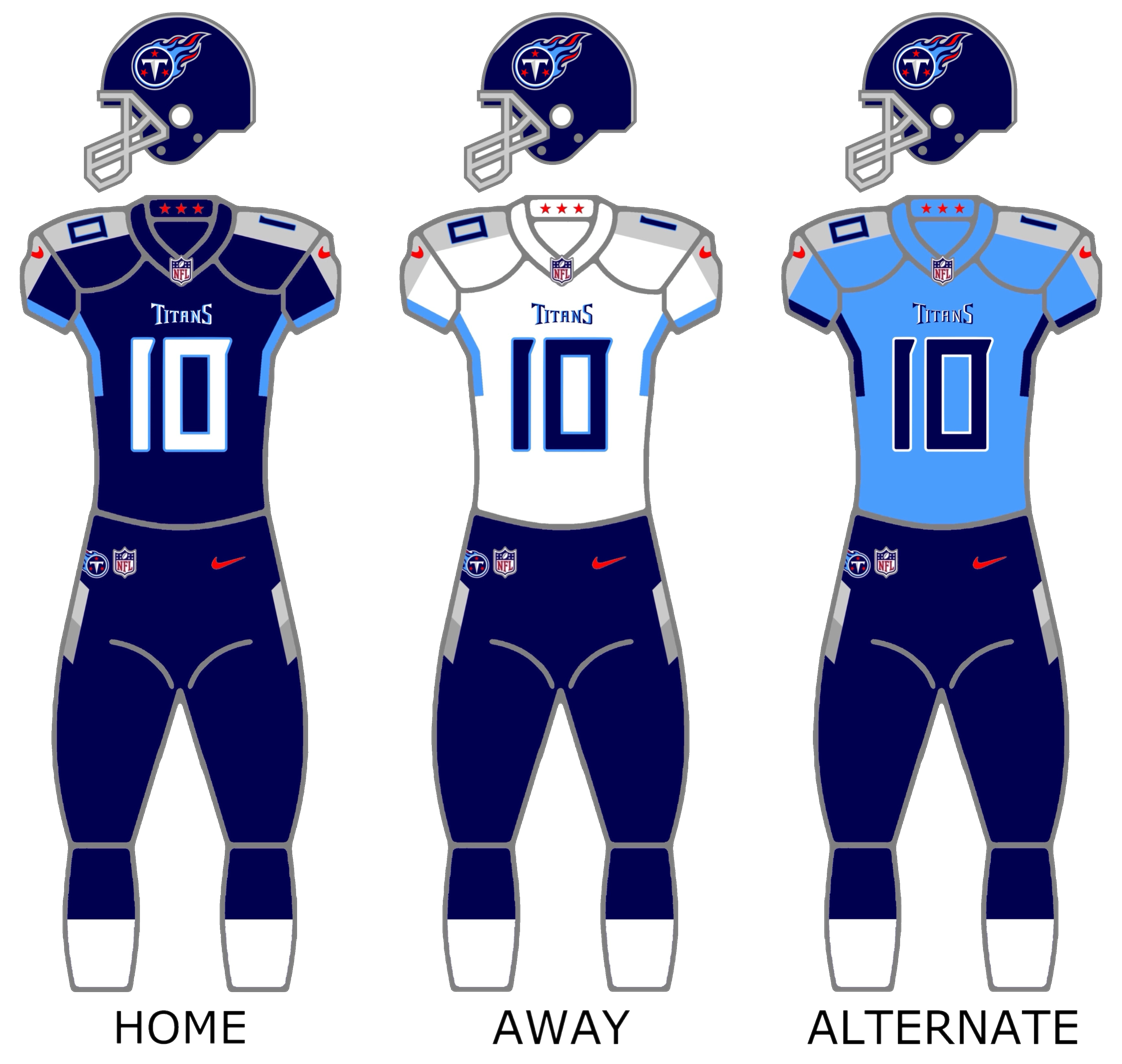

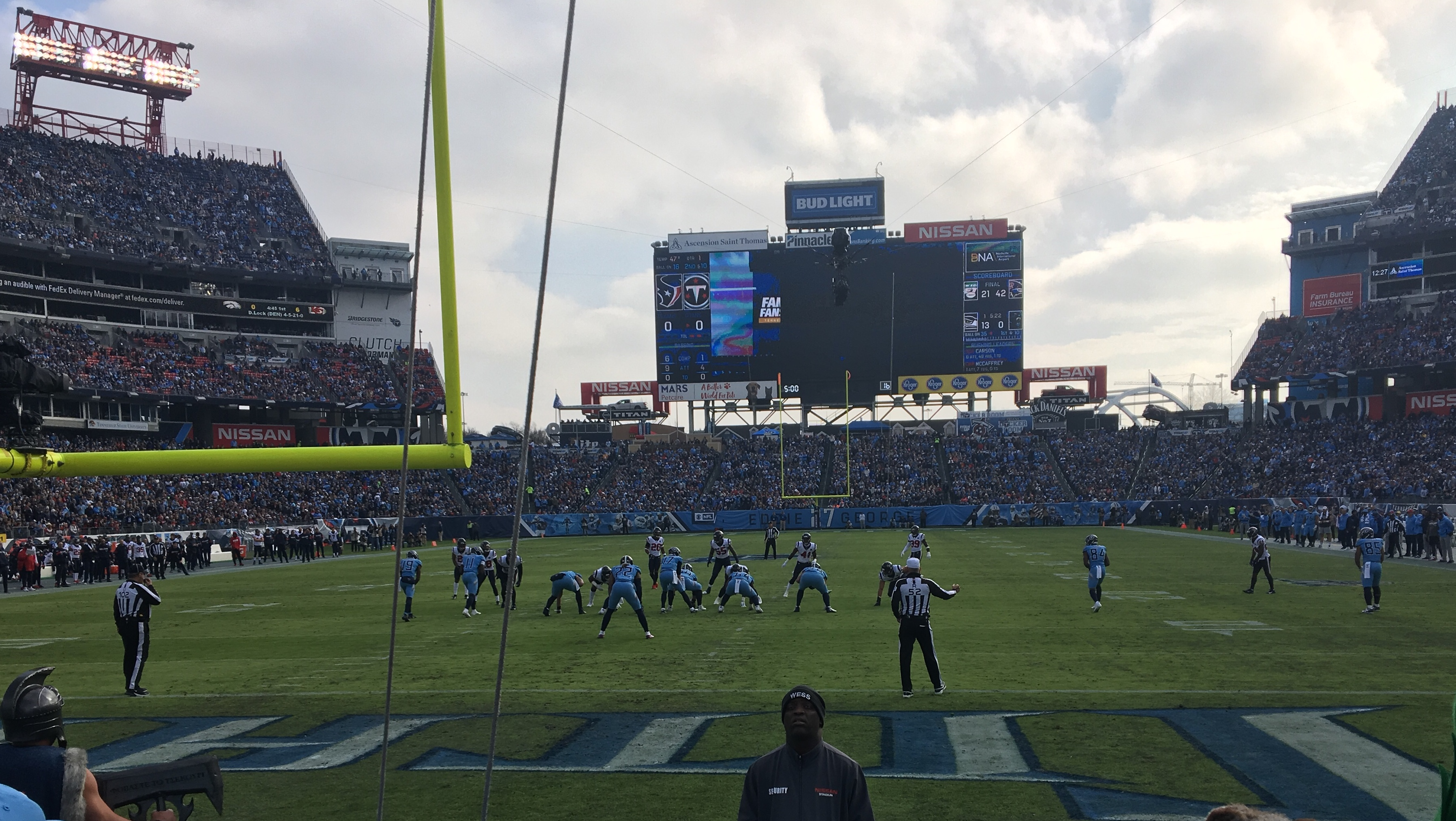
The Tennessee Titans vs. the Houston Texans at Nissan Stadium in Week 15.

The 2019 season was the Tennessee Titans' 50th in the National Football League (NFL) and their 60th overall. It marks the franchise's 23rd season in the state of Tennessee, their 22nd in Nashville and their second full season under head coach Mike Vrabel. Despite a 2–4 start resulting in the benching of quarterback Marcus Mariota, the Titans turned their season around with ex-Dolphins quarterback Ryan Tannehill. With the boost of Tannehill, what was a previously bottom-tier NFL offense transformed into one of its best, helping the Titans to a strong 7–3 finish, making them 9–7 for the fourth straight year and allowing for their return to the postseason after a one-year absence.

Riding the rushing champion Derrick Henry into the playoffs, the Titans defeated the defending Super Bowl champion New England Patriots in the wild-card round by a score of 20–13, advancing them to the divisional round. The Titans then upset the heavily favored top-seeded Baltimore Ravens 28–12, advancing to their first AFC Championship Game since 2002, and becoming the first team since both the New York Jets and Green Bay Packers in 2010 to advance to a Conference Championship Game as a sixth seed. However, the Titans' Cinderella season came to an end when they fell to the eventual Super Bowl LIV champion Kansas City Chiefs 35–24 in the AFC Championship Game. As of the 2025 season, this is the most recent season the Titans earned a playoff win.

== Coaching changes ==
On January 8, 2019, Titans offensive coordinator Matt LaFleur was hired as the head coach of the Green Bay Packers. On January 21, 2019, Titans tight ends coach Arthur Smith was promoted to the role of offensive coordinator.

== Draft ==
2019 Tennessee Titans Draft
Round	Selection	Player	Position	College
1	19	Jeffery Simmons	DT	Mississippi State
2	51	A. J. Brown	WR	Ole Miss
3	82	Nate Davis	OG	Charlotte
4	116	Amani Hooker	S	Iowa
5	168	D'Andre Walker	OLB	Georgia
6	188	David Long Jr.	ILB	West Virginia

2019 Tennessee Titans Draft Trades
Draft pick year	Round	Overall	Team	Received
2019	4	121	to New York Jets	Received New York's 2019 fourth-round selection (No. 116 overall) and fifth-round selection (No. 168 overall).
2019	5	157	to New York Jets	Received New York's 2019 fourth-round selection (No. 116 overall) and fifth-round selection (No. 168 overall).
2019	6	191	to Baltimore Ravens	Received linebacker Kamalei Correa.
2019	7	233	to Miami Dolphins	Received Miami's 2019 sixth-round selection (No. 188 overall) and quarterback Ryan Tannehill.
2020	4	135	to Miami Dolphins	Received Miami's 2019 sixth-round selection (No. 188 overall) and quarterback Ryan Tannehill.

=== Undrafted free agents ===
2019 Tennessee Titans Undrafted Free Agents
Name	Position	School
Alex Barnes	RB	Kansas State
Amani Bledsoe	DE	Oklahoma
Hamp Cheevers	CB	Boston College
Cody Conway	OT	Syracuse
Jonathan Crawford	S	Indiana
A.T. Hall	OT	Stanford
Braxton Hoyett	NT	Mississippi State
Isaiah Mack	DT	Chattanooga
Kareem Orr	CB	Chattanooga
Anthony Ratliff-Williams	WR	North Carolina
Derick Roberson	OLB	Sam Houston State
Taj-Amir Torres	CB	Boston College
Isaac Zico	WR	Purdue
JoJo Tillery	S	Wofford

Made regular season roster

== Staff ==
2019 Tennessee Titans staff
Front office: Owner – KSA Industries; Controlling owner – Amy Adams Strunk; President, chairman and CEO – Steve Underwood; Executive vice president/general manager – Jon Robinson; Vice president of football administration – Vin Marino; Vice president of player personnel – Ryan Cowden; Director of college scouting – Jon Salge; Director of pro scouting – Brian Gardner; Assistant director of pro scouting – Kevin Turks; Head coaches: Head coach – Mike Vrabel; Offensive coaches: Offensive coordinator – Arthur Smith; Quarterbacks – Pat O'Hara; Running backs – Tony Dews; Wide receivers – Rob Moore; Tight ends – Todd Downing; Offensive line – Keith Carter; Assistant offensive line – Mike Sullivan; Offensive assistant – Luke Steckel; Offensive quality control – Chandler Henley	Defensive coaches: Defensive coordinator – Dean Pees; Defensive line – Terrell Williams; Outside linebackers – Shane Bowen; Inside linebackers – Tyrone McKenzie; Secondary − Kerry Coombs; Defensive assistant – Scott Booker; Defensive assistant – Ryan Crow; Defensive quality control – Matt Pees; Special teams coaches: Special teams coordinator – Craig Aukerman; Assistant special teams – Matt Edwards; Strength and conditioning: Strength and conditioning – Frank Piraino; Strength and conditioning assistant – Brian Bell; Strength and conditioning assistant – Mondary Gee

== Final roster ==
2019 Tennessee Titans roster
Quarterbacks (QB): 8 Marcus Mariota; 17 Ryan Tannehill; Running backs (RB): 41 Khari Blasingame; 22 Derrick Henry; 33 Dion Lewis; Wide receivers (WR): 11 A. J. Brown; 84 Corey Davis; 12 Rashard Davis; 16 Cody Hollister; 10 Adam Humphries; 15 Darius Jennings; 14 Kalif Raymond; 19 Tajae Sharpe; Tight ends (TE): 86 Anthony Firkser; 85 MyCole Pruitt; 81 Jonnu Smith	Offensive linemen (OL): 78 Jack Conklin T; 64 Nate Davis G; 75 Jamil Douglas G/C; 60 Ben Jones C; 71 Dennis Kelly T; 77 Taylor Lewan T; 66 Kevin Pamphile G; 76 Rodger Saffold G; Defensive linemen (DL): 99 Jurrell Casey DE; 92 Matt Dickerson DE; 96 Joey Ivie NT; 94 Austin Johnson NT; 90 DaQuan Jones NT; 97 Isaiah Mack DE; 98 Jeffery Simmons DE	Linebackers (LB): 53 Daren Bates ILB; 55 Jayon Brown ILB; 44 Kamalei Correa OLB; 54 Rashaan Evans ILB; 93 Reggie Gilbert OLB; 58 Harold Landry OLB; 51 David Long Jr. ILB; 50 Derick Roberson OLB; 59 Wesley Woodyard ILB; Defensive backs (DB): 35 Tramaine Brock CB; 31 Kevin Byard FS; 29 Dane Cruikshank FS; 37 Amani Hooker SS; 25 Adoree' Jackson CB; 46 Joshua Kalu CB; 26 Logan Ryan CB; 36 LeShaun Sims CB; 23 Tye Smith CB; 24 Kenny Vaccaro SS; Special teams (ST): 48 Beau Brinkley LS; 6 Brett Kern P; 7 Greg Joseph K	Practice squad: 95 Amani Bledsoe DE; 28 Dalyn Dawkins RB; 38 Kenneth Durden CB; 57 Nigel Harris ILB; 49 Parker Hesse TE; 52 Daniel Munyer C; 20 Kareem Orr CB; 72 David Quessenberry G; 87 Trevion Thompson WR; 39 Shaun Wilson RB; 5 Logan Woodside QB (PS/I); Reserve: 12 Cameron Batson WR (IR); 21 Malcolm Butler CB (IR); 32 David Fluellen RB (IR); 30 Christopher Milton CB (IR); 4 Ryan Succop K (IR); 91 Cameron Wake OLB (IR); 42 D'Andre Walker OLB (IR); 82 Delanie Walker TE (IR); 40 Jordan Williams OLB (IR); Rookies in italics 53 active, 10 reserve, 10 practice squad

=== Team captains ===
- Marcus Mariota (QB)
- Ben Jones (C)
- Jurrell Casey (DL)
- Wesley Woodyard (LB)
- Kevin Byard (FS)

== Preseason ==
Week	Date	Opponent	Result	Record	Venue	Recap
1	August 8	at Philadelphia Eagles	W 27–10	1–0	Lincoln Financial Field	Recap
2	August 17	New England Patriots	L 17–22	1–1	Nissan Stadium	Recap
3	August 25	Pittsburgh Steelers	L 6–18	1–2	Nissan Stadium	Recap
4	August 29	at Chicago Bears	W 19–15	2–2	Soldier Field	Recap

== Regular season ==
=== Schedule ===
Week	Date	Opponent	Result	Record	Venue	Recap
1	September 8	at Cleveland Browns	**W** 43–13	1–0	First Energy Stadium	Recap
2	September 15	**Indianapolis Colts**	**L** 17–19	1–1	Nissan Stadium	Recap
3	September 19	at **Jacksonville Jaguars**	**L** 7–20	1–2	TIAA Bank Field	Recap
4	September 29	at Atlanta Falcons	**W** 24–10	2–2	Mercedes-Benz Stadium	Recap
5	October 6	Buffalo Bills	**L** 7–14	2–3	Nissan Stadium	Recap
6	October 13	at Denver Broncos	**L** 0–16	2–4	Empower Field at Mile High	Recap
7	October 20	Los Angeles Chargers	**W** 23–20	3–4	Nissan Stadium	Recap
8	October 27	Tampa Bay Buccaneers	**W** 27–23	4–4	Nissan Stadium	Recap
9	November 3	at Carolina Panthers	**L** 20–30	4–5	Bank of America Stadium	Recap
10	November 10	Kansas City Chiefs	**W** 35–32	5–5	Nissan Stadium	Recap
11	Bye					
12	November 24	**Jacksonville Jaguars**	**W** 42–20	6–5	Nissan Stadium	Recap
13	December 1	at **Indianapolis Colts**	**W** 31–17	7–5	Lucas Oil Stadium	Recap
14	December 8	at Oakland Raiders	**W** 42–21	8–5	RingCentral Coliseum	Recap
15	December 15	**Houston Texans**	**L** 21–24	8–6	Nissan Stadium	Recap
16	December 22	New Orleans Saints	**L** 28–38	8–7	Nissan Stadium	Recap
17	December 29	at **Houston Texans**	**W** 35–14	9–7	NRG Stadium	Recap

Note: Intra-division opponents are in bold text.

=== Game summaries ===
==== Week 1: at Cleveland Browns ====
Week One: Tennessee Titans at Cleveland Browns – Game summary

Quarter	1	2	3	4	Total
**Titans**	3	9	10	21	**43**
Browns	6	0	7	0	**13**

at FirstEnergy Stadium, Cleveland, Ohio

- Date: September 8
- Game time: 1:00 p.m. EDT/12:00 p.m. CDT
- Game weather: Partly cloudy, 71 °F (22 °C)
- Game attendance: 67,431
- Referee: Brad Allen
- TV announcers (CBS): Jim Nantz, Tony Romo, Tracy Wolfson and Gene Steratore
- Recap, Game Book

Game information

**First quarter**

- CLE – Dontrell Hilliard 4-yard run (kick failed, wide right), 10:11. Browns 6–0. **Drive: 8 plays, 73 yards, 4:49.**
- TEN – Cairo Santos 37-yard field goal, 6:32. Browns 6–3. **Drive: 7 plays, 73 yards, 3:39.**

**Second quarter**

- TEN – Derrick Henry 1-yard run (Cairo Santos kick), 9:39. Titans 10–6. **Drive: 11 plays, 87 yards, 5:10.**
- TEN – Baker Mayfield sacked in the end zone by Cameron Wake for a safety, 1:42. Titans 12–6.

**Third quarter**

- TEN – Cairo Santos 53-yard field goal, 11:53. Titans 15–6. **Drive: 5 plays, 44 yards, 3:07.**
- CLE – David Njoku 3-yard pass from Baker Mayfield (Austin Seibert kick), 2:10. Titans 15–13. **Drive: 6 plays, 61 yards, 3:42.**
- TEN – Derrick Henry 75-yard pass from Marcus Mariota (Cairo Santos kick), 1:57. Titans 22–13. **Drive: 1 play, 75 yards, 0:13.**

**Fourth quarter**

- TEN – Delanie Walker 11-yard pass from Marcus Mariota (Cairo Santos kick), 12:32. Titans 29–13. **Drive: 4 plays, 35 yards, 1:39.**
- TEN – Delanie Walker 7-yard pass from Marcus Mariota (Cairo Santos kick), 9:03. Titans 36–13. **Drive: 4 plays, 34 yards, 2:14.**
- TEN – Malcolm Butler 38-yard interception return (Cairo Santos kick), 3:02. Titans 43–13.

**Top passers**

- TEN – Marcus Mariota – 14/24, 248 yards, 3 TD
- CLE – Baker Mayfield – 25/38, 285 yards, TD, 3 INT

**Top rushers**

- TEN – Derrick Henry – 19 rushes, 84 yards, TD
- CLE – Nick Chubb – 16 rushes, 75 yards

**Top receivers**

- TEN – A. J. Brown – 3 receptions, 100 yards
- CLE – Odell Beckham Jr. – 7 receptions, 71 yards

Though favored to lose, the Titans surprised the league with a blowout win over the heavily hyped Browns in Cleveland with a strong second-half performance. The Titans defense intercepted QB Baker Mayfield three times, including once for a pick-six by CB Malcolm Butler, and sacked Mayfield four times, including once for a safety by Cameron Wake. Titans QB Marcus Mariota and RB Derrick Henry had efficient games, leading the team to four touchdowns on offense to complement the strong defensive performance.

==== Week 2: vs. Indianapolis Colts ====
Week Two: Indianapolis Colts at Tennessee Titans – Game summary

Quarter	1	2	3	4	Total
**Colts**	7	6	0	6	**19**
Titans	0	7	10	0	**17**

at Nissan Stadium, Nashville, Tennessee

- Date: September 15
- Game time: 12:00 p.m. CDT
- Game weather: Sunny, 93 °F (34 °C)
- Game attendance: 62,849
- Referee: Clete Blakeman
- TV announcers (CBS): Spero Dedes and Adam Archuleta
- Recap, Game Book

Game information

**First quarter**

- IND – Eric Ebron 3-yard pass from Jacoby Brissett (Adam Vinatieri kick), 8:53. Colts 7–0. **Drive: 7 plays, 78 yards, 4:19.**

**Second quarter**

- TEN – David Quessenberry 1-yard pass from Marcus Mariota (Cairo Santos kick), 14:55. Tied 7–7. **Drive: 10 plays, 72 yards, 5:31.**
- IND – Parris Campbell 12-yard pass from Jacoby Brissett (kick failed, wide left), 8:00. Colts 13–7. **Drive: 12 plays, 73 yards, 6:55.**

**Third quarter**

- TEN – Derrick Henry 1-yard run (Cairo Santos kick), 11:31. Titans 14–13. **Drive: 4 plays, 40 yards, 1:38.**
- TEN – Cairo Santos 49-yard field goal, 4:35. Titans 17–13. **Drive: 5 plays, 14 yards, 2:39.**

**Fourth quarter**

- IND – T. Y. Hilton 4-yard pass from Jacoby Brissett (kick failed, hit right upright), 4:38. Colts 19–17. **Drive: 4 plays, 69 yards, 2:03.**

**Top passers**

- IND – Jacoby Brissett – 17/28, 146 yards, 3 TD, INT
- TEN – Marcus Mariota – 19/28, 154 yards, TD

**Top rushers**

- IND – Jordan Wilkins – 5 rushes, 82 yards
- TEN – Derrick Henry – 15 rushes, 81 yards, TD

**Top receivers**

- IND – T. Y. Hilton – 4 receptions, 43 yards, TD
- TEN – Delanie Walker – 4 receptions, 39 yards

The Titans lost a close game 19–17, though a highlight of the game involved a passing touchdown from Mariota to offensive lineman David Quessenberry, who had recovered from a bout with cancer.

==== Week 3: at Jacksonville Jaguars ====
Week Three: Tennessee Titans at Jacksonville Jaguars – Game summary

Quarter	1	2	3	4	Total
Titans	0	0	0	7	**7**
**Jaguars**	14	0	3	3	**20**

at TIAA Bank Field, Jacksonville, Florida

- Date: September 19
- Game time: 8:20 p.m. EDT/7:20 p.m. CDT
- Game weather: Light rain, 73 °F (23 °C)
- Game attendance: 58,613
- Referee: Shawn Hochuli
- TV announcers (NFLN): Joe Buck, Troy Aikman, Erin Andrews and Kristina Pink
- Recap, Game Book

Game information

**First quarter**

- JAX – James O'Shaughnessy 7-yard pass from Gardner Minshew (Josh Lambo kick), 13:02. Jaguars 7–0. **Drive: 1 play, 7 yards, 0:05.**
- JAX – D. J. Chark 22-yard pass from Gardner Minshew (Josh Lambo kick), 6:36. Jaguars 14–0. **Drive: 6 plays, 62 yards, 3:32.**

**Second quarter**

- No scoring plays.

**Third quarter**

- JAX – Josh Lambo 40-yard field goal, 7:54. Jaguars 17–0. **Drive: 7 plays, 58 yards, 3:33.**

**Fourth quarter**

- TEN – Derrick Henry 1-yard run (Cairo Santos kick), 12:04. Jaguars 17–7. **Drive: 7 plays, 66 yards, 2:42.**
- JAX – Josh Lambo 48-yard field goal, 7:34. Jaguars 20–7. **Drive: 9 plays, 45 yards, 4:30.**

**Top passers**

- TEN – Marcus Mariota – 23/40, 304 yards
- JAX – Gardner Minshew – 20/30, 204 yards, 2 TD

**Top rushers**

- TEN – Derrick Henry – 17 rushes, 44 yards, TD
- JAX – Leonard Fournette – 15 rushes, 66 yards

**Top receivers**

- TEN – Adam Humphries – 6 receptions, 93 yards
- JAX – D. J. Chark – 4 receptions, 76 yards, TD

The Titans faced traditional rival Jacksonville in a Thursday night matchup for the fifth time in six years, but lost after an effective performance by Jaguars quarterback Gardner Minshew. With their second straight loss, the Titans fell to 1–2.

==== Week 4: at Atlanta Falcons ====
Week Four: Tennessee Titans at Atlanta Falcons – Game summary

Quarter	1	2	3	4	Total
**Titans**	14	10	0	0	**24**
Falcons	7	0	3	0	**10**

at Mercedes-Benz Stadium, Atlanta, Georgia

- Date: September 29
- Game time: 1:00 p.m. EDT/12:00 p.m. CDT
- Game weather: None (retractable roof closed)
- Game attendance: 72,108
- Referee: John Hussey
- TV announcers (CBS): Spero Dedes, Adam Archuleta and A.J. Ross
- Recap, Game Book

Game information

**First quarter**

- TEN – A. J. Brown 55-yard pass from Marcus Mariota (Cairo Santos kick), 11:57. Titans 7–0. **Drive: 1 play, 55 yards, 0:12.**
- ATL – Ito Smith 1-yard run (Matt Bryant kick), 8:30. Tied 7–7. **Drive: 6 plays, 85 yards, 3:27.**
- TEN – A. J. Brown 11-yard pass from Marcus Mariota (Cairo Santos kick), 2:26. Titans 14–7. **Drive: 13 plays, 75 yards, 6:04.**

**Second quarter**

- TEN – Cairo Santos 45-yard field goal, 10:03. Titans 17–7. **Drive: 5 plays, 35 yards, 2:09.**
- TEN – Corey Davis 23-yard pass from Marcus Mariota (Cairo Santos kick), 2:23. Titans 24–7. **Drive: 6 plays, 60 yards, 3:27.**

**Third quarter**

- ATL – Matt Bryant 42-yard field goal, 11:39. Titans 24–10. **Drive: 10 plays, 51 yards, 3:21.**

**Fourth quarter**

- No scoring plays.

**Top passers**

- TEN – Marcus Mariota – 18/27, 227 yards, 3 TD
- ATL – Matt Ryan – 35/53, 397 yards

**Top rushers**

- TEN – Derrick Henry – 27 rushes, 100 yards
- ATL – Devonta Freeman – 12 rushes, 28 yards

**Top receivers**

- TEN – A. J. Brown – 3 receptions, 94 yards, 2 TD
- ATL – Austin Hooper – 9 receptions, 130 yards

For the first time all season, Marcus Mariota was not sacked during a game, after being sacked a league-high 17 times in the first three games of the season. The Titans easily won 24–10 to improve to 2–2, despite Falcons QB Matt Ryan throwing for nearly 400 yards.

==== Week 5: vs. Buffalo Bills ====
Week Five: Buffalo Bills at Tennessee Titans – Game summary

Quarter	1	2	3	4	Total
**Bills**	0	7	0	7	**14**
Titans	0	0	7	0	**7**

at Nissan Stadium, Nashville, Tennessee

- Date: October 6
- Game time: 12:00 p.m. CDT
- Game weather: Cloudy, 77 °F (25 °C)
- Game attendance: 66,910
- Referee: Brad Rogers
- TV announcers (CBS): Spero Dedes and Adam Archuleta
- Recap, Game Book

Game information

**First quarter**

- No scoring plays.

**Second quarter**

- BUF – Lee Smith 8-yard pass from Josh Allen (Steven Hauschka kick), 2:36. Bills 7–0. **Drive: 6 plays, 60 yards, 2:46.**

**Third quarter**

- TEN – Derrick Henry 1-yard run (Cairo Santos kick), 7:02. Tied 7–7. **Drive: 7 plays, 38 yards, 3:28.**

**Fourth quarter**

- BUF – Duke Williams 7-yard pass from Josh Allen (Steven Hauschka kick), 9:46. Bills 14–7. **Drive: 6 plays, 77 yards, 2:37.**

**Top passers**

- BUF – Josh Allen – 23/32, 219 yards, 2 TD, INT
- TEN – Marcus Mariota – 13/22, 183 yards

**Top rushers**

- BUF – Frank Gore – 14 rushes, 60 yards
- TEN – Derrick Henry – 20 rushes, 78 yards, TD

**Top receivers**

- BUF – John Brown – 5 receptions, 75 yards
- TEN – Jonnu Smith – 1 reception, 57 yards

In a defense-heavy game, the Titans fell short partly due to four missed field goals from kicker Cairo Santos, who was released after this game. However, the offense was also held in check by a strong Bills defense, as Mariota was sacked five times despite offensive tackle Taylor Lewan returning from suspension. With their third straight loss to Buffalo, Tennessee fell to 2–3 on the year.

==== Week 6: at Denver Broncos ====
Week Six: Tennessee Titans at Denver Broncos – Game summary

Quarter	1	2	3	4	Total
Titans	0	0	0	0	**0**
**Broncos**	3	3	7	3	**16**

at Empower Field at Mile High, Denver, Colorado

- Date: October 13
- Game time: 3:25 p.m. CDT/2:25 p.m. MDT
- Game weather: Sunny, 69 °F (21 °C)
- Game attendance: 75,815
- Referee: Alex Kemp
- TV announcers (CBS): Andrew Catalon, James Lofton and John Schriffen
- Recap, Game Book

Game information

**First quarter**

- DEN – Brandon McManus 31-yard field goal, 10:16. Broncos 3–0. **Drive: 8 plays, 32 yards, 3:04.**

**Second quarter**

- DEN – Brandon McManus 53-yard field goal, 4:40. Broncos 6–0. **Drive: 5 plays, 50 yards, 2:44.**

**Third quarter**

- DEN – Phillip Lindsay 2-yard run (Brandon McManus kick), 4:56. Broncos 13–0. **Drive: 6 plays, 41 yards, 3:10.**

**Fourth quarter**

- DEN – Brandon McManus 48-yard field goal, 4:53. Broncos 16–0. **Drive: 8 plays, 49 yards, 4:17.**

**Top passers**

- TEN – Ryan Tannehill – 13/16, 144 yards, INT
- DEN – Joe Flacco – 18/28, 177 yards, INT

**Top rushers**

- TEN – Derrick Henry – 15 rushes, 28 yards
- DEN – Phillip Lindsay – 15 rushes, 70 yards, TD

**Top receivers**

- TEN – Adam Humphries – 6 receptions, 47 yards
- DEN – Courtland Sutton – 4 receptions, 76 yards

After an ineffective performance, Marcus Mariota was benched for backup quarterback Ryan Tannehill in the third quarter as the Titans were shut out 16–0. With the loss, Tennessee fell to 2–4.

==== Week 7: vs. Los Angeles Chargers ====
Week Seven: Los Angeles Chargers at Tennessee Titans – Game summary

Quarter	1	2	3	4	Total
Chargers	3	7	0	10	**20**
**Titans**	3	7	0	13	**23**

at Nissan Stadium, Nashville, Tennessee

- Date: October 20
- Game time: 3:05 p.m. CDT
- Game weather: Sunny, 77 °F (25 °C)
- Game attendance: 62,431
- Referee: Bill Vinovich
- TV announcers (CBS): Ian Eagle, Dan Fouts and Evan Washburn
- Recap, Game Book

Game information

**First quarter**

- TEN – Cody Parkey 45-yard field goal, 6:02. Titans 3–0. **Drive: 9 plays, 42 yards, 4:54.**
- LAC – Chase McLaughlin 29-yard field goal, 0:02. Tied 3–3. **Drive: 12 plays, 64 yards, 6:00.**

**Second quarter**

- LAC – Melvin Gordon 1-yard pass from Philip Rivers (Chase McLaughlin kick), 3:38. Chargers 10–3. **Drive: 14 plays, 94 yards, 7:37.**
- TEN – Corey Davis 8-yard pass from Ryan Tannehill (Cody Parkey kick), 0:23. Tied 10–10. **Drive: 8 plays, 86 yards, 3:15.**

**Third quarter**

- No scoring plays.

**Fourth quarter**

- TEN – Tajae Sharpe 5-yard pass from Ryan Tannehill (kick failed), 13:11. Titans 16–10. **Drive: 14 plays, 85 yards, 7:09.**
- LAC – Chase McLaughlin 50-yard field goal, 10:55. Titans 16–13. **Drive: 6 plays, 43 yards, 2:16.**
- TEN – Derrick Henry 11-yard run (Cody Parkey kick), 6:39. Titans 23–13. **Drive: 7 plays, 75 yards, 4:16.**
- LAC – Austin Ekeler 41-yard pass from Philip Rivers (Chase McLaughlin kick), 5:09. Titans 23–20. **Drive: 4 plays, 75 yards, 1:30.**

**Top passers**

- LAC – Philip Rivers – 24/38, 329 yards, 2 TD
- TEN – Ryan Tannehill – 23/29, 312 yards, 2 TD, INT

**Top rushers**

- LAC – Melvin Gordon – 16 rushes, 32 yards
- TEN – Derrick Henry – 22 rushes, 90 yards, TD

**Top receivers**

- LAC – Austin Ekeler – 7 receptions, 118 yards, TD
- TEN – Corey Davis – 6 receptions, 80 yards, TD

Ryan Tannehill made his first start at quarterback for the Titans in place of Marcus Mariota. After a back-and-forth first half, the Titans pulled ahead in the second half, holding a 23–13 fourth quarter lead before the Chargers scored a touchdown, cutting the Titans' lead to 3 with just over 5 minutes left. After forcing the Titans to turn the ball over on downs at the Los Angeles 49-yard line, the Chargers marched down the field to the Titans 1-yard line, but running backs Austin Ekeler and Melvin Gordon were unable to score, with the Titans defense forcing Gordon to fumble at the goal line. The Titans recovered the ball for a touchback, effectively sealing the win to improve to 3–4.

==== Week 8: vs. Tampa Bay Buccaneers ====
Week Eight: Tampa Bay Buccaneers at Tennessee Titans – Game summary

Quarter	1	2	3	4	Total
Buccaneers	3	12	8	0	**23**
**Titans**	14	3	3	7	**27**

at Nissan Stadium, Nashville, Tennessee

- Date: October 27
- Game time: 12:00 p.m. CDT
- Game weather: Cloudy, 59 °F (15 °C)
- Game attendance: 62,073
- Referee: Adrian Hill
- TV announcers (Fox): Kevin Kugler, Matt Millen and Shane Bacon
- Recap, Game Book

Game information

**First quarter**

- TB – Matt Gay 22-yard field goal, 11:28. Buccaneers 3–0. **Drive: 8 plays, 71 yards, 3:32.**
- TEN – Jonnu Smith 5-yard pass from Ryan Tannehill (Cody Parkey kick), 8:55. Titans 7–3. **Drive: 1 play, 10 yards, 0:03.**
- TEN – Tajae Sharpe 6-yard pass from Ryan Tannehill (Cody Parkey kick), 0:24. Titans 14–3. **Drive: 3 plays, 6 yards, 0:15.**

**Second quarter**

- TB – Matt Gay 48-yard field goal, 7:51. Titans 14–6. **Drive: 16 plays, 45 yards, 7:33.**
- TB – Matt Gay 24-yard field goal, 3:47. Titans 14–9. **Drive: 5 plays, 28 yards, 2:15.**
- TEN – Cody Parkey 51-yard field goal, 1:09. Titans 17–9. **Drive: 5 plays, 22 yards, 2:38.**
- TB – Mike Evans 9-yard pass from Jameis Winston (pass failed), 0:15. Titans 17–15. **Drive: 8 plays, 75 yards, 0:54.**

**Third quarter**

- TB – Mike Evans 2-yard pass from Jameis Winston (Jameis Winston-Chris Godwin pass), 11:11. Buccaneers 23–17. **Drive: 4 plays, 56 yards, 1:49.**
- TEN – Cody Parkey 42-yard field goal, 0:37. Buccaneers 23–20. **Drive: 10 plays, 68 yards, 4:43.**

**Fourth quarter**

- TEN – A. J. Brown 8-yard pass from Ryan Tannehill (Cody Parkey kick), 6:55. Titans 27–23. **Drive: 12 plays, 90 yards, 6:54.**

**Top passers**

- TB – Jameis Winston – 21/43, 301 yards, 2 TD, 2 INT
- TEN – Ryan Tannehill – 21/33, 193 yards, 3 TD

**Top rushers**

- TB – Jameis Winston – 8 rushes, 53 yards
- TEN – Derrick Henry – 16 rushes, 75 yards

**Top receivers**

- TB – Mike Evans – 11 receptions, 198 yards, 2 TD
- TEN – Jonnu Smith – 6 receptions, 78 yards, TD

The Titans rallied after the Buccaneers had themselves rallied from a 17–9 Tennessee lead. Jameis Winston's two touchdowns and a two-point conversion throw put the Buccaneers up 23–17 halfway through the third quarter. Cody Parkey's field goal put the Titans within 23–20 late in the third then Ryan Tannehill led a drive ending in an A. J. Brown touchdown catch that put Tennessee up 27–23. Winston fumbled on one Buccaneers possession, then was intercepted on Tampa's final possession.

==== Week 9: at Carolina Panthers ====
Week Nine: Tennessee Titans at Carolina Panthers – Game summary

Quarter	1	2	3	4	Total
Titans	0	0	7	13	**20**
**Panthers**	0	17	7	6	**30**

at Bank of America Stadium, Charlotte, North Carolina

- Date: November 3
- Game time: 1:00 p.m. EST/12:00 p.m. CST
- Game weather: Sunny, 58 °F (14 °C)
- Game attendance: 72,540
- Referee: Ronald Torbert
- TV announcers (CBS): Greg Gumbel, Trent Green and Melanie Collins
- Recap, Game Book

Game information

**First quarter**

- No scoring plays.

**Second quarter**

- CAR – Joey Slye 35-yard field goal, 13:28. Panthers 3–0. **Drive: 11 plays, 51 yards, 5:21.**
- CAR – Christian McCaffrey 7-yard pass from Kyle Allen (Joey Slye kick), 8:07. Panthers 10–0. **Drive: 4 plays, 15 yards, 1:42.**
- CAR – Curtis Samuel 12-yard pass from Kyle Allen (Joey Slye kick), 0:58. Panthers 17–0. **Drive: 12 plays, 90 yards, 6:06.**

**Third quarter**

- TEN – Derrick Henry 8-yard run (Ryan Succop kick), 10:11. Panthers 17–7. **Drive: 8 plays, 67 yards, 4:49.**
- CAR – Christian McCaffrey 1-yard run (Joey Slye kick), 5:16. Panthers 24–7. **Drive: 9 plays, 70 yards, 4:55.**

**Fourth quarter**

- TEN – Derrick Henry 23-yard pass from Ryan Tannehill (Ryan Succop kick), 14:14. Panthers 24–14. **Drive: 8 plays, 94 yards, 3:06.**
- CAR – Christian McCaffrey 58-yard run (kick blocked), 10:23. Panthers 30–14. **Drive: 6 plays, 83 yards, 3:51.**
- TEN – Ryan Tannehill 10-yard run (pass failed), 2:49. Panthers 30–20. **Drive: 10 plays, 61 yards, 3:12.**

**Top passers**

- TEN – Ryan Tannehill – 27/39, 331 yards, TD, 2 INT
- CAR – Kyle Allen – 17/32, 232 yards, 2 TD, INT

**Top rushers**

- TEN – Derrick Henry – 13 rushes, 63 yards, TD
- CAR – Christian McCaffrey – 24 rushes, 146 yards, 2 TD

**Top receivers**

- TEN – A. J. Brown – 4 receptions, 81 yards
- CAR – D. J. Moore – 7 receptions, 101 yards

==== Week 10: vs. Kansas City Chiefs ====
Week Ten: Kansas City Chiefs at Tennessee Titans – Game summary

Quarter	1	2	3	4	Total
Chiefs	10	3	9	10	**32**
**Titans**	0	13	7	15	**35**

at Nissan Stadium, Nashville, Tennessee

- Date: November 10
- Game time: 12:00 p.m. CST
- Game weather: Sunny, 63 °F (17 °C)
- Game attendance: 68,864
- Referee: Tony Corrente
- TV announcers (CBS): Jim Nantz, Tony Romo and Tracy Wolfson
- Recap, Game Book

Game information

**First quarter**

- KC – Travis Kelce 3-yard pass from Patrick Mahomes (Harrison Butker kick), 9:19. Chiefs 7–0. **Drive: 12 plays, 69 yards, 5:41.**
- KC – Harrison Butker 30-yard field goal, 4:43. Chiefs 10–0. **Drive: 4 plays, 8 yards, 3:05.**

**Second quarter**

- TEN – Anthony Firkser 9-yard pass from Ryan Tannehill (Ryan Succop kick), 10:23. Chiefs 10–7. **Drive: 4 plays, 73 yards, 1:34.**
- TEN – Rashaan Evans 53-yard fumble recovery (kick failed, wide left), 6:14. Titans 13–10.
- KC – Harrison Butker 41-yard field goal, 1:12. Tied 13–13. **Drive: 10 plays, 52 yards, 5:02.**

**Third quarter**

- KC – Tyreek Hill 11-yard pass from Patrick Mahomes (kick failed, wide left), 6:54. Chiefs 19–13. **Drive: 10 plays, 77 yards, 5:40.**
- TEN – Derrick Henry 68-yard run (Ryan Succop kick), 5:58. Titans 20–19. **Drive: 2 plays, 74 yards, 0:56.**
- KC – Harrison Butker 43-yard field goal, 1:58. Chiefs 22–20. **Drive: 10 plays, 50 yards, 4:00.**

**Fourth quarter**

- KC – Mecole Hardman 63-yard pass from Patrick Mahomes (Harrison Butker kick), 11:54. Chiefs 29–20. **Drive: 5 plays, 79 yards, 2:06.**
- TEN – Derrick Henry 1-yard run (Ryan Succop kick), 6:26. Chiefs 29–27. **Drive: 10 plays, 75 yards, 5:28.**
- KC – Harrison Butker 39-yard field goal, 3:14. Chiefs 32–27. **Drive: 7 plays, 53 yards, 3:12.**
- TEN – Adam Humphries 23-yard pass from Ryan Tannehill, 0:23. Titans 35–32. **Drive: 4 plays, 61 yards, 0:58.**

**Top passers**

- KC – Patrick Mahomes – 36/50, 446 yards, 3 TD
- TEN – Ryan Tannehill – 13/19, 181 yards, 2 TD

**Top rushers**

- KC – Damien Williams – 19 rushes, 77 yards
- TEN – Derrick Henry – 23 rushes, 188 yards, 2 TD

**Top receivers**

- KC – Tyreek Hill – 11 receptions, 157 yards, TD
- TEN – Jonnu Smith – 4 receptions, 30 yards

The game lead tied or changed six times and the Titans rallied to the win on two field goal miscues by the Chiefs, first on a blown snap, subsequent missed throw by Dustin Colquitt, and resulting intentional grounding penalty while Tennessee trailed 32–27, then following an Adam Humphries touchdown catch and Ryan Tannehill two-point conversion run, on a blocked Harrison Butker 52-yard attempt, the kick blocked by Joshua Kalu. It was the Titans’ eighth win in nine matchups to that point over teams coached by Andy Reid.

==== Week 12: vs. Jacksonville Jaguars ====
Week Twelve: Jacksonville Jaguars at Tennessee Titans – Game summary

Quarter	1	2	3	4	Total
Jaguars	0	3	8	9	**20**
**Titans**	0	7	28	7	**42**

at Nissan Stadium, Nashville, Tennessee

- Date: November 24
- Game time: 3:05 p.m. CST
- Game weather: Sunny, 52 °F (11 °C)
- Game attendance: 60,926
- Referee: Shawn Smith
- TV announcers (CBS): Ian Eagle, Dan Fouts and Evan Washburn
- Recap, Game Book

Game information

**First quarter**

- No scoring plays.

**Second quarter**

- TEN – Ryan Tannehill 21-yard run (Ryan Succop kick), 6:29. Titans 7–0. **Drive: 7 plays, 73 yards, 4:09.**
- JAX – Josh Lambo 49-yard field goal, 1:50. Titans 7–3. **Drive: 9 plays, 44 yards, 4:39.**

**Third quarter**

- TEN – Dennis Kelly 1-yard pass from Ryan Tannehill (Ryan Succop kick), 13:13. Titans 14–3. **Drive: 4 plays, 64 yards, 1:47.**
- TEN – Derrick Henry 74-yard run (Ryan Succop kick), 10:40. Titans 21–3. **Drive: 1 play, 74 yards, 0:11.**
- TEN – Derrick Henry 7-yard run (Ryan Succop kick), 10:24. Titans 28–3. **Drive: 1 play, 7 yards, 0:06.**
- TEN – A. J. Brown 65-yard pass from Ryan Tannehill (Ryan Succop kick), 6:57. Titans 35–3. **Drive: 3 plays, 80 yards, 1:26.**
- JAX – Leonard Fournette 1-yard run (Nick Foles–D. J. Chark pass), 2:23. Titans 35–11. **Drive: 12 plays, 74 yards, 4:34.**

**Fourth quarter**

- JAX – Leonard Fournette 1-yard run (pass failed), 11:50. Titans 35–17. **Drive: 7 plays, 56 yards, 2:57.**
- TEN – Ryan Tannehill 3-yard run (Ryan Succop kick), 9:47. Titans 42–17. **Drive: 4 plays, 40 yards, 2:03.**
- JAX – Josh Lambo 50-yard field goal, 4:48. Titans 42–20. **Drive: 13 plays, 56 yards, 4:59.**

**Top passers**

- JAX – Nick Foles – 32/48, 272 yards
- TEN – Ryan Tannehill – 14/18, 259 yards, 2 TD

**Top rushers**

- JAX – Leonard Fournette – 24 rushes, 97 yards, 2 TD
- TEN – Derrick Henry – 19 rushes, 159 yards, 2 TD

**Top receivers**

- JAX – Dede Westbrook – 8 receptions, 69 yards
- TEN – A. J. Brown – 4 receptions, 135 yards, TD

This game was notable because the four touchdowns scored by the Titans in the third quarter came in a span of six offensive plays.

==== Week 13: at Indianapolis Colts ====
Week Thirteen: Tennessee Titans at Indianapolis Colts – Game summary

Quarter	1	2	3	4	Total
**Titans**	7	0	10	14	**31**
Colts	7	3	7	0	**17**

at Lucas Oil Stadium, Indianapolis, Indiana

- Date: December 1
- Game time: 1:00 p.m. EST/12:00 p.m. CST
- Game weather: None (retractable roof closed)
- Game attendance: 60,361
- Referee: Carl Cheffers
- TV announcers (CBS): Kevin Harlan, Rich Gannon and Jay Feely
- Recap, Game Book

Game information

**First quarter**

- IND – Jack Doyle 21-yard pass from Jacoby Brissett (Adam Vinatieri kick), 11:03. Colts 7–0. **Drive: 6 plays, 39 yards, 3:48.**
- TEN – Adam Humphries 13-yard pass from Ryan Tannehill (Ryan Succop kick), 5:05. Tied 7–7. **Drive: 11 plays, 75 yards, 5:58.**

**Second quarter**

- IND – Adam Vinatieri 28-yard field goal, 6:07. Colts 10–7. **Drive: 11 plays, 80 yards, 6:20.**

**Third quarter**

- IND – Nyheim Hines 1-yard run (Adam Vinatieri kick), 10:23. Colts 17–7. **Drive: 11 plays, 75 yards, 4:37.**
- TEN – Derrick Henry 13-yard run (Ryan Succop kick), 5:52. Colts 17–14. **Drive: 8 plays, 75 yards, 4:31.**
- TEN – Ryan Succop 31-yard field goal, 4:26. Tied 17–17. **Drive: 4 plays, 2 yards, 1:14.**

**Fourth quarter**

- TEN – Tye Smith 63-yard blocked field goal return (Ryan Succop kick), 5:02. Titans 24–17.
- TEN – Kalif Raymond 40-yard pass from Ryan Tannehill (Ryan Succop kick), 3:02. Titans 31–17. **Drive: 3 plays, 44 yards, 1:39.**

**Top passers**

- TEN – Ryan Tannehill – 17/22, 182 yards, 2 TD
- IND – Jacoby Brissett – 25/40, 319 yards, TD, 2 INT

**Top rushers**

- TEN – Derrick Henry – 26 rushes, 149 yards, TD
- IND – Jordan Wilkins – 11 rushes, 47 yards

**Top receivers**

- TEN – A. J. Brown – 3 receptions, 45 yards
- IND – Zach Pascal – 7 receptions, 109 yards

==== Week 14: at Oakland Raiders ====
Week Fourteen: Tennessee Titans at Oakland Raiders – Game summary

Quarter	1	2	3	4	Total
**Titans**	7	14	7	14	**42**
Raiders	7	14	0	0	**21**

at Ring Central Coliseum, Oakland, California

- Date: December 8
- Game time: 3:25 p.m. CST/1:25 p.m. PST
- Game weather: Cloudy, 59 °F (15 °C)
- Game attendance: 52,760
- Referee: Brad Allen
- TV announcers (CBS): Greg Gumbel, Trent Green and Melanie Collins
- Recap, Game Book

Game information

**First quarter**

- OAK – DeAndre Washington 14-yard run (Daniel Carlson kick), 7:43. Raiders 7–0. **Drive: 3 plays, 24 yards, 1:17.**
- TEN – Derrick Henry 12-yard run (Ryan Succop kick), 3:21. Tied 7–7. **Drive: 8 plays, 74 yards, 4:22.**

**Second quarter**

- TEN – A. J. Brown 91-yard pass from Ryan Tannehill (Ryan Succop kick), 14:04. Titans 14–7. **Drive: 1 plays, 91 yards, 0:12.**
- OAK – Rico Gafford 49-yard pass from Derek Carr (Daniel Carlson kick), 10:43. Tied 14–14. **Drive: 6 plays, 75 yards, 3:21.**
- TEN – A. J. Brown 16-yard pass from Ryan Tannehill (Ryan Succop kick), 6:52. Titans 21–14. **Drive: 8 plays, 77 yards, 3:51.**
- OAK – Foster Moreau 1-yard pass from Derek Carr (Daniel Carlson kick), 0:24. Tied 21–21. **Drive: 14 plays, 71 yards, 6:28.**

**Third quarter**

- TEN – Derrick Henry 10-yard run (Ryan Succop kick), 5:36. Titans 28–21. **Drive: 6 plays, 89 yards, 2:28.**

**Fourth quarter**

- TEN – Jonnu Smith 17-yard pass from Ryan Tannehill (Ryan Succop kick), 14:29. Titans 35–21. **Drive: 9 plays, 84 yards, 3:53.**
- TEN – Jayon Brown 46-yard fumble return (Ryan Succop kick), 13:12. Titans 42–21.

**Top passers**

- TEN – Ryan Tannehill – 21/27, 391 yards, 3 TD, INT
- OAK – Derek Carr – 25/34, 263 yards, 2 TD

**Top rushers**

- TEN – Derrick Henry – 18 rushes, 103 yards, 2 TD
- OAK – DeAndre Washington – 14 rushes, 53 yards, TD

**Top receivers**

- TEN – A. J. Brown – 5 receptions, 153 yards, 2 TD
- OAK – Darren Waller – 6 receptions, 73 yards

In a game with heavy playoff implications, the Titans scored three unanswered touchdowns in the second half after being locked in a 21–21 tie with the Raiders at halftime. Tennessee finished with 551 total yards as Ryan Tannehill passed for nearly 400 yards and Derrick Henry also posted a strong performance. With the win, the Titans improved to 8–5, reaching a tie with the Pittsburgh Steelers for the sixth seed in the AFC.

==== Week 15: vs. Houston Texans ====
Week Fifteen: Houston Texans at Tennessee Titans – Game summary

Quarter	1	2	3	4	Total
**Texans**	0	14	0	10	**24**
Titans	0	0	7	14	**21**

at Nissan Stadium, Nashville, Tennessee

- Date: December 15
- Game time: 12:00 p.m. CST
- Game weather: Cloudy, 45 °F (7 °C)
- Game attendance: 65,265
- Referee: Bill Vinovich
- TV announcers (CBS): Jim Nantz, Tony Romo and Tracy Wolfson
- Recap, Game Book

Game information

**First quarter**

- No scoring plays

**Second quarter**

- HOU – Kenny Stills 12-yard pass from Deshaun Watson (Kaʻimi Fairbairn kick), 9:59. Texans 7–0. **Drive: 2 plays, 12 yards, 0:47.**
- HOU – Kenny Stills 16-yard pass from Deshaun Watson (Kaʻimi Fairbairn kick), 3:14. Texans 14–0. **Drive: 9 plays, 72 yards, 4:35.**

**Third quarter**

- TEN – Ryan Tannehill 1-yard run (Ryan Succop kick), 5:34. Texans 14–7. **Drive: 15 plays, 76 yards, 9:26.**

**Fourth quarter**

- TEN – A. J. Brown 5-yard pass from Ryan Tannehill (Ryan Succop kick), 13:35. Tied 14–14. **Drive: 6 plays, 80 yards, 2:04.**
- HOU – Carlos Hyde 10-yard run (Kaʻimi Fairbairn kick), 10:34. Texans 21–14. **Drive: 7 plays, 75 yards, 3:01.**
- HOU – Kaʻimi Fairbairn 29-yard field goal, 3:26. Texans 24–14. **Drive: 12 plays, 80 yards, 5:20.**
- TEN – Dion Lewis 11-yard pass from Ryan Tannehill (Ryan Succop kick), 2:04. Texans 24–21. **Drive: 7 plays, 75 yards, 1:22.**

**Top passers**

- HOU – Deshaun Watson – 19/27, 243 yards, 2 TD, 2 INT
- TEN – Ryan Tannehill – 22/36, 279 yards, 2 TD, INT

**Top rushers**

- HOU – Carlos Hyde – 26 carries, 104 yards, TD
- TEN – Derrick Henry – 21 carries, 86 yards

**Top receivers**

- HOU – DeAndre Hopkins – 6 receptions, 119 yards
- TEN – A. J. Brown – 8 receptions, 114 yards, TD

==== Week 16: vs. New Orleans Saints ====
Week Sixteen: New Orleans Saints at Tennessee Titans – Game summary

Quarter	1	2	3	4	Total
**Saints**	0	10	21	7	**38**
Titans	14	0	7	7	**28**

at Nissan Stadium, Nashville, Tennessee

- Date: December 22
- Game time: 12:00 p.m. CST
- Game weather: Cloudy, 50 °F (10 °C)
- Game attendance: 66,756
- Referee: Jerome Boger
- TV announcers (Fox): Kenny Albert, Ronde Barber and Sara Walsh
- Recap, Game Book

Game information

**First quarter**

- TEN - Jonnu Smith 41-yard pass from Ryan Tannehill (Greg Joseph kick), 7:55. Titans 7-0. **Drive: 5 plays, 73 yards, 2:42.**
- TEN - A. J. Brown 49-yard run (Greg Joseph kick), 4:50. Titans 14-0. **Drive: 3 plays, 70 yards, 1:11.**

**Second quarter**

- NO - Wil Lutz 47-yard field goal, 13:36. Titans 14-3. **Drive: 13 plays, 41 yards, 6:14.**
- NO - Jared Cook 61-yard pass from Drew Brees (Wil Lutz kick), 2:23. Titans 14-10. **Drive: 1 play, 61 yards, 0:11.**

**Third quarter**

- NO - Alvin Kamara 40-yard run (Wil Lutz kick), 14:00. Saints 17-14. **Drive: 2 plays, 61 yards, 1:00.**
- NO - Alvin Kamara 1-yard run (Wil Lutz kick), 7:08. Saints 24-14. **Drive: 9 plays, 70 yards, 4:00.**
- TEN - Tajae Sharpe 34-yard pass from Ryan Tannehill (Greg Joseph kick), 4:25. Saints 24-21. **Drive: 5 plays, 75 yards, 2:43.**
- NO - Jared Cook 16-yard pass from Drew Brees (Wil Lutz kick), 1:18. Saints 31-21. **Drive: 5 plays, 52 yards, 3:07.**

**Fourth quarter**

- TEN - Tajae Sharpe 7-yard pass from Ryan Tannehill (Greg Joseph kick), 7:27. Saints 31-28. **Drive: 6 plays, 42 yards, 3:15.**
- NO - Michael Thomas 2-yard pass from Drew Brees (Wil Lutz kick), 2:10. Saints 38-28. **Drive: 6 plays, 25 yards, 1:56.**

**Top passers**

- TEN - Ryan Tannehill - 17/27, 272 yards, 3 TD
- NO - Drew Brees - 27/38, 279 yards, 3 TD

**Top rushers**

- TEN - Dion Lewis - 15 rushes, 68 yards
- NO - Alvin Kamara - 11 rushes, 80 yards, 2 TD

**Top receivers**

- TEN - Tajae Sharpe - 5 receptions, 69 yards, 2 TD
- NO - Michael Thomas - 12 receptions, 136 yards, TD

==== Week 17: at Houston Texans ====
Week Seventeen: Tennessee Titans at Houston Texans – Game summary

Quarter	1	2	3	4	Total
**Titans**	7	7	7	14	**35**
Texans	7	0	7	0	**14**

at NRG Stadium, Houston, Texas

- Date: December 29
- Game time: 3:25 p.m. CST
- Game weather: None (retractable roof closed)
- Game attendance: 71,794
- Referee: Clete Blakeman
- TV announcers (CBS): Jim Nantz, Tony Romo and Tracy Wolfson
- Recap, Game Book

Game information

**First quarter**

- HOU – Duke Johnson 1-yard run (Kaʻimi Fairbairn kick), 7:25. Texans 7–0. **Drive: 15 plays, 75 yards, 7:35.**
- TEN – A. J. Brown 51-yard pass from Ryan Tannehill (Greg Joseph kick), 5:33. Tied 7–7. **Drive: 4 plays, 75 yards, 1:52.**

**Second quarter**

- TEN – MyCole Pruitt 1-yard pass from Ryan Tannehill (Greg Joseph kick), 9:42. Titans 14–7. **Drive: 16 plays, 90 yards, 8:04.**

**Third quarter**

- TEN – Derrick Henry 3-yard run (Greg Joseph kick), 10:06. Titans 21–7. **Drive: 10 plays, 78 yards, 4:54.**
- HOU – A. J. McCarron 1-yard run (Kaʻimi Fairbairn kick), 1:09. Titans 21–14. **Drive: 16 plays, 75 yards, 8:57.**

**Fourth quarter**

- TEN – Derrick Henry 1-yard run (Greg Joseph kick), 14:02. Titans 28–14. **Drive: 5 plays, 75 yards, 2:04.**
- TEN – Derrick Henry 53-yard run (Greg Joseph kick), 2:54. Titans 35–14. **Drive: 4 plays, 85 yards, 0:32.**

**Top passers**

- TEN – Ryan Tannehill – 13/20, 198 yards, 2 TD
- HOU – A. J. McCarron – 21/36, 225 yards, INT

**Top rushers**

- TEN – Derrick Henry – 32 rushes, 211 yards, 3 TD
- HOU – Taiwan Jones – 9 rushes, 40 yards

**Top receivers**

- TEN – A. J. Brown – 4 receptions, 124 yards, TD
- HOU – DeAndre Carter – 6 receptions, 65 yards

With this win, the Titans clinched the #6 seed in the AFC. They also won their first game in Houston since 2011.

RB Derrick Henry achieved the most rushing yards in the league, surpassing Browns RB Nick Chubb.

=== Standings ===
==== Division ====
AFC South
	W	L	T	PCT	DIV	CONF	PF	PA	STK
^{(4)} Houston Texans	10	6	0	.625	4–2	8–4	378	385	L1
^{(6)} Tennessee Titans	9	7	0	.563	3–3	7–5	402	331	W1
Indianapolis Colts	7	9	0	.438	3–3	5–7	361	373	L1
Jacksonville Jaguars	6	10	0	.375	2–4	6–6	300	397	W1

==== Conference ====
AFC
#	Team	Division	W	L	T	PCT	DIV	CONF	SOS	SOV	STK
**Division leaders**
1	Baltimore Ravens	North	14	2	0	.875	5–1	10–2	.494	.484	W12
2 (Note: Kansas City claimed the No. 2 seed over New England based on head-to-head victory.)	Kansas City Chiefs	West	12	4	0	.750	6–0	9–3	.510	.477	W6
3	New England Patriots	East	12	4	0	.750	5–1	8–4	.469	.411	L1
4	Houston Texans	South	10	6	0	.625	4–2	8–4	.520	.488	L1
**Wild Cards**
5	Buffalo Bills	East	10	6	0	.625	3–3	7–5	.461	.363	L2
6	Tennessee Titans	South	9	7	0	.563	3–3	7–5	.488	.465	W1
**Did not qualify for the postseason**
7	Pittsburgh Steelers	North	8	8	0	.500	3–3	6–6	.502	.324	L3
8 (Note: Denver finished ahead of Indianapolis and NY Jets based on conference record. Division tiebreak was initially used to eliminate Oakland (see below).) (Note: Denver finished ahead of Oakland based on conference record.)	Denver Broncos	West	7	9	0	.438	3–3	6–6	.510	.406	W2
9 (Note: Oakland and Indianapolis finished ahead of NY Jets based on conference record.) (Note: Oakland finished ahead of Indianapolis based on head-to-head victory.)	Oakland Raiders	West	7	9	0	.438	3–3	5–7	.482	.335	L1
10	Indianapolis Colts	South	7	9	0	.438	3–3	5–7	.492	.500	L1
11	New York Jets	East	7	9	0	.438	2–4	4–8	.473	.402	W2
12 (Note: Jacksonville finished ahead of Cleveland based on record against common opponents. Jacksonville's cumulative record against Cincinnati, Denver, NY Jets, and Tennessee was 4–1, compared to Cleveland's 2–3 cumulative record against the same four teams.)	Jacksonville Jaguars	South	6	10	0	.375	2–4	6–6	.484	.406	W1
13	Cleveland Browns	North	6	10	0	.375	3–3	6–6	.533	.479	L3
14 (Note: LA Chargers finished ahead of Miami based on head-to-head victory.)	Los Angeles Chargers	West	5	11	0	.313	0–6	3–9	.514	.488	L3
15	Miami Dolphins	East	5	11	0	.313	2–4	4–8	.484	.463	W2
16	Cincinnati Bengals	North	2	14	0	.125	1–5	2–10	.553	.406	W1
**Tiebreakers** (Note: When breaking ties for three or more teams under the NFL's rules, they are first broken within divisions, then comparing only the highest ranked remaining team from each division.)

== Postseason ==
=== Schedule ===
Round	Date	Opponent (seed)	Result	Record	Venue	Recap
Wild Card	January 4, 2020	at New England Patriots (3)	W 20–13	1–0	Gillette Stadium	Recap
Divisional	January 11, 2020	at Baltimore Ravens (1)	W 28–12	2–0	M&T Bank Stadium	Recap
AFC Championship	January 19, 2020	at Kansas City Chiefs (2)	L 24–35	2–1	Arrowhead Stadium	Recap

=== Game summaries ===
==== AFC Wild Card Playoffs: at (3) New England Patriots ====
AFC Wild Card Playoffs: (6) Tennessee Titans at (3) New England Patriots – Game summary

Quarter	1	2	3	4	Total
Titans	7	7	0	6	20
Patriots	3	10	0	0	13

at Gillette Stadium, Foxborough, Massachusetts

- Date: January 4, 2020
- Game time: 8:15 p.m. EST/7:15 p.m. CST
- Game weather: Foggy, 44 °F (7 °C)
- Game attendance: 65,878
- Referee: John Hussey
- TV announcers (CBS): Jim Nantz, Tony Romo and Tracy Wolfson
- Recap, Game Book

Game information

First quarter

- NE - Nick Folk 36-yard field goal, 12:37. Patriots 3-0. Drive: 8 plays, 57 yards, 2:23.
- TEN - Anthony Firkser 12-yard pass from Ryan Tannehill (Greg Joseph kick), 5:39. Titans 7-3. Drive: 12 plays, 75 yards, 6:58.

Second quarter

- NE - Julian Edelman 5-yard run (Nick Folk kick), 14:57. Patriots 10-7. Drive: 10 plays, 75 yards, 5:42.
- NE - Nick Folk 21-yard field goal, 2:16. Patriots 13-7. Drive: 10 plays, 44 yards, 5:44.
- TEN - Derrick Henry 1-yard run (Greg Joseph kick), 0:35. Titans 14-13. Drive: 7 plays, 75 yards, 1:41.

Third quarter

- No scoring plays.

Fourth quarter

- TEN - Logan Ryan 9-yard interception return (run failed), 0:09. Titans 20-13.

Top passers

- TEN - Ryan Tannehill - 8/15, 72 yards, TD, INT
- NE - Tom Brady - 20/37, 209 yards, INT

Top rushers

- TEN - Derrick Henry - 34 rushes, 182 yards, TD
- NE - Sony Michel - 14 rushes, 61 yards

Top receivers

- TEN - Anthony Firkser - 2 receptions, 23 yards, TD
- NE - James White - 5 receptions, 62 yards

Tennessee running back Derrick Henry accounted for 204 of the Titans' 272 total offensive yards, including 34 carries for 182 yards and a touchdown as he led his team to victory as the Patriots failed to win a playoff game in a season for the first time since 2010. As a result, New England's streak of AFC Championship appearances ended at eight.

New England took the opening kickoff and drove 57 yards in 8 plays, the longest a 21-yard completion from Tom Brady to tight end Benjamin Watson. Nick Folk finished the drive with a 36-yard field goal to put the Patriots up 3–0. Tennessee struck back, with Henry carrying the ball 6 times for 44 yards on a 75-yard drive, that gave the team a 7–3 lead with Ryan Tannehill's 12-yard touchdown pass to Anthony Firkser, the first playoff touchdown scored by a Harvard University graduate. New England then moved the ball 75 yards in 10 plays, featuring a 25-yard run by Sony Michel. Receiver Julian Edelman finished the drive with a 5-yard touchdown run – his first such touchdown – on an end around play on the first play of the second quarter, giving the Patriots a 10–7 lead. Later on, Patriots receiver Mohamed Sanu returned a punt 23 yards to the Titans' 47-yard line, and the team drove on to a first and goal on the 1-yard line. The Titans held out on the goal line; linebacker Rashaan Evans dropped Michel for a 1-yard loss on first down, Rex Burkhead was tackled on the 1-yard line by Evans and DaQuan Jones on second down and Evans tackled Michel for a 2-yard loss on third down. The Patriots took a 13–7 lead on Folk's 21-yard field goal with 2:16 left in the half. Henry took off for a 29-yard gain on the first play of the team's ensuing drive, before picking up 23 more yards with his next three carries after an incompletion. Henry then ran a screen pass 22 yards to the Patriots' 1-yard line, ultimately converting a 1-yard touchdown run to give the Titans a 14–13 halftime lead.

This would turn out to be the last offensive score of the game, as both teams combined for a total of 9 punts in the second half. New England got a mild scoring chance when Duron Harmon intercepted a pass from Tannehill – who finished with 72 passing yards – at New England's 41-yard line, but the offense could only move the ball to Tennessee's 47-yard line before being forced to punt. In the final minute of the game, Tennessee punter Brett Kern's 58-yard kick pinned the Patriots back at their own 1-yard line. On the next play, Titans defensive back Logan Ryan, who formerly played for New England, intercepted Brady's pass and returned it for a 9-yard touchdown, making the final score 20–13 after a failed two-point conversion attempt. Ryan's pick-six would end up being Brady's final pass as a Patriot, as he would leave the Patriots in the offseason to sign with the Tampa Bay Buccaneers.

==== AFC Divisional Playoffs: at (1) Baltimore Ravens ====
AFC Divisional Playoffs: (6) Tennessee Titans at (1) Baltimore Ravens – Game summary

Quarter	1	2	3	4	Total
Titans	7	7	14	0	28
Ravens	0	6	0	6	12

at M&T Bank Stadium, Baltimore, Maryland

- Date: January 11, 2020
- Game time: 8:15 p.m. EST/7:15 p.m. CST
- Game weather: Cloudy, 69 °F (21 °C)
- Game attendance: 71,254
- Referee: Bill Vinovich
- TV announcers (CBS): Ian Eagle, Dan Fouts, Evan Washburn and Gene Steratore
- Recap, Game Book

Game information

First quarter

- TEN – Jonnu Smith 12-yard pass from Ryan Tannehill (Greg Joseph kick), 3:36. Titans 7–0. Drive: 8 plays, 35 yards, 4:13.

Second quarter

- TEN – Kalif Raymond 45-yard pass from Ryan Tannehill (Greg Joseph kick), 14:45. Titans 14–0. Drive: 1 play, 45 yards, 0:08.
- BAL – Justin Tucker 49-yard field goal, 5:52. Titans 14–3. Drive: 12 plays, 59 yards, 5:21.
- BAL – Justin Tucker 22-yard field goal, 0:00. Titans 14–6. Drive: 14 plays, 91 yards, 2:32.

Third quarter

- TEN – Corey Davis 3-yard pass from Derrick Henry (Greg Joseph kick), 6:54. Titans 21–6. Drive: 6 plays, 81 yards, 3:01.
- TEN – Ryan Tannehill 1-yard run (Greg Joseph kick), 4:16. Titans 28–6. Drive: 6 plays, 20 yards, 2:28.

Fourth quarter

- BAL – Hayden Hurst 15-yard pass from Lamar Jackson (pass failed), 11:04. Titans 28–12. Drive: 10 plays, 88 yards, 3:45.

Top passers

- TEN – Ryan Tannehill – 7/14, 88 yards, 2 TD
- BAL – Lamar Jackson – 31/59, 365 yards, TD, 2 INT

Top rushers

- TEN – Derrick Henry – 30 rushes, 195 yards
- BAL – Lamar Jackson – 20 rushes, 143 yards

Top receivers

- TEN – Kalif Raymond – 1 reception, 45 yards, TD
- BAL – Marquise Brown – 7 receptions, 126 yards

Tennessee stunned the heavily favored Ravens, who had the NFL's best record and had finished the year as the league's top scoring team, while also setting a new record for rushing yards in a season. Once again, Titans running back Derrick Henry accounted for most of the Tennessee offense, accounting for 205 of their 300 total yards. Meanwhile, Baltimore racked up 530 yards, but their three turnovers and four failed fourth-down conversion attempts proved too much to overcome. As a result, Baltimore became the first number 1 seed in the playoffs to lose to the number 6 seed since the New England Patriots lost to the New York Jets in 2010.

On the Ravens' first drive of the game, Lamar Jackson threw a pass that bounced off the hands of Mark Andrews and was intercepted by safety Kevin Byard, who returned it 31 yards, with an unnecessary roughness penalty against Jackson for a horse-collar tackle adding another 15 yards and giving Tennessee a first down on the Ravens' 35-yard line. Henry then carried the ball 4 times for 22 yards on an 8-play drive that ended with Ryan Tannehill's 12-yard touchdown pass to tight end Jonnu Smith, who made a leaping one-handed catch in the back of the end zone. After getting the ball back, Baltimore drove to a 4th-and-1 on their own 45-yard line. Jackson attempted to convert with a quarterback sneak, but he was tackled by linebacker David Long Jr. for no gain on the last play of the first quarter. On the next play, Tannehill gave the team a 14–0 lead with a 45-yard touchdown pass to Kalif Raymond. Following a punt from each team, Jackson completed a 30-yard pass to Marquise Brown and a 16-yard pass to Andrews, setting up Justin Tucker's 49-yard field goal to make the score 14–3. Then after a Titans punt, Jackson completed a 26-yard pass to Seth Roberts, as well as two completions to Brown for gains of 16 yards and 38 yards on a 91-yard drive. Tucker finished it off with a 22-yard field goal as time expired in the half, making the score 14–6 at halftime.

Baltimore took the second half kickoff and drove to a 4th-and-1 on the Titans' 18-yard line. Jackson again tried to convert with a run, but was stopped for no gain by linebacker Harold Landry. Two plays later on 3rd and 1, Henry took a handoff through the middle and ran for a 66-yard gain, to the Ravens' 6-yard line. Then when faced with 3rd and goal from the 3-yard line, Henry took a direct snap out of wildcat formation and threw a jump pass to Corey Davis for a touchdown. This gave Tennessee a 21–6 lead and made Henry the first running back to throw a touchdown pass in the postseason since Allen Rice in the 1987 season. On the first play of the Ravens' next possession, defensive end Jurrell Casey forced a fumble while sacking Jackson, which Jeffery Simmons recovered for Tennessee on the Baltimore 20-yard line. From there, the Titans drove to a 28–6 lead, scoring on a 6-play drive that ended with Tannehill's 1-yard touchdown run. Baltimore responded with a drive to the Titans' 36-yard line, only to lose the ball again with a Jackson pass that was intercepted by safety Kenny Vaccaro. After forcing Tennessee to punt, the Ravens finally managed to score a touchdown, moving the ball 83 yards in 10 plays, the longest a 27-yard run by Jackson. Jackson finished the drive with a 15-yard touchdown pass to tight end Hayden Hurst, but his subsequent two-point conversion pass was incomplete, keeping the score at 28–12. Tennessee's defense then pinned down Baltimore for the rest of the game, forcing a turnover on downs on the Ravens' final two possessions.

Henry finished the game with 30 carries for 195 yards, while also catching two passes for 7 yards and throwing a 3-yard touchdown pass. He became the first player to rush for over 180 yards twice in the same postseason. Tannehill completed 7 of 14 pass attempts for 88 yards, and two touchdowns, while also rushing for 13 yards and a touchdown; Casey had four tackles, two sacks and a forced fumble. Jackson completed 31 of 59 passes for 365 yards and a touchdown, with two interceptions, while also rushing 20 times for 143 yards. This made him the first quarterback to throw for 300 yards and rush for 100 yards in a playoff game. His top receiver was Brown, who caught seven passes for 126 yards. As of 2025, this marks the Titans last playoff win.

==== AFC Championship: at (2) Kansas City Chiefs ====
AFC Championship: (6) Tennessee Titans at (2) Kansas City Chiefs – Game Summary

Quarter	1	2	3	4	Total
Titans	10	7	0	7	24
Chiefs	7	14	0	14	35

at Arrowhead Stadium, Kansas City, Missouri

- Date: January 19, 2020
- Game time: 2:05 p.m. CST
- Game weather: Sunny, 17 °F (−8 °C)
- Game attendance: 73,656
- Referee: Tony Corrente
- TV announcers (CBS): Jim Nantz, Tony Romo, Tracy Wolfson, Jay Feely, and Gene Steratore
- Recap, Game Book

Game information

First quarter

- TEN – Greg Joseph 30-yard field goal, 11:29. Titans 3–0. Drive: 8 plays, 58 yards, 3:31.
- TEN – Derrick Henry 4-yard run (Greg Joseph kick), 5:52. Titans 10–0. Drive: 9 plays, 58 yards, 4:07.
- KC – Tyreek Hill 8-yard pass from Patrick Mahomes (Harrison Butker kick), 0:46. Titans 10–7. Drive: 10 plays, 74 yards, 5:06.

Second quarter

- TEN – Dennis Kelly 1-yard pass from Ryan Tannehill (Greg Joseph kick), 6:39. Titans 17–7. Drive: 15 plays, 75 yards, 9:07.
- KC – Tyreek Hill 20-yard pass from Patrick Mahomes (Harrison Butker kick), 4:03. Titans 17–14. Drive: 5 plays, 63 yards, 2:36.
- KC – Patrick Mahomes 27-yard run (Harrison Butker kick), 0:11. Chiefs 21–17. Drive: 9 plays, 86 yards, 1:40.

Third quarter

- No scoring plays.

Fourth quarter

- KC – Damien Williams 3-yard run (Harrison Butker kick), 14:50. Chiefs 28–17. Drive: 13 plays, 73 yards, 7:08.
- KC – Sammy Watkins 60-yard pass from Patrick Mahomes (Harrison Butker kick), 7:33. Chiefs 35–17. Drive: 7 plays, 88 yards, 4:21.
- TEN – Anthony Firkser 22-yard pass from Ryan Tannehill (Greg Joseph kick), 4:18. Chiefs 35–24. Drive: 8 plays, 80 yards, 3:15.

Top passers

- TEN – Ryan Tannehill – 21/31, 209 yards, 2 TD
- KC – Patrick Mahomes – 23/35, 294 yards, 3 TD

Top rushers

- TEN – Derrick Henry – 19 rushes, 69 yards, TD
- KC – Patrick Mahomes – 8 rushes, 53 yards, TD

Top receivers

- TEN – Corey Davis – 5 receptions, 65 yards
- KC – Sammy Watkins – 7 receptions, 114 yards, TD

This was the first AFC Championship game since 2011 not to feature the New England Patriots. It was also the first AFC Championship game since 2002, and only the third of the 21st century, not to feature Tom Brady, Peyton Manning, or Ben Roethlisberger as a starting quarterback.

For the second week in a row, Kansas City returned from a deficit to defeat a team that had beaten them in the regular season, recovering from an early 10–0 hole to earn their first Super Bowl appearance in 50 years. The Chiefs outgained Tennessee in total yards 404–295 while holding their explosive running back Derrick Henry to just 61 yards from scrimmage, with negative yardage in the second half.

Tennessee took the opening kickoff and converted Ryan Tannehill's 37-yard completion to A. J. Brown into a 30-yard field goal by Greg Joseph. Kansas City went three-and-out on their first drive, and Kalif Raymond returned their punt 9 yards to the TTitan's42-yard line. Tennessee then drove 58 yards in 9 plays, including a 3-yard catch by Adam Humphries on fourth-and-2. On the next play, Tannehill completed a 22-yard pass to Jonnu Smith on the Chiefs 4-yard line. Then Henry took a snap from wildcat formation and ran into the end zone for a 4-yard score, giving Tennessee a 10–0 lead. This time the Chiefs were able to respond, driving 69 yards in 10 plays, the longest a 26-yard completion from Patrick Mahomes to Tyreek Hill. Hill's 8-yard touchdown catch on the last play made the score 10–7 with 51 seconds left in the first quarter.

The Titans struck back with a 15-play, 74-yard drive that took 9:07 off the clock. Tannehill finished the drive with a 1-yard touchdown pass to offensive tackle Dennis Kelly on a tackle-eligible play that put the team back up by 10 points. Mecole Hardman returned the ensuing kickoff 35 yards to his 35-yard line. From there, Kansas City drove 65 yards in 5 plays, the longest a 24-yard completion from Mahomes to Demarcus Robinson. On the last play, Mahomes threw a 20-yard touchdown pass to Hill, cutting their deficit to 17–14. Then after a punt, Mahomes completed 4 passes for 41 yards and rushed for 7 before taking off for a 27-yard touchdown run in which he evaded five Titans players on the way to the end zone. This gave the Chiefs a 21–17 lead with 23 seconds left in the half.

After a pair of punts to start the second half, Kansas City drove 73 yards in 13 plays to go up 28–17 on Damien Williams' 3-yard touchdown run. On their next drive, the Chiefs put the game completely out of reach with Mahomes' 60-yard touchdown pass to Sammy Watkins, giving them a 35–17 lead with 7:44 left on the clock. Tennessee responded by driving 80 yards in 8 plays, including a fake punt in which punter Brett Kern threw a 28-yard pass to Amani Hooker. Tannehill finished the drive with a 22-yard touchdown pass to Anthony Firkser, making the final score 35–24, and sending the Chiefs to the Super Bowl for the first time since 1970.

Mahomes completed 23/35 passes for 294 yards and three touchdowns, while also leading Kansas City in rushing with eight carries for 53 yards and a score. Watkins caught seven passes for 114 yards and a touchdown. Tannehill completed 21/31 passes for 209 yards and two touchdowns, while also rushing for 11 yards. As of 2025, this remains the Titans only appearance in the AFC Championship after 2002.

== Miscellaneous ==
The Titans had the NFL's worst Field Goal kicking unit in 2019, going only 8 for 18 (.444) during the regular season. The 8 field goals made tied the NFL record for fewest in a 16-game season.
