= Derick Roberson =

American football player (born 1995)

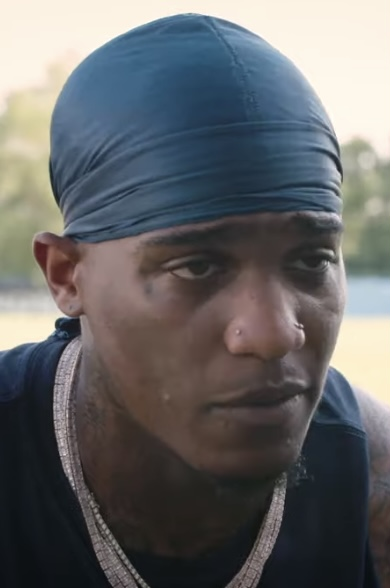
- Roberson in 2021

No. 50 – DC Defenders
- Position: Defensive lineman
- Roster status: Active

Personal information
- Born: November 15, 1995 (age 30); San Antonio, Texas, U.S.
- Listed height: 6 ft 3 in (1.91 m)
- Listed weight: 257 lb (117 kg)

Career information
- High school: William J. Brennan (San Antonio)
- College: Texas (2014–2015); Sam Houston State (2016–2018)
- NFL draft: 2019: undrafted

Career history
- Tennessee Titans (2019–2021); Houston Texans (2022)*; Houston Roughnecks (2023); DC Defenders (2024–2026); Saskatchewan Roughriders (2026); DC Defenders (2027–present)
- * Offseason or practice squad member only

Awards and highlights
- UFL champion (2025); 2× All-UFL Team (2025, 2026)

Career NFL statistics
- Total tackles: 26
- Sacks: 4.5
- Forced fumbles: 1
- Stats at Pro Football Reference

Derick Roberson (born November 15, 1995) is an American professional football defensive lineman for the DC Defenders of the United Football League (UFL). He played college football at Texas and Sam Houston State.

== Professional career ==
Pre-draft measurables
Height	Weight	Arm length	Hand span	Wingspan	40-yard dash	10-yard split	20-yard split	20-yard shuttle	Three-cone drill	Vertical jump	Broad jump	Bench press
6 ft 2 7/8 in (1.90 m)	247 lb (112 kg)	32 7/8 in (0.84 m)	9 7/8 in (0.25 m)	6 ft 6 in (1.98 m)	4.74 s	1.69 s	2.76 s	4.22 s	7.26 s	34.5 in (0.88 m)	9 ft 8 in (2.95 m)	18 reps
All values from Pro Day

=== Tennessee Titans ===
Roberson was signed by the Tennessee Titans as an undrafted free agent on May 9, 2019. He was waived on August 31, 2019, and was signed to the practice squad the next day. Roberson was promoted to the active roster on October 19, 2019, but was waived three days later and re-signed back to the practice squad. He was promoted to the active roster again on November 26, 2019. During a Week 16 38–28 loss to the New Orleans Saints, Roberson recorded his first two career sacks on Drew Brees. In the regular-season finale against the Houston Texans, he recorded three tackles and a sack in the 35–14 road victory.

On September 28, 2021, Roberson was placed on injured reserve on September 28, 2021. He was activated on November 16.

=== Houston Texans ===
On September 8, 2022, Roberson was signed to the Houston Texans practice squad. He was released from the practice squad on November 7.

=== Houston Roughnecks ===
The Houston Roughnecks selected Roberson in the second round of the 2023 XFL Supplemental draft on January 1, 2023. He recorded no stats all season and the Roughnecks lost in the first round of the playoffs. He was released on December 15, 2023.

=== DC Defenders ===
On December 20, 2023, Roberson signed with the DC Defenders of the United Football League (UFL). He played in 9 games in 2024, racking up 32 tackles, 4.5 sacks and 2 forced fumbles.

He re-signed with the team on October 3, 2024. He again played in 9 games during which he posted 27 tackles and 5.5 sacks, helping the Defenders to win the 2025 UFL championship. On June 2, 2025, Roberson was named to the All-UFL Team.

In 2026 he played in 9 games again. He was in the top five in the league for tackles for loss, and tied for third in the league for sacks (7). He helped the Defenders reach the United Bowl again, but the team came up short against Louisville. He was a 2026 UFL MVP finalist and for the 2nd year in a row he was named to the All-UFL Team.

=== Saskatchewan Roughriders ===
In July 2026, it was reported that Roberson had requested a release from the Defenders so that he could sign with the Saskatchewan Roughriders. On July 20, 2026, he was added to Roughriders reserves roster.

=== DC Defenders (second stint) ===
On November 1, 2026, Roberson re-signed with the DC Defenders of the United Football League (UFL).

== NFL statistics ==
=== Regular season ===
Year	Team	Games		Tackles				Interceptions						Fumbles			
Year	Team	GP	GS	Comb	Solo	Ast	Sack	PD	Int	Yds	Avg	Lng	TD	FF	FR	Yds	TD
2019	TEN	3	0	6	5	1	3.0	0	0	0	0.0	0	0	0	0	0	0
2020	TEN	8	1	9	5	4	0.0	1	0	0	0.0	0	0	0	0	0	0
2021	TEN	5	0	11	6	5	1.5	0	0	0	0.0	0	0	0	0	0	0
Career		16	1	26	16	10	4.5	1	0	0	0.0	0	0	0	0	0	0

=== Postseason ===
Year	Team	Games		Tackles				Interceptions						Fumbles			
Year	Team	GP	GS	Comb	Solo	Ast	Sack	PD	Int	Yds	Avg	Lng	TD	FF	FR	Yds	TD
2019	TEN	3	0	1	1	0	0.0	0	0	0	0.0	0	0	0	0	0	0
Career		3	0	1	1	0	0.0	0	0	0	0.0	0	0	0	0	0	0
