= 2018 Pittsburgh Steelers season =

86th season in franchise history, plagued by conflict

- Owner: The Rooney Family
- General manager: Kevin Colbert
- Head coach: Mike Tomlin
- Offensive coordinator: Randy Fichtner
- Defensive coordinator: Keith Butler
- Home stadium: Heinz Field

Results
- Record: 9–6–1
- Division place: 2nd AFC North
- Playoffs: Did not qualify
- All-Pros: 1: Maurkice Pouncey (2nd team)
- Pro Bowlers: 8: RB James Conner; WR Antonio Brown; WR JuJu Smith-Schuster; T Alejandro Villanueva; G David DeCastro; C Maurkice Pouncey; DT Cameron Heyward; OLB T. J. Watt
- Team MVP: JuJu Smith-Schuster
- Team ROY: Terrell Edmunds

Uniform
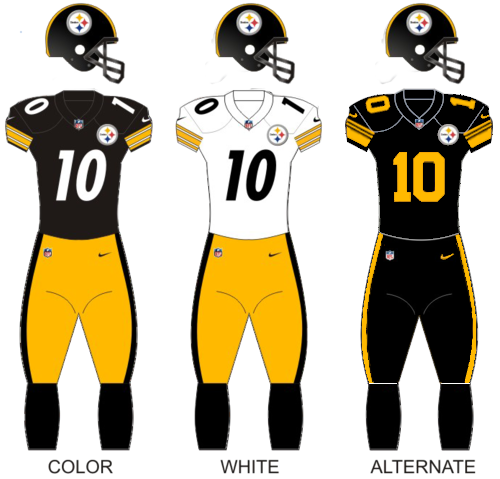

The 2018 season was the Pittsburgh Steelers' 86th as a professional sports franchise and as a member of the National Football League (NFL). It also marked the 19th season under leadership of general manager Kevin Colbert and the 12th under head coach Mike Tomlin. After starting the season 7–2–1, the Steelers lost four of their last six games. The Steelers were eliminated from playoff contention in Week 17 with wins by the Ravens and Colts, clinching the AFC North title for the Ravens, and clinching the last wild card spot for the Colts, missing the playoffs for the first time since 2013.

== Off-the-field events ==
The team was mocked in the media due to conflict amongst team members and staff during both the off-season and the regular season, and for subsequently missing the playoffs after a 7–2–1 start. Star running back Le'Veon Bell refused to sign his franchise tag, holding out for a more permanent contract for what was first expected to be the first few weeks of the season, but later missing out on the entire season. Quarterback Ben Roethlisberger received criticism for openly calling out teammates during public interviews with the media, as well as for his initial reaction to the team drafting quarterback Mason Rudolph.

Most notably, wide receiver Antonio Brown was involved with a string of incidents, ranging from tossing furniture out of his apartment window in the off-season, arguing with offensive coordinator Randy Fichtner, clashing with the media about his role on the offense, and getting cited for speeding in excess of over 100 mph along a suburban highway. These incidents culminated in Brown reportedly getting into a heated argument with Roethlisberger and benched for the final game of the season against the Cincinnati Bengals as a result, then storming out of the team facility and ignoring all contact from teammates, coaches, and the front office. Brown's tipping point was suggested to be the Steelers' decision to name receiver JuJu Smith-Schuster as team MVP leading up to Week 17 which also led up to Brown demanding a trade from the Steelers a few days after the season where he would be eventually traded to the Oakland Raiders at the start of the new NFL year. Brown also openly called out Smith-Schuster via Twitter and Instagram in April 2019 due to his game losing fumble in a Week 16 loss to the New Orleans Saints, which crippled the Steelers playoff chances.

Following the season, fans, commentators, and numerous current and former Steelers lamented the conflict inside the organization, with some blaming the team culture for the late season collapse (which included four close, mistake-filled and penalty-prone losses within the final six games) and head coach Mike Tomlin for his inability to control a drama-filled locker room. The drama during the Steelers' 2018 season was most notably chronicled in satirical fashion by Steve "Schlasser" Linkowski, a Pittsburgh-based YouTube personality, former video game reviewer, and prominent Steelers fan known for his colorful and rant-filled videos poking fun at sports franchises on his channel UrinatingTree. Linkowski dubbed his video series focusing on the off-the-field drama as "Days of our Steelers" as a parody of NBC's soap opera TV show Days of Our Lives. The team blocked UrinatingTree on Twitter by Week 6. The series has continued, albeit more sporadically, during the 2019 and 2020 seasons as a part of his NFL week in review series This Week in Sportsball, and multiple allusions to the series have been made from then on depending on the team's record and playoff situation.

== Transactions ==
The Steelers were involved in the following transactions during the 2018 season:

=== Trades ===
Player	Acquired from	Traded to	Date	Trade terms
WR Martavis Bryant		Oakland Raiders	April 26	2018 3rd round pick
WR Ryan Switzer	Oakland Raiders		August 27	2019 5th round pick to Oakland, 2019 6th round pick to Pittsburgh

=== Free agent signings ===
Player	Acquired from	Lost to	Date	Contract terms
OT Chris Hubbard		Cleveland Browns	March 14	5 years / $37.5 million
ILB Jon Bostic	Indianapolis Colts		March 17	2 years / $4.1 million
SS Morgan Burnett	Green Bay Packers		March 20	3 years / $14.5 million
SS Nat Berhe	New York Giants		April 6	1 year / $880,000

=== Signings ===
Player	Date	Contract terms
SS Jordan Dangerfield	January 15	(Reserve/Future)
ILB Matt Galambos	January 15	(Reserve/Future)
OLB Farrington Huguenin	January 15	(Reserve/Future)
TE Jake McGee	January 15	(Reserve/Future)
CB Dashaun Phillips	January 15	(Reserve/Future)
TE Xavier Grimble	January 15	1-year extension (ERFA)
LS Kameron Canaday	January 15	1-year extension (ERFA)
CB Mike Hilton	January 16	1-year extension (ERFA)
DE Lavon Hooks	January 16	(Reserve/Future)
ILB Keith Kelsey	January 16	(Reserve/Future)
WR Justin Thomas	January 16	(Reserve/Future)
WR Marcus Tucker	January 16	(Reserve/Future)
DE Casey Sayles	January 18	(Reserve/Future)
S Malik Golden	January 19	(Reserve/Future)
LB Darnell Leslie	January 19	(Reserve/Future)
P Matt Wile	January 19	(Reserve/Future)
WR Trey Griffey	January 29	(Reserve/Future)
WR Tevin Jones	January 29	(Reserve/Future)
RB James Summers	January 29	(Reserve/Future)
OL Matt Feiler	January 31	1-year extension (ERFA)
P Jordan Berry	February 1	1-year extension (RFA)
OL B. J. Finney	February 9	1-year extension (ERFA)
FB Roosevelt Nix	February 10	4-year extension (RFA)
RB Le'Veon Bell	March 6	1-year extension (Franchise Tag)
K Chris Boswell	March 12	1-year extension (RFA)
OLB Anthony Chickillo	March 13	1-year extension (RFA)
RB Fitzgerald Toussaint	March 15	1-year extension (RFA)
DT Daniel McCullers	March 22	1-year extension (URFA)
RB Stevan Ridley	April 4	1-year extension (URFA)
WR Justin Hunter	April 5	1-year extension (URFA)
OT Joseph Cheek	April 9	(Reserve/Future)
OT Larson Graham	April 9	(Reserve/Future)
C Parker Collins	April 9	(Reserve/Future)

=== Cuts ===
Position	Player	Date
CB	William Gay	March 14
FS	Mike Mitchell	March 14
S	Robert Golden	March 14
CB	Antonio Crawford	April 12
S	J. J. Wilcox	April 30

== Draft ==
2018 Pittsburgh Steelers Draft
Round	Selection	Player	Position	College	Notes
1	28	Terrell Edmunds	S	Virginia Tech	
2	60	James Washington	WR	Oklahoma State	
3	76	Mason Rudolph	QB	Oklahoma State	From Seattle
3	92	Chukwuma Okorafor	OT	Western Michigan	
5	148	Marcus Allen	S	Penn State	From San Francisco
5	165	Jaylen Samuels	RB	NC State	
7	246	Joshua Frazier	DT	Alabama	

Draft trades

- The Steelers traded their fourth-round selection (128th overall) to San Francisco in exchange for San Francisco's fifth-round selection (148th overall) and tight end Vance McDonald.
- The Steelers traded their sixth-round selection (202nd overall) to Cleveland in exchange for cornerback Justin Gilbert. Cleveland then traded this selection back to Pittsburgh in exchange for a 2019 seventh round selection and WR Sammie Coates. Pittsburgh then traded this selection to Tampa Bay in exchange for Tampa Bay's seventh-round selection in 2019 and free safety J. J. Wilcox.
- The Steelers traded cornerback Ross Cockrell to the New York Giants in exchange for the Giants' seventh-round selection (220th overall)
- The Steelers traded wide receiver Martavis Bryant to the Oakland Raiders in exchange for Oakland's third-round selection previously acquired from the Arizona Cardinals (79th overall). They later traded the 79th selection and their seventh-round selection (220th overall) to the Seattle Seahawks for Seattle's third-round pick (76th overall).

=== Undrafted free agents ===
All undrafted free agents were signed after the 2018 NFL draft concluded on April 28 unless otherwise noted.

= Made Week 1 roster

2018 Pittsburgh Steelers Undrafted Free Agents
Position	Player	College	Notes
LB	Olasunkanmi Adeniyi	Toledo	
DT	Parker Cothren	Penn State	
RB	Jarvion Franklin	Western Michigan	Signed to practice squad
DE	Greg Gilmore	LSU	
WR	Quadree Henderson	Pittsburgh	
CB	Trey Johnson	Villanova	
TE	Pharoah McKever	NC State	
C	Patrick Morris	TCU	Signed to practice squad
OL	Ikenna Nwokeji	Elon	Released May 14
WR	Damoun Patterson	Youngstown State	Signed May 14
OL	R. J. Prince	North Carolina	Signed May 14, Signed to practice squad
G	Chris Schleuger	UAB	
CB	Jamar Summers	UCONN	
LB	Matthew Thomas	Florida State	
DE	Kendal Vickers	Tennessee	

== Staff ==
2018 Pittsburgh Steelers staff
Front office: President – Art Rooney II; Vice president – Art Rooney Jr.; Vice president & general manager – Kevin Colbert; Vice president of football and business administration – Omar Khan; Football administration coordinator – Samir Suleiman; Player personnel coordinator – Dan Rooney Jr.; College scouting coordinator – Phil Kreidler; Pro scouting coordinator – Brandon Hunt; Analytics and football research coordinator – Karim Kassam; Head coaches: Head coach – Mike Tomlin; Assistant head coach – John Mitchell; Offensive coaches: Offensive coordinator/quarterbacks – Randy Fichtner; Running backs – James Saxon; Wide receivers – Darryl Drake; Tight ends – James Daniel; Offensive line – Mike Munchak; Assistant offensive line coach – Shaun Sarrett	Defensive coaches: Defensive coordinator – Keith Butler; Defensive line – Karl Dunbar; Outside linebackers – Joey Porter; Inside linebackers – Jerry Olsavsky; Defensive backs – Tom Bradley; Special teams coaches: Special teams coordinator – Danny Smith; Strength and conditioning: Conditioning coordinator – Garrett Giemont; Conditioning assistant – Marcel Pastoor

== Final roster ==
2018 Pittsburgh Steelers roster
Quarterbacks (QB): 5 Joshua Dobbs; 7 Ben Roethlisberger; 2 Mason Rudolph; Running backs (RB): 30 James Conner; 33 Trey Edmunds; 45 Roosevelt Nix FB; 22 Stevan Ridley; 38 Jaylen Samuels; Wide receivers (WR): 84 Antonio Brown; 88 Darrius Heyward-Bey; 17 Eli Rogers; 19 JuJu Smith-Schuster; 10 Ryan Switzer; 13 James Washington; Tight ends (TE): 85 Xavier Grimble; 81 Jesse James; 89 Vance McDonald	Offensive linemen (OL): 72 Zach Banner T; 66 David DeCastro G; 71 Matt Feiler T; 67 B. J. Finney G/T; 73 Ramon Foster G; 76 Chukwuma Okorafor T; 53 Maurkice Pouncey C; 78 Alejandro Villanueva T; Defensive linemen (DL): 94 Tyson Alualu DE; 79 Javon Hargrave NT; 97 Cameron Heyward DE; 93 Daniel McCullers NT; 91 Stephon Tuitt DE; 96 L. T. Walton DE	Linebackers (LB): 92 Ola Adeniyi OLB; 51 Jon Bostic ILB; 56 Anthony Chickillo OLB; 48 Bud Dupree OLB; 54 L. J. Fort ILB; 44 Tyler Matakevich ILB; 90 T. J. Watt OLB; 98 Vince Williams ILB; Defensive backs (DB): 29 Brian Allen CB; 27 Marcus Allen SS; 42 Morgan Burnett SS; 25 Artie Burns CB; 37 Jordan Dangerfield FS; 21 Sean Davis FS; 34 Terrell Edmunds SS; 23 Joe Haden CB; 28 Mike Hilton CB; 24 Coty Sensabaugh CB; 20 Cameron Sutton CB; Special teams (ST): 4 Jordan Berry P; 57 Kameron Canaday LS; 3 Matt McCrane K	Practice squad: 99 Keion Adams OLB; 15 Trey Griffey WR; 82 Bucky Hodges TE; 95 Lavon Hooks NT; 14 Tevin Jones WR; 62 Patrick Morris C; 64 R. J. Prince G; 49 Christian Scotland-Williamson TE (IPP); 46 Matthew Thomas ILB; 35 Herb Waters CB; 40 Ralph Webb RB; Reserve: 31 Nat Berhe FS (IR); 9 Chris Boswell K (IR); 72 Joseph Cheek T (IR); 77 Marcus Gilbert T (IR); 39 Malik Golden FS (IR); 65 Jerald Hawkins T (IR); 11 Justin Hunter WR (IR); 38 Trey Johnson CB (IR); 55 Keith Kelsey DE (IR); 80 Jake McGee TE (IR); 50 Ryan Shazier ILB (PUP); Rookies in italics 53 active, 11 reserve, 11 practice squad

== Preseason ==
Week	Date	Opponent	Result	Record	Venue	Recap
1	August 9	at Philadelphia Eagles	W 31–14	1–0	Lincoln Financial Field	Recap
2	August 16	at Green Bay Packers	L 34–51	1–1	Lambeau Field	Recap
3	August 25	Tennessee Titans	W 16–6	2–1	Heinz Field	Recap
4	August 30	Carolina Panthers	W 39–24	3–1	Heinz Field	Recap

== Regular season ==
=== Schedule ===
The Steelers' regular season schedule was announced on April 19.

Week	Date	Opponent	Result	Record	Venue	Recap
1	September 9	at **Cleveland Browns**	**T** 21–21 (OT)	0–0–1	FirstEnergy Stadium	Recap
2	September 16	Kansas City Chiefs	**L** 37–42	0–1–1	Heinz Field	Recap
3	September 24	at Tampa Bay Buccaneers	**W** 30–27	1–1–1	Raymond James Stadium	Recap
4	September 30	**Baltimore Ravens**	**L** 14–26	1–2–1	Heinz Field	Recap
5	October 7	Atlanta Falcons	**W** 41–17	2–2–1	Heinz Field	Recap
6	October 14	at **Cincinnati Bengals**	**W** 28–21	3–2–1	Paul Brown Stadium	Recap
7	Bye					
8	October 28	**Cleveland Browns**	**W** 33–18	4–2–1	Heinz Field	Recap
9	November 4	at **Baltimore Ravens**	**W** 23–16	5–2–1	M&T Bank Stadium	Recap
10	November 8	Carolina Panthers	**W** 52–21	6–2–1	Heinz Field	Recap
11	November 18	at Jacksonville Jaguars	**W** 20–16	7–2–1	TIAA Bank Field	Recap
12	November 25	at Denver Broncos	**L** 17–24	7–3–1	Broncos Stadium at Mile High	Recap
13	December 2	Los Angeles Chargers	**L** 30–33	7–4–1	Heinz Field	Recap
14	December 9	at Oakland Raiders	**L** 21–24	7–5–1	Oakland–Alameda County Coliseum	Recap
15	December 16	New England Patriots	**W** 17–10	8–5–1	Heinz Field	Recap
16	December 23	at New Orleans Saints	**L** 28–31	8–6–1	Mercedes-Benz Superdome	Recap
17	December 30	**Cincinnati Bengals**	**W** 16–13	9–6–1	Heinz Field	Recap

Note: Intra-division opponents are in bold text.

=== Game summaries ===
==== Week 1: at Cleveland Browns ====
Week One: Pittsburgh Steelers at Cleveland Browns – Game summary

Quarter	1	2	3	4	OT	Total
Steelers	0	7	14	0	0	**21**
Browns	0	0	7	14	0	**21**

at FirstEnergy Stadium, Cleveland, Ohio

- Date: September 9
- Game time: 1:00 p.m. EDT
- Game weather: 58 °F (14 °C), rain
- Game attendance: 67,431
- Referee: Shawn Smith
- TV announcers (CBS): Greg Gumbel, Trent Green, Bruce Arians and Melanie Collins
- Recap, Gamebook

Game information

**First quarter**

- No scoring plays

**Second quarter**

- PIT – James Conner 4-yard run (Chris Boswell kick), 11:16. Steelers 7–0. **Drive: 10 plays, 88 yards, 5:39.**

**Third quarter**

- CLE – Tyrod Taylor 20-yard run (Zane Gonzalez kick), 10:05. Tied 7–7. **Drive: 10 plays, 86 yards, 4:55.**
- PIT – Antonio Brown 22-yard pass from Ben Roethlisberger (Chris Boswell kick), 8:24. Steelers 14–7. **Drive: 3 plays, 74 yards, 1:41.**
- PIT – James Conner 22-yard run (Chris Boswell kick), 5:29. Steelers 21–7. **Drive: 2 plays, 39 yards, 0:45.**

**Fourth quarter**

- CLE – Carlos Hyde 1-yard run (Zane Gonzalez kick), 7:32. Steelers 21–14. **Drive: 1 play, 1 yard, 0:04.**
- CLE – Josh Gordon 17-yard pass from Tyrod Taylor (Zane Gonzalez kick), 1:58. Tied 21–21. **Drive: 2 plays, 55 yards, 0:12.**

**Overtime**

- No scoring plays

**Top passers**

- PIT – Ben Roethlisberger – 23/41, 335 yards, TD, 3 INT
- CLE – Tyrod Taylor – 15/40, 197 yards, TD, INT

**Top rushers**

- PIT – James Conner – 31 rushes, 135 yards, 2 TD
- CLE – Tyrod Taylor – 8 rushes, 77 yards, TD

**Top receivers**

- PIT – JuJu Smith-Schuster – 5 receptions, 119 yards
- CLE – Jarvis Landry – 7 receptions, 106 yards

The Steelers started their season on the road against the Browns. After a scoreless first quarter, the Steelers struck first in the second when second-year RB James Conner ran for a 4-yard touchdown to make it 7–0 at halftime. After the break, the Browns went to work as Tyrod Taylor ran for a 20-yard touchdown to tie the game up at 7–7. However, the Steelers retook the lead with 2 more touchdowns: Ben Roethlisberger found Antonio Brown on a 22-yard pass followed up by Conner's second touchdown of the day from 22 yards out to make it 14–7 and then 21–7. In the fourth quarter however, it was all Browns when Carlos Hyde ran for a 1-yard touchdown followed by Taylor connecting with Josh Gordon on a 17-yard touchdown to make it 21–14 and then 21–21. In overtime, neither team would score, leading to a tie.

With the tie, the Steelers started their season 0–0–1. It was the first time ever that they played the Browns to a tie game. This would snap their 6-game winning streak over the Browns. Also, the team's winning streak against division rivals was snapped. They also had their first tie game since 2002 against the Atlanta Falcons. Roethlisberger tied his career high of 5 turnovers in a game (3 interceptions, 2 lost fumbles) as the team turned the ball over 6 times including a Conner fumble late in the fourth quarter. Overall, he finished the game with a very poor 60.5 passer rating.

On a positive note, the team's defense was able to get a turnover of their own (1 interception) and sack Taylor 7 times. The Steelers also held him to a passer rating of 51.8.

==== Week 2: vs. Kansas City Chiefs ====
Week Two: Kansas City Chiefs at Pittsburgh Steelers – Game summary

Quarter	1	2	3	4	Total
**Chiefs**	21	0	14	7	**42**
Steelers	0	21	7	9	**37**

at Heinz Field, Pittsburgh, Pennsylvania

- Date: September 16
- Game time: 1:00 pm. EDT
- Game weather: 80 °F (27 °C), partly cloudy
- Game attendance: 63,956
- Referee: Jerome Boger
- TV announcers (CBS): Ian Eagle, Dan Fouts and Evan Washburn
- Recap, Gamebook

Game information

**First quarter**

- KC – Chris Conley 15-yard pass from Patrick Mahomes (Harrison Butker kick), 13:05. Chiefs 7–0. **Drive: 2 plays, 10 yards, 1:03.**
- KC – Travis Kelce 19-yard pass from Patrick Mahomes (Harrison Butker kick), 9:08. Chiefs 14–0. **Drive: 5 plays, 71 yards, 2:32.**
- KC – Kareem Hunt 5-yard pass from Patrick Mahomes (Harrison Butker kick), 2:24. Chiefs 21–0. **Drive: 6 plays, 61 yards, 2:40.**

**Second quarter**

- PIT – Jesse James 26-yard pass from Ben Roethlisberger (Chris Boswell kick), 14:20. Chiefs 21–7. **Drive: 6 plays, 81 yards, 3:04.**
- PIT – JuJu Smith-Schuster 2-yard pass from Ben Roethlisberger (kick failed), 6:27. Chiefs 21–13. **Drive: 11 plays, 85 yards, 5:41.**
- PIT – James Washington 14-yard pass from Ben Roethlisberger (Ben Roethlisberger-James Conner pass), 0:18. Tied 21–21. **Drive: 10 plays, 90 yards, 2:48.**

**Third quarter**

- KC – Travis Kelce 25-yard pass from Patrick Mahomes (Harrison Butker kick), 12:42. Chiefs 28–21. **Drive: 5 plays, 75 yards, 2:18.**
- PIT – James Conner 1-yard run (Chris Boswell kick), 7:12. Tied 28–28. **Drive: 11 plays, 75 yards, 3:57.**
- KC – Demarcus Robinson 3-yard pass from Patrick Mahomes (Harrison Butker kick), 3:15. Chiefs 35–28. **Drive: 7 plays, 75 yards, 3:67.**

**Fourth quarter**

- KC – Tyreek Hill 29-yard pass from Patrick Mahomes (Harrison Butker kick), 13:42. Chiefs 42–28. **Drive: 5 plays, 65 yards, 3:04.**
- PIT – Kareem Hunt tackled in end zone by Artie Burns and Morgan Burnett, 12:02. Chiefs 42–30.
- PIT – Ben Roethlisberger 1-yard run (Chris Boswell kick), 1:59. Chiefs 42–37. **Drive: 9 plays, 66 yards, 3:04.**

**Top passers**

- KC – Patrick Mahomes – 23/28, 326 yards, 6 TD
- PIT – Ben Roethlisberger – 39/60, 452 yards, 3 TD

**Top rushers**

- KC – Kareem Hunt – 18 carries, 75 yards
- PIT – James Conner – 8 carries, 17 yards, 1 TD

**Top receivers**

- KC – Travis Kelce – 7 receptions, 109 yards, 2 TD
- PIT – JuJu Smith-Schuster – 13 receptions, 121 yards, 1 TD

The Steelers had their home opener against the Chiefs. In the first quarter, it was all Chiefs when Patrick Mahomes threw 3 touchdowns: a 15-yard pass to Chris Conley, a 19-yard pass to Travis Kelce, and a 5-yard pass to Kareem Hunt to make the score 7–0, 14–0, and then 21–0. In the second quarter, the Steelers responded with 3 touchdowns of their own to tie the game up when Ben Roethlisberger connected with Jesse James on a 26-yard pass, followed up with him connecting with JuJu Smith-Schuster on a 2-yard pass (with a failed PAT), and then connecting with James Washington on a 14-yard pass (with a successful 2-point conversion pass to James Conner) to make it 21–7, 21–13, and then 21–21 at halftime. In the third quarter, the Chiefs moved back into the lead when Mahomes found Kelce again on a 25-yard pass to make it 28–21. The Steelers would tie it up when James Conner ran for a 1-yard touchdown to make it 28–28. The Chiefs would pull away again as Mahomes connected with Demarcus Robinson on a 3-yard pass to make it 35–28. In the fourth quarter, the Chiefs moved ahead by double digits as Mahomes found Tyreek Hill on a 29-yard pass to make it 42–28. The Steelers scored twice to come within 5: first when Hunt was tackled by Artie Burns and Morgan Burnett in the end zone for a safety followed by Roethlisberger's 3-yard run for a touchdown to make it 42–30 and then 42–37. With seconds left, the defense was able to get the stop and was about to get their offense back on the field for likely one final play. But a flag for roughing the kicker kept the Chiefs' offense on the field, which sealed the game.

With the loss, the Steelers dropped to 0–1–1. With the Browns' loss to the Saints, both teams remain tied for third place in the AFC North. Even with Ben Roethlisberger posting a 104.3 passer rating, he could not succeed at helping the Steelers win.

Roethlisberger's record against the Chiefs would drop to 6–2. He passed John Elway for seventh-most passing yards in NFL history.

During the game, WR Antonio Brown was caught on camera arguing with offensive coordinator Randy Fichtner for not getting enough playing time during the game. This was only the start of a turmoil-filled season for the Steelers.

==== Week 3: at Tampa Bay Buccaneers ====
Week Three: Pittsburgh Steelers at Tampa Bay Buccaneers – Game summary

Quarter	1	2	3	4	Total
**Steelers**	6	24	0	0	**30**
Buccaneers	7	3	3	14	**27**

at Raymond James Stadium, Tampa, Florida

- Date: September 24
- Game time: 8:20 pm. EDT
- Game weather: 77 °F (25 °C), cloudy
- Game attendance: 62,571
- Referee: Pete Morelli
- TV announcers (ESPN/WTAE): Joe Tessitore, Jason Witten, Booger McFarland and Lisa Salters
- Recap, Gamebook

Game information

**First quarter**

- TB – Cameron Brate – 4-yard TD pass from Ryan Fitzpatrick, 7:21. (Chandler Catanzaro kick). Buccaneers 7–0. **Drive: 5 plays, 53 yards, 2:34.**
- PIT – Vance McDonald – 75-yard TD pass from Ben Roethlisberger, 5:48. Buccaneers 7–6. **Drive: 3 plays, 75 yards, 1:33.**

**Second quarter**

- PIT – Chris Boswell – 38-yard field goal, 12:14. Steelers 9–7. **Drive: 9 plays, 72 yards, 4:45.**
- PIT – Antonio Brown – 27-yard TD pass from Ben Roethlisberger, 10:33. (Chris Boswell kick). Steelers 16–7. **Drive: 2 plays, 33 yards, 0:47.**
- PIT – Bud Dupree – 10-yard INT return, 2:50. Steelers 23–7. **Drive: 2 plays, 0 yards, 0:47.**
- TB – Chandler Catanzaro – 21-yard field goal, 1:15. Steelers 23–10. **Drive: 6 plays, 75 yards, 1:35.**
- PIT – Ryan Switzer – 1 yard TD pass from Ben Roethlisberger, 0:06. Steelers 30–10. **Drive: 9 plays, 75 yards, 1:09.**

**Third quarter**

- TB – Chandler Catanzaro – 28-yard field goal, 7:07. Steelers 30–13. **Drive: 14 plays, 65 yards, 7:53.**

**Fourth quarter**

- TB – Chris Godwin – 4-yard TD pass from Ryan Fitzpatrick (Chandler Catanzaro kick), 11:06. Steelers 30–20. **Drive: 12 plays, 63 yards, 5:00.**
- TB – Mike Evans – 24-yard TD pass from Ryan Fitzpatrick (Chandler Catanzaro kick), 5:43. Steelers 30–27. **Drive: 9 plays, 92 yards, 2:57.**

**Top passers**

- PIT – Ben Roethlisberger – 30/38, 353 yards, 3 TD, 1 INT
- TB – Ryan Fitzpatrick – 30/50, 411 yards, 3 TD, 3 INT

**Top rushers**

- PIT – James Conner – 15 carries, 33 yards
- TB – Peyton Barber – 8 carries, 33 yards

**Top receivers**

- PIT – JuJu Smith-Schuster – 9 receptions, 116 yards
- TB – Mike Evans – 6 receptions, 137 yards, 1 TD

After a tough loss at home, the Steelers traveled to Tampa Bay to take on the Buccaneers. The Bucs scored first when Cameron Brate caught a 4-yard pass from Ryan Fitzpatrick to make it 7–0. The Steelers would answer when Ben Roethlisberger found Vance McDonald on a 75-yard pass to make it 7–6. The Steelers continued to score heading into the second quarter: they took the lead with Chris Boswell's 38-yard field goal to make it 9–7. This would be followed up by Roethlisberger finding Antonio Brown on a 27-yard pass to make it 16–7, and then Bud Dupree intercepted Fitzpatrick to return it 10 yards for a touchdown to make it 23–7. The Bucs came closer when Chandler Catanzaro kicked a 21-yard field goal to make it 23–10. The Steelers wrapped up the first half scoring when Roethlisberger found Ryan Switzer on a 1-yard pass to make it 30–10. In the second half, it was all Bucs as they would outscore the Steelers 17–0 heading into the fourth quarter when Catanzaro kicked a 28-yard field goal to make it 30–13 in the third. In the fourth, the Bucs ended up coming within 3 when Fitzpatrick threw 4-yard and 24-yard passes to Chris Godwin and Mike Evans to make it 30–20 and then 30–27. The Steelers' defense held them off at the last moment to win the game, sealing the win.

With the win, the Steelers improved to 1–1–1. This would be the team's first 1–1–1 start since 1974.

The defense which had earned 2 turnovers in their first 2 games earned 4 turnovers in this game alone (3 interceptions, 1 recovered fumble).

Ben Roethlisberger finished the game with a 120.7 passer rating. This was his second consecutive game posting a passer rating in the hundreds.

==== Week 4: vs. Baltimore Ravens ====
Week Four: Baltimore Ravens at Pittsburgh Steelers – Game summary

Quarter	1	2	3	4	Total
**Ravens**	14	0	3	9	**26**
Steelers	0	14	0	0	**14**

at Heinz Field, Pittsburgh, Pennsylvania

- Date: September 30
- Game time: 8:20 pm. EDT
- Game weather: 69 °F (21 °C), clear
- Game attendance: 62,030
- Referee: Tony Corrente
- TV announcers (NBC): Al Michaels, Cris Collinsworth, Michele Tafoya and Terry McAulay
- Recap, Gamebook

Game information

**First quarter**

- BAL – John Brown – 33-yard TD pass from Joe Flacco. (Justin Tucker kick), 10:45. Ravens 7–0. **Drive: 8 plays, 75 yards, 4:15.**
- BAL – Alex Collins – 3-yard TD pass from Joe Flacco. (Justin Tucker kick), 8:03. Ravens 14–0. **Drive: 4 plays, 31 yards, 1:56.**

**Second quarter**

- PIT – Chris Boswell – 34-yard field goal, 14:07. Ravens 14–3. **Drive: 12 plays, 69 yards, 5:26.**
- PIT – Chris Boswell – 39-yard field goal, 6:26. Ravens 14–6. **Drive: 14 plays, 79 yards, 6:13.**
- PIT – Antonio Brown – 26-yard TD pass from Ben Roethlisberger, 2:50. (Ben Roethlisberger pass to James Conner for two-point conversion). Tied 14–14. **Drive: 5 plays, 76 yards, 1:58.**

**Third quarter**

- BAL – Justin Tucker – 47-yard field goal, 2:50. Ravens 17–14. **Drive: 12 plays, 51 yards, 3:26.**

**Fourth quarter**

- BAL – Justin Tucker – 49-yard field goal, 11:52. Ravens 20–14. **Drive: 11 plays, 37 yards, 6:15.**
- BAL – Justin Tucker – 28-yard field goal, 3:37. Ravens 23–14. **Drive: 14 plays, 82 yards, 6:40.**
- BAL – Justin Tucker – 31-yard field goal, 1:56. Ravens 26–14. **Drive: 5 plays, 14 yards, 1:19.**

**Top passers**

- BAL – Joe Flacco – 28/42, 363 yards, 2 TD
- PIT – Ben Roethlisberger – 27/47, 274 yards, TD, INT

**Top rushers**

- BAL – Alex Collins – 11 carries, 42 yards
- PIT – James Conner – 9 carries, 19 yards

**Top receivers**

- BAL – John Brown – 3 receptions, 116 yards, TD
- PIT – Antonio Brown – 5 receptions, 62 yards, TD

After winning in prime time on the road, the Steelers returned home for a prime time game against their arch-rival, the Ravens. In the first quarter, it was all Ravens when Joe Flacco threw 2 touchdowns: a 33-yard pass to John Brown followed up by a 3-yard pass to Alex Collins to make it 7–0 and then 14–0. In the second quarter, the Steelers responded as Chris Boswell nailed field goals from 34 and 39 yards out to make it 14–3 and then 14–6. This would be followed by Ben Roethlisberger finding Antonio Brown on a 26-yard pass (with a successful 2-point conversion) to tie the game up at 14–14 going into halftime. In the second half, Justin Tucker kicked a 47-yard field goal in the third quarter to make it 17–14 for the Ravens. He would kick 3 more in the fourth to seal the game from 49, 28, and 31 yards out to make it 20–14, 23–14, and the final score 26–14.

With the loss, the Steelers fell to 1–2–1. Also, their 3-game winning streak against the Ravens was snapped.

==== Week 5: vs. Atlanta Falcons ====
Week Five: Atlanta Falcons at Pittsburgh Steelers – Game summary

Quarter	1	2	3	4	Total
Falcons	0	10	0	7	**17**
**Steelers**	13	0	14	14	**41**

at Heinz Field, Pittsburgh, Pennsylvania

- Date: October 7
- Game time: 1:00 pm. EDT
- Game weather: 83 °F (28 °C), sunny
- Game attendance: 64,781
- Referee: John Parry
- TV announcers (Fox): Chris Myers, Daryl Johnston and Laura Okmin
- Recap, Gamebook

Game information

**First quarter**

- PIT – James Conner 1-yard run (kick failed), 10:44. Steelers 6–0. **Drive: 8 plays, 78 yards, 4:16.**
- PIT – JuJu Smith-Schuster 18-yard pass from Ben Roethlisberger (Chris Boswell kick), 0:37. Steelers 13–0. **Drive: 11 plays, 97 yards, 4:38.**

**Second quarter**

- ATL – Mohamed Sanu 43-yard pass from Matt Ryan (Matt Bryant kick), 11:21. Steelers 13–7. **Drive: 8 plays, 75 yards, 4:16.**
- ATL – Matt Bryant 47-yard field goal, 4:23. Steelers 13–10. **Drive: 13 plays, 50 yards, 5:56.**

**Third quarter**

- PIT – Antonio Brown 9-yard pass from Ben Roethlisberger (Chris Boswell kick), 3:42. Steelers 20–10. **Drive: 12 plays, 85 yards, 7:06.**
- PIT – James Conner 2-yard run (Chris Boswell kick), 1:39. Steelers 27–10. **Drive: 3 plays, 18 yards, 0:58.**

**Fourth quarter**

- ATL – Ito Smith 2-yard run (Matt Bryant kick), 12:28. Steelers 27–17. **Drive: 9 plays, 75 yards, 4:11.**
- PIT – Antonio Brown 47-yard pass from Ben Roethlisberger (Chris Boswell kick), 9:41. Steelers 34–17. **Drive: 5 plays, 75 yards, 2:47.**
- PIT – L. J. Fort fumble recovery in end zone (Chris Boswell kick), 3:35. Steelers 41–17.

**Top passers**

- ATL – Matt Ryan – 26/38, 285 yards, 1 TD
- PIT – Ben Roethlisberger – 19/29, 250 yards, 3 TD, 1 INT

**Top rushers**

- ATL – Devonta Freeman – 8 carries, 32 yards
- PIT – James Conner – 21 carries, 110 yards, 2 TD

**Top receivers**

- ATL – Austin Hooper – 9 receptions, 77 yards
- PIT – Antonio Brown – 6 receptions, 101 yards, 2 TD

After a tough loss, the Steelers stayed at home for a duel against the Falcons. In the first quarter, it was all Steelers as James Conner ran for a 1-yard touchdown (with a failed PAT) to make it 6–0. Ben Roethlisberger then connected with JuJu Smith-Schuster on an 18-yard pass to make it 13–0. In the second quarter, the Falcons responded when Matt Ryan found Mohamed Sanu on a 43-yard pass to make it 13–7. This would be followed by Matt Bryant kicking a 47-yard field goal to make it 13–10 at halftime. In the third quarter, Roethlisberger found Antonio Brown on a 9-yard pass to make it 20–10. This would be followed up by Conner running for a 2-yard touchdown to make it 27–10. In the fourth quarter, the Falcons drew closer when Ito Smith ran for a 2-yard touchdown to make it 27–17. However, the Steelers sealed the game with 2 more touchdowns: Roethlisberger found Brown on a 47-yard pass to make it 34–17 followed by L. J. Fort recovering a fumble in the end zone to make the final score 41–17.

With the win, the Steelers improved to 2–2–1.

After being outscored 29–0 in the second half of their previous 2 games, the Steelers outscored the Falcons 28–7 in the second half. Ben Roethlisberger finished the game with a passer rating of 112.7. It was his third passer rating of at least 104.3 in 4 games.

With the win, the Steelers won their 100th regular season game at Heinz Field since its opening in 2001 with a record of 100–38–1 at that point.

==== Week 6: at Cincinnati Bengals ====
Week Six: Pittsburgh Steelers at Cincinnati Bengals – Game summary

Quarter	1	2	3	4	Total
**Steelers**	0	14	3	11	**28**
Bengals	7	7	0	7	**21**

at Paul Brown Stadium, Cincinnati, Ohio

- Date: October 14
- Game time: 1:00 pm. EDT
- Game weather: 51 °F (11 °C), mostly cloudy
- Game attendance: 60,594
- Referee: Clete Blakeman
- TV announcers (CBS): Ian Eagle, Dan Fouts and Evan Washburn
- Recap, Gamebook

Game information

**First quarter**

- CIN – Tyler Boyd – 2-yard pass from Andy Dalton. (Randy Bullock kick), 4:36. Bengals 7–0. **Drive: 11 plays, 54 yards, 4:24.**

**Second quarter**

- PIT – James Conner 1-yard run (Chris Boswell kick), 14:33. Tied 7–7. **Drive: 10 plays, 75 yards, 5:03.**
- PIT – James Conner 1-yard run (Chris Boswell kick), 1:07. Steelers 14–7. **Drive: 8 plays, 75 yards, 4:18.**
- CIN – Tyler Boyd 14-yard pass from Andy Dalton. (Randy Bullock kick), 0:19. Tied 14–14. **Drive: 5 plays, 44 yards, 0:48.**

**Third quarter**

- PIT – Chris Boswell 21-yard field goal, 6:53. Steelers 17–14. **Drive: 12 plays, 85 yards, 6:21.**

**Fourth quarter**

- PIT – Chris Boswell 24-yard field goal, 3:32. Steelers 20–14. **Drive: 10 plays, 82 yards, 5:47.**
- CIN – Joe Mixon 4-yard run (Randy Bullock kick), 1:18. Bengals 21–20. **Drive: 9 plays, 75 yards, 2:14.**
- PIT – Antonio Brown 31-yard pass from Ben Roethlisberger (Ben Roethlisberger pass to JuJu Smith-Schuster for two-point conversion), 0:10. Steelers 28–21. **Drive: 7 plays, 77 yards, 1:08.**

**Top passers**

- PIT – Ben Roethlisberger – 32/46, 369 yards, 1 TD
- CIN – Andy Dalton – 26/42, 229 yards, 2 TD

**Top rushers**

- PIT – James Conner – 19 carries, 111 yards, 2 TD
- CIN – Joe Mixon – 11 carries, 64 yards, 1 TD

**Top receivers**

- PIT – JuJu Smith-Schuster – 7 receptions, 111 yards
- CIN – A. J. Green – 7 receptions, 85 yards

After a huge win at home, the Steelers traveled to Cincinnati for Game 1 against the Bengals. The Bengals scored first when Andy Dalton found Tyler Boyd on a 2-yard pass to make it 7–0 for the only points of the first quarter. In the second quarter, the Steelers took the lead when James Conner ran for 2 1-yard touchdowns to make it 7–7 and then 14–7. The Bengals managed to tie the game up at halftime when Dalton found Boyd on a 14-yard pass to make it 14–14. In the third quarter, the Steelers scored when Chris Boswell kicked a 21-yard field goal to make it 17–14. They would increase their lead in the fourth quarter when Boswell kicked another one from 24 yards out to make it 20–14. However, the Bengals would take the lead when Joe Mixon ran for a 4-yard touchdown to make it 21–20. The Steelers completed the comeback when Ben Roethlisberger found Antonio Brown on a 31-yard pass (with a successful 2-point conversion) to make the final score 28–21. With just :10 on the game clock, Dalton tried for the eventual home run ball. Though, the pass fell incomplete ending the game and giving the Steelers the win.

With the win and their 7th straight victory against the Bengals, the Steelers go into their bye week 3–2–1. The team was also able to snap being tied with the Browns as they would move into first place in the AFC North.

Ben Roethlisberger posted a passer rating of 100.7, his fourth passer rating of at least 100 in 5 games.

==== Week 8: vs. Cleveland Browns ====
Week Eight: Cleveland Browns at Pittsburgh Steelers – Game summary

Quarter	1	2	3	4	Total
Browns	6	0	6	6	**18**
**Steelers**	0	14	9	10	**33**

at Heinz Field, Pittsburgh, Pennsylvania

- Date: October 28
- Game time: 1:00 pm. EDT
- Game weather: 47 °F (8 °C), cloudy
- Game attendance: 63,780
- Referee: Carl Cheffers
- TV announcers (CBS): Ian Eagle, Dan Fouts and Evan Washburn
- Recap, Gamebook

Game information

**First quarter**

- CLE – Greg Joseph 34-yard field goal, 9:15. Browns 3–0. **Drive: 11 plays, 66 yards, 5:50.**
- CLE – Greg Joseph 45-yard field goal, 2:38. Browns 6–0. **Drive: 6 plays, 29 yards, 2:20.**

**Second quarter**

- PIT – Antonio Brown 43-yard pass from Ben Roethlisberger (Chris Boswell kick), 11:35. Steelers 7–6. **Drive: 6 plays, 69 yards, 2:03.**
- PIT – Antonio Brown 1-yard pass from Ben Roethlisberger (Chris Boswell kick), 0:10. Steelers 14–6. **Drive: 16 plays, 87 yards, 7:12.**

**Third quarter**

- PIT – Penalty on Desmond Harrison assessed in CLE end zone for a safety, 8:13. Steelers 16–6.
- CLE – Antonio Callaway 1-yard pass from Baker Mayfield (kick failed), 5:29. Steelers 16–12. **Drive: 4 plays, 24 yards, 2:43.**
- PIT – James Conner 12-yard run (Chris Boswell kick), 2:49. Steelers 23–12. **Drive: 5 plays, 75 yards, 2:42.**

**Fourth quarter**

- PIT – Chris Boswell 42-yard field goal, 13:33. Steelers 26–12. **Drive: 7 plays, 31 yards, 2:46.**
- PIT – James Conner 22-yard run (Chris Boswell kick), 2:10. Steelers 33–12. **Drive: 10 plays, 65 yards, 5:37.**
- CLE – Seth DeValve 24-yard pass from Baker Mayfield (pass failed), 0:13. Steelers 33–18. **Drive: 9 plays, 75 yards, 1:58.**

**Top passers**

- CLE – Baker Mayfield – 22/36, 180 yards, 2 TD, INT
- PIT – Ben Roethlisberger – 24/36, 257 yards, 2 TD, INT

**Top rushers**

- CLE – Nick Chubb – 18 rushes, 65 yards
- PIT – James Conner – 24 rushes, 146 yards, 2 TD

**Top receivers**

- CLE – Jarvis Landry – 8 receptions, 39 yards
- PIT – Antonio Brown – 6 receptions, 74 yards, 2 TD

After coming off the bye week, the Steelers returned home for their second game against the Browns. In the first quarter, the Browns would score 2 field goals as Greg Joseph kicked them from 34 and 45 yards out to make it 3–0 and then 6–0. In the second quarter, the Steelers took the lead when Ben Roethlisberger found Antonio Brown on 2 touchdown passes: from 43 and 1 yard to make it 7–6 and then 14–6 by halftime. In the third quarter, the Steelers increased their lead as a holding penalty in the end zone on Browns offensive tackle Desmond Harrison led to a safety, making the score 16–6. The Browns came within 4 when Baker Mayfield found Antonio Callaway on a 1-yard pass (with a failed PAT) to make it 16–12. The Steelers responded with James Conner's 12-yard touchdown run to make it 23–12. In the fourth, the Steelers increased their lead when Chris Boswell kicked a 42-yard field goal to make it 26–12. This would be followed by Conner's second touchdown run from 22 yards out to make the score 33–12. The Browns scored on their last offensive play of the game as Mayfield found Seth DeValve on a 24-yard pass (with a failed 2-point conversion) to make the final score 33–18.

With the win, the Steelers improved to 4–2–1 and maintained their lead in the AFC North. This also marked the Steelers' fifteenth consecutive win over the Browns in Pittsburgh. This was Hue Jackson's final game as the Browns head coach as he would be fired the next day. Overall, Ben Roethlisberger finished the game with a passer rating of 94.3.

A day prior to this game, eleven people were killed when a mass shooting occurred in the Squirrel Hill section of Pittsburgh. A moment of silence was observed for the victims prior to the game's kickoff. Two days later members of the Steelers attended the memorial services of Cecil and David Rosenthal sister of former community relations manager Michelle Rosenthal.

==== Week 9: at Baltimore Ravens ====
Week Nine: Pittsburgh Steelers at Baltimore Ravens – Game summary

Quarter	1	2	3	4	Total
**Steelers**	7	7	6	3	**23**
Ravens	3	3	7	3	**16**

at M&T Bank Stadium, Baltimore, Maryland

- Date: November 4
- Game time: 1:00 pm. EST
- Game weather: 55 °F (13 °C), sunny, windy
- Game attendance: 70,997
- Referee: Craig Wrolstad
- TV announcers (CBS): Ian Eagle, Dan Fouts and Evan Washburn
- Recap, Gamebook

Game information

**First quarter**

- BAL – Justin Tucker 23-yard field goal, 5:02. Ravens 3–0. **Drive: 10 plays, 66 yards, 4:20.**
- PIT – James Conner 7-yard pass from Ben Roethlisberger (Chris Boswell kick), 1:03. Steelers 7–3. **Drive: 9 plays, 61 yards, 3:59.**

**Second quarter**

- PIT – Antonio Brown 6-yard pass from Ben Roethlisberger (Chris Boswell kick), 7:18. Steelers 14–3. **Drive: 12 plays, 75 yards, 5:46.**
- BAL – Justin Tucker 23-yard field goal, 4:37. Steelers 14–6. **Drive: 6 plays, 58 yards, 2:41.**

**Third quarter**

- PIT – Ben Roethlisberger 1-yard run (kick failed), 6:46. Steelers 20–6. **Drive: 15 plays, 75 yards, 8:14.**
- BAL – Alex Collins 1-yard run (Justin Tucker kick), 2:56. Steelers 20–13. **Drive: 11 plays, 75 yards, 3:50.**

**Fourth quarter**

- PIT – Chris Boswell 29-yard field goal, 8:26. Steelers 23–13. **Drive: 11 plays, 74 yards, 5:49.**
- BAL – Justin Tucker 37-yard field goal, 5:23. Steelers 23–16. **Drive: 9 plays, 56 yards, 3:03.**

**Top passers**

- PIT – Ben Roethlisberger – 28/47, 270 yards, 2 TD
- BAL – Joe Flacco – 23/37, 209 yards

**Top rushers**

- PIT – James Conner – 24 carries, 107 yards
- BAL – Alex Collins – 9 carries, 35 yards, 1 TD

**Top receivers**

- PIT – JuJu Smith-Schuster – 7 receptions, 78 yards
- BAL – Willie Snead IV – 7 receptions, 58 yards

After winning over the Browns at home, the Steelers traveled to Baltimore for their second game against the Ravens. The Ravens scored first when Justin Tucker kicked a 23-yard field goal to make it 3–0. The Steelers however took the lead when Ben Roethlisberger found James Conner on a 7-yard pass to make it 7–3. In the second quarter, the Steelers went up by double digits as Ben Roethlisberger found Antonio Brown on a 6-yard pass to make it 14–3. The Ravens closed the scoring of the first half with Tucker's second field goal from 23 yards out to make it 14–6 at halftime. In the third quarter, the Steelers went back to work as Roethlisberger ran for a touchdown (with a failed PAT) from a yard out to make it 20–6. The Ravens scored one of their own when Alex Collins made it into the end zone with a 1-yard touchdown to make it 20–13. The Steelers pulled away in the fourth quarter as Chris Boswell kicked a 29-yard field goal to make it 23–13. Tucker then kicked a 37-yard field goal to get the Ravens closer and to make it 23–16. Both teams' defenses showed up late, and Roethlisberger was sacked at the Steelers' 41-yard line. However, trapped in their own territory, the Ravens failed to convert a 4th and long, sealing the win for the Steelers with the final score 23–16.

With the win, the Steelers improved to 5–2–1 and maintained their lead in the AFC North. Overall, Ben Roethlisberger posted a passer rating of 89.9,

==== Week 10: vs. Carolina Panthers ====
Week Ten: Carolina Panthers at Pittsburgh Steelers – Game summary

Quarter	1	2	3	4	Total
Panthers	7	7	0	7	**21**
**Steelers**	21	10	14	7	**52**

at Heinz Field, Pittsburgh, Pennsylvania

- Date: November 8
- Game time: 8:20 pm. EST
- Game weather: 40 °F (4 °C), clear
- Game attendance: 62,881
- Referee: Walt Coleman
- TV announcers (Fox/NFLN): Joe Buck, Troy Aikman, Erin Andrews and Kristina Pink
- Recap, Gamebook

Game information

**First quarter**

- CAR – Christian McCaffrey 20-yard pass from Cam Newton (Graham Gano kick), 10:29. Panthers 7–0. **Drive: 9 plays, 75 yards, 4:31.**
- PIT – JuJu Smith-Schuster 75-yard pass from Ben Roethlisberger (Chris Boswell kick), 10:18. Tied 7–7. **Drive: 1 plays, 75 yards, 0:11.**
- PIT – Vince Williams 17-yard interception return (Chris Boswell kick), 10:05. Steelers 14–7.
- PIT – James Conner 2-yard run (Chris Boswell kick), 4:35. Steelers 21–7. **Drive: 8 plays, 61 yards, 4:21.**

**Second quarter**

- PIT – Chris Boswell 50-yard field goal, 9:49. Steelers 24–7. **Drive: 9 plays, 60 yards, 5:01.**
- CAR – Christian McCaffrey 25-yard pass from Cam Newton (Graham Gano kick), 5:04. Steelers 24–14. **Drive: 9 plays, 73 yards, 4:42.**
- PIT – Antonio Brown 53-yard pass from Ben Roethlisberger (Chris Boswell kick), 3:08. Steelers 31–14. **Drive: 4 plays, 75 yards, 1:56.**

**Third quarter**

- PIT – Vance McDonald 12-yard pass from Ben Roethlisberger (Chris Boswell kick), 8:18. Steelers 38–14. **Drive: 12 plays, 75 yards, 6:42.**
- PIT – Jesse James 8-yard pass from Ben Roethlisberger (Chris Boswell kick), 0:18. Steelers 45–14. **Drive: 11 plays, 57 yards, 5:48.**

**Fourth quarter**

- PIT – Jaylen Samuels 6-yard pass from Ben Roethlisberger (Chris Boswell kick), 14:55. Steelers 52–14. **Drive: 2 plays, 9 yards, 0:15.**
- CAR – Christian McCaffrey 1-yard run (Graham Gano kick), 5:35. Steelers 52–21. **Drive: 7 plays, 34 yards, 3:41.**

**Top passers**

- CAR – Cam Newton – 23/29, 193 yards, 2 TD, INT
- PIT – Ben Roethlisberger – 22/25, 328 yards, 5 TD

**Top rushers**

- CAR – Christian McCaffrey – 14 carries, 77 yards, TD
- PIT – James Conner – 13 carries, 65 yards, TD

**Top receivers**

- CAR – Christian McCaffrey – 5 receptions, 61 yards, 2 TD
- PIT – Antonio Brown – 6 receptions, 96 yards, TD

After a tough road win, the Steelers went back home to take on the Panthers on Thursday Night Football. The Panthers scored first in the first quarter when Cam Newton found Christian McCaffrey on a 20-yard pass to make it 7–0. However, the Steelers responded with 3 touchdowns of their own to close out the quarter: Ben Roethlisberger found JuJu Smith-Schuster on a 75-yard pass on the team's first offensive play of the game, and on the next scrimmage play, Vince Williams intercepted Cam Newton and returned it 17 yards for a touchdown. James Conner closed out the scoring in the first quarter when he scored from 2 yards out to make it 21–7. The Steelers would score again in the second quarter when Chris Boswell kicked a 50-yard field goal to make it 24–7. The Panthers would draw closer when Newton and McCaffrey connected again on a 25-yard pass to make it 24–14. Roethlisberger then found Antonio Brown on a 53-yard pass to make the score 31–14 at halftime. In the third quarter, it was all Steelers when Roethlisberger threw 2 more touchdown passes: a 12-yarder to Vance McDonald and then an 8-yarder to Jesse James to increase their lead to 45–14. In the fourth quarter, Roethlisberger found Jaylen Samuels on a 6-yard pass to put the Steelers up 52–14. McCaffrey then put up a 1-yard touchdown in the closing minutes to make the final score 52–21.

With the win, the Steelers improved to 6–2–1. The team's 52 points was the most ever scored in a single game at Heinz Field, and the most by the franchise since 1984. Ben Roethlisberger became the second quarterback to record a perfect 158.3 passer rating in four games in his career, after Peyton Manning.

==== Week 11: at Jacksonville Jaguars ====
Week Eleven: Pittsburgh Steelers at Jacksonville Jaguars – Game summary

Quarter	1	2	3	4	Total
**Steelers**	0	0	6	14	**20**
Jaguars	0	9	7	0	**16**

at TIAA Bank Field, Jacksonville, Florida

- Date: November 18
- Game time: 1:00 pm. EST
- Game weather: 73 °F (23 °C), mostly sunny
- Game attendance: 67,683
- Referee: Walt Anderson
- TV announcers (CBS): Jim Nantz, Tony Romo and Tracy Wolfson
- Recap, Gamebook

Game information

**First quarter**

- No scoring plays

**Second quarter**

- JAX – Josh Lambo 48-yard field goal, 13:10. Jaguars 3–0. **Drive: 15 plays, 69 yards, 8:57.**
- JAX – Josh Lambo 38-yard field goal, 8:34. Jaguars 6–0. **Drive: 6 plays, 38 yards, 3:28.**
- JAX – Josh Lambo 43-yard field goal, 3:37. Jaguars 9–0. **Drive: 9 plays, 37 yards, 4:46.**

**Third quarter**

- JAX – Leonard Fournette 2-yard run (Josh Lambo kick), 1:35. Jaguars 16–0. **Drive: 10 plays, 80 yards, 5:50.**
- PIT – Antonio Brown 78-yard pass from Ben Roethlisberger (pass failed), 1:17. Jaguars 16–6. **Drive: 2 plays, 84 yards, 0:52.**

**Fourth quarter**

- PIT – Vance McDonald 11-yard pass from Ben Roethlisberger (Chris Boswell kick), 2:28. Jaguars 16–13. **Drive: 8 plays, 80 yards, 2:38.**
- PIT – Ben Roethlisberger 1-yard run (Chris Boswell kick), 0:05. Steelers 20–16. **Drive: 7 plays, 67 yards, 1:39.**

**Top passers**

- PIT – Ben Roethlisberger – 27/47, 314 yards, 2 TD, 3 INT
- JAX – Blake Bortles – 10/18, 104 yards

**Top rushers**

- PIT – James Conner – 9 carries, 25 yards
- JAX – Leonard Fournette – 28 carries, 95 yards, 1 TD

**Top receivers**

- PIT – Antonio Brown – 5 receptions, 117 yards, 1 TD
- JAX – Leonard Fournette – 2 receptions, 46 yards

After a blowout victory against the Panthers, the Steelers traveled to Jacksonville to face the Jaguars. After a scoreless first quarter, the Jags put up 3 field goals in the second when Josh Lambo converted from 48, 38, and 43 yards out to make it 3–0, 6–0, and then 9–0 at halftime. In the third quarter, the Jaguars would make it 16–0 after Leonard Fournette ran for a 2-yard touchdown. From then on, it was all Steelers scoring when Ben Roethlisberger found Antonio Brown on a 78-yard pass to make it 16–6 heading into the fourth quarter. In the final quarter, Roethlisberger found Vance McDonald on an 11-yard touchdown pass to draw the Steelers within three points. On the Steelers' final offensive drive, Roethlisberger ran for a 1-yard touchdown to make it 20–16 with five seconds remaining in the game, completing the comeback victory.

With the win, the Steelers improved to 7–2–1. This would be the team's third straight season with a 6-game winning streak.

==== Week 12: at Denver Broncos ====
Week Twelve: Pittsburgh Steelers at Denver Broncos – Game summary

Quarter	1	2	3	4	Total
Steelers	0	10	7	0	**17**
**Broncos**	3	7	7	7	**24**

at Broncos Stadium at Mile High, Denver, Colorado

- Date: November 25
- Game time: 4:25 pm. EST/2:25 p.m. MST
- Game weather: 41 °F (5 °C), mostly sunny
- Game attendance: 76,536
- Referee: Tony Corrente
- TV announcers (CBS): Jim Nantz, Tony Romo and Tracy Wolfson
- Recap, Gamebook

Game information

**First quarter**

- DEN – Brandon McManus 41-yard field goal, 6:26. Broncos 3–0. **Drive: 8 plays, 39 yards, 3:10.**

**Second quarter**

- PIT – Chris Boswell 41-yard field goal, 6:29. Tied 3–3. **Drive: 9 plays, 56 yards, 5:20.**
- DEN – Matt LaCosse 10-yard pass from Case Keenum (Brandon McManus kick), 3:27. Broncos 10–3. **Drive: 6 plays, 75 yards, 3:02.**
- PIT – Alejandro Villanueva 2-yard pass from Chris Boswell (Chris Boswell kick), 0:00. Tied 10–10. **Drive: 12 plays, 75 yards, 3:27.**

**Third quarter**

- PIT – JuJu Smith-Schuster 97-yard pass from Ben Roethlisberger (Chris Boswell kick), 10:32. Steelers 17–10. **Drive: 1 play, 97 yards, 0:15.**
- DEN – Emmanuel Sanders 5-yard pass from Case Keenum (Brandon McManus kick), 5:30. Tied 17–17. **Drive: 2 plays, 43 yards, 0:37.**

**Fourth quarter**

- DEN – Phillip Lindsay 2-yard run (Brandon McManus kick), 9:17. Broncos 24–17. **Drive: 11 plays, 79 yards, 5:43.**

**Top passers**

- PIT – Ben Roethlisberger – 41/56, 462 yards, TD, 2 INT
- DEN – Case Keenum – 15/28, 197 yards, 2 TD

**Top rushers**

- PIT – James Conner – 13 rushes, 53 yards
- DEN – Phillip Lindsay – 14 rushes, 110 yards, TD

**Top receivers**

- PIT – JuJu Smith-Schuster – 13 catches, 189 yards, TD
- DEN – Emmanuel Sanders – 7 catches, 86 yards, TD

After a tough win over the Jags, the Steelers traveled out west to face the Broncos. The Broncos scored first when Brandon McManus kicked a 41-yard field goal to make it 3–0 for the first quarter's only points. The Steelers tied it up in the second quarter when Chris Boswell kicked a 41-yard field goal of his own to make it 3–3. The Broncos retook the lead when Case Keenum found Matt LaCosse on a 10-yard pass to make it 10–3. The Steelers tied it up when Boswell found Alejandro Villanueva on a 2-yard pass on a fake field goal to make it 10–10 at halftime. After the break, the Steelers went back to work as Ben Roethlisberger found JuJu-Smith Schuster on a 97-yard pass to take the lead 17–10. The Broncos then tied it up again when Keenum found Emmanuel Sanders on a 5-yard pass to make it 17–17 following a Chris Harris Jr. interception of Roethlisberger. In the fourth the Broncos retook the lead and went on to win the game when Philip Lindsay ran for a 2-yard touchdown to make the score 24–17. Roethlisberger tried to rally the Steelers into a potential overtime period, but his 3rd-and-goal pass intended for Antonio Brown would be intercepted by Shelby Harris with a minute left to play, sealing the win for the Broncos.

With their 6-game winning streak snapped, the Steelers fell to 7–3–1. This was the first road loss for the Steelers since Week 3 of the 2017 season.

==== Week 13: vs. Los Angeles Chargers ====
Week Thirteen: Los Angeles Chargers at Pittsburgh Steelers – Game summary

Quarter	1	2	3	4	Total
**Chargers**	7	0	8	18	**33**
Steelers	13	10	0	7	**30**

at Heinz Field, Pittsburgh, Pennsylvania

- Date: December 2
- Game time: 8:20 pm. EST
- Game weather: 57 °F (14 °C), clear
- Game attendance: 61,069
- Referee: Bill Vinovich
- TV announcers (NBC): Al Michaels, Cris Collinsworth, Michele Tafoya and Terry McAulay
- Recap, Gamebook

Game information

**First quarter**

- PIT – James Conner 1-yard rush (Chris Boswell kick), 9:20. Steelers 7–0. **Drive: 4 plays, 58 yards, 1:59.**
- PIT – James Conner 1-yard rush (kick failed), 4:41. Steelers 13–0. **Drive: 6 plays, 48 yards, 3:01.**
- LAC – Travis Benjamin 46-yard pass from Philip Rivers (Michael Badgley kick), 1:04. Steelers 13–7. **Drive: 6 plays, 75 yards, 3:37.**

**Second quarter**

- PIT – Chris Boswell 48-yard field goal, 2:40. Steelers 16–7. **Drive: 4 plays, 4 yards, 0:59.**
- PIT – Antonio Brown 28-yard pass from Ben Roethlisberger (Chris Boswell kick), 0:17. Steelers 23–7. **Drive: 6 plays, 91 yards, 1:18.**

**Third quarter**

- LAC – Keenan Allen 10-yard pass from Philip Rivers (Philip Rivers-Antonio Gates pass), 1:43. Steelers 23–15. **Drive: 13 plays, 88 yards, 8:07.**

**Fourth quarter**

- LAC – Desmond King 73-yard punt return (Philip Rivers-Keenan Allen pass), 12:52. Tied 23–23.
- LAC – Justin Jackson 18-yard rush (Michael Badgley kick), 8:09. Chargers 30–23. **Drive: 7 plays, 79 yards, 3:51.**
- PIT – Jaylen Samuels 10-yard pass from Ben Roethlisberger (Chris Boswell kick), 4:10. Tied 30–30. **Drive: 12 plays, 78 yards, 3:59.**
- LAC – Michael Badgley 29-yard field goal, 0:00. Chargers 33–30. **Drive: 11 plays, 64 yards, 4:10.**

**Top passers**

- LAC – Philip Rivers – 26/36, 299 yards, 2 TD
- PIT – Ben Roethlisberger – 29/45, 281 yards, 2 TD, 1 INT

**Top rushers**

- LAC – Justin Jackson – 8 carries, 63 yards, 1 TD
- PIT – James Conner – 15 carries, 60 yards, 2 TD

**Top receivers**

- LAC – Keenan Allen – 14 receptions, 148 yards, 1 TD
- PIT – Antonio Brown – 10 receptions, 154 yards, 1 TD

After a tough road loss, the Steelers returned home for a Sunday Night Football duel against the Chargers. The Steelers struck first in the first quarter when James Conner ran for two 1-yard touchdowns to make it 7–0 and then 13–0 (due to a failed PAT) but the Chargers would respond on a controversial touchdown, due to movement on the Chargers offensive line before the ball was snapped, when Philip Rivers found Travis Benjamin on a 46-yard pass to make it 13–7. In the second quarter, the Steelers pulled away as Chris Boswell kicked a 48-yard field goal to make it 16–7. This would be followed up with Ben Roethlisberger finding Antonio Brown on a 28-yard pass to make it 23–7 at halftime. In the third quarter, the Chargers drew closer when Rivers found Keenan Allen on a 10-yard pass (with a successful 2-point conversion) to make it 23–15. In the fourth quarter, they would tie the game up as Desmond King returned a punt 73 yards for a touchdown. Rivers then connected with Allen for another 2-point conversion to make it 23–23. The Chargers would then take the lead when Justin Jackson ran for an 18-yard touchdown to make it 30–23. The Steelers tied it up later on however when Roethlisberger found Jaylen Samuels on a 10-yard pass, making it 30–30. The Chargers would seal the game when Mike Badgley kicked a 29-yard field goal to make the final score 33–30.

With the loss, the Steelers fell to 7–4–1.

==== Week 14: at Oakland Raiders ====
Week Fourteen: Pittsburgh Steelers at Oakland Raiders – Game summary

Quarter	1	2	3	4	Total
Steelers	0	14	0	7	**21**
**Raiders**	7	3	0	14	**24**

at Oakland–Alameda County Coliseum, Oakland, California

- Date: December 9
- Game time: 4:25 pm. EST/1:25 p.m. PST
- Game weather: 55 °F (13 °C), partly cloudy
- Game attendance: 53,960
- Referee: Ronald Torbert
- TV announcers (Fox): Thom Brennaman, Chris Spielman and Shannon Spake
- Recap, Gamebook

Game information

**First quarter**

- OAK – Doug Martin 1-yard rush (Daniel Carlson kick), 10:44. Raiders 7–0. **Drive: 8 plays, 74 yards, 4:16.**

**Second quarter**

- PIT – Stevan Ridley 2-yard rush (Chris Boswell kick), 12:18. Tied 7–7. **Drive: 11 plays, 67 yards, 6:30.**
- OAK – Daniel Carlson 44-yard field goal, 8:04. Raiders 10–7. **Drive: 10 plays, 46 yards, 4:14.**
- PIT – JuJu Smith-Schuster 1-yard pass from Ben Roethlisberger (Chris Boswell kick), 0:10. Steelers 14–10. **Drive: 9 plays, 53 yards, 2:47.**

**Third quarter**

- No scoring plays.

**Fourth quarter**

- OAK – Lee Smith 3-yard pass from Derek Carr (Daniel Carlson kick), 5:20. Raiders 17–14. **Drive: 14 plays, 73 yards, 7:50.**
- PIT – JuJu Smith-Schuster 1-yard pass from Ben Roethlisberger (Chris Boswell kick), 2:55. Steelers 21–17. **Drive: 6 plays, 75 yards, 2:25.**
- OAK – Derek Carrier 6-yard pass from Derek Carr (Daniel Carlson kick), 0:21. Raiders 24–21. **Drive: 8 plays, 75 yards, 2:34.**

**Top passers**

- PIT – Ben Roethlisberger – 25/29, 282 yards, 2 TD
- OAK – Derek Carr – 25/34, 322 yards, 2 TD

**Top rushers**

- PIT – Jaylen Samuels – 11 carries, 28 yards
- OAK – Doug Martin – 16 carries, 32 yards, TD

**Top receivers**

- PIT – JuJu Smith-Schuster – 8 receptions, 130 yards, 2 TD
- OAK – Jared Cook – 7 receptions, 116 yards

After a tough loss at home, the Steelers traveled out west to face the Raiders. The Raiders scored first in the first quarter when Doug Martin ran for a 1-yard touchdown to make it 7–0 for that period's only score. The Steelers managed to tie it up in the second quarter when Stevan Ridley ran for a 2-yard touchdown to make it 7–7. The Raiders would retake the lead when Daniel Carson kicked a 44-yard field goal to make it 10–7. The Steelers moved back into the lead when Ben Roethlisberger found JuJu-Smith Schuster on a 1-yard pass to make it 14–10 at halftime. After a scoreless third quarter, the Raiders would retake the lead in the fourth when Derek Carr found Lee Smith on a 3-yard pass to make it 17–14. The Steelers then retook the lead when Roethlisberger found Smith-Schuster on another 1-yard pass to make it 21–17. The Raiders quickly answered when Carr found Derek Carrier on a 6-yard pass to retake the lead 24–21. Pittsburgh got the ball one final time, advancing deep into Raiders territory with a hook and lateral play from James Washington to Smith-Schuster, but kicker Chris Boswell slipped and missed the potential game-tying field goal.

With their third straight loss, the Steelers fell to 7–5–1 and finished 0–4 against the AFC West. Roethlisberger's record against the Raiders in Oakland also dropped to 0–4.

==== Week 15: vs. New England Patriots ====
Week Fifteen: New England Patriots at Pittsburgh Steelers – Game summary

Quarter	1	2	3	4	Total
Patriots	7	0	3	0	**10**
**Steelers**	7	7	0	3	**17**

at Heinz Field, Pittsburgh, Pennsylvania

- Date: December 16
- Game time: 4:25 pm. EST
- Game weather: 42 °F (6 °C), cloudy
- Game attendance: 65,280
- Referee: John Parry
- TV announcers (CBS): Jim Nantz, Tony Romo and Tracy Wolfson
- Recap, Gamebook

Game information

**First quarter**

- PIT – Vance McDonald 5-yard pass from Ben Roethlisberger (Chris Boswell kick), 8:45. Steelers 7–0. **Drive: 11 plays, 75 yards, 6:20.**
- NE – Chris Hogan 63-yard pass from Tom Brady (Stephen Gostkowski kick), 6:58. Tied 7–7. **Drive: 3 plays, 77 yards, 1:52.**

**Second quarter**

- PIT – Antonio Brown 17-yard pass from Ben Roethlisberger (Chris Boswell kick), 12:07. Steelers 14–7. **Drive: 8 plays, 92 yards, 4:17.**

**Third quarter**

- NE – Stephen Gostkowski 33-yard field goal, 0:20. Steelers 14–10. **Drive: 13 plays, 63 yards, 8:15.**

**Fourth quarter**

- PIT – Chris Boswell 48-yard field goal, 2:34. Steelers 17–10. **Drive: 13 plays, 66 yards, 5:13.**

**Top passers**

- NE – Tom Brady – 25/36, 279 yards, TD, INT
- PIT – Ben Roethlisberger – 22/34, 235 yards, 2 TD, 2 INT

**Top rushers**

- NE – Sony Michel – 13 rushes, 59 yards
- PIT – Jaylen Samuels – 19 rushes, 142 yards

**Top receivers**

- NE – Julian Edelman – 7 receptions, 90 yards
- PIT – James Washington – 3 receptions, 65 yards

After a tough road loss, the Steelers returned home for a game against the Patriots. In the first quarter, the Steelers scored first when Ben Roethlisberger found Vance McDonald on a 5-yard pass to make it 7–0. The Patriots tied the game up when Tom Brady found Chris Hogan on a 63-yard pass to make it 7–7. In the second quarter, the Steelers moved back into the lead when Roethlisberger found Antonio Brown on a 17-yard pass to make it 14–7 at halftime. In the third quarter, the Pats managed to score and come within 4 when Stephen Gostkowski kicked a 33-yard field goal to make it 14–10 for the quarter's only score. However, the Steelers moved up ahead by 7 in the fourth quarter when Chris Boswell kicked a 48-yard field goal to make it 17–10. The Pats were able to drive down the field with under 2 minutes left, but after a penalty which would back them further away from the first down marker, Brady would throw 4 straight incompletions to end the game with that final score.

With the win and 3-game losing streak snapped, the Steelers improved to 8–5–1. Roethlisberger's career record against the Patriots improved to 4–8. The team was also able to snap their 5-game losing streak to the Patriots, beating them for the first time since 2011. It was also their last victory against the Patriots during the Brady–Belichick era.

==== Week 16: at New Orleans Saints ====
Week Sixteen: Pittsburgh Steelers at New Orleans Saints – Game summary

Quarter	1	2	3	4	Total
Steelers	3	11	14	0	**28**
**Saints**	7	10	7	7	**31**

at Mercedes-Benz Superdome, New Orleans, Louisiana

- Date: December 23
- Game time: 4:25 pm. EST/3:25 p.m. CST
- Game weather: Played indoors (dome stadium)
- Game attendance: 73,086
- Referee: Craig Wrolstad
- TV announcers (CBS): Jim Nantz, Tony Romo and Tracy Wolfson
- Recap, Gamebook

Game information

**First quarter**

- PIT – Chris Boswell 49-yard field goal, 5:32. Steelers 3–0. **Drive: 9 plays, 29 yards, 4:46.**
- NO – Mark Ingram II 1-yard rush (Wil Lutz kick), 2:57. Saints 7–3. **Drive: 6 plays, 75 yards, 2:35.**

**Second quarter**

- PIT – Chris Boswell 30-yard field goal, 14:05. Saints 7–6. **Drive: 9 plays, 78 yards, 3:52.**
- NO – Alvin Kamara 8-yard rush (Wil Lutz kick), 10:22. Saints 14–6. **Drive: 8 plays, 75 yards, 3:43.**
- PIT – Jaylen Samuels 3-yard pass from Ben Roethlisberger (Ben Roethlisberger-Eli Rogers pass), 0:40. Tied 14–14. **Drive: 15 plays, 97 yards, 6:04.**
- NO – Wil Lutz 43-yard field goal, 0:02. Saints 17–14. **Drive: 4 plays, 50 yards, 0:38.**

**Third quarter**

- NO – Alvin Kamara 1-yard rush (Wil Lutz kick), 9:13. Saints 24–14. **Drive: 11 plays, 75 yards, 5:47.**
- PIT – Antonio Brown 3-yard pass from Ben Roethlisberger (Chris Boswell kick), 4:48. Saints 24–21. **Drive: 9 plays, 75 yards, 4:25.**
- PIT – Antonio Brown 20-yard pass from Ben Roethlisberger (Chris Boswell kick), 1:02. Steelers 28–24. **Drive: 4 plays, 66 yards, 1:36.**

**Fourth quarter**

- NO – Michael Thomas 2-yard pass from Drew Brees (Wil Lutz kick), 1:25. Saints 31–28. **Drive: 10 plays, 46 yards, 2:41.**

**Top passers**

- PIT – Ben Roethlisberger – 33/50, 380 yards, 3 TD
- NO – Drew Brees – 27/39, 326 yards, 1 TD

**Top rushers**

- PIT – Jaylen Samuels – 12 carries, 53 yards
- NO – Mark Ingram II – 11 carries, 35 yards, 1 TD

**Top receivers**

- PIT – Antonio Brown – 14 receptions, 185 yards, 2 TD
- NO – Michael Thomas – 11 receptions, 109 yards, 1 TD

After a tough win over the Patriots, the Steelers traveled south to take on the Saints. In the first quarter, the Steelers scored first when Chris Boswell kicked a 49-yard field goal to make it 3–0. In the first quarter, on 4th and 1 from the Pittsburgh 35, the Saints tried a long pass into the endzone, on which a defensive pass interference was called, giving the Saints 1st and goal at the 1, on which they would take the lead when Mark Ingram II ran for a 1-yard touchdown to make it 7–3. In the second quarter, the Steelers came within a point as Boswell kicked another field goal from 30 yards out to make it 7–6. The Saints pulled away when Alvin Kamara ran for an 8-yard touchdown to make it 14–6. The Steelers would tie it up when Ben Roethlisberger found Jaylen Samuels on a 3-yard pass (with a successful 2-point conversion) to make it 14–14. The Saints moved up 17–14 at halftime when Wil Lutz kicked a 43-yard field goal. In the third quarter, the Saints increased their lead when Kamara ran for a 1-yard touchdown to make it 24–14. The Steelers would take the lead when Roethlisberger found Antonio Brown on touchdown passes from 3 and 20 yards out to narrow the Saints' lead to 24–21 and then take the lead 28–24. In the fourth quarter, the Saints were able to complete the comeback when Drew Brees found Michael Thomas on a 2-yard pass to make the final score 31–28. Roethlisberger's best effort at a late rally would come up short when star wide receiver JuJu Smith-Schuster fumbled in Saints territory with less than a minute remaining, effectively sealing the win for the Saints.

With the loss, the Steelers fell to 8–6–1 and second place in the AFC North.

The game, ironically, was also Brown's last in a Steelers uniform. He would then tie with Brandon Marshall for most seasons with 1,000 yards and 100 receptions in NFL history with 6. He was subsequently benched for week 17 after his heated confrontation with Roethlisberger at practice. The Steelers would eventually trade Brown to the Oakland Raiders on March 10, 2019 for a third-round and a fifth-round pick in the 2019 NFL draft.

==== Week 17: vs. Cincinnati Bengals ====
Week Seventeen: Cincinnati Bengals at Pittsburgh Steelers – Game summary

Quarter	1	2	3	4	Total
Bengals	0	10	0	3	**13**
**Steelers**	0	3	7	6	**16**

at Heinz Field, Pittsburgh, Pennsylvania

- Date: December 30
- Game time: 4:25 pm. EST
- Game weather: 42 °F (6 °C), partly cloudy
- Game attendance: 63,874
- Referee: Carl Cheffers
- TV announcers (CBS): Kevin Harlan, Rich Gannon and Steve Tasker
- Recap, Gamebook

Game information

**First quarter**

- No scoring plays.

**Second quarter**

- CIN – Shawn Williams 58-yard interception return (Randy Bullock kick), 12:37. Bengals 7–0.
- CIN – Randy Bullock 49-yard field goal, 2:12. Bengals 10–0. **Drive: 12 plays, 51 yards, 6:31.**
- PIT – Matt McCrane 35-yard field goal, 0:00. Bengals 10–3. **Drive: 9 plays, 34 yards, 2:12.**

**Third quarter**

- PIT – JuJu Smith-Schuster 11-yard pass from Ben Roethlisberger (Matt McCrane kick), 3:50. Tied 10–10. **Drive: 3 plays, 74 yards, 1:25.**

**Fourth quarter**

- PIT – Matt McCrane 47-yard field goal, 8:35. Steelers 13–10. **Drive: 13 plays, 48 yards, 7:19.**
- CIN – Randy Bullock 32-yard field goal, 6:17. Tied 13–13. **Drive: 5 plays, 52 yards, 2:18.**
- PIT – Matt McCrane 35-yard field goal, 1:58. Steelers 16–13. **Drive: 12 plays, 58 yards, 4:21.**

**Top passers**

- CIN – Jeff Driskel – 12/24, 95 yards
- PIT – Ben Roethlisberger – 31/45, 287 yards, TD, INT

**Top rushers**

- CIN – Joe Mixon – 13 carries, 105 yards
- PIT – James Conner – 14 carries, 64 yards

**Top receivers**

- CIN – Alex Erickson – 6 receptions, 63 yards
- PIT – James Washington – 3 receptions, 64 yards

After a tough loss and their playoff chances on the line, the Steelers went home for the season finale at home for Round 2 against the Bengals. After a scoreless first quarter, the Bengals would score in the second quarter when Shawn Williams returned an interception 58 yards for a touchdown to make it 7–0. They made it 10–0 after Randy Bullock kicked a 49-yard field goal. The Steelers managed to get on the board before halftime when Matt McCrane kicked a 39-yard field goal to make it 10–3 at halftime. The Steelers managed to tie it up when Ben Roethlisberger found JuJu Smith-Schuster on an 11-yard pass to make it 10–10. They would then make it 13–10 when McCrane kicked a 47-yard field goal. The Bengals tied it up when Bullock kicked a 32-yard field goal. However, the Steelers would retake the lead when McCrane kicked a 35-yard field goal to make it 16–13 for the final score of the game.

With the 8th straight win over the Bengals, the Steelers finished their season 9–6–1. At the conclusion of the game, the Jumbotron showed the conclusion of the Browns-Ravens game, with most of the fans sticking around and most of players waiting on the field. However, the Ravens would win that game sending the Steelers to second place in the division, officially missing the playoffs for the first time in 5 years, thus capping off a disappointing and bitter end to one of the most turbulent seasons in franchise history.

=== Standings ===
==== Division ====
AFC North
	W	L	T	PCT	DIV	CONF	PF	PA	STK
^{(4)} Baltimore Ravens	10	6	0	.625	3–3	8–4	389	287	W3
Pittsburgh Steelers	9	6	1	.594	4–1–1	6–5–1	428	360	W1
Cleveland Browns	7	8	1	.469	3–2–1	5–6–1	359	392	L1
Cincinnati Bengals	6	10	0	.375	1–5	4–8	368	455	L2

==== Conference ====
AFC
#	Team	Division	W	L	T	PCT	DIV	CONF	SOS	SOV	STK
**Division leaders**
1 (Note: Kansas City finished ahead of LA Chargers in the AFC West based on division record, claiming the No. 1 seed.)	Kansas City Chiefs	West	12	4	0	.750	5–1	10–2	.480	.401	W1
2 (Note: New England claimed the No. 2 seed over Houston based on head-to-head victory.)	New England Patriots	East	11	5	0	.688	5–1	8–4	.482	.494	W2
3	Houston Texans	South	11	5	0	.688	4–2	9–3	.471	.435	W1
4	Baltimore Ravens	North	10	6	0	.625	3–3	8–4	.496	.450	W3
**Wild Cards**
5	Los Angeles Chargers	West	12	4	0	.750	4–2	9–3	.477	.422	W1
6	Indianapolis Colts	South	10	6	0	.625	4–2	7–5	.465	.456	W4
**Did not qualify for the postseason**
7	Pittsburgh Steelers	North	9	6	1	.594	4–1–1	6–5–1	.504	.448	W1
8	Tennessee Titans	South	9	7	0	.563	3–3	5–7	.520	.465	L1
9	Cleveland Browns	North	7	8	1	.469	3–2–1	5–6–1	.516	.411	L1
10	Miami Dolphins	East	7	9	0	.438	4–2	6–6	.469	.446	L3
11 (Note: Denver finished ahead of Cincinnati and Buffalo based on strength of victory. Cincinnati finished ahead of Buffalo based on record vs. common opponents. Cincinnati's cumulative record against Baltimore, Indianapolis, the Los Angeles Chargers and Miami was 3–2, compared to Buffalo's 1–4 cumulative record against the same four teams.)	Denver Broncos	West	6	10	0	.375	2–4	4–8	.523	.464	L4
12	Cincinnati Bengals	North	6	10	0	.375	1–5	4–8	.535	.448	L2
13	Buffalo Bills	East	6	10	0	.375	2–4	4–8	.523	.411	W1
14	Jacksonville Jaguars	South	5	11	0	.313	1–5	4–8	.549	.463	L1
15 (Note: NY Jets finished ahead of Oakland based on strength of victory.)	New York Jets	East	4	12	0	.250	1–5	3–9	.506	.438	L3
16	Oakland Raiders	West	4	12	0	.250	1–5	3–9	.547	.406	L1
**Tiebreakers** (Note: When breaking ties for three or more teams under the NFL's rules, they are first broken within divisions, then comparing only the highest ranked remaining team from each division.)

== Awards ==
AFC Offensive Player of The Week/Month
Position	Player	Week/Month
QB	Ben Roethlisberger	3, 10
RB	James Conner	8
RB	James Conner	October

AFC Defensive Player of The Week/Month
Position	Player	Week/Month
LB	T. J. Watt	1, 5
CB	Joe Haden	15

Other Awards
Award	Position	Player	Week
FEDEX Ground Player of The Week	RB	James Conner	1, 8
Built Ford Tough Offensive Line of The Week	OL	Alejandro Villanueva, Ramon Foster, Maurkice Pouncey, David DeCastro, Marcus Gilbert	6
Pepsi Rookie of The Week	RB	Jaylen Samuels	15

=== Other ===
Name	Date	Details
Richard Mann	January 17	Retired as WR Coach
Randy Fichtner	January 18	Promoted to Offensive coordinator
Darryl Drake	January 26	Hired as WR Coach
Carnell Lake	February 7	Resigned as DB Coach
Karl Dunbar	February 8	Hired as DL Coach
Tom Bradley	February 8	Hired as DB Coach

== See also ==
- List of NFL teams affected by internal conflict
