= Emmanuel Ogbah =

Nigerian American football player (born 1993)

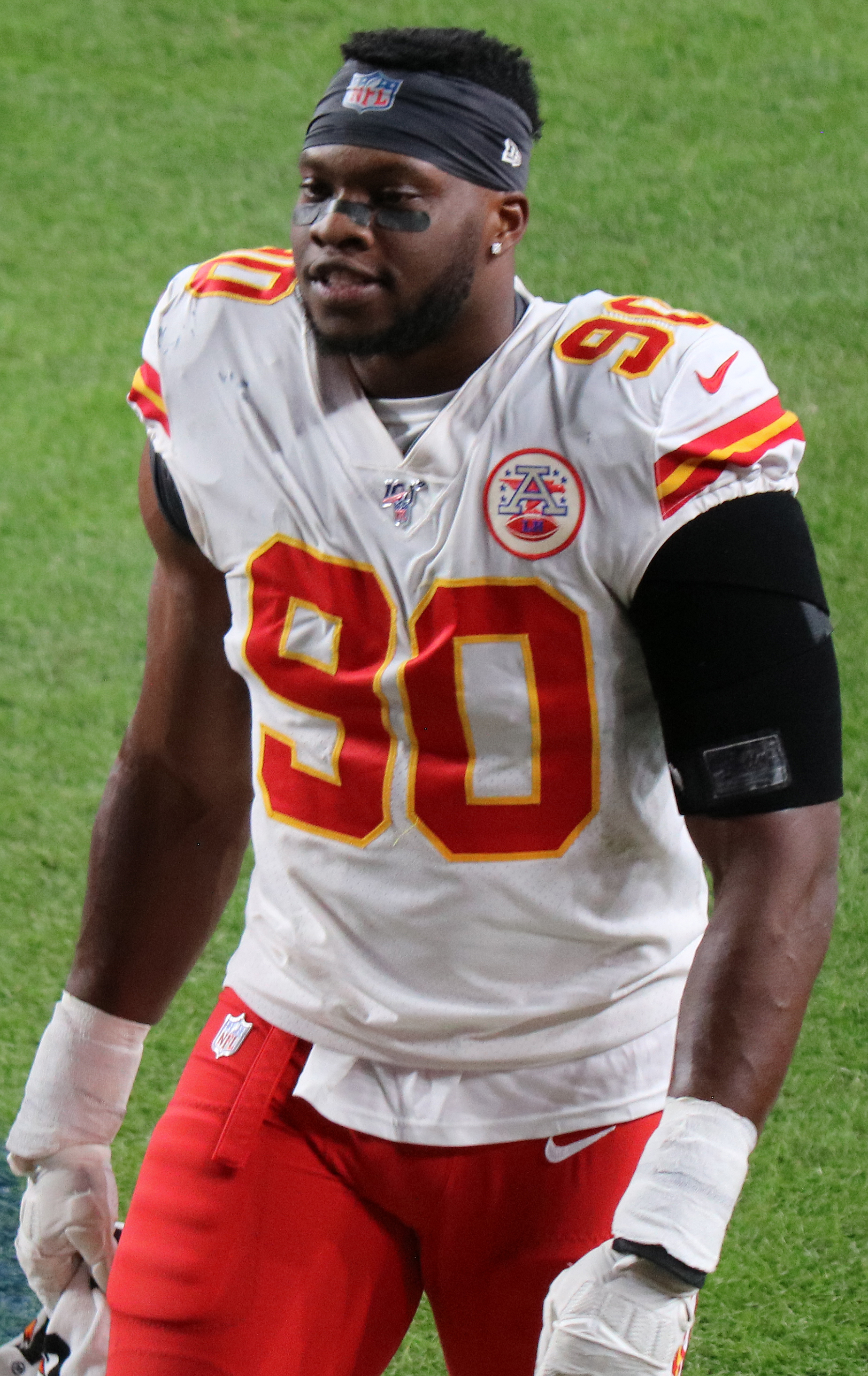
- Ogbah with the Kansas City Chiefs in 2019

No. 90 – Kansas City Chiefs
- Position: Defensive end
- Roster status: Practice squad

Personal information
- Born: November 6, 1993 (age 33); Lagos, Nigeria
- Listed height: 6 ft 4 in (1.93 m)
- Listed weight: 275 lb (125 kg)

Career information
- High school: George Bush (Richmond, Texas, U.S.)
- College: Oklahoma State (2012–2015)
- NFL draft: 2016: 2nd round, 32nd overall pick

Career history
- Cleveland Browns (2016–2018); Kansas City Chiefs (2019); Miami Dolphins (2020–2024); Jacksonville Jaguars (2025); Kansas City Chiefs (2026–present)*
- * Offseason or practice squad member only

Awards and highlights
- Super Bowl champion (LIV); First-team All-American (2015); Big 12 Co-Defensive Player of the Year (2015); Big 12 Defensive Lineman of the Year (2014); 2× First-team All-Big 12 (2014, 2015)

Career NFL statistics as of 2025
- Total tackles: 332
- Sacks: 48.0
- Forced fumbles: 9
- Fumble recoveries: 5
- Pass deflections: 42
- Interceptions: 2
- Stats at Pro Football Reference

Emmanuel Ikechukwu Ogbah (born November 6, 1993) is a Nigerian professional American football defensive end for the Kansas City Chiefs of the National Football League (NFL). He played college football for the Oklahoma State Cowboys, and was selected by the Cleveland Browns in the second round of the 2016 NFL draft. He also played for the Kansas City Chiefs and Miami Dolphins.

== Early life ==
Ogbah was born in Lagos, Nigeria and moved to Houston, Texas, in the United States at the age of nine. He attended George Bush High School in Fort Bend County, Texas. He committed to Oklahoma State University to play college football. He chose Oklahoma State in part based on recommendations from Russell Okung and attended George Bush High and Oklahoma State.

== College career ==
After redshirting as a true freshman in 2012, Ogbah played in all 13 games of the 2013 season. He finished the year with 20 tackles and four sacks. As a sophomore in 2014, he was named the Big-12 Conference Defensive Lineman of the Year after recording 49 tackles and 11 sacks.

== Professional career ==
Pre-draft measurables
Height	Weight	Arm length	Hand span	Wingspan	40-yard dash	10-yard split	20-yard split	20-yard shuttle	Three-cone drill	Vertical jump	Broad jump	Bench press
6 ft 4 1/4 in (1.94 m)	273 lb (124 kg)	35 1/2 in (0.90 m)	10 in (0.25 m)	6 ft 11 7/8 in (2.13 m)	4.63 s	1.60 s	2.68 s	4.50 s	7.26 s	35.5 in (0.90 m)	10 ft 1 in (3.07 m)	20 reps
All values from NFL Combine

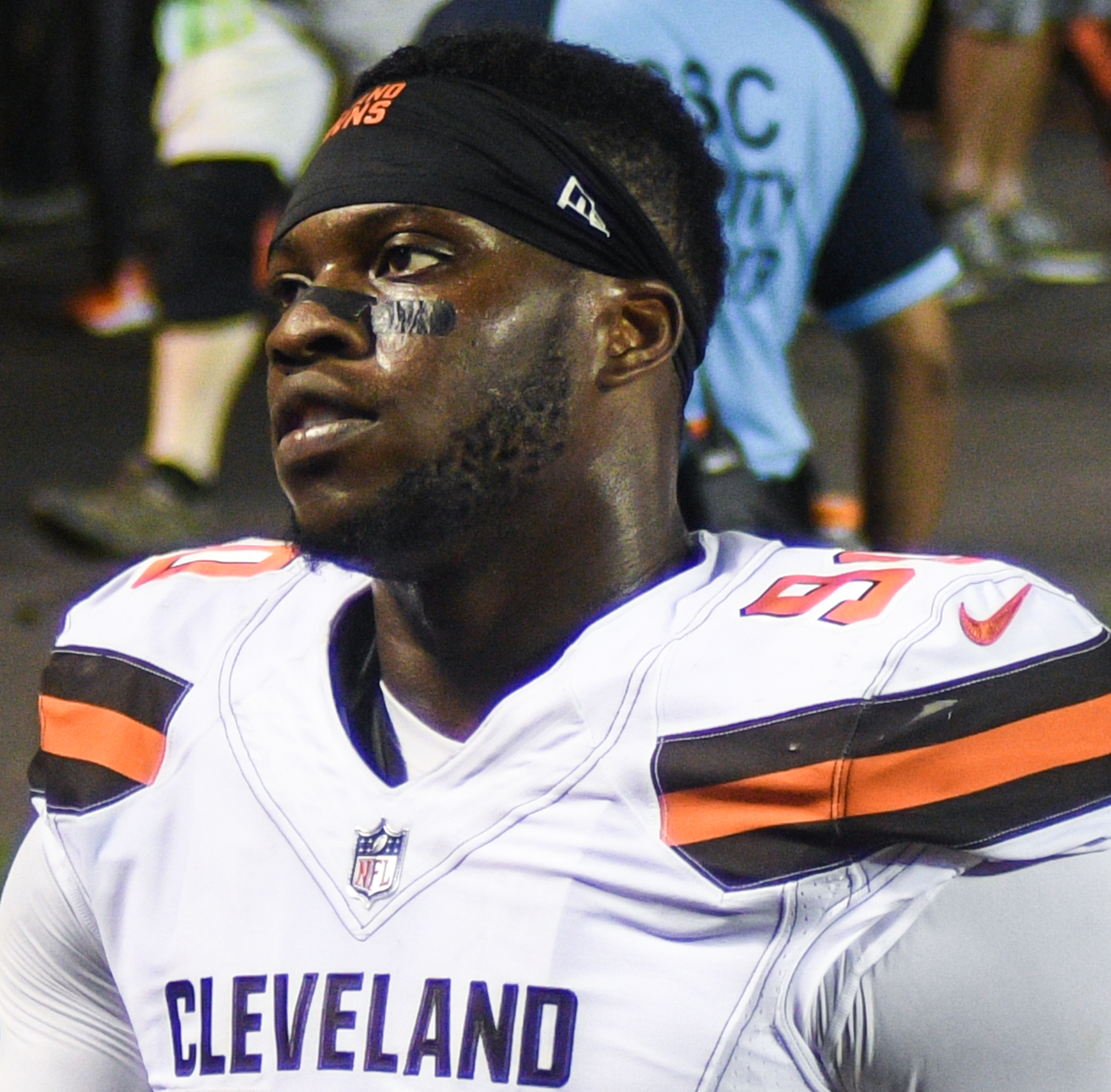
Ogbah with the Browns in 2017

=== Cleveland Browns ===
Ogbah was drafted by the Cleveland Browns in the second round, 32nd overall, of the 2016 NFL draft. On May 25, 2016, he signed a four-year contract worth $6.6 million, which included a $3 million signing bonus. Ogbah was listed as a starter for the Browns for the season opener. He started all 16 games for the Browns as a rookie, finishing sixth on the team with 53 tackles and leading the team with 5.5 sacks.

In 2017, Ogbah entered the season as the Browns' starting defensive end. He started the first 10 games before suffering a foot injury in Week 11. It was revealed that he suffered a fractured foot and was ruled out for the season. He was placed on injured reserve on November 21, 2017.

=== Kansas City Chiefs ===
Ogbah was traded to the Kansas City Chiefs on April 1, 2019, in exchange for safety Eric Murray. In Week 3 against the Baltimore Ravens, Ogbah sacked Lamar Jackson 1.5 times as the Chiefs won 33–28. In Week 10, Ogbah suffered a torn pectoral and was ruled out the rest of the season. He finished the season with 32 tackles and tied his career-high with 5.5 sacks. Without Ogbah, the Chiefs won Super Bowl LIV against the San Francisco 49ers.

=== Miami Dolphins ===
On March 20, 2020, Ogbah signed a two-year, $15 million contract with the Miami Dolphins.

In Week 5 against the 49ers, Ogbah recorded a strip sack on C. J. Beathard late in the fourth quarter which was recovered by the Dolphins to secure a 43–17 win. In Week 9 against the Arizona Cardinals, Ogbah recorded a strip sack on Kyler Murray which was recovered by teammate Shaq Lawson who returned it for a 36 yard touchdown during the 34–31 win.

On March 14, 2022, Ogbah signed a four-year, $65 million contract extension with the Dolphins. In Week 10 against the Cleveland Browns, Ogbah suffered a season-ending tricep injury, which required surgery.

On February 23, 2024, the Dolphins released Ogbah, then re-signed on July 23.

=== Jacksonville Jaguars ===
On April 27, 2025, Ogbah signed with the Jacksonville Jaguars on a one-year deal worth up to $5 million.

=== Kansas City Chiefs (second stint) ===
On August 11, 2026, Ogbah signed a one-year contract with the Kansas City Chiefs, with whom he won Super Bowl LIV. Ogbah was released by Kansas City as a part of final roster cuts on August 30; he was re-signed to the team's practice squad the next day.
