= List of organizational conflicts in the NFL =

Organizational conflict is a recurring issue in many workplaces due to numerous factors. In the National Football League (NFL) and many other professional sports organizations, internal drama between players, coaches, and executives may often be publicized by the national media.

The 1989 Buffalo Bills, who were later nicknamed the "Bickering Bills", 1993 Houston Oilers, and 2018 Pittsburgh Steelers, whose conflict was later called "Days of our Steelers" in reference to the soap opera television series Days of Our Lives, became prominent examples of teams with widely known internal conflict. Aside from NFL teams, widely publicized scandals or conflicts involving league executives have also occurred.

== List of NFL teams affected by publicized organizational conflict or scandals ==
This list of NFL seasons includes teams that were negatively affected by publicized scandals or organizational conflict between their members.

| Year | Team | Notes | References |
|---|---|---|---|
| 1977 | Pittsburgh Steelers | Despite a 9–5 record and divisional title, several scandals emerged between players, coaches, owner Art Rooney, and even members of opposing teams. This included numerous players being arrested for alleged cocaine possession, contract holdouts, and lawsuits, in addition to regressed play from the team's vaunted defense that led to a first-round playoff loss. The SB Nation blog Behind the Steel Curtain comments that if social media existed in 1977, this season would likely dwarf the Steelers' 2018 season in terms of controversy. | |
| 1981 | Baltimore Colts | Owner Robert Irsay and head coach Mike McCormack constantly feuded with players, belittling them for the team's historically poor performance. A preseason injury to linebacker Ed Simonini doomed the defense, which would hold records for defensive ineptitude for decades. Irsay and McCormack also argued amongst themselves; during a Week 11 loss to the Eagles, Irsay took over play calling duties over McCormack's refusal to bench quarterback Bert Jones, only for Irsay to himself reinsert Jones later on in the same game. McCormack was fired after the season, where the team finished 2–14 but lost out on the first overall pick in the draft due to a tiebreaker. Frustrated with the poor conditions at Baltimore Memorial Stadium and the city of Baltimore refusing to pay for upgrades, Irsay controversially moved the team to Indianapolis in 1984. | |
| 1989 | Buffalo Bills | Nicknamed the "Bickering Bills" due to several conflicts and arguments between players including Jim Kelly, Thurman Thomas, Ronnie Harmon, and Chris Burkett, the latter of whom was notably cut after arguing with Kelly during a game. Kelly in particular attracted media attention due to his public criticisms of his teammates. In addition, assistant coaches Tom Bresnahan and Nick Nicolau got into a fistfight while reviewing film. The Bills narrowly made the playoffs at 9–7 and lost in the first round but found success with the "K-Gun offense" in that game, which would propel them to four straight Super Bowl appearances afterwards. | |
| 1990 | New England Patriots | Seeking to improve on a 5–11 season, the team fell into turmoil after players Zeke Mowatt, Bob Perryman, and Michael Timpson sexually harassed and exposed themselves to Boston Herald reporter Lisa Olson the day after a Week 2 win against the Indianapolis Colts. The incident and the ensuing media firestorm proved to be major distractions for the team, who lost the next 14 games and finished the season 1–15. Owner Victor Kiam made several crass comments about Olson, who was also harassed and received death threats from Patriots fans. The Herald subsequently transferred Olson to Australia, where she remained until 1998. After the season, Olson sued Kiam, general manager Patrick Sullivan, and the three players. Sullivan resigned, first-year head coach Rod Rust was fired, and the three players were fined. Kiam sold the team in 1992. | |
| 1993 | Houston Oilers | Coming off a bitter playoff loss, the Oilers featured assistant coaches Buddy Ryan and Kevin Gilbride feuding over clashing philosophies, culminating in the two getting into a fight during a game on national television. In addition, several players were involved with controversy and conflict, and one player, Jeff Alm, committed suicide after a DUI crash that killed his best friend. Though the Oilers finished 12–4 with a divisional title, their quick playoff loss and drama boiled over, and owner Bud Adams traded most of the team's star players in the offseason, eventually moving the team to Nashville, Tennessee to become the Tennessee Titans. | |
| 1998 | San Diego Chargers | After going 4–12 the year prior, the Chargers used the second overall pick in the draft to select quarterback Ryan Leaf. Hoping he would be the catalyst for a successful future, Leaf instead became the focus for many conflicts for the team, including yelling at reporters and getting into arguments with teammates during practice. Head coach Kevin Gilbride was fired after a 2–4 start. The Chargers finished 5–11, with Leaf throwing just two touchdowns compared to 15 interceptions before being benched and is now considered one of the biggest draft busts in NFL history. | |
| 2003 | Oakland Raiders | Tensions boiled the year following the teams embarrassing defeat in Super Bowl XXXVII, starting in training camp when Bill Romanowski punched teammate Marcus Williams in the face during a scrimmage, breaking his eye socket and forcing Williams to retire. Other players took out their frustrations on head coach Bill Callahan, with Charles Woodson publicly accusing Callahan of trying to sabotage the team's season and saying the locker room was in a mutiny against him. Callahan further irked the team's aging veterans by stating that their salaries needed to be reduced to improve the team's future to get younger players. After a Week 13 loss to the Denver Broncos, Callahan publicly called his players "the dumbest team in America." A season-ending injury in Week 7 to reigning MVP Rich Gannon further doomed the Raiders, who fell into a tailspin and ultimately finished the season 4–12. Callahan was fired after the season. The Raiders did not have another winning season or make the playoffs until 2016. | |
| 2005 | Philadelphia Eagles | After a Super Bowl XXXIX appearance, the Eagles entered their 2005 season as the NFC favorite, aiming for their fifth consecutive NFC Championship game. However, trouble began after contract disputes between Terrell Owens and Brian Westbrook during the summer, which led to tension in the locker room. Despite a solid 3–1 start, the Eagles fell apart with injuries, and contract holdouts and arguments caused the team to finish at 6–10, missing the playoffs for the first time since 1999. The tension reached a boiling point when Owens and team ambassador Hugh Douglas got into a fistfight after Douglas reportedly said there were players on the team "faking injuries". Two days after an ESPN interview in which Owens made several comments perceived as verbal jabs at quarterback Donovan McNabb and the team, the Eagles suspended Owens indefinitely for "conduct detrimental to the team." While Westbrook would receive a new contract, Owens was released in the offseason. The Eagles finished the year having been swept by all their divisional rivals despite having a sweep on them the season prior, becoming the first team in NFL history to suffer this feat. | |
| 2005 | Minnesota Vikings | Following the departure of star receiver Randy Moss, the Vikings were rocked by the infamous "Love Boat" scandal that saw several players allegedly engage in sexual acts with over 100 women, including sex workers flown in from Atlanta. A total of 17 players were implicated and charged, including Daunte Culpepper, Moe Williams, Fred Smoot, and Bryant McKinnie, though the charges were later dropped due to a lack of evidence. Culpepper suffered an injury after Week 7 and was replaced by Brad Johnson, leading to the collapse of the Vikings' pass game and causing them to miss the playoffs despite a late season surge. Coach Mike Tice was not signed to a new contract following the season, with some blaming it on the love boat scandal and the team missing the playoffs. Culpepper requested and was granted a trade due to being unhappy in Minnesota. | |
| 2006 | Cincinnati Bengals | Questions arose in the offseason after quarterback Carson Palmer made a faster than expected comeback from a potentially career-ending knee injury he received during the previous year's playoffs. Some in the media questioned whether head coach Marvin Lewis was rushing Palmer back from his injury, although both Palmer and Lewis denied this. Nevertheless, the bigger problem was questions continuing about the team's culture and seemingly lax tolerance for character concerns, as nine players were arrested over the course of the season for charges including drug possession, domestic violence, driving under the influence, and burglary. Though the team remained in playoff contention until the final week of the regular season, the Bengals finished 8–8, resulting in the team having more players arrested than wins. Despite the questions about his early return, Palmer ultimately played all but one snap during the season. | |
| 2007 | Atlanta Falcons | In the wake of quarterback Michael Vick's indictment over illicit dogfighting activities, new head coach Bobby Petrino did not get along with players throughout the Falcons' doomed 4–12 season. Multiple players openly questioned Petrino's coaching capabilities to the media. Petrino abruptly resigned his post the day after Vick's conviction and after just 13 games to take the head coach position for Arkansas, only leaving behind a hand-written note to shocked players after previously assuring owner Arthur Blank he would stay. Vick was replaced by Matt Ryan in the following draft. | |
| 2009 | Oakland Raiders | Head coach Tom Cable found himself embroiled in controversies throughout the season, starting in training camp after he punched assistant coach Randy Hanson, breaking Hanson's jaw. Hanson filed a lawsuit against Cable and the Raiders for the incident. In addition, both of Cable's ex-wives accused Cable of domestic violence while another ex-girlfriend filed a lawsuit against Cable for abuse. Cable settled the lawsuits with all parties. The Raiders ultimately finished 5–11, as former first overall draft pick JaMarcus Russell struggled and finished last in most statistical categories. Russell, whose work ethic was questioned throughout his time in Oakland, was released in the following offseason. Cable would be fired after the 2010 season. | |
| 2012 | New York Jets | The team was coming off a season in which they not only failed to defend their two consecutive AFC championship game appearances, but collapsing after an 8-5 start to miss the playoffs overall. The Jets came into 2012 as a playoff favorite, even with the sudden trade for Tim Tebow. A quarterback controversy ensued as the season went on, with starter Mark Sanchez having notably regressed. Sanchez and the team’s low-point was in front of a prime-time audience in the humiliating Butt Fumble play during a Thanksgiving game against the Patriots. In addition, questionable moves by head coach Rex Ryan and sloppy play from the team overall led to the media describing the 2012 Jets as a "circus". The team stumbled to a 6–10 finish, a far cry from consecutive AFC Championship Game appearances in 2009 and 2010, and, as of 2025, have been the most recent team of the big four North American sporting leagues to suffer the longest drought in making the postseason, having last made it in their 2010 season. | |
| 2013 | Tampa Bay Buccaneers | Considerable tension between head coach Greg Schiano and the team's players and fans marred the season. Schiano did not get along with quarterback Josh Freeman, and benched him following a poor start. Freeman was released during the bye week. The team also experienced an outbreak of MRSA and two infected players, Carl Nicks and Lawrence Tynes, ended up retiring prematurely due to the effects of their infections. As the team started off 0–8 and finished 4–12, many fans called for Schiano's firing, and one radio station erected a billboard with the message "Fire Schiano." Schiano was fired after the season. | |
| 2016 | San Francisco 49ers | After finishing 5–11 the year before, owner Jed York hired Chip Kelly to be the head coach. Kelly, the team's third head coach in three seasons, frequently clashed with general manager Trent Baalke over roster construction. Following a 1–4 start, Kelly benched quarterback Blaine Gabbert for backup Colin Kaepernick, whose kneeling during the national anthem received considerable media attention. Kaepernick played poorly and the team went 1–11 with him as the starter, ultimately finishing 2–14. Both Kelly and Baalke were fired after the season. | |
| 2017 | New York Giants | Coming off an 11–5 season and a playoff appearance in 2016, the Giants hoped to continue their success in 2017 under second-year head coach Ben McAdoo, where many thought the team would be NFC East champions, let alone winning the NFC overall. Instead, the Giants began the season 0–5 en route to a poor 3–13 record. The season was marred by numerous injuries as well as conflicts between McAdoo and several of his players. McAdoo suspended cornerbacks Dominique Rodgers-Cromartie and Janoris Jenkins after each violated team rules, which caused outrage among multiple Giants players, some of whom anonymously spoke to the media and criticized McAdoo for losing the locker room and not caring when some players appeared to give up on the team. McAdoo also benched 14-year veteran quarterback Eli Manning before a game against the Oakland Raiders, thus ending Manning's consecutive start streak at 210 games. The move was heavily criticized by players, commentators, and fans, and following the team's loss to the Raiders, the Giants fired McAdoo. | |
| 2018 | Pittsburgh Steelers | Despite three straight playoff appearances and a 7–2–1 start, the Steelers failed to make the playoffs, as head coach Mike Tomlin was criticized for several controversial in-game decisions and his inability to control the actions of his players. Ben Roethlisberger publicly criticized several teammates (including rookies) for their play, resulting in him being criticized in the media as well. Le'Veon Bell engaged in a contract hold-out in the offseason that eventually escalated into him sitting out for the entire season. Antonio Brown frequently made headlines due to his behavior both on and off the field, ultimately leaving the team before the final regular season game after not receiving a team award. Both Bell and Brown departed Steelers' roster in the offseason. The team's drama was chronicled throughout the season by Pittsburgh-based YouTuber UrinatingTree, who made weekly videos in his series "Days of Our Steelers." | |
| 2019 | Washington Redskins | After head coach Jay Gruden was fired, numerous controversies regarding team president Bruce Allen and owner Daniel Snyder surfaced, including the team's treatment of its cheerleaders and players, toxic team culture, sexual assault allegations, and refusal to change the team's controversial name. Allen himself and other team executives were fired after the team's dismal 3–13 finish, and Washington dropped the "Redskins" moniker the following season and rebranded as the Commanders in 2022. | |
| 2020 | Houston Texans | Controversial transactions by head coach/general manager Bill O'Brien, in addition to declining team play, resulted in O'Brien's firing after an 0–4 start. In addition, star players with large contracts such as J. J. Watt and Deshaun Watson became disgruntled by the team's decisions and direction, with both players requesting trades in the offseason. Watson was later accused of sexual assault following the season and was deactivated as a result. With Watson and Watt either being traded or inactive, the Texans were put in a precarious situation the following season. | |
| 2021 | Jacksonville Jaguars | Newly hired head coach Urban Meyer was constantly in the headlines due to several incidents on and off the field, which included kicking placekicker Josh Lambo in the thigh, skipping a team flight after a game to party at his restaurant in Ohio, and arguing with assistant coaches, receiver Marvin Jones, and running back James Robinson. He was fired after only 13 games due to his controversial behavior throughout the season and strained relations with players and staff. | |
| 2021 | Las Vegas Raiders | A troubled season that saw head coach Jon Gruden resign due to emails with racist, misogynistic, homophobic and vulgar language from the past being leaked, as well as the mysterious resignations of several team executives in the offseason. Several players were arrested or released for player misconduct, with Henry Ruggs and Nate Hobbs being arrested for driving under the influence while Damon Arnette was released after he brandished firearms and made death threats in a video he uploaded to Instagram. Ruggs' incident resulted in the death of another driver and also resulted in his release. Despite the chaos, the Raiders made the playoffs at 10–7 but lost in the first round. | |
| 2022 | Arizona Cardinals | Multiple Cardinals players and coaches got into trouble for off-field incidents before and during the season. DeAndre Hopkins got suspended for six games for failing a drug test, Marquise Brown was arrested during the offseason for speeding, and assistant coach Sean Kugler was fired by the team after he allegedly groped a woman in Mexico City before an international game against the San Francisco 49ers. Additionally, quarterback Kyler Murray and the Cardinals organization engaged in a lengthy contract dispute during the offseason. When they finally agreed to an extension, the Cardinals included a clause within the contract that required Murray to study film for four hours a week, which was harshly criticized and perceived as stereotypical towards black quarterbacks. As the season progressed, the relationship between Murray and head coach Kliff Kingsbury crumbled. The off-field noise and injuries to key players, including Murray, were too much to overcome and the Cardinals cratered to a ghastly 4-13 record after making the playoffs in 2021. Several former Cardinals criticized the team culture under Kingsbury, general manager Steve Keim, and team owner Michael Bidwill. Following the season, Kingsbury was fired and Keim stepped down due to health concerns. | |
| 2023 | Buffalo Bills | Fresh off an "emotionally draining" season, pressure was mounting on head coach Sean McDermott to get the Bills to a Super Bowl with an aging and costly roster, and receiver Stefon Diggs was reportedly disgruntled towards the team and quarterback Josh Allen. The Bills started the season off strong, but struggles on offense and injuries to key defensive starters led to a 2–4 slump that resulted in offensive coordinator Ken Dorsey getting fired mid-season. Despite further drama such as pass rusher Von Miller being arrested for alleged domestic violence and McDermott having past controversial comments on the September 11 attacks revealed in an exposé article, the team rallied to win six of their final seven games to clinch their fourth straight division title, only to lose in the divisional round for the third season in a row after kicker Tyler Bass missed a potential game-tying field goal. Following the season, Buffalo cut several veterans including Tre'Davious White and Jordan Poyer to meet the salary cap and traded Diggs to the Houston Texans. McDermott would be fired after the 2025 season, with the Bills failing to reach the Super Bowl during his tenure with the team. | |
| 2024 | New York Jets | Despite high preseason expectations after the return of quarterback Aaron Rodgers from a ruptured Achilles tendon in Week 1 of the previous season and a mid-season trade for his longtime Green Bay Packers teammate Davante Adams, the Jets' season went off the rails due to a decline in defensive play and alleged tension between Rodgers, teammates, and head coach Robert Saleh, who was fired after week 5 by owner Woody Johnson despite Rodgers denying having anything to do with the firing. General manager Joe Douglas was also fired before the end of a 5–12 campaign that extended the Jets' playoff drought, the longest active drought in North American professional sports, and reports of Johnson's sons meddling with team operations and influencing player transactions based on the players' Madden NFL ratings also surfaced. Rodgers and Adams were both jettisoned from the team in the offseason. | |
| 2026 | San Francisco 49ers | Prior to the season starting, wide receiver Brandon Aiyuk had made multiple social media posts attacking the 49ers' front office, and had wished to be released so he could sign with the Washington Commanders. Aiyuk had also been issued an arrest warrant from a December 2025 incident where he had filmed himself speeding past Levi's Stadium. Shortly before training camp started, head coach Kyle Shanahan suffered serious injuries in a car crash in which he was looking at his cell phone. In addition, owner Jed York was arrested at a trailer park in East Palestine, Ohio for soliciting prostitution. Additionally, the 49ers became associated in a federal fraud investigation in August 2026 after police arrested 35-year old Daejon Love, who was impersonating as a wide receiver for the 49ers, fabricating a football career in order to gain the trust of women as part of an alleged $1.3 million romance and investment fraud scheme. A viral conspiracy theory has also spread that attributes the team's injury problems to an electrical substation adjacent to their practice facility. | |

== League-wide issues ==
- Racial issues faced by Black quarterbacks
- NFL lockout
- NFL controversies

== See also ==
- NFL player conduct policy
