= George Bush High School =

Public high school in Texas, USA

Bush High School

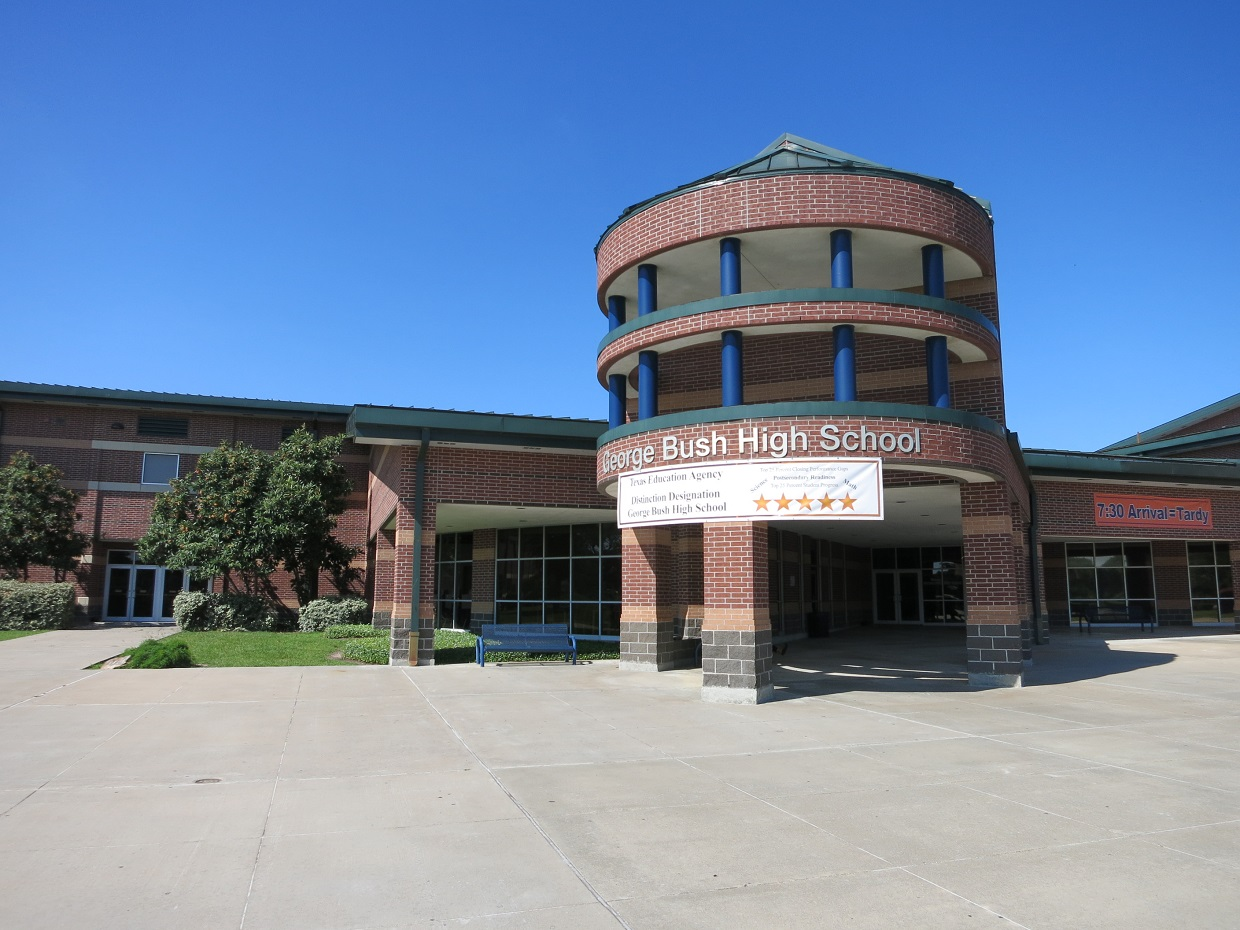

Location
- 6707 FM 1464 Road; Richmond, Fort Bend, TX; United States; 29.7054°N 95.6854°W

Information
- School type: Public high school
- Established: 2001
- School district: Fort Bend Independent School District
- Principal: Mario A. MacDonald
- Teaching staff: 139.11 (FTE)
- Grades: 9–12
- Enrollment: 2,428 (2024–2025)
- Student to teacher ratio: 17.45
- Campus type: Suburban
- Colors: Orange, White, and Navy Blue
- Athletics conference: 6A
- Mascot: Bronco
- Named for: George H. W. Bush
- 2011 TEA Rating: Academically Acceptable
- Website: School Website
- Last updated: July 7th, 2026

George Bush High School is a public high school located in the Mission Bend census-designated place and in unincorporated Fort Bend County, Texas, serving students in grades 9–12. The school has a "Richmond, Texas" postal address despite not being within the Richmond city limits. The school is part of the Fort Bend Independent School District and serves several areas of unincorporated Fort Bend County, including Mission Bend. The high school is named after the forty-first president of the United States, George H. W. Bush, who attended the school's inauguration. The school colors are orange, white, and navy blue. The average annual enrollment is approximately 2,200 students.

George Bush High School was established in 2001 in order to help educate the increasing population of Richmond, Texas. George Bush is a member of the University Interscholastic League and offers a variety of sports programs. Athletic teams compete in the 6A division and are known as the "Bush Broncos". Extracurricular activities are also offered in the form of performing arts, school publications, and clubs. Notable alumni of the school include NFL linemen Russell Okung and Emmanuel Ogbah, and NBA player Kelly Oubre Jr.

The school's campus borders the Fort Bend County/Harris County line.

== History ==
George Bush High School was established on August 16, 2001 in order to help educate the increasing population of Richmond, TX; this made it FBISD's eighth comprehensive high school. To add, there was no senior class in the inaugural year, the sophomore and junior class consisted of students from Kempner High School and Austin High School.

== Academics ==
George Bush High School operates on a 7:30 a.m. to 2:50 p.m. schedule, which includes three lunch periods designated to students based on their 5th period class. For activities, special events, and anything else out of the ordinary, the school provides two different schedules, including the "activity" and "advisory" schedules respectively. Furthermore, During the first 5-10 minutes of 4th period, GBHS broadcasts 'Bronco News', providing the community with updates about events, upcoming activities, and incidents.

Class Schedule
Period	1	2	3	4	5	6	7
Time	7:30–8:19	8:25–9:14	9:20–10:09	10:25–11:14	11:20–1:00	1:06–1:55	2:01–2:50
Lunch	A	B	C				
Lunch during 5th period	11:14-11:44	11:52-12:22	12:30-1:00				

== Extracurricular activities ==
The Broncos are members of the University Interscholastic League and are classified as a 6A school, the largest classification in Texas. Throughout its history, George Bush has won one state championship, boys' basketball in 2010. Several graduates have gone on to have successful collegiate and professional athletic careers, most notably NFL lineman Russell Okung and MLB infielder Anthony Rendon, both of whom were drafted sixth overall in their respective leagues.

=== Athletics ===
==== Boys' Basketball ====
In 2010, the boys' basketball team advanced to state tournament for the first time in the school's history. The team went through the playoffs undefeated and eventually won the state championship with a 65-58 win over Lakeview Centennial High School, marking the first athletic state championship in the school's history.

== Feeder patterns ==
The following elementary schools feed into Bush:

- Mission
- Holley
- Townewest
- Drabek
- Jordan
- Patterson
- Seguin (partial)

The following middle schools feed into Bush:

- Crockett
- Hodges Bend
- Garcia (partial)

== Notable alumni ==
- Ola Adeniyi, NFL player, most recently played for the Tennessee Titans
- Josh Jones, NFL player for the Seattle Seahawks
- Emmanuel Ogbah, NFL player for Miami Dolphins
- Chamberlain Oguchi, former Olympic basketball team member for Nigeria
- Russell Okung, former NFL player, 6th overall pick in 2010 NFL draft
- Kelly Oubre Jr., NBA player for Philadelphia 76ers
- Anthony Rendon, MLB player for Los Angeles Angels, 6th overall pick in 2011 MLB draft
- Tyler Smith, NBA player for Milwaukee Bucks
