= Russell Okung =

American football player (born 1988)

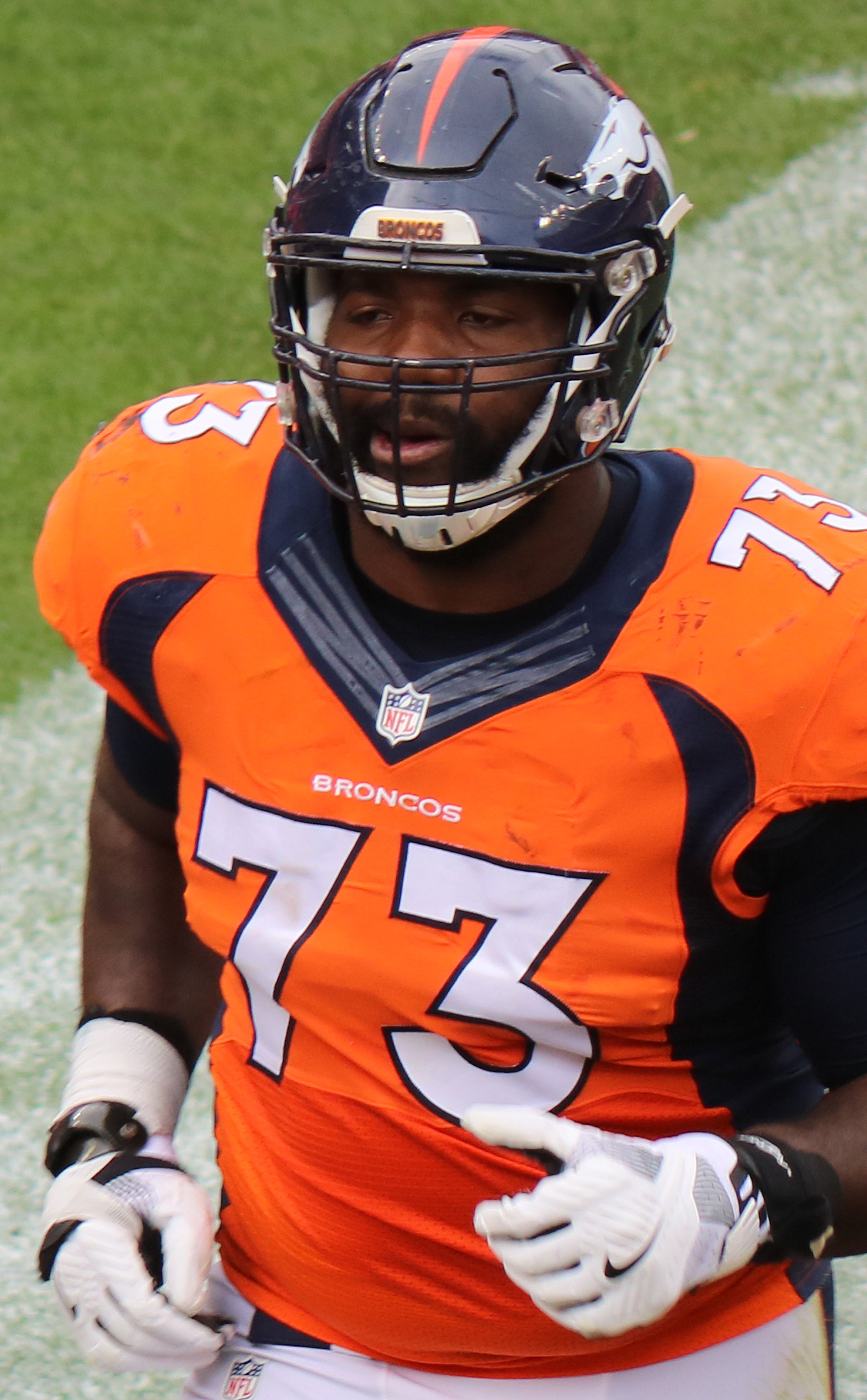
- Okung with the Denver Broncos in 2016

No. 76, 73
- Position: Offensive tackle

Personal information
- Born: October 7, 1988 (age 38); Houston, Texas, U.S.
- Listed height: 6 ft 5 in (1.96 m)
- Listed weight: 310 lb (141 kg)

Career information
- High school: George Bush (Richmond, Texas)
- College: Oklahoma State (2006–2009)
- NFL draft: 2010: 1st round, 6th overall pick

Career history
- Seattle Seahawks (2010–2015); Denver Broncos (2016); Los Angeles Chargers (2017–2019); Carolina Panthers (2020)

Awards and highlights
- Super Bowl champion (XLVIII); 2× Pro Bowl (2012, 2017); Jim Parker Trophy (2009); Big 12 Offensive Lineman of the Year (2009); Dick Bogert Award (2006); Unanimous All-American (2009); First-team All-American (2008); 2× First-team All-Big 12 (2008, 2009)

Career NFL statistics
- Games played: 131
- Games started: 131
- Fumble recoveries: 2
- Stats at Pro Football Reference

Russell Bassey Okung (/oʊˈkʊŋ/ oh-KUUN; born October 7, 1988) is an American former professional football player who was an offensive tackle in the National Football League (NFL). He played college football for the Oklahoma State Cowboys, and was twice recognized as an All-American, including a unanimous selection in 2009. He was selected by the Seattle Seahawks with the sixth overall pick in the 2010 NFL draft, and also played for the Denver Broncos, Los Angeles Chargers, and Carolina Panthers.

== Early life ==
Russell Bassey Okung was born in Houston, Texas. He attended George Bush High School in Fort Bend, where he was a first-team All-Greater Houston and first-team all-district selection. He was also one of the state's top performers in the discus throw (PR of 47.50 meters). Considered a three-star prospect by Rivals.com, Okung was listed as the No. 33 offensive tackle prospect in the class of 2006. At 250 pounds (113 kg) coming out of high school, he did not possess the prototypical tackle bulk. Okung was recruited by a number of major schools, including Oklahoma, LSU, and Nebraska. He committed to Oklahoma State in January 2006.

== College career ==
Okung attended Oklahoma State University, where he played for coach Mike Gundy's Oklahoma State Cowboys football team from 2006 to 2009. As a true freshman, he moved into the starting lineup for the first time against Kansas and held the position of right tackle for the rest of the season (eight straight starts). He ended the season by being voted as a member of All-Big 12 freshman team (by The Sporting News) and was named the Dick Bogert Award winner as Oklahoma State's top freshman.

In his sophomore season, he started all thirteen games, having been moved permanently to left tackle. The Cowboys’ offensive line gave up just five sacks in eight Big 12 games to lead the league in that category. Okung earned honorable mention all-Big 12 honors (by coaches). He was also named to the Rivals.com all-bowl team after holding Indiana's Greg Middleton, the NCAA's sack leader, without a tackle in the 2007 Insight Bowl victory.

As a junior, Okung led Oklahoma State with 71 knockdown blocks, and was named a first-team all-conference selection by the coaches. He also was named to Pro Football Weekly′s 2008 All-America team. Okung currently has started 34 straight games for the longest active streak on the team.

In 2009, Okung was listed at No. 1 on Rivals.com′s preseason offensive tackle power ranking. He was also named to the 2009 Outland Trophy watch list. On October 14, 2009, Okung was named one of twelve semifinalists—and the only offensive lineman—for the Lombardi Award.

In a game against Texas A&M on October 10, Okung held then-NCAA sack leader, Von Miller, without a quarterback sack. That effort was the second time during his career he has not allowed a sack against the nation's leader at the time. Against Texas on October 31, Okung held the Longhorn pass rush, including All-American candidate Sergio Kindle, without a quarterback sack. According to Sports Illustrated's Tony Pauline, that performance "has solidified his projection as the top senior tackle" in the 2010 NFL Draft. On November 24, 2009, Okung was named one of three finalists for the 2009 Outland Trophy, alongside Mike Iupati and Ndamukong Suh.

On December 1, 2009, Okung was named Big 12 Offensive Lineman of the Year in a vote of the league's coaches. He was also recognized as a unanimous first-team 2009 All-American. Despite tweaking his knee in practice earlier that week, Okung played in the 2010 Cotton Bowl Classic to end his career at Oklahoma State with a streak of 47 straight starts.

== Professional career ==
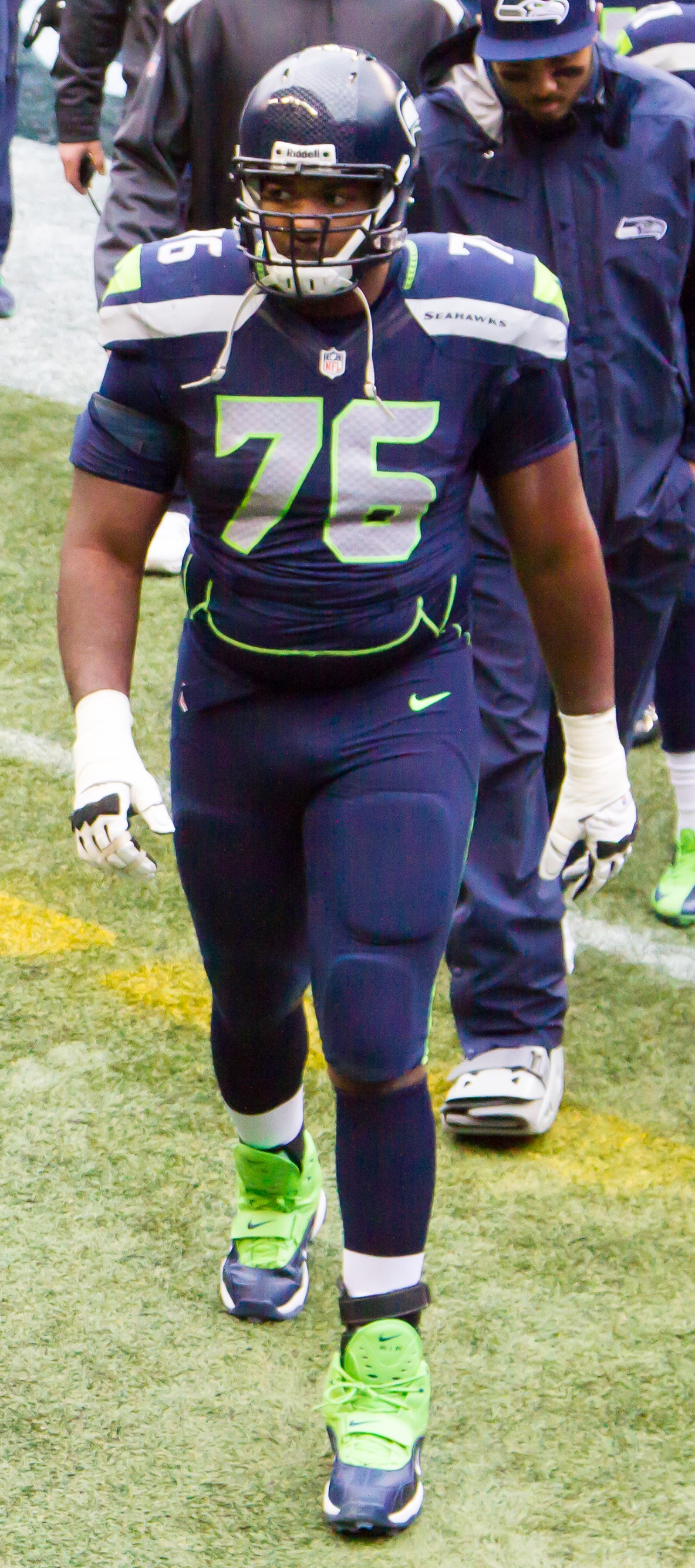
Okung with the Seattle Seahawks in 2013

=== Pre-draft ===
Okung was considered one of the best offensive tackles available in the 2010 NFL draft, and drew comparisons to D'Brickashaw Ferguson. According to NFL.com's Gil Brandt, Okung "will start and play a lot of years in the NFL." NFL.com's Bucky Brooks even projected Okung as the No. 1 pick overall, as did Scout.com′s Chris Steuber. Sports Illustrated′s Tony Pauline described Okung as "a complete offensive tackle with a large upside", who "stands out in pass protection while also dominating as a run blocker". The Kansas City Chiefs were believed to be one of the NFL teams to target Okung in the draft, as well as the Washington Redskins.

Pre-draft measurables
Height	Weight	Arm length	Hand span	40-yard dash	10-yard split	20-yard split	20-yard shuttle	Three-cone drill	Vertical jump	Broad jump	Bench press
6 ft 5 1/4 in (1.96 m)	307 lb (139 kg)	36 in (0.91 m)	10 1/2 in (0.27 m)	5.21 s	1.81 s	3.02 s	4.80 s	7.79 s	32.5 in (0.83 m)	8 ft 9 in (2.67 m)	38 reps
All values from NFL Combine/Pro Day

=== Seattle Seahawks ===
Okung was selected 6th overall by the Seattle Seahawks, making him only the second Oklahoma State offensive lineman ever picked in the first round of an NFL draft, along with John Ward, who was selected 25th overall by the Minnesota Vikings in 1970, and was the highest OSU draft pick since Barry Sanders went 3rd overall in the 1989 NFL draft. On August 6, 2010, Okung was signed by the Seahawks to a six-year contract worth a maximum of $48 million, with more than $29 million in guaranteed money. He was injured 6 games in his first NFL season high-ankle sprains on both ankles, but played well in the remaining 10. He saw limited action in the Seahawks' fourth game of the season in St. Louis against the Rams on October 3, before leaving the game in the first half after re-injuring his ankle.

Okung started the first twelve games in the 2011 regular season for the Seahawks. On December 1, 2011, he suffered a season-ending injury late in Seattle's 31–14 victory over Philadelphia. Trent Cole flipped Okung over his back which resulted in Okung suffering a torn right pectoral muscle. He was put on Injured Reserve after the game.

Okung started 15 games in the 2012 regular season for the Seahawks. He started both playoff games versus the Washington Redskins and Atlanta Falcons as well. 2012 marked Okung's first season without missing consecutive games since entering the NFL in 2010. He was voted as a starter in the 2012–2013 Pro Bowl making it his very first appearance. He was considered among many football analysts as being a top 5 Left Tackle in the 2012–2013 season while contributing to an offense that featured C Max Unger, RB Marshawn Lynch, and QB Russell Wilson in the Pro Bowl too.

Okung started in only 8 games due to injury in 2013, but the Seahawks finished the season 13–3. In the playoffs, the Seahawks beat both the New Orleans Saints and San Francisco 49ers to reach Super Bowl XLVIII. The Seahawks won the Super Bowl 43–8 after they beat the Denver Broncos to give Okung his first Super Bowl ring.

Okung started 14 games in the 2014 season and help the Seahawks finish with a 12–4 record. The Seahawks beat both the Carolina Panthers and Green Bay Packers to reach Super Bowl XLIX. The Seahawks failed to repeat as Super Bowl champions after they lost 28–24 to the New England Patriots.

Okung started in 13 games in 2015 and the Seahawks finished with a 10–6 record and earned the #6 seed. The Seahawks defeated the Minnesota Vikings 10–9 in the Wild Card game, but lost 31–24 in the Divisional round to the Panthers.

=== Denver Broncos ===
Following the end of his six-year contract with the Seattle Seahawks in 2016, Russell Okung opted to represent himself as a free agent in the NFL. Okung called his decision "Betting on Myself." During his free agency, Okung met with the New York Giants, Pittsburgh Steelers and Detroit Lions, was invited to visit with the San Francisco 49ers and didn't initially rule-out resigning with the Seattle Seahawks.

On March 17, 2016, Okung signed with the Denver Broncos on a one-year deal worth $5 million, which included an additional four-year, $48 million option. The contract he negotiated for himself for 2016, had no guaranteed money and was extremely team-friendly and incentive-laden and is solely based on his performance. Had the Broncos exercised the option to retain him in 2017 he would have received $21 million guaranteed for 2017 and 2018. He ended up starting all 16 games at left tackle for the Broncos in 2016.

On February 23, 2017, the Broncos declined Okung's option on his contract, making him a free agent.

=== Los Angeles Chargers ===
On March 9, 2017, Okung signed a four-year, $53 million contract with the Los Angeles Chargers. He started 15 games at left tackle in his first year as a Charger, on his way to his second Pro Bowl. He followed that up in 2018 with 15 starts at left tackle, missing one game with a groin injury.

During the 2019 offseason, Okung suffered a pulmonary embolism due to blood clots in his lungs. He was placed on the reserve/non-football illness list to start the season. He was activated off NFI on October 26, 2019.

=== Carolina Panthers ===
On March 4, 2020, the Chargers agreed to trade Okung to the Carolina Panthers in exchange for guard Trai Turner. The deal became official on March 18. He only made seven starts at left tackle due to injury.

On June 6, 2023, Okung announced his retirement from professional football.

== Personal life ==
Russell Okung is the son of Akpabio and Victor Okung. Okung, who graduated in 2009, was a marketing major at OSU. He is of Nigerian ancestry.

In 2016, Okung co-founded the Greater Foundation, an organization that "aims to equip the next generation with the tools to reach their highest potential through mentoring and leadership development." Through the Foundation and through other personal effort, Okung focuses on providing access and opportunity for underserved youth, particularly in the tech sector. Okung is also interested in the startup world and entrepreneurship. Since 2019 he has been open about his support for Bitcoin. He and fellow NFL player Matt Barkley have requested their salaries be paid in Bitcoin but were denied at the time. Okung has also launched his own Bitcoin brand and event series, "Bitcoin Is _", which had its inaugural installment on September 1, 2019, in Los Angeles. As of December 2020, he was buying bitcoin with half of his NFL salary.

In April 2020, Okung launched Okung Ventures.
