= Malik Golden =

American football player (born 1993)

No. 39
- Position: Safety

Personal information
- Born: April 27, 1993 (age 33); Hartford, Connecticut
- Listed height: 6 ft 1 in (1.85 m)
- Listed weight: 205 lb (93 kg)

Career information
- High school: Cheshire Academy (Cheshire, Connecticut)
- College: Penn State
- NFL draft: 2017: undrafted

Career history
- San Francisco 49ers (2017)*; Pittsburgh Steelers (2017–2018)*
- * Offseason or practice squad member only
- Stats at Pro Football Reference

Malik Miles Golden (born April 27, 1993) is an American former football safety. He played college football at Penn State.

== Professional career ==
Pre-draft measurables
Height	Weight	40-yard dash	10-yard split	20-yard split	20-yard shuttle	Vertical jump	Broad jump
6 ft 0 in (1.83 m)	201 lb (91 kg)	4.5 s	1.64 s	2.58 s	4.33 s	35 in (0.89 m)	10 ft 5 in (3.18 m)

=== San Francisco 49ers ===
Golden signed with the San Francisco 49ers as an undrafted free agent on May 4, 2017. He was waived by the 49ers on June 9, 2017.

=== Pittsburgh Steelers ===
On July 28, 2017, Golden signed with the Pittsburgh Steelers. He was waived/injured by the Steelers on September 2, 2017, with a groin injury and was placed on injured reserve. He was released with an injury settlement on September 12, 2017. He re-signed with the Steelers on January 19, 2018.

On September 1, 2018, Golden was waived/injured by the Steelers and was placed on injured reserve.
