= Ola Adeniyi =

Nigerian-born American football player (born 1997)

Olasunkanmi Adeniyi
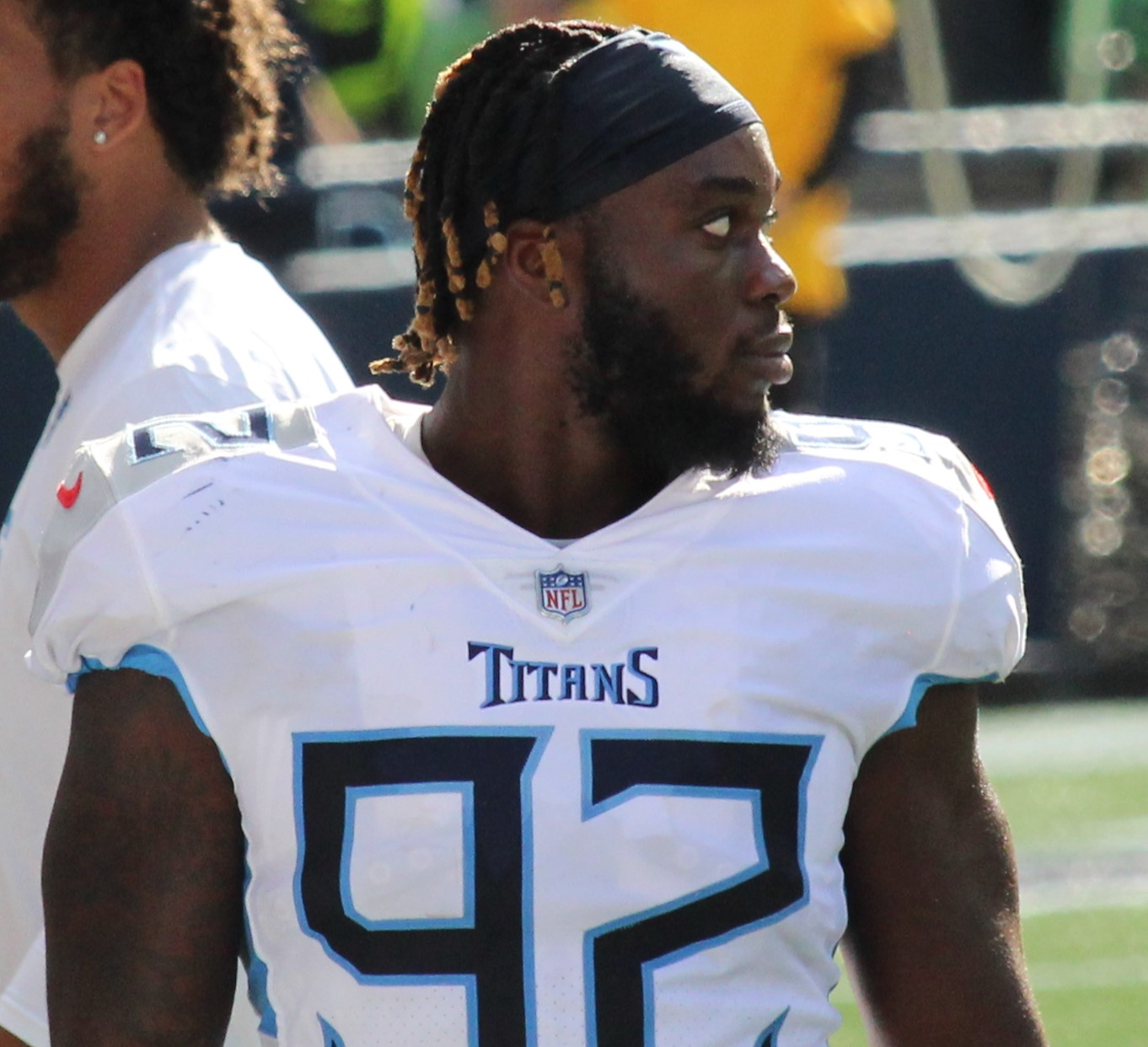
- Adeniyi with the Tennessee Titans in 2021

No. 92
- Position: Linebacker

Personal information
- Born: September 12, 1997 (age 29); Lagos, Nigeria
- Listed height: 6 ft 1 in (1.85 m)
- Listed weight: 248 lb (112 kg)

Career information
- High school: George Bush (Richmond, Texas, U.S.)
- College: Toledo
- NFL draft: 2018: undrafted

Career history
- Pittsburgh Steelers (2018–2020); Tennessee Titans (2021–2022); Pittsburgh Steelers (2022)*
- * Offseason or practice squad member only

Awards and highlights
- Second-team All-MAC (2017)

Career NFL statistics
- Total tackles: 49
- Sacks: 2.5
- Pass deflections: 1
- Forced fumbles: 3
- Stats at Pro Football Reference

Olasunkanmi "Ola" Adeniyi (born September 12, 1997) is a Nigerian-born former professional American football linebacker. He played college football at Toledo. He was signed by the Pittsburgh Steelers as an undrafted free agent in 2018.

== Early life ==
When Adeniyi was six years old, his mother, Esther, moved to the United States in order set up a better life for Adeniyi's family. Adeniyi and his older brother, Olamide, stayed with a family member in Nigeria. After two years, he and his brother moved to Houston, Texas reuniting with their mother. He graduated from George Bush High School in Fort Bend County, Texas. As a senior, he recorded 76 tackles, of which 18 were for loss, and five sacks. He signed to play football for the Toledo Rockets in February 2014.

== College career ==
Adeniyi did not play as a true freshman in 2014 and chose to redshirt. As a redshirt freshman in 2015, he played in seven games as a backup.

Adeniyi's breakout year came in 2016 as a redshirt sophomore as he played in all 13 of Toledo's games, starting 12. In those 13 games, he tallied 49 tackles (eight for loss) and four sacks.

As a redshirt junior in 2017, Adeniyi played in all 14 of Toledo's games, recording 66 tackles (20 for loss), 8.5 sacks, and three forced fumbles. He was named to the 2017 All-MAC Second-team. After the season, he declared for the 2018 NFL draft.

== Professional career ==
=== Pittsburgh Steelers (first stint) ===
Adeniyi signed with the Pittsburgh Steelers as an undrafted free agent on April 28, 2018. He was placed on injured reserve on September 3, 2018. He was activated off injured reserve on December 1, 2018.

In Week 9 of the 2019 season against the Indianapolis Colts, Adeniyi forced a fumble on Chester Rogers during a kick return and the ball was recovered by teammate Johnny Holton in the 26–24 win.

=== Tennessee Titans ===
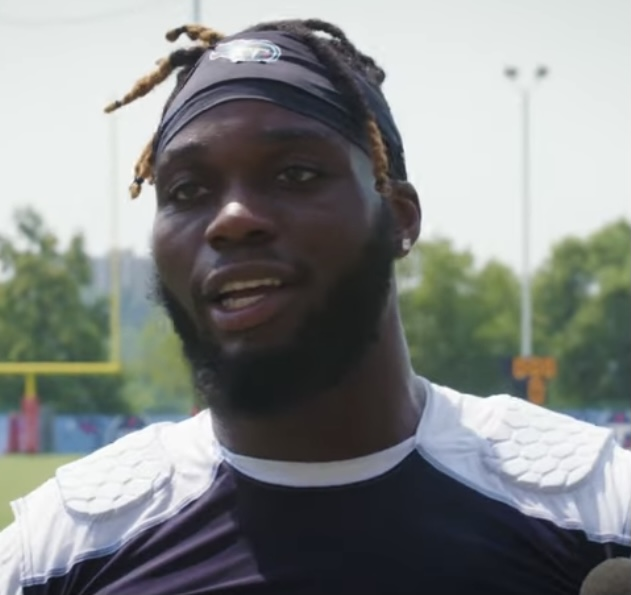
Adeniyi in 2021

Adeniyi signed with the Tennessee Titans on March 22, 2021. He entered the season as a backup linebacker and core special teamer. He finished third on the team in special teams tackles, and had a career-high 2.5 sacks on defense.

On March 25, 2022, Adeniyi re-signed with the Titans. He was placed on injured reserve on October 17, 2022 with a neck injury. He was activated on December 3. On December 12, Adeniyi was released by the Titans.

=== Pittsburgh Steelers (second stint) ===
On December 13, 2022, Adeniyi signed a deal to return to the Steelers.
