= R. J. Prince =

American football player (born 1995)

Profile
- Position: Offensive guard

Personal information
- Born: April 19, 1995 (age 31); Albemarle, North Carolina
- Listed height: 6 ft 6 in (1.98 m)
- Listed weight: 311 lb (141 kg)

Career information
- High school: Albemarle High School
- College: North Carolina
- NFL draft: 2018: undrafted

Career history
- Pittsburgh Steelers (2018-2019)*; Baltimore Ravens (2019–2020); New England Patriots (2021)*
- * Offseason or practice squad member only
- Stats at Pro Football Reference

Roger Darin "R. J." Prince Jr. (born April 19, 1995) is an American football offensive guard. He played college at North Carolina before going undrafted to the Pittsburgh Steelers in 2018.

== Professional career ==
=== Pittsburgh Steelers ===
Prince was signed by the Pittsburgh Steelers after going undrafted in the 2018 NFL draft. He was waived on September 1, 2018, and was signed to the practice squad the next day. He signed a reserve/future contract on December 31, 2018. He was waived on May 13, 2019.

=== Baltimore Ravens ===
On May 16, 2019, Prince was signed by the Baltimore Ravens. He was waived on August 31, 2019, and was signed to the practice squad the next day. He signed a reserve/future contract with the Ravens on January 13, 2020. He was waived on July 27, 2020. He was re-signed to their practice squad on November 10, 2020. He was elevated to the active roster on December 2 and January 9, 2021, for the team's week 12 and wild card playoff games against the Pittsburgh Steelers and Tennessee Titans, and reverted to the practice squad after each game. His practice squad contract with the team expired after the season on January 25, 2021.

=== New England Patriots ===
On June 17, 2021, Prince signed a two-year deal contract, worth $1 million with the New England Patriots. He was waived on August 24, 2021.
