= Minkah Fitzpatrick =

American football player (born 1996)

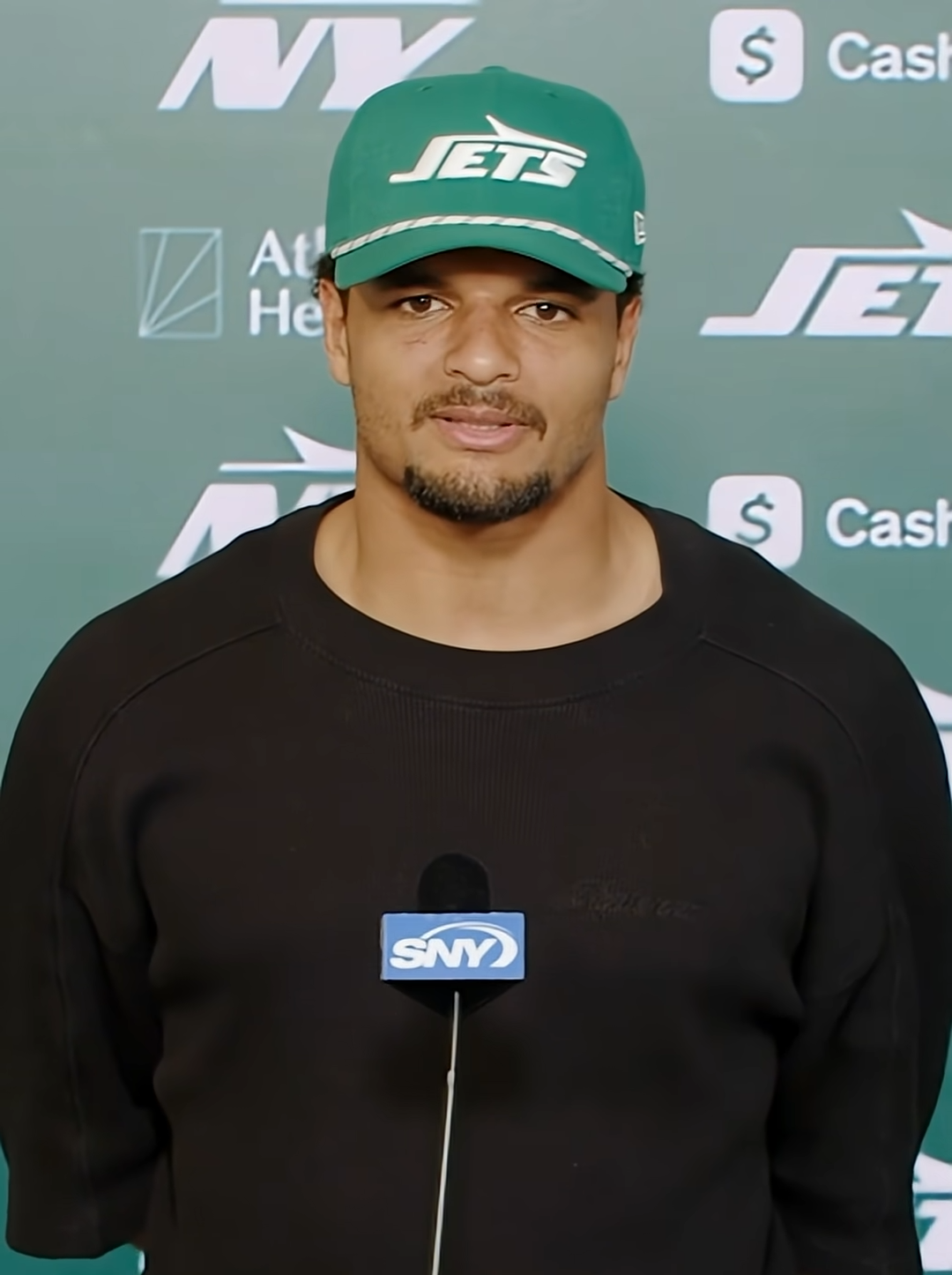
- Fitzpatrick with the New York Jets in 2026

No. 29 – New York Jets
- Position: Safety
- Roster status: Active

Personal information
- Born: November 17, 1996 (age 30); Old Bridge, New Jersey, U.S.
- Listed height: 6 ft 1 in (1.85 m)
- Listed weight: 207 lb (94 kg)

Career information
- High school: St. Peter's Prep (Jersey City, New Jersey)
- College: Alabama (2015–2017)
- NFL draft: 2018: 1st round, 11th overall pick

Career history
- Miami Dolphins (2018–2019); Pittsburgh Steelers (2019–2024); Miami Dolphins (2025); New York Jets (2026–present)

Awards and highlights
- 3× First-team All-Pro (2019, 2020, 2022); 5× Pro Bowl (2019, 2020, 2022–2024); NFL interceptions co-leader (2022); 2× CFP national champion (2015, 2017); Chuck Bednarik Award (2017); Jim Thorpe Award (2017); Unanimous All-American (2017); Consensus All-American (2016)

Career NFL statistics as of Week 10, 2026
- Total tackles: 745
- Sacks: 1.0
- Forced fumbles: 6
- Fumble recoveries: 8
- Pass deflections: 63
- Interceptions: 22
- Defensive touchdowns: 5
- Stats at Pro Football Reference

Minkah Annane Fitzpatrick Jr. (born November 17, 1996) is an American professional football safety for the New York Jets of the National Football League (NFL). He played college football for the Alabama Crimson Tide, and was selected by the Miami Dolphins in the first round of the 2018 NFL draft. He has also played for the Pittsburgh Steelers.

== Early life ==
Fitzpatrick attended St. Peter's Preparatory School in Jersey City, New Jersey, where he played high school football for the Marauders. He was a wide receiver on offense and a defensive back on defense. In 2014, he caught 45 passes for 1,111 yards and 12 touchdowns, while recording 70 tackles and three interceptions on defense. He also ran track. He placed first at the Hudson County Championships with times of 10.86 seconds and 21.66 seconds in the 100 and 200 meters, respectively.

Considered a five-star recruit by ESPN.com, Fitzpatrick was listed as the No. 4 cornerback in the nation in 2015.

Fitzpatrick signed with Alabama at the 2015 National Signing Day, after being verbally committed for almost a year.

== College career ==
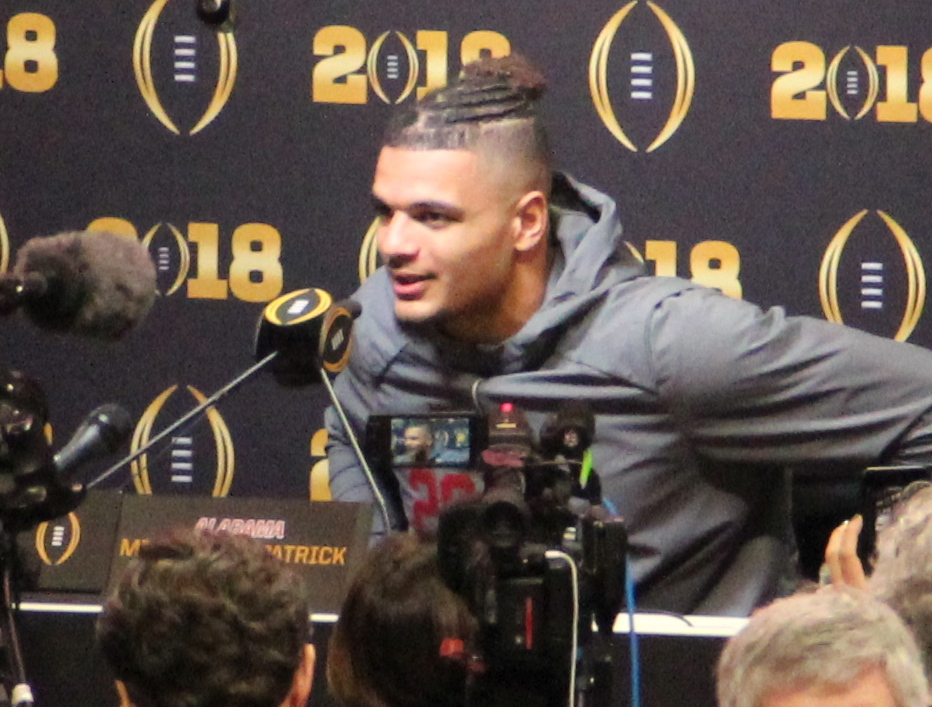
Fitzpatrick in January 2018

As a true freshman in 2015, Fitzpatrick started 10 of 14 games, missing one game due to injury. He recorded 45 total tackles, with three for a loss, two sacks, two interceptions (both returned for scores), 11 pass breakups, one quarterback hurry, and one punt return for a touchdown. He was part of the Alabama team that won the national championship over Clemson. He was named a Freshman All-American by The Sporting News after Alabama's championship season.

In his sophomore season in 2016, Fitzpatrick returned an interception 100 yards in a 49–30 win over then-16th ranked Arkansas. The interception broke the Alabama Crimson Tide record for longest interception returned for a touchdown. In that same game, he tied the Alabama records for most interceptions in a game (3), and career interceptions returned for a touchdown (4). In the 2016 SEC Championship Game against Florida, Fitzpatrick broke the Alabama all-time record for career interceptions returned for a touchdown (4). He was named as a consensus All-American for 2016.

In his junior season in 2017, Fitzpatrick recorded 60 total tackles, 1.5 sacks, one interception, one forced fumble, and seven passes defensed. He won his second national championship as the Crimson Tide defeated Georgia 26–23 in overtime. He won the Chuck Bednarik Award and Jim Thorpe Award. He earned consensus All-American honors for the second consecutive season.

== Professional career ==
=== Pre-draft ===
On January 11, 2018, Fitzpatrick announced his decision to forgo his remaining eligibility and enter the 2018 NFL draft. Fitzpatrick attended the NFL Scouting Combine in Indianapolis and completed the majority of combine drills, but opted to skip the short shuttle and three-cone drill. On March 7, 2018, Fitzpatrick participated at Alabama's pro day, but opted to stand on his combine numbers and only performed the short shuttle, three-cone drill, and positional drills.

External videos
- Minkah Fitzpatrick's NFL Combine Workout
- Minkah Fitzpatrick's 40-yard dash

Fitzpatrick attended pre-draft visits with the Chicago Bears, Tampa Bay Buccaneers, and San Francisco 49ers. His versatility allowed him to possibly play safety or cornerback as a professional, but Fitzpatrick expressed his desire to primarily play cornerback to multiple teams. NFL analyst Mel Kiper Jr. stated Fitzpatrick may experience a slide in the draft due to not having a defined role. At the conclusion of the pre-draft process, Fitzpatrick was projected to be a first-round pick by NFL draft experts and scouts. He was expected to be drafted within the top 15 selections. Fitzpatrick was ranked as the top cornerback prospect in the draft by DraftScout.com and was ranked as the top safety prospect by Sports Illustrated and NFL analyst Mike Mayock.

Pre-draft measurables
| Height | Weight | Arm length | Hand span | Wingspan | 40-yard dash | 10-yard split | 20-yard split | 20-yard shuttle | Three-cone drill | Vertical jump | Broad jump | Bench press |
|---|---|---|---|---|---|---|---|---|---|---|---|---|
| 6 ft 0 1/8 in (1.83 m) | 204 lb (93 kg) | 31 1/4 in (0.79 m) | 9 3/8 in (0.24 m) | 6 ft 3 1/8 in (1.91 m) | 4.46 s | 1.53 s | 2.58 s | 4.13 s | 6.73 s | 33.0 in (0.84 m) | 10 ft 1 in (3.07 m) | 14 reps |
All values from NFL Combine/Pro Day

=== Miami Dolphins (first stint) ===
==== 2018 season ====
The Miami Dolphins selected Fitzpatrick in the first round with the 11th overall pick in the 2018 NFL draft. Fitzpatrick was the first safety drafted in 2018. On June 1, 2018, the Dolphins signed Fitzpatrick to a fully guaranteed four-year, $16.4 million contract that includes a signing bonus of $10.04 million.

External videos
- Dolphins draft Fitzpatrick 11th overall
- NFL Draft Profile: Minkah Fitzpatrick

During training camp, Fitzpatrick competed against T. J. McDonald to be the starting free safety. He learned both safety positions and primarily ran with the second team. Head coach Adam Gase named Fitzpatrick the primary backup safety to begin the regular season, behind starters McDonald and Reshad Jones.

External videos
- Fitzpatrick grabs first career INT off Tom Brady

On September 9, 2018, Fitzpatrick made his professional regular season debut in the Miami Dolphins' home-opener against the Tennessee Titans in Week 1 and recorded six combined tackles (three solo) as well as breaking up a pass, in their 27–20 victory. In Week 3, he earned his first career start after Reshad Jones was declared inactive due to a shoulder injury and finished the Dolphins' 28–20 victory over the Oakland Raiders with ten combined tackles (two solo). On September 30, 2018, he collected ten combined tackles (four solo), two pass deflections, and made his first career interception off a throw by quarterback Tom Brady intended for wide receiver Phillip Dorsett during a 38–7 loss at the New England Patriots. On December 16, 2018, Fitzpatrick collected a season-high six solo tackles, deflected a pass, and intercepted a pass by Kirk Cousins that was intended for Stefon Diggs to return it for 50-yards to score his first career touchdown in the Dolphins' 41–17 loss at the Minnesota Vikings. He finished his rookie season in 2018 with 80 combined tackles (51 solo), two interceptions, nine passes defended, and a touchdown while appearing in all 16 games and starting in 11 of them.

On December 31, 2018, the Miami Dolphins fired head coach Adam Gase after they finished the 2018 NFL season with a 7–9 record and missed the playoffs.

==== 2019 season ====
Throughout training camp, head coach Brian Flores and defensive coordinator Patrick Graham began utilizing Fitzpatrick in multiple different roles in the secondary and chose to select Bobby McCain and Reshad Jones as the starting safeties with Fitzpatrick acting as the primary nickelback and backup safety.

On September 8, 2019, he started in the Miami Dolphins' home-opener at nickelback and recorded six combined tackles (four solo) in a 59–10 loss to the Baltimore Ravens. On September 13, 2019, it was reported Fitzpatrick was granted permission to have his agent seek a trade after it was requested. He was unhappy with his role under Brian Flores, as he was playing out of his natural position and played four different roles in the season-opener. In Week 2 against the Patriots, Fitzpatrick made six tackles and recovered a fumble by running back Sony Michel in their 43–0 loss.

=== Pittsburgh Steelers ===
==== 2019 season ====
On September 16, 2019, the Miami Dolphins traded Fitzpatrick, along with their 2020 fourth round (Kevin Dotson) and 2021 seventh round (Tre Norwood) draft picks, to the Pittsburgh Steelers, in exchange for the Steelers' 2020 first round (Austin Jackson), 2020 fifth round (Jason Strowbridge), and 2021 sixth round (eventually traded to the New York Jets) draft picks. Head coach Mike Tomlin immediately inserted him into the starting lineup with Fitzpatrick taking over the starting free safety role from Sean Davis.

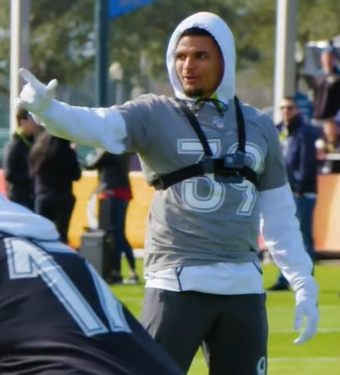
Fitzpatrick at the 2020 Pro Bowl

On September 22, 2019, Fitzpatrick made his debut with the Pittsburgh Steelers and recorded five combined tackles (four solo), a pass deflection, forced a fumble, and also had an interception on Jimmy Garoppolo after it was deflected by Joe Haden in their 24–20 loss to the San Francisco 49ers. On October 6, 2019, Fitzpatrick collected a season-high seven combined tackles (six solo) during a 26–23 loss against the Baltimore Ravens.In Week 8, he made two combined tackles (one solo), two pass deflections, and had two interceptions thrown by former teammate Ryan Fitzpatrick, setting a career-high in a 27–14 victory against the Miami Dolphins. On November 8, 2019, he collected seven tackles (four solo), one pass deflection, and intercepted a pass thrown by Brian Hoyer and returned it for a 96-yard touchdown in a 26–24 win against the Indianapolis Colts. Fitzpatrick's pick-six was the third longest interception return for a touchdown in franchise history. The following week, Fitzpatrick made four combined tackles (three solo), two pass deflections, one interception, and scored a touchdown after he had a 43-yard return after he recovered a fumble teammate Javon Hargrave caused while sacking Jared Goff during a 17–12 victory against the Los Angeles Rams. His interception happened during a pass attempt by Jared Goff with less than a minute left in the fourth quarter, sealing the Steelers' victory.

He started in all 14 games during his first season with the Pittsburgh Steelers and had 69 combined tackles (44 solo), five interceptions, nine pass deflections, three fumble recoveries, two forced fumbles, and two touchdowns while He was ranked 35th by his fellow players in the NFL Top 100 Players of 2020. He was voted to the 2020 Pro Bowl, marking his first Pro Bowl of his career.

==== 2020 season ====
Defensive coordinator Keith Butler retained Fitzpatrick as the starting free safety to begin the 2020 NFL season, alongside strong safety Terrell Edmunds. On October 18, 2020, Fitzpatrick made one tackle, a pass deflection, and intercepted a pass attempt by Baker Mayfield while covering tight end Harrison Bryant and returned it for a 38-yard touchdown as the Steelers defeated the Cleveland Browns 38–7 win. In Week 8 against the Ravens, Fitzpatrick forced a fumble on quarterback Lamar Jackson which was recovered by teammate Robert Spillane and later broke up a pass thrown by Jackson in the endzone with no time left on the clock to secure a 28–24 Steelers' victory. On November 22, 2020, Fitzpatrick made five combined tackles (two solo), two pass deflections, and set a season-high two interceptions from passes by Jake Luton in a 27–3 victory against the Jacksonville Jaguars in Week 11. His performance helped propel the Steelers to their first 10–0 start in franchise history.

He finished the 2020 NFL season with 79 combined tackles (60 solo), four interceptions, 11 passes defended, and one forced fumble. He was ranked 52nd by his fellow players on the NFL Top 100 Players of 2021. The Pittsburgh Steelers finished atop the AFC North with a 12–4 record, qualifying for a playoff berth. On January 17, 2021, Fitzpatrick started in his first postseason game of his career and produced six combined tackles (four solo) as the Steelers lost, 48–37, at the Cleveland Browns in the AFC Wildcard Game.

==== 2021 season ====
On April 27, 2021, the Pittsburgh Steelers chose to exercise the fifth-year option on Fitzpatrick's rookie contract, worth a guaranteed $10.61 million for the 2022 season. Head coach Mike Tomlin chose to remain with Fitzpatrick and Terrell Edmunds as the starting safety tandem to kickoff the regular season.

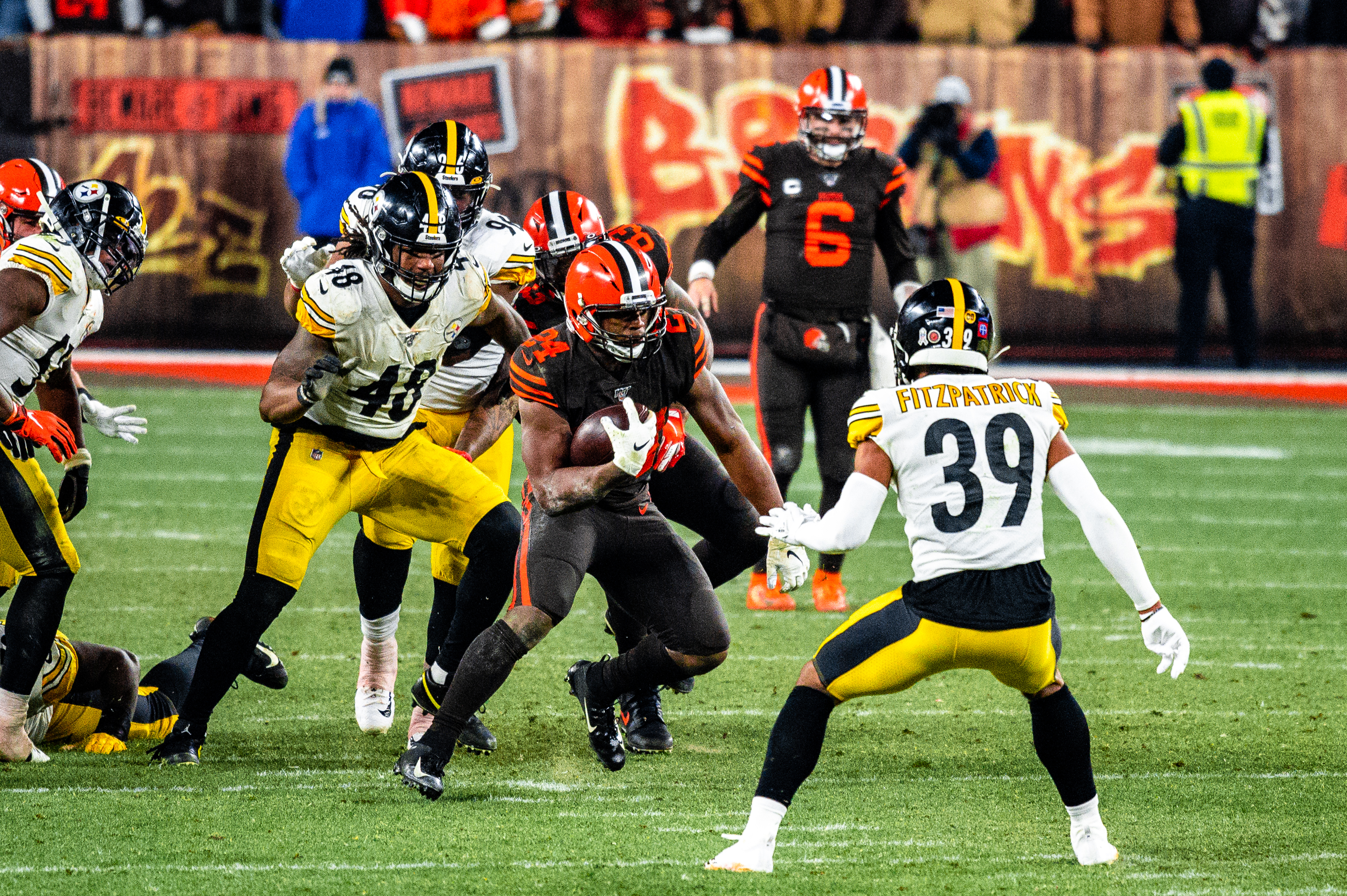
Fitzpatrick in a game against the Cleveland Browns

On November 15, Fitzpatrick tested positive for COVID-19 and was put on the Steelers' Reserve-COVID list. He was inactive for a Week 11 loss at the Los Angeles Chargers. On December 5, 2021, he made nine combined tackles (seven solo), a pass deflection, and had an interception on a throw by Lamar Jackson to tight end Mark Andrews during a 19–20 win against the Baltimore Ravens. In Week 15, Fitzpatrick racked up a career-high 14 combined tackles (12 solo) as the Steelers defeated the Tennessee Titans 19–13. He ended the 2021 NFL season with a total of 124 combined tackles (84 solo), two interceptions, seven passes defended, and one forced fumble in 16 games and 16 starts.

==== 2022 season ====
On June 15, 2022, the Pittsburgh Steelers signed Fitzpatrick to a four-year, $73.61 million contract that includes $36.00 million guaranteed upon signing and a signing bonus of $17.50 million. With an annual salary of $18.4 million, he became the highest paid safety in the NFL at the time, later being surpassed by Derwin James of the Los Angeles Chargers. Teryl Austin was promoted to defensive coordination due to the retirement of Keith Butler. Fitzpatrick and Terrell Edmunds returned as the starting safety duo under Teryl Austin.

On September 11, 2022, Fitzpatrick began the season with his best performance of the year, collecting a season-high 14 combined tackles (10 solo), made a pass deflection, and intercepted a pass on Joe Burrow's first pass attempt of the game, returning it 31-yards for a touchdown. He also blocked a game-winning extra point off of kicker Evan McPherson, as the Steelers won at the Cincinnati Bengals, 23–20, in overtime. His performance earned him AFC Defensive Player of the Week. In Week 4, he produced a total of eight combined tackles (five solo), a season-high with two pass deflections, and had an interception on a pass attempt by Zach Wilson in a 20–24 victory over the New York Jets. On November 12, 2022, Fitzpatrick complained of stomach pain and after consulting a doctor he was diagnosed with appendicitis and immediately underwent surgery. He was inactive the following day as the Steelers defeated the New Orleans Saints, 20–10. On January 1, 2023, Fitzpatrick made nine combined tackles (four solo), had a pass deflection, and had an interception on a throw by Lamar Jackson during a 16–13 victory at the Baltimore Ravens. He finished the 2022 NFL season with a total of 96 combined tackles (56 solo), 11 pass deflections, six interceptions, and a touchdown in 15 games and 15 starts. He was named as a first team All-Pro and voted to be a 2023 Pro Bowler. He was named the 2024 Bart Starr Award winner for his contributions on and off the field.

==== 2023 season ====
Head coach Mike Tomlin named Fitzpatrick and Keanu Neal the starting safeties to begin the regular season. In Week 4, he tied his season-high of 11 combined tackles (seven solo) during a 30–6 loss at the Houston Texans. On October 29, 2023, Fitzpatrick suffered a hamstring injury during a 20–10 loss to the Jacksonville Jaguars, sidelining him for four consecutive games (Weeks 9–12).

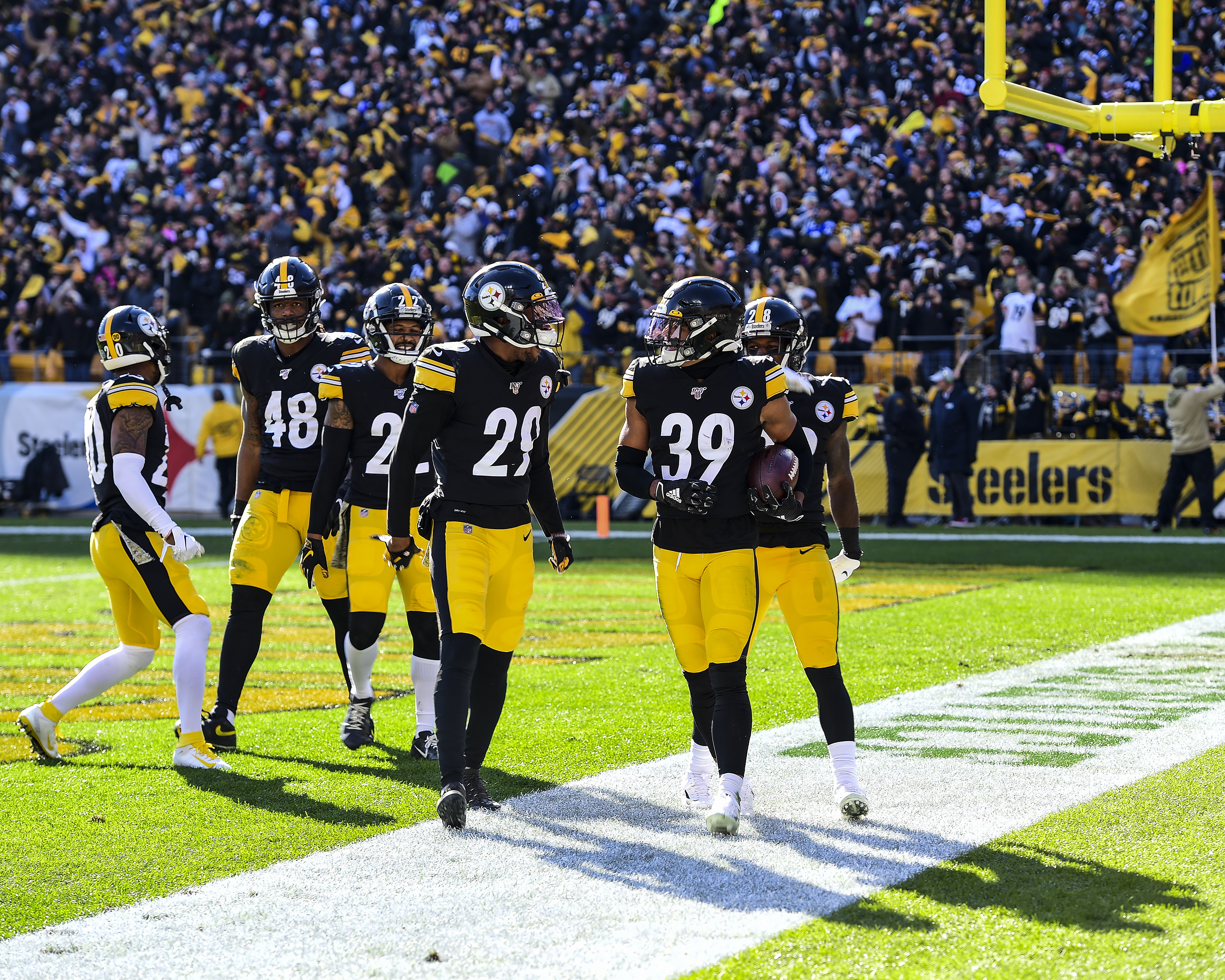
Fitzpatrick (39) during a game at Acrisure Stadium

On December 16, 2023, Fitzpatrick injured his left knee in the second quarter of a 30–13 loss to the Indianapolis Colts and was inactive for the last three games of the season (Weeks 16–18). He finished with 64 combined tackles (43 solo) and three pass deflections in ten games and ten starts. The Pittsburgh Steelers finished third in the AFC North with a 10–7 record to earn a Wildcard berth. On January 15, 2024, Fitzpatrick had ten combined tackles (five solo) during a 31–17 loss at the Buffalo Bills in the AFC Wildcard Game.

==== 2024 season ====
Head coach Mike Tomlin remained with Fitzpatrick as the starting free safety, but paired him with DeShon Elliott who was acquired in free agency. In Week 5, he collected a season-high ten combined tackles (eight solo) and had one pass deflection as the Steelers lost, 20–17 to the Dallas Cowboys. On December 21, 2024, he made six combined tackles (two solo), a season-high two pass deflections, and intercepted a pass attempt by Lamar Jackson to wide receiver Rashod Bateman in a 34–17 loss at the Baltimore Ravens. He finished the 2024 NFL season with a total of 96 combined tackles (64 solo), four pass deflections, one interception, and a forced fumble while starting all 17 games. Fitzpatrick was voted to the 2025 Pro Bowl, along with T. J. Watt, Cameron Heyward, and Chris Boswell.

=== Miami Dolphins (second stint) ===
On June 30, 2025, Fitzpatrick, along with a 2027 fifth-round pick, was traded back to the Miami Dolphins in exchange for Jalen Ramsey, Jonnu Smith, and a 2027 seventh-round pick. In Week 13 against the New Orleans Saints, Fitzpatrick intercepted a Tyler Shough two-point attempt late in the fourth quarter, returning it 93 yards for two points and helping seal a 21–17 victory.

=== New York Jets ===
On March 11, 2026, Fitzpatrick was traded to the New York Jets in exchange for a 2026 seventh-round pick (No. 238: Max Llewellyn). Immediately after, he inked a three-year, $40 million contract extension with the Jets.

In Week 4 against the Bears, Fitzpatrick ended the Jets' 637-day streak without an interception when he picked off Tyson Bagent. It was the first interception by a Jets defender since Ashtyn Davis had two in the final game of the 2024 season.

== Career statistics ==
Legend
| | Led the league |
| **Bold** | Career high |

=== Regular season ===
| Year | Team | Games | | Tackles | | | | | Interceptions | | | | | | Fumbles | | | |
| Year | Team | GP | GS | Cmb | Solo | Ast | Sck | TFL | PD | Int | Yds | Avg | Lng | TD | FF | FR | Yds | TD |
|---|---|---|---|---|---|---|---|---|---|---|---|---|---|---|---|---|---|---|
| 2018 | MIA | 16 | 11 | 80 | 51 | 29 | 0.0 | 2 | 9 | 2 | 64 | **32.0** | 50T | **1** | 0 | 0 | 0 | 0 |
| 2019 | MIA | 2 | 2 | 12 | 8 | 4 | 0.0 | 0 | 0 | 0 | 0 | 0.0 | 0 | 0 | **1** | 1 | 0 | 0 |
| 2019 | PIT | 14 | 14 | 57 | 36 | 21 | 0.0 | 1 | 9 | 5 | **130** | 26.0 | **96T** | **1** | **1** | **2** | **79** | **1** |
| 2020 | PIT | 16 | 16 | 79 | 60 | 19 | 0.0 | 1 | **11** | 4 | 77 | 19.3 | 37 | **1** | **1** | 1 | -1 | 0 |
| 2021 | PIT | 16 | 16 | **124** | **84** | **40** | 0.0 | 1 | 7 | 2 | 18 | 9.0 | 18 | 0 | **1** | 1 | -1 | 0 |
| 2022 | PIT | 15 | 15 | 96 | 56 | **40** | 0.0 | 1 | **11** | **6** | 94 | 15.7 | 34 | **1** | 0 | 0 | 0 | 0 |
| 2023 | PIT | 10 | 10 | 64 | 43 | 21 | 0.0 | 1 | 3 | 0 | 0 | 0.0 | 0 | 0 | 0 | 0 | 0 | 0 |
| 2024 | PIT | 17 | 17 | 96 | 62 | 34 | 0.0 | 1 | 4 | 1 | 25 | 25.0 | 25 | 0 | **1** | 0 | 0 | 0 |
| 2025 | MIA | 14 | 14 | 82 | 59 | 23 | **1.0** | **4** | 6 | 1 | 7 | 7.0 | 7 | 0 | **1** | **2** | 0 | 0 |
| 2026 | NYJ | 8 | 8 | 55 | 27 | 28 | 0.0 | 0 | 3 | 1 | 27 | 27.0 | 27 | 0 | 0 | 1 | 0 | 0 |
| Career | | 128 | 123 | 745 | 486 | 259 | 1.0 | 12 | 63 | 22 | 442 | 20.1 | 96T | 4 | 6 | 8 | 97 | 1 |

=== Postseason ===
| Year | Team | Games | | Tackles | | | | | Interceptions | | | | | | Fumbles | | | |
| Year | Team | GP | GS | Cmb | Solo | Ast | Sck | TFL | PD | Int | Yds | Avg | Lng | TD | FF | FR | Yds | TD |
|---|---|---|---|---|---|---|---|---|---|---|---|---|---|---|---|---|---|---|
| 2020 | PIT | 1 | 1 | 6 | 4 | 2 | 0.0 | 0 | 0 | 0 | 0 | 0.0 | 0 | 0 | 0 | 0 | 0 | 0 |
| 2021 | PIT | 1 | 1 | 6 | **5** | 1 | 0.0 | 0 | 0 | 0 | 0 | 0.0 | 0 | 0 | 0 | 0 | 0 | 0 |
| 2023 | PIT | 1 | 1 | **10** | **5** | **5** | 0.0 | **1** | 0 | 0 | 0 | 0.0 | 0 | 0 | 0 | 0 | 0 | 0 |
| 2024 | PIT | 1 | 1 | 9 | **5** | 4 | 0.0 | 0 | 0 | 0 | 0 | 0.0 | 0 | 0 | 0 | 0 | 0 | 0 |
| Career | | 4 | 4 | 31 | 19 | 12 | 0.0 | 1 | 0 | 0 | 0 | 0.0 | 0 | 0 | 0 | 0 | 0 | 0 |

=== College ===
Legend
| CFP national champion |

| Season | Team | GP | Tackles | | | | Interceptions | | | | |
| Season | Team | GP | Cmb | Solo | Ast | Sck | Int | Yds | Avg | TD | PD |
|---|---|---|---|---|---|---|---|---|---|---|---|
| 2015 | Alabama | 14 | 45 | 30 | 15 | **2.0** | 2 | 88 | **44.0** | **2** | **10** |
| 2016 | Alabama | 15 | **66** | **42** | **24** | 1.5 | **6** | **186** | 31.0 | **2** | 7 |
| 2017 | Alabama | 13 | 60 | 38 | 22 | 1.5 | 1 | 0 | 0.0 | 0 | 7 |
| Career | | 42 | 171 | 110 | 61 | 5.0 | 9 | 274 | 30.4 | 4 | 24 |

== Awards and honors ==
NFL

- 3× First-team All-Pro (2019, 2020, 2022)
- 5× Pro Bowl (2019, 2020, 2022–2024)
- NFL interceptions co-leader (2022)
- Bart Starr Award (2024)
- 4× NFL Top 100 — 35th (2020), 52nd (2021), 18th (2023), 79th (2024)
- AFC Defensive Player of the Week (Week 1, 2022)

College

- 2× CFP national champion (2015, 2017)
- Chuck Bednarik Award (2017)
- Jim Thorpe Award (2017)
- Unanimous All-American (2017)
- Consensus All-American (2016)
- 2× First-team All-SEC (2016, 2017)

== Personal life ==
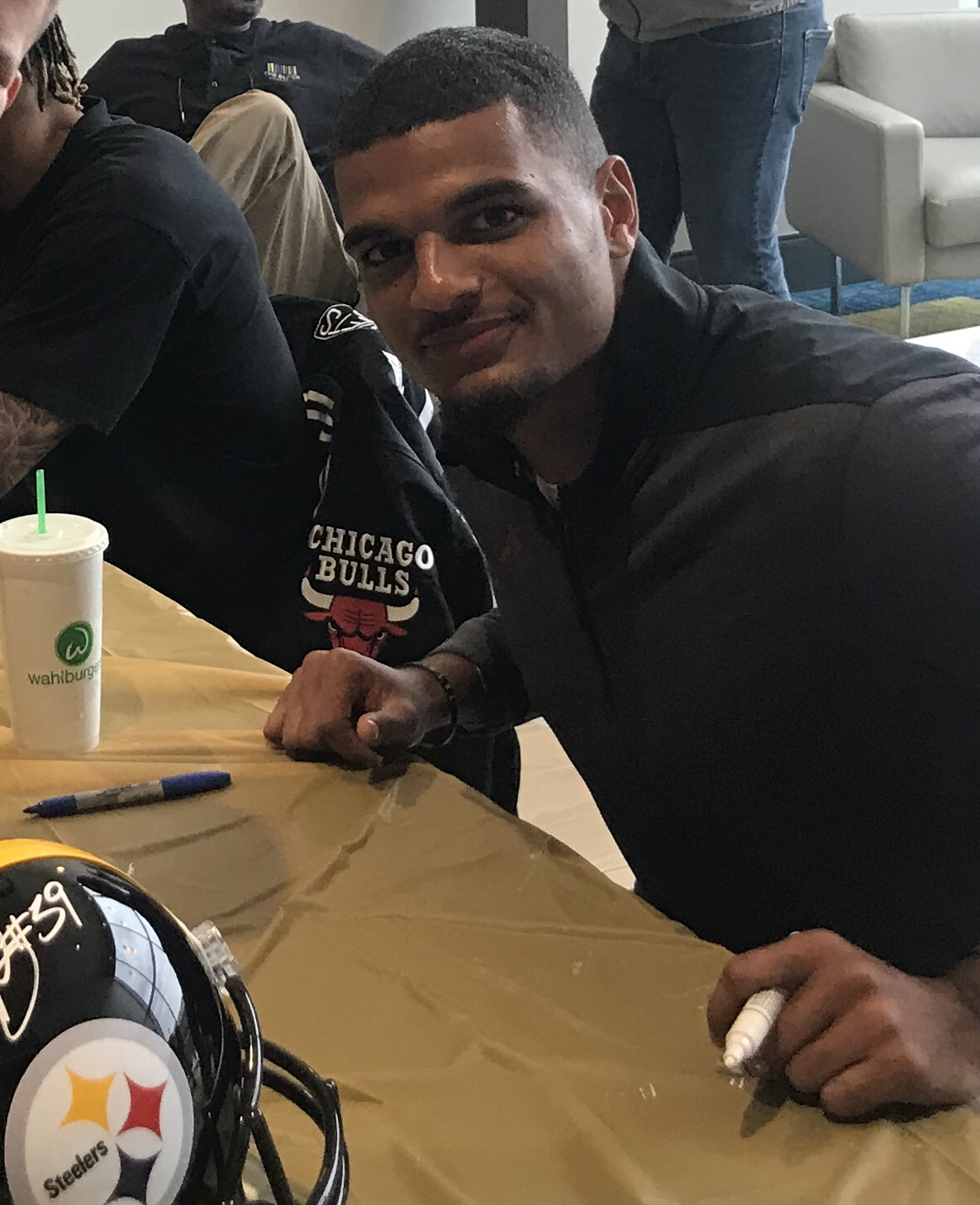
Fitzpatrick at a Steelers signing event in 2019.

Fitzpatrick was born to Melissa and Minkah Fitzpatrick Sr. in Old Bridge, New Jersey. Growing up, Fitzpatrick faced financial struggles, particularly in 2011 when Hurricane Irene severely damaged his family's home. His father, who had been laid off from his job as a truck mechanic, took on multiple jobs to support the family, while Minkah helped rebuild their home. These early hardships instilled in him a strong sense of discipline, faith, and perseverance. Fitzpatrick, who was raised in a Christian household, has often spoken about the importance of his faith, citing Bible verses such as Micah 7:8, which he has said helped guide him through difficult times. He has remained deeply committed to his family and faith during his career, often crediting them as the foundation of his success both on and off the field.

Fitzpatrick has four siblings: Justice, Promise, Destiny, and Devine. His younger brother, Justice Fitzpatrick, is a high school football player and a top recruit for the class of 2026. In December 2025, Justice signed to play college football at The University of Georgia.

Fitzpatrick has been in a long-term relationship with Maya Stokes, a fashion model represented by Docherty Talent Agency in Pittsburgh. The couple maintains a private life, with Maya keeping a minimal online presence. On October 7, 2024, Fitzpatrick and Stokes welcomed their first child, a son named Uzai Fitzpatrick, at the Allegheny Health Network's labor and delivery unit at Wexford Hospital. The delivery was overseen by Dr. Ronald Cypher, the Pittsburgh Steelers’ preferred gynecologist. Uzai was born weighing 6 pounds, 8 ounces.
