= 2020 Pittsburgh Steelers season =

88th season in franchise history

- Owner: The Rooney Family
- General manager: Kevin Colbert
- Head coach: Mike Tomlin
- Offensive coordinator: Randy Fichtner
- Defensive coordinator: Keith Butler
- Home stadium: Heinz Field

Results
- Record: 12–4
- Division place: 1st AFC North
- Playoffs: Lost Wild Card Playoffs (vs. Browns) 37–48
- All-Pros: 3: OLB T. J. Watt (1st team); S Minkah Fitzpatrick (1st team); DT Cameron Heyward (2nd team)
- Pro Bowlers: 5: G David DeCastro; C Maurkice Pouncey; DT Cameron Heyward; OLB T. J. Watt; FS Minkah Fitzpatrick
- Team MVP: T. J. Watt
- Team ROY: Chase Claypool

Uniform
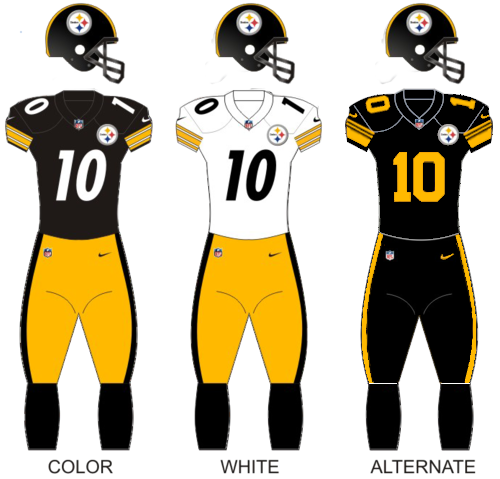

The 2020 season was the Pittsburgh Steelers' 88th in the National Football League (NFL), their 20th playing home games at Heinz Field, their 21st under general manager Kevin Colbert, and their 14th under head coach Mike Tomlin. The team vastly improved on their 8–8 record from 2019 beginning the season 11–0, a franchise-best. They became the first NFL team to do so since the Carolina Panthers in the 2015 season. However, that streak was broken after a Week 13 loss to the Washington Football Team; the loss was the first of four in a five-game span to close the regular season. The Steelers clinched a playoff berth for the first time since 2017 after the Miami Dolphins' Week 14 loss to the Kansas City Chiefs and clinched their first AFC North title since 2017 with a Week 16 victory over the Indianapolis Colts.

The season marked the return of Ben Roethlisberger, who was sidelined for 14 games the season prior. However, despite entering Week 13 at 11–0, the Steelers collapsed and lost four of their last five games to finish 12–4 and join the 1969 Los Angeles Rams as the only teams in NFL history to go 11–0 and lose 3 consecutive games afterwards. In the playoffs, the collapse continued as the Steelers faced the Cleveland Browns in the Wild Card round, allowing Cleveland to break a substantial playoff drought by defeating the Steelers, 48–37.

The Steelers swept the Ravens for the first time in three seasons. Their 11–0 start marked the longest the Steelers have gone before their first loss in a season in franchise history. They also went undefeated against the AFC South for the first time in six seasons.

Because the New England Patriots went 7–9, their first losing season in 20 years, the Steelers ended the year as the only team from 2004 to 2020 that didn't have a single losing season. As of the 2025 NFL season, the streak is still ongoing. This was also the first season since 2014 in which the Steelers did not face the Patriots.

== Transactions ==
The Steelers have been involved in the following transactions during the 2020 season:

=== Trades ===
Player	Acquired from	Traded to	Date	Trade terms
DE Chris Wormley	Baltimore Ravens		March 20	2021 7th round pick to Pittsburgh; 2021 5th round pick to Baltimore
ILB Avery Williamson	New York Jets		November 1	2022 7th round pick to Pittsburgh; 2022 5th round pick to New York

=== Free agent signings ===
==== Lost ====
Player	Lost to	Date	Contract terms
DT Javon Hargrave	Philadelphia Eagles	March 21	3 years / $39 million
C B. J. Finney	Seattle Seahawks	March 23	2 years / $8 million
FS Sean Davis	Washington Football Team	March 23	1 years / $4 million
CB Artie Burns	Chicago Bears	March 26	1 year / $1.05 million
ILB Tyler Matakevich	Buffalo Bills	March 30	2 years / $7.1 million
TE Nick Vannett	Denver Broncos	April 2	2 years / $5.7 million

==== Acquired ====
Player	Acquired from	Date	Contract terms
FB Derek Watt	Los Angeles Chargers	March 26	3 years / $9.75 million
G Stefen Wisniewski	Kansas City Chiefs	March 26	2 years / $2.85 million
TE Eric Ebron	Indianapolis Colts	March 30	2 years / $12 million

=== Cuts ===
Position	Player	Date
ILB	Mark Barron	March 16
OLB	Anthony Chickillo	March 16
FB	Roosevelt Nix	March 18

== Draft ==
2020 Pittsburgh Steelers Draft
Round	Selection	Player	Position	College	Notes
2	49	Chase Claypool	WR	Notre Dame	
3	102	Alex Highsmith	OLB	Charlotte	Compensatory pick
4	124	Anthony McFarland Jr.	RB	Maryland	
4	135	Kevin Dotson	G	Louisiana	From Miami
6	198	Antoine Brooks	S	Maryland	
7	232	Carlos Davis	DT	Nebraska	

Notes

- Pittsburgh traded 2020 first and fifth round selections and a 2021 sixth round selection to Miami in exchange for safety Minkah Fitzpatrick and a 2020 fourth round selection.
- Pittsburgh traded a third-round selection along with 2019 first- and second-round selections to Denver in exchange for Denver's 2019 first-round selection.
- Jacksonville traded a fifth-round selection to Pittsburgh in exchange for quarterback Joshua Dobbs.
- Pittsburgh traded a fifth-round selection to Seattle in exchange for tight end Nick Vannett.

== Staff ==
2020 Pittsburgh Steelers staff
Front office: President – Art Rooney II; Vice president – Art Rooney Jr.; Vice president & general manager – Kevin Colbert; Vice president of football and business administration – Omar Khan; Player personnel coordinator – Dan Rooney Jr.; College scouting coordinator – Phil Kreidler; Pro scouting coordinator – Brandon Hunt; Head coaches: Head coach – Mike Tomlin; Assistant head coach – John Mitchell; Offensive coaches: Offensive coordinator – Randy Fichtner; Quarterbacks – Matt Canada; Running backs – Eddie Faulkner; Wide receivers – Ike Hilliard; Assistant wide receivers – Blaine Stewart; Tight ends – James Daniel; Offensive line – Shaun Sarrett; Assistant offensive line – Adrian Klemm	Defensive coaches: Defensive coordinator – Keith Butler; Defensive line – Karl Dunbar; Assistant Outside Linebackers – Denzel Martin; Inside linebackers – Jerry Olsavsky; Defensive backs – Tom Bradley; Senior defensive assistant/secondary – Teryl Austin; Special teams coaches: Special teams coordinator – Danny Smith; Coaching Assistant – Matt Symmes; Strength and conditioning: Conditioning coordinator – Garrett Giemont

== Final roster ==
2020 Pittsburgh Steelers roster
Quarterbacks (QB): 5 Joshua Dobbs; 7 Ben Roethlisberger; 2 Mason Rudolph; Running backs (RB): 30 James Conner; 26 Anthony McFarland Jr.; 38 Jaylen Samuels; 24 Benny Snell; 44 Derek Watt FB; Wide receivers (WR): 11 Chase Claypool; 18 Diontae Johnson; 14 Ray-Ray McCloud RS; 19 JuJu Smith-Schuster; 13 James Washington; Tight ends (TE): 85 Eric Ebron; 89 Vance McDonald; 87 Kevin Rader	Offensive linemen (OL): 66 David DeCastro G; 69 Kevin Dotson G; 71 Matt Feiler G; 60 J. C. Hassenauer C; 65 Jerald Hawkins T; 64 Danny Isidora G; 76 Chukwuma Okorafor T; 53 Maurkice Pouncey C; 78 Alejandro Villanueva T; Defensive linemen (DL): 94 Tyson Alualu NT; 96 Isaiah Buggs NT; 73 Carlos Davis DE; 97 Cameron Heyward DE; 99 Henry Mondeaux DE; 91 Stephon Tuitt DE; 95 Chris Wormley DE	Linebackers (LB): 92 Ola Adeniyi OLB; 27 Marcus Allen ILB; 45 Jayrone Elliott OLB; 56 Alex Highsmith OLB; 49 Cassius Marsh OLB; 41 Robert Spillane ILB; 90 T. J. Watt OLB; 98 Vince Williams ILB; 51 Avery Williamson ILB; Defensive backs (DB): 25 Antoine Brooks SS; 37 Jordan Dangerfield SS; 21 Sean Davis FS; 34 Terrell Edmunds SS; 39 Minkah Fitzpatrick FS; 28 Mike Hilton CB; 31 Justin Layne CB; 22 Steven Nelson CB; 42 James Pierre CB; 20 Cameron Sutton CB; Special teams (ST): 4 Jordan Berry P; 9 Chris Boswell K; 57 Kameron Canaday LS	Practice squad: 35 John Battle FS; 17 Deon Cain WR; 93 Demarcus Christmas DT; 68 Anthony Coyle T; 6 Devlin Hodges QB; 83 Anthony Johnson WR; 88 Charles Jones TE; 74 Jarron Jones T (PS/I); 77 John Leglue T; 29 Wendell Smallwood RB; 67 Calvin Taylor DE; 8 Corliss Waitman P; 62 Brandon Walton T; 15 Cody White WR; 46 Trevor Williams CB; 16 Matthew Wright K; Reserve: 72 Zach Banner T (IR); 55 Devin Bush Jr. ILB (IR); 48 Bud Dupree OLB (IR); 33 Trey Edmunds RB (IR); 81 Zach Gentry TE (IR); 54 Ulysees Gilbert ILB (IR); 23 Joe Haden CB (COVID-19); Rookies in italics 53 active, 7 reserve, 16 practice squad (1 exempt)

== Preseason ==
The Steelers would have played the Dallas Cowboys in the Pro Football Hall of Fame Game on August 6, at Tom Benson Hall of Fame Stadium in Canton, Ohio, and the Steelers were to be represented by former head coach Bill Cowher and safeties Troy Polamalu and Donnie Shell. However, the game, the annual Hall of Fame enshrinement and the remainder of the preseason were later cancelled due to the COVID-19 pandemic, and the Hall of Fame game between the Steelers and Cowboys was rescheduled for 2021.

Week	Date	Opponent	Venue	Result
HOF	August 6	vs. Dallas Cowboys	Tom Benson Hall of Fame Stadium	Cancelled due to the COVID-19 pandemic
1	August 14	Tampa Bay Buccaneers	Heinz Field	Cancelled due to the COVID-19 pandemic
2	August 23	New Orleans Saints	Heinz Field	Cancelled due to the COVID-19 pandemic
3	August 28	at New York Jets	MetLife Stadium	Cancelled due to the COVID-19 pandemic
4	September 3	at Carolina Panthers	Bank of America Stadium	Cancelled due to the COVID-19 pandemic

== Regular season ==
=== Schedule ===
The Steelers' 2020 schedule was announced on May 7.

Week	Date	Opponent	Result	Record	Venue	Recap
1	September 14	at New York Giants	**W** 26–16	1–0	MetLife Stadium	Recap
2	September 20	Denver Broncos	**W** 26–21	2–0	Heinz Field	Recap
3	September 27	Houston Texans	**W** 28–21	3–0	Heinz Field	Recap
4	Bye (Note: Due to a COVID-19 outbreak within the Tennessee Titans' organization, the Steelers–Titans game, originally scheduled during Week 4 (October 4), was moved to Week 7 (October 25), which originally would have been the Titans' bye week. The Steelers–Ravens game in Baltimore, originally scheduled during Week 7, was moved to Week 8 (November 1), which was the original bye week for both teams.)					
5	October 11	Philadelphia Eagles	**W** 38–29	4–0	Heinz Field	Recap
6	October 18	**Cleveland Browns**	**W** 38–7	5–0	Heinz Field	Recap
7	October 25	at Tennessee Titans	**W** 27–24	6–0	Nissan Stadium	Recap
8	November 1	at **Baltimore Ravens**	**W** 28–24	7–0	M&T Bank Stadium	Recap
9	November 8	at Dallas Cowboys	**W** 24–19	8–0	AT&T Stadium	Recap
10	November 15	**Cincinnati Bengals**	**W** 36–10	9–0	Heinz Field	Recap
11	November 22	at Jacksonville Jaguars	**W** 27–3	10–0	TIAA Bank Field	Recap
12 (Note: The Steelers' home game vs. the Baltimore Ravens, originally scheduled for November 26 on Thanksgiving, was delayed three times: first to November 29, then to December 1, and then finally to December 2. The scheduling change was made due to a COVID-19 outbreak within the Ravens' organization as at least twelve players were tested positive. This also caused the Steelers game against the Washington Football Team to be moved from December 6 to December 7.)	December 2	**Baltimore Ravens**	**W** 19–14	11–0	Heinz Field	Recap
13	December 7	Washington Football Team	**L** 17–23	11–1	Heinz Field	Recap
14	December 13	at Buffalo Bills	**L** 15–26	11–2	Bills Stadium	Recap
15	December 21	at **Cincinnati Bengals**	**L** 17–27	11–3	Paul Brown Stadium	Recap
16	December 27	Indianapolis Colts	**W** 28–24	12–3	Heinz Field	Recap
17	January 3	at **Cleveland Browns**	**L** 22–24	12–4	FirstEnergy Stadium	Recap

Note: Intra-division opponents are in bold text.

=== Game summaries ===
==== Week 1: at New York Giants ====
Week One: Pittsburgh Steelers at New York Giants – Game summary

Quarter	1	2	3	4	Total
**Steelers**	3	13	0	10	**26**
Giants	3	7	0	6	**16**

at MetLife Stadium, East Rutherford, New Jersey

- Date: September 14
- Game time: 7:10 p.m. EDT
- Game weather: Clear, 71 °F (22 °C)
- Game attendance: 0
- Referee: Craig Wrolstad
- TV announcers (ESPN): Chris Fowler, Kirk Herbstreit and Maria Taylor
- Recap, Game Book

Game information

**First quarter**

- NYG – Graham Gano 21-yard field goal, 10:34. Giants 3–0. **Drive: 4 plays, 1 yard, 0:50.**
- PIT – Chris Boswell 41-yard field goal, 0:49. Tied 3–3. **Drive: 13 plays, 59 yards, 6:11.**

**Second quarter**

- NYG – Darius Slayton 41-yard pass from Daniel Jones (Graham Gano kick), 13:45. Giants 10–3. **Drive: 6 plays, 75 yards, 2:04.**
- PIT – JuJu Smith-Schuster 10-yard pass from Ben Roethlisberger (Chris Boswell PAT failed), 9:01. Giants 10–9. **Drive: 6 plays, 36 yards, 3:34.**
- PIT – James Washington 13-yard pass from Ben Roethlisberger (Chris Boswell kick), 0:07. Steelers 16–10. **Drive: 8 plays, 78 yards, 1:25.**

**Third quarter**

- No scoring plays.

**Fourth quarter**

- PIT – Chris Boswell 36-yard field goal, 14:19. Steelers 19–10. **Drive: 9 plays, 62 yards, 3:58.**
- PIT – JuJu Smith-Schuster 8-yard pass from Ben Roethlisberger (Chris Boswell kick), 5:23. Steelers 26–10. **Drive: 11 plays, 75 yards, 7:00.**
- NYG – Darius Slayton 7-yard pass from Daniel Jones (Two-point pass conversion failed), 1:52. Steelers 26–16. **Drive: 13 plays, 75 yards, 3:31.**

**Top passers**

- PIT – Ben Roethlisberger – 21/32, 229 yards, 3 TD
- NYG – Daniel Jones – 26/41, 279 yards, 2 TD, 2 INT

**Top rushers**

- PIT – Benny Snell – 19 rushes, 113 yards
- NYG – Daniel Jones – 4 rushes, 22 yards

**Top receivers**

- PIT – JuJu Smith-Schuster – 6 receptions, 69 yards, 2 TD
- NYG – Darius Slayton – 6 receptions, 102 yards, 2 TD

The Steelers started their season on the road against the Giants on Monday Night Football. In the first quarter, the Giants scored first when Graham Gano kicked a 21-yard field goal to make it 3–0. Later on in the quarter, Chris Boswell would tie the game at 3–3 with a 41-yard field goal. The Giants took the lead in the second quarter when Daniel Jones found Darius Slayton on a 41-yard TD pass to make it 10–3. The Steelers responded when Ben Roethlisberger found JuJu Smith-Schuster on a 10-yard TD pass (with a failed PAT) to make the score 10–9. Finally, the Steelers took the lead before halftime when Roethlisberger connected with James Washington on a 13-yard TD pass to make the score 16–10. After a scoreless third quarter, the Steelers got back to work when Boswell kicked a 36-yard field goal to make it 19–10. This was followed up by Roethlisberger connecting with Smith-Schuster again on an 8-yard TD pass to make it 26–10. Finally, the Giants wrapped up the scoring of the game when Jones and Slayton connected again for a 7-yard TD pass to make the final score 26–16.

With the win, the Steelers started their season 1–0. They won their regular season-opening game for the first time since 2017.

In Roethlisberger's first game in 364 days, he went 21 of 32 for 229 yards and 3 touchdown passes, giving him a 117.8 passer rating.

The win was the third straight time that they have beaten the Giants.

==== Week 2: vs. Denver Broncos ====
Week Two: Denver Broncos at Pittsburgh Steelers – Game summary

Quarter	1	2	3	4	Total
Broncos	0	3	11	7	**21**
**Steelers**	7	10	0	9	**26**

at Heinz Field, Pittsburgh, Pennsylvania

- Date: September 20
- Game time: 1:00 pm. EDT
- Game weather: Sunny, 64 °F (18 °C)
- Game attendance: 0
- Referee: Adrian Hill
- TV announcers (CBS): Greg Gumbel, Rich Gannon and Jay Feely
- Recap, Game Book

Game information

**First quarter**

- PIT – James Conner 2-yard run, 4:23. Steelers 7–0. **Drive: 9 plays, 59 yards, 3:19.**

**Second quarter**

- DEN – Brandon McManus 49-yard field goal, 12:07. Steelers 7–3. **Drive: 5 plays, 5 yards, 2:53.**
- PIT – Chase Claypool 84-yard pass from Ben Roethlisberger (Chris Boswell kick), 6:23. Steelers 14–3. **Drive: 1 play, 84 yards, 0:11.**
- PIT – Chris Boswell 21-yard field goal, 0:39. Steelers 17–3. **Drive: 4 plays, 8 yards, 1:19.**

**Third quarter**

- DEN – Brandon McManus 28-yard field goal, 8:00. Steelers 17–6. **Drive: 10 plays, 31 yards, 3:50.**
- DEN – Noah Fant 20-yard pass from Jeff Driskel (Jeff Driskel–Noah Fant pass), 1:07. Steelers 17–14. **Drive: 6 plays, 65 yards, 2:47.**

**Fourth quarter**

- PIT – Diontae Johnson 28-yard pass from Ben Roethlisberger (Chris Boswell kick), 11:26. Steelers 24–14. **Drive: 9 plays, 75 yards, 4:41.**
- PIT – Derek Watt tackled Sam Martin for a safety, 10:01. Steelers 26–14.
- DEN – Melvin Gordon III 16-yard pass from Jeff Driskel (Brandon McManus kick), 7:43. Steelers 26–21. **Drive: 6 plays, 54 yards, 1:58.**

**Top passers**

- DEN – Jeff Driskel – 18/34, 256 yards, 2 TD, INT
- PIT – Ben Roethlisberger – 29/41, 311 yards, 2 TD, INT

**Top rushers**

- DEN – Melvin Gordon III – 19 rushes, 70 yards
- PIT – James Conner – 16 rushes, 106 yards, TD

**Top receivers**

- DEN – Courtland Sutton – 3 receptions, 66 yards
- PIT – Diontae Johnson – 8 receptions, 92 yards, TD

After a road win on Monday Night Football, the Steelers headed home for a game against the Broncos. In the first quarter, the Steelers made it 7–0 after James Conner ran for a 2-yard TD for the only score of the period. In the second quarter, the Broncos managed to get on the board when Brandon McManus kicked a 49-yard field goal to make it 7–3. Ben Roethlisberger then found rookie WR Chase Claypool on an 84-yard TD pass to make it 14–3. Chris Boswell then put the Steelers up by a couple touchdowns at halftime with a 21-yard field goal to make it 17–3.

After the break, the Broncos eventually came within 3 when McManus kicked a 28-yard field goal to make it 17–6. Backup QB Jeff Driskel then found Noah Fant on a 20-yard TD pass (with a successful 2-point conversion) to make it 17–14. In the fourth quarter, the Steelers responded when Roethlisberger found Diontae Johnson on a 28-yard TD pass to make it 24–14. This would be followed on the next Broncos drive by Derek Watt tackling Broncos punter Sam Martin in the end zone for a safety to make it 26–14. Driskel then found Melvin Gordon III on a 16-yard TD pass to get the Broncos within 5, 26–21. The Broncos were able to drive late, getting to the Steelers' 15-yard line at the two-minute warning. However, the Steelers forced an incompletion on 3rd and 2, and then Terrell Edmunds sacked Driskel on 4th down, giving the ball back to the Steelers. On the second play of the next Steelers' drive, Conner carried for 59 yards, sealing the victory.

With the win, the Steelers improved to 2–0 for the first time since 2017. In addition, the quarterback/head coach duo of Roethlisberger and Tomlin won their 117th regular season game together, moving to third all-time.

==== Week 3: vs. Houston Texans ====
Week Three: Houston Texans at Pittsburgh Steelers – Game summary

Quarter	1	2	3	4	Total
Texans	7	14	0	0	**21**
**Steelers**	3	14	3	8	**28**

at Heinz Field, Pittsburgh, Pennsylvania

- Date: September 27
- Game time: 1:00 pm. EDT
- Game weather: Mostly cloudy, 79 °F (26 °C)
- Game attendance: 0
- Referee: Shawn Smith
- TV announcers (CBS): Ian Eagle, Charles Davis and Evan Washburn
- Recap, Game Book

Game information

**First quarter**

- PIT – Chris Boswell 33-yard field goal, 8:55. Steelers 3–0. **Drive: 11 plays, 63 yards, 5:11.**
- HOU – Randall Cobb 28-yard pass from Deshaun Watson (Kaʻimi Fairbairn kick), 6:01. Texans 7–3. **Drive: 7 plays, 74 yards, 2:54.**

**Second quarter**

- HOU – David Johnson 28-yard run (Kaʻimi Fairbairn kick), 11:32. Texans 14–3. **Drive: 9 plays, 54 yards, 3:58.**
- PIT – Eric Ebron 10-yard pass from Ben Roethlisberger (Chris Boswell kick), 5:05. Texans 14–10. **Drive: 12 plays, 75 yards, 6:27.**
- PIT – JuJu Smith-Schuster 26-yard pass from Ben Roethlisberger (Chris Boswell kick), 1:14. Steelers 17–14. **Drive: 7 plays, 63 yards, 1:24.**
- HOU – Will Fuller 14-yard pass from Deshaun Watson (Kaʻimi Fairbairn kick), 0:24. Texans 21–17. **Drive: 5 plays, 75 yards, 0:50.**

**Third quarter**

- PIT – Chris Boswell 26-yard field goal, 9:54. Texans 21–20. **Drive: 12 plays, 62 yards, 5:06.**

**Fourth quarter**

- PIT – James Conner 12-yard run (Ben Roethlisberger-JuJu Smith-Schuster pass), 6:24. Steelers 28–21. **Drive: 12 plays, 79 yards, 7:03.**

**Top passers**

- HOU – Deshaun Watson – 19/27, 264 yards, 2 TD, INT
- PIT – Ben Roethlisberger – 23/36, 237 yards, 2 TD

**Top rushers**

- HOU – David Johnson – 13 rushes, 23 yards, TD
- PIT – James Conner – 18 rushes, 109 yards, TD

**Top receivers**

- HOU – Randall Cobb – 4 receptions, 95 yards, TD
- PIT – Eric Ebron – 5 receptions, 52 yards, TD

After a tough win at home, the Steelers stayed home for a game against the Texans, known as the "Watt Bowl" for T. J. & Derek Watt on the Steelers going against their older brother, J. J., on the Texans for the first time ever. In the first quarter, the Steelers took an early 3–0 lead after Chris Boswell kicked a 33-yard field goal. However, the Texans took the lead later on in the quarter when DeShaun Watson found Randall Cobb on a 28-yard TD pass for a 7–3 lead. In the second quarter, the Texans made it 14–3 when David Johnson ran for a 2-yard TD. The Steelers fired back to take the lead with Ben Roethlisberger finding Eric Ebron a 10-yard TD pass, followed up by Roethlisberger finding JuJu Smith-Schuster on a 26-yard TD pass for a 17–14 lead. The Texans then scored on a Watson pass to Will Fuller to take back the lead at 21–17 before half. Chris Boswell scored the only points of the third quarter, kicking a field goal to bring the Steelers within one point with a score of 21–20. In the fourth quarter, James Conner ran for a touchdown and Smith-Schuster then caught a two-point conversion pass from Roethlisberger to put the Steelers ahead with what would be the final score of 28–21.

With the win, the Steelers go into their bye week 3–0. It would be the team's first 3–0 start since 2010. For the 60th consecutive game, the Steelers recorded at least one sack on defense, reaching the second longest streak in NFL history. The game also snapped a streak of 25 games with at least one turnover committed by the Steelers. In addition, the Steelers scored 28 points for the first time since December 23, 2018. With his 221st game played for the Steelers, Roethlisberger set a new franchise record. With the Ravens' loss to the Chiefs on Monday Night Football, the Steelers took the lead in the AFC North.

With the win, the Steelers beat the Texans for the third straight time.

==== Week 5: vs. Philadelphia Eagles ====
Week Five: Philadelphia Eagles at Pittsburgh Steelers – Game summary

Quarter	1	2	3	4	Total
Eagles	7	7	8	7	**29**
**Steelers**	7	10	14	7	**38**

at Heinz Field, Pittsburgh, Pennsylvania

- Date: October 11
- Game time: 1:00 pm. EDT
- Game weather: Cloudy, 70 °F (21 °C)
- Game attendance: 4,708
- Referee: Ronald Torbert
- TV announcers (Fox): Kenny Albert, Jonathan Vilma and Shannon Spake
- Recap, Game Book

Game information

**First quarter**

- PIT – Chase Claypool 2-yard run, (Chris Boswell kick) 1:04. Steelers 7–0. **Drive: 14 plays, 62 yards, 7:07.**
- PHI – Miles Sanders 74-yard run (Jake Elliott kick), 0:07. Tied 7–7. **Drive: 3 plays, 75 yards, 0:57.**

**Second quarter**

- PIT – Chase Claypool 32-yard pass from Ben Roethlisberger (Chris Boswell kick), 11:49. Steelers 14–7. **Drive: 7 plays, 75 yards, 3:18.**
- PHI – Miles Sanders 1-yard run (Jake Elliott kick), 6:17. Tied 14–14. **Drive: 10 plays, 76 yards, 5:32.**
- PIT – Chris Boswell 41-yard field goal, 1:57. Steelers 17–14. **Drive: 8 plays, 52 yards, 4:20.**

**Third quarter**

- PIT – Chase Claypool 5-yard pass from Ben Roethlisberger (Chris Boswell kick), 13:01. Steelers 24–14. **Drive: 6 plays, 75 yards, 1:59.**
- PIT – James Conner 1-yard run (Chris Boswell kick), 10:32. Steelers 31–14. **Drive: 4 plays, 23 yards, 2:12.**
- PHI – Greg Ward 8-yard pass from Carson Wentz (Carson Wentz–John Hightower pass), 5:58. Steelers 31–22. **Drive: 7 plays, 75 yards, 4:34**

**Fourth quarter**

- PHI – Travis Fulgham 4-yard pass from Carson Wentz (Jake Elliott kick), 11:27. Steelers 31–29. **Drive: 10 plays, 80 yards, 5:27.**
- PIT – Chase Claypool 35-yard pass from Ben Roethlisberger (Chris Boswell kick), 2:59. Steelers 38–29. **Drive: 4 plays, 53 yards, 0:19.**

**Top passers**

- PHI – Carson Wentz – 20/35, 258 yards, 2 TD, 2 INT
- PIT – Ben Roethlisberger – 27/34, 239 yards, 3 TD

**Top rushers**

- PHI – Miles Sanders – 11 rushes, 80 yards, 2 TD
- PIT – Ray-Ray McCloud – 2 rushes, 63 yards

**Top receivers**

- PHI – Travis Fulgham – 10 receptions, 152 yards, TD
- PIT – Chase Claypool – 7 receptions, 110 yards, 3 TD

After coming off their bye week, the Steelers stayed home for a game against the Eagles in the Battle of Pennsylvania. The Steelers were led by rookie Chase Claypool's 4 touchdowns. In the first quarter, the Steelers scored first when Chase Claypool ran for a 2-yard TD for a 7–0 lead. The Eagles tied it up when Miles Sanders ran for a 74-yard TD to make it 7–7. In the second quarter, the Steelers retook the lead when Ben Roethlisberger found Claypool on a 32-yard TD pass to make it 14–7. The Eagles tied the game back up when Sanders ran for a 1-yard TD for a 14–14 game. The Steelers then retook the lead before halftime when Chris Boswell kicked a 41-yard field goal to make it 17–14. The Steelers made it 24–14 and then 31–14 when Roethlisberger and Claypool hooked up again on a 5-yard touchdown pass, followed by James Conner's 1-yard TD run. The Eagles then drew closer after Carson Wentz found Greg Ward on an 8-yard TD pass (with a successful 2-point conversion) to make it 31–22. Then, they came closer in the fourth when Wentz found Travis Fulgham on a 4-yard TD pass to make it 31–29. Roethlisberger and Claypool closed out the scoring of the game when they hooked up for a 35-yard TD pass to make the final score 38–29.

With the win, the Steelers started their season 4–0 for the first time since 1979.

==== Week 6: vs. Cleveland Browns ====
Week Six: Cleveland Browns at Pittsburgh Steelers – Game summary

Quarter	1	2	3	4	Total
Browns	0	7	0	0	**7**
**Steelers**	10	14	7	7	**38**

at Heinz Field, Pittsburgh, Pennsylvania

- Date: October 18
- Game time: 1:00 pm. EDT
- Game weather: Mostly sunny, 61 °F (16 °C)
- Game attendance: 5,260
- Referee: John Hussey
- TV announcers (CBS): Jim Nantz, Tony Romo, Tracy Wolfson and Gene Steratore
- Recap, Game Book

Game information

**First quarter**

- PIT – Chris Boswell 35-yard field goal, 10:35. Steelers 3–0. **Drive: 11 plays, 58 yards, 4:25.**
- PIT – Minkah Fitzpatrick 33-yard interception return (Chris Boswell kick), 8:58. Steelers 10–0.

**Second quarter**

- PIT – James Conner 3-yard run (Chris Boswell kick), 10:28. Steelers 17–0. **Drive: 7 plays, 88 yards, 3:37.**
- PIT – James Washington 28-yard pass from Ben Roethlisberger (Chris Boswell kick), 5:43. Steelers 24–0. **Drive: 4 plays, 50 yards, 1:58.**
- CLE – Rashard Higgins 13-yard pass from Baker Mayfield, 1:01. Steelers 24–7. **Drive: 9 plays, 75 yards, 4:42.**

**Third quarter**

- PIT – Chase Claypool 3-yard run (Chris Boswell kick), 0:52. Steelers 31–7. **Drive: 8 plays, 28 yards, 5:03.**

**Fourth quarter**

- PIT – Benny Snell 1-yard run (Chris Boswell kick), 8:08. Steelers 38–7. **Drive: 9 plays, 55 yards, 5:35.**

**Top passers**

- CLE – Baker Mayfield – 10/18, 119 yards, TD, 2 INT
- PIT – Ben Roethlisberger – 14/22, 162 yards, TD

**Top rushers**

- CLE – Kareem Hunt – 13 rushes, 40 yards
- PIT – James Conner – 20 rushes, 101 yards, TD

**Top receivers**

- CLE – Austin Hooper – 5 receptions, 52 yards
- PIT – Chase Claypool – 4 receptions, 74 yards

After another tough victory, the Steelers stayed home for their first game against the Browns. The Steelers jumped out to a 24–0 lead before the Browns got on the board via Baker Mayfield's 13-yard TD pass to Rashard Higgins just before halftime. From the third quarter onwards, the Steelers scored the remaining 14 points to make the final score 38–7.

With the win, the Steelers improved to 5–0 for the first time since 1978. The Steelers extended their home winning streak over the Browns to 17 games, dating back to 2004.

==== Week 7: at Tennessee Titans ====
Week Seven: Pittsburgh Steelers at Tennessee Titans – Game summary

Quarter	1	2	3	4	Total
**Steelers**	7	17	3	0	**27**
Titans	0	7	10	7	**24**

at Nissan Stadium, Nashville, Tennessee

- Date: October 25
- Game time: 1:00 pm. EDT/12:00 p.m. CDT
- Game weather: Cloudy, 55 °F (13 °C)
- Game attendance: 10,355
- Referee: Shawn Hochuli
- TV announcers (CBS): Ian Eagle, Charles Davis and Evan Washburn
- Recap, Game Book

Game information

**First quarter**

- PIT – Diontae Johnson 11-yard pass from Ben Roethlisberger (Chris Boswell kick), 5:42. Steelers 7–0. **Drive: 16 plays, 75 yards, 9:18.**

**Second quarter**

- PIT – Benny Snell 1-yard run (Chris Boswell kick), 5:26. Steelers 14–0. **Drive: 13 plays, 61 yards, 7:05.**
- TEN – Corey Davis 4-yard pass from Ryan Tannehill (Stephen Gostkowski kick), 2:50. Steelers 14–7. **Drive: 12 plays, 75 yards, 6:50.**
- PIT – Chris Boswell 38-yard field goal, 2:50. Steelers 17–7. **Drive: 7 plays, 55 yards, 2:36.**
- PIT – Diontae Johnson 9-yard pass from Ben Roethlisberger (Chris Boswell kick), 0:52. Steelers 24–7. **Drive: 3 plays, 17 yards, 0:43.**

**Third quarter**

- PIT – Chris Boswell 30-yard field goal, 10:26. Steelers 27–7. **Drive: 7 plays, 54 yards, 2:53.**
- TEN – A. J. Brown 73-yard pass from Ryan Tannehill (Stephen Gostkowski kick), 9:36. Steelers 27–14. **Drive: 2 plays, 75 yards, 0:50.**
- TEN – Stephen Gostkowski 51-yard field goal, 2:55. Steelers 27–17. **Drive: 4 plays, -3 yards, 0:49.**

**Fourth quarter**

- TEN – Derrick Henry 1-yard run (Stephen Gostkowski kick), 10:13. Steelers 27–24. **Drive: 12 plays, 70 yards, 5:25.**

**Top passers**

- PIT – Ben Roethlisberger – 32/49, 268 yards, 2 TD, 3 INT
- TEN – Ryan Tannehill – 18/30, 220 yards, 2 TD

**Top rushers**

- PIT – James Conner – 20 rushes, 82 yards
- TEN – Derrick Henry – 20 rushes, 75 yards, TD

**Top receivers**

- PIT – JuJu Smith-Schuster – 9 receptions, 85 yards
- TEN – A. J. Brown – 6 receptions, 153 yards, TD

After going 4–0 in their 4-game home stand, the Steelers then traveled for the first of a 3-game road trip against the Titans. They scored first in the first quarter when Ben Roethlisberger found Diontae Johnson on an 11-yard TD to make it 7–0. They made it 14–0 in the second quarter when Benny Snell ran for a 1-yard TD. The Titans then got on the board when Corey Davis caught a 4-yard TD pass from Ryan Tannehill to make it 14–7. The Steelers closed out the half with 10 straight points: Chris Boswell kicked a 38-yard field goal to make it 17–7 and then Johnson and Roethlisberger connected again on a 9-yard TD pass to make it 24–7. In the third quarter, the Steelers scored again to move up by 20 with Boswell's 30-yard field goal to make it 27–7. It would be all Titans the rest of the game. Tannehill found A.J. Brown on a 73-yard TD pass to make it 27–14. Stephen Gostkowski closed out the third quarter when he kicked a 51-yard field goal to make it 27–17. Derrick Henry then ran for a 1-yard TD in the fourth to make the score 27–24. Getting the ball back with seconds left, Gostkowski missed the game-tying field goal, sealing yet another win for the Steelers.

With the win, the Steelers improved to 6–0 for the second time in their franchise history; their first such start since 1978. They stand as the AFC's only undefeated team. With the Seahawks' loss to the Cardinals on Sunday Night Football, the Steelers stand as the NFL's only undefeated team through 7 weeks.

In the game, the Steelers scored an opening drive touchdown for the first time since Week 15 of the 2018 season.

This game was originally supposed to be played during Week 4, but was postponed due to the positive cases of COVID-19 within the Titans' organization.

This win marked the third straight time the Steelers have beaten the Titans.

==== Week 8: at Baltimore Ravens ====
Week Eight: Pittsburgh Steelers at Baltimore Ravens – Game summary

Quarter	1	2	3	4	Total
**Steelers**	7	0	14	7	**28**
Ravens	7	10	0	7	**24**

at M&T Bank Stadium, Baltimore, Maryland

- Date: November 1
- Game time: 1:00 pm. EST
- Game weather: Cloudy, 52 °F (11 °C)
- Game attendance: 4,345
- Referee: Brad Allen
- TV announcers (CBS): Jim Nantz, Tony Romo, Tracy Wolfson and Gene Steratore
- Recap, Game Book

Game information

**First quarter**

- PIT – Robert Spillane 33-yard interception return (Chris Boswell kick), 14:06. Steelers 7–0.
- BAL – Miles Boykin 6-yard pass from Lamar Jackson (Justin Tucker kick), 8:44. Tied 7–7. **Drive: 9 plays, 75 yards, 5:22.**

**Second quarter**

- BAL – Gus Edwards 1-yard run (Justin Tucker kick), 13:21. Ravens 14–7. **Drive: 2 plays, 21 yards, 0:43.**
- BAL – Justin Tucker 51-yard field goal, 0:00. Ravens 17–7. **Drive: 15 plays, 59 yards, 3:44.**

**Third quarter**

- PIT – Eric Ebron 18-yard pass from Ben Roethlisberger (Chris Boswell kick), 13:21. Ravens 17–14. **Drive: 2 plays, 21 yards, 0:43.**
- PIT – James Conner 1-yard run (Chris Boswell kick), 5:38. Steelers 21–17. **Drive: 10 plays, 77 yards, 6:10.**

**Fourth quarter**

- BAL – Marquise Brown 3-yard pass from Lamar Jackson (Justin Tucker kick), 11:56. Ravens 24–21. **Drive: 8 plays, 53 yards, 3:58.**
- PIT – Chase Claypool 8-yard pass from Ben Roethlisberger (Chris Boswell kick), 7:29. Steelers 28–24. **Drive: 8 plays, 80 yards, 4:27.**

**Top passers**

- PIT – Ben Roethlisberger – 21/32, 182 yards, 2 TD
- BAL – Lamar Jackson – 13/28, 208 yards, 2 TD, 2 INT

**Top rushers**

- PIT – James Conner – 15 rushes, 47 yards, TD
- BAL – J. K. Dobbins – 15 rushes, 113 yards

**Top receivers**

- PIT – JuJu Smith-Schuster – 7 receptions, 67 yards
- BAL – Willie Snead IV – 5 receptions, 106 yards

After a tough road win, the Steelers then traveled again for their first game against the Ravens. The Steelers scored first in the first quarter when Robert Spillane returned an interception 33 yards for a touchdown to make it 7–0. The Ravens then scored 17 straight points to make it 17–7 in their favor at halftime, beginning when Lamar Jackson found Miles Boykin on a 6-yard pass to tie the game up, followed by Gus Edwards running for a 1-yard touchdown, and concluded by Justin Tucker's 51-yard field goal. In the third quarter, it was all Steelers, as they retook the lead when they made it 21–17 with Ben Roethlisberger's 18-yard touchdown pass to TE Eric Ebron followed up by James Conner's 1-yard touchdown run. In the fourth quarter, the Ravens would retake the lead when Jackson found Marquise Brown on a 3-yard touchdown to make it 24–21. Roethlisberger got the Steelers the lead back when he connected with Chase Claypool on an 8-yard touchdown pass, making the score 28–24. After stopping the Steelers and forcing them to punt with under one minute left, the Ravens were able to drive down the field. Jackson attempted a pass to the end zone on the final play to win the game, but it fell incomplete, sealing yet another win for the Steelers.

With the win, the Steelers improved to 7–0, their second 7–0 start in franchise history and first such start since 1978. They also defeated the Ravens for the first time since Week 9 of the 2018 season, defeating Lamar Jackson as a starter for the first time.

By shutting out Baltimore in the third quarter, the Steelers stopped an NFL-record 26 consecutive quarters of scoring by the Ravens. The game marked the first time in his career that Lamar Jackson lost a game after leading at halftime, and also marked the most giveaways by Jackson in a game with four.

==== Week 9: at Dallas Cowboys ====
Week Nine: Pittsburgh Steelers at Dallas Cowboys – Game summary

Quarter	1	2	3	4	Total
**Steelers**	0	9	0	15	**24**
Cowboys	3	10	6	0	**19**

at AT&T Stadium, Arlington, Texas

- Date: November 8
- Game time: 4:25 pm. EST/3:25 pm. CST
- Game weather: Cloudy, 70 °F (21 °C) (retractable roof open)
- Game attendance: 31,700
- Referee: Tony Corrente
- TV announcers (CBS): Jim Nantz, Tony Romo, Tracy Wolfson and Gene Steratore
- Recap, Game Book

Game information

**First quarter**

- DAL – Greg Zuerlein 38-yard field goal, 3:55. Cowboys 3–0. **Drive: 12 plays, 65 yards, 6:47.**

**Second quarter**

- DAL – CeeDee Lamb 20-yard pass from Garrett Gilbert (Greg Zuerlein kick), 7:45. Cowboys 10–0. **Drive: 8 plays, 65 yards, 3:41.**
- DAL – Greg Zuerlein 44-yard field goal, 3:46. Cowboys 13–0. **Drive: 4 plays, 5 yards, 2:15.**
- PIT – James Washington 17-yard pass from Ben Roethlisberger (Chris Boswell PAT failed), 1:10. Cowboys 13–6. **Drive: 9 plays, 75 yards, 2:36.**
- PIT – Chris Boswell 59-yard field goal, 0:00. Cowboys 13–9. **Drive: 4 plays, −2 yards, 0:52.**

**Third quarter**

- DAL – Greg Zuerlein 45-yard field goal, 10:17. Cowboys 16–9. **Drive: 11 plays, 50 yards, 4:43.**
- DAL – Greg Zuerlein 39-yard field goal, 2:13. Cowboys 19–9. **Drive: 12 plays, 53 yards, 6:26.**

**Fourth Quarter**

- PIT – JuJu Smith-Schuster 31-yard pass from Ben Roethlisberger (Chris Boswell PAT blocked), 14:51. Cowboys 19–15. **Drive: 6 plays, 75 yards, 2:22.**
- PIT – Chris Boswell 43-yard field goal, 7:11. Cowboys 19–18. **Drive: 11 plays, 75 yards, 4:34.**
- PIT – Eric Ebron 8-yard pass from Ben Roethlisberger (pass failed), 2:14. Steelers 24–19. **Drive: 6 plays, 79 yards, 1:57.**

**Top passers**

- PIT – Ben Roethlisberger – 29/42, 306 yards, 3 TD
- DAL – Garrett Gilbert – 21/38, 243 yards, TD, INT

**Top rushers**

- PIT – James Conner – 9 rushes, 22 yards
- DAL – Tony Pollard – 9 rushes, 57 yards

**Top receivers**

- PIT – JuJu Smith-Schuster – 6 receptions, 93 yards, TD
- DAL – CeeDee Lamb – 4 receptions, 71 yards, TD

After another close win, the Steelers traveled again to Arlington, Texas to take on the Cowboys. From the first into the second quarter, the Cowboys jumped to a 13–0 lead before the Steelers managed to score twice within the final two minutes of the half to make it a 13–9 game at halftime. In the third quarter, the Cowboys moved up by 10 with Greg Zuerlein's 45 and 39-yard field goals, making it 19–9. However, in the fourth quarter, it was all Steelers, who managed to come back with three straight scores: a Ben Roethlisberger to JuJu Smith-Schuster 31-yard TD pass (with a failed PAT); a Chris Boswell 43-yard field goal; and then finally a Roethlisberger to Eric Ebron 8-yard TD pass (with a failed 2-point conversion) to take a 24–19 lead. After forcing a turnover on downs, the Cowboys got the ball back to drive into Steelers territory with under a minute left in the game. However, Garrett Gilbert's pass fell incomplete in the end zone, sealing yet another Steelers win.

With the win, the Steelers improved to 8–0, the team's first 8–0 start in franchise history. The 8-game winning streak is the Steelers' longest regular season win streak since Weeks 6–14 of the 2017 season.

==== Week 10: vs. Cincinnati Bengals ====
Week Ten: Cincinnati Bengals at Pittsburgh Steelers – Game summary

Quarter	1	2	3	4	Total
Bengals	0	7	0	3	**10**
**Steelers**	12	10	7	7	**36**

at Heinz Field, Pittsburgh, Pennsylvania

- Date: November 15
- Game time: 4:25 pm. EST
- Game weather: Cloudy, 52 °F (11 °C)
- Game attendance: 5,909
- Referee: Adrian Hill
- TV announcers (Fox): Kenny Albert, Jonathan Vilma and Shannon Spake
- Recap, Game Book

Game information

**First quarter**

- PIT – Chris Boswell 41-yard field goal, 11:23. Steelers 3–0. **Drive: 4 plays, 9 yards, 2:01.**
- PIT – Chris Boswell 30-yard field goal, 4:50. Steelers 6–0. **Drive: 6 plays, 34 yards, 2:25**
- PIT – Diontae Johnson 12-yard pass from Ben Roethlisberger (pass failed), 1:51. Steelers 12–0. **Drive: 3 plays, 74 yards, 1:01.**

**Second quarter**

- CIN – Tee Higgins 2-yard pass from Joe Burrow (Randy Bullock kick), 10:37. Steelers 12–7. **Drive: 8 plays, 90 yards, 3:21.**
- PIT – JuJu Smith-Schuster 8-yard pass from Ben Roethlisberger (Chris Boswell kick), 7:23. Steelers 19–7. **Drive: 7 plays, 78 yards, 3:14.**
- PIT – Chris Boswell 45-yard field goal, 1:48. Steelers 22–7. **Drive: 8 plays, 57 yards, 2:20.**

**Third quarter**

- PIT – Chase Claypool 11-yard pass from Ben Roethlisberger (Chris Boswell kick), 4:22. Steelers 29–7. **Drive: 5 plays, 15 yards, 4:12.**

**Fourth quarter**

- PIT – Chase Claypool 5-yard pass from Ben Roethlisberger (Chris Boswell kick), 10:31. Steelers 36–7. **Drive: 5 plays, 15 yards, 2:41.**
- CIN – Randy Bullock 37-yard field goal, 5:05. Steelers 36–10. **Drive: 10 plays, 56 yards, 5:26.**

**Top passers**

- CIN – Joe Burrow – 21/40, 213 yards, TD
- PIT – Ben Roethlisberger – 27/46, 333 yards, 4 TD

**Top rushers**

- CIN – Samaje Perine – 7 rushes, 48 yards
- PIT – James Conner – 13 rushes, 36 yards

**Top receivers**

- CIN – Tee Higgins – 7 receptions, 115 yards, TD
- PIT – Diontae Johnson – 6 receptions, 116 yards, TD

After another tough road win, the Steelers headed home for Round 1 against the Bengals. In the first quarter, the Steelers jumped out to a 12–0 lead after 2 field goals from Chris Boswell, from 41 and 30 yards out, followed by Ben Roethlisberger connecting with Diontae Johnson on a 12-yard TD pass (with a failed 2-point conversion). The Bengals responded, coming within 5 when Joe Burrow found Tee Higgins on a 2-yard TD pass to make it 12–7. However, the Steelers would pull away by double digits before halftime when Roethlisberger found JuJu Smith-Schuster on an 8-yard TD pass to make it 19–7. Finally, Boswell kicked a 45-yard field goal to make it 22–7 at halftime. The Steelers scored the only points of the third quarter when Roethlisberger connected with Chase Claypool for an 11-yard TD pass to make it 29–7. In the fourth quarter, Roethlisberger and Claypool connected again for a 5-yard TD pass, putting the team up 36–7. The Bengals wrapped up the scoring of the game with Randy Bullock's 37-yard field goal to make the final score 36–10.

With the win, the Steelers improved to 9–0 for the first time in their history. The team also won their 11th straight game over the Bengals and won 9 games in a row for the first time since 2004.

==== Week 11: at Jacksonville Jaguars ====
Week Eleven: Pittsburgh Steelers at Jacksonville Jaguars – Game summary

Quarter	1	2	3	4	Total
**Steelers**	0	17	0	10	**27**
Jaguars	3	0	0	0	**3**

at TIAA Bank Field, Jacksonville, Florida

- Date: November 22
- Game time: 1:00 pm. EST
- Game weather: Cloudy, 72 °F (22 °C)
- Game attendance: 17,244
- Referee: Scott Novak
- TV announcers (CBS): Ian Eagle, Charles Davis and Evan Washburn
- Recap, Game Book

Game information

**First quarter**

- JAX – Chase McLaughlin 41-yard field goal, 10:57. Jaguars 3–0. **Drive: 9 plays, 52 yards, 4:03.**

**Second quarter**

- PIT – Chris Boswell 44-yard field goal, 10:45. Tied 3–3. **Drive: 9 plays, 50 yards, 4:15.**
- PIT – Chase Claypool 31-yard pass from Ben Roethlisberger (Chris Boswell kick), 7:00. Steelers 10–3. **Drive: 6 plays, 71 yards, 2:49.**
- PIT – Benny Snell 1-yard run (Chris Boswell kick), 0:44. Steelers 17–3. **Drive: 7 plays, 61 yards, 2:13.**

**Third quarter**

- No scoring plays.

**Fourth quarter**

- PIT – Chris Boswell 47-yard field goal, 10:21. Steelers 20–3. **Drive: 9 plays, 45 yards, 3:50.**
- PIT – Eric Ebron 20-yard pass from Ben Roethlisberger (Chris Boswell kick), 6:40. Steelers 27–3. **Drive: 4 plays, 50 yards, 1:52.**

**Top passers**

- PIT – Ben Roethlisberger – 32/46, 267 yards, 2 TD, INT
- JAX – Jake Luton – 16/37, 151 yards, 4 INT

**Top rushers**

- PIT – James Conner – 13 rushes, 89 yards
- JAX – James Robinson – 17 rushes, 73 yards

**Top receivers**

- PIT – Diontae Johnson – 12 receptions, 111 yards
- JAX – D. J. Chark – 4 receptions, 41 yards

After a huge win at home, the Steelers traveled south to take on the Jaguars. In the first quarter, the Jags would score a 41-yard field goal kicked by Chris McLaughlin to take a 3–0 lead for the quarter's only score. However, the Steelers would score all of the game's remaining points and win 27–3 for their biggest road victory of the season.

With the win, the Steelers improved to 10–0 for the first time ever in franchise history, and became the 18th team in NFL history to open 10–0 in the Super Bowl era. The Steelers also won 10 straight games for the first time since 2004.

==== Week 12: vs. Baltimore Ravens ====
Week Twelve: Baltimore Ravens at Pittsburgh Steelers – Game summary

Quarter	1	2	3	4	Total
Ravens	7	0	0	7	**14**
**Steelers**	6	6	0	7	**19**

at Heinz Field, Pittsburgh, Pennsylvania

- Date: December 2
- Game time: 3:40 pm. EST
- Game weather: Sunny, 37 °F (3 °C)
- Game attendance: 500 ( Friends and family of players )
- Referee: Ronald Torbert
- TV announcers (NBC): Mike Tirico, Cris Collinsworth, Michele Tafoya and Terry McAulay
- Recap, Game Book

Game information

**First quarter**

- PIT – Joe Haden 14-yard interception return (kick failed), 6:57. Steelers 6–0.
- BAL – Gus Edwards 1-yard run (Justin Tucker kick), 5:17. Ravens 7–6. **Drive: 4 plays, 16 yards, 2:24.**

**Second quarter**

- PIT – Chris Boswell 25-yard field goal, 11:50. Steelers 9–7 . **Drive: 12 plays, 73 yards, 5:17.**
- PIT – Chris Boswell 27-yard field goal, 4:27. Steelers 12–7 . **Drive: 13 plays, 65 yards, 5:14.**

**Third quarter**

- No scoring plays.

**Fourth quarter**

- PIT – JuJu Smith-Schuster 1-yard pass from Ben Roethlisberger (Chris Boswell kick), 13:20. Steelers 19–7. **Drive: 12 plays, 61 yards, 4:52.**
- BAL – Marquise Brown 70-yard pass from Trace McSorley (Justin Tucker kick), 2:58. Steelers 19–14. **Drive: 2 plays, 84 yards, 0:32.**

**Top passers**

- BAL – Trace McSorley – 2/6, 77 yards, TD
- PIT – Ben Roethlisberger – 36/51, 266 yards, TD, INT

**Top rushers**

- BAL – Robert Griffin III – 7 rushes, 68 yards
- PIT – Benny Snell – 16 rushes, 60 yards

**Top receivers**

- BAL – Marquise Brown – 4 receptions, 85 yards, TD
- PIT – Eric Ebron – 7 receptions, 54 yards

After a road win, the Steelers returned home for their second game against the Ravens. In the first quarter, the Steelers made it 6-0 when Joe Haden returned an interception 14 yards for a touchdown (with a failed PAT). The Ravens took the lead later on with Gus Edwards's 1-yard touchdown run to make it 7–6. In the second quarter, the Steelers took the lead with Chris Boswell field goals from 25 and 27 yards out to make it 12–7. After a scoreless third quarter, the Steelers increased their lead in the fourth quarter when Ben Roethlisberger found JuJu Smith-Schuster on a 1-yard touchdown pass, making it 19–7. Later on in the quarter, the Ravens would wrap the scoring of the game up when third-string QB Trace McSorley found Marquise Brown on a 70-yard touchdown pass to make the final score 19–14.

With the win, the Steelers improved to 11–0 for the first time ever. The team swept the Ravens for the first time since 2017 and for the first time in the Lamar Jackson era. They also won 11 in a row for the first time since 2004.

==== Week 13: vs. Washington Football Team ====
Week Thirteen: Washington Football Team at Pittsburgh Steelers – Game summary

Quarter	1	2	3	4	Total
**Washington**	0	3	7	13	**23**
Steelers	0	14	0	3	**17**

at Heinz Field, Pittsburgh, Pennsylvania

- Date: December 7
- Game time: 5:00 pm. EST
- Game weather: Cloudy, 34 °F (1 °C)
- Game attendance: 500 (Family Members and Friends)
- Referee: John Hussey
- TV announcers (Fox): Kevin Burkhardt, Daryl Johnston and Pam Oliver
- Recap, Game Book

Game information

**First quarter**

- No scoring plays.

**Second quarter**

- PIT – Diontae Johnson 3-yard pass from Ben Roethlisberger (Matthew Wright kick), 10:33. Steelers 7–0. **Drive: 14 plays, 72 yards, 6:16.**
- PIT – James Washington 50-yard pass from Ben Roethlisberger (Matthew Wright kick), 3:54. Steelers 14–0. **Drive: 1 play, 50 yards, 0:09.**
- WAS – Dustin Hopkins 49-yard field goal, 0:01. Steelers 14–3. **Drive: 6 plays, 28 yards, 0:49.**

**Third quarter**

- WAS – Peyton Barber 1-yard run (Dustin Hopkins kick), 8:16. Steelers 14–10. **Drive: 14 plays, 82 yards, 4:23.**

**Fourth quarter**

- PIT – Matthew Wright 37-yard field goal, 14:57. Steelers 17–10. **Drive: 11 plays, 63 yards, 4:23.**
- WAS – Logan Thomas 15-yard pass from Alex Smith (Dustin Hopkins kick), 9:09. Tied 17–17. **Drive: 8 plays, 53 yards, 3:14.**
- WAS – Dustin Hopkins 45-yard field goal, 2:07. Washington 20–17. **Drive: 9 plays, 45 yards, 2:49.**
- WAS – Dustin Hopkins 45-yard field goal, 0:17. Washington 23–17. **Drive: 4 plays, -2 yards, 1:42.**

**Top passers**

- WAS – Alex Smith – 31/46, 296 yards, TD
- PIT – Ben Roethlisberger – 33/53, 305 yards, 2 TD, INT

**Top rushers**

- WAS – Peyton Barber – 14 rushes, 23 yards, TD
- PIT – Anthony McFarland – 4 rushes, 15 yards

**Top receivers**

- WAS – Logan Thomas – 9 receptions, 98 yards, TD
- PIT – James Washington – 2 receptions, 80 yards, TD

After a tough home win, the Steelers stayed home for a game against the Washington Football Team. After a scoreless first quarter, the Steelers jumped out to a 14–0 lead. Dustin Hopkins kicked a 49-yard field goal, making it 14–3 at halftime. Then in the third quarter, Peyton Barber ran for a 1-yard touchdown, making it 14–10. In the fourth quarter, the Steelers moved up by a touchdown after Matthew Wright kicked a 37-yard field goal, making it 17–10. However, Washington came back with 3 straight scores to win it 23–17, upsetting the Steelers.

With their 11-game winning streak snapped, the Steelers fell to 11–1. They also lost at home on Monday for the first time since 1991, which was also the last year that the Steelers lost to the Washington Football Team (then the Washington Redskins), who went on to win Super Bowl XXVI. With the New York Jets standing at 0–12, the Steelers' loss also ended the possibility of the 2020 season becoming the first to feature both an undefeated and winless team in one season.

With Robert Spillane's sack of Alex Smith in the first quarter, the Steelers tied the Tampa Bay Buccaneers' league record set in 2003 for the longest streak of games with at least one team sack, at 69 games.

==== Week 14: at Buffalo Bills ====
Week Fourteen: Pittsburgh Steelers at Buffalo Bills – Game summary

Quarter	1	2	3	4	Total
Steelers	0	7	0	8	**15**
**Bills**	0	9	14	3	**26**

at Bills Stadium, Orchard Park, New York

- Date: December 13
- Game time: 8:20 pm. EST
- Game weather: Cloudy with snow flurries, 35 °F (2 °C)
- Game attendance: 0
- Referee: Shawn Smith
- TV announcers (NBC): Mike Tirico, Cris Collinsworth, Kathryn Tappen, and Terry McAulay
- Recap, Game Book

Game information

**First quarter**

- No scoring drives

**Second quarter**

- PIT – James Washington 19-yard pass from Ben Roethlisberger (Chris Boswell kick), 8:21. Steelers 7–0. **Drive: 3 plays, 30 yards, 1:15.**
- BUF – Tyler Bass 34-yard field goal, 1:42. Steelers 7–3. **Drive: 9 plays, 58 yards, 3:14.**
- BUF – Taron Johnson 51-yard interception return (kick failed), 0:52. Bills 9–7. **Drive: 9 plays, 50 yards, 4:15.**

**Third quarter**

- BUF – Stefon Diggs 19-yard pass from Josh Allen (Tyler Bass kick), 10:23. Bills 16–7. **Drive: 8 plays, 68 yards, 4:37.**
- BUF – Gabe Davis 13-yard pass from Josh Allen (Tyler Bass kick), 7:02. Bills 23–7. **Drive: 4 plays, 57 yards, 2:05.**

**Fourth Quarter**

- PIT – JuJu Smith-Schuster 3-yard pass from Ben Roethlisberger (Ben Roethlisberger–Eric Ebron pass), 12:18. Bills 23–15. **Drive: 10 plays, 81 yards, 4:38.**
- BUF – Tyler Bass 23-yard field goal, 8:07. Bills 26–15. **Drive: 11 plays, 61 yards, 4:11.**

**Top passers**

- PIT – Ben Roethlisberger – 21/37, 187 yards, 2 TD, 2 INT
- BUF – Josh Allen – 24/43, 238 yards, 2 TD, INT

**Top rushers**

- PIT – James Conner – 10 rushes, 18 yards
- BUF – Zack Moss – 13 rushes, 43 yards

**Top receivers**

- PIT – JuJu Smith-Schuster – 6 receptions, 55 yards, TD
- BUF – Stefon Diggs – 10 receptions, 130 yards, TD

The game was a defensive struggle for most of the first half. Both teams combined for eight three-and-outs for the first twenty minutes of the game before a Dawson Knox fumble gave Pittsburgh the ball inside Buffalo territory, enabling Roethlisberger to find James Washington in the endzone. After an exchange of punts, Buffalo responded with their first red zone drive of the night producing a Tyler Bass 34-yard field goal, and a Taron Johnson 51-yard pick six shortly after Pittsburgh got the ball back, for a halftime score of 9–7 in favor of the hosts. Both teams improved offensively in the second half as the snow let up, but a fourth-quarter interception by the Buffalo defense was enough to seal a 26–15 Steelers loss, only their second of the season and their first loss by more than one score with Roethlisberger under center since Week 1 of 2019. This was their first loss at Buffalo since 1999.

With the loss, the Steelers fell to 11–2 and fell from first to second place in the overall AFC standings, even with their best win–loss record through thirteen games since 2017.

With Tyson Alualu's sack of Josh Allen in the second quarter, the Steelers passed the Tampa Bay Buccaneers for the league record for the longest streak of games with at least one team sack.

==== Week 15: at Cincinnati Bengals ====
Week Fifteen: Pittsburgh Steelers at Cincinnati Bengals – Game summary

Quarter	1	2	3	4	Total
Steelers	0	0	10	7	**17**
**Bengals**	3	14	0	10	**27**

at Paul Brown Stadium, Cincinnati, Ohio

- Date: December 21
- Game time: 8:15 pm. EST
- Game weather: Cloudy, 43 °F (6 °C)
- Game attendance: 10,249
- Referee: John Hussey
- TV announcers (ESPN): Steve Levy, Brian Griese, Louis Riddick and John Parry
- Recap, Game Book

Game information

**First quarter**

- CIN – Austin Seibert 34-yard field goal, 5:12. Bengals 3–0. **Drive: 6 plays, 4 yards, 4:04.**

**Second quarter**

- CIN – Giovani Bernard 4-yard run (Austin Seibert kick), 12:05. Bengals 10–0. **Drive: 7 plays, 38 yards, 3:44.**
- CIN – Giovani Bernard 14-yard pass from Ryan Finley (Austin Seibert kick), 4:20. Bengals 17–0. **Drive: 3 plays, 26 yards, 1:32.**

**Third quarter**

- PIT – Diontae Johnson 23-yard pass from Ben Roethlisberger (Chris Boswell kick), 12:07. Bengals 17–7. **Drive: 4 plays, 67 yards, 1:27.**
- PIT – Chris Boswell 25-yard field goal, 5:27. Bengals 17–10. **Drive: 10 plays, 67 yards, 5:00.**

**Fourth quarter**

- CIN – Ryan Finley 23-yard run (Austin Seibert kick), 11:21. Bengals 24–10. **Drive: 9 plays, 80 yards, 5:54.**
- PIT – Benny Snell 1-yard run (Chris Boswell kick), 5:32. Bengals 24–17. **Drive: 12 plays, 75 yards, 5:49.**
- CIN – Austin Seibert 33-yard field goal, 0:12. Bengals 27–17. **Drive: 4 plays, 9 yards, 1:40.**

**Top passers**

- PIT – Ben Roethlisberger – 20/38, 170 yards, TD, INT
- CIN – Ryan Finley – 7/13, 89 yards, TD

**Top rushers**

- PIT – Benny Snell – 18 rushes, 84 yards, TD
- CIN – Giovani Bernard – 25 rushes, 83 yards, TD

**Top receivers**

- PIT – Diontae Johnson – 8 receptions, 59 yards, TD
- CIN – A. J. Green – 2 receptions, 40 yards

After another loss, the Steelers traveled to Cincinnati for Round 2 against the Bengals. The Bengals would jump out to a 17–0 halftime lead, with all of their points coming off turnovers, before the Steelers came within 7 after a touchdown pass from Ben Roethlisberger to Diontae Johnson from 23 yards out, followed by Chris Boswell kicking a 25-yard field goal, making it 17–10. The Bengals pulled away in the fourth quarter when Ryan Finley ran for a 23-yard touchdown, making it 24–10. Benny Snell ran for a 1-yard touchdown to make it 24–17, but Austin Seibert kicked a 33-yard field goal to make the final score 27–17 in favor of the Bengals.

With their third straight loss, the Steelers fell to 11–3, and their lead in the AFC North shrunk to one game ahead of the Browns. They also had their 11-game winning streak against the Bengals snapped, having lost to them for the first time since Week 8 of 2015, which was at home. The Steelers were defeated by the Bengals in Cincinnati for the first time since Week 2 of 2013.

==== Week 16: vs. Indianapolis Colts ====
Week Sixteen: Indianapolis Colts at Pittsburgh Steelers – Game summary

Quarter	1	2	3	4	Total
Colts	7	14	3	0	**24**
**Steelers**	0	7	7	14	**28**

at Heinz Field, Pittsburgh, Pennsylvania

- Date: December 27
- Game time: 1:00 pm. EST
- Game weather: Sunny, 37 °F (3 °C)
- Game attendance: 0
- Referee: Alex Kemp
- TV announcers (CBS): Jim Nantz, Tony Romo, Tracy Wolfson and Gene Steratore
- Recap, Game Book

Game information

**First quarter**

- IND – Jonathan Taylor 6-yard run (Rodrigo Blankenship kick), 9:48. Colts 7–0. **Drive: 9 plays, 70 yards, 4:45.**

**Second quarter**

- PIT – James Conner 1-yard run (Matthew Wright kick), 13:47. Tied 7–7. **Drive: 3 plays, 3 yards, 0:50.**
- IND – Jonathan Taylor 1-yard run (Rodrigo Blankenship kick), 6:35. Colts 14–7. **Drive: 12 plays, 85 yards, 7:12.**
- IND – Zach Pascal 42-yard pass from Philip Rivers, 4:02. Colts 21–7. **Drive: 2 plays, 43 yards, 0:48.**

**Third quarter**

- IND – Rodrigo Blankenship 28-yard field goal, 9:23. Colts 24–7. **Drive: 10 plays, 65 yards, 5:37.**
- PIT – Diontae Johnson 39-yard pass from Ben Roethlisberger (Matthew Wright kick), 3:16. Colts 24–14. **Drive: 1 play, 39 yards, 0:07.**

**Fourth quarter**

- PIT – Eric Ebron 5-yard pass from Ben Roethlisberger (Matthew Wright kick), 14:52. Colts 24–21. **Drive: 5 plays, 74 yards, 1:51.**
- PIT – JuJu Smith-Schuster 25-yard pass from Ben Roethlisberger (Matthew Wright kick), 7:38. Steelers 28–24. **Drive: 10 plays, 84 yards, 4:28.**

**Top passers**

- IND – Philip Rivers – 22/35, 270 yards, TD, INT
- PIT – Ben Roethlisberger – 34/49, 341 yards, 3 TD

**Top rushers**

- IND – Jonathan Taylor – 18 rushes, 74 yards, 2 TD
- PIT – James Conner – 5 rushes, 20 yards, TD

**Top receivers**

- IND – Zach Pascal – 3 receptions, 64 yards, TD
- PIT – JuJu Smith-Schuster – 9 receptions, 96 yards, TD

After another tough loss, the Steelers went back home to take on the Colts in their final home game of the season. The Colts scored the only points of the first quarter when Jonathan Taylor ran for a 6-yard TD to make it 7–0. The Steelers would tie it up in the second quarter when James Conner ran for a 1-yard TD. The Colts would go up 21–7 at halftime after Taylor ran for another TD, followed up by Philip Rivers finding Zach Pascal on a 42-yard pass. In the third quarter, the Colts moved up by 17 after Rodrigo Blankenship kicked a 28-yard field goal for a 24–7 lead. Starting in the third quarter and info the fourth, the Steelers went on a 21–0 run, with Ben Roethlisberger finding 3 different receivers for TD passes: a 39-yard pass to Diontae Johnson late in the third; a 5-yard pass to Eric Ebron in the fourth; and then finally a 25-yard pass to JuJu Smith-Schuster to take a 28–24 lead. Getting the ball back with a little over two minutes in the game, the Colts were able to drive into Steelers' territory after a pass interference penalty on the defense. However, the Colts would eventually wind up with a turnover on downs, giving the ball and the game to the Steelers, snapping the team's losing streak.

With their 3-game losing streak snapped, the Steelers improved to 12–3 and won the AFC North division title.

The Steelers defeated the Colts for the 7th consecutive time and improved to 25–6 all-time against the Colts, with a 16–2 record in Pittsburgh (both including playoffs). The win ensured the team of entering the playoffs as the #3 seed.

This would be the Steelers last division title until 2025.

==== Week 17: at Cleveland Browns ====
Week Seventeen: Pittsburgh Steelers at Cleveland Browns – Game summary

Quarter	1	2	3	4	Total
Steelers	0	6	3	13	**22**
**Browns**	7	3	7	7	**24**

at FirstEnergy Stadium, Cleveland, Ohio

- Date: January 3, 2021
- Game time: 1:00 pm. EST
- Game weather: Cloudy, 38 °F (3 °C)
- Game attendance: 11,989
- Referee: Jerome Boger
- TV announcers (CBS): Ian Eagle, Charles Davis and Evan Washburn
- Recap, Game Book

Game information

**First quarter**

- CLE – Nick Chubb 47-yard run (Cody Parkey kick), 9:29. Browns 7–0. **Drive: 6 plays, 85 yards, 2:41.**

**Second quarter**

- CLE – Cody Parkey 23-yard field goal, 9:45. Browns 10–0. **Drive: 10 plays, 70 yards, 4:20.**
- PIT – Matthew Wright 29-yard field goal, 4:10. Browns 10–3. **Drive: 11 plays, 66 yards, 5:35.**
- PIT – Matthew Wright 46-yard field goal, 1:07. Browns 10–6. **Drive: 8 plays, 48 yards, 1:18.**

**Third quarter**

- PIT – Matthew Wright 46-yard field goal, 8:29. Browns 10–9. **Drive: 7 plays, 52 yards, 2:51.**
- CLE – Austin Hooper 2-yard pass from Baker Mayfield (Cody Parkey kick), 3:48. Browns 17–9. **Drive: 8 plays, 76 yards, 4:41.**

**Fourth quarter**

- CLE – Jarvis Landry 3-yard run (Cody Parkey kick), 14:57. Browns 24–9. **Drive: 4 plays, 20 yards, 1:34.**
- PIT – Chase Claypool 28-yard pass from Mason Rudolph (Matthew Wright kick), 10:07. Browns 24–16. **Drive: 13 plays, 75 yards, 4:50.**
- PIT – JuJu Smith-Schuster 2-yard pass from Mason Rudolph (pass failed), 1:23. Browns 24–22. **Drive: 7 plays, 65 yards, 2:14.**

**Top passers**

- PIT – Mason Rudolph – 22/39, 315 yards, 2 TD, INT
- CLE – Baker Mayfield – 17/27, 196 yards, TD

**Top rushers**

- PIT – James Conner – 9 rushes, 37 yards
- CLE – Nick Chubb – 14 rushes, 108 yards, TD

**Top receivers**

- PIT – Chase Claypool – 5 receptions, 101 yards, TD
- CLE – Rashard Higgins – 2 receptions, 55 yards

After a tough win at home, the Steelers traveled to Cleveland for their regular season finale and Round 2 against the Browns. Having already clinched the AFC North, the Steelers rested many of their starters. In the first quarter, the Browns made it 7–0 after Nick Chubb ran for a 47-yard TD. They then made it 10–0 in the second quarter after Cody Parkey's 23-yard field goal. The Steelers then scored 3 times in a row; Matthew Wright kicked two field goals from 29 and 46 yards out to make it 10–6 at halftime and hit a 46-yarder to make it 10–9 in the third quarter. But the Browns quickly went back ahead by double digits with two touchdowns: Baker Mayfield found Austin Hooper on a 2-yard pass later on in the third, while in the fourth, Jarvis Landry ran for a 3-yarder, making the score 24–9. The Steelers then scored two straight touchdowns of their own: Mason Rudolph found Chase Claypool on a 28-yard pass, followed by JuJu Smith-Schuster catching a 2-yard pass to make it 24–22. After the second touchdown, the Steelers attempted to tie the game by going for a 2-point conversion, but they failed as Mason Rudolph's pass was incomplete. The Steelers defense was unable to stop the Browns with just under two minutes left and the Browns were able to kneel out the clock for the win.

With the loss, the Steelers finished 12–4 and ended up with the #3 seed in the AFC.

=== Standings ===
==== Division ====
AFC North
	W	L	T	PCT	DIV	CONF	PF	PA	STK
^{(3)} Pittsburgh Steelers	12	4	0	.750	4–2	9–3	416	312	L1
^{(5)} Baltimore Ravens	11	5	0	.688	4–2	7–5	468	303	W5
^{(6)} Cleveland Browns	11	5	0	.688	3–3	7–5	408	419	W1
Cincinnati Bengals	4	11	1	.281	1–5	4–8	311	424	L1

==== Conference ====
AFC
#	Team	Division	W	L	T	PCT	DIV	CONF	SOS	SOV	STK
**Division leaders**
1	Kansas City Chiefs	West	14	2	0	.875	4–2	10–2	.465	.464	L1
2	Buffalo Bills	East	13	3	0	.813	6–0	10–2	.512	.471	W6
3	Pittsburgh Steelers	North	12	4	0	.750	4–2	9–3	.475	.448	L1
4 (Note: Tennessee finished ahead of Indianapolis in the AFC South based on division record.)	Tennessee Titans	South	11	5	0	.688	5–1	8–4	.475	.398	W1
**Wild cards**
5 (Note: Baltimore claimed the No. 5 seed over Indianapolis based on head-to-head victory. Division tiebreaker used to eliminate Cleveland (see below).) (Note: Baltimore claimed the No. 5 seed over Cleveland based on head-to-head sweep.)	Baltimore Ravens	North	11	5	0	.688	4–2	7–5	.494	.401	W5
6 (Note: Cleveland claimed the No. 6 seed over Indianapolis based on head-to-head victory.)	Cleveland Browns	North	11	5	0	.688	3–3	7–5	.451	.406	W1
7	Indianapolis Colts	South	11	5	0	.688	4–2	7–5	.443	.384	W1
**Did not qualify for the postseason**
8	Miami Dolphins	East	10	6	0	.625	3–3	7–5	.467	.347	L1
9	Las Vegas Raiders	West	8	8	0	.500	4–2	6–6	.539	.477	W1
10 (Note: New England finished ahead of the LA Chargers based on head-to-head victory.)	New England Patriots	East	7	9	0	.438	3–3	6–6	.527	.429	W1
11	Los Angeles Chargers	West	7	9	0	.438	3–3	6–6	.482	.344	W4
12	Denver Broncos	West	5	11	0	.313	1–5	4–8	.566	.388	L3
13	Cincinnati Bengals	North	4	11	1	.281	1–5	4–8	.529	.438	L1
14	Houston Texans	South	4	12	0	.250	2–4	3–9	.541	.219	L5
15	New York Jets	East	2	14	0	.125	0–6	1–11	.594	.656	L1
16	Jacksonville Jaguars	South	1	15	0	.063	1–5	1–11	.549	.688	L15
**Tiebreakers** (Note: When breaking ties for three or more teams under the NFL's rules, they are first broken within divisions, then comparing only the highest ranked remaining team from each division.)

== Postseason ==
=== Schedule ===
Round	Date	Opponent (seed)	Result	Record	Venue	Recap
Wild Card	January 10, 2021	Cleveland Browns (6)	L 37–48	0–1	Heinz Field	Recap

=== Game summaries ===
==== AFC Wild Card Playoffs: vs. (6) Cleveland Browns ====
AFC Wild Card Playoffs: (6) Cleveland Browns at (3) Pittsburgh Steelers – Game summary

Quarter	1	2	3	4	Total
Browns	28	7	0	13	48
Steelers	0	10	13	14	37

at Heinz Field, Pittsburgh, Pennsylvania

- Date: January 10, 2021
- Game time: 8:15 p.m. EST
- Game weather: Clear, 34 °F (1 °C)
- Game attendance: 0
- Referee: Shawn Smith
- TV announcers (NBC/Peacock): Al Michaels, Cris Collinsworth, Michele Tafoya and Terry McAulay
- Recap, Game Book

Game information

First quarter

- CLE – Karl Joseph fumble recovery in end zone (Cody Parkey kick), 14:46. Browns 7–0.
- CLE – Jarvis Landry 40-yard pass from Baker Mayfield (Cody Parkey kick), 9:46. Browns 14–0. Drive: 3 plays, 46 yards, 0:58.
- CLE – Kareem Hunt 11-yard run (Cody Parkey kick), 4:40. Browns 21–0. Drive: 6 plays, 65 yards, 3:00.
- CLE – Kareem Hunt 8-yard run (Cody Parkey kick), 1:56. Browns 28–0. Drive: 3 plays, 15 yards, 1:22.

Second quarter

- PIT – James Conner 1-yard run (Chris Boswell kick), 1:44. Browns 28–7. Drive: 13 plays, 89 yards, 5:36.
- CLE – Austin Hooper 7-yard pass from Baker Mayfield (Cody Parkey kick), 0:34. Browns 35–7. Drive: 9 plays, 64 yards, 1:10.
- PIT – Chris Boswell 49-yard field goal, 0:00. Browns 35–10. Drive: 5 plays, 37 yards, 0:34.

Third quarter

- PIT – Eric Ebron 17-yard pass from Ben Roethlisberger (pass failed), 7:22. Browns 35–16. Drive: 8 plays, 84 yards, 3:45.
- PIT – JuJu Smith-Schuster 5-yard pass from Ben Roethlisberger (Chris Boswell kick), 2:57. Browns 35–23. Drive: 12 plays, 68 yards, 3:25.

Fourth quarter

- CLE – Nick Chubb 40-yard pass from Baker Mayfield (Cody Parkey kick), 12:32. Browns 42–23. Drive: 6 plays, 80 yards, 2:20.
- PIT – Chase Claypool 29-yard pass from Ben Roethlisberger (pass failed), 11:08. Browns 42–29. Drive: 4 plays, 76 yards, 1:24.
- CLE – Cody Parkey 24-yard field goal, 4:28. Browns 45–29. Drive: 13 plays, 59 yards, 6:40.
- CLE – Cody Parkey 37-yard field goal, 2:51. Browns 48–29. Drive: 4 plays, 6 yards, 0:25.
- PIT – Chase Claypool 7-yard pass from Ben Roethlisberger (Ben Roethlisberger–James Conner pass), 1:09. Browns 48–37. Drive: 8 plays, 77 yards, 1:42.

Top passers

- CLE – Baker Mayfield – 21/34, 263 yards, 3 TD
- PIT – Ben Roethlisberger – 47/68, 501 yards, 4 TD, 4 INT

Top rushers

- CLE – Nick Chubb – 18 rushes, 76 yards
- PIT – James Conner – 11 rushes, 37 yards, TD

Top receivers

- CLE – Jarvis Landry – 5 receptions, 92 yards, TD
- PIT – JuJu Smith-Schuster – 13 receptions, 157 yards, TD

After falling behind 28–0 in the first quarter, the Steelers were knocked out the Wild Card round and lost to the Browns in Pittsburgh for the first time since 2003.

Quarterback Ben Roethlisberger completed an NFL record 47 passes, which passed Drew Bledsoe and Jared Goff's joint record of 45 passes, for 501 yards and 4 touchdowns, but also threw 4 costly interceptions and lost a fumble.

== Awards ==
The following Steelers were awarded for their performances:

=== AFC Offensive Player of the Week/Month ===
W/M	Player	Line
5	WR Chase Claypool	7 rec, 110 yds, 3 TD; 3 rush, 6 yds, 1 TD
10	QB Ben Roethlisberger	27–46, 333 yds, 4 TD

=== AFC Defensive Player of the Week/Month ===
W/M	Player	Line
2	OLB T. J. Watt	4 TKL, 2.5 TFL, 2.5 sacks
Sept.	OLB T. J. Watt	9 TKL, 3 TFL, 3.5 sacks, 2 PD, 1 INT
8	DE Stephon Tuitt	9 TKL, 3 TFL, 2 sacks
Nov.	OLB T. J. Watt	18 TKL, 5 TFL, 5.5 sacks
16	CB Mike Hilton	4 TKL, 2 PD, 1 INT, 1 FR
