= Avery Williamson =

American football player (born 1992)

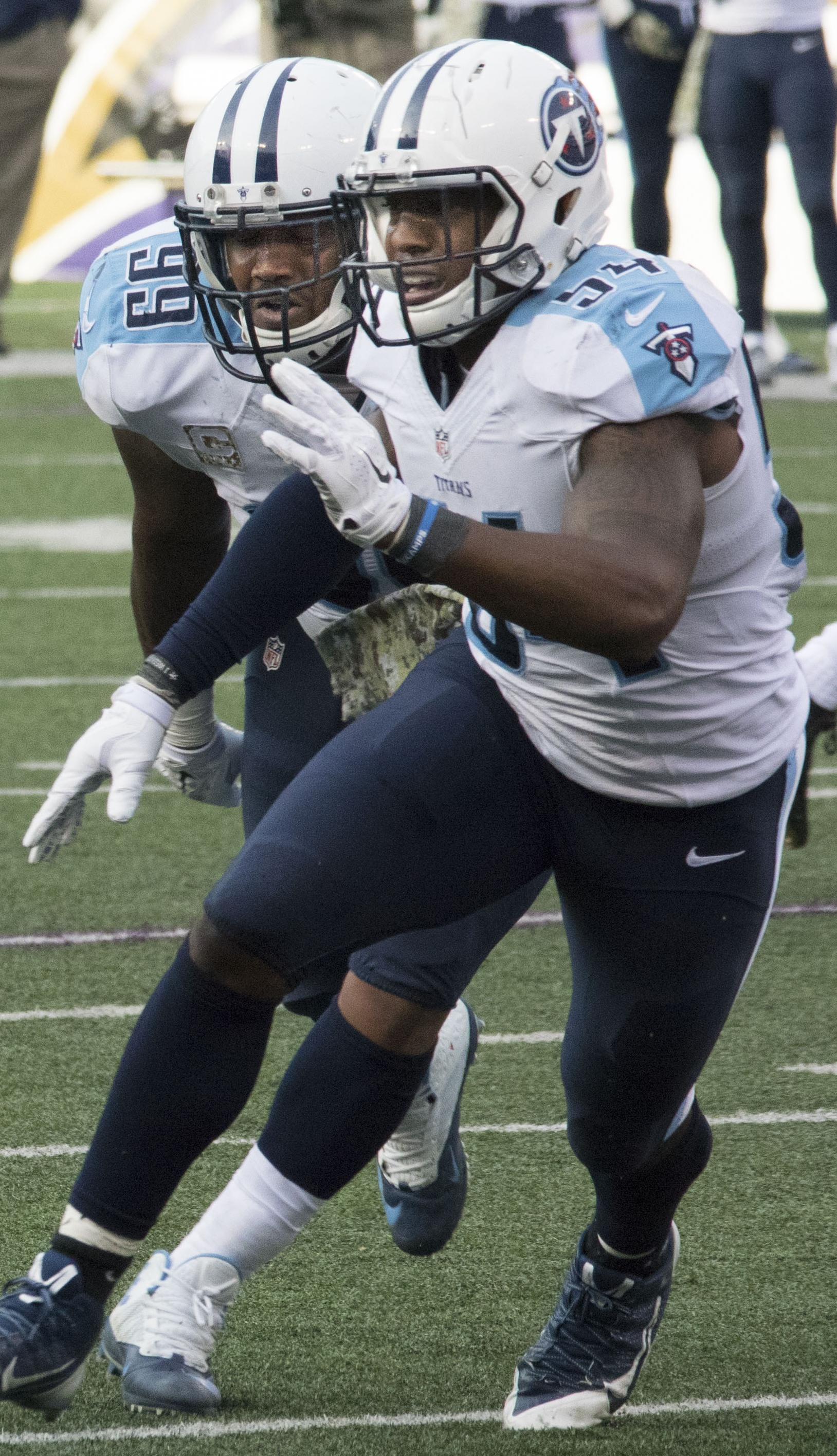
- Williamson (right) with the Tennessee Titans in 2014

No. 54, 51, 53
- Position: Linebacker

Personal information
- Born: March 9, 1992 (age 34); Cleveland, Ohio, U.S.
- Listed height: 6 ft 1 in (1.85 m)
- Listed weight: 246 lb (112 kg)

Career information
- High school: Milan (Milan, Tennessee)
- College: Kentucky (2010–2013)
- NFL draft: 2014: 5th round, 151st overall pick

Career history
- Tennessee Titans (2014–2017); New York Jets (2018–2020); Pittsburgh Steelers (2020); Denver Broncos (2021)*; Tennessee Titans (2021); Denver Broncos (2021)*
- * Offseason or practice squad member only

Awards and highlights
- Second-team All-SEC (2013)

Career NFL statistics
- Total tackles: 607
- Sacks: 15.5
- Forced fumbles: 5
- Fumble recoveries: 3
- Interceptions: 4
- Stats at Pro Football Reference

Avery Milton Williamson (born March 9, 1992) is an American former professional football player who was a linebacker in the National Football League (NFL). He played college football for the Kentucky Wildcats and was selected by the Tennessee Titans in the fifth round of the 2014 NFL draft. Williamson was also a member of the New York Jets, Pittsburgh Steelers, and Denver Broncos.

== Early life ==
Williamson attended Milan High School in Milan, Tennessee, where he led his team to consecutive 14–1 records as a junior and senior (2008 & 2009), losing only in the state championship finals each year to Alcoa High School. He recorded 125 tackles with one interception and also rushed for 416 yards and seven touchdowns. He collected 119 tackles as a junior, including 21 for loss and set a Tennessee state championship game record with 22 tackles in the title contest. He was named the Region Defensive Player of the Year as a junior and senior.

He was rated as a three-star recruit by Rivals.com.

== College career ==
Williamson attended the University of Kentucky from 2010 to 2013. In 2010, he played in all 13 games as a true freshman, totaling 10 tackles and one pass break-up. In 2011, he played in all 12 games, recording 49 tackles. In 2012, he started all 12 games, finishing second in the Southeastern Conference (SEC) with 135 tackles, which placed seventh nationally in total tackles. He also recorded 4.5 tackles for loss, three sacks, four pass breakups, two forced fumbles, one interception and one fumble recovery. In 2013, in his senior season, he recorded 102 tackles, including four for loss, one sack and two fumble recoveries, and was named a second-team All-SEC selection.

Williamson was selected to play in the 2014 NFLPA Collegiate Bowl.

== Professional career ==
=== Pre-draft ===
Williamson was one of 35 collegiate linebackers to attend the NFL Scouting Combine in Indianapolis, Indiana. He completed all of the essential combine drills and finished third among all linebackers in the short shuttle, finished sixth in the 40-yard dash, tied for eighth in the bench press, ninth in the broad jump, and finished 11th in the three-cone drill. On March 14, 2014, Williamson attended Kentucky's pro day, but opted to stand on his combine numbers and only performed positional drills for 20 team representatives and scouts from various NFL teams. During the draft process, he attended a private visit with the Tennessee Titans and Washington Redskins. At the conclusion of the pre-draft process, Williamson was projected to be a fifth or sixth round pick by NFL draft experts and scouts. He was ranked the eighth best inside linebacker prospect in the draft by Matt Miller of Bleacher Report and NFLDraftScout.com. Miller also named Williamson the biggest sleeper amongst all inside linebackers in the draft.

Pre-draft measurables
Height	Weight	Arm length	Hand span	40-yard dash	10-yard split	20-yard split	20-yard shuttle	Three-cone drill	Vertical jump	Broad jump	Bench press
6 ft 1 in (1.85 m)	246 lb (112 kg)	32 3/4 in (0.83 m)	9 1/2 in (0.24 m)	4.66 s	1.61 s	2.71 s	4.07 s	7.11 s	30.5 in (0.77 m)	10 ft 0 in (3.05 m)	25 reps
All values from NFL Combine

=== Tennessee Titans (first stint) ===
==== 2014 ====
The Tennessee Titans selected Williamson in the fifth round (151st overall) of the 2014 NFL draft. He was the 18th linebacker selected in 2014. On May 21, 2014, the Titans signed Williamson to a four-year, $2.41 million contract that includes a signing bonus of $194,452.

Throughout training camp, Williamson competed for a roster spot and a role as a backup linebacker against Moise Fokou, Zaviar Gooden, Colin McCarthy, Patrick Bailey and Brandon Copeland. Head coach Ken Whisenhunt named Williamson the backup inside linebacker behind starters Wesley Woodyard, Zach Brown, and Zaviar Gooden to begin the regular season.

Williamson made his professional regular season debut in the season-opening 26–10 road victory over the Kansas City Chiefs. After being relegated to special teams for the first two weeks, Williams was promoted to the reserve inside linebacker on the defense after starter Zach Brown suffered a torn pectoral in the season-opener. In Week 3, Williamson recorded his first career tackle and made four combined tackles on 13 defensive snaps as the Titans were routed by the Cincinnati Bengals 33–7. On October 5, 2014, Williamson earned his first career start after surpassing Zaviar Gooden on the depth chart. He made seven combined tackles and two pass deflections in the narrow 29–28 loss to the Cleveland Browns. Three weeks later, Williamson made a season-high ten combined tackles, broke up a pass, and recorded his first career sack on quarterback Ryan Fitzpatrick as the Titans were defeated by the Houston Texans 30–16. On November 17, 2014, Williamson recorded eight combined tackles and sacked Ben Roethlisberger twice during a 27–24 loss to the Pittsburgh Steelers. It marked Williamson's first game with multiple sacks.

Williamson finished his rookie year with 79 combined tackles (51 solo), four pass deflections, and three sacks in 16 games and 12 starts.

==== 2015 ====
After finishing the 2014 season with a 2–14 record, head coach Ken Whisenhunt hired Dick LeBeau as the assistant head coach and as the co-defensive coordinator with Ray Horton. Williamson remained as the starting inside linebacker entering camp although Zach Brown returned from injury. He was named the starter, along with Zach Brown and outside linebackers Derrick Morgan and Brian Orakpo, to begin the regular season.

On October 11, 2015, Williamson recorded nine combined tackles and made his first sack of the season on Tyrod Taylor during a narrow 14–13 loss to the Buffalo Bills. Williamson left the game after sustaining a hamstring injury in the fourth quarter and was inactive for the Titans' Week 6 loss to the Miami Dolphins. In Week 7, Williamson recorded five combined tackles, a pass deflection, and made his first career interception off a pass attempt by Matt Ryan during the Titans' 10–7 loss to the Atlanta Falcons. After five consecutive losses head coach Ken Whisenhunt was fired and was replaced with offensive coordinator Mike Mularkey as interim head coach.

On November 15, 2015, Williamson collected a season-high 14 combined tackles (seven solo) and was credited with half a sack on Cam Newton during a 27–10 loss to the Carolina Panthers. Williamson celebrated his sack on Cam Newton with teammate David Bass by performing a rendition of the dance from rapper Drake's music video "Hotline Bling".

Williamson finished his second professional season with 102 combined tackles (63 solo), 3.5 sacks, a pass deflection, and an interception in 15 games and starts.

==== 2016 ====
Head coach Mike Mularkey retained Dick LeBeau and named him the sole coordinator of the defense after Ray Horton opted to accept the defensive coordinator position with the Browns. LeBeau retained Williamson and Woodyard as the starting inside linebackers to begin the regular season after Zach Brown departed for the Bills during free agency.

In Week 3, Williamson recorded nine combined tackles, broke up a pass, and intercepted Derek Carr during a 17–10 loss to the Oakland Raiders. The following week, he recorded a season-high 12 combined tackles in the Titans' 27–20 loss at the Texans. On December 11, 2016, Williamson made three combined tackles and forced the first fumble of his career as Tennessee defeated the Denver Broncos 13–10.

Williamson finished the 2016 season with a career-high 104 combined tackles (73 solo), two sacks, a pass deflection, and an interception in 16 games and starts. The Titans saw significant improvement, going from 3–13 to 9-7 and finishing second in the AFC South, but did not qualify for the playoffs. Williamson received an overall grade of 76.5 from Pro Football Focus, ranking him 41st among all qualified linebackers in overall grade.

==== 2017 ====
Woodyard and Williamson returned as the starting inside linebacker duo along with Derrick Morgan and Brian Orakpo to start the regular season.

On October 22, 2017, Williamson made a career-high tying 14 combined tackles during a 12–9 overtime road victory over the Browns in Week 7. In Week 15, he made six solo tackles and sacked quarterback Jimmy Garoppolo in the narrow 25–23 road loss to the San Francisco 49ers.

Williamson finished the 2017 season with 92 combined tackles (52 solo), three sacks, and two pass break ups in 16 games and starts. The Titans finished second in the AFC South with a 9–7 record and qualified for a Wildcard spot. On January 6, 2018, Williamson started his first career playoff game and recorded one tackle in the narrow 22–21 comeback road victory over the Chiefs in the AFC Wildcard game. The following week, he recorded nine combined tackles and a pass deflection during the Titans' 35–14 loss at the New England Patriots in the AFC Divisional Round.

On January 15, 2018, head coach Mike Mularkey and the Titans agreed to part ways after being unable to come to terms on future plans. Pro Football Focus gave Williamson an overall grade of 85.6, which ranked tenth among all qualifying linebackers in 2017.

=== New York Jets ===
==== 2018 ====
On March 18, 2018, the New York Jets signed Williamson to a three-year, $22.5 million contract with $16 million guaranteed and a signing bonus of $6 million.

Williamson entered training camp slated as a starting inside linebacker. Head coach Todd Bowles named Williamson and Darron Lee the starting inside linebackers to begin the season, alongside outside linebackers Josh Martin and Jordan Jenkins. On September 20, 2018, Williamson collected a season-high 14 combined tackles (eight solo) and made two sacks during a 21–17 loss at the Browns in Week 3. During Week 6, Williamson made five solo tackles, a season-high three pass deflections, and intercepted a pass by Andrew Luck in the 42–34 victory over the Indianapolis Colts.

Williamson started in all 16 games in 2018 and recorded a career-high 120 combined tackles (80 solo), six pass deflections, three sacks, and an interception.

==== 2019–2020 ====
In the second preseason game against the Atlanta Falcons on August 15, Williamson left the game with an apparent knee injury. The next day, it was revealed that he tore his ACL, prematurely ending his season. He was placed on the active/physically unable to perform list at the start of training camp on July 30, 2020. He was activated on August 22, 2020.

In Week 8 of the 2020 season against the Chiefs, Williamson's last game as a Jet, he recorded a team high 9 tackles during the 35–9 loss.

=== Pittsburgh Steelers ===
On November 1, 2020, Williamson was traded to the Steelers along with the Jets' 2022 seventh-round pick for the Steelers' 2022 fifth-round pick. In Week 16 against the Colts, he recorded a team high 14 tackles and sacked Philip Rivers once during the 28–24 comeback victory.

=== Denver Broncos (first stint) ===
On October 5, 2021, Williamson was signed to the Broncos practice squad.

=== Tennessee Titans (second stint) ===
On October 13, 2021, Williamson was signed by the Titans off the Broncos practice squad. On November 2, Williamson was released from the active roster.

=== Denver Broncos (second stint) ===
On November 9, 2021, Williamson was re-signed to the Broncos practice squad. He was released on December 23.

== NFL career statistics ==
Legend
**Bold**	Career high

=== Regular season ===
Year	Team	Games		Tackles					Interceptions					Fumbles			
Year	Team	GP	GS	Cmb	Solo	Ast	Sck	TFL	Int	Yds	TD	Lng	PD	FF	FR	Yds	TD
2014	TEN	**16**	12	78	51	27	3.0	**7**	0	0	0	0	4	0	**2**	**43**	0
2015	TEN	15	15	102	63	39	**3.5**	5	**1**	0	0	0	1	0	0	0	0
2016	TEN	**16**	**16**	104	73	31	2.0	3	**1**	0	0	0	1	1	0	0	0
2017	TEN	**16**	**16**	92	52	**40**	3.0	5	0	0	0	0	2	**2**	0	0	0
2018	NYJ	**16**	**16**	**120**	**80**	**40**	3.0	6	**1**	**36**	0	**36**	**6**	**2**	1	0	0
2020	NYJ	7	6	59	36	23	0.0	0	**1**	21	0	21	3	0	0	0	0
2020	PIT	8	4	52	37	15	1.0	3	0	0	0	0	0	0	0	0	0
2021	TEN	2	0	0	0	0	0.0	0	0	0	0	0	0	0	0	0	0
Career		96	85	607	392	215	15.5	29	4	57	0	36	17	5	3	43	0

=== Playoffs ===
Year	Team	Games		Tackles					Interceptions					Fumbles			
Year	Team	GP	GS	Cmb	Solo	Ast	Sck	TFL	Int	Yds	TD	Lng	PD	FF	FR	Yds	TD
2017	TEN	**2**	**2**	**10**	**4**	**6**	0.0	0	0	0	0	0	**1**	0	0	0	0
2020	PIT	1	0	0	0	0	0.0	0	0	0	0	0	0	0	0	0	0
Career		3	2	10	4	6	0.0	0	0	0	0	0	1	0	0	0	0
