= Robert Spillane =

American football player (born 1995)

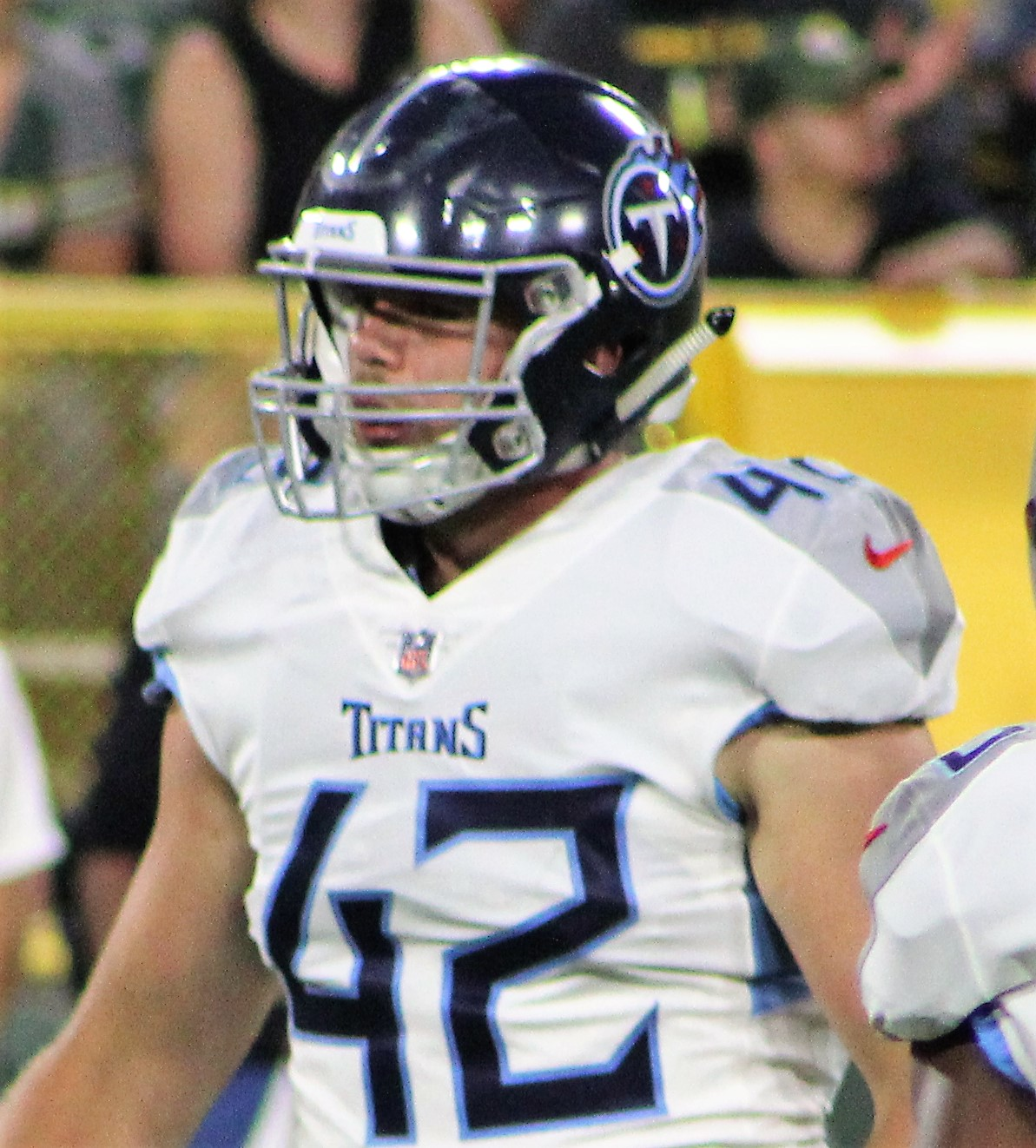
- Spillane with the Tennessee Titans in 2018

No. 14 – New England Patriots
- Position: Linebacker
- Roster status: Active

Personal information
- Born: December 14, 1995 (age 30); Oak Park, Illinois, U.S.
- Listed height: 6 ft 1 in (1.85 m)
- Listed weight: 234 lb (106 kg)

Career information
- High school: Fenwick (Oak Park)
- College: Western Michigan (2014–2017)
- NFL draft: 2018: undrafted

Career history
- Tennessee Titans (2018); Pittsburgh Steelers (2019–2022); Las Vegas Raiders (2023–2024); New England Patriots (2025–present)

Awards and highlights
- 2× Second-team All-MAC (2016, 2017)

Career NFL statistics as of Week 5, 2026
- Total tackles: 628
- Sacks: 9.5
- Forced fumbles: 3
- Fumble recoveries: 2
- Pass deflections: 24
- Interceptions: 8
- Defensive touchdowns: 1
- Stats at Pro Football Reference

John Robert Spillane (born December 14, 1995) is an American professional football linebacker for the New England Patriots of the National Football League (NFL). He played college football for the Western Michigan Broncos.

== Early life ==
Spillane was born and grew up in Oak Park, Illinois, and attended Fenwick High School. He played both running back and linebacker for the football team at Fenwick. Rated a 3-star “athlete” recruit due to his success at multiple positions, Spillane committed to play college football for Western Michigan over offers from Cincinnati, Northern Illinois, Purdue, Syracuse, and Toledo. Spillane was originally recruited to play running back for Western Michigan before eventually switching to linebacker.

== College career ==
Spillane played four seasons for the Western Michigan Broncos, appearing in 47 games (40 starts). During his college career, Spillane accumulated 312 tackles (32.5 for loss), 10 sacks, four interceptions, five pass breakups, three forced fumbles and two fumble recoveries. He was named second-team All-Mid American Conference (MAC) selection in his junior season after recording 111 tackles, including 10.5 for loss, three sacks, three interceptions and two forced fumbles. As a senior, Spillane was again named second-team All-MAC after compiling 88 tackles, 11 for loss, 1.5 sacks and an interception, which he returned 35 yards for a touchdown.

== Professional career ==
Pre-draft measurables
Height	Weight	Arm length	Hand span	Wingspan	40-yard dash	10-yard split	20-yard split	20-yard shuttle	Three-cone drill	Vertical jump	Broad jump	Bench press
6 ft 1 1/4 in (1.86 m)	229 lb (104 kg)	32 1/2 in (0.83 m)	9 1/4 in (0.23 m)	6 ft 3 3/4 in (1.92 m)	4.77 s	1.73 s	2.79 s	4.40 s	7.13 s	32 1/2 in (0.83 m)	9 ft 2 in (2.79 m)	10 reps
All values from Western Michigan's Pro Day

=== Tennessee Titans ===
Spillane signed with the Tennessee Titans as an undrafted free agent on May 14, 2018. He was cut from the 53-man roster at the end of training camp and subsequently re-signed to the Titans practice squad on September 2. Spillane was promoted to the Titans active roster on October 9, 2018. He made his NFL debut on October 14 in a 21–0 loss to the Baltimore Ravens. Spillane was waived by the Titans on October 29, 2018.

=== Pittsburgh Steelers ===
On February 8, 2019, Spillane was signed by the Pittsburgh Steelers. He was waived on August 31, 2019, and was signed to the practice squad the next day. He was released on September 24, 2019, but re-signed on October 8. He was promoted to the active roster on November 5. Spillane finished the season with 11 tackles in eight games played.

On October 18, 2020, against the Cleveland Browns, Steelers starting inside linebacker Devin Bush Jr. tore his ACL. Spillane replaced Bush and finished the game with 5 tackles. On October 20, Steelers Coach Mike Tomlin announced that Spillane would be the starter for the remainder of the season. In Week 8 of the 2020 season, Spillane intercepted a pass from Baltimore Ravens' quarterback Lamar Jackson and returned it for a 33 yard touchdown during the 28–24 win. This was Spillane's first turnover and touchdown of his career and he also finished the game with a team-high 11 tackles and a fumble recovery. In Week 10 against the Cincinnati Bengals, Spillane recorded his first career sack on rookie quarterback Joe Burrow during the 36–10 win. He was placed on injured reserve on December 12, 2020. He was activated from injured reserve on January 9, 2021. In the 2020 season, Spillane finished with two sacks, 45 total tackles, one interception, and four passes defended.

Spillane re-signed with the Steelers on a one-year contract on March 24, 2021. In the 2021 season, Spillane finished with 56 total tackles in 14 games and four starts. In the 2022 season, Spillane finished with one sack, 79 total tackles, and four passes defended in 16 games and five starts.

On March 11, 2022, the Steelers placed a restricted free agent tender on Spillane.

=== Las Vegas Raiders ===
On March 16, 2023, Spillane signed a two-year contract with the Las Vegas Raiders. In Week 10, he recorded seven tackles, a sack, and an interception in a 16–12 win over the Jets, earning AFC Defensive Player of the Week. In the 2023 season, he had 3.5 sacks, 148 total tackles (82 solo), three interceptions, four passes defended, one forced fumble, and one fumble recovery.

In the 2024 season, Spillane had two sacks, 158 total tackles (91 solo), two interceptions, and seven passes defended. His 158 total tackles tied for third in the NFL.

=== New England Patriots ===
On March 13, 2025, Spillane signed a three-year, $33 million contract with the New England Patriots. In the 2025 season, he finished with one sack, 97 total tackles (48 solo), two interceptions, and five passes defended. He had four total tackles in Super Bowl LX, a 29–13 loss to the Seattle Seahawks.

== NFL career statistics ==
Legend
**Bold**	Career high

=== Regular season ===
Year	Team	Games		Tackles						Interceptions						Fumbles	
Year	Team	GP	GS	Cmb	Solo	Ast	Sck	TFL	Sfty	PD	Int	Yds	Avg	Lng	TD	FF	FR
2018	TEN	2	0	0	0	0	0.0	0	0	0	0	0	0.0	0	0	0	0
2019	PIT	8	0	11	8	3	0.0	0	0	0	0	0	0.0	0	0	0	0
2020	PIT	12	7	45	39	6	2.0	4	0	4	1	33	33.0	33	**1**	0	**1**
2021	PIT	14	4	56	29	27	0.0	2	0	0	0	0	0.0	0	0	0	0
2022	PIT	16	5	79	52	27	1.0	4	0	4	0	0	0.0	0	0	0	0
2023	LV	**17**	**17**	148	82	66	**3.5**	7	0	4	**3**	53	17.7	25	0	**1**	**1**
2024	LV	**17**	**17**	**158**	**91**	**67**	2.0	**10**	0	**7**	2	0	0.0	0	0	0	0
2025	NE	13	13	97	48	49	1.0	4	0	5	2	**70**	**35.0**	**37**	0	**1**	0
2026	NE	5	5	34	18	16	0.0	0	0	0	0	0	0.0	0	0	1	0
Career		104	68	628	367	261	9.5	31	0	24	8	156	19.5	37	1	3	2

=== Postseason ===
Year	Team	Games		Tackles						Interceptions						Fumbles	
Year	Team	GP	GS	Cmb	Solo	Ast	Sck	TFL	Sfty	PD	Int	Yds	Avg	Lng	TD	FF	FR
2020	PIT	1	1	9	**6**	3	0.0	0	0	0	0	–	–	–	–	0	0
2021	PIT	1	1	5	5	0	0.0	0	0	0	0	–	–	–	–	0	0
2025	NE	**4**	**4**	**18**	**6**	**12**	0.0	0	0	**2**	0	–	–	–	–	0	0
Career		6	6	32	17	15	0.0	0	0	2	0	–	–	–	–	0	0

== Personal life ==
Spillane is the grandson of 1953 Heisman Trophy winner, College Football Hall of Famer and NFL halfback Johnny Lattner.
