= Justin Kavanaugh =

Personal information
- Nickname: Coach Kav
- Nationality: United States
- Occupations: Coach, author, entrepreneur
- Website: www.coachkav.com

Achievements and titles
- Olympic finals: Head Coach of Saint Kitts and Nevis in 2021

Justin Kavanaugh is an American coach, author and entrepreneur. He trained Nick Mayhugh to "re-learn how to run" after Mayhugh switched to the track and field Paralympic program from soccer which was not offered at the 2020 Summer Paralympics. Mayhugh was a three-time gold medalist in Tokyo. Other athletes he trained include Trey Edmunds, Tremaine Edmunds, Sammis Reyes and Keenan Reynolds, among others.

He is the founder and chief executive officer of The Sport and Speed Institute, a fitness training facility located in Chantilly, Virginia.

Kavanaugh was a head coach for Saint Kitts and Nevis at the Olympics in Tokyo.

== Bibliography ==
- Kavanaugh, Justin (2017). Man Up: The 5 Areas of Focus to Guarantee Your Athletic Success. CreateSpace Independent Publishing Platform. ISBN 9781547275922.
