= 2023 NFL season =

American football season

Regular season
- Duration: September 7, 2023 – January 7, 2024

Playoffs
- Start date: January 13, 2024
- AFC Champions: Kansas City Chiefs
- NFC Champions: San Francisco 49ers

Super Bowl LVIII
- Date: February 11, 2024
- Site: Allegiant Stadium, Paradise, Nevada
- Champions: Kansas City Chiefs

Pro Bowl
- Date: February 4, 2024
- Site: Camping World Stadium, Orlando, Florida

AFC teams: West, North, South, East
NFC teams: West, North, South, East

The 2023 NFL season was the 104th season of the National Football League (NFL). The regular season began on September 7, 2023, with defending Super Bowl LVII champion Kansas City losing to Detroit in the NFL Kickoff Game, and ended on January 7, 2024.

The playoffs started on January 13 and concluded with Super Bowl LVIII, the league's championship game, at Allegiant Stadium in Paradise, Nevada, on February 11, 2024. Kansas City defeated San Francisco in overtime, becoming the first team since the 2004 New England Patriots to win back-to-back Super Bowls.

This was the first season since 1935 in which every team in a division (in this case the AFC North) finished with a winning record.

== Player movement ==
The 2023 NFL league year and trading period began on March 15. On March 13, teams were allowed to exercise options for 2023 on players with option clauses in their contracts, submit qualifying offers to their pending restricted free agents, and submit a Minimum Salary Tender to retain exclusive negotiating rights to their players with expiring 2022 contracts and fewer than three accrued seasons of free agent credit. Teams were required to be under the salary cap using the "top 51" definition (in which the 51 highest paid-players on the team's payroll must have a combined salary cap). On March 15, clubs were allowed to contact and begin contract negotiations with players whose contracts had expired and thus became unrestricted free agents.

This season's salary cap increased to $224.8 million per team, up from $208.2 million in 2022.

Positions key
Offense	Defense	Special teams
QB — Quarterback; RB — Running back; FB — Fullback; WR — Wide receiver; TE — Tight end; OL — Offensive lineman; T — Tackle; G — Guard; C — Center	DL — Defensive lineman; DT — Defensive tackle (Note: Includes nose tackle (NT)); DE — Defensive end; EDGE — Edge rusher; LB — Linebacker (Note: Includes middle linebacker (MLB/MIKE), weakside linebacker (WILL), strongside linebacker (SAM), off-ball linebacker, and outside linebacker (OLB)); DB — Defensive back; CB — Cornerback; S — Safety (Note: Includes free safety (FS) and strong safety (SS))	K — Kicker (Note: Also known as a placekicker (PK)); P — Punter; LS — Long snapper; RS — Return specialist (Note: Includes kickoff and punt returners)

=== Free agency ===
Free agency began on March 15. Notable players to change teams included:

- Quarterbacks Jacoby Brissett (Cleveland to Washington), Derek Carr (Las Vegas to New Orleans), Andy Dalton (New Orleans to Carolina), Jimmy Garoppolo (San Francisco to Las Vegas), Taylor Heinicke (Washington to Atlanta), and Baker Mayfield (Los Angeles Rams to Tampa Bay)
- Running backs Dalvin Cook (Minnesota to New York Jets), Ezekiel Elliott (Dallas to New England), Melvin Gordon (Kansas City to Baltimore), Damien Harris (New England to Buffalo), David Montgomery (Chicago to Detroit), Latavius Murray (Denver to Buffalo), Miles Sanders (Philadelphia to Carolina), Devin Singletary (Buffalo to Houston), and Jamaal Williams (Detroit to New Orleans)
- Wide receivers Nelson Agholor (New England to Baltimore), Odell Beckham Jr. (Los Angeles Rams to Baltimore), D. J. Chark (Detroit to Carolina), DeAndre Hopkins (Arizona to Tennessee), Allen Lazard (Green Bay to New York Jets), Jakobi Meyers (New England to Las Vegas), JuJu Smith-Schuster (Kansas City to New England), Adam Thielen (Minnesota to Carolina), and Robert Woods (Tennessee to Houston)
- Tight ends Mike Gesicki (Miami to New England), Austin Hooper (Tennessee to Las Vegas), Hayden Hurst (Cincinnati to Carolina), Dalton Schultz (Dallas to Houston), and Robert Tonyan (Green Bay to Chicago)
- Offensive linemen Orlando Brown Jr. (Kansas City to Cincinnati), Cody Ford (Arizona to Cincinnati), Nate Davis (Tennessee to Chicago), Mike McGlinchey (San Francisco to Denver), Connor McGovern (Dallas to Buffalo), Ben Powers (Baltimore to Denver), Donovan Smith (Tampa Bay to Kansas City), Jawaan Taylor (Jacksonville to Kansas City), and Andrew Wylie (Kansas City to Washington)
- Defensive linemen Zach Allen (Arizona to Denver), Calais Campbell (Baltimore to Atlanta), Marcus Davenport (New Orleans to Minnesota), Javon Hargrave (Philadelphia to San Francisco), Dre'Mont Jones (Denver to Seattle), Yannick Ngakoue (Indianapolis to Chicago), David Onyemata (New Orleans to Atlanta), and Dalvin Tomlinson (Minnesota to Cleveland)
- Linebackers Frank Clark (Kansas City to Denver), Tremaine Edmunds (Buffalo to Chicago), T. J. Edwards (Philadelphia to Chicago), Leonard Floyd (Los Angeles Rams to Buffalo), Eric Kendricks (Minnesota to Los Angeles Chargers), and Bobby Wagner (Los Angeles Rams to Seattle)
- Defensive backs Adrian Amos (Green Bay to New York Jets), Jessie Bates (Cincinnati to Atlanta), C. J. Gardner-Johnson (Philadelphia to Detroit), Byron Murphy (Arizona to Minnesota), Marcus Peters (Baltimore to Las Vegas), Patrick Peterson (Minnesota to Pittsburgh), Cameron Sutton (Pittsburgh to Detroit), Juan Thornhill (Kansas City to Cleveland), and Jimmie Ward (San Francisco to Houston)
- Kickers Matt Gay (Los Angeles Rams to Indianapolis) and Brandon McManus (Denver to Jacksonville)
- Punters Jake Bailey (New England to Miami) and Riley Dixon (Los Angeles Rams to Denver)

=== Trades ===
The following notable trades were made during the 2023 league year:

- March 15: The Los Angeles Rams traded CB Jalen Ramsey to Miami in exchange for TE Hunter Long and a 2023 third-round selection.
- March 15: Indianapolis traded CB Stephon Gilmore to Dallas in exchange for a 2023 fifth-round selection.
- March 15: Las Vegas traded TE Darren Waller to the New York Giants in exchange for a 2023 third-round selection.
- March 15: Carolina traded WR D. J. Moore, 2023 first and second-round selections (Nos. 9 and 61), a 2024 first-round selection, and a 2025 second-round selection to Chicago in exchange for a 2023 first-round selection (No. 1).
- March 22: The New York Jets traded WR Elijah Moore and a 2023 third-round selection to Cleveland in exchange for a 2023 second-round selection.
- April 19: The Los Angeles Rams traded WR Allen Robinson and a 2023 seventh-round selection to Pittsburgh in exchange for a 2023 seventh-round selection.
- April 24: Green Bay traded QB Aaron Rodgers and 2023 first and fifth-round selections to the New York Jets in exchange for 2023 first, second, and sixth-round selections, and a conditional 2024 second-round selection.
- April 29: Detroit traded RB D'Andre Swift and a 2023 seventh-round selection to Philadelphia in exchange for 2023 seventh and 2025 fourth-round selections.
- May 16: Minnesota traded DE Za'Darius Smith along with 2025 sixth and seventh-round selections to Cleveland in exchange for 2024 and 2025 fifth-round selections.
- August 25: San Francisco traded QB Trey Lance to Dallas in exchange for a 2024 fourth-round selection.
- August 27: Cleveland traded OT Tyrone Wheatley Jr. to New England in exchange for RB Pierre Strong Jr.
- August 27: Pittsburgh traded G Kevin Dotson and 2024 fifth and 2025 sixth-round selections to the Los Angeles Rams in exchange for 2024 fourth and 2025 fifth-round selections.
- August 29: New Orleans traded K Wil Lutz to Denver in exchange for a 2024 seventh-round selection.
- August 29: New England traded K Nick Folk to Tennessee in exchange for a 2025 seventh-round selection.
- August 29: Miami traded CB Noah Igbinoghene to Dallas in exchange for CB Kelvin Joseph.
- October 4: The Los Angeles Chargers traded CB J. C. Jackson and a 2025 seventh-round selection to New England in exchange for a 2025 sixth-round selection.
- October 18: The New York Jets traded WR Mecole Hardman and a 2025 seventh-round selection to Kansas City in exchange for a 2025 sixth-round selection.
- October 23: Tennessee traded S Kevin Byard to Philadelphia in exchange for S Terrell Edmunds and 2024 fifth and sixth-round selections.
- October 30: The New York Giants traded DE Leonard Williams to Seattle in exchange for 2024 second and 2025 fifth-round selections.
- October 31: Washington traded DE Montez Sweat to Chicago in exchange for a 2024 second-round selection.
- October 31: Washington traded DE Chase Young to San Francisco in exchange for a 2024 third-round selection.
- October 31: Green Bay traded CB Rasul Douglas and a 2024 fifth-round selection to Buffalo in exchange for a 2024 third-round selection.

=== Retirements ===
Notable retirements

- QB Tom Brady – Fifteen-time Pro Bowler, six-time All-Pro (three first-team, three second-team), seven-time Super Bowl champion (XXXVI, XXXVIII, XXXIX, XLIX, LI, LIII, and LV), five-time Super Bowl MVP (XXXVI, XXXVIII, XLIX, LI, and LV), three-time NFL MVP (2007, 2010, and 2017), two-time Offensive Player of the Year (2007 and 2010), and 2009 Comeback Player of the Year. Played for New England and Tampa Bay during his 23-year career.
- WR A. J. Green – Seven-time Pro Bowler and two-time second-team All-Pro. Played for Cincinnati and Arizona during his 12-year career.
- DT Gerald McCoy – Six-time Pro Bowler and three-time All-Pro (one first-team, two second-team). Played for Tampa Bay, Carolina, and Las Vegas during his 12-year career.
- DE J. J. Watt – Five-time Pro Bowler, seven-time All-Pro (five first-team, two second-team), three-time Defensive Player of the Year (2012, 2014, and 2015), and 2017 Walter Payton Man of the Year. Played for Houston and Arizona during his 12-year career.

Other retirements

- Nasir Adderley
- Chris Banjo
- Giovani Bernard
- Jared Bernhardt
- Austin Blythe
- Josh Bynes
- Jamie Collins
- Brandon Copeland
- Chase Daniel
- Corey Davis
- Donte Deayon
- Laurent Duvernay-Tardif
- Trey Edmunds
- Ben Ellefson
- Mike Glennon
- Robbie Gould
- Chad Henne
- Dont'a Hightower
- Jeremy Hill
- Kevin Huber
- Mark Ingram II
- Myles Jack
- DeSean Jackson
- Justin Jackson
- Malik Jackson
- Tony Jefferson
- Brett Kern
- Christian Kirksey
- Josh Lambo
- Blake Martinez
- Devin McCourty
- Sony Michel
- Alec Ogletree
- Russell Okung
- Corey Peters
- John Ross
- Chase Roullier
- Kyle Rudolph
- Brandon Shell
- Aldon Smith
- Davis Webb
- Eli Wolf
- Jabari Zuniga

=== Draft ===
The 2023 NFL draft was held outside Union Station in Kansas City, Missouri, on April 27–29. Chicago, by virtue of having the worst record in 2022, was awarded the first overall selection. However, it was traded to Carolina, who selected quarterback Bryce Young out of Alabama.

== 2023 deaths ==
=== Pro Football Hall of Fame members ===
Bobby Beathard
Beathard was the general manager of the Washington Redskins from 1978 to 1989 and the San Diego Chargers from 1990 to 2000, as well as serving as the Miami Dolphins' director of player personnel from 1972 to 1977, and was inducted into the Hall of Fame in 2018. He was a four-time Super Bowl champion (VII, VIII, XVII, and XXII). He died on January 30, age 86.
Gil Brandt
Brandt was the vice president of player personnel for the Dallas Cowboys from 1960 to 1988, as well as serving in executive roles with the Los Angeles Rams 1955 to 1957 and the San Francisco 49ers from 1958 to 1959, helped create the NFL Scouting Combine, and was inducted into the Hall of Fame in 2019. He was a two-time Super Bowl champion (VI and XII). He died on August 31, age 91.
Bob Brown
Brown played ten seasons in the NFL as an offensive tackle with the Philadelphia Eagles, Los Angeles Rams, and Oakland Raiders, and was inducted into the Hall of Fame in 2004. He was a six-time Pro Bowler and nine-time All-Pro (five first-team, four second-team). He died on June 16, age 81.
Jim Brown
Brown played nine seasons in the NFL as a fullback with the Cleveland Browns, and was inducted into the Hall of Fame in 1971. He was a nine-time Pro Bowler, nine-time All-Pro (eight first-team, one second-team), three-time NFL MVP, and 1964 NFL Champion. He died on May 18, age 87.
Dick Butkus
Butkus played nine seasons in the NFL as a linebacker with the Chicago Bears, and was inducted into the Hall of Fame in 1979. He was an eight-time Pro Bowler, eight-time All-Pro (five first-team, three second-team), and two-time NFL Defensive Player of the Year. He died on October 5, age 80.
Bud Grant
Grant was the head coach of the Minnesota Vikings from 1967 to 1983 and the 1985 season. He won an NFL championship with the Vikings in 1969 and NFC championships in 1973, 1974 and 1976, and was inducted into the Hall of Fame in 1994. He died on March 11, age 95.
Art McNally
McNally was the director of officiating for the NFL from 1968 to 1991. He was inducted into the Hall of Fame in 2022, becoming the first official to receive the honor. He died on January 1, age 97.
Dave Wilcox
Wilcox played 11 seasons in the NFL as a linebacker with the San Francisco 49ers, and was inducted into the Hall of Fame in 2000. He was a seven-time Pro Bowler and four-time All-Pro (two first-team, two second-team). He died on April 19, age 80.

=== Active personnel ===
- Norma Hunt, Kansas City Chiefs co-owner (minority) since 2006, widow of Chiefs and American Football League founder Lamar Hunt and mother of Chiefs chairman and CEO Clark Hunt. Won two Super Bowls (LIV and LVII) as co-owner. She died on June 4, age 85.

== Rule changes ==
The following rule changes for the 2023 season were approved at the NFL Owners' Meeting on March 28:

- The jersey numbering system was modified to allow the number 0 to be worn by all positions previously allowed to wear single-digit numbers. Placekickers and punters are now allowed to wear numbers 0–49 and 90–99. Previously 0 was not permitted to be used after the jersey numbering system was standardized in 1973 and kickers and punters could only wear numbers 1–19.
- Timing rules were modified after a ruling on the field is reversed. If outside the two-minute warning, the play clock will be set to 40 seconds instead of 25. If inside the two minute warning and a 10-second runoff is used, the play clock would be set to 30 seconds.
- Plays resulting in a turnover on downs were added to the list of booth reviewable plays (not challengeable by coaches). Plays resulting in a successful first down are still challengeable outside of the two minute warning.
- Tripping was upgraded to a personal foul (15 yards) from its current 10 yard penalty, reverting a rule change from 1974.
- Launching from one foot to attack an opponent became illegal, changing the current rule of both feet.
- Illegally handing the ball forward behind the line of scrimmage (such as a quarterback handing the ball forward to an offensive lineman to avoid a sack) is now a loss of down, consistent with the same foul occurring beyond the line of scrimmage.
- All illegal kicks (beyond the line of scrimmage or after the ball returns behind the line) are now penalized the same as an illegal forward pass (five yards and loss of down).
- If the offense commits a live-ball penalty and the defense commits a dead-ball penalty on the last play of either half, the period will not be extended for an untimed down.
- Language referring to "butt, ram, or spear" with the helmet was combined under the umbrella of "impermissible uses of the helmet" and clarified legal incidental contact.

During the May Owners Meeting, the following bylaw and rule changes was made:

- Teams will now be able to have a third quarterback available on game days without occupying a roster spot. The third quarterback will be available if the team's first two quarterbacks are either injured or disqualified. If one of the two regular quarterbacks return to the game, the third will return to the bench unless both quarterbacks are again unavailable for the same reasons.
- On kickoffs, a fair catch made at or behind the 25 yard line will be awarded at the 25 yard line, mirroring the college football rule adopted in 2018.

== Preseason ==
The majority of training camps opened on July 26. The preseason began on August 3 with the Pro Football Hall of Fame Game, in which Cleveland (represented in the Hall of Fame Class of 2023 by Joe Thomas) defeated the New York Jets (represented by Joe Klecko and Darrelle Revis).

== Regular season ==
The season was played over an 18-week schedule beginning on September 7. Each of the league's 32 teams played 17 games, with one bye week for each team. The regular season ended on January 7, 2024; all games during the final weekend were intra-division games, as it has been since 2010.

Each team played the other three teams in its own division twice, one game against each of the four teams from a division in its own conference, one game against each of the four teams from a division in the other conference, one game against each of the remaining two teams in its conference that finished in the same position in their respective divisions the previous season (e.g., the team that finished fourth in its division would play all three other teams in its conference that also finished fourth in their divisions), and one game against a team in another division in the other conference that also finished in the same position in their respective division the previous season. This was the first regular season since 2017 in which no games ended in a tie.

The division pairings for 2023 were as follows:

Four intra-conference games
AFC East vs AFC West
AFC North vs AFC South
NFC East vs NFC West
NFC North vs NFC South

Four interconference games
AFC East vs. NFC East
AFC North vs. NFC West
AFC South vs. NFC South
AFC West vs. NFC North

Interconference game by 2022 position
NFC East at AFC West
NFC North at AFC North
NFC South at AFC East
NFC West at AFC South

Highlights of the 2023 season included:

- NFL Kickoff Game: The 2023 season began with the Kickoff Game on September 7 in primetime, with Detroit defeating defending Super Bowl LVII champion Kansas City.
- NFL International Series: On May 10, the league announced a five-game international slate for 2023. Three games were played in London, England: Atlanta at Jacksonville at Wembley Stadium (marking the second year under a three-year deal in which Jacksonville will host a game at Wembley), on October 1, Jacksonville at Buffalo on October 8 at Tottenham Hotspur Stadium, and Baltimore at Tennessee on October 15 at Tottenham. The league also staged two games at Deutsche Bank Park in Frankfurt, Germany, that marked the NFL's first games in the city: Miami at Kansas City on November 5 and Indianapolis at New England on November 12. All games were scheduled for 9:30 a.m. ET starts. Jacksonville (twice), Baltimore, Kansas City, and Indianapolis won the games.
- Thanksgiving: Three games were played on Thursday, November 23, with Green Bay at Detroit and Washington at Dallas in the traditional afternoon doubleheader, and San Francisco at Seattle in the nightcap. Green Bay, Dallas, and San Francisco, won.
- Christmas: Christmas Day, December 25, landed on a Monday. While the normal Sunday afternoon slate of games were played on Christmas Eve, usual Sunday night broadcaster NBC decided to broadcast a game on Saturday afternoon prior to the game on December 23 therefore the Sunday night game (New England at Denver) aired on NFL Network instead. Three games were scheduled for Christmas Day: Las Vegas at Kansas City, the New York Giants at Philadelphia, and the regular Monday Night Football game: Baltimore at San Francisco. New England, Las Vegas, Philadelphia, and Baltimore won the games.

=== Changes to flexible scheduling rules ===
As part of new media agreements that were signed by the networks in 2021, the league's flexible scheduling system expanded this season to include Monday Night Football games, and increased the number of cross-flexing (switching) of Sunday afternoon games between CBS and Fox. In May 2023, league owners passed flex scheduling rules for Thursday Night Football as well, only as a trial basis for this season. However, with no games being flexed in 2023, this rule will carry over to 2024.

In 2023, any Monday Night Football game was allowed to be flexed between weeks 12 and 17, provided that the league announced its rescheduling no later than 12 days before the contests. For Sunday Night Football, no more than three games could be flexed between weeks 5 and 14, while any game between weeks 15 to 17 could be flexed; the league was required to give weeks 5 to 13 SNF games a 12-day notice, and weeks 14 to 17 a 6-day notice. For Thursday Night Football, only two games could be flexed between weeks 13 and 17, teams were not allowed play two away TNF games during season, the same team could not be flexed into TNF both times, and the league was required to give a 28-day notice.

CBS and Fox were still able to protect games from being moved, whether from a change to another network or a change of the Sunday afternoon time slot. When the initial season schedule was created, the two networks selected a limited number of games involving a specific number of teams from their respective conference. Otherwise every game can be initially scheduled on any network regardless of conference. After the season started, the two networks were allowed to protect one game each week from getting flexed.

=== Scheduling changes ===
Week 6:

- The Detroit–Tampa Bay game was moved from 1:00 p.m. ET to 4:25 p.m. ET, remaining on Fox.

Week 13:

- The Denver–Houston game was moved from 4:05 p.m. ET to 1:00 p.m. ET, trading time slots with the Carolina–Tampa Bay game; both games remaining on CBS.

Week 15:

- On November 30, the NFL announced that three games were moved to Saturday as part of an NFL Network tripleheader: Minnesota–Cincinnati at 1:00 p.m. ET, Pittsburgh–Indianapolis at 4:30 p.m. ET, and Denver–Detroit at 8:15 p.m. ET. The two other games that the league had the option of scheduling on Saturday, Atlanta–Carolina and Chicago–Cleveland, were both scheduled on Sunday afternoon.
- The Tampa Bay–Green Bay game, was cross-flexed from Fox to CBS, remaining at 1:00 p.m. ET.
- The Philadelphia–Seattle game, originally scheduled for Sunday at 4:25 p.m. on Fox, was flexed into Monday Night Football at 8:15 p.m. ET, replacing the originally scheduled Kansas City–New England game, which was moved to Sunday at 1:00 p.m. ET on Fox.

Week 18:

- All Week 18 games were initially listed with a kickoff time of "TBD" and the schedule was released on December 31 after the Sunday games of Week 17 was completed.

- Two games with playoff implications were moved to a Saturday doubleheader on ESPN and ABC. Pittsburgh–Baltimore at 4:30 pm ET and Houston–Indianapolis at 8:15 pm ET.
- The Buffalo–Miami game, which decided the AFC East champion, was moved to the final Sunday Night Football game at 8:20 pm ET on NBC.
- All remaining games were scheduled on Sunday afternoon at either 1:00 or 4:25 pm ET on either CBS or Fox.

== Regular season standings ==
=== Division ===
AFC East
	W	L	T	PCT	DIV	CONF	PF	PA	STK
^{(2)} Buffalo Bills	11	6	0	.647	4–2	7–5	451	311	W5
^{(6)} Miami Dolphins	11	6	0	.647	4–2	7–5	496	391	L2
New York Jets	7	10	0	.412	2–4	4–8	268	355	W1
New England Patriots	4	13	0	.235	2–4	4–8	236	366	L2

AFC North
	W	L	T	PCT	DIV	CONF	PF	PA	STK
^{(1)} Baltimore Ravens	13	4	0	.765	3–3	8–4	483	280	L1
^{(5)} Cleveland Browns	11	6	0	.647	3–3	8–4	396	362	L1
^{(7)} Pittsburgh Steelers	10	7	0	.588	5–1	7–5	304	324	W3
Cincinnati Bengals	9	8	0	.529	1–5	4–8	366	384	W1

AFC South
	W	L	T	PCT	DIV	CONF	PF	PA	STK
^{(4)} Houston Texans	10	7	0	.588	4–2	7–5	377	353	W2
Jacksonville Jaguars	9	8	0	.529	4–2	6–6	377	371	L1
Indianapolis Colts	9	8	0	.529	3–3	7–5	396	415	L1
Tennessee Titans	6	11	0	.353	1–5	4–8	305	367	W1

AFC West
	W	L	T	PCT	DIV	CONF	PF	PA	STK
^{(3)} Kansas City Chiefs	11	6	0	.647	4–2	9–3	371	294	W2
Las Vegas Raiders	8	9	0	.471	4–2	6–6	332	331	W1
Denver Broncos	8	9	0	.471	3–3	5–7	357	413	L1
Los Angeles Chargers	5	12	0	.294	1–5	3–9	346	398	L5

NFC East
	W	L	T	PCT	DIV	CONF	PF	PA	STK
^{(2)} Dallas Cowboys	12	5	0	.706	5–1	9–3	509	315	W2
^{(5)} Philadelphia Eagles	11	6	0	.647	4–2	7–5	433	428	L2
New York Giants	6	11	0	.353	3–3	5–7	266	407	W1
Washington Commanders	4	13	0	.235	0–6	2–10	329	518	L8

NFC North
	W	L	T	PCT	DIV	CONF	PF	PA	STK
^{(3)} Detroit Lions	12	5	0	.706	4–2	8–4	461	395	W1
^{(7)} Green Bay Packers	9	8	0	.529	4–2	7–5	383	350	W3
Minnesota Vikings	7	10	0	.412	2–4	6–6	344	362	L4
Chicago Bears	7	10	0	.412	2–4	6–6	360	379	L1

NFC South
	W	L	T	PCT	DIV	CONF	PF	PA	STK
^{(4)} Tampa Bay Buccaneers	9	8	0	.529	4–2	7–5	348	325	W1
New Orleans Saints	9	8	0	.529	4–2	6–6	402	327	W2
Atlanta Falcons	7	10	0	.412	3–3	4–8	321	373	L2
Carolina Panthers	2	15	0	.118	1–5	1–11	236	416	L3

NFC West
	W	L	T	PCT	DIV	CONF	PF	PA	STK
^{(1)} San Francisco 49ers	12	5	0	.706	5–1	10–2	491	298	L1
^{(6)} Los Angeles Rams	10	7	0	.588	5–1	8–4	404	377	W4
Seattle Seahawks	9	8	0	.529	2–4	7–5	364	402	W1
Arizona Cardinals	4	13	0	.235	0–6	3–9	330	455	L1

=== Conference ===
AFC
#	Team	Division	W	L	T	PCT	DIV	CONF	SOS	SOV	STK
Division leaders
1	Baltimore Ravens	North	13	4	0	.765	3–3	8–4	.543	.529	L1
2 (Note: Buffalo claimed the No. 2 seed over Kansas City based on head-to-head victory.) (Note: Buffalo finished ahead of Miami in the AFC East based on head-to-head sweep.)	Buffalo Bills	East	11	6	0	.647	4–2	7–5	.471	.471	W5
3	Kansas City Chiefs	West	11	6	0	.647	4–2	9–3	.481	.428	W2
4	Houston Texans	South	10	7	0	.588	4–2	7–5	.474	.465	W2
Wild cards
5 (Note: Cleveland claimed the No. 5 seed over Miami based on conference record.)	Cleveland Browns	North	11	6	0	.647	3–3	8–4	.536	.513	L1
6	Miami Dolphins	East	11	6	0	.647	4–2	7–5	.450	.358	L2
7	Pittsburgh Steelers	North	10	7	0	.588	5–1	7–5	.540	.571	W3
Did not qualify for the postseason
8 (Note: Cincinnati finished ahead of Jacksonville based on head-to-head victory. Division tie break was initially used to eliminate Indianapolis (see below).)	Cincinnati Bengals	North	9	8	0	.529	1–5	4–8	.574	.536	W1
9 (Note: Jacksonville finished ahead of Indianapolis based on head-to-head sweep.)	Jacksonville Jaguars	South	9	8	0	.529	4–2	6–6	.533	.477	L1
10	Indianapolis Colts	South	9	8	0	.529	3–3	7–5	.491	.444	L1
11 (Note: Las Vegas finished ahead of Denver based on head-to-head sweep.)	Las Vegas Raiders	West	8	9	0	.471	4–2	6–6	.488	.426	W1
12	Denver Broncos	West	8	9	0	.471	3–3	5–7	.488	.485	L1
13	New York Jets	East	7	10	0	.412	2–4	4–8	.502	.454	W1
14	Tennessee Titans	South	6	11	0	.353	1–5	4–8	.522	.422	W1
15	Los Angeles Chargers	West	5	12	0	.294	1–5	3–9	.529	.388	L5
16	New England Patriots	East	4	13	0	.235	2–4	4–8	.522	.529	L2
Tiebreakers (Note: When breaking ties for three or more teams under the NFL's rules, they are first broken within divisions, then comparing only the highest ranked remaining team from each division.)

NFC
#	Team	Division	W	L	T	PCT	DIV	CONF	SOS	SOV	STK
Division leaders
1 (Note: San Francisco finished ahead of Dallas and Detroit based on conference record, claiming the No. 1 seed.)	San Francisco 49ers	West	12	5	0	.706	5–1	10–2	.509	.475	L1
2 (Note: Dallas claimed the No. 2 seed over Detroit based on head-to-head victory.)	Dallas Cowboys	East	12	5	0	.706	5–1	9–3	.446	.392	W2
3	Detroit Lions	North	12	5	0	.706	4–2	8–4	.481	.436	W1
4 (Note: Tampa Bay finished ahead of New Orleans in the NFC South based on common record. (Tampa Bay is 8–4 against Minnesota, Chicago, Detroit, Green Bay, Atlanta, Carolina, Houston, Tennessee, Jacksonville, and Indianapolis, while New Orleans is 6–6 against the same teams.))	Tampa Bay Buccaneers	South	9	8	0	.529	4–2	7–5	.481	.379	W1
Wild cards
5	Philadelphia Eagles	East	11	6	0	.647	4–2	7–5	.481	.476	L2
6	Los Angeles Rams	West	10	7	0	.588	5–1	8–4	.529	.453	W4
7 (Note: Green Bay and Seattle finished ahead of New Orleans based on conference record.) (Note: Green Bay finished ahead of Seattle based on strength of victory, claiming the 7th and final playoff spot.)	Green Bay Packers	North	9	8	0	.529	4–2	7–5	.474	.458	W3
Did not qualify for the postseason
8	Seattle Seahawks	West	9	8	0	.529	2–4	7–5	.512	.392	W1
9	New Orleans Saints	South	9	8	0	.529	4–2	6–6	.433	.340	W2
10 (Note: Minnesota finished ahead of Atlanta based on head-to-head victory. Division tie break was initially used to eliminate Chicago (see below).) (Note: Minnesota finished ahead of Chicago based on common record. (Minnesota is 5–7 against Tampa Bay, Los Angeles Chargers, Carolina, Kansas City, Green Bay, Atlanta, New Orleans, Denver, Las Vegas, and Detroit, while Chicago is 4–8 against the same teams.))	Minnesota Vikings	North	7	10	0	.412	2–4	6–6	.509	.454	L4
11 (Note: Chicago finished ahead of Atlanta based on head-to-head victory.)	Chicago Bears	North	7	10	0	.412	2–4	6–6	.464	.370	L1
12	Atlanta Falcons	South	7	10	0	.412	3–3	4–8	.429	.462	L2
13	New York Giants	East	6	11	0	.353	3–3	5–7	.512	.353	W1
14 (Note: Washington finished ahead of Arizona based on head-to-head victory.)	Washington Commanders	East	4	13	0	.235	0–6	2–10	.512	.338	L8
15	Arizona Cardinals	West	4	13	0	.235	0–6	3–9	.561	.588	L1
16	Carolina Panthers	South	2	15	0	.118	1–5	1–11	.522	.500	L3
Tiebreakers (Note: When breaking ties for three or more teams under the NFL's rules, they are first broken within divisions, then comparing only the highest-ranked remaining team from each division.)

== Postseason ==
The 2023 playoffs began with the wild-card round, with three wild-card games played in each conference. Wild Card Weekend was played on January 13–15, 2024. In the Divisional round on January 20–21, the top seed in the conference played the lowest remaining seed and the other two remaining teams played each other. The winners of those games advanced to the Conference Championship games played on January 28. Super Bowl LVIII was played on February 11 at Allegiant Stadium in Paradise, Nevada.

=== Bracket ===
Jan 15 – Raymond James Stadium	Jan 21 – Ford Field
5	Philadelphia	9
4	Tampa Bay	32
4	Tampa Bay	23
Jan 28 – Levi's Stadium
Jan 14 – Ford Field	3	Detroit	31
NFC
6	LA Rams	23	3	Detroit	31
Jan 20 – Levi's Stadium
3	Detroit	24	1	San Francisco	34
NFC Championship
Jan 14 – AT&T Stadium	7	Green Bay	21
1	San Francisco	24
7	Green Bay	48
Divisional round	Feb 11 – Allegiant Stadium
2	Dallas	32
Wild-card round
N1	San Francisco	22
Jan 13 – Arrowhead Stadium	Jan 21 – Highmark Stadium	A3	Kansas City	25*
Super Bowl LVIII
6	Miami	7
3	Kansas City	26
3	Kansas City	27
Jan 28 – M&T Bank Stadium
Jan 15 – Highmark Stadium	2	Buffalo	24
AFC
7	Pittsburgh	17	3	Kansas City	17
Jan 20 – M&T Bank Stadium
2	Buffalo	31	1	Baltimore	10
AFC Championship
Jan 13 – NRG Stadium	4	Houston	10
1	Baltimore	34
5	Cleveland	14
4	Houston	45

* Indicates overtime victory

== Records, milestones, and notable statistics ==
Week 1

- Tyreek Hill set the record for most games with at least 200 receiving yards and two receiving touchdowns, with three. He shared the previous record of two with nine other players.

Week 2

- Puka Nacua set the record for most receptions in a game by a rookie, with 15. The previous record of 14 was shared by four players.
- Nacua also became the first rookie to record at least ten catches and 100 receiving yards in each of his team's first two games of the season.
- Nacua also set the record for most receptions in a player's first two games of his career, with 25. The previous record of 19 was held by Earl Cooper.
- Travis Kelce passed Shannon Sharpe for fourth place in most receptions made by a tight end.
- C. J. Stroud set the Super Bowl Era record for most yards thrown by a rookie without an interception in his first two starts, with 626.
- Russell Wilson became the first player to reach 40,000 passing yards and 5,000 rushing yards.
- Wilson also became the third quarterback to reach 5,000 rushing yards, joining Michael Vick and Cam Newton.

Week 3

- Matt Gay became the first player to kick four field goals of at least 50 yards in a game.
- Keenan Allen set the record for most receptions in a game by a player who also had a passing touchdown, with 18. The previous record of 12 was shared by Tarik Cohen and Jerry Rice.
- Patrick Mahomes became the fastest player to reach 25,000 passing yards, doing so in 83 games. The previous record of 90 games was held by Matthew Stafford.
- Jalen Hurts set the record for most rushing touchdowns by a quarterback in his first 50 games, with 29. The previous record of 28 was held by Cam Newton.
- Sam LaPorta set the record for most receptions by a tight end in the first three games of his career, with 18. The previous record of 17 was held by Keith Jackson.
- LaPorta also became the first tight end to record at least five receptions in each of his first three career games.
- The Miami Dolphins became the third team to score 70 points in a game, joining the 1950 Los Angeles Rams and the 1966 Washington Redskins.
- Miami became the second team to record 700 yards of offense in a game, joining the 1951 Los Angeles Rams.
- Miami became the first team to record five rushing touchdowns and five passing touchdowns in the same game.

Week 4

- C. J. Stroud became the first player to have at least 1,200 passing yards and no interceptions in the first four games of his career.
- Khalil Mack tied the record for most career games with at least five sacks, with two. He shares the record with Derrick Thomas.
- Puka Nacua set the record for most receptions in a player's first four games of his career, with 39. The previous record of 30 was held by Anquan Boldin.
- Nacua also set the record for most receiving yards in a player's first four games of his career, with 501.
- Nacua also became the second player with at least 100 receiving yards in three of his first four career games, joining Harlon Hill.
- Andy Reid became the fourth head coach to win 250 games, joining Tom Landry, Bill Belichick, George Halas and Don Shula.

Week 5

- C. J. Stroud set the record for most pass attempts without an interception to start his career, ultimately with 191. The previous record of 176 was held by Dak Prescott.
- Patrick Mahomes became the tenth quarterback to defeat all 31 NFL teams excluding the team for which he plays. He also became the youngest to accomplish that feat at age 28 years, 21 days. The previous record of 30 years, 86 days was held by Tom Brady.
- The Miami Dolphins set the record for most total yards in the first five games of the season, with 2,568. The previous record of 2,527 was held by the 2000 St. Louis Rams.

Week 7

- Dustin Hopkins became the first player to make a field goal of at least 50 yards in five consecutive games.
- Patrick Mahomes became the fastest player to record ten games with at least 400 passing yards, doing so in 87 games. The previous record of 90 games was held by Dan Marino.
- Travis Kelce became the first tight end to record five games with at least ten receptions and 150 receiving yards.
- Myles Garrett set the record for most sacks recorded before a player's 28th birthday, with 82. The previous record of 80 was held by Reggie White.
- Puka Nacua set the record for most receptions by a player in the first seven games of his career, with 58. The previous record of 49 was held by Saquon Barkley.
- Bill Belichick became the third head coach to win 300 career games, joining Don Shula and George Halas.

Week 8

- Austin Ekeler became the seventh player to have 30 rushing touchdowns and 30 receiving touchdowns in career.
- DeAndre Hopkins tied the record for catching the first career touchdown pass thrown by the most different passers, with four. He shares the record with Joey Galloway and Marvin Harrison.
- Will Levis tied the record for most touchdown passes thrown in player's first NFL game, with four. He shares the record with Marcus Mariota and Fran Tarkenton.
- Tyreek Hill set the Super Bowl era record for most receiving yards through the first eight games of a season, with 1,014. The previous record of 978 yards was held by Torry Holt.

Week 9

- C. J. Stroud set the record for most passing yards in a game by a rookie, with 470. The previous record of 453 was held by Marc Bulger.
- Stroud also tied the record for most passing touchdowns in a game by a rookie, with five. He shares the record with five other players.
- Stroud also became the first rookie to have at least 400 passing yards, four passing touchdowns, and no interceptions in a game.
- A. J. Cole III set the record for gross punt average in a game, with 63.6 yards. The previous record of 63.0 yards was held by Andy Lee.
- Taysom Hill became the first player in the Super Bowl era to have at least ten touchdowns passing, rushing, and receiving in his career.
- Joshua Dobbs became the first player to have three touchdowns in back-to-back weeks while playing for different teams.
- Brandon Aubrey set the record for most consecutive field goals made without a miss to start his career, ultimately with 35. The previous record of 18 was held by Travis Coons.
- All four teams in the AFC North had a record of at least two games above .500 after this week concluded, marking the first time all four teams in one division were two games or more above .500 after Week 9 since the 2002 divisional realignment.

Week 10

- C. J. Stroud became the second rookie to pass for 800 yards in a two-game span, joining Cam Newton.
- Stroud also tied the record for most games with at least 350 passing yards by a rookie, with three. He shares the record with Newton and Andrew Luck.
- Justin Herbert set the record for most passing yards in a player's first four seasons, currently with 16,438. The previous record of 16,418 was held by Dan Marino.
- CeeDee Lamb became the first wide receiver since at least 1950 to have at least ten receptions, 150 receiving yards, a receiving touchdown, and a rushing touchdown in the same game.
- Six games ended with game-winning field goals as time expired, setting a record for one week.

Week 11

- Josh Allen set the record for most total touchdowns in a player's first six seasons, currently with 205. The previous record of 204 was held by Patrick Mahomes.
- Tyreek Hill became the first player in the Super Bowl era to have at least 1,200 receiving yards in his team's first ten games of a season.
- Jalen Hurts set the record for most rushing touchdowns by a quarterback in his first four seasons, currently with 35. The previous record of 33 was held by Cam Newton.

Week 12

- DaRon Bland set the record for most interception return touchdowns in a season, with five. The previous record of four was shared by Eric Allen, Ken Houston, and Jim Kearney.
- Jalen Hurts became the first quarterback to have at least 10 rushing touchdowns in three consecutive seasons.
- Hurts also set the record for most games with at least two rushing touchdowns by a quarterback, with 11. The previous record of 10 was held by Cam Newton.
- C. J. Stroud became the first rookie to have at least 300 passing yards in four consecutive games.
- Lamar Jackson became the fourth quarterback to have 5,000 career rushing yards, joining Newton, Michael Vick, and Russell Wilson. Jackson also became the fastest to reach this mark, doing so in 82 games. The previous record of 104 games was held by Vick.
- Patrick Mahomes set the record for most games with at least two passing touchdowns in a player's first seven seasons, currently with 66. The previous record of 65 was held by Dan Marino.
- Travis Kelce became the fourth tight end to reach 11,000 career receiving yards, joining Antonio Gates, Tony Gonzalez, and Jason Witten. Kelce became the fastest to reach this mark, doing so in 154 games. The previous record of 191 games was held by Gonzalez.

Week 13

- C. J. Stroud set the record for the most passing yards by a rookie in a five-game span, with 1,740. The previous record of 1,625 yards was held by Andrew Luck.
- Tyreek Hill set the record for the most games in a season with at least 150 receiving yards and a touchdown, with five. The previous record of four was shared by five players.
- Christian McCaffrey became the third player to have at least 50 rushing touchdowns and 25 receiving touchdowns, joining Marshall Faulk and Lenny Moore.
- Mike Evans improved his own record for the most seasons with at least 1,000 receiving yards to start a player's career, with 10.
- Evans also became the third player to have at least 10 seasons with at least 1,000 receiving yards at any point in his career, joining Randy Moss and Jerry Rice.
- The New England Patriots became the first team in the Super Bowl era to lose three straight games despite allowing 10 or fewer points in each game.

Week 14

- Deebo Samuel became the second player to have 100 receiving yards, a receiving touchdown, and a rushing touchdown in consecutive games, joining Timmy Brown.
- Joe Flacco became the 19th quarterback to win 100 career starts.
- Jake Browning set the record for highest completion percentage in his first three starts, completing 79.3% of his pass attempts. The previous record of 77.4% was held by Chad Pennington.
- Keenan Allen became the fastest player to have 900 receptions, doing so in 139 games. The previous record of 143 games was held by Antonio Brown.
- The Dallas Cowboys became the first team to score at least 30 points in each of its first seven home games of a season.

Week 15

- Josh Allen set the record for most games in a season with both a passing touchdown and a rushing touchdown, with ten. The previous record of nine was held by Kyler Murray.
- The Las Vegas Raiders set the record for most points scored in the first half of a game after being shutout the previous game, with 42. The previous record of 34 was held by the 1927 Frankford Yellow Jackets.

Week 16

- Josh Allen became the second quarterback to have 50 rushing touchdowns in his career, joining Cam Newton.
- Amari Cooper became the second player to have 200 receiving yards in a game for three different teams, joining Terrell Owens.
- Justin Jefferson set the record for most receiving yards in a player's first four seasons, currently with 5,648. The previous record of 5,512 was held by Michael Thomas.
- Jalen Hurts set the record for most rushing touchdowns by a quarterback in a season, with 15. The previous record of 14 was held by Newton.

Week 17

- Lamar Jackson became the fifth player to have at least three games with a perfect passer rating (minimum 10 attempts).
- Patrick Mahomes became the second player to have 4,000 passing yards in at least six of his first seven seasons, joining Peyton Manning.
- The Cleveland Browns became the first team to qualify for the postseason while having four quarterbacks make multiple starts.
- Josh Allen tied Jalen Hurts' record for most rushing touchdowns by a quarterback in a season with 15.
- The Pittsburgh Steelers became the second team to have 20 consecutive seasons with a winning percentage of .500 or better, joining the 1965–85 Dallas Cowboys.

Week 18

- Puka Nacua set the record for the most receiving yards by a rookie in a season, with 1,486. The previous record of 1,463 yards was held by Bill Groman.
- Nacua also set the record for the most receptions by a rookie in a season, with 105. The previous record of 104 receptions was held by Jaylen Waddle.
- Montez Sweat became the first player to lead two teams in sacks during the same season since sacks became an official statistic in 1982.
- Sam LaPorta set the record for most receptions in a season by a rookie tight end, with 82. The previous record of 81 was held by Keith Jackson.
- LaPorta also became the third rookie tight end with at least 10 receiving touchdowns, joining Mike Ditka and Rob Gronkowski.
- LaPorta and Jahmyr Gibbs became the first pair of rookie teammates to each score at least 10 touchdowns.
- C. J. Stroud became the fifth player to have at least 4,000 passing yards in his rookie season.
- Evan Engram became the eighth tight end in NFL history to record over 100 receptions in a season in the Super Bowl era.
- Bill Belichick tied the record for most losses by a head coach, with 165. He shares the record with Jeff Fisher and Dan Reeves.
- The AFC North became the first division since the 1935 Western Division to have all its teams finish with a winning record.

Wild-card round

- C. J. Stroud tied the record for most touchdown passes in a playoff game by a rookie, with three. He shares the record with Sammy Baugh, Dak Prescott, and Brock Purdy.
- Stroud also became the youngest starting quarterback to win a playoff game at age 22 years, 102 days. The previous record of 22 years, 192 days was held by Michael Vick.
- The Green Bay Packers tied the record for most postseason wins by a franchise, with 37. They share the record with the New England Patriots.
- Green Bay also became the first 7-seed to win a playoff game.

Divisional round

- Patrick Mahomes and Travis Kelce set the record for most postseason touchdown passes by a passer-receiver duo, with 16. The previous record of 15 was held by Tom Brady and Rob Gronkowski.

Conference championships

- Travis Kelce set the record for most career receptions in the postseason, currently with 156. The previous record of 151 was held by Jerry Rice.
- Kelce also tied the record for most career postseason games with at least 100 receiving yards, with eight. He shares the record with Rice.

Super Bowl LVIII

- Jake Moody set the record for the longest field goal in a Super Bowl, with a 55-yard kick. Later in the game, Harrison Butker broke Moody's record with a 57-yard field goal. The previous record of 54 yards was held by Steve Christie.
- Butker set the record for most career field goals made in the Super Bowl, with nine. The previous record of eight was shared by Adam Vinatieri and Stephen Gostkowski.
- Moody became the first player to convert two field goals of at least 50 yards in the same Super Bowl.
- Patrick Mahomes set the record for most career rushing yards in the Super Bowl by a quarterback, with 172. The previous record of 105 was held by Joe Montana.
- Jauan Jennings became the second player to have a passing and receiving touchdown in the same Super Bowl, joining Nick Foles.
- The game set the record for the longest Super Bowl in terms of game time, at 74 minutes, 57 seconds. The previous record of 63 minutes, 58 seconds was set in Super Bowl LI. This game also joined Super Bowl LI to become the second Super Bowl to go into overtime.

== Regular-season statistical leaders ==
Individual
Scoring leader	Brandon Aubrey	Dallas	157
Most field goals made	Brandon Aubrey	Dallas	36
Touchdowns	Raheem Mostert	Miami	21
Touchdowns	Christian McCaffrey	San Francisco	21
Touchdowns	Christian McCaffrey	San Francisco	21
Rushing yards	Christian McCaffrey	San Francisco	1459
Passing yards	Tua Tagovailoa	Miami	4624
Passing touchdowns	Dak Prescott	Dallas	36
Interceptions thrown	Sam Howell	Washington	21
Passer rating	Brock Purdy	San Francisco	113.0
Pass receptions	CeeDee Lamb	Dallas	135
Pass receiving yards	Tyreek Hill	Miami	1799
Combined tackles	Bobby Wagner	Seattle	183
Interceptions	DaRon Bland	Dallas	9
Punting	Thomas Morstead	New York Jets	4831; avg 48.8
Sacks	T. J. Watt	Pittsburgh	19.0

== Awards ==
=== Individual season awards ===
The 13th NFL Honors, saluting the best players and plays from the 2023 season, was held on February 8, 2024, at Resorts World Theatre, Las Vegas, Nevada.

Award	Winner	Position	Team
Most Valuable Player	Lamar Jackson	QB	Baltimore Ravens
Offensive Player of the Year	Christian McCaffrey	RB	San Francisco 49ers
Defensive Player of the Year	Myles Garrett	DE	Cleveland Browns
Offensive Rookie of the Year	C. J. Stroud	QB	Houston Texans
Defensive Rookie of the Year	Will Anderson Jr.	DE	Houston Texans
Comeback Player of the Year	Joe Flacco	QB	Cleveland Browns
Coach of the Year	Kevin Stefanski	HC	Cleveland Browns
Assistant Coach of the Year	Jim Schwartz	DC	Cleveland Browns
Pepsi Rookie of the Year	C. J. Stroud	QB	Houston Texans
Walter Payton NFL Man of the Year	Cameron Heyward	DT	Pittsburgh Steelers
PFWA NFL Executive of the Year	Brad Holmes	GM	Detroit Lions
Super Bowl Most Valuable Player	Patrick Mahomes	QB	Kansas City Chiefs

=== All-Pro team ===
The following players were named first-team All-Pro by the Associated Press:

Offense
QB	Lamar Jackson (BAL)
RB	Christian McCaffrey (SF)
WR	Tyreek Hill (MIA); CeeDee Lamb (DAL); Amon-Ra St. Brown (DET)
TE	George Kittle (SF)
LT	Trent Williams (SF)
LG	Joe Thuney (KC)
C	Jason Kelce (PHI)
RG	Zack Martin (DAL)
RT	Penei Sewell (DET)

Defense
DE	Myles Garrett (CLE); T. J. Watt (PIT)
DT	Aaron Donald (LAR); Chris Jones (KC)
LB	Fred Warner (SF); Roquan Smith (BAL); Quincy Williams (NYJ)
CB	DaRon Bland (DAL); Sauce Gardner (NYJ); Trent McDuffie (KC)
S	Kyle Hamilton (BAL); Antoine Winfield Jr. (TB)

Special teams
K	Brandon Aubrey (DAL)
P	A. J. Cole III (LV)
KR	Keisean Nixon (GB)
PR	Rashid Shaheed (NO)
ST	Miles Killebrew (PIT)
LS	Ross Matiscik (JAX)

=== Players of the Week/Month ===
The following were named the top performers during the 2023 season:

Week/ Month	Offensive Player of the Week/Month		Defensive Player of the Week/Month		Special Teams Player of the Week/Month	
Week/ Month	AFC	NFC	AFC	NFC	AFC	NFC
1	Tua Tagovailoa QB (Miami)	Brandon Aiyuk WR (San Francisco)	Jordan Whitehead S (New York Jets)	Jessie Bates S (Atlanta)	Xavier Gipson WR (New York Jets)	Jake Elliott K (Philadelphia)
2	Josh Allen QB (Buffalo)	D'Andre Swift RB (Philadelphia)	Alex Highsmith LB (Pittsburgh)	Micah Parsons LB (Dallas)	Nick Folk K (Tennessee)	Jake Camarda P (Tampa Bay)
3	De'Von Achane RB (Miami)	Kenneth Walker III RB (Seattle)	Terrel Bernard LB (Buffalo)	Aidan Hutchinson DE (Detroit)	Matt Gay K (Indianapolis)	Matt Prater K (Arizona)
Sept.	Tua Tagovailoa QB (Miami)	Christian McCaffrey RB (San Francisco)	T. J. Watt LB (Pittsburgh)	Micah Parsons LB (Dallas)	Tyler Bass K (Buffalo)	Jake Camarda P (Tampa Bay)
4	Josh Allen QB (Buffalo)	Christian McCaffrey RB (San Francisco)	Khalil Mack OLB (Los Angeles Chargers)	Devon Witherspoon CB (Seattle)	Brandon McManus K (Jacksonville)	Jake Elliott K (Philadelphia)
5	Ja'Marr Chase WR (Cincinnati)	D. J. Moore WR (Chicago)	Maxx Crosby DE (Las Vegas)	Fred Warner MLB (San Francisco)	Greg Zuerlein K (New York Jets)	Blake Grupe K (New Orleans)
6	Raheem Mostert RB (Miami)	Jared Goff QB (Detroit)	Blake Cashman LB (Houston)	Jordan Hicks LB (Minnesota)	Dustin Hopkins K (Cleveland)	Jamison Crowder WR (Washington)
7	Lamar Jackson QB (Baltimore)	A. J. Brown WR (Philadelphia)	Myles Garrett DE (Cleveland)	Camryn Bynum S (Minnesota)	Dustin Hopkins K (Cleveland)	Younghoe Koo K (Atlanta)
8	Joe Burrow QB (Cincinnati)	Jalen Hurts QB (Philadelphia)	Justin Simmons S (Denver)	Frankie Luvu LB (Carolina)	Thomas Morstead P (New York Jets)	Brandon Aubrey K (Dallas)
Oct.	Tyreek Hill WR (Miami)	A. J. Brown WR (Philadelphia)	Quincy Williams LB (New York Jets)	Danielle Hunter LB (Minnesota)	Brandon McManus K (Jacksonville)	Brandon Aubrey K (Dallas)
9	C. J. Stroud QB (Houston)	Joshua Dobbs QB (Minnesota)	Kenny Moore II CB (Indianapolis)	Paulson Adebo CB (New Orleans)	Derius Davis WR (Los Angeles Chargers)	Tress Way P (Washington)
10	Devin Singletary RB (Houston)	CeeDee Lamb WR (Dallas)	Robert Spillane LB (Las Vegas)	Nick Bosa DL (San Francisco)	Marvin Mims WR (Denver)	Jason Myers K (Seattle)
11	Trevor Lawrence QB (Jacksonville)	Brock Purdy QB (San Francisco)	Jalen Ramsey CB (Miami)	DaRon Bland CB (Dallas)	Reggie Gilliam FB (Buffalo)	Ethan Evans P (Los Angeles Rams)
12	Patrick Mahomes QB (Kansas City)	Kyren Williams RB (Los Angeles Rams)	Josh Allen DE (Jacksonville)	Jessie Bates S (Atlanta)	Brandon McManus K (Jacksonville)	Jake Elliott K (Philadelphia)
Nov.	C. J. Stroud QB (Houston)	Dak Prescott QB (Dallas)	Khalil Mack LB (Los Angeles Chargers)	DaRon Bland CB (Dallas)	Wil Lutz K (Denver)	Cairo Santos K (Chicago)
13	Jake Browning QB (Cincinnati)	Deebo Samuel WR (San Francisco)	Derek Stingley Jr. CB (Houston)	Antoine Winfield Jr. S (Tampa Bay)	J. K. Scott P (Los Angeles Chargers)	Jalen Reeves-Maybin LB (Detroit)
14	Zach Wilson QB (New York Jets)	Tommy DeVito QB (New York Giants)	Harold Landry LB (Tennessee)	Ivan Pace Jr. LB (Minnesota)	Tylan Wallace WR (Baltimore)	Brandon Aubrey K (Dallas)
15	James Cook RB (Buffalo)	Baker Mayfield QB (Tampa Bay)	Bradley Chubb LB (Miami)	Julian Love S (Seattle)	Kaʻimi Fairbairn K (Houston)	Eddy Piñeiro K (Carolina)
16	Amari Cooper WR (Cleveland)	Puka Nacua WR (Los Angeles Rams)	Kyle Hamilton S (Baltimore)	Ifeatu Melifonwu S (Detroit)	Jason Sanders K (Miami)	Younghoe Koo K (Atlanta)
17	Lamar Jackson QB (Baltimore)	Jordan Love QB (Green Bay)	Rasul Douglas CB (Buffalo)	Tyrique Stevenson CB (Chicago)	Harrison Butker K (Kansas City)	Gunner Olszewski WR (New York Giants)
18	C. J. Stroud QB (Houston)	Jordan Love QB (Green Bay)	T. J. Watt LB (Pittsburgh)	Antoine Winfield Jr. S (Tampa Bay)	Deonte Harty WR (Buffalo)	Jamie Gillan P (New York Giants)
Dec./Jan.	Lamar Jackson QB (Baltimore)	Christian McCaffrey RB (San Francisco)	Derek Stingley Jr. CB (Houston)	Antoine Winfield Jr. S (Tampa Bay)	Sam Martin P (Buffalo)	Brandon Aubrey K (Dallas)

Week	FedEx Air Player of the Week	FedEx Ground Player of the Week	Pepsi Zero Sugar Rookie of the Week
1	Tua Tagovailoa (Miami)	Christian McCaffrey (San Francisco)	Xavier Gipson WR (New York Jets)
2	Geno Smith (Seattle)	Christian McCaffrey (San Francisco)	Puka Nacua WR (Los Angeles Rams)
3	Tua Tagovailoa (Miami)	De'Von Achane (Miami)	De'Von Achane RB (Miami)
4	Josh Allen (Buffalo)	Christian McCaffrey (San Francisco)	Puka Nacua WR (Los Angeles Rams)
5	Joe Burrow (Cincinnati)	Breece Hall (New York Jets)	De'Von Achane RB (Miami)
6	Jared Goff (Detroit)	Raheem Mostert (Miami)	Byron Young LB (Los Angeles Rams)
7	Patrick Mahomes (Kansas City)	D'Onta Foreman (Chicago)	Puka Nacua WR (Los Angeles Rams)
8	Jalen Hurts (Philadelphia)	Gus Edwards (Baltimore)	Will Levis QB (Tennessee)
9	C. J. Stroud (Houston)	Keaton Mitchell (Baltimore)	C. J. Stroud QB (Houston)
10	Dak Prescott (Dallas)	Devin Singletary (Houston)	C. J. Stroud QB (Houston)
11	Brock Purdy (San Francisco)	Jaylen Warren (Pittsburgh)	Tommy DeVito QB (New York Giants)
12	Dak Prescott (Dallas)	Christian McCaffrey (San Francisco)	Jalin Hyatt WR (New York Giants)
13	Brock Purdy (San Francisco)	James Conner (Arizona)	Sam LaPorta TE (Detroit)
14	Brock Purdy (San Francisco)	Christian McCaffrey (San Francisco)	Tommy DeVito QB (New York Giants)
15	Baker Mayfield (Tampa Bay)	James Cook (Buffalo)	Sam LaPorta TE (Detroit)
16	Joe Flacco (Cleveland)	Khalil Herbert (Chicago)	Puka Nacua WR (Los Angeles Rams)
17	Lamar Jackson (Baltimore)	Najee Harris (Pittsburgh)	Zay Flowers WR (Baltimore)
18	Jordan Love (Green Bay)	Derrick Henry (Tennessee)	C. J. Stroud QB (Houston)

Month	Rookie of the Month	
Month	Offensive	Defensive
Sept.	C. J. Stroud QB (Houston)	Christian Gonzalez CB (New England)
Oct.	Jordan Addison WR (Minnesota)	Devon Witherspoon CB (Seattle)
Nov.	C. J. Stroud QB (Houston)	Calijah Kancey DT (Tampa Bay)
Dec./Jan.	Puka Nacua WR (Los Angeles Rams)	Kobie Turner DT (Los Angeles Rams)

== Notable events ==
=== Sale of the Washington Commanders ===
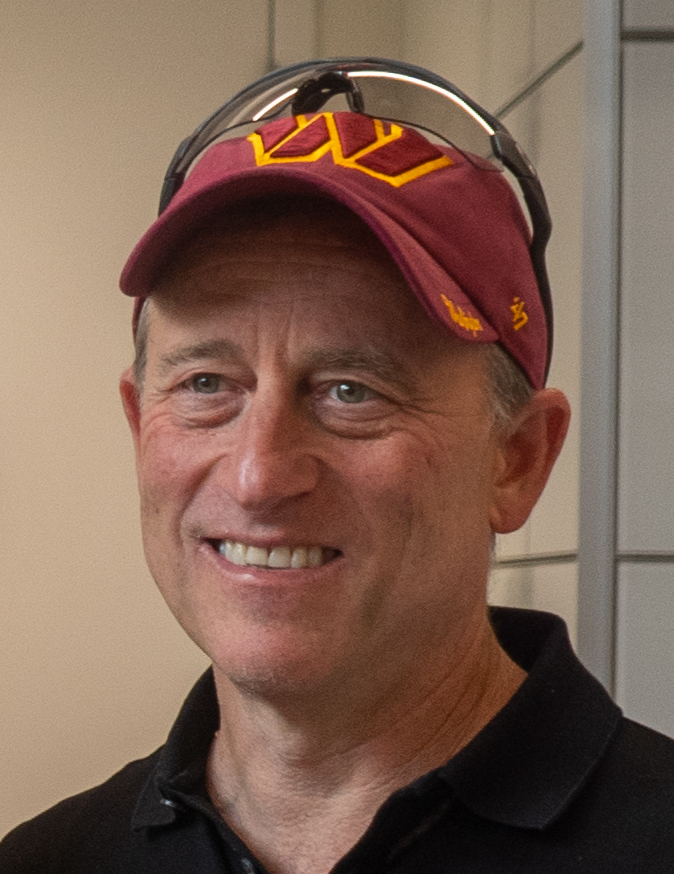
Josh Harris led a group that bought the Washington Commanders from Daniel Snyder for $6.05 billion.

After mounting pressure from other league owners to sell the franchise, Daniel Snyder hired BofA Securities in November 2022 to explore possible transactions. He reached an agreement in May 2023 to sell the Commanders to a group headed by Josh Harris, owner of the NBA's Philadelphia 76ers and the NHL's New Jersey Devils, for $6.05 billion. The group has 20 limited partners worth a combined $100 billion, including Mitchell Rales and Magic Johnson. The sale was the highest price ever paid for a sports team and was unanimously approved by the NFL on July 20, 2023.

=== Gambling suspensions ===
On April 21, the NFL suspended three players indefinitely (Detroit wide receiver Quintez Cephus and safety C. J. Moore, and Washington defensive end Shaka Toney), and two players for six games (Detroit wide receivers Jameson Williams and Stanley Berryhill) for violations of the league's gambling policy. Detroit later released Cephus and Moore.

On June 29, the NFL suspended three additional players indefinitely (Indianapolis cornerback Isaiah Rodgers and linebacker Rashod Berry, and free agent defensive lineman Demetrius Taylor) for betting on league games in 2022. The league also suspended Tennessee offensive lineman Nicholas Petit-Frere for six games for violating the league's gambling policy by betting on non-NFL sports while at team facilities. On July 24, Denver defensive lineman Eyioma Uwazurike was suspended indefinitely for violating the policy.

On September 29, the NFL revised the gambling policy. Betting on NFL games will incur a minimum ban of one year, providing inside information will incur an indefinite ban with a one-year minimum, and match fixing or attempted match fixing will result in a lifetime ban. The penalties for betting on other sports at NFL facilities were reduced to a two-game ban for first-time offenders, a six-game ban for second-time offenders, and a minimum one-year ban for further infractions. This resulted in Williams and Petit-Frere being immediately reinstated.

All players suspended indefinitely were allowed to apply for reinstatement after the 2023 season.

== Head coaching and front office changes ==
=== Head coaches ===
==== Off-season ====
Team	Departing coach	Interim coach	Incoming coach	Reason for leaving	Notes
Arizona Cardinals	Kliff Kingsbury		Jonathan Gannon	Fired	Kingsbury was fired on January 9, after four seasons with the Cardinals. During his tenure, the team was 28–37–1 (.432), with one playoff appearance and no playoff wins. Gannon, who spent the previous two seasons as the Philadelphia Eagles defensive coordinator, was hired on February 14. This is his first head coaching position at any level.
Carolina Panthers	Matt Rhule	Steve Wilks	Frank Reich	Fired	After a 1–4 start, Rhule was fired on October 10, 2022, after more than two seasons with the team. During his tenure, the Panthers were 11–27 (.289) with no playoff appearances. Wilks, the team's defensive pass game coordinator and secondary coach, took over as interim coach. This is his second NFL head coaching position, having previously been the head coach of the Arizona Cardinals for one season. Reich was hired on January 26. As the head coach of the Indianapolis Colts from 2018 to 2022, he compiled a record of 40–33–1 (.547), with two playoff appearances and a 1–2 (.333) playoff record.
Denver Broncos	Nathaniel Hackett	Jerry Rosburg	Sean Payton	Fired	Hackett was fired on December 26, 2022, after a 4–11 (.267) tenure, missing the playoffs in his only partial season with the team. Rosburg, the team's senior assistant to the head coach, was named interim head coach. This is his first head coaching position; he previously served as the Baltimore Ravens special team coordinator for eleven seasons. Payton was hired on February 3. In fifteen seasons with the New Orleans Saints, he compiled an overall record of 152–89 (.631), with nine playoff appearances, seven NFC South division titles, and a Super Bowl championship. He was the AP NFL Coach of the Year in 2006.
Houston Texans	Lovie Smith		DeMeco Ryans	Fired	Smith was fired on January 8 after one season, compiling a record of 3–13–1 (.206) and missing the playoffs. Ryans was hired on January 31. A former Texans linebacker and defensive assistant coach for the San Francisco 49ers since 2017, this is his first NFL head coaching position.
Indianapolis Colts	Frank Reich	Jeff Saturday	Shane Steichen	Fired	Reich was fired on November 7, 2022, after starting the season 3–5–1 (.389). In 5+ seasons with the Colts, Reich was 40–33–1 (.547), with 2 playoff appearances and a playoff record of 1–2 (.333). Saturday, a 6-time Pro Bowler who played thirteen seasons as a center in the NFL (twelve of them for the Colts), and consultant for the team, was named interim head coach. His only previous coaching experience at any level was for Hebron Christian Academy in Dacula, Georgia. Steichen, who spent the previous two seasons as the Philadelphia Eagles offensive coordinator, was hired on February 14. This is his first head coaching position at any level.

==== In-season ====
Team	Departing coach	Reason for leaving	Interim replacement	Notes
Las Vegas Raiders	Josh McDaniels	Fired	Antonio Pierce	After a 3–5 (.375) start, McDaniels was fired on October 31 after one and a half seasons with the team. During his tenure, the Raiders were 9–16 (.360) with no playoff appearances. Pierce, the team's linebackers coach, was promoted to interim head coach. This is his first head coaching position.
Carolina Panthers	Frank Reich	Fired	Chris Tabor	On November 27, Reich was fired after 1–10 (.091) start in his first year as Panthers' head coach. Tabor, the team's special teams coordinator, was elevated as interim head coach. This is his first experience as head coach.
Los Angeles Chargers	Brandon Staley	Fired	Giff Smith	After a 5–9 (.357) start, Staley was fired on December 15 after almost three seasons with the team. During his tenure, the Chargers were 24–24 (.500) with one playoff appearance and a playoff record of 0–1 (.000). Smith, the team's outside linebackers coach, was elevated as interim head coach. This is his first head coaching position.

=== Front office personnel ===
==== Off-season ====
Team	Position	Departing office holder	Reason for leaving	Interim replacement	Incoming office holder	Notes
Arizona Cardinals	General manager	Steve Keim	Resigned	—N/a	Monti Ossenfort	Keim stepped down on January 9 for health-related reasons. He had served as the Cardinals' GM for 10 seasons. Ossenfort was hired on January 16. He was previously the Tennessee Titans' director of player personnel from 2020 to 2022.
Chicago Bears	President	Ted Phillips	Retired	—N/a	Kevin Warren	Phillips retired after the 2022 season, after 24 seasons as the Bears' president. Warren was hired on January 12. He was previously the Big Ten Commissioner from 2020 to 2023.
Tennessee Titans	General manager	Jon Robinson	Fired	Ryan Cowden	Ran Carthon	Robinson was fired on December 6, 2022, after more than six seasons as the Titans' GM, despite a relatively successful tenure with the Titans, including two AFC South titles, four playoff appearances, and an AFC Championship appearance in 2019. Cowden, the team's vice president of player personnel, served as interim GM for the rest of the season. Carthon was hired on January 18. He had been in management positions with several teams since 2008, after playing two seasons with the Indianapolis Colts from 2004 to 2006. His most recent position was as the San Francisco 49ers' director of pro/player personnel since 2017.

==== In-season ====
Team	Position	Departing office holder	Reason for leaving	Interim replacement	Notes
Las Vegas Raiders	General manager	Dave Ziegler	Fired	Champ Kelly	After a 3–5 start, Ziegler was fired on October 31 after one and a half seasons with the team. During his tenure, the Raiders were 9–16 (.360) with no playoff appearances. Kelly, the team's assistant general manager, would serve as interim GM for the rest of the season.
Los Angeles Chargers	General manager	Tom Telesco	Fired	JoJo Wooden	Telesco was fired on December 15 after ten seasons with the team. Wooden, the team's director of player personnel, would serve as interim GM for the rest of the season.

== Stadiums ==
- On April 13, Cleveland announced the team and FirstEnergy Corp agreed to end their stadium naming rights agreement following the company's involvement in the Ohio nuclear bribery scandal. FirstEnergy Stadium returned to its original name, Cleveland Browns Stadium, which was used from 1999 to 2012. The naming-rights agreement was set to expire in 2029.
- On June 23, Jacksonville announced that TIAA Bank Field, the team's home stadium, would be renamed EverBank Stadium prior to the start of the season following a rebrand of the bank.

== Uniforms ==
=== Uniform changes ===
Several NFL teams switched to using Nike's new Vapor F.U.S.E. uniform template after Seattle had a brief trial run during the 2020 season.

- Arizona introduced a new uniform design for 2023. The new designs feature simplified uniform striping. The previous color scheme was retained with silver added as an accent color. A large "Arizona" word mark was added above the numbers on the home uniform. The home uniform's numbers are accented with a silver outline and forgoes a sleeve pattern included on the alternate and away jerseys. The away uniform is white with red numbers that are outlined with black trim, and red and silver stripes along the pants and sleeves. The alternate uniform is black with red numbers outlined in silver. Arizona's primary helmet was modified to feature silver facemasks, silver reflective flakes on the shell, and a larger logo.
- Carolina adjusted the team's shade of blue. The team will retain its preexisting uniform design otherwise, with a modification to the jersey's shoulder stripes.
- Indianapolis implemented a new alternate uniform dubbed "Indiana Nights". The design features a heather fabric pattern displayed on blue jerseys and blue pants with white numbers outlined in black. A new black helmet accompanies the uniform.
- Minnesota introduced a new throwback uniform similar to the design worn during the 1960s and 1970s. The helmet is modified to include a gray facemask in place of the team's standard black facemask, and features an altered logo to more closely resemble the era's design. They were worn for two games.
- The New York Jets debuted a throwback uniform dubbed "Legacy White" inspired by a former design worn by the team from 1978 to 1989. The uniform was worn for two home games.
- Philadelphia reinstated its Kelly green throwback uniforms for the 2023 season. This iteration is modeled after the set worn from 1985 to 1995 and were worn for two games. The Eagles last featured Kelly green uniforms during the 2010 season.
- Seattle reintroduced its 1990s era uniforms as a part of the "NFL's classic uniform program" during the 2023 season. They were worn in both a home game and a road game. The throwback combination replaces Seattle's grey alternate due to NFL rules limiting teams to a maximum of four uniforms.
- Tampa Bay reinstated the orange throwback "creamsicle" uniforms worn from 1976 to 1996. The team intended to wear the design during the 2022 season but delayed its reintroduction until 2023, citing supply chain issues. The team wore this design for one game and for the first time since the 2012 season.
- Tennessee wore a Houston Oilers-era uniform based on their design from 1981 to 1998 for two home games. This design replaced Tennessee's light blue uniform as the team's alternate. The Titans last wore Oilers uniforms in 2009.

=== Alternate helmets ===
- Cleveland introduced a white helmet with an orange and brown center stripe. The helmet was worn with the team's 1946 throwback uniforms, which were previously introduced in 2021. It was worn for three games.
- Denver wore a white alternate helmet adorned with decals based on the team logo introduced in 1968. The helmet's decals and stripes are similar to the ones used with Denver's 2016 "Color Rush" combination. The helmet was paired with those uniforms and were worn for two games.
- Detroit introduced an alternate helmet. The helmet's shell is Honolulu blue and features decals based on the team logo used from 1961 to 1969. The helmet was paired with Detroit's all-grey alternate uniform and was worn for two games.
- Indianapolis revealed a new helmet worn with the aforementioned "Indiana Nights" alternate uniform. The helmet's shell is black and includes the team logo outlined in white.
- Philadelphia paired the throwback uniform listed above with the helmet of that era: a Kelly green shell with silver eagle wing decals outlined in white and a gray facemask. This replaced the black helmet used with the team's black alternate uniform the previous season.
- Seattle paired the throwback uniform listed above with the classic silver helmet featuring the original team logo.
- Tampa Bay paired the throwback uniform listed above with the classic white helmet featuring the franchise's original mascot, Bucco Bruce.
- Tennessee paired the throwback uniform listed above with the classic white helmet featuring the famed Houston Oilers oil derrick logo.

=== Patches ===
- Starting in Week 6, Chicago will feature a patch that commemorates Hall of Famer Dick Butkus, who died on October 5.
- Cleveland features a patch that commemorates Hall of Famer Jim Brown, who died on May 18.
- Detroit features a patch that commemorates their 90th season in the city.
- Indianapolis wore a patch that commemorates the team's 40th season in the city during their home opener.
- Kansas City wear a patch honoring team founder Lamar Hunt's late wife Norma Knobel Hunt who died on June 4. The patch displays her "NKH" initials and will be worn for the entirety of the season.
- Minnesota will accompany their throwback uniform with a patch honoring their late former head coach Bud Grant, who died earlier in the year. The patch features Grant's signature and will be worn for one game. The patch's design will be featured as a decal on the team's helmet throughout the rest of the season.
- Teams that played on Thanksgiving Day wore a commemorative patch honoring Hall of Famer John Madden.

== Media ==
=== National ===
==== New media contracts ====
This was the first season under 11-year U.S. media rights agreements with CBS, Fox, NBC, ESPN/ABC, and NFL Network renewing their existing regular season AFC, NFC, Sunday Night Football, Monday Night Football, and NFL Network Exclusive Game Series packages, respectively, through the 2033 season. The contracts keep CBS, NBC, and ESPN's digital rights to stream their respective live games on their respective paid over-the-top subscription streaming platforms, Paramount+, Peacock, and ESPN+ (Fox had yet to launch a dedicated paid streaming platform). Fox, NBC, and ESPN may continue to offer Spanish-language broadcasts of their games on their respective Spanish-language outlets Fox Deportes, Telemundo Deportes, and ESPN Deportes (CBS does not have a specific platform for Spanish-language sports content, but has sub-licensed Spanish-language rights to the Super Bowl). Changes beginning this regular season included the following:

- Flexible scheduling was expanded to include Monday Night Football, and increase the number of "cross-flexing" (switching) Sunday afternoon games between CBS and Fox. When the initial schedule was created, CBS and Fox were able to specify a limited number of games involving teams from their respective conference that they want to air, but otherwise the league would be free to schedule games regardless of conference. CBS and Fox would then also be able to protect one game each per week from getting flexed into another network.
- There are now three weeks featuring two Monday Night Football games split between ABC and ESPN, expanding from one in the 2022 season.
- NBC exclusively streams one national regular season game on Peacock per-season. Like other games exclusively on cable or streamed online, it is also made available on over-the-air television stations in each participating team's local market.
- Fox was given the option to air at least one Christmas Day game per season "as the schedule permits".

==== Other media rights ====
===== Linear television =====
NFL Network continued to televise select regular season games, including four International Series games and four late-season games.

The 2023 season was the second season of scheduling three games on Christmas Day, consisting of an afternoon doubleheader split between CBS and Fox, and that week's Monday Night Football contest, which exclusively aired on ABC due to ESPN's coverage of NBA Christmas games; with 27.2 million viewers, it was the second-highest rated Monday Night Football regular season broadcast since 1996. CBS' game also featured a youth-oriented broadcast on sister network Nickelodeon for the second consecutive year. With New Year's Day falling on a Monday this season, the Monday Night Football game that weekend was played on Saturday, December 30, in deference to the New Year's Day college football bowl games (such as the College Football Playoff aired by ESPN).

Originally, ABC was scheduled to air nine total games during the 2023 season, including 3 ESPN/ABC MNF simulcasts, the 3 total exclusive games during those weeks featuring MNF contests split between ABC and ESPN, the aforementioned Christmas night game, and the Week 18 doubleheader ESPN/ABC simulcast. On September 18, as part of schedule changes relating to the then-ongoing 2023 Hollywood labor disputes, ESPN announced that 10 MNF games that were originally going to be exclusive to ESPN would also be simulcast by ABC. This marked the first time since 2005 that ABC aired a full season of MNF.

===== Streaming =====
This is the second season of a 12-year deal with Amazon Prime Video and Twitch to exclusively stream Thursday Night Football. For 2023, flex scheduling has also been expanded to Thursday Night Football on a one-year trial. In addition, Thursday Night Football added a late-afternoon game on the Friday after Thanksgiving under the title Black Friday Football; unlike the other TNF games, whose free broadcasts are exclusive to sister live streaming platform Twitch, this game was also carried for free within the main Amazon Prime Video platform.

This was the second season of a 12-year deal that ESPN+ exclusively streamed one game—in this case, the International Series game in London on October 1. The game featured a youth-oriented alternate broadcast on ESPN+ and Disney+—Toy Story Funday Football—using the league's player tracking data to render a live animated version of the game using characters from Pixar's Toy Story franchise.

The league's streaming service NFL+ adds live access to NFL Network on its base tier and NFL RedZone on its premium tier. The service continued to live stream in-market regular season and postseason games on mobile devices only, radio broadcasts for all games, and most out-of-market preseason games on its base tier; and replays of all games and coaches film on its premium tier.

===== Postseason =====
Three of the Wild Card games were aired by NBC, holding rights to the Saturday afternoon game under its annual rotation with CBS and Fox since 2020, the Sunday night game under the third year of a separate seven-year deal, and the Saturday night game—which was streamed exclusively by Peacock under a one-year, $110 million deal. Peacock's game was sold on a stand-alone basis, as the league separated it from the broader TV rights deals. This marked the first time that an NFL playoff game is exclusively carried nationally by a streaming platform. ESPN/ABC entered its third year of their five-year deal for the Monday night Wild Card game, and the remaining two Sunday afternoon games were carried by CBS and Fox.

The four broadcast television partners will now each air one divisional playoff game per season. ESPN/ABC takes over the slot that was previously rotated between CBS and Fox.

CBS televised Super Bowl LVIII; in May 2023, CBS announced that it had sub-licensed the Spanish-language rights for Super Bowl LVIII to TelevisaUnivision, replacing ESPN Deportes, who held the agreement for the three previous Super Bowl games aired by CBS. For the first time, an alternate broadcast was also produced for the Super Bowl, with CBS producing a youth-oriented broadcast for Nickelodeon.

===== NFL Sunday Ticket =====
For residential customers in the United States, this is the first season out of a seven-year deal that the NFL Sunday Ticket out-of-market sports package will exclusively be on YouTube TV, as well as on YouTube Primetime Channels as a standalone subscription option. DirecTV declined to renew its exclusive rights to NFL Sunday Ticket, which it held since the package's debut in 1994. YouTube TV will stream NFL RedZone instead of producing a separate version like DirectTV did.

On March 28, 2023, the NFL announced that the commercial rights to Sunday Ticket would be held by EverPass Media, a new company funded by RedBird Capital and the NFL's venture capital arm 32 Equity. EverPass distributes NFL Sunday Ticket to bars, restaurants, and other commercial venues via non-exclusive agreements with existing cable and satellite providers. EverPass reached its first agreement with DirecTV on May 25, 2023.

===== Radio =====
This is the second season of the NFL's current radio contract with Westwood One, including rights to all primetime, marquee, and playoff games, along with audio coverage of other events such as the NFL draft and NFL Honors.

Compass Media, ESPN Radio, and Sports USA continued to broadcast select Sunday afternoon games nationally on radio.

==== Personnel changes ====
Greg Gumbel retired from working NFL games on CBS after the 2022 season. CBS replaced Gumbel on its roster of announcing teams with Chris Lewis, who was assigned to the number 7 broadcasting team with Jason McCourty and Ross Tucker. Other changes include Andrew Catalon being promoted to the number 4 team to replace Gumbel, joined by Atlanta Falcons legend Matt Ryan and Tiki Barber, Spero Dedes reuniting with Adam Archuleta on the number 5 team, and Tom McCarthy moving to the number 6 team with James Lofton and Jay Feely. Recently retired defensive end J. J. Watt joined The NFL Today studio team for select appearances.

ESPN replaced Steve Levy with Chris Fowler on the number 2 team with Dan Orlovsky, Louis Riddick and Laura Rutledge during Monday Night Football doubleheaders and ESPN+ exclusive international games. Scott Van Pelt replaced Suzy Kolber as host of Monday Night Countdown, where Steve Young and Booger McFarland were replaced by NFL Live's Marcus Spears and Ryan Clark.

Al Michaels was replaced by Noah Eagle as the secondary play-by-play man for Sunday Night Football. 2023 marks the first time that Michaels did not call a single NFL game for NBC since it picked up the SNF package in 2006.

==== Most watched regular season games ====
All times Eastern.

Rank	Date	Matchup			TV Network(s)	Streaming	Viewers (millions)	TV rating	Window	Significance
1	November 23, 4:30 p.m.	Washington Commanders	10–45	Dallas Cowboys	CBS	Paramount+	41.8	11.9	Thanksgiving	Commanders–Cowboys rivalry
2	November 23, 12:30 p.m.	Green Bay Packers	29–22	Detroit Lions	Fox	None	33.7	11.9	Thanksgiving	Lions–Packers rivalry
3	December 24, 4:25 p.m.	Dallas Cowboys	20–22	Miami Dolphins	Fox	None	31.5	13.0	Late DH (93%)	
4	November 26, 4:25 p.m.	Buffalo Bills	34–37 (OT)	Philadelphia Eagles	CBS	Paramount+	30.9	15.2	Late DH (69%)	
5	December 25, 1:00 p.m.	Las Vegas Raiders	20–14	Kansas City Chiefs	CBS/Nickelodeon	Paramount+	29.5	11.7	Christmas	Chiefs–Raiders rivalry
6	November 20, 8:15 p.m.	Philadelphia Eagles	21–17	Kansas City Chiefs	ESPN/ABC/ ESPN2	ESPN+	29.0	14.9	MNF	Super Bowl LVII rematch
7	December 25, 4:30 p.m.	New York Giants	25–33	Philadelphia Eagles	Fox	None	28.8	10.1	Christmas	Eagles–Giants rivalry
8	December 3, 4:25 p.m.	San Francisco 49ers	42–19	Philadelphia Eagles	Fox	None	27.7	13.8	Late DH (84%)	2022 NFC Championship Game rematch
9	December 25, 8:15 p.m.	Baltimore Ravens	33–19	San Francisco 49ers	ABC	ESPN+	27.6	11.4	Christmas MNF	
10	November 5, 4:25 p.m.	Dallas Cowboys	23–28	Philadelphia Eagles	Fox	None	27.1	13.3	Late DH (91%)	Cowboys–Eagles rivalry

- DH = doubleheader; MNF = Monday Night Football.
- TV networks include corresponding Spanish network broadcasts through Telemundo, Universo, ESPN Deportes, Fox Deportes, and SAP.
- For regional windows (such as Late DH), viewership figures include across all regional games on the indicated network and timeslot (for single games this includes games aired in both the early and late slots). Percentage under "Window" refers to proportion of U.S. media markets that received the indicated featured game.

=== International ===
On February 7, 2023, the NFL announced a new deal with DAZN to become the worldwide rightsholder of its NFL Game Pass streaming service outside of the U.S. and China. DAZN had already held the rights to Game Pass and Sunday Ticket in Canada.

In the United Kingdom, Sky Sports continued to broadcast two selected non-national games live every Sunday, one early and one late window game respectively. The Sky Sports Mix channel continued to air a live simulcast of NFL Network's NFL RedZone whip-around show. Sky Sports also continued to broadcast every Sunday Night Football, Monday Night Football (including doubleheaders) and Thursday Night Football game live.

Nearly into the end of the regular season, Taiwan's ELTA Sports has become exclusive home for NFL through both OTT & Chunghwa Telecom MOD platform. Their coverage was available in Chinese commentary in addition to English via SAP.
