= Ferrell Edmunds =

American football player (born 1965)

No. 80, 82
- Position: Tight end

Personal information
- Born: April 16, 1965 (age 61); South Boston, Virginia, U.S.
- Listed height: 6 ft 6 in (1.98 m)
- Listed weight: 254 lb (115 kg)

Career information
- High school: George Washington (Danville, Virginia)
- College: Maryland
- NFL draft: 1988: 3rd round, 73rd overall pick

Career history
- Miami Dolphins (1988–1992); Seattle Seahawks (1993–1994)

Awards and highlights
- Second-team All-Pro (1989); 2× Pro Bowl (1989, 1990); Third-team All-American (1987); First-team All-ACC (1987)

Career NFL statistics
- Receptions: 148
- Receiving yards: 1,894
- Receiving touchdowns: 12
- Stats at Pro Football Reference

Ferrell Edmunds Jr. (born April 16, 1965) is an American former professional football player who was a tight end in the National Football League (NFL). He played college football for the Maryland Terrapins and was selected by the Miami Dolphins in the third round of the 1988 NFL draft.

Edmunds currently coaches the varsity football program at Dan River High School in Ringgold, Virginia. His three sons Trey, Terrell and Tremaine have all played in the NFL. Tremaine plays for the New York Giants. Terrell plays for the Las Vegas Raiders.

Edmunds graduated from George Washington High School (Danville, Virginia) in 1983.

Pre-draft measurables
Height	Weight	Hand span	Bench press
6 ft 6 in (1.98 m)	241 lb (109 kg)	10 1/2 in (0.27 m)	18 reps
All values from NFL Combine

== NFL career statistics ==
Legend
**Bold**	Career high

=== Regular season ===
Year	Team	Games		Receiving				
Year	Team	GP	GS	Rec	Yds	Avg	Lng	TD
1988	MIA	16	14	**33**	**575**	**17.4**	**80**	**3**
1989	MIA	16	16	32	382	11.9	30	**3**
1990	MIA	16	16	31	446	14.4	35	1
1991	MIA	8	6	11	118	10.7	22	2
1992	MIA	10	5	10	91	9.1	15	1
1993	SEA	16	16	24	239	10.0	32	2
1994	SEA	7	7	7	43	6.1	8	0
Career		89	80	148	1,894	12.8	80	12

=== Postseason ===
Year	Team	Games		Receiving				
Year	Team	GP	GS	Rec	Yds	Avg	Lng	TD
1990	MIA	2	2	**5**	**70**	**14.0**	**37**	0
1992	MIA	2	0	0	0	0.0	0	0
Career		4	2	5	70	14.0	37	0
