= Terrell Edmunds =

American football player (born 1997)

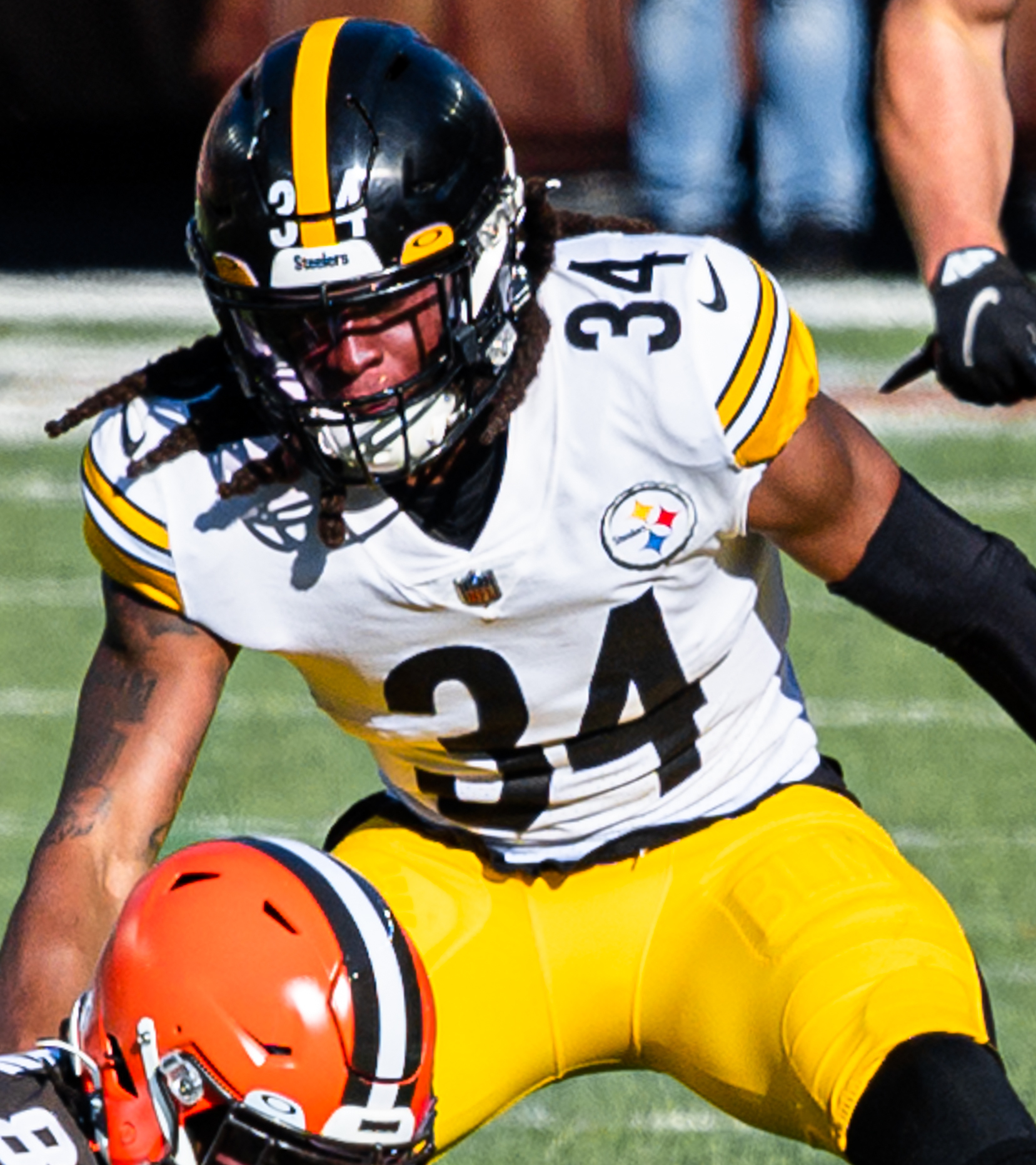
- Edmunds with the Pittsburgh Steelers in 2021

Profile
- Position: Safety

Personal information
- Born: January 20, 1997 (age 29); Danville, Virginia, U.S.
- Listed height: 6 ft 1 in (1.85 m)
- Listed weight: 217 lb (98 kg)

Career information
- High school: Dan River (Ringgold, Virginia)
- College: Virginia Tech (2015–2017)
- NFL draft: 2018: 1st round, 28th overall pick

Career history
- Pittsburgh Steelers (2018–2022); Philadelphia Eagles (2023); Tennessee Titans (2023); Jacksonville Jaguars (2024); Pittsburgh Steelers (2024); Los Angeles Chargers (2024)*; Las Vegas Raiders (2025)
- * Offseason or practice squad member only

Awards and highlights
- Third-team All-ACC (2017)

Career NFL statistics as of 2025
- Total tackles: 465
- Sacks: 7.5
- Forced fumbles: 1
- Fumble recoveries: 1
- Pass deflections: 28
- Interceptions: 6
- Stats at Pro Football Reference

FeDerius Terrell Edmunds (born January 20, 1997) is an American professional football safety. He played college football for the Virginia Tech Hokies and was selected by the Pittsburgh Steelers in the first round of the 2018 NFL draft.

== Early life ==
Edmunds attended Dan River High School in Ringgold, Virginia. Terrell started at both running back and defensive back over three varsity seasons but primarily focused on tailback, rushing for a career total of 2,438 rushing yards and 33 touchdowns on 263 carries, averaging 9.3 yards per carry. He also caught 43 passes for 396 yards and 3 receiving touchdowns, while finishing his defensive career with 112 tackles, 5 interceptions, and 3 fumble recoveries. He committed to Virginia Tech to play college football.

== College career ==
Edmunds played a key defensive role at Virginia Tech starting at strong safety and sharing time at middle linebacker from 2015 to 2017. After his junior season in 2017, he decided to forgo his senior year and enter the 2018 NFL draft. He finished his career with 196 tackles, six interceptions, and 1.5 sacks.

== Professional career ==
=== Pre-draft ===
On January 6, 2018, Edmunds announced his decision to forgo his remaining eligibility and enter the 2018 NFL draft. Edmunds and his brother Tremaine released joint statements on their Twitter accounts regarding their declaration for the draft. He attended the NFL Scouting Combine in Indianapolis, but was unable to perform all of the combine and positional drills due to a pre-existing shoulder injury and after developing cramps.

External videos
- Terrell Edmunds' NFL Combine Workout
- Terrell Edmunds' 40-yard dash
- Terrell Edmunds' 41.5" vertical jump

On March 14, 2018, Edmunds participated at Virginia Tech's pro day, but opted to stand on his combine numbers and only performed positional drills. At the conclusion of the pre-draft process, Edmunds was projected to be a third round pick by the majority of NFL draft experts and scouts. He was also ranked the third best strong safety in the draft by DraftScout.com and was ranked the sixth best safety by NFL analyst Mike Mayock.

Pre-draft measurables
Height	Weight	Arm length	Hand span	Wingspan	40-yard dash	10-yard split	20-yard split	Vertical jump	Broad jump
6 ft 0 1/2 in (1.84 m)	217 lb (98 kg)	32 3/4 in (0.83 m)	10 1/2 in (0.27 m)	6 ft 7 in (2.01 m)	4.47 s	1.52 s	2.64 s	41.5 in (1.05 m)	11 ft 2 in (3.40 m)
All values from NFL Combine

=== Pittsburgh Steelers (first stint) ===
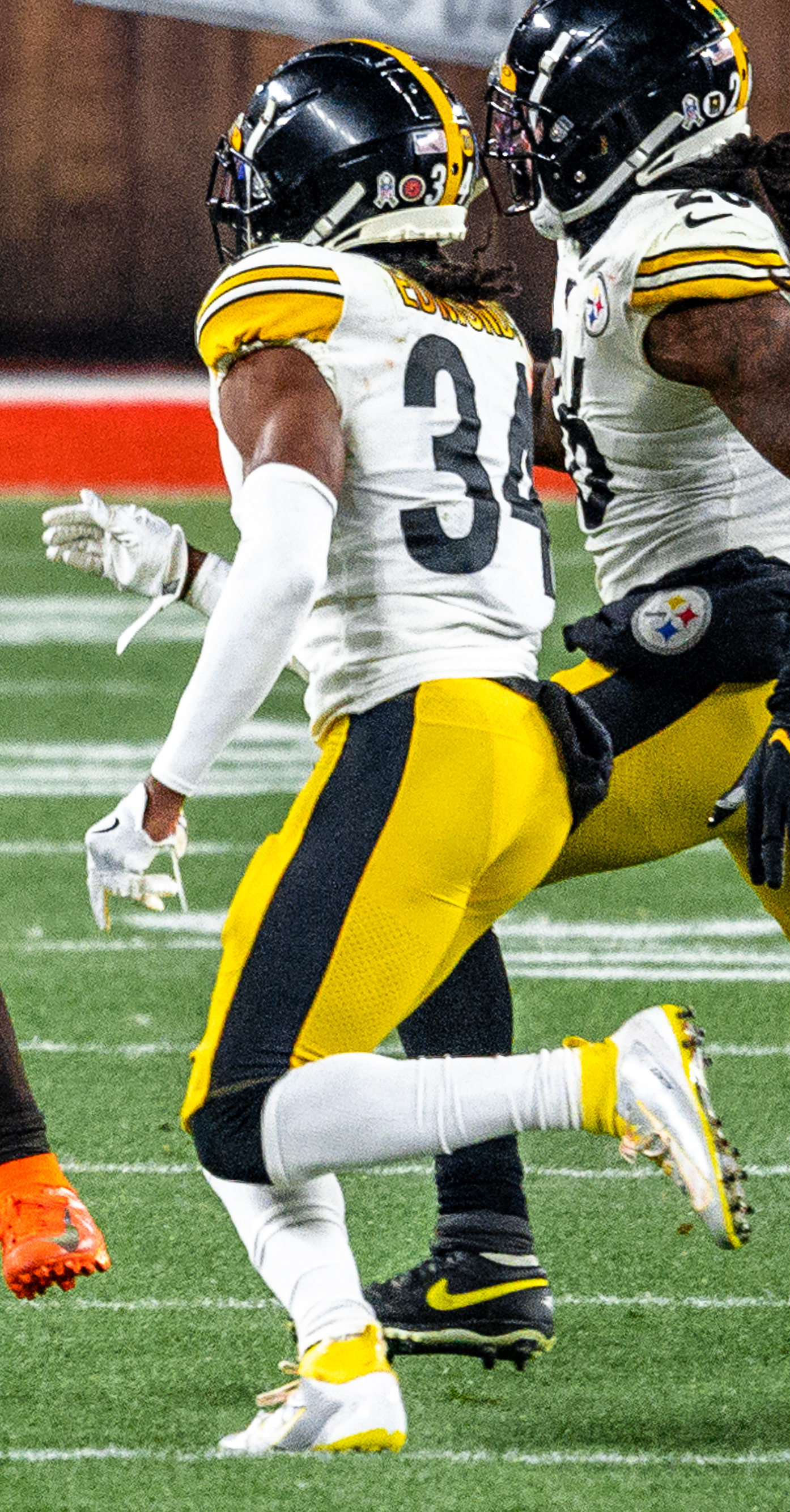
Edmunds in 2019

==== 2018 ====
The Pittsburgh Steelers selected Edmunds in the first round (28th overall) of the 2018 NFL draft. Edmunds was the third safety drafted in 2018. His brother, Tremaine, was drafted earlier in the first round (16th overall) by the Buffalo Bills. Terrell and Tremaine became the first set of brothers to both be drafted in the first round in the same draft.

External videos
- Steelers draft Terrell Edmunds 28th overall
- Instant Draft Analysis: Terrell Edmunds

On July 24, 2018, the Pittsburgh Steelers signed Edmunds to a four-year, $10.80 million contract that includes a signing bonus of $6 million. Throughout training camp, Edmunds competed to be a starting safety against veterans Morgan Burnett and Sean Davis. Head coach Mike Tomlin named Edmunds the backup strong safety, behind Morgan Burnett, to begin the regular season.

External videos
- Edmunds makes first career interception
- Edmunds bullrushes Rivers for first NFL sack

He made his professional regular season debut and first career start in the Steelers’ season-opener at the Cleveland Browns and broke up one pass attempt during a 21–21 tie. Edmunds started in place of Morgan Burnett in the season-opener and became the permanent starting strong safety in Week 3 after Burnett was inactive for four games (Weeks 3–6) due to a groin injury. On September 24, 2018, Edmunds recorded one tackle, deflected a pass, and made his first career interception during a 30–27 win at the Tampa Bay Buccaneers in Week 3. Edmunds intercepted a pass by Buccaneers’ quarterback Ryan Fitzpatrick that was intended for wide receiver Mike Evans, and returned it for a 35-yard gain during the second quarter. In Week 12, Edmunds collected a season-high nine solo during a 24–17 loss at the Denver Broncos. On December 2, 2018, he recorded eight combined tackles, deflected a pass, and made his first career sack as the Steelers lost 33–30 against the Los Angeles Chargers in Week 13. He finished his rookie season in 2018 with 78 combined tackles (55 solo), four pass deflections, one sack, and one interception in 16 games and 15 starts. He received an overall grade of 63.7 from Pro Football Focus, which ranked 66th among all safeties in 2018.

==== 2019 ====
In Week 2 against the Seattle Seahawks, Edmunds recorded a team high 11 tackles as the Steelers lost 26-28. Edmunds started all 16 games in his second season, recording 105 tackles, two for loss, and 3 pass defenses.

==== 2020 ====
In Week 2 against the Broncos, Edmunds recorded his first sack of the season on Jeff Driskel during the 26–21 win. In Week 11 against the Jacksonville Jaguars, Edmunds recorded his first two interceptions of the season off of passes thrown by Jake Luton during the 27–3 win.

==== 2021 ====
The Steelers declined to exercise the fifth-year option on Edmunds' contract on May 3, 2021, making him a free agent after the 2021 season.

==== 2022 ====
On April 25, 2022, Edmunds signed a one-year deal to return to the Steelers.

=== Philadelphia Eagles ===
On March 24, 2023, Edmunds signed a one-year deal with the Philadelphia Eagles.

=== Tennessee Titans ===
On October 23, 2023, the Eagles traded Edmunds to the Tennessee Titans along with a fifth-round pick and a sixth-round pick in the 2024 NFL draft for safety Kevin Byard.

=== Jacksonville Jaguars ===
On May 16, 2024, Edmunds signed with the Jacksonville Jaguars. He was released on August 27, and re-signed to the practice squad. The Jaguars promoted him to the active roster for their Week 1 contest against the Miami Dolphins.

=== Pittsburgh Steelers (second stint) ===
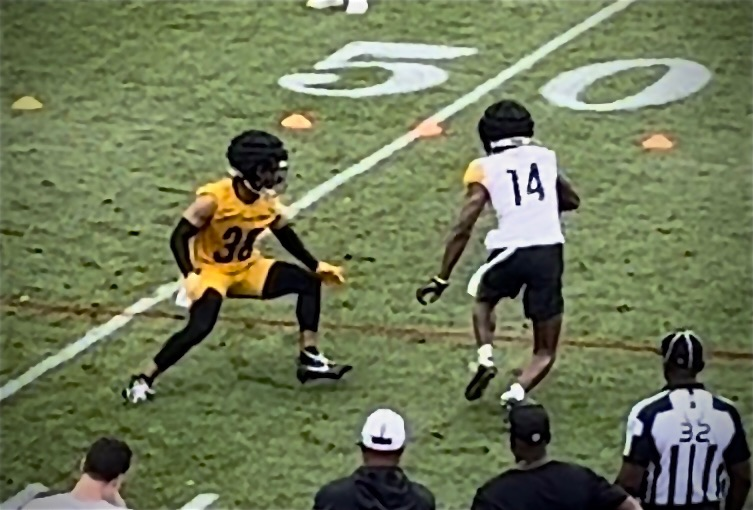
Edmunds during a one-on-one drill with George Pickens in 2024

On September 10, 2024, the Steelers signed Edmunds off the Jaguars' practice squad.

After not seeing the field during the first three games of the season, Edmunds would see action during the Steelers Week 4 loss to the Indianapolis Colts. He would record one tackle and one assisted tackle. Edmunds was released on November 9, 2024.

=== Los Angeles Chargers ===
On January 2, 2025, the Los Angeles Chargers signed Edmunds to their practice squad.

=== Las Vegas Raiders ===
On August 10, 2025, Edmunds signed with the Las Vegas Raiders. He was released on August 26 as part of final roster cuts and re-signed to the practice squad the next day. Edmunds was promoted to the active roster on December 24.

== NFL career statistics ==
Legend
**Bold**	Career high

=== Regular season ===
Year	Team	Games		Tackles					Interceptions						Fumbles			
Year	Team	GP	GS	Cmb	Solo	Ast	TfL	Sck	PD	Int	Yds	Avg	Lng	TD	FF	FR	Yds	TD
2018	PIT	16	15	78	55	23	1	1.0	4	1	**35**	**35.0**	**35**	0	0	**1**	0	0
2019	PIT	16	16	**105**	**71**	**34**	2	0.0	3	0	0	0.0	0	0	0	0	0	0
2020	PIT	15	12	68	46	22	1	1.0	**8**	**2**	11	5.5	7	0	0	0	0	0
2021	PIT	17	17	89	63	26	**8**	1.0	6	**2**	15	7.5	15	0	0	0	0	0
2022	PIT	15	15	70	41	29	3	2.0	5	0	0	0.0	0	0	0	0	0	0
2023	PHI	7	3	28	20	8	0	0.0	0	0	0	0.0	0	0	**1**	0	0	0
2023	TEN	9	1	20	14	6	2	**2.5**	2	1	2	2.0	2	0	0	0	0	0
2024	JAX	1	0	0	0	0	0	0.0	0	0	0	0.0	0	0	0	0	0	0
2024	PIT	5	0	7	5	2	0	0.0	0	0	0	0.0	0	0	0	0	0	0
2025	LV	1	0	0	0	0	0	0.0	0	0	0	0.0	0	0	0	0	0	0
Career		102	79	465	310	65	17	7.5	28	6	63	10.5	35	0	1	1	0	0

=== Postseason ===
Year	Team	Games		Tackles					Interceptions						Fumbles			
Year	Team	GP	GS	Cmb	Solo	Ast	TfL	Sck	PD	Int	Yds	Avg	Lng	TD	FF	FR	Yds	TD
2020	PIT	1	1	**6**	3	**3**	**1**	0.0	**1**	0	0	0.0	0	0	0	0	0	0
2021	PIT	1	1	**6**	**6**	0	0	0.0	0	0	0	0.0	0	0	0	0	0	0
Career		2	2	12	9	3	1	0.0	1	0	0	0.0	0	0	0	0	0	0

== Personal life ==
His brothers, Trey and Tremaine also played college football at Virginia Tech. Trey and Tremaine also play in the NFL. Trey is a free agent that has played for the Saints and Steelers while Tremaine plays for the New York Giants. Their father, Ferrell Edmunds, also played in the NFL as a tight end. Ferrell was a two-time Pro Bowler with the Miami Dolphins as a tight end. Along with Tremaine, he was part of the first set of brothers to be drafted in the first round of the same NFL draft.
