= Lindsey Lee Moore =

American politician (1892–1983)

Member of the Virginia House of Delegates from the Pittsylvania County district
- In office 1946–1956

Personal details
- Born: April 26, 1892 Ringgold, Virginia, U.S.
- Died: September 4, 1983 (aged 91) Danville, Virginia, U.S.
- Resting place: Mountain View Cemetery
- Spouse: Doris Clapton (m. 1958)
- Education: Washington and Lee University
- Occupation: Politician; lawyer; farmer

Lindsey Lee Moore (April 26, 1892 – September 4, 1983) was an American politician from Virginia. He served in the Virginia House of Delegates from 1946 to 1956.

== Early life ==
Lindsey Lee Moore was born on April 26, 1892, in Ringgold, Virginia, to Mollie (née Sergeant) and Samuel Lindsey Moore. He attended Washington and Lee University in 1916. In 1917, he enlisted in the United States Army and served in France for two years during World War I. He returned to Washington and Lee University after and graduated in 1921. His brother Arthur was a survivor of the Bataan Death March.

== Career ==
Moore practiced law in Atlanta, Georgia, until 1926. He then moved to Pittsylvania County, Virginia, to practice law and farmed there from 1926 to 1978.

Moore served in the Virginia House of Delegates, representing Pittsylvania County, from 1946 to 1956.

== Personal life ==
Moore married Doris Clapton on October 4, 1958. He was a member of Sandy Creek Baptist Church. He lived in Ringgold.

Moore died on September 4, 1983, in Memorial Hospital in Danville. He was buried in Mountain View Cemetery.
