= Tremaine Edmunds =

American football player (born 1998)

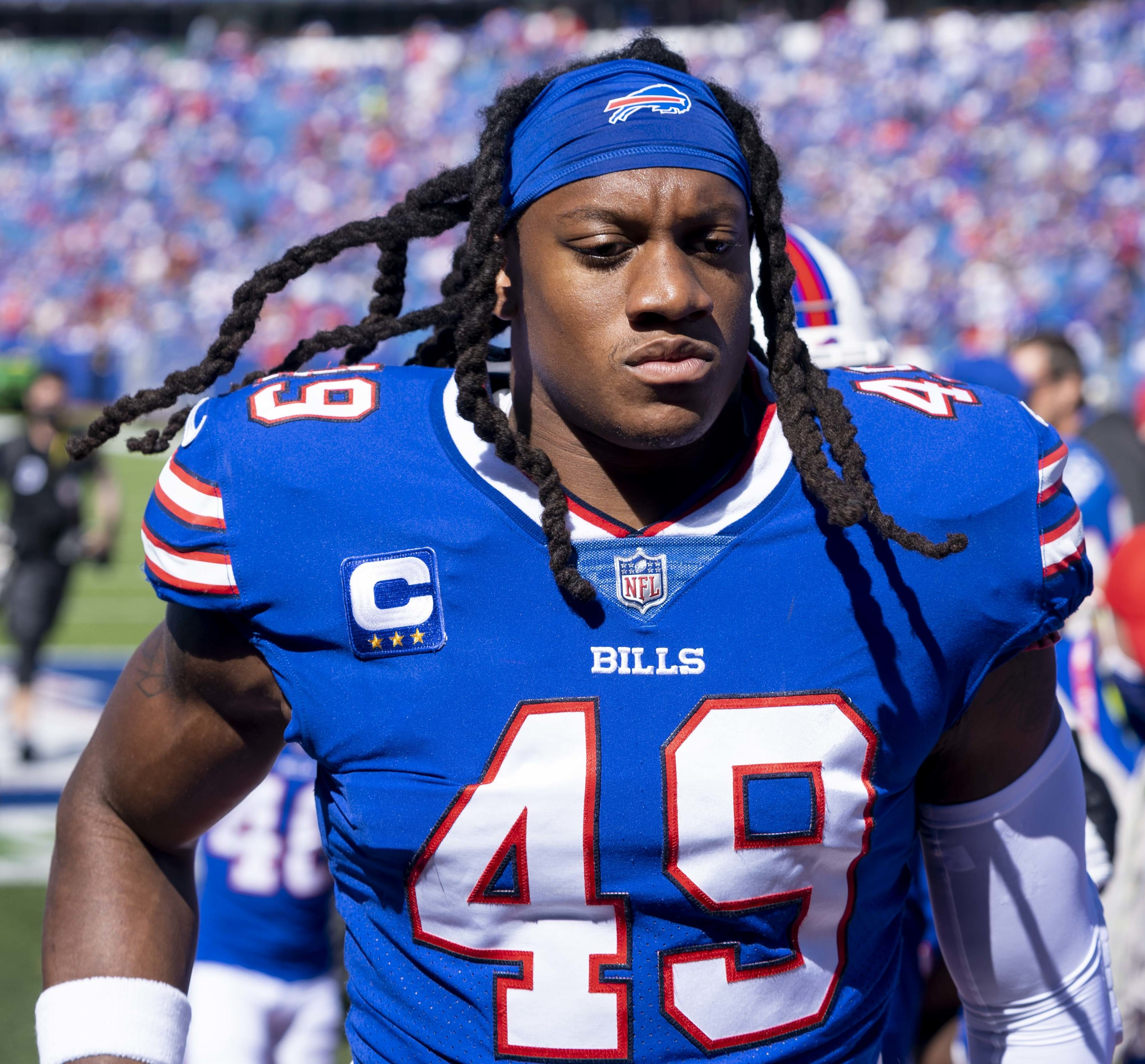
- Edmunds with the Buffalo Bills in 2021

No. 49 – New York Giants
- Position: Linebacker
- Roster status: Injured reserve

Personal information
- Born: May 2, 1998 (age 28); Danville, Virginia, U.S.
- Listed height: 6 ft 4 in (1.93 m)
- Listed weight: 251 lb (114 kg)

Career information
- High school: Dan River (Ringgold, Virginia)
- College: Virginia Tech (2015–2017)
- NFL draft: 2018: 1st round, 16th overall pick

Career history
- Buffalo Bills (2018–2022); Chicago Bears (2023–2025); New York Giants (2026–present)

Awards and highlights
- 2× Pro Bowl (2019, 2020); First-team All-ACC (2017); Second-team All-ACC (2016)

Career NFL statistics as of 2026
- Total tackles: 950
- Sacks: 10.5
- Forced fumbles: 4
- Fumble recoveries: 2
- Interceptions: 14
- Pass deflections: 61
- Defensive touchdowns: 1
- Stats at Pro Football Reference

Fe'Zahn Tremaine Edmunds (born May 2, 1998) is an American professional football linebacker for the New York Giants of the National Football League (NFL). He played college football for the Virginia Tech Hokies and was selected by the Buffalo Bills in the first round of the 2018 NFL draft.

== Early life ==
Edmunds attended Dan River High School in Ringgold, Virginia. As a three-year letter, Edmunds appeared at linebacker, defensive end, and tight end. During his junior season alone, Edmunds accumulated 123 tackles, four sacks, two interceptions, two blocked kicks, and two forced fumbles, and was nominated for Virginia's defensive player of the year. He would miss most of his senior season due to an injury, but he was nonetheless named all-state at both tight end and linebacker. A 3-star recruit, Edmunds committed to play football at Virginia Tech over various offers from Cincinnati, East Carolina, Hampton, Kentucky, Maryland, North Carolina, USC, and Virginia, among others.

== College career ==
Edmunds played at Virginia Tech from 2015 to 2017 under head coaches Frank Beamer and Justin Fuente. As a junior in 2017, he was a finalist for the Butkus Award after recording 108 tackles and 5.5 sacks. After the season, he decided to forgo his senior year and enter the 2018 NFL draft. He finished his career with 213 tackles, 10 sacks, and 1 interception.

== Professional career ==
=== Pre-draft ===
On January 10, 2018, Edmunds released a statement through Twitter announcing his decision to forgo his remaining eligibility and enter the 2018 NFL draft. Edmunds attended the NFL Scouting Combine in Indianapolis and completed the majority of drills, but opted to skip the short shuttle, three-cone drill, and vertical jump. Among all linebackers performing at the NFL Combine, Edmunds finished fifth in the 40-yard dash, 12th in the broad jump, and tied for 14th in the bench press.

External videos
- Tremaine Edmunds' NFL Combine Workout
- Tremaine Edmunds runs a 4.54s 40-yard dash
- 2018 NFL Draft Profile: Tremaine Edmunds

On March 14, 2018, Edmunds participated at Virginia Tech's pro day, but opted to stand on his combine numbers and only performed positional drills. He attended pre-draft visits with the Buffalo Bills, Green Bay Packers, and San Francisco 49ers. At the conclusion of the pre-draft process, Edmunds was projected to be a first-round pick by NFL draft experts and scouts. He was ranked as the top outside linebacker prospect in the draft by DraftScout.com and ESPN analyst Jeff Legwold. He was also ranked as the second best stack linebacker by Sports Illustrated and the second best linebacker in the draft by NFL analyst Mike Mayock.

Pre-draft measurables
Height	Weight	Arm length	Hand span	Wingspan	40-yard dash	10-yard split	20-yard split	Broad jump	Bench press
6 ft 4 1/2 in (1.94 m)	253 lb (115 kg)	34 1/2 in (0.88 m)	9 3/8 in (0.24 m)	6 ft 11 in (2.11 m)	4.54 s	1.60 s	2.65 s	9 ft 9 in (2.97 m)	19 reps
All values from NFL Combine

=== Buffalo Bills ===
==== 2018 ====
The Buffalo Bills selected Edmunds in the first round (16th overall) of the 2018 NFL Draft. In order to select Edmunds, the Bills traded their first (22nd overall) and third round (65th overall) picks to the Baltimore Ravens in exchange for a first-round pick (16th overall) and a fifth-round pick (154th overall) in the 2018 NFL Draft. Edmunds became the second youngest player to be drafted in NFL history at 19 years 11 months 24 days old, only behind Amobi Okoye at 19 years old 10 months 18 days, in 2007. Edmunds' brother, Terrell, went on to be drafted in the first round (28th overall) by the Pittsburgh Steelers. Terrell's selection earned them the distinction of becoming the first pair of brothers to be drafted in the first round of the same draft in NFL history.

External videos
- Bills draft Tremaine Edmunds 16th overall
- Instant Draft Grade: Tremaine Edmunds

On May 12, 2018, the Bills signed Edmunds to a fully guaranteed four-year, $12.65 million contract that includes a signing bonus of $7.28 million. He entered training camp slated as the starting middle linebacker after Preston Brown departed in free agency. Head coach Sean McDermott named Edmunds the starting middle linebacker to begin the regular season. He started alongside outside linebackers Matt Milano and Lorenzo Alexander.

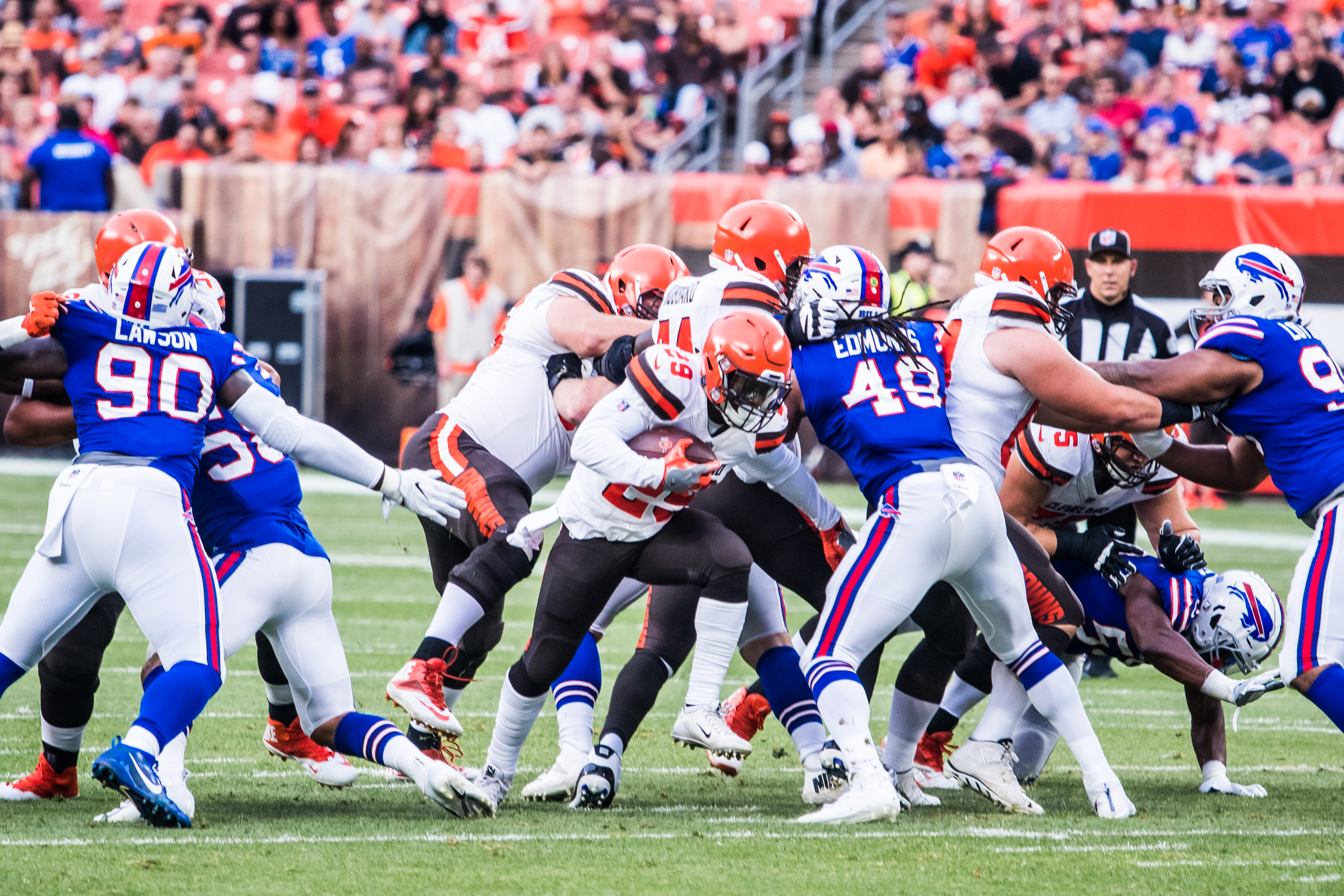
Edmunds (#49) playing against the Cleveland Browns in the 2018 preseason

He made his professional regular season debut and first career start in the Bills' season-opener at the Baltimore Ravens and recorded seven combined tackles, deflected two passes, and made his first career sack during their 47–3 loss. Edmunds made his first career sack on Ravens' quarterback Joe Flacco for less than a one-yard loss in the second quarter. Edmunds recorded his first NFL interception against the New York Jets in week 14, picking off Sam Darnold. At age 20, he became the youngest NFL player ever to record an interception. Following a strong month of play, Edmunds was named the NFL defensive rookie of the month in December after recording 43 tackles, 4 passes defended, 1 sack and 2 interceptions. Overall, he recorded 121 total tackles on the year with two sacks, two interceptions, and two forced fumbles.

==== 2019 ====
Edmunds was named a team captain at the beginning of the year. He notched his first sack of the season in week 10 against the Cleveland Browns, taking down quarterback Baker Mayfield in the endzone for a Bills safety. In week 11 against the Miami Dolphins, Edmunds recorded a team high 12 tackles and made a half sack on Ryan Fitzpatrick in the 37–20 win. In week 14 against the Baltimore Ravens, Edmunds recorded 8 tackles and his first interception of the season off a pass thrown by Lamar Jackson during the 24–17 loss. In the AFC wild card game against the Houston Texans, Edmunds recorded a team high 12 tackles, sacked quarterback Deshaun Watson once, and recovered a fumble forced by Tre'Davious White on DeAndre Hopkins during the 22–19 overtime loss. Edmunds started every game in his sophomore season, recording 1 interception, 1 1/2 sacks, and 115 tackles. Edmunds was named to the 2020 Pro Bowl, the first Pro Bowl of his career, in replacement of the injured Dont'a Hightower.

==== 2020 ====
In Week 9 against the Seattle Seahawks, Edmunds recorded a team high 11 tackles and sacked Russell Wilson once during the 44–34 win. Despite dealing with a lingering shoulder injury suffered during week 1 against the Jets, Edmunds was able to garner his second Pro-Bowl selection with his play after recovering. In 15 games, Edmunds recorded 119 tackles (77 solo), two sacks, four tackles for a loss and three passes defended.

In Buffalo's two playoff wins, he recorded nine tackles each game and broke up three passes. He would then record seven tackles in Buffalo's 38–24 loss to the Chiefs in the AFC Championship game.

==== 2021 ====
In May 2021, the Bills exercised the fifth-year option on Edmunds' rookie contract, worth a guaranteed $12.716 million for the 2022 season.

In Week 4, Edmunds recorded six tackles and an interception in a 40–0 win over the Texans, earning AFC Defensive Player of the Week.

=== Chicago Bears ===
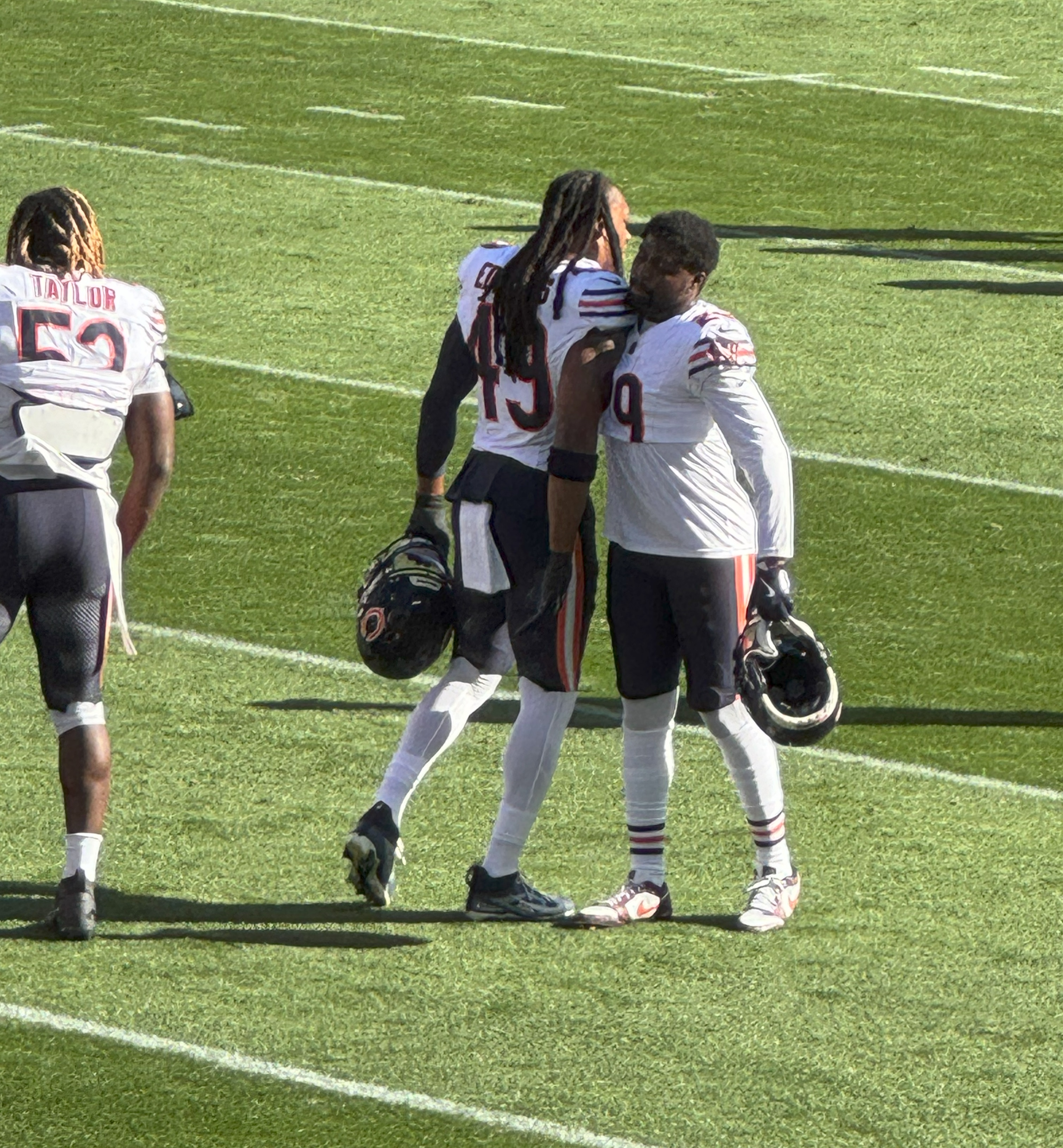
Edmunds (center) with Tyrique Stevenson in 2024

On March 15, 2023, Edmunds signed a four-year, $72 million contract with the Chicago Bears. In Week 2, in a loss against the Tampa Bay Buccaneers, Edmunds recorded a team-leading 16 total tackles. During the Week 15 loss to the Cleveland Browns, Edmunds recorded an interception off of Joe Flacco and returned it 45 yards for his first NFL touchdown.

Edmunds began the 2025 season as one of Chicago's starting linebackers, recording four interceptions, nine pass deflections, one sack, and 89 combined tackles across 10 starts. In Week 11 against the Minnesota Vikings, Edmunds suffered a groin injury that caused him to be placed on injured reserve on November 22, 2025. He was activated on December 20, ahead of the team's Week 16 against the Green Bay Packers.

On March 6, 2026, Edmunds was released by the Bears.

=== New York Giants ===
On March 12, 2026, Edmunds signed a three-year, $36 million contract with the New York Giants. On October 23, he was placed on season-ending injured reserve following a torn chest muscle suffered in the Giants' Week 6 matchup against the New Orleans Saints.

== NFL career statistics ==
Legend
	Led the league
**Bold**	Career high

=== Regular season ===
Year	Team	Games		Tackles							Interceptions						Fumbles				
Year	Team	GP	GS	Cmb	Solo	Ast	TFL	QBH	Sck	Sfty	PD	Int	Yds	Avg	Lng	TD	FF	FR	Yds	Avg	TD
2018	BUF	15	15	**121**	**80**	41	5	**7**	**2.0**	0	**12**	2	19	9.5	17	0	**2**	0	0	0.0	0
2019	BUF	16	16	115	66	49	**10**	4	1.5	**1**	9	1	0	0.0	0	0	0	0	0	0.0	0
2020	BUF	15	15	119	77	42	4	3	**2.0**	0	3	0	0	0.0	0	0	0	0	0	0.0	0
2021	BUF	15	15	108	70	38	7	1	0.0	0	4	1	4	4.0	4	0	0	0	0	0.0	0
2022	BUF	13	13	102	66	36	6	3	1.0	0	7	1	4	4.0	4	0	0	0	0	0.0	0
2023	CHI	15	15	113	69	44	5	0	0.0	0	7	**4**	**61**	**15.3**	**45**	**1**	1	**1**	0	0.0	0
2024	CHI	17	17	110	60	50	3	3	1.0	0	8	1	0	0.0	0	0	1	0	0	0.0	0
2025	CHI	13	13	112	61	**51**	3	3	1.0	0	9	**4**	10	2.5	10	0	0	**1**	0	0.0	0
2026	NYG	6	6	50	32	18	3	3	**2.0**	0	2	0	0	0.0	0	0	0	0	0	0.0	0
Career		125	125	950	581	369	46	27	10.5	1	61	14	98	7.0	45	1	4	2	0	0.0	0

=== Postseason ===
Year	Team	Games		Tackles							Interceptions						Fumbles				
Year	Team	GP	GS	Cmb	Solo	Ast	TfL	QBH	Sck	Sfty	PD	Int	Yds	Avg	Lng	TD	FF	FR	Yds	Avg	TD
2019	BUF	1	1	12	8	4	**1**	**2**	**1.0**	0	0	0	0	0.0	0	0	0	**1**	0	0.0	0
2020	BUF	3	3	**25**	**14**	**11**	0	**2**	0.0	0	3	0	0	0.0	0	0	0	0	0	0.0	0
2021	BUF	2	2	17	13	4	0	1	0.0	0	0	0	0	0.0	0	0	0	0	0	0.0	0
2022	BUF	2	2	17	**14**	3	**1**	0	0.0	0	**5**	0	0	0.0	0	0	0	0	0	0.0	0
2025	CHI	2	2	13	9	4	0	0	0.0	0	1	0	0	0.0	0	0	0	0	0	0.0	0
Career		10	10	84	58	26	2	5	1.0	0	9	0	0	0.0	0	0	0	1	0	0.0	0

== Personal life ==
His brothers, Trey and Terrell also played college football at Virginia Tech. Terrell was also drafted in the 2018 NFL Draft in the first round by the Pittsburgh Steelers while Trey is a free agent who has played for the Pittsburgh Steelers and New Orleans Saints. Their father, Ferrell Edmunds, also played in the NFL, appearing in two Pro Bowls. Tremaine and Terrell Edmunds are the first set of brothers to be drafted in the first round of the same NFL draft.
