= Ringgold, Virginia =

Ringgold
- Unincorporated community
- Location within Virginia Ringgold (the United States)
- Coordinates: 36°36′29″N 79°17′43″W
- Country: United States
- State: Virginia
- County: Pittsylvania
- Elevation: 574 ft (175 m)
- Time zone: UTC-5 (Eastern (EST))
  - Summer (DST): UTC-4 (EDT)
- GNIS feature ID: 1499962

Ringgold is an unincorporated community in Pittsylvania County in the U.S. state of Virginia with a postal zip code 24586. The local high school is Dan River High School.

The community was named after Maj. Samuel Ringgold, a hero of the Battle of Palo Alto in the U.S.-Mexican War.

Ringgold lies twenty minutes' drive away from Danville, Virginia. Southern Ringgold touches the southern border of Virginia and North Carolina.

== Notable people ==
- Trey Edmunds, running back for the Pittsburgh Steelers
- Tremaine Edmunds, linebacker for the Chicago Bears
- Terrell Edmunds, safety for the Philadelphia Eagles
- Lindsey Lee Moore (1892–1983), member of the Virginia House of Delegates
