= Trey Edmunds =

American football player (born 1994)

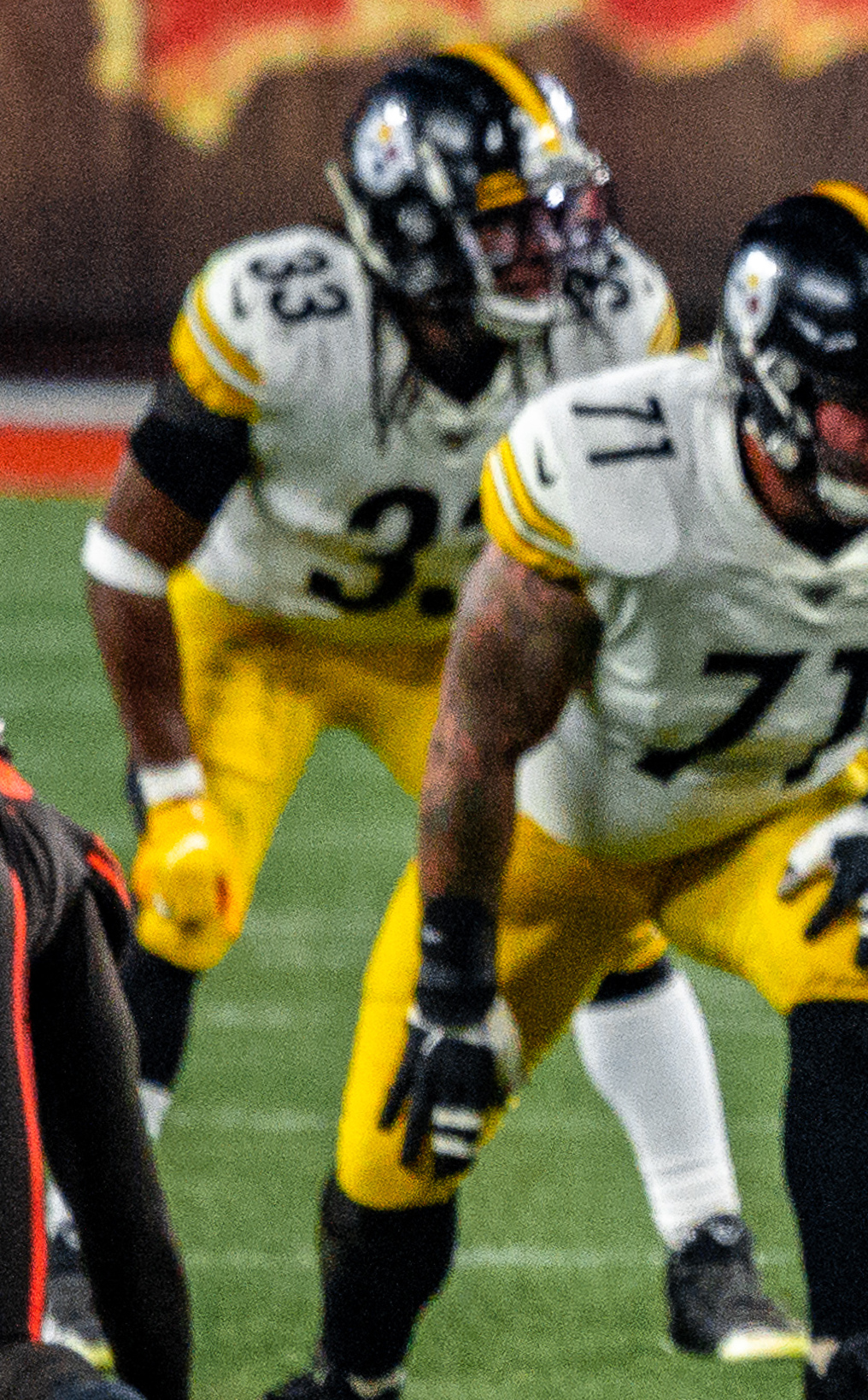
- Edmunds (33) with the Pittsburgh Steelers in 2019

No. 33
- Position: Running back

Personal information
- Born: December 30, 1994 (age 31); Danville, Virginia, U.S.
- Listed height: 6 ft 1 in (1.85 m)
- Listed weight: 223 lb (101 kg)

Career information
- High school: Dan River (Ringgold, Virginia)
- College: Virginia Tech (2013–2015); Maryland (2016)
- NFL draft: 2017: undrafted

Career history
- New Orleans Saints (2017); Pittsburgh Steelers (2018–2022)

Career NFL statistics
- Rushing yards: 140
- Rushing average: 4.5
- Rushing touchdowns: 1
- Receptions: 6
- Receiving yards: 48
- Interceptions: 1
- Stats at Pro Football Reference

Ferrell "Trey" Edmunds III (born December 30, 1994) is an American former professional football player who was a running back in the National Football League (NFL). He played college football for the Virginia Tech Hokies and Maryland Terrapins and signed with the New Orleans Saints as an undrafted free agent in 2017.

== Early life ==
Edmunds attended and played high school football at Dan River High School. Over three seasons, Trey started both ways as a running back and linebacker. He rushed for a career 2,596 yards and 33 touchdowns on 283 carries, which accounted for 61.5 percent of Dan River's offense. On defense, he also recorded 143 tackles, two sacks, four interceptions (two returned for touchdowns), two forced fumbles, and a fumble recovery as a senior. Trey Edmunds also excelled outside of football, winning the 200-meter dash state title in track and scoring over 1,000 career points for his basketball team. Trey was a 4-star recruit and chose to play football at Virginia Tech over numerous Power 5 offers.

== College career ==
Edmunds attended and played college football at Virginia Tech from 2013 to 2015 and Maryland in 2016. He made his collegiate debut against Alabama and had 20 carries for 132 rushing yards and a rushing touchdown in the loss. In the 2013 season, he had 675 rushing yards and ten rushing touchdowns to go along with 17 receptions for 155 receiving yards and two receiving touchdowns. In the 2014 season, he appeared in five games and had 21 carries for 97 rushing yards. In the 2015 season, he appeared in ten games and had 47 carries for 185 rushing yards and three rushing touchdowns. In the 2016 season, his only with Maryland, he had 26 carries for 158 rushing yards and a rushing touchdown.

=== College statistics ===
Season	Team	GP	Rushing				Receiving			
Season	Team	GP	Att	Yds	Avg	TD	Rec	Yds	Avg	TD
2013	Virginia Tech	12	166	675	4.1	10	17	155	9.1	2
2014	Virginia Tech	5	21	97	4.6	0	2	−5	−2.5	0
2015	Virginia Tech	10	47	185	3.9	3	1	8	8.0	0
2016	Maryland	5	26	158	6.1	1	1	14	14.0	0
Total		32	260	1,115	4.3	14	21	172	8.2	2

== Professional career ==
Pre-draft measurables
Height	Weight	Arm length	Hand span	40-yard dash	10-yard split	20-yard split	Three-cone drill	Vertical jump	Broad jump
6 ft 0 5/8 in (1.84 m)	223 lb (101 kg)	32 3/8 in (0.82 m)	9 3/8 in (0.24 m)	4.48 s	1.58 s	2.58 s	7.25 s	35 1/2 in (0.90 m)	10 ft 2 in (3.10 m)
All values from Pro Day

=== New Orleans Saints ===
Edmunds signed with the New Orleans Saints as an undrafted free agent on May 15, 2017.

On September 11, 2017, in the season opener against the Minnesota Vikings on Monday Night Football, Edmunds had one kickoff return for 22 yards in his NFL debut. On November 12, 2017, he recorded his first career touchdown against the Buffalo Bills, running it in for 41 yards in the 47–10 victory. Overall, in his rookie season, he finished with nine carries for 48 rushing yards and a rushing touchdown.

Edmunds was waived by the Saints on September 3, 2018.

=== Pittsburgh Steelers ===
On September 5, 2018, Edmunds was signed to the Pittsburgh Steelers' practice squad, reuniting him with his brother Terrell. He was promoted to the active roster on December 4, 2018. He appeared in four games and contributed on special teams in the 2018 season.

On August 31, 2019, Edmunds was waived by the Steelers and was signed to the practice squad the next day. He was promoted to the active roster on October 11, 2019. In Week 10 against the Los Angeles Rams, Edmunds recorded an interception off punter Johnny Hekker on a pass attempt during a fake punt in the 17–12 win. In the 2019 season, he recorded 22 carries for 92 rushing yards to go along with six receptions for 48 receiving yards.

On September 5, 2020, Edmunds was waived by the Steelers and signed to the practice squad the next day. He was elevated to the active roster on October 10 and 24 for the team's weeks 5 and 7 games against the Philadelphia Eagles and Tennessee Titans, and reverted to the practice squad after each game. He was signed to the active roster on October 31. He was waived on November 7. On November 10, 2020, Edmunds was re-signed to the active roster. He was placed on injured reserve on November 26, 2020. He was waived on January 12, 2021, and signed a reserve/futures contract with the team on January 15, 2021.

On August 31, 2021, Edmunds was released from the Steelers as part of final roster cuts and re-signed to the practice squad the next day. He signed a reserve/future contract with the Steelers on January 21, 2022. He was released on July 26, 2022.

On November 21, 2023, Edmunds announced his retirement via Instagram.

== Personal life ==
Edmunds' brothers, Terrell and Tremaine, played college football at Virginia Tech. His father, Ferrell Edmunds, was a two-time Pro Bowler, and his younger brothers were the first pair of brothers to ever be drafted in the first round of the same NFL draft.
