= Brian Allen (cornerback) =

American football player (born 1993)

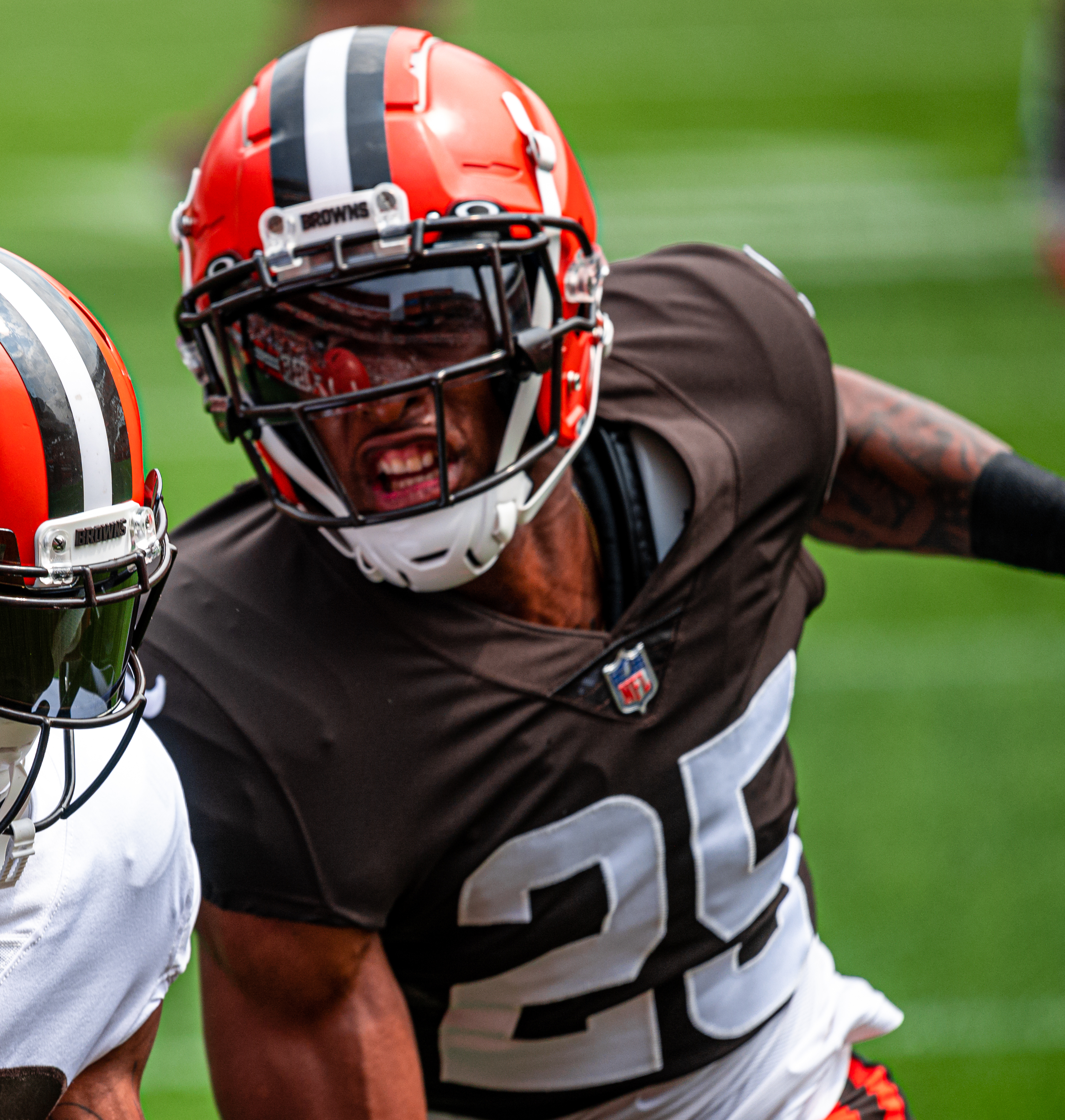
- Allen with the Cleveland Browns in 2021

No. 25
- Position: Cornerback

Personal information
- Born: October 21, 1993 (age 33); La Marque, Texas, U.S.
- Listed height: 6 ft 3 in (1.91 m)
- Listed weight: 210 lb (95 kg)

Career information
- High school: La Marque
- College: Utah (2013-2016)
- NFL draft: 2017: 5th round, 173rd overall pick

Career history
- Pittsburgh Steelers (2017–2018); Seattle Seahawks (2019–2020)*; Buffalo Bills (2020)*; San Francisco 49ers (2020); Cincinnati Bengals (2020)*; Cleveland Browns (2020–2021); Birmingham Stallions (2022); New Orleans Saints (2022)*; Birmingham Stallions (2023)
- * Offseason or practice squad member only

Awards and highlights
- 2× USFL champion (2022, 2023)

Career NFL statistics
- Total tackles: 6
- Stats at Pro Football Reference

Brian Keith Allen (born October 21, 1993) is an American former professional football player who was a cornerback in the National Football League (NFL). He played college football for the Utah Utes. He was selected by the Pittsburgh Steelers in the fifth round of the 2017 NFL draft, and has also spent time with the Seattle Seahawks, Buffalo Bills, San Francisco 49ers, Cincinnati Bengals, Cleveland Browns, Birmingham Stallions and New Orleans Saints.

== Professional career ==
=== Pre-draft ===
Coming out of Utah, the majority of NFL draft experts and scouts projected Allen to be selected in the fifth or sixth round. He received an invitation to the NFL Combine and completed all of the required combine and positional drills. On March 23, 2017, he participated at Utah's pro day and chose to redo the vertical jump, broad jump, and twenty yard shuttle while also doing positional drills. He increased his vertical to 38 inches and was able to decrease his shuttle time. Team representatives and scouts from all 32 NFL teams were in attendance to scout Allen, Garett Bolles, Isaac Asiata, and 20 other prospects.

Pre-draft measurables
Height	Weight	Arm length	Hand span	Wingspan	40-yard dash	10-yard split	20-yard split	20-yard shuttle	Three-cone drill	Vertical jump	Broad jump	Bench press
6 ft 3 1/8 in (1.91 m)	215 lb (98 kg)	34 in (0.86 m)	10 in (0.25 m)	6 ft 6 1/2 in (1.99 m)	4.48 s	1.51 s	2.56 s	4.18 s	6.64 s	38.0 in (0.97 m)	10 ft 7 in (3.23 m)	15 reps
All values from NFL Combine/Pro Day

=== Pittsburgh Steelers ===
The Pittsburgh Steelers selected Allen in the fifth round with the 173rd overall pick in the 2017 NFL draft. On May 8, 2017, the Steelers signed Allen to a four-year, $2.63 million contract with a signing bonus of $230,179.

He entered his first training camp competing with William Gay, Mike Hilton, Greg Ducre, Brandon Dixon, and Senquez Golson for a job to be a backup cornerback. Allen was named the Steelers' fifth cornerback on their depth chart to begin the regular season, behind Artie Burns, Coty Sensabaugh, Hilton, and Gay.

On September 17, 2017, Allen made his professional regular season debut during the Steelers' 26–9 victory over the Minnesota Vikings.

On September 1, 2018, Allen was waived by the Steelers and was signed to the practice squad the next day. He was promoted to the active roster on October 2, 2018.

On August 27, 2019, Allen was placed on injured reserve. He was waived with an injury settlement on August 31, 2019.

=== Seattle Seahawks ===
On October 15, 2019, Allen was signed to the Seattle Seahawks practice squad. He signed a reserve/future contract with the Seahawks on January 14, 2020. He was waived on August 10, 2020.

=== Buffalo Bills ===
Allen signed with the Buffalo Bills on August 28, 2020. He was waived on September 5 as a part of final cuts.

=== San Francisco 49ers ===
On September 16, 2020, Allen was signed to the San Francisco 49ers practice squad. He was elevated to the active roster for the team's week 5 game against the Miami Dolphins, and reverted to the practice squad after the game. He was released on October 27.

=== Cincinnati Bengals ===
On November 3, 2020, Allen was signed to the Cincinnati Bengals practice squad. He was placed on the practice squad/COVID-19 list by the team on November 11, and restored to the practice squad five days later. He was placed back on the practice squad/COVID-19 list on December 21, 2020, and restored to the practice squad again on January 1, 2021.

=== Cleveland Browns ===
Allen was signed to the Cleveland Browns' active roster off the Bengals' practice squad on January 4, 2021. He re-signed with the Browns after the season on March 29, 2021. The Browns terminated Allen's contract on August 31, 2021. He was re-signed to the practice squad on December 16. He was elevated to the active roster for the December 20 game versus the Oakland Raiders.

=== Birmingham Stallions (first stint) ===
Allen was selected by the Birmingham Stallions of the United States Football League (USFL) in the eighth round of the 2022 USFL draft.

=== New Orleans Saints ===
On August 11, 2022, Allen signed with the New Orleans Saints. He was waived on August 28.

=== Birmingham Stallions (second stint) ===
Allen re-signed with the Stallions on January 24, 2023. He was not part of the roster after the 2024 UFL dispersal draft on January 15, 2024.

== Personal life ==
While Allen was in college, he got married and had a daughter. He is the son of Ronald Allen and Niki Jolly. He has three sisters.
