= Mike Hilton =

American football player (born 1994)

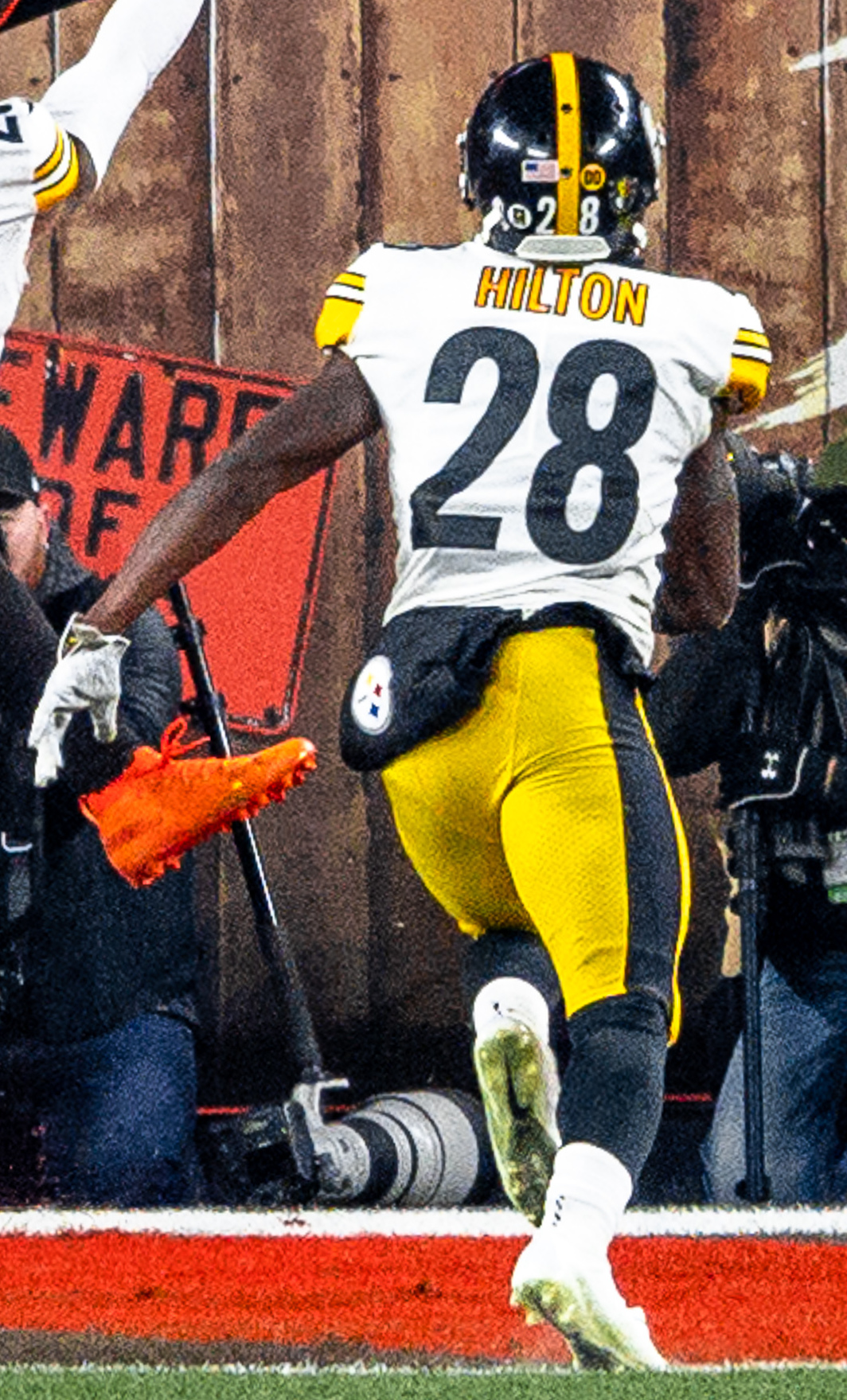
- Hilton with the Pittsburgh Steelers in 2019

Profile
- Position: Cornerback

Personal information
- Born: March 9, 1994 (age 32); Fayetteville, Georgia, U.S.
- Listed height: 5 ft 9 in (1.75 m)
- Listed weight: 184 lb (83 kg)

Career information
- High school: Sandy Creek (Tyrone, Georgia)
- College: Ole Miss (2012–2015)
- NFL draft: 2016: undrafted

Career history
- Jacksonville Jaguars (2016)*; New England Patriots (2016)*; Pittsburgh Steelers (2016–2020); Cincinnati Bengals (2021–2024); Miami Dolphins (2025)*; Indianapolis Colts (2025)
- * Offseason or practice squad member only

Awards and highlights
- Second-team All-SEC (2015)

Career NFL statistics as of 2025
- Total tackles: 525
- Sacks: 11.5
- Forced fumbles: 5
- Fumble recoveries: 6
- Pass deflections: 56
- Interceptions: 13
- Defensive touchdowns: 1
- Stats at Pro Football Reference

Michael Hilton Jr. (born March 9, 1994) is an American professional football cornerback. He played college football for the Ole Miss Rebels and signed with the Jacksonville Jaguars as an undrafted free agent in 2016. He would not see any regular season game action as a member of the Jaguars or subsequently with the New England Patriots, but played regularly with the Pittsburgh Steelers from 2016 to 2020. Hilton signed with the Cincinnati Bengals after the end of his rookie contract, and last played for the Indianapolis Colts in the 2025 regular season.

== College career ==
=== 2012 ===
Hilton began attending the University of Mississippi in 2012. After sitting out the Rebels' season-opener against Central Arkansas, Hilton made his collegiate debut in Week 2 against UTEP. He recorded his first two career tackles the following week as Ole Miss lost to Texas. Hilton made his first career start on October 6, 2012, against Texas A&M, finishing with three solo tackles, a forced fumble, and two sacks of Aggies quarterback Johnny Manziel as the Rebels lost 27–30. In Week 8, he recorded a season-high six combined tackles and had the first two pass deflections of his career, helping the Rebels defeat Arkansas 30–27. He played in 12 games as a freshman, starting four and finishing with 33 combined tackles, 3.5 tackles for a loss, two sacks, two pass deflections, and two forced fumbles.

=== 2013 ===
Hilton started the Ole Miss Rebels' season-opener against Vanderbilt at their "Huskie" position (hybrid strong safety). He finished the 39–35 victory with five total tackles, two of which were for a loss. On October 5, 2013, he collected a season-high eight combined tackles during a 22–30 loss to Auburn. On November 16, 2013, Hilton made his first career interception to go along with four combined tackles as the Rebels defeated Troy 51–21. He finished the season with 52 combined tackles (37 solo), 5.5 tackles for a loss, four pass deflections, a sack, and a forced fumble in 11 games and 11 starts.

=== 2014 ===
In the Ole Miss Rebels' season-opening 35–13 victory over Boise State, Hilton recorded a season-high nine combined tackles. On September 13, 2014, he collected four combined tackles, deflected a pass, and made his first interception of the season in a 56–15 victory over Louisiana-Lafayette. On October 25, 2014, he accumulated eight combined tackles and made his third interception of the season in a 7–10 loss to #24 LSU. Hilton finished his junior season with career-high 71 combined tackles (48 solo), four tackles for a loss, three interceptions, and seven pass deflections in 13 starts and 13 games. He led the team with 71 tackles and started 11 games at cornerback and two games as rover.

=== 2015 ===
As a senior, Hilton was given the #38 jersey This number holds special significance at Ole Miss and is only given to a player who embodies the spirit of former Rebels defensive back Chucky Mullins, who in 1989 became paralyzed after making a head-first tackle that shattered four vertebrae in his cervical spine.

In a 73–22 victory over Fresno State in Week 2, Hilton collected six combined tackles (one for a loss), a forced fumble, and half a sack while starting at rover. On October 10, 2015, he recorded four combined tackles (three for a loss), a pass deflection, and his first interception of the season in a 52–3 victory over New Mexico State. The following week, the Rebels were defeated by Memphis with Hilton making a career-high 11 combined tackles, 2.5 tackles for a loss, one sack, a pass deflection, and an interception. He finished his senior season with 70 combined tackles (49 solo), 12.5 tackles for a loss, 11 pass deflections, 1.5 sacks, and two interceptions in 11 starts and 13 games.

Hilton finished his college career with 226 combined tackles (156 solo), 25.5 tackles for a loss, 24 pass deflections, six interceptions, four forced fumbles, and 3.5 sacks in 49 games and 39 starts.

== Professional career ==
=== Pre-draft ===
Coming out of Ole Miss, Hilton was projected to go undrafted and be a priority free agent by the majority of NFL draft experts and scouts. He did not receive an invitation to the NFL Combine and attended Ole Miss' pro day on March 28, 2016. Team representatives and scouts from all 32 NFL teams were present at Ole Miss' pro day to scout one of the most talented groups in school history, one that included Hilton, Laquon Treadwell, Laremy Tunsil, Robert Nkemdiche, Cody Core, Chad Kelly, Evan Engram, Fahn Cooper and ten other prospects. Hilton was ranked as the 27th-best free safety prospect in the draft by NFLDraftScout.com. He received positive reviews from scouts for his ability to play multiple positions in college, decent coverage skills, gritty tackling ability, reaction quickness, and ability to track balls well downfield. NFL scouts thought his ability to produce a professional career was greatly hindered by his lack of size.

Pre-draft measurables
Height	Weight	Arm length	Hand span	Wingspan	40-yard dash	10-yard split	20-yard split	20-yard shuttle	Three-cone drill	Vertical jump	Broad jump	Bench press
5 ft 8 3/4 in (1.75 m)	178 lb (81 kg)	29 3/4 in (0.76 m)	8 5/8 in (0.22 m)	5 ft 11 1/2 in (1.82 m)	4.55 s	1.59 s	2.67 s	4.19 s	6.86 s	33.5 in (0.85 m)	9 ft 9 in (2.97 m)	13 reps
All values from Ole Miss' Pro Day

=== Jacksonville Jaguars ===
On May 1, 2016, Hilton was signed as an undrafted free agent by the Jacksonville Jaguars following the 2016 NFL draft.

Throughout training camp, Hilton competed with Aaron Colvin, Dwayne Gratz, Peyton Thompson, Josh Johnson, Demetrius McCray, Briean Boddy-Calhoun, and Nick Marshall for a job as a backup cornerback. On August 29, 2016, the Jaguars released Hilton as a part of their final roster cuts.

=== New England Patriots ===
On September 6, 2016, Hilton was signed to the practice squad of the New England Patriots. He was released by the team on September 14, 2016.

=== Pittsburgh Steelers ===
==== 2016 ====
On December 13, 2016, Hilton was signed to the Pittsburgh Steelers' practice squad. Hilton spent the remainder of his rookie season on the Steelers' practice squad and did not appear in any games in 2016. He signed a reserve/future contract with the Steelers on January 24, 2017. He reunited with his former teammate Senquez Golson whom he played with and backed up at Ole Miss.

==== 2017 ====
Hilton entered training camp competing with William Gay and Senquez Golson for the job as the starting nickelback. Hilton was named the starting nickelback to begin the regular season.

External videos
- Mike Hilton records a speedy third sack of the game
- Hilton plucks tipped pass with one handed interception

He made his regular season debut during the Steelers' 18–17 season-opening victory over the Cleveland Browns and finished the game with two combined tackles. The following week, he earned his first career start and recorded a season-high nine combined tackles during a 26–9 victory over the Minnesota Vikings. On October 1, 2017, Hilton collected four solo tackles, earned his first career sack, and made his first career interception off of Baltimore Ravens quarterback Joe Flacco during the Steelers' 26–9 victory. On December 25, 2017, Hilton recorded six solo tackles as well as three sacks on Houston Texans quarterbacks T. J. Yates and Taylor Heinicke during the Steelers' 34–6 victory, earning him American Football Conference (AFC) Defensive Player of the Week honors. Hilton finished the season with 64 combined tackles (48 solo), six pass deflections, four sacks, and two interceptions in 16 games and four starts. Hilton received an overall grade of 83.6 from Pro Football Focus (PFF), which ranked as the 28th-best grade among all cornerbacks in 2017.

==== 2018 ====
External videos
- Mike Hilton recovers ball after Carr’s pass slips

Hilton changed his jersey number from No. 31 to No. 28 after it became available when Sean Davis and Joe Haden also changed numbers. Head coach Mike Tomlin retained Hilton as the primary nickelback to begin the regular season and also named him the fifth backup cornerback, behind Haden, Artie Burns, Coty Sensabaugh, and Cameron Sutton. On September 24, 2018, Hilton made five combined tackles, a pass deflection, and an interception during a 30–27 win at the Tampa Bay Buccaneers. Hilton sustained an elbow injury during the game and was subsequently inactive for the Steelers’ Week 4 loss against the Ravens. In Week 14, he collected a season-high eight combined tackles during a 24–21 loss at the Oakland Raiders. He finished the season with 57 combined tackles (44 solo), eight pass deflections, one sack, and one interception in 15 games and two starts. He received an overall grade of 69.9 from PFF, which ranked as the 43rd-best grade among cornerbacks in 2018.

==== 2019 ====
In Week 5 against the Ravens, Hilton recorded his first interception of the season off Lamar Jackson in the 23–26 overtime loss. In Week 8 against the Miami Dolphins, Hilton forced a fumble on running back Mark Walton which was recovered by teammate Steven Nelson in the 27–14 win. In Week 15 against the Buffalo Bills, Hilton recovered a fumble forced by teammate T. J. Watt on running back Devin Singletary during the 10–17 loss.

==== 2020 ====
On March 18, 2020, the Steelers placed a second-round restricted free agent tender on Hilton. He signed the tender on June 12, 2020.

In Week 2 against the Denver Broncos, Hilton led the team with eight tackles, recorded his first sack of the season on Jeff Driskel, and recovered a fumble during the 26–21 win. In Week 3 against the Texans, Hilton recorded his first interception of the season off a pass thrown by Deshaun Watson during the 28–21 win. In Week 5 against the Philadelphia Eagles, Hilton again led the team with eight tackles and sacked Carson Wentz once during the 38–29 win. In Week 14 against the Bills, Hilton intercepted a pass thrown by Josh Allen and forced a fumble on Dawson Knox that was recovered by the Steelers during the 15–26 loss. In Week 16 against the Indianapolis Colts, Hilton recovered a fumble lost by Philip Rivers and intercepted a pass thrown by Rivers late in the fourth quarter to secure a 28–24 win for the Steelers. Hilton earned the AFC Defensive Player of the Week award for his performance in Week 16.

=== Cincinnati Bengals ===
==== 2021 ====
Hilton signed a four-year, $24 million contract with the Cincinnati Bengals on March 19, 2021. He was named the starting nickel cornerback for the season. In Week 12 against his former team, the Steelers, he returned an interception 24 yards for his first career touchdown in a 41–10 rout. Hilton made a crucial third-quarter interception in the Divisional Round game against the Tennessee Titans, which the Bengals won on their path to Super Bowl LVI, where they lost 23–20 to the Los Angeles Rams.

==== 2022 ====
Hilton returned to his nickelback slot corner role for the Bengals in 2022. He missed the Week 15 game against the Tampa Bay Buccaneers due to a finger injury. In the Wild Card game against the Ravens, he sacked quarterback Tyler Huntley.

=== Miami Dolphins ===
On July 28, 2025, Hilton signed with the Miami Dolphins. He was released on August 25.

=== Indianapolis Colts ===
On September 23, 2025, Hilton was signed to the Indianapolis Colts' practice squad. Hilton was placed on injury reserve following a shoulder injury sustained in a game against the Las Vegas Raiders.

== Career NFL statistics ==
=== Regular season ===
Year	Team	Games		Tackles				Interceptions					Fumbles				
Year	Team	GP	GS	Comb	Solo	Ast	Sck	PD	Int	Yds	Avg	TD	FF	FR	Yds	Avg	TD
2016	PIT	DNP															
2017	PIT	16	4	64	48	16	4.0	6	2	45	22.5	0	1	0	0	0.0	0
2018	PIT	15	2	57	44	13	1.0	8	1	0	0.0	0	0	2	2	1.0	0
2019	PIT	16	8	65	52	13	1.5	11	1	1	1.0	0	1	1	0	0.0	0
2020	PIT	12	6	51	42	9	3.0	7	3	5	2.5	0	1	2	22	11.0	0
2021	CIN	17	9	66	48	18	0.0	5	2	59	29.5	1	1	0	0	0.0	0
2022	CIN	14	4	60	48	12	0.0	6	1	5	5.0	0	0	0	0	0.0	0
2023	CIN	17	13	84	64	20	1.0	8	2	16	8.0	0	0	1	0	0.0	0
2024	CIN	16	10	73	50	23	0.0	5	1	0	0.0	0	0	0	0	0.0	0
2025	IND	2	2	5	4	1	0.0	0	0	0	0.0	0	1	0	0	0.0	0
Total		125	58	525	400	125	11.5	56	13	131	10.1	1	5	6	24	4.0	0

=== Postseason ===
Year	Team	Games		Tackles				Interceptions					Fumbles				
Year	Team	GP	GS	Comb	Solo	Ast	Sck	PD	Int	Yds	Avg	TD	FF	FR	Yds	Avg	TD
2017	PIT	1	0	2	1	1	0.0	0	0	0	0.0	0	0	0	0	0.0	0
2020	PIT	1	0	2	2	0	0.0	0	0	0	0.0	0	0	0	0	0.0	0
2021	CIN	4	3	13	8	5	0.0	4	1	19	19.0	0	0	0	0	0.0	0
2022	CIN	3	1	15	12	3	1.0	2	0	0	0.0	0	0	0	0	0.0	0
Total		9	4	32	23	9	1.0	6	1	19	4.8	0	0	0	0	0.0	0
