= Cameron Sutton =

American football player (born 1995)

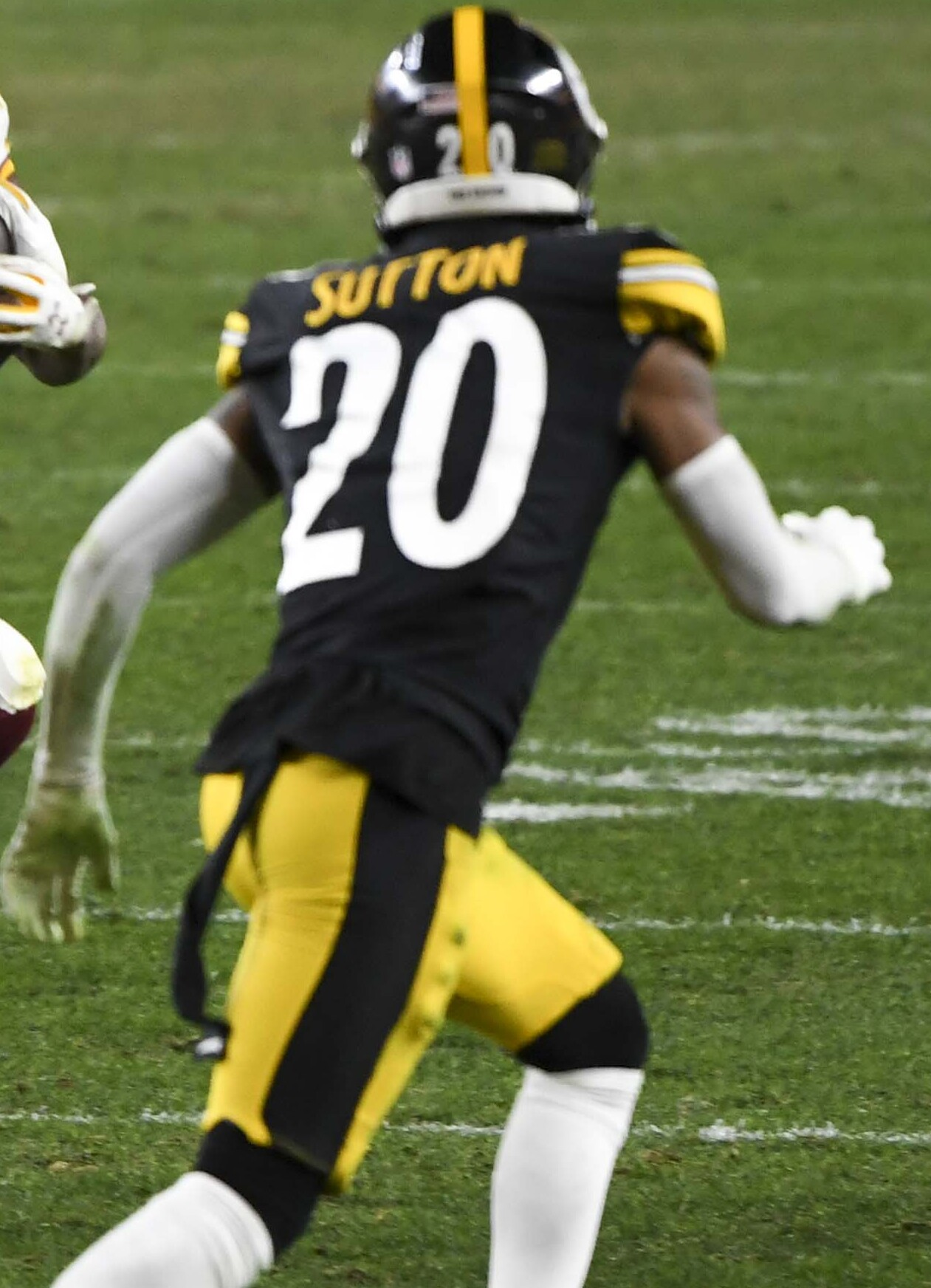
- Sutton with the Pittsburgh Steelers in 2020

No. 34, 20, 1
- Position: Cornerback

Personal information
- Born: February 27, 1995 (age 31); Jonesboro, Georgia, U.S.
- Listed height: 5 ft 11 in (1.80 m)
- Listed weight: 188 lb (85 kg)

Career information
- High school: Jonesboro
- College: Tennessee (2013–2016)
- NFL draft: 2017: 3rd round, 94th overall pick

Career history
- Pittsburgh Steelers (2017–2022); Detroit Lions (2023); Pittsburgh Steelers (2024)

Career NFL statistics
- Total tackles: 248
- Sacks: 2
- Forced fumbles: 6
- Fumble recoveries: 1
- Interceptions: 9
- Stats at Pro Football Reference

Cameron Amir Sutton (born February 27, 1995) is an American former professional football player who was a cornerback in the National Football League (NFL). He played college football for the Tennessee Volunteers, and was selected by the Steelers in the third round of the 2017 NFL draft. He has also played for the Detroit Lions.

== Early life ==
Sutton attended Jonesboro High School in Jonesboro, Georgia. He played cornerback and wide receiver for the Cardinal football team and had 1,396 all-purpose yards and 19 touchdowns as a senior. He also played baseball and basketball in high school. Sutton was rated by Rivals.com as a three-star recruit. He committed to the University of Tennessee to play college football under head coach Butch Jones.

== College career ==
Sutton played at the University of Tennessee from 2013 to 2016. Sutton started in all 12 games as a true freshman in 2013 and recorded 39 tackles, two interceptions, one sack, and a touchdown. He started all 13 games in the 2014 season, recording 37 tackles and three interceptions. In the 2015 season, he played on special teams returning punts and had one interception and two forced fumbles on the year. He fractured his right ankle in a September game against Ohio in the 2016 season. He returned in November. He totaled seven games in the 2016 season.

== Professional career ==
=== Pre-draft ===
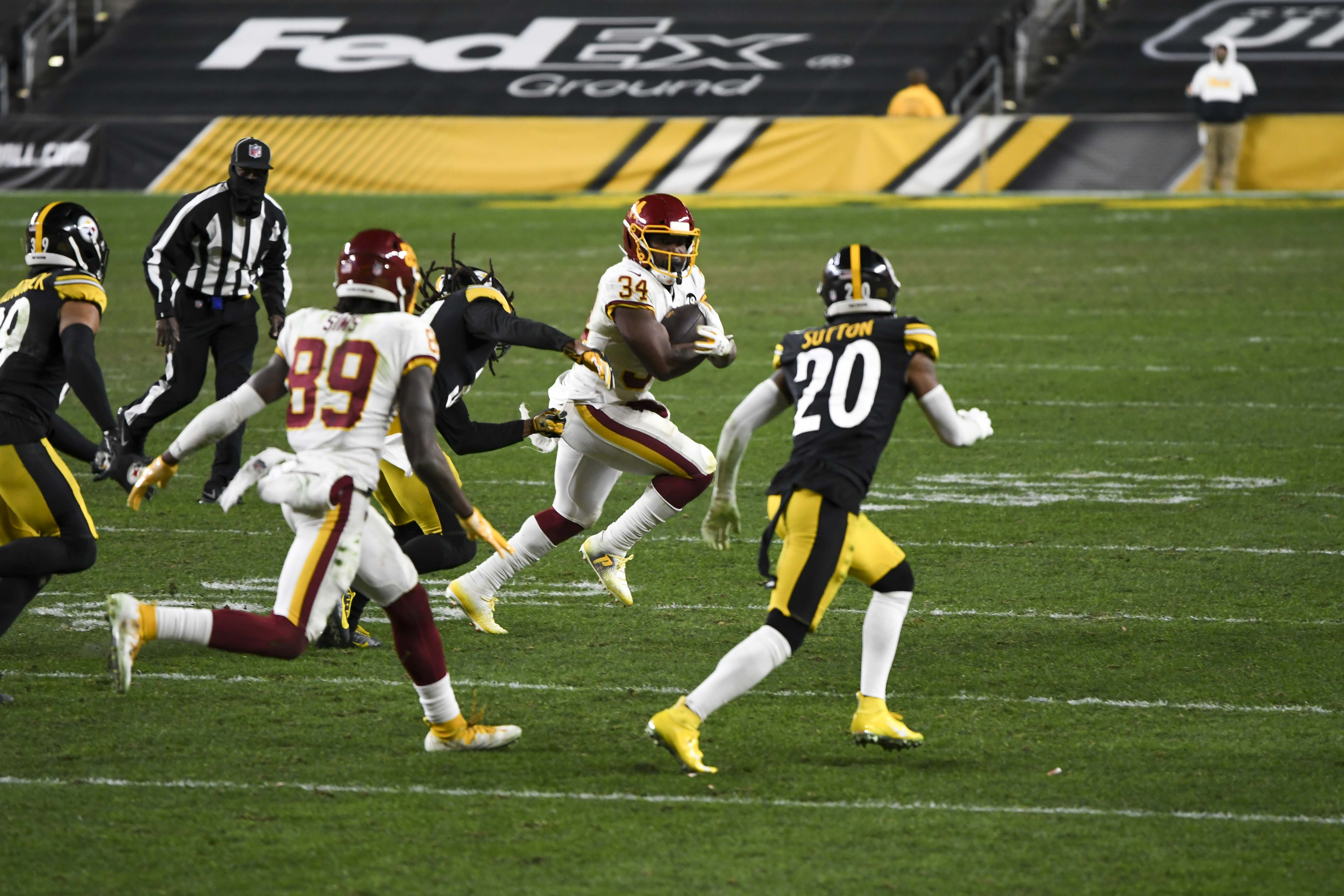
Sutton during a game against Washington in 2020

Sutton received an invitation to the Senior Bowl and raised his draft stock after impressing scouts during practice and showing versatility and willingness for playing both safety and cornerback during the game. He helped the South secure a 16–15 victory over the North and led the team with four combined tackles. He attended the NFL Combine and completed nearly all of the combine drills, but opted to not perform the short shuttle. Sutton also participated in Tennessee's Pro Day and chose to run the short shuttle, three-cone drill, and perform positional drills for representatives and scouts in attendance. The majority of NFL draft experts and analysts projected Sutton to be drafted in the third round. He was ranked the 15th best cornerback in the draft by ESPN and NFLDraftScout.com.

Pre-draft measurables
Height	Weight	Arm length	Hand span	Wingspan	40-yard dash	10-yard split	20-yard split	20-yard shuttle	Three-cone drill	Vertical jump	Broad jump	Bench press
5 ft 11 1/4 in (1.81 m)	188 lb (85 kg)	30 in (0.76 m)	8 1/4 in (0.21 m)	6 ft 1 in (1.85 m)	4.52 s	1.53 s	2.62 s	4.23 s	6.81 s	34 in (0.86 m)	10 ft 0 in (3.05 m)	11 reps
All values from NFL Combine/Pro Day

=== Pittsburgh Steelers (first stint) ===
==== 2017 ====
The Pittsburgh Steelers selected Sutton in the third round (94th overall) of the 2017 NFL draft. The Steelers also drafted his teammate at Tennessee and the Senior Bowl, quarterback Joshua Dobbs. On June 13, 2017, the Steelers signed Sutton to a four-year, $3.21 million contract that includes a signing bonus of $736,128.

He entered training camp competing with William Gay, Coty Sensabaugh, and Mike Hilton for a backup cornerback position. On September 4, 2017, the Steelers placed Sutton on injured reserve after he aggravated a hamstring injury during the Steelers' final preseason game against the Carolina Panthers.

Although Sutton wore jersey No. 20 throughout the preseason, he sold it to Robert Golden after newly acquired free agent Joe Haden bought Golden's No. 21 from him. Sutton opted to wear No. 34 for his rookie season.

On October 31, Sutton returned to practice for the first time since his injury. The Steelers had 21 days to decide whether to activate Sutton or keep him on the injured reserve list for the remainder of the season. On November 21, 2017, the Pittsburgh Steelers activated Sutton off injured reserve. On December 4, 2017, Sutton made his professional regular season debut after he replaced Coty Sensabaugh at left cornerback in the second half against the Cincinnati Bengals. Sensabaugh was pulled after Bengals' receiver A. J. Green made seven catches for 77 yards and two touchdowns in the first half. Sutton held Green to no catches and deflected a pass to help the Steelers overcome a 17-point deficit and defeat the Bengals 23–20. In Week 14, Sutton recorded two solo tackles in a 39–38 victory over the Baltimore Ravens. On December 17, 2017, he earned his first career start in place of Joe Haden, who was still recovering from a fractured fibula sustained in Week 10. In his first start, Sutton recorded a season-high three combined tackles in a 27–24 loss to the New England Patriots. Haden returned the following week and Sutton reverted to a reserve role for the last two games of the regular season. He finished his rookie season with five combined tackles (four solo) and a pass deflection in five games and one start.

==== 2018 ====
During the Week 1 opener at division rival Cleveland. Sutton made his first career interception off a pass by Browns quarterback Tyrod Taylor. In Week 5 against Atlanta, Sutton recorded a season-high five combined tackles in the Steelers' 41–17 blowout victory. A week later against Cincinnati, he made another five tackles and added a pass deflection as the Steelers won 28–21. Sutton's snaps would be diminished until Week 13 in a 17–10 win against the eventual Super Bowl Champion New England Patriots. He finished the 2018 season with 22 total tackles (20 solo), one interception, three passes defended, and one forced fumble.

==== 2019 ====
Sutton's season started very quietly during the Steelers' slide to 1–4. In a Week 6 prime time game against the Los Angeles Chargers, Sutton Intercepted a pass off Philip Rivers and returned it for 26 yards to secure the victory. He finished the game with one interception, three passes defensed, and once tackle, his best performance of the year. During the Steelers' 21–7 loss against the Cleveland Browns in Week 10, Sutton had a sack and returned his first punt of the season for eight yards. He finished the 2019 season with one sack, 16 total tackles (13 solo), one interception, and five passes defended. The Steelers finished the season with an 8–8 record, missing the playoffs for the second consecutive year.

==== 2020 ====
In Week 6 against the Browns, Sutton recorded his first interception of the season off a pass thrown by Baker Mayfield during the 38–7 win. He recorded a sack in the victory as well. He finished the 2020 season with one sack, 30 total tackles (27 solo), one interception, eight passes defended, and three forced fumbles.

==== 2021 ====
On March 20, 2021, the Steelers signed Sutton to a two-year, $9 million contract. In the 2021 season, he appeared in 16 games and 15. He finished with 52 total tackles (44 solo), two interceptions, six passes defended, and one forced fumble.

==== 2022 ====
Sutton appeared in 16 games and started 15 in the 2022 season. He finished with 43 total tackles (35 solo), three interceptions, and 15 passes defended.

=== Detroit Lions ===
On March 16, 2023, Sutton was signed to a three-year, $33 million contract with the Detroit Lions. He started in all 17 regular season games and the three postseason games for the Lions. He had 65 total tackles (50 solo), one interception, six passes defended, and one forced fumble.

Sutton was released by the Lions on March 21, 2024, after an arrest warrant was issued for Sutton in Florida relating to domestic abuse.

=== Pittsburgh Steelers (second stint) ===
On June 5, 2024, Sutton signed a one-year contract to return to the Steelers. On July 8, Sutton was suspended for eight games for violating the personal conduct policy.

== Legal issues ==
On March 7, 2024, an arrest warrant was issued for Sutton following an alleged domestic violence incident. This resulted in the Detroit Lions cutting Sutton on March 21, 2024, after failing to turn himself into the police after two weeks. On March 31, 2024, Sutton turned himself in and was booked into jail. He was charged with misdemeanor battery and entered the batterers' intervention program, a pretrial diversion program, on April 8, 2024.
