= Sean Davis (American football) =

American football player (born 1993)

No. 28, 21, 29, 33, 30
- Position: Safety

Personal information
- Born: October 23, 1993 (age 33); Washington, D.C., U.S.
- Listed height: 6 ft 1 in (1.85 m)
- Listed weight: 202 lb (92 kg)

Career information
- High school: Maret School (Washington, D.C.)
- College: Maryland (2012–2015)
- NFL draft: 2016: 2nd round, 58th overall pick

Career history
- Pittsburgh Steelers (2016–2019); Washington Football Team (2020)*; Pittsburgh Steelers (2020); Indianapolis Colts (2021)*; Cincinnati Bengals (2021)*; New England Patriots (2021); Houston Roughnecks (2023)
- * Offseason or practice squad member only

Career NFL statistics
- Total tackles: 259
- Sacks: 2.5
- Forced fumbles: 1
- Fumble recoveries: 2
- Pass deflections: 21
- Interceptions: 5
- Stats at Pro Football Reference

Sean Eric Davis Jr. (born October 23, 1993) is an American former professional football player who was a safety in the National Football League (NFL). He played college football for the Maryland Terrapins and was selected by the Pittsburgh Steelers in the second round of the 2016 NFL draft. He was also a member of the Washington Football Team, Indianapolis Colts, Cincinnati Bengals, New England Patriots, and Houston Roughnecks.

== Early life ==
Davis attended Maret School in Washington, D.C. As a senior, he recorded 87 tackles and three interceptions on defense and ran for 823 yards, seven rushing touchdowns, 601 receiving yards and five receiving touchdowns on offense. He received offers from North Carolina, Boston College, and Connecticut but ultimately chose to attend the University of Maryland to play football.

== College career ==
Davis played at Maryland from 2012 to 2015. He played safety his first three years before moving to cornerback prior to his senior year. During his career he started 40 of 50 games, recording 319 tackles, five interceptions and 2.5 sacks.

== Professional career ==
=== Pre-draft ===
Pre-draft measurables
Height	Weight	Arm length	Hand span	40-yard dash	20-yard shuttle	Three-cone drill	Vertical jump	Broad jump	Bench press
6 ft 1 in (1.85 m)	201 lb (91 kg)	31 3/8 in (0.80 m)	9 1/2 in (0.24 m)	4.46 s	3.97 s	6.64 s	37.5 in (0.95 m)	10 ft 6 in (3.20 m)	21 reps
All values from NFL Combine

After he performed well at the NFL Combine, many NFL analysts projected Davis to be a second or third round selection in the 2016 NFL draft. Multiple teams and scouts had Davis listed as a safety instead of cornerback because of his size, athleticism, and tendency to give up big plays in coverage. It was reported up to 19 NFL teams were interested in him and he had visits with New England Patriots head coach Bill Belichick and the Tampa Bay Buccaneers. He was invited to the NFL Combine and completed all of the combine and positional drills. Davis was satisfied enough with his combine performance and opted to only participate in positional drills at Maryland's Pro Day.

External videos
- Sean Davis's NFL Combine Workout

=== Pittsburgh Steelers ===
==== 2016 ====
The Pittsburgh Steelers selected Davis in the second round (58th overall) of the 2016 NFL draft. Davis was the third safety drafted in 2016.

External videos
- Steelers draft Sean Davis 58th overall

On May 20, 2016, the Steelers signed Davis to a four-year, $4.08 million contract with a $1.17 million signing bonus and $1.80 million guaranteed. Davis began training camp developing as the Steelers' future strong safety and competed against Robert Golden for the starting role, but was forced to play the nickel position after Senquez Golson suffered a foot injury. He was the best option with fellow rookie Artie Burns also out due to an injury. On September 12, the Steelers started Davis at their nickel back position for the first game of the season against the Washington Redskins. He finished with a total of four tackles in the Steelers' victory and became the first rookie defensive back to start a season opener for the Steelers since Chad Scott in 1997. During a Week 3 loss to the Philadelphia Eagles, he finished with a total of seven combined tackles and also suffered an injury to his back during the game. On October 9, he was again the Steelers' starting nickel back against the New York Jets and would finish the game with four solo tackles and six total. Davis was demoted from the nickelback position in favor for Artie Burns after playing in the slot for the first five games of the season. On November 13, Davis made a critical penalty when he grabbed the face mask of Dallas Cowboys tight end Jason Witten with less than 30 seconds left in the fourth quarter. The 15-yard penalty put the Cowboys, who were down 29–30 at the time, in field goal range and they would score the game-winning touchdown the very next play. He later explained he was attempting to pry the ball but when Witten ducked he accidentally grabbed his facemask. Davis finished the 35–30 loss with a combined five tackles.

The following week, Davis replaced Robert Golden as the Steelers' starting strong safety in a victory over the Cleveland Browns and finished the game with three combined tackles and a pass deflection. Four days later, Davis made his second consecutive start at strong safety against the Indianapolis Colts. Late in the second quarter, Davis saved a go-ahead touchdown after stopping quarterback Scott Tolzien at the one-yard line after he attempted to dive into the end zone. The next play resulted in an incomplete pass on fourth down. The Steelers went on to win the game 28–7, playing every defensive snap, and improved their record to 6–5. The next game, Davis recorded four solo tackles, three assisted tackles, and intercepted his first career pass off of New York Giants quarterback Eli Manning. The Steelers went on to defeat the Giants 24–14. On January 1, 2017, Davis made a season-high eight solo tackles, an assisted tackle, his first career fumble recovery, and sacked Robert Griffin III for the first solo sack of his career in a 27–24 overtime victory over the Cleveland Browns. Davis finished his rookie season with 70 combined tackles, five pass deflections, 1 1/2 sacks, and an interception while starting nine games and playing in all 16 games. On December 29, the Steelers announced that Davis was the winner of their Rookie of the Year award.

The Pittsburgh Steelers finished first in the American Football Conference (AFC) North with an 11–5 record. On January 8, 2017, Davis started his first career playoff game and made four combined tackles in a 30–12 victory over the Miami Dolphins in the AFC wildcard game. The following week, he recorded three tackles in the Steelers' 18–16 win against the Kansas City Chiefs in the AFC Divisional round. He was also fined $24,000 for a helmet-to-helmet hit on Chiefs wide receiver Chris Conley. The Steelers were subsequently eliminated by the eventual Super Bowl LI Champions, the New England Patriots, in the AFC Championship game. Davis made nine combined tackles and a sack on Tom Brady during the 36–17 loss.

==== 2017 ====
During the offseason, Davis had surgery to repair a torn labrum he suffered while making a tackle in a Week 3 loss against the Philadelphia Eagles.

Head coach Mike Tomlin stated Davis would remain the starting strong safety to begin the regular season. He recorded three solo tackles during the Steelers' 21–18 season-opening victory over the Cleveland Browns. On November 16, 2017, Davis made three combined tackles, deflected a pass, and made an interception off of Marcus Mariota during a 40–17 win over the Tennessee Titans. In Week 14, he collected a season-high 12 combined tackles and an interception in the Steelers' 39–38 win against the Baltimore Ravens. On December 31, Davis collected three combined tackles, deflected a pass, and made a sack and interception on quarterback DeShone Kizer in the Steelers' 28–24 victory over Cleveland. He finished the 2017 season with 92 combined tackles (71 solo), eight pass deflections, three interceptions, and a sack across 16 starts.

On January 14, 2018, Davis made 12 combined tackles in a 45–42 loss to the Jacksonville Jaguars in the AFC Divisional round. Pro Football Focus gave Davis an overall grade of 35.5 for the season and his grade ranked 85th among all safeties in 2017.

==== 2018 ====
On March 29, 2018, Davis changed his jersey number from No. 28 to No. 21, reverting to his college number after 21 became available due to Joe Haden changing to No. 23. Throughout training camp, Davis competed to be a starting safety against Morgan Burnett and Terrell Edmunds. Head coach Mike Tomlin named Davis the starting free safety to begin the regular season after the role became vacant after the Steelers released Mike Mitchell. He started alongside Terrell Edmunds for the majority of the 2018 season. On November 4, Davis collected a season-high nine solo tackles during a 23–16 win over the Baltimore Ravens in Week 9. In Week 16, he made five solo tackles, a season-high two pass deflections, and made his only interception of the season during a 31–28 loss at the New Orleans Saints. Davis was inactive for the Steelers' Week 17 win against the Cincinnati Bengals due to a quadriceps injury. He finished the season with 80 combined tackles (59 solo), seven pass deflections, and one interception in 15 games and 15 starts. Davis received an overall grade of 69.8 from Pro Football Focus, which ranked as the 39th best grade among all safeties in 2018.

==== 2019 ====
Davis entered the 2019 season as the Steelers' starting free safety. In Week 2, Davis suffered a shoulder injury and was placed on injured reserve on September 17, 2019.

=== Washington Football Team ===
On March 23, 2020, Davis signed a one-year contract with the Washington Football Team, then known as the Redskins. He was released by Washington on September 5.

=== Pittsburgh Steelers (second stint) ===
On September 6, 2020, Davis signed with the Pittsburgh Steelers.

=== Indianapolis Colts ===
On April 1, 2021, Davis signed a one-year deal with the Indianapolis Colts. He was released on August 31, and was subsequently re-signed to the practice squad the following day. Davis appeared in one regular season game for Indianapolis, and was released on September 14.

=== Cincinnati Bengals ===
On September 15, 2021, Davis was signed to the Cincinnati Bengals' practice squad. He was released by the Bengals on October 5.

=== New England Patriots ===
On October 13, 2021, Davis was signed to the New England Patriots' practice squad. Davis was elevated to the active roster on December 6 for the team's Week 13 matchup against the Buffalo Bills, and reverted to the practice squad after the game.

=== Houston Roughnecks ===
The Houston Roughnecks selected Davis in the fifth round of the 2023 XFL Supplemental Draft on January 1, 2023. He was placed on the reserve list on April 4. The Roughnecks brand was transferred to the Houston Gamblers when the XFL and USFL merged to create the United Football League (UFL).

== Personal life ==
Davis was born to Sean and Lisa Davis and is also trilingual. He speaks English, French, and Chinese and majored in communication during his time at Maryland. On February 26, 2018, it was reported that Davis was named as a defendant in a civil lawsuit for allegedly posting a Snapchat video that led to the bullying of a teen at school. The suit alleges Davis recorded his visit to a Chick-fil-A location in Cranberry, Pennsylvania and made comments about an employee saying, "Chick-fil-A got little kids... This kid like eight-year old. No wonder why the lines be so long at Chick-fil-A." The lawsuit calls Davis' actions "intentional and/or reckless." and "extreme and outrageous" and also includes claims for libel, cyberbullying, intentional infliction of emotional distress and slander. Davis' attorney denied the claims and stated his comments were directed at the chain itself.
