= Senquez Golson =

American football player (born 1993)

No. 21, 27
- Position: Cornerback

Personal information
- Born: July 7, 1993 (age 33); Pascagoula, Mississippi, U.S.
- Listed height: 5 ft 9 in (1.75 m)
- Listed weight: 192 lb (87 kg)

Career information
- High school: Pascagoula
- College: Mississippi
- NFL draft: 2015: 2nd round, 56th overall pick

Career history
- Pittsburgh Steelers (2015–2016); Tampa Bay Buccaneers (2017)*; Oakland Raiders (2018)*
- * Offseason or practice squad member only

Awards and highlights
- Unanimous All-American (2014); First-team All-SEC (2014)
- Stats at Pro Football Reference

Senquez Da'Quinn Golson (born July 7, 1993) is an American former professional football player who was a cornerback in the National Football League (NFL). He played college football for the Ole Miss Rebels, earning unanimous All-American honors in 2014. He was selected by the Pittsburgh Steelers in the second round (56th overall) of the 2015 NFL draft.

He was also a practice squad member of the Tampa Bay Buccaneers and Oakland Raiders. Golson suffered a series of major injuries during the preseason and never appeared in an official NFL game.

== Early life ==
Golson was born on July 7, 1993, in Pascagoula, Mississippi, to Anthony and Tarsha Golson.

Golson attended Pascagoula High School, where he was a letterman in baseball, football and track. In football, he recorded three interceptions and five touchdowns as a senior. He was named a Dandy Dozen selection by The Clarion-Ledger.

In baseball, Golson lettered four years under head coach Richie Tillman. As a senior, he hit for a .345 batting average with three home runs, 25 runs batted in and 16 stolen bases, leading Pascagoula to the second round of the State Playoffs, and was named a first team All-America selection by Rawlings and was an All-Region first team selection for the Southeast. He was selected in the eighth round of the 2011 MLB draft by the Boston Red Sox with the 262nd overall pick, but did not sign.

In track & field, Golson was one of the state's top performers in the 100m. He claimed the state championship in the 100-meter dash for Class 6A in 2011, with a time of 10.66 seconds. He also ran the 200-meter dash, recording a personal-best time of 23.04 seconds.

Considered a three-star recruit by Rivals.com, Golson was ranked as the No. 33 cornerback prospect of his class He committed to Ole Miss on July 21, 2010. and ranked overall 8th in the state of Mississippi.

== College career ==
Despite being drafted by Boston of the MLB, he elected not to sign with the team and decided to return to Ole Miss and fulfill his college commitment. As a freshman, he played in 12 games with four starts at cornerback, recording 16 tackles and an interception. Against Mississippi State he had a season high 8 tackles.

He also played for the Mississippi Diamond Rebels baseball team after his freshman season. At outfield he played in 22 games, starting 15 of them. He batted .204 with, 13 runs scored, 5 stolen bases, and 5 runners batted in.

As a sophomore, he played in 12 games with six starts, finishing with 36 tackles and three interceptions. In a game against #24 Mississippi State he had 3 tackles and 2 interceptions which was a career-high.

As a junior, he played in all 12 games at cornerback, with 10 starts, recording 41 tackles, 2.5 tackles for loss, and two interceptions.

On Sunday, June 22, 2014 at 4:50AM, Golson was arrested in Gautier, Mississippi, for disorderly conduct and failure to comply with an officer for refusing to show a Gautier policeman identification. He was held at the Adult Detention Center in Pascagoula until he posted $1,000 bail.

As a senior, he emerged as one of the best defensive players in the Southeastern Conference (SEC). In a game against #1 Alabama, he made an interception in the back of the end zone sealing the victory and upset for the Rebels. He was named a first-team All-SEC selection and earned unanimous All-American honors, the first in school history since Michael Oher in 2008. During his senior season, he started all 12 regular season games plus the 2015 Peach Bowl. He accumulated 43 tackles, three of them for a loss. He also tied the school record with 10 interceptions in a season, with one of them occurring in the 2015 Peach bowl. Golson also scored his only career touchdown and had 162 interception return yards during his senior season. For his career he had a total of 136 tackles, 6 tackles for a loss, 16 interceptions, and 1 touchdown.

== Professional career ==
Pre-draft measurables
Height	Weight	Arm length	Hand span	40-yard dash	20-yard shuttle	Three-cone drill	Vertical jump	Broad jump	Bench press
5 ft 9 in (1.75 m)	176 lb (80 kg)	29 3/4 in (0.76 m)	9 3/8 in (0.24 m)	4.46 s	4.20 s	6.81 s	33.5 in (0.85 m)	10 ft 0 in (3.05 m)	15 reps
All values from NFL Combine

=== Pittsburgh Steelers ===
==== 2015 season ====
Golson was drafted by the Pittsburgh Steelers in the second round, 56th overall, of the 2015 NFL draft. On May 12, 2015, he signed a four-year rookie contract worth $4 million with $2.2 million guaranteed.

On August 21, 2015, Steelers head coach Mike Tomlin announced that Golson underwent surgery on his shoulder that would likely keep him out for his entire rookie season. He was placed on injured reserve on August 31, 2015. The surgery was season-ending as Golson did not play during the entire 2015 season.

==== 2016 season ====
The Steelers gave Golson competition at cornerback when they selected Artie Burns with their first-round pick in the 2016 NFL draft.

On August 1, 2016, Golson suffered a mid-foot injury during practice. The next day it was determined that the foot suffered a Lisfranc injury and, on August 8, he underwent Lisfranc surgery. Both the Steelers and Golson were hoping for a return to practice within about 7 or 8 weeks. However, on October 8, 2016, Golson was placed on injured reserve, and missed the entire 2016 season.

==== 2017 season ====
The Steelers signed veteran cornerback Coty Sensabaugh and drafted Cameron Sutton and Brian Allen with their third and fifth-round picks respectively in the 2017 NFL draft, giving Golson ample competition for a roster spot after missing the previous two seasons with injuries. On July 30, Golson was carted off the field on the first day of padded practice for the third season in a row. As a consequence of his injury, he did not play in any of the Steelers' four preseason games. As a result, Golson was waived by the Steelers on September 2, 2017.

=== Tampa Bay Buccaneers ===
On November 15, 2017, Golson was signed to the practice squad of the Tampa Bay Buccaneers, but was released a week later.

=== Oakland Raiders ===
On April 6, 2018, Golson signed with the Oakland Raiders. He was released on May 23, 2018.
