= Coty Sensabaugh =

American football player (born 1988)

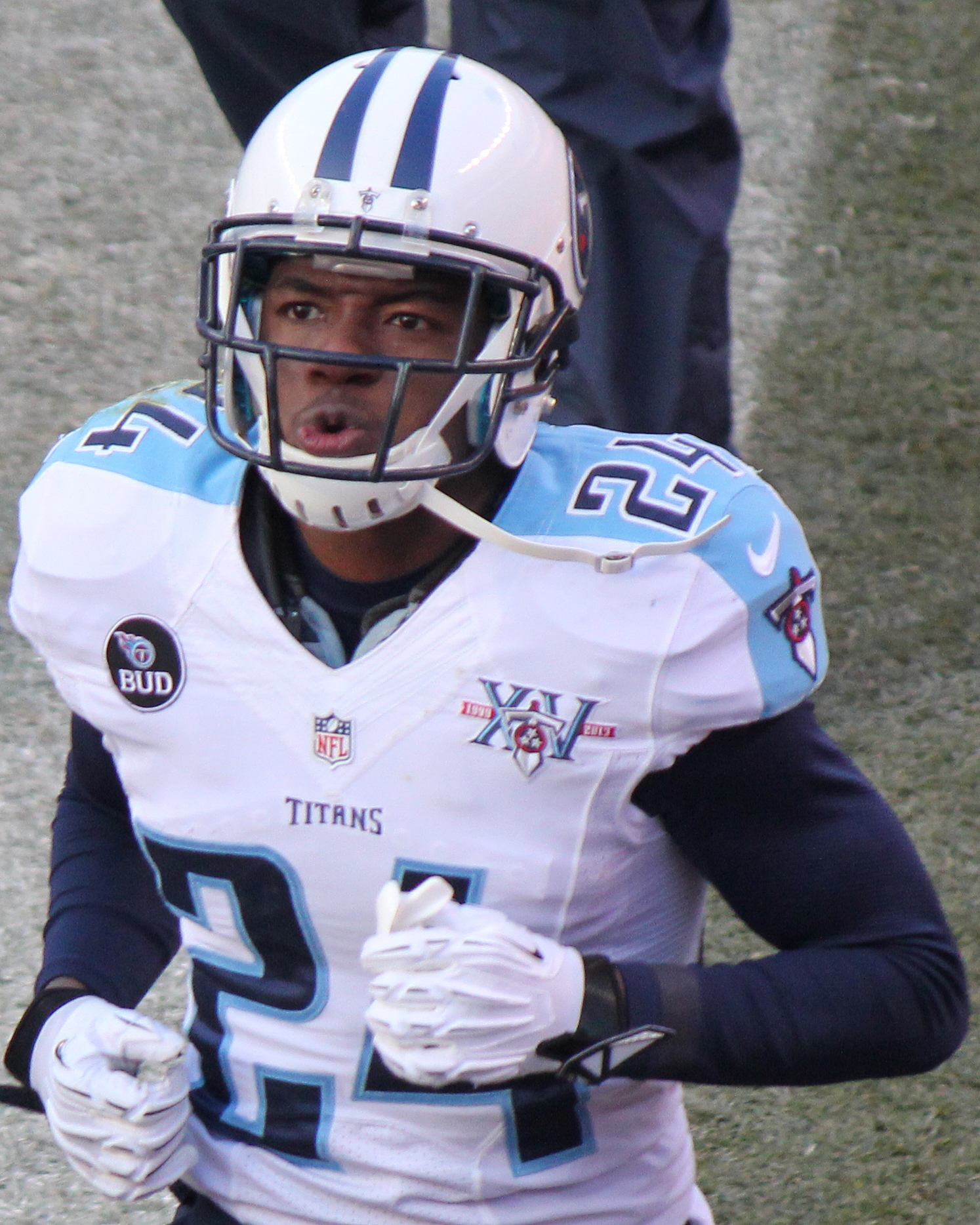
- Sensabaugh with the Tennessee Titans in 2013

No. 24, 21, 30, 37
- Position: Cornerback

Personal information
- Born: November 15, 1988 (age 37); Kingsport, Tennessee, U.S.
- Listed height: 5 ft 11 in (1.80 m)
- Listed weight: 187 lb (85 kg)

Career information
- High school: Dobyns-Bennett (Kingsport)
- College: Clemson (2007–2011)
- NFL draft: 2012: 4th round, 115th overall pick

Career history
- Tennessee Titans (2012–2015); Los Angeles Rams (2016); New York Giants (2016); Pittsburgh Steelers (2017–2018); Denver Broncos (2019); Washington Redskins (2019)

Career NFL statistics
- Total tackles: 272
- Sacks: 1
- Forced fumbles: 2
- Fumble recoveries: 3
- Pass deflections: 32
- Interceptions: 3
- Defensive touchdowns: 1
- Stats at Pro Football Reference

Coty Alexander Sensabaugh (born November 15, 1988) is an American former professional football player who was a cornerback in the National Football League (NFL). He played college football for the Clemson Tigers and was selected by the Tennessee Titans in the fourth round of the 2012 NFL draft.

== College career ==
Sensabaugh played college football as a defensive back at Clemson University. He redshirted as a freshman in 2007. In 2008 and 2009, Sensabaugh played on special teams and as a backup cornerback, recording one interception each in his redshirt freshman and redshirt sophomore seasons. As a redshirt junior in 2010, he played in 13 games with 3 starts, recording 28 tackles, two pass deflections, and one interception. Sensabaugh broke out as a redshirt senior in 2011, starting all 14 games at cornerback, recording 40 tackles, one interception, and 13 pass deflections. In his Clemson career, Sensabaugh played in 52 games with 17 starts, recording 87 tackles and four interceptions.

== Professional career ==
=== Pre-draft ===
Coming out of Clemson, Sensabaugh received an invitation to the annual NFL Combine in Indianapolis. He attended the combine, completed all of the required combine drills, and finished third among all defensive backs in the 40-yard dash. On March 8, 2012, he opted to participate at Clemson's pro day, along with Brandon Thompson, Dwayne Allen, Andre Branch, Antoine McClain, Kourtnei Brown, and others. Sensabaugh chose to stand on his combine numbers and only perform positional drills for the team representatives and scouts in attendance. After his pre-draft process was complete, he received a sixth round draft projection from NFL draft experts and analysts. He was ranked the 26th best cornerback prospect in the draft by NFLDraftScout.com.

Pre-draft measurables
Height	Weight	Arm length	Hand span	40-yard dash	10-yard split	20-yard shuttle	Three-cone drill	Vertical jump	Broad jump	Bench press	Wonderlic
5 ft 11 in (1.80 m)	189 lb (86 kg)	31 in (0.79 m)	9 in (0.23 m)	4.42 s	1.60 s	4.06 s	6.60 s	37 in (0.94 m)	10 ft 2 in (3.10 m)	15 reps	27
All values from NFL Combine

=== Tennessee Titans ===
==== 2012 ====
The Tennessee Titans selected Sensabaugh in the fourth round (115th overall) in the 2012 NFL draft.

On May 11, 2012, the Titans signed Sensabaugh to a four-year, $2.5 million contract.

Sensabaugh entered training camp his rookie year competing with Tommie Campbell, Chris Hawkins, Ryan Mouton, and Terrence Wheatley to be the Tennessee Titans' third cornerback on their depth chart. Head coach Mike Munchak named Sensabaugh the fifth cornerback on the depth chart to begin the season, behind Jason McCourty, Alterraun Verner, Tommie Campbell, and Ryan Mouton. His defensive backs coach with the Titans was Brett Maxie, who was also his cousin Gerald's coach with the New York Jets.

He made his professional regular-season debut in the Tennessee Titans' season-opening 13–34 loss to the New England Patriots. The following week, Sensabaugh recorded two combined tackles during a 10–38 loss at the San Diego Chargers in Week 2. On November 4, 2012, Sensabaugh received his first career start and collected four combined tackle as the Titans lost to the Chicago Bears, 20–51. He finished his rookie season with a total of 31 combined tackles (22 solo) and three pass deflections in three starts and 16 games.

==== 2013 ====
Sensabaugh competed with Blidi Wreh-Wilson and Tommie Campbell for the Tennessee Titans' position as the third cornerback. After showing promise throughout training camp, he was named the third cornerback on the depth chart to begin the regular season. During the Titans' 16–9 season-opening victory over the Pittsburgh Steelers, Sensabaugh recorded a season-high five solo tackles and deflected a pass. The next week, he earned his first start of the season and recorded two combined tackles as the Titans lost, 24–30, to the Houston Texans.

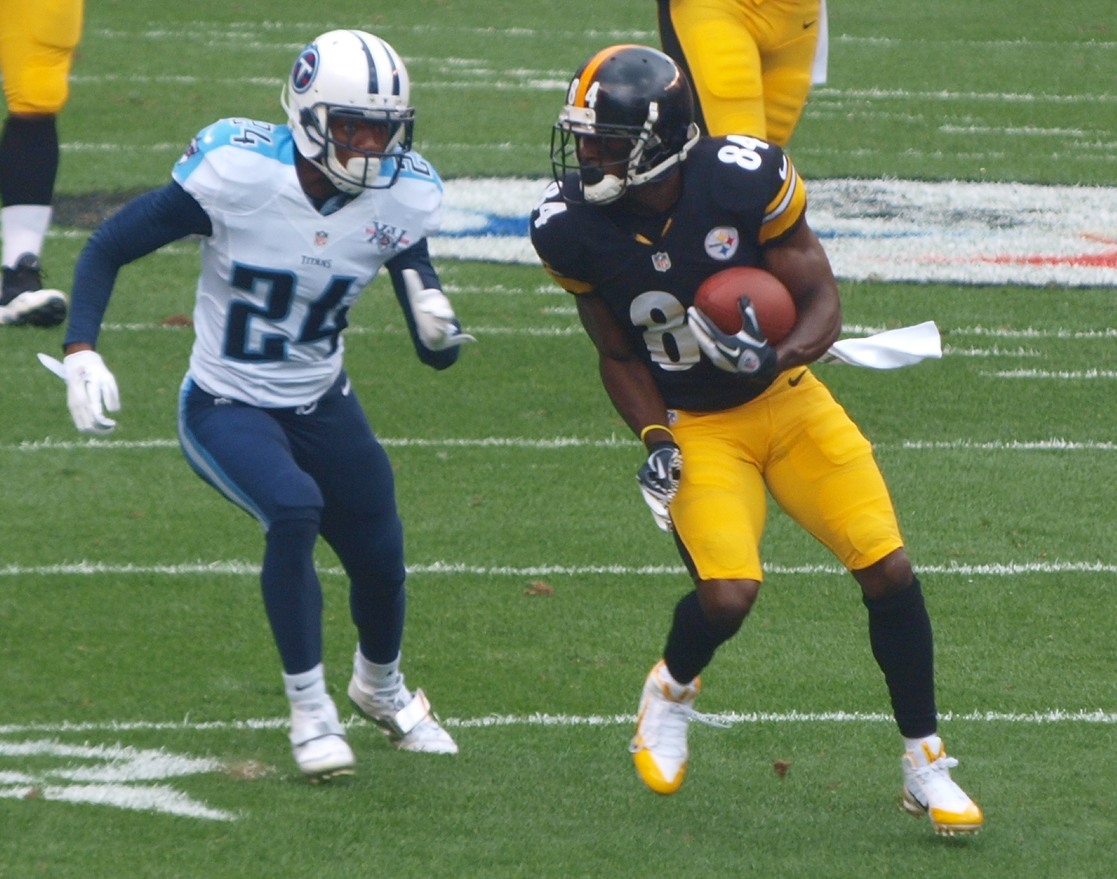
Sensabaugh pursuing Antonio Brown of the Pittsburgh Steelers in 2013

On December 18, 2013, the Titans placed Sensabaugh on injured reserve due to a foot injury. He finished the 2013 season with a total of 32 combined tackles (26 solo) and six pass deflections while starting three games and appearing in 14.

==== 2014 ====
Sensabaugh entered training camp in 2014 competing to be the starting cornerback opposite Jason McCourty after Alterraun Verner left via free agency. He lost the job to Blidi Wreh-Wilson and was named the third corner on the depth chart ahead of Brandon Harris and Marqueston Huff.

During the Tennessee Titans' season-opening 26–10 victory over the Kansas City Chiefs, he recorded a solo tackle and made his first career sack on Chiefs' quarterback Alex Smith. The following game, he earned his first start of the season and collected four solo tackles during a 10–26 loss to the Dallas Cowboys. On September 28, 2014, Sensabaugh recorded a season-high six solo tackles and a pass deflection as the Titans lost 17–41 to the Indianapolis Colts. He suffered a knee injury and was inactive for three games (Weeks 6–8) of the season. He finished the 2014 season with a total of 47 combined tackles (39 solo), a pass defection, and one sack in 13 games and six starts.

==== 2015 ====
Head coach Ken Whisenhunt held an open competition to name a new starting cornerback to start alongside Jason McCourty. The competition was between newcomer Perrish Cox, Blidi Wreh-Wilson, Jemea Thomas, and Sensabaugh. Although Perrish Cox was named the starting cornerback alongside Jason McCourty, Sensabaugh was able to win the starting nickel back job over Blidi Wreh-Wilson.

Sensabaugh started the Tennessee Titans season-opening 42–14 victory over the Tampa Bay Buccaneers and finished with a pass deflection and intercepted Jameis Winston's first career pass attempt, returning it for a 26-yard touchdown. This marked Sensabaugh's first career interception and first career touchdown. On October 18, 2015, he recorded three combined tackles and picked off Dolphin's quarterback Ryan Tannehill for his second interception of the season, as the Titans defeated the Dolphins 38–10. With the expanded playing time as a starter, 2015 marked Sensabaugh's best year as a pro, finishing the season with a career-high 60 combined tackles (44 solo), a career-high eight pass deflections, and a career-high two interceptions in 15 starts and 16 games.

=== Los Angeles Rams ===
On March 14, 2016, the Los Angeles Rams signed him to a three-year, $15 million contract with $6.5 million guaranteed.

Sensabaugh was brought into the Rams organization to compete for the vacant starting cornerback position left by the departure of Janoris Jenkins. He competed with E. J. Gaines, Lamarcus Joyner, and Marcus Roberson for the starting position. Head coach Jeff Fisher named Sensabaugh the starting corner, opposite Trumaine Johnson to begin the regular season. He made his Los Angeles Ram's debut in their season-opening 0–28 loss at the San Francisco 49ers and accumulated a career-high nine solo tackles and forced the first fumble of his career. The following week, Sensabaugh was benched in favor of Troy Hill during a 9–3 victory over the Seattle Seahawks. With Trumaine Johnson solidified as the top cornerback, the return of E.J. Gaines, and Lamarcus Joyner playing as their starting nickel back, Sensabaugh was inactive for a Week 4 victory over the Arizona Cardinals.

On October 8, 2016, he was cut by the Rams. During his short stint with the Rams, Sensabaugh earned $4.5 million for playing in three games. The Rams decided to cut him after it became apparent that there was no longer a role for him in their secondary.

=== New York Giants ===
On October 11, 2016, Sensabaugh was signed by the New York Giants.

Sensabaugh joined a deep position group on the New York Giants and was initially sixth on the depth chart, behind Janoris Jenkins, Dominique Rodgers-Cromartie, Eli Apple, Trevin Wade, and Leon Hall. On October 16, 2016, he made his New York Giants debut and made one tackle during a 27–23 victory over the Baltimore Ravens. He finished the 2016 with 25 combined tackles (22 solo) in 13 games and two starts.

The New York Giants finished with an 11–5 record and received a playoff berth. On January 8, 2017, Sensabaugh played in his first career playoff game and recorded six combined tackles, a pass deflection, and sacked Aaron Rodgers as the Giants were defeated by the Green Bay Packers 38–13 in the NFC Wildcard game.

=== Pittsburgh Steelers ===
On March 20, 2017, the Pittsburgh Steelers signed Sensabaugh to a two-year, $2.6 million contract with a $425,000 signing bonus. He reunited with his former head coach at Tennessee, Mike Munchak, who was the Pittsburgh Steelers' offensive line coach.

Sensabaugh was impressive throughout training camp and was named the fifth cornerback on the depth chart, behind Joe Haden, Artie Burns, Mike Hilton, and William Gay. He made his Steelers debut in their 21–18 season-opening victory over the Cleveland Browns. During a Week 3 overtime loss to the Chicago Bears, Sensabaugh recorded his first tackle as a member of the Steelers.

During a Week 11 matchup against Indianapolis Colts, Sensabaugh recorded three solo tackles after replacing Haden, who had left the Steelers' 20–17 victory with an apparent leg injury. It was later discovered that Haden had suffered a fractured fibula and would miss several games.

On November 16, 2017, Sensabaugh earned his first start as a member of the Steelers and made three combined tackles, deflected a pass, and intercepted a pass by Marcus Mariota, returning it for 32 yards. The Steelers went on to defeat Sensabaugh's former team, the Titans, 40–17 on Thursday Night Football. He finished the season playing in 14 games with four starts, recording 22 tackles, three passes defensed and one interception.

=== Denver Broncos ===
On October 8, 2019, Sensabaugh signed with the Denver Broncos. On November 13, Sensabaugh was waived by the Broncos.

=== Washington Redskins ===
The Washington Redskins signed Sensabaugh on December 17, 2019. He was released by the Redskins on March 23, 2020.

== NFL career statistics ==
Legend
**Bold**	Career high

=== Regular season ===
Year	Team	Games		Tackles					Interceptions					Fumbles			
Year	Team	GP	GS	Cmb	Solo	Ast	Sck	TFL	Int	Yds	TD	Lng	PD	FF	FR	Yds	TD
2012	TEN	**16**	3	31	22	9	0.0	0	0	0	0	0	2	0	0	0	0
2013	TEN	14	3	31	26	5	0.0	**1**	0	0	0	0	7	0	**2**	0	0
2014	TEN	13	6	47	39	8	**1.0**	**1**	0	0	0	0	6	0	1	0	0
2015	TEN	**16**	**15**	**60**	**44**	**16**	0.0	0	**2**	**42**	**1**	26	**8**	0	0	0	0
2016	LAR	3	2	10	10	0	0.0	**1**	0	0	0	0	0	**1**	0	0	0
2016	NYG	10	0	15	12	3	0.0	**1**	0	0	0	0	0	0	0	0	0
2017	PIT	14	4	22	19	3	0.0	0	1	32	0	**32**	3	0	0	0	0
2018	PIT	15	10	45	40	5	0.0	**1**	0	0	0	0	6	**1**	0	0	0
2019	DEN	4	0	2	1	1	0.0	0	0	0	0	0	0	0	0	0	0
2019	WAS	2	2	9	7	2	0.0	**1**	0	0	0	0	0	0	0	0	0
		107	45	272	220	52	1.0	6	3	74	1	32	32	2	3	0	0

=== Playoffs ===
Year	Team	Games		Tackles					Interceptions					Fumbles			
Year	Team	GP	GS	Cmb	Solo	Ast	Sck	TFL	Int	Yds	TD	Lng	PD	FF	FR	Yds	TD
2016	NYG	**1**	0	**6**	**5**	**1**	**1.0**	**1**	0	0	0	0	**1**	0	0	0	0
		1	0	6	5	1	1.0	1	0	0	0	0	1	0	0	0	0

== Personal life ==
Sensabaugh was born and raised in Kingsport, Tennessee by his parents, Becky and Kim Sensabaugh. He has two older brothers named Jamaar and Travis. In 2000, Jamaar, who was 16 at the time, was hospitalized after complaining about feeling lethargic. He was diagnosed with leukemia and died a few days later. His cousin, Gerald Sensabaugh, is a retired NFL safety, who played for the Jacksonville Jaguars and Dallas Cowboys from 2005 to 2012.

In July 2016, Sensabaugh married his longtime girlfriend Dominique, whom he had met at Clemson. They had their ceremony in Atlanta, Georgia and decided to forgo their honeymoon and instead go to Puerto Plata, Dominican Republic and hand out shoes to people in need. In lieu of wedding gifts, the couple instead asked for donations. They worked with Soles4Souls a charity that works in getting shoes for the less fortunate.

Every summer, the couple also sponsors a youth football camp, headed by Coty, named the Sensabaugh Camp Classic. The camp is free of charge and is for youths from 6–17 and is held at J. Fred Johnson stadium in Sensabaugh's hometown of Kingsport. The camp has held its fifth season as of June 2017 and volunteers that attend include his cousin Gerald Sensabaugh and Free agent safety Marcus Gilchrist, who Sensabaugh was teammates with at Clemson.
