= Robert Golden =

American football player (born 1990)

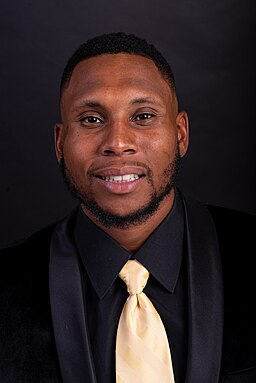

No. 21, 20, 22
- Position: Safety

Personal information
- Born: September 13, 1990 (age 36); Fresno, California, U.S.
- Listed height: 5 ft 11 in (1.80 m)
- Listed weight: 202 lb (92 kg)

Career information
- High school: Edison (Fresno)
- College: Arizona
- NFL draft: 2012: undrafted

Career history
- Pittsburgh Steelers (2012–2017); Kansas City Chiefs (2018)*
- * Offseason or practice squad member only

Career NFL statistics
- Total tackles: 125
- Forced fumbles: 2
- Fumble recoveries: 2
- Pass deflections: 7
- Interceptions: 2
- Defensive touchdowns: 1
- Stats at Pro Football Reference

Robert Golden (born September 13, 1990) is an American former professional football player who was a safety in the National Football League (NFL). He played college football for the Arizona Wildcats and was signed by the Pittsburgh Steelers as an undrafted free agent in 2012. He is the founder of Golden Charter Academy.

== Early life ==
Golden attended Edison High School in Fresno, California. He was named to the Tacoma News Tribune Western 100. He was selected to the 2007 PrepStar Dream Team. He was selected to the Second-team all-state by CalHiSports and was named to the All-Valley first-team. He was selected to the MaxPreps Division II All-State first team. He participated in the U.S. Army All-American game.

== College career ==
As a four-star recruit, Golden received multiple offers including UCLA, USC, Oregon State, and Oregon. He decided to begin attending Arizona in 2008. Golden began his first two seasons as a cornerback and was thought to be the heir-apparent to Antoine Cason. In the 2008 season, he recorded 13 total tackles and a forced fumble. In the 2009 season, he recorded 41 total tackles, two interceptions, one pick six (against Stanford), and three passes defensed. Following his sophomore season though, head coach Mike Stoops switched Golden to strong safety. In the 2010 season, he recorded 60 total tackles, one interception, 13 passes defensed, and one forced fumble. In the 2011 season, he recorded 69 total tackles, one pick six (against Washington), six passes defensed, and two forced fumbles.

== Professional career ==
=== Pre-draft ===
Golden entered the 2012 NFL draft after graduating from Arizona. Although he attended the NFL combine and worked out at Arizona's Pro Day, he went undrafted.

Pre-draft measurables
Height	Weight	40-yard dash	10-yard split	20-yard split	20-yard shuttle	Three-cone drill	Vertical jump	Broad jump	Bench press
5 ft 11 in (1.80 m)	201 lb (91 kg)	4.51 s	1.58 s	2.64 s	4.40 s	7.04 s	37 1/2 in (0.95 m)	9 ft 5 in (2.87 m)	19 reps
All values from Arizona Pro Day

=== Pittsburgh Steelers ===
==== 2012 ====
On April 29, 2012, Golden was signed as an undrafted free agent by the Pittsburgh Steelers. His contract was for three-years, $1.44 million, a $5,000 signing bonus, and $5,000 guaranteed.

Golden played in his first career game against the Denver Broncos, in the season opener his rookie season. On October 11, 2012, he made his first career tackle in a 23–26 loss to the Tennessee Titans. He finished his first year playing in 15 games and made 6 tackles as a back-up free safety behind long-time Steelers veteran Ryan Clark.

==== 2013 ====
The following year, he began the season opener making two solo tackles against the Tennessee Titans. On November 10, 2013, Golden made a season-high 3 tackles in a victory over the Buffalo Bills. In Week 8, he caused his first career forced fumble in an 18–21 loss to the Oakland Raiders. During his second year he played in all 16 games and recorded 14 total tackles as the Steelers finished 8–8 for the second consecutive season.

==== 2014 ====
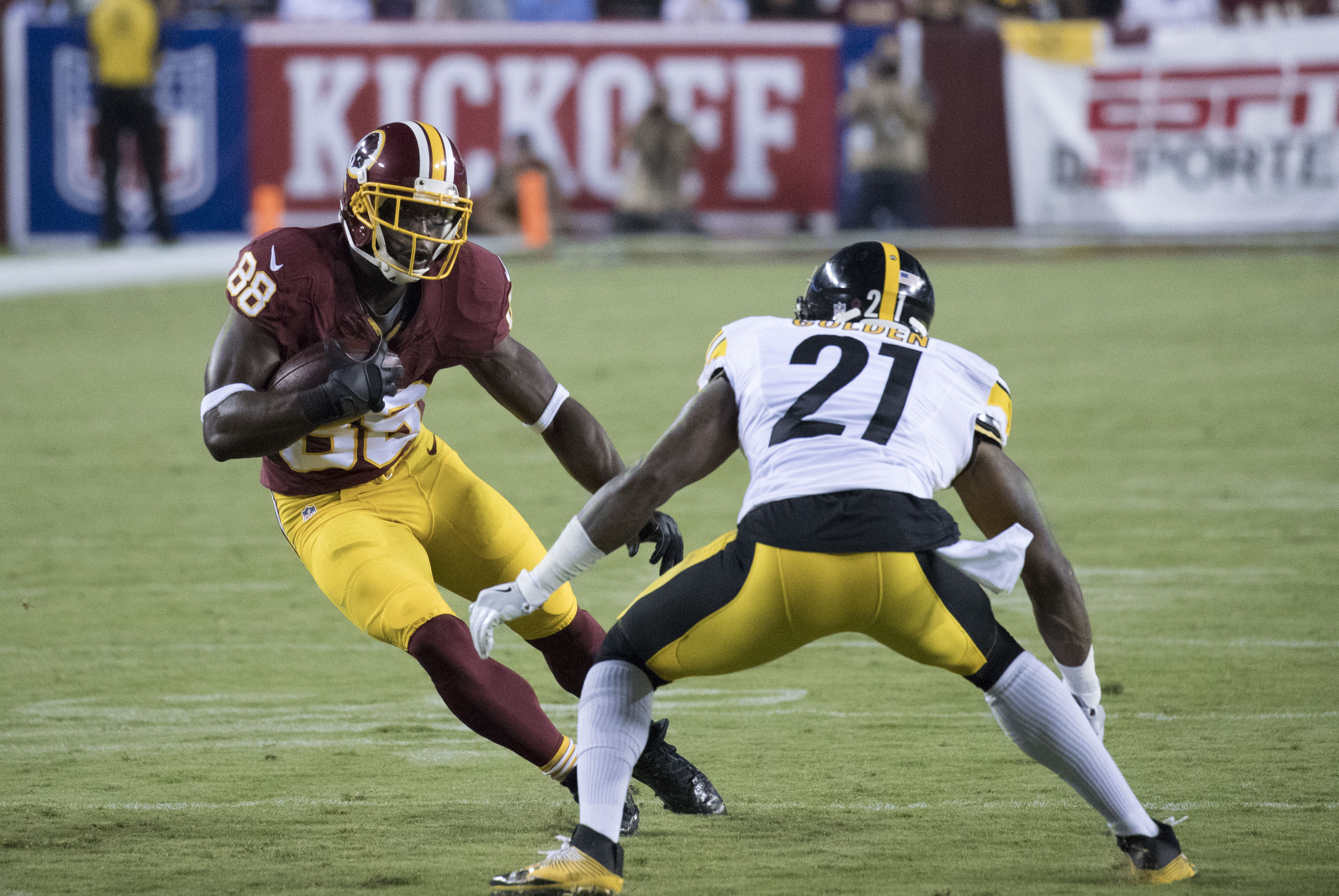
Golden and Pierre Garçon in 2016

He opened the 2014 season as a back-up to new free safety Will Allen, after Clark's departure during the off-season. In the season opener against the Cleveland Browns, he completed a 25-yard pass to Antwon Blake in the fourth quarter. Golden also played in his first career playoff game during the Steelers' 17–30 loss to the Ravens in the wild card game. He finished his season playing in all regular season games and finished with 10 tackles, with 5 being solo.

==== 2015 ====
On March 9, 2015, he was signed as a restricted free-agent to a one-year deal worth $1.54 million. On October 18, 2015, he received his first career start after Will Allen was injured the previous game. He ended the game with a career-high 8 total tackles and a pass deflection. He also received the next two starts in place of Allen. During a Week 14 victory over the Cincinnati Bengals, he made his first career interception and returned it for 27 yards.

==== 2016 ====
On March 7, 2016, the Pittsburgh Steelers signed Golden to a three-year, $4.95 million contract with a signing bonus of $1.25 million.

Golden began the 2016 regular season as the Steelers' starting strong safety after they chose to not resign Will Allen during the off-season. On September 18, 2016, Golden made a career-high nine combined tackles and a pass deflection during a 24–16 victory over the Cincinnati Bengals He started the first nine games of the season but began rotating with rookie Sean Davis against the Baltimore Ravens in Week 9. By Week 11, he had been benched in favor of the rookie Davis during the Steeler's victory over the Cleveland Browns. He was also benched the following game against the Indianapolis Colts.

==== 2017 ====
Golden started the regular season as the backup strong safety to Sean Davis. In Week 7, against the Cincinnati Bengals, he completed a 44-yard pass to Darrius Heyward-Bey on a fake punt. Overall, in the 2017 season, Golden recorded 15 total tackles, two passes defensed, and an interception.

On March 14, 2018, Golden was released by the Steelers.

=== Kansas City Chiefs ===
On April 3, 2018, Golden signed with the Kansas City Chiefs. He was released on August 15, 2018, at his request.
