= Joe Haden =

American football player (born 1989)

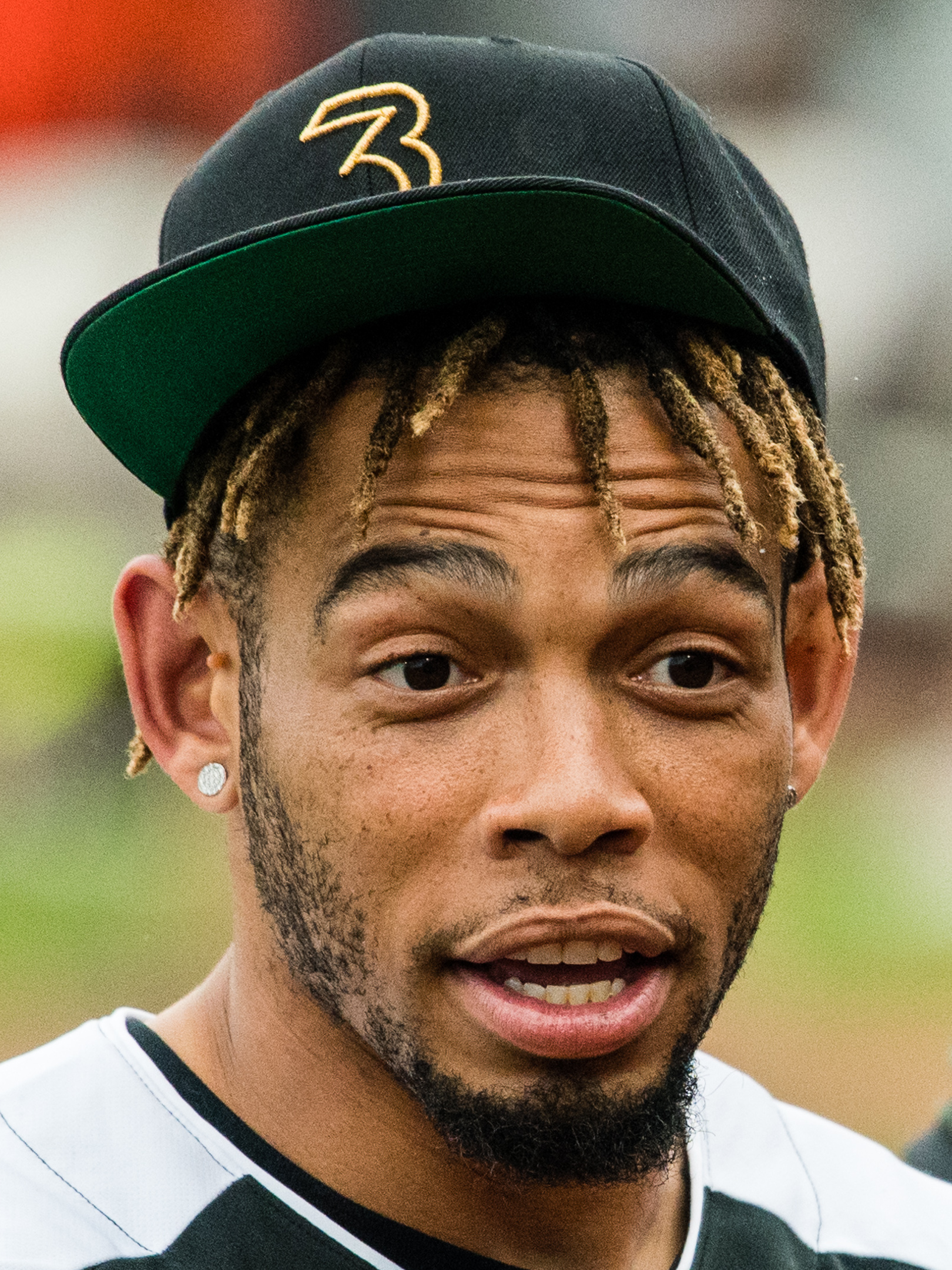
- Haden in 2019

No. 23, 21
- Position: Cornerback

Personal information
- Born: April 14, 1989 (age 37); Fort Washington, Maryland, U.S.
- Listed height: 5 ft 11 in (1.80 m)
- Listed weight: 195 lb (88 kg)

Career information
- High school: Friendly (Fort Washington)
- College: Florida (2007–2009)
- NFL draft: 2010: 1st round, 7th overall pick

Career history
- Cleveland Browns (2010–2016); Pittsburgh Steelers (2017–2021)

Awards and highlights
- Second-team All-Pro (2013); 3× Pro Bowl (2013, 2014, 2019); PFWA All-Rookie Team (2010); BCS national champion (2008); Unanimous All-American (2009); First-team All-SEC (2009)

Career NFL statistics
- Total tackles: 615
- Sacks: 3.0
- Pass deflections: 155
- Interceptions: 29
- Forced fumbles: 7
- Fumble recoveries: 6
- Defensive touchdowns: 2
- Stats at Pro Football Reference

Joseph Walter Haden III (born April 14, 1989) is an American former professional football player who was a cornerback for 12 seasons in the National Football League (NFL). He played college football for the Florida Gators, earning unanimous All-American honors and was a member of a BCS National Championship team. He was selected by the Cleveland Browns in the first round of the 2010 NFL draft and played for them for seven seasons. He also played for the Pittsburgh Steelers for five seasons.

== Early life ==
Haden attended Friendly High School in Fort Washington, Maryland, where he played safety and quarterback for the Friendly Patriots high school football team. He led the team to a 14–0 record and a MPSSAA Class 3A State Championship during his senior season in 2006. He set the Maryland state record with 7,371 career passing yards and tied the record for touchdown passes with 80. He was first discovered as an MVP at the National Underclassmen Combine camp in New Jersey alongside current NFL quarterback Tyrod Taylor. Haden was selected to play in the first Offense-Defense All-American Bowl.

In addition to football, Haden was also the point guard on the basketball team that won two state titles.

Considered a four-star recruit by Rivals.com, Haden was listed as the No. 3 athlete in the nation in 2007. He chose Florida over offers from Pittsburgh, Ohio State and Tennessee.

== College career ==
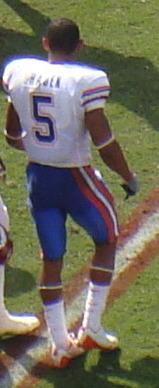
Haden with the Florida Gators in 2008

Haden accepted an athletic scholarship to attend the University of Florida in Gainesville, Florida, where he played for coach Urban Meyer's Florida Gators football team from 2007 to 2009.

As a true freshman in 2007, Haden started 12 games at cornerback, missing one game due to an ankle sprain. He became the first true freshman to start a game at cornerback for the Gators on opening day, and finished the season with 63 tackles and an interception. He was recognized as a freshman All-American by the Sporting News and Collegefootballnews.com and was an All-Southeastern Conference (SEC) freshman selection.

As a sophomore in 2008, Haden started all 14 games, recording 87 tackles, and three interceptions—including an 88-yard interception return for a touchdown (the fourth longest in Gators history). In the Gators' 24–14 victory over the Oklahoma Sooners in the BCS Championship Game, he had 10 tackles and three pass break-ups.

During his junior year in 2009, he had 68 tackles, four interceptions and three quarterback sacks. After the season, he was a first-team All-SEC selection, and was recognized as a unanimous first-team All-American. He also shared the Gators' most valuable player award with quarterback Tim Tebow, and was named the National Defensive Player of the Year by the Sporting News.

Haden decided to forgo his senior season at Florida and enter the NFL draft.

== Professional career ==
=== Pre-draft ===
Coming out of Florida, Haden was projected to be a first-round pick by the majority of NFL draft experts and scouts. He received an invitation to the NFL Combine and completed all of the required combine and positional drills. Haden disappointed scouts with a 4.52-second time in the 40-yard dash, which is average for an NFL cornerback, but it was later revealed he had a sore back at that time.

External videos
- Joe Haden's NFL Combine workout
- NFL Draft Profile: Joe Haden

On March 17, 2010, he participated at Florida's pro day and opted to rerun the 40, 20, and 10-yard dash as well as the short shuttle. He was able to shorten his time in all, running a 4.43 in the 40-yard dash, a 2.60 in the 20, and a 1.53 in the ten-yard dash. Over 75 representatives from all 32 NFL teams attended including head coaches Eric Mangini (Cleveland Browns), Mike Tomlin (Pittsburgh Steelers), John Fox (Carolina Panthers), Raheem Morris (Tampa Bay Buccaneers), and Tom Coughlin (New York Giants) He was ranked as the top cornerback prospect in the draft by NFLDraftScout.com and SI.com.

Pre-draft measurables
Height	Weight	Arm length	Hand span	40-yard dash	10-yard split	20-yard split	20-yard shuttle	Three-cone drill	Vertical jump	Broad jump	Bench press
5 ft 10 3/4 in (1.80 m)	193 lb (88 kg)	32 3/4 in (0.83 m)	9 1/2 in (0.24 m)	4.52 s	1.53 s	2.56 s	4.34 s	6.94 s	35 in (0.89 m)	10 ft 5 in (3.18 m)	18 reps
All values from NFL Combine

=== Cleveland Browns ===
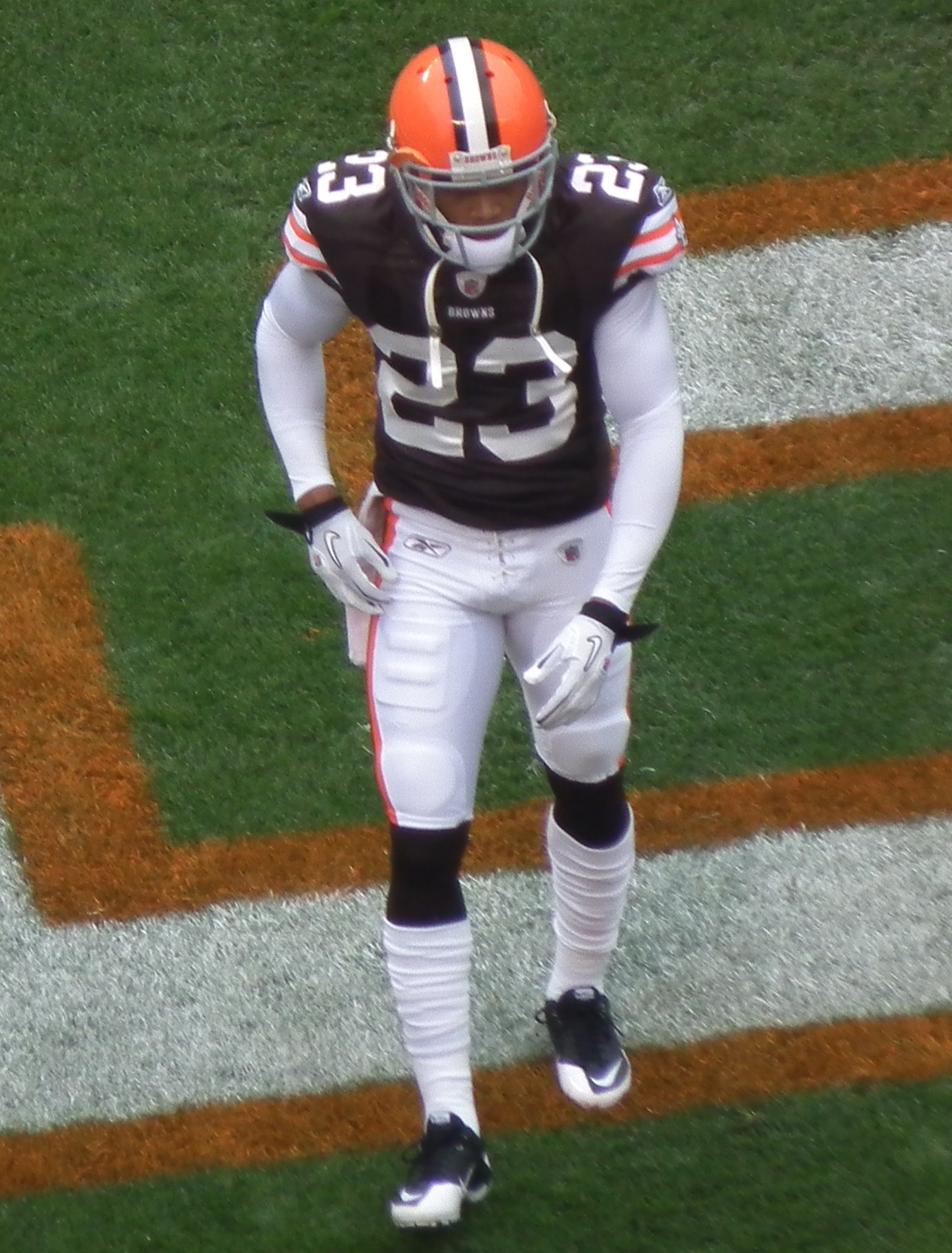
Haden with the Browns in 2010

External videos
- First Draft: Joe Haden

==== 2010 ====
The Browns selected Haden in the first round (seventh overall) of the 2010 NFL draft. On July 31, 2010, the Browns signed Haden to a five-year, $50 million contract that includes $26 million guaranteed.

Haden entered training camp competing with Sheldon Brown and Eric Wright for a starting cornerback position. He was named the third cornerback on the depth chart behind Brown and Wright to begin the regular season.

Haden made his professional regular season debut in the Browns' season-opener against the Buccaneers, finishing with two combined tackles and a pass deflection during a 17–14 loss. He earned his first start during the game as the Browns' kick returner. On October 17, 2010, he made two combined tackles, a pass deflection, and made his first career interception, picking off Steelers quarterback Ben Roethlisberger during a 28–10 loss. On November 14, 2010, Haden made a season-high seven solo tackles and intercepted New York Jets quarterback Mark Sanchez during a 26–20 overtime loss. The next game, he recorded three solo tackles, deflected three passes, and intercepted Jacksonville Jaguars quarterback David Garrard during a 24–20 loss. On November 28, 2010, Haden earned his first start at cornerback and recorded three combined tackles, a pass deflection, and intercepted Jimmy Clausen as the Browns defeated the Panthers, 24–23. During a Week 13 victory over the Miami Dolphins, Haden collected six combined tackles, four pass deflections, and intercepted Dolphins' quarterback Chad Henne for his fourth consecutive game with a pick. Haden became the first Browns player since 1968 to intercept a pass in four consecutive games. On December 26, 2010, he recorded five combined tackles and sacked Joe Flacco for the first of his career during a 20–10 loss to the Baltimore Ravens. He finished his rookie season with 64 combined tackles, 6 interceptions and one forced fumble.

==== 2011 ====
Haden entered 2011 as the starting cornerback, alongside Sheldon Brown. He started the Browns' season-opening 27–17 loss to the Cincinnati Bengals and recorded three combined tackles and a season-high five pass deflections. On December 8, 2012, Haden accumulated a season-high eight combined tackles, as the Browns were defeated by the Steelers, 13–9. He finished the season with a total of 65 combined tackles (53 solo), 19 pass deflections, and a sack in 15 games and 15 starts.

==== 2012 ====
During the Browns' season-opening 17–16 loss to the Philadelphia Eagles, Haden recorded six combined tackles and a pass deflection, and intercepted Eagles' quarterback Michael Vick, returning it for 50-yards. On October 17, 2012, Haden collected seven combined tackles, a season-high three pass deflections, and intercepted Bengals' quarterback Andy Dalton, as the Browns defeated the Bengals, 34–24. In Week 8, he had a season-high eight combined tackles during a 7–6 victory over the San Diego Chargers.

On September 10, 2012, the NFL announced that Haden would receive a four-game suspension after testing positive for Adderall. This resulted in him losing four game checks worth ($1.356 million) and missing Weeks 2–5. He completed the season with 51 combined tackles (40 solo), 10 pass deflections, and three interceptions in 11 games and 11 starts.

==== 2013 ====
In Week 3, Haden recorded a season-high eight combined tackles and deflected a pass during a victory over the Minnesota Vikings. During a Week 9 victory over the Ravens, Haden made six combined tackles, two pass deflections, and intercepted Joe Flacco for his first interception of the season. On November 17, 2013, he collected two combined tackles, two pass deflections, and intercepted Bengals' quarterback Andy Dalton twice, as the Browns lost, 41–20. It was Haden's first career game with multiple interceptions and he also returned one of them for 44 yards to score his first career touchdown.

On December 27, 2013, Haden was selected for his first Pro Bowl. On January 3, 2014, Haden received his first All-Pro selection, making the second team. He finished the 2013 season with 54 combined tackles (43 solo), 20 pass deflections, four interceptions, and a touchdown in 15 games and 15 starts. He was ranked 39th by his fellow players on the NFL Top 100 Players of 2014.

==== 2014 ====
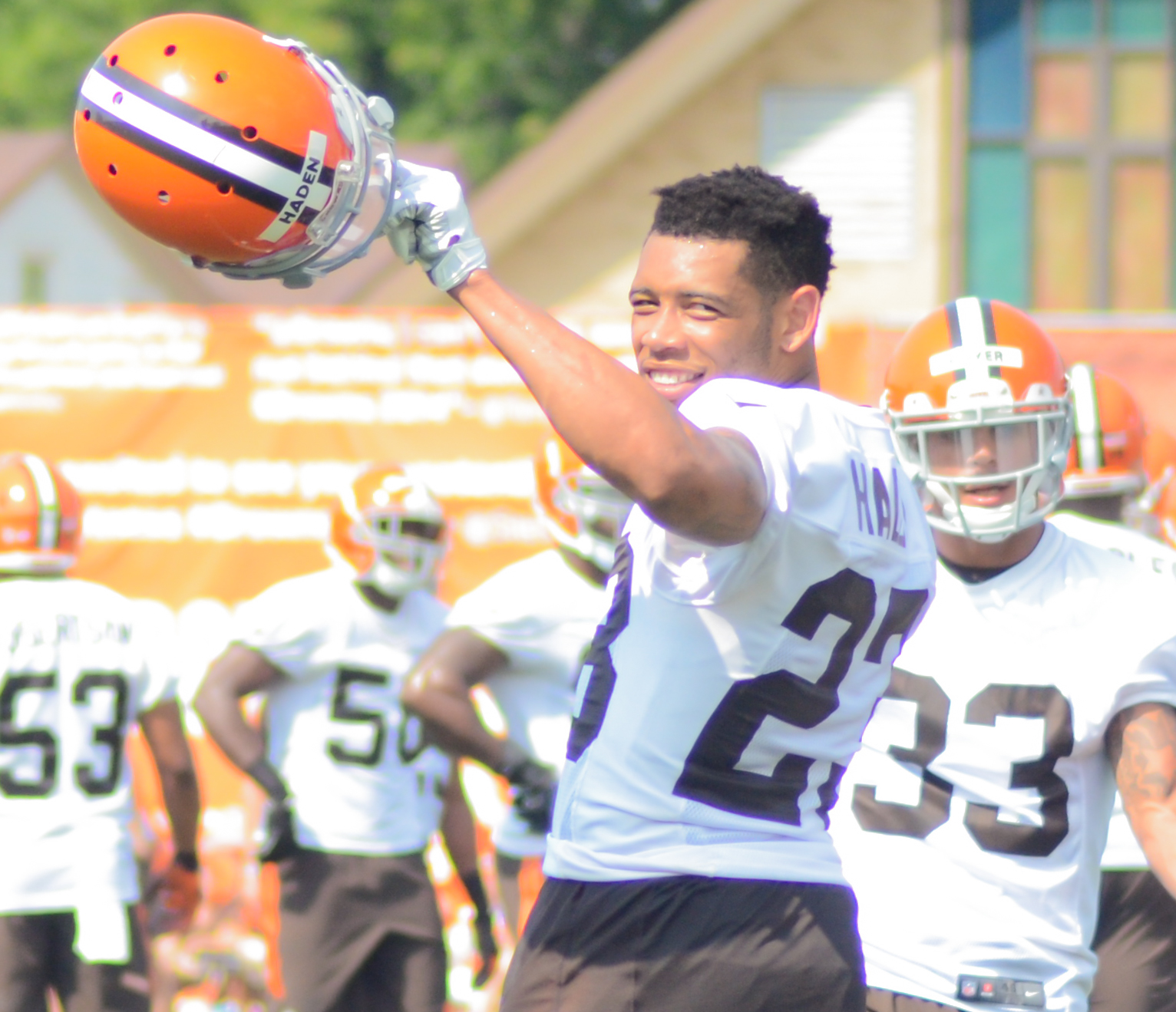
Haden at 2014 Browns training camp

On May 13, 2014, the Browns signed Haden to a five-year, $68 million contract extension with $45 million guaranteed.

On November 16, 2014, he collected a career-high 13 combined tackles, a pass deflection, and intercepted Houston Texans quarterback Ryan Mallett, as the Browns lost, 23–7. The following game, Haden recorded five solo tackles, a pass deflection, and intercepted Atlanta Falcons quarterback Matt Ryan, helping the Browns win, 26–24. During a Week 13 loss to the Buffalo Bills, he made one tackle and two pass deflections, and intercepted Bills' quarterback Kyle Orton marking his third consecutive game with an interception.

He finished the season with a career-high 73 combined tackles (58 solo), 20 pass deflections, and three interceptions in 15 games and 15 starts. Haden was also voted to his second consecutive Pro Bowl. He was ranked 23rd by his fellow players on the NFL Top 100 Players of 2015.

==== 2015 ====
Haden began the 2015 season as the Browns' starting corner, along with Tramon Williams. In their season-opening loss against the Jets, Haden made a season-high six combined tackles and a pass deflection. On October 13, 2015, it was reported that Haden had suffered a groin injury during practice. The injury caused him to miss multiple games throughout the season.

On December 14, 2015, Haden was placed on injured reserve with a concussion, ending his season. He finished the season with 22 combined tackles (18 solo) and two pass deflections while starting only five games and playing in five.

==== 2016 ====
New Browns head coach Hue Jackson named Haden and Tramon Williams their starting cornerbacks in 2016.

On September 18, Haden recorded four combined tackles, found pass deflections, and intercepted Ravens quarterback Joe Flacco twice, as the Browns were defeated, 25–20. On October 9, he collected a season-high seven combined tackles in the Browns' 33–13 loss to the New England Patriots. During a Week 2 loss to the Ravens, he recorded a tackle and two pass deflections, and intercepted Ravens' quarterback Joe Flacco, as the Browns lost, 28–7. It marked his third interception of the season, all three coming off of Flacco. He finished the season with a total of 48 combined tackle (37 combined), 11 pass deflections, and three interceptions in 13 games and 13 starts.

==== 2017 ====
On August 30, 2017, Haden was released by the Browns after seven seasons with the team. The release took place after many attempts to trade him and Haden reportedly refused to take a reduced salary, from $11 million to $7 million, to stay with the Browns.

=== Pittsburgh Steelers ===
On August 30, 2017, hours after being released, the Steelers signed Haden to a three-year, $27 million contract with a signing bonus of $5.75 million. He reportedly turned down multiple richer contract offers from other teams. Unable to acquire jersey number 23 from starting strong safety Mike Mitchell, Haden switched his jersey number to 21 in honor of Deion Sanders after purchasing the number from Robert Golden.

External videos
- Joe Haden agrees to terms with Steelers

He was named the starting left cornerback opposite Artie Burns to begin the regular season. Haden earned his first start with the Steelers in their season-opener against his former team, the Browns. He finished the 21–18 victory with six combined tackles, a pass deflection, and a sack on DeShone Kizer. On October 22, 2017, Haden recorded one tackle and made his first interception since joining the Steelers, intercepting Bengals' quarterback Andy Dalton in a 29–14 victory. On November 12, 2017, Haden suffered a fractured fibula during a 20–17 victory over the Indianapolis Colts. It was determined that he would not have to undergo surgery and would miss five to six weeks. On December 25, 2017, he made his return after missing five games and recorded two solo tackles and a pass deflection during a 34–6 victory at the Texans. Haden finished the 2017 season with 20 combined tackles (18 solo), seven pass deflections, a sack, and an interception in 11 games and 11 starts. Pro Football Focus (PFF) gave Haden an overall grade of 79.2 for the 2017 season. His grade ranked 51st among all cornerbacks.

The Steelers finished the season atop the AFC North with a 13–3 record. On January 14, 2018, Haden started his first career playoff game and made four solo tackles and a pass deflection in a 45–42 loss to the Jaguars in the AFC Divisional Round.

==== 2018 ====
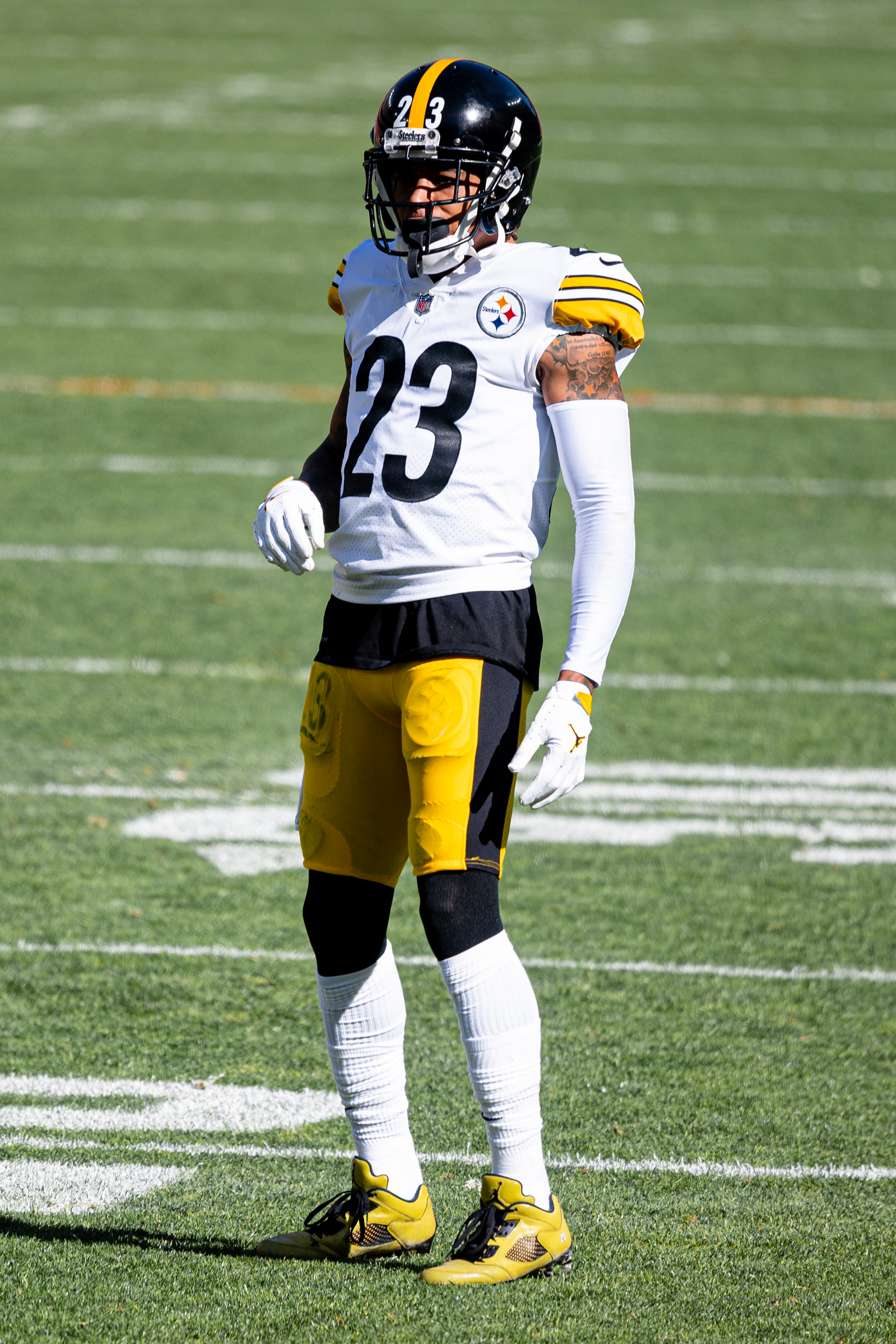
Haden in 2021

For the 2018 season, following the Steelers' release of Mitchell, Haden switched back to 23 with Sean Davis switching to 21 from 28 in honor of Sean Taylor. In Week 8 against the Browns, Haden made 3 tackles and intercepted quarterback Baker Mayfield. In a week 15 matchup versus the Patriots, Haden recorded 12 tackles and made a leaping fourth-quarter interception in the red zone off a pass thrown by Tom Brady as the Steelers held on to a 14–10 lead. Haden went on to win the AFC Defensive Player of the Week award and the Steelers won the game 17–10. He finished the 2018 season with 63 total tackles (51 solo), two interceptions, and 12 passes defended. He received an overall grade of 70.9 from PFF in 2018, which ranked as the 38th highest grade among all qualifying corner backs.

==== 2019 ====
On September 1, 2019, Haden signed a two-year, $22 million contract extension with the Steelers through the 2021 season. In Week 10 against the Los Angeles Rams, Haden recorded 7 tackles, made 5 pass deflections, intercepted a pass thrown by Jared Goff, and deflected a pass which was intercepted by teammate Minkah Fitzpatrick late in the fourth quarter in the 17–12 win. In Week 13 against his former team, the Browns, Haden recorded an interception off a pass thrown by Baker Mayfield with one minute left in the game which sealed a 20–13 Steelers' win. In Week 14 against the Arizona Cardinals, Haden recorded two interceptions off rookie quarterback Kyler Murray, the latter of which occurred late in the fourth quarter to seal a 23–17 win. In Week 17 against the Ravens, Haden intercepted a pass thrown by former teammate Robert Griffin III and recovered a fumble forced by T. J. Watt on running back Gus Edwards during the 28–10 loss. He finished the 2019 season with 65 total tackles (59 solo), five interceptions, 17 passes defended, one forced fumble, and one fumble recovery.

On January 15, 2020, Haden was named to the 2020 Pro Bowl as a replacement for Marcus Peters.

==== 2020 ====
In Week 2 against the Denver Broncos, Haden recorded his first interception of the season off a pass thrown by Jeff Driskel during the 26–21 win. In Week 12 against the Ravens, Haden intercepted a pass thrown by former Browns teammate Robert Griffin III and returned it for a 14 yard touchdown during the 19–14 win. This was Haden's second career pick six and his first as a member of the Steelers. He was placed on the reserve/COVID-19 list by the team on January 2, 2021, and activated on January 18. He finished the 2020 season with 52 total tackles (44 solo), two interceptions, and 12 passes defended.

==== 2021 ====
Haden finished the 2021 season with 38 total tackles (26 solo), six passes defended, one forced fumble, and one fumble recovery.

=== Retirement ===
On September 21, 2022, Haden announced his retirement and signed a one-day contract with the Browns.

== NFL career statistics ==
Year	Team	Games		Tackles				Interceptions						Fumbles		
Year	Team	GP	GS	Cmb	Solo	Ast	Sck	Int	Yds	Avg	Lng	TD	PD	FF	FR	Yds
2010	CLE	16	7	64	57	7	1.0	6	101	16.8	62	0	18	1	0	0
2011	CLE	15	15	65	53	12	1.0	0	0	0.0	0	0	19	1	1	0
2012	CLE	11	11	51	40	11	0.0	3	64	21.3	50	0	11	1	0	0
2013	CLE	15	15	54	43	11	0.0	4	57	14.3	29	1	20	0	0	0
2014	CLE	15	15	73	58	15	0.0	3	0	0.0	0	0	20	1	2	34
2015	CLE	5	5	22	18	4	0.0	0	0	0.0	0	0	2	0	1	0
2016	CLE	13	13	48	37	11	0.0	3	9	3.0	9	0	11	0	0	0
2017	PIT	11	11	20	18	2	1.0	1	1	1.0	1	0	7	0	0	0
2018	PIT	15	15	63	51	12	0.0	2	0	0.0	0	0	12	1	0	0
2019	PIT	16	16	65	59	6	0.0	5	20	4.0	16	0	17	1	1	3
2020	PIT	14	14	52	44	8	0.0	2	38	19.0	24	1	12	0	0	0
2021	PIT	12	11	38	26	12	0.0	0	0	0.0	0	0	6	1	1	0
Career		158	148	615	504	111	3.0	29	290	10.0	62	2	155	7	6	37

== Personal life ==
Haden was born in Fort Washington, Maryland to parents Joe and Zakiya Haden. He is the eldest of five boys; his brother Josh was a running back for Boston College, his brother Jordan played safety for Toledo, and his brother Jonathan played running back for UAB. His brother Jacob suffers from a cognitive disorder and struggles to verbally communicate. Haden advocates on behalf of Spread the Word to End the Word to discourage pejorative use of the word "retarded."

On June 29, 2013, Haden married Sarah Mahmoodshahi in Miami Beach, Florida. The couple resides in Marshall Township, Pennsylvania. Haden is a practicing Christian.

=== Deebo & Joe ===
In 2025, Haden began co-hosting the podcast Deebo & Joe alongside former NFL player James Harrison. The podcast features the two former players discussing NFL news, notable plays, current events, and their experiences in professional football, as well as topics involving culture and life outside of football.

== See also ==
- 2008 Florida Gators football team
- 2009 College Football All-America Team
- List of Cleveland Browns first-round draft picks
- List of Florida Gators football All-Americans
- List of Florida Gators in the NFL draft
