= Artie Burns =

American football player (born 1995)

Profile
- Position: Cornerback

Personal information
- Born: May 1, 1995 (age 31); Miami, Florida, U.S.
- Listed height: 6 ft 0 in (1.83 m)
- Listed weight: 187 lb (85 kg)

Career information
- High school: Miami Northwestern
- College: Miami (FL) (2013–2015)
- NFL draft: 2016: 1st round, 25th overall pick

Career history
- Pittsburgh Steelers (2016–2019); Chicago Bears (2020–2021); Seattle Seahawks (2022–2024); Miami Dolphins (2025)

Awards and highlights
- Second-team All-ACC (2015)

Career NFL statistics as of 2025
- Total tackles: 199
- Forced fumbles: 1
- Fumble recoveries: 2
- Pass deflections: 38
- Interceptions: 4
- Stats at Pro Football Reference

Artie Tyrone Burns Jr. (born May 1, 1995) is an American professional football cornerback. He played college football for the Miami Hurricanes, and was selected by the Pittsburgh Steelers in the first round of the 2016 NFL draft.

== Early life ==
A native of Miami, Burns attended Miami Northwestern High School, where he played defensive back and was a teammate of former Pittsburgh Steelers teammate wide receiver Eli Rogers, Dolphins quarterback Teddy Bridgewater, and Browns wide receiver Amari Cooper. As a junior, playing safety, Burns made 80 tackles, 10 for losses. He also broke up 87 passes, caused 17 fumbles, and made 22 interceptions. Regarded as a four-star recruit by Rivals.com, Burns was listed as the No. 15 cornerback prospect in his class.

He committed to Miami, where the Hurricanes hoped to pair him with Tracy Howard on the outside.

He was an All-USA high school track and field team selection by USA Today in 2011 and 2012. At the 2011 USA Youth outdoor track and field championships, Burns won both the 110-meter hurdles (13.90), and the 400-meter hurdles (52.23). At the 2012 Bob Hayes Invitational, Burns broke records in the 110 hurdles (13.35) and the 300 (36.14), both originally set by Michael Timpson in 1985. His 110 hurdles time was the second-fastest worldwide by a youth athlete in 2012, behind only Wilhem Belocian's 13.29 at the 2012 World Junior Championships in Athletics in Barcelona. In 2012 Burns had the No. 5 time in the World (No. 1 in USA) in the 110-meter hurdles amongst junior athletes (under 20). In 2014 Burns broke the American junior record in the indoor 60-meter hurdles, breaking a 38-year-old record.

== College career ==
=== College statistics ===
			Defense				
Year	Team	GP	Tackles	For Loss	Passes Def	Int	FF
2013	Miami	9	17	0.5	3	1	1
2014	Miami	13	40	2.0	6	0	0
2015	Miami	12	36	0.5	5	6	0
College totals		34	93	3.0	14	7	1

== Professional career ==
=== Pre-draft ===
Coming out of the University of Miami, Burns was projected by analysts to be a first or second round pick. He attended the NFL Combine but was unable to complete all the drills after suffering a knee injury. He stood on his combine numbers at the Miami Hurricane's Pro Day, but chose to redo the vertical and added two inches while completing the other drills he was unable to perform at the combine. He worked out with 12 other Miami Hurricanes in front of representatives from a total of 31 teams, including Steelers' head coach Mike Tomlin. Although his Pro Day numbers were hampered by a torrential downpour, he was able to proceed and complete his drills. After his workout, general managers from three teams commented that he is a top cornerback prospect.

External videos
- Artie Burns' NFL Combine Workout

Pre-draft measurables
Height	Weight	Arm length	Hand span	40-yard dash	10-yard split	20-yard split	20-yard shuttle	Three-cone drill	Vertical jump	Broad jump	Bench press
5 ft 11 7/8 in (1.83 m)	193 lb (88 kg)	33 1/4 in (0.84 m)	9 1/2 in (0.24 m)	4.46 s	1.56 s	2.63 s	4.33 s	6.96 s	33 in (0.84 m)	10 ft 4 in (3.15 m)	7 reps
All values from NFL Combine and Miami Hurricane's Pro Day

=== Pittsburgh Steelers ===
==== 2016 ====
The Pittsburgh Steelers selected Burns in the first round with the 25th overall pick in the 2016 NFL draft. He was the first cornerback selected by the Steelers in the first round since Chad Scott was selected 24th overall in 1997 NFL draft. On June 8, 2016, the Steelers signed him to a four-year, $9.59 million rookie contract with a $5.17 million signing bonus.

External videos
- Steelers draft Artie Burns 25th overall
- 2017 NFL Draft: Artie Burns' Highlights

Burns was expected to compete against Ross Cockrell and Senquez Golson for the role as the second cornerback in training camp. His development was delayed after suffering a strained quad that limited his participation in training camp and caused him to miss the first three preseason games. He started the season as the third cornerback behind veterans William Gay and Cockrell. Safety Sean Davis was designated the starting nickelback for the start of the season. On September 12, 2016, he made his professional debut against the Washington Redskins. On October 16, 2016, Burns made a season-high five solo tackles during a 30–15 loss to the Miami Dolphins. The following game, he made four solo tackles during a loss against the New England Patriots. Burns was promoted to the starting nickelback position for the sixth game of the season after fellow rookie Sean Davis played in the slot for the first five games.

On November 6, 2016, Burns started his first career game against the Baltimore Ravens and intercepted a pass by Joe Flacco in the first quarter. He was named the starter over Gay and his interception was the first of any Steelers defensive back of the season. The following game, Burns recorded six combined tackles in a 35–30 loss to the Dallas Cowboys. In a Week 11 matchup with the Cleveland Browns, he made three solo tackles and intercepted Cody Kessler on the Brown's first drive, helping the Pittsburgh Steelers win 24–9. On December 4, 2016, Burns recorded a season-high six solo tackles and an assisted tackle during a 24–14 win over the New York Giants. The next game, the Pittsburgh Steelers defeated the Buffalo Bills and Burns made three solo tackles and intercepted Tyrod Taylor for his third pick of the season. On January 1, 2017, he racked up a season-high eight combined tackles and deflected a pass as the Steelers defeated the Cleveland Browns 27–24.

He finished his rookie season with a total of 65 combined tackles, 13 pass deflections, and three interceptions in 16 games and nine starts. He also played 810 out of 1,046 defensive snaps. Burns started the last seven games of the season as the Steelers' outside cornerback opposite Cockrell, with veteran Gay covering the slot. On January 8, 2017, Burns started in his first career postseason game and recorded three solo tackles and one assist in the Pittsburgh Steelers' 30–12 AFC Wild Card Round victory over the Miami Dolphins.

==== 2017 ====
Burns was named the starting cornerback to begin the regular season, along with newly acquired free agent Joe Haden. Burns started the Pittsburgh Steelers' season-opening 21–18 victory over the Browns and recorded three combined tackles. In Week 2, Burns made three combined tackles, deflected a pass, and recovered a fumble by wide receiver Adam Thielen in the fourth quarter of the 26–9 victory over the Minnesota Vikings. On October 29, 2017, Burns recorded a season-high nine combined tackles as the Steelers defeated the Detroit Lions 20–15. On December 25, 2017, he made two combined tackles, a pass deflection, and made his only interception of the season on a pass attempt by Houston Texans quarterback Tom Savage as the Steelers won 34–6. Burns finished the 2017 season with 54 combined tackles (47 solo), 13 pass deflections, a fumble recovery, and an interception in 16 games and 16 starts. Burns received a grade of 70.5 from Pro Football Focus. His grade ranked 44th among all cornerbacks.

==== 2018 ====
In Week 2 against the Kansas City Chiefs, Burns recorded his first career safety when he tackled Kareem Hunt in the endzone in the 42–37 loss. On December 2, in the final play of a game against the Los Angeles Chargers, Burns jumped offsides three times during Chargers' kicker Michael Badgley's attempt to convert a game-winning field goal. Overall, Burns played in all 16 games and started six. He recorded 22 total tackles, one pass defensed, and one forced fumble.

==== 2019 ====
On May 1, 2019, the Steelers declined the fifth-year option on Burns's contract, making him a free agent in 2020.

=== Chicago Bears ===
Burns signed with the Chicago Bears on March 26, 2020. On August 18, 2020, Burns was carted off the field after suffering a torn ACL and was ruled out for the season. He was placed on injured reserve two days later.

On March 26, 2021, Burns re-signed with the Bears.

=== Seattle Seahawks ===
Burns signed with the Seattle Seahawks on March 18, 2022.

On May 22, 2023, Burns re-signed with the Seahawks. He was released on August 30, and re-signed to the practice squad. Burns was signed to the active roster on September 20.

On March 15, 2024, Burns re-signed with the Seahawks. He was released on August 27, and re-signed to the practice squad. On October 10, Burns was signed to the active roster, but placed on injured reserve four days later due to a toe injury. He was waived by the Seahawks on December 17. Two days later, Seattle re–signed Burns to their practice squad.

=== Miami Dolphins ===
On March 17, 2025, Burns signed a one-year contract with the Miami Dolphins. After tearing his ACL on the first day of training camp, the Dolphins placed him on injured reserve on July 24.

== Personal life ==
Burns was born to Artie Tyrone Burns and Dana Smith and was raised in Miami, Florida. On October 24, 2006, his father was arrested in South Carolina for trafficking cocaine and was sentenced to 25 years in prison. His father's projected release date is May 24, 2027. His mother died from a heart attack at the age of 44 in October 2015. The University of Miami's digital department raised $40,000 through a GoFundMe account for his mother's medical expenses. Burns also has two sons, A.J. and Saint Cairo, with his girlfriend Ella, and has two younger brothers, Jordan and Thomas. In 2017 he became engaged to Ella.

On February 25, 2015, his brother, Thomas Burns, committed to play football for his alma mater, the University of Miami.

On June 29, 2017, Burns was arrested in Miami, Florida, for driving while his license was suspended for failure to pay traffic citations.
