= Nickelback (American football) =

American football position

A nickel defense with three cornerbacks, lined up against an offense playing three wide receivers

In American football, a nickelback, also referred to as a slot cornerback or slot corner, is a cornerback or safety who serves as the additional defensive back in a nickel defense. A base defense consists of two cornerbacks and two safeties, making the nickelback the fifth defensive back on the field, thus tying the name of the position to the name of the North American 5-cent piece.

== Description ==
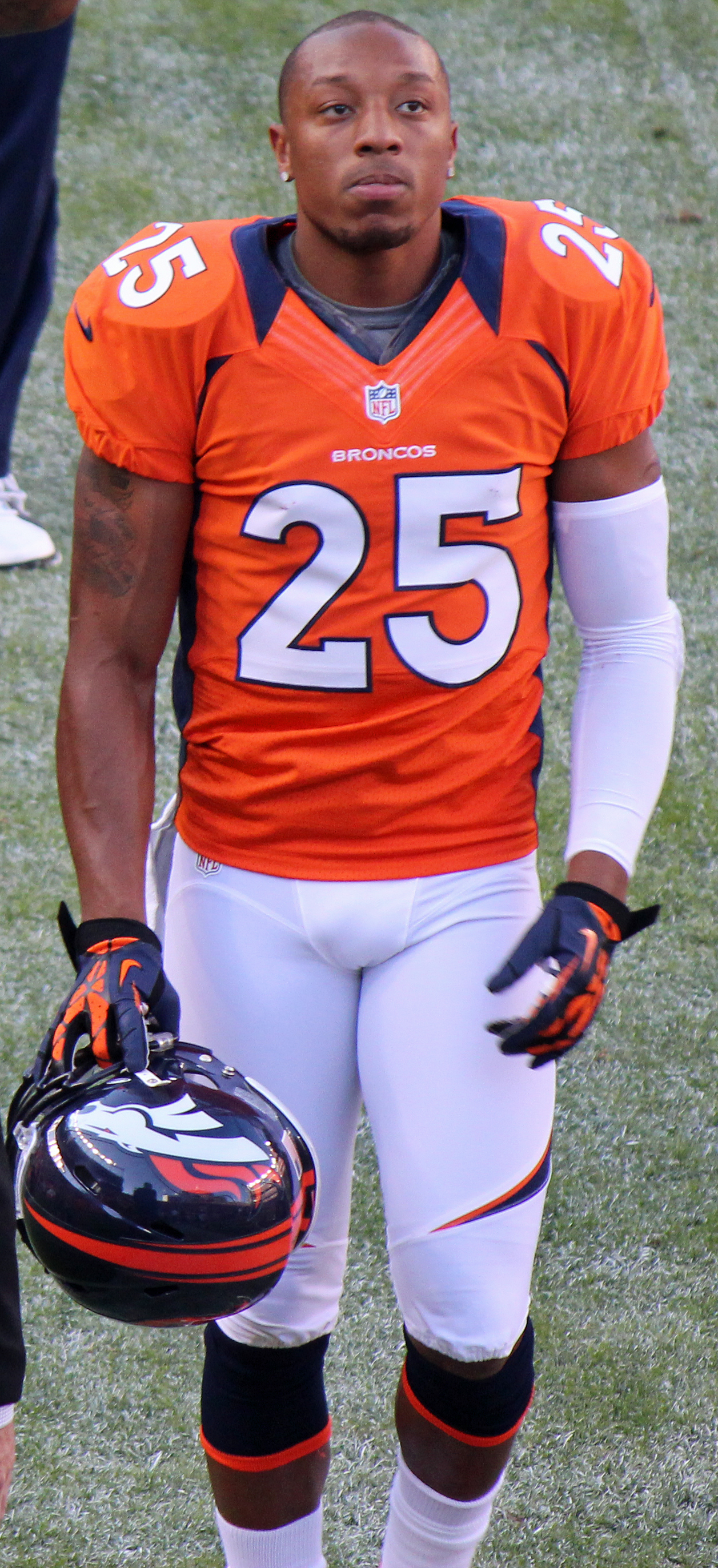
Denver Broncos cornerback Chris Harris Jr. played outside in base defense and shifted to the nickelback position in nickel defense

The nickelback is the third cornerback or safety on the depth chart. Usually, the nickelback will take the place of a linebacker, so if the team had been in a 4–3 formation, the four defensive linemen would remain, alongside only two linebackers and now-five defensive backs, creating a 4–2–5 formation. However, some teams will replace a lineman rather than a linebacker, creating a three-linemen, three-linebacker and five-defensive back alignment, a 3–3–5 formation.

If an offensive team always uses three or more wide receivers, a defense may turn to a nickel defense for their base package on most plays. Usually, extra defensive backs, such as a nickelback, are substituted into the defense in situations where the opposing offense is likely to attempt a forward pass, such as 3rd-and-long, or when extra receivers are substituted into the opposing offense. In other cases, the nickelback must also be able to tackle in the open field in run situations, and as such, the position can be considered a hybrid run/pass defender, and in some cases, such as blitzes, even a pass rusher from outside the box.

The nickelback is generally not considered a starting position because the starting formations for most defenses are either a 3–4 or a 4–3, in which only two cornerbacks and two safeties are utilized. Defensive formations with three or more cornerbacks (or three safeties) are used often enough that a nickelback will usually see moderate playing time—particularly in the modern, pass-oriented National Football League (NFL)—as well as substituting in for the starting cornerbacks. Some teams, such as the Sean McDermott-era Buffalo Bills, have used a base nickel defense, with slot corners serving as consistent starters due to this philosophy. Notable defensive backs known for playing primarily in the slot include Ronde Barber, Chris Harris Jr., Mike Hilton, Kenny Moore II, Tyrann Mathieu, Taron Johnson, Kyle Hamilton, Trent McDuffie, and Cooper DeJean.

In Canadian football or the Canadian Football League (CFL), where five defensive backs are considered the norm, the position is known as a defensive halfback.
