= 2021 Tennessee Titans season =

62nd season in franchise history

- Owner: KSA Industries
- General manager: Jon Robinson
- Head coach: Mike Vrabel
- Offensive coordinator: Todd Downing
- Defensive coordinator: Shane Bowen
- Home stadium: Nissan Stadium

Results
- Record: 12–5
- Division place: 1st AFC South
- Playoffs: Lost Divisional Playoffs (vs. Bengals) 16–19
- All-Pros: FS Kevin Byard (1st team); DE Jeffery Simmons (2nd team)
- Pro Bowlers: FS Kevin Byard; DT Jeffery Simmons (alternate); OG Rodger Saffold (alternate); OLB Harold Landry (alternate)

Uniform
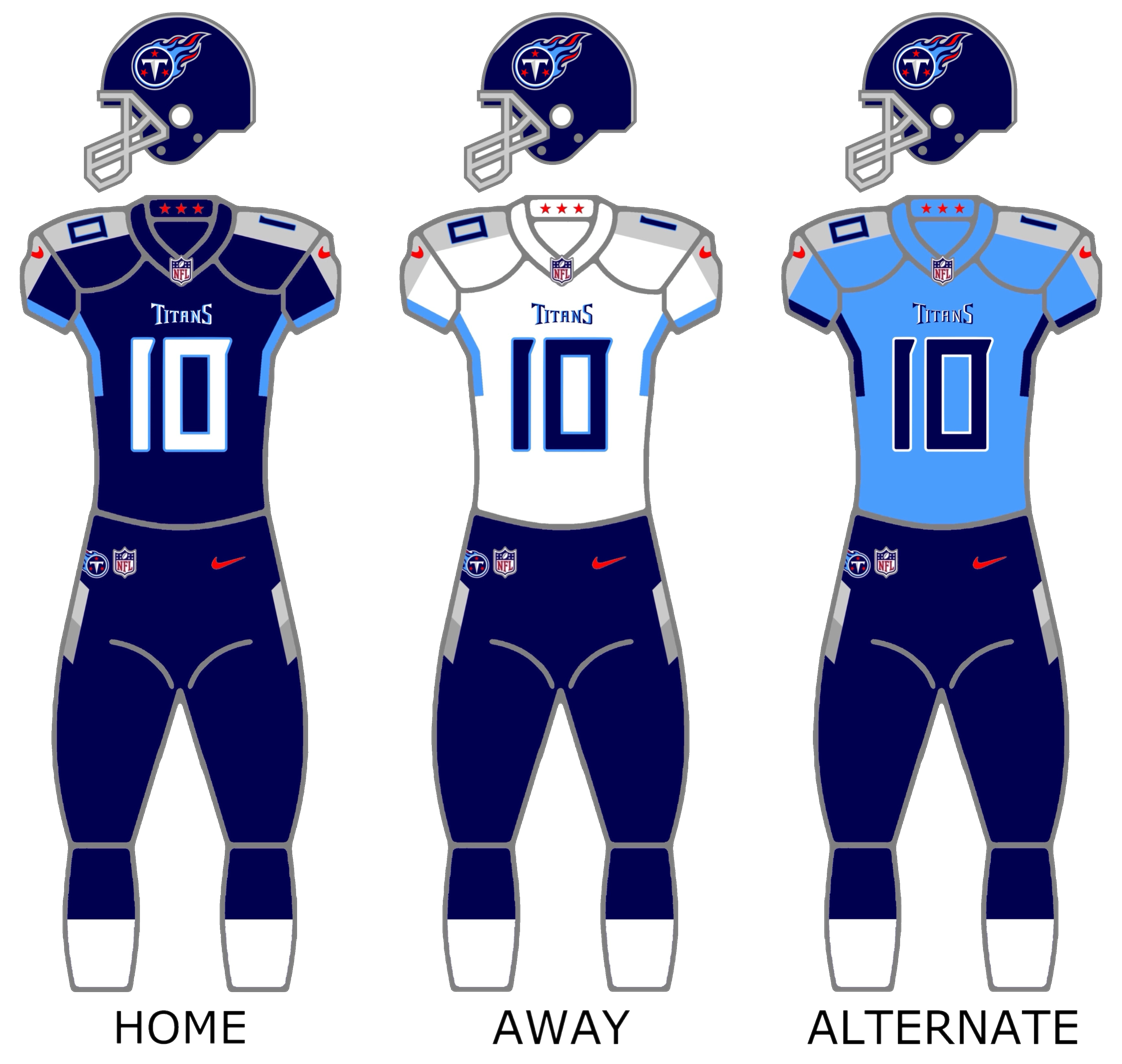

The 2021 season was the Tennessee Titans' 52nd season in the National Football League (NFL), their 62nd overall, their 25th in the state of Tennessee, and their fourth under head coach Mike Vrabel. After a 34–3 win over the Miami Dolphins in Week 17, the Titans clinched the AFC South for the second consecutive season. It would be the first time since 1960–1962 that the franchise would win its division in back-to-back seasons. The Titans finished 12–5, improving on their 11–5 record from the prior year and earning the AFC's No. 1 seed in the playoffs for the first time since 2008. The season ended with a 19–16 loss to eventual AFC champion Cincinnati Bengals, the third consecutive playoff loss.

Injuries were a significant storyline for the Titans throughout the season. Many standout players missed multiple games, including Derrick Henry, the reigning Offensive Player of the Year. Through the first 7 weeks of the season, Henry not only led the NFL in rushing yards but was on pace to break the Eric Dickerson's single-season rushing record. However, Henry would sustain a foot fracture in Week 8 against the Indianapolis Colts and was forced to miss the final 9 games of the regular season. Offseason acquisition Julio Jones, who was acquired in a major trade after 10 seasons with the Atlanta Falcons, was additionally forced to miss 7 games due to a lingering hamstring injury. The Titans would eventually set an NFL record for most players used in a season with 91 individual players. The Titans' regular season success in spite of these injuries contributed to head coach Mike Vrabel winning the AP NFL Coach of the Year award. As of 2025, this is the most recent season that the Titans have made the playoffs, finished the season in first place in the AFC South and finished the season with a winning record.

== Offseason ==
=== Coaching changes ===
On January 15, 2021, Titans offensive coordinator Arthur Smith was hired by the Atlanta Falcons to be their head coach after Smith helped the Titans reach franchise-high offensive production in 2020. Smith had been the Titans offensive coordinator for the previous two seasons and had been with the team since 2011. On January 29, 2021, tight ends coach Todd Downing was promoted to offensive coordinator and outside linebackers coach Shane Bowen was promoted to defensive coordinator. Bowen had been the de facto defensive coordinator in 2020, but his defense that season was ranked 30th in sacks and 28th in yards allowed per game.

=== Roster changes ===
==== Reserve/future free agent contracts ====
Player	Position
Paul Adams	OT
Davin Bellamy	LB
Rashard Davis	WR
Parker Hesse	TE
Cody Hollister	WR
Tommy Hudson	TE
Jan Johnson	LB
Brandon Kemp	OT
Mason Kinsey	WR
DeShone Kizer	QB
Daylon Mack	NT
Tucker McCann	K
Daniel Munyer	C
Nate Orchard	OLB
Matt Orzech	LS
Jared Pinkney	TE
Chester Rogers	WR
Tuzar Skipper	ILB
Maurice Smith	CB
Patrick Morris	C

The Titans signed 14 players to futures contracts on January 11, 2021. Tight end Jared Pinkney was signed to a futures contract later on January 13, 2021. Linebacker Davin Bellamy and defensive end Daylon Mack were signed to futures contacts the next day on January 14, 2021. Wide receiver Mason Kinsey was signed to a futures contract on January 21, 2021. Finally, corner Maurice Smith was signed to a futures contract on February 1, 2021.

==== Free agents ====
2021 Tennessee Titans Free Agency
Position	Player	Status*	Date signed	2020 Team	2021 Team
OLB	Ola Adeniyi	RFA	March 22, 2021	Pittsburgh Steelers	Tennessee Titans
DT	Denico Autry	UFA	March 18, 2021	Indianapolis Colts	Tennessee Titans
LB/ST	Daren Bates	UFA	October 18, 2021	Tennessee Titans	Atlanta Falcons
ILB	B. J. Bello	RFA	April 23, 2021	Los Angeles Chargers	Tennessee Titans
FB	Khari Blasingame	ERFA	March 5, 2021	Tennessee Titans	Tennessee Titans
ILB	Jayon Brown	UFA	March 19, 2021	Tennessee Titans	Tennessee Titans
CB	Breon Borders	ERFA	March 1, 2021	Tennessee Titans	Tennessee Titans
OLB	Jadeveon Clowney	UFA	April 14, 2021	Tennessee Titans	Cleveland Browns
LB/ST	Will Compton	UFA	December 8, 2021	Tennessee Titans	Las Vegas Raiders
LS	Morgan Cox	UFA	March 18, 2021	Baltimore Ravens	Tennessee Titans
DE	Jack Crawford	UFA	August 10, 2021	Tennessee Titans	Arizona Cardinals
WR	Corey Davis	UFA	March 18, 2021	Tennessee Titans	New York Jets
DE	Matt Dickerson	RFA	March 22, 2021	Tennessee Titans	Las Vegas Raiders
G	Jamil Douglas	RFA	April 2, 2021	Tennessee Titans	Buffalo Bills
OLB	Bud Dupree	UFA	March 19, 2021	Pittsburgh Steelers	Tennessee Titans
LB/ST	Nick Dzubnar	UFA	August 16, 2021	Tennessee Titans	Tennessee Titans
FS	Matthias Farley	UFA	March 30, 2021	New York Jets	Tennessee Titans
TE	Anthony Firkser	RFA	March 17, 2021	Tennessee Titans	Tennessee Titans
RB	D'Onta Foreman	RFA	November 2, 2021	Tennessee Titans	Tennessee Titans
K	Stephen Gostkowski	UFA		Tennessee Titans	None
DT	Woodrow Hamilton	UFA	April 23, 2021	Carolina Panthers	Tennessee Titans
DE	Bruce Hector	UFA	April 23, 2021	Carolina Panthers	Tennessee Titans
CB	Janoris Jenkins	UFA	March 19, 2021	New Orleans Saints	Tennessee Titans
CB	Kevin Johnson	UFA	March 22, 2021	Cleveland Browns	Tennessee Titans
CB	Chris Jones	ERFA	April 23, 2021	Minnesota Vikings	Tennessee Titans
NT	DaQuan Jones	UFA	April 20, 2021	Tennessee Titans	Carolina Panthers
SS	Joshua Kalu	RFA	March 30, 2021	Tennessee Titans	New York Giants
CB	Desmond King	UFA	March 30, 2021	Tennessee Titans	Houston Texans
OT	Kendall Lamm	UFA	March 18, 2021	Cleveland Browns	Tennessee Titans
OT	Marshall Newhouse	UFA		Tennessee Titans	None
LS	Matt Overton	UFA	August 16, 2021	Tennessee Titans	Los Angeles Chargers
RB	Senorise Perry	UFA		Tennessee Titans	None
TE	MyCole Pruitt	UFA	June 2, 2021	Tennessee Titans	San Francisco 49ers
WR/RS	Kalif Raymond	UFA	March 25, 2021	Tennessee Titans	Detroit Lions
WR	Josh Reynolds	UFA	March 23, 2021	Los Angeles Rams	Tennessee Titans
OT	Ty Sambrailo	UFA	March 22, 2021	Tennessee Titans	Tennessee Titans
TE	Jonnu Smith	UFA	March 19, 2021	Tennessee Titans	New England Patriots
CB	Tye Smith	UFA	June 3, 2021	Tennessee Titans	Minnesota Vikings
TE	Geoff Swaim	UFA	March 17, 2021	Tennessee Titans	Tennessee Titans
*RFA: Restricted free agent, UFA: Unrestricted free agent, ERFA: Exclusive rights free agent
Legend: = Addition = Departure = Re-signed

==== Departures ====
Position	Player	Date Released/Waived
CB	Malcolm Butler	March 10, 2021
WR	Adam Humphries	February 25, 2021
OT	Dennis Kelly	March 16, 2021
CB	Christopher Milton	February 25, 2021
CB	Kareem Orr	May 6, 2021
SS	Kenny Vaccaro	March 10, 2021

=== Draft ===
2021 Tennessee Titans Draft
Round	Selection	Player	Position	College
1	22	Caleb Farley	CB	Virginia Tech
2	53	Dillon Radunz	OT	North Dakota State
3	92	Monty Rice	LB	Georgia
3*	100	Elijah Molden	CB	Washington
4	109	Dez Fitzpatrick	WR	Louisville
4	135	Rashad Weaver	DE	Pittsburgh
6	205	Racey McMath	WR	LSU
6	215	Brady Breeze	S	Oregon

Pre-draft Notes/Trades

- Titans received their 100th pick as a compensatory selection for the loss of Jack Conklin to the free agency market.
- Jacksonville traded a sixth-round selection (185) to Tennessee in exchange for a seventh-round selection (249) and linebacker Kamalei Correa.
- Kansas City traded a sixth-round selection (215) to Tennessee in exchange for a 2020 seventh-round selection originally acquired from New England via Denver.
- Sixth-round selection from Jacksonville was traded to the Los Angeles Chargers in exchange for the cornerback Desmond King.
- Titans sent Isaiah Wilson and a 2022 seventh-round pick to the Miami for a 2021 seventh-round selection (232).

2021 Tennessee Titans Draft Day Trades
Draft pick year	Round	Overall	Team	Received
2021	3	85	to Green Bay Packers	Received Green Bay's 2021 third-round selection (No. 92 overall) and fourth-round selection (No. 135 overall).
2021	4	126	to Carolina Panthers	Received Carolina's 2021 fourth-round selection (No. 109 overall).
2021	5	166	to Carolina Panthers	Received Carolina's 2021 fourth-round selection (No. 109 overall).
2021	7	232	to Carolina Panthers	Received Carolina's 2021 fourth-round selection (No. 109 overall).

=== Undrafted free agents ===
2021 Tennessee Titans Undrafted Free Agents
Name	Position	School
Blake Haubeil	K	Ohio State
Chandon Herring	G	BYU
Naquan Jones	NT	Michigan State
Cole Banwart	G	Iowa
Tory Carter	FB	LSU
Miller Forristall	TE	Alabama
Briley Moore	TE	Kansas State
Justus Reed	OLB	Virginia Tech
Mekhi Sargent	RB	Iowa
James Smith	P	Cincinnati

Made regular season roster

== Staff ==
2021 Tennessee Titans staff
Front office: Owner – KSA Industries; Controlling owner – Amy Adams Strunk; President/CEO – Burke Nihill; Executive vice president/general manager – Jon Robinson; Vice president of football administration – Vin Marino; Vice president of player personnel – Ryan Cowden; Director of player personnel – Monti Ossenfort; Director of college scouting – Jon Salge; Director of pro scouting – Brian Gardner; Assistant director of pro scouting – Kevin Turks; Pro scout – Blaise Taylor; College scout – Matt Miller; Head coaches: Head coach – Mike Vrabel; Offensive coaches: Offensive coordinator – Todd Downing; Quarterbacks – Pat O'Hara; Running backs – Tony Dews; Wide receivers – Rob Moore; Tight ends – Luke Steckel; Offensive line – Keith Carter; Assistant offensive line – Mike Sullivan; Assistant offensive line – Jason Houghtaling; Offensive assistant – Erik Frazier; Offensive fellowship – Kylan Butler	Defensive coaches: Defensive coordinator – Shane Bowen; Defensive line – Terrell Williams; Assistant defensive line – Kenechi Udeze; Outside linebackers – Ryan Crow; Inside linebackers – Jim Haslett; Assistant linebackers – Zak Kuhr; Secondary − Anthony Midget; Safeties – Scott Booker; Senior defensive assistant – Jim Schwartz; Special teams coaches: Special teams coordinator – Craig Aukerman; Assistant special teams – Matt Edwards; Strength and conditioning: Strength and conditioning – Frank Piraino; Strength and conditioning assistant – Brian Bell; Strength and conditioning assistant – Mondary Gee

== Final roster ==
2021 Tennessee Titans roster
Quarterbacks (QB): 17 Ryan Tannehill; 5 Logan Woodside; Running backs (RB): 45 Khari Blasingame FB; 7 D'Onta Foreman; 22 Derrick Henry; 40 Dontrell Hilliard; Wide receivers (WR): 11 A. J. Brown; 10 Dez Fitzpatrick; 2 Julio Jones; 81 Racey McMath; 80 Chester Rogers; 15 Nick Westbrook-Ikhine; Tight ends (TE): 86 Anthony Firkser; 83 Ryan Izzo; 87 Geoff Swaim	Offensive linemen (OL): 62 Aaron Brewer G; 64 Nate Davis G; 60 Ben Jones C; 71 Kendall Lamm T; 61 Corey Levin C; 77 Taylor Lewan T; 72 David Quessenberry T; 75 Dillon Radunz T; 76 Rodger Saffold G; Defensive linemen (DL): 96 Denico Autry DE; 90 Naquan Jones NT; 91 Larrell Murchison DE; 95 Kyle Peko NT; 98 Jeffery Simmons DE; 97 Kevin Strong DE; 93 Teair Tart NT	Linebackers (LB): 92 Ola Adeniyi OLB; 55 Jayon Brown ILB; 53 Dylan Cole ILB; 41 Zach Cunningham ILB; 48 Bud Dupree OLB; 49 Nick Dzubnar ILB; 54 Rashaan Evans ILB; 58 Harold Landry OLB; 51 David Long Jr. ILB; 50 Derick Roberson OLB; Defensive backs (DB): 31 Kevin Byard FS; 29 Dane Cruikshank FS; 21 Matthias Farley SS; 26 Kristian Fulton CB; 37 Amani Hooker SS; 35 Chris Jackson CB; 20 Janoris Jenkins CB; 24 Elijah Molden CB; 38 Buster Skrine CB; Special teams (ST): 14 Randy Bullock K; 46 Morgan Cox LS; 6 Brett Kern P	Practice squad: 94 Amani Bledsoe DE; 36 Briean Boddy-Calhoun CB; 25 Jamal Carter SS (PS/I); 69 Christian DiLauro T; 84 Austin Fort TE; 66 Derwin Gray T; 57 Da'Shawn Hand DE; 8 Kevin Hogan QB; 16 Cody Hollister WR; 23 Chris Jones CB; 42 Joseph Jones OLB; 12 Mason Kinsey WR; 28 Jeremy McNichols RB; 52 Daniel Munyer C; 70 Jordan Roos G; 59 Tuzar Skipper OLB; 33 Jordan Wilkins RB; Reserve: 13 Cameron Batson WR (IR); -- B. J. Bello ILB (IR); 44 Tory Carter FB (IR); -- Trevon Coley DE (IR); 32 Darrynton Evans RB (IR); 3 Caleb Farley CB (IR); 4 Sam Ficken K (IR); 89 Tommy Hudson TE (IR); 88 Marcus Johnson WR (IR); -- Kobe Jones OLB (Futures); -- Brandon Kemp T (IR); 30 Greg Mabin CB (COVID-19); -- Briley Moore TE (IR); 85 MyCole Pruitt TE (IR); 56 Monty Rice ILB (IR); 99 Rashad Weaver OLB (IR); -- Chris Williamson CB (Futures); Rookies in italics 53 active, 17 reserve, 16 practice squad (1 exempt)

=== Team captains ===
- Ryan Tannehill (QB)
- Derrick Henry (RB)
- Jeffery Simmons (DT)
- Kevin Byard (FS)
- Brett Kern (P)

== Preseason ==
Week	Date	Opponent	Result	Record	Venue	Recap
1	August 13	at Atlanta Falcons	W 23–3	1–0	Mercedes-Benz Stadium	Recap
2	August 21	at Tampa Bay Buccaneers	W 34–3	2–0	Raymond James Stadium	Recap
3	August 28	Chicago Bears	L 27–24	2–1	Nissan Stadium	Recap

== Regular season ==
=== Schedule ===
The Titans' 2021 schedule was announced on May 12.

Week	Date	Opponent	Result	Record	Venue	Recap
1	September 12	Arizona Cardinals	**L** 13–38	0–1	Nissan Stadium	Recap
2	September 19	at Seattle Seahawks	**W** 33–30 (OT)	1–1	Lumen Field	Recap
3	September 26	**Indianapolis Colts**	**W** 25–16	2–1	Nissan Stadium	Recap
4	October 3	at New York Jets	**L** 24–27 (OT)	2–2	MetLife Stadium	Recap
5	October 10	at **Jacksonville Jaguars**	**W** 37–19	3–2	TIAA Bank Field	Recap
6	October 18	Buffalo Bills	**W** 34–31	4–2	Nissan Stadium	Recap
7	October 24	Kansas City Chiefs	**W** 27–3	5–2	Nissan Stadium	Recap
8	October 31	at **Indianapolis Colts**	**W** 34–31 (OT)	6–2	Lucas Oil Stadium	Recap
9	November 7	at Los Angeles Rams	**W** 28–16	7–2	SoFi Stadium	Recap
10	November 14	New Orleans Saints	**W** 23–21	8–2	Nissan Stadium	Recap
11	November 21	**Houston Texans**	**L** 13–22	8–3	Nissan Stadium	Recap
12	November 28	at New England Patriots	**L** 13–36	8–4	Gillette Stadium	Recap
13	Bye					
14	December 12	**Jacksonville Jaguars**	**W** 20–0	9–4	Nissan Stadium	Recap
15	December 19	at Pittsburgh Steelers	**L** 13–19	9–5	Heinz Field	Recap
16	December 23	San Francisco 49ers	**W** 20–17	10–5	Nissan Stadium	Recap
17	January 2	Miami Dolphins	**W** 34–3	11–5	Nissan Stadium	Recap
18	January 9	at **Houston Texans**	**W** 28–25	12–5	NRG Stadium	Recap

Note: Intra-division opponents are in bold text.

=== Game summaries ===
==== Week 1: vs. Arizona Cardinals ====
Week 1: Arizona Cardinals at Tennessee Titans – Game summary

Quarter	1	2	3	4	Total
**Cardinals**	10	14	14	0	**38**
Titans	0	6	7	0	**13**

at Nissan Stadium, Nashville, Tennessee

- Date: September 12
- Game time: 12:00 p.m. CDT
- Game weather: Sunny, 78 °F (26 °C)
- Game attendance: 67,216
- Referee: Jerome Boger
- TV announcers (CBS): Tom McCarthy and Aaron Taylor
- Recap, Game Book

Game information

**First quarter**

- ARI – Matt Prater 34-yard field goal, 9:26. Cardinals 3–0. **Drive: 8 plays, 45 yards, 4:05.**
- ARI – DeAndre Hopkins 5-yard pass from Kyler Murray (Matt Prater kick), 8:18. Cardinals 10–0. **Drive: 3 plays, 1 yards, 0:19.**

**Second quarter**

- ARI – DeAndre Hopkins 17-yard pass from Kyler Murray (Matt Prater kick), 11:03. Cardinals 17–0. **Drive: 9 plays, 70 yards, 4:32.**
- TEN – Ryan Tannehill 1-yard run (kick failed), 6:54. Cardinals 17–6. **Drive: 11 plays, 75 yards, 4:09.**
- ARI – Kyler Murray 2-yard run (Matt Prater kick), 1:49. Cardinals 24–6. **Drive: 12 plays, 75 yards, 5:06.**

**Third quarter**

- TEN – A. J. Brown 13-yard pass from Ryan Tannehill (Michael Badgley kick), 12:59. Cardinals 24–13. **Drive: 2 plays, 32 yards, 0:47.**
- ARI – Christian Kirk 26-yard pass from Kyler Murray (Matt Prater kick), 10:45. Cardinals 31–13. **Drive: 6 plays, 75 yards, 2:15.**
- ARI – Christian Kirk 11-yard pass from Kyler Murray (Matt Prater kick), 3:11. Cardinals 38–13. **Drive: 4 plays, 33 yards, 2:12.**

**Fourth quarter**

- No scoring plays.

**Top passers**

- ARI – Kyler Murray – 21/32, 289 yards, 4 TD, INT
- TEN – Ryan Tannehill – 21/35, 212 yards, TD, INT

**Top rushers**

- ARI – Chase Edmonds – 12 rushes, 63 yards
- TEN – Derrick Henry – 17 rushes, 58 yards

**Top receivers**

- ARI – DeAndre Hopkins – 6 receptions, 83 yards, 2 TD
- TEN – Chester Rogers – 4 reception, 62 yards

The Titans began 0–1 for the first time since 2018, giving up six sacks on Ryan Tannehill. Cardinals outside linebacker Chandler Jones alone had five sacks, tying a Cardinals franchise record and earning him NFC Defensive Player of the Week. The Cardinals got up 17-0 in the second quarter before Tannehill ran in for a touchdown, however the extra point was missed by new kicker Michael Badgley. The Cardinals continued dominating on both sides of the ball, with Kyler Murray throwing for 289 yards and four touchdowns, and the defense holding Derrick Henry to 58 yards on 17 carries. Badgley would go on to miss a field goal as well, being waived the next day. The Titans only scored one touchdown, a pass from Tannehill to A. J. Brown, in the entire second half. The Titans would lose 38-13.

==== Week 2: at Seattle Seahawks ====
Week 2: Tennessee Titans at Seattle Seahawks – Game summary

Quarter	1	2	3	4	OT	Total
**Titans**	3	6	7	14	3	**33**
Seahawks	3	21	0	6	0	**30**

at Lumen Field, Seattle, Washington

- Date: September 19
- Game time: 3:25 p.m. CDT/1:25 p.m. PDT
- Game weather: Cloudy, 61 °F (16 °C)
- Game attendance: 68,585
- Referee: John Hussey
- TV announcers (CBS): Andrew Catalon, James Lofton and Sherree Burruss
- Recap, Game Book

Game information

**First quarter**

- SEA – Jason Myers 31-yard field goal, 9:25. Seahawks 3–0. **Drive: 5 plays, 57 yards, 1:58.**
- TEN – Randy Bullock 33-yard field goal, 2:45. Tied 3–3. **Drive: 13 plays, 70 yards, 6:40.**

**Second quarter**

- TEN – Randy Bullock 30-yard field goal, 8:18. Titans 6–3. **Drive: 7 plays, 68 yards, 4:29.**
- SEA – Tyler Lockett 63-yard pass from Russell Wilson (Jason Myers kick), 6:34. Seahawks 10–6. **Drive: 3 plays, 83 yards, 1:44.**
- SEA – Chris Carson 2-yard run (Jason Myers kick), 5:20. Seahawks 17–6. **Drive: 2 plays, 6 yards, 0:28.**
- TEN – Randy Bullock 24-yard field goal, 1:05. Seahawks 17–9. **Drive: 8 plays, 63 yards, 4:15.**
- SEA – Chris Carson 1-yard run (Jason Myers kick), 0:17. Seahawks 24–9. **Drive: 7 plays, 75 yards, 0:48.**

**Third quarter**

- TEN – Derrick Henry 9-yard run (Randy Bullock kick), 10:37. Seahawks 24–16. **Drive: 8 plays, 80 yards, 4:23.**

**Fourth quarter**

- SEA – Freddie Swain 68-yard pass from Russell Wilson (kick failed), 13:06. Seahawks 30–16. **Drive: 3 plays, 66 yards, 1:54.**
- TEN – Derrick Henry 60-yard run (Randy Bullock kick), 12:17. Seahawks 30–23. **Drive: 2 plays, 75 yards, 0:49.**
- TEN – Derrick Henry 1-yard run (Randy Bullock kick), 0:29. Tied 30–30. **Drive: 12 plays, 68 yards, 3:44.**

**Overtime**

- TEN – Randy Bullock 36-yard field goal, 4:45. Titans 33–30. **Drive: 5 plays, 21 yards, 2:34.**

**Top passers**

- TEN – Ryan Tannehill – 27/40, 347 yards
- SEA – Russell Wilson – 22/31, 343 yards, 2 TD

**Top rushers**

- TEN – Derrick Henry – 35 rushes, 182 yards, 3 TD
- SEA – Chris Carson – 13 rushes, 31 yards, 2 TD

**Top receivers**

- TEN – Julio Jones – 6 receptions, 128 yards
- SEA – Tyler Lockett – 8 receptions, 178 yards, TD

The Titans started the game slow, down 24-9 in the third quarter and 30-16 in the fourth. However they came back to tie, with Derrick Henry scoring on a one-yard touchdown run with 29 seconds left, making it 30-30 and forcing the game into overtime. New kicker Randy Bullock, kicked a game-winning 36-yard field goal in overtime to win 33-30. Henry rushed 35 times for 182 yards and two touchdowns, including a 60-yard TD in the fourth quarter. Henry would also catch a career high six receptions for 55 yards, winning AFC Offensive Player of the Week and FedEx Ground Player of the Week for his performance. Wide receiver Julio Jones caught six catches for 128 yards in his first 100-yard game with the Titans. Bullock made four of his five kicks, and would remain the Titans kicker for the rest of the season.

==== Week 3: vs. Indianapolis Colts ====
Week 3: Indianapolis Colts at Tennessee Titans – Game summary

Quarter	1	2	3	4	Total
Colts	0	10	3	3	**16**
**Titans**	7	7	0	11	**25**

at Nissan Stadium, Nashville, Tennessee

- Date: September 26
- Game time: 12:00 p.m. CDT
- Game weather: Sunny, 72 °F (22 °C)
- Game attendance: 67,914
- Referee: Bill Vinovich
- TV announcers (CBS): Andrew Catalon, James Lofton and Michael Grady
- Recap, Game Book

Game information

**First quarter**

- TEN – Chester Rogers 6-yard pass from Ryan Tannehill (Randy Bullock kick), 6:34. Titans 7–0. **Drive: 11 plays, 71 yards, 5:34.**

**Second quarter**

- IND – Nyheim Hines 9-yard run (Rodrigo Blankenship kick), 10:19. Tied 7–7. **Drive: 9 plays, 53 yards, 4:52.**
- TEN – Nick Westbrook-Ikhine 18-yard pass from Ryan Tannehill (Randy Bullock kick), 5:56. Titans 14–7. **Drive: 8 plays, 75 yards, 4:23.**
- IND – Rodrigo Blankenship 43-yard field goal, 0:00. Titans 14–10. **Drive: 4 plays, 22 yards, 0:49.**

**Third quarter**

- IND – Rodrigo Blankenship 28-yard field goal, 6:26. Titans 14–13. **Drive: 17 plays, 66 yards, 8:34.**

**Fourth quarter**

- TEN – Jeremy McNichols 10-yard pass from Ryan Tannehill (Derrick Henry run), 12:56. Titans 22–13. **Drive: 5 plays, 59 yards, 2:24.**
- IND – Rodrigo Blankenship 24-yard field goal, 10:20. Titans 22–16. **Drive: 7 plays, 70 yards, 2:36.**
- TEN – Randy Bullock 32-yard field goal, 2:58. Titans 25–16. **Drive: 14 plays, 67 yards, 7:22.**

**Top passers**

- IND – Carson Wentz – 19/37, 194 yards
- TEN – Ryan Tannehill – 18/27, 197 yards, 3 TD, 2 INT

**Top rushers**

- IND – Jonathan Taylor – 10 rushes, 64 yards
- TEN – Derrick Henry – 28 rushes, 113 yards

**Top receivers**

- IND – Michael Pittman Jr. – 6 receptions, 68 yards
- TEN – Nick Westbrook-Ikhine – 4 receptions, 53 yards, TD

The Titans continued their season by beating the Colts 25-16, dropping the Colts to their first 0-3 start since 2011. The Titans offense turned the ball over three times, however the Titans defense only allowed the Colts to score one touchdown in the game and force them to try four field goal attempts. The Titans defense also held the Colts to just 25% on third down conversions and sacked Carson Wentz two times with 10 quarterback hits. Ryan Tannehill completed 18-of-27 passes for 197 yards, while also rushing for 56 yards on five carries. Derrick Henry rushed 28 times for 113 yards, once again winning the FedEx Ground Player of the Week. The Titans suffered several injuries in the game, with LB Bud Dupree already sidelined prior, WR A. J. Brown exiting the game in the first quarter, WR Julio Jones being unable to play in the final stages, and losing CB Kristian Fulton for a stretch.

==== Week 4: at New York Jets ====
Week 4: Tennessee Titans at New York Jets – Game summary

Quarter	1	2	3	4	OT	Total
Titans	3	6	0	15	0	**24**
**Jets**	0	7	3	14	3	**27**

at MetLife Stadium, East Rutherford, New Jersey

- Date: October 3
- Game time: 1:00 p.m. EDT/12:00 p.m. CDT
- Game weather: Mostly sunny, 78 °F (26 °C)
- Game attendance: 70,232
- Referee: Adrian Hill
- TV announcers (CBS): Greg Gumbel, Adam Archuleta and AJ Ross
- Recap, Game Book

Game information

**First quarter**

- TEN – Randy Bullock 44-yard field goal, 7:06. Titans 3–0. **Drive: 12 plays, 31 yards, 6:10.**

**Second quarter**

- TEN – Randy Bullock 46-yard field goal, 12:53. Titans 6–0. **Drive: 11 plays, 56 yards, 6:10.**
- TEN – Randy Bullock 36-yard field goal, 10:29. Titans 9–0. **Drive: 5 plays, 14 yards, 1:46.**
- NYJ – Michael Carter 2-yard run (Matt Ammendola kick), 4:49. Titans 9–7. **Drive: 11 plays, 75 yards, 5:40.**

**Third quarter**

- NYJ – Matt Ammendola 27-yard field goal, 0:19. Jets 10–9. **Drive: 8 plays, 78 yards, 3:17.**

**Fourth quarter**

- TEN – Derrick Henry 1-yard run (Ryan Tannehill–MyCole Pruitt pass), 13:14. Titans 17–10. **Drive: 6 plays, 75 yards, 2:05.**
- NYJ – Jamison Crowder 3-yard pass from Zach Wilson (Matt Ammendola kick), 11:30. Tied 17–17. **Drive: 4 plays, 77 yards, 1:44.**
- NYJ – Corey Davis 53-yard pass from Zach Wilson (Matt Ammendola kick), 9:06. Jets 24–17. **Drive: 1 play, 53 yards, 0:10.**
- TEN – Cameron Batson 2-yard pass from Ryan Tannehill (Randy Bullock kick), 0:16. Tied 24–24. **Drive: 11 plays, 74 yards, 1:53.**

**Overtime**

- NYJ – Matt Ammendola 22-yard field goal, 4:31. Jets 27–24. **Drive: 13 plays, 71 yards, 5:29.**

**Top passers**

- TEN – Ryan Tannehill – 30/49, 298 yards, TD
- NYJ – Zach Wilson – 21/34, 297 yards, 2 TD, INT

**Top rushers**

- TEN – Derrick Henry – 33 rushes, 157 yards, TD
- NYJ – Michael Carter – 13 rushes, 38 yards, TD

**Top receivers**

- TEN – Jeremy McNichols – 8 receptions, 74 yards
- NYJ – Corey Davis – 4 receptions, 111 yards, TD

The game lead tied or changed five times as Ryan Tannehill, overcoming seven sacks, completed a two-yard score to Cameron Batson that forced overtime. After a Matt Ammendola field goal in overtime Randy Bullock missed a 49-yard attempt. It was Tennessee's fifth loss in the last nine meetings with the Jets and first overtime game against New York since a 31-28 loss in 1980.

==== Week 5: at Jacksonville Jaguars ====
Week 5: Tennessee Titans at Jacksonville Jaguars – Game summary

Quarter	1	2	3	4	Total
**Titans**	7	17	7	6	**37**
Jaguars	6	7	0	6	**19**

at TIAA Bank Field, Jacksonville, Florida

- Date: October 10
- Game time: 1:00 p.m. EDT/12:00 p.m. CDT
- Game weather: Partly cloudy, 78 °F (26 °C)
- Game attendance: 58,282
- Referee: Alex Kemp
- TV announcers (CBS): Tom McCarthy and Tiki Barber
- Recap, Game Book

Game information

**First quarter**

- TEN – Kevin Byard 30–yard fumble return (Randy Bullock kick), 14:00. Titans 7–0.
- JAX – James Robinson 1-yard run (kick failed, hit right upright), 11:21. Titans 7–6. **Drive: 5 plays, 75 yards, 2:39.**

**Second quarter**

- TEN – Derrick Henry 1-yard run (Randy Bullock kick), 14:56. Titans 14–6. **Drive: 11 plays, 79 yards, 4:50.**
- JAX – Jacob Hollister 1-yard pass from Trevor Lawrence (Matthew Wright kick), 9:55. Titans 14–13. **Drive: 9 plays, 70 yards, 5:01.**
- TEN – MyCole Pruitt 14-yard pass from Ryan Tannehill (Randy Bullock kick), 5:49. Titans 21–13. **Drive: 8 plays, 75 yards, 4:06.**
- TEN – Randy Bullock 34-yard field goal, 0:31. Titans 24–13. **Drive: 7 plays, 41 yards, 1:51.**

**Third quarter**

- TEN – Derrick Henry 9-yard run (Randy Bullock kick), 9:48. Titans 31–13. **Drive: 11 plays, 75 yards, 5:12.**

**Fourth quarter**

- JAX – Trevor Lawrence 4-yard run (pass failed), 13:50. Titans 31–19. **Drive: 10 plays, 80 yards, 4:46.**
- TEN – Derrick Henry 10-yard run (kick failed, wide right), 1:54. Titans 37–19. **Drive: 5 plays, 39 yards, 2:02.**

**Top passers**

- TEN – Ryan Tannehill – 14/22, 197 yards, TD
- JAX – Trevor Lawrence – 23/33, 273 yards, TD, INT

**Top rushers**

- TEN – Derrick Henry – 29 rushes, 130 yards, 3 TD
- JAX – James Robinson – 18 rushes, 149 yards, TD

**Top receivers**

- TEN – Marcus Johnson – 3 receptions, 52 yards
- JAX – Dan Arnold – 6 receptions, 64 yards

==== Week 6: vs. Buffalo Bills ====
Week 6: Buffalo Bills at Tennessee Titans – Game summary

Quarter	1	2	3	4	Total
Bills	3	17	11	0	**31**
**Titans**	0	17	7	10	**34**

at Nissan Stadium, Nashville, Tennessee

- Date: October 18
- Game time: 7:15 p.m. CDT
- Game weather: Clear, 65 °F (18 °C)
- Game attendance: 69,419
- Referee: Clete Blakeman
- TV announcers (ESPN): Steve Levy, Brian Griese, Louis Riddick, Lisa Salters and John Parry
- Recap, Game Book

Game information

**First quarter**

- BUF – Tyler Bass 24-yard field goal, 6:07. Bills 3–0. **Drive: 13 plays, 74 yards, 6:19.**

**Second quarter**

- BUF – Tyler Bass 28-yard field goal, 11:36. Bills 6–0. **Drive: 10 plays, 38 yards, 4:27.**
- TEN – Derrick Henry 76-yard run (Randy Bullock kick), 11:20. Titans 7–6. **Drive: 1 play, 76 yards, 0:16.**
- BUF – Stefon Diggs 14-yard pass from Josh Allen (Tyler Bass kick), 7:54. Bills 13–7. **Drive: 7 plays, 72 yards, 3:26.**
- TEN – Randy Bullock 43-yard field goal, 5:04. Bills 13–10. **Drive: 7 plays, 54 yards, 2:50.**
- TEN – Ryan Tannehill 4-yard run (Randy Bullock kick), 4:23. Titans 17–13. **Drive: 2 plays, 11 yards, 0:31.**
- BUF – Cole Beasley 29-yard pass from Josh Allen (Tyler Bass kick), 0:40. Bills 20–17. **Drive: 10 plays, 75 yards, 3:43.**

**Third quarter**

- BUF – Tyler Bass 52-yard field goal, 10:49. Bills 23–17. **Drive: 9 plays, 48 yards, 4:11.**
- TEN – Derrick Henry 3-yard run (Randy Bullock kick), 4:23. Titans 24–23. **Drive: 12 plays, 67 yards, 6:26.**
- BUF – Tommy Sweeney 1-yard pass from Josh Allen (Dawson Knox-Josh Allen pass), 0:27. Bills 31–24. **Drive: 9 plays, 75 yards, 3:56.**

**Fourth quarter**

- TEN – Randy Bullock 38-yard field goal, 9:45. Bills 31–27. **Drive: 9 plays, 45 yards, 5:42.**
- TEN – Derrick Henry 13-yard run (Randy Bullock kick), 3:05. Titans 34–31. **Drive: 8 plays, 70 yards, 4:56.**

**Top passers**

- BUF – Josh Allen – 35/47, 353 yards, 3 TD, INT
- TEN – Ryan Tannehill – 18/29, 216 yards, INT

**Top rushers**

- BUF – Devin Singletary – 5 rushes, 27 yards
- TEN – Derrick Henry – 20 rushes, 143 yards, 3 TD

**Top receivers**

- BUF – Emmanuel Sanders – 5 receptions, 91 yards
- TEN – A. J. Brown – 7 receptions, 91 yards

The Titans edged the Bills 34–31, winning on a fourth down stop of Bills quarterback Josh Allen at their 3-yard line in the final thirty seconds. The game lead changed seven times as Derrick Henry rushed for three touchdowns and 143 yards; he also caught two passes for thirteen yards. Ryan Tannehill ran in a touchdown and completed eighteen passes for 216 yards; he completed fourteen of his last seventeen passes after starting with just four of his first twelve.

==== Week 7: vs. Kansas City Chiefs ====
Week 7: Kansas City Chiefs at Tennessee Titans – Game summary

Quarter	1	2	3	4	Total
Chiefs	0	0	3	0	**3**
**Titans**	14	13	0	0	**27**

at Nissan Stadium, Nashville, Tennessee

- Date: October 24
- Game time: 12:00 p.m. CDT
- Game weather: Cloudy, 70 °F (21 °C)
- Game attendance: 69,484
- Referee: Brad Allen
- TV announcers (CBS): Ian Eagle, Charles Davis and Evan Washburn
- Recap, Game Book

Game information

**First quarter**

- TEN – MyCole Pruitt 5-yard pass from Derrick Henry (Randy Bullock kick), 10:50. Titans 7–0. **Drive: 8 plays, 75 yards, 4:10.**
- TEN – A. J. Brown 24-yard pass from Ryan Tannehill (Randy Bullock kick), 0:42. Titans 14–0. **Drive: 9 plays, 97 yards, 5:34.**

**Second quarter**

- TEN – Randy Bullock 34-yard field goal, 8:07. Titans 17–0. **Drive: 12 plays, 60 yards, 6:39.**
- TEN – Ryan Tannehill 2-yard run (Randy Bullock kick), 2:48. Titans 24–0. **Drive: 8 plays, 46 yards, 5:08.**
- TEN – Randy Bullock 51-yard field goal, 0:03. Titans 27–0. **Drive: 8 plays, 18 yards, 1:45.**

**Third quarter**

- KC – Harrison Butker 42-yard field goal, 11:00. Titans 27–3. **Drive: 10 plays, 51 yards, 4:00.**

**Fourth quarter**

- No scoring plays.

**Top passers**

- KC – Patrick Mahomes – 20/35, 206 yards, INT
- TEN – Ryan Tannehill – 21/27, 270 yards, TD, INT

**Top rushers**

- KC – Patrick Mahomes – 6 rushes, 35 yards
- TEN – Derrick Henry – 29 rushes, 86 yards

**Top receivers**

- KC – Byron Pringle – 5 receptions, 73 yards
- TEN – A. J. Brown – 8 receptions, 133 yards, TD

This was the 55th career meeting between the two teams since founders Bud Adams and Lamar Hunt co-founded the American Football League but only the fifth meeting in Tennessee. It was also the twelfth meeting since they were the Houston Oilers. With the win the Titans moved to a 9-2 lifetime record against Chiefs coach Andy Reid.

==== Week 8: at Indianapolis Colts ====
Week 8: Tennessee Titans at Indianapolis Colts – Game summary

Quarter	1	2	3	4	OT	Total
**Titans**	0	14	7	10	3	**34**
Colts	14	3	7	7	0	**31**

at Lucas Oil Stadium, Indianapolis, Indiana

- Date: October 31
- Game time: 1:00 p.m. EDT/12:00 p.m. CDT
- Game weather: Sunny, 56 °F (13 °C) (retractable roof open)
- Game attendance: 59,175
- Referee: Carl Cheffers
- TV announcers (CBS): Spero Dedes and Jay Feely
- Recap, Game Book

Game information

**First quarter**

- IND – Michael Pittman Jr. 2-yard pass from Carson Wentz (Michael Badgley kick), 8:41. Colts 7–0. **Drive: 14 plays, 82 yards, 6:19.**
- IND – Michael Pittman Jr. 7-yard pass from Carson Wentz (Michael Badgley kick), 7:44. Colts 14–0. **Drive: 1 play, 7 yards, 0:05.**

**Second quarter**

- TEN – Geoff Swaim 6-yard pass from Ryan Tannehill (Randy Bullock kick), 12:07. Colts 14–7. **Drive: 11 plays, 60 yards, 5:48.**
- TEN – A. J. Brown 57-yard pass from Ryan Tannehill (Randy Bullock kick), 4:13. Tied 14–14. **Drive: 1 play, 57 yards, 0:11.**
- IND – Michael Badgley 34-yard field goal, 0:00. Colts 17–14. **Drive: 13 plays, 59 yards, 4:13.**

**Third quarter**

- TEN – Nick Westbrook-Ikhine 5-yard pass from Ryan Tannehill (Randy Bullock kick), 7:42. Titans 21–17. **Drive: 14 plays, 75 yards, 7:18.**
- IND – Jack Doyle 5-yard pass from Carson Wentz (Michael Badgley kick), 1:21. Colts 24–21. **Drive: 4 plays, 57 yards, 2:21.**

**Fourth quarter**

- TEN – Randy Bullock 46-yard field goal, 11:15. Tied 24–24. **Drive: 10 plays, 47 yards, 5:06.**
- TEN – Elijah Molden 2-yard interception return (Randy Bullock kick), 1:26. Titans 31–24.
- IND – Jonathan Taylor 1-yard run (Michael Badgley kick), 0:22. Tied 31–31. **Drive: 5 plays, 75 yards, 1:04.**

**Overtime**

- TEN – Randy Bullock 44-yard field goal, 4:03. Titans 34–31. **Drive: 4 plays, 5 yards, 1:45.**

**Top passers**

- TEN – Ryan Tannehill – 23/33, 265 yards, 3 TD, 2 INT
- IND – Carson Wentz – 27/51, 231 yards, 3 TD, 2 INT

**Top rushers**

- TEN – Derrick Henry – 28 rushes, 68 yards
- IND – Jonathan Taylor – 16 rushes, 70 yards, TD

**Top receivers**

- TEN – A.J. Brown – 10 receptions, 155 yards, TD
- IND – Michael Pittman Jr. – 10 receptions, 86 yards, 2 TD

The Titans rallied to the overtime win and only their third sweep of the Colts since formation of the AFC South. But running back Derrick Henry was lost for the rest of the regular season with a foot injury that necessitated surgery and also the signing of Adrian Peterson.

==== Week 9: at Los Angeles Rams ====
Week 9: Tennessee Titans at Los Angeles Rams – Game summary

Quarter	1	2	3	4	Total
**Titans**	0	21	0	7	**28**
Rams	3	0	3	10	**16**

at SoFi Stadium, Inglewood, California

- Date: November 7
- Game time: 7:20 p.m. CST/5:20 p.m. PST
- Game weather: Cloudy, 59 °F (15 °C)
- Game attendance: 71,785
- Referee: Brad Rogers
- TV announcers (NBC): Al Michaels, Cris Collinsworth and Michele Tafoya
- Recap, Game Book

Game information

**First quarter**

- LAR – Matt Gay 34-yard field goal, 3:46. Rams 3–0. **Drive: 10 plays, 49 yards, 4:47.**

**Second quarter**

- TEN – Geoff Swaim 2-yard pass from Ryan Tannehill (Randy Bullock kick), 12:21. Titans 7–3. **Drive: 1 play, 2 yards, 0:04.**
- TEN – Kevin Byard 24-yard interception return (Randy Bullock kick), 12:10. Titans 14–3.
- TEN – Ryan Tannehill 1-yard run (Randy Bullock kick), 2:10. Titans 21–3. **Drive: 14 plays, 64 yards, 7:39.**

**Third quarter**

- LAR – Matt Gay 22-yard field goal, 8:15. Titans 21–6. **Drive: 11 plays, 84 yards, 4:15.**

**Fourth quarter**

- LAR – Matt Gay 54-yard field goal, 14:55. Titans 21–9. **Drive: 11 plays, 35 yards, 5:39.**
- TEN – Adrian Peterson 1-yard run (Randy Bullock kick), 3:00. Titans 28–9. **Drive: 7 plays, 59 yards, 3:39.**
- LAR – Sony Michel 3-yard pass from Matthew Stafford (Matt Gay kick), 0:24. Titans 28–16. **Drive: 14 plays, 75 yards, 2:36.**

**Top passers**

- TEN – Ryan Tannehill – 19/27, 143 yards, TD, INT
- LAR – Matthew Stafford – 31/48, 294 yards, TD, 2 INT

**Top rushers**

- TEN – D'Onta Foreman – 5 rushes, 29 yards
- LAR – Darrell Henderson – 11 rushes, 55 yards

**Top receivers**

- TEN – A. J. Brown – 5 receptions, 42 yards
- LAR – Robert Woods – 7 receptions, 98 yards

In their first game without Henry, the Titans accounted for just 194 total yards on offense, but won due to a strong performance by their defense, which set up several short fields and intercepted Rams quarterback Matthew Stafford on two consecutive plays in the second quarter, with the second pick being returned for a touchdown.

==== Week 10: vs. New Orleans Saints ====
Week 10: New Orleans Saints at Tennessee Titans – Game summary

Quarter	1	2	3	4	Total
Saints	0	6	6	9	**21**
**Titans**	3	10	7	3	**23**

at Nissan Stadium, Nashville, Tennessee

- Date: November 14
- Game time: 12:00 p.m. CST
- Game weather: Cloudy, 55 °F (13 °C)
- Game attendance: 69,414
- Referee: Jerome Boger
- TV announcers (CBS): Kevin Harlan, Trent Green and Melanie Collins
- Recap, GameBook

Game information

**First quarter**

- TEN – Randy Bullock 28-yard field goal, 0:52. Titans 3–0. **Drive: 8 plays, 70 yards, 3:38.**

**Second quarter**

- NO – Tre'Quan Smith 11-yard pass from Trevor Siemian (kick failed), 12:59. Saints 6–3. **Drive: 6 plays, 75 yards, 2:53.**
- TEN – Randy Bullock 36-yard field goal, 7:44. Tied 6–6. **Drive: 10 plays, 59 yards, 5:15.**
- TEN – Ryan Tannehill 1-yard run (Randy Bullock kick), 1:38. Titans 13–6. **Drive: 8 plays, 56 yards, 3:23.**

**Third quarter**

- TEN – MyCole Pruitt 2-yard pass from Ryan Tannehill (Randy Bullock kick), 12:02. Titans 20–6. **Drive: 5 plays, 19 yards, 2:51.**
- NO – Mark Ingram II 13-yard run (kick failed), 3:54. Titans 20–12. **Drive: 11 plays, 87 yards, 5:11.**

**Fourth quarter**

- TEN – Randy Bullock 36-yard field goal, 10:01. Titans 23–12. **Drive: 11 plays, 55 yards, 6:23.**
- NO – Brian Johnson 20-yard field goal, 5:33. Titans 23–15. **Drive: 8 plays, 67 yards, 4:28.**
- NO – Marquez Callaway 15-yard pass from Trevor Siemian (pass failed), 1:16. Titans 23–21. **Drive: 7 plays, 71 yards, 2:18.**

**Top passers**

- NO – Trevor Siemian – 19/34, 298 yards, 2 TD
- TEN – Ryan Tannehill – 19/27, 213 yards, TD

**Top rushers**

- NO – Mark Ingram II – 14 rushes, 47 yards, TD
- TEN – D'Onta Foreman – 11 rushes, 30 yards

**Top receivers**

- NO – Deonte Harris – 3 receptions, 84 yards
- TEN – Marcus Johnson – 5 receptions, 100 yards

A Saints red zone interception was negated by a questionable roughing the passer call, which set up the Titans with 1st & Goal at the one yard line, resulting in a touchdown for Tennessee

==== Week 11: vs. Houston Texans ====
Week 11: Houston Texans at Tennessee Titans – Game summary

Quarter	1	2	3	4	Total
**Texans**	3	9	7	3	**22**
Titans	0	0	6	7	**13**

at Nissan Stadium, Nashville, Tennessee

- Date: November 21
- Game time: 12:00 p.m. CST
- Game weather: Cloudy, 56 °F (13 °C)
- Game attendance: 67,395
- Referee: Tony Corrente
- TV announcers (CBS): Andrew Catalon, James Lofton, and Sherree Burruss
- Recap, Game Book

Game information

**First quarter**

- HOU – Kaʻimi Fairbairn 43-yard field goal, 4:04. Texans 3–0. **Drive: 14 plays, 62 yards, 6:58.**

**Second quarter**

- HOU – Kaʻimi Fairbairn 24-yard field goal, 13:35. Texans 6–0. **Drive: 4 plays, 0 yards, 1:25.**
- HOU – Tyrod Taylor 7-yard run (kick failed), 7:43. Texans 12–0. **Drive: 9 plays, 76 yards, 4:39.**

**Third quarter**

- HOU – Tyrod Taylor 5-yard run (Kaʻimi Fairbairn kick), 7:00. Texans 19–0. **Drive: 3 plays, 5 yards, 0:36.**
- TEN – Dez Fitzpatrick 18-yard pass from Ryan Tannehill (kick failed), 2:24. Texans 19–6. **Drive: 13 plays, 78 yards, 4:36.**

**Fourth quarter**

- TEN – Anthony Firkser fumble recovery in end zone (Randy Bullock kick), 7:47. Texans 19–13. **Drive: 6 plays, 36 yards, 2:15.**
- HOU – Kaʻimi Fairbairn 37-yard field goal, 3:26. Texans 22–13. **Drive: 4 plays, -4 yards, 0:16.**

**Top passers**

- HOU – Tyrod Taylor – 14/24, 107 yards
- TEN – Ryan Tannehill – 35/52, 323 yards, TD, 4 INT

**Top rushers**

- HOU – Rex Burkhead – 18 rushes, 40 yards
- TEN – Adrian Peterson – 9 rushes, 40 yards

**Top receivers**

- HOU – Chris Conley – 4 receptions, 37 yards
- TEN – Nick Westbrook-Ikhine – 7 receptions, 107 yards

==== Week 12: at New England Patriots ====
Week 12: Tennessee Titans at New England Patriots – Game summary

Quarter	1	2	3	4	Total
Titans	0	13	0	0	**13**
**Patriots**	7	9	10	10	**36**

at Gillette Stadium, Foxborough, Massachusetts

- Date: November 28
- Game time: 1:00 p.m. EST/12:00 p.m. CST
- Game weather: Cloudy, 37 °F (3 °C)
- Game attendance: 65,878
- Referee: Alex Kemp
- TV announcers (CBS): Ian Eagle, Charles Davis and Evan Washburn
- Recap, Game Book

Game information

**First quarter**

- NE – Kendrick Bourne 4-yard pass from Mac Jones (Nick Folk kick), 7:37. Patriots 7–0. **Drive: 9 plays, 37 yards, 4:46.**

**Second quarter**

- TEN – Nick Westbrook-Ikhine 1-yard pass from Ryan Tannehill (kick failed), 14:28. Patriots 7–6. **Drive: 14 plays, 74 yards, 8:09.**
- NE – Nick Folk 22-yard field goal, 9:50. Patriots 10–6. **Drive: 8 plays, 75 yards, 4:38.**
- NE – Nick Folk 37-yard field goal, 3:04. Patriots 13–6. **Drive: 6 plays, 47 yards, 2:57.**
- NE – Nick Folk 44-yard field goal, 0:58. Patriots 16–6. **Drive: 6 plays, 42 yards, 0:53.**
- TEN – Dontrell Hilliard 68-yard run (Randy Bullock kick), 0:37. Patriots 16–13. **Drive: 3 plays, 75 yards, 0:21.**

**Third quarter**

- NE – Nick Folk 28-yard field goal, 11:13. Patriots 19–13. **Drive: 8 plays, 39 yards, 3:47.**
- NE – Kendrick Bourne 41-yard pass from Mac Jones (Nick Folk kick), 5:01. Patriots 26–13. **Drive: 4 plays, 56 yards, 1:43.**

**Fourth quarter**

- NE – Nick Folk 52-yard field goal, 6:09. Patriots 29–13. **Drive: 10 plays, 46 yards, 5:50.**
- NE – Damien Harris 14-yard run (Nick Folk kick), 4:38. Patriots 36–13. **Drive: 2 plays, 21 yards, 0:48.**

**Top passers**

- TEN – Ryan Tannehill – 11/21, 93 yards, TD, INT
- NE – Mac Jones – 23/32, 310 yards, 2 TD

**Top rushers**

- TEN – Dontrell Hilliard – 12 rushes, 131 yards, TD
- NE – Rhamondre Stevenson – 9 rushes, 46 yards

**Top receivers**

- TEN – Nick Westbrook-Ikhine – 2 receptions, 25 yards, TD
- NE – Jakobi Meyers – 5 receptions, 98 yards

==== Week 14: vs. Jacksonville Jaguars ====
Week 14: Jacksonville Jaguars at Tennessee Titans – Game summary

Quarter	1	2	3	4	Total
Jaguars	0	0	0	0	**0**
**Titans**	7	3	7	3	**20**

at Nissan Stadium, Nashville, Tennessee

- Date: December 12
- Game time: 12:00 p.m. CST
- Game weather: Sunny, 44 °F (7 °C)
- Game attendance: 67,808
- Referee: Bill Vinovich
- TV announcers (CBS): Spero Dedes and Jay Feely
- Recap, Game Book

Game information

**First quarter**

- TEN – D'Onta Foreman 5-yard run (Randy Bullock kick), 10:03. Titans 7–0. **Drive: 10 plays, 74 yards, 4:57.**

**Second quarter**

- TEN – Randy Bullock 44-yard field goal, 3:10. Titans 10–0. **Drive: 15 plays, 62 yards, 8:04.**

**Third quarter**

- TEN – Ryan Tannehill 5-yard run (Randy Bullock kick), 2:51. Titans 17–0. **Drive: 11 plays, 69 yards, 5:10.**

**Fourth quarter**

- TEN – Randy Bullock 29-yard field goal, 2:20. Titans 20–0. **Drive: 4 plays, 3 yards, 1:12.**

**Top passers**

- JAX – Trevor Lawrence – 24/40, 221 yards, 4 INT
- TEN – Ryan Tannehill – 20/31, 191 yards

**Top rushers**

- JAX – James Robinson – 6 rushes, 4 yards
- TEN – D'Onta Foreman – 13 rushes, 47 yards, TD

**Top receivers**

- JAX – Marvin Jones – 6 receptions, 70 yards
- TEN – Geoff Swaim – 3 receptions, 45 yards

==== Week 15: at Pittsburgh Steelers ====
Week 15: Tennessee Titans at Pittsburgh Steelers – Game summary

Quarter	1	2	3	4	Total
Titans	10	3	0	0	**13**
**Steelers**	0	3	7	9	**19**

at Heinz Field, Pittsburgh, Pennsylvania

- Date: December 19
- Game time: 1:00 p.m. EST/12:00 p.m. CST
- Game weather: Cloudy, 34 °F (1 °C)
- Game attendance: 59,521
- Referee: Brad Rogers
- TV announcers (CBS): Jim Nantz, Tony Romo and Tracy Wolfson
- Recap, Game Book

Game information

**First quarter**

- TEN – Ryan Tannehill 1-yard run (Randy Bullock kick), 7:41. Titans 7–0. **Drive: 6 plays, 25 yards, 2:29.**
- TEN – Randy Bullock 26-yard field goal, 1:13. Titans 10–0. **Drive: 11 plays, 45 yards, 4:54.**

**Second quarter**

- PIT – Chris Boswell 36-yard field goal, 10:35. Titans 10–3. **Drive: 5 plays, 18 yards, 2:11.**
- TEN – Randy Bullock 32-yard field goal, 0:18. Titans 13–3. **Drive: 19 plays, 64 yards, 10:17.**

**Third quarter**

- PIT – Ben Roethlisberger 1-yard run (Chris Boswell kick), 3:08. Titans 13–10. **Drive: 8 plays, 63 yards, 3:59.**

**Fourth quarter**

- PIT – Chris Boswell 28-yard field goal, 13:24. Tied 13–13. **Drive: 7 plays, 31 yards, 2:26.**
- PIT – Chris Boswell 46-yard field goal, 7:20. Steelers 16–13. **Drive: 4 plays, 4 yards, 1:56.**
- PIT – Chris Boswell 48-yard field goal, 4:29. Steelers 19–13. **Drive: 4 plays, 5 yards, 2:07.**

**Top passers**

- TEN – Ryan Tannehill – 23/32, 153 yards, INT
- PIT – Ben Roethlisberger – 16/25, 148 yards

**Top rushers**

- TEN – D'Onta Foreman – 22 rushes, 108 yards
- PIT – Najee Harris – 12 rushes, 18 yards

**Top receivers**

- TEN – Nick Westbrook-Ikhine – 4 receptions, 32 yards
- PIT – Diontae Johnson – 5 receptions, 38 yards

==== Week 16: vs. San Francisco 49ers ====
Week 16: San Francisco 49ers at Tennessee Titans – Game summary

Quarter	1	2	3	4	Total
49ers	7	3	0	7	**17**
**Titans**	0	0	10	10	**20**

at Nissan Stadium, Nashville, Tennessee

- Date: December 23
- Game time: 7:20 p.m. CST
- Game weather: Clear, 54 °F (12 °C)
- Game attendance: 69,361
- Referee: Shawn Hochuli
- TV announcers (NFLN): Kevin Burkhardt, Greg Olsen, Pam Oliver and Kristina Pink
- Recap, Game Book

Game information

**First quarter**

- SF – Jeff Wilson Jr. 1-yard run (Robbie Gould kick) 9:57. 49ers 7–0. **Drive: 9 plays, 75 yards, 5:03.**

**Second quarter**

- SF – Robbie Gould 48-yard field goal, 8:31. 49ers 10–0. **Drive: 11 plays, 33 yards, 6:19.**

**Third quarter**

- TEN – Randy Bullock 38-yard field goal, 8:45. 49ers 10–3. **Drive: 13 plays, 55 yards, 6:15.**
- TEN – D'Onta Foreman 3-yard run (Randy Bullock kick), 7:13. Tied 10–10. **Drive: 4 plays, 18 yards, 1:23.**

**Fourth quarter**

- TEN – A. J. Brown 18-yard pass from Ryan Tannehill (Randy Bullock kick), 13:02. Titans 17–10. **Drive: 7 plays, 59 yards, 3:51.**
- SF – Brandon Aiyuk 2-yard pass from Jimmy Garoppolo (Robbie Gould kick), 2:20. Tied 17–17. **Drive: 8 plays, 95 yards, 2:58.**
- TEN – Randy Bullock 44-yard field goal, 0:04. Titans 20–17. **Drive: 8 plays, 49 yards, 2:16.**

**Top passers**

- SF – Jimmy Garoppolo – 25/34, 322 yards, TD, 2 INT
- TEN – Ryan Tannehill – 22/29, 209 yards, TD

**Top rushers**

- SF – Jeff Wilson Jr. – 14 rushes, 45 yards, TD
- TEN – Jeremy McNichols – 7 rushes, 31 yards

**Top receivers**

- SF – Deebo Samuel – 9 receptions, 159 yards
- TEN – A. J. Brown – 11 receptions, 145 yards, TD

==== Week 17: vs. Miami Dolphins ====
Week 17: Miami Dolphins at Tennessee Titans – Game summary

Quarter	1	2	3	4	Total
Dolphins	0	3	0	0	**3**
**Titans**	7	10	0	17	**34**

at Nissan Stadium, Nashville, Tennessee

- Date: January 2, 2022
- Game time: 12:00 p.m. CST
- Game weather: Cloudy, 36 °F (2 °C)
- Game attendance: 69,091
- Referee: Shawn Smith
- TV announcers (CBS): Kevin Harlan, Trent Green and Melanie Collins
- Recap, Game Book

Game information

**First quarter**

- TEN – Geoff Swaim 1-yard pass from Ryan Tannehill, (Randy Bullock kick) 1:24. Titans 7–0. **Drive: 8 plays, 46 yards, 4:11.**

**Second quarter**

- TEN – Randy Bullock 23-yard field goal, 14:15. Titans 10–0. **Drive: 4 plays, 9 yards, 1:50.**
- MIA – Jason Sanders 39-yard field goal, 9:43. Titans 10–3. **Drive: 10 plays, 54 yards, 4:32.**
- TEN – D'Onta Foreman 21-yard run (Randy Bullock kick), 3:18. Titans 17–3. **Drive: 11 plays, 75 yards, 6:25.**

**Third quarter**

- No scoring plays.

**Fourth quarter**

- TEN – Anthony Firkser 15-yard pass from Ryan Tannehill (Randy Bullock kick), 7:42. Titans 24–3. **Drive: 5 plays, 58 yards, 2:38.**
- TEN – Randy Bullock 44-yard field goal, 2:58. Titans 27–3. **Drive: 7 plays, 18 yards, 2:46.**
- TEN – Dontrell Hilliard 39-yard run (Randy Bullock kick), 1:53. Titans 34–3. **Drive: 3 plays, 38 yards, 0:56.**

**Top passers**

- MIA – Tua Tagovailoa – 18/38, 205 yards, INT
- TEN – Ryan Tannehill – 13/18, 120 yards, 2 TD

**Top rushers**

- MIA – Duke Johnson – 7 rushes, 49 yards
- TEN – D'Onta Foreman – 26 rushes, 132 yards, TD

**Top receivers**

- MIA – Mike Gesicki – 4 receptions, 51 yards
- TEN – A. J. Brown – 2 receptions, 41 yards

With this win, moving the Titans to 11-5, the Titans would clinch back-to-back division titles for the first time since 1960–1962, when the Titans were still in the Eastern Division of the American Football League.

==== Week 18: at Houston Texans ====
Week 18: Tennessee Titans at Houston Texans – Game summary

Quarter	1	2	3	4	Total
**Titans**	0	21	0	7	**28**
Texans	0	0	10	15	**25**

at NRG Stadium, Houston, Texas

- Date: January 9, 2022
- Game time: 12:00 p.m. CST
- Game weather: None (retractable roof closed)
- Game attendance: 66,722
- Referee: Land Clark
- TV announcers (CBS): Andrew Catalon, James Lofton and Sherree Burruss
- Recap, Game Book

Game information

**First quarter**

- No scoring plays

**Second quarter**

- TEN – Anthony Firkser 5-yard pass from Ryan Tannehill (Randy Bullock kick), 7:40. Titans 7–0. **Drive: 11 plays, 94 yards, 6:31.**
- TEN – A. J. Brown 14-yard pass from Ryan Tannehill (Randy Bullock kick), 1:34. Titans 14–0. **Drive: 9 plays, 85 yards, 2:46.**
- TEN – Nick Westbrook-Ikhine 4-yard pass from Ryan Tannehill (Randy Bullock kick), 0:11. Titans 21–0. **Drive: 5 plays, 64 yards, 0:33.**

**Third quarter**

- HOU – Chris Moore 28-yard pass from Davis Mills (Kaʻimi Fairbairn kick), 9:46. Titans 21–7. **Drive: 8 plays, 72 yards, 3:42.**
- HOU – Kaʻimi Fairbairn 31-yard field goal, 2:14. Titans 21–10. **Drive: 8 plays, 52 yards, 4:04.**

**Fourth quarter**

- HOU – Danny Amendola 7-yard pass from Davis Mills (Davis Mills–Danny Amendola pass), 11:40. Titans 21–18. **Drive: 8 plays, 82 yards, 4:01.**
- TEN – Julio Jones 3-yard pass from Ryan Tannehill (Randy Bullock kick), 7:00. Titans 28–18. **Drive: 8 plays, 75 yards, 4:40.**
- HOU – Danny Amendola 26-yard pass from Davis Mills (Kaʻimi Fairbairn kick), 4:04. Titans 28–25. **Drive: 7 plays, 75 yards, 2:56.**

**Top passers**

- TEN – Ryan Tannehill – 23/32, 287 yards, 4 TD
- HOU – Davis Mills – 23/33, 301 yards, 3 TD

**Top rushers**

- TEN – D'Onta Foreman – 21 rushes, 69 yards
- HOU – David Johnson – 5 rushes, 28 yards

**Top receivers**

- TEN – Nick Westbrook-Ikhine – 4 receptions, 78 yards, TD
- HOU – Danny Amendola – 7 receptions, 113 yards, 2 TD

With this win, the Titans would finish the season 12-5 and would clinch the #1 seed in the AFC for the first time since 2008.

=== Standings ===
==== Division ====
AFC South
	W	L	T	PCT	DIV	CONF	PF	PA	STK
^{(1)} Tennessee Titans	12	5	0	.706	5–1	8–4	419	354	W3
Indianapolis Colts	9	8	0	.529	3–3	7–5	451	365	L2
Houston Texans	4	13	0	.235	3–3	4–8	280	452	L2
Jacksonville Jaguars	3	14	0	.176	1–5	3–9	253	457	W1

==== Conference ====
AFC
#	Team	Division	W	L	T	PCT	DIV	CONF	SOS	SOV	STK
**Division winners**
1 (Note: Tennessee finished ahead of Kansas City based on head-to-head victory, claiming the No. 1 seed.)	Tennessee Titans	South	12	5	0	.706	5–1	8–4	.472	.480	W3
2	Kansas City Chiefs	West	12	5	0	.706	5–1	7–5	.538	.517	W1
3	Buffalo Bills	East	11	6	0	.647	5–1	7–5	.472	.428	W4
4	Cincinnati Bengals	North	10	7	0	.588	4–2	8–4	.472	.462	L1
**Wild cards**
5 (Note: Las Vegas claimed the No. 5 seed over New England based on win percentage in common games (5–1 vs. 2–4 against: Miami, Dallas, LA Chargers, Cleveland, and Indianapolis).)	Las Vegas Raiders	West	10	7	0	.588	3–3	8–4	.510	.515	W4
6	New England Patriots	East	10	7	0	.588	3–3	8–4	.481	.394	L1
7	Pittsburgh Steelers	North	9	7	1	.559	4–2	7–5	.521	.490	W2
**Did not qualify for the postseason**
8 (Note: Indianapolis finished ahead of Miami and Los Angeles based on conference record (7–5 vs. 6–6).)	Indianapolis Colts	South	9	8	0	.529	3–3	7–5	.495	.431	L2
9 (Note: Miami finished ahead of LA Chargers based on win percentage in common games (5–1 vs. 2–4 against: New England, Las Vegas, Houston, Baltimore, and NY Giants).)	Miami Dolphins	East	9	8	0	.529	4–2	6–6	.464	.379	W1
10	Los Angeles Chargers	West	9	8	0	.529	3–3	6–6	.510	.500	L1
11 (Note: Cleveland finished ahead of Baltimore based on division record (3–3 vs. 1–5).)	Cleveland Browns	North	8	9	0	.471	3–3	5–7	.514	.415	W1
12	Baltimore Ravens	North	8	9	0	.471	1–5	5–7	.531	.460	L6
13	Denver Broncos	West	7	10	0	.412	1–5	3–9	.484	.357	L4
14 (Note: NY Jets finished ahead of Houston based on head-to-head victory.)	New York Jets	East	4	13	0	.235	0–6	4–8	.512	.426	L2
15	Houston Texans	South	4	13	0	.235	3–3	4–8	.498	.397	L2
16	Jacksonville Jaguars	South	3	14	0	.176	1–5	3–9	.512	.569	W1
**Tiebreakers** (Note: When breaking ties for three or more teams under the NFL's rules, they are first broken within divisions, then comparing only the highest-ranked remaining team from each division.)

== Postseason ==
Round	Date	Opponent (seed)	Result	Record	Venue	Recap
Wild Card	First-round bye					
Divisional	January 22	Cincinnati Bengals (4)	L 16–19	0–1	Nissan Stadium	Recap

=== Game summaries ===
==== AFC Divisional Playoffs: vs. (4) Cincinnati Bengals ====
AFC Divisional Playoffs: (4) Cincinnati Bengals at (1) Tennessee Titans – Game summary

Quarter	1	2	3	4	Total
Bengals	6	3	7	3	19
Titans	0	6	10	0	16

at Nissan Stadium, Nashville, Tennessee

- Date: January 22, 2022
- Game time: 3:30 p.m. CST
- Game weather: Sunny, 34 °F (1 °C)
- Game attendance: 69,242
- Referee: Clete Blakeman
- TV announcers (CBS): Ian Eagle, Trent Green and Evan Washburn
- Recap, Game Book

Game information

First quarter

- CIN – Evan McPherson 38-yard field goal, 12:03. Bengals 3–0. Drive: 6 plays, 22 yards, 2:50.
- CIN – Evan McPherson 45-yard field goal, 2:11. Bengals 6–0. Drive: 6 plays, 61 yards, 3:41.

Second quarter

- TEN – Derrick Henry 3-yard run (run failed), 6:07. Tied 6–6. Drive: 9 plays, 84 yards, 5:10.
- CIN – Evan McPherson 54-yard field goal, 1:35. Bengals 9–6. Drive: 11 plays, 39 yards, 4:32.

Third quarter

- CIN – Joe Mixon 16-yard run (Evan McPherson kick), 9:34. Bengals 16–6. Drive: 9 plays, 65 yards, 5:26.
- TEN – Randy Bullock 34-yard field goal, 1:36. Bengals 16–9. Drive: 7 plays, 56 yards, 3:24.
- TEN – A. J. Brown 33-yard pass from Ryan Tannehill (Randy Bullock kick), 0:15. Tied 16–16. Drive: 2 plays, 27 yards, 1:04.

Fourth quarter

- CIN – Evan McPherson 52-yard field goal, 0:00. Bengals 19–16. Drive: 4 plays, 19 yards, 0:20.

Top passers

- CIN – Joe Burrow – 28/37, 348 yards, INT
- TEN – Ryan Tannehill – 15/24, 220 yards, TD, 3 INT

Top rushers

- CIN – Joe Mixon – 14 rushes, 54 yards, TD
- TEN – D'Onta Foreman – 4 rushes, 66 yards

Top receivers

- CIN – Ja'Marr Chase – 5 receptions, 109 yards
- TEN – A. J. Brown – 5 receptions, 142 yards, TD

== Statistics ==
=== Team ===
Category	Total yards	Yards per game	NFL rank (out of 32)
Passing offense	3,418	201.1	24th
Rushing offense	2,404	141.4	5th
Total offense	5,822	342.5	17th
Passing defense	4,169	245.2	25th
Rushing defense	1,438	84.6	2nd
Total defense	5,607	329.8	12th

=== Individual ===
Category	Player	Total yards
Offense
Passing	Ryan Tannehill	3,734
Rushing	Derrick Henry	937
Receiving	A. J. Brown	869
Defense
Tackles (Solo)	Kevin Byard	58
Sacks	Harold Landry	12
Interceptions	Kevin Byard	5

Statistics correct as of the end of the 2021 NFL season
