= Monty Rice =

American football player (born 1999)

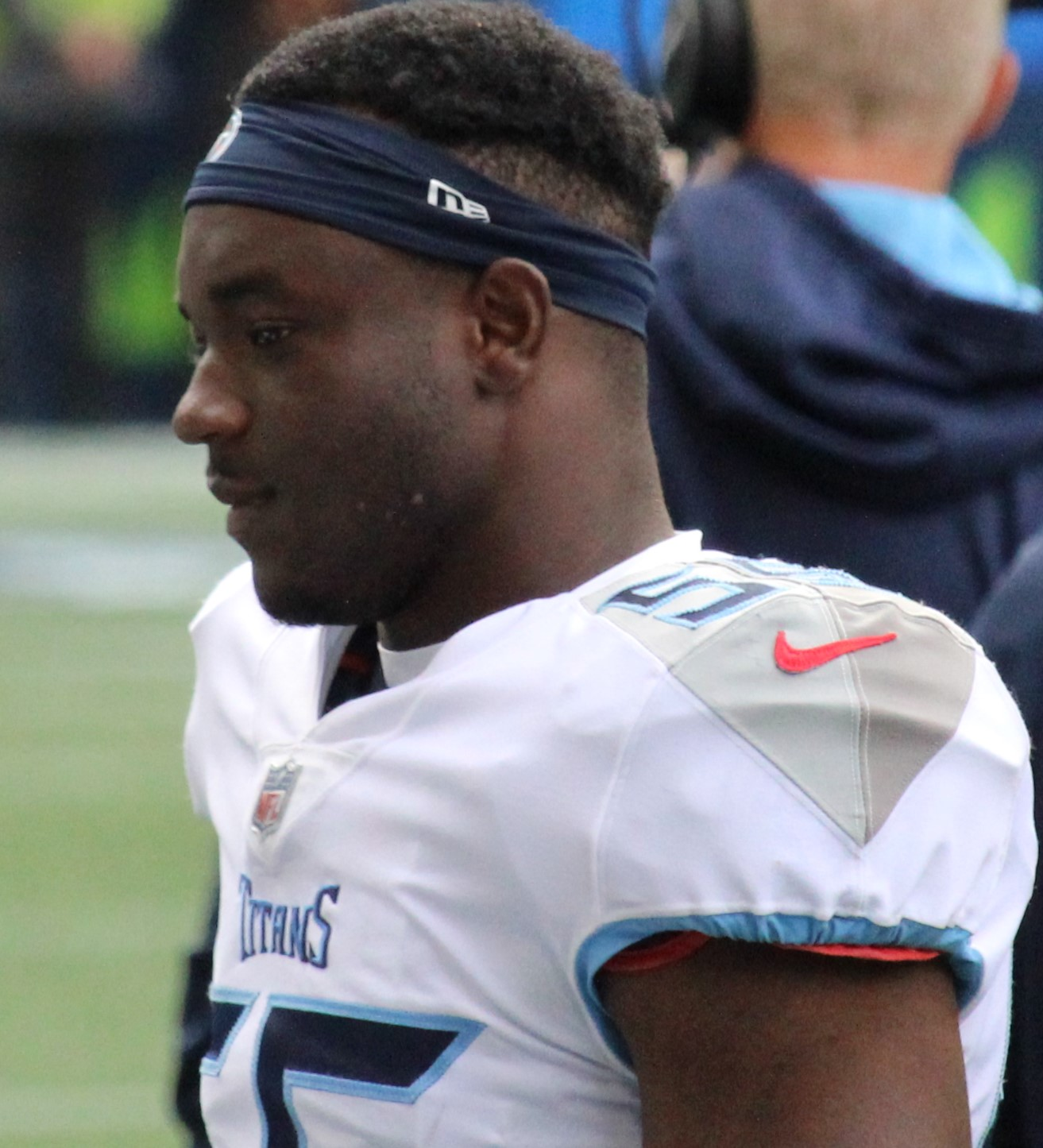
- Rice with the Tennessee Titans in 2021

Profile
- Position: Linebacker

Personal information
- Born: January 8, 1999 (age 27); Huntsville, Alabama, U.S.
- Listed height: 6 ft 0 in (1.83 m)
- Listed weight: 233 lb (106 kg)

Career information
- High school: James Clemens (Madison, Alabama); St. John Paul II Catholic (Huntsville)
- College: Georgia (2017–2020)
- NFL draft: 2021: 3rd round, 92nd overall pick

Career history
- Tennessee Titans (2021–2023); New Orleans Saints (2023); Atlanta Falcons (2024)*; New England Patriots (2024); Detroit Lions (2025); Louisville Kings (2026)*; Los Angeles Rams (2026)*
- * Offseason or practice squad member only

Awards and highlights
- Second-team All-American (2020); First-team All-SEC (2020); Second-team All-SEC (2019)

Career NFL statistics as of 2025
- Total tackles: 131
- Pass deflections: 2
- Stats at Pro Football Reference

Montavian Lamar Rice-Jordan (born January 8, 1999) is an American professional football linebacker. He previously played for the Tennessee Titans and New Orleans Saints. He played college football for the Georgia Bulldogs and was selected by the Titans in the third round of the 2021 NFL draft.

== Early life ==
Rice attended St. John Paul II Catholic High School in Huntsville, Alabama, his freshman year before transferring to James Clemens High School in Madison, Alabama where he spent his final three years. As a senior in 2016, he had 137 tackles, one sack, four interceptions and four touchdowns. Rice originally committed to play college football at Louisiana State University (LSU) but later changed the commitment to the University of Georgia.

== College career ==
Rice played in 14 games with one start as a true freshman at Georgia in 2017 and had 22 tackles. As a sophomore in 2018, he started five of nine games recording 59 tackles and one sack. Rice started all 14 games his junior year in 2019 and was named a co-winner of the team's Vince Dooley Defensive MVP after leading the team with 89 tackles. Rice returned to Georgia for his senior season in 2020 rather than enter the 2020 NFL draft.

== Professional career ==
Pre-draft measurables
Height	Weight	Arm length	Hand span	Wingspan	40-yard dash	10-yard split	20-yard split	20-yard shuttle	Three-cone drill	Vertical jump	Broad jump
6 ft 0 3/8 in (1.84 m)	233 lb (106 kg)	30 3/4 in (0.78 m)	8 3/4 in (0.22 m)	6 ft 2 3/8 in (1.89 m)	4.57 s	1.58 s	2.67 s	4.33 s	7.34 s	32.0 in (0.81 m)	10 ft 1 in (3.07 m)
All values from Pro Day

=== Tennessee Titans ===
Rice was selected by the Tennessee Titans in the third round, 92nd overall, of the 2021 NFL draft. On July 24, 2021, Rice signed his four-year rookie contract with the Titans.

Rice entered his rookie season as a backup inside linebacker behind Rashaan Evans, Jayon Brown, and David Long Jr. He suffered an ankle injury in Week 12 and was placed on injured reserve on November 30, 2021.

Rice was placed on the Active/physically unable to perform list on July 23, 2022. He was placed on the reserve list on August 24. He was activated on October 8.

On December 5, 2023, Rice was waived by the Titans.

=== New Orleans Saints ===
On December 6, 2023, Rice was claimed off waivers by the New Orleans Saints and signed to their active roster. He was waived on August 27, 2024.

=== Atlanta Falcons ===
On August 30, 2024, Rice was signed to the Atlanta Falcons' practice squad. He was released on October 21.

=== New England Patriots ===
On November 5, 2024, Rice was signed to the New England Patriots practice squad. He was promoted to the active roster on January 4, 2025. On August 22, Rice was released by the Patriots.

=== Detroit Lions ===
On September 9, 2025, Rice was signed to the Detroit Lions practice squad. He was released on September 16.

=== Louisville Kings ===
On January 14, 2026, Rice was selected by the Louisville Kings of the United Football League (UFL).

=== Los Angeles Rams ===
On August 13, 2026, Rice signed with the Los Angeles Rams. He was released by the Rams on August 29.
