= Jayon Brown =

American football player (born 1995)

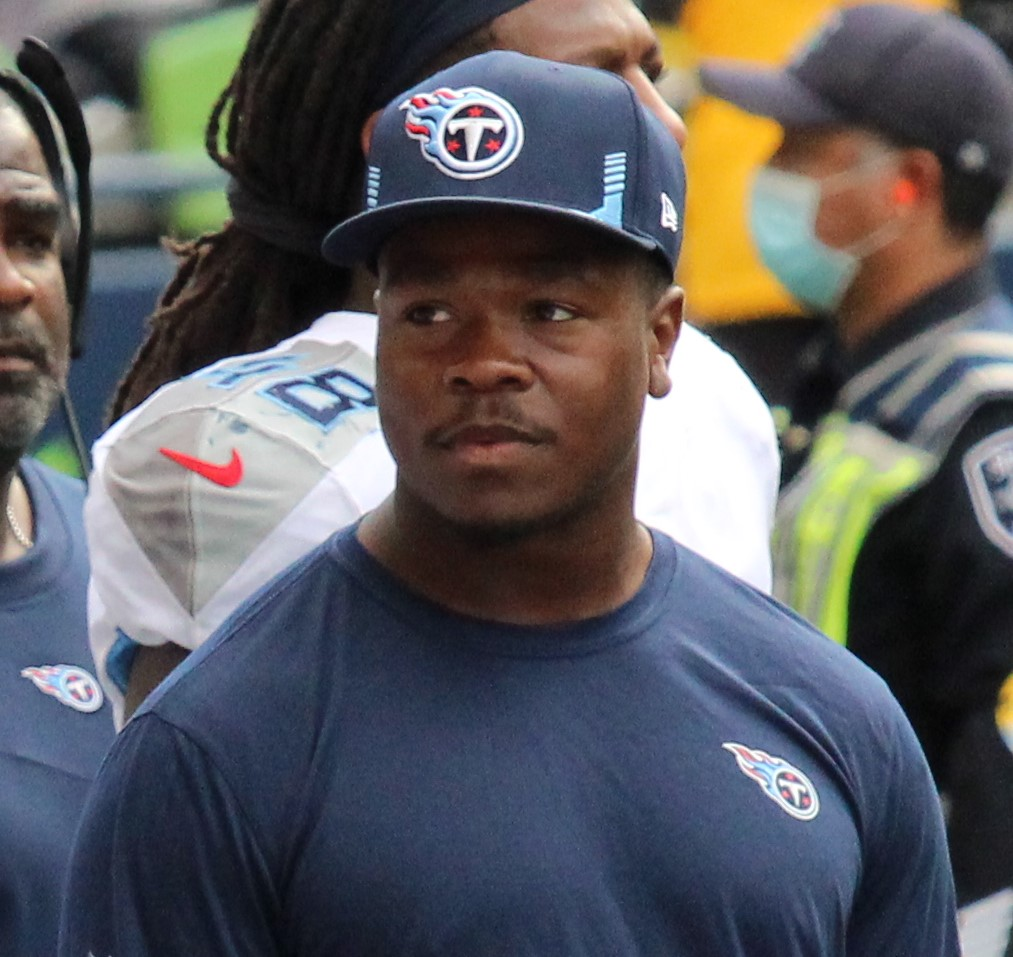
- Brown with the Tennessee Titans in 2021

No. 55, 50
- Position: Linebacker

Personal information
- Born: February 26, 1995 (age 31); Long Beach, California, U.S.
- Listed height: 6 ft 0 in (1.83 m)
- Listed weight: 226 lb (103 kg)

Career information
- High school: Long Beach Polytechnic
- College: UCLA (2013–2016)
- NFL draft: 2017: 5th round, 155th overall pick

Career history
- Tennessee Titans (2017–2021); Las Vegas Raiders (2022)

Awards and highlights
- First-team All-Pac-12 (2016)

Career NFL statistics
- Total tackles: 430
- Sacks: 9.5
- Forced fumbles: 4
- Fumble recoveries: 4
- Pass deflections: 29
- Interceptions: 4
- Defensive touchdowns: 2
- Stats at Pro Football Reference

Jayon Lee Brown (born February 26, 1995) is an American former professional football player who was a linebacker in the National Football League (NFL) for six seasons. He played college football for the UCLA Bruins and was selected by the Tennessee Titans in the fifth round of the 2017 NFL draft. Brown also played for the Las Vegas Raiders.

== Early life ==
Brown was born on February 26, 1995. His younger brother, Joshua, is a linebacker at the University of Arizona, and his two older brothers, Jason and Juwuan, also played college football. Jason played linebacker at Idaho, while Juwuan was a defensive lineman at Southern Oregon. Brown attended Long Beach Polytechnic High School in Long Beach, California.

== College career ==
In four seasons at the University of California, Los Angeles, Brown appeared in 49 games with 21 starts for the Bruins and totaled 220 tackles, three sacks, nine tackles for loss, three interceptions, 15 passes defensed, a forced fumble, and four fumble recoveries. He started 21 games over his final two seasons and totaled nine games with double-digit tackles.

=== Freshman season ===
As a freshman, Brown appeared in all 13 games as a special teams player and reserve linebacker and made six tackles on the season. He was presented with the John Boncheff Jr. Award for Rookie of the Year on special teams at the team's annual banquet and earned a spot on the Athletic Director's Academic Honor Roll.

=== Sophomore season ===
As a sophomore, Brown saw action in 12 games, primarily as a special teams player. He was credited with two tackles on the year and returned five kickoffs for 42 total yards.

=== Junior season ===
As a junior, Brown saw action in 12 games with nine starts, entering the starting lineup after an injury to Myles Jack. He led the team with 93 tackles and ranked second on the squad with six passes defensed.

=== Senior season ===
As a senior, Brown played and started 12 games and led the Bruins with 119 tackles, which tied for 16th on the all-time school single-season list. He added 2.5 sacks, seven tackles for loss (ranked third on team), three interceptions (ranked third on team), 23 passes defensed and two fumble recoveries. Brown was named first-team All-Pac-12 Conference. Additionally, he ranked ninth in the country and led the Pac-12 with 9.9 total tackles per game and tied for 10th in the Pac-12 in interceptions, becoming the first UCLA player with 100 tackles in a season since Eric Kendricks (149) in 2014.

Brown graduated from UCLA in spring 2017 with a degree in political science.

== Professional career ==
Pre-draft measurables
Height	Weight	Arm length	Hand span	Wingspan	40-yard dash	10-yard split	20-yard split	20-yard shuttle	Three-cone drill	Vertical jump	Broad jump	Bench press
6 ft 0 in (1.83 m)	231 lb (105 kg)	31 3/8 in (0.80 m)	9 5/8 in (0.24 m)	6 ft 2 3/8 in (1.89 m)	4.56 s	1.63 s	2.65 s	4.53 s	7.28 s	32.5 in (0.83 m)	10 ft 0 in (3.05 m)	20 reps
All values from NFL Combine/Pro Day

=== Tennessee Titans ===
==== 2017 season ====
External videos
- Titans draft Jayon Brown 155th overall

The Tennessee Titans selected Brown in the fifth round (155th overall) of the 2017 NFL draft. The Titans traded their fifth (164th overall) and sixth round picks (214th overall) to the Philadelphia Eagles and drafted Brown with the fifth round pick (155th overall) they received in return. He was the 19th linebacker drafted in 2017. On May 23, 2017, the Titans signed Brown to a four-year, $2.67 million contract that includes a signing bonus $271,553.

During training camp, Brown competed for a role as a backup inside linebacker against Daren Bates and Nate Palmer. Head coach Mike Mularkey named Brown the primary backup inside linebacker to begin the regular season, behind starters Wesley Woodyard and Avery Williamson.

Brown made his NFL debut in the season-opener against the Oakland Raiders and finished the 26–16 loss with four combined tackles (three solo). In the next game against the Jacksonville Jaguars, Brown had a solo tackle and a pass deflection during the 37–16 road victory. During Week 6 against the Indianapolis Colts on Monday Night Football, he recorded three combined tackles (two solo) and two pass deflections in the 36–22 victory.

During a Week 9 23–20 victory over the Baltimore Ravens, Brown had a season-high six combined tackles (five solo). Three weeks later against the Colts, he recorded two combined tackles (one solo) and 0.5 sacks in the 20–16 road victory. In the next game against the Houston Texans, Brown had a tackle and a pass deflection during the 24–13 victory.

During Week 15 against the San Francisco 49ers, Brown recorded five solo tackles and a sack in the narrow 25–23 road loss. In the regular-season finale against the Jaguars, he had two solo tackles and a fumble recovery during the 15–10 victory as the Titans qualified for the playoffs.

Brown finished his rookie year with 52 combined tackles (38 solo), 1.5 sacks, four pass deflections, and a fumble recovery in 16 games and no starts. Brown was used extensively in nickel packages as a rookie under defensive coordinator Dick LeBeau due to his athleticism and tackling ability. Brown finished the season with 487 defensive snaps (44.7%) while also appearing on special teams.

The Titans finished second in the AFC South with a 9–7 record and qualified for the playoffs as the #5-seed. During the Wild Card Round against the Kansas City Chiefs, Brown made his postseason debut and finished the narrow 22–21 comeback road victory with three combined tackles (two solo). In the Divisional Round against the New England Patriots, Brown had a solo tackle and a pass deflection during the 35–14 road loss.

==== 2018 season ====
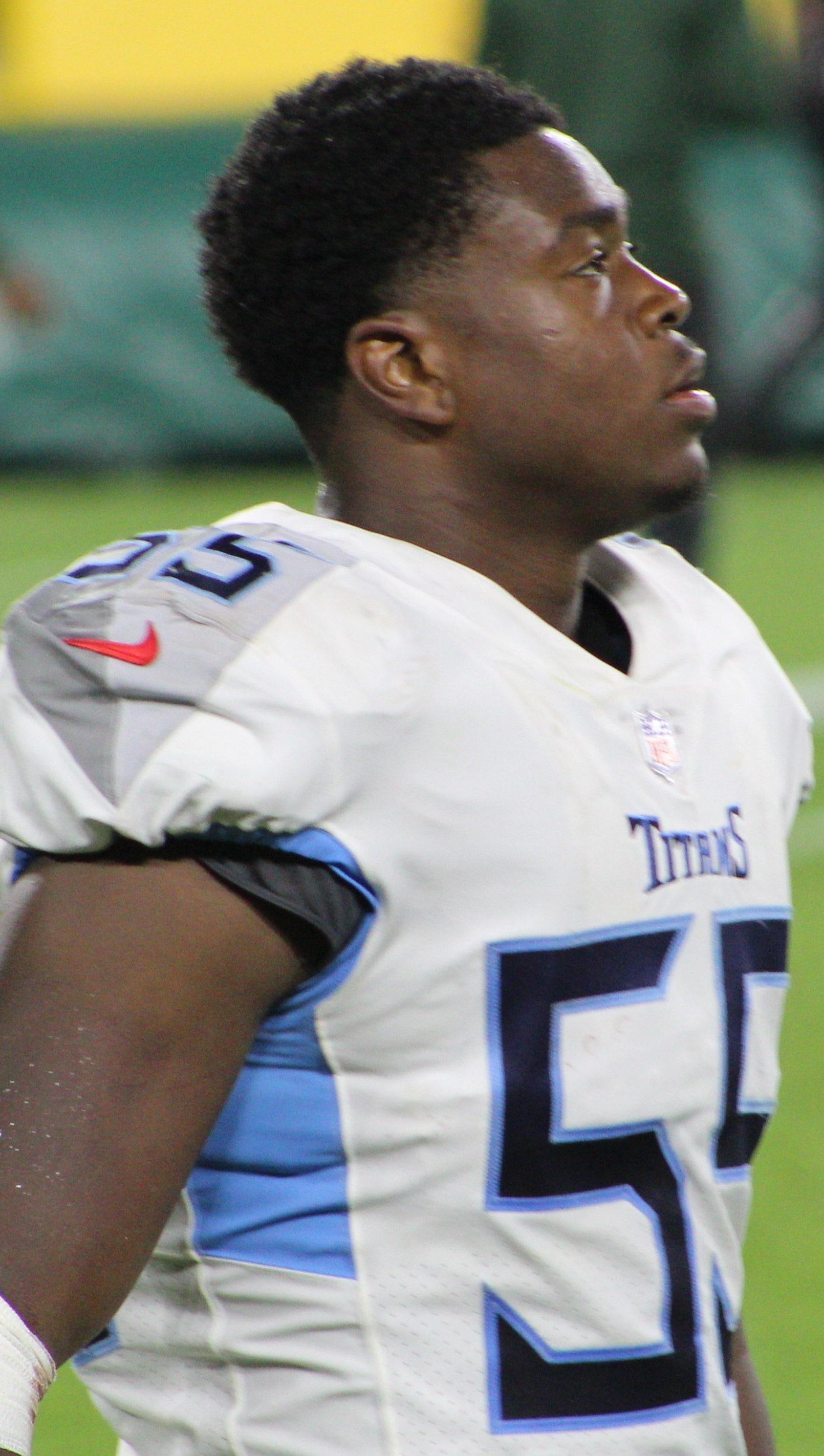
Brown in 2018

On January 20, 2018, the Titans hired Texans' defensive coordinator Mike Vrabel to be their new head coach. Ten days later, Ravens' defensive coordinator Dean Pees was hired as the new defensive coordinator after Dick LeBeau retired. Throughout training camp, Brown competed to be a starting inside linebacker against offseason acquisition Will Compton and first-round pick Rashaan Evans. Vrabel named Brown the backup inside linebacker to start the regular season, behind Compton and veteran Wesley Woodyard.

During Week 4 against the Philadelphia Eagles, Brown earned his first NFL start and recorded a season-high 10 combined tackles (six solo) and a sack in the 26–23 overtime victory. In the next game against the Buffalo Bills, Brown tied his season-high of 10 combined tackles (eight solo) and had another sack during the narrow 13–12 road loss. Two weeks later against the Los Angeles Chargers in London, Brown had a team-high seven combined tackles (six solo) and a sack in the narrow 20–19 loss.

Following a Week 8 bye, the Titans went on the road to face the Dallas Cowboys on Monday Night Football. Brown finished the 28–14 victory with four combined tackles (three solo) and a strip-sack on quarterback Dak Prescott. In the next game against the Patriots, Brown recorded four combined tackles (one solo) and 0.5 sacks during the 34–10 victory. The following week against the Colts, he had five combined tackles (four solo) and a pass deflection in the 38–10 road loss.

During a Week 12 34–17 road loss to the Texans on Monday Night Football, Brown recorded six combined tackles (two solo) and 0.5 sacks. In the next game against the New York Jets, he had five combined tackles (four solo), a sack, and a pass deflection during the 26–22 comeback victory. The following week against the Jaguars on Thursday Night Football, Brown recorded five combined tackles (two solo) and a pass deflection in the 30–9 victory.

During Week 15 against the New York Giants, Brown had three combined tackles (two solo) and a pass deflection in the 17–0 shutout road victory. In the regular-season finale against the Colts, he recorded nine combined tackles (six solo), two pass deflections, a forced fumble, a fumble recovery, and his first NFL interception by picking off Andrew Luck and returned it 22 yards for a touchdown during the 33–17 loss.

Brown finished his second professional season with 97 combined tackles (64 solo), six sacks, six pass deflections, two forced fumbles, a fumble recovery, and a pick-six in 16 games and nine starts. Throughout the season, Pees continued to use Brown in nickel situations as a hybrid linebacker. He was one of only six NFL linebackers with at least six sacks, an interception, a forced fumble, and a fumble recovery in 2018.

==== 2019 season ====
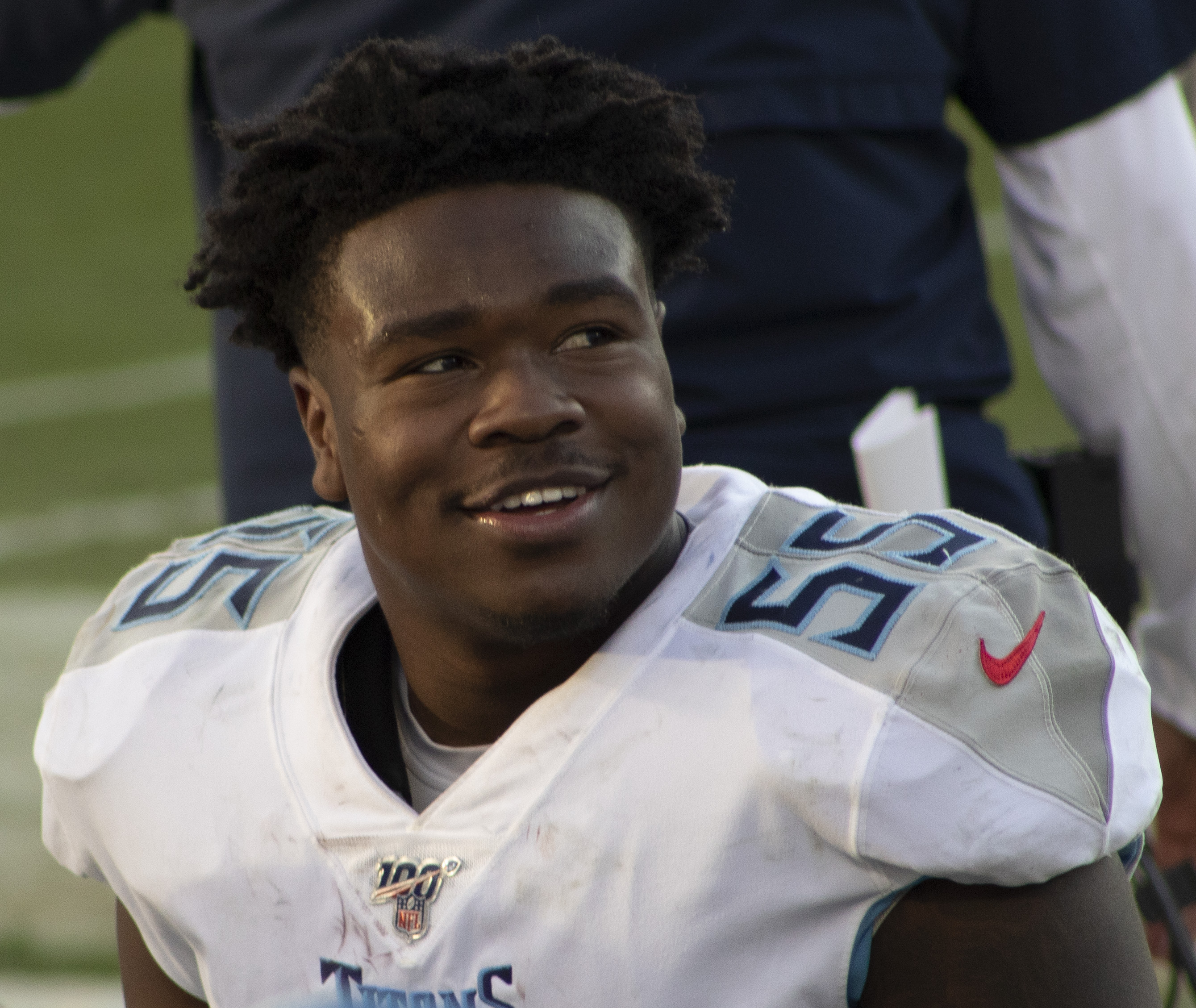
Brown in 2019

During the season-opening 43–13 road victory over the Cleveland Browns, Brown recorded two combined tackles (one solo) and two pass deflections. In the next game against the Colts, he had a team-high nine combined tackles (seven solo) and a pass deflection during the narrow 19–17 loss. The following week against the Jaguars on Thursday Night Football, Brown recorded a team-high 11 combined tackles (seven solo) in the 20–7 road loss.

During Week 4 against the Atlanta Falcons, Brown had seven combined tackles (three solo), a pass deflection, and his first sack of the season on Matt Ryan in the 24–10 road victory. However, Brown missed Week 7 due to a groin injury. He returned in time for the Week 8 matchup against the Tampa Bay Buccaneers and finished the 27–23 victory with eight combined tackles (five solo) and two pass deflections.

During a Week 12 42–20 victory over the Jaguars, Brown recorded a career-high 15 combined tackles (11 solo). In the next game against the Colts, he had nine combined tackles (five solo) and a pass deflection during the 31–17 road victory. The following week against the Raiders, Brown recorded seven combined tackles (two solo) and a fumble recovery forced by teammate Tye Smith on tight end Darren Waller and returned it for a 46-yard touchdown in the fourth quarter of the 42–21 road victory.

During Week 15 against the Texans, Brown recorded a team-high 10 combined tackles (seven solo), a pass deflection, and his first interception of the season off a pass thrown by Deshaun Watson in the 24–21 loss. In the next game against the New Orleans Saints, Brown had a team-high eight combined tackles (seven solo) during the 38–28 loss.

Brown finished the 2019 season with 105 combined tackles (69 solo), a sack, eight pass deflections, an interception, and a fumble recovery returned for a touchdown in 14 games and starts. The Titans finished second in the AFC South with a 9–7 record and qualified for the playoffs as the #6-seed. During the Wild Card Round against the Patriots, Brown made his first postseason start and had three combined tackles (two solo) before leaving the eventual 20–13 road victory in the first half with a shoulder injury. During the AFC Championship Game against the Chiefs, Brown returned from injury and recorded five solo tackles and a pass deflection in the 35–24 road loss.

==== 2020 season ====
Brown was placed on the team's active/physically unable to perform list at the start of training camp on July 28, 2020. He was activated eight days later.

During Week 2 against the Jaguars, Brown had seven tackles (three solo) and a pass deflection in the 33–30 victory. In the next game against the Minnesota Vikings, he recorded a team-high eight combined tackles (six solo) and a pass deflection during the narrow 31–30 victory. Two weeks later against the Bills on Tuesday Night Football, Brown had five combined tackles (three solo) and a forced fumble in the 42–16 victory.

During a Week 6 42–36 overtime victory over the Texans, Brown recorded a team-high 10 combined tackles (four solo). In the next game against the Pittsburgh Steelers, Brown had a team-high eight combined tackles (tied with Malcolm Butler), four pass deflections, and his first interception of the season off a pass thrown by Ben Roethlisberger during the 27–24 loss. The following week against the Cincinnati Bengals, Brown recorded a season-high 12 combined tackles (seven solo) in the 31–20 road loss.

During Week 9 against the Chicago Bears, Brown had a team-high 11 combined tackles (six solo), a sack, and a forced fumble in the 24–17 victory. In the next game against the Colts on Thursday Night Football, he recorded seven combined tackles (five solo) and a pass deflection during the 34–17 loss. The following week against the Ravens, Brown had three combined tackles (two solo) before leaving the eventual 30–24 overtime road victory at the end of the first half with a dislocated and fractured elbow. He was placed on season-ending injured reserve on November 24, 2020.

Brown finished the 2020 season with 76 combined tackles (45 solo), a sack, eight pass deflections, two forced fumbles, and an interception in 10 games and starts. Without Brown, the Titans finished atop the AFC South with an 11–5 record and lost to the Ravens in the Wild Card Round.

==== 2021 season ====
Brown re-signed with the Titans on a one-year contract on March 19, 2021.

After playing in three of the first four games of the season, Brown was placed on injured reserve on October 8 with a knee injury. He was activated on November 6. Brown made his return the next day against the Los Angeles Rams on Sunday Night Football and finished the Week 9 28–16 road victory with seven solo tackles.

During Week 11 against the Texans, Brown recorded a season-high 14 combined tackles (six solo) in the 22–13 loss. In the next game against the Patriots, he had eight combined tackles (five solo) and a pass deflection during the 36–13 road loss. Two weeks later against the Jaguars, Brown recorded three combined tackles (two solo), a pass deflection, and his first interception of the season off a pass thrown by Trevor Lawrence in the 20–0 shutout victory.

Brown finished the 2021 season with 55 combined tackles (35 solo), two pass deflections, and an interception in 10 games and six starts. The Titans finished atop the AFC South with a 12–5 record and qualified for the playoffs as the #1-seed. In the Divisional Round against the Bengals, Brown had two combined tackles (one solo) during the 19–16 loss.

=== Las Vegas Raiders ===
On March 24, 2022, Brown signed a one-year contract with the Las Vegas Raiders.

Brown made his Raiders debut in the season-opener against the Chargers and finished the 24–19 road loss with five combined tackles (four solo). In the next game against the Arizona Cardinals, Brown recorded a season-high 12 combined tackles (eight solo) during the 29–23 overtime loss. The following week against his former team, the Tennessee Titans, Brown had five combined tackles (five solo) and a pass deflection in the narrow 24–22 road loss.

During a Week 10 25–20 loss to the Colts, Brown had eight combined tackles (four solo) and a fumble recovery. On December 13, he was placed on injured reserve with a hand injury.

Brown finished the 2022 season with 45 combined tackles (29 solo), a fumble recovery, and a pass deflection in eight games and six starts.

== NFL career statistics ==
=== Regular season ===
Year	Team	Games		Tackling				Fumbles				Interceptions					
Year	Team	GP	GS	Cmb	Solo	Ast	Sck	FF	FR	Yds	TD	Int	Yds	Avg	Lng	TD	PD
2017	TEN	16	0	52	38	14	1.5	0	1	0	0	0	0	0.0	0	0	4
2018	TEN	16	9	97	64	33	6.0	2	1	7	0	1	22	22.0	22	1	6
2019	TEN	14	14	105	69	36	1.0	0	1	46	1	1	0	0.0	0	0	8
2020	TEN	10	10	76	45	31	1.0	2	0	0	0	1	0	0.0	0	0	8
2021	TEN	10	6	55	35	20	0.0	0	0	0	0	1	2	2.0	2	0	2
2022	LV	8	6	45	29	16	0.0	0	1	0	0	0	0	0.0	0	0	1
Career		74	45	430	280	150	9.5	4	4	53	1	4	24	6.0	22	1	29

=== Postseason ===
Year	Team	Games		Tackling				Fumbles				Interceptions					
Year	Team	GP	GS	Cmb	Solo	Ast	Sck	FF	FR	Yds	TD	Int	Yds	Avg	Lng	TD	PD
2017	TEN	2	0	4	3	1	0.0	0	0	0	0	0	0	0.0	0	0	1
2019	TEN	2	2	8	7	1	0.0	0	0	0	0	0	0	0.0	0	0	1
2020	TEN	0	0	Did not play due to injury													
2021	TEN	1	0	2	1	1	0.0	0	0	0	0	0	0	0.0	0	0	0
Career		5	2	14	11	3	0.0	0	0	0	0	0	0	0.0	0	0	2
