= Mason Kinsey =

American football player (born 1998)

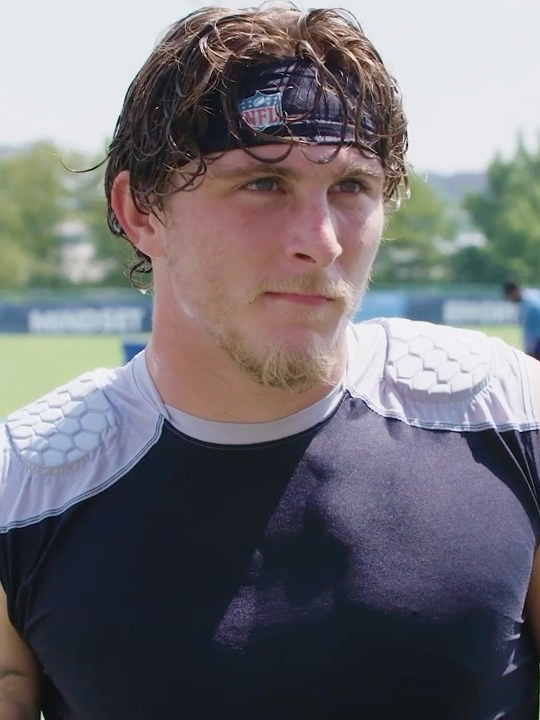
- Kinsey in 2021

Profile
- Positions: Wide receiver, return specialist

Personal information
- Born: August 29, 1998 (age 28); Demorest, Georgia, U.S.
- Listed height: 5 ft 11 in (1.80 m)
- Listed weight: 200 lb (91 kg)

Career information
- High school: Habersham Central (Clarkesville, Georgia)
- College: Berry (2016–2019)
- NFL draft: 2020: undrafted

Career history
- Tennessee Titans (2020)*; New England Patriots (2020)*; Tennessee Titans (2021–2025)
- * Offseason or practice squad member only

Awards and highlights
- 3× All-SAA (2017–2019)

Career NFL statistics as of 2025
- Receptions: 6
- Receiving yards: 74
- Return yards: 139
- Stats at Pro Football Reference

Mason Shane Kinsey (born August 29, 1998) is an American professional football wide receiver and return specialist. He played college football for the Berry Vikings.

== College career ==
Kinsey attended Division III Berry College. In four seasons, he had 203 receptions for 3,343 yards and 50 touchdowns. Kinsey helped the Vikings win four consecutive Southern Athletic Association (SAA) championships and earn three straight bids to the NCAA Division III playoffs. He was a three-time All-SAA first-team honoree and was a third-team D3football.com All-American as a senior.

== Professional career ==
Pre-draft measurables
Height	Weight	Arm length	Hand span	Wingspan	40-yard dash	10-yard split	20-yard split	20-yard shuttle	Three-cone drill	Vertical jump	Broad jump	Bench press
5 ft 10 1/2 in (1.79 m)	198 lb (90 kg)	32 3/8 in (0.82 m)	9 1/4 in (0.23 m)	6 ft 3 in (1.91 m)	4.65 s	1.66 s	2.56 s	4.34 s	7.30 s	37.5 in (0.95 m)	10 ft 5 in (3.18 m)	16 reps
All values from Pro Day

=== Tennessee Titans ===
Kinsey signed with the Tennessee Titans as an undrafted free agent on April 25, 2020, shortly after the conclusion of the 2020 NFL draft. He was waived on September 5, 2020, during final roster cuts.

=== New England Patriots ===
Kinsey was signed by the New England Patriots to their practice squad on September 8, 2020. He was released on October 1, 2020, but was resigned on October 19. Kinsey was released a second time on November 18.

=== Tennessee Titans (second stint) ===
Kinsey was signed to a reserve/futures contract with the Titans on January 21, 2021. He was cut at the end of the preseason again on August 31, but was re–signed to the team's practice squad the following day. Kinsey was elevated to the Titans' active roster on October 24. After the Titans were eliminated in the Divisional Round of the playoffs, he signed a reserve/future contract with the team on January 24, 2022.

On August 30, 2022, Kinsey was waived by the Titans and re–signed to the practice squad the next day. Kinsey was elevated to the active roster on October 21. He signed a reserve/future contract with Tennessee on January 10, 2023. Kinsey played two games during the 2022 season.

On August 29, 2023, Kinsey was waived by the Titans and re-signed to the practice squad. He was promoted to the active roster on September 22. Kinsey was waived on October 2, and re-signed to the practice squad. He was promoted back to the active roster on December 16. Kinsey played six games during the 2023 season, making 11 punt returns.

Kinsey was waived by the Titans on August 27, 2024, and re-signed to the practice squad. He was promoted to the active roster on October 26. Kinsey was waived on October 29, and re-signed to the practice squad two days later. He was promoted to the active roster on December 7. He appeared in six games during the 2024 season, making two receptions for 17 yards along with six punt returns.

On August 26, 2025, Kinsey was waived by the Titans as part of final roster cuts and re-signed to the practice squad the next day. On October 24, Kinsey was signed to the active roster.

On August 30, 2026, Kinsey was waived as a part of final roster cuts before the start of the regular season.
