= Rashaan Evans =

American football player (born 1995)

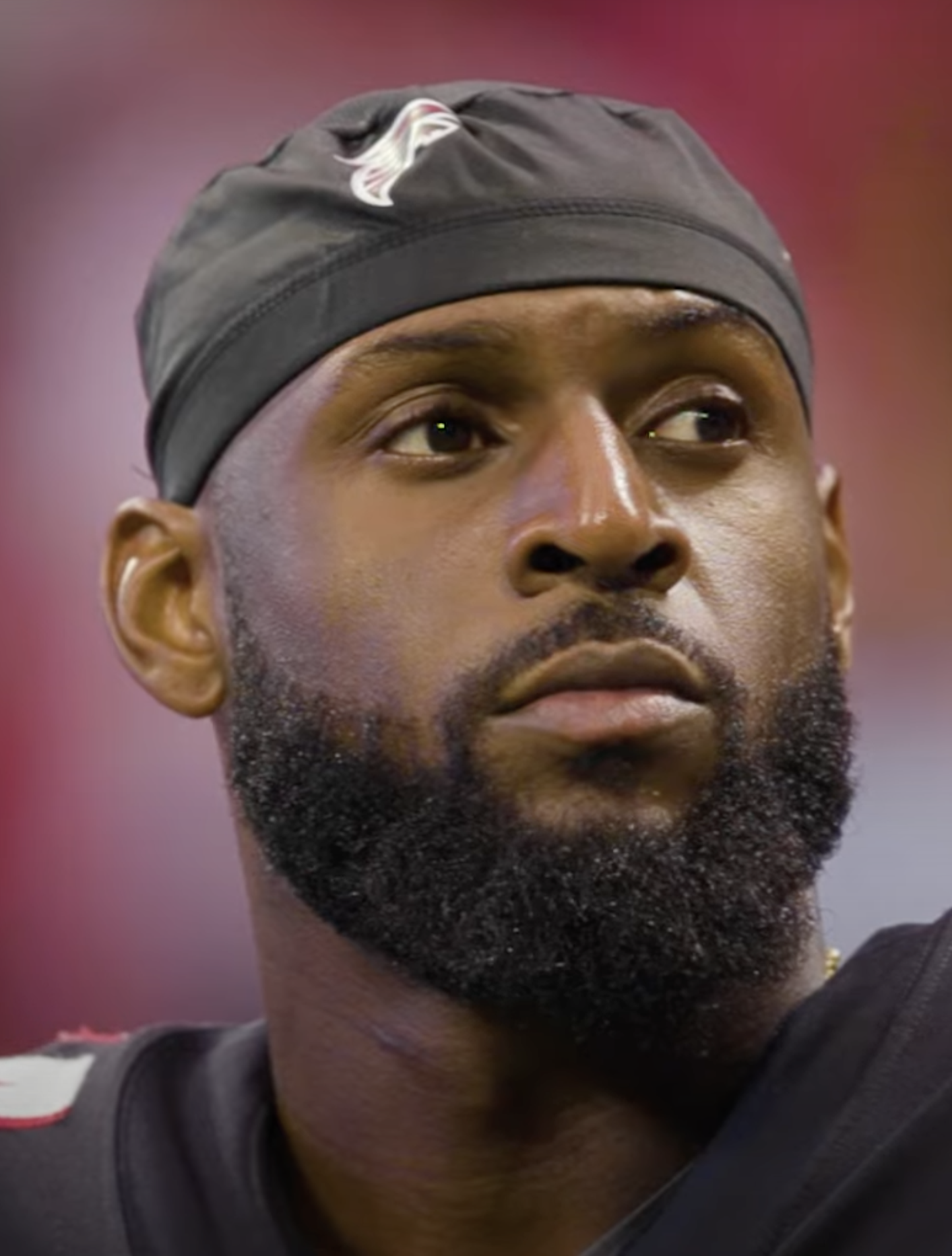
- Evans with the Atlanta Falcons in 2022

Profile
- Position: Linebacker

Personal information
- Born: November 8, 1995 (age 31); Auburn, Alabama, U.S.
- Listed height: 6 ft 2 in (1.88 m)
- Listed weight: 232 lb (105 kg)

Career information
- High school: Auburn
- College: Alabama (2014–2017)
- NFL draft: 2018: 1st round, 22nd overall pick

Career history
- Tennessee Titans (2018–2021); Atlanta Falcons (2022); Philadelphia Eagles (2023)*; Dallas Cowboys (2023); Atlanta Falcons (2024)
- * Offseason or practice squad member only

Awards and highlights
- 2× CFP national champion (2015, 2017); First-team All-American (2017); All-SEC (2017)

Career NFL statistics as of 2024
- Total tackles: 485
- Sacks: 5
- Forced fumbles: 2
- Fumble recoveries: 5
- Interceptions: 2
- Pass deflections: 12
- Defensive touchdowns: 1
- Stats at Pro Football Reference

Alan Rashaan Evans (born November 8, 1995) is an American professional football linebacker. He played college football for the Alabama Crimson Tide, and was selected by the Tennessee Titans in the first round of the 2018 NFL draft. Evans has also played for the Atlanta Falcons and Dallas Cowboys.

== Early life ==
A native of Auburn, Alabama, Evans attended Auburn High School, where he was teammates with Reuben Foster. Evans finished with 77 tackles (including 43 tackles for loss) and 17.5 sacks as a senior in high school, while adding five pass breakups, three forced fumbles, a blocked punt, and a fumble recovery. He was recognized as first team ASWA 6A All-State selection as a junior in 2012 and also played in the Alabama-Mississippi All-Star Game. Evans was a five-star outside linebacker according to 247Sports, rated the eleventh best player in the country; the number one outside linebacker in the country; and the second highest recruit from the state of Alabama behind fellow Alabama commit Marlon Humphrey. Evans was recognized as an Under Armour All-American in 2014.

== College career ==
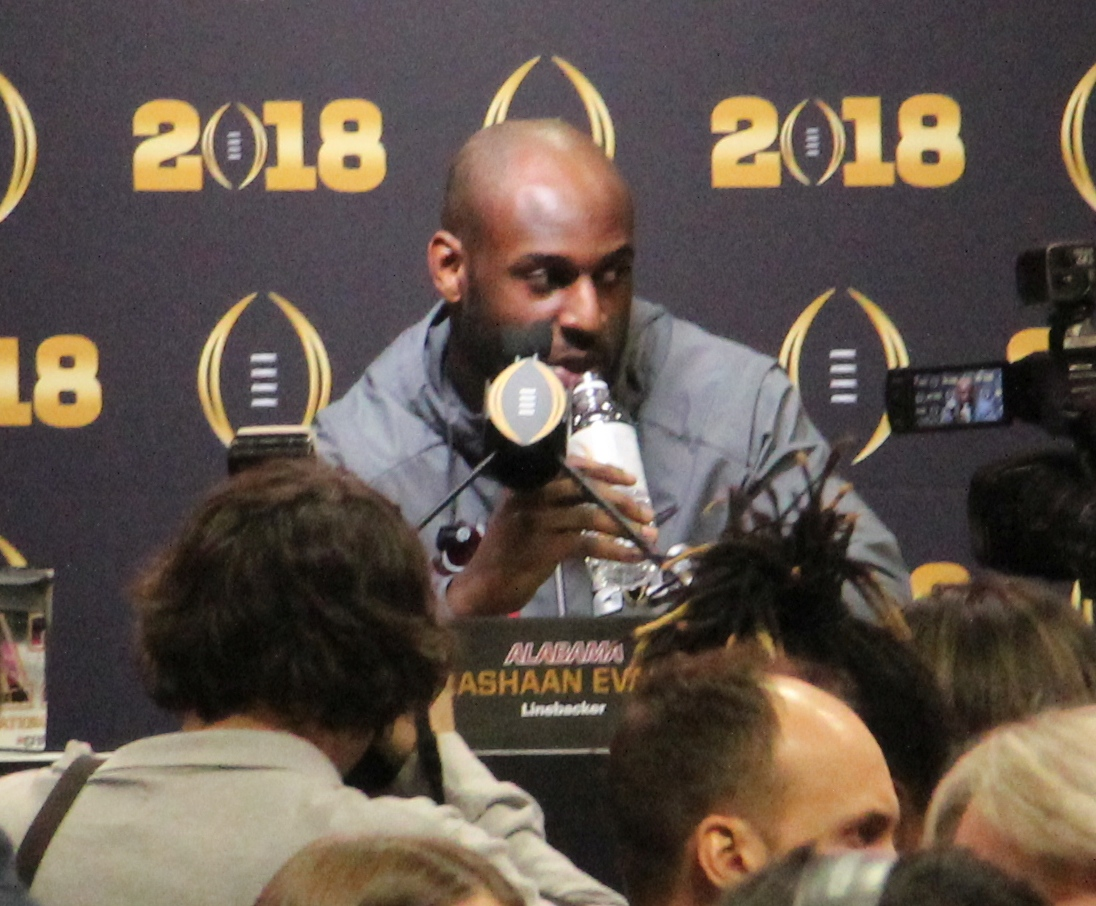
Evans in 2018

Evans played college football at the University of Alabama. As a true freshman, he played on special teams in 13 games with 15 tackles (two for loss) and a sack.

As a sophomore, Evans again mostly played as a special teamer and reserve outside linebacker in 2015, though his two sacks against Clemson in the national championship victory that season put him on many scouts' radars. Evans was a second-team All-Southeastern Conference pick in 2017, starting 12 games, tying for the team lead with 74 tackles, leading the team with 13 tackles for loss, making six sacks, and breaking up three passes. In the team's two playoff games in 2016 (his only starts of the year), Evans made 18 tackles from an inside linebacker position. He had 53 total for the year, including four sacks, six quarterback hurries, and a forced fumble in 14 games. Evans started 14 games over his final two seasons and appeared in three CFP National Championship contests with two victories.

Evans graduated from Alabama in December 2017 with a degree in psychology.

== Professional career ==
Pre-draft measurables
Height	Weight	Arm length	Hand span	Wingspan	20-yard shuttle	Three-cone drill	Vertical jump	Broad jump
6 ft 1 7/8 in (1.88 m)	232 lb (105 kg)	32 1/4 in (0.82 m)	10 in (0.25 m)	6 ft 5 1/4 in (1.96 m)	4.36 s	6.95 s	30 in (0.76 m)	9 ft 8 in (2.95 m)
All values from NFL Combine

=== Tennessee Titans ===
==== 2018 season ====
The Tennessee Titans selected Evans in the first round (22nd overall) of the 2018 NFL draft. Evans was the fifth linebacker drafted in 2018. On May 15, 2018, the Titans signed Evans to a four-year, $11.7 million contract that includes a signing bonus of $6.59 million.

Throughout training camp, Evans competed to be a starting inside linebacker against Will Compton and Jayon Brown. Head coach Mike Vrabel named Evans a backup inside linebacker to start the regular season, behind Wesley Woodyard and Will Compton.

Evans was inactive for the Tennessee Titans' season-opening 27–20 loss at the Miami Dolphins due to a hamstring injury. On September 23, 2018, Evans made his first career start, as well as his first career tackle, against the Jacksonville Jaguars in a 9–6 Week 3 victory. In Week 13, Evans collected a season-high eight combined tackles (six solo) during a 26–22 victory against the New York Jets. Evans finished his rookie season with 53 combined tackles (33 solo) and a pass deflection in 15 games and seven starts.

==== 2019 season ====
In Week 4, Evans made 10 combined tackles and made his first NFL sack during a 24–10 road win at the Atlanta Falcons. Evans was credited with half a sack after he sacked Matt Ryan with teammate Isaiah Mack. During Week 10 against the Kansas City Chiefs, Evans recovered a fumble forced by teammate David Long Jr. on running back Damien Williams and returned it for a 53 yard touchdown in the 35–32 victory.

==== 2020 season ====
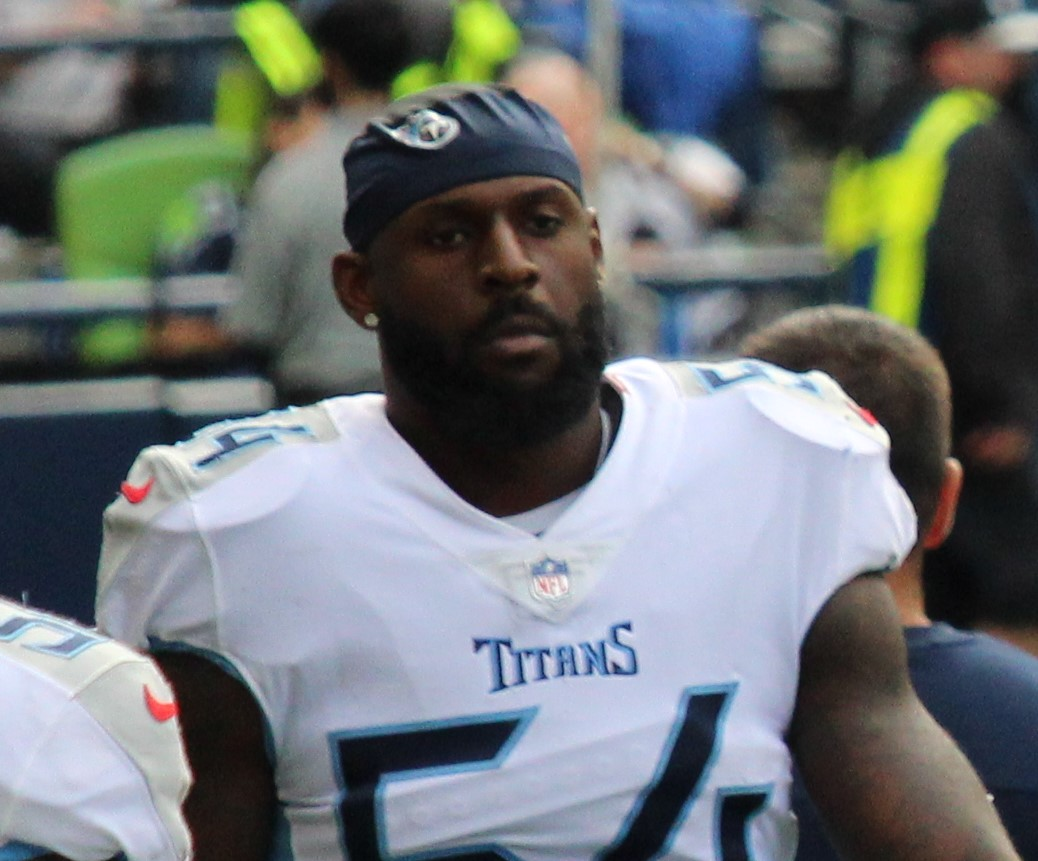
Evans with the Tennessee Titans in 2021.

In Week 1 against the Denver Broncos on Monday Night Football, Evans was ejected for throwing a punch at tight end Jake Butt.

==== 2021 season ====
The Titans declined to exercise the fifth-year option on Evans' contract on May 3, 2021, making him a free agent after the 2021 season.

=== Atlanta Falcons (first stint) ===
On April 4, 2022, Evans signed a one-year contract with the Atlanta Falcons. In Atlanta, he recorded career highs in total tackles, solo tackles, and assists.

=== Philadelphia Eagles ===
On September 12, 2023, the Philadelphia Eagles signed Evans to their practice squad. He was released three days later.

=== Dallas Cowboys ===
On October 11, 2023, the Dallas Cowboys signed Evans to their practice squad. The Cowboys signed him to their active roster on November 18. On December 26, Evans was arrested in Frisco, Texas for possession of marijuana. He was subsequently waived by the Cowboys on December 27.

=== Atlanta Falcons (second stint) ===
On October 1, 2024, Evans signed with the Atlanta Falcons practice squad. He was promoted to the active roster on November 1. He was released on December 21, and re-signed to the practice squad.

=== NFL statistics ===
==== Regular season ====
Year	Team	Games		Tackling				Fumbles				Interceptions					
Year	Team	GP	GS	Comb	Solo	Ast	Sack	FF	FR	Yds	TD	Int	Yds	Avg	Lng	TD	PD
2018	TEN	15	7	53	33	20	0.0	0	0	0	0	0	0	0.0	0	0	1
2019	TEN	16	16	111	69	42	2.5	0	1	53	1	0	0	0.0	0	0	0
2020	TEN	16	16	96	59	37	0.5	0	1	25	0	0	0	0.0	0	0	5
2021	TEN	12	11	57	35	22	0.0	1	1	0	0	2	1	0.5	1	0	2
2022	ATL	17	17	159	86	73	2.0	1	1	0	0	0	0	0	0	0	4
2023	DAL	9	1	9	4	5	0.0	0	0	0	0	0	0	0	0	0	0
Career		85	68	485	286	199	5.0	2	4	78	1	2	1	0.5	1	0	12

==== Postseason ====
Year	Team	Games		Tackling				Fumbles				Interceptions					
Year	Team	GP	GS	Comb	Total	Ast	Sack	FF	FR	Yds	TD	Int	Yds	Avg	Lng	TD	PD
2019	TEN	3	3	18	12	6	0.0	0	0	0	0	0	0	0.0	0	0	0
2020	TEN	1	1	9	5	4	0.0	0	0	0	0	0	0	0.0	0	0	0
Career		4	4	27	17	10	0.0	0	0	0	0	0	0	0.0	0	0	0

== Personal life ==
Evans is the second oldest of five children. He has one younger brother and three sisters. His father, Alan, was a running back at Auburn, and his mother, Chenavis, received four degrees from Auburn, including her doctorate. Evans' older sister was a cheerleader at Auburn, and, despite the family ties including his cousins attending Auburn, Evans chose to attend Alabama. Growing up in rural Alabama, Evans would chase wild horses to work on improving his speed and athleticism.
