= Tye Smith =

American football player (born 1993)

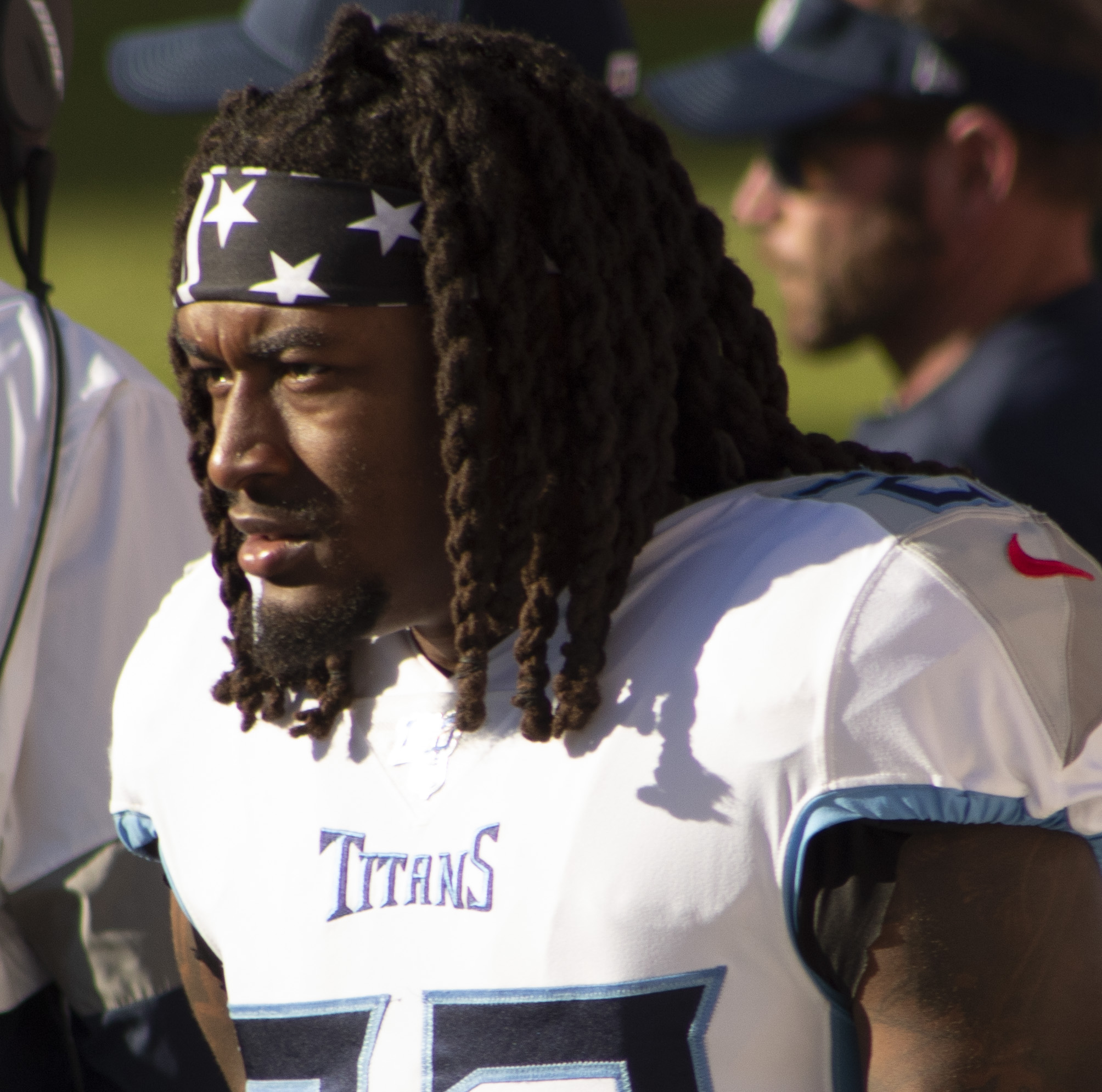
- Smith with the Tennessee Titans in 2019

No. 27 – Orlando Pirates
- Position: Cornerback

Personal information
- Born: May 3, 1993 (age 33); Raleigh, North Carolina, U.S.
- Listed height: 6 ft 0 in (1.83 m)
- Listed weight: 195 lb (88 kg)

Career information
- High school: Wakefield (Raleigh)
- College: Towson (2011–2014)
- NFL draft: 2015: 5th round, 170th overall pick

Career history
- Seattle Seahawks (2015–2016); Washington Redskins (2016)*; Tennessee Titans (2017–2020); Minnesota Vikings (2021); Orlando Guardians (2023); Memphis Showboats (2024)*; Massachusetts / Orlando Pirates (2025–present)
- * Offseason or practice squad member only

Career NFL statistics
- Total tackles: 64
- Forced fumbles: 2
- Pass deflections: 2
- Interceptions: 1
- Total touchdowns: 1
- Stats at Pro Football Reference

Tye Smith (born May 3, 1993) is an American professional football cornerback for the Orlando Pirates of the Indoor Football League (IFL). He played college football for the Towson Tigers and was selected by the Seattle Seahawks in the fifth round of the 2015 NFL draft. He has also been a member of the Washington Redskins, Tennessee Titans, Minnesota Vikings, Orlando Guardians, and Memphis Showboats.

== Early life ==
Smith attended Wakefield High School in Raleigh, North Carolina, where he graduated in 2011.

== College career ==
Smith committed to Towson University where he enrolled in July 2011. He attended Towson from 2011 to 2014 and played all four years.

== Professional career ==
Pre-draft measurables
Height	Weight	Arm length	Hand span	Wingspan	40-yard dash	10-yard split	20-yard split	20-yard shuttle	Three-cone drill	Vertical jump	Broad jump	Bench press
6 ft 0 1/8 in (1.83 m)	195 lb (88 kg)	32 in (0.81 m)	8 3/4 in (0.22 m)	6 ft 6 in (1.98 m)	4.56 s	1.60 s	2.65 s	3.96 s	6.97 s	36.5 in (0.93 m)	10 ft 4 in (3.15 m)	15 reps
All values from NFL Combine/Pro Day

=== Seattle Seahawks ===
Smith was selected by the Seattle Seahawks in the fifth round, 170th overall, of the 2015 NFL draft.

On September 3, 2016, he was released by the Seahawks as part of final roster cuts. On September 8, 2016, he was signed to the Seahawks' practice squad. He was released on September 21, 2016.

=== Washington Redskins ===
On September 27, 2016, Smith was signed to the Washington Redskins' practice squad.

=== Tennessee Titans ===
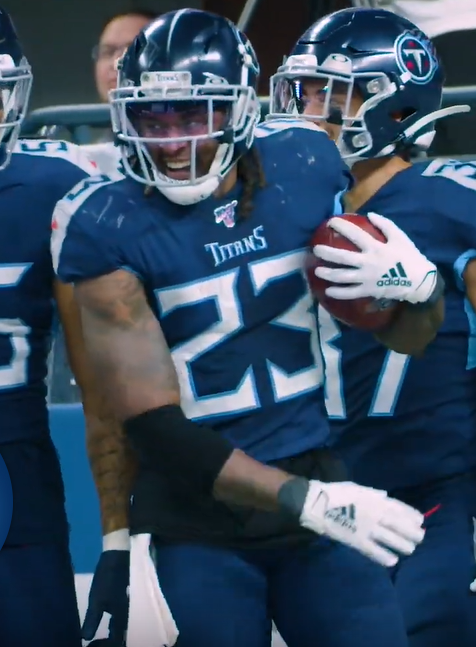
Smith with the Titans after returning a blocked field goal for a touchdown in 2019

On January 16, 2017, Smith signed a futures contract with the Tennessee Titans. In 2017, Smith played in a career-high 15 games in his first season with the Titans and posted career-bests with 11 tackles, an interception and eight special teams tackles. He was placed on injured reserve on July 31, 2018.

Smith re-signed with the Titans on March 13, 2019. He was waived on November 2, 2019. Smith was re-signed on November 5, 2019, after a wrist injury to Malcolm Butler. In week 13 against the Indianapolis Colts, Smith recovered a field goal attempt by Adam Vinatieri that was blocked by teammate Dane Cruikshank and returned it for a 63-yard touchdown in the 31–17 win. In week 14 against the Oakland Raiders, Smith forced a fumble on tight end Darren Waller which was recovered by teammate Jayon Brown who returned the ball for a 46-yard touchdown during the 42–21 win.

Smith re-signed to a one-year deal with the Titans on April 21, 2020. He was released on September 5, 2020, and signed to the practice squad the next day. He was promoted to the active roster on September 14, 2020. He was placed on injured reserve on November 7, 2020. He was activated on November 28, 2020.

=== Minnesota Vikings ===
On June 3, 2021, Smith signed a contract with the Minnesota Vikings. He was released on August 31, 2021, and re-signed to the practice squad the next day.

On March 28, 2022, Smith re-signed with the Vikings. He was released on August 16, 2022, but re-signed nine days later. He was released on August 29.

=== Orlando Guardians ===
Smith signed with the Orlando Guardians of the XFL on March 6, 2023. The Guardians folded when the XFL and United States Football League merged to create the United Football League (UFL).

=== Memphis Showboats ===
On January 15, 2024, Smith was selected by the Memphis Showboats during the Super Draft portion of the 2024 UFL dispersal draft. He signed with the team on January 22. He was waived on March 23, 2024.
