= Todd Downing =

American football coach (born 1980)

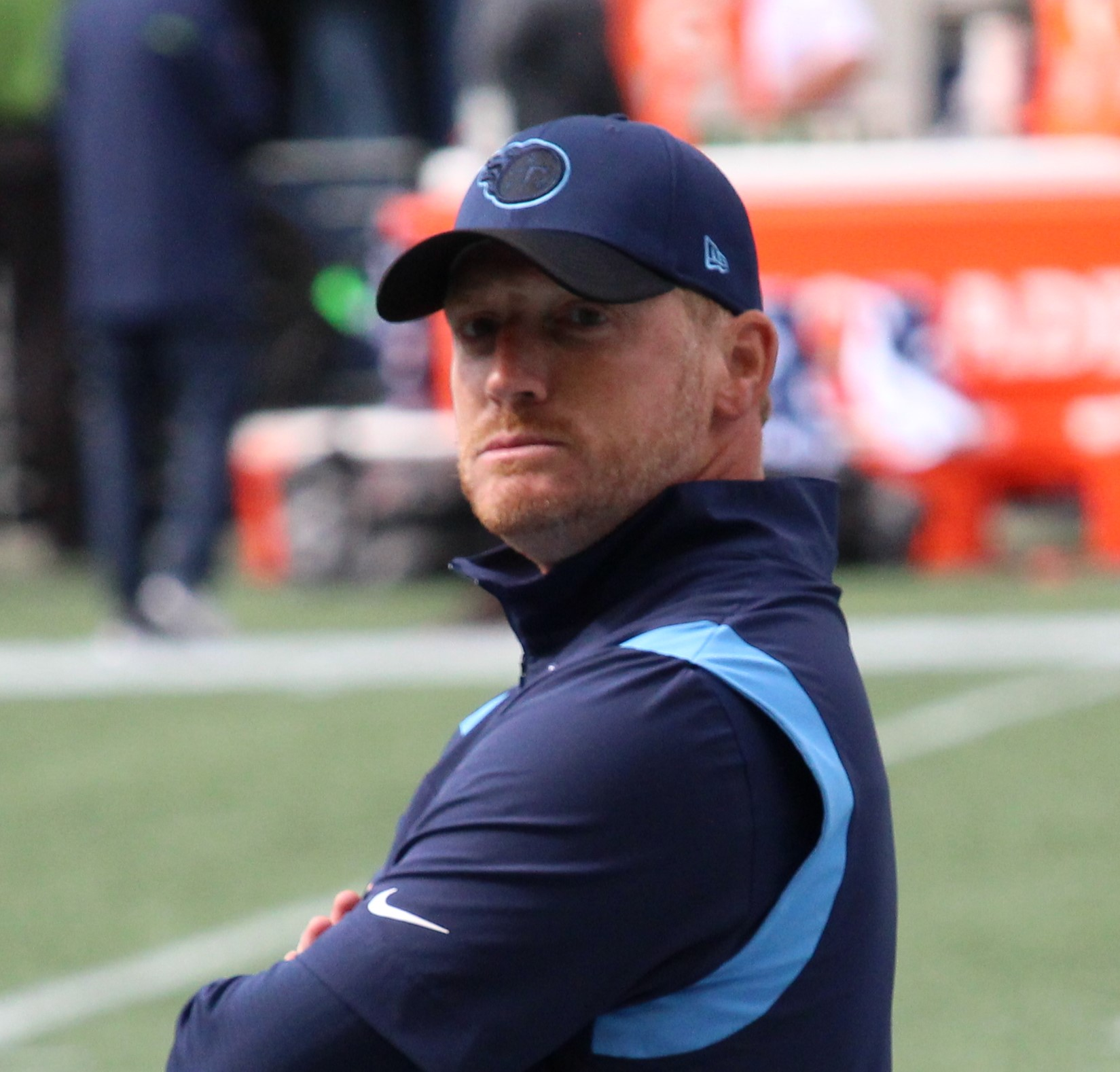
- Downing with the Tennessee Titans in 2021

New England Patriots
- Title: Wide receivers coach

Personal information
- Born: July 22, 1980 (age 46); Eden Prairie, Minnesota, U.S.

Career information
- High school: Eden Prairie (MN)
- College: Minnesota

Career history

Coaching
- Eden Prairie HS (MN) (1999–2000) Assistant freshmen coach; Minnesota Vikings (2005) Offensive quality control coach; St. Louis Rams (2006–2008); Defensive assistant & Special teams assistant (2006–2007); Defensive quality control coach (2008); Detroit Lions (2009–2013); Offensive quality control coach (2009); Assistant quarterbacks coach (2010–2011); Quarterbacks coach (2012–2013); Buffalo Bills (2014) Quarterbacks coach; Oakland Raiders (2015–2017); Quarterbacks coach (2015–2016); Offensive coordinator (2017); Minnesota Vikings (2018) Tight ends coach; Tennessee Titans (2019–2022); Tight ends coach (2019–2020); Offensive coordinator (2021–2022); New York Jets (2023–2024); Passing game coordinator (2023); Quarterbacks coach & passing game coordinator (2024); New England Patriots (2025–present) Wide receivers coach

Operations
- Minnesota Vikings (2001–2004); Research & Development Intern (2001); Public Relations Intern (2002); Football systems analyst (2003–2004)

Awards and highlights
- PFF Quarterbacks Coach of the Year (2015)
- Coaching profile at Pro Football Reference

Todd Downing (born July 22, 1980) is an American professional football coach who is currently the wide receivers coach for the New England Patriots of the National Football League (NFL). He has previously served as the offensive coordinator for the Oakland Raiders and Tennessee Titans as well as an assistant coach for the New York Jets, Minnesota Vikings, Buffalo Bills, Detroit Lions, and St. Louis Rams.

== Playing career ==
Downing played quarterback for the Minnesota Maulers, a semi-pro football team from 2000 to 2002, and helped the Maulers reach three consecutive championship games.

== Coaching career ==
=== Early career ===
Downing received his first coaching job when he was hired as a ninth grade B team offensive coach at Eden Prairie High School. While coaching at his high school, the Eagles won the Class 5A state title in 2000 over Matt Birk's Cretin Derham Hall Raiders.

=== Minnesota Vikings ===
After being offered an internship in 2001 by Chad Ostlund in Research and Development for the Minnesota Vikings, Downing was a Public Relations intern for 2002, a football systems analyst from 2003 to 2004, and the offensive quality control coach in 2005.

=== St. Louis Rams ===
In 2006, Downing was hired by the St. Louis Rams to be a defensive assistant and special teams assistant coach. He would keep this job for two seasons before becoming the defensive quality control coach.

=== Detroit Lions ===
In 2009, Downing was hired by the Detroit Lions with Scott Linehan as an offensive quality control coach. Downing was the assistant quarterbacks coach in 2010 and was promoted to quarterbacks coach the following year. While he was coaching quarterbacks in Detroit, Matthew Stafford averaged 4,885 yards, 30 touchdowns, and 17 interceptions from 2011 to 2013.

=== Buffalo Bills ===
On January 24, 2014, Downing was hired by the Buffalo Bills as their quarterbacks coach.

=== Oakland Raiders ===
In 2015, Downing was hired by the Oakland Raiders to be their quarterbacks coach under head coach Jack Del Rio. Downing is credited for helping Derek Carr become the first Raiders quarterback to be selected to a Pro Bowl since 2002. On January 20, 2016, Downing was named by Pro Football Focus as Quarterbacks Coach of the Year.

In 2017, Downing was promoted to offensive coordinator after the Raiders decided not to renew Bill Musgrave's contract. When Downing coached Carr from 2015 to 2016, he threw for 7,924 yards, 60 touchdowns, and 19 interceptions with two Pro Bowl appearances.

Downing was fired on January 1, 2018, along with head coach Jack Del Rio and the rest of Del Rio's staff after dropping from 12–4 to 6–10 due to a major regression of the offense. The Raiders finished the season 23rd in scoring.

=== Minnesota Vikings (second stint) ===
On February 19, 2018, Downing was hired by the Minnesota Vikings as a senior offensive assistant. Following the sudden and unexpected passing of Vikings offensive line coach Tony Sparano prior to training camp in 2018, tight ends coach Clancy Barone was shifted to coach the offensive line, alongside Sparano's assistant offensive line coach, Andrew Janocko, while Downing was moved from senior offensive assistant to tight ends coach to fill the vacant position.

=== Tennessee Titans ===
On January 26, 2019, Downing was hired by the Tennessee Titans as their tight ends coach under head coach Mike Vrabel.

On January 29, 2021, Downing was promoted to offensive coordinator, replacing Arthur Smith, who was hired as head coach of the Atlanta Falcons two weeks prior. In Downing's first season as offensive coordinator, the Titans finished 17th in overall offense and 15th in points scored.

On January 9, 2023, Downing was fired after the Titans finished the 2022 season 30th in overall offense and 28th in points scored (17.5 per game).

=== New York Jets ===
On February 13, 2023, Downing was hired by the New York Jets as their passing game coordinator under head coach Robert Saleh.

On February 20, 2024, Downing was also named as the quarterbacks coach after quarterbacks coach Rob Calabrese left to become an offensive assistant for the Los Angeles Rams. On October 10, Downing was handed over offensive play calling duties from Nathaniel Hackett. This decision was made by interim head coach Jeff Ulbrich, following the firing of Robert Saleh. The decision was allegedly going to be made by Saleh, but he was fired minutes before withdrawing Hackett's play calling abilities.

=== New England Patriots ===
On February 3, 2025, Downing was hired by the New England Patriots as their wide receivers coach, reuniting him with new head coach Mike Vrabel.

== Personal life ==
Downing grew up in Eden Prairie, Minnesota. He and his wife, Julie, have a son named Jackson. Downing was arrested for a DUI when driving back from a game in November 2022.
