= 2020 Tennessee Titans season =

61st season in franchise history

- Owner: KSA Industries
- General manager: Jon Robinson
- Head coach: Mike Vrabel
- Offensive coordinator: Arthur Smith
- Home stadium: Nissan Stadium

Results
- Record: 11–5
- Division place: 1st AFC South
- Playoffs: Lost Wild Card Playoffs (vs. Ravens) 13–20
- All-Pros: RB Derrick Henry (1st team)
- Pro Bowlers: 2: RB Derrick Henry; WR A. J. Brown

Uniform
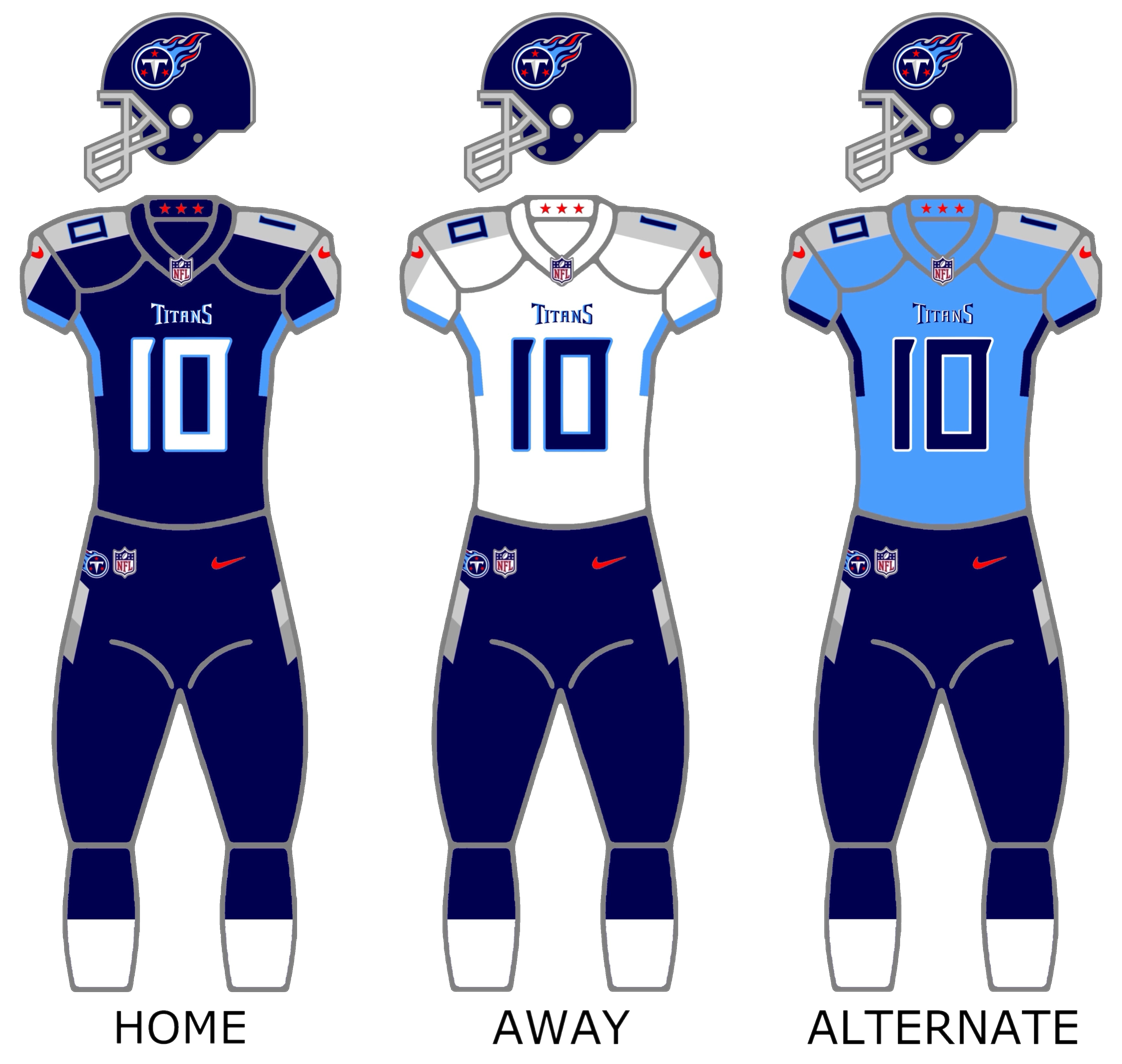

The 2020 season was the Tennessee Titans' 51st in the National Football League (NFL), their 61st overall, their 24th in the state of Tennessee, and their third under head coach Mike Vrabel. After starting the season 5–0, their first since the 2008 season, the Titans improved upon their 9–7 season from the previous 4 years and earned their first double-digit winning season and division title since 2008. The Titans finished tied with the Indianapolis Colts for the AFC South division title, but won the tiebreaker based on record vs. division opponents (5–1 to 4–2). In the Wild Card Round, the Titans blew a 10–0 lead and were upset by Lamar Jackson's Baltimore Ravens, 20–13. The 2020 Titans were the most recent AFC division champion to lose in the Wild Card round until the Jacksonville Jaguars lost to the Buffalo Bills in 2025.

Titans running back and Associated Press NFL Offensive Player of the Year Derrick Henry rushed for 2,000 yards in 2020, making him the second Tennessee Titan to do so, after Chris Johnson; this also made the Titans the first team in league history to have multiple members in the 2,000-yard club.

== Offseason ==
=== Coaching changes ===
Titans defensive coordinator Dean Pees retired on January 20, 2020, after spending the last two seasons with the team. On the same day, it was announced that secondary coach Kerry Coombs would be leaving to rejoin the coaching staff at Ohio State. On January 28, 2020, the Titans hired Anthony Midget to replace Coombs as secondary coach. On February 6, 2020, former New Orleans Saints and St. Louis Rams head coach Jim Haslett was hired to be the inside linebackers coach for the Titans. Head coach Mike Vrabel decided not to hire a defensive coordinator for the season. Following the Titans' 20–13 defeat against the Baltimore Ravens in the Wild Card round of the playoffs, Vrabel revealed that outside linebackers coach Shane Bowen was defensive coordinator in all but title, and that Bowen made the defensive play calls.

=== Roster changes ===
==== Reserve/future free agent contracts ====
Player	Position
Amani Bledsoe	DE
Dalyn Dawkins	RB
Kenneth Durden	CB
Nigel Harris	OLB
Parker Hesse	TE
Daniel Munyer	C
Kareem Orr	CB
David Quessenberry	G
Joshua Smith	LB
Trevion Thompson	WR
Shaun Wilson	RB
Logan Woodside	QB

==== Free agents ====
2020 Tennessee Titans Free Agency
Position	Player	Status*	Date signed	2019 Team	2020 Team
ILB	Daren Bates	UFA		Tennessee Titans	Houston Texans
WR	Cameron Batson	ERFA	February 19, 2020	Tennessee Titans	Tennessee Titans
OLB	Vic Beasley	UFA	March 31, 2020	Atlanta Falcons	Tennessee Titans
CB	Tramaine Brock	UFA		Tennessee Titans	Jacksonville Jaguars
RT	Jack Conklin	UFA	March 20, 2020	Tennessee Titans	Cleveland Browns
OLB	Kamalei Correa	UFA	April 10, 2020	Tennessee Titans	Tennessee Titans
DE	Jack Crawford	UFA	April 8, 2020	Atlanta Falcons	Tennessee Titans
ILB	Nick Dzubnar	UFA	March 26, 2020	Los Angeles Chargers	Tennessee Titans
TE	Anthony Firkser	ERFA	February 13, 2020	Tennessee Titans	Tennessee Titans
RB	David Fluellen	UFA		Tennessee Titans	None
G	Avery Gennesy	UFA	April 17, 2020	None	Tennessee Titans
OLB	Reggie Gilbert	ERFA	March 10, 2020	Tennessee Titans	Tennessee Titans
RB	Derrick Henry	UFA	April 2, 2020	Tennessee Titans	Tennessee Titans
TE	Cole Herdman	UFA	February 3, 2020	None	Tennessee Titans
WR	Darius Jennings	UFA	March 30, 2020	Tennessee Titans	Los Angeles Chargers
NT	Austin Johnson	UFA	March 30, 2020	Tennessee Titans	New York Giants
OT	Dennis Kelly	UFA	March 16, 2020	Tennessee Titans	Tennessee Titans
QB	Marcus Mariota	UFA	March 25, 2020	Tennessee Titans	Las Vegas Raiders
CB	Christopher Milton	UFA	March 12, 2020	Tennessee Titans	Tennessee Titans
G	Kevin Pamphile	UFA		Tennessee Titans	None
TE	MyCole Pruitt	UFA	March 24, 2020	Tennessee Titans	Tennessee Titans
CB	Logan Ryan	UFA	August 31, 2020	Tennessee Titans	New York Giants
OT	Ty Sambrailo	UFA	March 25, 2020	Atlanta Falcons	Tennessee Titans
WR	Tajae Sharpe	UFA	March 26, 2020	Tennessee Titans	Minnesota Vikings
CB	LeShaun Sims	UFA	March 31, 2020	Tennessee Titans	Cincinnati Bengals
CB	Tye Smith	RFA	April 21, 2020	Tennessee Titans	Tennessee Titans
QB	Ryan Tannehill	UFA	March 17, 2020	Tennessee Titans	Tennessee Titans
ILB	Wesley Woodyard	UFA		Tennessee Titans	None
*RFA: Restricted free agent, UFA: Unrestricted free agent, ERFA: Exclusive rights free agent
Legend: = Addition = Departure = Re-signed

==== Departures ====
Position	Player	Date Released/Waived
RB	Dion Lewis	March 12, 2020
K	Ryan Succop	March 13, 2020
OLB	Cameron Wake	March 12, 2020
TE	Delanie Walker	March 13, 2020

=== Draft ===
2020 Tennessee Titans Draft
Round	Selection	Player	Position	College
1	29	Isaiah Wilson	OT	Georgia
2	61	Kristian Fulton	CB	LSU
3	93	Darrynton Evans	RB	Appalachian State
5	174	Larrell Murchison	DT	NC State
7	224	Cole McDonald	QB	Hawaii
7	243	Chris Jackson	CB	Marshall

2020 Tennessee Titans Draft Picks: Traded
Draft pick year	Round	Overall	Team	Received
2019	7	233	to Miami Dolphins	Received Miami's 2019 sixth-round selection (No. 188 overall) and quarterback Ryan Tannehill.
2020	4	135	to Miami Dolphins	Received Miami's 2019 sixth-round selection (No. 188 overall) and quarterback Ryan Tannehill.
2020	6	208	to Green Bay Packers	Received linebacker Reggie Gilbert.
2020	7	237	to Kansas City Chiefs	Received Kansas City's 2021 sixth-round selection.

2020 Tennessee Titans Draft Picks: Received
Draft pick year	Round	Overall	Team	Traded
2020	7	224	from Cleveland Browns	Traded wide receiver Taywan Taylor.
2020	7	237	from Denver Broncos	Traded defensive end Jurrell Casey.

=== Undrafted free agents ===
2020 Tennessee Titans Undrafted Free Agents
Name	Position	School
Aaron Brewer	C	Texas State
Cale Garrett	ILB	Missouri
Tommy Hudson	TE	Arizona State
Khaylan Kearse-Thomas	ILB	Arizona State
Brandon Kemp	OT	Valdosta State
Mason Kinsey	WR	Berry College
Tucker McCann	PK	Missouri
Anthony McKinney	OT	TCU
Cameron Scarlett	RB	Stanford
Kobe Smith	NT	South Carolina
Teair Tart	DT	FIU
Nick Westbrook-Ikhine	WR	Indiana
Kristian Wilkerson	WR	Southeast Missouri State
Kyle Williams	WR	Arizona State

Made regular season roster

== Staff ==
2020 Tennessee Titans staff
Front office: Owner – KSA Industries; Controlling owner – Amy Adams Strunk; President/CEO – Burke Nihill; Executive vice president/general manager – Jon Robinson; Vice president of football administration – Vin Marino; Vice president of player personnel – Ryan Cowden; Director of college scouting – Jon Salge; Director of pro scouting – Brian Gardner; Assistant director of pro scouting – Kevin Turks; Head coaches: Head coach – Mike Vrabel; Offensive coaches: Offensive coordinator – Arthur Smith; Quarterbacks – Pat O'Hara; Running backs – Tony Dews; Wide receivers – Rob Moore; Tight ends – Todd Downing; Offensive line – Keith Carter; Assistant offensive line – Mike Sullivan; Offensive assistant – Luke Steckel; Quality control – Chandler Henley	Defensive coaches: Defensive line – Terrell Williams; Outside linebackers – Shane Bowen; Inside linebackers – Jim Haslett; Secondary − Anthony Midget; Safeties – Scott Booker; Defensive assistant – Matt Edwards; Quality control – Zak Kuhr; Special teams coaches: Special teams coordinator – Craig Aukerman; Assistant special teams – Ryan Crow; Strength and conditioning: Strength and conditioning – Frank Piraino; Strength and conditioning assistant – Brian Bell; Strength and conditioning assistant – Mondary Gee

== Final roster ==
2020 Tennessee Titans roster
Quarterbacks (QB): 17 Ryan Tannehill; 5 Logan Woodside; Running backs (RB): 41 Khari Blasingame FB; 32 Darrynton Evans; 45 D'Onta Foreman; 22 Derrick Henry; 28 Jeremy McNichols; 20 Senorise Perry; Wide receivers (WR): 13 Cameron Batson; 11 A. J. Brown; 84 Corey Davis; 14 Kalif Raymond; 15 Nick Westbrook-Ikhine; Tight ends (TE): 86 Anthony Firkser; 85 MyCole Pruitt; 81 Jonnu Smith; 87 Geoff Swaim	Offensive linemen (OL): 64 Nate Davis G; 75 Jamil Douglas G; 60 Ben Jones C; 71 Dennis Kelly T; 52 Daniel Munyer C; 78 Marshall Newhouse T; 72 David Quessenberry G; 76 Rodger Saffold G; Defensive linemen (DL): 94 Jack Crawford DE; 92 Matt Dickerson DE; 90 DaQuan Jones NT; 91 Larrell Murchison DE; 98 Jeffery Simmons DE	Linebackers (LB): 56 Daren Bates ILB; 53 Will Compton ILB; 49 Nick Dzubnar ILB; 54 Rashaan Evans ILB; 58 Harold Landry OLB; 51 David Long Jr. ILB; 57 Wyatt Ray OLB; 42 Brooks Reed OLB; 50 Derick Roberson OLB; Defensive backs (DB): 21 Malcolm Butler CB; 31 Kevin Byard FS; 26 Kristian Fulton CB; 37 Amani Hooker FS; 25 Adoree' Jackson CB; 35 Chris Jackson CB; 46 Joshua Kalu SS; 33 Desmond King CB; 36 Kareem Orr CB; 23 Tye Smith CB; 24 Kenny Vaccaro SS; Special teams (ST): 3 Stephen Gostkowski K; 6 Brett Kern P; 47 Matt Overton LS	Practice squad: 73 Paul Adams T; 95 Miles Brown NT; 12 Trevor Daniel P; 83 Parker Hesse TE; 16 Cody Hollister WR; 89 Tommy Hudson TE; 88 Marcus Johnson WR; 66 Brandon Kemp T; 4 DeShone Kizer QB; 8 Tucker McCann K (PS/I); -- Nate Orchard OLB; 44 Matthew Orzech LS; 80 Chester Rogers WR; 59 Tuzar Skipper LB; 2 Sam Sloman K; Reserve: 62 Aaron Brewer C (COVID-19); 55 Jayon Brown ILB (IR); 39 Breon Borders CB (IR); 99 Jadeveon Clowney OLB (IR); 29 Dane Cruikshank FS (IR); 10 Adam Humphries WR (IR); 77 Taylor Lewan T (IR); 61 Anthony McKinney T (Opt-out); 30 Christopher Milton CB (IR); 70 Ty Sambrailo T (IR); 93 Teair Tart NT (COVID-19); 79 Isaiah Wilson T (NF-Inj.); Rookies in italics 51 active, 12 reserve, 16 practice squad (1 exempt)

=== Team captains ===
- Ryan Tannehill (QB)
- Derrick Henry (RB)
- DaQuan Jones (NT)
- Kevin Byard (FS)
- Brett Kern (P)

== Preseason ==
The Titans' preseason schedule was announced on May 7, but was later cancelled due to the COVID-19 pandemic.

Week	Date	Opponent	Venue	Result
1	August 15	at Washington Football Team	FedExField	Cancelled due to the COVID-19 pandemic
2	August 22	New York Giants	Nissan Stadium	Cancelled due to the COVID-19 pandemic
3	August 29	at Tampa Bay Buccaneers	Raymond James Stadium	Cancelled due to the COVID-19 pandemic
4	September 3	Chicago Bears	Nissan Stadium	Cancelled due to the COVID-19 pandemic

== Regular season ==
=== Schedule ===
The Titans' 2020 schedule was announced on May 7.

Week	Date	Opponent	Result	Record	Venue	Recap
1	September 14	at Denver Broncos	**W** 16–14	1–0	Empower Field at Mile High	Recap
2	September 20	**Jacksonville Jaguars**	**W** 33–30	2–0	Nissan Stadium	Recap
3	September 27	at Minnesota Vikings	**W** 31–30	3–0	U.S. Bank Stadium	Recap
4	Bye (Note: Due to a COVID-19 outbreak within the Titans' organization, the Titans' game vs. the Pittsburgh Steelers, originally scheduled during Week 4 (October 4), was moved to Week 7 (October 25), which originally would have been the Titans' bye week.)					
5 (Note: The Titans' Week 5 game vs. the Buffalo Bills was rescheduled from October 11 to October 13—contingent on no more positive COVID-19 tests from the Titans.)	October 13	Buffalo Bills	**W** 42–16	4–0	Nissan Stadium	Recap
6	October 18	**Houston Texans**	**W** 42–36 (OT)	5–0	Nissan Stadium	Recap
7	October 25	Pittsburgh Steelers	**L** 24–27	5–1	Nissan Stadium	Recap
8	November 1	at Cincinnati Bengals	**L** 20–31	5–2	Paul Brown Stadium	Recap
9	November 8	Chicago Bears	**W** 24–17	6–2	Nissan Stadium	Recap
10	November 12	**Indianapolis Colts**	**L** 17–34	6–3	Nissan Stadium	Recap
11	November 22	at Baltimore Ravens	**W** 30–24 (OT)	7–3	M&T Bank Stadium	Recap
12	November 29	at **Indianapolis Colts**	**W** 45–26	8–3	Lucas Oil Stadium	Recap
13	December 6	Cleveland Browns	**L** 35–41	8–4	Nissan Stadium	Recap
14	December 13	at **Jacksonville Jaguars**	**W** 31–10	9–4	TIAA Bank Field	Recap
15	December 20	Detroit Lions	**W** 46–25	10–4	Nissan Stadium	Recap
16	December 27	at Green Bay Packers	**L** 14–40	10–5	Lambeau Field	Recap
17	January 3	at **Houston Texans**	**W** 41–38	11–5	NRG Stadium	Recap

Note: Intra-division opponents are in bold text.

=== Game summaries ===
==== Week 1: at Denver Broncos ====
Week One: Tennessee Titans at Denver Broncos – Game summary

Quarter	1	2	3	4	Total
**Titans**	0	7	0	9	**16**
Broncos	7	0	0	7	**14**

at Empower Field at Mile High, Denver, Colorado

- Date: September 14
- Game time: 9:10 p.m. CDT/8:10 p.m. MDT
- Game weather: Mostly clear, 79 °F (26 °C)
- Game attendance: 0
- Referee: Scott Novak
- TV announcers (ESPN): Steve Levy, Brian Griese, Louis Riddick and Lisa Salters
- Recap, Game Book

Game information

**First quarter**

- DEN – Noah Fant 9-yard pass from Drew Lock (Brandon McManus kick), 0:26. Broncos 7–0. **Drive: 10 plays, 63 yards, 4:57.**

**Second quarter**

- TEN – MyCole Pruitt 1-yard pass from Ryan Tannehill (Stephen Gostkowski kick), 9:21. Tied 7–7. **Drive: 5 plays, 23 yards, 2:23.**

**Third quarter**

- No scoring plays.

**Fourth quarter**

- TEN – Jonnu Smith 1-yard pass from Ryan Tannehill (kick failed), 13:49. Titans 13–7. **Drive: 15 plays, 82 yards, 7:02.**
- DEN – Melvin Gordon 1-yard run (Brandon McManus kick), 9:08. Broncos 14–13. **Drive: 9 plays, 75 yards, 4:41.**
- TEN – Stephen Gostkowski 25-yard field goal, 0:17. Titans 16–14. **Drive: 12 plays, 83 yards, 2:48.**

**Top passers**

- TEN – Ryan Tannehill – 29/43, 249 yards, 2 TD
- DEN – Drew Lock – 22/33, 216 yards, TD

**Top rushers**

- TEN – Derrick Henry – 31 rushes, 116 yards
- DEN – Melvin Gordon – 15 rushes, 78 yards, TD

**Top receivers**

- TEN – Corey Davis – 7 receptions, 101 yards
- DEN – Noah Fant – 5 receptions, 81 yards, TD

==== Week 2: vs. Jacksonville Jaguars ====
Week Two: Jacksonville Jaguars at Tennessee Titans – Game summary

Quarter	1	2	3	4	Total
Jaguars	7	3	7	13	**30**
**Titans**	14	10	6	3	**33**

at Nissan Stadium, Nashville, Tennessee

- Date: September 20
- Game time: 12:00 p.m. CDT
- Game weather: Sunny, 72 °F (22 °C)
- Game attendance: 7
- Referee: Clay Martin
- TV announcers (CBS): Andrew Catalon, James Lofton and A.J. Ross
- Recap, Game Book

Game information

**First quarter**

- TEN – Jonnu Smith 13-yard pass from Ryan Tannehill (Stephen Gostkowski kick), 13:22. Titans 7–0. **Drive: 3 plays, 77 yards, 1:38.**
- TEN – Corey Davis 9-yard pass from Ryan Tannehill (Stephen Gostkowski kick), 5:43. Titans 14–0. **Drive: 5 plays, 30 yards, 1:56.**
- JAX – Tyler Eifert 19-yard pass from Gardner Minshew (Josh Lambo kick), 3:43. Titans 14–7. **Drive: 6 plays, 75 yards, 2:00.**

**Second quarter**

- TEN – Jonnu Smith 4-yard pass from Ryan Tannehill (Stephen Gostkowski kick), 1:47. Titans 21–7. **Drive: 3 plays, 77 yards, 5:50.**
- JAX – Josh Lambo 35-yard field goal, 0:12. Titans 21–10. **Drive: 10 plays, 58 yards, 1:35.**
- TEN – Stephen Gostkowski 51-yard field goal, 0:00. Titans 24–10. **Drive: 2 plays, 16 yards, 0:12.**

**Third quarter**

- JAX – James Robinson 17-yard run (Josh Lambo kick), 7:04. Titans 24–17. **Drive: 14 plays, 89 yards, 7:56.**
- TEN – Adam Humphries 18-yard pass from Ryan Tannehill (kick failed), 2:04. Titans 30–17. **Drive: 9 plays, 75 yards, 5:00.**

**Fourth quarter**

- JAX – Keelan Cole 2-yard pass from Gardner Minshew (kick failed), 14:16. Titans 30–23. **Drive: 7 plays, 75 yards, 2:48.**
- JAX – Chris Thompson 14-yard pass from Gardner Minshew (Josh Lambo kick), 7:25. Tied 30–30. **Drive: 9 plays, 86 yards, 5:02.**
- TEN – Stephen Gostkowski 49-yard field goal, 1:36. Titans 33–30. **Drive: 8 plays, 29 yards, 1:53.**

**Top passers**

- JAX – Gardner Minshew – 30/45, 339 yards, 3 TD, 2 INT
- TEN – Ryan Tannehill – 18/24, 239 yards, 4 TD

**Top rushers**

- JAX – James Robinson – 16 rushes, 102 yards, TD
- TEN – Derrick Henry – 24 rushes, 84 yards

**Top receivers**

- JAX – D. J. Chark – 4 receptions, 84 yards
- TEN – Jonnu Smith – 4 receptions, 84 yards, 2 TD

==== Week 3: at Minnesota Vikings ====
Week Three: Tennessee Titans at Minnesota Vikings – Game summary

Quarter	1	2	3	4	Total
**Titans**	6	3	16	6	**31**
Vikings	7	10	7	6	**30**

at U.S. Bank Stadium, Minneapolis, Minnesota

- Date: September 27
- Game time: 12:00 p.m. CDT
- Game weather: None (indoor stadium)
- Game attendance: 0
- Referee: Clete Blakeman
- TV announcers (CBS): Andrew Catalon, James Lofton and A.J. Ross
- Recap, Game Book

Game information

**First quarter**

- TEN – Stephen Gostkowski 39-yard field goal, 11:44. Titans 3–0. **Drive: 6 plays, 54 yards, 3:16.**
- TEN – Stephen Gostkowski 31-yard field goal, 6:01. Titans 6–0. **Drive: 4 plays, 7 yards, 0:52.**
- MIN – Dalvin Cook 39-yard run (Dan Bailey kick), 2:43. Vikings 7–6. **Drive: 7 plays, 76 yards, 3:18.**

**Second quarter**

- MIN – Adam Thielen 16-yard pass from Kirk Cousins (Dan Bailey kick), 8:56. Vikings 14–6. **Drive: 10 plays, 88 yards, 5:52.**
- TEN – Stephen Gostkowski 30-yard field goal, 3:18. Vikings 14–9. **Drive: 12 plays, 63 yards, 5:38.**
- MIN – Dan Bailey 41-yard field goal, 1:41. Vikings 17–9. **Drive: 7 plays, 52 yards, 1:37.**

**Third quarter**

- TEN – Stephen Gostkowski 51-yard field goal, 8:57. Vikings 17–12. **Drive: 5 plays, 28 yards, 1:18.**
- MIN – Justin Jefferson 71-yard pass from Kirk Cousins (Dan Bailey kick), 8:04. Vikings 24–12. **Drive: 2 plays, 73 yards, 0:53.**
- TEN – Derrick Henry 1-yard run (Stephen Gostkowski kick), 3:53. Vikings 24–19. **Drive: 8 plays, 75 yards, 4:11.**
- TEN – Derrick Henry 1-yard run (pass failed), 1:22. Titans 25–24. **Drive: 3 plays, 65 yards, 1:17.**

**Fourth quarter**

- MIN – Kyle Rudolph 3-yard pass from Kirk Cousins (pass failed), 10:17. Vikings 30–25. **Drive: 10 plays, 75 yards, 6:05.**
- TEN – Stephen Gostkowski 54-yard field goal, 6:31. Vikings 30–28. **Drive: 10 plays, 39 yards, 3:46.**
- TEN – Stephen Gostkowski 55-yard field goal, 1:44. Titans 31–30. **Drive: 9 plays, 44 yards, 1:58.**

**Top passers**

- TEN – Ryan Tannehill – 23/37, 321 yards, INT
- MIN – Kirk Cousins – 16/27, 251 yards, 3 TD, 2 INT

**Top rushers**

- TEN – Derrick Henry – 26 rushes, 119 yards, 2 TD
- MIN – Dalvin Cook – 22 rushes, 181 yards, TD

**Top receivers**

- TEN – Kalif Raymond – 3 receptions, 118 yards
- MIN – Justin Jefferson – 7 receptions, 175 yards, TD

Stephen Gostkowski kicked a career-high 6 field goals, including 3 from 50+ yards, as the Titans would win another close game against the Vikings.

==== Week 5: vs. Buffalo Bills ====
Week Five: Buffalo Bills at Tennessee Titans – Game summary

Quarter	1	2	3	4	Total
Bills	7	3	0	6	**16**
**Titans**	7	14	7	14	**42**

at Nissan Stadium, Nashville, Tennessee

- Date: October 13
- Game time: 6:00 p.m. CDT
- Game weather: Sunny, 73 °F (23 °C)
- Game attendance: 8,403
- Referee: Brad Rogers
- TV announcers (CBS): Tom McCarthy, Jay Feely and AJ Ross
- Recap, Game Book

Game information

**First quarter**

- TEN – AJ Brown 16-yard pass from Ryan Tannehill (Stephen Gostkowski kick), 12:45. Titans 7–0. **Drive: 2 plays, 16 yards, 0:44.**
- BUF – Isaiah McKenzie 3-yard pass from Josh Allen (Tyler Bass kick), 6:02. Tied 7–7. **Drive: 15 plays, 76 yards, 6:43.**

**Second quarter**

- TEN – Derrick Henry 1-yard run (Stephen Gostkowski kick), 13:54. Titans 14–7. **Drive: 7 plays, 30 yards, 3:05.**
- BUF – Tyler Bass 43-yard field goal, 8:35. Titans 14–10. **Drive: 10 plays, 50 yards, 5:19.**
- TEN – Ryan Tannehill 10-yard run (Stephen Gostkowski kick), 0:16. Titans 21–10. **Drive: 12 plays, 90 yards, 2:39.**

**Third quarter**

- TEN – Jonnu Smith 4-yard pass from Ryan Tannehill (Stephen Gostkowski kick), 1:49. Titans 28–10. **Drive: 3 plays, 12 yards, 1:16.**

**Fourth quarter**

- BUF – T. J. Yeldon 22-yard pass from Josh Allen (pass failed), 10:00. Titans 28–16. **Drive: 14 plays, 90 yards, 6:49.**
- TEN – Derrick Henry 9-yard run (Stephen Gostkowski kick), 3:57. Titans 35–16. **Drive: 11 plays, 75 yards, 6:03.**
- TEN – Jonnu Smith 7-yard pass from Ryan Tannehill (Stephen Gostkowski kick), 1:59. Titans 42–16. **Drive: 6 plays, 18 yards, 1:50.**

**Top passers**

- BUF – Josh Allen – 26/41, 263 yards, 2 TD, 2 INT
- TEN – Ryan Tannehill – 21/28, 195 yards, 3 TD

**Top rushers**

- BUF – T. J. Yeldon – 7 rushes, 52 yards
- TEN – Derrick Henry – 19 rushes, 57 yards, 2 TD

**Top receivers**

- BUF – Stefon Diggs – 10 receptions, 106 yards
- TEN – AJ Brown – 7 receptions, 82 yards, TD

The Titans ended an unplanned two-week hiatus and a three-game losing streak to the Bills, their most recent previous win coming in a 35-34 win at Buffalo in 2012. Ryan Tannehill exceeded 100 in passer rating (129.3) for the second time to date in the season.

==== Week 6: vs. Houston Texans ====
Week Six: Houston Texans at Tennessee Titans – Game summary

Quarter	1	2	3	4	OT	Total
Texans	0	10	13	13	0	**36**
**Titans**	14	7	0	15	6	**42**

at Nissan Stadium, Nashville, Tennessee

- Date: October 18
- Game time: 12:00 p.m. CDT
- Game weather: Cloudy, 61 °F (16 °C)
- Game attendance: 10,166
- Referee: Alex Kemp
- TV announcers (CBS): Greg Gumbel, Rich Gannon and Jay Feely
- Recap, Game Book

Game information

**First quarter**

- TEN – Anthony Firkser 7-yard pass from Ryan Tannehill (Stephen Gostkowski kick), 6:57. Titans 7–0. **Drive: 6 plays, 82 yards, 3:30.**
- TEN – AJ Brown 6-yard pass from Ryan Tannehill (Stephen Gostkowski kick), 0:12. Titans 14–0. **Drive: 10 plays, 71 yards, 5:14.**

**Second quarter**

- HOU – Darren Fells 1-yard pass from Deshaun Watson (Kaʻimi Fairbairn kick), 8:56. Titans 14–7. **Drive: 13 plays, 82 yards, 6:16.**
- TEN – Adam Humphries 22-yard pass from Ryan Tannehill (Stephen Gostkowski kick), 3:34. Titans 21–7. **Drive: 11 plays, 85 yards, 5:22.**
- HOU – Kaʻimi Fairbairn 38-yard field goal, 0:00. Titans 21–10. **Drive: 11 plays, 55 yards, 3:14.**

**Third quarter**

- HOU – David Johnson 1-yard run (Kaʻimi Fairbairn kick), 6:15. Titans 21–17. **Drive: 5 plays, 79 yards, 2:32.**
- HOU – Randall Cobb 4-yard pass from Deshaun Watson (Kaʻimi Fairbairn kick no good, wl), 4:35. Texans 23–21. **Drive: 3 plays, 4 yards, 1:22.**

**Fourth quarter**

- TEN – Derrick Henry 94-yard run (R. Tannehill-N. Westbrook-Ikhine pass), 9:23. Titans 29–23. **Drive: 1 play, 94 yards, 0:14.**
- HOU – Will Fuller 53-yard pass from Deshaun Watson (Kaʻimi Fairbairn kick), 8:37. Texans 30–29. **Drive: 2 plays, 75 yards, 0:46.**
- HOU – Brandin Cooks 1-yard pass from Deshaun Watson (pass failed), 1:50. Texans 36–29. **Drive: 15 plays, 69 yards, 6:40.**
- TEN – AJ Brown 7-yard pass from Ryan Tannehill (Stephen Gostkowski kick), 0:04. Tied 36–36. **Drive: 9 plays, 76 yards, 1:46.**

**Overtime**

- TEN – Derrick Henry 5-yard run, 6:30. Titans 42–36. **Drive: 6 plays, 82 yards, 3:30.**

**Top passers**

- HOU – Deshaun Watson – 28/37, 335 yards, 4 TD
- TEN – Ryan Tannehill – 30/41, 364 yards, 4 TD, INT

**Top rushers**

- HOU – David Johnson – 19 rushes, 57 yards, TD
- TEN – Derrick Henry – 22 rushes, 212 yards, 2 TD

**Top receivers**

- HOU – Will Fuller – 6 receptions, 123 yards, TD
- TEN – Anthony Firkser – 8 receptions, 113 yards, TD

The former Houston Oilers reached 5-0 for the second time in club history in what to that point was the highest-scoring (78 combined points) and most competitive game in their sibling-esque rivalry with the present day NFL club of Houston. Behind four Deshaun Watson scores, the Texans erased an early 14-point deficit to lead 36-29 late in the fourth quarter, but Ryan Tannehill completed eight straight passes, ending in a seven-yard touchdown to A. J. Brown, to tie the game in the final seconds of the fourth quarter. In overtime, the Titans advanced 82 yards on six plays and Derrick Henry scored on a direct snap play to win the game 42–36. The Titans' 607 total yards of offense were the most of any team all season.

==== Week 7: vs. Pittsburgh Steelers ====
Week Seven: Pittsburgh Steelers at Tennessee Titans – Game summary

Quarter	1	2	3	4	Total
**Steelers**	7	17	3	0	**27**
Titans	0	7	10	7	**24**

at Nissan Stadium, Nashville, Tennessee

- Date: October 25
- Game time: 12:00 p.m. CDT
- Game weather: Cloudy, 55 °F (13 °C)
- Game attendance: 10,355
- Referee: Shawn Hochuli
- TV announcers (CBS): Ian Eagle, Charles Davis and Evan Washburn
- Recap, Game Book

Game information

**First quarter**

- PIT – Diontae Johnson 11-yard pass from Ben Roethlisberger (Chris Boswell kick), 5:42. Steelers 7–0. **Drive: 16 plays, 75 yards, 9:18.**

**Second quarter**

- PIT – Benny Snell 1-yard run (Chris Boswell kick), 5:26. Steelers 14–0. **Drive: 13 plays, 61 yards, 7:05.**
- TEN – Corey Davis 4-yard pass from Ryan Tannehill (Stephen Gostkowski kick), 2:50. Steelers 14–7. **Drive: 12 plays, 75 yards, 6:50.**
- PIT – Chris Boswell 38-yard field goal, 2:50. Steelers 17–7. **Drive: 7 plays, 55 yards, 2:36.**
- PIT – Diontae Johnson 9-yard pass from Ben Roethlisberger (Chris Boswell kick), 0:52. Steelers 24–7. **Drive: 3 plays, 17 yards, 0:43.**

**Third quarter**

- PIT – Chris Boswell 30-yard field goal, 10:26. Steelers 27–7. **Drive: 7 plays, 54 yards, 2:53.**
- TEN – A. J. Brown 73-yard pass from Ryan Tannehill (Stephen Gostkowski kick), 9:36. Steelers 27–14. **Drive: 2 plays, 75 yards, 0:50.**
- TEN – Stephen Gostkowski 51-yard field goal, 2:55. Steelers 27–17. **Drive: 4 plays, -3 yards, 0:49.**

**Fourth quarter**

- TEN – Derrick Henry 1-yard run (Stephen Gostkowski kick), 10:13. Steelers 27–24. **Drive: 12 plays, 70 yards, 5:25.**

**Top passers**

- PIT – Ben Roethlisberger – 32/49, 268 yards, 2 TD, 3 INT
- TEN – Ryan Tannehill – 18/30, 220 yards, 2 TD

**Top rushers**

- PIT – James Conner – 20 rushes, 82 yards
- TEN – Derrick Henry – 20 rushes, 75 yards, TD

**Top receivers**

- PIT – JuJu Smith-Schuster – 9 receptions, 85 yards
- TEN – A. J. Brown – 6 receptions, 153 yards, TD

The game was originally scheduled for Sunday, October 4 at 1:00 p.m. but was postponed due to the Titans and Minnesota Vikings suspending in-person team activities due to several positive COVID-19 tests from Tennessee in the aftermath of the Titans–Vikings game.

The Titans rallied back after falling behind 27–7, scoring 17 unanswered points in the 3rd and 4th quarters. However, with 19 seconds left in the 4th quarter, kicker Stephen Gostkowski missed what would have been a game-tying 45-yard field goal to send the game into overtime, sealing the Titans' first loss of the season and extending their losing streak against the Steelers to three games, dating back to Week 11 of the 2014 season.

==== Week 8: at Cincinnati Bengals ====
Week Eight: Tennessee Titans at Cincinnati Bengals – Game summary

Quarter	1	2	3	4	Total
Titans	0	7	0	13	**20**
**Bengals**	3	14	0	14	**31**

at Paul Brown Stadium, Cincinnati, Ohio

- Date: November 1
- Game time: 1:00 p.m. EST/12:00 p.m. CST
- Game weather: Sunny, 48 °F (9 °C)
- Game attendance: 9,712
- Referee: Scott Novak
- TV announcers (CBS): Spero Dedes and Adam Archuleta
- Recap, Game Book

Game information

**First quarter**

- CIN – Randy Bullock 33-yard field goal, 9:48. Bengals 3–0. **Drive: 12 plays, 57 yards, 5:12.**

**Second quarter**

- CIN – Samaje Perine 1-yard run (Randy Bullock kick), 10:26. Bengals 10–0. **Drive: 9 plays, 57 yards, 4:59.**
- TEN – Derrick Henry 3-yard run (Stephen Gostkowski kick), 6:04. Bengals 10–7. **Drive: 10 plays, 75 yards, 4:22.**
- CIN – Giovani Bernard 12-yard run (Randy Bullock kick), 0:32. Bengals 17–7. **Drive: 9 plays, 73 yards, 5:32.**

**Third quarter**

- No scoring plays.

**Fourth quarter**

- CIN – Tyler Boyd 7-yard pass from Joe Burrow (Randy Bullock kick), 13:55. Bengals 24–7. **Drive: 12 plays, 86 yards, 5:37.**
- TEN – A. J. Brown 9-yard pass from Ryan Tannehill (Stephen Gostkowski kick), 11:20. Bengals 24–14. **Drive: 9 plays, 75 yards, 2:35.**
- CIN – Giovani Bernard 6-yard pass from Joe Burrow (Randy Bullock kick), 7:30. Bengals 31–14. **Drive: 7 plays, 44 yards, 3:50.**
- TEN – Corey Davis 12-yard pass from Ryan Tannehill (pass failed), 5:56. Bengals 31–20. **Drive: 6 plays, 75 yards, 1:34.**

**Top passers**

- TEN – Ryan Tannehill – 18/30, 233 yards, 2 TD, INT
- CIN – Joe Burrow – 26/37, 249 yards, 2 TD

**Top rushers**

- TEN – Derrick Henry – 18 rushes, 112 yards, TD
- CIN – Giovani Bernard – 15 rushes, 62 yards, TD

**Top receivers**

- TEN – Corey Davis – 8 receptions, 128 yards, TD
- CIN – Tee Higgins – 6 receptions, 78 yards

The Titans suffered their fifth loss to the Bengals in nine meetings since the two teams were split out of the former AFC Central in 2002.

==== Week 9: vs. Chicago Bears ====
Week Nine: Chicago Bears at Tennessee Titans – Game summary

Quarter	1	2	3	4	Total
Bears	0	0	0	17	**17**
**Titans**	3	7	7	7	**24**

at Nissan Stadium, Nashville, Tennessee

- Date: November 8
- Game time: 12:00 p.m. CST
- Game weather: Sunny, 77 °F (25 °C)
- Game attendance: 13,871
- Referee: Ronald Torbert
- TV announcers (Fox): Dick Stockton, Greg Jennings and Laura Okmin
- Recap, Game Book

Game information

**First quarter**

- TEN – Stephen Gostkowski 40-yard field goal, 4:22. Titans 3–0. **Drive: 8 plays, 56 yards, 4:09.**

**Second quarter**

- TEN – A. J. Brown 40-yard pass from Ryan Tannehill (Stephen Gostkowski kick), 4:39. Titans 10–0. **Drive: 12 plays, 91 yards, 6:10.**

**Third quarter**

- TEN – Desmond King 63-yard fumble return (Stephen Gostkowski kick), 4:41. Titans 17–0.

**Fourth quarter**

- CHI – Cairo Santos 22-yard field goal, 12:30. Titans 17–3. **Drive: 15 plays, 63 yards, 7:11.**
- TEN – Jonnu Smith 2-yard pass from Ryan Tannehill (Stephen Gostkowski kick), 8:10. Titans 24–3. **Drive: 7 plays, 76 yards, 4:20.**
- CHI – Ryan Nall 6-yard pass from Nick Foles (Cairo Santos kick), 5:06. Titans 24–10. **Drive: 9 plays, 75 yards, 3:04.**
- CHI – Jimmy Graham 8-yard pass from Nick Foles (Cairo Santos kick), 1:04. Titans 24–17. **Drive: 8 plays, 80 yards, 0:58.**

**Top passers**

- CHI – Nick Foles – 36/52, 335 yards, 2 TD
- TEN – Ryan Tannehill – 10/21, 158 yards, 2 TD

**Top rushers**

- CHI – David Montgomery – 14 rushes, 30 yards
- TEN – Derrick Henry – 21 rushes, 68 yards

**Top receivers**

- CHI – Allen Robinson – 7 receptions, 81 yards
- TEN – A. J. Brown – 4 receptions, 101 yards, TD

The Titans ended their two-game slide by edging the Bears (the team where their former head coach Jeff Fisher both played and began his coaching career) despite being limited to 228 yards of total offense. Ryan Tannehill completed just ten of 21 passes but two were touchdowns including a spirited 40-yard score to A. J. Brown. Desmond King also scored when he recovered a fumble and ran in 63 yards.

==== Week 10: vs. Indianapolis Colts ====
Week Ten: Indianapolis Colts at Tennessee Titans – Game summary

Quarter	1	2	3	4	Total
**Colts**	3	10	14	7	**34**
Titans	7	10	0	0	**17**

at Nissan Stadium, Nashville, Tennessee

- Date: November 12
- Game time: 7:20 p.m. CST
- Game weather: Clear, 56 °F (13 °C)
- Game attendance: 13,949
- Referee: Brad Allen
- TV announcers (Fox/NFLN/Amazon Prime): Joe Buck, Troy Aikman, Erin Andrews and Kristina Pink
- Recap, Game Book

Game information

**First quarter**

- TEN – D'Onta Foreman 5-yard pass from Ryan Tannehill (Stephen Gostkowski kick), 11:50. Titans 7–0. **Drive: 6 plays, 67 yards, 3:10.**
- IND – Rodrigo Blankenship 24-yard field goal, 0:36. Titans 7–3. **Drive: 11 plays, 69 yards, 4:30.**

**Second quarter**

- TEN – Stephen Gostkowski 50-yard field goal, 11:12. Titans 10–3. **Drive: 8 plays, 43 yards, 4:24.**
- IND – Nyheim Hines 13-yard pass from Philip Rivers (Rodrigo Blankenship kick), 7:49. Tied 10–10. **Drive: 8 plays, 80 yards, 3:23.**
- TEN – Jonnu Smith 1-yard run (Stephen Gostkowski kick), 2:54. Titans 17–10. **Drive: 9 plays, 75 yards, 4:55.**
- IND – Rodrigo Blankenship 43-yard field goal, 0:00. Titans 17–13. **Drive: 13 plays, 51 yards, 2:54.**

**Third quarter**

- IND – Nyheim Hines 2-yard run (Rodrigo Blankenship kick), 2:51. Colts 20–17. **Drive: 4 plays, 27 yards, 1:18.**
- IND – T. J. Carrie 6-yard return of blocked punt (Rodrigo Blankenship kick), 1:52. Colts 27–17.

**Fourth quarter**

- IND – Jacoby Brissett 2-yard run (Rodrigo Blankenship kick), 9:21. Colts 34–17. **Drive: 4 plays, 66 yards, 2:50.**

**Top passers**

- IND – Philip Rivers – 29/39, 308 yards, TD
- TEN – Ryan Tannehill – 15/27, 158 yards, TD

**Top rushers**

- IND – Nyheim Hines – 12 rushes, 70 yards, TD
- TEN – Derrick Henry – 19 rushes, 103 yards

**Top receivers**

- IND – Michael Pittman Jr. – 7 receptions, 101 yards
- TEN – Corey Davis – 5 receptions, 67 yards

The Colts scored on a 24-yard drive following a poor Titans punt then scored again on a blocked punt. This was Indianapolis’ third straight win at Nissan Stadium.

==== Week 11: at Baltimore Ravens ====
Week Eleven: Tennessee Titans at Baltimore Ravens – Game summary

Quarter	1	2	3	4	OT	Total
**Titans**	7	3	3	11	6	**30**
Ravens	3	11	7	3	0	**24**

at M&T Bank Stadium, Baltimore, Maryland

- Date: November 22
- Game time: 1:00 p.m. EST/12:00 p.m. CST
- Game weather: Cloudy, 53 °F (12 °C)
- Game attendance: 0
- Referee: Alex Kemp
- TV announcers (CBS): Jim Nantz, Tony Romo and Tracy Wolfson
- Recap, Game Book

Game information

**First quarter**

- TEN – Jonnu Smith 1-yard pass from Ryan Tannehill (Stephen Gostkowski kick), 8:37. Titans 7–0. **Drive: 9 plays, 79 yards, 5:16.**
- BAL – Justin Tucker 30-yard field goal, 1:50. Titans 7–3. **Drive: 13 plays, 63 yards, 6:47.**

**Second quarter**

- BAL – Justin Tucker 27-yard field goal, 11:05. Titans 7–6. **Drive: 7 plays, 13 yards, 3:03.**
- BAL – J. K. Dobbins 2-yard run (Lamar Jackson–J. K. Dobbins pass), 5:17. Ravens 14–7. **Drive: 9 plays, 60 yards, 4:08.**
- TEN – Stephen Gostkowski 40-yard field goal, 0:48. Ravens 14–10. **Drive: 14 plays, 53 yards, 4:29.**

**Third quarter**

- BAL – Mark Andrews 31-yard pass from Lamar Jackson (Justin Tucker kick), 9:34. Ravens 21–10. **Drive: 7 plays, 74 yards, 3:52.**
- TEN – Stephen Gostkowski 40-yard field goal, 5:33. Ravens 21–13. **Drive: 8 plays, 53 yards, 4:01.**

**Fourth quarter**

- TEN – Stephen Gostkowski 22-yard field goal, 11:12. Ravens 21–16. **Drive: 12 plays, 81 yards, 5:34.**
- TEN – A. J. Brown 14-yard pass from Ryan Tannehill (Ryan Tannehill rush), 2:18. Titans 24–21. **Drive: 10 plays, 90 yards, 5:25.**
- BAL – Justin Tucker 29-yard field goal, 0:15. Tied 24–24. **Drive: 9 plays, 65 yards, 2:03.**

**Overtime**

- TEN – Derrick Henry 29-yard run, 5:21. Titans 30–24. **Drive: 6 plays, 73 yards, 2:37.**

**Top passers**

- TEN – Ryan Tannehill – 22/31, 259 yards, 2 TD, INT
- BAL – Lamar Jackson – 17/29, 186 yards, TD, INT

**Top rushers**

- TEN – Derrick Henry – 28 rushes, 133 yards, TD
- BAL – J. K. Dobbins – 15 rushes, 70 yards, TD

**Top receivers**

- TEN – Corey Davis – 5 receptions, 113 yards
- BAL – Mark Andrews – 5 receptions, 96 yards, TD

In what turned out to be a playoff preview, the Titans rallied to beat the Ravens in overtime in a game in which the referees had to break up a pregame argument between Ravens head coach John Harbaugh and Titans cornerback Malcolm Butler; a similar scenario occurred involving Harbaugh and Mike Vrabel. Mark Andrews’ 31-yard score put Baltimore up 21–10, but two Stephen Gostkowski field goals (the second came after Lamar Jackson was intercepted at the Titans' 9-yard line) were followed by a bulling 14-yard touchdown catch by A. J. Brown and a Ryan Tannehill two-point run to give Tennessee the lead, 24–21. Jackson threw for 48 yards and rushed for 22 for the game-tying field goal, but in overtime, Tannehill completed three passes for 36 yards before Derrick Henry tore through for the 29-yard touchdown to seal the game, 30–24.

==== Week 12: at Indianapolis Colts ====
Week Twelve: Tennessee Titans at Indianapolis Colts – Game summary

Quarter	1	2	3	4	Total
**Titans**	14	21	3	7	**45**
Colts	7	7	0	12	**26**

at Lucas Oil Stadium, Indianapolis, Indiana

- Date: November 29
- Game time: 1:00 p.m. EST/12:00 p.m. CST
- Game weather: None (retractable roof closed)
- Game attendance: 12,464
- Referee: John Hussey
- TV announcers (CBS): Ian Eagle, Charles Davis and Evan Washburn
- Recap, Game Book

Game information

**First quarter**

- TEN – Derrick Henry 12-yard run (Stephen Gostkowski kick), 9:12. Titans 7–0. **Drive: 10 plays, 75 yards, 5:48.**
- IND – Trey Burton 11-yard pass from Philip Rivers (Rodrigo Blankenship kick), 2:34. Tied 7–7. **Drive: 12 plays, 75 yards, 6:38.**
- TEN – A. J. Brown 69-yard pass from Ryan Tannehill (Stephen Gostkowski kick), 0:09. Titans 14–7. **Drive: 4 plays, 75 yards, 2:25.**

**Second quarter**

- IND – Jacoby Brissett 1-yard run (Rodrigo Blankenship kick), 12:51. Tied 14–14. **Drive: 6 plays, 75 yards, 2:18.**
- TEN – Derrick Henry 1-yard run (Stephen Gostkowski kick), 6:15. Titans 21–14. **Drive: 8 plays, 65 yards, 3:29.**
- TEN – Derrick Henry 11-yard run (Stephen Gostkowski kick), 1:41. Titans 28–14. **Drive: 9 plays, 86 yards, 2:44.**
- TEN – Ryan Tannehill 1-yard run (Stephen Gostkowski kick), 0:20. Titans 35–14. **Drive: 5 plays, 44 yards, 0:53.**

**Third quarter**

- TEN – Stephen Gostkowski 49-yard field goal, 0:44. Titans 38–14. **Drive: 8 plays, 32 yards, 4:54.**

**Fourth quarter**

- IND – Jacoby Brissett 1-yard run (run failed), 13:23. Titans 38–20. **Drive: 9 plays, 75 yards, 2:21.**
- IND – T. Y. Hilton 5-yard pass from Philip Rivers (pass failed), 2:34. Titans 38–26. **Drive: 11 plays, 94 yards, 3:21.**
- TEN – A. J. Brown 42-yard kickoff return (Stephen Gostkowski kick), 2:29. Titans 45–26.

**Top passers**

- TEN – Ryan Tannehill – 13/22, 221 yards, TD
- IND – Philip Rivers – 24/42, 295 yards, 2 TD, INT

**Top rushers**

- TEN – Derrick Henry – 27 rushes, 178 yards, 3 TD
- IND – Nyheim Hines – 10 rushes, 29 yards

**Top receivers**

- TEN – A. J. Brown – 4 receptions, 98 yards, TD
- IND – T. Y. Hilton – 4 receptions, 81 yards, TD

The Titans won at Lucas Oil Stadium for the third time in four trips leading wire to wire against the Colts and reaching eight wins. Derrick Henry erupted to three rushing touchdowns (the first on a lateral from Ryan Tannehill) in the first half, becoming the first player with the club with three rushing scores since Lorenzo White ran in four touchdowns against the Browns in the club's days as the Houston Oilers. A. J. Brown caught a touchdown and also scored when he caught an onside kick by the Colts.

The win marked only the third time in the history of the AFC South (and first time in consecutive seasons) that the road team in the Colts-Titans rivalry won both games.

==== Week 13: vs. Cleveland Browns ====
Week Thirteen: Cleveland Browns at Tennessee Titans – Game summary

Quarter	1	2	3	4	Total
**Browns**	10	28	3	0	**41**
Titans	0	7	14	14	**35**

at Nissan Stadium, Nashville, Tennessee

- Date: December 6
- Game time: 12:00 p.m. CST
- Game weather: Sunny, 52 °F (11 °C)
- Game attendance: 13,986
- Referee: Clete Blakeman
- TV announcers (CBS): Ian Eagle, Charles Davis and Evan Washburn
- Recap, Game Book

Game information

**First quarter**

- CLE – Cody Parkey 27-yard field goal, 10:47. Browns 3–0. **Drive: 8 plays, 66 yards, 4:17.**
- CLE – Jarvis Landry 2-yard pass from Baker Mayfield (Cody Parkey kick), 3:19. Browns 10–0. **Drive: 9 plays, 59 yards, 4:32.**

**Second quarter**

- CLE – Kendall Lamm 1-yard pass from Baker Mayfield (Cody Parkey kick), 14:56. Browns 17–0. **Drive: 6 plays, 21 yards, 3:13.**
- TEN – Corey Davis 17-yard pass from Ryan Tannehill (Stephen Gostkowski kick), 13:14. Browns 17–7. **Drive: 4 plays, 74 yards, 1:42.**
- CLE – Donovan Peoples-Jones 75-yard pass from Baker Mayfield (Cody Parkey kick), 13:04. Browns 24–7. **Drive: 1 play, 75 yards, 0:10.**
- CLE – Rashard Higgins 17-yard pass from Baker Mayfield (Cody Parkey kick), 5:46. Browns 31–7. **Drive: 11 plays, 90 yards, 5:38.**
- CLE – Nick Chubb 1-yard run (Cody Parkey kick), 0:55. Browns 38–7. **Drive: 9 plays, 65 yards, 3:22.**

**Third quarter**

- TEN – MyCole Pruitt 22-yard pass from Ryan Tannehill (run failed), 13:52. Browns 38–13. **Drive: 3 plays, 75 yards, 1:08.**
- TEN – MyCole Pruitt 3-yard fumble recovery (Ryan Tannehill run), 9:15. Browns 38–21. **Drive: 6 plays, 61 yards, 2:10.**
- CLE – Cody Parkey 43-yard field goal, 5:33. Browns 41–21. **Drive: 8 plays, 50 yards, 3:39.**

**Fourth quarter**

- TEN – Jeremy McNichols 1-yard run (Stephen Gostkowski kick), 1:23. Browns 41–28. **Drive: 15 plays, 91 yards, 4:20.**
- TEN – Cameron Batson 8-yard pass from Ryan Tannehill (Stephen Gostkowski kick), 0:28. Browns 41–35. **Drive: 4 plays, 13 yards, 0:20.**

**Top passers**

- CLE – Baker Mayfield – 25/33, 334 yards, 4 TD
- TEN – Ryan Tannehill – 29/45, 389 yards, 3 TD, INT

**Top rushers**

- CLE – Nick Chubb – 18 rushes, 80 yards, TD
- TEN – Derrick Henry – 15 rushes, 60 yards

**Top receivers**

- CLE – Rashard Higgins – 6 receptions, 95 yards, TD
- TEN – Corey Davis – 11 receptions, 182 yards, TD

The Titans faced Baker Mayfield for the second ever time and the ensuing game became one of the most bitterly fought in the rivalry between the two teams. A failed fourth down run by Derrick Henry and a fumble led to an early 17–0 Browns lead; Mayfield threw four touchdowns in the first half as the Browns led 38–7. The Titans outscored the Browns 28–3 in the second half but failed on an onside kick in the final thirty seconds.

==== Week 14: at Jacksonville Jaguars ====
Week Fourteen: Tennessee Titans at Jacksonville Jaguars – Game summary

Quarter	1	2	3	4	Total
**Titans**	7	10	14	0	**31**
Jaguars	0	3	7	0	**10**

at TIAA Bank Field, Jacksonville, Florida

- Date: December 13
- Game time: 1:00 p.m. EST/12:00 p.m. CST
- Game weather: Partly cloudy, 69 °F (21 °C)
- Game attendance: 15,896
- Referee: Adrian Hill
- TV announcers (CBS): Spero Dedes and Adam Archuleta
- Recap, Game Book

Game information

**First quarter**

- TEN – A. J. Brown 37-yard pass from Ryan Tannehill (Stephen Gostkowski kick), 7:56. Titans 7–0. **Drive: 3 plays, 57 yards, 1:12.**

**Second quarter**

- JAX – Aldrick Rosas 53-yard field goal, 3:27. Titans 7–3. **Drive: 4 plays, 5 yards, 0:55.**
- TEN – Derrick Henry 36-yard run (Stephen Gostkowski kick), 0:44. Titans 14–3. **Drive: 5 plays, 75 yards, 2:43.**
- TEN – Stephen Gostkowski 53-yard field goal, 0:00. Titans 17–3. **Drive: 3 plays, 28 yards, 0:09.**

**Third quarter**

- TEN – Geoff Swaim 5-yard pass from Ryan Tannehill (Stephen Gostkowski kick), 12:24. Titans 24–3. **Drive: 5 plays, 75 yards, 2:36.**
- TEN – Derrick Henry 1-yard run (Stephen Gostkowski kick), 8:48. Titans 31–3. **Drive: 6 plays, 48 yards, 2:43.**
- JAX – Keelan Cole 5-yard pass from Gardner Minshew (Aldrick Rosas kick), 2:59. Titans 31–10. **Drive: 11 plays, 60 yards, 5:49.**

**Fourth quarter**

- No scoring plays.

**Top passers**

- TEN – Ryan Tannehill – 19/24, 212 yards, 2 TD
- JAX – Gardner Minshew – 18/31, 178 yards, TD

**Top rushers**

- TEN – Derrick Henry – 26 rushes, 215 yards, 2 TD
- JAX – James Robinson – 12 rushes, 67 yards

**Top receivers**

- TEN – A. J. Brown – 7 receptions, 112 yards, TD
- JAX – Keelan Cole – 7 receptions, 67 yards, TD

==== Week 15: vs. Detroit Lions ====
Week Fifteen: Detroit Lions at Tennessee Titans – Game summary

Quarter	1	2	3	4	Total
Lions	7	8	3	7	**25**
**Titans**	14	10	0	22	**46**

at Nissan Stadium, Nashville, Tennessee

- Date: December 20
- Game time: 12:00 p.m. CST
- Game weather: Cloudy, 46 °F (8 °C)
- Game attendance: 13,797
- Referee: Jerome Boger
- TV announcers (CBS): Spero Dedes and Adam Archuleta
- Recap, Game Book

Game information

**First quarter**

- TEN – Derrick Henry 3-yard run (Stephen Gostkowski kick), 8:40. Titans 7–0. **Drive: 12 plays, 75 yards, 6:20.**
- DET – Marvin Jones 2-yard pass from Matthew Stafford (Matt Prater kick), 7:06. Tied 7–7. **Drive: 14 plays, 75 yards, 7:06.**
- TEN – Corey Davis 75-yard pass from Ryan Tannehill (Stephen Gostkowski kick), 1:22. Titans 14–7. **Drive: 1 play, 75 yards, 0:12.**

**Second quarter**

- TEN – Ryan Tannehill 17-yard run (Stephen Gostkowski kick), 9:28. Titans 21–7. **Drive: 8 plays, 93 yards, 3:14.**
- DET – Romeo Okwara safety, 3:35. Titans 21–9. **Drive: 2 plays, -3 yards, 0:41.**
- DET – D'Andre Swift 2-yard run (Matt Prater kick), 1:02. Titans 21–15. **Drive: 5 plays, 55 yards, 2:29.**
- TEN – Stephen Gostkowski 38-yard field goal, 0:03. Titans 24–15. **Drive: 8 plays, 52 yards, 1:02.**

**Third quarter**

- DET – Matt Prater 53-yard field goal, 4:14. Titans 24–18. **Drive: 6 plays, 58 yards, 1:49.**

**Fourth quarter**

- TEN – Ryan Tannehill 3-yard run (Derrick Henry run), 14:30. Titans 32–18. **Drive: 9 plays, 83 yards, 4:39.**
- TEN – A. J. Brown 2-yard pass from Ryan Tannehill (Stephen Gostkowski kick), 9:00. Titans 39–18. **Drive: 6 plays, 34 yards, 3:02.**
- DET – D'Andre Swift 6-yard run (Matt Prater kick), 6:23. Titans 39–25. **Drive: 6 plays, 60 yards, 2:37.**
- TEN – Darrynton Evans 3-yard pass from Ryan Tannehill (Stephen Gostkowski kick), 2:07. Titans 46–25. **Drive: 10 plays, 45 yards, 4:16.**

**Top passers**

- DET – Matthew Stafford – 22/32, 252 yards, TD
- TEN – Ryan Tannehill – 21/27, 273 yards, 3 TD

**Top rushers**

- DET – D'Andre Swift – 15 rushes, 67 yards, 2 TD
- TEN – Derrick Henry – 24 rushes, 147 yards, TD

**Top receivers**

- DET – Marvin Jones – 10 receptions, 112, yards, TD
- TEN – Corey Davis – 4 receptions, 110 yards, TD

The Titans cruised to a victory over the Lions to earn their tenth win of the season, ending their streak of four straight 9–7 seasons, and earning their first double-digit win season since 2008.

==== Week 16: at Green Bay Packers ====
Week Sixteen: Tennessee Titans at Green Bay Packers – Game summary

Quarter	1	2	3	4	Total
Titans	0	7	7	0	**14**
**Packers**	6	13	14	7	**40**

at Lambeau Field, Green Bay, Wisconsin

- Date: December 27
- Game time: 7:20 p.m. CST
- Game weather: Snow, 28 °F (−2 °C)
- Game attendance: 0
- Referee: Brad Allen
- TV announcers (NBC): Al Michaels, Cris Collinsworth, Michele Tafoya and Terry McAulay
- Recap, Game Book

Game information

**First quarter**

- GB – Davante Adams 5-yard pass from Aaron Rodgers (Mason Crosby kick missed), 9:55. Packers 6–0. **Drive: 8 plays, 60 yards, 5:05.**

**Second quarter**

- GB – Equanimeous St. Brown 21-yard pass from Aaron Rodgers (Aaron Jones run fails), 14:54. Packers 12–0. **Drive: 10 plays, 75 yards, 5:56.**
- GB – Davante Adams 7-yard pass from Aaron Rodgers (Mason Crosby kick), 10:46. Packers 19–0. **Drive: 6 plays, 34 yards, 2:44.**
- TEN – Jonnu Smith 12-yard pass from Ryan Tannehill (Stephen Gostkowski kick), 0:37. Packers 19–7. **Drive: 10 plays, 71 yards, 3:39.**

**Third quarter**

- TEN – Ryan Tannehill 45-yard run (Stephen Gostkowski kick), 12:01. Packers 19–14. **Drive: 5 plays, 66 yards, 2:59.**
- GB – Davante Adams 8-yard pass from Aaron Rodgers (Mason Crosby kick), 10:27. Packers 26–14. **Drive: 3 plays, 66 yards, 1:34.**
- GB – A. J. Dillon 30-yard run (Mason Crosby kick), 3:35. Packers 33–14. **Drive: 9 plays, 69 yards, 5:48.**

**Fourth quarter**

- GB – A. J. Dillon 7-yard run (Mason Crosby kick), 2:25. Packers 40–14. **Drive: 9 plays, 91 yards, 6:03.**

**Top passers**

- TEN – Ryan Tannehill – 11/24, 121 yards, TD, 2 INT
- GB – Aaron Rodgers – 21/25, 231 yards, 4 TD, INT

**Top rushers**

- TEN – Derrick Henry – 23 rushes, 98 yards
- GB – A. J. Dillon – 21 rushes, 124 yards, 2 TD

**Top receivers**

- TEN – A. J. Brown – 4 receptions, 43 yards
- GB – Davante Adams – 11 receptions, 142 yards, 3 TD

In a snowstorm, Packers head coach Matt LaFleur defeated the Titans in his first meeting with them since leaving the organization in 2019 to become the new head coach of the Packers. LaFleur had served as offensive coordinator for the Titans during the 2018 season. Though the Titans rushed for 156 yards, Ryan Tannehill completed just eleven passes for 124 yards.

==== Week 17: at Houston Texans ====
Week Seventeen: Tennessee Titans at Houston Texans – Game summary

Quarter	1	2	3	4	Total
**Titans**	3	14	14	10	**41**
Texans	3	6	19	10	**38**

at NRG Stadium, Houston, Texas

- Date: January 3, 2021
- Game time: 3:25 p.m. CST
- Game weather: Sunny, 66 °F (19 °C) (retractable roof open)
- Game attendance: 12,504
- Referee: Shawn Hochuli
- TV announcers (CBS): Greg Gumbel, Rich Gannon and Amanda Balionis
- Recap, Game Book

Game information

**First quarter**

- TEN – Sam Sloman 47-yard field goal, 6:41. Titans 3–0. **Drive: 4 plays, 2 yards, 0:55.**
- HOU – Kaʻimi Fairbairn 24-yard field goal, 1:42. Tied 3–3. **Drive: 11 plays, 72 yards, 4:59.**

**Second quarter**

- TEN – Derrick Henry 52-yard run (Sam Sloman kick), 14:51. Titans 10–3. **Drive: 4 plays, 75 yards, 1:51.**
- HOU – Kaʻimi Fairbairn 43-yard field goal, 8:15. Titans 10–6. **Drive: 11 plays, 51 yards, 6:36.**
- TEN – A. J. Brown 4-yard pass from Ryan Tannehill (Sam Sloman kick), 4:29. Titans 17–6. **Drive: 7 plays, 75 yards, 3:46.**
- HOU – Kaʻimi Fairbairn 28-yard field goal, 0:10. Titans 17–9. **Drive: 12 plays, 50 yards, 4:19.**

**Third quarter**

- TEN – Derrick Henry 6-yard run (Sam Sloman kick), 9:53. Titans 24–9. **Drive: 10 plays, 75 yards, 5:07.**
- HOU – Brandin Cooks 38-yard pass from Deshaun Watson (kick failed), 8:08. Titans 24–15. **Drive: 4 plays, 75 yards, 1:45.**
- TEN – Ryan Tannehill 5-yard run (Sam Sloman kick), 4:29. Titans 31–15. **Drive: 8 plays, 77 yards, 3:39.**
- HOU – Brandin Cooks 20-yard pass from Deshaun Watson (pass failed), 2:59. Titans 31–21. **Drive: 3 plays, 65 yards, 1:30.**
- HOU – David Johnson 1-yard run (Kaʻimi Fairbairn kick), 1:20. Titans 31–28. **Drive: 3 plays, 28 yards, 1:32.**

**Fourth quarter**

- HOU – Pharaoh Brown 7-yard pass from Deshaun Watson (Kaʻimi Fairbairn kick), 10:14. Texans 35–31. **Drive: 6 plays, 52 yards, 2:59.**
- TEN – Ryan Tannehill 5-yard run (Sam Sloman kick), 1:42. Titans 38–35. **Drive: 19 plays, 75 yards, 8:32.**
- HOU – Kaʻimi Fairbairn 51-yard field goal, 0:18. Tied 38–38. **Drive: 8 plays, 58 yards, 1:24.**
- TEN – Sam Sloman 37-yard field goal, 0:00. Titans 41–38. **Drive: 3 plays, 56 yards, 0:18.**

**Top passers**

- TEN – Ryan Tannehill – 18/27, 216 yards, TD
- HOU – Deshaun Watson – 28/39, 365 yards, 3 TD

**Top rushers**

- TEN – Derrick Henry – 34 rushes, 250 yards, 2 TD
- HOU – David Johnson – 14 rushes, 84 yards, TD

**Top receivers**

- TEN – A. J. Brown – 10 receptions, 151 yards, TD
- HOU – Brandin Cooks – 11 receptions, 166 yards, 2 TD

After combining for 78 points in their first meeting Houston and Tennessee topped that with 79 points in the regular season finale. Derrick Henry reached 2,000 yards and set the team record for rushing yards in a season and had two scores, but the Texans rallied from down 24–9 to take a 35–31 lead in the fourth quarter. Ryan Tannehill led a 19-play drive encompassing 8:32 and Tannehill ran in a five-yard score (after a quarterback sneak score was erased on a penalty). Deshaun Watson led the Texans to the Tennessee 38 but had to settle for a field goal. With only eighteen seconds to work with Tannehill completed a 52-yard strike to A. J. Brown; a four-yard run to the Houston 19 set up the winning field goal by newly signed kicker Samuel Sloman; the kick bounced off the upright and bounced in.

With the win, the Titans swept the Texans for the first time since 2007, and secured a playoff berth as the AFC South division winner for the first time since 2008. In the playoffs, they would host a home game in the Wild Card round against the Baltimore Ravens, whom they beat earlier in the season.

=== Standings ===
==== Division ====
AFC South
	W	L	T	PCT	DIV	CONF	PF	PA	STK
^{(4)} Tennessee Titans	11	5	0	.688	5–1	8–4	491	439	W1
^{(7)} Indianapolis Colts	11	5	0	.688	4–2	7–5	451	362	W1
Houston Texans	4	12	0	.250	2–4	3–9	384	464	L5
Jacksonville Jaguars	1	15	0	.063	1–5	1–11	306	492	L15

==== Conference ====
AFC
#	Team	Division	W	L	T	PCT	DIV	CONF	SOS	SOV	STK
**Division leaders**
1	Kansas City Chiefs	West	14	2	0	.875	4–2	10–2	.465	.464	L1
2	Buffalo Bills	East	13	3	0	.813	6–0	10–2	.512	.471	W6
3	Pittsburgh Steelers	North	12	4	0	.750	4–2	9–3	.475	.448	L1
4 (Note: Tennessee finished ahead of Indianapolis in the AFC South based on division record.)	Tennessee Titans	South	11	5	0	.688	5–1	8–4	.475	.398	W1
**Wild cards**
5 (Note: Baltimore claimed the No. 5 seed over Indianapolis based on head-to-head victory. Division tiebreaker used to eliminate Cleveland (see below).) (Note: Baltimore claimed the No. 5 seed over Cleveland based on head-to-head sweep.)	Baltimore Ravens	North	11	5	0	.688	4–2	7–5	.494	.401	W5
6 (Note: Cleveland claimed the No. 6 seed over Indianapolis based on head-to-head victory.)	Cleveland Browns	North	11	5	0	.688	3–3	7–5	.451	.406	W1
7	Indianapolis Colts	South	11	5	0	.688	4–2	7–5	.443	.384	W1
**Did not qualify for the postseason**
8	Miami Dolphins	East	10	6	0	.625	3–3	7–5	.467	.347	L1
9	Las Vegas Raiders	West	8	8	0	.500	4–2	6–6	.539	.477	W1
10 (Note: New England finished ahead of the LA Chargers based on head-to-head victory.)	New England Patriots	East	7	9	0	.438	3–3	6–6	.527	.429	W1
11	Los Angeles Chargers	West	7	9	0	.438	3–3	6–6	.482	.344	W4
12	Denver Broncos	West	5	11	0	.313	1–5	4–8	.566	.388	L3
13	Cincinnati Bengals	North	4	11	1	.281	1–5	4–8	.529	.438	L1
14	Houston Texans	South	4	12	0	.250	2–4	3–9	.541	.219	L5
15	New York Jets	East	2	14	0	.125	0–6	1–11	.594	.656	L1
16	Jacksonville Jaguars	South	1	15	0	.063	1–5	1–11	.549	.688	L15
**Tiebreakers** (Note: When breaking ties for three or more teams under the NFL's rules, they are first broken within divisions, then comparing only the highest ranked remaining team from each division.)

== Postseason ==
=== Schedule ===
Round	Date	Opponent (seed)	Result	Record	Venue	Recap
Wild Card	January 10, 2021	Baltimore Ravens (5)	L 13–20	0–1	Nissan Stadium	Recap

=== Game summaries ===
==== AFC Wild Card Playoffs: vs. (5) Baltimore Ravens ====
AFC Wild Card Playoffs: (5) Baltimore Ravens at (4) Tennessee Titans – Game summary

Quarter	1	2	3	4	Total
Ravens	0	10	7	3	20
Titans	10	0	0	3	13

at Nissan Stadium, Nashville, Tennessee

- Date: January 10, 2021
- Game time: 12:05 p.m. CST
- Game weather: Cloudy, 33 °F (1 °C)
- Game attendance: 14,029
- Referee: Jerome Boger
- TV announcers (ESPN/ABC): Steve Levy, Brian Griese, Louis Riddick and Lisa Salters
- Recap, Game Book

Game information

First quarter

- TEN – A. J. Brown 10-yard pass from Ryan Tannehill (Stephen Gostkowski kick), 5:39. Titans 7–0. Drive: 10 plays, 70 yards, 6:11.
- TEN – Stephen Gostkowski 45-yard field goal, 1:38. Titans 10–0. Drive: 7 plays, 45 yards, 2:42.

Second quarter

- BAL – Justin Tucker 33-yard field goal, 9:59. Titans 10–3. Drive: 12 plays, 60 yards, 6:39.
- BAL – Lamar Jackson 48-yard run (Justin Tucker kick), 2:32. Tied 10–10. Drive: 7 plays, 82 yards, 4:03.

Third quarter

- BAL – J. K. Dobbins 4-yard run (Justin Tucker kick), 9:01. Ravens 17–10. Drive: 10 plays, 77 yards, 5:59.

Fourth quarter

- TEN – Stephen Gostkowski 25-yard field goal, 14:56. Ravens 17–13. Drive: 7 plays, 51 yards, 3:15.
- BAL – Justin Tucker 51-yard field goal, 4:19. Ravens 20–13. Drive: 9 plays, 52 yards, 5:41.

Top passers

- BAL – Lamar Jackson – 17/24, 179 yards, INT
- TEN – Ryan Tannehill – 18/26, 165 yards, TD, INT

Top rushers

- BAL – Lamar Jackson – 16 rushes, 136 yards, TD
- TEN – Derrick Henry – 18 rushes, 40 yards

Top receivers

- BAL – Marquise Brown – 7 reception, 109 yards
- TEN – A. J. Brown – 6 reception, 83 yards, TD

The Titans faced the Ravens in a rematch of their Week 11 regular season game (which the Titans won). Although they took an early 10–0 lead, the Ravens rallied to score 17 unanswered points. Derrick Henry, who led the NFL in rushing yards, was held to just 40 yards rushing on 18 carries. With the Titans trailing 20–13 late, Tannehill's pass intended for Kalif Raymond was intercepted by Marcus Peters; in a reversal of the regular season game, the Ravens players celebrated by dancing on the Titans' logo at midfield.
