= A. J. Brown =

American football player (born 1997)

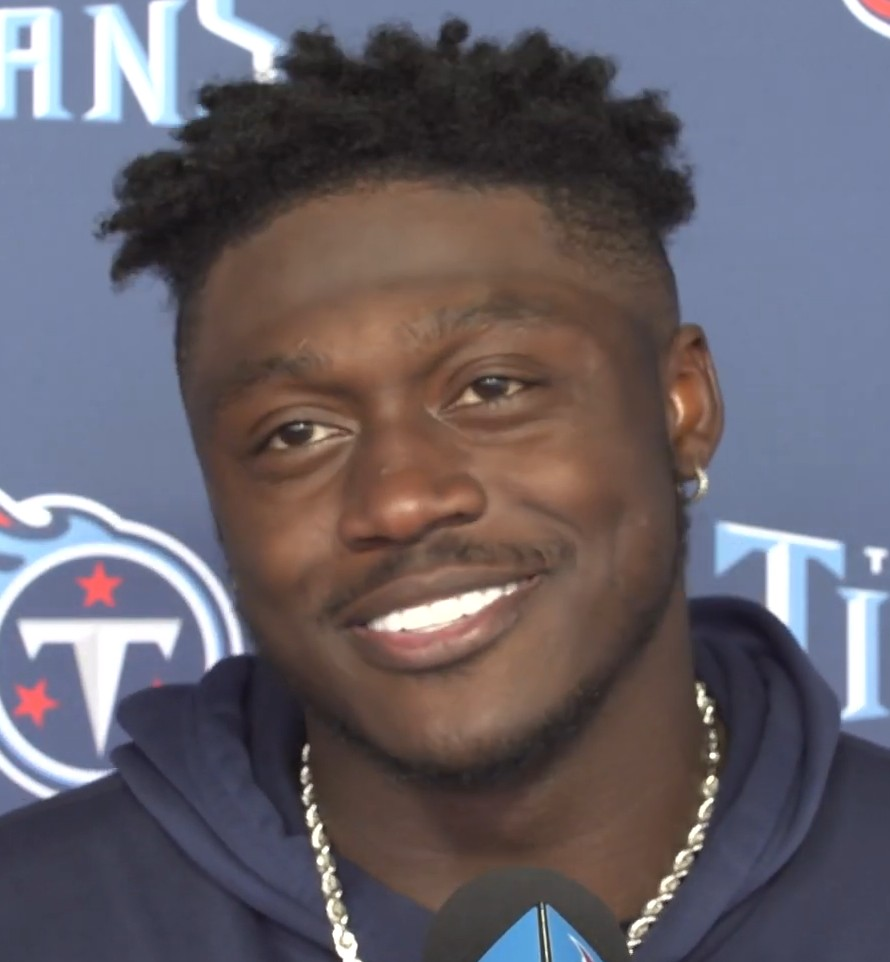
- Brown with the Tennessee Titans in 2021

No. 1 – New England Patriots
- Position: Wide receiver
- Roster status: Active

Personal information
- Born: June 30, 1997 (age 29); Starkville, Mississippi, U.S.
- Listed height: 6 ft 1 in (1.85 m)
- Listed weight: 226 lb (103 kg)

Career information
- High school: Starkville
- College: Ole Miss (2016–2018)
- NFL draft: 2019: 2nd round, 51st overall pick

Career history
- Tennessee Titans (2019–2021); Philadelphia Eagles (2022–2025); New England Patriots (2026–present)

Awards and highlights
- Super Bowl champion (LIX); 3× Second-team All-Pro (2022–2024); 3× Pro Bowl (2020, 2022, 2023); PFWA All-Rookie Team (2019); Conerly Trophy (2017); 2× First-team All-SEC (2017, 2018)

Career NFL statistics as of Week 10, 2026
- Receptions: 535
- Receiving yards: 8,157
- Receiving touchdowns: 56
- Stats at Pro Football Reference

Arthur Juan Brown (born June 30, 1997) is an American professional football wide receiver for the New England Patriots of the National Football League (NFL). He played college football for the Ole Miss Rebels, twice earning first-team All-SEC honors. Brown was selected by the Tennessee Titans in the second round of the 2019 NFL draft. During his three seasons with the Titans, he was named to the Pro Bowl in 2020. He was traded to the Philadelphia Eagles in 2022, where he extended his Pro Bowl selections to three, was named to three second-team All-Pros, and was a member of the team that won Super Bowl LIX. Brown was traded to the Patriots in 2026.

== Early life ==
Brown was born Arthur Juan Brown on June 30, 1997. His mother claims the middle name on his birth certificate of "Juan" was spelled incorrectly, and that his middle name is actually Jauan.

Brown attended Starkville High School in Starkville, Mississippi, where he played football and baseball. As a senior, Brown recorded 83 receptions for 1,371 yards and 13 touchdowns and led his team to a 6A state championship. He was named first-team All-State by USA Today, The Clarion-Ledger's Dandy Dozen, and the Mississippi Association of Coaches.

As a top recruit in both football and baseball, Brown became the second player, after Kyler Murray, to play in both the Under Armour All-America Football Game and the Under Armour All-America Baseball Game. In the 2016 Under Armour All-America Game, he had four receptions for 79 yards and a touchdown.

Brown was a consensus four-star prospect by the major recruiting services. He was ranked the No. 45 overall recruit by Scout, No. 47 by 247Sports, No. 53 by Rivals and No. 66 by ESPN. Brown was also listed as the No. 5 wide receiver prospect in the country by 247Sports and Scout and was ranked the second-best player in the state by 247Sports and third-best by Scout. On February 3, 2016, he committed to play both college baseball and college football at the University of Mississippi.

== College career ==
The San Diego Padres selected Brown as an outfielder in the 19th round of the 2016 Major League Baseball draft. He signed with the Padres, which prevented him from playing college baseball at Ole Miss, but he was still eligible to play football. Brown participated in extended spring training with the Padres after his freshman and sophomore years at Ole Miss. At Ole Miss, he majored in General Studies with an emphasis in Education, Journalism, and Legal Studies.

=== 2016 season ===
In Brown's first game of his collegiate career, he started and recorded two receptions for 48 yards against Wofford. As a true freshman at Ole Miss in 2016, Brown played in all 12 games and finished fifth on the team with 29 receptions for 412 yards and two touchdowns. He finished fourth among SEC freshmen with 2.4 catches per game and fifth with 34.3 receiving yards per game.

=== 2017 season ===
During the first game of his sophomore season in 2017, Brown hauled in eight catches, two of which were touchdowns of 71 and 77 yards. He tied the school record with 14 receptions against Louisiana along with 185 yards and two touchdowns while setting the school record for receiving yards in a game with 233 against South Alabama (later broken by Elijah Moore).

Brown finished the season with 75 receptions for a school record 1,252 yards and a school-record-tying 11 touchdowns (shared with Laquon Treadwell) in 12 games, leading the team and the SEC. He was awarded the Conerly Trophy, given to the best college football player in the state of Mississippi.

=== 2018 season ===
Brown's 2018 junior season was shared with future NFL Pro Bowler DK Metcalf and was highlighted by nine receptions for 212 yards (at the time, second in school history only to his own record the previous year) and a touchdown against Vanderbilt. Brown again led the team and the SEC in receiving, finishing with a school-record 85 receptions (later passed by Moore) and 1,320 yards (still the record) and six touchdowns. He again had six 100-yard receiving games, tying his own record (shared with Treadwell and later Moore). He was named first-team All-SEC for the second consecutive year.

Following the 2018 season, Brown announced he would forgo his senior year and enter the 2019 NFL draft. As of 2022, Brown was the Ole Miss' all-time leader in receiving yards and 100-yard games (12).

== Professional career ==
Pre-draft measurables
Height	Weight	Arm length	Hand span	Wingspan	40-yard dash	10-yard split	20-yard split	20-yard shuttle	Three-cone drill	Vertical jump	Broad jump	Bench press	Wonderlic
6 ft 0 1/2 in (1.84 m)	226 lb (103 kg)	32 7/8 in (0.84 m)	9 3/4 in (0.25 m)	6 ft 6 in (1.98 m)	4.49 s	1.56 s	2.65 s	4.25 s	7.00 s	36.5 in (0.93 m)	10 ft 0 in (3.05 m)	19 reps	18
All values from NFL Combine/Pro Day

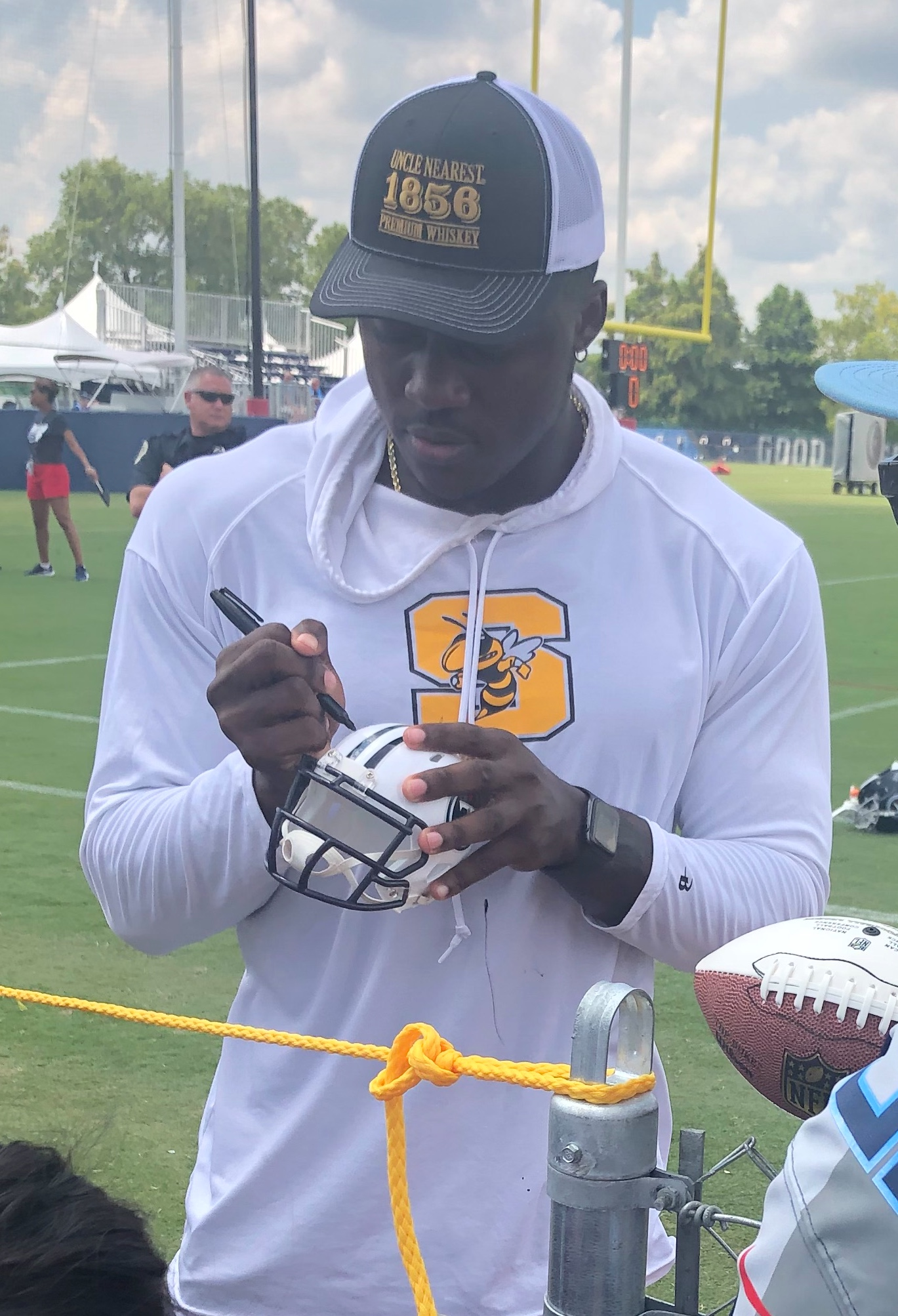
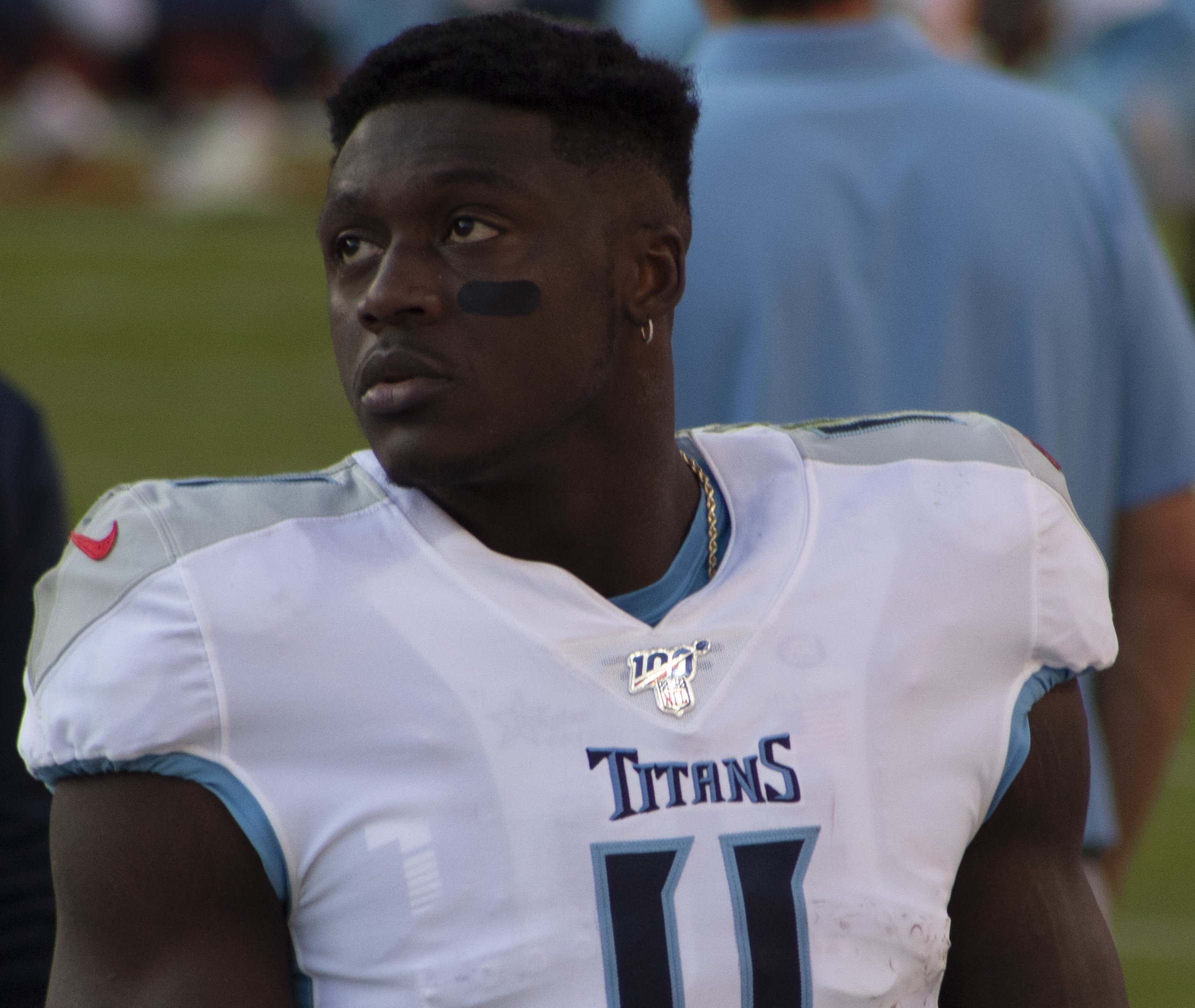
Brown in 2019

=== Tennessee Titans ===
==== 2019 season ====
Brown was selected by the Tennessee Titans in the second round (51st overall) of the 2019 NFL draft. He was the fourth of 29 receivers taken in the draft, 13 picks ahead of teammate DK Metcalf. On June 12, 2019, Brown signed a four-year deal worth $5,641,199 with a signing bonus of $2,122,690 and a 2019 cap hit of $1,025,670.

Brown made his NFL debut in the Titans' season-opening 43–13 road victory over the Cleveland Browns. In the game, he caught three passes for 100 yards. During Week 4 against the Atlanta Falcons, he caught his first two NFL touchdowns from Marcus Mariota in the 24–10 road victory. Brown finished the game with three receptions for 94 yards and the two aforementioned touchdowns. During a Week 8 27–23 victory over the Tampa Bay Buccaneers, he caught an eight-yard touchdown.

During a Week 12 42–20 victory over the Jacksonville Jaguars, Brown had four receptions for 135 yards and a touchdown as the Titans won. In the next game against the Indianapolis Colts, he recorded three receptions for 45 yards in the 31–17 road victory. The following week against the Oakland Raiders, Brown caught five passes for 153 yards and two touchdowns, including a 91-yard touchdown, during the 42–21 road victory. During a Week 15 24–21 loss to the Houston Texans, he had eight receptions for 114 yards and a touchdown. In the next game against the New Orleans Saints, Brown rushed for a 49-yard touchdown and caught a 34-yard reception during the 38–28 loss. In the regular-season finale against the Texans, Brown recorded four receptions for 124 yards and a touchdown during the 35–14 road victory to help the Titans clinch a playoff berth.

Brown finished his rookie year with 52 receptions for 1,051 receiving yards (leading all NFL rookies) and eight receiving touchdowns, causing some to regard him as "the steal of the 2019 draft". He was named to the PFWA All-Rookie Team. In three postseason games, Brown totaled five receptions for 64 yards as the Titans' season ended with a 35–24 road loss in the AFC Championship to the Kansas City Chiefs.

==== 2020 season ====
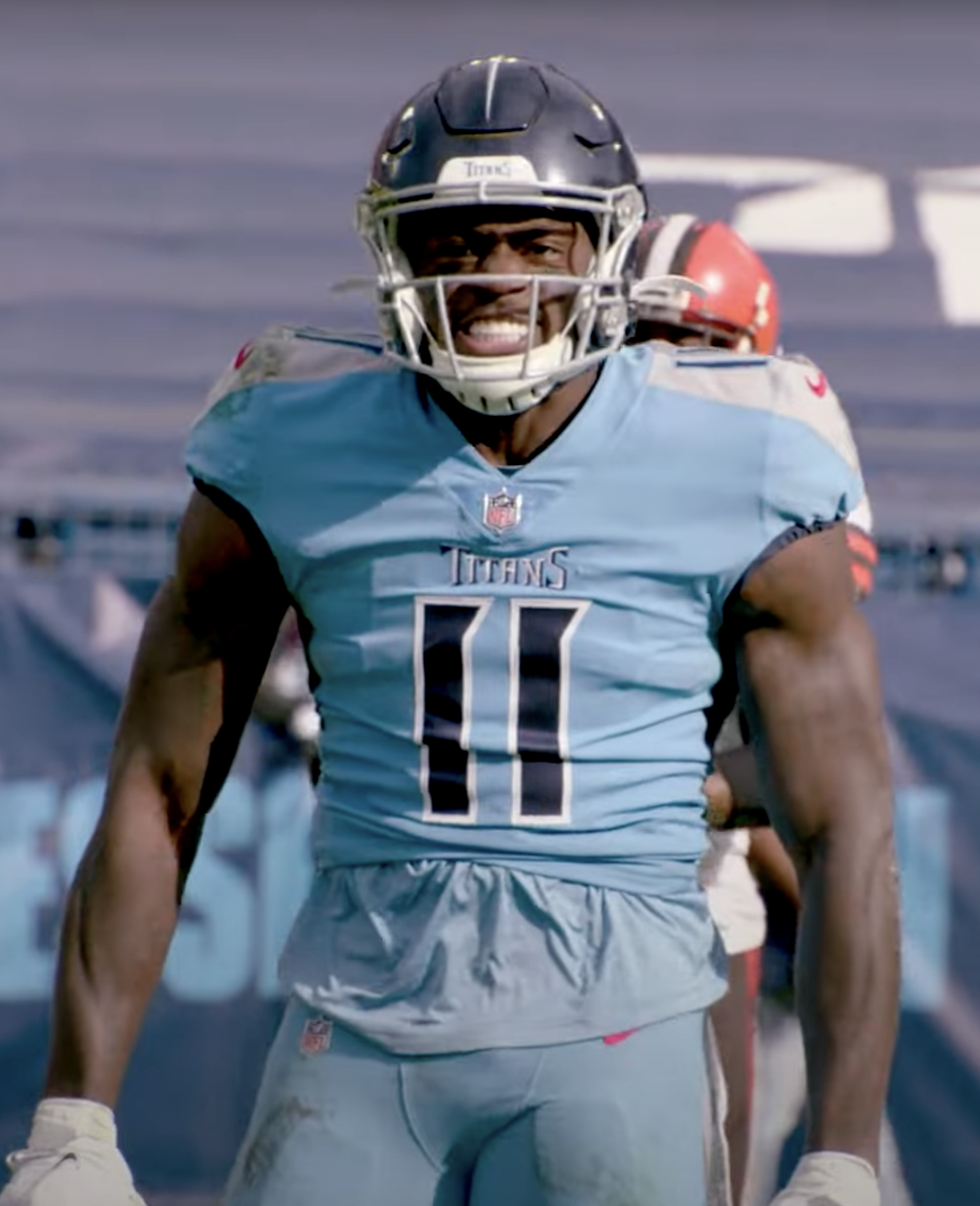
Brown playing against the Cleveland Browns in 2020

During a Tuesday night game in Week 5 against the Buffalo Bills, Brown recorded seven receptions for 82 yards and his first touchdown of the season during the 42–16 victory. In the next game against the Texans, Brown had five receptions for 58 yards and two touchdowns in the 42–36 overtime victory. The following week against the Pittsburgh Steelers, he caught six passes for 153 yards and a 74-yard touchdown as the Titans lost 24–27. During a Week 9 24–17 victory over the Chicago Bears, Brown had four receptions for 101 yards and a 40-yard touchdown. Three weeks later against the Colts, Brown recorded four catches for 98 yards, including a 69-yard touchdown reception, and returned an onside kick for a touchdown during the 45–26 road victory. During a Week 14 31–10 road victory over the Jaguars, Brown caught seven passes for 112 yards and a touchdown. In the regular-season finale against the Texans, Brown had 10 receptions for 151 yards and a touchdown during the 41–38 road victory.

Brown finished his second professional season with 70 receptions for 1,075 yards and 11 touchdowns, and was voted to his first Pro Bowl appearance. In the Wild Card Round against the Baltimore Ravens, Brown recorded six receptions for 83 yards and a touchdown as the Titans lost 20–13. Brown had suffered injuries to both of his knees early in the season, causing him to miss two games. He underwent successful surgery to both of his knees January 19, 2021. He was ranked 62nd by his fellow players on the NFL Top 100 Players of 2021.

==== 2021 season ====
Brown entered the 2021 season as a starting wide receiver alongside Julio Jones. During a Week 8 34–31 road victory over the Colts, he recorded 10 receptions for 155 yards and a touchdown. Brown suffered a chest injury in Week 11 and was placed on injured reserve on November 27, 2021. He was activated on December 23. In his first game back from injury, Brown had 11 receptions for 145 yards and a touchdown during a 20–17 victory over the San Francisco 49ers.

Brown finished the 2021 season with 63 receptions for 869 yards and five touchdowns in 13 games. During the Divisional Round against the Cincinnati Bengals, Brown had five receptions for 142 yards and a touchdown in the 19–16 loss.

=== Philadelphia Eagles ===
==== 2022 season ====
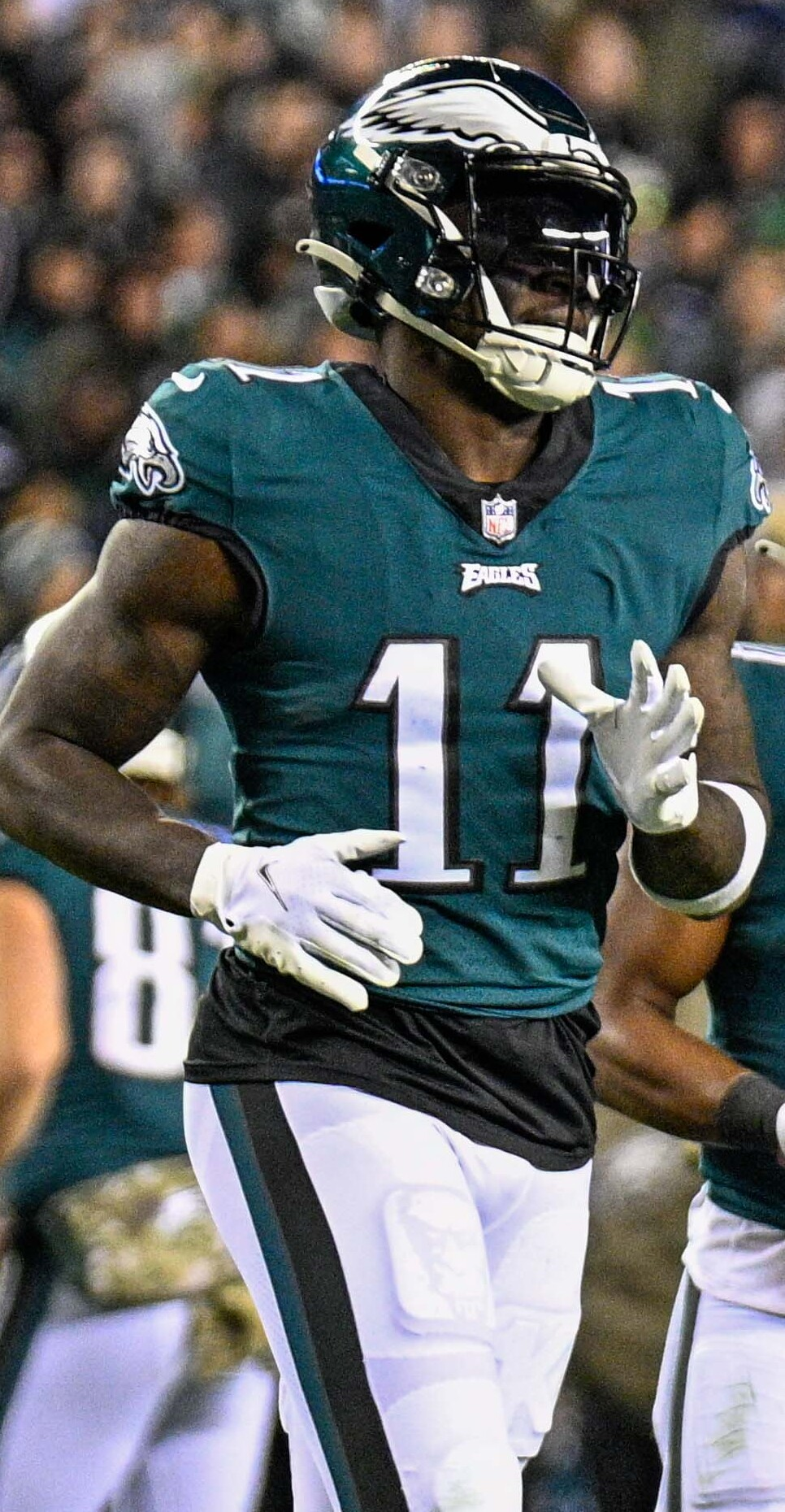
Brown in 2022

On April 28, 2022, during the 2022 NFL draft, Brown was traded to the Philadelphia Eagles for the 18th overall pick in the 2022 draft, which the Titans used to select wide receiver Treylon Burks from Arkansas, a player widely compared to Brown, while Tennessee also received a third-round pick. Brown signed a four-year, $100 million contract with the Eagles after the trade, with $57 million guaranteed. The trade was opposed by Titans head coach Mike Vrabel and was highly criticized. Brown's absence contributed to a decrease of 60 receptions and 860 yards among Titans wide receivers through 13 weeks and was one reason for the Titans' decision to fire general manager Jon Robinson at that point in the season.

Brown set the franchise record for most receiving yards in a player’s debut in the season-opening 38–35 road victory over the Detroit Lions, finishing with 10 receptions for 155 yards. During a Week 8 35–13 victory over the Steelers, Brown recorded six receptions for 156 yards and a career-high three touchdowns. During a Week 13 35–10 victory over his former team, the Titans, Brown had eight receptions for 119 yards and two touchdowns. Two weeks later against the Bears, he caught nine passes for 181 yards in the 25–20 road victory.

Brown finished the 2022 season with 88 receptions for 1,496 yards and 11 touchdowns. He set a single-season franchise record for receiving yards. He was ranked 22nd by his fellow players on the NFL Top 100 Players of 2023. During Super Bowl LVII against the Chiefs, Brown had six receptions for 96 yards and a touchdown in the 38–35 loss.

==== 2023 season ====
On October 29, 2023, Brown recorded his sixth consecutive game with at least 125 receiving yards, which broke the standing NFL record of five straight games. The standing record was held by Calvin Johnson (2012) and Pat Studstill (1966). Brown's historic streak occurred between Week 3 and Week 8; he amassed 831 receiving yards over this span. This included a Week 3 performance against the Washington Commanders in which Brown finished with 175 yards and two touchdowns in a 34-31 overtime victory. Brown was additionally named NFC Offensive Player of the Month of October for his record-breaking performance. In the 2023 season, Brown finished with 106 receptions for 1,456 yards and seven touchdowns. He was ranked 21st by his fellow players on the NFL Top 100 Players of 2024.

Due to a sprained knee sustained in the season finale against the Giants, Brown missed the playoffs.

==== 2024 season ====
On April 25, 2024, Brown signed a three-year, $96 million contract extension, keeping him with the Eagles through the 2029 season.

Brown started the season with five receptions for 119 yards and a touchdown in a 34–29 victory over the Packers. Brown missed the next three games with a hamstring injury. During Week 6, he returned and had six receptions for 116 yards and a touchdown against the Browns in a 20–16 victory. In the 2024 season, Brown finished with 67 receptions for 1,079 yards and seven touchdowns. In Super Bowl LIX against the Chiefs, Brown recorded three catches for 43 yards, including a 12-yard touchdown reception, in the Eagles’ 40–22 victory, earning him his first Super Bowl championship. He was ranked 29th by his fellow players on the NFL Top 100 Players of 2025.

==== 2025 season ====
Following a lackluster start to the 2025 season, in which he failed to reach 100 combined yards in the first two weeks, Brown broke out during Week 3 in a 33–26 win to the Los Angeles Rams, where he caught six passes for 109 yards and a touchdown. Over the next three games, Brown had averaged 43 yards, before logging 121 yards and two touchdowns in a 28–22 win over the Minnesota Vikings. During the game, Brown aggravated his hamstring and was ruled out for Week 8 against the Giants. It was later announced that Brown would be out until after the Eagles' bye week.

In Week 10 against the Packers, Brown made his return from his hamstring injury, totaling only two receptions for 13 yards. He would go onto a livestream and express his frustration with his usage after a 10–7 victory. Eagles owner Jeffrey Lurie would talk to Brown about his frustration in which was reported to be very positive. After being held to 49 yards on Sunday Night Football against the Lions, Brown had 110 yards and a touchdown in the 24–21 loss to the Cowboys. In Weeks 13 and 14 against the Chicago Bears and Los Angeles Chargers, Brown had ten receptions for 132 yards and six receptions for 100 yards, respectively, while catching two touchdowns.

In Week 17's 13–12 win over the Buffalo Bills, Brown became the first receiver in franchise history with four consecutive years of 1,000 yards receiving after catching five passes for 68 yards. Overall, he finished the 2025 season with 78 receptions for 1,003 yards.

Over the course of the 2025 season, Brown publicly voiced frustrations with the Eagles' offense and rumors had begun to surface that the Eagles would look to trade Brown after the season.

=== New England Patriots ===
On June 1, 2026, Brown was traded to the New England Patriots in exchange for a 2027 fifth-round pick and a 2028 first-round pick. The move reunited him with Patriots head coach Mike Vrabel, who was Brown's former head coach on the Titans. By waiting until after 4 p.m. that day, the Eagles split the salary cap hit they incurred in the trade between the 2026 and 2027 league years.

On September 11, 2026, Brown was placed on injured reserve due to a high ankle sprain sustained in the team's season opener against the Seattle Seahawks. He was activated on October 17.

== Career statistics ==
Legend
	Won the Super Bowl
	Led the league
**Bold**	Career high

=== NFL ===
==== Regular season ====
Year	Team	Games		Receiving					Rushing					Fumbles	
Year	Team	GP	GS	Rec	Yds	Avg	Lng	TD	Att	Yds	Avg	Lng	TD	Fum	Lost
2019	TEN	16	11	52	1,051	**20.2**	**91**	8	**3**	**60**	**20.0**	**49**	**1**	1	0
2020	TEN	14	12	70	1,075	15.4	73	**11**	0	0	0.0	0	0	**2**	1
2021	TEN	13	13	63	869	13.8	57	5	2	10	5.0	7	0	0	0
2022	PHI	17	16	88	**1,496**	17.0	78	**11**	0	0	0.0	0	0	**2**	**2**
2023	PHI	17	17	**106**	1,456	13.7	59	7	0	0	0.0	0	0	**2**	**2**
2024	PHI	13	13	67	1,079	16.1	67	7	0	0	0.0	0	0	0	0
2025	PHI	15	15	78	1,003	12.9	45	7	0	0	0.0	0	0	0	0
2026	NE	4	4	11	128	11.6	21	0	0	0	0.0	0	0	1	0
Career		109	101	535	8,157	15.2	91	56	5	70	14.0	49	1	8	5

==== Postseason ====
Year	Team	Games		Receiving					Rushing					Fumbles	
Year	Team	GP	GS	Rec	Yds	Avg	Lng	TD	Att	Yds	Avg	Lng	TD	Fum	Lost
2019	TEN	3	3	5	64	12.8	37	0	**1**	**9**	**9.0**	**9**	0	0	0
2020	TEN	1	1	6	83	13.8	28	1	0	0	0.0	0	0	0	0
2021	TEN	1	1	5	142	**28.4**	41	1	0	0	0.0	0	0	0	0
2022	PHI	3	3	**13**	146	11.2	**45**	1	0	0	0.0	0	0	0	0
2023	PHI	0	0	Did not play due to injury											
2024	PHI	4	4	12	**163**	13.6	31	**2**	0	0	0.0	0	0	0	0
2025	PHI	1	1	3	25	8.3	10	0	0	0	0.0	0	0	0	0
Career		13	13	44	623	14.2	45	5	1	9	9.0	9	0	0	0

=== College ===
Season	Team	GP	Receiving						
Season	Team	GP	Rec	Yds	Avg	Lng	TD	R/G	Y/G
2016	Ole Miss	12	29	412	14.2	37	2	2.4	34.3
2017	Ole Miss	12	75	1,252	**16.7**	77	**11**	6.3	104.3
2018	Ole Miss	12	**85**	**1,320**	15.5	**84**	6	**7.1**	**110.0**
Career		36	189	2,984	15.8	84	19	5.3	82.9

== Personal life ==
Brown is a Christian. He has said, “I’m a Christian first, before anything. When I step out on the field, I want to say thank you for the blessing, for everything, because I don’t have to do this. I get to do this. So I always wear a cross.”

On May 16, 2026, Brown married former college softball player Kelsey Riley. Their son was born in 2022. He has a daughter from a previous relationship.

Brown developed a close friendship with former teammate quarterback Jalen Hurts. Brown made Hurts the godfather of his daughter. Following the 2025 NFL season, Brown revealed that the two were no longer as close, but emphasized that there was no animosity between them.

In 2021, Brown posted a video to social media detailing his struggles with depression and suicidal ideation during the 2020 NFL season and encouraging those with similar struggles to seek help. Brown stated that reaching out to fellow NFL player and college teammate Elijah Moore and receiving help allowed him to overcome his struggles.

In 2022, Brown provided vocals on the Christmas album A Philly Special Christmas by The Philly Specials.

In 2026, Jaylen Brown revealed that the two were second cousins during an interview.
