= Teair Tart =

American football player (born 1997)

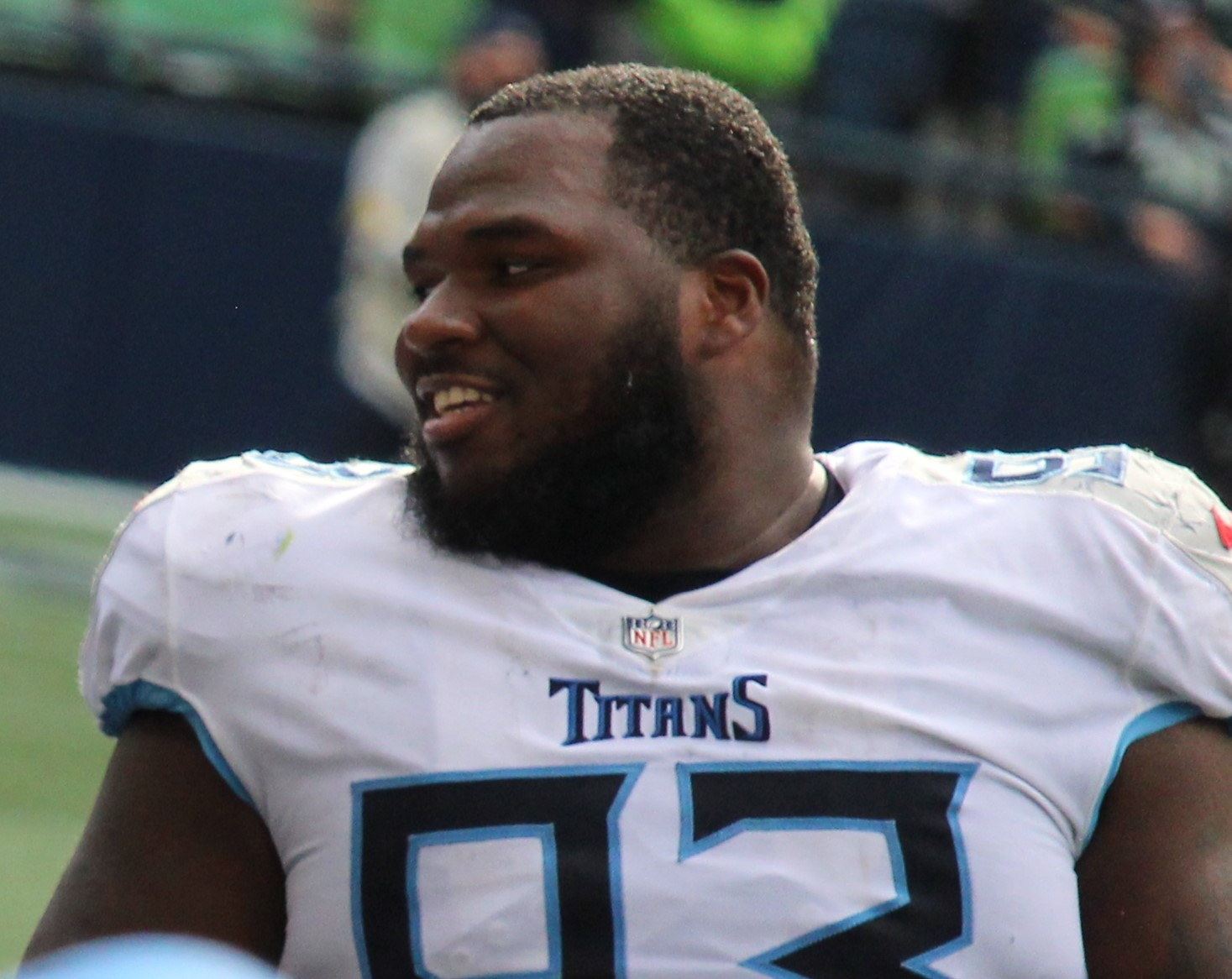
- Tart with the Tennessee Titans in 2021

No. 93 – Los Angeles Chargers
- Position: Defensive tackle
- Roster status: Active

Personal information
- Born: February 28, 1997 (age 29); Philadelphia, Pennsylvania, U.S.
- Listed height: 6 ft 2 in (1.88 m)
- Listed weight: 315 lb (143 kg)

Career information
- High school: West Philadelphia
- College: ASA (2016); Ellsworth CC (2017); FIU (2018–2019)
- NFL draft: 2020: undrafted

Career history
- Tennessee Titans (2020–2023); Houston Texans (2023); Miami Dolphins (2024)*; Los Angeles Chargers (2024–present)
- * Offseason or practice squad member only

Career NFL statistics as of Week 5, 2026
- Total tackles: 150
- Sacks: 3.5
- Forced fumbles: 2
- Fumble recoveries: 3
- Pass deflections: 13
- Interceptions: 2
- Stats at Pro Football Reference

Teair Tart (born February 28, 1997) is an American professional football defensive tackle for the Los Angeles Chargers of the National Football League (NFL). He played college football at ASA College, Ellsworth Community College, and Florida International University. He signed as an undrafted free agent with the Tennessee Titans in 2020.

== College career ==
Tart began his collegiate career at ASA College in New York City, where he recorded five sacks in six games before leaving the team after his older brother was killed in a motorcycle accident. Tart briefly enrolled at Valley Forge Military Academy, but transferred to East Mississippi Community College midway through his first semester there. He received an offer from Alabama, which was withdrawn after he was cut from East Mississippi's football team shortly before the beginning of the season. Tart then enrolled at Ellsworth Community College in Iowa and played in two games before a knee injury ended his season. Tart committed to transfer to FIU for the final two seasons of his NCAA eligibility.

In his first season with the FIU Panthers, Tart had 19 tackles, seven tackles for loss, and four sacks with a forced fumble and pass broken up. He recorded 32 tackles, with 12 tackles for loss, with two sacks and a forced fumble.

== Professional career ==
Pre-draft measurables
| Height | Weight | Arm length | Hand span | Wingspan |
|---|---|---|---|---|
| 6 ft 2 7/8 in (1.90 m) | 304 lb (138 kg) | 33 3/4 in (0.86 m) | 9 1/2 in (0.24 m) | 6 ft 10 1/4 in (2.09 m) |
All values from Pro Day

=== Tennessee Titans ===
Tart was signed by the Tennessee Titans as an undrafted free agent on April 25, 2020. Tart was waived on September 5, 2020, during final roster cuts and was signed to the team's practice squad the following day. Tart was signed to the Titans' active roster on November 7, 2020. On December 7, 2020, he was suspended one game for violations of unnecessary roughness and unsportsmanlike conduct rules after stepping on Cleveland Browns player Wyatt Teller in Week 13. He was reinstated from suspension on December 15, 2020. He was placed on the reserve/COVID-19 list by the team on January 3, 2021, and activated on January 18.

On March 9, 2022, the Titans re-signed Tart to a one-year deal.

Entering the 2023 offseason as a restricted free agent, the Titans placed a second round tender on Tart on March 15, 2023.

On December 16, 2023, Tart was released.

=== Houston Texans ===
On December 18, 2023, Tart was claimed off waivers by the Houston Texans.

=== Miami Dolphins ===
On April 8, 2024, Tart signed with the Miami Dolphins. He was released on August 13.

=== Los Angeles Chargers ===
On August 15, 2024, Tart signed with the Los Angeles Chargers. He played in all 17 games with no starts as a rotational defensive tackle in 2024.

Tart re-signed with the team on March 18, 2025. After a strong 2025 season where he started all 17 games, Tart signed a three-year, $37.5 million contract extension with the Chargers on January 26, 2026.

== NFL career statistics ==
Legend
| **Bold** | Career high |

=== Regular season ===
| Year | Team | Games | | Tackles | | | | | Interceptions | | | | | | Fumbles | | | | |
| Year | Team | GP | GS | Cmb | Solo | Ast | Sck | TFL | Int | Yds | Avg | Lng | TD | PD | FF | Fum | FR | Yds | TD |
|---|---|---|---|---|---|---|---|---|---|---|---|---|---|---|---|---|---|---|---|
| 2020 | TEN | 7 | 1 | 5 | 2 | 3 | 0.0 | 1 | 0 | 0 | 0.0 | 0 | 0 | 1 | 0 | 0 | 0 | 0 | 0 |
| 2021 | TEN | 11 | 10 | 16 | 10 | 6 | 0.0 | 2 | 0 | 0 | 0.0 | 0 | 0 | 0 | 0 | 0 | 0 | 0 | 0 |
| 2022 | TEN | 16 | 16 | **34** | 20 | **14** | **1.5** | 5 | **1** | 0 | 0.0 | 0 | 0 | **6** | 0 | 0 | **1** | **1** | 0 |
| 2023 | TEN | 11 | 9 | 21 | 15 | 6 | 1.0 | **8** | 0 | 0 | 0.0 | 0 | 0 | 0 | 0 | 0 | 0 | 0 | 0 |
| 2023 | HOU | 2 | 0 | 3 | 2 | 1 | 0.0 | 0 | 0 | 0 | 0.0 | 0 | 0 | 0 | 0 | 0 | 0 | 0 | 0 |
| 2024 | LAC | 17 | 0 | 29 | 15 | **14** | 1.0 | 5 | **1** | **4** | **4.0** | **4** | 0 | 2 | **1** | **1** | **1** | 0 | 0 |
| 2025 | LAC | **17** | **17** | 32 | **22** | 10 | 0.0 | 4 | 0 | 0 | 0.0 | 0 | 0 | 4 | **1** | 0 | **1** | 0 | 0 |
| 2026 | LAC | 5 | 5 | 10 | 6 | 4 | 0.0 | 1 | 0 | 0 | 0.0 | 0 | 0 | 0 | 0 | 0 | 0 | 0 | 0 |
| Career | | 86 | 58 | 150 | 92 | 58 | 3.5 | 26 | 2 | 4 | 2.0 | 4 | 0 | 13 | 2 | 1 | 3 | 1 | 0 |

=== Postseason ===
| Year | Team | Games | | Tackles | | | | | Interceptions | | | | | | Fumbles | | | | |
| Year | Team | GP | GS | Cmb | Solo | Ast | Sck | TFL | Int | Yds | Avg | Lng | TD | PD | FF | Fum | FR | Yds | TD |
|---|---|---|---|---|---|---|---|---|---|---|---|---|---|---|---|---|---|---|---|
| 2024 | LAC | **1** | 0 | 3 | 2 | **1** | 0.0 | 0 | 0 | 0 | 0.0 | 0 | 0 | 0 | 0 | 0 | 0 | 0 | 0 |
| 2025 | LAC | **1** | **1** | **4** | **3** | **1** | **1.0** | **2** | 0 | 0 | 0.0 | 0 | 0 | **1** | 0 | 0 | 0 | 0 | 0 |
| Career | | 2 | 1 | 7 | 5 | 2 | 1.0 | 2 | 0 | 0 | 0.0 | 0 | 0 | 1 | 0 | 0 | 0 | 0 | 0 |
