= Daniel Munyer =

American football player (born 1992)

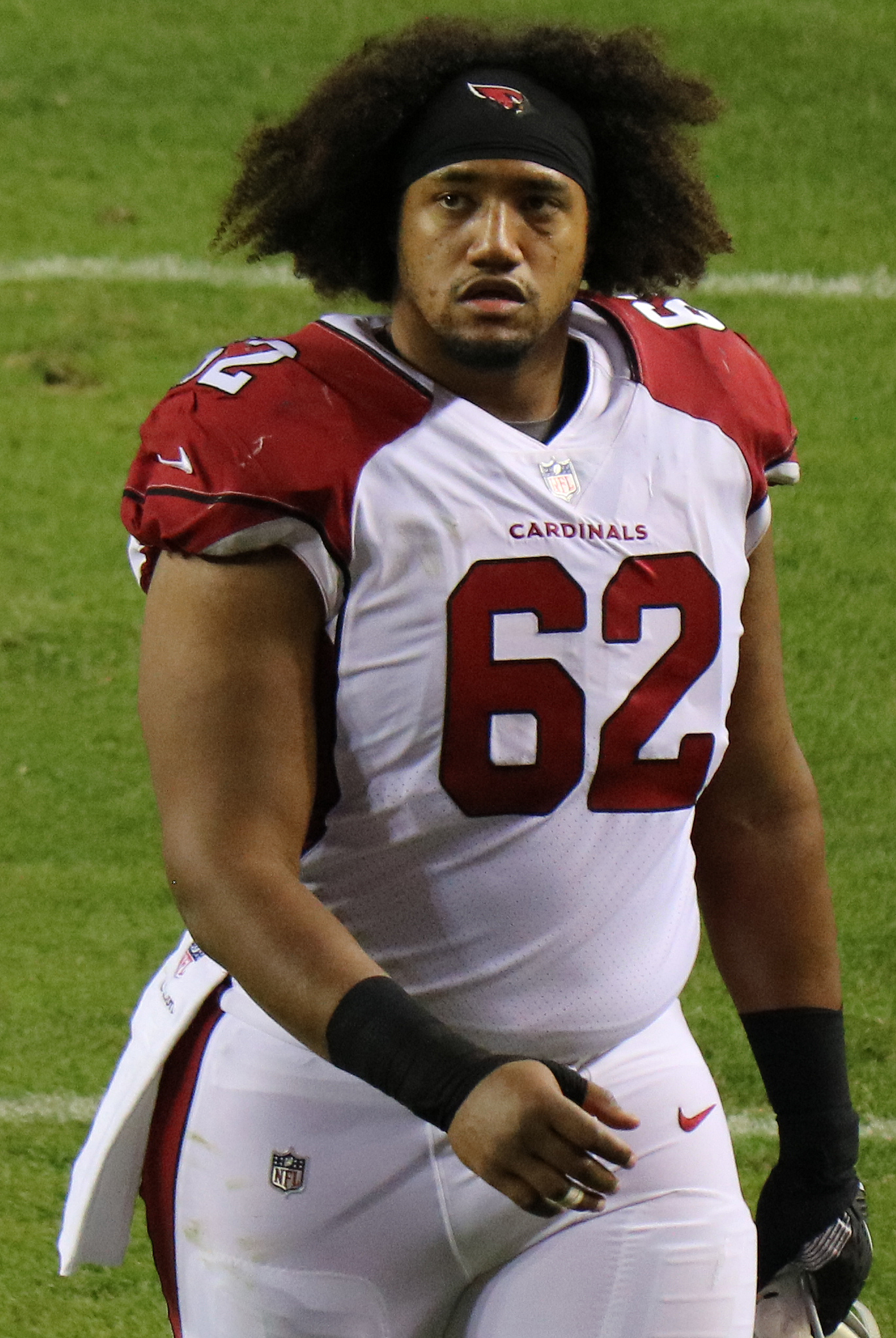
- Munyer in the 2017 NFL preseason.

No. 52, 62, 64, 69
- Position: Center

Personal information
- Born: March 4, 1992 (age 34); Harbor City, California
- Listed height: 6 ft 1 in (1.85 m)
- Listed weight: 305 lb (138 kg)

Career information
- High school: Notre Dame (Sherman Oaks, California)
- College: Colorado
- NFL draft: 2015: undrafted

Career history
- Kansas City Chiefs (2015–2016); Arizona Cardinals (2016–2018); Indianapolis Colts (2019)*; Tennessee Titans (2019–2022)
- * Offseason or practice squad member only

Career NFL statistics
- Games played: 21
- Games Started: 1
- Stats at Pro Football Reference

Daniel Munyer (born March 4, 1992) is an American former professional football player who was a center in the National Football League (NFL). He played college football for the Colorado Buffaloes and was signed by the Kansas City Chiefs as an undrafted free agent in 2015. He played in the NFL for the Chiefs, Arizona Cardinals, and Tennessee Titans.

== Professional career ==
=== Kansas City Chiefs ===
After going unselected in the 2015 NFL draft, Munyer signed with Kansas City Chiefs on May 19, 2015. He was waived before the start of the season for final roster cuts, but signed with the team's practice squad. On January 5, 2016, the Chiefs promoted Munyer to the active roster.

On September 3, 2016, Munyer was released by the Chiefs, and was signed to the practice squad the next day, only to be released two days later. He was re-signed to the practice squad on September 20 but was released on October 3.

=== Arizona Cardinals ===
On December 28, 2016, Munyer was signed to the Arizona Cardinals' practice squad. He signed a reserve/future contract with the Cardinals on January 3, 2017.

In 2017, Munyer made the Cardinals final roster, playing in one game before being placed on injured reserve on November 6, 2017.

On March 22, 2018, Munyer re-signed with the Cardinals.

=== Indianapolis Colts ===
On July 24, 2019, Munyer was signed by the Indianapolis Colts. He was released by Indianapolis on August 31.

=== Tennessee Titans ===
On October 8, 2019, Munyer was signed to the Tennessee Titans practice squad. He was released on November 5, but re-signed a week later. He signed a reserve/future contract with the Titans on January 20, 2020.

Munyer made the Titans initial 53-man roster to start the 2020 season. He was then waived on November 7, 2020, and re-signed to the practice squad three days later. He was elevated to the active roster on December 19 for the team's week 15 game against the Detroit Lions, and reverted to the practice squad after the game. He was elevated again on January 9, 2021, for the team's wild card playoff game against the Baltimore Ravens, and reverted to the practice squad again following the game. He signed a reserve/future contract with the Titans on January 11, 2021.

On September 2, 2021, Munyer was placed on injured reserve. He was activated on November 1, then waived three days later and re-signed to the practice squad. After the Titans were eliminated in the Divisional Round of the 2021 playoffs, he signed a reserve/future contract on January 24, 2022. He was placed on injured reserve on August 3, 2022. He was released on August 12, 2022. He was re-signed to the practice squad on December 20, 2022. He was promoted to the active roster two days later.

On November 18, 2023, Munyer announced his retirement from professional football.
