= Brandon Kemp =

American gridiron football player (born 1997)

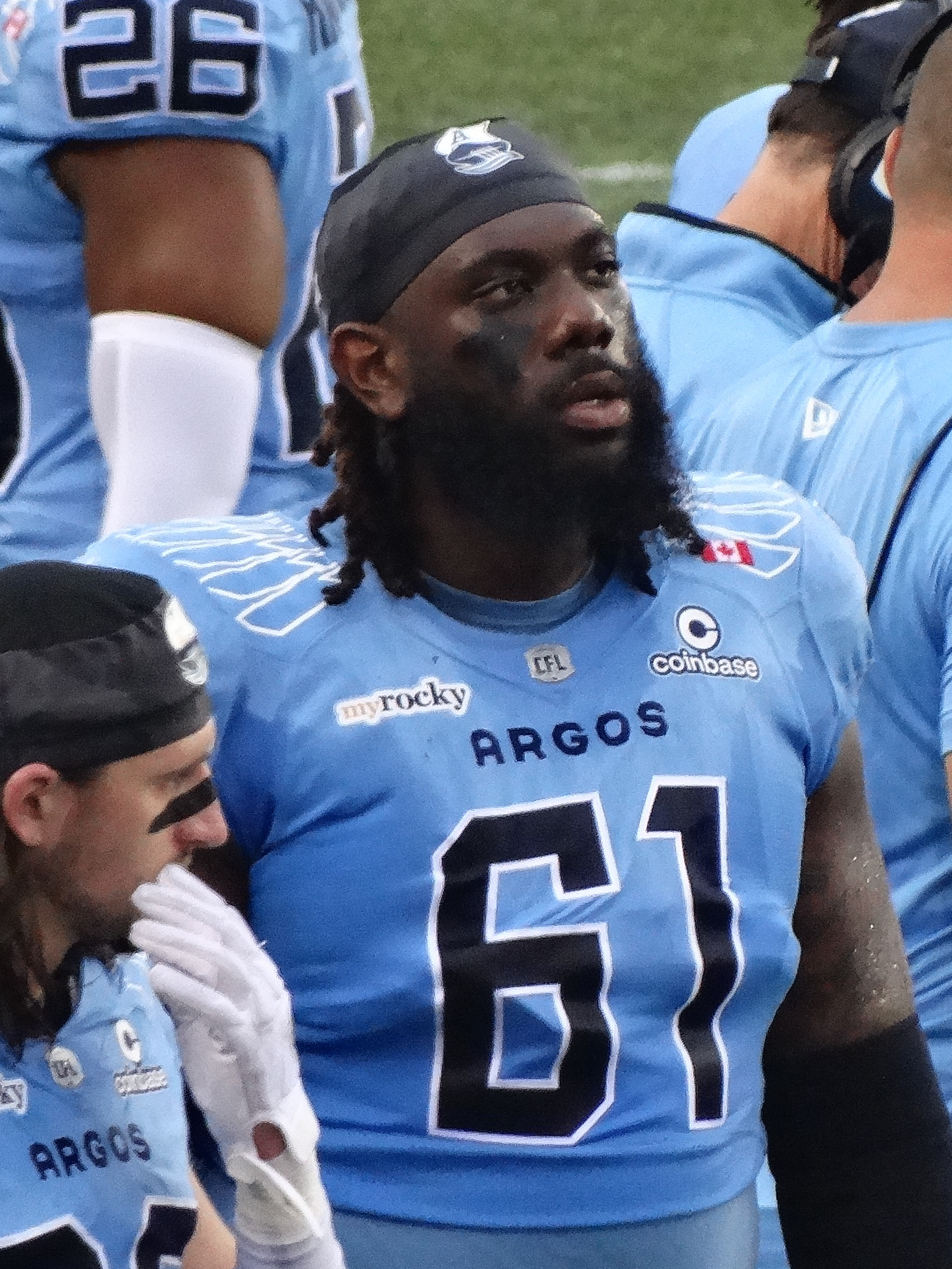
- Kemp with the Toronto Argonauts in 2026

No. 61 – Toronto Argonauts
- Position: Offensive lineman
- Roster status: Active
- CFL status: American

Personal information
- Born: January 18, 1997 (age 29); Atlanta, Georgia, U.S.
- Listed height: 6 ft 7 in (2.01 m)
- Listed weight: 310 lb (141 kg)

Career information
- High school: Columbia (Decatur, Georgia)
- College: Valdosta State (2015–2019)
- NFL draft: 2020: undrafted

Career history
- 2020–2021: Tennessee Titans
- 2022: Indianapolis Colts*
- 2022–2024: Hamilton Tiger-Cats
- 2025: Saskatchewan Roughriders*
- 2025: Massachusetts Pirates*
- 2025–present: Toronto Argonauts
- * Offseason or practice squad member only

Awards and highlights
- Division II national champion (2018); Second-team All-American (2019); 2× First-team All-GSC (2016, 2019); Second-team All-GSC (2018)
- Stats at Pro Football Reference
- Stats at CFL.ca

Brandon Kemp (born January 18, 1997) is an American professional football offensive lineman for the Toronto Argonauts of the Canadian Football League (CFL). He played college football at Valdosta State.

== Early life ==
Kemp played high school football at Columbia High School in Decatur, Georgia.

== College career ==
Kemp played college football at Valdosta State from 2015 to 2019. He was redshirted in 2015. He started 11 games in 2016, earning first team All-Gulf South Conference (GSC) honors. Kemp appeared in seven games, starting five, in 2017. He played in 12 games, starting 11, in 2018, garnering second team All-GSC recognition and helping Valdosta State win the NCAA Division II national championship. He appeared in 11 games in 2019, earning first team All-GSC and second team Associated Press Little All-America honors.

== Professional career ==
Pre-draft measurables
Height	Weight	Arm length	Hand span	Wingspan	40-yard dash	10-yard split	20-yard split	20-yard shuttle	Three-cone drill	Vertical jump	Broad jump	Bench press
6 ft 6 7/8 in (2.00 m)	317 lb (144 kg)	35 7/8 in (0.91 m)	9 3/8 in (0.24 m)	6 ft 10 in (2.08 m)	5.56 s	1.88 s	3.06 s	5.23 s	8.40 s	28.0 in (0.71 m)	8 ft 6 in (2.59 m)	19 reps
All values from Pro Day

Kemp signed with the Tennessee Titans of the National Football League (NFL) on May 7, 2020, after going undrafted in the 2020 NFL draft. He was waived on September 5 and signed to the team's practice squad on September 6, 2020. He was signed to a futures contract on January 11, 2021. Kemp was placed on injured reserve on July 31, 2021. He was released on April 7, 2022.

Kemp was signed by the Indianapolis Colts of the NFL on April 15, 2022. He was released on August 16, 2022.

Kemp signed with the Hamilton Tiger-Cats of the Canadian Football League (CFL) on September 20, 2022. He was placed on injured reserve on September 22, activated from injured reserve on October 28, and placed on injured reserve again on November 5, 2022. Overall, he played in one game, a start, for the Tiger-Cats in 2022. Kemp was moved to the practice roster on June 8, 2023. He was placed on, and activated from, injured reserve several times during the 2023 season. He appeared in 10 games, all starts, for the Tiger-Cats in 2023. Kemp was re-signed by the team on December 14, 2023.

On January 7, 2025, it was announced that Kemp had signed with the Saskatchewan Roughriders. He was part of the final cuts at the end of training camp on June 1, 2025.

On July 3, 2025, it was announced that Kemp had signed with the Massachusetts Pirates of the Indoor Football League (IFL).

On August 5, 2025, it was announced that Kemp had signed with the Toronto Argonauts.
