= Jon Robinson (American football) =

American football executive (born 1976)

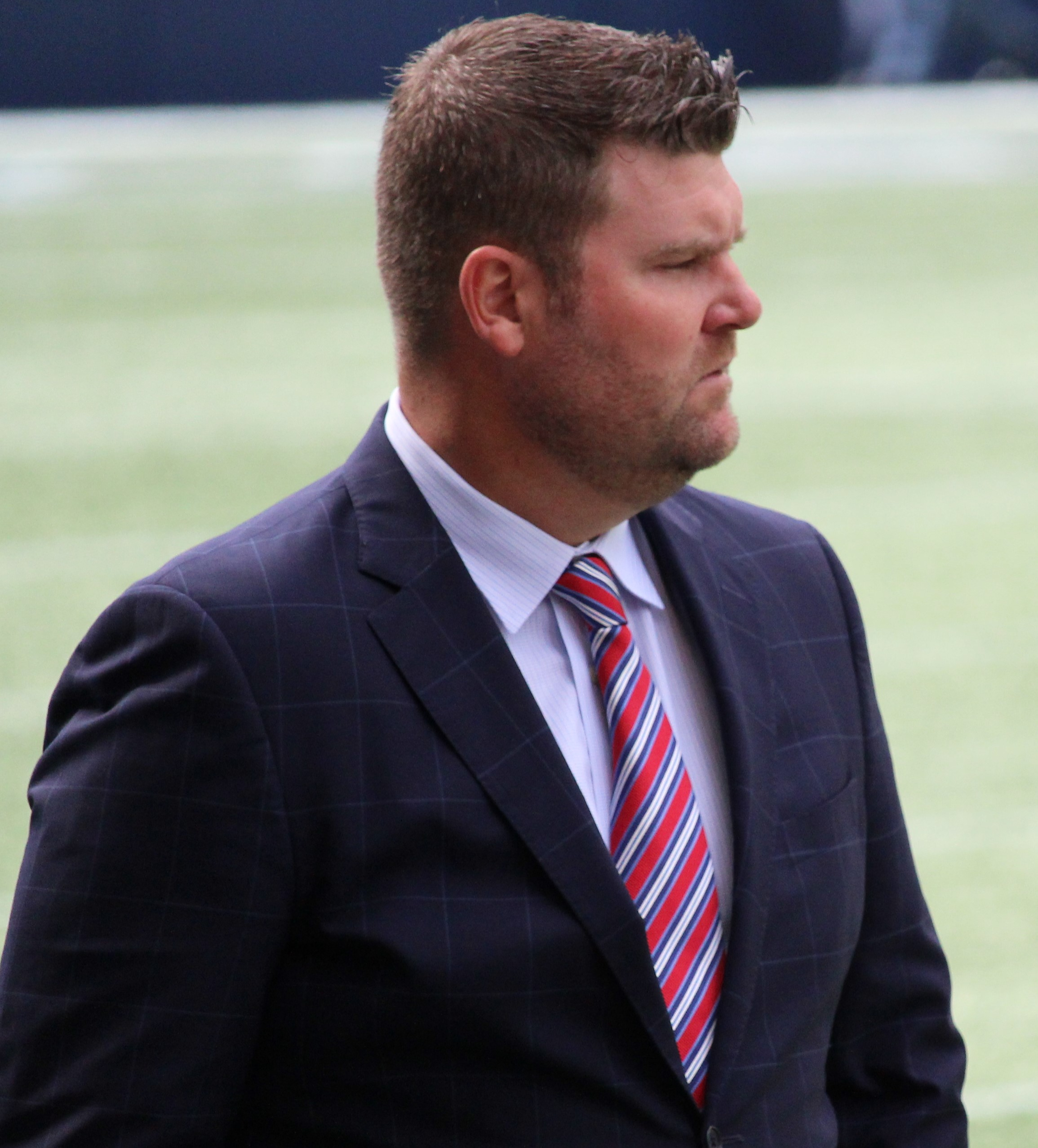
- Robinson in 2021

Miami Dolphins
- Title: Senior Personnel Executive

Personal information
- Born: January 18, 1976 (age 50); Union City, Tennessee, U.S.

Career information
- College: Southeast Missouri State

Career history

Coaching
- Southeast Missouri State (1998) Graduate assistant; Nicholls State (1999–2000) Graduate assistant; Nicholls State (2001) Linebackers coach

Operations
- New England Patriots (2002–2005) Area scout; New England Patriots (2006–2007) Regional scout; New England Patriots (2008) Assistant director of college scouting; New England Patriots (2009–2012) Director of college scouting; Tampa Bay Buccaneers (2013–2015) Director of player personnel; Tennessee Titans (2016–2022) General manager; Miami Dolphins (2026–present) Senior personnel executive

Awards and highlights
- 2× Super Bowl champion (XXXVIII, XXXIX)
- Executive profile at Pro Football Reference

Jonathan Thomas Robinson (born January 18, 1976) is an American professional football executive who is currently a senior personnel executive for the Miami Dolphins. He was a longtime scout for the New England Patriots of the National Football League (NFL) before being named director of player personnel for the Tampa Bay Buccaneers in 2013. From 2016 to 2022, Robinson was the general manager and executive vice president of the Tennessee Titans.

== College career ==
After high school, Robinson played football at the United States Air Force Academy for one season before transferring to Southeast Missouri State University where he played three seasons as a defensive lineman. He graduated from Southeast Missouri State in 1998 and joined the school's football team as a graduate assistant for one season. In 1999, he joined Nicholls State University as a graduate assistant for two seasons before serving as linebackers coach in 2001.

== Professional career ==
=== New England Patriots ===
Robinson became an area scout for the New England Patriots from 2002, a position he held until 2006, when he was promoted to a regional scout. In 2008, Robinson was promoted to the Patriots' assistant director of college scouting. The Patriots promoted him to director of college scouting in 2009.

=== Tampa Bay Buccaneers ===
In 2013, Robinson took the position of director of player personnel for the Tampa Bay Buccaneers.

=== Tennessee Titans ===
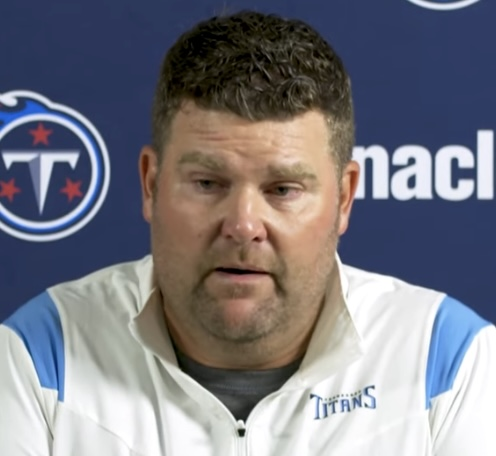
Robinson in 2021

On January 14, 2016, Robinson was hired as the general manager of the Tennessee Titans. He improved on the Titans' 2015 record of 3–13 to 9–7 in 2016. They missed the playoffs after a Week 16 road loss to the Jacksonville Jaguars.

On January 5, 2017, Robinson, while retaining his general manager position, was promoted to executive vice president. In 2017, the Titans once again went 9–7, but made the playoffs for the first time since 2008. They narrowly beat the Kansas City Chiefs in the Wild Card, but fell to the New England Patriots in the Divisional Round.

In 2018, the Titans went 9–7 again, but missed the playoffs in a Week 17 loss to the Indianapolis Colts.

In the 2019 offseason, Robinson signed Kevin Byard, one of Robinson's first draft picks in his first season with the Titans, to a record-breaking contract that made him the highest paid safety in the league at that point in time. Robinson also made a bold choice to trade for quarterback Ryan Tannehill, whose inconsistent play resulted in the Miami Dolphins' choice to move on. Despite Robinson claiming Tannehill was brought in to be Marcus Mariota's backup, this was done in the final year of Mariota's contract with the Titans and entered the 2019 season with no extension. After starting the season with a 2–4 record, head coach Mike Vrabel chose to bench Mariota and make Tannehill the starting quarterback for remainder of the season. The Titans finished the 2019 regular season with a 9–7 record for the fourth season in a row and made the playoffs. After beating both the Patriots and Baltimore Ravens in the Wild Card and Divisional Rounds, respectively, the Titans advanced to the AFC Championship for the first time since the 2002 season. The Chiefs would defeat the Titans with the final score being 35–24, ending the Titans' playoff run.

Robinson's choice to trade wide receiver A. J. Brown to the Philadelphia Eagles on Day 1 of the 2022 NFL draft for a first-round pick (18th overall) and using that pick for Treylon Burks instead of working out a contract extension with Brown was highly criticized. In Week 13 of the 2022 season, the Titans lost to the Eagles by a score of 35–10 and Brown recording eight receptions for 119 yards and two touchdowns. Two days after the loss, Robinson was fired by the Titans on December 6, 2022.

=== Miami Dolphins ===
On February 23, 2026, it was reported that Robinson would join the Miami Dolphins as a senior personnel executive under general manager Jon-Eric Sullivan.

=== Post-executive career ===
After being out of NFL for two years, Robinson interviewed for the general manager vacancy with the New York Jets in December 2024. The Jets chose to hire a different candidate with him losing to Darren Mougey.

In February 2025, Robinson would interview for another general manager vacancy with the Jacksonville Jaguars, but would lose out to James Gladstone.
