= NFL team captains =

Explanation and list of NFL captains

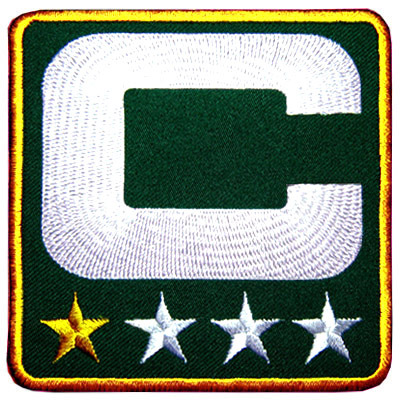
New York Jets 1st-year captain patch

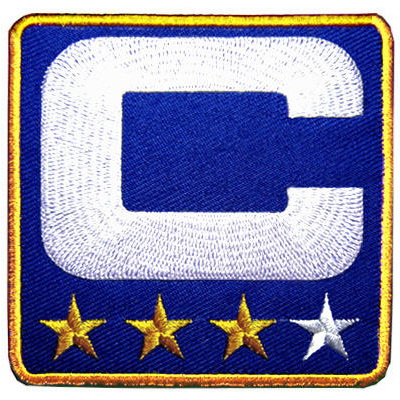
Indianapolis Colts 3rd-year captain patch

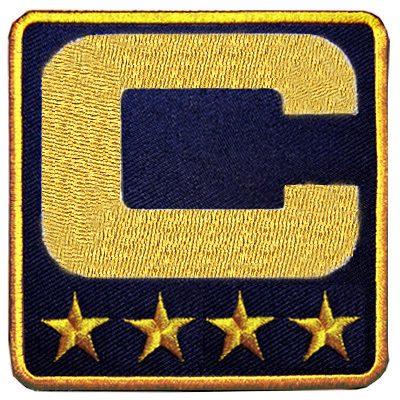
Chicago Bears 5+-year captain patch

In the National Football League (NFL), the team captain designation is a team-appointed position that designates certain players as leaders on and off the field. The captains program was implemented by the NFL Player Advisory Council established by NFL commissioner Roger Goodell in conjunction with the NFL Players Association. Starting in 2007, the league began permitting teams to name up to six players as captains.

== Designation ==
While NFL rules state that teams may name up to six captains, this rule is not strictly enforced. In 2019, four teams named seven captains at the beginning of the regular season: the Detroit Lions, Minnesota Vikings, New England Patriots, and New York Giants. That same year, the Carolina Panthers dressed seven players wearing captain patches for their week 2 matchup against Tampa Bay: Cam Newton, Greg Olsen, Trai Turner, Luke Kuechly, Gerald McCoy, Kawann Short, and Colin Jones. The Los Angeles Chargers and Los Angeles Rams named up to ten captains during the mid 2020s.

Captains are sometimes decided by team-wide vote, and other times are chosen by the team's head coach. Captains are generally named after the preseason ends, and just prior to the start of the regular season. In the event of an injury to a team captain requiring them to miss one or more games during the season, a replacement may be named. The decision to name (whether weekly or permanently) or not name captains rests with the head coach, who can suspend captainships should they so choose.

One notable example of suspension occurred when the New York Jets ended the use of designated team captains after an incident involving Santonio Holmes in a 2011 game. In the fourth quarter of the final game of the 2011 season against the Miami Dolphins, Holmes appeared to get into an argument with Jets offensive tackle Wayne Hunter while the team was huddling. As a result of the argument, Holmes was benched for the remainder of the game, and the Jets ended up losing the game, which resulted in the Jets missing the postseason for the first time in three years. Rex Ryan, coach of the Jets at the time, suspended the captains program for the organization. In 2015, under new head coach Todd Bowles, the Jets resumed appointing captains weekly. In Week 2 of 2018, Bowles resumed permanent captains, introduced when the Jets played the Dolphins.

Because of the nature of the game, most teams include their starting quarterbacks as an offensive captain. The starting quarterback has no other responsibility or authority on field. However, he may, depending on the league or individual team, have various informal duties, such as participation in pre-game ceremonies, the coin toss, the trophy presentation, or other events outside the game. Often compared to captains of other team sports, the starting quarterback is considered the team's leader, even before the NFL implemented the team captain's patch in 2007.

=== Jersey patch ===
Players who have been named a team captain typically wear a "C" patch on their jerseys. There is a standard design used by all teams participating in the captaincy program. The patches are in team colors and are worn on the front left or right breast (depending on other patches, etc. worn by the specific team). On some teams' color rush jerseys, plus the Cincinnati Bengals' white uniforms, the stars (and "C", for captains with over four years of service) use team colors. The number of gold stars on the patch represents the number of years that player has been named captain by a team, though not necessarily his current team; teams have often chose to recognize a player's years of captaincy with his previous team(s) upon changing teams. If he has been named captain for longer than four years, the "C" on the patch is gold.

Generally, the stars are consecutive, but there have been exceptions. For example, former Tampa Bay quarterback Jameis Winston wore three stars on his 2019 patch despite not being named a captain the previous season; he wore four stars on his 2021 patch for New Orleans. The Panthers gave Trai Turner a gold patch in week 8 of their 2019 season after he missed 3 games due to an ankle injury, though he wore a patch with only 1 star during his previous game in week 3. Case Keenum wore a patch with two stars in week 1 of the 2019 season, but from week 2 on Keenum wore a captain's patch with 4 stars, despite only serving as a captain two seasons of his career. Teams have often used captains patches erroneously and without regard to the stars, with discrepancies occurring even mid-season. In 2017, Buffalo Bills defensive tackle Kyle Williams wore a patch with 5 stars and a gold 'C', but the Bills admitted this was a mistake.

By and large, teams do not adorn the jerseys of weekly captains with patches. However, in 2019 the Carolina Panthers voted Gerald McCoy as a captain for their Week 2 matchup with the Tampa Bay Buccaneers and affixed a patch to his jersey. He continued wearing the patch as the season continued in light of an injury to Kawann Short. Similarly, London native Efe Obada was voted a team captain for the Panthers' game there in 2019, wearing the patch for a single game.

During special recognitions, the patch may be a different color such as pink for breast cancer awareness or camouflage for military service recognition. In 2018, NFL began a partnership with the American Cancer Society using a multi-color captain patch. In 2019, the NFL changed captains' patches slightly, removing the white outline at the patch's edge. Also, instead of stars "filled-in" with gold coloring to indicate years as a captain alongside "unfilled-in" white stars (i.e. a player who was in his second year as a captain would have 2 gold stars and 2 white stars on his patch), the patch now simply has gold stars indicating years served. Each gold star on a captain's patch indicates the number of seasons the player has served as a team captain.

Some teams (e.g. Pittsburgh and New England under former head coach Bill Belichick) do not use the patch on their jerseys but still designate captains. The decision to wear or not wear patches can come from the coach or a team vote. Pittsburgh had never used captains patches during the tenure of head coach Mike Tomlin, although they have named permanent captains. To date, they are the only team to have never worn patches. Baltimore had never worn patches either until John Harbaugh surprisingly began using playoff captains in 2025, donning patches for the first time in franchise history. Some coaches, notably Mike McCarthy and Andy Reid, only name permanent captains for the playoffs, who wear patches for their teams' entire postseason runs, instead of week-by-week. McCarthy began this practice in Green Bay and continued it upon being hired by Dallas.

== List of current captains ==
Players listed in bold currently wear 4+ star all-gold captain patches. These players have been team captains for at least four seasons, but not necessarily consecutively.

†Indicates teams not using captain patches during the 2026 regular season.

*Indicates the number of years a player has served as a captain, represented on the patch by stars.

^Indicates players named as captains who are not wearing patches.

List of NFL team captains as of the 2026 season
| Team | Offense | Defense | Special teams |
|---|---|---|---|
| Arizona Cardinals | Jacoby Brissett***, Hjalte Froholdt**, Trey McBride* | **Budda Baker**, Mack Wilson** | Casey Kreiter*** |
| Atlanta Falcons | Chris Lindstrom***, Bijan Robinson* | **Jessie Bates**, Divine Deablo* | Nick Folk* |
| Baltimore Ravens | **Derrick Henry**, Lamar Jackson* | **Calais Campbell**, Kyle Hamilton*, Roquan Smith** | None |
| Buffalo Bills | **Josh Allen**, Dawson Knox* | Terrel Bernard***, Bradley Chubb*** | Reid Ferguson****, Sam Franklin Jr.** |
| Carolina Panthers | Chuba Hubbard*, Bryce Young**** | Derrick Brown***, Devin Lloyd* | JJ Jansen**** |
| Chicago Bears | Joe Thuney**, Caleb Williams*** | Grady Jarrett**, T. J. Edwards** | Cairo Santos** |
| Cincinnati Bengals | **Joe Burrow**, Ja’Marr Chase**, **Ted Karras** | Bryan Cook*, **Dexter Lawrence II**, DJ Turner II* | Evan McPherson** |
| Cleveland Browns† | Appointed weekly | | |
| Dallas Cowboys | **Dak Prescott** | Kenny Clark***, Quinnen Williams**** | Brandon Aubrey*** |
| Denver Broncos | Quinn Meinerz***, Bo Nix***, **Courtland Sutton** | Talanoa Hufanga**, D.J. Jones**, Alex Singleton****, Patrick Surtain II*** | Wil Lutz***, Devon Key* |
| Detroit Lions | **Jared Goff**, Penei Sewell****, Amon-Ra St. Brown**** | Jack Campbell*, Aidan Hutchinson***, Alim McNeill* | Jack Fox* |
| Green Bay Packers | Tucker Kraft**, Jordan Love** | **Zaire Franklin**, Xavier McKinney**** | Isaiah McDuffie** |
| Houston Texans | C.J. Stroud**** | Azeez Al-Shaair****, Will Anderson Jr.****, Jalen Pitre** | None |
| Indianapolis Colts | **Daniel Jones**, Jonathan Taylor*** | **DeForest Buckner**, Cam Bynum* | None |
| Jacksonville Jaguars | Robert Hainsey**, **Trevor Lawrence**, Jakobi Meyers* | **Josh Hines-Allen**, Jourdan Lewis**, **Foye Oluokun** | Logan Cooke****, Ross Matiscik* |
| Kansas City Chiefs† | Appointed weekly | | |
| Las Vegas Raiders† | Appointed weekly | | |
| Los Angeles Chargers | Joe Alt**, **Justin Herbert**, Ladd McConkey^, Rashawn Slater** | Daiyan Henley**, **Derwin James**, **Khalil Mack**, Elijah Molden^, Tuli Tuipulotu* | Josh Harris** |
| Los Angeles Rams | **Davante Adams**, Tyler Higbee**, Coleman Shelton*, **Matthew Stafford**, Kyren Williams** | **Myles Garrett**, Quentin Lake***, Nate Landman**, Trent McDuffie***, Kobie Turner*** | Joe Cardona** |
| Miami Dolphins | De’Von Achane*, Aaron Brewer**, Patrick Paul*, Malik Willis* | Jordyn Brooks**, Zach Sieler*** | None |
| Minnesota Vikings | Justin Jefferson****, Aaron Jones***, **Kyler Murray**, **Brian O’Neill** | Blake Cashman**, **Josh Metellus**, Andrew Van Ginkel* | Andrew DePaola**** |
| New England Patriots | **Hunter Henry**, Drake Maye**, Morgan Moses*** | Marcus Jones**, Robert Spillane****, **Kevin Byard III** | None |
| New Orleans Saints | Erik McCoy****, David Edwards*, Tyler Shough* | **Cameron Jordan**, Justin Reid**, Chase Young***, Kaden Elliss**, Chris Rumph II* | Zach Wood**** |
| New York Giants† | Appointed weekly | | |
| New York Jets | Geno Smith***, Joe Tippmann* | **Demario Davis**, Minkah Fitzpatrick*, Harrison Phillips** | Isaiah Williams* |
| Philadelphia Eagles | **Saquon Barkley**, **Jalen Hurts**, **Lane Johnson**, Jordan Mailata***, DeVonta Smith** | Zack Baun**, Jordan Davis* | None |
| Pittsburgh Steelers† | Appointed weekly | | |
| San Francisco 49ers | Kyle Juszczyk***, **George Kittle**, Christian McCaffrey***, Brock Purdy****, **Trent Williams** | Nick Bosa****, Deommodore Lenoir**, **Fred Warner** | None |
| Seattle Seahawks† | Appointed weekly | | |
| Tampa Bay Buccaneers | Chris Godwin**, **Baker Mayfield**, Tristan Wirfs**** | **Alex Anzalone**, **Vita Vea**, Antoine Winfield Jr.**** | None |
| Tennessee Titans | Cam Ward** | Amani Hooker** | Morgan Cox**** |
| Washington Commanders | Jayden Daniels**, **Marcus Mariota,** **Terry McLaurin** | Frankie Luvu**, Jeremy Reaves*** | **Tress Way** |
