= Amani Hooker =

American football player (born 1998)

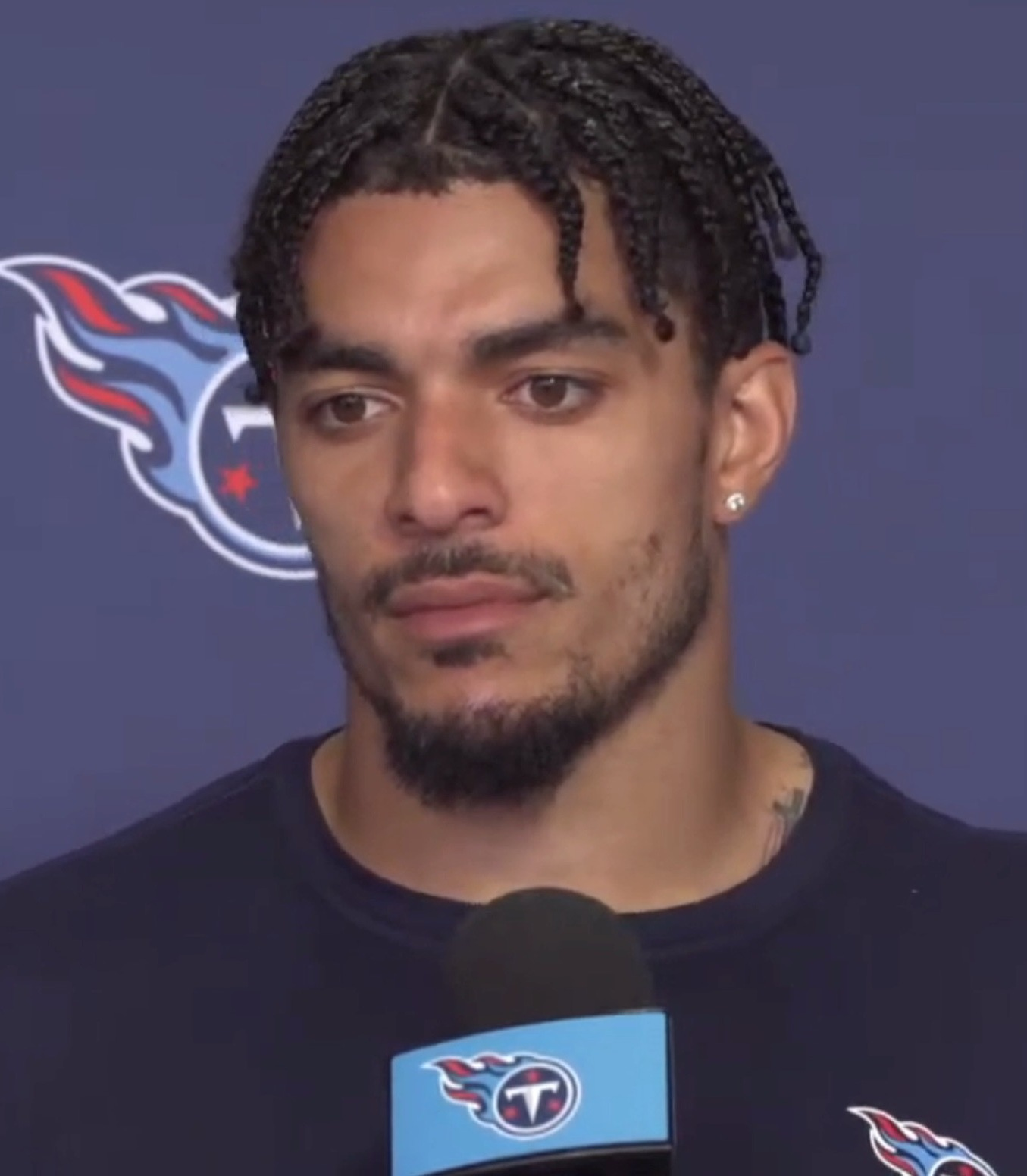
- Hooker in 2022

No. 22 – Buffalo Bills
- Position: Safety
- Roster status: Active

Personal information
- Born: June 14, 1998 (age 28); Minneapolis, Minnesota, U.S.
- Listed height: 5 ft 11 in (1.80 m)
- Listed weight: 210 lb (95 kg)

Career information
- High school: Park Center (Brooklyn Park, Minnesota)
- College: Iowa (2016–2018)
- NFL draft: 2019: 4th round, 116th overall pick

Career history
- Tennessee Titans (2019–2026); Buffalo Bills (2026–present)

Awards and highlights
- Big Ten Defensive Back of the Year (2018); Second-team All-American (2018)

Career NFL statistics as of Week 11, 2026
- Tackles: 477
- Sacks: 1.0
- Forced fumbles: 5
- Fumble recoveries: 2
- Pass deflections: 47
- Interceptions: 17
- Stats at Pro Football Reference

Amani Corvelle Hooker (born June 14, 1998) is an American professional football safety for the Buffalo Bills of the National Football League (NFL). He played college football for the Iowa Hawkeyes and was selected by the Titans in the fourth round of the 2019 NFL draft.

== Early life ==
Hooker attended Park Center Senior High School in Brooklyn Park, Minnesota. He committed to the University of Iowa to play college football.

== College career ==
Hooker played at Iowa from 2016 to 2018. During his career, he had 125 tackles, six interceptions, one sack, and one touchdown. As a junior in 2018, he was the Tatum-Woodson Big Ten Conference Defensive Back of the Year after recording 65 tackles, four interceptions, and one sack. Hooker skipped his senior year to enter the 2019 NFL draft.

== Professional career ==
=== Pre-draft ===
Pro Football Focus ranked him as the fourth best safety in the draft. ESPN analyst Jeff Legwold ranked Hooker as the ninth best safety prospect (72nd overall) in the draft. He was also ranked as the ninth best safety (82nd overall) by Sports Illustrated.

Pre-draft measurables
Height	Weight	Arm length	Hand span	Wingspan	40-yard dash	10-yard split	20-yard split	20-yard shuttle	Three-cone drill	Vertical jump	Broad jump	Bench press
5 ft 11 3/8 in (1.81 m)	210 lb (95 kg)	30 1/8 in (0.77 m)	9 1/8 in (0.23 m)	6 ft 0 3/8 in (1.84 m)	4.48 s	1.52 s	2.60 s	4.10 s	6.81 s	37.0 in (0.94 m)	10 ft 3 in (3.12 m)	14 reps
All values from NFL Combine

=== Tennessee Titans ===
==== 2019 ====
The Tennessee Titans selected Hooker in the fourth round (116th overall) of the 2019 NFL draft. In order to draft Hooker, the Tennessee Titans executed a trade that sent their fourth (121st overall) and fifth round (157th overall) picks in the 2019 NFL Draft to the New York Jets and in return received the fourth round pick (116th overall) used to draft Hooker, as well as a fifth round pick (168th overall). He was the 11th safety drafted in 2019.

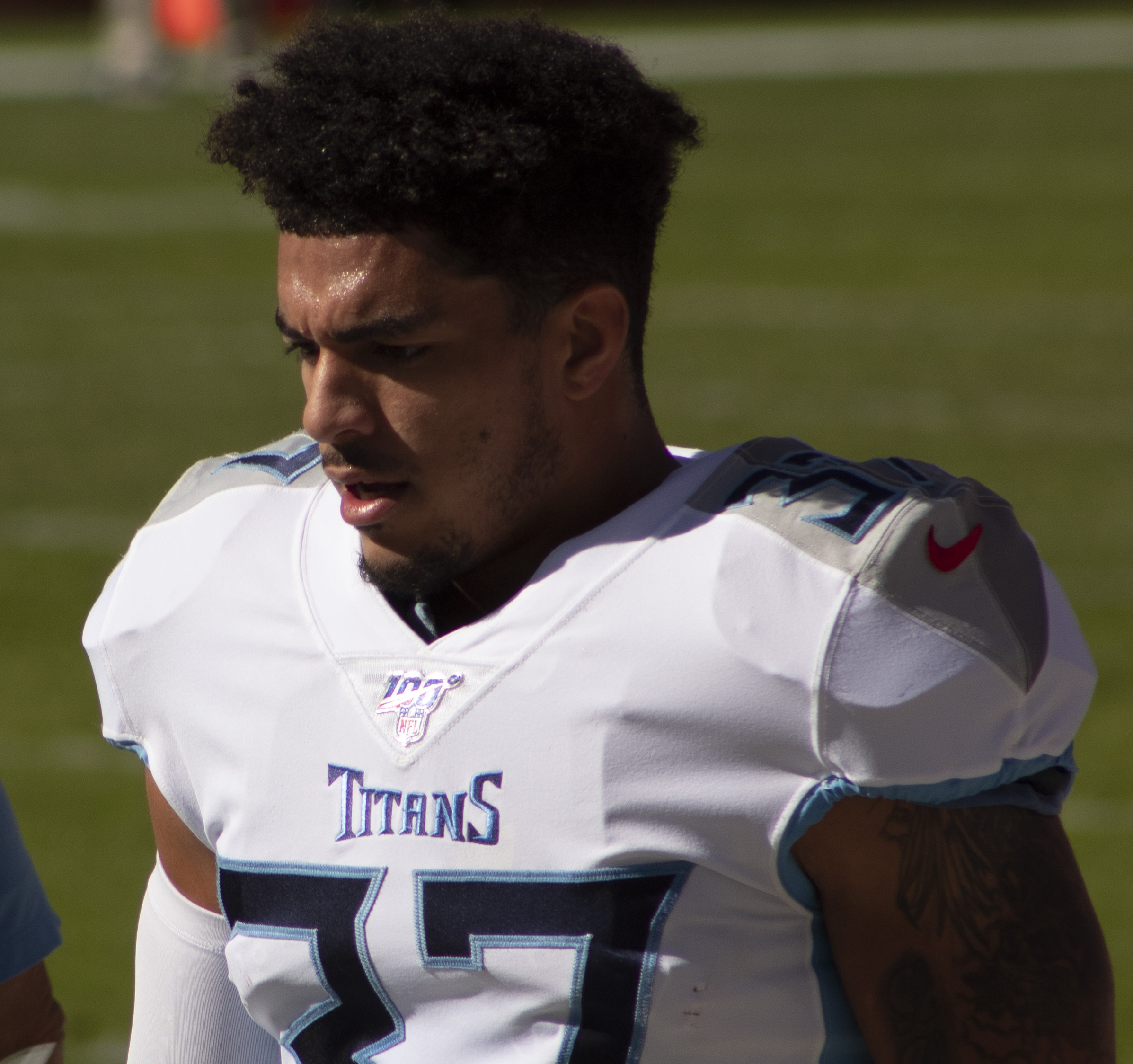
Hooker with the Titans in 2019

External videos
- Titans draft Amani Hooker 116th overall

On May 15, 2019, the Tennessee Titans signed Hooker to a four–year, $3.25 million contract that includes a signing bonus of $733,480.

Throughout training camp, Hooker competed against Dane Cruikshank, Joshua Kalu, and LaDarius Wiley. Head coach Mike Vrabel named Hooker the third free safety on the depth chart, behind starter Kevin Byard and primary backup Joshua Kalu.

On September 8, 2019, Hooker made his professional regular season debut in a 43–17 win at the Cleveland Browns. In Week 4, he collected a season-high four combined tackles (three solo) in the Titans' 24–10 win at the Atlanta Falcons. He finished his rookie season in 2019 NFL season and played in all 16 games, primarily on special teams, and finished with a total of 20 combined tackles (15 solo).

The Tennessee Titans finished second in the AFC South with a 9–7 record and qualified for a playoff berth. On January 4, 2020, Hooker appeared in his first career playoff game and made one tackle in a 24–10 win at the New England Patriots in the AFC Wildcard Game. On January 19, 2020, Hooker made the first catch of his career on a 28-yard reception by punter Brett Kern in the Titans' 24–35 loss at the Kansas City Chiefs in the AFC Championship Game.

==== 2020 ====
Hooker was slated to resume his role as a backup safety and appear on special teams. During training camp, he also competed to be the primary slot cornerback against rookie cornerback Kristian Fulton. Head coach Mike Vrabel named him the primary backup safety to kickoff the season, behind starters Kevin Byard and Kenny Vaccaro.

On September 27, 2020, Hooker made one solo tackle, a pass deflection, and made his first career interception during a 31–30 win at the Minnesota Vikings. He sealed the victory in the fourth quarter after intercepting a pass by Kirk Cousins intended for wide receiver Adam Thielen, but was deflected by teammate Kevin Byard. In Week 9, he collected a season-high nine combined tackles (six solo) during a 24–17 win against the Chicago Bears. In the 2020 season. On November 22, 2020, Hooker earned his first career start after Kenny Vaccaro was inactive due to a concussion and recorded six combined tackles (three solo), deflected two passes, and intercepted a pass attempt to Devin Duvernay thrown by Lamar Jackson during a 30–24 victory at the Baltimore Ravens. He finished the 2020 NFL season with a total of 51 combined tackles (35 solo), eight pass deflections, and four interceptions in 16 games and three starts. The Tennessee Titans finished 2020 first in the AFC South with an 11–5 record and advanced to the playoffs where they were eliminated after a 13–20 loss to the Baltimore Ravens in the AFC Wildcard Game. He received an overall grade of 66.6 from Pro Football Focus in 2020.

==== 2021 ====
Following the release of Kenny Vaccaro, Hooker competed against Dane Cruikshank and Matthias Farley in training camp to takeover at starting free safety. Outside linebackers coach Shane Bowen was promoted to defensive coordinator and subsequently named Hooker and Kevin Byard the starting safeties to start the season.

On September 12, 2021, he started the Tennessee Titans' home-opener and made six solo tackles and a six-yard reception before injuring his foot and exiting the 13–38 loss to the Arizona Cardinals. On September 14, 2021, he was officially placed on injured reserve and missed the next four games (Weeks 2–5). On October 18, 2021, he was officially activated off of injured reserve. Hooker was inactive for the Titans' Week 7 victory over the Kansas City Chiefs due to a groin injury. In Week 9, he collected a season-high 12 combined tackles (eight solo) during a 28–16 win at the Los Angeles Rams. Hooker finished the season with 62 combined tackles (38 solo), four pass deflections, one interception, and a forced fumble while starting all 12 games he appeared in. He received an overall grade of 85.9 from Pro Football Focus in 2021 and was named their most improved player on the Tennessee Titans.

The Tennessee Titans completed the 2021 NFL season atop the AFC South with a 12–5 record, earning them a first round bye. On January 22, 2022, Hooker started in the playoffs for the first time in his career and recorded eight combined tackles (four solo), two pass deflections, and intercepted a pass to Samaje Perine from Joe Burrow in a 16–19 loss to the Cincinnati Bengals in the AFC Divisional Game.

==== 2022 ====
On September 9, 2022, the Tennessee Titans signed Hooker to a three–year, $33 million contract extension that includes $17.15 million guaranteed and a signing bonus of $10.00 million. Hooker and Kevin Byard entered training camp slated as the presumed starting safeties. Head coach Mike Vrabel officially named them the starting safety tandem to begin the season, alongside starting cornerbacks Kristian Fulton and Caleb Farley.

Hooker sustained a concussion and was inactive for two games (Weeks 4–5). In Week 7, he recorded a season-high ten combined tackles (nine solo) and recovered a fumble during a 19–10 win against the Indianapolis Colts. The following week, Hooker suffered a shoulder injury during a 17–10 victory at the Houston Texans and was sidelined for the next three games (Weeks 9–11). He injured his knee and subsequently missed three more games (Weeks 15–17). He finished the 2022 NFL season with a total of 46 combined tackles (39 solo), three pass deflections, an interception, one forced fumble, and a fumble recovery while being limited to nine games and nine starts. The Tennessee Titans did not qualify for a playoff berth after ending the season with a 7–9 record.

==== 2023 ====
Defensive coordinator Shane Bowen retained Hooker as the starting free safety, alongside Kevin Byard, to kick off the regular season. On September 10, 2023, Hooker made five combined tackles (three solo), two pass deflections, a forced fumble, a fumble recovery, and intercepted a pass by Derek Carr intended for Juwan Johnson, but exited the 16–15 loss at the New Orleans Saints in the second quarter due to a concussion. He was subsequently inactive the following week as the Titans won 27–24 against the Los Angeles Chargers. In Week 3, he collected a season-high 11 combined tackles (nine solo) in a 27-3 loss at the Cleveland Browns. During Week 13 against the Indianapolis Colts, he scored a rare defensive two-point conversion after intercepting a tipped pass thrown by Gardner Minshew and returning it 100 yards. On December 22, 2023, the Tennessee Titans officially placed Hooker on injured reserve due to a knee injury and he remained inactive for the last three games (Weeks 16–18). Throughout the season, he recorded 85 combined tackles (69 solo), seven pass deflections, one interception, one forced fumble, and a fumble recovery in 13 games and 13 starts.

==== 2024 ====
On January 9, 2024, the Tennessee Titans announced the firing of head coach Mike Vrabel after finishing the 2023 NFL season with a 6–11 record. On January 22, 2024, the Tennessee Titans officially hired Cincinnati Bengals' offensive coordinator Brian Callahan as their head coach. Throughout training camp, Hooker competed Quandre Diggs, Elijah Molden, and Jamal Adams for a role as a starting safety under new defensive coordinator Dennard Wilson. Hooker was named the starting strong safety to begin the season, alongside free safety Quandre Diggs.

On October 13, 2024, Hooker got his first interception of the season by picking off Indianapolis Colts quarterback Joe Flacco in Week 6 of the 2024 season. On November 3, 2024, Hooker recorded five combined tackles (three solo), a then career-high three pass deflections, and had a career-high two interceptions off of pass attempts by Drake Maye in a 20–17 overtime win against the New England Patriots. The following week, he collected a season-high seven combined tackles (five solo) as the Titans were defeated 14–52 at the Detroit Lions. On December 22, 2024, Hooker made five combined tackles (four solo), one pass deflection, and set a career-high with his fifth interception of the season off a pass attempt by Anthony Richardson to Andrew Ogletree during a 30–38 loss at the Indianapolis Colts. He injured his shoulder during the game and subsequently missed the remaining two games of the season (Weeks 17-18). He finished the season with 71 combined tackles (47 solo), a career-high nine pass deflections, five interceptions, and two forced fumbles in 14 games and 14 starts. and was named as an alternate to the 2025 Pro Bowl.

==== 2025 ====
On September 6, 2025, Hooker signed a three-year, $48.6 million contract extension through the 2028 season.

==== 2026 ====
On July 23, 2026, Hooker was placed on the physically unable to perform (PUP) list. He was activated off of the list the next week on July 28.

On November 1 during Week 8, Hooker recorded a career-high three interceptions off of quarterback Joe Burrow in a 43–36 overtime road loss to the Cincinnati Bengals.

=== Buffalo Bills ===
On November 10, Hooker was traded to the Buffalo Bills alongside a 2027 fifth-round pick in exchange for a 2027 second-round pick.

== NFL career statistics ==
Legend
**Bold**	Career high

Year	Team	Games		Tackles					Fumbles				Interceptions					
Year	Team	GP	GS	Cmb	Solo	Ast	Sck	TFL	FF	Fum	FR	Yds	Int	Yds	Avg	Lng	TD	PD
2019	TEN	16	0	20	15	5	0.0	0	0	0	0	0	0	0	0.0	0	0	0
2020	TEN	16	3	51	35	16	0.0	1	0	0	0	0	4	11	2.7	6	0	8
2021	TEN	12	12	62	38	**24**	0.0	1	1	0	0	0	1	21	21	21	0	4
2022	TEN	9	9	46	39	7	0.0	1	1	**1**	**1**	0	1	0	0.0	0	0	3
2023	TEN	13	13	**85**	**69**	16	0.0	3	1	0	**1**	0	1	10	10.0	10	0	7
2024	TEN	14	14	71	47	**24**	0.0	**4**	**2**	0	0	0	**5**	68	13.6	30	0	**9**
2025	TEN	16	16	81	58	23	**1.0**	3	0	0	0	0	0	0	0.0	0	0	8
2026	TEN	7	7	52	33	19	0.0	1	0	0	0	0	**5**	**114**	**22.8**	**92**	0	6
2026	BUF	2	2	9	6	3	0.0	0	0	0	0	0	0	0	0.0	0	0	2
Career		105	76	477	340	137	1.0	14	5	1	2	0	17	224	13.2	92	0	47

=== Postseason ===
Year	Team	Games		Tackles					Fumbles				Interceptions					
Year	Team	GP	GS	Cmb	Solo	Ast	Sck	TFL	FF	Fum	FR	Yds	Int	Yds	Avg	Lng	TD	PD
2019	TEN	3	0	3	2	1	0.0	0	0	0	0	0	0	0	0.0	0	0	0
2020	TEN	1	0	0	0	0	0.0	0	0	0	0	0	0	0	0.0	0	0	0
2021	TEN	1	1	**8**	**5**	**3**	0.0	0	0	0	0	0	**1**	**15**	**15.0**	**15**	0	**2**
Career		5	1	11	7	4	0.0	0	0	0	0	0	1	15	15.0	15	0	2

== Personal life ==
His brother, Quinton, is a professional basketball player who was named Minnesota Mr. Basketball in 2013.
