= Football captains =

Football captains may refer to:

- Captain (association football), a team captain of an association football team
- National Football League team captains, a team captain in a National Football League team
