= Elijah Molden =

American football player (born 1999)

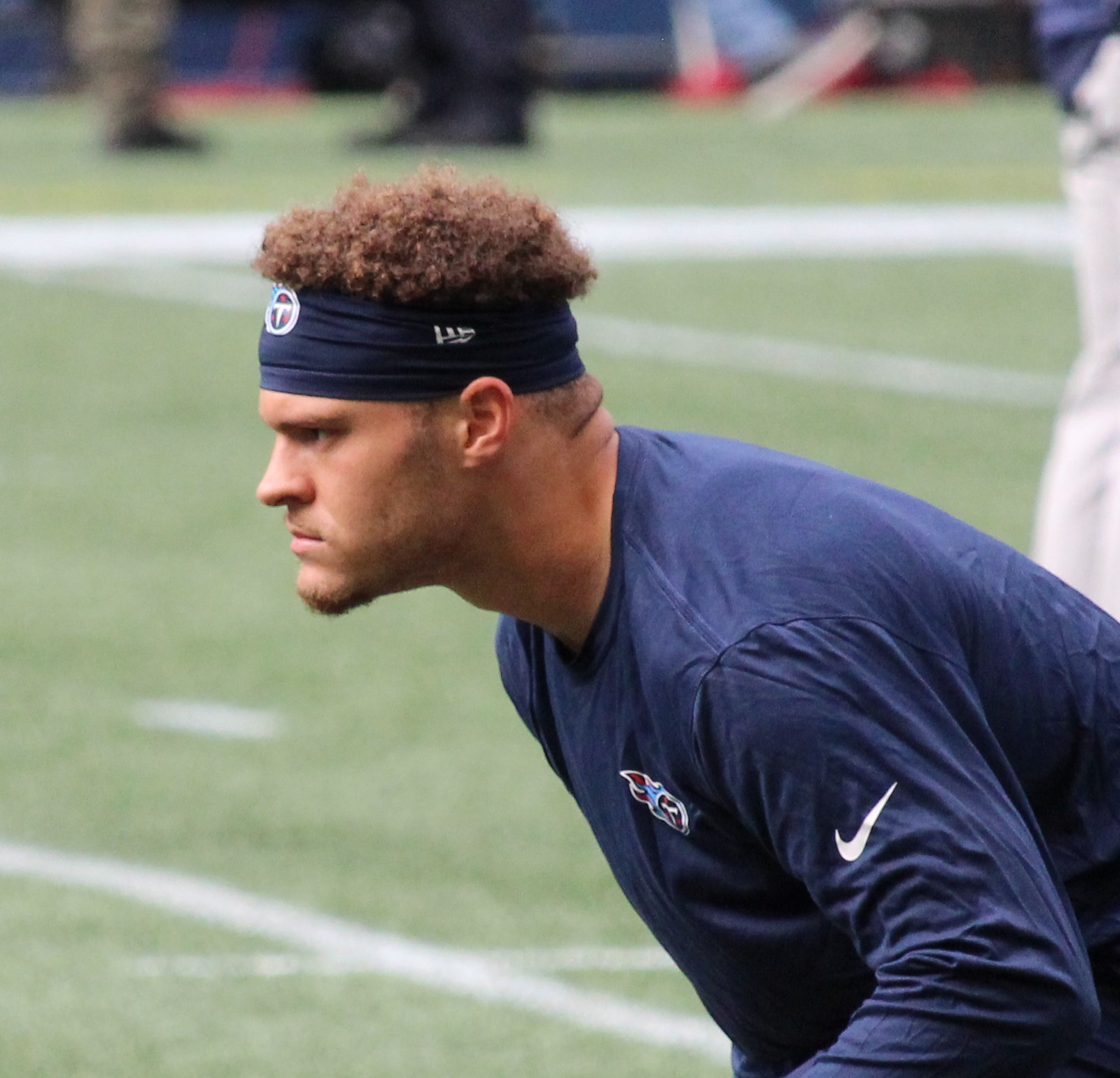
- Molden with the Tennessee Titans in 2021

No. 2 – Los Angeles Chargers
- Position: Safety
- Roster status: Active

Personal information
- Born: January 30, 1999 (age 27); New Orleans, Louisiana, U.S.
- Listed height: 5 ft 10 in (1.78 m)
- Listed weight: 192 lb (87 kg)

Career information
- High school: West Linn (West Linn, Oregon)
- College: Washington (2017–2020)
- NFL draft: 2021: 3rd round, 100th overall pick

Career history
- Tennessee Titans (2021–2023); Los Angeles Chargers (2024–present)

Awards and highlights
- 2× First-team All-Pac 12 (2019, 2020); Second-team All-Pac-12 (2018)

Career NFL statistics as of Week 5, 2026
- Total tackles: 284
- Forced fumbles: 2
- Fumble recoveries: 4
- Pass deflections: 16
- Interceptions: 6
- Defensive touchdowns: 2
- Stats at Pro Football Reference

Elijah Monroe Molden (born January 30, 1999) is an American professional football safety for the Los Angeles Chargers of the National Football League (NFL). In 2024, Molden played safety, cornerback, and some snaps at nickelback for the Chargers. He played college football for the Washington Huskies and was selected by the Tennessee Titans in the third round of the 2021 NFL draft.

== Early life ==
Molden attended West Linn High School in West Linn, Oregon. He played cornerback and running back in high school. In 2014, his sophomore year, West Linn went 8-3 and advanced to the state's 6A quarterfinals. He rushed for 784 yards on 110 carries, with nine rushing touchdowns and had 38 receptions for 542 yards and seven receiving touchdowns.

As a junior in 2015, Molden helped lead West Linn to a 12–2 mark and a berth in the 6A state title game. He rushed for 1,071 yards on 106 carries, with seventeen rushing touchdowns and had 476 receiving yards on 28 receptions with six receiving touchdowns. Molden earned first-team All-Three Rivers League on both offense and defense. In his senior season, Molden helped lead the West Linn to a 14–0 record, including a 62–7 victory in the 6A state championship game. He rushed for 784 yards on 59 carries, with ten rushing touchdowns. He averaged 11.3 yards per rushing attempt. Receiving, Molden caught 19 passes for 249 and six receiving touchdowns. On defense, he recorded three interceptions.

After his senior season, Molden was a nationally ranked recruit. ESPN listed him as the # 2 ranked prospect in Oregon, # 213 overall and 19th ranked cornerback in the country. Scout.com ranked Molden the No. 151 overall recruit and No. 17 cornerback in the country. 247Sports.com listed him at No. 2 in Oregon and No. 23 in the nation at cornerback.

== College career ==
Although Molden's father was a standout at the University of Oregon, Elijah wanted to create his own legacy. He was heavily recruited by several universities, including Oregon, Notre Dame, USC, Stanford and Utah; but he eventually chose to play at the University of Washington under head coach Chris Petersen. He played in all 13 games during his true freshman season. In his sophomore season, Molden played in all 14 games and had two starts, including the Pac-12 title game. He won the school's award for Most Outstanding Special Teams Player.

Molden started all 13 games again in his junior season. He was named the MVP of the Las Vegas Bowl, after totaling nine tackles, a half tackle for loss, a forced fumble and an interception in the win over Boise State. He was recognized for his outstanding season, including, the CoSIDA Academic All-District 8 team, Pro Football Focus All-America second-team, first-team All-Pac-12, Pro Football Focus and Associated Press All-Pac-12 first-team, Phil Steele's All-Pac-12 first-team and All-America honorable mention, and the Pac-12 Academic Honor Roll.

His senior season was cut short by the COVID-19 pandemic. Molden started every game of the four-game season. Again, he was recognized at the conclusion of the season for his performance both on and off the field. He was named a second-team All-American by Pro Football Focus, which also named him Pac-12 Player of the Year. He earned first-team All-Pac-12 for the second season in a row and he was one of 12 finalists for the William V. Campbell Trophy. He was a semifinalist for the Lott IMPACT Trophy. Finally, he won the 113th annual Guy Flaherty Most Inspirational Award, and also the UW's Defensive MVP, at the team's postseason awards banquet.

On December 21, 2020, Molden announced that he would forgo his remaining eligibility and enter his name in the 2021 NFL draft.

== Professional career ==
=== Pre-draft ===
Bleacher Report, Marcus Mosher of USA Today Sports, and ESPN analyst Mel Kiper Jr. ranked Molden as the sixth best cornerback prospect in the draft. NFL draft analysts projected him to possibly be selected as early as the second round to as late as the fourth round. Scouts Inc. had Molden ranked as the seventh best cornerback (49th overall). Dane Brugler of The Athletic and NFL analyst Bucky Brooks ranked him as the fifth best cornerback prospect in the draft. NFL Network analyst Daniel Jeremiah ranked Molden second amongst all cornerbacks in the draft. Pro Football Focus had him as the second best cornerback in the 2021 NFL Draft.

Pre-draft measurables
Height	Weight	Arm length	Hand span	Wingspan	40-yard dash	Vertical jump	Broad jump	Bench press
5 ft 9 1/2 in (1.77 m)	192 lb (87 kg)	29 1/2 in (0.75 m)	9 1/2 in (0.24 m)	6 ft 0 1/2 in (1.84 m)	4.58 s	36.5 in (0.93 m)	10 ft 5 in (3.18 m)	13 reps
All values from Pro Day

=== Tennessee Titans ===
The Tennessee Titans selected Molden in the third round (100th overall) of the 2021 NFL Draft. He was the 13th cornerback drafted in 2021.

External videos
- Titans draft Elijah Molden No. 100 overall
- 2021 NFL Draft Prospects: Elijah Molden

==== 2021 ====
On July 22, 2021, the Tennessee Titans signed Molden to a four–year, $4.78 million rookie contract that includes an initial signing bonus of $840,620.

During training camp, Molden competed against Breon Borders, Chris Jackson, Greg Mabin, and Kevin Peterson to be a backup cornerback. Head coach Mike Vrabel listed Molden as the fifth cornerback on the depth chart as a backup cornerback to begin the season behind Janoris Jenkins, Kristian Fulton, Chris Jackson, and Breon Borders.

On September 12, 2021, Molden made his professional regular season debut during the Tennessee Titans' home-opener against the Arizona Cardinals and recorded two solo tackles as they lost 13–38. In Week 6, Molden earned his first career start in place of Kristian Fulton who was inactive due to a hamstring injury and made a season-high nine combined tackles (six solo) during a 34–31 victory against the Buffalo Bills. On October 31, 2021, Molden recorded two solo tackles, a season-high two pass deflections, and returned his first career interception on a pass by Carson Wentz for two–yards to score his first career touchdown during a 34–31 overtime victory at the Indianapolis Colts. On December 20, 2021, the Titans placed him on the COVID-19/reserve list and he subsequently was inactive for their 20–17 win against the San Francisco 49ers in Week 16. On December 27, 2021, he was removed from the COVID-19/reserve list and added back to the active roster. He finished his rookie season with a total of 62 combined tackles (43 solo), four pass deflections, one interception, a forced fumble, a fumble recovery, and one touchdown in 16 games and seven starts. He received an overall grade of 64.1 from Pro Football Focus as a rookie in 2021.

The Tennessee Titans finished the 2021 NFL season a top the AFC South with a 12–5 record and clinched a first-round bye. On January 22, 2022, Molden started in his first postseason game and made two solo tackles as the Titans lost 16–19 to the Cincinnati Bengals in the Divisional Round.

==== 2022 ====
Throughout training camp, Molden competed against rookie Roger McCreary, Chris Jackson, and Caleb Farley to be a starting cornerback under defensive coordinator Shane Bowen following the departure of Janoris Jenkins. Head coach Mike Vrabel named Molden a backup cornerback to begin the season and listed him as fourth on the depth chart, behind Kristian Fulton, Caleb Farley, and Roger McCreary.

On September 9, 2022, the Titans officially placed Molden on injured reserve due to a groin injury he sustained during training camp. On November 12, 2022, he was activated from injured reserve after missing the first eight games (Weeks 1–9) of the season. On November 13, 2022, Molden appeared in his first game of the season and recorded a season-high three combined tackles (two solo) during a 17–10 victory against the Denver Broncos. He was sidelined for the Titans' 27–17 win at the Green Bay Packers in Week 11 due to his groin injury. On December 7, 2022, the Titans placed him back on injured reserve where he remained inactive for the last six games (Weeks 13–18). He was limited to two games with one start and had five combined tackles (four solo).

==== 2023 ====
During training camp, Molden competed to be a starting cornerback against Kristian Fulton, Roger McCreary, and Sean Murphy-Bunting. Defensive coordinator Shane Bowen began playing Molden at safety. Head coach Mike Vrabel named Molden a backup cornerback and safety to begin the season.

On September 10, 2023, Molden made a season-high eight combined tackles (six solo) and broke up a pass during the Tennessee Titans' season-opening 15–16 loss at the New Orleans Saints. The following week, he earned his first career start at safety, starting in place of Amani Hooker who was still recovering from a concussion. He recorded five combined tackles (three solo) during a 27–24 overtime win against the Los Angeles Chargers. He injured his hamstring and was inactive for two games (Weeks 4/6). On December 17, 2023, Molden made three solo tackles, a season-high two pass deflections, and returned an interception thrown by Case Keenum to running back Dare Ogunbowale for a 44–yard touchdown during a 16–19 overtime loss to the Houston Texans. He finished the 2023 NFL season with 73 combined tackles (46 solo), four pass deflections, a fumble recovery, a forced fumble, one interception, and a touchdown in 15 games and eight starts. He received an overall grade of 55.9 from Pro Football Focus in 2023.

==== 2024 ====
He entered training camp listed at safety under new defensive coordinator Dennard Wilson. Throughout training camp, he competed against Amani Hooker, Quandre Diggs, and Jamal Adams to be a starting safety following the departure of Kevin Byard. On August 25, 2024, Molden exited during the third quarter of a 30–27 win at the New Orleans Saints after possibly suffering a concussion.

=== Los Angeles Chargers ===
==== 2024 ====
On August 28, 2024, Molden was traded to the Los Angeles Chargers for a 2026 seventh-round pick. Head coach Jim Harbaugh named him a backup safety to start the season, behind starting duo Derwin James and Alohi Gilman.

In Week 2, Molden earned his first start with the Chargers in place of Alohi Gilman and made seven combined tackles (five solo), one pass deflection, and intercepted a pass by Bryce Young to wide receiver Diontae Johnson during a 26–3 win at the Carolina Panthers. On November 3, 2024, he made six combined tackles (two solo), a season-high three pass deflections, and intercepted a pass thrown by Jameis Winston to Jerry Jeudy during a 27–10 victory at the Cleveland Browns. In Week 15, he collected a season-high nine combined tackles (six solo) as the Chargers lost 17–40 to the Tampa Bay Buccaneers. He was inactive the following week due to a knee injury as the Chargers defeated the Denver Broncos 34–27. On December 28, 2024, it was announced that Molden would miss the remainder of the season with a broken fibula. He finished the 2024 NFL season with 75 combined tackles (43 solo), seven pass deflections, a career-high three interceptions, and two fumble recoveries in 15 games and 12 starts. He received an overall grade of 75.6 from Pro Football Focus in 2024, which ranked 22nd among 171 qualifying cornerbacks.

==== 2025 ====
On February 20, 2025, the Los Angeles Chargers signed Molden to a three–year, $18.75 million contract extension that includes $13.50 million guaranteed and an initial signing bonus of $13.75 million. He underwent offseason surgery to repair a torn meniscus in his right knee.

== Career statistics ==
=== NFL ===
Legend
**Bold**	Career high

==== Regular season ====
Year	Team	Games		Tackles					Interceptions						Fumbles				
Year	Team	GP	GS	Cmb	Solo	Ast	Sck	TFL	Int	Yds	Avg	Lng	TD	PD	FF	Fum	FR	Yds	TD
2021	TEN	**16**	7	62	43	19	0.0	**3**	1	2	2.0	2	**1**	4	**1**	0	1	0	0
2022	TEN	2	1	5	4	1	0.0	1	0	0	0.0	0	0	0	0	0	0	0	0
2023	TEN	15	8	73	**47**	26	0.0	1	1	**44**	**44.0**	**44**	**1**	4	**1**	0	1	**1**	0
2024	LAC	15	**12**	**75**	43	**32**	0.0	2	**3**	28	9.3	25	0	**7**	0	0	**2**	0	0
2025	LAC	12	**12**	52	28	24	0.0	0	1	0	0.0	0	0	1	0	0	0	0	0
2026	LAC	3	3	17	10	7	0.0	1	0	0	0.0	0	0	0	0	0	0	0	0
Career		63	43	284	175	109	0.0	8	6	74	12.3	44	2	16	2	0	4	1	0

==== Postseason ====
Year	Team	Games		Tackles					Interceptions						Fumbles				
Year	Team	GP	GS	Cmb	Solo	Ast	Sck	TFL	Int	Yds	Avg	Lng	TD	PD	FF	Fum	FR	Yds	TD
2021	TEN	**1**	**1**	**2**	0	**2**	0.0	0	0	0	0.0	0	0	0	0	0	0	0	0
2025	LAC	**1**	0	**2**	0	**2**	0.0	0	0	0	0.0	0	0	0	0	0	0	0	0
Career		2	1	4	0	4	0.0	0	0	0	0.0	0	0	0	0	0	0	0	0

=== College ===
Year	Team	GP	Tackles				Interceptions						Fumbles	
Year	Team	GP	Total	Solo	Ast	Sck	PDef	Int	Yds	Avg	Lng	TDs	FF	FR
2017	Washington	13	19	10	9	0.0	1	0	0	0.0	0	0	0	0
2018	Washington	14	29	20	9	0.0	5	0	0	0.0	0	0	1	1
2019	Washington	13	79	49	30	0.0	17	4	45	11.3	31	0	3	1
2020	Washington	4	26	21	5	0.0	2	1	24	24.0	24	0	0	0
Total		44	153	100	53	0.0	25	5	69	13.8	31	0	4	2
Source: GoHuskies.com

== Personal life ==
Molden is the son of Alex and Christin Molden. He is the second oldest of eight children. His father is a member of the University of Oregon Hall of Fame and NFL cornerback.
