= Captain (sports) =

Leader of a sports team

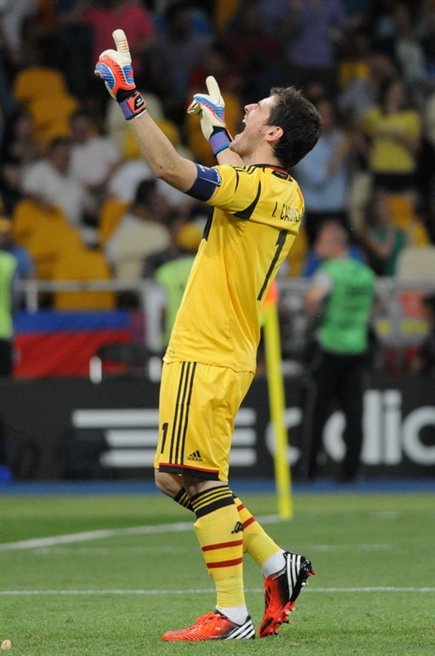
Iker Casillas, as captain of the Spain national football team, wearing a captaincy armband on his left arm

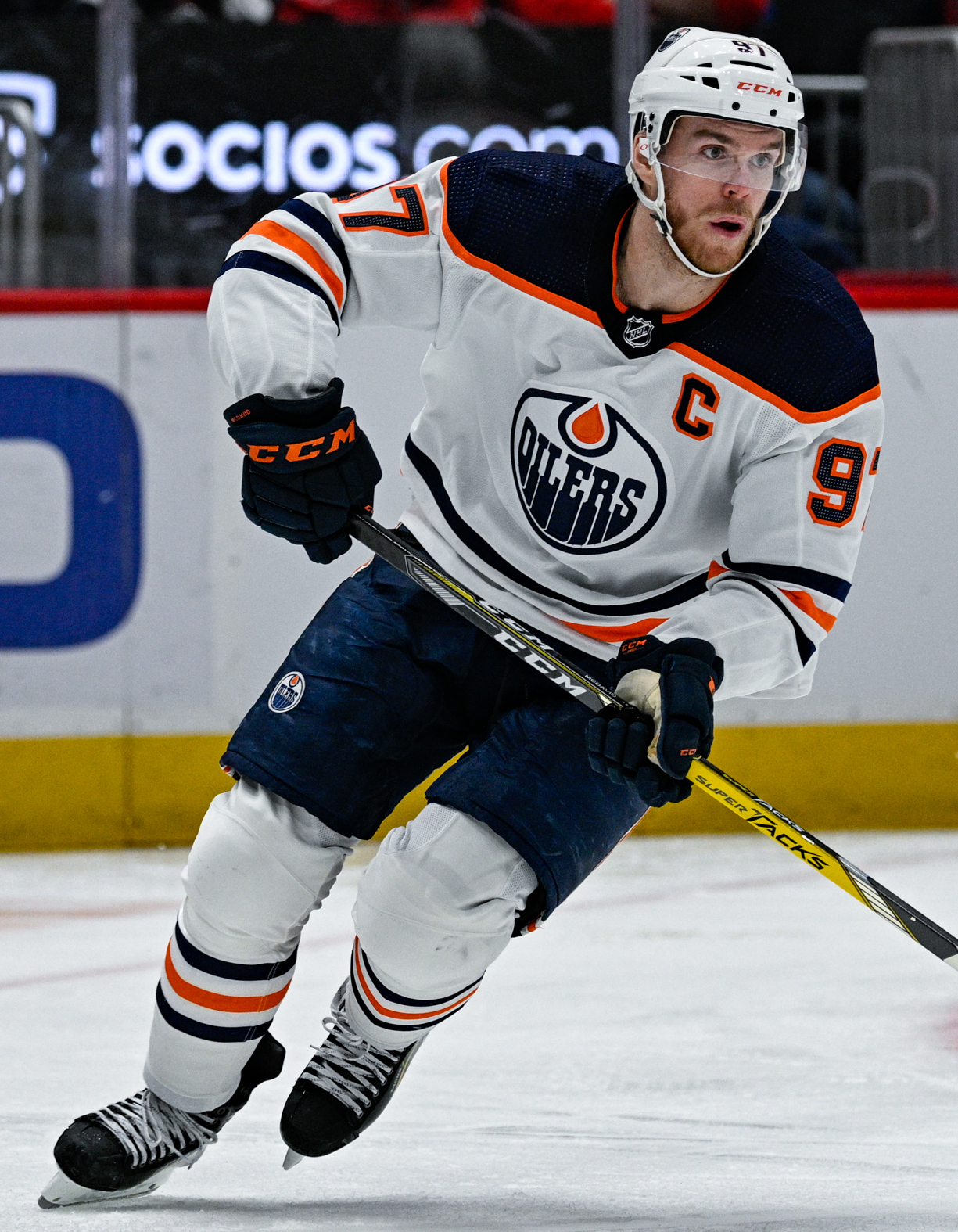
Connor McDavid, as captain of the Edmonton Oilers, wearing a captaincy patch on the chest of his jersey

In team sport, captain is a title given to a member of the team. The title is frequently honorary, but in some cases the captain may have significant responsibility for strategy and teamwork while the game is in progress on the field. In either case, it is a position that indicates honor and respect from one's teammates – recognition as a leader by one's peers. In association football and cricket, a captain is also known as a skipper.

Various sports have differing roles and responsibilities for team captains. Depending on the sport, team captains may be given the responsibility of interacting with game officials regarding application and interpretation of the rules. In many team sports, the captains represent their respective teams when the match official does the coin toss at the beginning of the game.

The team captain, in some sports, is selected by the team coach, who may consider factors ranging from playing ability to leadership to serving as a good moral example to the team. Coaches may also choose to change team captains from time to time, or to have a rotation of team captains.

Some of the greatest captains in history are the ones with the most subtle of traits that are required for success. From Sam Walker in his book The Captain Class he states that a captain is "the most important factor for a team's success".

== Responsibilities of a captain ==
The responsibilities of a captain vary from sport to sport, but overall help determine the game. In sports like cricket or volleyball, the decision for the two teams to be on either offence or defense is determined with a coin toss and a decision made by the captains. This decision is often strategically made depending on how the coin lands, since it can negatively or positively affect the outcome of a game depending on whether a given team starts on offence or defence.

A captain is also the first one a referee looks to while explaining the results of a play or giving a foul, or flag. Oftentimes a referee will not discuss these matters with any other player than a captain or a coach. This is important because the reaction of the captain may or may not determine how the referee will proceed. A captain must stay calm and cool headed when talking with a referee to ensure the most accurate determinants of the game.

Depending on the sport, a captain will have different responsibilities. In basketball the captain can be substituted out of the game and there does not need to be an active captain on the court at all times, but in association football a captain must be on the field at all times. Usually the "Captain Band" will be passed to a player with similar seniority to the team when the captain is substituted out of the game.

Although these responsibilities may vary from sport to sport, most responsibilities stay the same. When a team's performance is poor, one of the first individuals that fans, analysts, and other teams look at are the captains of that specific team.

== See also ==
=== Captains of specific sports ===
- Captain (association football)
- Captain (Australian rules football)
- Captain (baseball)
- Captain (cricket)
- Captain (field hockey)
- Captain (Gaelic games)
- Captain (gymnastics)
- Captain (handball)
- Captain (ice hockey)
- National Football League team captains
- Captain (rugby league)
- Captain (volleyball)
- Captain (water polo)
- Skip (curling)

=== Other links ===
- Manager (baseball)
- Player-coach
- Vice-captain
