= Dane Cruikshank =

American football player (born 1995)

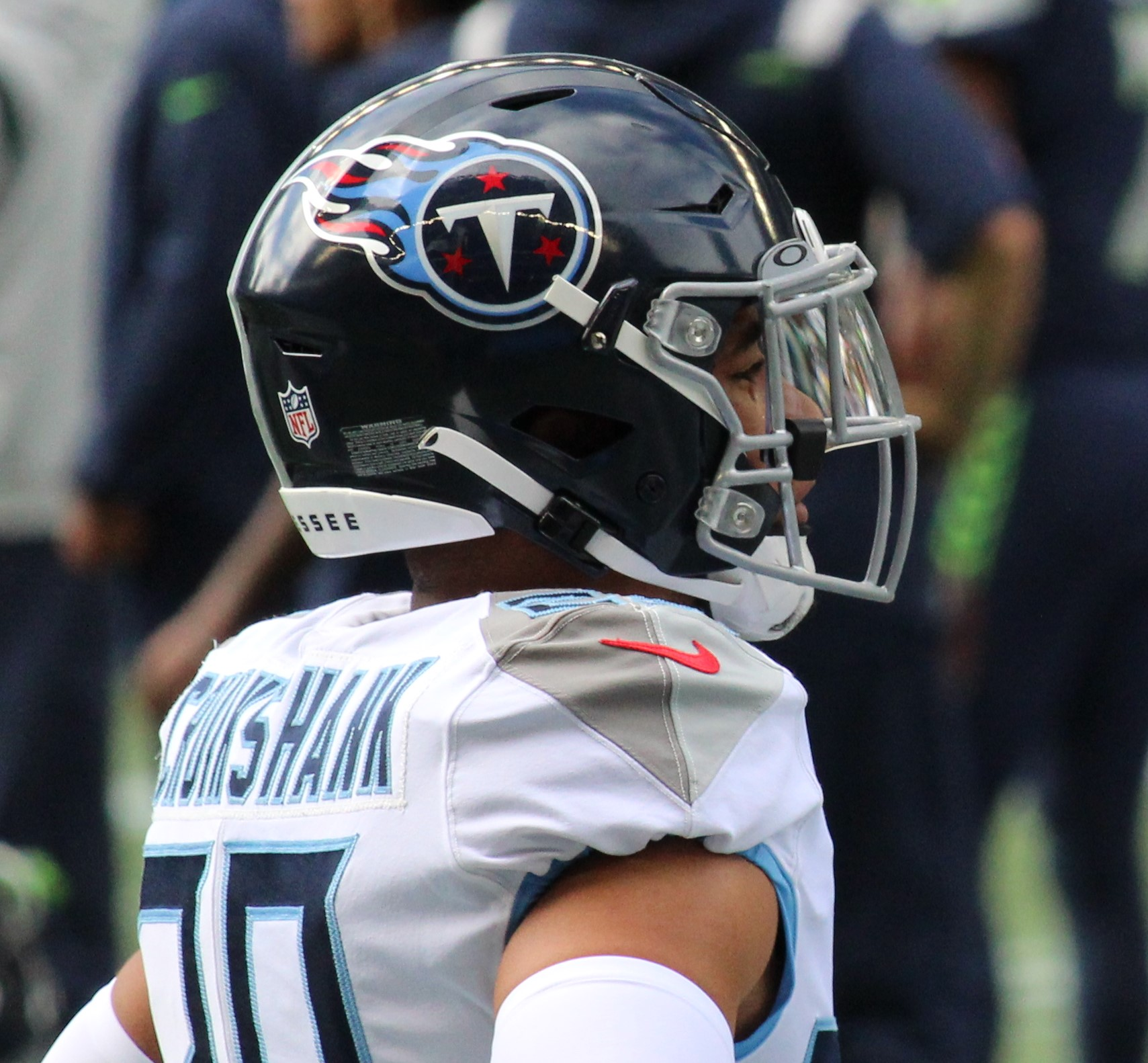
- Cruikshank with the Tennessee Titans in 2021

Profile
- Position: Safety

Personal information
- Born: April 27, 1995 (age 31); Chino Hills, California, U.S.
- Listed height: 6 ft 1 in (1.85 m)
- Listed weight: 210 lb (95 kg)

Career information
- High school: Ayala (Chino Hills, California)
- College: Citrus (2013–2014); Arizona (2015–2017)
- NFL draft: 2018: 5th round, 152nd overall pick

Career history
- Tennessee Titans (2018–2021); Chicago Bears (2022); New York Jets (2023)*; Tennessee Titans (2023)*; Atlanta Falcons (2024)*
- * Offseason or practice squad member only

Career NFL statistics as of 2024
- Total tackles: 66
- Forced fumbles: 1
- Interceptions: 1
- Pass deflections: 2
- Total touchdowns: 1
- Stats at Pro Football Reference

Dane Ashton Cruikshank (born April 27, 1995) is an American professional football safety. He played college football at Arizona. Cruikshank was selected by the Tennessee Titans in the fifth round of the 2018 NFL draft.

== College career ==
Cruikshank majored in general studies at Arizona after playing at Citrus College for the 2013 and 2014 seasons. He was named first-team all-state.

He redshirted the 2015 season at Arizona.

As a redshirt junior in 2016, he played cornerback, tying the team lead in interceptions with two, finishing fourth in total tackles with 60 and second in pass breakups with seven.

As a redshirt senior in 2017, he switched to safety, ranking fifth on the team with 75 total tackles, tying for second in interceptions with three and ranking third in pass breakups with five.

== Professional career ==
Pre-draft measurables
Height	Weight	Arm length	Hand span	40-yard dash	10-yard split	20-yard split	20-yard shuttle	Three-cone drill	Vertical jump	Broad jump	Bench press
6 ft 1 1/4 in (1.86 m)	209 lb (95 kg)	31 in (0.79 m)	8 3/4 in (0.22 m)	4.41 s	1.50 s	2.59 s	4.24 s	6.89 s	38.5 in (0.98 m)	10 ft 1 in (3.07 m)	25 reps
All values from NFL Combine

=== Tennessee Titans (first stint) ===
==== 2018 season ====
Cruikshank was selected by the Tennessee Titans in the fifth round (152nd overall) of the 2018 NFL draft. On May 11, 2018, he signed a four-year contract worth $2,747,892 with $287,892 in guarantees.

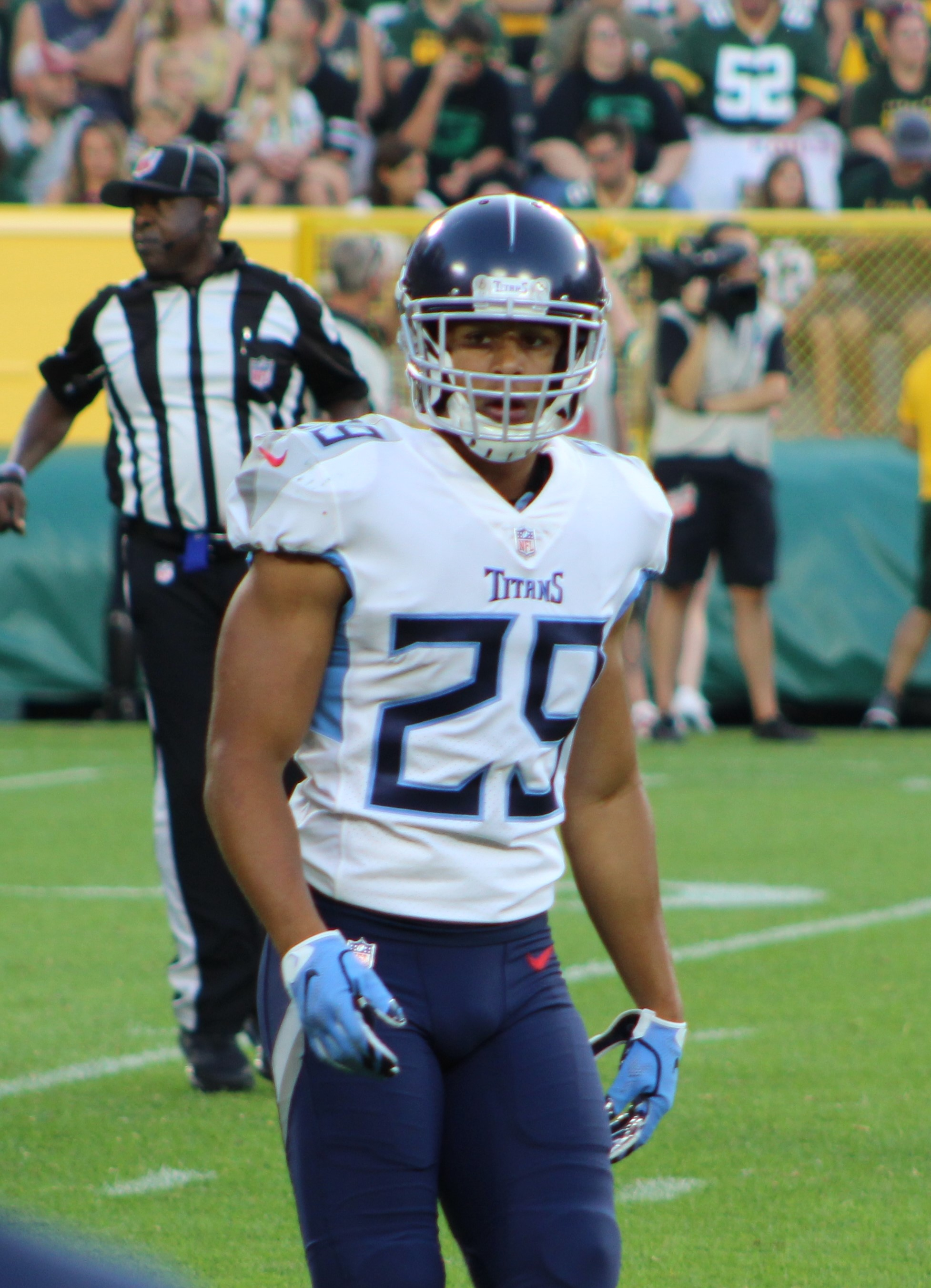
Cruikshank with the Tennessee Titans in 2018

On September 16, 2018, he scored his first NFL touchdown on a fake punt against the Houston Texans by hauling in a 66-yard reception from Kevin Byard. Cruikshank was named American Football Conference Special Teams Player of the Week for his performance in the 20–17 victory.

Cruikshank finished his rookie year with 11 tackles, 39 return yards, 66 receiving yards, and a touchdown.

==== 2019 season ====
On December 1, 2019, vs the Indianapolis Colts at Lucas Oil Stadium, Cruikshank blocked a fourth-quarter field goal attempt by Adam Vinatieri, which backup cornerback Tye Smith scooped up and took 63 yards for a go-ahead touchdown that sent Tennessee on its way to a 31–17 victory.

==== 2020 season ====
On September 6, 2020, Cruikshank was placed on injured reserve. He was activated on October 24, 2020. In week 7 against the Pittsburgh Steelers, Cruikshank recorded his first career interception off a pass thrown by Ben Roethlisberger during the 27–24 loss. He was placed back on injured reserve on November 11, ending his season.

==== 2021 season ====
Cruikshank was placed on injured reserve after missing a week of practice with a knee injury on November 13, 2021. He was activated on December 11.

=== Chicago Bears ===
On March 31, 2022, Cruikshank signed with the Chicago Bears. He was placed on injured reserve on November 30.

=== New York Jets ===
On July 20, 2023, Cruikshank signed with the New York Jets. He was released on August 25.

=== Tennessee Titans (second stint) ===
On September 25, 2023, Cruikshank signed with the practice squad of the Tennessee Titans. He was released on November 7.

=== Atlanta Falcons ===
On May 13, 2024, Cruikshank signed with the Atlanta Falcons. He was released on August 27, and re-signed to the practice squad. Cruikshank was released on October 1 and re-signed to the practice squad two weeks later. He was released again on December 9.
