= Kevin Byard =

American football player (born 1993)

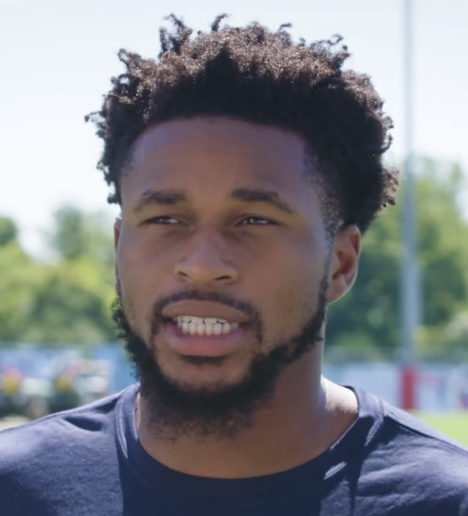
- Byard with the Tennessee Titans in 2021

No. 31 – New England Patriots
- Position: Safety
- Roster status: Active

Personal information
- Born: August 17, 1993 (age 33); Philadelphia, Pennsylvania, U.S.
- Listed height: 5 ft 11 in (1.80 m)
- Listed weight: 212 lb (96 kg)

Career information
- High school: Martin Luther King Jr. (Lithonia, Georgia)
- College: Middle Tennessee (2011–2015)
- NFL draft: 2016: 3rd round, 64th overall pick

Career history
- Tennessee Titans (2016–2023); Philadelphia Eagles (2023); Chicago Bears (2024–2025); New England Patriots (2026–present)

Awards and highlights
- 3× First-team All-Pro (2017, 2021, 2025); 3× Pro Bowl (2017, 2021, 2025); 2× NFL interceptions leader (2017, 2025); 2× First-team All-C-USA (2014, 2015); Second-team All-Sun Belt (2012); Middle Tennessee Blue Raiders No. 20 retired

Career NFL statistics as of Week 10, 2026
- Total tackles: 1,025
- Sacks: 6.0
- Forced fumbles: 4
- Fumble recoveries: 6
- Pass deflections: 86
- Interceptions: 38
- Defensive touchdowns: 2
- Stats at Pro Football Reference

Kevin Leon Byard III (born August 17, 1993) is an American professional football safety for the New England Patriots of the National Football League (NFL). He played college football for the Middle Tennessee Blue Raiders and was selected by the Tennessee Titans in the third round of the 2016 NFL draft. In 2017, his second season in the NFL, Byard was selected to the Pro Bowl and was named the first-team All-Pro after co-leading the NFL in interceptions and leading the NFL in takeaways with 10 (eight interceptions and two fumble recoveries). He was traded to the Philadelphia Eagles in 2023 before joining the Chicago Bears the following season. Byard led the NFL in interceptions again in 2025.

== Early life ==
Byard was born on August 17, 1993, in Philadelphia, Pennsylvania. After his parents divorced when he was 14, Byard moved to Atlanta, Georgia with his mother and siblings. Byard attended Martin Luther King Jr. High School in Lithonia, Georgia, where he participated in football and track.

== College career ==
Byard played for the Middle Tennessee State Blue Raiders of Middle Tennessee State University from 2012 to 2015. He was redshirted in 2011. Byard earned Honorable Mention All-Conference USA honors in 2013. In 2014 and 2015, he was named First-team All-Conference USA. Byard's 19 career interceptions are the most in school history. He graduated from Middle Tennessee in May 2015 with a degree in liberal studies.

== Professional career ==
=== Pre-draft ===
On November 22, 2015, Byard announced on Twitter that he had accepted his invitation to play in the 2016 Senior Bowl. During the week leading up to the Senior Bowl, Byard was impressive during practices as he displayed his ball-hawking and athletic ability. Byard met with representatives from the Atlanta Falcons during the week. He was not one of the 60 defensive backs invited to the NFL Combine. On March 31, 2016, Byard participated at Middle Tennessee's pro day, along with 18 other teammates, and was the top prospect participating with representatives and scouts from 24 NFL teams attending. He surprised many scouts and analysts with a 4.46 and 4.50 in the 40-yard dash as many scouting reports listed speed as one of his weaknesses. Byard met with representatives from the Oakland Raiders, Detroit Lions, and Tennessee Titans during his pro day. He had official private visits or workouts with 12 NFL teams, including the Miami Dolphins, Green Bay Packers, Cleveland Browns, Titans, and Los Angeles Rams. At the conclusion of the pre-draft process, Byard received many mixed draft projections from draft experts and scouts, with some (DraftScout.com) projecting him to be a third or fourth-round pick to others (NFL.com) projecting him to be drafted in the sixth or seventh round. Byard was ranked the fifth best strong safety prospect in the draft by DraftScout.com.

Pre-draft measurables
Height	Weight	Arm length	Hand span	Wingspan	40-yard dash	10-yard split	20-yard split	20-yard shuttle	Three-cone drill	Vertical jump	Broad jump	Bench press
5 ft 11 1/4 in (1.81 m)	212 lb (96 kg)	33 1/2 in (0.85 m)	9 7/8 in (0.25 m)	6 ft 5 3/8 in (1.97 m)	4.46 s	1.61 s	2.64 s	4.15 s	6.73 s	38.0 in (0.97 m)	9 ft 0 in (2.74 m)	22 reps
All values from Middle Tennessee State's Pro Day

=== Tennessee Titans ===
External videos
- Titans select Kevin Byard No. 64 overall

The Tennessee Titans selected Byard in the third round (64th overall) of the 2016 NFL draft. He was the 24th player ever drafted from Middle Tennessee State and the highest player drafted from there since Tyrone Calico (second round, 60th overall) in 2003, who was also drafted by the Titans. Byard was the fifth safety selected in the draft.

==== 2016 ====
On July 18, 2016, the Titans signed Byard to a four-year, $3.63 million rookie contract with an initial signing bonus of $897,060.

Byard entered training camp as a candidate to earn a starting safety role following the departure of Michael Griffin, but had to compete against veterans Rashad Johnson and Da'Norris Searcy under defensive coordinator Dick LeBeau. During training camp, Daimion Stafford began taking over first-team reps from Byard and Searcy. Head coach Mike Mularkey named him a backup to begin the season, behind starting safeties Rashad Johnson and Da'Norris Searcy and primary backup Daimion Stafford.

Byard made his professional regular season debut in the season-opening 25–16 loss to the Minnesota Vikings and made five solo tackles. During Week 9 against the San Diego Chargers, Byard collected a season-high 10 combined tackles (five solo) and a pass deflection in the 43–35 road loss. His playing time increased after Rashad Johnson suffered a neck injury and was subsequently inactive for two games (Weeks 8–9). After performing well, he supplanted Johnson as the starting free safety. Byard earned his first career start in Week 10 against the Green Bay Packers and finished the 47–25 victory with seven solo tackles and made his first career sack on Aaron Rodgers for an eight-yard loss. Although Johnson returned from injury in Week 10, Byard remained the starting free safety for the last seven games of the season.

Byard finished his rookie year with 58 combined tackles (44 solo), a sack, and four pass deflections in 16 games and seven starts. He also finished second on the team with 10 special teams tackles. Byard received an overall grade of 62.5 from Pro Football Focus as a rookie in 2016.

==== 2017 ====
Byard entered training camp slated as the de facto free safety after they opted not to re-sign Rashad Johnson. Head coach Mike Mularkey named Byard the starting free safety to begin the regular season.

During the season-opening 26–16 loss to the Oakland Raiders, Byard recorded a team-high eight combined tackles (tied with Wesley Woodyard). In the next game against the Jacksonville Jaguars, he had six combined tackles (three solo) and a pass deflection during the 37–16 road victory. The following week against the Seattle Seahawks, Byard once again recorded six combined tackles (two solo) and a pass deflection in the 33–27 victory.

During Week 4 against the Houston Texans, Byard recorded a season-high nine combined tackles (four solo), two pass deflections, and made his first career interception from a pass thrown by Deshaun Watson to wide receiver DeAndre Hopkins in the 57–14 road loss. In the next game against the Miami Dolphins, Byard had five combined tackles (four solo) and a fumble recovery during the 16–10 road loss. Two weeks later against the Cleveland Browns, he recorded four combined tackles (two solo), three pass deflections, and a career-high three interceptions off passes by DeShone Kizer and Cody Kessler in the 12–9 overtime road victory. Byard was named AFC Defensive Player of the Week for his performance.

Following a Week 8 bye, the Titans returned home to face the Baltimore Ravens. Byard finished the 23–20 victory with four solo tackles, three pass deflections, and two interceptions off passes by Joe Flacco. Byard became the fifth player in NFL history to record five interceptions in a two-game span joining DeAngelo Hall (2010), Albert Lewis (1985), Willie Buchanon (1978), and Mike Haynes (1976). In the next game against the Cincinnati Bengals, he recorded six combined tackles (four solo) and two pass deflections during the 24–20 victory.

During a Week 12 20–16 road victory over the Indianapolis Colts, Byard recorded five combined tackles (three solo) and a fumble recovery. Byard received a grade of 89.9 from Pro Football Focus which was the third highest grade among safeties through the first 12 games, only behind Harrison Smith (94.2) and Adrian Amos (92.3). In the next game against the Texans, he tied his season high of nine combined tackles (six solo) and also deflected a pass during the 24–13 victory. During the regular season finale against the Jaguars, Byard recorded six combined tackles (four solo), two pass deflections, and had two interceptions on passes thrown by Blake Bortles in the 15–10 victory. Byard earned his second AFC Defensive Player of the Week award of the season for his performance.

Byard finished his second professional season with 87 combined tackles (62 solo), 16 pass deflections, two fumble recoveries, and a league-leading eight interceptions in 16 games and starts. Byard was named first-team All-Pro. Pro Football Focus had him finish the season with an overall grade of 87.0 in 2017. The Titans finished second in the AFC South with a 9–7 record and qualified for the playoffs as the #5-seed. During the Wild Card Round against the Kansas City Chiefs, Byard started in his first NFL playoff game and recorded five solo tackles in the 22–21 comeback road victory. In the Divisional Round against New England Patriots, Byard had 10 combined tackles (nine solo) during the 35–14 road loss. On January 21, 2018, Byard earned his first career Pro Bowl selection to appear in the 2018 Pro Bowl as an injury replacement after Bills' safety Micah Hyde bowed out due to a concussion. Byard was also ranked 80th by his fellow players on the NFL Top 100 Players of 2018.

==== 2018 ====
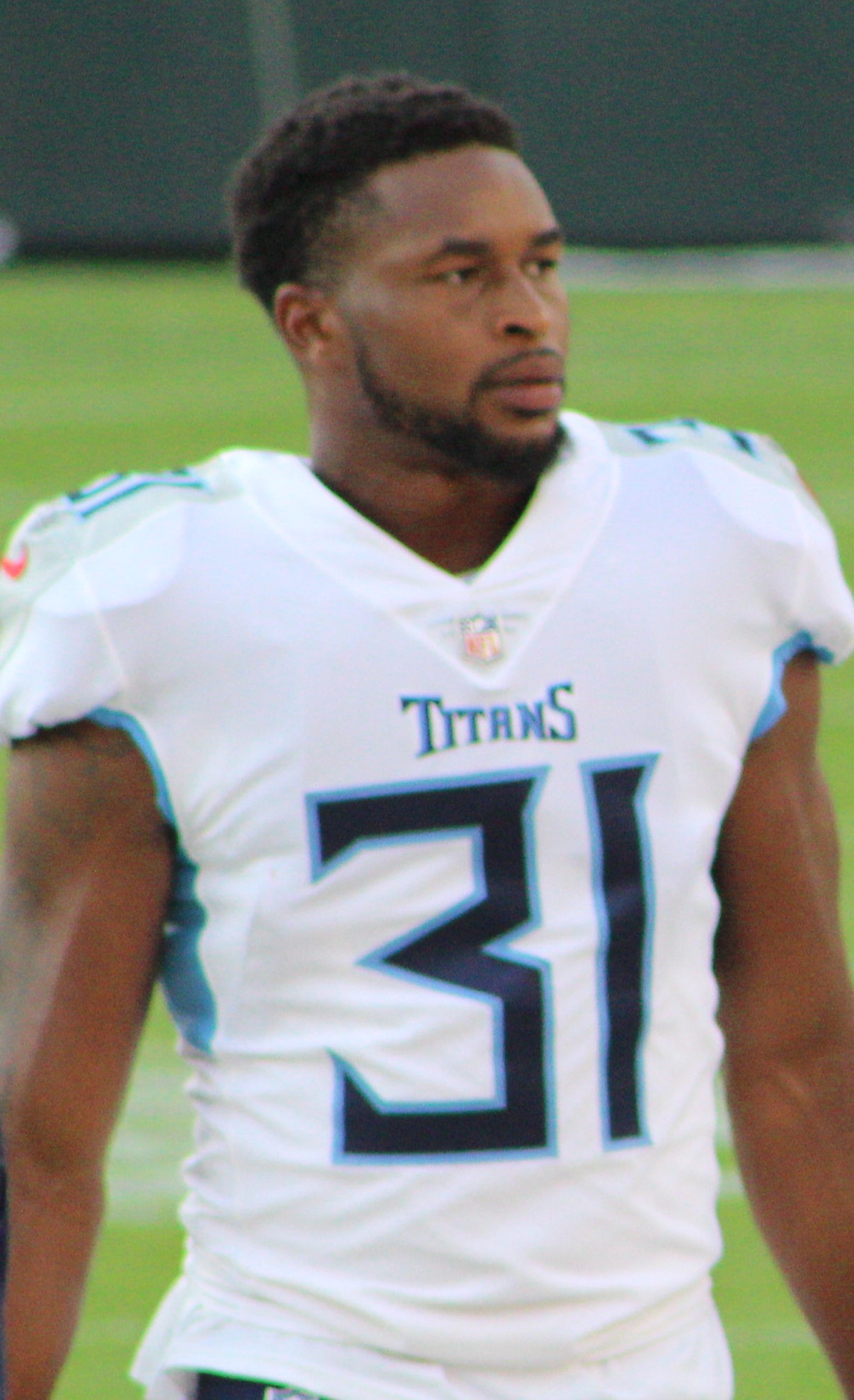
Byard in 2018

On January 20, 2018, the Titans hired former Houston Texans defensive coordinator Mike Vrabel to be their new head coach following the departure of Mike Mularkey. New defensive coordinator Dean Pees opted to retain Byard as a starting safety, and Vrabel named Byard the starting strong safety to begin the season and paired him with free safety Kenny Vaccaro.

During the season-opening 27–20 road loss to the Dolphins, Byard had three solo tackles and a pass deflection. In the next game against the Texans, he recorded a team-high eight combined tackles (seven solo) and threw a 66-yard touchdown to rookie cornerback Dane Cruikshank on a fake punt on the Titans' opening drive during the first quarter of the 20–17 victory. Two weeks later against the Philadelphia Eagles, Byard had a season-high 11 combined tackles (nine solo) in the 26–20 overtime victory.

During Week 6 against the Ravens, Byard recorded five combined tackles (four solo), a pass deflection, and his first interception of the season off of Joe Flacco in the 21–0 shutout loss. Three weeks later against the Dallas Cowboys on Monday Night Football, he had five combined tackles (three solo), a pass deflection, and intercepted a pass by Dak Prescott to wide receiver Amari Cooper in the endzone during the 28–14 road victory. After the pick, Byard celebrated on the Dallas Cowboys' star logo at midfield. The celebration was widely publicized as it resembled Terrell Owens' infamous celebration from the early 2000s. This caused Owens to tweet "I feel like I've seen this before" after the celebration occurred. Byard was fined $10,026 for the celebration. In the next game against the Patriots, he recorded four combined tackles (three solo) and a pass deflection during the 34–10 victory.

During a Week 11 38–10 road loss to the Colts, Byard had a team-high nine combined tackles (tied with Adoree' Jackson). Three weeks later against the Jaguars on Thursday Night Football, he recorded three combined tackles (two solo) and his first sack of the season on Cody Kessler in the 30–9 victory. In the next game against the New York Giants, Byard had five combined tackles (four solo), two pass deflections, set a career-high with his second sack of the season, and intercepted a pass by Eli Manning to wide receiver Russell Shepard during the 17–0 shutout road victory.

During Week 16 against the Washington Redskins, Byard recorded nine combined tackles (six solo), tied his season-high of two pass deflections, and secured the 25–16 comeback victory by intercepting a pass attempt by Josh Johnson to wide receiver Josh Doctson near the end of the fourth quarter. In the regular-season finale against the Colts on Sunday Night Football, Byard had 10 combined tackles (six solo) during the 33–17 loss.

Byard finished the 2018 season with 90 combined tackles (62 solo), a career-high two sacks, eight pass deflections, and four interceptions in 16 games and starts. His overall grade from Pro Football Focus was 88.4 in 2018.

==== 2019 ====
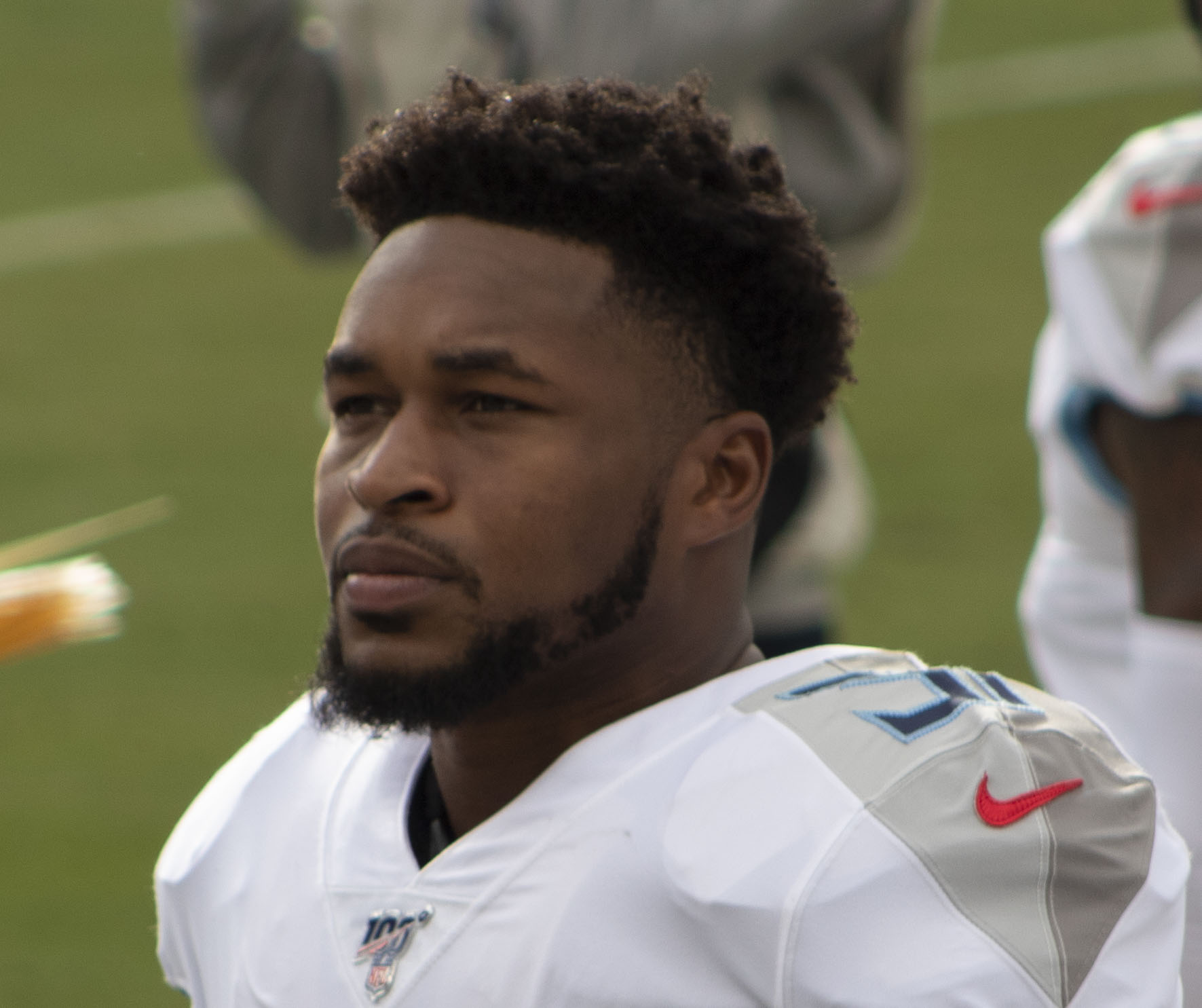
Byard in 2019

On July 24, 2019, the Titans signed Byard to a five-year, $70.5 million contract extension with $31 million guaranteed, $25.22 million guaranteed upon signing, and an initial signing bonus of $9 million, making him the highest-paid safety in NFL history. He entered training camp slated as the de facto starting free safety. Head coach Mike Vrabel named Byard the starting free safety to start the season and paired him with Kenny Vaccaro.

During the season-opening 43–13 road victory over the Browns, Byard had two solo tackles, a pass deflection, and his first interception of the season off of Baker Mayfield. Three weeks later against the Atlanta Falcons, Byard recorded seven tackles and a pass deflection in the 24–10 road victory.

During Week 5 against the Buffalo Bills, Byard recorded five combined tackles (four solo), a season-high two pass deflections, and intercepted a pass by Josh Allen to wide receiver Cole Beasley in the 14–7 loss. In the next game against the Denver Broncos, Byard had a season-high six solo tackles, a pass deflection, and an interception off a pass by Joe Flacco that had ricochet off tight end Noah Fant's back during the 16–0 shutout road loss. The following week against the Los Angeles Chargers, Byard recorded six combined tackles (five solo) and a pass deflection in the 23–20 victory.

During a Week 9 30–20 road loss to the Carolina Panthers, Byard had four combined tackles (two solo) and a pass deflection. Three weeks later against the Jaguars, he recorded a season-high nine combined tackles (four solo) in the 42–20 victory. In the next game against the Colts, Byard had two solo tackles, a pass deflection, and an interception off of Jacoby Brissett during the 31–17 road victory. During the regular-season finale against the Texans, Byard recorded seven combined tackles (six solo) and a pass deflection while securing the 35–14 road victory with a late fourth quarter interception off a pass by A. J. McCarron to tight end Jordan Akins.

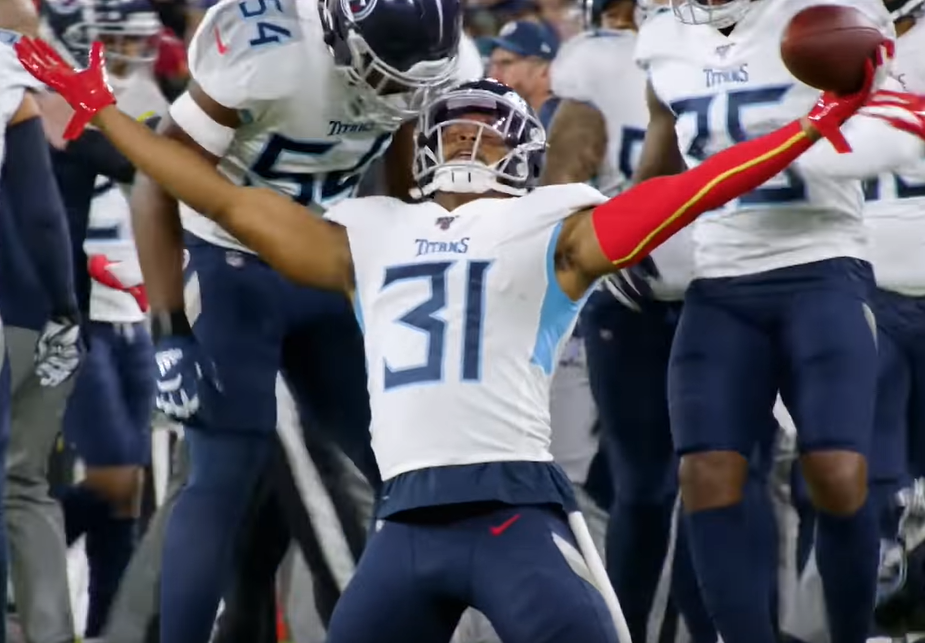
Byard after intercepting a pass thrown by Lamar Jackson in the AFC Divisional Round of the playoffs

Byard finished the 2019 season with 84 combined tackles (60 solo), five interceptions, and nine pass deflections in 16 games and starts. He finished with an overall grade of 79.4 from Pro Football Focus in 2019. The Titans finished second in the AFC South with a 9–7 record and qualified for the playoffs as the #6-seed. During the Wild Card Round against the Patriots, Byard recorded six combined tackles (five solo) in the 20–13 road victory. In the Divisional Round against the Ravens, he had 11 combined tackles (seven solo), a pass deflection, and intercepted a pass on the Ravens' opening drive that was thrown by Lamar Jackson to tight end Mark Andrews during the 28–12 road victory. During the AFC Championship Game against the Chiefs, Byard recorded four combined tackles (three solo) in the 35–24 road loss.

==== 2020 ====
Head coach Mike Vrabel took over duties as the defensive coordinator following the retirement of Dean Pees. Byard returned as the starting free safety and remained alongside strong safety Kenny Vaccaro.

During the narrow season-opening 16–14 road victory over the Broncos on Monday Night Football, Byard had a team-high nine combined tackles (eight solo), a pass deflection, and a forced fumble. Two weeks later against the Vikings, he recorded four combined tackles and a pass deflection in the narrow 31–30 road victory.

Following a Week 4 bye, the Titans faced the Bills on Tuesday Night Football. Byard finished the 42–16 victory with two solo tackles and a pass deflection. Three weeks later against the Bengals, he had seven combined tackles (four solo) and a pass deflection during the 31–20 road loss.

During a Week 10 34–17 loss to the Colts on Thursday Night Football, Byard had a team-high 10 combined tackles (six solo). In the next game against the Ravens, he recorded seven combined tackles (five solo) and a pass deflection during the 30–24 overtime road victory. Three weeks later against the Jaguars, Byard had a season-high 11 combined tackles (eight solo) in the 31–10 road victory.

During Week 15 against the Detroit Lions, Byard tied his season-high of 11 combined tackles (six solo), set a season-high with two pass deflections, and recorded his lone interception of the season on a pass by Chase Daniel in the 46–25 road victory. In the next game against the Packers on Sunday Night Football, Byard had a team-high nine combined tackles (tied with David Long Jr.) during the 40–14 road loss.

Byard finished the 2020 season with a team-leading 111 combined tackles (79 solo), seven pass deflections, an interception, and a forced fumble in 16 games and starts. Pro Football Focus had him finish the season with an overall grade of 65.8. The Titans finished atop the AFC South with an 11–5 record and qualified for the playoffs. During the Wild Card Round against the Ravens, Byard recorded five combined tackles (two solo) and a pass deflection in the 20–13 loss.

==== 2021 ====
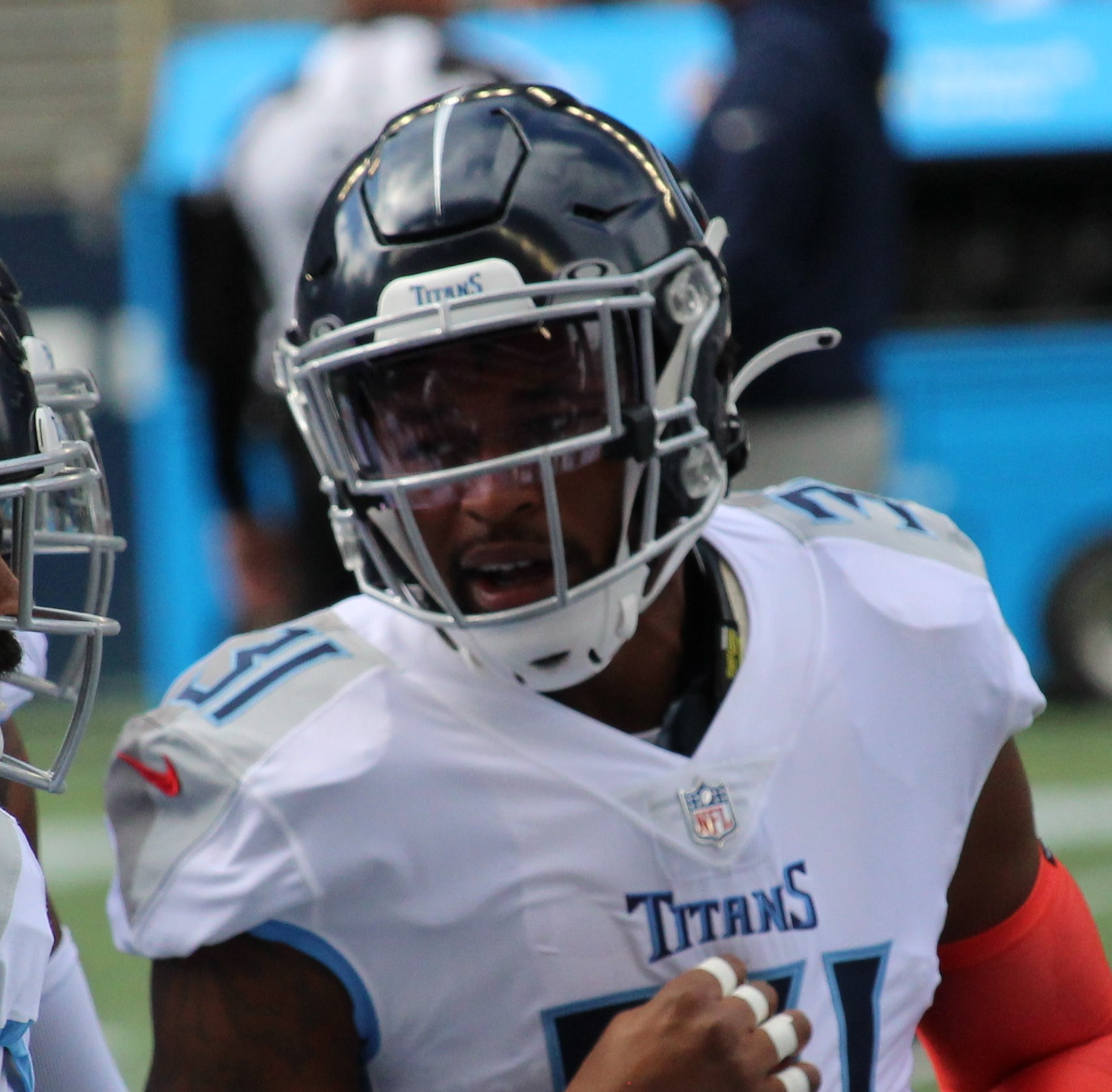
Byard in 2021

On January 29, 2021, outside linebackers coach Shane Bowen was promoted to defensive coordinator. Bowen retained Byard as the starting free safety to enter the regular season and paired him with Amani Hooker following the departure of Kenny Vaccaro.

During the season-opening 38–13 loss to the Arizona Cardinals, Byard recorded two solo tackles, a pass deflection, and his first interception of the season off of Kyler Murray. Two weeks later against the Colts, Byard had five combined tackles (four solo) and two pass deflections in the 28–16 victory. In the next game against the New York Jets, he recorded six combined tackles (three solo) and a pass deflection during the 27–24 overtime road loss.

During Week 5 against the Jaguars, Byard had 11 combined tackles (eight solo), two pass deflections, and interception, and scored his first NFL touchdown after recovering a fumble that teammate Elijah Molden forced by tight end Dan Arnold and returned it for a 30-yard touchdown on the opening drive of the 37–19 road victory. In the next game against the Bills on Monday Night Football, Byard recorded two combined tackles (one solo), a pass deflection, and an interception during the 34–31 victory. The following week against the Chiefs, he had four solo tackles and a forced fumble in the 27–3 blowout victory.

During a Week 8 34–31 overtime road victory over the Colts, Byard had four solo tackles, a season-high three pass deflections, and secured the victory after intercepting a pass by Carson Wentz to wide receiver Michael Pittman in overtime, leading to Randy Bullock's 44-yard game-winning field goal. Byard was later named AFC Defensive Player of the Month for October after recording 27 tackles, seven pass deflections, three interceptions, a forced fumble, and a touchdown on a fumble recovery. In the next game against the Los Angeles Rams on Sunday Night Football, he had three tackles, a pass deflection, and his first career pick-six after intercepting a pass thrown by Matthew Stafford to wide receiver Robert Woods during the 28–16 road victory. The following week against the New Orleans Saints, Byard recorded five combined tackles (two solo) and a pass deflection in the narrow 23–21 victory.

During Week 12 against the Patriots, Byard recorded a season-high 12 combined tackles (nine solo) and his first sack of the season on Mac Jones in the 36–13 road loss. Following a Week 13 bye, the Titans returned home to face the Jaguars. Byard finished the 20–0 shutout victory with five combined tackles (two solo) and a pass deflection. Two weeks later against the San Francisco 49ers on Thursday Night Football, he had six combined tackles (four solo) and a forced fumble in the 20–17 victory.

Byard finished the 2021 season with 88 combined tackles (57 solo), 13 pass deflections, five interceptions, two forced fumbles, a sack, and a career-high two touchdowns in 17 games and starts. He was named to his second Pro Bowl and earned first team All-Pro honors. Byard set a career-high with an overall grade of 90.6 from Pro Football Focus in 2021. The Titans finished atop the AFC South with a 12–5 record and qualified for the playoffs as the #1-seed. In the Divisional Round against the Bengals, Byard had three solo tackles during the 19–16 loss. He was ranked 34th by his fellow players on the NFL Top 100 Players of 2022.

==== 2022 ====
Byard entered training camp slated as the de facto starting free safety alongside Amani Hooker. Head coach Mike Vrabel officially named Byard and Hooker the starting safeties to begin the season.

During the season-opener against the New York Giants, Byard had a season-high 12 combined tackles (eight solo) in the narrow 21–20 loss. Two weeks later against the Las Vegas Raiders, he recorded four combined tackles (one solo), a pass deflection, and an interception off of Derek Carr in the narrow 24–22 victory.

During a Week 9 20–17 loss to the Chiefs on Sunday Night Football, Byard tied his season-high of 12 combined tackles (six solo). During Week 13 against the Eagles, Byard had a team-high seven combined tackles (tied with Tre Avery and Monty Rice) in the 35–10 road loss. In the next game against the Jaguars, he recorded three solo tackles and two pass deflections during the 36–22 loss.

During Week 15 against the Chargers, Byard recorded five combined tackles (three solo), a pass deflection, and an interception off of Justin Herbert in the 17–14 road loss. In the next game against the Texans, Byard had a team-high nine combined tackles (tied with Monty Rice) during the 19–14 loss. The following week against the Cowboys on Thursday Night Football, he recorded six combined tackles (four solo), a season-high two pass deflections, and set a season-high with two interceptions on passes thrown by Dak Prescott in the 27–13 loss.

Byard finished the 2022 season with 108 combined tackles (69 solo), four interceptions, and six pass deflections in 17 games and starts. He led the Titans interceptions and total tackles. Byard received an overall grade of 79.5 from Pro Football Focus in 2022.

==== 2023 ====
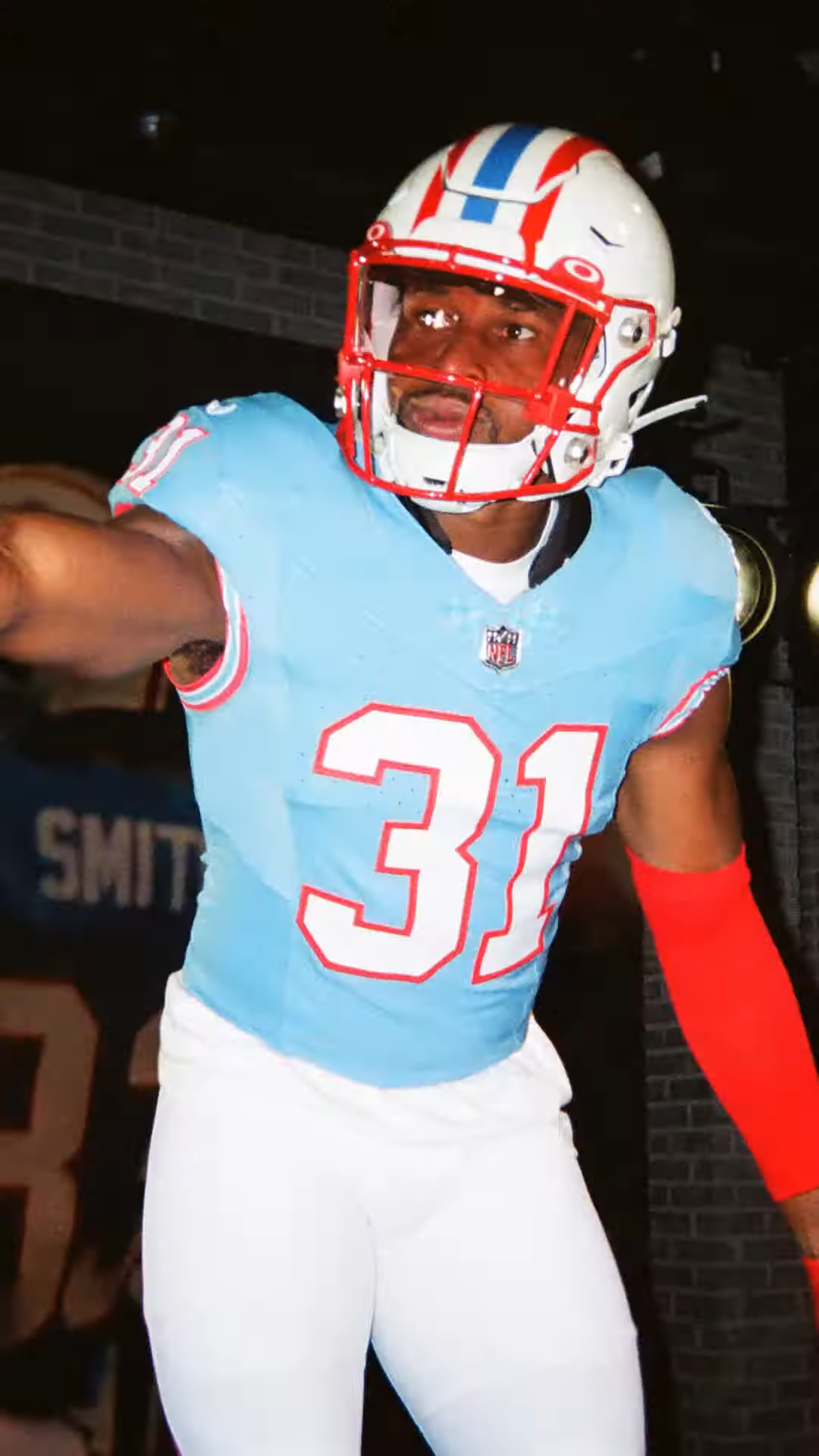
Byard in 2023

On July 21, 2023, the Titans and Byard agreed to restructure the remaining two years of his contract, with Byard signing a new two-year, $25.1 million contract that included a signing bonus of $7 million. He entered training camp slated as the de facto starting free safety. Head coach Mike Vrabel retained Byard and Amani Hooker as the starting safety tandem to begin the regular season.

During the season-opener against the Saints, Byard had a team-high eight combined tackles (tied with Elijah Molden) in the narrow 16–15 road loss. In the next game against the Chargers, he recorded a team-high 12 combined tackles (seven solo) during the 27–24 overtime victory. Two weeks later against the Bengals, Byard had six solo tackles and a fumble recovery in the 27–3 victory. During a Week 6 24–16 loss to the Ravens in London, he had 10 combined tackles (eight solo).

=== Philadelphia Eagles ===
On October 23, 2023, Byard was traded to the Philadelphia Eagles in exchange for a fifth-round pick (146th overall) and a sixth-round pick (182nd overall) in the 2024 NFL draft along with safety Terrell Edmunds. The Eagles acquired Byard as a replacement for Justin Evans, after he was placed on injured reserve due to a knee injury. Upon his arrival, head coach Nick Sirianni named Byard a starting strong safety and paired him with starting free safety Reed Blankenship.

Byard made his Eagles debut in Week 9 against the Washington Commanders and finished the 38–31 road victory with seven combined tackles (four solo). Three weeks later against the Chiefs on Monday Night Football, Byard recorded eight solo tackles, set a season-high with two pass deflections, and had his first interception of the season after picking off a pass thrown by Patrick Mahomes in the end zone to wide receiver Justin Watson during the 21–17 road victory. In the next game against the Bills, Byard had a season-high 13 combined tackles (eight solo) during the 37–34 overtime victory.

During Week 14 against the Cowboys on Sunday Night Football, Byard recorded five combined tackles (three solo) and a pass deflection in the 33–13 road loss. Three weeks later against the Cardinals, he had 11 combined tackles (eight solo) in the 35–31 loss.

In 16 games and starts on the Titans and Eagles rosters during the 2023 season, Byard accumulated 122 tackles (80 solo), three pass deflections, a fumble recovery, and an interception. He received an overall grade of 74.0 from Pro Football Focus in 2023. The Eagles finished second in the NFC East with an 11–6 record and qualified for the playoffs as the #5-seed. During the Wild Card Round against the Tampa Bay Buccaneers, Byard recorded five solo tackles in the 32–9 road loss.

On March 1, 2024, Byard was released by the Eagles.

=== Chicago Bears ===
==== 2024 ====
On March 10, 2024, the Chicago Bears signed Byard to a two-year, $15 million contract that included $7.39 million guaranteed upon signing and an initial signing bonus of $3 million.

Byard entered training camp projected to be a starter under defensive coordinator Eric Washington, following the departure of long-time starting free safety Eddie Jackson. Head coach Matt Eberflus named him the starting free safety to begin the season and paired him with strong safety Jaquan Brisker.

Byard made his Bears debut in the season-opener against his former team, the Tennessee Titans, and finished the 24–17 comeback victory with two combined tackles (one solo). In the next game against the Texans on Sunday Night Football, Byard had a team-high 11 combined tackles (tied with Tremaine Edmunds) and a fumble recovery during the 19–13 road loss. The following week against the Colts, he recorded six combined tackles (four solo) and a pass deflection in the 21–16 road loss.

During a Week 5 36–10 victory over the Panthers, Byard had six combined tackles (five solo), a pass deflection, and his only interception of the season on a pass thrown by Andy Dalton to wide receiver Jonathan Mingo. In the next game against the Jaguars in London, Byard recorded seven combined tackles (four solo) and a pass deflection during the 35–16 victory. Three weeks later against the Cardinals, he had seven combined tackles (three solo), a fumble recovery, and his first sack of the season on Kyler Murray in the 29–9 road loss.

During Week 10 against the Patriots, Byard recorded 11 combined tackles (five solo) in the 19–3 loss. In the next game against the Packers, he had a team-high nine combined tackles (four solo) during the narrow 20–19 loss. The following week against the Vikings, Byard recorded a team-high 13 combined tackles (11 solo) in the 30–27 overtime loss.

During a Week 13 23–20 road loss to the Lions on Thanksgiving, Byard had a team-high 10 combined tackles (five solo). The next day, the Bears fired head coach Matt Eberflus after falling to a 4–8 record, and offensive coordinator Thomas Brown was appointed to interim head coach for the rest of the season. In the next game against the 49ers, Byard recorded five combined tackles (three solo) and a pass deflection during the 38–13 road loss. The following week against the Vikings on Monday Night Football, he had six combined tackles (four solo) and a pass deflection in the 30–12 road loss. During the regular-season finale against the Packers, Byard recorded a season-high 14 combined tackles (nine solo) and strip-sacked Malik Willis in the narrow 24–22 road victory.

Byard finished the 2024 season with a career-high 130 combined tackles (80 solo), seven pass deflections, a career-high two sacks, two fumble recoveries, a forced fumble, and an interception in 17 games and starts. He received an overall grade of 72.8 from Pro Football Focus, which ranked 32nd among 121 qualifying safeties in 2024.

==== 2025 ====
During Week 3 against the Cowboys, Byard had seven combined tackles (five solo), a pass deflection, and sealed the 31–14 victory after intercepting Joe Milton with less than a minute remaining. In the next game against the Raiders, Byard once again recorded seven combined tackles (five solo) to go along with two pass deflections and two interceptions off of Geno Smith during the narrow 25–24 road victory. Three weeks later against the Saints, Byard had two combined tackles (one solo), two pass deflections, and an interception in the 26–14 victory.

During a narrow Week 11 19–17 road victory over the Vikings, Byard recorded five combined tackles (three solo), a pass deflection, and an interception. Two weeks later against his former team, the Eagles, Byard had a team-high six combined tackles (tied with Jaquan Brisker), a pass deflection, and an interception in the 24–15 road victory. During Week 15 against the Packers, he recorded a season-high nine combined tackles (five solo) in the 22–16 overtime victory. In the regular season finale against the Lions, Byard had a team-high eight combined tackles (tied with Brisker and Tremaine Edmunds), a pass deflection, and an interception off of Jared Goff during the 19–16 loss.

Byard finished the 2025 season with 93 combined tackles (61 solo), eight pass deflections, and a league-leading seven interceptions in 17 games and starts. He was named to his third Pro Bowl and first team All-Pro. The Bears finished atop the NFC North with an 11–6 record and qualified for the playoffs as the #2-seed. During the Wild Card Round against the Packers, Byard recorded five combined tackles (two solo) in the 31–27 comeback victory. In the Divisional Round against the Rams, he once again had five tackles (four solo) during the 20–17 overtime loss.

=== New England Patriots ===
On March 11, 2026, Byard signed a one-year, $9 million deal with the New England Patriots, reuniting him with head coach Mike Vrabel.

Byard made his Patriots debut during the season-opener against the Seahawks and finished the 13–10 road loss with five combined tackles (two solo).

== Career statistics ==
Legend
	Led the league
**Bold**	Career high

=== NFL ===
==== Regular season ====
Year	Team	Games		Tackles				Interceptions						Fumbles			
Year	Team	GP	GS	Cmb	Solo	Ast	Sck	PD	Int	Yds	Avg	Lng	TD	FF	FR	Yds	TD
2016	TEN	16	7	59	45	14	1.0	4	0	0	0.0	0	0	0	0	0	0
2017	TEN	16	16	87	62	25	0.0	**16**	**8**	**130**	**16.2**	33	0	0	**2**	6	0
2018	TEN	16	16	90	62	28	**2.0**	8	4	1	0.3	1	0	0	0	0	0
2019	TEN	16	16	84	60	24	0.0	9	5	79	15.8	28	0	0	0	0	0
2020	TEN	16	16	111	79	32	0.0	7	1	0	0.0	0	0	1	0	0	0
2021	TEN	17	17	88	58	30	1.0	13	5	66	13.2	24	**1**	**2**	1	**30**	**1**
2022	TEN	17	17	108	69	39	0.0	6	4	57	14.3	28	0	0	0	0	0
2023	TEN	6	6	47	30	17	0.0	0	0	0	0.0	0	0	0	1	0	0
2023	PHI	10	10	75	50	25	0.0	3	1	0	0.0	0	0	0	0	0	0
2024	CHI	17	17	**130**	**80**	**50**	**2.0**	7	1	0	0.0	0	0	1	**2**	0	0
2025	CHI	17	17	93	61	32	0.0	8	7	91	13.0	**35**	0	0	0	0	0
2026	NE	10	10	53	26	27	0.0	5	2	0	0.0	0	0	0	0	0	0
Career		173	164	1,025	681	344	6.0	86	38	424	11.2	35	1	4	6	36	1

==== Postseason ====
Year	Team	Games		Tackles				Interceptions						Fumbles			
Year	Team	GP	GS	Cmb	Solo	Ast	Sck	PD	Int	Yds	Avg	Lng	TD	FF	FR	Yds	TD
2017	TEN	2	2	15	14	1	0.0	0	0	0	0.0	0	0	0	0	0	0
2019	TEN	3	3	**21**	**15**	**6**	0.0	**1**	**1**	**31**	**31.0**	**31**	0	0	0	0	0
2020	TEN	1	1	5	2	3	0.0	**1**	0	0	0.0	0	0	0	0	0	0
2021	TEN	1	1	3	3	0	0.0	0	0	0	0.0	0	0	0	0	0	0
2023	PHI	1	1	5	5	0	0.0	0	0	0	0.0	0	0	0	0	0	0
2025	CHI	2	2	10	6	4	0.0	0	0	0	0.0	0	0	0	0	0	0
Career		10	10	59	45	14	0.0	2	1	31	31.0	31	0	0	0	0	0

=== College ===
Season	Team	Conf	Class	Pos	GP	Tackles					Interceptions					Fumbles			
Season	Team	Conf	Class	Pos	GP	Solo	Ast	Cmb	TfL	Sck	Int	Yds	Avg	TD	PD	FR	Yds	TD	FF
2011	Middle Tennessee	Sun Belt	FR	DB	0	Redshirt													
2012	Middle Tennessee	Sun Belt	FR	DB	12	48	26	74	0.0	0.0	4	**167**	**41.8**	**2**	0	0	0	0	0
2013	Middle Tennessee	CUSA	SO	S	13	**61**	**45**	**106**	2.0	0.0	5	159	31.8	**2**	5	**1**	0	0	1
2014	Middle Tennessee	CUSA	JR	S	12	44	28	72	**3.0**	0.0	**6**	1	0.2	0	4	0	0	0	**2**
2015	Middle Tennessee	CUSA	SR	S	11	43	23	66	1.0	0.0	4	50	12.5	0	**6**	0	0	0	0
Career					48	196	122	318	6.0	0.0	19	377	19.8	4	15	1	0	0	3

== Career highlights ==
=== Awards and honors ===
NFL

- 3× First-team All-Pro (2017, 2021, 2025)
- 3× Pro Bowl (2017, 2021, 2025)
- 2× NFL interceptions leader (2017, 2025)
- 3× NFL Top 100 — 80th (2018), 34th (2022), 61st (2026)

College

- 2× First-team All-C-USA (2014, 2015)
- Second-team All-Sun Belt (2012)
- Middle Tennessee Blue Raiders No. 20 retired

=== NFL records ===
- Longest touchdown pass by a defensive player in the Super Bowl era: 66 yards

==== Titans franchise records ====
- First player in team history to record five interceptions in a two-game span

== Personal life ==
Byard married his girlfriend, Clarke Conner, in 2018. They had their first child, a daughter, Eliana Rose, on August 22, 2019. Their son, Kevin IV, was born on August 23, 2020.

Byard is a Christian. He is also called the "Mayor of Murfreesboro" as a nickname referencing his college town.
