= Kristian Fulton =

American football player (born 1998)

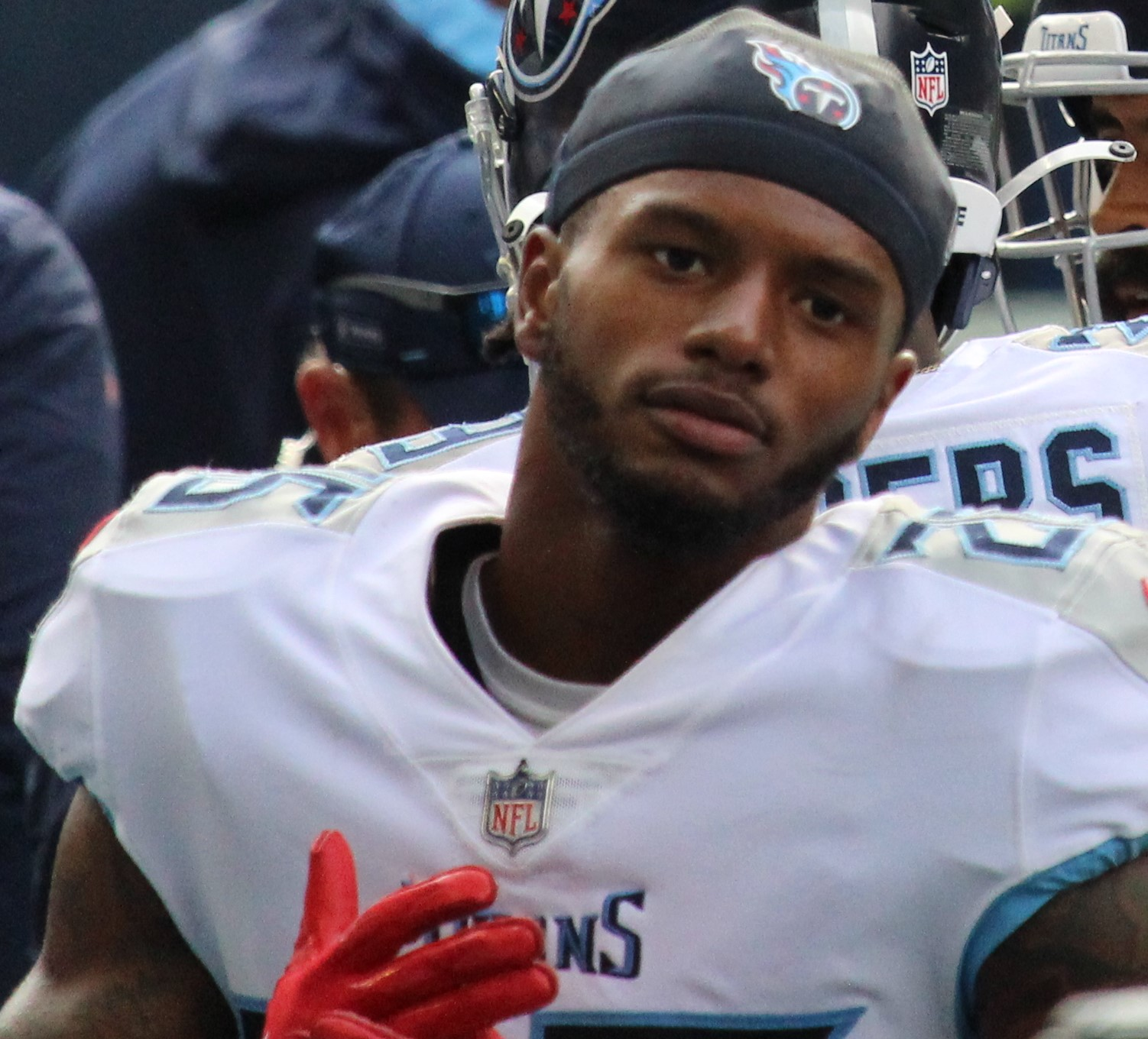
- Fulton with the Tennessee Titans in 2021

No. 8 – Kansas City Chiefs
- Position: Cornerback
- Roster status: Active

Personal information
- Born: September 3, 1998 (age 28); New Orleans, Louisiana, U.S.
- Listed height: 5 ft 11 in (1.80 m)
- Listed weight: 197 lb (89 kg)

Career information
- High school: Archbishop Rummel (Metairie, Louisiana)
- College: LSU (2016–2019)
- NFL draft: 2020: 2nd round, 61st overall pick

Career history
- Tennessee Titans (2020–2023); Los Angeles Chargers (2024); Kansas City Chiefs (2025–present)

Awards and highlights
- CFP national champion (2019); Second-team All-SEC (2019)

Career NFL statistics as of 2025
- Total tackles: 217
- Sacks: 1
- Forced fumbles: 1
- Fumble recoveries: 1
- Pass deflections: 38
- Interceptions: 5
- Stats at Pro Football Reference

Kristian Michael Shaw Fulton (born September 3, 1998) is an American professional football cornerback for the Kansas City Chiefs of the National Football League (NFL). He played college football for the LSU Tigers and was selected by the Tennessee Titans in the second round of the 2020 NFL draft.

== Early life ==
Fulton was born and grew up in New Orleans, Louisiana, and attended Archbishop Rummel High School, where he played football and ran track. He was named the New Orleans area Defensive Player of the Year by The New Orleans Advocate as a junior after finishing the season with 11 interceptions, 27 tackles and eight passes defended despite missing three games due to injury. Fulton was named first-team Class 5A All-State as a senior and also was invited to play in the 2016 Under Armour All-America Game. Fulton was rated a five star recruit by 247 Sports and given a four star rating Rivals, Scout and ESPN and was rated a consensus top-5 prospect at the cornerback position. He committed to play college football at Louisiana State University over Florida and Arkansas. Fulton was also named first-team All-State in track as a senior in the 300 meters hurdles.

== College career ==
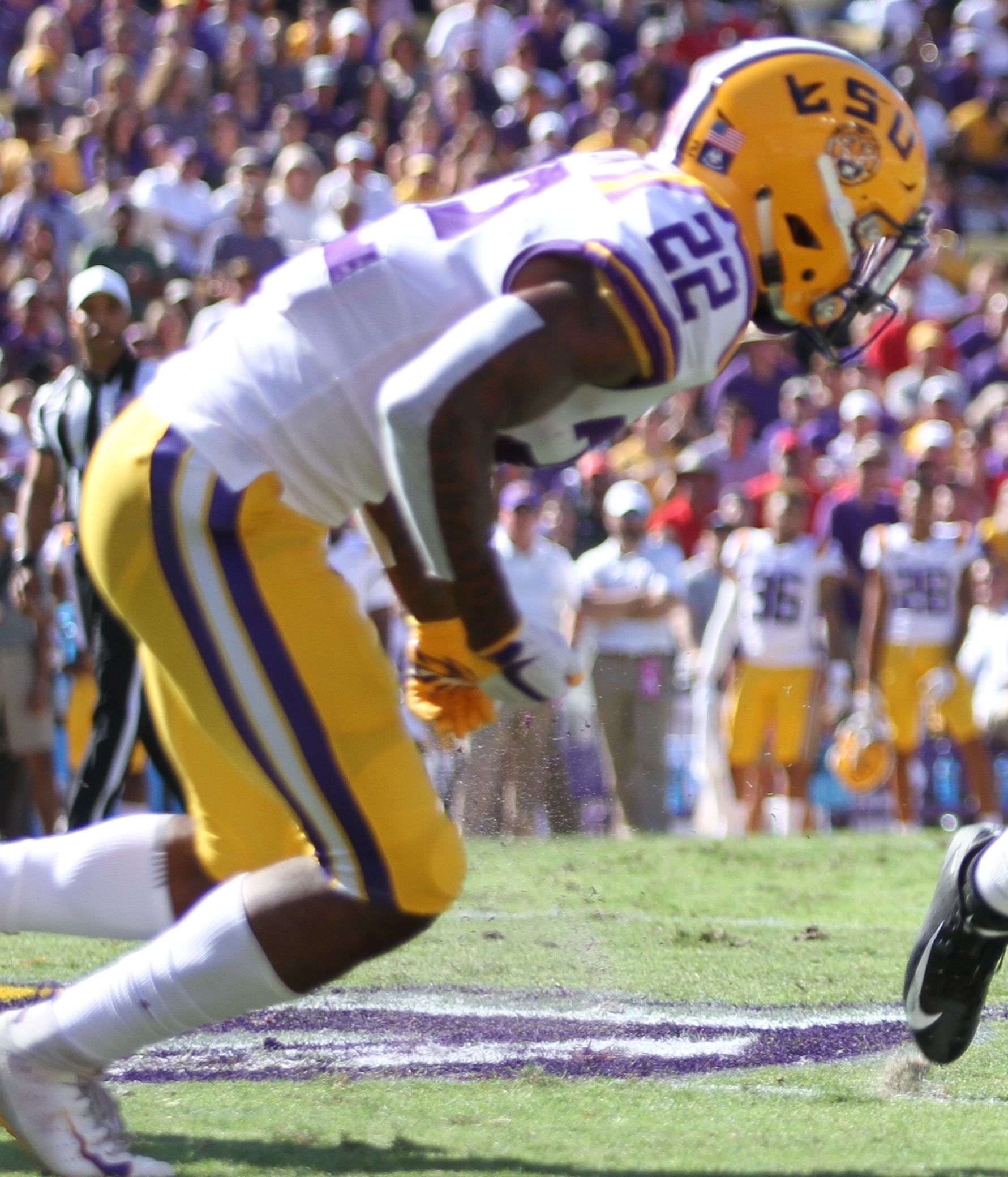
Fulton in 2018

Fulton appeared in three games as a freshman, making two tackles. Following the season, Fulton was suspended by the NCAA for two seasons after he tampered with a drug test for performance enhancing drugs on February 2, 2017. He appealed the decision, arguing that he believed that the test was for recreational narcotics, but the initial appeal was denied in March 2017. Fulton sat out the entirety of the 2017 season, but remained with the team and participated in daily practices. Fulton then filed a second appeal after hiring an attorney arguing that proper drug testing protocol was not followed. The second appeal was also originally denied by a panel of NCAA officials on August 9, 2018, but the decision was overturned on August 23.

Fulton entered his junior season as a starter at cornerback for the Tigers, despite not having played in a game in 18 months. He started the first ten games of the season for LSU before suffering a season ending ankle injury against Arkansas and finished the season with 25 tackles (one for loss), an interception, and nine passes defended. Entering his senior season, Fulton was named a preseason All-American by the Associated Press and the third-best defensive back in the nation by USA Today. He finished the season with 38 tackles, one interception and 14 passes defended as LSU won the 2020 National Championship.

== Professional career ==
=== Pre-draft ===
During the pre-draft process, a past incident that Fulton was responsible for prior to the 2018 season was a source of contention about his character. Pro Football Focus ranked Fulton second (12th overall) amongst all cornerbacks in the 2020 NFL Draft. Sports Illustrated ranked him as the third best cornerback in the draft. NFL draft analysts Bucky Brooks and Daniel Jeremiah had him ranked as the fifth best cornerback prospect. ESPN analyst Mel Kiper Jr. and Dane Brugler of the Athletic had Fulton ranked as the seventh best cornerback available in the draft. Jeff Legwold of ESPN had Fulton ranked as the seventh best cornerback (41st overall) entering the draft. NFL draft analysts and scouts projected that Fulton would be a late-first or second round selection in the 2020 NFL draft.

External videos
- Kristian Fulton runs 4.46s 40-yard dash
- Kristian Fulton's Combine Workout

Pre-draft measurables
Height	Weight	Arm length	Hand span	Wingspan	40-yard dash	10-yard split	20-yard split	20-yard shuttle	Three-cone drill	Vertical jump	Broad jump
5 ft 11 5/8 in (1.82 m)	197 lb (89 kg)	30 5/8 in (0.78 m)	9 1/8 in (0.23 m)	5 ft 11 7/8 in (1.83 m)	4.46 s	1.48 s	2.61 s	4.36 s	6.94 s	35.5 in (0.90 m)	10 ft 3 in (3.12 m)
All values from NFL Combine

=== Tennessee Titans ===
The Tennessee Titans selected Fulton in the second round (61st overall) of the 2020 NFL draft. He was the ninth cornerback drafted. He was the first of two cornerbacks selected by the Titans in 2020, along with seventh round pick (243rd overall) Chris Jackson, to provide necessary depth following the departures of Logan Ryan, LeShaun Sims, and Tramaine Brock.

External videos
- Titans selected Kristian Fulton No. 61
- Kristian Fulton's College Highlights

==== 2020 ====
On July 27, 2020, the Tennessee Titans signed Fulton to a four–year, $5.33 million rookie contract that included $2.28 million guaranteed upon signing and an initial signing bonus of $1.43 million.

Throughout training camp, he competed against Adoree Jackson, Malcolm Butler, and Johnathan Joseph to be a starting cornerback. He missed a large portion of training camp due to a knee injury. Head coach Mike Vrabel named Fulton a backup and listed him as the fourth cornerback on the depth chart to begin the season, behind Malcolm Butler, Adoree Jackson, and Johnathan Joseph.

On September 14, 2020, Fulton made his professional regular season debut in the Tennessee Titans' season-opener at the Denver Broncos and had four combined tackles (three solo) during their 16–14 victory. In Week 2, Fulton made three solo tackles, one pass deflection, and had his first career interception on a pass thrown by Gardner Minshew to wide receiver Collin Johnson and returned it 44–yards as the Titans defeated the Jacksonville Jaguars 33–30. The following week, he had two solo tackles and made his first career sack on Kirk Cousins for a seven–yard loss during a 31–30 victory at the Minnesota Vikings in Week 3. On October 1, 2020, the Titans placed him on the COVID-19/reserve list. On October 13, 2020, the Titans activated him from the COVID-19/reserve list and added him back to their active roster after he was inactive for the Titans' 42–16 win against the Buffalo Bills in Week 4. Upon his return, head coach Mike Vrabel named him the starting nickelback after Adoree Jackson was placed on injured reserve due to a knee injury. In Week 5, Fulton earned his first career start and had three solo tackles during a 42–36 overtime victory against the Houston Texans. On October 25, 2020, Fulton made three combined tackles (two solo) before exiting during the third quarter of a 24–27 loss to the Pittsburgh Steelers after injuring his knee. On October 31, 2020, the Titans officially placed him on injured reserve due to a knee injury. On December 15, 2020, He was activated off of injured reserve after being inactive for nine consecutive games (Weeks 9–18). He finished his rookie season in 2020 with only 16 combined tackles (14 solo), one pass deflection, one sack, and one interception in six games and two starts. He received an overall grade of 54.1 from Pro Football Focus as a rookie in 2020.

==== 2021 ====
He began training camp as a top candidate to be the No. 1 starting cornerback, but had to compete against Janoris Jenkins, Kevin Johnson, and Caleb Farley following the departures of Malcolm Butler, Adoree Jackson, and Johnathan Joseph. Head coach Mike Vrabel named Fulton and Janoris Jenkins the starting cornerbacks to begin the season.

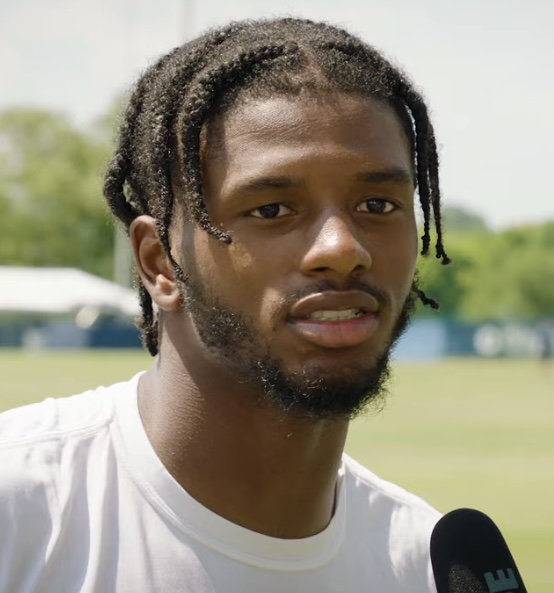
Fulton in 2021

In Week 4, he made three solo tackles, one pass deflection, and intercepted a pass by Zach Wilson to wide receiver Corey Davis during a 24–27 overtime loss at the New York Jets. On October 10, 2021, Fulton set a season-high with five combined tackles (four solo) and had one pass deflection before exiting during the fourth quarter of a 37–19 victory at the Jacksonville Jaguars after injuring his hamstring. On October 18, 2021, the Titans officially placed him on injured reserve due to his hamstring injury. On November 10, 2021, the Titans removed him from injured reserve and added him to their "Designated for Return From Injured Reserve" list. On November 13, 2021, the Titans activated him from the designated for return list after he was inactive for four games (Weeks 6–9). In Week 14, he had four combined tackles (three solo), two pass deflections, and set a career-high with his second interception of the season on a pass attempt thrown by Trevor Lawrence to wide receiver Jaydon Mickens as the Titans defeated the Jacksonville Jaguars 20–0. He finished the season with 40 combined tackles (30 solo), a career-high 14 pass deflections, and had two interceptions in 13 games and 13 starts. He received an overall grade of 64.1 from Pro Football Focus in 2021. Pro Football Focus had him finish the season with an overall grade of 64.1 in 2021.

The Tennessee Titans finished the 2021 NFL season first in the AFC South with a 12–5 record to earn a first-round bye. On January 22, 2022, Fulton earned a start in his first career playoff game and recorded six combined tackles (four solo) during a 16–19 loss against the Cincinnati Bengals in the AFC Divisional Round.

==== 2022 ====
He entered training camp slated as the de facto No. 1 starting cornerback following the departure of Janoris Jenkins. Head coach Mike Vrabel named Fulton a starting cornerback to begin the season, alongside Caleb Farley and rookie Roger McCreary. He was inactive during a 7–41 loss at the Buffalo Bills in Week 2 due to a hamstring injury. On October 30, 2022, Fulton made three combined tackles (two solo), set a season-high with two pass deflections, and had his lone interception of the season on a pass by Davis Mills to tight end Brevin Jordan during a 17–10 victory at the Houston Texans. He was inactive for four consecutive games (Weeks 14–17) after suffering a groin injury. He finished the 2022 NFL season with a total of 48 combined tackles (35 solo), five pass deflections, a forced fumble, one fumble recovery, and one interception in 11 games and 11 starts.

==== 2023 ====
Head coach Mike Vrabel named him the No. 1 starting cornerback to begin the season and paired him with Sean Murphy-Bunting. On September 24, 2023, Fulton set a season-high with nine combined tackles (seven solo) during a 3–27 loss at the Cleveland Browns. On December 13, 2023, the Titans placed him on injured reserve due to a reoccurring hamstring injury. He remained inactive for the remaining five games (Weeks 14–18) of the season. He finished the 2023 NFL season with a total of 47 combined tackles (36 solo) and five pass deflections in 12 games and 11 starts. He received an overall grade of 46.4 from Pro Football Focus in 2023, which ranked 118th among all qualifying cornerbacks.

=== Los Angeles Chargers ===
==== 2024 ====
On March 22, 2024, the Los Angeles Chargers signed Fulton to a one–year, $3.12 million contract that included $2.44 million guaranteed and a signing bonus of $1.12 million. He entered training camp slated as the No. 2 starting cornerback following the departure of Michael Davis. Head coach Jim Harbaugh named him a starting cornerback to begin the season and paired him with Asante Samuel Jr.

In Week 3, Fulton set a season-high with seven solo tackles and made two pass deflections during a 10–20 loss at the Pittsburgh Steelers. The following week, Fulton made two combined tackles (one solo), two pass deflections, and intercepted a pass thrown by Patrick Mahomes to tight end Travis Kelce during a 10–17 loss against the Kansas City Chiefs. He was inactive for two games (Weeks 9–10) after he sustained a hamstring injury. On November 17, 2024, he made two solo tackles and set a season-high with three pass deflections during a 34–27 victory against the Cincinnati Bengals. He finished the season with 51 combined tackles (39 solo), seven passes defended, and one interception in 15 games and 15 starts. He received an overall grade of 71.1 from Pro Football Focus, which ranked 40th among 222 qualifying cornerbacks in 2024.

=== Kansas City Chiefs ===
On March 13, 2025, the Kansas City Chiefs signed Fulton to a two–year, $20 million contract that includes $15 million guaranteed upon signing and an initial signing bonus of $6 million.
