= Hovnanian =

Hovnanian (Armenian: Հովնանյան; Western Armenian: Յովնանեան) is an Armenian surname.

It may refer to:

People:

- Jirair Hovnanian (1927–2007), founder of J.S. Hovnanian & Sons home builders
- Kevork Hovnanian (1923–2009), founder of Hovnanian Enterprises

Companies:

- Hovnanian Enterprises, public construction corporation founded by Kevork Hovnanian
