= Hovnan =

Hovnan is an Armenian given name, from the name of the Hebrew prophet Jonah. Notable people with the name include:

- Hovnan Derderian (born 1957), Armenian cleric
- Hovnan Mayravanetsi (c. 572–650), Armenian theologian and philosopher

== See also ==
- Hovnanian (disambiguation)
