= Temple Shaari Emeth =

Reform synagogue in Manalapan, New Jersey, United States

- Hebrew: השערים של אמת
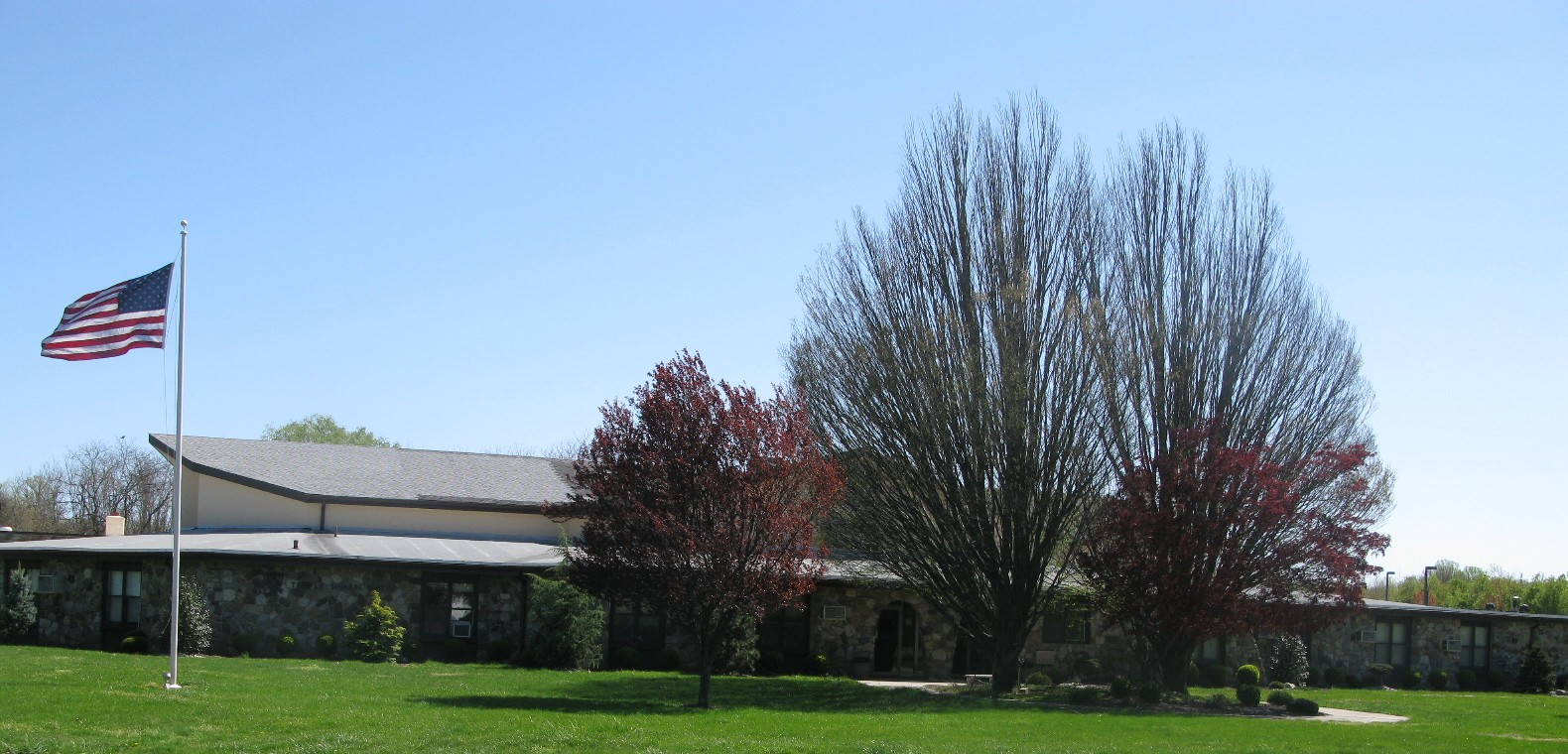

- Location in New Jersey

Religion
- Affiliation: Reform Judaism
- Ecclesiastical or organizational status: Synagogue
- Leadership: Rabbi Melinda F. Panken; Rabbi Philip E. Schechter (Emeritus)
- Status: Active

Location
- Location: 400 Craig Road, Manalapan, NJ 07726
- Country: United States
- Interactive map of Temple Shaari Emeth
- Coordinates: 40°17′06″N 74°18′01″W

Architecture
- Established: 1966 (as a congregation)
- Groundbreaking: 1969
- Completed: 1970

Website
- shaariemeth.org

Temple Shaari Emeth (Hebrew: השערים של אמת, lit. 'Gates of truth') is a Reform Jewish synagogue located at 400 Craig Road in Manalapan, New Jersey, in the United States.

== History ==
Founded in 1966, Temple Shaari Emeth originally had 50 member families, and had its facilities at two Manalapan residences. Irwin Goldenberg was the congregation's first religious leader. The congregation established a religious school, with 23 students attending the first class which was held on February 18, 1966, at the two Manalapan homes. The U.S. Route 9 corridor in Manalapan was expanding quickly, and many Jewish families from New York City were relocating to the area. By 1967, the members of Temple Shaari Emeth needed more space for the growing congregation. In 1968, Kevork Hovnanian donated 3.5 acres of land on Craig Road in Manalapan. Construction of the new synagogue began in May 1969 and was completed in April 1970. The synagogue underwent a major renovation in 1990.

== Religious school ==
The religious school has 527 students in grades K-10, with another 16 students enrolled in the school's post-confirmation program (grades 11–12).

== Clergy ==
Rabbi Peter Kasdan of Marlboro served as the temple's religious leader from 1969 to 1971. He was succeeded by Rabbi Phillip Schechter of Freehold, who occupied the position for the next 29 years. In 2003, Rabbi Melinda Panken of New York City became the congregation's religious leader.

== Notable members ==
- Anthony Firkser (born 1995), football tight end for the New England Patriots of the National Football League
