= 2019–20 NFL playoffs =

American football tournament

- Dates: January 4, – February 2, 2020
- Season: 2019
- Teams: 12
- Games played: 11
- Super Bowl LIV site: Hard Rock Stadium; Miami Gardens, Florida
- Defending champions: New England Patriots
- Champion: Kansas City Chiefs (2nd title)
- Runner-up: San Francisco 49ers
- Conference runners-up: Green Bay Packers; Tennessee Titans
NFL playoffs
| ← 2018–19 | 2020–21 → |

The National Football League playoffs for the 2019 season began with the Wild Card Round on January 4, 2020, and concluded with Super Bowl LIV at Hard Rock Stadium in Miami Gardens, Florida, on February 2, when the Kansas City Chiefs beat the San Francisco 49ers 31–20.

For the first time since 2010–11, the New England Patriots did not appear in the AFC Championship Game, and for the first time since 2015–16, they did not play in the Super Bowl, as they were eliminated in the wild card round by the Tennessee Titans.

The Philadelphia Eagles' game against the Seattle Seahawks in the NFC Wild Card Round made the Eagles the second team in NFL history (the first being the Los Angeles Rams) to face every team within their respective conference in the postseason at least once.

This was the last postseason in which the NFL playoffs used a 12–team format, making it also the last postseason in which the #2–seeded team in each conference received a first-round bye.

For the first time in NFL history, two wild card playoff games went to overtime; all four games were decided by one score.

== Participants ==
Within each conference, the four division winners and the top two non-division winners with the best overall regular season records) qualified for the playoffs. The four division winners are seeded 1–4 based on their overall won-lost-tied record, and the wild card teams are seeded 5–6. The NFL does not use a fixed bracket playoff system, and there are no restrictions regarding teams from the same division matching up in any round. In the first round, dubbed the wild-card playoffs or wild-card weekend, the third-seeded division winner hosts the sixth-seed wild card, and the fourth seed hosts the fifth. The 1 and 2 seeds from each conference received a first-round bye. In the second round, the divisional playoffs, the number 1 seed hosts the worst-surviving seed from the first round (seed 4, 5, or 6), while the number 2 seed will play the other team (seed 3, 4, or 5). The two surviving teams from each conference's divisional playoff games met in the respective AFC and NFC Conference Championship games, hosted by the higher seed. Although the Super Bowl, the championship round of the playoffs, is played at a neutral site, the designated home team is based on an annual rotation by conference.

Playoff seeds
| Seed | AFC | NFC |
|---|---|---|
| 1 | Baltimore Ravens (North winner) | San Francisco 49ers (West winner) |
| 2 | Kansas City Chiefs (West winner) | Green Bay Packers (North winner) |
| 3 | New England Patriots (East winner) | New Orleans Saints (South winner) |
| 4 | Houston Texans (South winner) | Philadelphia Eagles (East winner) |
| 5 | Buffalo Bills (wild card) | Seattle Seahawks (wild card) |
| 6 | Tennessee Titans (wild card) | Minnesota Vikings (wild card) |

== Bracket ==
Jan 5 – Lincoln Financial Field | Jan 12 – Lambeau Field
5 | Seattle | 17
5 | Seattle | 23
4 | Philadelphia | 9 | Jan 19 – Levi's Stadium
2 | Green Bay | 28
NFC
Jan 5 – Mercedes-Benz Superdome | 2 | Green Bay | 20
Jan 11 – Levi's Stadium
1 | San Francisco | 37
6 | Minnesota | 26* | NFC Championship
6 | Minnesota | 10
3 | New Orleans | 20 | Feb 2 – Hard Rock Stadium
1 | San Francisco | 27
Wild-card round
Divisional round
Jan 4 – Gillette Stadium | N1 | San Francisco | 20
Jan 11 – M&T Bank Stadium
A2 | Kansas City | 31
6 | Tennessee | 20 | Super Bowl LIV
6 | Tennessee | 28
3 | New England | 13 | Jan 19 – Arrowhead Stadium
1 | Baltimore | 12
AFC
Jan 4 – NRG Stadium | 6 | Tennessee | 24
Jan 12 – Arrowhead Stadium
2 | Kansas City | 35
5 | Buffalo | 19 | AFC Championship
4 | Houston | 31
4 | Houston | 22*
2 | Kansas City | 51

* Indicates overtime victory

== Schedule ==
The league announced on May 22 that the two divisional games played on the Sunday would be moved back from their traditional 1:05 and 4:40 p.m. (EST) start times to 3:05 and 6:40 p.m. (EST), respectively, matching the conference championship games. This is to provide greater flexibility for West Coast teams, who no longer will have to play away games on the East Coast at 10:00 a.m. (PST) or be restricted from hosting games in that early time slot.

For the first time in four years, both AFC wild card games were on Saturday, and both NFC wild card games were on Sunday (instead of one each per day, as in previous years).

| Round | Away team | Score | Home team | Date | Kickoff (EST/UTC–5) | TV | Viewers (millions) | TV rating |
|---|---|---|---|---|---|---|---|---|
| Wild-card round | Buffalo Bills | 19–22 (OT) | Houston Texans | January 4, 2020 | 4:35 p.m. | ABC/ESPN | 26.3 | 15.2 |
| Wild-card round | Tennessee Titans | 20–13 | New England Patriots | January 4, 2020 | 8:15 p.m. | CBS | 31.4 | 17.1 |
| Wild-card round | Minnesota Vikings | 26–20 (OT) | New Orleans Saints | January 5, 2020 | 1:05 p.m. | Fox | 30.0 | 17.4 |
| Wild-card round | Seattle Seahawks | 17–9 | Philadelphia Eagles | January 5, 2020 | 4:40 p.m. | NBC | 35.1 | 19.2 |
| Divisional round | Minnesota Vikings | 10–27 | San Francisco 49ers | January 11, 2020 | 4:35 p.m. | NBC | 29.3 | 16.6 |
| Divisional round | Tennessee Titans | 28–12 | Baltimore Ravens | January 11, 2020 | 8:15 p.m. | CBS | 29.4 | 16.0 |
| Divisional round | Houston Texans | 31–51 | Kansas City Chiefs | January 12, 2020 | 3:05 p.m. | CBS | 35.4 | 20.3 |
| Divisional round | Seattle Seahawks | 23–28 | Green Bay Packers | January 12, 2020 | 6:40 p.m. | Fox | 37.2 | 20.0 |
| Conference championships | Tennessee Titans | 24–35 | Kansas City Chiefs | January 19, 2020 | 3:05 p.m. | CBS | 41.1 | 23.1 |
| Conference championships | Green Bay Packers | 20–37 | San Francisco 49ers | January 19, 2020 | 6:40 p.m. | Fox | 42.8 | 22.0 |
| Super Bowl LIV Hard Rock Stadium Miami Gardens, Florida | San Francisco 49ers | 20–31 | Kansas City Chiefs | February 2, 2020 | 6:30 p.m. | Fox | 102.1 | 41.6 |

== Wild-card round ==
=== Saturday, January 4, 2020 ===
==== AFC: Houston Texans 22, Buffalo Bills 19 (OT) ====
Buffalo Bills vs. Houston Texans – Game summary

| Quarter | 1 | 2 | 3 | 4 | OT | Total |
|---|---|---|---|---|---|---|
| Bills | 7 | 6 | 3 | 3 | 0 | 19 |
| Texans | 0 | 0 | 8 | 11 | 3 | 22 |

at NRG Stadium, Houston, Texas

- Date: January 4, 2020
- Game time: 3:35 p.m. CST/4:35 p.m. EST
- Game weather: None (retractable roof closed)
- Game attendance: 71,699
- Referee: Tony Corrente (99)
- TV announcers (ABC/ESPN): Joe Tessitore, Booger McFarland, Lisa Salters and John Parry
- Recap, Game Book

Game information

First quarter

- BUF – Josh Allen 16-yard pass from John Brown (Stephen Hauschka kick). 11:41. Bills 7–0. Drive: 6 plays, 75 yards, 3:19.

Second quarter

- BUF – Stephen Hauschka 40-yard field goal. 10:47. Bills 10–0. Drive: 11 plays, 69 yards, 4:45.
- BUF – Stephen Hauschka 40-yard field goal. 0:04. Bills 13–0. Drive: 15 plays, 74 yards, 5:41.

Third quarter

- BUF – Stephen Hauschka 38-yard field goal. 6:02. Bills 16–0. Drive: 8 plays, 18 yards, 3:57.
- HOU – Deshaun Watson 20-yard run (Deshaun Watson run). 1:33. Bills 16–8. Drive: 9 plays, 75 yards, 4:29.

Fourth quarter

- HOU – Kaʻimi Fairbairn 41-yard field goal. 10:55. Bills 16–11. Drive: 6 plays, 27 yards, 3:16.
- HOU – Carlos Hyde 5-yard pass from Deshaun Watson (Deshaun Watson–DeAndre Hopkins pass). 4:37. Texans 19–16. Drive: 8 plays, 74 yards, 4:52.
- BUF – Stephen Hauschka 47-yard field goal. 0:05. Tied 19–19. Drive: 11 plays, 41 yards, 1:11.

Overtime

- HOU – Kaʻimi Fairbairn 28-yard field goal. 3:20. Texans 22–19. Drive: 9 plays, 73 yards, 5:42.

Top passers

- BUF – Josh Allen – 24/46, 264 yards
- HOU – Deshaun Watson – 20/25, 247 yards, TD

Top rushers

- BUF – Josh Allen – 9 rushes, 92 yards
- HOU – Deshaun Watson – 14 rushes, 55 yards, TD

Top receivers

- BUF – Devin Singletary – 6 receptions, 76 yards
- HOU – DeAndre Hopkins – 6 receptions, 90 yards

Houston rallied back from a 16–0 third-quarter deficit – having been held to 62 total yards in the first half – to win with 3:20 remaining in overtime on Kaʻimi Fairbairn's 28-yard field goal, for Buffalo's sixth consecutive playoff loss since their last win in December 1995.

On the opening drive of the game, Bills quarterback Josh Allen rushed for 42 yards – the Bills' longest rush of the season – and then caught a 16-yard touchdown pass from receiver John Brown on a trick play to put Buffalo up 7–0. In the second quarter, Devin Singletary rushed for an 18-yard gain and Allen completed a 28-yard pass to Brown as the Bills drove 69 yards in 11 plays to go up 10–0 on Stephen Hauschka's 40-yard field goal. Then after a punt, Buffalo drove 74 yards in 15 plays to score on a second 40-yard field goal from Hauschka, giving them a 13–0 lead at halftime.

Five minutes into the third quarter, Texans receiver DeAndre Hopkins fumbled the ball while being tackled by Tre'Davious White, and Tremaine Edmunds recovered it on the Texans' 38-yard line. Buffalo then drove to the 12-yard line, but ended up settling for Hauschka's third field goal after Allen was sacked on third down by J. J. Watt, giving them a 16–0 lead. This time, Houston managed to respond, moving the ball 75 yards in 9 plays and scoring on a 20-yard touchdown run from quarterback Deshaun Watson; Watson also scored the ensuing two-point conversion to make the score 16–8. On the Bills' ensuing drive, linebacker Whitney Mercilus forced a fumble while sacking Allen, which Jacob Martin recovered for the Texans at midfield with 14:18 remaining. Watson then completed a 20-yard pass to Kenny Stills that set up Fairbairn's 41-yard field goal, cutting the score to 16–11.

After Buffalo punted on their next drive, Watson completed a 41-yard pass – on the drive's second play – to Hopkins on the Buffalo 28-yard line, and later connected with tight end Darren Fells for 14 yards to bring up first and goal from the 1-yard line. Running back Carlos Hyde fumbled a pitch from Watson, then was forced out of bounds for a 4-yard loss after he recovered the ball. On the next play, he caught a 5-yard touchdown pass from Watson. Hopkins caught Watson's pass for a two-point conversion, giving Houston their first lead at 19–16 with 4:42 remaining. Buffalo started out their next drive with a 38-yard completion from Allen to Singletary, and soon found themselves with a first down on the Texans' 25-yard line. After an incompletion, Frank Gore was dropped by Mike Adams for a 3-yard loss and then Allen was flagged for intentional grounding, pushing the team all the way back to the 42-yard line. Allen was sacked for a 19-yard loss by Martin on fourth-and-27, with a turnover on downs putting the Texans at Buffalo's 39-yard line with less than two minutes remaining. The Bills' defense managed to pin the Texans down, with Watson being stopped short by Star Lotulelei on fourth-and-1. Gaining the ball with 1:16 left, Allen led Buffalo 41 yards in 11 plays, including a 20-yard run by Allen, to score on Hauschka's 47-yard field goal, sending the game to overtime at 19–19.

After both teams punted on their first drive of overtime – Buffalo had to punt after a penalty pushed them out of field goal range – Houston drove 73 yards in 9 plays for the game-winning score; the key play of the drive was an 18-yard completion from Watson to running back Duke Johnson on third-and-18 from the Texans' 19-yard line. Then Watson rushed for 5 yards, Stills caught a pass for 10 yards, and Hyde rushed 4 yards to the Bills' 44-yard line. On the next play, Watson evaded a sack attempt by two Buffalo defenders and fired a short pass to reserve running back Taiwan Jones, who took off for a 34-yard gain to Buffalo's 10-yard line. Fairbairn then kicked a 28-yard field goal to give Houston the victory.

Watson completed 20 of 25 passes for 247 yards and a touchdown, while also rushing for 55 yards and a touchdown; Hopkins caught 6 passes for 90 yards. Allen completed 24 of 46 passes for 264 yards, while also rushing for 92 yards and catching a 16-yard touchdown pass. Singletary rushed for 58 yards and caught 6 passes for 76 yards. On the defense, Buffalo linebacker Matt Milano recorded 12 tackles (8 solo), while defensive end Trent Murphy had 6 tackles (4 solo) and 2 sacks.

==== AFC: Tennessee Titans 20, New England Patriots 13 ====
Tennessee Titans vs. New England Patriots – Game summary

| Quarter | 1 | 2 | 3 | 4 | Total |
|---|---|---|---|---|---|
| Titans | 7 | 7 | 0 | 6 | 20 |
| Patriots | 3 | 10 | 0 | 0 | 13 |

at Gillette Stadium, Foxborough, Massachusetts

- Date: January 4, 2020
- Game time: 7:15 p.m. CST/8:15 p.m. EST
- Game weather: Foggy, 44 °F (7 °C)
- Game attendance: 65,878
- Referee: John Hussey (35)
- TV announcers (CBS): Jim Nantz, Tony Romo, Tracy Wolfson and Gene Steratore
- Recap, Game Book

Game information

First quarter

- NE – Nick Folk 36-yard field goal. 12:37. Patriots 3–0. Drive: 8 plays, 57 yards, 2:23.
- TEN – Anthony Firkser 12-yard pass from Ryan Tannehill (Greg Joseph kick). 5:39. Titans 7–3. Drive: 12 plays, 75 yards, 6:58.

Second quarter

- NE – Julian Edelman 5-yard run (Nick Folk kick). 14:57. Patriots 10–7. Drive: 10 plays, 75 yards, 5:42.
- NE – Nick Folk 36-yard field goal. 2:16. Patriots 13–7. Drive: 10 plays, 44 yards, 5:44.
- TEN – Derrick Henry 1-yard run (Greg Joseph kick). 0:35. Titans 14–13. Drive: 7 plays, 75 yards, 1:41.

Third quarter

- No scoring plays.

Fourth quarter

- TEN – Logan Ryan 9-yard interception return (run failed). 0:09. Titans 20–13.

Top passers

- TEN – Ryan Tannehill – 8/15, 72 yards, TD, INT
- NE – Tom Brady – 20/37, 209 yards, INT

Top rushers

- TEN – Derrick Henry – 34 rushes, 182 yards, TD
- NE – Sony Michel – 14 rushes, 61 yards

Top receivers

- TEN – Anthony Firkser – 2 receptions, 23 yards, TD
- NE – James White – 5 receptions, 62 yards

Tennessee running back Derrick Henry accounted for 204 of the Titans' 272 total offensive yards, including 34 carries for 182 yards and a touchdown as he led his team to victory. For the Patriots, it was the first time they failed to win a playoff game in a season since 2010. As a result, New England's streak of AFC Championship appearances ended at eight.

New England took the opening kickoff and drove 57 yards in 8 plays, the longest a 21-yard completion from Tom Brady to tight end Benjamin Watson. Nick Folk finished the drive with a 36-yard field goal to put the Patriots up 3–0. Tennessee struck back, with Henry carrying the ball 6 times for 44 yards on a 75-yard drive, that gave the team a 7–3 lead with Ryan Tannehill's 12-yard touchdown pass to Anthony Firkser, the first playoff touchdown scored by a Harvard University graduate. New England then moved the ball 75 yards in 10 plays, featuring a 25-yard run by Sony Michel. Receiver Julian Edelman finished the drive with a 5-yard touchdown run – his first such touchdown – on an end around play on the first play of the second quarter, giving the Patriots a 10–7 lead. Later on, Patriots receiver Mohamed Sanu returned a punt 23 yards to the Titans' 47-yard line, and the team drove on to a first and goal on the 1-yard line. The Titans held out on the goal line; linebacker Rashaan Evans dropped Michel for a 1-yard loss on first down, Rex Burkhead was tackled on the 1-yard line by Evans and DaQuan Jones on second down and Evans tackled Michel for a 2-yard loss on third down. The Patriots took a 13–7 lead on Folk's 21-yard field goal with 2:16 left in the half. Henry took off for a 29-yard gain on the first play of the team's ensuing drive, before picking up 23 more yards with his next three carries after an incompletion. Henry then ran a screen pass 22 yards to the Patriots' 1-yard line, ultimately converting a 1-yard touchdown run to give the Titans a 14–13 halftime lead.

This would turn out to be the last offensive score of the game, as both teams combined for a total of 9 punts in the second half. New England got a mild scoring chance when Duron Harmon intercepted a pass from Tannehill – who finished with 72 passing yards – at New England's 41-yard line, but the offense could only move the ball to Tennessee's 47-yard line before being forced to punt. In the final minute of the game, Tennessee punter Brett Kern's 58-yard kick pinned the Patriots back at their own 1-yard line. On the next play, Titans defensive back Logan Ryan, who formerly played for New England, intercepted Brady's pass and returned it for a 9-yard touchdown, making the final score 20–13 after a failed two-point conversion attempt. This would end up being Brady's last game with the Patriots, as he left New England in free agency and signed with the Tampa Bay Buccaneers in the offseason, which also made it the final game of the Brady–Belichick era.

=== Sunday, January 5, 2020 ===
==== NFC: Minnesota Vikings 26, New Orleans Saints 20 (OT) ====
Minnesota Vikings vs. New Orleans Saints – Game summary

| Quarter | 1 | 2 | 3 | 4 | OT | Total |
|---|---|---|---|---|---|---|
| Vikings | 3 | 10 | 7 | 0 | 6 | 26 |
| Saints | 3 | 7 | 0 | 10 | 0 | 20 |

at Mercedes-Benz Superdome, New Orleans, Louisiana

- Date: January 5, 2020
- Game time: 12:05 p.m. CST/1:05 p.m. EST
- Game weather: None (indoor stadium)
- Game attendance: 73,038
- Referee: Carl Cheffers (51)
- TV announcers (Fox): Joe Buck, Troy Aikman, Erin Andrews, Chris Myers and Mike Pereira
- Recap, Game Book

Game information

First quarter

- NO – Wil Lutz 29-yard field goal, 9:52. Saints 3–0. Drive: 8 plays, 26 yards, 4:18.
- MIN – Dan Bailey 43-yard field goal, 4:05. Tied 3–3. Drive: 11 plays, 50 yards, 5:47.

Second quarter

- NO – Alvin Kamara 4-yard run (Wil Lutz kick), 9:18. Saints 10–3. Drive: 4 plays, 70 yards, 2:12.
- MIN – Dan Bailey 21-yard field goal, 2:54. Saints 10–6. Drive: 13 plays, 72 yards, 6:24.
- MIN – Dalvin Cook 5-yard run (Dan Bailey kick), 0:23. Vikings 13–10. Drive: 7 plays, 45 yards, 1:40.

Third quarter

- MIN – Dalvin Cook 1-yard run (Dan Bailey kick), 3:23. Vikings 20–10. Drive: 8 plays, 64 yards, 3:37.

Fourth quarter

- NO – Taysom Hill 20-yard pass from Drew Brees (Wil Lutz kick), 10:31. Vikings 20–17. Drive: 8 plays, 85 yards, 4:22.
- NO – Wil Lutz 49-yard field goal, 0:02. Tied 20–20. Drive: 7 plays, 39 yards, 1:53.

Overtime

- MIN – Kyle Rudolph 4-yard pass from Kirk Cousins, 10:40. Vikings 26–20. Drive: 9 plays, 75 yards, 4:20.

Top passers

- MIN – Kirk Cousins – 19/31, 242 yards, TD
- NO – Drew Brees – 26/33, 208 yards, TD, INT

Top rushers

- MIN – Dalvin Cook – 28 rushes, 94 yards, 2 TD
- NO – Taysom Hill – 4 rushes, 50 yards

Top receivers

- MIN – Adam Thielen – 7 receptions, 129 yards
- NO – Michael Thomas – 7 receptions, 70 yards

Despite fumbling the ball on the second play of the game, Adam Thielen ultimately led the Vikings to victory with 7 receptions for 129 yards, including a 43-yard catch in overtime that set up the game winning score from tight end Kyle Rudolph, giving the Vikings their first playoff win on the road since January 2005.

Janoris Jenkins tackled Thielen to force the ball loose, and Vonn Bell recovered it for the Saints, returning it 6 yards to the Minnesota 37-yard line. New Orleans then drove to third-and-goal from the 4-yard line before Everson Griffen and Danielle Hunter's shared sack on Drew Brees forced them to settle for a 29-yard field goal by Wil Lutz, making the score 3–0. Minnesota struck back with an 11-play, 50-yard drive, including a 16-yard run on an end around by receiver Alexander Mattison, to tie the game on Dan Bailey's 43-yard field goal. Midway into the second quarter, New Orleans drove 70 yards in four plays, featuring a 50-yard completion from reserve quarterback Taysom Hill to Deonte Harris. Alvin Kamara gave the Saints a 10–3 lead with a 4-yard touchdown run on the next play. The Vikings responded, with Dalvin Cook rushing 4 times for 31 yards and catching a 22-yard pass on a 13-play, 72-yard drive that ended with Bailey's 21-yard field goal, making the score 10–6. On the third play of the Saints' next drive, safety Anthony Harris intercepted a pass from Brees and returned it 30 yards to the New Orleans 45-yard line. Vikings quarterback Kirk Cousins went on to complete two passes to Thielen for gains of 19 and 13 yards as the team drove to a 13–10 lead on Cook's 5-yard touchdown run, with just 23 seconds left in the half. Deonte Harris returned the kickoff 54 yards to the Vikings' 45-yard line, which was followed with a 20-yard pass from Brees to Michael Thomas. Lutz attempted a 43-yard field goal, but this was missed to the right.

After the first three drives of the third quarter ended in punts, Minnesota drove 54 yards in 8 plays, the longest being a 34-yard catch by Thielen. Cook finished the drive with a 1-yard touchdown run to put the Vikings ahead 20–10. After a few more punts, New Orleans opened the fourth quarter with an eight-play, 85-yard drive in which Brees completed two 14-yard passes to tight end Jared Cook and a 18-yard pass to Ted Ginn Jr. before finding Hill in the end zone for a 20-yard touchdown, cutting their deficit to 20–17. After a punt, the Saints drove to the Vikings' 20-yard line, only to have Brees fumble the ball while being sacked by Hunter; this was recovered by defensive tackle Jalyn Holmes. After the Saints' defense forced the Vikings to punt after three plays, Brees completed five consecutive passes for 44 yards in the last 2 minutes to set up Lutz's 49-yard field goal, forcing overtime at 20–20. The Vikings took the opening kickoff in overtime and proceeded to drive 75 yards in 9 plays for the game winning score. After 3 carries for 20 yards by Cook and a 10-yard catch by Stefon Diggs, Cousins completed a 43-yard pass to Thielen, to move the ball to the Saints' 2-yard line. After losing two yards on a pair of carries by Cook, Cousins found Rudolph for a 4-yard touchdown pass to give the Vikings the victory, and record his first playoff win.

For the Vikings, Cousins completed 19 of 31 passes for 242 yards and a touchdown, and Cook rushed for 94 yards and two touchdowns, while also catching 3 passes for 36 yards. For the Saints, Brees finished the day 26-for-33 for 208 yards with a touchdown and an interception, while Deonte Harris had 227 total yards – a 50-yard reception, 133 yards from 3 kickoff returns and 44 yards from 4 punt returns. Hill became the first player to record at least 50 passing yards, 50 rushing yards and 25 receiving yards in a playoff game.

As of 2025, this was the last time that the Vikings won a playoff game.

==== NFC: Seattle Seahawks 17, Philadelphia Eagles 9 ====
Seattle Seahawks vs. Philadelphia Eagles – Game summary

| Quarter | 1 | 2 | 3 | 4 | Total |
|---|---|---|---|---|---|
| Seahawks | 3 | 7 | 7 | 0 | 17 |
| Eagles | 0 | 3 | 6 | 0 | 9 |

at Lincoln Financial Field, Philadelphia, Pennsylvania

- Date: January 5, 2020
- Game time: 1:40 p.m. PST/4:40 p.m. EST
- Game weather: Cloudy, 41 °F (5 °C)
- Game attendance: 69,796
- Referee: Shawn Smith (14)
- TV announcers (NBC): Al Michaels, Cris Collinsworth, Michele Tafoya and Terry McAulay
- Recap, Game Book

Game information

First quarter

- SEA – Jason Myers 49-yard field goal, 1:29. Seahawks 3–0. Drive: 10 plays, 46 yards, 4:48.

Second quarter

- PHI – Jake Elliott 46-yard field goal, 2:53. Tied 3–3. Drive: 13 plays, 64 yards, 5:53.
- SEA – Marshawn Lynch 5-yard run (Jason Myers kick), 1:06. Seahawks 10–3. Drive: 9 plays, 82 yards, 1:47.

Third quarter

- PHI – Jake Elliott 26-yard field goal, 10:36. Seahawks 10–6. Drive: 7 plays, 67 yards, 4:24.
- SEA – DK Metcalf 53-yard pass from Russell Wilson (Jason Myers kick), 8:46. Seahawks 17–6. Drive: 5 plays, 81 yards, 1:50.
- PHI – Jake Elliott 38-yard field goal, 2:49. Seahawks 17–9. Drive: 11 plays, 55 yards, 5:57.

Fourth quarter

- No scoring plays.

Top passers

- SEA – Russell Wilson – 18/30, 325 yards, TD
- PHI – Josh McCown – 18/24, 174 yards

Top rushers

- SEA – Russell Wilson – 9 rushes, 45 yards
- PHI – Miles Sanders – 14 rushes, 69 yards

Top receivers

- SEA – DK Metcalf – 7 receptions, 160 yards, TD
- PHI – Dallas Goedert – 7 receptions, 73 yards

The Eagles came into the game with five members of their practice squad from earlier in the season starting on offense, and they were unable to contain the Seahawks, especially after defensive end Jadeveon Clowney knocked Eagles starting quarterback Carson Wentz out of the game with a concussion in the first quarter. The Seahawks would go on to outgain the Eagles in yards 382–282, and hold on to win and advance to the Divisional round for the first time since 2016.

Seattle got a scoring opportunity on their second drive after an unnecessary roughness penalty on Eagles defensive back Craig James for tackling the Seahawks' punt returner after a fair catch had been called. From their own 46-yard line, the Seahawks then drove to the Eagles' 17-yard line, but Jason Myers' 35-yard field goal attempt was blocked. The next time Seattle got the ball, they drove 51 yards in 10 plays, the longest being DK Metcalf's 24-yard reception; Myers finished the drive with a 49-yard field goal to give the team a 3–0 lead. In the second quarter, Eagles backup quarterback Josh McCown – replacing Wentz, who left the game in the first quarter with a head injury – led the team 64 yards in 13 plays to tie the score on a 46-yard field goal from Jake Elliott. On the next drive, Seahawks quarterback Russell Wilson completed passes to Metcalf and David Moore for gains of 26 yards and 38 yards respectively, as the team drove 77 yards in 9 plays. On first and goal from the 5-yard line, Marshawn Lynch fought his way through multiple Eagles defenders, and muscled his way into the end zone, to give Seattle a 10–3 lead at halftime.

Philadelphia took the second half kickoff and drove 52 yards in seven plays, including McCown's 32-yard completion to tight end Zach Ertz, ultimately adding three points on Elliott's 26-yard field goal. On Seattle's next drive, Wilson completed a 20-yard pass to Lynch and followed it up with a 53-yard touchdown pass to Metcalf, giving Seattle a 17–6 lead. McCown responded by completing three passes for 49 yards and rushing for 4 yards, on a 55-yard drive that ended with Elliott's third field goal, that cut the Eagles' deficit to 17–9. The Eagles had two drives in the fourth quarter, both of which resulted in turnovers on downs: first they drove to the Seattle 24-yard line, only to lose the ball on a fourth down incompletion, and in the second instance, Jadeveon Clowney sacked McCown on fourth down, enabling Seattle's offense to run out the rest of the clock. Coincidentally, this game was a rematch between a regular season game between the two teams, and the Seahawks also won that game 17–9.

Wilson completed 18 of 30 passes for 325 yards and a touchdown, while also rushing for 45 yards. Metcalf caught seven passes for 160 yards – the most receiving yards by a rookie in a Super Bowl-era playoff game – and a touchdown. The Eagles had 282 yards of total offense, with McCown – who, at age 40, became the oldest quarterback to make his first appearance in an NFL playoff game – finishing 18-for-24 and passing for 174 yards.

== Divisional round ==
=== Saturday, January 11, 2020 ===
==== NFC: San Francisco 49ers 27, Minnesota Vikings 10 ====
Minnesota Vikings vs San Francisco 49ers – Game summary

| Quarter | 1 | 2 | 3 | 4 | Total |
|---|---|---|---|---|---|
| Vikings | 7 | 3 | 0 | 0 | 10 |
| 49ers | 7 | 7 | 10 | 3 | 27 |

at Levi's Stadium, Santa Clara, California

- Date: January 11, 2020
- Game time: 1:35 p.m. PST/3:35 p.m. CST/4:35 p.m. EST
- Game weather: Partly cloudy, 56 °F (13 °C)
- Game attendance: 71,649
- Referee: Walt Anderson (66)
- TV announcers (NBC): Al Michaels, Cris Collinsworth and Michele Tafoya
- Recap, Game Book

Game information

First quarter

- SF – Kendrick Bourne 3-yard pass from Jimmy Garoppolo (Robbie Gould kick), 9:30. 49ers 7–0. Drive: 8 plays, 61 yards, 4:11.
- MIN – Stefon Diggs 41-yard pass from Kirk Cousins (Dan Bailey kick), 5:23. Tied 7–7. Drive: 7 plays, 79 yards, 4:07.

Second quarter

- SF – Tevin Coleman 1-yard run (Robbie Gould kick), 7:10. 49ers 14–7. Drive: 10 plays, 53 yards, 5:35.
- MIN – Dan Bailey 39-yard field goal, 0:31. 49ers 14–10. Drive: 6 plays, 8 yards, 2:10.

Third quarter

- SF – Robbie Gould 35-yard field goal, 10:42. 49ers 17–10. Drive: 9 plays, 46 yards, 4:18.
- SF – Tevin Coleman 2-yard run (Robbie Gould kick), 4:54. 49ers 24–10. Drive: 8 plays, 44 yards, 4:55.

Fourth quarter

- SF – Robbie Gould 21-yard field goal, 14:13. 49ers 27–10. Drive: 4 plays, 7 yards, 1:52.

Top passers

- MIN – Kirk Cousins – 21/29, 172 yards, TD, INT
- SF – Jimmy Garoppolo – 11/19, 131 yards, TD, INT

Top rushers

- MIN – Dalvin Cook – 9 rushes, 18 yards
- SF – Tevin Coleman – 22 rushes, 105 yards, 2 TD

Top receivers

- MIN – Stefon Diggs – 2 receptions, 57 yards, TD
- SF – Deebo Samuel – 3 receptions, 42 yards

San Francisco dominated the Vikings, massively outgaining them in time of possession (38:27–21:33), first downs (21–7), rushing yards (186–21) and total yards (308–147).

After forcing Minnesota to punt on their opening drive, the 49ers drove 61 yards in eight plays, featuring a pair of completions from Jimmy Garoppolo to Emmanuel Sanders for gains of 22 and 11 yards – Sanders' only receptions of the game. Garoppolo, starting in the playoffs for the first time, ended the possession with a 3-yard touchdown pass to Kendrick Bourne that put the 49ers up 7–0. Minnesota responded by moving then ball 79 yards in seven plays to tie the score with Kirk Cousins' 41-yard touchdown completion to Stefon Diggs. In the second quarter, San Francisco took advantage of Richie James' 18-yard punt return that gave them a first down on the Vikings' 47-yard line. Moving the ball 53 yards in 10 plays, including an 18-yard catch by Deebo Samuel, the team took a 14–7 lead on a 1-yard touchdown run by Tevin Coleman. Following a Minnesota punt, Garoppolo threw a pass that was intercepted by linebacker Eric Kendricks, who returned it 4 yards to the 49ers' 29-yard line. This set up Dan Bailey's 29-yard field goal with 31 seconds left on the clock, making the score 14–10 at halftime.

On the second half kickoff, Vikings defender Mike Boone was flagged for unnecessary roughness while tackling James, turning James' 22-yard return into a 37-yard gain on the 49ers' 37-yard line. From there, San Francisco drove 46 yards, including a 21-yard catch by Bourne, to take a 17–10 lead on Robbie Gould's 35-yard field goal. Then on the third play of the Vikings' next drive, cornerback Richard Sherman intercepted Cousins and returned the ball 13 yards, giving San Francisco the ball on the Vikings' 44-yard line. Coleman went on to carry the ball on six of the next eight plays, picking up 36 of the drive's 44 yards, on the way to a 2-yard touchdown run that gave the 49ers a 24–10 lead. Later in the quarter, Vikings cornerback Marcus Sherels muffed Mitch Wishnowsky's 54-yard punt and Raheem Mostert recovered for San Francisco on the Vikings' 10-yard line. Three plays later, Gould's 21-yard field goal increased the 49ers' lead to 27–10, with less than a minute left in the third quarter. This turned out to be the last score of the game, as the Vikings' last 4 drives would result in two punts and two turnovers on downs.

Coleman was the top offensive performer for San Francisco, with 22 carries for 105 yards and two touchdowns. 49ers rookie lineman Nick Bosa had 6 tackles and 2 sacks in his playoff debut. Vikings running back Dalvin Cook, who rushed for 1,135 yards during the season, was held to just 18 yards on 9 carries. Minnesota running back Ameer Abdullah had 5 kickoff returns for 148 yards.

This was the sixth playoff meeting of the 49ers and Vikings, and the fifth 49ers victory.

==== AFC: Tennessee Titans 28, Baltimore Ravens 12 ====
Tennessee Titans vs. Baltimore Ravens – Game summary

| Quarter | 1 | 2 | 3 | 4 | Total |
|---|---|---|---|---|---|
| Titans | 7 | 7 | 14 | 0 | 28 |
| Ravens | 0 | 6 | 0 | 6 | 12 |

at M&T Bank Stadium, Baltimore, Maryland

- Date: January 11, 2020
- Game time: 7:15 p.m. CST/8:15 p.m. EST
- Game weather: Cloudy, 69 °F (21 °C)
- Game attendance: 71,254
- Referee: Bill Vinovich
- TV announcers (CBS): Ian Eagle, Dan Fouts, Evan Washburn and Gene Steratore
- Recap, Game Book

Game information

First quarter

- TEN – Jonnu Smith 12-yard pass from Ryan Tannehill (Greg Joseph kick), 3:36. Titans 7–0. Drive: 8 plays, 35 yards, 4:13.

Second quarter

- TEN – Kalif Raymond 45-yard pass from Ryan Tannehill (Greg Joseph kick), 14:45. Titans 14–0. Drive: 1 play, 45 yards, 0:08.
- BAL – Justin Tucker 49-yard field goal, 5:52. Titans 14–3. Drive: 12 plays, 59 yards, 5:21.
- BAL – Justin Tucker 22-yard field goal, 0:00. Titans 14–6. Drive: 14 plays, 91 yards, 2:32.

Third quarter

- TEN – Corey Davis 3-yard pass from Derrick Henry (Greg Joseph kick), 6:54. Titans 21–6. Drive: 6 plays, 81 yards, 3:01.
- TEN – Ryan Tannehill 1-yard run (Greg Joseph kick), 4:16. Titans 28–6. Drive: 6 plays, 20 yards, 2:28.

Fourth quarter

- BAL – Hayden Hurst 15-yard pass from Lamar Jackson (pass failed), 11:04. Titans 28–12. Drive: 10 plays, 88 yards, 3:45.

Top passers

- TEN – Ryan Tannehill – 7/14, 88 yards, 2 TD
- BAL – Lamar Jackson – 31/59, 365 yards, TD, 2 INT

Top rushers

- TEN – Derrick Henry – 30 rushes, 195 yards
- BAL – Lamar Jackson – 20 rushes, 143 yards

Top receivers

- TEN – Kalif Raymond – 1 reception, 45 yards
- BAL – Marquise Brown – 7 receptions, 126 yards

Tennessee stunned the heavily favored Ravens, who had the NFL's best record and had finished the year as the league's top scoring team, while also setting a new record for rushing yards in a season. Once again, Titans running back Derrick Henry accounted for most of the Tennessee offense, accounting for 205 of their 300 total yards. Meanwhile, Baltimore racked up 530 yards, but their three turnovers and four failed fourth-down conversion attempts proved too much to overcome. As a result, Baltimore became the first number 1 seed in the playoffs to lose to the number 6 seed since the New England Patriots lost to the New York Jets in 2011.

On the Ravens' first drive of the game, Lamar Jackson threw a pass that bounced off the hands of Mark Andrews and was intercepted by safety Kevin Byard, who returned it 31 yards, with an unnecessary roughness penalty against Jackson for a horse-collar tackle adding another 15 yards and giving Tennessee a first down on the Ravens' 35-yard line. Henry then carried the ball 4 times for 22 yards on an 8-play drive that ended with Ryan Tannehill's 12-yard touchdown pass to tight end Jonnu Smith, who made a leaping one-handed catch in the back of the end zone. After getting the ball back, Baltimore drove to a fourth-and-1 on their own 45-yard line. Jackson attempted to convert with a quarterback sneak, but he was tackled by linebacker David Long Jr. for no gain on the last play of the first quarter. On the next play, Tannehill gave the team a 14–0 lead with a 45-yard touchdown pass to Kalif Raymond. Following a punt from each team, Jackson completed a 30-yard pass to Marquise Brown and a 16-yard pass to Andrews, setting up Justin Tucker's 49-yard field goal to make the score 14–3. Then after a Titans punt, Jackson completed a 26-yard pass to Seth Roberts, as well as two completions to Brown for gains of 16 yards and 38 yards on a 91-yard drive. Tucker finished it off with a 22-yard field goal as time expired in the half, making the score 14–6 at halftime.

Baltimore took the second half kickoff and drove to a fourth-and-1 on the Titans' 18-yard line. Jackson again tried to convert with a run, but was stopped for no gain by linebacker Harold Landry. Two plays later on third-and-1, Henry took a handoff through the middle and ran for a 66-yard gain, to the Ravens' 6-yard line. Then when faced with third-and-goal from the 3-yard line, Henry took a direct snap out of wildcat formation and threw a jump pass to Corey Davis for a touchdown. This gave Tennessee a 21–6 lead and made Henry the first running back to throw a touchdown pass in the postseason since Allen Rice in the 1987 season. On the first play of the Ravens' next possession, defensive end Jurrell Casey forced a fumble while sacking Jackson, which Jeffery Simmons recovered for Tennessee on the Baltimore 20-yard line. From there, the Titans drove to a 28–6 lead, scoring on a 6-play drive that ended with Tannehill's 1-yard touchdown run. Baltimore responded with a drive to the Titans' 36-yard line, only to lose the ball again with a Jackson pass that was intercepted by safety Kenny Vaccaro. After forcing Tennessee to punt, the Ravens finally managed to score a touchdown, moving the ball 83 yards in 10 plays, the longest a 27-yard run by Jackson. Jackson finished the drive with a 15-yard touchdown pass to tight end Hayden Hurst, but his subsequent two-point conversion pass was incomplete, keeping the score at 28–12. Tennessee's defense then pinned down Baltimore for the rest of the game, forcing a turnover on downs on the Ravens' final two possessions.

Henry finished the game with 30 carries for 195 yards, while also catching two passes for 7 yards and throwing a 3-yard touchdown pass. He became the first player to rush for over 180 yards twice in the same postseason. Tannehill completed 7 of 14 pass attempts for 88 yards, and two touchdowns, while also rushing for 13 yards and a touchdown; Casey had four tackles, two sacks and a forced fumble. Jackson completed 31 of 59 passes for 365 yards and a touchdown, with two interceptions, while also rushing 20 times for 143 yards. This made him the first quarterback to throw for 300 yards and rush for 100 yards in a playoff game. His top receiver was Brown, who caught seven passes for 126 yards.

=== Sunday, January 12, 2020 ===
On May 22, 2019, the league announced that the divisional round games played on the Sunday would be moved from their traditional 1:00 p.m. (ET) and 4:30 p.m. (ET) start times to 3:00 p.m. (ET) and 6:30 p.m. (ET), respectively. Similar to the 2002 changes made to the start times of the Conference championship games, this would allow teams in the Mountain and Pacific time zones to play in the early Sunday game at a reasonable hour instead of at 11:00 a.m. or 10:00 a.m. local time.

==== AFC: Kansas City Chiefs 51, Houston Texans 31 ====
Houston Texans vs. Kansas City Chiefs – Game summary

| Quarter | 1 | 2 | 3 | 4 | Total |
|---|---|---|---|---|---|
| Texans | 21 | 3 | 7 | 0 | 31 |
| Chiefs | 0 | 28 | 13 | 10 | 51 |

at Arrowhead Stadium, Kansas City, Missouri

- Date: January 12, 2020
- Game time: 2:05 p.m. CST/3:05 p.m. EST
- Game weather: Cloudy, 29 °F (−2 °C)
- Game attendance: 73,503
- Referee: Shawn Hochuli
- TV announcers (CBS): Jim Nantz, Tony Romo, Tracy Wolfson, Jay Feely and Gene Steratore
- Recap, Game Book

Game information

First quarter

- HOU – Kenny Stills 54-yard pass from Deshaun Watson (Kaʻimi Fairbairn kick), 11:59. Texans 7–0. Drive: 6 plays, 75 yards, 3:01.
- HOU – Lonnie Johnson Jr. 10-yard return of blocked punt (Kaʻimi Fairbairn kick), 10:06. Texans 14–0.
- HOU – Darren Fells 4-yard pass from Deshaun Watson (Kaʻimi Fairbairn kick), 1:21. Texans 21–0. Drive: 2 plays, 6 yards, 0:48.

Second quarter

- HOU – Kaʻimi Fairbairn 31-yard field goal, 10:54. Texans 24–0. Drive: 9 plays, 38 yards, 4:55.
- KC – Damien Williams 17-yard pass from Patrick Mahomes (Harrison Butker kick), 9:55. Texans 24–7. Drive: 2 plays, 42 yards, 0:59.
- KC – Travis Kelce 5-yard pass from Patrick Mahomes (Harrison Butker kick), 8:05. Texans 24–14. Drive: 3 plays, 33 yards, 0:23.
- KC – Travis Kelce 6-yard pass from Patrick Mahomes (Harrison Butker kick), 6:31. Texans 24–21. Drive: 3 plays, 6 yards, 1:25.
- KC – Travis Kelce 5-yard pass from Patrick Mahomes (Harrison Butker kick), 0:44. Chiefs 28–24. Drive: 8 plays, 90 yards, 2:03.

Third quarter

- KC – Damien Williams 1-yard run (kick failed, wide left), 11:24. Chiefs 34–24. Drive: 7 plays, 85 yards, 3:36.
- KC – Damien Williams 5-yard run (Harrison Butker kick), 4:39. Chiefs 41–24. Drive: 6 plays, 77 yards, 3:55.
- HOU – Deshaun Watson 5-yard run (Kaʻimi Fairbairn kick), 0:24. Chiefs 41–31. Drive: 9 plays, 75 yards, 4:15.

Fourth quarter

- KC – Blake Bell 8-yard pass from Patrick Mahomes (Harrison Butker kick), 13:52. Chiefs 48–31. Drive: 4 plays, 72 yards, 1:32.
- KC – Harrison Butker 24-yard field goal, 8:06. Chiefs 51–31. Drive: 7 plays, 52 yards, 3:31.

Top passers

- HOU – Deshaun Watson – 31/52, 388 yards, 2 TD
- KC – Patrick Mahomes – 23/35, 321 yards, 5 TD

Top rushers

- HOU – Carlos Hyde – 13 rushes, 44 yards
- KC – Patrick Mahomes – 7 rushes, 53 yards

Top receivers

- HOU – DeAndre Hopkins – 9 receptions, 118 yards
- KC – Travis Kelce – 10 receptions, 134 yards, 3 TD

After falling behind 24–0, Kansas City came back with an NFL playoff record seven consecutive touchdowns and a field goal over their next eight drives, including a run of 28 points in the final 10 minutes of the second quarter.

On the opening possession, Houston mounted a six-play, 75-yard drive that culminated in Deshaun Watson's 54-yard touchdown pass to Kenny Stills on third-and-1, giving the Texans an early 7–0 lead. The Chiefs then went three-and-out on their first drive, with tight end Travis Kelce dropping a potential first down pass on third down. Dustin Colquitt's ensuing punt was blocked by Barkevious Mingo and recovered by Lonnie Johnson Jr., who returned it 10 yards for a touchdown that put the Texans up 14–0 less than five minutes into the game.

After both teams punted on their next drives, Chiefs returner Tyreek Hill muffed the ball inside his own 10-yard line which was recovered by Keion Crossen for Houston. Two plays later, Watson found tight end Darren Fells in the end zone for a 4-yard touchdown and a 21–0 lead late in the first quarter.

The next time Houston got the ball, they drove 48 yards in nine plays to a fourth-and-inches on the Chiefs 13-yard line. The Texans lined up to go for it. However, after having to call a timeout with the play clock running down, Texans coach Bill O'Brien changed his mind because he did not like their play call. So, rather than risk a potential turnover on downs, the Texans settled for Kaʻimi Fairbairn's 31-yard field goal to go up by 24 at the 10:54 mark of the second quarter. This would be the extent of their success, as the Chiefs went from being down 0-24 as late as 10:05 remaining in the 2nd quarter, to trailing 14–24 at the 8:05 mark, then 21–24 at 6:31, and finally taking the lead 28–24 at 0:44 remaining in the first half. The scoring would go on to be 51–7 in favor of the Chiefs from that 10:54 point in the 2nd quarter. First, Mecole Hardman returned the ensuing kickoff 58 yards to Houston's 42-yard line. Patrick Mahomes then threw a 25-yard pass to Kelce to get in the red zone before hitting running back Damien Williams for a 17-yard touchdown. After Houston went three-and-out on their next drive, they attempted a fake punt on fourth-and-4 with a direct snap to Justin Reid who was tackled by Daniel Sorensen two yards short, giving Kansas City the ball at the Texans 33. Johnson was then called for pass interference to put the ball at the five before Mahomes hit Kelce in the end zone to cut the deficit to 10. On the ensuing kickoff, DeAndre Carter fumbled the ball due to a hit by Sorenson, and it went right into the arms of Kansas City's Darwin Thompson, who returned it to the Houston 6-yard line. Mahomes then threw his third touchdown pass in less than four minutes, and his second to Kelce, to make the score 24–21.

Taking possession at their own 10 with 2:47 left in the quarter, the Chiefs went on a 90-yard drive that included another pass interference on Johnson, while Mahomes rushed twice for 35 yards and completed a pair of 20-yard passes to Hill and Kelce. Finally, with 44 seconds left in the half, Mahomes threw another five-yard touchdown to Kelce to give the Chiefs their first lead of the game, 28–24. Mahomes' four touchdown passes in the second quarter tied an NFL postseason record set by Doug Williams in Super Bowl XXII. Fairbairn missed a 51-yard field goal as time expired in the half as the Chiefs became the first team in NFL history to fall behind 24-plus points in the first half but still lead at halftime.

The Chiefs would extend their lead on the opening possession of the third quarter, going 85 yards in seven plays, the longest a 48-yard catch by Sammy Watkins. Williams ran the ball in from the goal-line, increasing their lead to 34–24 after Harrison Butker missed the extra point. After forcing another Texans punt, the Chiefs took advantage of another pass interference penalty against Houston and a 28-yard completion from Mahomes to Kelce, scoring on their sixth straight possession with another Williams touchdown run to give them a 41–24 lead with 4:39 left in the quarter. Houston finally snapped Kansas City's 41-point run when Watson completed 4 passes for 80 yards and finished the drive with a 5-yard touchdown run, making the score 41–31 with 24 seconds left in the third quarter.

Kansas City would make it seven touchdowns in a row, setting a new postseason record, on a drive that included a 23-yard pass to Kelce and a 28-yard completion to Watkins, putting the ball at the Houston 8. Mahomes then found Blake Bell in the end zone, making the score 48–31. On Houston's next drive, they turned the ball over on downs at the Chiefs 42. A pair of runs by Williams for gains of 11 and 26 yard to set up Butker's 24-yard field goal with 8:06 left to put Kansas City up by 20. Houston then turned the ball over on downs on their final two possessions, the last coming when Frank Clark sacked Watson for a 17-yard loss on fourth-and-8 from the Kansas City 8-yard line.

Mahomes finished the game 23/35 for 321 yards and five touchdowns with no interceptions. He was also the leading rusher with 53 yards on seven carries. Kelce had 10 catches for 134 yards and three touchdowns, tying a Super Bowl-era postseason record. Hardman had six kickoff returns for 142 yards. Williams rushed for 47 yards, caught two passes for 21 yards, and scored three touchdowns. Watson threw for 388 yards and two touchdowns, while DeAndre Hopkins had 118 yards on nine catches. Kansas City's 24-point comeback was the fourth largest in postseason history. The Texans became the first team in NFL postseason history to lose by 20 or more points after leading by 20 or more points.

During the game, the Chiefs scored so many touchdowns that Arrowhead Stadium quickly ran out of touchdown fireworks.

==== NFC: Green Bay Packers 28, Seattle Seahawks 23 ====
Seattle Seahawks vs. Green Bay Packers – Game summary

| Quarter | 1 | 2 | 3 | 4 | Total |
|---|---|---|---|---|---|
| Seahawks | 3 | 0 | 14 | 6 | 23 |
| Packers | 7 | 14 | 7 | 0 | 28 |

at Lambeau Field, Green Bay, Wisconsin

- Date: January 12, 2020
- Game time: 3:40 p.m. PST/5:40 p.m. CST/6:40 p.m. EST
- Game weather: Cloudy, 23 °F (−5 °C)
- Game attendance: 78,998
- Referee: Clete Blakeman
- TV announcers (Fox): Joe Buck, Troy Aikman, Erin Andrews, Chris Myers and Mike Pereira
- Sources: ESPN.com and Pro-Football-Reference.com

Game information

First quarter

- GB – Davante Adams 20-yard pass from Aaron Rodgers (Mason Crosby kick), 10:37. Packers 7–0. Drive: 8 plays, 75 yards, 4:23.
- SEA – Jason Myers 45-yard field goal, 0:28. Packers 7–3. Drive: 6 plays, 32 yards, 1:38.

Second quarter

- GB – Aaron Jones 1-yard run (Mason Crosby kick), 9:49. Packers 14–3. Drive: 9 plays, 75 yards, 5:39.
- GB – Aaron Jones 1-yard run (Mason Crosby kick), 1:30. Packers 21–3. Drive: 11 plays, 60 yards, 4:13.

Third quarter

- SEA – Marshawn Lynch 1-yard run (Jason Myers kick), 9:44. Packers 21–10. Drive: 10 plays, 69 yards, 5:16.
- GB – Davante Adams 40-yard pass from Aaron Rodgers (Mason Crosby kick), 7:09. Packers 28–10. Drive: 5 plays, 75 yards, 2:35.
- SEA – Tyler Lockett 7-yard pass from Russell Wilson (Jason Myers kick), 0:39. Packers 28–17. Drive: 12 plays, 84 yards, 6:30.

Fourth quarter

- SEA – Marshawn Lynch 1-yard run (pass failed), 9:33. Packers 28–23. Drive: 9 plays, 79 yards, 4:28.

Seattle Seahawks stats

Passing

- Russell Wilson – 21/31, 277 yards, 1 touchdown

Rushing

- Marshawn Lynch – 12 rushes, 26 yards, 2 touchdowns
- Russell Wilson – 7 rushes, 64 yards
- Travis Homer – 3 rushes, 13 yards
- David Moore – 1 rush, 6 yards
- Luke Willson – 1 rush, 1 yards

Receiving

- Tyler Lockett – 9 receptions, 136 yards, 1 touchdown
- Jacob Hollister – 5 receptions, 47 yards
- DK Metcalf – 4 receptions, 59 yards
- Travis Homer – 2 receptions, 27 yards
- Luke Willson – 1 reception, 8 yards
Green Bay Packers stats

Passing

- Aaron Rodgers – 16/27, 243 yards, 2 touchdowns

Rushing

- Aaron Jones – 21 rushes, 62 yards, 2 touchdowns
- Arron Rodgers – 5 rushes, 14 yards
- Tyler Ervin – 2 rushes, 25 yards
- Allen Lazard – 1 rush, 5 yards
- Jamaal Williams – 1 rush, 5 yards

Receiving

- Davante Adams – 8 receptions, 160 yards, 2 touchdowns
- Jimmy Graham – 3 receptions, 49 yards
- Geronimo Allison – 1 reception, 11 yards
- Jamaal Williams – 1 reception, 9 yards
- Marquez Valdes-Scantling – 1 reception, 8 yards
- Aaron Jones – 1 reception, 4 yards
- Jace Sternberger – 1 reception, 2 yards

===== Background =====
Head coach Mike McCarthy was fired during the previous season after missing the playoffs in 2017 and leading the Green Bay Packers to a 4–7–1 in 2018. Joe Philbin took on interim head coaching duties and the Packers missed the playoffs in consecutive seasons for the first time since 2005 and 2006. After the season, the Packers hired Brian Gutekunst as the team's new general manager and Matt LaFleur as the new head coach. LaFleur led a resurgence in the career of quarterback Aaron Rodgers, leading the team to a record of 13–3, an NFC North title and good enough for the second seed in the playoffs. The San Francisco 49ers and New Orleans Saints also finished with 13–3 records; San Francisco beat the Packers and Saints in the regular season, giving them the first seed in the playoffs, while the Packers got the second seed over the Saints based on having a better conference record.

The Seattle Seahawks continued their steady form under head coach Pete Carroll, going 11–5 during the 2019 season, good enough for second in the NFC West and the fifth seed in the playoffs. The Seahawks started the season 10–2 before going 1–3 over their last four games. The Seahawks also went 10–2 in games decided by one score or less, but only achieved a point differential for the season of +7. Marshawn Lynch returned to the Seahawks prior to the last game of the regular season, after the team lost three running backs to injury. Lynch had retired in 2016 from the Seahawks, missed the 2016 NFL season, came out of retirement to play for the Las Vegas Raiders for two seasons and then retired again, missing most of the 2019 season before signing with the Seahawks. The Seahawks met the Philadelphia Eagles in the Wild Card round where they won 17–9. Their victory meant they would travel to Lambeau Field in Green Bay, Wisconsin, to play the Packers in the Divisional round of the playoffs. The Packers were favored to win the game by 4.5 points, which was to become the sixth straight season the teams played each other.

===== Game summary =====
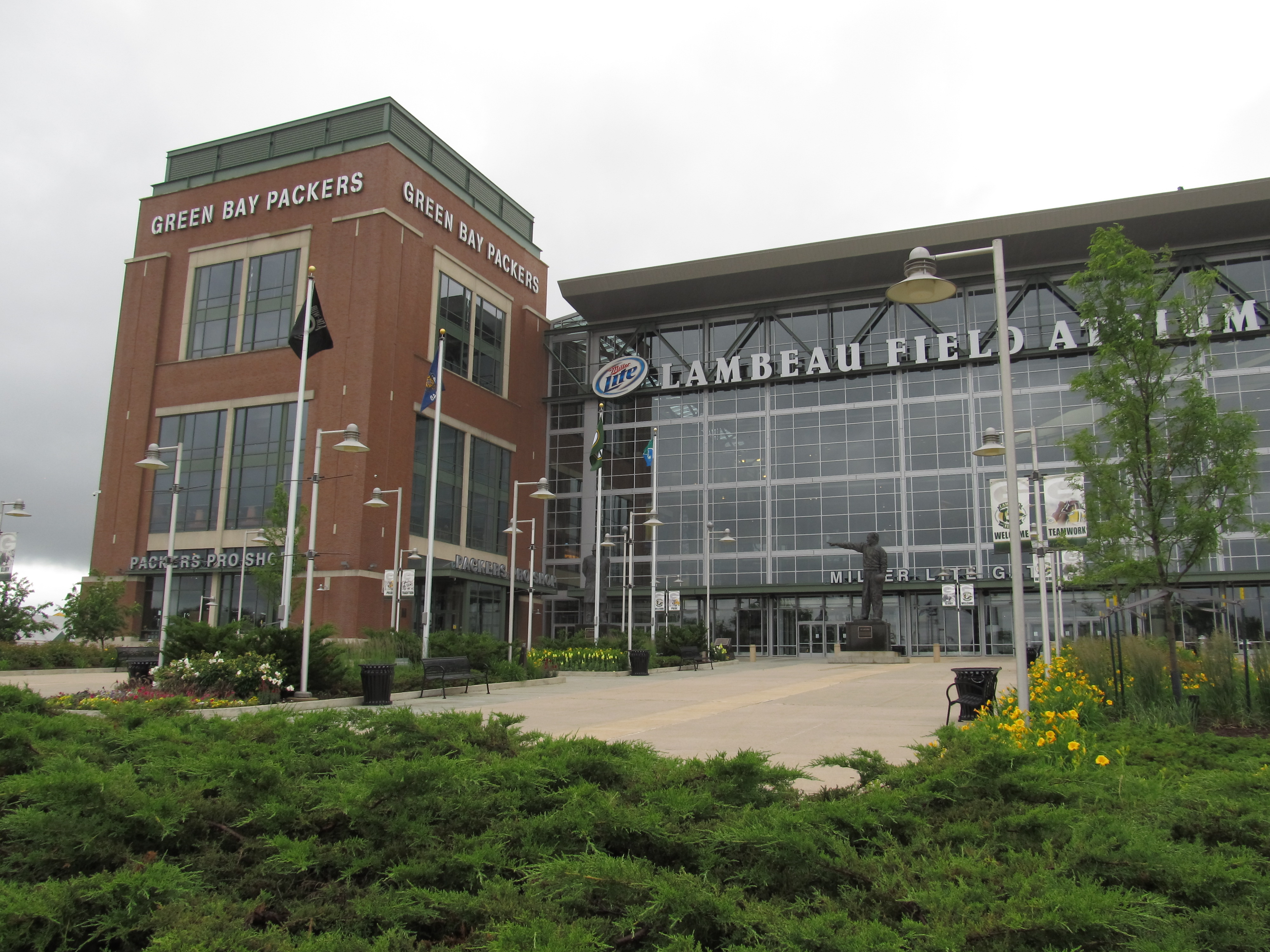
Lambeau Field, shown here in 2013, was the site of the playoff game between the Seahawks and Packers.

The Packers took an early 7–0 on their first drive of the game, going 75 yards in 8 plays. The drive ended in a 20-yard touchdown pass from Aaron Rodgers to Davante Adams. The Seahawks and Packers then exchanged two punts each before the Seahawks took a short drive for their first points of the game. Jason Myers kicked a 45-yard field goal to bring the score to 7–3. The Packers engineered another 75-yard drive, this time in 9 plays, that ended in a 1-yard touchdown run by Aaron Jones. Down 14–3, the Seahawks responded with a 50-yard drive, although Myers missed a 50-yard field goal attempt wide right. The Packers quickly turned around and drove down the field, with Jones scoring another one-yard touchdown run to give the Packers a 21–3 lead with just over a minute left in the first half. After the kick-of, the Seahawks drove to mid-field before the half ended.

The Seahawks started the second half with the ball and drove down 69 yards in 10 plays, with Lynch scoring on a 1-yard touchdown run to bring the score to 21−10. The Packers responded quickly, going 75 yards in 5 plays. Rodgers connected with Adams for their second touchdown pass, this time from 40 yards out, to increase the Packers lead to 28−10. The Seahawks got the ball back and engineered a long scoring drive, going 84 yards in 12 plays. After scrambling for a first down, Russell Wilson threw a touchdown pass to Tyler Lockett from seven yards out. With a 28−17 lead, the Packers got the ball back and went three-and-out, punting the ball back to the Seahawks. The Seahawks responded with another scoring drive, this one for 79 yards. Lynch scored his second rushing touchdown of the game, again from one-yard out. The Seahawks attempted a two-point conversion, which would have brought the score to within three points, but Wilson was sacked on the attempt. The Packers got the ball back with just under 10 minutes left in the game with a 28−23 lead. Although the Packers were able to run over four minutes off the clock on their drive, Rodgers took a sack on third down that forced a punt. On the ensuing drive, Wilson connected with Lockett for 14 yards but then after an incomplete pass and a short rush, Wilson was sacked on third down, forcing a punt. The Packers got the ball with two-and-half minutes left in the game. The Packers converted on two third down plays, forcing the Seahawks to use all their timeouts. Rodgers knelt on three consecutive plays to run out the remainder of the game clock and secure the victory for the Packers.

====== Analysis ======
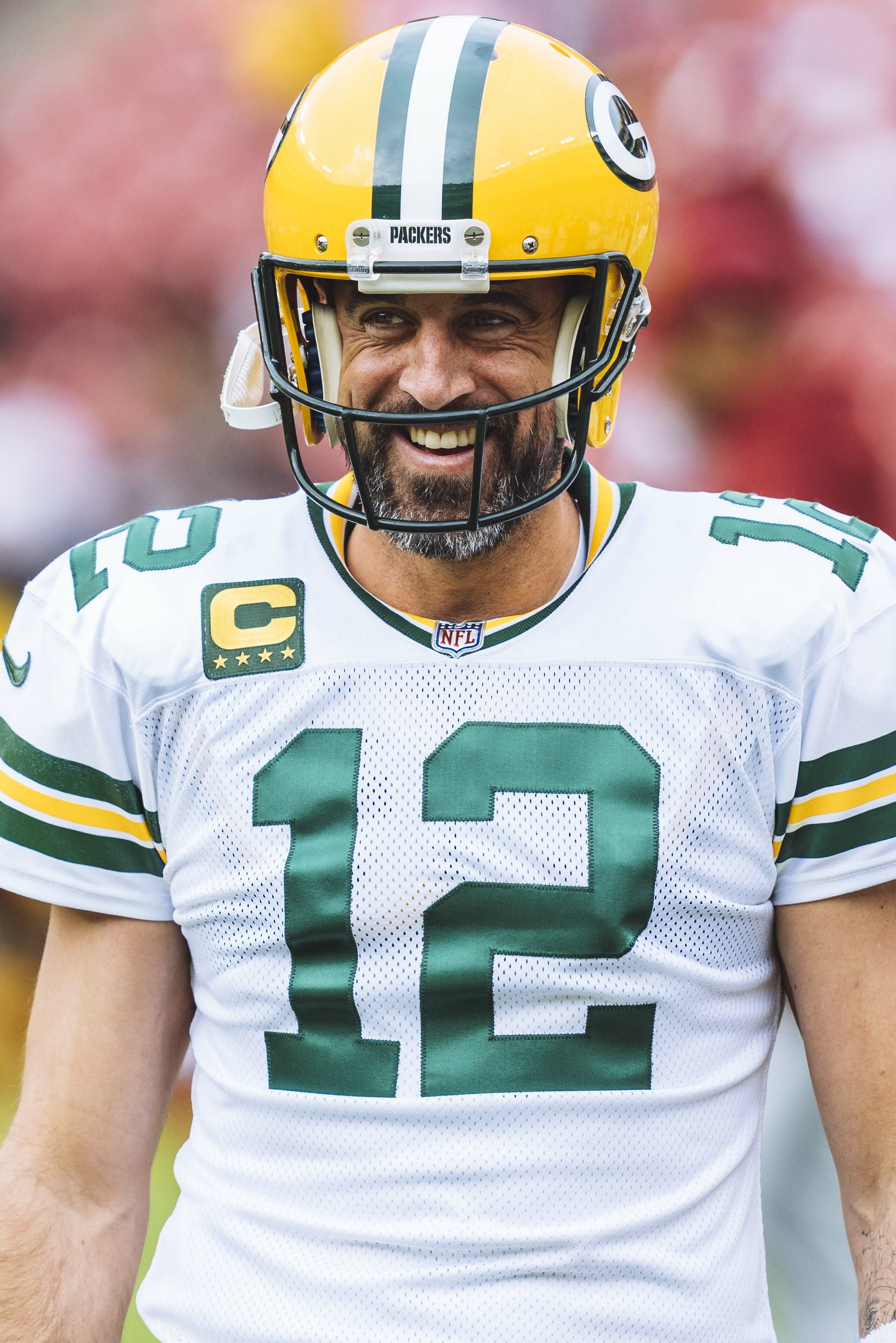
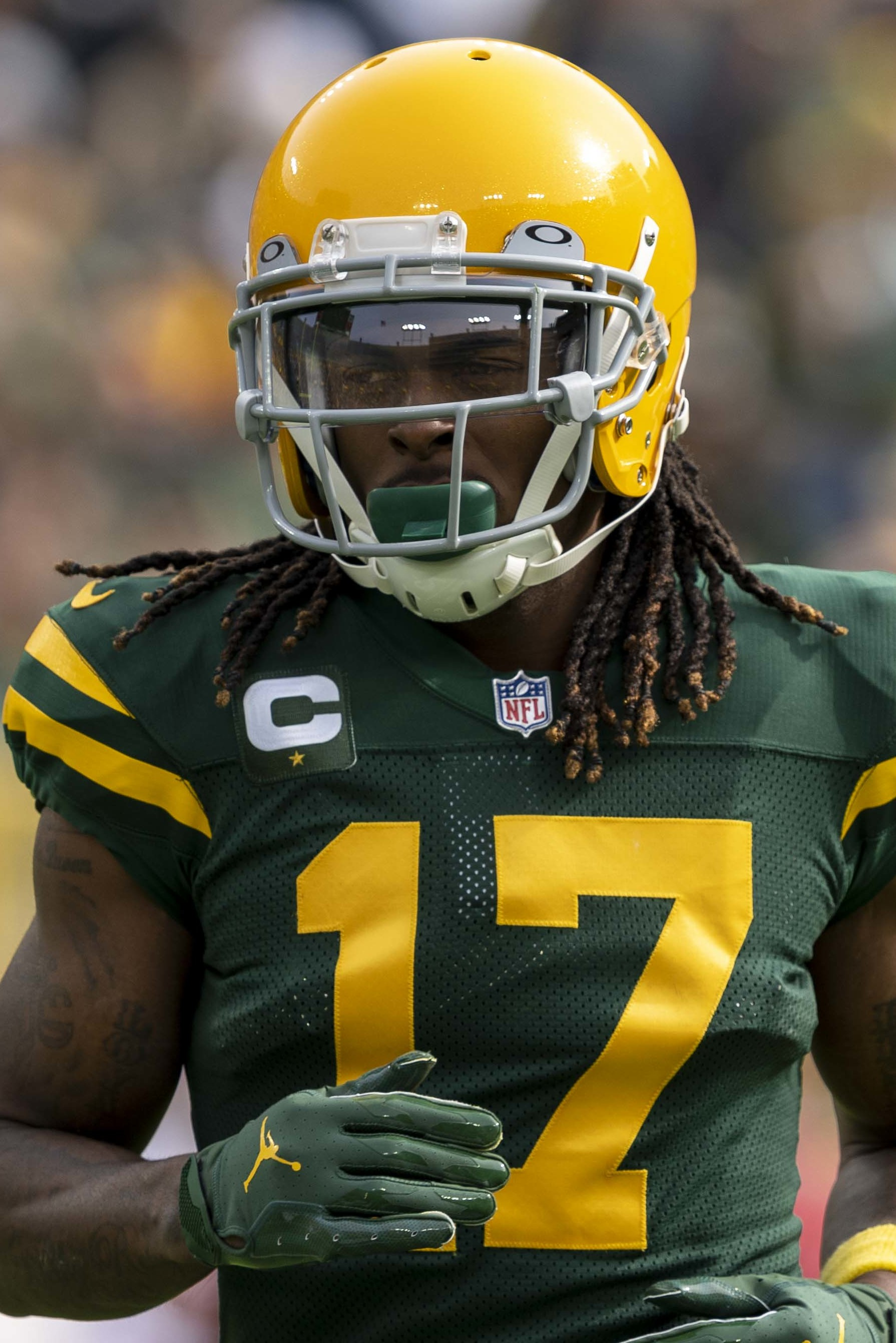
Aaron Rodgers (left) and Davante Adams (right) combined for eight receptions, 160 yards and 2 touchdowns during the game.

Post-game analysis centered on individual performances during the game, including Rodgers, Adams and Preston Smith on the Packers and Wilson on the Seahawks. Adams had a productive game, capturing eight receptions and 160 yards, with two touchdowns. Smith recorded a crucial sack with just a few minutes left in the fourth quarter that forced a Seattle punt, which led to the Packers' final drive and victory. Rodgers performance was punctuated by his two completions on third down on the last drive of the game, which secured the Packers victory. From a defensive perspective, Smith's sack was reflective of the entire game, where the Packers forced Wilson out of the pocket and provided him little time for plays to develop. Wilson led the Seahawks in both passing yards and rushing yards, while also throwing a passing touchdown. Wilson's rushing ability and his success in coming-from-behind in the second half were praised. The growing Packers–Seahawks rivalry was discussed, with some sources noting past games between the two teams, including the 2014 NFC Championship Game. The loss brought the Seahawks's losing streak at Lambeau Field to nine games; their last victory was on November 1, 1999.

===== Outcome =====
After their victory, the Packers were set to travel to Santa Clara, California, to play the San Francisco 49ers in the 2019 NFC Championship Game at Levi's Stadium. The Packers were shut out in the first half, with the 49ers taking a 27–0 lead into halftime. 49ers running back Raheem Mostert ran for 220 rushing yards and 4 touchdowns, with the Packers losing 37–20. The Packers and Seahawks would both return to the playoffs the next season, with the Seahawks losing to the Los Angeles Rams in the Wild Card round and the Packers losing to the eventual Super Bowl LV champion Tampa Bay Buccaneers in the 2020 NFC Championship Game. The Divisional playoff game continued a growing rivalry between the two teams, who met in the playoffs four times in 16 years up to that point.

== Conference championships ==
=== Sunday, January 19, 2020 ===
==== AFC: Kansas City Chiefs 35, Tennessee Titans 24 ====
Tennessee Titans vs. Kansas City Chiefs – Game summary

| Quarter | 1 | 2 | 3 | 4 | Total |
|---|---|---|---|---|---|
| Titans | 10 | 7 | 0 | 7 | 24 |
| Chiefs | 7 | 14 | 0 | 14 | 35 |

at Arrowhead Stadium, Kansas City, Missouri

- Date: January 19, 2020
- Game time: 2:05 p.m. CST/3:05 p.m. EST
- Game weather: Sunny, 17 °F (−8 °C)
- Game attendance: 73,656
- Referee: Tony Corrente (99)
- TV announcers (CBS): Jim Nantz, Tony Romo, Tracy Wolfson, Jay Feely and Gene Steratore
- Recap, Game Book

Game information

First quarter

- TEN – Greg Joseph 30-yard field goal, 11:29. Titans 3–0. Drive: 8 plays, 58 yards, 3:31.
- TEN – Derrick Henry 4-yard run (Greg Joseph kick), 5:52. Titans 10–0. Drive: 9 plays, 58 yards, 4:07.
- KC – Tyreek Hill 8-yard pass from Patrick Mahomes (Harrison Butker kick), 0:46. Titans 10–7. Drive: 10 plays, 74 yards, 5:06.

Second quarter

- TEN – Dennis Kelly 1-yard pass from Ryan Tannehill (Greg Joseph kick), 6:39. Titans 17–7. Drive: 15 plays, 75 yards, 9:07.
- KC – Tyreek Hill 20-yard pass from Patrick Mahomes (Harrison Butker kick), 4:03. Titans 17–14. Drive: 5 plays, 63 yards, 2:36.
- KC – Patrick Mahomes 27-yard run (Harrison Butker kick), 0:11. Chiefs 21–17. Drive: 9 plays, 86 yards, 1:40.

Third quarter

- No scoring plays.

Fourth quarter

- KC – Damien Williams 3-yard run (Harrison Butker kick), 14:50. Chiefs 28–17. Drive: 13 plays, 73 yards, 7:08.
- KC – Sammy Watkins 60-yard pass from Patrick Mahomes (Harrison Butker kick), 7:33. Chiefs 35–17. Drive: 7 plays, 88 yards, 4:21.
- TEN – Anthony Firkser 22-yard pass from Ryan Tannehill (Greg Joseph kick), 4:18. Chiefs 35–24. Drive: 8 plays, 80 yards, 3:15.

Top passers

- TEN – Ryan Tannehill – 21/31, 209 yards, 2 TD
- KC – Patrick Mahomes – 23/35, 294 yards, 3 TD

Top rushers

- TEN – Derrick Henry – 19 rushes, 69 yards, TD
- KC – Patrick Mahomes – 8 rushes, 53 yards, TD

Top receivers

- TEN – Corey Davis – 5 receptions, 65 yards
- KC – Sammy Watkins – 7 receptions, 114 yards, TD

This was the first AFC Championship game since 2011 not to feature the New England Patriots. It was also the first AFC Championship game since 2002, and only the third of the 21st century, not to feature Tom Brady, Peyton Manning, or Ben Roethlisberger as a starting quarterback.

For the second week in a row, Kansas City came back from a deficit to defeat a team that had beaten them in the regular season, this time recovering from an early 10–0 hole to earn their first Super Bowl appearance in 50 years. The Chiefs outgained Tennessee in total yards 404–295, while holding their explosive running back Derrick Henry to just 61 yards from scrimmage, with negative yardage in the second half.

Tennessee took the opening kickoff and converted Ryan Tannehill's 37-yard completion to A. J. Brown into a 30-yard field goal by Greg Joseph. Kansas City went three-and-out on their first drive, and Kalif Raymond returned their punt 9 yards to the Titans 42-yard line. Tennessee then drove 58 yards in 9 plays, including a 3-yard catch by Adam Humphries on fourth-and-2. On the next play, Tannehill completed a 22-yard pass to Jonnu Smith on the Chiefs 4-yard line. Then Henry took a snap from wildcat formation and ran into the end zone for a 4-yard score, giving Tennessee a 10–0 lead. This time the Chiefs were able to respond, driving 69 yards in 10 plays, the longest a 26-yard completion from Patrick Mahomes to Tyreek Hill. Hill's 8-yard touchdown catch on the last play made the score 10–7 with 51 seconds left in the first quarter.

The Titans struck back with a 15-play, 74-yard drive that took 9:07 off the clock. Tannehill finished the drive with a 1-yard touchdown pass to offensive tackle Dennis Kelly on a tackle-eligible play that put the team back up by 10 points. Mecole Hardman returned the ensuing kickoff 35 yards to his own 35-yard line. From there, Kansas City drove 65 yards in 5 plays, the longest a 24-yard completion from Mahomes to Demarcus Robinson. On the last play, Mahomes threw a 20-yard touchdown pass to Hill, cutting their deficit to 17–14. Then after a punt, Mahomes completed 4 passes for 41 yards and rushed for 7 before taking off for a 27-yard touchdown run in which he evaded five Titans players on the way to the end zone. This gave the Chiefs a 21–17 lead with 23 seconds left in the half.

After a pair of punts to start the second half, Kansas City drove 73 yards in 13 plays to go up 28–17 on Damien Williams' 3-yard touchdown run. On their next drive, the Chiefs put the game completely out of reach with Mahomes' 60-yard touchdown pass to Sammy Watkins, giving them a 35–17 lead with 7:44 left on the clock. Tennessee responded by driving 80 yards in 8 plays, including a fake punt in which punter Brett Kern threw a 28-yard pass to Amani Hooker. Tannehill finished the drive with a 22-yard touchdown pass to Anthony Firkser, making the final score 35–24, and sending the Chiefs to the Super Bowl for the first time since 1970.

Mahomes completed 23/35 passes for 294 yards and three touchdowns, while also leading Kansas City in rushing with eight carries for 53 yards and a score. Watkins caught seven passes for 114 yards and a touchdown. Tannehill completed 21/31 passes for 209 yards and two touchdowns, while also rushing for 11 yards.

==== NFC: San Francisco 49ers 37, Green Bay Packers 20 ====
Green Bay Packers vs. San Francisco 49ers – Game summary

| Quarter | 1 | 2 | 3 | 4 | Total |
|---|---|---|---|---|---|
| Packers | 0 | 0 | 7 | 13 | 20 |
| 49ers | 7 | 20 | 7 | 3 | 37 |

at Levi's Stadium, Santa Clara, California

- Date: January 19, 2020
- Game time: 3:40 p.m. PST/5:40 p.m. CST/6:40 p.m. EST
- Game weather: Cloudy, 58 °F (14 °C)
- Game attendance: 72,211
- Referee: John Hussey (35)
- TV announcers (Fox): Joe Buck, Troy Aikman, Erin Andrews, Chris Myers and Mike Pereira
- Recap, Game Book

Game information

First quarter

- SF – Raheem Mostert 36-yard run (Robbie Gould kick), 5:55. 49ers 7–0. Drive: 6 plays, 89 yards, 3:38.

Second quarter

- SF – Robbie Gould 54-yard field goal, 14:55. 49ers 10–0. Drive: 5 plays, 15 yards, 2:21.
- SF – Raheem Mostert 9-yard run (Robbie Gould kick), 9:12. 49ers 17–0. Drive: 6 plays, 37 yards, 3:20.
- SF – Robbie Gould 27-yard field goal, 1:57. 49ers 20–0. Drive: 8 plays, 66 yards, 3:42.
- SF – Raheem Mostert 18-yard run (Robbie Gould kick), 0:45. 49ers 27–0. Drive: 3 plays, 30 yards, 0:16.

Third quarter

- GB – Aaron Jones 9-yard pass from Aaron Rodgers (Mason Crosby kick), 8:44. 49ers 27–7. Drive: 11 plays, 75 yards, 6:16.
- SF – Raheem Mostert 22-yard run (Robbie Gould kick), 4:49. 49ers 34–7. Drive: 7 plays, 79 yards, 3:55.

Fourth quarter

- GB – Aaron Jones 1-yard run (pass failed), 14:35. 49ers 34–13. Drive: 10 plays, 75 yards, 5:14.
- GB – Jace Sternberger 8-yard pass from Aaron Rodgers (Mason Crosby kick), 8:13. 49ers 34–20. Drive: 7 plays, 92 yards, 3:12.
- SF – Robbie Gould 42-yard field goal, 3:31. 49ers 37–20. Drive: 10 plays, 49 yards, 4:42.

Top passers

- GB – Aaron Rodgers – 31/39, 326 yards, 2 TD, 2 INT
- SF – Jimmy Garoppolo – 6/8, 77 yards

Top rushers

- GB – Aaron Jones – 12 rushes, 56 yards, TD
- SF – Raheem Mostert – 29 rushes, 220 yards, 4 TD

Top receivers

- GB – Davante Adams – 9 receptions, 138 yards
- SF – Deebo Samuel – 2 receptions, 46 yards

San Francisco lost starting running back Tevin Coleman to injury for most of the game, but this proved to be a non-issue as Raheem Mostert ran wild over the Packers with a franchise record 220 rushing yards and four touchdowns, both the second highest totals in NFL postseason history.

On the 49ers second possession of the game, Jimmy Garoppolo completed a pair of passes to Deebo Samuel for gains of 16 and 30 yards before Mostert stormed into the end zone on a 36-yard touchdown run. Green Bay was soon forced to punt, and Richie James returned it 26 yards to the San Francisco 49-yard line, setting up Robbie Gould's 54-yard field goal to give the team a 10–0 lead.

In the second quarter, a sack by K'Waun Williams forced a fumble. Green Bay recovered the ball, but lost 10 yards and had to punt from their own 14. J. K. Scott's 23-yard kick gave the 49ers great field position on the Packers 37. San Francisco then drove 37 yards in 6 plays to take a 17–0 lead on Mostert's 9-yard touchdown run. The Packers responded with a drive to the 49ers 25-yard line, only to lose the ball when quarterback Aaron Rodgers fumbled a snap, which was recovered by San Francisco lineman DeForest Buckner. The 49ers went on to drive 60 yards in 8 plays, including a 34-yard burst from Mostert. Gould finished the drive with a 27-yard field goal, increasing the team's lead to 20–0 after the two minute warning. Then Rodgers threw a pass that was intercepted by Emmanuel Moseley, who returned it 9 yards to the Green Bay 30-yard line. Mostert then took the ball to the end zone with three straight carries, the last an 18-yard touchdown run that gave San Francisco a 27–0 lead with 16 seconds left in the second quarter.

Green Bay managed to cut the score to 27–7 on the opening drive of the second half, moving the ball 80 yards in 11 plays. Rogers completed 9/10 passes for 75 yards on the drive, the last a 9-yard touchdown throw to Aaron Jones. But the 49ers stormed right back, with a pair of runs by Samuel for gains of 11 and 32 yards aiding a seven-play, 79-yard drive that ended on Mostert's 22-yard touchdown run. This gave the 49ers a 34–7 lead with five minutes left in the third quarter. Green Bay responded by going 80 yards in 10 plays, including Rodgers' 4-yard pass to Allen Lazard on fourth-and-2, and a 42-yard completion from Rodgers to tight end Jimmy Graham. On the next play, Jones ran for a touchdown that made the score 34–13 after a failed two-point conversion attempt. Then after a punt, Rodgers completed a 65-yard pass to Davante Adams on the 49ers 22-yard line. Three plays later, his 8-yard touchdown pass to Jace Sternberger made the score 34–20 with just under six minutes left in the game. However, San Francisco crushed any hope of a comeback with their ensuing 10-play, 44-yard drive, starting with Garoppolo's 19-yard completion to George Kittle. Gould completed the scoring with a 42-yard field goal to put the 49ers up 37–20 with 3:36 to play, before Richard Sherman intercepted a pass from Rodgers that enabled San Francisco to run out the rest of the clock and earn the franchise's seventh trip to the Super Bowl.

Mostert had 29 carries for 220 yards and four touchdowns, along with two receptions for 9 yards. Garoppolo set an NFC championship record for fewest pass attempts, completing 6/8 passes for 77 yards. Williams had seven solo tackles and a sack. Rodgers completed 31/39 passes for 326 yards, two touchdowns and two interceptions. Adams had nine receptions for 138 yards. With the 49ers defeating the Packers, a potentially anticipated rematch of Super Bowl I was prevented.

== Super Bowl LIV: Kansas City Chiefs 31, San Francisco 49ers 20 ==
Super Bowl LIV – San Francisco 49ers vs. Kansas City Chiefs – Game summary

| Quarter | 1 | 2 | 3 | 4 | Total |
|---|---|---|---|---|---|
| 49ers | 3 | 7 | 10 | 0 | 20 |
| Chiefs | 7 | 3 | 0 | 21 | 31 |

at Hard Rock Stadium, Miami Gardens, Florida

- Date: February 2, 2020
- Game time: 3:30 p.m. PST/5:30 p.m. CST/6:30 p.m. EST
- Game weather: 64 °F (18 °C)
- Game attendance: 62,417
- Referee: Bill Vinovich (52)
- TV announcers (Fox): Joe Buck, Troy Aikman, Erin Andrews, Chris Myers, Mike Pereira and Dean Blandino
- Recap, Game Book

Game information

First quarter

- SF – Robbie Gould 38-yard field goal, 7:57. 49ers 3–0. Drive: 10 plays, 62 yards, 5:58.
- KC – Patrick Mahomes 1-yard run (Harrison Butker kick), 0:31. Chiefs 7–3. Drive: 15 plays, 75 yards, 7:26.

Second quarter

- KC – Harrison Butker 31-yard field goal, 9:32. Chiefs 10–3. Drive: 9 plays, 43 yards, 4:36.
- SF – Kyle Juszczyk 15-yard pass from Jimmy Garoppolo (Robbie Gould kick), 5:05. Tied 10–10. Drive: 7 plays, 80 yards, 4:27.

Third quarter

- SF – Robbie Gould 38-yard field goal, 9:29. 49ers 13–10. Drive: 9 plays, 60 yards, 5:31.
- SF – Raheem Mostert 1-yard run (Robbie Gould kick), 2:35. 49ers 20–10. Drive: 6 plays, 55 yards, 2:48.

Fourth quarter

- KC – Travis Kelce 1-yard pass from Patrick Mahomes (Harrison Butker kick), 6:13. 49ers 20–17. Drive: 10 plays, 83 yards, 2:40.
- KC – Damien Williams 5-yard pass from Patrick Mahomes (Harrison Butker kick), 2:44. Chiefs 24–20. Drive: 7 plays, 65 yards, 2:26.
- KC – Damien Williams 38-yard run (Harrison Butker kick), 1:12. Chiefs 31–20. Drive: 2 plays, 42 yards, 0:13.

Top passers

- SF – Jimmy Garoppolo – 20/31, 219 yards, TD, 2 INT
- KC – Patrick Mahomes – 26/42, 286 yards, 2 TD, 2 INT

Top rushers

- SF – Raheem Mostert – 12 rushes, 58 yards, TD
- KC – Damien Williams – 17 rushes, 104 yards, TD

Top receivers

- SF – Kendrick Bourne – 2 receptions, 42 yards
- KC – Tyreek Hill – 9 receptions, 105 yards

This was the first time the Chiefs and 49ers have faced each other in the Super Bowl. Their last regular season meeting ended in a 38–27 Chiefs victory at Arrowhead Stadium on September 23, 2018. The 49ers led the all-time series 7–6.

The teams traded a touchdown and a field goal in the first half, going into halftime tied 10–10. The 49ers took a 10-point lead in the third quarter. The Chiefs then went on to score 21 unanswered points in the final 7 minutes to win the Super Bowl 31–20.

== Television coverage ==
All playoff games are televised nationally on network television.

ESPN produced coverage of the Saturday afternoon Wild Card game for the sixth consecutive season, and ESPN simulcasted it on ABC for the fifth consecutive season. For the second straight season, NBC aired the late afternoon Sunday Wild Card game as a lead-in to its coverage of the Golden Globe Awards. CBS then televised one of the AFC Wild Card Games, and Fox had one of the NFC Wild Card games. Coverage of the NFC Divisional games were split between Fox and NBC. CBS had exclusive coverage of both AFC Divisional games and the AFC Championship Game. Fox had exclusive coverage of the NFC Championship Game and Super Bowl LIV.
