= Anthony Firkser =

American football player (born 1995)

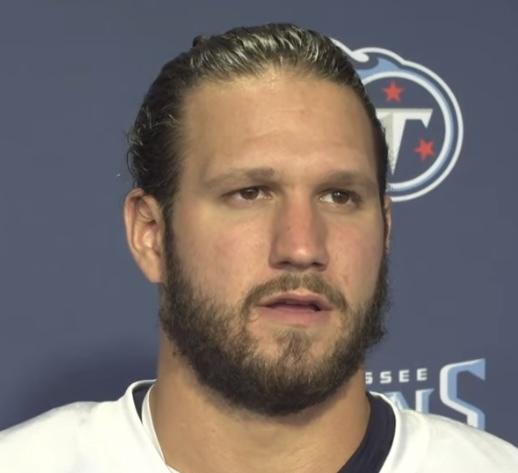
- Firkser in 2021

Profile
- Position: Tight end

Personal information
- Born: February 19, 1995 (age 31); Manalapan Township, New Jersey, U.S.
- Listed height: 6 ft 2 in (1.88 m)
- Listed weight: 241 lb (109 kg)

Career information
- High school: Manalapan
- College: Harvard (2013–2016)
- NFL draft: 2017: undrafted

Career history
- New York Jets (2017)*; Kansas City Chiefs (2017)*; Tennessee Titans (2018–2021); Atlanta Falcons (2022); New England Patriots (2023)*; Detroit Lions (2023); New York Jets (2024); Kansas City Chiefs (2024); Detroit Lions (2025); Washington Commanders (2026)*; Detroit Lions (2026)*
- * Offseason or practice squad member only

Awards and highlights
- First-team All-Ivy (2016); 2× second-team All-Ivy (2014, 2015)

Career NFL statistics as of 2025
- Receptions: 123
- Receiving yards: 1,260
- Receiving touchdowns: 5
- Stats at Pro Football Reference

Anthony Paul Firkser (born February 19, 1995) is an American professional football tight end. Firkser played college football for the Harvard Crimson. He signed with the New York Jets as an undrafted free agent in 2017 and has also played for several other NFL teams.

== Early life ==
Firkser was born in Englishtown, New Jersey, to Alex and Donna Firkser. He is Jewish, and he and his family belonged to Temple Shaari Emeth in Manalapan, where Firkser celebrated his bar mitzvah.

Firkser was a multi-sport athlete at Manalapan High School. In basketball, he played point guard, scoring 21.3 points with 7.6 assists per game. Firkser finished his career second in school history with 1,362 points. In his senior year, the Shore Basketball Coaches named Firkser the Shore Conference Co-Player of the Year. He was also named the Shore Conference ‘A’ North Division Offensive Player of the Year and made the all-state team.

Firkser competed at the 2013 Maccabiah Games in Israel as a guard for the 18-and-under gold medal-winning Team USA basketball team. On the team, he played alongside Spencer Weisz.

Firkser did not begin playing football until his sophomore year in high school. During Firkser's three-year high school career, the Manalapan football team went 30–6 and won three consecutive ‘A’ North Division titles. During one stretch, Manalapan had an 18-game winning streak within the division. After a semifinal visit in the state playoffs his sophomore year, Firkser and his teammates played for the NJSIAA Central Jersey title in his junior and senior years. While at Manalapan, Firkser set career school records in receptions (110), receiving yards (2,118) and touchdown receptions (19). After his senior year, Firkser was named All-Shore Offensive Player of the Year as a senior wide receiver. He was also a two-time All-Shore first-team selection.

== College career ==
Firkser was recruited by Harvard University and four other universities. Citing the university's academic program and the school's willingness to let him play both basketball and football, Firkser committed to play for coach Tim Murphy at Harvard on October 17, 2012.

Firkser saw his first collegiate action in 2014 as a sophomore. He appeared in 10 games for Harvard and made 32 catches for 485 yards. His four touchdown receptions tied for first on the team and he ranked second on the team in both catches and yards. After the season, Firkser was named to the All-Ivy League second-team. Firkser started nine games and caught 22 passes for 372 yards and three touchdowns in 2015 as a junior. For the second consecutive season, he was named to the All-Ivy League second-team. As a senior in 2016, Firkser started all 10 games for Harvard and made 45 receptions for 702 yards and seven touchdowns. He was named to the All-Ivy League first-team.

At the end of his collegiate career, Firkser ranked 12th all-time in school history in receptions, ninth all-time in receiving yards, and sixth all-time in touchdown receptions. He graduated from Harvard in 2017 with a degree in applied mathematics. During the 2018 offseason, Firkser participated in actuarial credential exams in hopes of potentially pursuing a post-football career as an actuary.

== Professional career ==
Coming into the 2017 NFL draft, scouting reports projected Firkser to best fit with a National Football League (NFL) team in a role of a fullback/tight end hybrid player. Scouts believed Firkser was tough, intelligent, and relatively athletic. Scouts also praised him for his ability to quickly get into pass routes and adjust to errant throws. However, scouts negatively viewed him as possessing just average size and questioned his strength as a blocker.

On March 19, 2017, Firkser participated in the Harvard Pro Day, an event at which Harvard football players demonstrate their skills to an audience of NFL scouts and coaches. Nearly half of the NFL teams attended this event.

Pre-draft measurables
Height	Weight	Arm length	Hand span	Wingspan	40-yard dash	10-yard split	20-yard split	20-yard shuttle	Three-cone drill	Vertical jump	Broad jump	Bench press
6 ft 1 5/8 in (1.87 m)	246 lb (112 kg)	31 1/4 in (0.79 m)	9 7/8 in (0.25 m)	6 ft 3 1/4 in (1.91 m)	4.82 s	1.69 s	2.70 s	4.29 s	7.06 s	31.5 in (0.80 m)	9 ft 2 in (2.79 m)	21 reps
All values from Pro Day

=== New York Jets ===
Firkser signed with the New York Jets as an undrafted free agent on May 5, 2017. He was waived by the Jets on September 2.

=== Kansas City Chiefs ===
On November 29, 2017, Firkser was signed to the practice squad of the Kansas City Chiefs. He signed a reserve/future contract with the Chiefs on January 8, 2018. Firkser was waived by Kansas City on April 30.

=== Tennessee Titans ===
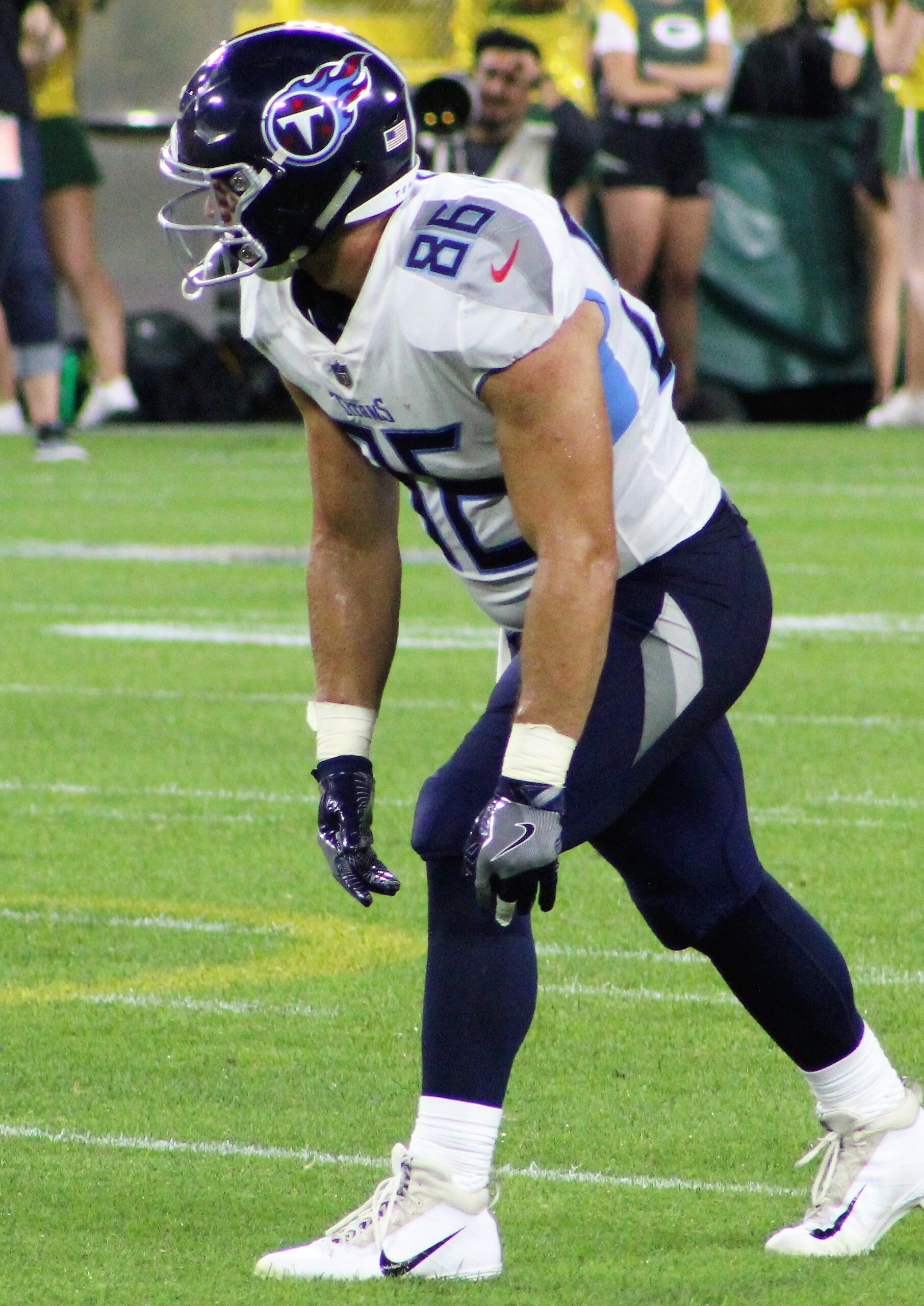
Firkser with the Tennessee Titans in 2018

==== 2018 season ====
On May 14, 2018, Firkser was signed by the Tennessee Titans. In the preseason, Firkser was second on the team in both receptions (10) and receiving yards (108). On September 1, he was named to the Titans' initial 53-man roster. He was waived by the Titans on September 17, and was re-signed to the practice squad the next day. He was promoted to the active roster on October 8. During Week 6, Firkser caught his first NFL reception in a 21–0 shoutout loss to the Baltimore Ravens. During a Week 13 26–22 victory over the New York Jets, Firkser scored his first NFL career touchdown on a 12-yard reception from Marcus Mariota. Firkser finished the 2018 season with 19 receptions for 225 yards and a touchdown.

==== 2019 season ====
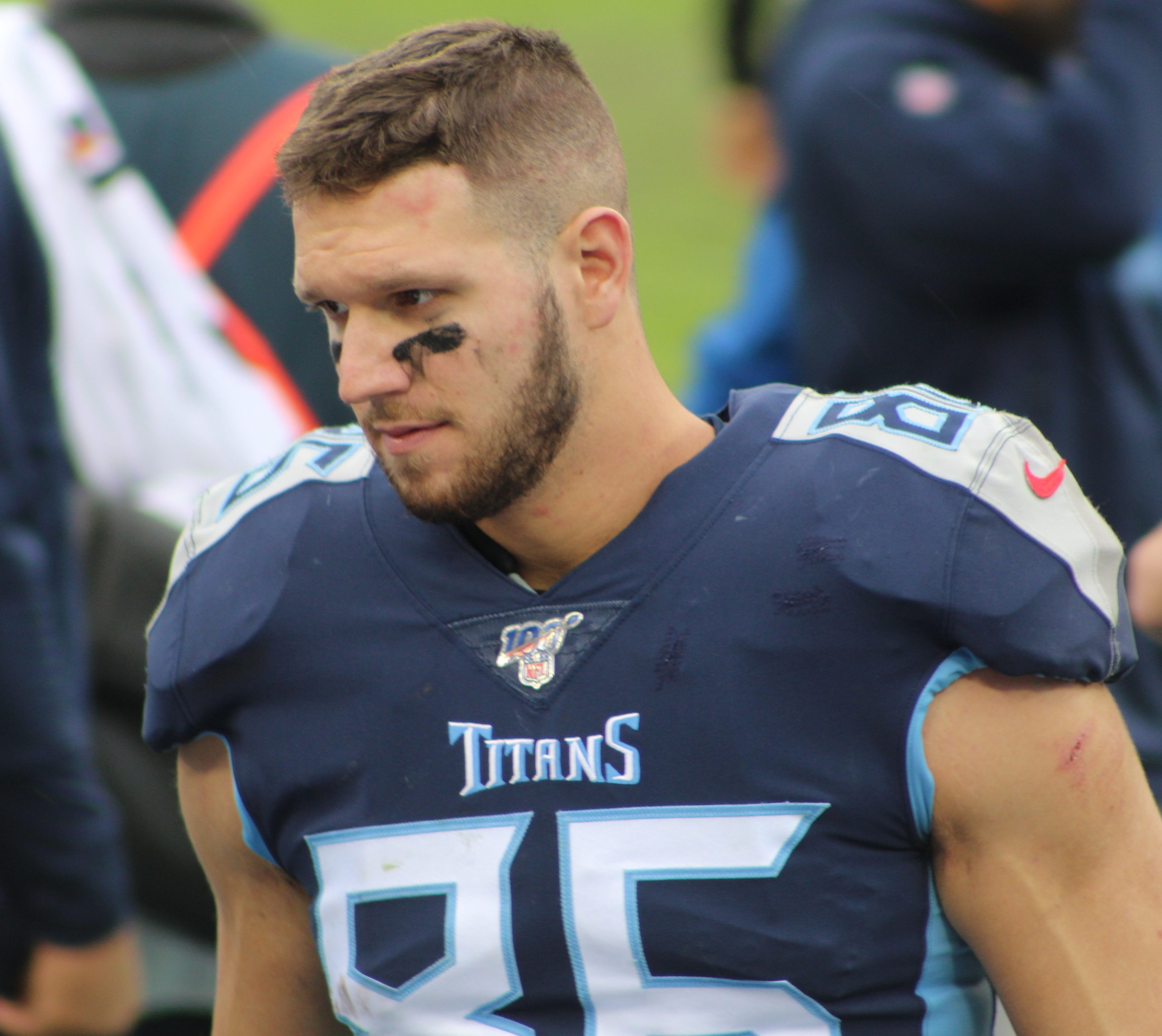
Firkser in 2019

Firkser began the season as one of four tight ends on the Titans' opening day roster along with veterans Delanie Walker, Jonnu Smith, and MyCole Pruitt. For the first six weeks of the regular season, Firkser played sparingly and was even a healthy inactive in Week 4. During that six-week span, he caught just one pass for 25 yards. After Walker was later placed on injured reserve, Firkser played a larger role in the Titans offense. During Week 10 against the Chiefs, he caught three receptions for 36 yards and his only touchdown of the regular season as the Titans won by a score of 35–32.

Firkser finished the 2019 season with 14 receptions for 204 yards and a touchdown. Ironically, Firkser's first two career touchdowns were against the Jets and Chiefs – the two teams that had previously waived him.

The Titans finished the regular season with a 9–7 record and were the sixth seed in the AFC playoffs. Firkser played his first postseason game on January 4, 2020, against the defending Super Bowl champions, the New England Patriots. In that game, he caught two passes for 23 yards and a touchdown in the Titans' 20–13 upset road victory in the Wild Card Round. With the touchdown, Firkser became the first player from Harvard to score a touchdown in an NFL postseason game. Firkser's final reception of the season was also the final touchdown of the Titans' 2019 season. He caught a 22-yard touchdown pass in the fourth quarter of the AFC Championship in a 35–24 road loss to the Chiefs.

==== 2020 season ====
On February 13, 2020, Firkser signed a one-year extension with the Titans.

During Week 6, Firkser recorded his first career 100-yard receiving game in a 42–36 overtime victory against the Houston Texans. Firkser finished the game catching eight of nine targets from Ryan Tannehill for 113 yards, and added a touchdown in the first quarter.

Firkser finished the 2020 season with 39 receptions for 387 yards and a touchdown. In the Wild Card Round of the playoffs, he caught two passes for 44 yards in a 20–13 loss to the Ravens.

==== 2021 season ====
On March 17, 2021, Firkser re-signed with the Titans on a one-year deal.

During Week 11 against the Houston Texans, Firkser scored his first touchdown of the season when he recovered a fumble in the end zone. He finished the 22–13 loss with five receptions for 26 yards and the aforementioned touchdown. During a Week 17 34–3 victory over the Miami Dolphins, Firkser caught three passes for 24 yards and his first receiving touchdown of the season. In the regular-season finale against the Houston Texans, Firkser had four receptions for 56 yards and a touchdown in the 28–25 road victory.

Firkser finished the 2021 season with 34 receptions for 291 yards and two touchdowns.

=== Atlanta Falcons ===
On April 12, 2022, Firkser signed a one-year deal with the Atlanta Falcons. He was released by the Falcons as a part of final roster cuts on August 30. Firkser was re-signed to the practice squad the following day. He was promoted to the active roster on September 13. In the 2022 season, he appeared in 11 games and started one, recording nine receptions for 100 yards.

=== New England Patriots ===
On May 25, 2023, Firkser signed with the New England Patriots. He was released by the Patriots on August 29.

=== Detroit Lions ===
On October 10, 2023, the Detroit Lions signed Firkser to their practice squad. He was promoted to the active roster on December 30. Firkser was released by the Lions on January 4, 2024 and re-signed to the practice squad, but was promoted back on January 13.

=== New York Jets (second stint) ===
On July 30, 2024, Firkser signed with the New York Jets. He was released by the Jets on August 27, and was subsequently re-signed to the team's practice squad. Firkser was promoted to the active roster on October 19. On October 31, the Jets released him.

=== Kansas City Chiefs (second stint) ===
On November 2, 2024, Firkser was signed to the Kansas City Chiefs' practice squad. He signed a reserve/future contract with the Chiefs on February 12, 2025. On May 1, Firkser was released by the Chiefs.

=== Detroit Lions (second stint) ===
On November 11, 2025, Firkser signed with the Detroit Lions' practice squad. He was promoted to the active roster on November 26. Firkser finished the 2025 season with eight receptions for 53 yards in seven games.

=== Washington Commanders ===
On June 2, 2026, Firkser signed with the Washington Commanders. On July 29, he was released by the Commanders.

=== Detroit Lions (third stint) ===
On July 31, 2026, Firkser signed with the Detroit Lions. He was placed on injured reserve on August 4. On August 10, Firkser was released with an injury settlement.

== Career statistics ==
=== NFL ===
==== Regular season ====
Year	Team	Games		Receiving					Fumbles	
Year	Team	GP	GS	Rec	Yds	Avg	Lng	TD	Fum	Lost
2018	TEN	12	0	19	225	11.8	28	1	0	0
2019	TEN	15	1	14	204	14.6	39	1	0	0
2020	TEN	16	1	39	387	9.9	45	1	0	0
2021	TEN	15	1	34	291	8.6	24	2	2	1
2022	ATL	11	1	9	100	11.1	22	0	0	0
2023	DET	2	0	0	0	0.0	0	0	0	0
2024	NYJ	4	0	0	0	0	0	0	0	0
2024	KC	3	0	0	0	0	0	0	0	0
2025	DET	7	4	8	53	6.6	18	0	0	0
Career		85	8	123	1,260	10.2	45	5	2	1

==== Postseason ====
Year	Team	Games		Receiving					Fumbles	
Year	Team	GP	GS	Rec	Yds	Avg	Lng	TD	Fum	Lost
2019	TEN	3	0	3	45	15.0	22T	2	0	0
2020	TEN	1	0	2	44	22.0	35	0	0	0
2021	TEN	1	0	0	0	0.0	0	0	0	0
2023	DET	3	0	1	8	8.0	8	0	0	0
Career		8	0	6	97	16.2	35	2	0	0

=== College ===
Season	Team	GP	Receiving					
Season	Team	GP	Rec	R/G	Yds	Y/G	Avg	TD
2014	Harvard	10	32	3.2	485	48.5	15.2	4
2015	Harvard	9	22	2.4	372	41.3	16.9	3
2016	Harvard	10	45	4.5	702	70.2	15.6	7
Career		29	99	3.4	1,559	53.8	15.7	14

== Personal life ==
Firkser's older brother, Josh, played football at Wagner.
