= Hovnanian Enterprises =

Real estate company in the United States

Hovnanian Enterprises Inc.
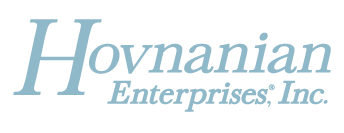
- Type: Public
- Traded as: NYSE: HOV (Class A); Russell 2000 Component
- Industry: Construction
- Founded: 1959; 61 years ago, 1967; 53 years ago
- Headquarters: Matawan, New Jersey, United States
- Key people: Kevork Hovnanian (Founder); Ara K. Hovnanian (Chairman President & CEO); Lou Smith (COO); J. Larry Sorsby (CFO & Executive VP)
- Products: Homes; Financial Services
- Revenue: ▲US$ 1.991 billion (2018)
- Operating income: ▲US$ 8.15 million (2018)
- Net income: ▲US$ 4.52 million (2018)
- Total assets: ▲US$ 1.662 billion (2018)
- Total equity: ▲US$ -453.50 million (2018)
- Number of employees: 1,851 (October 2018)
- Website: www.khov.com

Hovnanian Enterprises, Inc. is an American real estate company which is involved in every aspect of marketing homes, including design, construction and sales. The company works with individual detached housing as well as higher-occupancy dwellings, including townhouses, condominiums and retirement homes.

== Company operations ==
Hovnanian Enterprises, Inc. has delivered in excess of 336,000 houses since incorporation including 5,831 homes in fiscal 2018, with base prices ranging from $144,000 to $2,252,000 and averaging about $393,000. It operates in Arizona, California, Delaware, Florida, Georgia, Illinois, Maryland, New Jersey, Ohio, Pennsylvania, South Carolina, Texas, Virginia, and West Virginia. Members of the Hovnanian family, including Ara K. Hovnanian, have voting control more than 50% of the votes as of January 29, 2018 equivalent to a stake worth $178 million in 2015.

The company relocated its corporate headquarters to a new building on the banks of the Navesink River in Red Bank, New Jersey, in 2006.

In 2018 the corporate headquarters was relocated to Matawan, New Jersey. Also in 2018, Hovnanian moved to default on debts in a manufactured default deal with the Blackstone Group which would benefit through credit default swaps, in exchange for a sweetheart loan from Blackstone. In late May 2018, Blackstone abandoned the effort due to an admonishment from U.S. regulators.

== History ==
In 1959, Kevork Hovnanian, an ethnic Armenian originally from Iraq, and his three brothers, Hirair Hovnanian, Jirair Hovnanian and Vahak Hovnanian, each contributed $1,000, in addition to $20,000 which they borrowed, to found Hovnanian Enterprises, Inc. in a trailer in Toms River, New Jersey.

Hovnanian and his company earned a reputation to selling low cost condos and townhouses, many to first time young homeowners and families. A typical two-bedroom, two bathroom Hovnanian home built in the early 1980s cost approximately $30,000 because Hovnanian eliminated amenities such as communal swimming pools, which other builders used to attract potential buyers. In a New York Times interview in 1983, Hovnanian explained his reasoning for marketing low cost homes in developments without community amenities, "There are limited recreation facilities going in because people have little time for socialization."

In 1964 Jirair Hovnanian split off from his brothers' company and founded his own construction business, J.S. Hovnanian & Sons, of Mount Laurel Township, New Jersey. Hirair and Vahak also left the company by 1969 to found their own enterprises.

Hovnanian Enterprises had built and sold more than 30,000 homes and condos by 1989. An additional 200,000 residences were sold between 1989 and 2009, as the company expanded its construction to include luxury homes, mid-priced homes and retirement communities. It remains one of the United States' largest builders of "active adult homes", which are sold under the name of Four Seasons communities.

Kevork Hovnanian stepped down as president of Hovnanian Enterprises in 1989, and was succeeded by his son, Ara K. Hovnanian. He remained chief executive until his retirement in 1997, and was also replaced as CEO by Ara Hovnanian. However, he remained the chairman of the company's board of directors until his death in 2009.

== Quality ==
In 2005, Hovnanian acknowledged problems in a development in New Jersey after nearly three dozen homeowners turned to elected officials when their complaints were ignored.

The mortgage company was involved in a class action lawsuit filed in 2007 alleging violations of the Real Estate Settlement Procedures Act (RESPA) for removing incentives from home buyers if they opted to use another title insurance provider rather than the Hovnanian-affiliated title insurance company.

The company received numerous awards for construction quality in 2006 and 2007.

== Charity ==
- K. Hovnanian Children's Hospital was named after builder Kevork Hovnanian after his foundation contributed the "largest donation the hospital had seen in its 101 year history."
- Ocean Medical Center expanded in 2013 when it began an $82 million expansion project to substantially increase the capacity of its emergency room facilities and add additional basement and third floor space, funded in part by the family of Kevork Hovnanian who donated $5 million to the cause.
