= Jirair Hovnanian =

American home builder

Jirair S. Hovnanian
- Born: June 9, 1927; Kirkuk, Iraq
- Died: August 14, 2007 (aged 80); Marlton, New Jersey, U.S.
- Resting place: Cinnaminson, New Jersey
- Education: Wharton School (BS); Stanford Graduate School of Business (MBA)
- Known for: Founder of CANDLE
- Relatives: Kevork Hovnanian (brother)
- Awards: Ellis Island Medal of Honor (2006)

Jirair S. Hovnanian (June 9, 1927 – August 14, 2007) was an American home builder of Armenian descent based in New Jersey. Hovnanian's business developed and built over 6,000 houses throughout South Jersey.

== Early life ==
Hovnanian was born in Kirkuk, Iraq. His parents, who were ethnic Armenians had fled to Iraq in 1915 to escape the Armenian genocide. Jirair's father was from Sebastia and his mother was from Malatia. Hovnanian's father, Stepan K. Hovnanian, owned and operated a construction company based in Baghdad. Hovnanian was one of six children in his family. He attended a Jesuit high school in Kirkuk. The Hovnanian family, including Jirair, emigrated to the United States in 1948. The Hovnanians spoke very little English when they arrived in the US. The family settled in North Philadelphia. Jirair graduated from the Wharton School of Business in 1952 with a bachelor's degree in business. He also holds an MBA from Stanford Business School.

== Marriage ==
Jirair Hovnanian married Elizabeth Vosbikian, whose family founded the Quickie Manufacturing Corporation, which manufactured popular products such as the Quickie broom and mops.

== Career ==
Jirair and his three brothers founded a family construction company, Hovnanian Brothers Corp, in 1959. In 1964, Jirair split off from his brothers' company and founded his own construction business, J.S. Hovnanian & Sons, in Mount Laurel Township, New Jersey. Over the next 40 years, the company would operate throughout South Jersey, mainly in Burlington, Camden, and Gloucester counties. One of Jirair's brothers, Kevork, later founded Hovnanian Enterprises, Inc, a publicly traded firm based in Red Bank, New Jersey. The brothers' companies are not related professionally. Jirair championed New Jersey state laws in the 1970s to protect home buyers from unscrupulous builders and realtors. The laws later enacted included the Municipal Land Use Law, the 10 year Home Owner's Warranty Program, and the Uniform Construction Code.

Hovnanian and his firm, J.S. Hovnanian & Sons, had participated in the ABC reality show, Extreme Makeover: Home Edition, and completed the project just 10 days before his death in August 2007. Hovnanian's company built a home for free in Pennsauken, New Jersey, for the Marrero family, which was made up of Victor Marrero and his five sons. The home, which was built in just 96 hours, was completed for the show and the Marrero family, on August 4, 2007. Hovnanian's family later told the Philadelphia Inquirer that participating in the show was one of his dreams. Victor Marrero, the recipient of the episode's new home built by Hovnanian, told the newspaper following Hovnanian's death, "Mr. Hovnanian gave me and my sons a lifeline. I will love him all my life. He was quiet and always in the back. He was not a showoff. He told me 'I know you and your boys will be all right.' He threw so much love at me."

Jirair Hovnanian served as president of the New Jersey Builders Association and the lifelong director of the National Association of Home Builders.

== Interests ==
Jirair Hovnanian participated in a number of personal interest and philanthropic causes throughout his life. He was an avid sport fisherman. In August 1992 he and four others survived the sinking of his 127-foot-long (39 m) mega yacht, Lady Anna 90 miles (140 km) east-southeast off Cape May, New Jersey. Hovnanian and two scientists teamed up to found Nature's Wonder, a Philadelphia metropolitan area company that extracts a product from peat that encourages plant growth. Hovnanian was, himself, a champion grower of roses.

Hovnanian founded the Center for the Advancement of Natural Discoveries using Light Emission (CANDLE) in Armenia, his family's homeland before his parents fled to Iraq. The center, which is located in Yerevan, Armenia, "generates beams of ultraviolet light for protein crystallography." It helps to employ Armenian scientists who would otherwise have to move abroad to find work. He received the Ellis Island Medal of Honor in 2006 from the National Ethnic Coalition of Organizations, Inc.

== Death ==
Hovnanian suffered heart failure at his home in Mount Laurel Township, New Jersey and was pronounced dead at Virtua West Jersey Hospital in Marlton, New Jersey ten days after completing the episode of Extreme Makeover: Home Edition. He was 80 years old. His funeral was held at St. Gregory's Armenian Apostolic Church in Philadelphia, Pennsylvania and he was interred in Cinnaminson, New Jersey. He was survived by his immediate family, i.e. his widow, Elizabeth; their sons, Stephen and Peter and Jirair's three brothers and two sisters.
