= Kevork Hovnanian =

Armenian-American businessman and home builder (1923-2009)

- Born: 1923; Kirkuk, Mandatory Iraq
- Died: 24 September 2009 (aged 85–86); New York City, U.S.
- Known for: Philanthropy

Kevork S. Hovnanian (1923 – September 24, 2009) was an Armenian-American businessman and home builder, who founded Hovnanian Enterprises in 1959. He remained the president and chief executive officer of Hovnanian Enterprises until his retirement in 1997. Despite some financial difficulties due to the 2008-2009 recession and financial crisis, Hovnanian Enterprises was the sixth largest American homebuilder and the largest homebuilder in New Jersey, as of September 2009.

== Biography ==
Kevork Hovnanian was born in Kirkuk, present-day Iraq, in 1923. He was the oldest of four sons born to Stepan K. Hovnanian, an Armenian refugee from the Ottoman Empire's Armenian genocide who had settled in Iraq where he operated a construction business in Kirkuk which held contracts with oil companies in the region.

=== Career ===
Hovnanian took over the family's construction business after his father became ill. The company eventually employed more than 12,000 people in Iraq. However, Hovnanian fled to the United States in the aftermath of the 1958 Iraqi Revolution, which overthrew the monarchy of Faisal II of Iraq. Most of his family also moved to the United States.

In 1959, Kevork and his three brothers (Hirair Hovnanian, Jirair Hovnanian and Vahak Hovnanian) each contributed $1,000, in addition to $20,000 which they borrowed from Peter S. Vosbikian, to found Hovnanian Enterprises, Inc. in a trailer in Toms River, New Jersey. Hirair, Jirair and Vahak left the company by 1969 to found their own enterprises. Hovnanian and his company earned a reputation for selling low cost condos and townhouses, many to first time young homeowners and families. A typical two-bedroom, two bathroom Hovnanian home built in the early 1980s cost approximately $30,000 because Hovnanian eliminated amenities such as communal swimming pools, which other builders used to attract potential buyers. In a New York Times interview in 1983, Hovnanian explained his reasoning for marketing low cost homes in developments without community amenities, "There are limited recreation facilities going in because people have little time for socialization."

Hovnanian Enterprises had built and sold more than 30,000 homes and condos by 1989. An additional 200,000 residences were sold between 1989 and 2009, as the company expanded its construction to include luxury homes, mid-priced homes and retirement communities. It remains one the United States' largest builders of "active adult homes", which are sold under the name of Four Seasons communities.

Kevork Hovnanian stepped down as president of Hovnanian Enterprises in 1989, and was succeeded by his son, Ara K. Hovnanian. He remained chief executive until his retirement in 1997, and was also replaced as CEO by Ara Hovnanian. However, he remained the chairman of the company's board of directors until his death in 2009.

The company relocated its corporate headquarters to a new building on the banks of the Navesink River in Red Bank, New Jersey, in 2006.

=== Philanthropy ===
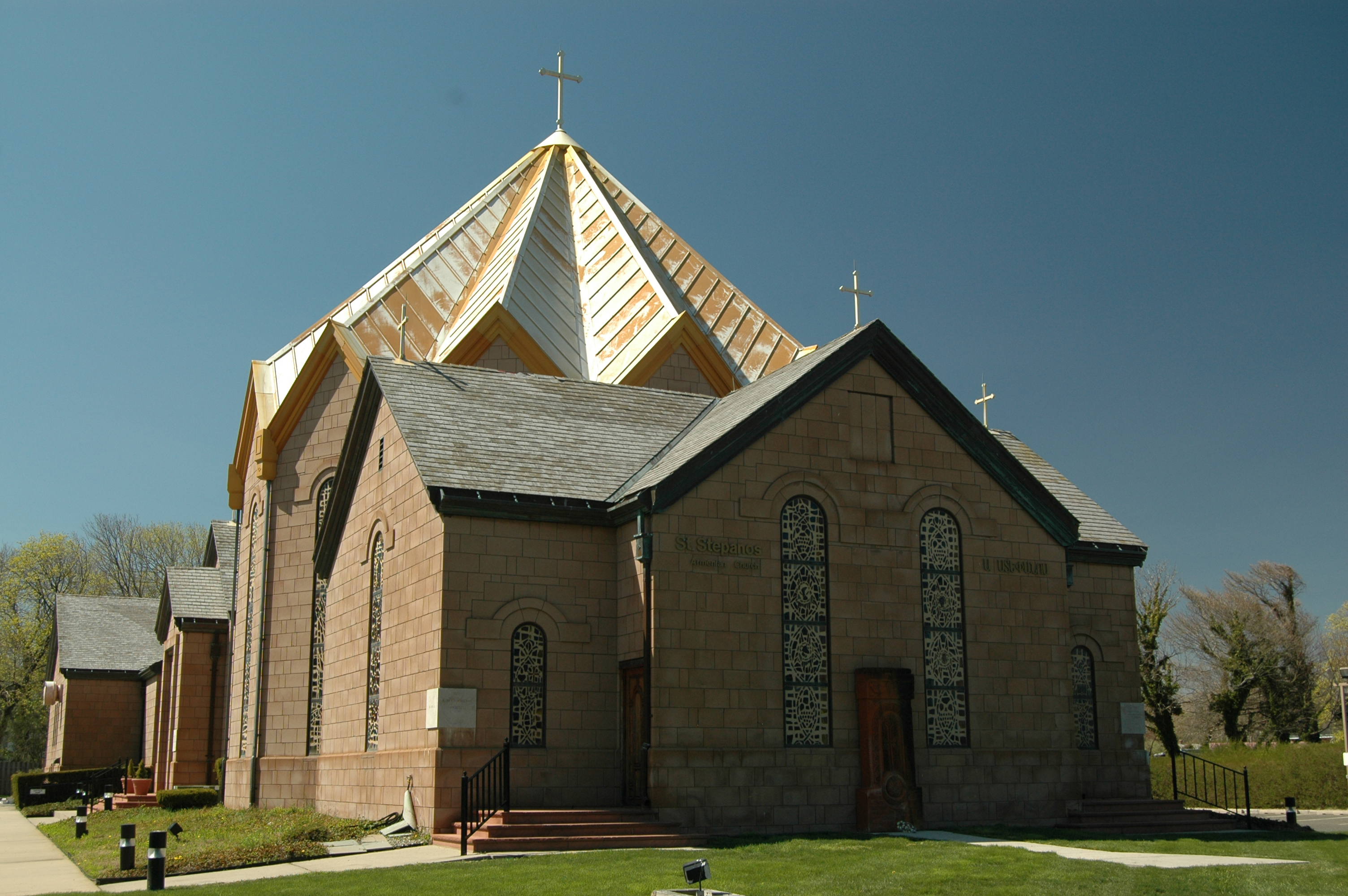
Hovnanian helped to construct St. Stepanos Armenian Church in the Elberon, New Jersey in memory of his mother.

Hovnanian left a number of philanthropic contributions during his life, especially in support of New Jersey, Armenia and the Armenian diaspora. Much the focus of his philanthropy focused on medical facilities and hospitals. His contributions included the K. Hovnanian Pavilion at the Alton A. Hovnanian Emergency Care Center at Riverview Medical Center in Red Bank and the K. Hovnanian Children's Hospital at Jersey Shore University Medical Center in Neptune, New Jersey. He also contributed donations to New York Presbyterian Hospital in New York City, which honored its benefactor by naming its cardiology practice unit for the K. Hovnanian family.

Hovnanian donated a townhouse in New York City for use as the official Armenian Mission to the United Nations. Hovnanian also constructed homes for earthquake victims in Armenia.

In 1986, Hovnanian constructed the St. Stepanos Armenian Church in the Elberon section of Long Branch in honor of his mother. The construction of the church fulfilled a promise he had made to himself when he left Iraq in the late-1950s.

=== Later life ===
Hovnanian resided in Rumson, New Jersey.

Kevork Hovnanian died on September 24, 2009, at New York Presbyterian Hospital in New York City at the age of 86. His memorial service was held at St. Vartan Cathedral in Manhattan on October 3, 2009. The service was presided over by Archbishop Khajag Barsamian.

== Legacy ==
The president of the New Jersey Builders Association, Michael H. Karmatz, called Hovnanian an "industry vanguard" following his death.
