= 2015 Tampa Bay Buccaneers season =

40th season in team history

- Owner: The Glazer family
- General manager: Jason Licht
- Head coach: Lovie Smith
- Home stadium: Raymond James Stadium

Results
- Record: 6–10
- Division place: 4th NFC South
- Playoffs: Did not qualify
- Pro Bowlers: RB Doug Martin; DT Gerald McCoy; OLB Lavonte David; OG Logan Mankins; QB Jameis Winston

Uniform
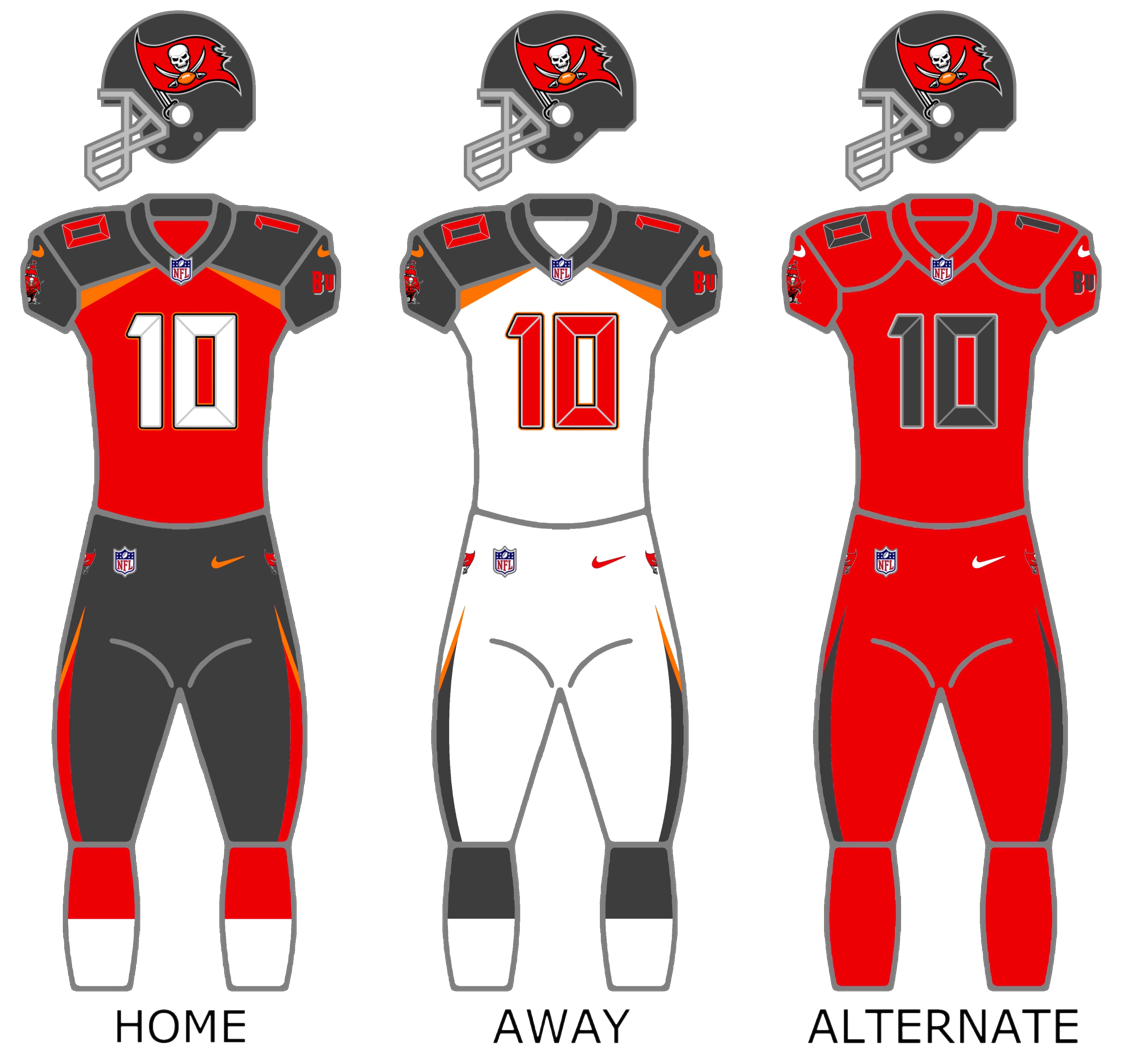

The 2015 season was the Tampa Bay Buccaneers' 40th in the National Football League (NFL), and their second and final season under head coach Lovie Smith. The offseason was marked by the draft selection of All-American Florida State quarterback Jameis Winston first overall in the 2015 NFL draft. The team wore a patch to commemorate the club's 40th season.

After their Week 8 overtime win at the Atlanta Falcons, the Buccaneers had already improved on their record from 2014 (2–14). Entering the month of December, Tampa Bay had just swept division rival Atlanta, avenging an ugly 56–14 defeat on TNF a year earlier. The team found themselves mathematically in the hunt for a playoff berth with a 6–6 record. Despite showing improvement, the Buccaneers lost their final four games of the season. They finished 6–10 and last in the NFC South for the fifth straight year.

Despite missing the playoffs, Doug Martin finished second in the league in rushing yards (just 82 yards shy of Adrian Peterson), and the franchise had their first ever season finishing in the top five in total offense. Winston, who started all 16 games, was voted the Pepsi NFL Rookie of the Year. On the defense side, the Buccaneers made improvements, ranking in the top ten in total yards and points allowed.

On January 6, 2016, Lovie Smith was fired after two seasons as head coach.

== 2015 draft class ==
2015 Tampa Bay Buccaneers draft
Round	Selection	Player	Position	College
1	1	Jameis Winston	QB	Florida State
2	34	Donovan Smith	OT	Penn State
2	61	Ali Marpet	G	Hobart
4	124	Kwon Alexander	LB	LSU
5	162	Kenny Bell	WR	Nebraska
6	184	Kaelin Clay	WR	Utah
7	231	Joey Iosefa	FB	Hawaii

Notes

- The Buccaneers acquired additional selections in the fourth- and sixth-rounds (Nos. 109 and 184 overall, respectively) in a trade that sent safety Mark Barron to the St. Louis Rams.
- The Buccaneers traded their original fourth- and sixth-round selections (Nos. 101 and 178 overall, respectively) and tight end Tim Wright to the New England Patriots in exchange for guard Logan Mankins and the Patriots' fifth-round selection (No. 168 overall).
- The Buccaneers acquired an additional fifth-round selection (No. 162 overall) in a trade that sent guard/center Jeremy Zuttah to the Baltimore Ravens.
- The Buccaneers traded their original fifth-round selection (No. 137 overall), along with a 2014 seventh-round selection to the Buffalo Bills in exchange for the Bills' 2014 fifth-round selection during the third day of the 2014 NFL draft.
- The Buccaneers acquired an additional seventh-round selection (No. 231 overall) and in addition with defensive end George Johnson from the Detroit Lions in exchange for the fifth-round selection (No. 168 overall) that was acquired from the Patriots.

== Staff ==
2015 Tampa Bay Buccaneers staff
Front office: Owner/president – Estate of Malcolm Glazer; Co-chairman – Bryan Glazer; Co-chairman – Edward Glazer; Co-chairman – Joel Glazer; General manager – Jason Licht; Director of player personnel – Jon Robinson; Director of football operations – Shelton Quarles; Director of pro scouting – Rob McCartney; Director of football administration – Mike Greenberg; Head coaches: Head coach – Lovie Smith; Offensive coaches: Offensive coordinator – Dirk Koetter; Quarterbacks – Mike Bajakian; Running backs – Tim Spencer; Wide receivers – Andrew Hayes-Stoker; Tight ends – Jon Embree; Offensive line – George Warhop; Assistant offensive line – Butch Barry; Offensive quality control – Ben Steele	Defensive coaches: Defensive coordinator – Leslie Frazier; Defensive line – Joe Cullen; Assistant defensive line – Paul Spicer; Linebackers – Hardy Nickerson; Cornerbacks – Gill Byrd, Larry Marmie; Safeties – Mikal Smith; Defensive quality control – Dave Borgonzi; Senior defensive assistant – Vacant; Special teams coaches: Special teams coordinator – Kevin O'Dea; Assistant special teams – Carlos Polk

== Final roster ==
2015 Tampa Bay Buccaneers roster
Quarterbacks (QB): 8 Mike Glennon; 4 Ryan Griffin; 3 Jameis Winston; Running backs (RB): 25 Mike James; 46 Jorvorskie Lane FB; 22 Doug Martin; 43 Bobby Rainey; 34 Charles Sims; Wide receivers (WR): 17 Donteea Dye; 13 Mike Evans; 11 Adam Humphries; 89 Russell Shepard; 85 Evan Spencer; Tight ends (TE): 84 Cameron Brate; 82 Brandon Myers; 87 Austin Seferian-Jenkins; 88 Luke Stocker; 81 Tevin Westbrook	Offensive linemen (OL): 78 Gosder Cherilus T; 69 Demar Dotson T; 68 Joe Hawley C; 70 Logan Mankins G; 74 Ali Marpet G; 64 Kevin Pamphile G; 76 Donovan Smith T; 62 Evan Smith C; Defensive linemen (DL): 91 Da'Quan Bowers DE; 92 William Gholston DE; 94 George Johnson DE; 95 Howard Jones DE; 93 Gerald McCoy DT; 77 Tony McDaniel DT; 90 Henry Melton DT; 56 Jacquies Smith DE	Linebackers (LB): 59 Kourtnei Brown OLB; 50 Bruce Carter MLB; 54 Lavonte David OLB; 49 Darius Eubanks OLB; 52 Jeremiah George OLB; 53 Adarius Glanton MLB; 57 Josh Keyes OLB; 51 Danny Lansanah OLB; Defensive backs (DB): 38 Jude Adjei-Barimah CB; 27 Johnthan Banks CB; 24 Mike Jenkins CB; 30 Bradley McDougald FS; 33 Kimario McFadden FS; 26 Sterling Moore CB; 37 Keith Tandy SS; 21 Alterraun Verner CB; Special teams (ST): 10 Connor Barth K; 48 Andrew DePaola LS; 5 Jake Schum P	Practice squad: 61 Josh Allen C; 14 Andre Davis WR; 67 Antoine Everett G; 72 Ben Gottschalk C; 28 Gerod Holliman FS; 71 Martin Ifedi DE; 75 Derrick Lott DT; 71 Ronald Powell DE (PS/I); 29 C. J. Roberts CB; 32 Joel Ross CB; Reserve: 58 Kwon Alexander MLB (Susp.); 80 Kenny Bell WR (IR); 23 Chris Conte SS (IR); 57 Larry English DE (IR); 96 T. J. Fatinikun DE (IR); 72 Garrett Gilkey G (PUP); 83 Vincent Jackson WR (IR); 98 Clinton McDonald DT (IR); 18 Louis Murphy WR (IR); 7 Patrick Murray K (IR); 97 Akeem Spence DT (IR); 31 Major Wright FS (IR); Rookies in italics 53 active, 13 reserve, 9 practice squad

== Schedule ==
=== Preseason ===
Week	Date	Opponent	Result	Record	Venue	Recap
1	August 15	at Minnesota Vikings	**L** 16–26	0–1	TCF Bank Stadium	Recap
2	August 24	Cincinnati Bengals	**W** 25–11	1–1	Raymond James Stadium	Recap
3	August 29	Cleveland Browns	**L** 7–31	1–2	Raymond James Stadium	Recap
4	September 3	at Miami Dolphins	**W** 22–17	2–2	Sun Life Stadium	Recap

=== Regular season ===
Week	Date	Opponent	Result	Record	Venue	Recap
1	September 13	Tennessee Titans	**L** 14–42	0–1	Raymond James Stadium	Recap
2	September 20	at **New Orleans Saints**	**W** 26–19	1–1	Mercedes-Benz Superdome	Recap
3	September 27	at Houston Texans	**L** 9–19	1–2	NRG Stadium	Recap
4	October 4	**Carolina Panthers**	**L** 23–37	1–3	Raymond James Stadium	Recap
5	October 11	Jacksonville Jaguars	**W** 38–31	2–3	Raymond James Stadium	Recap
6	Bye					
7	October 25	at Washington Redskins	**L** 30–31	2–4	FedExField	Recap
8	November 1	at **Atlanta Falcons**	**W** 23–20 (OT)	3–4	Georgia Dome	Recap
9	November 8	New York Giants	**L** 18–32	3–5	Raymond James Stadium	Recap
10	November 15	Dallas Cowboys	**W** 10–6	4–5	Raymond James Stadium	Recap
11	November 22	at Philadelphia Eagles	**W** 45–17	5–5	Lincoln Financial Field	Recap
12	November 29	at Indianapolis Colts	**L** 12–25	5–6	Lucas Oil Stadium	Recap
13	December 6	**Atlanta Falcons**	**W** 23–19	6–6	Raymond James Stadium	Recap
14	December 13	**New Orleans Saints**	**L** 17–24	6–7	Raymond James Stadium	Recap
15	December 17	at St. Louis Rams	**L** 23–31	6–8	Edward Jones Dome	Recap
16	December 27	Chicago Bears	**L** 21–26	6–9	Raymond James Stadium	Recap
17	January 3	at **Carolina Panthers**	**L** 10–38	6–10	Bank of America Stadium	Recap

Note: Intra-division opponents are in bold text.

=== Game summaries ===
==== Week 1: vs. Tennessee Titans ====
Week One: Tennessee Titans at Tampa Bay Buccaneers – Game summary

Quarter	1	2	3	4	Total
**Titans**	21	14	7	0	**42**
Buccaneers	0	7	0	7	**14**

at Raymond James Stadium, Tampa, Florida

- Date: September 13
- Game time: 4:25 p.m. EDT
- Game weather: 84 °F (28.9 °C), cloudy
- Game attendance: 63,945
- Referee: John Hussey
- TV announcers (CBS): Andrew Catalon, Steve Beuerlein, Steve Tasker and Chris Fischer
- Recap, Gamebook

Game information

**First quarter**

- TEN 13:10 – Kendall Wright 52 yard pass from Marcus Mariota (Ryan Succop kick) TEN 7–0
- TEN 11:48 – Coty Sensabaugh 26 yard interception return (Ryan Succop kick) TEN 14–0
- TEN 6:49 – Bishop Sankey 12 yard pass from Marcus Mariota (Ryan Succop kick) TEN 21–0

**Second quarter**

- TB 14:54 – Austin Seferian-Jenkins 5 yard pass from Jameis Winston (Kyle Brindza kick) TEN 21–7
- TEN 3:47 – Harry Douglas 4 yard pass from Marcus Mariota (Ryan Succop kick) TEN 28–7
- TEN 0:48 – Delanie Walker 1 yard pass from Marcus Mariota (Ryan Succop kick) TEN 35–7

**Third quarter**

- TEN 8:02 – Bishop Sankey 1 yard run (Ryan Succop kick) TEN 42–7

**Fourth quarter**

- TB 9:18 – Austin Seferian-Jenkins 41 yard pass from Jameis Winston (Kyle Brindza kick) TEN 42–14

**Top passers**

- TEN – Marcus Mariota 13/15, 209 yards, 4 TDs
- TB – Jameis Winston 16/33, 210 yards, 2 TDs, 2 INTs

**Top rushers**

- TEN – Bishop Sankey 12 carries, 74 yards, 1 TD
- TB – Doug Martin 11 carries, 52 yards

**Top receivers**

- TEN – Kendall Wright 4 receptions, 101 yards, 1 TD
- TB – Austin Seferian-Jenkins 5 receptions, 110 yards, 2 TDs

**Top tacklers**

- TEN – Zach Brown 7 tackles
- TB – Chris Conte 5 tackles

Opening day was a matchup between the No. 1 overall and the No. 2 overall selections in the 2015 NFL draft. Jameis Winston started at quarterback for Tampa Bay, and Marcus Mariota started at quarterback for Tennessee. Mariota snagged the headlines for the day, passing for 209 yards and four touchdowns as the Titans routed the Buccaneers 42–14. Winston's Buccaneer debut was mostly forgetful, as his first pass attempt in the NFL was a "pick 6" interception.

==== Week 2: at New Orleans Saints ====
Week Two: Tampa Bay Buccaneers at New Orleans Saints – Game summary

Quarter	1	2	3	4	Total
**Buccaneers**	3	7	13	3	**26**
Saints	0	7	0	12	**19**

at Mercedes-Benz Superdome, New Orleans, Louisiana

- Date: September 20
- Game time: 1:00 p.m. EDT/12:00 p.m. CDT
- Game weather: Played indoors (dome stadium)
- Game attendance: 73,006
- Referee: Carl Cheffers
- TV announcers (Fox): Chris Myers, Ronde Barber and Jennifer Hale
- Preview, Gamebook

Game information

**First quarter**

**Second quarter**

**Third quarter**

**Fourth quarter**

**Top passers**

- TB –
- NO –

**Top rushers**

- TB –
- NO –

**Top receivers**

- TB –
- NO –

**Top tacklers**

- TB –
- NO –

Tampa Bay rebounded after their week 1 loss, and defeated the New Orleans Saints for the first time since October 2011. Jameis Winston threw a touchdown pass and ran for a touchdown, as Tampa Bay jumped out to a 23–7 lead. The Saints rallied, and had two chances for a game-tying touchdown in the final 8 seconds. Drew Brees final throw was knocked down at the endline, and the Buccaneers snapped a 7-game losing streak dating back to the 2014 season.

==== Week 3: at Houston Texans ====
Week Three: Tampa Bay Buccaneers at Houston Texans – Game summary

Quarter	1	2	3	4	Total
Buccaneers	0	9	0	0	**9**
**Texans**	7	0	3	9	**19**

at NRG Stadium, Houston, Texas

- Date: September 27
- Game time: 1:00 p.m. EDT/12:00 p.m. CDT
- Game weather: Played indoors (retractable roof closed)
- Game attendance: 71,718
- Referee: Bill Vinovich
- TV announcers (Fox): Kenny Albert, Daryl Johnston and Holly Sonders
- Recap, Gamebook

Game information

**First quarter**

**Second quarter**

**Third quarter**

**Fourth quarter**

**Top passers**

- TB –
- HOU –

**Top rushers**

- TB –
- HOU –

**Top receivers**

- TB –
- HOU –

**Top tacklers**

- TB –
- HOU –

Buccaneers kicker Kyle Brindza missed three field goals and missed an extra point, as Tampa Bay fell at Houston by the score of 19–9. Jameis Winston threw for 261 yards, one touchdown pass, and one interception in the loss. Brindza did make a 58-yard field goal in the second quarter, which was the second-longest field goal in franchise history. Midway through the third quarter Vincent Jackson appeared to catch a 23-yard touchdown pass from Winston, but it was overturned after review, when it was determined that he did not get both feet down.

==== Week 4: vs. Carolina Panthers ====
Week Four: Carolina Panthers at Tampa Bay Buccaneers – Game summary

Quarter	1	2	3	4	Total
**Panthers**	10	7	14	6	**37**
Buccaneers	3	7	7	6	**23**

at Raymond James Stadium, Tampa, Florida

- Date: October 4
- Game time: 1:00 p.m. EDT
- Game weather: 74 °F (23.3 °C), cloudy
- Game attendance: 57,468
- Referee: Gene Steratore
- TV announcers (Fox): Chris Myers, Ronde Barber and Jennifer Hale
- Recap, Gamebook

Game information

**First quarter**

**Second quarter**

**Third quarter**

**Fourth quarter**

**Top passers**

- CAR –
- TB –

**Top rushers**

- CAR –
- TB –

**Top receivers**

- CAR –
- TB –

**Top tacklers**

- CAR –
- TB –

Cam Newton threw for 124 yards and two touchdown passes, as Carolina beat Tampa Bay by the score of 37–23. Jameis Winston threw for 287 yards and two touchdowns, but threw four interceptions (one returned for a touchdown), and lost a fumbled snap in the defeat. After his struggles the previous week, Buccaneers kicker Kyle Brindza missed two field goals and an extra point, and was cut by the club on Monday morning.

==== Week 5: vs. Jacksonville Jaguars ====
Week Five: Jacksonville Jaguars at Tampa Bay Buccaneers – Game summary

Quarter	1	2	3	4	Total
Jaguars	0	14	10	7	**31**
**Buccaneers**	3	17	11	7	**38**

at Raymond James Stadium, Tampa, Florida

- Date: October 11
- Game time: 1:00 p.m. EDT
- Game weather: 84 °F (28.9 °C), clear
- Game attendance: 58,490
- Referee: Jerome Boger
- TV announcers (CBS): Spero Dedes and Solomon Wilcots
- Recap, Gamebook

Game information

**First quarter**

- TB – Connor Barth 35-yard field goal, Buccaneers 3–0. **Drive: 9 plays, 62 yards, 4:44.**

**Second quarter**

- JAX – Allen Hurns 12-yard pass from Blake Bortles (Jason Myers kick), Jaguars 7–3. **Drive: 10 plays, 78 yards, 5:10.**
- TB – Connor Barth 45-yard field goal, Jaguars 7–6. **Drive: 7 plays, 53 yards, 3:41.**
- TB – Doug Martin 10-yard pass from Jameis Winston (Connor Barth kick), Buccaneers 13–7. **Drive: 3 plays, 17 yards, 1:33.**
- TB – Doug Martin 1-yard run (Connor Barth kick), Buccaneers 20–7. **Drive: 6 plays, 41 yards, 3:26.**
- JAX – Allen Robinson 13-yard pass from Blake Bortles (Jason Myers kick), Buccaneers 20–14. **Drive: 7 plays, 78 yards, 1:50.**

**Third quarter**

- JAX – Jason Myers 31-yard field goal, Buccaneers 20–17. **Drive: 11 plays, 50 yards, 4:57.**
- JAX – T. J. Yeldon 5-yard pass from Blake Bortles (Jason Myers kick), Jaguars 24–20. **Drive: 6 plays, 61 yards, 3:22.**
- TB – Connor Barth 47-yard field goal, Jaguars 24–23. **Drive: 7 plays, 51 yards, 2:28.**
- TB – Jacquies Smith 3-yard fumble return (Jameis Winston to Vincent Jackson pass succeeded), Buccaneers 31–24.

**Fourth quarter**

- TB – Doug Martin 1-yard run (Connor Barth kick), Buccaneers 38–24. **Drive: 8 plays, 40 yards, 5:01.**
- JAX – Allen Robinson 5-yard pass from Blake Bortles (Jason Myers kick), Buccaneers 38–31. **Drive: 7 plays, 86 yards, 1:45.**

**Top passers**

- JAX – Blake Bortles – 23/33, 303 yards, 4 TD, INT
- TB – Jameis Winston – 13/19, 209 yards, TD

**Top rushers**

- JAX – T. J. Yeldon – 11 rushes, 32 yards
- TB – Doug Martin – 24 rushes, 123 yards, 2 TD

**Top receivers**

- JAX – Allen Robinson – 7 receptions, 72 yards, 2 TD
- TB – Doug Martin – 3 receptions, 35 yards, TD

**Top tacklers**

- JAX – Telvin Smith – 13 tackles, 1 assist
- TB – Lavonte David – 8 tackles, 1 assist, 1 sack

Tampa Bay snapped an 11-game home losing streak that dated back to December 2013, defeating Jacksonville by the score of 38–31. Doug Martin rushed for 123 yards, two touchdowns, and had one receiving touchdown. Connor Barth returned to the club as kicker, going 3-for-3 on field goals, and 3-for-3 on extra points.

==== Week 7: at Washington Redskins ====
Week Seven: Tampa Bay Buccaneers at Washington Redskins – Game summary

Quarter	1	2	3	4	Total
Buccaneers	10	14	0	6	**30**
**Redskins**	0	7	14	10	**31**

at FedExField, Landover, Maryland

- Date: October 25
- Game time: 1:00 p.m. EDT
- Game weather: 64 °F (17.8 °C), sunny
- Game attendance: 72,912
- Referee: Jeff Triplette
- TV announcers (Fox): Kenny Albert, Daryl Johnston and Laura Okmin
- Recap, Gamebook

Game information

**First quarter**

**Second quarter**

**Third quarter**

**Fourth quarter**

**Top passers**

- TB –
- WAS –

**Top rushers**

- TB –
- WAS –

**Top receivers**

- TB –
- WAS –

**Top tacklers**

- TB –
- WAS –

==== Week 8: at Atlanta Falcons ====
Week Eight: Tampa Bay Buccaneers at Atlanta Falcons – Game summary

Quarter	1	2	3	4	OT	Total
**Buccaneers**	3	10	7	0	3	**23**
Falcons	3	0	7	10	0	**20**

at Georgia Dome, Atlanta, Georgia

- Date: November 1
- Game time: 1:00 p.m. EST
- Game weather: Played indoors (dome stadium)
- Game attendance: 70,524
- Referee: Ron Torbert
- TV announcers (Fox): Justin Kutcher, Charles Davis and Tony Siragusa
- Recap, Gamebook

Game information

**First quarter**

**Second quarter**

**Third quarter**

**Fourth quarter**

**Top passers**

- TB –
- ATL –

**Top rushers**

- TB –
- ATL –

**Top receivers**

- TB –
- ATL –

**Top tacklers**

- TB –
- ATL –

Atlanta turned the ball over four times, twice inside the red zone. Tampa Bay jumped out to a 17-point lead, with 20 points scored off of turnovers. However, Matt Ryan threw a game-tying touchdown pass to Julio Jones with 17 seconds left in regulation to force overtime. The Buccaneers won the coin toss in overtime, and scored a field goal on their first possession. The Tampa Bay defense held Atlanta to a turnover on downs, securing a 23–20 victory.

==== Week 9: vs. New York Giants ====
Week Nine: New York Giants at Tampa Bay Buccaneers – Game summary

Quarter	1	2	3	4	Total
**Giants**	10	7	3	12	**32**
Buccaneers	6	3	3	6	**18**

at Raymond James Stadium, Tampa, Florida

- Date: November 8
- Game time: 4:05 p.m. EST
- Game weather: 80 °F (26.7 °C), cloudy
- Game attendance: 64,351
- Referee: Clete Blakeman
- TV announcers (Fox): Kenny Albert, Daryl Johnston and Laura Okmin
- Recap, Gamebook

Game information

**First quarter**

**Second quarter**

**Third quarter**

**Fourth quarter**

**Top passers**

- NYG –
- TB –

**Top rushers**

- NYG –
- TB –

**Top receivers**

- NYG –
- TB –

**Top tacklers**

- NYG –
- TB –

Jameis Winston scrambled for a 10-yard touchdown run with 9:25 remaining, but the potential game-tying two point conversion attempt failed. The Giants subsequently kicked two field goals to go back up by 8 points. The Buccaneers attempted a hook and lateral play as time expired, but Trevin Wade of the Giants recovered the loose ball and ran it in for a touchdown the other way.

==== Week 10: vs. Dallas Cowboys ====
Week Ten: Dallas Cowboys at Tampa Bay Buccaneers – Game summary

Quarter	1	2	3	4	Total
Cowboys	3	3	0	0	**6**
**Buccaneers**	0	3	0	7	**10**

at Raymond James Stadium, Tampa, Florida

- Date: November 15
- Game time: 1:00 p.m. EST
- Game weather: 79 °F (26.1 °C), cloudy
- Game attendance: 64,133
- Referee: Bill Vinovich
- TV announcers (Fox): Kevin Burkhardt, John Lynch and Pam Oliver
- Recap, Gamebook

Game information

**First quarter**

- DAL – Dan Bailey 42-yard field goal, 4:00. Cowboys 3–0. **Drive: 12 plays, 28 yards, 6:20.**

**Second quarter**

- TB – Connor Barth 52-yard field goal, 14:56. Tied 3–3. **Drive: 9 plays, 46 yards, 4:04.**
- DAL – Dan Bailey 53-yard field goal, 10:41. Cowboys 6–3. **Drive: 7 plays, 34 yards, 4:17.**

**Third quarter**

- No scoring plays.

**Fourth quarter**

- TB – Jameis Winston 1-yard run (Connor Barth kick), 0:59. Buccaneers 10–6. **Drive: 10 plays, 56 yards, 3:06.**

**Top passers**

- DAL – Matt Cassel – 19/29, 186 yards, INT
- TB – Jameis Winston – 22/39, 264 yards, 2 INT

**Top rushers**

- DAL – Darren McFadden – 17 rushes, 32 yards
- TB – Doug Martin – 18 rushes, 63 yards

**Top receivers**

- DAL – Dez Bryant – 5 receptions, 45 yards
- TB – Mike Evans – 8 receptions, 126 yards

**Top tacklers**

- DAL –
- TB –

Dallas and Tampa Bay were limited to field goals for the first 59 minutes of the game. Trailing 6–3 with just over one minute left, Buccaneers quarterback Jameis Winston scrambled for a 4-yard run to the endzone, but lost the ball as he was up-ended just short of the goal line. Dallas recovered the fumble, but was penalized for defensive holding by Jeff Heath. On the next play, Winston ran a naked bootleg for a 1-yard touchdown and a 10–6 Tampa Bay lead with 59 seconds remaining in regulation. With 28 seconds left, Matt Cassel's pass intended for Dez Bryant was intercepted by Bradley McDougald in the endzone to secure the victory. Bryant lobbied for pass interference due to contact by McDougald, but it was not called. It was Tampa Bay's first victory against Dallas since 2003, and the Cowboys' 7th straight loss (all without Tony Romo).

==== Week 11: at Philadelphia Eagles ====
Week Eleven: Tampa Bay Buccaneers at Philadelphia Eagles – Game summary

Quarter	1	2	3	4	Total
**Buccaneers**	7	21	7	10	**45**
Eagles	7	7	0	3	**17**

at Lincoln Financial Field, Philadelphia, Pennsylvania

- Date: November 22
- Game time: 1:00 p.m. EST
- Game weather: 48 °F (8.9 °C), cloudy
- Game attendance: 69,596
- Referee: Brad Allen
- TV announcers (Fox): Dick Stockton, David Diehl and Kristina Pink
- Recap, Gamebook

Game information

**First quarter**

- PHI – Josh Huff 39-yard pass from Mark Sanchez (Caleb Sturgis kick), 11:44. Eagles 7–0. **Drive: 7 plays, 86 yards, 2:26.**
- TB – Mike Evans 4-yard pass from Jameis Winston (Connor Barth kick), 2:54. Tied 7–7. **Drive: 5 plays, 75 yards, 2:55.**

**Second quarter**

- TB – Vincent Jackson 13-yard pass from Jameis Winston (Connor Barth kick), 15:00. Buccaneers 14–7. **Drive: 5 plays, 59 yards, 2:09.**
- TB – Russell Shepard 4-yard pass from Jameis Winston (Connor Barth kick), 8:10. Buccaneers 21–7. **Drive: 4 plays, 85 yards, 2:03.**
- PHI – Darren Sproles 35-yard pass from Mark Sanchez (Caleb Sturgis kick), 6:12. Buccaneers 21–14. **Drive: 6 plays, 61 yards, 2:02.**
- TB – Charles Sims 14-yard pass from Jameis Winston (Connor Barth kick), 1:11. Buccaneers 28–14. **Drive: 13 plays, 80 yards, 4:59.**

**Third quarter**

- TB – Cameron Brate 8-yard pass from Jameis Winston (Connor Barth kick), 5:16. Buccaneers 35–14. **Drive: 15 plays, 80 yards, 9:47.**

**Fourth quarter**

- TB – Connor Barth 28-yard field goal, 12:05. Buccaneers 38–14. **Drive: 11 plays, 70 yards, 5:11.**
- PHI – Caleb Sturgis 43-yard field goal, 5:14. Buccaneers 38–17. **Drive: 12 plays, 59 yards, 3:57.**
- TB – Lavonte David 20-yard interception return (Connor Barth kick), 4:21. Buccaneers 45–17.

**Top passers**

- TB – Jameis Winston – 19/29, 246 yards, 5 TD
- PHI – Mark Sanchez – 26/41, 261 yards, 2 TD, 3 INT

**Top rushers**

- TB – Doug Martin – 27 rushes, 235 yards
- PHI – DeMarco Murray – 13 rushes, 64 yards

**Top receivers**

- TB – Mike Evans – 4 receptions, 63 yards, TD
- PHI – Brent Celek – 7 receptions, 79 yards

**Top tacklers**

- TB –
- PHI –

Doug Martin rushed for 235 yards, and Jameis Winston threw five touchdown passes (tying an NFL rookie record), as Tampa Bay routed the Eagles by a score of 45–17. The combined 283 rushing yards was a franchise record for the Buccaneers, and the 521 total offensive yards was the second-highest regular season total in team history.

==== Week 12: at Indianapolis Colts ====
Week Twelve: Tampa Bay Buccaneers at Indianapolis Colts – Game summary

Quarter	1	2	3	4	Total
Buccaneers	3	9	0	0	**12**
**Colts**	3	3	13	6	**25**

at Lucas Oil Stadium, Indianapolis, Indiana

- Date: November 29
- Game time: 1:00 p.m. EST
- Game weather: 37 °F (2.8 °C), partly cloudy — retractable roof open
- Game attendance: 65,696
- Referee: Walt Coleman
- TV announcers (Fox): Dick Stockton, Matt Millen and Peter Schrager
- Recap, Gamebook

Game information

**First quarter**

**Second quarter**

**Third quarter**

**Fourth quarter**

**Top passers**

- TB –
- IND –

**Top rushers**

- TB –
- IND –

**Top receivers**

- TB –
- IND –

**Top tacklers**

- TB –
- IND –

==== Week 13: vs. Atlanta Falcons ====
Week Thirteen: Atlanta Falcons at Tampa Bay Buccaneers – Game summary

Quarter	1	2	3	4	Total
Falcons	0	9	3	7	**19**
**Buccaneers**	7	0	9	7	**23**

at Raymond James Stadium, Tampa, Florida

- Date: December 6
- Game time: 1:00 p.m. EST
- Game weather: 79 °F (26.1 °C), cloudy
- Game attendance: 58,221
- Referee: Ed Hochuli
- TV announcers (Fox): Dick Stockton, David Diehl and Kristina Pink
- Recap, Gamebook

Game information

**First quarter**

**Second quarter**

**Third quarter**

**Fourth quarter**

**Top passers**

- ATL –
- TB –

**Top rushers**

- ATL –
- TB –

**Top receivers**

- ATL –
- TB –

**Top tacklers**

- ATL –
- TB –

Tampa Bay swept Atlanta for the first time since 2007. Jameis Winston threw for 227 yards, one touchdown pass, and one rushing touchdown. Winston connected on a 6-yard touchdown pass to Mike Evans with 1:39 remaining for the game-winning score. One play later, Lavonte David sealed the win with an interception of Matt Ryan on the first play of the Falcons' final drive.

==== Week 14: vs. New Orleans Saints ====
Week Fourteen: New Orleans Saints at Tampa Bay Buccaneers – Game summary

Quarter	1	2	3	4	Total
**Saints**	7	10	7	0	**24**
Buccaneers	0	10	0	7	**17**

at Raymond James Stadium, Tampa, Florida

- Date: December 13
- Game time: 1:00 p.m. EST
- Game weather: 81 °F (27.2 °C), cloudy
- Game attendance: 62,138
- Referee: Clete Blakeman
- TV announcers (Fox): Dick Stockton, David Diehl and Kristina Pink
- Recap, Gamebook

Game information

**First quarter**

**Second quarter**

**Third quarter**

**Fourth quarter**

**Top passers**

- NO –
- TB –

**Top rushers**

- NO –
- TB –

**Top receivers**

- NO –
- TB –

**Top tacklers**

- NO –
- TB –

Drew Brees threw for 312 yards and two touchdown passes, as New Orleans defeated Tampa Bay 24–17. The Saints jumped out to a 14–0 lead in the second quarter, and led 17–10 at halftime. Tampa Bay made the score 24–17 after Jameis Winston threw a touchdown pass to Adam Humphries with just under 9 minutes left in regulation. Trailing by 7, the Buccaneers got the ball back with 5:22 to go, but went 3-and-out. The Saints were then able to run out the clock to secure the win.

==== Week 15: at St. Louis Rams ====
Week Fifteen: Tampa Bay Buccaneers at St. Louis Rams – Game summary

Quarter	1	2	3	4	Total
Buccaneers	3	0	3	17	**23**
**Rams**	14	7	7	3	**31**

at Edward Jones Dome, St. Louis, Missouri

- Date: December 17
- Game time: 8:25 p.m. EST/7:25 p.m. CST
- Game weather: Played indoors (dome stadium)
- Game attendance: 51,295
- Referee: Jerome Boger
- TV announcers (NFLN): Ian Eagle, Trent Green and Evan Washburn
- Recap, Gamebook

Game information

**First quarter**

- STL 11:54 – Tavon Austin 17 yard pass from Case Keenum (Greg Zuerlein kick) STL 7–0
- TB 4:52 – Connor Barth 53 yard field goal STL 7–3
- STL 3:15 – Kenny Britt 60 yard pass from Case Keenum (Greg Zeurlein kick) STL 14–3

**Second quarter**

- STL 2:09 – Todd Gurley 3 yard run (Greg Zeurlein kick) STL 21–3

**Third quarter**

- TB 9:16 – Connor Barth 32 yard field goal STL 21–6
- STL 5:35 – Tavon Austin 21 yard run (Greg Zeurlein kick) STL 28–6

**Fourth quarter**

- TB 13:05 – Luke Stocker 3 yard pass from Jameis Winston (Connor Barth kick) STL 28–13
- STL 10:39 – Greg Zeurlein 19 yard field goal STL 31–13
- TB 7:31 – Connor Barth 24 yard field goal STL 31–16
- TB 1:34 – Austin Seferian-Jenkins 9 yard pass from Jameis Winston (Connor Barth kick) STL 31–23

**Top passers**

- TB – Jameis Winston 29/50, 363 yards, 2 TDs, 1 INT
- STL – Case Keenum 14/17, 234 yards, 2 TDs

**Top rushers**

- TB – Doug Martin 18 carries, 91 yards
- STL – Todd Gurley 21 carries, 48 yards, 1 TD

**Top receivers**

- TB – Mike Evans 9 receptions, 157 yards
- STL – Kenny Britt 2 receptions, 71 yards, 1 TD

**Top tacklers**

- TB – William Gholston 11 tackles, 1 tackle for loss
- STL – Trumaine Johnson 9 tackles, 1 INT

Case Keenum threw for 234 yards and two touchdowns for the St. Louis Rams on Thursday Night Football. The Rams jumped out to a 28–6 lead after three quarters. Jameis Winston rallied the Buccaneers with a career-high 363 yards passing, and threw two touchdown passes to trim the deficit to 31–23 with 1:34 left in regulation. An onside kick attempt failed, and the Rams ran out the clock to secure the victory. This would become the final home game for the Rams in St. Louis, as the team relocated back to Los Angeles for the 2016 season.

==== Week 16: vs. Chicago Bears ====
Week Sixteen: Chicago Bears at Tampa Bay Buccaneers – Game summary

Quarter	1	2	3	4	Total
**Bears**	0	13	0	13	**26**
Buccaneers	7	0	7	7	**21**

at Raymond James Stadium, Tampa, Florida

- Date: December 27
- Game time: 1:00 p.m. EST
- Game weather: 83 °F (28.3 °C), cloudy
- Game attendance: 63,734
- Referee: Pete Morelli
- TV announcers (Fox): Sam Rosen, Matt Millen and Peter Schrager
- Recap, Gamebook

Game information

**First quarter**

- TB 6:27 – Doug Martin 4 yard run (Connor Barth kick) TB 7–0

**Second quarter**

- CHI 11:35 – Ka'Deem Carey 1 yard run (Robbie Gould kick) Tied 7–7
- CHI 3:00 – Robbie Gould 26 yard field goal CHI 10–7
- CHI 0:08 – Robbie Gould 27 yard field goal CHI 13–7

**Third quarter**

- TB 11:24 – Charles Sims 50 yard pass from Jameis Winston (Connor Barth kick) TB 14–13

**Fourth quarter**

- CHI 14:55 – Ka'Deem Carey 1 yard pass from Jay Cutler (Robbie Gould kick) CHI 20–14
- CHI 9:04 – Robbie Gould 50 yard field goal CHI 23–14
- CHI 1:07 – Robbie Gould 39 yard field goal CHI 26–14
- TB 0:01 – Austin Seferian-Jenkins 43 yard pass from Jameis Winston CHI 26–21

**Top passers**

- CHI – Jay Cutler 20/27, 156 yards, TD
- TB – Jameis Winston 15/29, 295 yards, 2 TDs, INT

**Top rushers**

- CHI – Jeremy Langford 19 rushes, 83 yards
- TB – Doug Martin 17 rushes, 49 yards, TD

**Top receivers**

- CHI – Zach Miller 7 receptions, 69 yards
- TB – Charles Sims 3 receptions, 72 yards, TD

**Top tacklers**

- CHI – Christian Jones – 6 tackles
- TB – Bradley McDougald – 12 tackles

==== Week 17: at Carolina Panthers ====
Week Seventeen: Tampa Bay Buccaneers at Carolina Panthers – Game summary

Quarter	1	2	3	4	Total
Buccaneers	3	0	7	0	**10**
**Panthers**	0	24	7	7	**38**

at Bank of America Stadium, Charlotte, North Carolina

- Date: January 3, 2016
- Game time: 4:25 p.m. EST
- Game weather: 54 °F (12.2 °C), partly cloudy
- Game attendance: 74,169
- Referee: Jerome Boger
- TV announcers (Fox): Dick Stockton, David Diehl and Kristina Pink
- Recap, Gamebook

Game information

**First quarter**

**Second quarter**

**Third quarter**

**Fourth quarter**

**Top passers**

- TB –
- CAR –

**Top rushers**

- TB –
- CAR –

**Top receivers**

- TB –
- CAR –

**Top tacklers**

- TB –
- CAR –

After an incomplete pass by Jameis Winston, Mike Evans exchanged heated words with the officials resulting in Evans receiving two unsportsmanlike conduct fouls and an ejection from the game.

== Standings ==
=== Division ===
NFC South
	W	L	T	PCT	DIV	CONF	PF	PA	STK
^{(1)} Carolina Panthers	15	1	0	.938	5–1	11–1	500	308	W1
Atlanta Falcons	8	8	0	.500	1–5	5–7	339	345	L1
New Orleans Saints	7	9	0	.438	3–3	5–7	408	476	W2
Tampa Bay Buccaneers	6	10	0	.375	3–3	5–7	342	417	L4

=== Conference ===
NFC
#	Team	Division	W	L	T	PCT	DIV	CONF	SOS	SOV	STK
Division Leaders
1	Carolina Panthers	South	15	1	0	.938	5–1	11–1	.441	.438	W1
2	Arizona Cardinals	West	13	3	0	.813	4–2	10–2	.477	.457	L1
3	Minnesota Vikings	North	11	5	0	.688	5–1	8–4	.504	.449	W3
4	Washington Redskins	East	9	7	0	.563	4–2	8–4	.465	.403	W4
Wild Cards
5 (Note: Green Bay finished ahead of Seattle based on head-to-head victory.)	Green Bay Packers	North	10	6	0	.625	3–3	7–5	.531	.450	L2
6	Seattle Seahawks	West	10	6	0	.625	3–3	7–5	.520	.431	W1
Did not qualify for the postseason
7	Atlanta Falcons	South	8	8	0	.500	1–5	5–7	.480	.453	L1
8 (Note: St. Louis and Detroit finished ahead of Philadelphia and New Orleans based on conference record. St. Louis finished ahead of Detroit based on head-to-head victory. Detroit finished ahead of Philadelphia and New Orleans based on head-to-head sweep, while Philadelphia finished ahead of New Orleans based on head-to-head victory.)	St. Louis Rams	West	7	9	0	.438	4–2	6–6	.527	.482	L1
9	Detroit Lions	North	7	9	0	.438	3–3	6–6	.535	.429	W3
10	Philadelphia Eagles	East	7	9	0	.438	3–3	4–8	.508	.473	W1
11	New Orleans Saints	South	7	9	0	.438	3–3	5–7	.504	.402	W2
12 (Note: The New York Giants and Chicago each finished ahead of Tampa Bay based on head-to-head victory, while the Giants finished ahead of Chicago based on conference record.)	New York Giants	East	6	10	0	.375	2–4	4–8	.500	.396	L3
13	Chicago Bears	North	6	10	0	.375	1–5	3–9	.547	.469	L1
14	Tampa Bay Buccaneers	South	6	10	0	.375	3–3	5–7	.484	.406	L4
15	San Francisco 49ers	West	5	11	0	.313	1–5	4–8	.539	.463	W1
16	Dallas Cowboys	East	4	12	0	.250	3–3	3–9	.531	.438	L4
Tiebreakers (Note: When breaking ties for three or more teams under the NFL's rules, they are first broken within divisions, then comparing only the highest-ranked remaining team from each division.)

== Awards ==
- Week 2: Pepsi Next Rookie of the Week — Jameis Winston
- Week 3: Pepsi Next Rookie of the Week — Kwon Alexander
- Week 5: FedEx Ground Player of the Week — Doug Martin
- Week 5: Special Teams Player of the Week — Bobby Rainey
- Week 5: Pepsi Next Rookie of the Week — Jameis Winston
- Week 11: Defensive Player of the Week — Lavonte David
- Week 11: FedEx Air Player of the Week — Jameis Winston
- Week 11: Pepsi Next Rookie of the Week — Jameis Winston
- Week 11: FedEx Ground Player of the Week — Doug Martin
- November: Offensive Rookie of the Month — Jameis Winston
- Week 13: Castrol Edge Clutch Performer of the Week — Jameis Winston
