= 2013 Tampa Bay Buccaneers season =

38th season in franchise history; last with Malcom Glazer as owner

- Owner: Malcolm Glazer
- General manager: Mark Dominik
- Head coach: Greg Schiano
- Home stadium: Raymond James Stadium

Results
- Record: 4–12
- Division place: 4th NFC South
- Playoffs: Did not qualify
- Pro Bowlers: DT Gerald McCoy; CB Darrelle Revis

Uniform
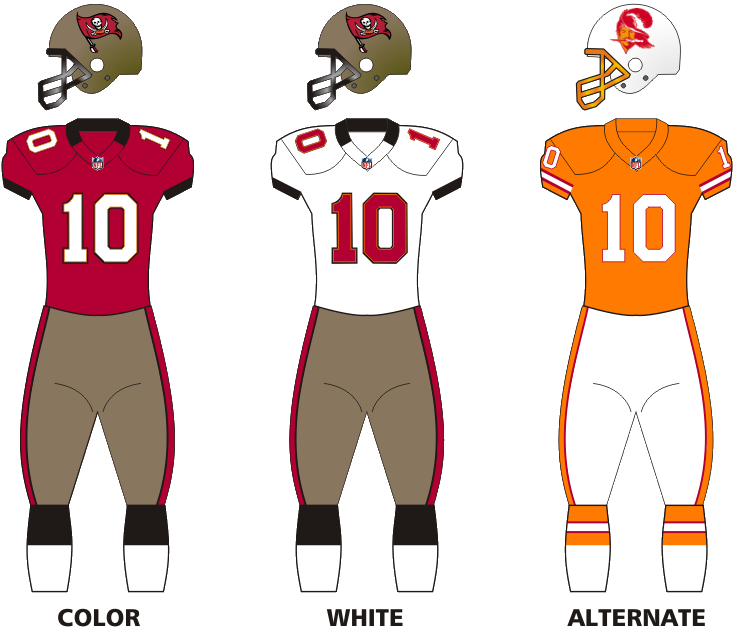

The 2013 season was the Tampa Bay Buccaneers' 38th in the National Football League (NFL), and second and final under head coach Greg Schiano. It also marked the 19th and final season under the ownership of Malcolm Glazer, who died on May 28, 2014. The Buccaneers finished with a record of 4–12 and failed to improve their 7–9 record from last season, and were eliminated from postseason contention in Week 13. For the first time since 1996, longtime cornerback Ronde Barber was not on the roster, as he retired in May 2013.

Despite having a +10 turnover margin (tied for 3rd best in the NFL), and franchise rookie quarterback records from third round draft pick Mike Glennon, the overall offensive production ranked near the bottom of the league in most categories. The team ranked 32nd (last) in total yards, 32nd (last) in passing yards, 30th in total points scored. The team also had the third-most penalties in the league (121 for 1,136 yards), and ranked 31st in third down conversions. Running back Doug Martin went on injured reserve halfway through the season with a shoulder injury. His replacement, Bobby Rainey had a solid performance, scoring his first career touchdown, and setting a franchise record for longest touchdown run (80 yards). On the defensive side, the offseason news was highlighted by the free agent acquisition of Darrelle Revis, and Lavonte David's stellar numbers.

== Season ==
The team got off to a dismal start, which created considerable tension inside and outside the locker room, as well as among fans. The fan support of head coach Greg Schiano began to decay, as illustrated by a local radio station erecting a billboard carrying the message "Fire Schiano." The trouble started on opening day, as Tampa Bay had a last-second loss to the Jets, owing primarily to a personal foul late hit penalty, which advanced the Jets into field goal range, and an improbable comeback victory. Late-game losses to New Orleans, Arizona, and Seattle brought the Buccaneers to an 0–8 start. The Buccaneers won four of their next five games, but were ultimately eliminated from playoff contention by December, and they dropped the last three games.

One day after the conclusion of the regular season, head coach Greg Schiano and general manager Mark Dominik were fired.

For the first time since 2009, all eight regular season home games were announced as a "sellout," and no regular season games were blacked out locally. Due to the new concussion rule, the Bucs did not wear their "creamsicle" throwback uniforms at all during this season.

Darrelle Revis was named the Sporting News Comeback Player of the Year.

=== Josh Freeman benching ===
The season started out on a rocky note, as reports of a rift between head coach Greg Schiano and starting quarterback Josh Freeman were coming from the locker room. Freeman was entering the final season of his contract, and trade rumors were already being tossed around by media and fans. An allegation surfaced that Schiano rigged the voting for team captains, which prevented Freeman from being selected by his teammates. The next day, Freeman missed the annual team photo session, an absence he blamed on "oversleeping." After starting the season 0–3, Freeman was quickly criticized for his poor offensive output, throwing a league-worst 45.3% completion percentage, two interceptions, and only two touchdown passes. It was also leaked that Freeman was a stage one participant in the NFL drug program, a situation related to his treatment of ADHD. On week four, Freeman was benched in favor of rookie Mike Glennon, and on October 3, 2013, Freeman was released from the team as he granted.

=== MRSA outbreak ===
During training camp, an outbreak of MRSA was reported in the Tampa Bay locker room. Carl Nicks and Lawrence Tynes contracted the infection over the summer. Nicks missed several games, while Tynes was placed on the non-football injured reserve list. After a third player, Johnthan Banks, was diagnosed in early October, the week 6 games against the Eagles was in jeopardy of postponement, due to concerns over transmission. However, it was held as scheduled after medical specialists and NFLPA representatives inspected the facility.

== 2013 draft class ==
2013 Tampa Bay Buccaneers draft
Round	Selection	Player	Position	College
2	43	Johnthan Banks	Cornerback	Mississippi State
3	73	Mike Glennon	Quarterback	North Carolina State
4	100	Akeem Spence	Defensive tackle	Illinois
4	126	William Gholston	Defensive end	Michigan State
5	147	Steven Means	Defensive end	Buffalo
6	189	Mike James	Running back	Miami (FL)

=== Trades ===
- The Buccaneers acquired an additional 2013 seventh-round pick (226th overall) that sent defensive tackle Brian Price to the Chicago Bears on July 26, 2012.
- The Buccaneers later traded that same additional 2013 seventh-round pick (226th overall) that was acquired by the Bears, along with cornerback Aqib Talib, to the New England Patriots in exchange for a 2013 fourth-round pick (126th overall) on November 1, 2012.
- Tampa Bay traded Arrelious Benn and a seventh-round pick to Philadelphia in exchange for the Eagles' 2013 sixth-round pick (196th overall) and a conditional draft pick in 2014.
- Tampa Bay traded their first-round pick (13th overall) and a conditional fourth-round pick in 2014, to the Jets in exchange for Darrelle Revis.
- Tampa Bay traded their fourth-round selection (112th overall) and their sixth-round selection (181st overall) to Oakland in exchange for the Raiders' fourth-round selection (100th overall) in order to draft Akeem Spence on the third day of the 2013 NFL draft.
- Tampa Bay traded LeGarrette Blount to New England for Jeff Demps and a seventh-round selection (229th overall).
- Tampa Bay traded their sixth-round selection (196th overall) and their seven-round selection (229th overall) to Minnesota for a sixth-round selection (189th overall) in order to draft Mike James on the third day of the 2013 NFL Draft.
- Tampa Bay traded their 2014 sixth-round selection to Chicago for Gabe Carimi.

== Staff ==
2013 Tampa Bay Buccaneers staff
Front office: Owner/president – Malcolm Glazer; Co-chairman – Bryan Glazer; Co-chairman – Edward Glazer; Co-chairman – Joel Glazer; General manager – Mark Dominik; Director of player personnel – Dennis Hickey; Director of college scouting – Eric Stokes; coordinator of pro scouting – Shelton Quarles; coordinator of football administration – Mike Greenberg; Special assistant to the head coach – Butch Davis; Head coaches: Head coach – Greg Schiano; Offensive coaches: Offensive coordinator – Mike Sullivan; Senior offensive assistant – Jimmy Raye; Quarterbacks – John McNulty; Running backs – Earnest Byner; Wide receivers – John Garrett; Tight ends – Brian Angelichio; Offensive line – Bob Bostad; Assistant offensive line – Steve Loney; Offensive assistant – Ben McDaniels	Defensive coaches: Defensive coordinator – Bill Sheridan; Assistant defensive coordinator – Bob Fraser; Defensive line – Randy Melvin; Defensive front seven – Bryan Cox; Linebackers – Robb Smith; Defensive backs – Tony Oden; Assistant defensive backs – Jeff Hafley; Defensive assistant – Tem Lukabu; Quality control to the head coach – Dan Shamash; Special teams coaches: Special teams coordinator – Dave Wannstedt; Assistant special teams – Phil Galiano; Strength and conditioning: Head strength and conditioning – Jay Butler; Assistant strength and conditioning – Joe Vaughn; Assistant strength and conditioning – Bob Gilmartin

== Final roster ==
2013 Tampa Bay Buccaneers roster
Quarterbacks (QB): 8 Mike Glennon; 6 Dan Orlovsky; Running backs (RB): 44 Michael Hill; 46 Spencer Larsen FB; 30 Brian Leonard; 41 Erik Lorig FB; 45 Lonnie Pryor FB; 43 Bobby Rainey; Wide receivers (WR): 18 Skye Dawson; 83 Vincent Jackson; 80 Chris Owusu; 17 Eric Page; 11 Tiquan Underwood; Tight ends (TE): 86 Kyle Adams; 81 Tim Wright	Offensive linemen (OL): 72 Gabe Carimi G/T; 69 Demar Dotson T; 75 Davin Joseph G; 62 Ted Larsen C; 79 Jamon Meredith G; 77 Carl Nicks G; 66 Patrick Omameh G; 70 Donald Penn T; 76 Jeremy Zuttah C; Defensive linemen (DL): 94 Adrian Clayborn DE; 92 William Gholston DE; 95 Gary Gibson DT; 90 Derek Landri DT; 65 Matthew Masifilo DT; 93 Gerald McCoy DT; 96 Steven Means DE; 60 Scott Solomon DE; 97 Akeem Spence DT	Linebackers (LB): 54 Lavonte David OLB; 59 Mason Foster MLB; 58 Ka'Lial Glaud OLB; 57 Adam Hayward MLB; 51 Danny Lansanah OLB; 50 Daniel Te'o-Nesheim OLB; 56 Dekoda Watson OLB; Defensive backs (DB): 27 Johnthan Banks CB; 23 Mark Barron SS; 33 Deveron Carr CB; 38 Dashon Goldson FS; 36 Danny Gorrer CB; 29 Leonard Johnson CB; 35 Kelcie McCray SS; 49 Bradley McDougald FS; 24 Darrelle Revis CB; 37 Keith Tandy SS; Special teams (ST): 48 Andrew Economos LS; 9 Michael Koenen P; 4 Rian Lindell K	Practice squad: 39 Marc Anthony CB; 67 Emmett Cleary T; 73 Jace Daniels T; 74 Everett Dawkins DT; 31 Bobby Felder CB; 68 Jason Foster G; 7 Jordan Rodgers QB; 85 Tommy Streeter WR; Reserve: 21 Michael Adams CB (IR); 10 Connor Barth K (NF-Inj.); -- Marvin Booker DE (IR); 91 Da'Quan Bowers DE (IR); 82 Nate Byham TE (IR); 52 Jonathan Casillas OLB (IR); 84 Tom Crabtree TE (IR); 51 Jacob Cutrera OLB (IR); 32 Jeff Demps RB (IR); 26 Anthony Gaitor CB (IR); 25 Mike James RB (IR); 22 Doug Martin RB (IR); 28 Rashaan Melvin CB (IR); 89 Russell Shepard WR (IR); 34 Michael Smith RB (IR); 88 Luke Stocker TE (IR); 1 Lawrence Tynes K (NF-Inj.); 19 Mike Williams WR (IR); Rookies in italics 53 active, 18 reserve, 8 practice squad

== Preseason ==
Week	Date	Opponent	Result	Record	Venue	Recap
1	August 8	Baltimore Ravens	L 16–44	0–1	Raymond James Stadium	Recap
2	August 16	at New England Patriots	L 21–25	0–2	Gillette Stadium	Recap
3	August 24	at Miami Dolphins	W 17–16	1–2	Sun Life Stadium	Recap
4	August 29	Washington Redskins	L 12–30	1–3	Raymond James Stadium	Recap

== Regular season ==
=== Schedule ===
Week	Date	Opponent	Result	Record	Venue	Recap
1	September 8	at New York Jets	L 17–18	0–1	MetLife Stadium	Recap
2	September 15	New Orleans Saints	L 14–16	0–2	Raymond James Stadium	Recap
3	September 22	at New England Patriots	L 3–23	0–3	Gillette Stadium	Recap
4	September 29	Arizona Cardinals	L 10–13	0–4	Raymond James Stadium	Recap
5	Bye					
6	October 13	Philadelphia Eagles	L 20–31	0–5	Raymond James Stadium	Recap
7	October 20	at Atlanta Falcons	L 23–31	0–6	Georgia Dome	Recap
8	October 24	Carolina Panthers	L 13–31	0–7	Raymond James Stadium	Recap
9	November 3	at Seattle Seahawks	L 24–27 (OT)	0–8	CenturyLink Field	Recap
10	November 11	Miami Dolphins	W 22–19	1–8	Raymond James Stadium	Recap
11	November 17	Atlanta Falcons	W 41–28	2–8	Raymond James Stadium	Recap
12	November 24	at Detroit Lions	W 24–21	3–8	Ford Field	Recap
13	December 1	at Carolina Panthers	L 6–27	3–9	Bank of America Stadium	Recap
14	December 8	Buffalo Bills	W 27–6	4–9	Raymond James Stadium	Recap
15	December 15	San Francisco 49ers	L 14–33	4–10	Raymond James Stadium	Recap
16	December 22	at St. Louis Rams	L 13–23	4–11	Edward Jones Dome	Recap
17	December 29	at New Orleans Saints	L 17–42	4–12	Mercedes-Benz Superdome	Recap

=== Game summaries ===
==== Week 1: at New York Jets ====
Week One: Tampa Bay Buccaneers at New York Jets – Game summary

Quarter	1	2	3	4	Total
Buccaneers	7	7	0	3	17
Jets	2	10	0	6	18

at MetLife Stadium, East Rutherford, New Jersey

- Date: September 8
- Game time: 1:00 p.m. EDT
- Game weather: Sunny, 82 °F (28 °C)
- Game attendance: 76,957
- Referee: Ed Hochuli
- TV announcers (Fox): Kevin Burkhardt, John Lynch and Erin Andrews
- Recap, Game book

Game information

First quarter

- NYJ – Josh Freeman fumble out of bounds in end zone for a safety, 8:35. Jets 2–0.
- TB - Mike Williams 17-yard pass from Josh Freeman (Rian Lindell kick), 1:07. Buccaneers 7–2. Drive: 5 plays, 44 yards, 2:39.

Second quarter

- NYJ – Nick Folk 43-yard field goal, 11:01. Buccaneers 7–5. Drive: 13 plays, 55 yards, 5:06.
- TB – Doug Martin 5-yard run (Rian Lindell kick), 6:46. Buccaneers 14–5. Drive: 1 play, 5 yards, 0:05.
- NYJ – Kellen Winslow 7-yard pass from Geno Smith (Nick Folk kick), 0:34. Buccaneers 14–12. Drive: 6 plays, 31 yards, 1:59.

Third quarter

- No scoring plays.

Fourth quarter

- NYJ – Nick Folk 30-yard field goal, 5:05. Jets 15–14. Drive: 14 plays, 65 yards, 6:20.
- TB – Rian Lindell 37-yard field goal, 0:34. Buccaneers 17–15. Drive: 9 plays, 61 yards, 1:40.
- NYJ – Nick Folk 48-yard field goal, 0:02. Jets 18–17. Drive: 5 plays, 50 yards, 0:32.

Top passers

- TB – Josh Freeman – 15/31, 210 yards, TD, INT
- NYJ – Geno Smith – 24/38, 256 yards, TD, INT

Top rushers

- TB – Doug Martin – 24 rushes, 65 yards, TD
- NYJ – Geno Smith – 6 rushes, 47 yards

Top receivers

- TB – Vincent Jackson – 7 receptions, 154 yards
- NYJ – Kellen Winslow – 7 receptions, 79 yards, TD

Tampa Bay took the lead 17–15 with a Rian Lindell field goal with 34 seconds remaining. However, on the ensuing Jets drive, Jets rookie quarterback Geno Smith scrambled for a 10-yard run to the right sideline. A personal foul penalty was called on Lavonte David of the Buccaneers for a late hit out-of-bounds, which advanced the Jets to the Buccaneers 30-yard line. With 2 seconds left in regulation, Nick Folk kicked a 48-yard field goal, and the Jets won the game 18–17.

==== Week 2: vs. New Orleans Saints ====
Week Two: New Orleans Saints at Tampa Bay Buccaneers – Game summary

Quarter	1	2	3	4	Total
Saints	10	0	3	3	16
Buccaneers	7	0	0	7	14

at Raymond James Stadium, Tampa, Florida

- Date: September 15
- Game time: 4:05 p.m. EDT
- Game weather: Cloudy, 93 °F (34 °C)
- Game attendance: 60,870
- Referee: Bill Leavy
- TV announcers (Fox): Kevin Burkhardt, John Lynch and Erin Andrews
- Recap, Game book

Game information

First quarter

- NO – Garrett Hartley 44-yard field goal, 10:30. Saints 3–0. Drive: 11 plays, 54 yards, 4:30.
- TB – Kevin Ogletree 5-yard pass from Josh Freeman (Rian Lindell kick), 5:15. Buccaneers 7–3. Drive: 7 plays, 35 yards, 2:48.
- NO – Jimmy Graham 56-yard pass from Drew Brees (Garrett Hartley kick), 2:36. Saints 10–7. Drive: 6 plays, 80 yards, 2:39.

Second quarter

- No scoring plays.

Third quarter

- NO – Garrett Hartley 41-yard field goal, 8:04. Saints 13–7. Drive: 8 plays, 17 yards, 3:45.

Fourth quarter

- TB – Mason Foster 85-yard interception return (Rian Lindell kick), 12:40. Buccaneers 14–13.
- NO – Garrett Hartley 27-yard field goal, 0:00. Saints 16–14. Drive: 5 plays, 54 yards, 1:06.

Top passers

- NO – Drew Brees – 26/46, 322 yards, TD, 2 INT
- TB – Josh Freeman – 9/22, 125 yards, TD, INT

Top rushers

- NO – Pierre Thomas – 5 rushes, 29 yards
- TB – Doug Martin – 29 rushes, 144 yards

Top receivers

- NO – Jimmy Graham – 10 receptions, 179 yards, TD
- TB – Vincent Jackson – 5 receptions, 77 yards

Tampa Bay took the lead 14–13 after an 85-yard interception return by Mason Foster with just under 13 minutes remaining. In the closing minutes the Buccaneers drove to the New Orleans 29 yard line, and attempted a field goal with 1:10 left. The kick missed, and the Saints took over with just over one minute left. Drew Brees drove the Saints to the Tampa Bay 9 yard line in three plays, and Garrett Hartley kicked the game-winning field goal as time expired.

==== Week 3: at New England Patriots ====
Week Three: Tampa Bay Buccaneers at New England Patriots – Game summary

Quarter	1	2	3	4	Total
Buccaneers	3	0	0	0	3
Patriots	0	17	3	3	23

at Gillette Stadium, Foxborough, Massachusetts

- Date: September 22
- Game time: 1:00 p.m. EDT
- Game weather: Sunny, 65 °F (18 °C)
- Game attendance: 68,756
- Referee: Jeff Triplette
- TV announcers (Fox): Kevin Burkhardt, John Lynch and Erin Andrews
- Recap, Game book

Game information

First quarter

- TB – Rian Lindell 30-yard field goal, 1:47. Buccaneers 3–0. Drive: 13 plays, 76 yards, 6:01.

Second quarter

- NE – Kenbrell Thompkins 16-yard pass from Tom Brady (Stephen Gostkowski kick), 7:31. Patriots 7–3. Drive: 11 plays, 66 yards, 5:13.
- NE – Kenbrell Thompkins 5-yard pass from Tom Brady (Stephen Gostkowski kick), 0:47. Patriots 14–3. Drive: 10 plays, 62 yards, 3:33.
- NE – Stephen Gostkowski 53-yard field goal, 0:00. Patriots 17–3. Drive: 3 plays, 8 yards, 0:11.

Third quarter

- NE – Stephen Gostkowski 46-yard field goal, 3:38. Patriots 20–3. Drive: 8 plays, 36 yards, 4:15.

Fourth quarter

- NE – Stephen Gostkowski 33-yard field goal, 8:19. Patriots 23–3. Drive: 10 plays, 51 yards, 4:44.

Top passers

- TB – Josh Freeman – 19/41, 236 yards, INT
- NE – Tom Brady – 25/36, 225 yards, 2 TD, INT

Top rushers

- TB – Doug Martin – 20 rushes, 88 yards
- NE – LeGarrette Blount – 14 rushes, 65 yards

Top receivers

- TB – Mike Williams – 5 receptions, 65 yards
- NE – Aaron Dobson – 7 receptions, 52 yards

Tom Brady threw for 225 yards and two touchdown passes, as New England soundly defeated Tampa Bay 23–3. Josh Freeman was sacked three times, and threw one interception, while Doug Martin was held to only 88 yards rushing.

==== Week 4: vs. Arizona Cardinals ====
Week Four: Arizona Cardinals at Tampa Bay Buccaneers – Game summary

Quarter	1	2	3	4	Total
Cardinals	0	0	0	13	13
Buccaneers	7	3	0	0	10

at Raymond James Stadium, Tampa, Florida

- Date: September 29
- Game time: 1:00 p.m. EDT
- Game weather: Sunny, 84 °F (29 °C)
- Game attendance: 44,956
- Referee: Gene Steratore
- TV announcers (Fox): Sam Rosen, Heath Evans and Molly McGrath
- Recap, Game book

Game information

First quarter

- TB – Mike Williams 8-yard pass from Mike Glennon (Rian Lindell kick), 6:17. Buccaneers 7–0. Drive: 6 plays, 41 yards, 2:26.

Second quarter

- TB – Rian Lindell 50-yard field goal, 0:27. Buccaneers 10–0. Drive: 13 plays, 61 yards, 4:23.

Third quarter

- No scoring plays.

Fourth quarter

- ARI – Jay Feely 42-yard field goal, 11:16. Buccaneers 10–3. Drive: 6 plays, 26 yards, 2:14.
- ARI – Larry Fitzgerald 13-yard pass from Carson Palmer (Jay Feely kick), 3:06. Tied 10–10. Drive: 1 play, 13 yards, 0:06.
- ARI – Jay Feely 27-yard field goal, 1:29. Cardinals 13–10. Drive: 5 plays, 29 yards, 0:27.

Top passers

- ARI – Carson Palmer – 21/38, 248 yards, TD, 2 INT
- TB – Mike Glennon – 24/43, 193 yards, TD, 2 INT

Top rushers

- ARI – Andre Ellington – 4 rushes, 29 yards
- TB – Doug Martin – 27 rushes, 45 yards

Top receivers

- ARI – Michael Floyd – 5 receptions, 87 yards
- TB – Tim Wright – 5 receptions, 41 yards

Quarterback Josh Freeman was benched during the week, and rookie Mike Glennon was elevated to the starting role. Glennon led the team to a 10–0 lead after three quarters, but miscues saw Tampa Bay fall late. Early in the 4th quarter, Glennon fumbling a hand-off to Doug Martin set up an Arizona field goal. With 3:23 left in the game, Glennon, deep in his own territory, threw a costly interception, which set up an Arizona touchdown, and a brief 10–10 tie. With 1:33 left in regulation, Arizona kicked the game-winning field goal to win 13–10.

==== Week 6: vs. Philadelphia Eagles ====
Week Six: Philadelphia Eagles at Tampa Bay Buccaneers – Game summary

Quarter	1	2	3	4	Total
Eagles	7	7	7	10	31
Buccaneers	3	14	0	3	20

at Raymond James Stadium, Tampa, Florida

- Date: October 13
- Game time: 1:00 p.m. EDT
- Game weather: Cloudy, 82 °F (28 °C)
- Game attendance: 62,505
- Referee: Clete Blakeman
- TV announcers (Fox): Dick Stockton, Ronde Barber and Kris Budden
- Recap, Game book

Game information

First quarter

- PHI – Nick Foles 4-yard run (Alex Henery kick), 11:46. Eagles 7–0. Drive: 8 plays, 85 yards, 3:14.
- TB – Rian Lindell 38-yard field goal, 6:30. Eagles 7–3. Drive: 7 plays, 20 yards, 4:06.

Second quarter

- TB – Vincent Jackson 24-yard pass from Mike Glennon (Rian Lindell kick), 14:46. Buccaneers 10–7. Drive: 4 plays, 39 yards, 0:55.
- PHI – DeSean Jackson 12-yard pass from Nick Foles (Alex Henery kick), 7:05. Eagles 14–10. Drive: 8 plays, 54 yards, 3:20.
- TB – Vincent Jackson 1-yard pass from Mike Glennon (Rian Lindell kick), 1:02. Buccaneers 17–14. Drive: 10 plays, 79 yards, 6:03.

Third quarter

- PHI – Riley Cooper 47-yard pass from Nick Foles (Alex Henery kick), 11:41. Eagles 21–17. Drive: 5 plays, 66 yards, 1:58.

Fourth quarter

- TB – Rian Lindell 27-yard field goal, 10:48. Eagles 21–20. Drive: 16 plays, 90 yards, 7:57.
- PHI – DeSean Jackson 36-yard pass from Nick Foles (Alex Henery kick), 9:32. Eagles 28–20. Drive: 3 plays, 80 yards, 1:16.
- PHI – Alex Henery 24-yard field goal, 2:34. Eagles 31–20. Drive: 12 plays, 49 yards, 5:29.

Top passers

- PHI – Nick Foles – 22/31, 296 yards, 3 TD
- TB – Mike Glennon – 26/43, 273 yards, 2 TD, INT

Top rushers

- PHI – LeSean McCoy – 25 rushes, 116 yards
- TB – Doug Martin – 16 rushes, 67 yards

Top receivers

- PHI – Riley Cooper – 4 receptions, 120 yards, TD
- TB – Vincent Jackson – 9 receptions, 114 yards, 2 TD

Eagles quarterback Nick Foles threw three touchdown passes and ran for another, as Philadelphia defeated Tampa Bay 31–20. The Buccaneers fell to 0–5.

==== Week 7: at Atlanta Falcons ====
Week Seven: Tampa Bay Buccaneers at Atlanta Falcons – Game summary

Quarter	1	2	3	4	Total
Buccaneers	0	10	7	6	23
Falcons	7	17	0	7	31

at Georgia Dome, Atlanta, Georgia

- Date: October 20
- Game time: 1:00 p.m. EDT
- Game weather: None (indoor stadium)
- Game attendance: 69,522
- Referee: Walt Anderson
- TV announcers (Fox): Kevin Burkhardt, John Lynch and Molly McGrath
- Recap, Game book

Game information

First quarter

- ATL – Thomas DeCoud 30-yard fumble return (Matt Bryant kick), 11:54. Falcons 7–0.

Second quarter

- ATL – Jacquizz Rodgers 19-yard pass from Matt Ryan (Matt Bryant kick), 13:23. Falcons 14–0. Drive: 8 plays, 83 yards, 4:23.
- TB – Vincent Jackson 59-yard pass from Mike Glennon (Rian Lindell kick), 11:54. Falcons 14–7. Drive: 3 plays, 80 yards, 1:29.
- ATL – Matt Bryant 23-yard field goal, 7:38. Falcons 17–7. Drive: 10 plays, 78 yards, 4:16.
- ATL – Harry Douglas 37-yard pass from Matt Ryan (Matt Bryant kick), 5:32. Falcons 24–7. Drive: 1 play, 37 yards, 0:08.
- TB – Rian Lindell 36-yard field goal, 0:00. Falcons 24–10. Drive: 13 plays, 63 yards, 5:32.

Third quarter

- TB – Vincent Jackson 1-yard pass from Mike Glennon (Rian Lindell kick), 9:03. Falcons 24–17. Drive: 9 plays, 23 yards, 4:12.

Fourth quarter

- ATL – Jacquizz Rodgers 8-yard pass from Matt Ryan (Matt Bryant kick), 14:06. Falcons 31–17. Drive: 8 plays, 80 yards, 3:48.
- TB – Rian Lindell 41-yard field goal, 5:00. Falcons 31–20. Drive: 18 plays, 55 yards, 9:06.
- TB – Rian Lindell 35-yard field goal, 1:55. Falcons 31–23. Drive: 7 plays, 43 yards, 1:56.

Top passers

- TB – Mike Glennon – 26/44, 256 yards, 2 TD
- ATL – Matt Ryan – 20/26, 273 yards, 3 TD

Top rushers

- TB – Doug Martin – 11 rushes, 47 yards
- ATL – Jacquizz Rodgers – 8 rushes, 16 yards

Top receivers

- TB – Vincent Jackson – 10 receptions, 138 yards, 2 TD
- ATL – Harry Douglas – 7 receptions, 149 yards, TD

Falcons quarterback Matt Ryan threw for 273 yards and three touchdowns, as Atlanta defeated Tampa Bay 31–23. The Buccaneers attempted to rally in the fourth quarter, but managed only two field goals. A failed onside kick by Tampa Bay with 1:55 left sealed the win for Atlanta.

==== Week 8: vs. Carolina Panthers ====
Week Eight: Carolina Panthers at Tampa Bay Buccaneers – Game summary

Quarter	1	2	3	4	Total
Panthers	7	7	7	10	31
Buccaneers	3	3	0	7	13

at Raymond James Stadium, Tampa, Florida

- Date: October 24
- Game time: 8:25 p.m. EDT
- Game weather: Cloudy, 70 °F (21 °C)
- Game attendance: 59,073
- Referee: Jerome Boger
- TV announcers (NFLN): Brad Nessler, Mike Mayock and Alex Flanagan
- Recap, Game book

Game information

First quarter

- CAR – Greg Olsen 1-yard pass from Cam Newton (Graham Gano kick), 4:44. Panthers 7–0. Drive: 15 plays, 70 yards, 8:52.
- TB – Rian Lindell 47-yard field goal, 1:24. Panthers 7–3. Drive: 8 plays, 51 yards, 3:20.

Second quarter

- CAR – DeAngelo Williams 12-yard run (Graham Gano kick), 12:42. Panthers 14–3. Drive: 6 plays, 80 yards, 3:42.
- TB – Rian Lindell 48-yard field goal, 4:03. Panthers 14–6. Drive: 10 plays, 43 yards, 4:49.

Third quarter

- CAR – Cam Newton 6-yard run (Graham Gano kick), 6:27. Panthers 21–6. Drive: 9 plays, 53 yards, 4:36.

Fourth quarter

- CAR – Mike Tolbert 3-yard pass from Cam Newton (Graham Gano kick), 14:55. Panthers 28–6. Drive: 4 plays, 29 yards, 2:01.
- CAR – Graham Gano 29-yard field goal, 6:14. Panthers 31–6. Drive: 4 plays, 5 yards, 1:37.
- TB – Tim Wright 10-yard pass from Mike Glennon (Rian Lindell kick), 2:53. Panthers 31–13. Drive: 11 plays, 81 yards, 3:21.

Top passers

- CAR – Cam Newton – 23/32, 221 yards, 2 TD
- TB – Mike Glennon – 30/51, 275 yards, TD

Top rushers

- CAR – Cam Newton – 11 rushes, 50 yards, TD
- TB – Mike James – 10 rushes, 39 yards

Top receivers

- CAR – Ted Ginn Jr. – 5 receptions, 80 yards
- TB – Vincent Jackson – 5 receptions, 79 yards

Cam Newton threw for 221 yards and two touchdown passes, and rushed for another touchdown, as Carolina defeated Tampa Bay 31–13. The Buccaneers failed to enter the red zone until the final three minutes of the game. Doug Martin sat out the game with an injured shoulder.

With the loss, Tampa Bay fell to 0–7.

==== Week 9: at Seattle Seahawks ====
Week Nine: Tampa Bay Buccaneers at Seattle Seahawks – Game summary

Quarter	1	2	3	4	OT	Total
Buccaneers	0	21	3	0	0	24
Seahawks	0	7	7	10	3	27

at CenturyLink Field, Seattle, Washington

- Date: November 3
- Game time: 4:05 p.m. EST/1:05 p.m. PST
- Game weather: Sunny, 48 °F (9 °C)
- Game attendance: 67,873
- Referee: Mike Carey
- TV announcers (Fox): Kenny Albert, Daryl Johnston and Tony Siragusa
- Recap, Game book

Game information

First quarter

- No scoring plays.

Second quarter

- TB – Tim Wright 12-yard pass from Mike Glennon (Rian Lindell kick), 11:50. Buccaneers 7–0. Drive: 10 plays, 90 yards, 6:03.
- TB – Tiquan Underwood 20-yard pass from Mike Glennon (Rian Lindell kick), 2:55. Buccaneers 14–0. Drive: 11 plays, 84 yards, 6:42.
- TB – Tom Crabtree 2-yard pass from Mike James (Rian Lindell kick), 2:16. Buccaneers 21–0. Drive: 2 plays, 31 yards, 0:30.
- SEA – Jermaine Kearse 16-yard pass from Russell Wilson (Steven Hauschka kick), 1:40. Buccaneers 21–7. Drive: 3 plays, 80 yards, 0:36.

Third quarter

- TB – Rian Lindell 33-yard field goal, 9:48. Buccaneers 24–7. Drive: 11 plays, 65 yards, 5:12.
- SEA – Russell Wilson 10-yard run (Steven Hauschka kick), 5:00. Buccaneers 24–14. Drive: 9 plays, 86 yards, 4:48.

Fourth quarter

- SEA – Steven Hauschka 36-yard field goal, 14:47. Buccaneers 24–17. Drive: 4 plays, 7 yards, 1:11.
- SEA – Doug Baldwin 10-yard pass from Russell Wilson (Steven Hauschka kick), 1:51. Tied 24–24. Drive: 10 plays, 59 yards, 4:22.

Overtime

- SEA – Steven Hauschka 27-yard field goal, 8:11. Seahawks 27–24. Drive: 9 plays, 51 yards, 4:53.

Top passers

- TB – Mike Glennon – 17/23, 168 yards, 2 TD
- SEA – Russell Wilson – 19/26, 217 yards, 2 TD, 2 INT

Top rushers

- TB – Mike James – 28 rushes, 158 yards
- SEA – Marshawn Lynch – 21 rushes, 125 yards

Top receivers

- TB – Tim Wright – 4 receptions, 58 yards, TD
- SEA – Doug Baldwin – 6 receptions, 75 yards, TD

Winless Tampa Bay shocked 7-1 Seattle by jumping out to a 21–0 lead just before halftime. However, the Seahawks came back in the second half to tie the game and force overtime. Tampa Bay won the coin toss in overtime, but went 3-and-out on their first possession. Seattle kicked a field goal on the next possession, completing their greatest comeback (21 points) in franchise history.

This loss dropped the Buccaneers to 0–8 on the season, a feat shared with the Jacksonville Jaguars.

==== Week 10: vs. Miami Dolphins ====
Week Ten: Miami Dolphins at Tampa Bay Buccaneers – Game summary

Quarter	1	2	3	4	Total
Dolphins	0	7	12	0	19
Buccaneers	10	5	0	7	22

at Raymond James Stadium, Tampa, Florida

- Date: November 11
- Game time: 8:40 p.m. EST
- Game weather: Sunny, 73 °F (23 °C)
- Game attendance: 64,448
- Referee: Jeff Triplette
- TV announcers (ESPN): Mike Tirico, Jon Gruden and Lisa Salters
- Recap, Game book

Game information

First quarter

- TB – Donald Penn 1-yard pass from Mike Glennon (Rian Lindell kick), 9:37. Buccaneers 7–0. Drive: 9 plays, 76 yards, 5:23.
- TB – Rian Lindell 24-yard field goal, 5:27. Buccaneers 10–0. Drive: 6 plays, 34 yards, 2:40.

Second quarter

- TB – Daniel Thomas tackled in the end zone by Lavonte David for a safety, 13:52. Buccaneers 12–0.
- TB – Rian Lindell 35-yard field goal, 9:01. Buccaneers 15–0. Drive: 8 plays, 41 yards, 4:51.
- MIA – Rishard Matthews 6-yard pass from Ryan Tannehill (Caleb Sturgis kick), 0:28. Buccaneers 15–7. Drive: 9 plays, 90 yards, 3:26.

Third quarter

- MIA – Caleb Sturgis 40-yard field goal, 7:57. Buccaneers 15–10. Drive: 4 plays, 7 yards, 1:33.
- MIA – Rishard Matthews 19-yard pass from Ryan Tannehill (pass failed), 2:01. Dolphins 16–15. Drive: 5 plays, 41 yards, 2:06.
- MIA – Caleb Sturgis 30-yard field goal, 0:10. Dolphins 19–15. Drive: 4 plays, −5 yards, 1:24.

Fourth quarter

- TB – Bobby Rainey 1-yard run (Rian Lindell kick), 10:19. Buccaneers 22–19. Drive: 9 plays, 80 yards, 4:51.

Top passers

- MIA – Ryan Tannehill – 27/42, 229 yards, 2 TD, INT
- TB – Mike Glennon – 11/21, 139 yards, TD, INT

Top rushers

- MIA – Ryan Tannehill – 1 rush, 2 yards
- TB – Brian Leonard – 20 rushes, 57 yards

Top receivers

- MIA – Rishard Matthews – 11 receptions, 120 yards, 2 TD
- TB – Tiquan Underwood – 3 receptions, 64 yards

The Buccaneers defense allowed a franchise low 2 rushing yards for the entire game, besting the previous record set last season during the home opener, when the Buccaneers' rushing defense held Carolina to 10 rushing yards. Darrelle Revis caught the game winning interception off a desperation pass from Dolphins QB Ryan Tannehill late in the fourth quarter, and the Buccaneers won their first game of the season.

==== Week 11: vs. Atlanta Falcons ====
Week Eleven: Atlanta Falcons at Tampa Bay Buccaneers – Game summary

Quarter	1	2	3	4	Total
Falcons	0	6	7	15	28
Buccaneers	3	21	14	3	41

at Raymond James Stadium, Tampa, Florida

- Date: November 17
- Game time: 1:00 p.m. EST
- Game weather: Cloudy, 79 °F (26 °C)
- Game attendance: 55,360
- Referee: Ed Hochuli
- TV announcers (Fox): Sam Rosen, Heath Evans and Peter Schrager
- Recap, Game book

Game information

First quarter

- TB – Rian Lindell 30-yard field goal, 1:45. Buccaneers 3–0. Drive: 15 plays, 73 yards, 7:06.

Second quarter

- ATL – Matt Bryant 46-yard field goal, 12:07. Tied 3–3. Drive: 10 plays, 53 yards, 4:38.
- TB – Bobby Rainey 43-yard run (Rian Lindell kick), 10:14. Buccaneers 10–3. Drive: 4 plays, 81 yards, 1:53.
- TB – Mason Foster 37-yard interception return (Rian Lindell kick), 7:05. Buccaneers 17–3.
- TB – Bobby Rainey 3-yard run (Rian Lindell kick), 3:16. Buccaneers 24–3. Drive: 5 plays, 53 yards, 1:46.
- ATL – Matt Bryant 49-yard field goal, 0:56. Buccaneers 24–6. Drive: 8 plays, 49 yards, 2:20.

Third quarter

- TB – Bobby Rainey 4-yard pass from Mike Glennon (Rian Lindell kick), 9:34. Buccaneers 31–6. Drive: 4 plays, 67 yards, 2:02.
- TB – Vincent Jackson 3-yard pass from Mike Glennon (Rian Lindell kick), 1:54. Buccaneers 38–6. Drive: 7 plays, 20 yards, 3:49.
- ATL – Harry Douglas 80-yard pass from Matt Ryan (Matt Bryant kick), 1:02. Buccaneers 38–13. Drive: 2 plays, 80 yards, 0:52.

Fourth quarter

- TB – Rian Lindell 46-yard field goal, 7:15. Buccaneers 41–13. Drive: 9 plays, 27 yards, 6:11.
- ATL – Antone Smith 50-yard run (Dominique Davis–Tony Gonzalez pass), 5:22. Buccaneers 41–21. Drive: 6 plays, 80 yards, 1:53.
- ATL – Roddy White 6-yard pass from Matt Ryan (Matt Bryant kick), 1:45. Buccaneers 41–28. Drive: 8 plays, 80 yards, 1:55.

Top passers

- ATL – Matt Ryan – 19/36, 254 yards, 2 TD, 2 INT
- TB – Mike Glennon – 20/23, 231 yards, 2 TD

Top rushers

- ATL – Antone Smith – 2 rushes, 88 yards, TD
- TB – Bobby Rainey – 30 rushes, 163 yards, 2 TD

Top receivers

- ATL – Harry Douglas – 6 receptions, 134 yards, TD
- TB – Vincent Jackson – 10 receptions, 165 yards, TD

The Buccaneers managed a comprehensive victory against the Falcons, improving their record to 2–8.

Bobby Rainey rushed for 163 yards and 2 touchdowns. Vincent Jackson caught 10 passes for 165 yards and a touchdown. Gerald McCoy had 3 sacks in the game. Mike Glennon threw for 2 touchdowns. Mason Foster and Dashon Goldson both had an interception, the former of which returned it for a touchdown. Dekoda Watson blocked a punt.

==== Week 12: at Detroit Lions ====
Week Twelve: Tampa Bay Buccaneers at Detroit Lions – Game summary

Quarter	1	2	3	4	Total
Buccaneers	3	14	0	7	24
Lions	0	14	7	0	21

at Ford Field, Detroit, Michigan

- Date: November 24
- Game time: 1:00 p.m. EST
- Game weather: None (indoor stadium)
- Game attendance: 62,098
- Referee: Clete Blakeman
- TV announcers (Fox): Thom Brennaman, Brian Billick and Laura Okmin
- Recap, Game book

Game information

First quarter

- TB – Rian Lindell 38-yard field goal, 3:27. Buccaneers 3–0. Drive: 13 plays, 58 yards, 7:51.

Second quarter

- DET – Nate Burleson 5-yard pass from Matthew Stafford (David Akers kick), 11:54. Lions 7–3. Drive: 11 plays, 80 yards, 6:33.
- TB – Tiquan Underwood 7-yard pass from Mike Glennon (Rian Lindell kick), 8:50. Buccaneers 10–7. Drive: 6 plays, 80 yards, 3:08.
- DET – Joseph Fauria 10-yard pass from Matthew Stafford (David Akers kick), 4:38. Lions 14–10. Drive: 7 plays, 80 yards, 4:09.
- TB – Leonard Johnson 48-yard interception return (Rian Lindell kick), 1:01. Buccaneers 17–14.

Third quarter

- DET – Brandon Pettigrew 18-yard pass from Matthew Stafford (David Akers kick), 9:41. Lions 21–17. Drive: 8 plays, 69 yards, 3:53.

Fourth quarter

- TB – Tiquan Underwood 85-yard pass from Mike Glennon (Rian Lindell kick), 14:17. Buccaneers 24–21. Drive: 4 plays, 95 yards, 1:42.

Top passers

- TB – Mike Glennon – 14/21, 247 yards, 2 TD
- DET – Matthew Stafford – 26/46, 297 yards, 3 TD, 4 INT

Top rushers

- TB – Bobby Rainey – 18 rushes, 35 yards
- DET – Reggie Bush – 15 rushes, 83 yards

Top receivers

- TB – Tiquan Underwood – 3 receptions, 108 yards, 2 TD
- DET – Calvin Johnson – 7 receptions, 115 yards

Lions quarterback Matthew Stafford threw four interceptions, as Tampa Bay upset Detroit 24–21. The Buccaneers became the first team since 1978 to start the season 0–8 and win their next three games. Stafford was leading the Lions on a potential game-winning or game-tying drive in the final minute. At the Tampa Bay 28 yard line with 1:00 left, Stafford threw to Calvin Johnson at the 3 yard line. Johnson appeared to catch the ball, but it was stripped out and fell into the hands of Johnthan Banks for an interception, and sealed the win for Tampa Bay.

==== Week 13: at Carolina Panthers ====
Week Thirteen: Tampa Bay Buccaneers at Carolina Panthers – Game summary

Quarter	1	2	3	4	Total
Buccaneers	6	0	0	0	6
Panthers	7	10	7	3	27

at Bank of America Stadium, Charlotte, North Carolina

- Date: December 1
- Game time: 1:00 p.m. EST
- Game weather: Partly cloudy, 56 °F (13 °C)
- Game attendance: 72,795
- Referee: Ron Winter
- TV announcers (Fox): Chris Myers, Tim Ryan and Jennifer Hale
- Recap, Game book

Game information

First quarter

- TB – Rian Lindell 27-yard field goal, 9:14. Buccaneers 3–0. Drive: 8 plays, 59 yards, 4:27.
- CAR – Brandon LaFell 16-yard pass from Cam Newton (Graham Gano kick), 6:15. Panthers 7–3. Drive: 5 plays, 83 yards, 3:02.
- TB – Rian Lindell 53-yard field goal, 2:19. Panthers 7–6. Drive: 4 plays, −3 yards, 2:26.

Second quarter

- CAR – Graham Gano 23-yard field goal, 6:26. Panthers 10–6. Drive: 14 plays, 76 yards, 6:05.
- CAR – Cam Newton 1-yard run (Graham Gano kick), 0:30. Panthers 17–6. Drive: 7 plays, 49 yards, 3:45.

Third quarter

- CAR – Ted Ginn 36-yard pass from Cam Newton (Graham Gano kick), 10:58. Panthers 24–6. Drive: 4 plays, 78 yards, 2:10.

Fourth quarter

- CAR – Graham Gano 22-yard field goal, 6:43. Panthers 27–6. Drive: 13 plays, 66 yards, 8:45.

Top passers

- TB – Mike Glennon – 14/21, 180 yards, INT
- CAR – Cam Newton – 18/29, 263 yards, 2 TD, 2 INT

Top rushers

- TB – Bobby Rainey – 17 rushes, 63 yards
- CAR – Cam Newton – 5 rushes, 68 yards, TD

Top receivers

- TB – Vincent Jackson – 3 receptions, 75 yards
- CAR – Greg Olsen – 5 receptions, 85 yards

Panthers QB Cam Newton threw for 263 yards and two touchdowns while running for another touchdown, as Carolina soundly defeated Tampa Bay 27–6, sweeping the season series.

With the loss, the Buccaneers were mathematically eliminated from playoff contention.

==== Week 14: vs. Buffalo Bills ====
Week Fourteen: Buffalo Bills at Tampa Bay Buccaneers – Game summary

Quarter	1	2	3	4	Total
Bills	3	0	3	0	6
Buccaneers	14	10	3	0	27

at Raymond James Stadium, Tampa, Florida

- Date: December 8
- Game time: 1:00 p.m. EST
- Game weather: Cloudy, 82 °F (28 °C)
- Game attendance: 59,194
- Referee: Bill Vinovich
- TV announcers (CBS): Spero Dedes and Steve Beuerlein
- Recap, Game book

Game information

First quarter

- TB – Bobby Rainey 80-yard run (Rian Lindell kick), 14:42. Buccaneers 7–0. Drive: 2 plays, 80 yards, 0:18.
- BUF – Dan Carpenter 40-yard field goal, 8:12. Buccaneers 7–3. Drive: 7 plays, 36 yards, 2:29.
- TB – Vincent Jackson 38-yard pass from Mike Glennon (Rian Lindell kick), 2:47. Buccaneers 14–3. Drive: 9 plays, 80 yards, 5:33.

Second quarter

- TB – Rian Lindell 53-yard field goal, 10:52. Buccaneers 17–3. Drive: 4 plays, 6 yards, 1:32.
- TB – Tim Wright 5-yard pass from Mike Glennon (Rian Lindell kick), 0:20. Buccaneers 24–3. Drive: 10 plays, 57 yards, 4:31.

Third quarter

- BUF – Dan Carpenter 46-yard field goal, 10:25. Buccaneers 24–6. Drive: 9 plays, 52 yards, 4:41.
- TB – Rian Lindell 32-yard field goal, 0:11. Buccaneers 27–6. Drive: 4 plays, −2 yards, 0:54.

Fourth quarter

- No scoring plays.

Top passers

- BUF – EJ Manuel – 18/33, 184 yards, 4 INT
- TB – Mike Glennon – 9/25, 90 yards, 2 TD, 2 INT

Top rushers

- BUF – EJ Manuel – 5 rushes, 29 yards
- TB – Bobby Rainey – 22 rushes, 127 yards, TD

Top receivers

- BUF – Stevie Johnson – 5 receptions, 67 yards
- TB – Vincent Jackson – 3 receptions, 70 yards, TD

Bobby Rainey scored an 80-yard rushing touchdown on the second play of the game and rushed for 127 yards total, setting the tone for the Buccaneers' decisive 27-6 thrashing of the Buffalo Bills.

On offense, Mike Glennon threw two touchdown passes, one each to Vincent Jackson and Tim Wright. The Buccaneers defense had seven sacks and four interceptions, out of which Lavonte David made one sack and two interceptions. On special teams, Dashon Goldson recovered a fumble muffed by the punt returner.

==== Week 15: vs. San Francisco 49ers ====
Week Fifteen: San Francisco 49ers at Tampa Bay Buccaneers – Game summary

Quarter	1	2	3	4	Total
49ers	7	10	3	13	33
Buccaneers	0	7	0	7	14

at Raymond James Stadium, Tampa, Florida

- Date: December 15
- Game time: 1:00 p.m. EST
- Game weather: Cloudy, 70 °F (21 °C)
- Game attendance: 64,142
- Referee: Scott Green
- TV announcers (Fox): Dick Stockton, Ronde Barber and Kris Budden
- Recap, Game book

Game information

First quarter

- SF – Michael Crabtree 4-yard pass from Colin Kaepernick (Phil Dawson kick), 7:05. 49ers 7–0. Drive: 11 plays, 62 yards, 6:56.

Second quarter

- SF – Phil Dawson 47-yard field goal, 6:12. 49ers 10–0. Drive: 9 plays, 28 yards, 4:45.
- SF – Vernon Davis 52-yard pass from Colin Kaepernick (Phil Dawson kick), 1:47. 49ers 17–0. Drive: 5 plays, 81 yards, 1:52.
- TB – Vincent Jackson 11-yard pass from Mike Glennon (Rian Lindell kick), 0:29. 49ers 17–7. Drive: 7 plays, 80 yards, 1:18.

Third quarter

- SF – Phil Dawson 43-yard field goal, 7:51. 49ers 20–7. Drive: 8 plays, 19 yards, 2:59.

Fourth quarter

- TB – Tim Wright 24-yard pass from Mike Glennon (Rian Lindell kick), 14:54. 49ers 20–14. Drive: 10 plays, 92 yards, 4:01.
- SF – Phil Dawson 21-yard field goal, 4:27. 49ers 23–14. Drive: 17 plays, 77 yards, 10:27.
- SF – Kendall Hunter 2-yard fumble return (Phil Dawson kick), 4:21. 49ers 30–14.
- SF – Phil Dawson 35-yard field goal, 2:49. 49ers 33–14. Drive: 4 plays, 9 yards, 0:55.

Top passers

- SF – Colin Kaepernick – 19/29, 203 yards, 2 TD
- TB – Mike Glennon – 18/34, 179 yards, 2 TD, INT

Top rushers

- SF – Frank Gore – 22 rushes, 86 yards
- TB – Bobby Rainey – 11 rushes, 27 yards

Top receivers

- SF – Vernon Davis – 5 receptions, 79 yards, TD
- TB – Tim Wright – 7 receptions, 82 yards, TD

Vincent Jackson and Tim Wright caught the only two touchdowns for the Buccaneers in the game, which were not enough to stop the 49ers from trouncing the team 33–14. On defense, Gerald McCoy and Adrian Clayborn had the only sacks for the Bucs. Late in the game, Eric Page attempted to hand the ball to Russell Shepard on a tricky play during a kick return; however, Shepard fumbled the ball, allowing the 49ers' Kendall Hunter to recover and return it for a touchdown.

With the loss, the Buccaneers' record dropped to 4–10.

==== Week 16: at St. Louis Rams ====
Week Sixteen: Tampa Bay Buccaneers at St. Louis Rams – Game summary

Quarter	1	2	3	4	Total
Buccaneers	7	3	3	0	13
Rams	0	14	3	6	23

at Edward Jones Dome, St. Louis, Missouri

- Date: December 22
- Game time: 1:00 p.m. EST/12:00 p.m. CST
- Game weather: None (indoor stadium)
- Game attendance: 54,423
- Referee: John Parry
- TV announcers (Fox): Thom Brennaman, Brian Billick and Laura Okmin
- Recap, Game book

Game information

First quarter

- TB – Bobby Rainey 1-yard run (Rian Lindell kick), 6:31. Buccaneers 7–0. Drive: 11 plays, 85 yards, 4:37.

Second quarter

- STL – Zac Stacy 1-yard run (Greg Zuerlein kick), 13:48. Tied 7–7. Drive: 13 plays, 80 yards, 7:43.
- STL – Stedman Bailey 27-yard run (Greg Zuerlein kick), 12:04. Rams 14–7. Drive: 1 play, 27 yards, 0:09.
- TB – Rian Lindell 35-yard field goal, 0:00. Rams 14–10. Drive: 9 plays, 36 yards, 4:27.

Third quarter

- TB – Rian Lindell 32-yard field goal, 9:23. Rams 14–13. Drive: 9 plays, 51 yards, 3:55.
- STL – Greg Zuerlein 54-yard field goal, 5:08. Rams 17–13. Drive: 7 plays, 29 yards, 4:15.

Fourth quarter

- STL – Greg Zuerlein 25-yard field goal, 11:15. Rams 20–13. Drive: 12 plays, 49 yards, 6:33.
- STL – Greg Zuerlein 48-yard field goal, 3:15. Rams 23–13. Drive: 9 plays, 29 yards, 5:52.

Top passers

- TB – Mike Glennon – 16/26, 158 yards
- STL – Kellen Clemens – 16/20, 158 yards

Top rushers

- TB – Bobby Rainey – 20 rushes, 37 yards, TD
- STL – Zac Stacy – 33 rushes, 104 yards, TD

Top receivers

- TB – Vincent Jackson – 5 receptions, 98 yards
- STL – Stedman Bailey – 3 receptions, 44 yards

On offense, Bobby Rainey scored the Bucs' only touchdown of the game. On defense, Gerald McCoy had a sack. Also Adrian Clayborn and Dekoda Watson both forced fumbles which Lavonte David and Keith Tandy both successfully recovered for the Buccaneers, though the offense was only able to get a field goal out of the resulting possessions.

==== Week 17: at New Orleans Saints ====
Week Seventeen: Tampa Bay Buccaneers at New Orleans Saints – Game summary

Quarter	1	2	3	4	Total
Buccaneers	7	7	3	0	17
Saints	14	14	7	7	42

at Mercedes-Benz Superdome, New Orleans, Louisiana

- Date: December 29
- Game time: 4:25 p.m. EST/3:25 p.m. CST
- Game weather: None (indoor stadium)
- Game attendance: 73,150
- Referee: Carl Cheffers
- TV announcers (Fox): Thom Brennaman, Brian Billick and Laura Okmin
- Recap, Game book

Game information

First quarter

- NO – Lance Moore 44-yard pass from Drew Brees (Shayne Graham kick), 10:15. Saints 7–0. Drive: 9 plays, 80 yards, 4:45.
- TB – Tiquan Underwood 48-yard pass from Mike Glennon (Rian Lindell kick), 8:40. Tied 7–7. Drive: 4 plays, 62 yards, 1:35.
- NO – Jimmy Graham 10-yard pass from Drew Brees (Shayne Graham kick), 3:08. Saints 14–7. Drive: 9 plays, 80 yards, 5:32.

Second quarter

- NO – Robert Meachem 41-yard pass from Drew Brees (Shayne Graham kick), 8:04. Saints 21–7. Drive: 5 plays, 57 yards, 1:29.
- TB – Tim Wright 1-yard pass from Mike Glennon (Rian Lindell kick), 3:28. Saints 21–14. Drive: 9 plays, 80 yards, 4:36.
- NO – Kenny Stills 76-yard pass from Drew Brees (Shayne Graham kick), 2:40. Saints 28–14. Drive: 3 plays, 80 yards, 0:48.

Third quarter

- TB – Rian Lindell 54-yard field goal, 6:35. Saints 28–17. Drive: 13 plays, 44 yards, 8:25.
- NO – Pierre Thomas 8-yard run (Shayne Graham kick), 1:22. Saints 35–17. Drive: 10 plays, 92 yards, 5:13.

Fourth quarter

- NO – Drew Brees 9-yard run (Shayne Graham kick), 14:08. Saints 42–17. Drive: 4 plays, 25 yards, 2:05.

Top passers

- TB – Mike Glennon – 22/41, 219 yards, 2 TD, INT
- NO – Drew Brees – 24/31, 381 yards, 4 TD

Top rushers

- TB – Brian Leonard – 5 rushes, 35 yards
- NO – Khiry Robinson – 12 rushes, 50 yards

Top receivers

- TB – Tiquan Underwood – 5 receptions, 93 yards, TD
- NO – Kenny Stills – 1 reception, 76 yards, TD

=== Standings ===
==== Division ====
NFC South
	W	L	T	PCT	DIV	CONF	PF	PA	STK
^{(2)} Carolina Panthers	12	4	0	.750	5–1	9–3	366	241	W3
^{(6)} New Orleans Saints	11	5	0	.688	5–1	9–3	414	304	W1
Atlanta Falcons	4	12	0	.250	1–5	3–9	353	443	L2
Tampa Bay Buccaneers	4	12	0	.250	1–5	2–10	288	389	L3

==== Conference ====
NFC
#	Team	Division	W	L	T	PCT	DIV	CONF	SOS	SOV	STK
Division winners
1	Seattle Seahawks	West	13	3	0	.813	4–2	10–2	.490	.445	W1
2	Carolina Panthers	South	12	4	0	.750	5–1	9–3	.494	.451	W3
3	Philadelphia Eagles	East	10	6	0	.625	4–2	9–3	.453	.391	W2
4	Green Bay Packers	North	8	7	1	.531	3–2–1	6–5–1	.453	.371	W1
Wild cards
5	San Francisco 49ers	West	12	4	0	.750	5–1	9–3	.494	.414	W6
6	New Orleans Saints	South	11	5	0	.688	5–1	9–3	.516	.455	W1
Did not qualify for the postseason
7	Arizona Cardinals	West	10	6	0	.625	2–4	6–6	.531	.444	L1
8 (Note: Chicago defeated Dallas head-to-head (Week 14, 45–28).)	Chicago Bears	North	8	8	0	.500	2–4	4–8	.465	.469	L2
9	Dallas Cowboys	East	8	8	0	.500	5–1	7–5	.484	.363	L1
10 (Note: The NY Giants and Detroit finished with a better conference record than St. Louis.) (Note: The NY Giants defeated Detroit head-to-head (Week 16, 23–20 (OT)).)	New York Giants	East	7	9	0	.438	3–3	6–6	.520	.366	W2
11 (Note: Detroit finished with a better conference record than St. Louis.)	Detroit Lions	North	7	9	0	.438	4–2	6–6	.457	.402	L4
12	St. Louis Rams	West	7	9	0	.438	1–5	4–8	.551	.446	L1
13	Minnesota Vikings	North	5	10	1	.344	2–3–1	4–7–1	.512	.450	W1
14 (Note: Atlanta finished with a better conference record than Tampa Bay.)	Atlanta Falcons	South	4	12	0	.250	1–5	3–9	.553	.313	L2
15	Tampa Bay Buccaneers	South	4	12	0	.250	1–5	2–10	.574	.391	L3
16	Washington Redskins	East	3	13	0	.188	0–6	1–11	.516	.438	L8
Tiebreakers (Note: When breaking ties for three or more teams under the NFL's rules, they are first broken within divisions, then comparing only the highest-ranked remaining team from each division.)

== See also ==
- List of other NFL teams affected by internal conflict
