= C. J. Roberts =

C. J. Roberts may refer to:

- John Roberts, Chief Justice of the United States (from 2005)
- C. J. Roberts (One Life to Live), a character on soap opera One Life to Live
- C. J. Roberts (cornerback) (born 1991), American football cornerback
- C. J. Roberts (1846-1925), Australian politician
