= Doug Martin (running back) =

American football player (1989–2025)

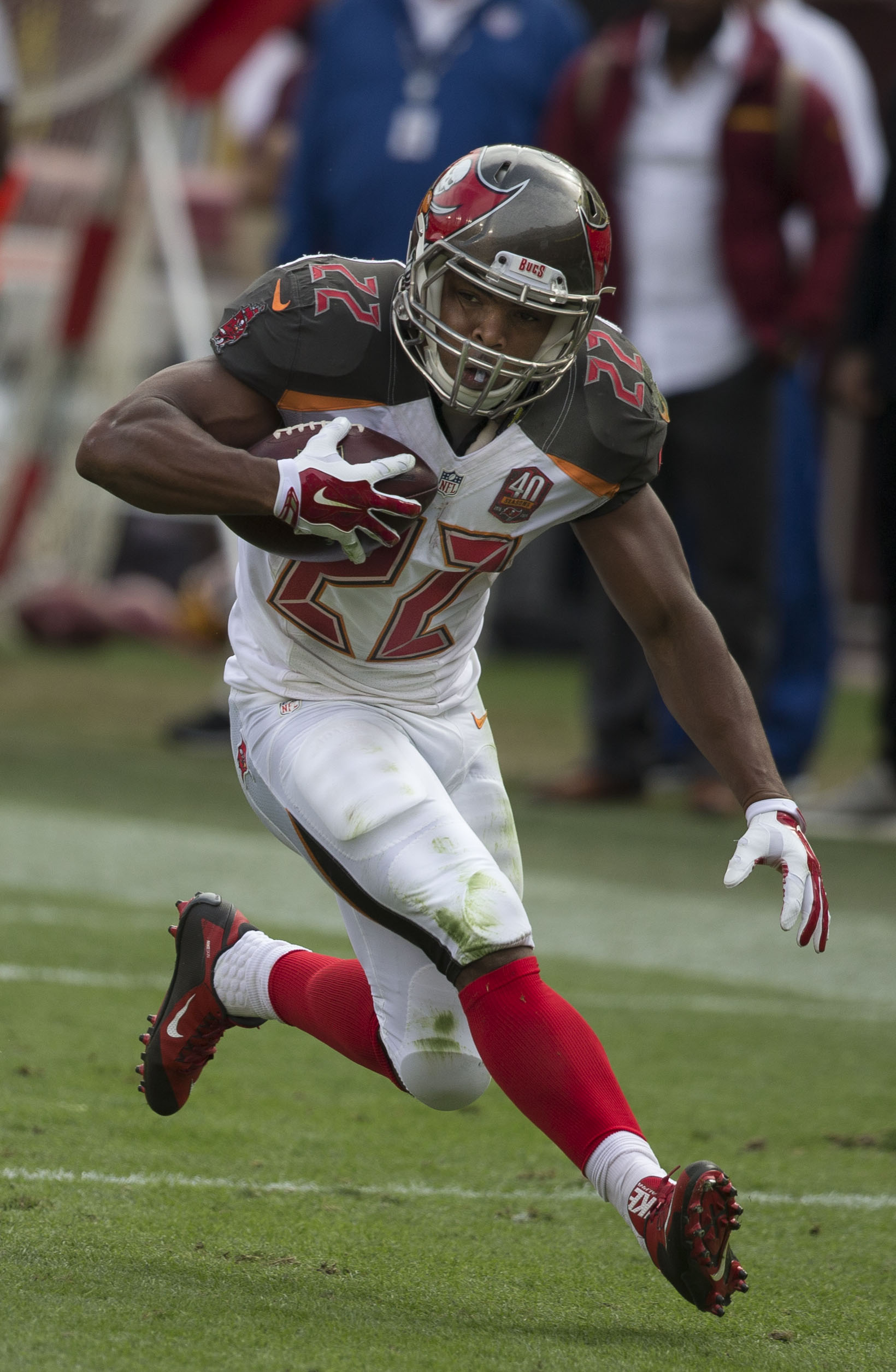
- Martin with the Tampa Bay Buccaneers in 2015

No. 22, 28
- Position: Running back

Personal information
- Born: January 13, 1989; Oakland, California, U.S.
- Died: October 18, 2025 (aged 36); Oakland, California, U.S.
- Listed height: 5 ft 9 in (1.75 m)
- Listed weight: 223 lb (101 kg)

Career information
- High school: St. Mary's (Stockton, California)
- College: Boise State (2007–2011)
- NFL draft: 2012: 1st round, 31st overall pick

Career history
- Tampa Bay Buccaneers (2012–2017); Oakland Raiders (2018)

Awards and highlights
- First-team All-Pro (2015); 2× Pro Bowl (2012, 2015); PFWA All-Rookie Team (2012); First-team All-MWC (2011)

Career NFL statistics
- Rushing yards: 5,356
- Rushing average: 4.1
- Rushing touchdowns: 30
- Receptions: 148
- Receiving yards: 1,207
- Receiving touchdowns: 2
- Stats at Pro Football Reference

Douglas Martin (January 13, 1989 – October 18, 2025) was an American professional football player who was a running back for seven seasons in the National Football League (NFL), primarily with the Tampa Bay Buccaneers. He played college football for the Boise State Broncos and was selected by the Buccaneers in the first round of the 2012 NFL draft.

Martin spent his first six seasons with the Buccaneers. In addition to a Pro Bowl selection during his rookie season, Martin was selected to his second Pro Bowl in 2015, in which he was also named a first-team All-Pro. He struggled with injuries and regressive play over the next two seasons, before being released by the Buccaneers after the 2017 season. He subsequently played his final season with the Oakland Raiders in 2018.

== Early life ==
Martin was born on January 13, 1989, in Oakland, California, and grew up in Stockton, where he attended St. Mary's High School. Martin was a letterman in football and track. As a junior, he rushed 228 times for 1,950 yards and 18 touchdowns, earning first-team all-selection and all-area honors by the Stockton Record and All-San Joaquin accolades by Comcast Sports. During his senior season, Martin rushed for 1,234 yards on 171 carries and 14 touchdowns winning the team's most valuable player (MVP) award.

In track & field, Martin recorded a personal-best time of 11.15 seconds in the 100-meter dash as a senior. He also had top-jumps of 6.69 meters (21 ft, 11 in) in the long jump and 13.20 meters (43 ft, 3 in) in the triple jump.

Martin had interest from bigger college programs such as California and Oregon State, but committed to Boise State on December 14, 2006. The Broncos were the only Division I program that offered him a scholarship.

== College career ==
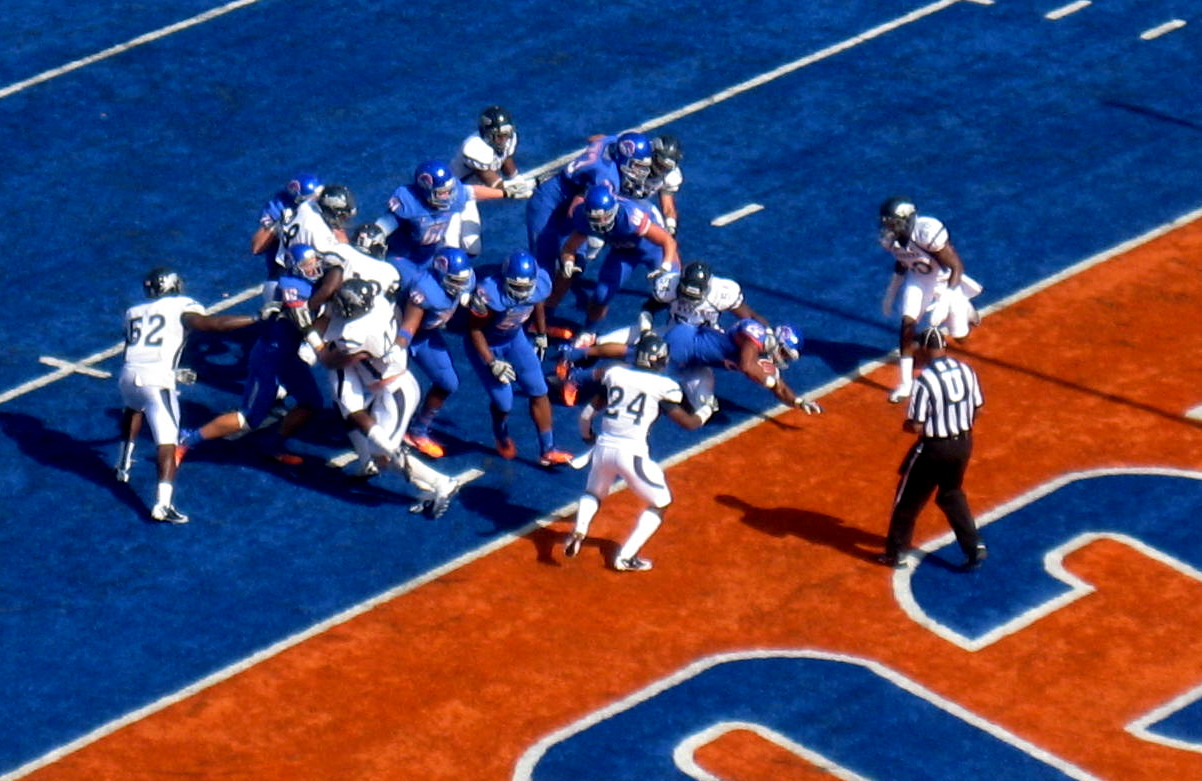
Martin (center) dives for a touchdown while playing for Boise State.

Martin attended Boise State University from 2007 to 2011. He finished his college career with 3,431 yards on 617 carries with 43 touchdowns.

Martin made his collegiate debut on September 27, 2007, against Southern Miss, his lone appearance of the season.

In the 2008 season, Martin had 107 rushing yards and three receptions for 54 yards to go along with 10 kick returns for 223 net yards.

Martin's role expanded in the 2009 season. On September 12, against the Miami RedHawks, he had 28 rushing yards and two rushing touchdowns. On September 26, against Bowling Green, Martin had 116 rushing yards and a rushing touchdown. On October 14, in a game at Tulsa, he had 112 rushing yards. On November 20, against Utah State, Martin had 121 rushing yards and four rushing touchdowns. He followed that up with 128 rushing yards in a victory over Nevada. On December 5, against New Mexico State, Martin had 83 rushing yards and his second game with four rushing touchdowns in the 2009 season. Overall, in the 2009 season, Martin finished with 769 rushing yards, 15 rushing touchdowns, eight receptions, and 68 receiving yards.

As a junior in 2010, Martin continued to contribute for the Broncos. On September 18, against Wyoming, he had 105 rushing yards, one rushing touchdown, and two receptions for 40 yards. Martin followed that up with 138 rushing yards and 35 receiving yards in a victory over Oregon State. On October 26, against Louisiana Tech, he had 150 rushing yards and two rushing touchdowns in the victory. On November 12, in a game at Idaho, Martin had 117 rushing yards and two rushing touchdowns. On November 26, in a game at Nevada, he had 152 rushing yards and two rushing touchdowns to go along with three receptions for 78 yards and a receiving touchdown. On December 22, in the 2010 Maaco Bowl against Utah, Martin had 147 rushing yards and a rushing touchdown in the victory. Overall, he finished the 2010 season with 1,260 rushing yards, 12 rushing touchdowns, 28 receptions, 338 receiving yards, and two receiving touchdowns.

As a senior in 2011, Martin remained the Broncos' catalyst of their rushing attack. In the season opening victory over the Georgia Bulldogs, he had 57 rushing yards and a rushing touchdown. In the next game at Toledo, Martin had 70 rushing yards to go along with five receptions for 122 receiving yards and a touchdown. On October 1, against Nevada, he had 126 rushing yards and two rushing touchdowns. On October 15, against Colorado State, Martin had 200 rushing yards and three rushing touchdowns in the victory. He followed that up with 125 rushing yards, a rushing touchdown, and a two-yard receiving touchdown in the game against Air Force. On November 19, against San Diego State, Martin had 129 rushing yards and two rushing touchdowns. In the next game, against Wyoming, he had 153 rushing yards and two rushing touchdowns. Martin followed that up with 110 rushing yards and two rushing touchdowns against New Mexico. He was the MVP of the 2011 Maaco Bowl Las Vegas after returning the opening kickoff 100 yards for a touchdown and rushing for 151 yards and a touchdown. Martin finished his final collegiate season with 1,299 rushing yards, 16 rushing touchdowns, 28 receptions, 255 receiving yards, and two receiving touchdowns. Throughout his college career, Martin started 25 of 51 games at Boise State and was a first-team All-Mountain West Conference selection in 2011 and All-Western Athletic Conference in 2010. Martin ranks third in school history with 43 rushing touchdowns and 48 total touchdowns, fifth with 3,431 rushing yards and sixth with 617 rushing attempts. He was nicknamed "Muscle Hamster" by his Boise State teammates due to his strength and small size.

== Professional career ==
Pre-draft measurables
Height	Weight	Arm length	Hand span	Wingspan	40-yard dash	10-yard split	20-yard split	20-yard shuttle	Three-cone drill	Vertical jump	Broad jump	Bench press
5 ft 9 1/4 in (1.76 m)	223 lb (101 kg)	30 1/2 in (0.77 m)	9 in (0.23 m)	6 ft 0 3/4 in (1.85 m)	4.55 s	1.64 s	2.69 s	4.16 s	6.79 s	36 in (0.91 m)	10 ft 0 in (3.05 m)	28 reps
All values from NFL Combine

=== Tampa Bay Buccaneers ===
==== 2012 season ====
The Tampa Bay Buccaneers selected Martin in the first round with the 31st overall pick of the 2012 NFL draft, making him the first player from Boise State University to be drafted by the Buccaneers. Martin was the second running back to be selected that year. On June 4, 2012, he signed a five-year contract, worth $6.787 million with the team. After a successful 2012 preseason with the Buccaneers, where he rushed for 97 yards on 27 carries to go with two rushing touchdowns, Martin was officially named as the team's starting running back entering the 2012 regular season by coach Greg Schiano.

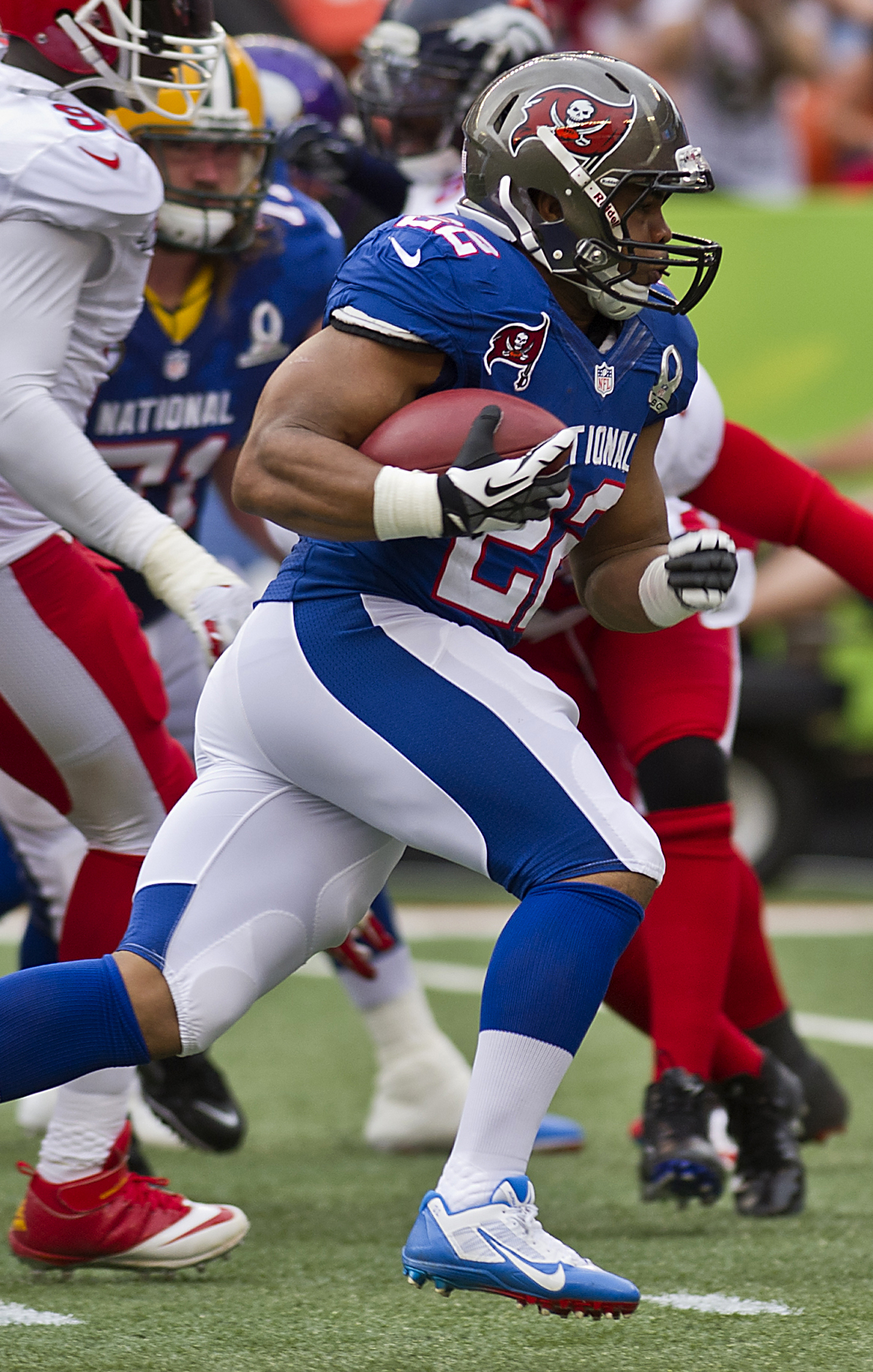
Martin at the 2013 Pro Bowl

On September 9, Martin had 95 rushing yards and 23 receiving yards in his NFL debut in the 16–10 victory over the Carolina Panthers. In the next game, a 41–34 loss to the New York Giants, he scored his first professional touchdown. On October 25, Martin rushed for 135 yards and one touchdown and caught three passes for 79 yards and a touchdown in a 36–17 win against the Minnesota Vikings. A week later, he rushed for 251 yards and tied the NFL record for rushing touchdowns in a half with four in a 42–32 road victory over the Oakland Raiders. In the game, Martin became the first player in NFL history to score touchdown runs of 70-plus, 45-plus, and 65-plus yards in a game, and is the second player in league history (along with Mike Anderson) to run for 250+ yards and four touchdowns in a game (coincidentally, they both ran for exactly 251 yards and were both in their rookie seasons). Martin broke the franchise records for rushing yardage and touchdowns in a game. He scored 24 total points in the game, which was the most by any player in a single game in the 2012 season. Martin earned NFC Offensive Player of the Week for his historic game against the Raiders. On November 18, against the Panthers, he had 138 rushing yards in the 27–21 victory. Three weeks later, Martin had 128 rushing yards and a rushing touchdown in the narrow 23–21 loss to the Philadelphia Eagles. In the regular season finale against the Atlanta Falcons, he had 142 rushing yards and a rushing touchdown during the 22–17 victory.

At the end of the regular season, Martin finished with over 1,450 yards rushing and nearly 500 yards receiving. His 1,926 yards from scrimmage in a single season ranks him second in Buccaneers' history behind James Wilder Sr. (2,229 yards from scrimmage). His 1,454 rushing yards broke the Buccaneers' single-season rookie rushing record that was previously held by Cadillac Williams (1,178 rushing yards). On January 4, 2013, Martin was announced as one of five finalists for the 2012 NFL Rookie of the Year. He earned a Pro Bowl selection for his performance in the 2012 season. Martin was named to the NFL All-Rookie Team. He was ranked 57th by his fellow players on the NFL Top 100 Players of 2013.

==== 2013 season ====
In a Week 2 game against the New Orleans Saints, Martin rushed for 144 yards on 29 carries. He suffered a shoulder injury against the Atlanta Falcons on October 20, 2013. He was placed on the season-ending injured reserve on November 8 due to a torn labrum. Martin finished the 2013 season with 456 rushing yards, a rushing touchdown, 12 receptions, and 66 receiving yards.

==== 2014 season ====
Martin returned from his injury in time for the season opener against the Carolina Panthers. On September 28, he scored his first touchdown of the season in a 27–24 victory over the Pittsburgh Steelers. In the season finale against the New Orleans Saints, Martin had a season-high 108 rushing yards. Overall, he finished the 2014 season with 494 rushing yards, two rushing touchdowns, 13 receptions, and 64 receiving yards.

==== 2015 season ====
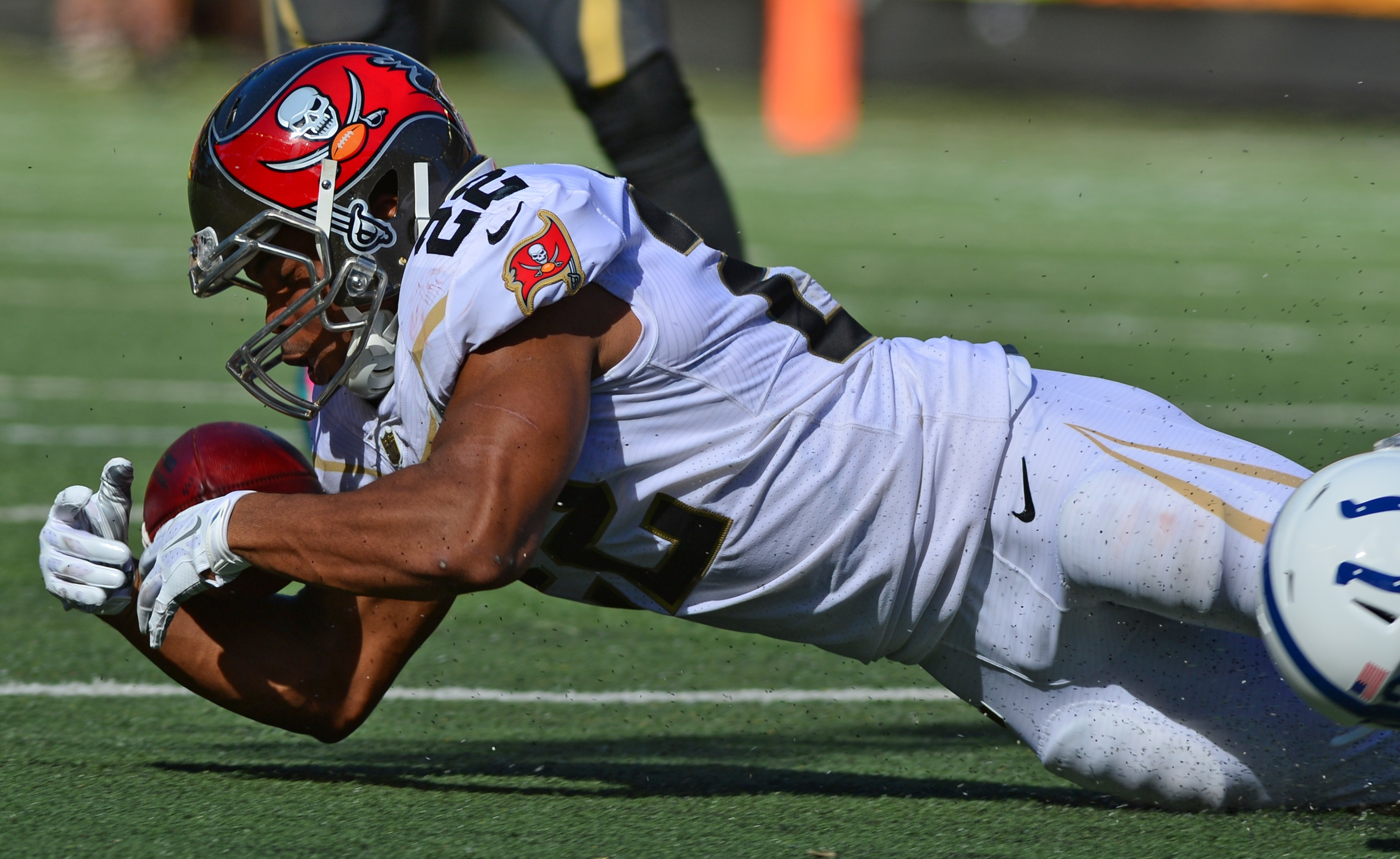
Martin at the 2016 Pro Bowl

Before the season, the Buccaneers declined picking up the fifth-year option of Martin's rookie contract, which would have allowed him to become a free agent after the season. On October 4, against the Carolina Panthers, Martin had 106 rushing yards and a touchdown. A week later, against the Jacksonville Jaguars, he had 123 rushing yards, two rushing touchdowns, three receptions, 35 receiving yards, and a receiving touchdown. Martin followed that up with 136 rushing yards against the Washington Redskins. In Week 11 against the Philadelphia Eagles, he ran for 235 yards on 27 carries, averaging 8.7 yards-per-attempt. Martin finished the 2015 season with 1,402 rushing yards, six rushing touchdowns, 33 receptions, 271 receiving yards, and a receiving touchdown. Following his resurgent season, Martin was selected for the 2016 Pro Bowl, the second of his career, and became the first Buccaneers running back to be named a first-team All-Pro. He was ranked 33rd on the NFL Top 100 Players of 2016.

==== 2016 season ====
On March 9, 2016, Martin signed a five-year, $35.75 million contract extension, keeping him with the Buccaneers through the 2020 season.

Following his resurgent season in 2015, Martin regressed in the 2016 season. He finished with 421 rushing yards, three rushing touchdowns, 14 receptions, and 134 receiving yards. On December 28, 2016, Martin was suspended four games for violation of the NFL substance abuse policy. His suspension carried into the 2017 season. Martin announced that he intended to enter a treatment facility after testing positive for Adderall. As a result, Martin did not receive $15 million in guaranteed money.

==== 2017 season ====
In 2017, Martin played in 11 games with six starts, rushing for a career-low 406 yards with three touchdowns on 138 carries.

On February 20, 2018, Martin was released by the Buccaneers after six seasons.

=== Oakland Raiders ===
==== 2018 season ====
On March 15, 2018, Martin signed a one-year contract with the Oakland Raiders. After starting running back Marshawn Lynch was placed on injured reserve with a groin injury, Martin would take his place as a starter for the remainder of the season. He had his best performance of the season in Week 16 against the Denver Broncos with 107 rushing yards and a touchdown. In the regular season finale against the Kansas City Chiefs, Martin had another 100-yard performance to close out the season. Overall, in the 2018 season, he finished with 723 rushing yards and four rushing touchdowns.

==== 2019 season ====
On May 1, 2019, Martin re-signed with the Raiders, after Isaiah Crowell suffered a season-ending injury. Martin was placed on injured reserve on August 25. He was released from injured reserve with an injury settlement on September 3.

== Death ==
On October 18, 2025, Martin died at the age of 36. According to the Oakland Police Department, they responded to a break-in at a private residence in Oakland during the early morning hours, after Martin allegedly entered a neighbor's home in a disoriented state. The police said that they told officers that the suspect was suffering from a "medical emergency". Martin was involved in a brief physical struggle with officers attempting to detain him, before being taken into custody. He became unresponsive in police custody and was taken to a hospital, where he died.

Martin's family released a statement saying that he privately "battled mental health challenges that profoundly impacted his personal and professional life." His parents had sought medical help for him the morning of his death. "Feeling overwhelmed and disoriented, Doug fled his home during the night and entered a neighbor's residence two doors down, where he was taken into custody by police", the family said.

== NFL career statistics ==
Year	Team	Games		Rushing					Receiving					Fumbles	
Year	Team	GP	GS	Att	Yds	Avg	Lng	TD	Rec	Yds	Avg	Lng	TD	Fum	Lost
2012	TB	16	16	319	1,454	4.6	70T	11	49	472	9.6	64T	1	1	1
2013	TB	6	6	127	456	3.6	28	1	12	66	5.5	13	0	2	1
2014	TB	11	11	134	494	3.7	63	2	13	64	4.9	20	0	–	–
2015	TB	16	16	288	1,402	4.9	84	6	33	271	8.2	25	1	5	5
2016	TB	8	8	144	421	2.9	17	3	14	134	9.6	27	0	1	1
2017	TB	11	8	138	406	2.9	27	3	9	84	9.3	17	0	1	1
2018	OAK	16	9	172	723	4.2	29	4	18	116	6.4	23	0	3	3
Total		84	74	1,322	5,356	4.1	84	30	148	1,207	8.2	64T	2	12	11

=== NFL records ===
- Most rushing touchdowns in a half: 4 (tied) (November 4, 2012, vs Oakland Raiders)

==== Buccaneers franchise records ====
- Most rushing yards in a single game: 251 (November 4, 2012, vs Oakland Raiders)
- Most rushing yards in a season by a rookie: 1,454
- Most yards from scrimmage in a season by a rookie: 1,926
- Most rushing touchdowns in a game: 4 (November 4, 2012, vs Oakland Raiders)
- Most rushing touchdowns in a season by a rookie: 11 (2012)
- Most rushing yards per game in a career: 74.2
