= Bobby Rainey =

American football player (born 1987)

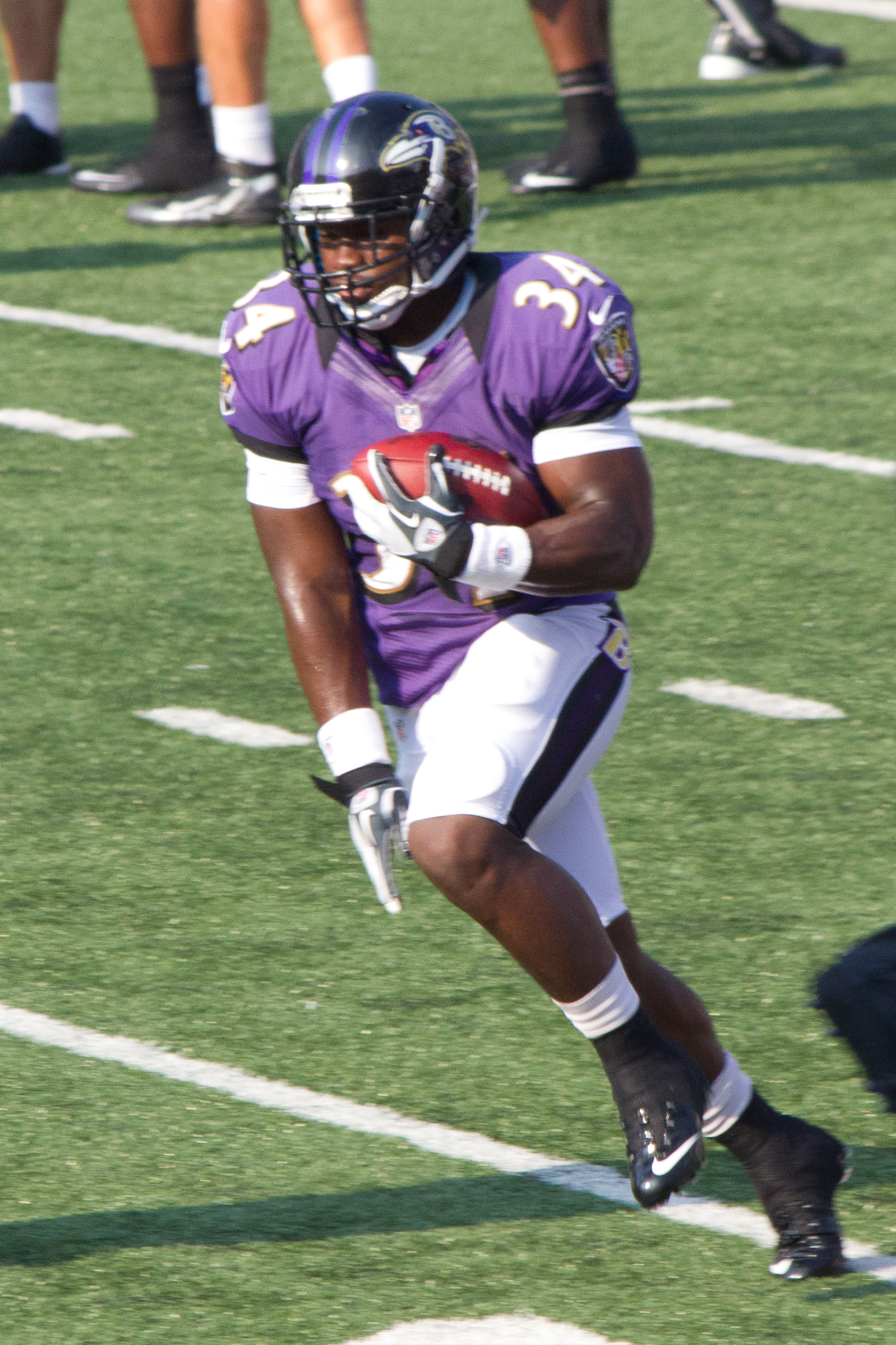
- Rainey with the Baltimore Ravens in 2012

No. 34, 43, 31
- Positions: Running back, return specialist

Personal information
- Born: October 16, 1987 (age 39); Griffin, Georgia, U.S.
- Listed height: 5 ft 8 in (1.73 m)
- Listed weight: 212 lb (96 kg)

Career information
- High school: Griffin
- College: Western Kentucky (2008–2011)
- NFL draft: 2012: undrafted

Career history
- Baltimore Ravens (2012); Cleveland Browns (2013); Tampa Bay Buccaneers (2013–2015); New York Giants (2016); Baltimore Ravens (2017)

Awards and highlights
- Super Bowl champion (XLVII); Second-team All-American (2011); 2× Sun Belt Offensive Player of the Year (2010, 2011); First-team All-Sun Belt (2010); Second-team All-Sun Belt (2009)

Career NFL statistics
- Rushing yards: 1,055
- Rushing average: 4.0
- Rushing touchdowns: 6
- Receptions: 76
- Receiving yards: 548
- Receiving touchdowns: 2
- Return yards: 1,735
- Return touchdowns: 1
- Stats at Pro Football Reference

Bobby Gene Rainey, Jr. (born October 16, 1987) is an American former professional football player who was a running back and return specialist in the National Football League (NFL). He played college football for the Western Kentucky Hilltoppers, earning second-team All-American honors in 2011. Rainey signed with the Baltimore Ravens as an undrafted free agent after the 2012 NFL draft. He also played for the Cleveland Browns, the Tampa Bay Buccaneers and the New York Giants.

== College career ==
In 2011, Rainey had 1,695 rushing yards and 17 total touchdowns while playing running back at Western Kentucky University. In 2010, Rainey was one of the top rushers in College Football. He led the nation in rushing attempts (340) and was third in the nation in rushing yards (1649). He was named the Sun Belt Conference Offensive Player of the Year in 2010 as well as earning All-American honors from SI.com. In July 2011, he was named to the Maxwell Award Watch List. In August, he was named to the Doak Walker Award Watch list. In 2009, he totaled over 2,100 yards and gained notoriety as one of the premier Kick Returners in College Football. His two official forty yard dash times were 4.42 and 4.45 respectively. He was also a member of the Western Kentucky Track & Field team.

=== Statistics ===
Year	Attempts	Rushing Yards	Touchdowns
2008 Fr.	35	240	1
2009 So.	144	939	6
2010 Jr.	340	1649	15
2011 Sr.	369	1695	13
Total	888	4523	35

=== School records ===
Rainey holds school records for WKU in rushing yards in a season (1,695) and rushing yards in a career (4,523). He is just the eighth FBS player since 2000 to rack up back-to-back 1,500-yard seasons. That list includes LaDainian Tomlinson (TCU), Ray Rice (Rutgers), Steven Jackson (Oregon State), DeAngelo Williams (Memphis), and Darren McFadden (Arkansas).

== Professional career ==
=== Baltimore Ravens ===
Rainey signed with the Baltimore Ravens as an undrafted free agent. On September 10, 2012, he was released by the Ravens. On September 12, he was re-signed to the practice squad and became practice squad captain. On October 16, Rainey was promoted to the active roster after the team placed Lardarius Webb on injured reserve. Rainey never made it on the active game-day roster during the 2012 season. On November 13, he was placed on injured reserve due to a knee injury. Rainey earned a Super Bowl ring when the Ravens defeated the San Francisco 49ers in Super Bowl XLVII.

On August 31, 2013, Rainey was released by the Ravens as a part of the team's final roster cuts.

=== Cleveland Browns ===
On September 1, 2013, Rainey was picked up by the Cleveland Browns after clearing waivers. He was released by Cleveland after Week 7 of the 2013 season.

=== Tampa Bay Buccaneers ===
==== 2013 season ====
On October 21, 2013, he was acquired off waivers by the Tampa Bay Buccaneers. He scored his first career regular season touchdown on November 11. It was the eventual game-winning touchdown in the Buccaneers' 22-19 win over the Miami Dolphins, serving as Tampa Bay's first win of the 2013 season. On November 17, Rainey had three touchdowns (two rushing and one receiving) and 163 rushing yards in the Buccaneers' win over the Atlanta Falcons. Due to injuries to Doug Martin and Mike James, he would finish his debut Buccaneer season as the team's leading rusher with 137 attempts for 523 yards and five touchdowns. He also had 11 catches for 27 yards and one receiving touchdown.

==== 2014 season ====
On March 5, 2014, Rainey signed a one-year deal to stay with the Buccaneers. Rainey compiled 94 attempts for 406 yards and one touchdown only second to Doug Martin. He also had 33 catches for 315 yards and one receiving touchdown.

==== 2015 season ====
On March 10, 2015, the Buccaneers extended a restricted free agent tender offer of $1.542 million for one year to Rainey restricting him from free negotiating with any other and granting Tampa the right to match any offer he receives from other teams. He signed his one-year tender on April 24.

=== New York Giants ===
Rainey signed with the New York Giants on April 11, 2016.

=== Baltimore Ravens (second stint) ===
On July 26, 2017, Rainey signed with the Baltimore Ravens. On September 1, he was released by the Ravens during final roster cuts. Rainey was re-signed on October 10, after an injury to Terrance West. In Week 6, against the Chicago Bears, he recorded a 96-yard kickoff return touchdown in the third quarter. On November 13, Rainey was released by the Ravens.
