= Josh Keyes (American football) =

American football player (born 1993)

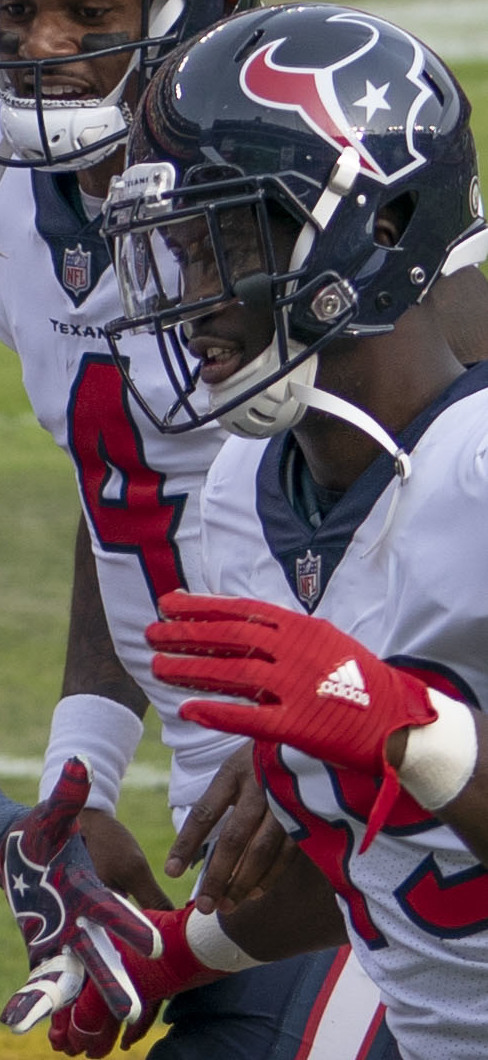
- Keyes with the Houston Texans in 2018

No. 49, 50, 52, 53, 57
- Position: Linebacker

Personal information
- Born: January 23, 1993 (age 33); Philmont, New York
- Listed height: 6 ft 2 in (1.88 m)
- Listed weight: 225 lb (102 kg)

Career information
- High school: Chatham (NY)
- College: Boston College
- NFL draft: 2015: undrafted

Career history
- Tampa Bay Buccaneers (2015)*; Kansas City Chiefs (2015)*; Tampa Bay Buccaneers (2015–2016); Atlanta Falcons (2016–2017); Los Angeles Chargers (2017); Cleveland Browns (2017); Houston Texans (2018)*; Washington Redskins (2018); Houston Texans (2018)
- * Offseason or practice squad member only

Career NFL statistics
- Total tackles: 19
- Sacks: 0
- Forced fumbles: 0
- Fumble recoveries: 0
- Interceptions: 0
- Stats at Pro Football Reference

Josh Keyes (born January 23, 1993) is a former American football linebacker. He played college football at Boston College.

== Professional career ==
=== Tampa Bay Buccaneers ===
Keyes was signed by the Tampa Bay Buccaneers as an undrafted rookie on May 5, 2015. On September 5, he was waived by Tampa Bay. Two days later, Keyes was re-signed to the team's practice squad. On September 24, he was released from the practice squad.

=== Kansas City Chiefs ===
On October 20, 2015, Keyes was signed to the Kansas City Chiefs' practice squad. On November 3, 2015, he was released by the team.

=== Tampa Bay Buccaneers (second stint) ===
On November 18, 2015, Keyes returned to the Tampa Bay Buccaneers and was re-signed to their practice squad. Three days later, on November 21, Keyes was promoted to the Buccaneers' active roster. On September 3, 2016, Keyes was released by the Buccaneers as part of final roster cuts. The next day, he was re-signed to the Buccaneers' practice squad. On September 10, Keyes was promoted to the Buccaneers' active roster. He was released on September 21. Keyes was re-signed on September 23, after Devante Bond was placed on injured reserve. He was released again on October 3, and re-signed to the practice squad two days later. Keyes was released by Tampa Bay on October 11.

=== Atlanta Falcons ===
On October 19, 2016, Keyes was signed to the Atlanta Falcons' practice squad. He was promoted to the active roster on December 22. Keyes was inactive for the Falcons' 34–28 overtime loss to the New England Patriots in the Super Bowl.

On September 2, 2017, Keyes was waived/injured by the Falcons and placed on injured reserve. He was released by Atlanta on September 11.

=== Los Angeles Chargers ===
On October 16, 2017, Keyes signed with the Los Angeles Chargers. He was waived by Los Angeles on November 7.

=== Cleveland Browns ===
On November 8, 2017, Keyes was claimed off waivers by the Cleveland Browns.

=== Houston Texans ===
On March 20, 2018, Keyes signed with the Houston Texans. He was waived by the Texans on September 1.

=== Washington Redskins ===
Keyes signed with the Washington Redskins on September 5, 2018, but was waived on September 11.

=== Houston Texans (second stint) ===
On October 22, 2018, Keyes was signed by the Houston Texans. He was waived by Houston on November 27. Keyes was re-signed by the team on December 27.
