= C. J. Roberts (cornerback) =

American gridiron football player (born 1991)

No. 17
- Position: Cornerback

Personal information
- Born: September 8, 1991 (age 35); Boynton Beach, Florida
- Listed height: 5 ft 11 in (1.80 m)
- Listed weight: 180 lb (82 kg)

Career information
- College: CSU Pueblo
- NFL draft: 2015: undrafted

Career history
- Arizona Cardinals (2015)*; Tampa Bay Buccaneers (2015–2016)*; Winnipeg Blue Bombers (2016)
- * Offseason or practice squad member only

C. J. Roberts (born September 8, 1991) is a Canadian football cornerback. He played college football at Colorado State University Pueblo.

== Professional career ==
=== Arizona Cardinals ===
Roberts signed with the Arizona Cardinals on May 5, 2015. Roberts was released on September 5, 2015.

=== Tampa Bay Buccaneers ===
Roberts signed with the Tampa Bay Buccaneers on December 30, 2015. He was waived on April 29, 2016.

=== Winnipeg Blue Bombers ===
Roberts has accepted a spot on the 10-member practice squad for the Winnipeg Blue Bombers start of the 2016 CFL season. He played in seven games for the Blue Bombers in 2016, recording 26 defensive tackles, two interceptions, and one touchdown.
