= Tim Wright (American football) =

American football player (born 1990)

No. 81, 83
- Position: Tight end

Personal information
- Born: April 7, 1990 (age 36); Neptune Township, New Jersey, U.S.
- Listed height: 6 ft 4 in (1.93 m)
- Listed weight: 245 lb (111 kg)

Career information
- High school: Wall (Wall Township, New Jersey)
- College: Rutgers (2008–2012)
- NFL draft: 2013: undrafted

Career history
- Tampa Bay Buccaneers (2013); New England Patriots (2014); Tampa Bay Buccaneers (2015)*; Detroit Lions (2015–2016); Kansas City Chiefs (2018)*
- * Offseason or practice squad member only

Awards and highlights
- Super Bowl champion (XLIX)

Career NFL statistics
- Receptions: 89
- Receiving yards: 907
- Receiving touchdowns: 13
- Stats at Pro Football Reference

Timothy Wright (born April 7, 1990) is an American former professional football player who was a tight end in the National Football League (NFL). He was signed by the Tampa Bay Buccaneers as an undrafted free agent in 2013. He played college football for the Rutgers Scarlet Knights, where he subsequently opened a barbershop in 2016.

== Early life ==
Wright grew up in Neptune, New Jersey and attended Green Grove Elementary School. As a teen, he played high school football at Wall High School.

== College career ==
Wright played wide receiver at Rutgers under head coach Greg Schiano for his first couple of years. Schiano was also his head coach in the NFL for his rookie season with the Tampa Bay Buccaneers.

== Professional career ==
Pre-draft measurables
Height	Weight	40-yard dash	10-yard split	20-yard split	20-yard shuttle	Three-cone drill	Vertical jump	Broad jump	Bench press
6 ft 3 in (1.91 m)	219 lb (99 kg)	4.65 s	1.63 s	2.74 s	4.47 s	7.27 s	36 in (0.91 m)	9 ft 10 in (3.00 m)	19 reps
All values from Rutgers Pro Day

=== Tampa Bay Buccaneers (first stint) ===
On April 29, 2013, Wright was signed as an undrafted free agent by the Tampa Bay Buccaneers. On June 12, 2013, Wright was moved from wide receiver to tight end. Wright played all 16 games for the Buccaneers, starting 8. He finished the season with 54 catches for 571 yards and 5 touchdowns, the yards and touchdowns tied for the most by an undrafted rookie tight end in NFL history. Wright was the only rookie tight end in 2013 to have more than 500 receiving yards.

=== New England Patriots ===
On August 26, 2014, Wright was traded by the Buccaneers to the New England Patriots along with a 2015 4th round draft pick for guard Logan Mankins. Wright played in 11 games for the Patriots, catching 26 passes for 259 yards, with a career-high 6 touchdowns. Wright played in the Patriots Super Bowl XLIX victory over the Seattle Seahawks, but did not record any catches. He was released on June 11, 2015.

=== Tampa Bay Buccaneers (second stint) ===
On June 12, 2015, the Buccaneers claimed Wright off waivers.

=== Detroit Lions ===
On August 31, 2015, the Buccaneers traded Wright to the Detroit Lions in exchange for placekicker Kyle Brindza. During the 2015 season, Wright appeared in nine games for the Lions, where he finished with nine receptions for 77 yards and two touchdowns. On March 16, 2016, the Lions re-signed Wright to a one-year contract. On May 31, 2016, he was placed on season-ending injured reserve with a torn ACL.

On August 9, 2017, Wright re-signed with the Lions. He was released on August 28, 2017.

=== Kansas City Chiefs ===
On April 9, 2018, Wright was signed by the Kansas City Chiefs. He was released on September 1, 2018.

=== NFL statistics ===
Year	Team	GP	REC	YDs	AVG	LNG	TDs	FDs	Fum	FumL
2013	TB	16	54	571	10.6	36	5	30	0	0
2014	NE	11	26	259	9.9	30	6	18	0	0
2015	DET	9	9	77	8.6	26	2	6	0	0
Career		41	89	907	10.2	36	13	54	0	0
