= Gaskins =

Gaskins may refer to:

- Gaskins (surname)
- Gaskins Run
- Gaskins, Arkansas
- Gaskins, Florida
- Gaskins, Isle of Wight

== See also ==
- Gaskin (disambiguation)
