= Ryan Fitzpatrick =

American football player and television analyst

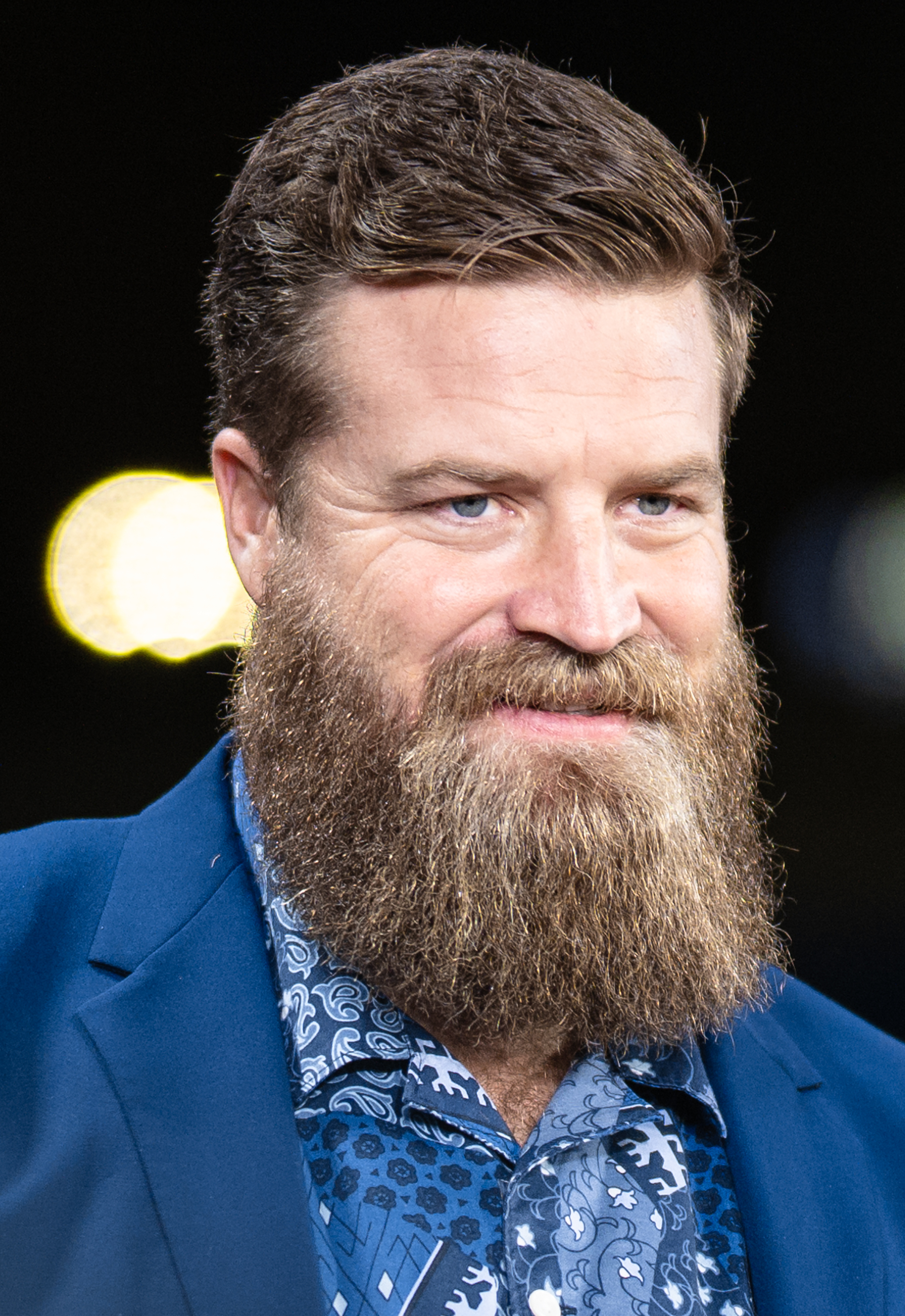
- Fitzpatrick in 2023

No. 12, 11, 14, 4
- Position: Quarterback

Personal information
- Born: November 24, 1982 (age 43); Gilbert, Arizona, U.S.
- Listed height: 6 ft 2 in (1.88 m)
- Listed weight: 221 lb (100 kg)

Career information
- High school: Highland (Gilbert)
- College: Harvard (2001–2004)
- NFL draft: 2005: 7th round, 250th overall pick

Career history
- St. Louis Rams (2005–2006); Cincinnati Bengals (2007–2008); Buffalo Bills (2009–2012); Tennessee Titans (2013); Houston Texans (2014); New York Jets (2015–2016); Tampa Bay Buccaneers (2017–2018); Miami Dolphins (2019–2020); Washington Football Team (2021)

Awards and highlights
- Ivy League Player of the Year (2004); First-team All–Ivy League (2004); NFL records: Most teams to have started a game for: 9; Most consecutive games with 400+ passing yards: 3; Most teams to have rushed a touchdown for: 8; Most teams to have thrown a touchdown for: 8

Career NFL statistics
- Passing attempts: 5,060
- Passing completions: 3,072
- Completion percentage: 60.7%
- TD–INT: 223–169
- Passing yards: 34,990
- Passer rating: 82.3
- Stats at Pro Football Reference

Ryan Joseph Fitzpatrick (born November 24, 1982) is an American former professional football quarterback who played in the National Football League (NFL) for 17 seasons. He started at quarterback for nine teams, the most in league history. Fitzpatrick is also the only NFL player to have a passing touchdown with eight different teams. Since retiring, he has served as an analyst for Thursday Night Football on NFL on Prime Video.

Fitzpatrick played college football for the Harvard Crimson, winning Ivy League Player of the Year and setting the school record for quarterback rushing yards. He was selected by the St. Louis Rams in the seventh round of the 2005 NFL draft. Fitzpatrick's longest stint was with the Buffalo Bills for four seasons, while his only two winning seasons were with the 2015 New York Jets and the 2020 Miami Dolphins. As a member of the Tampa Bay Buccaneers in 2018, Fitzpatrick became the first NFL quarterback to throw for over 400 yards in three consecutive games. He holds the most career passing yards and passing touchdowns among NFL quarterbacks without a postseason appearance.

== Early life ==
Ryan Joseph Fitzpatrick was born on November 24, 1982, in Gilbert, Arizona. He attended Highland High School in Gilbert.

== College career ==
While an economics student at Harvard University, Fitzpatrick had five starts for the Crimson during the 2001 and 2002 seasons, working as the backup for Neil Rose. In 2002, Fitzpatrick recorded 1,155 passing yards with eight touchdowns and no interceptions to go along with 523 rushing yards and five touchdowns.

After Rose graduated in 2003, Fitzpatrick took over the starting job and finished his junior campaign with 1,770 yards, 16 touchdowns, and eight interceptions in seven games. Additionally, he ran for 430 yards and six touchdowns, leading his team to a 7–3 record.

In 2004, Fitzpatrick was named the Ivy League Player of the Year and winner of the George H. "Bulger" Lowe Award, as he accumulated 1,986 yards with 13 touchdowns and six interceptions. Fitzpatrick also led Harvard to a 10–0 record, thus winning the Ivy League Championship. He ranked second on the team with 448 rushing yards and five scores.

For his career, Fitzpatrick ranked third on Harvard's career list for pass completions, touchdowns, and passing yards. Fitzpatrick's 1,006 total plays for 6,721 yards in total offense broke the old school career records of 1,005 plays by Mike Giardi (1991–93) and 6,519 yards by Neil Rose. (His total plays record has since been surpassed.) Fitzpatrick was also the school's first quarterback to rush for over 1,000 career yards.

== Professional career ==
Like most incoming NFL rookies, Fitzpatrick took the Wonderlic test. Fitzpatrick completed the test in nine minutes, with rumors indicating that he obtained a perfect score of 50. However, a 2005 The Wall Street Journal report said that Fitzpatrick scored a 48, which is still considered exceptionally high. While his actual score is unknown, Fitzpatrick has acknowledged leaving at least one question blank, making 49 his highest possible score. To date, Fitzpatrick has the highest reported Wonderlic test score achieved among NFL quarterbacks. The only player to earn a verified perfect score on the Wonderlic was also a Harvard graduate: wide receiver/punter Pat McInally, who played his entire career for the Cincinnati Bengals.

Pre-draft measurables
Height	Weight	Arm length	Hand span	40-yard dash	10-yard split	20-yard split	20-yard shuttle	Three-cone drill	Vertical jump	Broad jump	Wonderlic
6 ft 2 3/8 in (1.89 m)	232 lb (105 kg)	31 1/8 in (0.79 m)	10 3/4 in (0.27 m)	4.87 s	1.71 s	2.83 s	4.07 s	7.09 s	30.5 in (0.77 m)	8 ft 9 in (2.67 m)	48
All from NFL Combine.

=== St. Louis Rams ===
==== 2005 season ====
The St. Louis Rams selected Fitzpatrick in the seventh round (250th overall) of the 2005 NFL draft. He was the last of 14 quarterbacks drafted in 2005.

On July 18, 2005, the Rams signed Fitzpatrick to a three-year, $953,000 contract. Throughout training camp, he competed for a roster spot against Jeff Smoker to be the Rams' third-string quarterback. Head coach Mike Martz named Fitzpatrick the third-string quarterback on the depth chart to begin his rookie season, behind Marc Bulger and Jamie Martin. Fitzpatrick was upgraded to the primary backup role in Week 6 after Bulger sustained a shoulder injury and was placed on injured reserve.

On November 27, 2005, Fitzpatrick made his professional regular season debut after entering the game in the second quarter against the Houston Texans to replace injured veteran journeyman Jamie Martin. Fitzpatrick completed 19 of 30 passes for 310 yards and three touchdowns for a 117.4 quarterback rating and led the Rams from a 24–3 halftime deficit to a 33–27 overtime road victory. He earned NFC Offensive Player of the Week for his performance. This made Fitzpatrick one of only eight players who passed for more than 300 yards in their NFL debut. The win earned him the next three starts, making Fitzpatrick the first Harvard quarterback to start an NFL game.

Fitzpatrick was unable to duplicate his debut performance in the games he started with the Rams coming two weeks later in a 27–13 road loss to the Minnesota Vikings, throwing for 235 yards and five interceptions for a quarterback rating of 32.4 for the game. Fitzpatrick was replaced by Martin after halftime the following week, after struggling in a home game against the Philadelphia Eagles in which he completed just 41.7% of his passes for a total of 69 yards.

Fitzpatrick finished his rookie season completing 76 of 153 passes for 777 yards, four touchdowns, and eight interceptions to go along with 14 carries for 64 yards and two touchdowns in four games and three starts.

==== 2006 season ====
In 2006, Fitzpatrick appeared in only one game, appearing late in the regular season finale against the Minnesota Vikings in relief of Marc Bulger and ran out the clock in the 41–21 road victory.

=== Cincinnati Bengals ===
==== 2007 season ====
On September 1, 2007, Fitzpatrick was traded to the Cincinnati Bengals for a seventh-round pick in the 2008 NFL draft.

==== 2008 season ====
A restricted free agent in the 2008 offseason, Fitzpatrick signed his one-year tender offer from the Bengals on April 17.

Due to an elbow injury to starting quarterback Carson Palmer, Fitzpatrick made his first Bengals start on September 28, 2008, against the Cleveland Browns. Fitzpatrick was not only the leading passer but also the leading rusher in the 20–12 loss, finishing with 156 passing yards, a touchdown, and three interceptions to go along with 41 rushing yards. Palmer returned the next week to start against the Dallas Cowboys, but once again had to sit the following week to rest his elbow. On October 12, 2008, Fitzpatrick got the start against the New York Jets and every other game for the rest of the season.

Fitzpatrick finished the season with 1,905 passing yards, eight touchdowns, and nine interceptions to go along with 60 carries for 304 yards and two touchdowns in 13 games and 12 starts. His 304 rushing yards ranked third among quarterbacks behind Tyler Thigpen and David Garrard.

=== Buffalo Bills ===
==== 2009 season ====
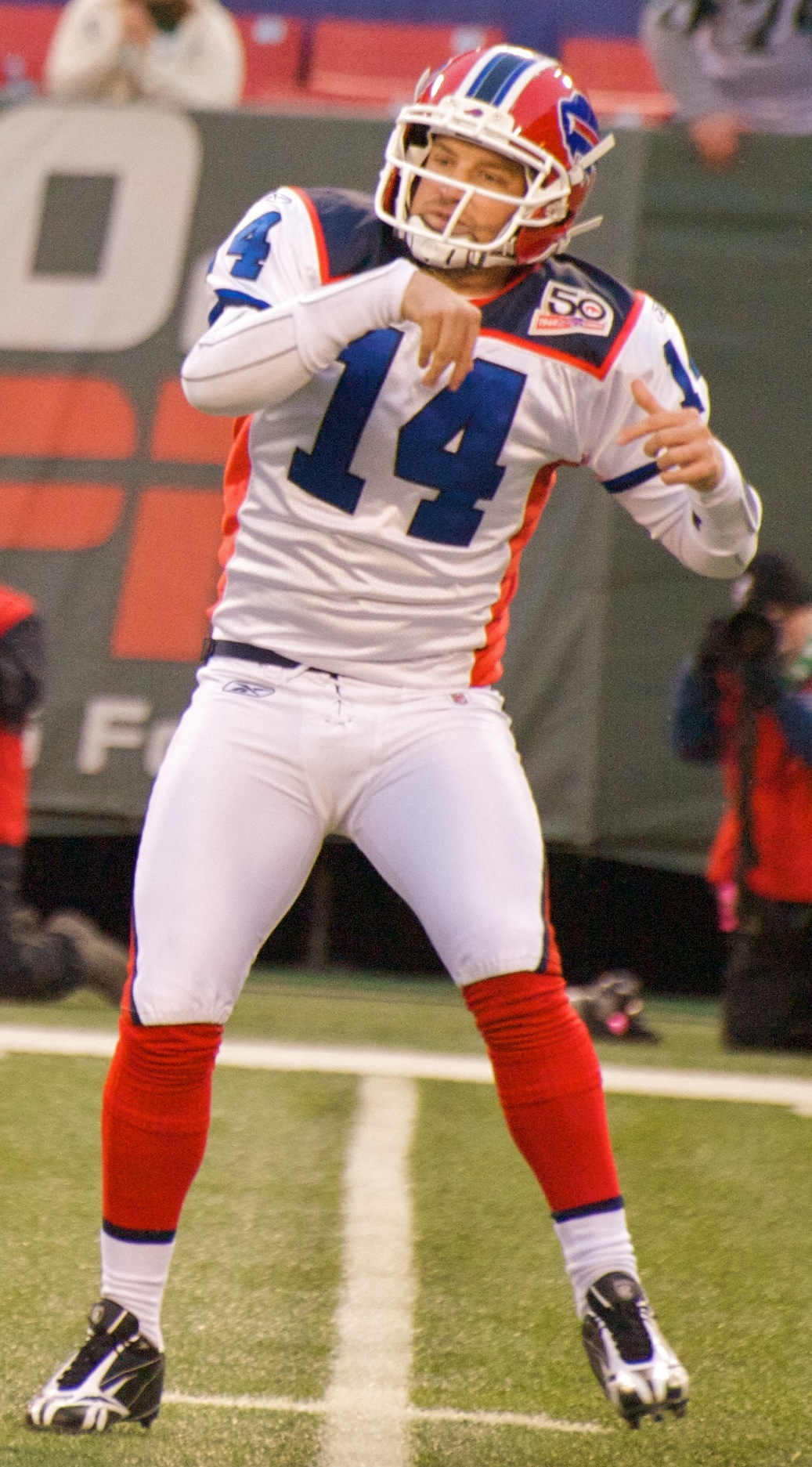
Fitzpatrick with the Buffalo Bills in 2009

On February 27, 2009, Fitzpatrick signed a three-year, $7.4 million contract with the Buffalo Bills.

Fitzpatrick made his first appearance on October 18, 2009, against the New York Jets when starter Trent Edwards went down with an injury. Fitzpatrick threw for 116 yards, a touchdown, and an interception and led the Bills to a 16–13 overtime victory. He started the following two games, resulting in a 20–9 road victory over the Carolina Panthers and a 31–10 loss to the Houston Texans.

On November 18, 2009, Fitzpatrick was named the starter by interim head coach Perry Fewell who took over the coaching duties after former head coach Dick Jauron was fired. As Fitzpatrick recalled, Fewell told him and offensive coordinator Alex Van Pelt to "play loose and have fun", departing from Jauron's ultra-conservative scheme, and that he and Van Pelt were "winging it" in the second half of the season. Fitzpatrick went 3–3 as a starter under Fewell, throwing for 1,060 yards, seven touchdowns, and six interceptions. He went 5–4 in games where he had a majority of the playing time for a team that finished with a 6–10 record. During a Week 11 18–15 road loss to the Jacksonville Jaguars, Fitzpatrick threw a 98-yard touchdown pass to Terrell Owens, the longest touchdown reception and pass for both Owens and Fitzpatrick, also setting the team record for the longest touchdown pass.

Fitzpatrick finished the 2009 season with 1,422 passing yards, nine touchdowns, and 10 interceptions to go along with 31 carries for 141 yards and a touchdown in 10 games and eight starts.

==== 2010 season ====
New head coach Chan Gailey decided to go with Trent Edwards as the starter for the 2010 season, relegating Fitzpatrick to the backup role. On September 20, 2010, he was named the new starting quarterback following the Bills' 0–2 start.

During a Week 11 49–31 comeback road victory over the Cincinnati Bengals, Fitzpatrick threw for 316 yards and four touchdowns, including three to Stevie Johnson, and two interceptions. Despite the Bills finishing at 4–12 (4–9 with him at quarterback), Fitzpatrick recorded at least one touchdown pass in 13 consecutive games and becoming the first Bills quarterback to pass for at least 3,000 yards in a season since J. P. Losman in 2006.

Overall, Fitzpatrick finished the season with 3,000 passing yards, 23 touchdowns, and 15 interceptions to go along with 40 carries for 269 yards in 13 games and starts.

==== 2011 season ====
During a Week 2 comeback 38–35 victory over the Oakland Raiders, Fitzpatrick led the Bills to touchdown drives on five straight possessions in the second half. It was the first time in league history a team had scored offensive touchdowns on five straight possessions in the second half. He was named the AFC Offensive Player of the Month for September.

On October 28, 2011, Fitzpatrick signed a six-year, $59 million contract extension including a $10 million signing bonus with the Bills. He had three 300-yard performances in the 2011 season, with a season-high 369 yards during a Week 3 34–31 comeback victory over the New England Patriots.

After the 2011 season, it was revealed that Fitzpatrick had broken his ribs in a game against the Washington Redskins, which was presumably a factor in his decline in play over the rest of the season. Fitzpatrick finished the 2011 season with 3,832 passing yards, 24 touchdowns, and a league-leading 23 interceptions to go along with 56 carries for 215 yards in 16 games and starts.

==== 2012 season ====
Fitzpatrick returned as the Bills' starter in 2012, finishing with 3,400 passing yards, 24 touchdowns, and 16 interceptions to go along with 48 carries for 197 yards and a touchdown in 16 games and starts.

Following Chan Gailey's firing after the season, Bills general manager Buddy Nix was the victim of a prank call in which he inadvertently revealed that he was unhappy with Fitzpatrick's contract, stating "we just can't afford to pay that kind of money for a guy who's fighting for probably a backup job". Shortly after the leaked phone call was reported on by Deadspin, the team parted ways with Fitzpatrick, releasing him on March 12, 2013, before he was due a $3 million bonus.

==== Overview ====
Despite the nature of his departure from the Bills and having a losing record with Buffalo, Fitzpatrick and Bills Mafia continue to hold each other in high esteem. Upon his retirement, Fitzpatrick listed Buffalo as his "favorite place to play."

"I don't know that I've ever felt more at home in a stadium or with a fanbase. I was in Buffalo for four years, but those are my people. I feel like I understand them and they understand me, and it was one of the great pleasures of my career playing there."

— Ryan Fitzpatrick reflecting on his time in Buffalo on Adam Schefter's podcast

Sports Illustrated comments that Fitzpatrick remains a fan favorite in Buffalo due to the manner in which he connected with the fandom and integrated himself and his family with the Buffalo community during his time on the Bills. Journalist Jerry Sullivan also notes that Fitzpatrick's resilience and passion endeared him to fans and that his tenure on the Bills cemented his playing style as a gunslinger.

=== Tennessee Titans ===
On March 18, 2013, Fitzpatrick signed a two-year contract with the Tennessee Titans.

During a Week 4 38–13 victory over the New York Jets, Fitzpatrick made his Titans debut, replacing an injured Jake Locker in the third quarter. Fitzpatrick completed three of eight passes for 108 yards and a 77-yard touchdown pass to Nate Washington.

Fitzpatrick played in 11 games and started in nine of them. He finished the season with a 3–6 record as the starting quarterback, beating division rivals Jacksonville Jaguars and Houston Texans in the final two games of the season. Fitzpatrick completed the season throwing for 2,454 yards, 14 touchdowns, and 12 interceptions to go along with 43 carries for 225 yards and three touchdowns.

Fitzpatrick was released on March 14, 2014, and replaced by Charlie Whitehurst.

=== Houston Texans ===
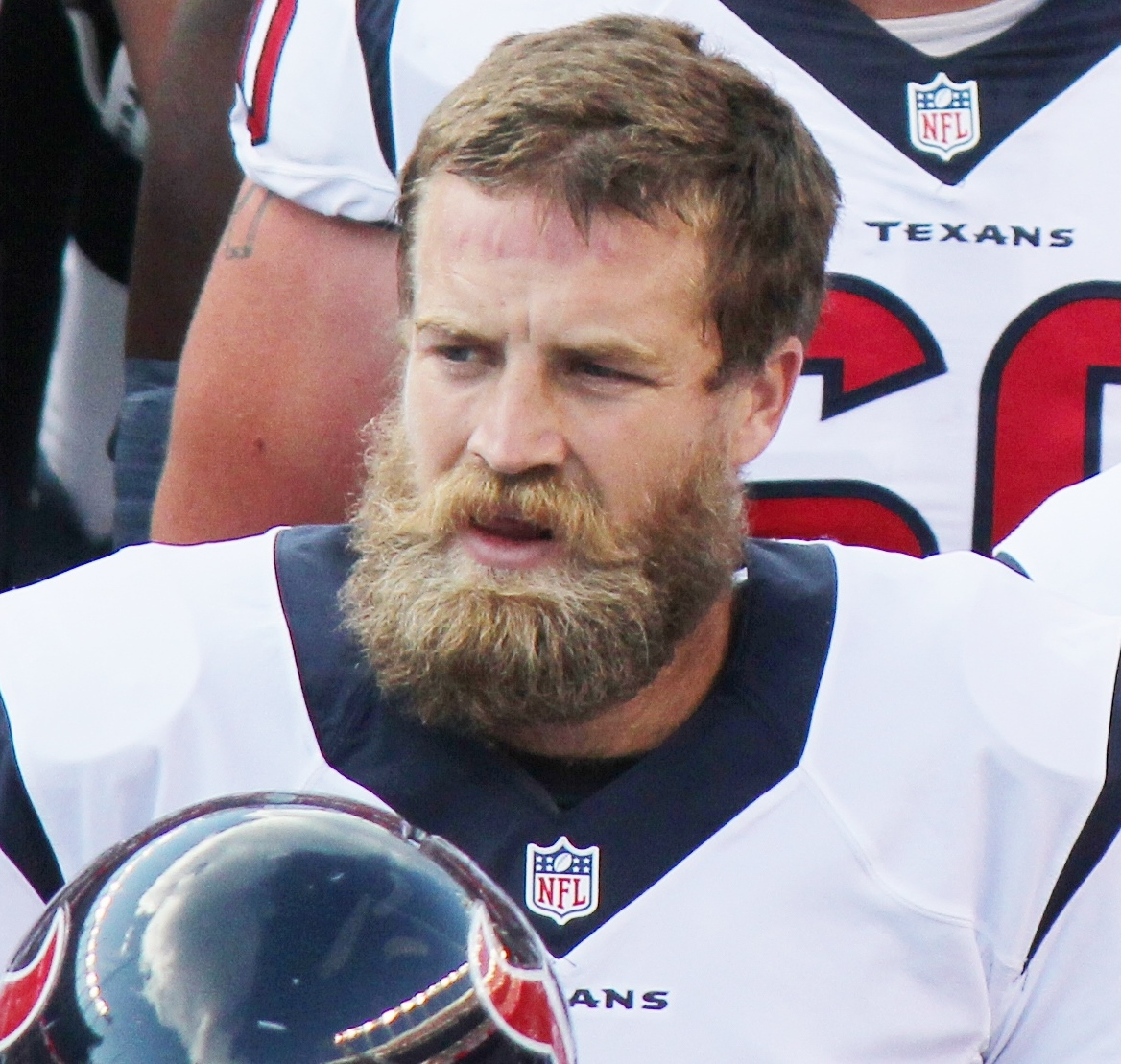
Fitzpatrick with the Houston Texans in 2014

On March 18, 2014, Fitzpatrick signed a two-year contract with the Houston Texans. He was named the Texans' starting quarterback by new head coach Bill O'Brien on June 17, but was demoted to second on the Texans' depth chart on November 5, being replaced by Ryan Mallett.

On November 23, 2014, Mallett tore his pectoral muscle and Fitzpatrick was renamed the starter. During a Week 13 45–21 victory over the Tennessee Titans, Fitzpatrick threw for 358 yards and a franchise-record six touchdowns and 358 yards for a 147.5 passer rating. He earned AFC Offensive Player of the Week honors for his performance against the Titans. Two weeks later against the Indianapolis Colts, Fitzpatrick scrambled for a two-yard gain in the second quarter, was tripped up, and left the eventual 17–10 loss with a fractured left tibia, ending his season. Fitzpatrick was replaced by rookie Tom Savage, who also received a minor injury.

Fitzpatrick finished 2014 the season with 2,483 passing yards, 17 touchdowns, and eight interceptions for a then career-high 95.3 passer rating to go along with 50 carries for 184 yards and two touchdowns and a 6–6 record as the starting quarterback for the Texans.

=== New York Jets ===
==== 2015 season ====
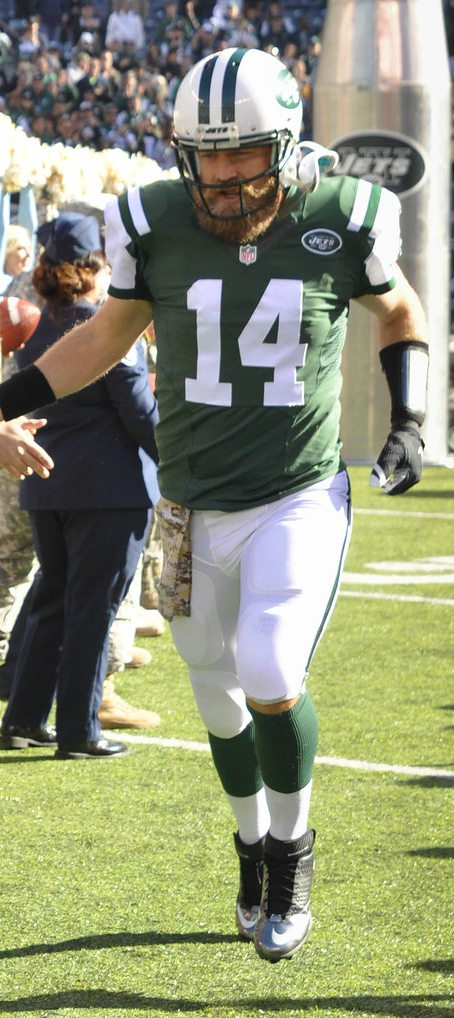
Fitzpatrick with the New York Jets in 2015

On March 11, 2015, Fitzpatrick was traded to the New York Jets for a late-round conditional draft pick in the 2016 NFL draft. The move reunited Fitzpatrick with his former head coach Chan Gailey, who was hired during the off-season as the Jets offensive coordinator and play-caller. Following an incident in the locker room, in which starting quarterback Geno Smith suffered a broken jaw after being punched by linebacker IK Enemkpali, Fitzpatrick was tentatively named the Week 1 starter for the Jets.

Making his first start for the Jets in the season-opening 31–10 victory over the Cleveland Browns, Fitzpatrick threw for 179 yards, two touchdowns, and an interception in the 31–10 victory. In the next game against the Indianapolis Colts on Monday Night Football, he threw for 244 yards, two touchdowns, and an interception as the Jets won on the road by a score of 20–7. The following week against the Philadelphia Eagles, Fitzpatrick threw for 283 yards, two touchdowns, and three interceptions in the 17–24 loss. During a Week 4 27–14 victory over the Miami Dolphins at Wembley Stadium in London, Fitzpatrick threw for 218 yards, a touchdown, and an interception. Two weeks later against the Washington Redskins, Fitzpatrick threw for 253 yards, two touchdowns, and an interception while also rushing for 31 yards and a touchdown in the 34–20 victory. During a Week 7 30–23 road loss to the New England Patriots, Fitzpatrick threw for 295 yards and two touchdowns.

During the first quarter of a Week 8 34–20 loss to the Oakland Raiders, Fitzpatrick suffered torn ligaments in his left thumb while scrambling and did not play for the remainder of the game, being relieved by Geno Smith. Fitzpatrick underwent thumb surgery two days later and stated that he would still start. In the next game against the Jacksonville Jaguars, Fitzpatrick threw for 272 yards with two touchdowns as the Jets won by a score of 28–23. The following week on Thursday Night Football against the Buffalo Bills, he threw for 193 yards, two touchdowns, and two interceptions as the Jets lost by a score 22–17. During a Week 11 24–17 road loss to the Houston Texans, Fitzpatrick had 216 passing yards, a touchdown, and two interceptions to go along with five carries for 12 yards and a touchdown.

During a Dolphins rematch in Week 12, Fitzpatrick made his 100th career start by throwing for 277 yards and four touchdowns in the 38–20 victory. In the next game against interconference-rival New York Giants, Fitzpatrick threw for 390 yards and two touchdowns as the Jets won on the road by a score of 23–20 in overtime. The following week against the Tennessee Titans, he had 263 passing yards and three touchdowns in a 30–8 victory to earn AFC Offensive Player of the Week honors. During a Week 15 19–16 road victory over the Dallas Cowboys, Fitzpatrick threw for 299 yards, a touchdown, and an interception. This was Fitzpatrick's ninth win of the season as a starter, securing his first winning season as a starting quarterback. In the next game against the Patriots, Fitzpatrick finished with 296 passing yards and three touchdowns, including an overtime drive that gave the Jets a game-winning touchdown for a 26–20 victory. For his effort against the Patriots, Fitzpatrick earned another AFC Offensive Player of the Week award. In the regular-season finale against the Bills, Fitzpatrick threw for 181 yards, two touchdowns, and three costly interceptions (all in the fourth quarter) as the Jets lost on the road by a score of 22–17 and were eliminated from playoff contention after the Pittsburgh Steelers defeated the Cleveland Browns, despite finishing the year with a 10–6 record.

Having started in all 16 games of the 2015 season, Fitzpatrick finished with 3,905 passing yards, 31 touchdowns, and 15 interceptions, breaking Vinny Testaverde's 1998 franchise record for most touchdown passes in a season. Fitzpatrick also had 60 carries for 270 yards and two touchdowns.

==== 2016 season ====
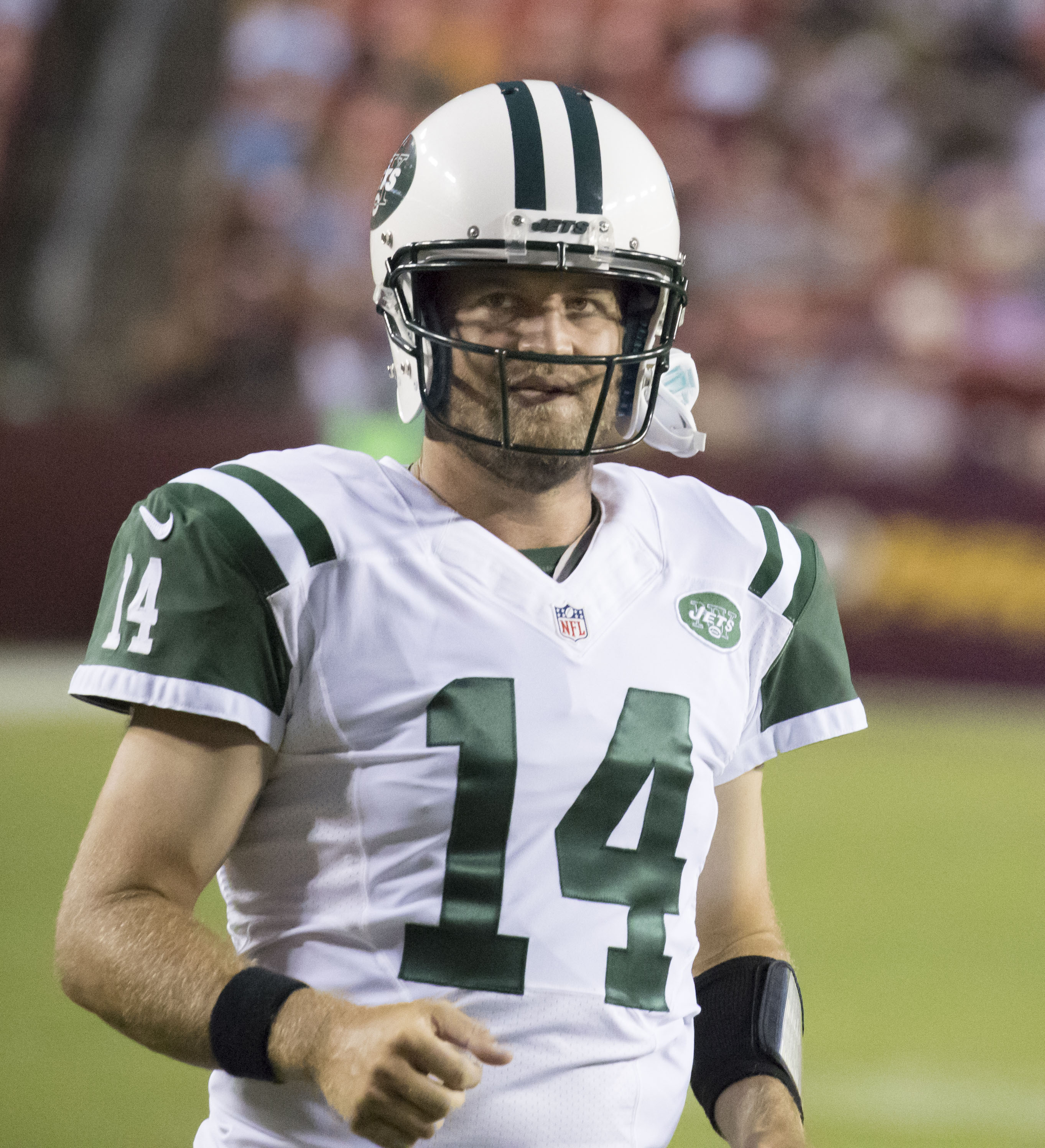
Fitzpatrick with the Jets in 2016

Fitzpatrick, a free agent after the 2015 season, signed a one-year fully guaranteed $12 million contract with the Jets on July 27, 2016.

During the narrow season-opening 23–22 loss to the Cincinnati Bengals, Fitzpatrick threw for 189 yards, two touchdowns, and an interception. In the next game on Thursday Night Football against the Buffalo Bills, he gradually improved with 374 passing yards and a touchdown, leading the Jets to a 37–31 victory to earn AFC Offensive Player of the Week honors. The following week against the Kansas City Chiefs, the Jets committed eight turnovers, including Fitzpatrick throwing six interceptions. Fitzpatrick finished with 188 passing yards as the Jets lost on the road by a score of 24–3. During a Week 6 28–3 road loss to the Arizona Cardinals, Fitzpatrick was benched for Geno Smith after going 16-for-31 for 174 yards, no touchdowns, and an interception.

Smith was then named the starter for the next game against the Baltimore Ravens. However, he suffered a season-ending injury and was replaced by Fitzpatrick in the second quarter. Fitzpatrick then started the team's next two games against the Cleveland Browns and Miami Dolphins before sitting out against the Los Angeles Rams due to injury. Bryce Petty started in his place even though Fitzpatrick was still active for the game as the backup. Fitzpatrick then returned from his injury to start the next two games against the New England Patriots and Indianapolis Colts. However, during the Colts game, he was benched for Petty to start the second half.

Petty was then named the starter for the final four games of the season. Jets head coach Todd Bowles said, "The plan was for us to start him the last four games anyway, so we just started a half early." Petty then started the next three games against the San Francisco 49ers, Miami Dolphins, and New England Patriots. During the Dolphins game, Fitzpatrick relieved Petty due to injury early in the fourth quarter. Petty also suffered an injury in the Patriots game and was replaced by Fitzpatrick in the second quarter. Due to Petty's injury, Fitzpatrick started in the regular season finale, completing 20 of 30 passes for 210 yards and two touchdowns as the Jets beat the Bills by a score of 30–10.

Fitzpatrick finished the 2016 season with 2,710 passing yards, 12 touchdowns, and 17 interceptions to go along with 33 carries for 130 yards in 14 games and 11 starts.

On February 15, 2017, Fitzpatrick's contract was voided, and he became a free agent.

=== Tampa Bay Buccaneers ===
==== 2017 season ====
On May 19, 2017, the Tampa Bay Buccaneers signed Fitzpatrick to a one-year, $3 million contract.

During a Week 6 38–33 road loss to the Arizona Cardinals, Fitzpatrick entered the game after starter Jameis Winston suffered a shoulder injury in the second quarter. Fitzpatrick finished the game by completing 22 of 32 passes for 290 yards, three touchdowns, and two interceptions. Three weeks later against the New Orleans Saints, Fitzpatrick entered the game after Winston suffered another shoulder injury, completing eight of 15 passes for 68 yards and a touchdown in the 30–10 road loss. On November 6, head coach Dirk Koetter said that Winston would miss at least two weeks to rest his shoulder. Fitzpatrick started in Week 10 against his former team, the New York Jets, throwing for 187 yards, a touchdown, and an interception as the Buccaneers won by a score of 15–10. In the next game against the Miami Dolphins, Fitzpatrick threw for 275 yards and two touchdowns as the Buccaneers won on the road by a score of 30–20. The following week against the Atlanta Falcons, he threw for 283 yards as the Buccaneers lost on the road by a score of 34–20.

Fitzpatrick finished the 2017 season with 1,103 passing yards, seven touchdowns, and three interceptions to go along with 15 carries for 78 yards in six games and three starts.

==== 2018 season ====
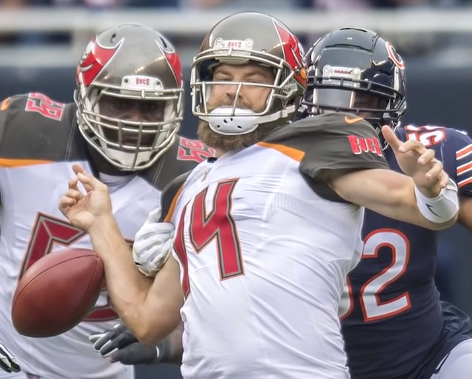
Fitzpatrick with the Tampa Bay Buccaneers in 2018

On March 9, 2018, Fitzpatrick signed a one-year contract extension with the Buccaneers. Starter Jameis Winston was handed a three-game suspension, making Fitzpatrick the Buccaneers' starting quarterback to begin the season.

During the season-opening 48–40 road victory over the New Orleans Saints, Fitzpatrick completed 21 of 28 passes for a career-high 417 yards and four touchdowns, while also rushing for 36 yards and a touchdown, finishing with a 156.2 quarterback rating. He was named NFC Offensive Player of the Week for his performance. In the next game against the Philadelphia Eagles, Fitzpatrick completed 27 of 33 passes for 402 yards and four touchdowns, finishing with a 144.4 quarterback rating despite an interception (which was after a juggle his receiver made) as the Buccaneers won by a score of 27–21. He earned his second consecutive NFC Offensive Player of the Week for his performance. Fitzpatrick's unexpectedly incredible performance during the first two weeks of the season revived his "Fitzmagic" nickname. The following week against the Pittsburgh Steelers on Monday Night Football, Fitzpatrick finished with 411 passing yards, three touchdowns, and three interceptions as the Buccaneers lost by a score of 30–27. He became the first player in NFL history to throw for over 400 yards in three consecutive games. During a Week 4 48–10 road loss to the Chicago Bears, Fitzpatrick's performance regressed as he only threw for 126 yards and an interception. Fitzpatrick was replaced by Winston, who had just been reinstated from a three-game suspension.

During a Week 8 37–34 road loss to the Cincinnati Bengals, Fitzpatrick relieved Winston at the end of the third quarter after Winston was benched after throwing for 276 yards, a touchdown, and four interceptions. Fitzpatrick completed 11 of 15 passes for 194 yards and two touchdowns to tie the game 34–34 with 1:05 left in the game after being down 34–16, but the Bengals would then drive down the field and kick a game-winning field goal as time expired. The next day, the Buccaneers named Fitzpatrick their starting quarterback. In the next game against the Carolina Panthers, he threw for 243 yards, four touchdowns, and two interceptions as the Buccaneers lost on the road by a score of 42–28. The following week against the Washington Redskins, Fitzpatrick had his fourth 400-yard passing game of the season, throwing for 406 yards and two interceptions, which tied Dan Marino and Peyton Manning for the single-season record as the Buccaneers lost by a score of 16–3. During a narrow Week 11 38–35 road loss to the New York Giants, Fitzpatrick was benched for Winston again in the second half after throwing for 167 yards and three interceptions in what would be his final appearance of the 2018 season.

Fitzpatrick finished the 2018 season with 2,366 passing yards, 17 touchdowns, and 12 interceptions for a career-high passer rating of 100.4 to go along with 36 carries for 152 yards and two touchdowns in eight games and seven starts.

=== Miami Dolphins ===
==== 2019 season ====
On March 18, 2019, Fitzpatrick signed a two-year, $11 million contract with the Miami Dolphins. He was named the Dolphins starting quarterback over Josh Rosen.

During the season-opening 59–10 loss to the Baltimore Ravens, Fitzpatrick threw for 185 yards, a touchdown, and an interception. In the next game against the New England Patriots, he threw for 89 yards and was intercepted thrice, with two being pick-sixes, before being benched for Rosen in the 43–0 shutout loss. After the game, Dolphins' head coach Brian Flores said that Fitzpatrick would still be the starter in Week 3 against the Dallas Cowboys, but on September 19, prior to the game, Rosen was named the starter, sending Fitzpatrick to the bench.

During a narrow Week 6 17–16 loss to the Washington Redskins, Fitzpatrick relieved Rosen after the latter was benched for poor performance. Fitzpatrick threw for 132 yards and a touchdown. After leading Miami to a last-minute touchdown, he attempted a two-point conversion pass to Kenyan Drake, who dropped it, sealing the loss for Miami. Fitzpatrick started the next game against the Buffalo Bills, his former team, leading the Dolphins to a 14–9 halftime lead. However, after he threw an interception to cornerback Tre'Davious White, the Bills rallied in the fourth quarter to win. Fitzpatrick finished the 31–21 road loss with 282 passing yards, a touchdown, and an interception to go along with six carries for 13 yards and a touchdown. Two weeks later against another of his former teams, the New York Jets, Fitzpatrick threw for 288 yards and three touchdowns as the Dolphins won their first game of the season by a score of 26–18. During a Week 13 37–31 victory over the Philadelphia Eagles, he threw for 365 yards, three touchdowns, and an interception. Three weeks later against the Cincinnati Bengals, Fitzpatrick threw for 419 yards, four touchdowns, and an interception as the Dolphins won by a score of 38–35 in overtime. He was named AFC Offensive Player of the Week for his performance against the Bengals. In the regular season finale against the Patriots, Fitzpatrick threw for 320 yards and a touchdown and rushed for 15 yards and a touchdown during the 27–24 road victory. The win denied the Patriots a first-round bye for the first time since 2009. He also played against Tom Brady in his final regular season game as a Patriot, as Brady would sign with the Tampa Bay Buccaneers in the offseason. Fitzpatrick is also the only quarterback to defeat Tom Brady with all the Patriots’ division rivals.

Fitzpatrick finished the 2019 season with 3,529 passing yards, 20 touchdowns, and 13 interceptions to go along with 54 carries for 243 yards and four touchdowns in 15 games and 13 starts. He ended up being the team's leading rusher for the 2019 season.

==== 2020 season ====
On September 7, 2020, Fitzpatrick was confirmed to have won the Dolphins starting job for the second year in a row after beating out rookie quarterback Tua Tagovailoa in training camp.

During the season-opening 21–11 road loss against the New England Patriots, Fitzpatrick threw for 191 yards and three interceptions. In the next game against the Buffalo Bills, he had 328 passing yards and two touchdowns as the Dolphins lost by a score of 31–28. The following week against the Jacksonville Jaguars, Fitzpatrick threw for 160 yards and two touchdowns to go along with seven carries for 38 yards and a touchdown during the 31–13 victory. In doing so, he extended his NFL record for wins against a single opponent with different teams to six. Fitzpatrick also joined Walter Payton as the only players since 1948 to finish with two passing touchdowns, a rushing touchdown, 20 rushing yards, and a reception in the same game.

During a Week 5 43–17 road victory over the San Francisco 49ers, Fitzpatrick threw for 350 yards and three touchdowns. In the next game against one of his former teams, the New York Jets, Fitzpatrick threw for 191 yards, three touchdowns, and two interceptions during the 24–0 shutout victory. Two days later on October 20, Brian Flores named Tagovailoa the team's starting quarterback for the Week 8 matchup against the Los Angeles Rams following the bye week.

During a Week 11 20–13 road loss to the Denver Broncos, Fitzpatrick relieved Tagovailoa in the fourth quarter after he was benched for poor performance. During the game, Fitzpatrick threw for 117 yards and an interception. Fitzpatrick was named the Dolphins' starting quarterback for the next game against the Jets after Tagovailoa jammed his thumb in practice. During that game, Fitzpatrick threw for 257 yards and a touchdown in the 20–3 road victory.

During a narrow Week 16 26–25 road victory over the Las Vegas Raiders, Fitzpatrick was brought in to relieve Tagovailoa early in the fourth quarter after the latter was benched. Fitzpatrick led a game-winning drive where he found Mack Hollins for a 34-yard completion down while having his face mask pulled with 19 seconds left in the game and down 25–23 with no timeouts. The pass, coupled with the 15-yard face mask penalty, led to a game-winning field goal by Jason Sanders. Fitzpatrick finished the game throwing for 182 yards and a 59-yard touchdown to Myles Gaskin. On December 31, 2020, Fitzpatrick was placed on the Dolphins' reserve/COVID-19 list. Without Fitzpatrick available, the Dolphins lost their Week 17 rematch with the Bills on the road by a score of 56–26 with Tagovailoa at quarterback and were eliminated from postseason contention when the Indianapolis Colts won later that day. Fitzpatrick was activated from the list on January 11, 2021.

Fitzpatrick finished the 2020 season with 2,091 passing yards, 13 touchdowns, and eight interceptions to go along with 30 carries for 151 yards and two touchdowns in nine games and seven starts.

=== Washington Football Team ===
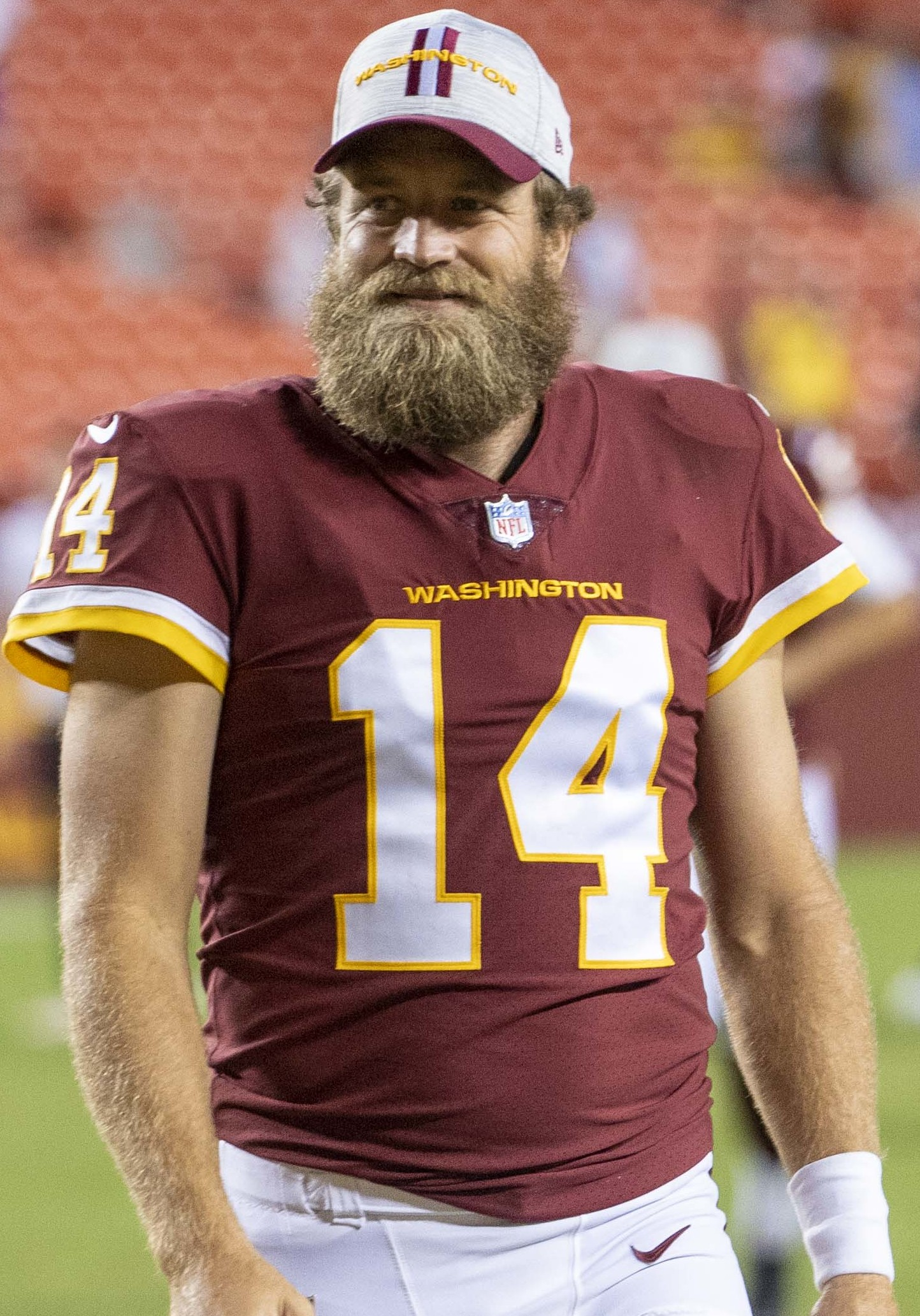
Fitzpatrick with the Washington Football Team in 2021

Fitzpatrick signed a one-year contract with the Washington Football Team on March 18, 2021.

Fitzpatrick started in the season-opening 20–16 loss to the Los Angeles Chargers, but suffered a hip subluxation during the second quarter, which resulted in his being placed on injured reserve and missing the rest of the season. Due to his brief tenure, Fitzpatrick did not have any touchdowns or interceptions with Washington, the only time he did not do so with a team he played for.

=== Retirement ===
On June 2, 2022, Fitzpatrick announced his retirement from the NFL after 17 seasons.

== NFL career statistics ==
Legend
	Led the league
**Bold**	Career high

Year	Team	Games			Passing									Rushing					Sacks		Fumbles (Note: Fumbles lost data taken from Pro Football Reference career game log)	
Year	Team	GP	GS	Record	Cmp	Att	Pct	Yds	Y/A	Lng	TD	Int	Rtg	Att	Yds	Y/A	Lng	TD	Sck	Yds	Fum	Lost
2005	STL	4	3	0–3	76	135	56.3	777	5.8	56	4	8	58.2	14	64	4.6	14	2	9	49	3	1
2006	STL	1	0	—	0	0	—	0	—	0	0	0	—	3	0	0.0	2	0	0	0	0	0
2007	CIN	1	0	—	0	0	—	0	—	0	0	0	—	0	0	—	0	0	0	0	0	0
2008	CIN	13	12	4–7–1	221	372	59.4	1,905	5.1	79	8	9	70.0	**60**	**304**	5.1	22	2	38	193	**11**	5
2009	BUF	10	8	4–4	127	227	55.9	1,422	6.3	**98**	9	10	69.7	31	141	4.5	**31**	1	21	127	3	2
2010	BUF	13	13	4–9	255	441	57.8	3,000	6.8	65	23	15	81.8	40	269	**6.7**	22	0	24	145	8	3
2011	BUF	16	16	6–10	**353**	**569**	62.0	3,832	6.7	60	24	**23**	79.1	56	215	3.8	18	0	22	148	7	2
2012	BUF	16	16	6–10	306	505	60.6	3,400	6.7	68	24	16	83.3	48	197	4.1	20	1	30	161	8	**6**
2013	TEN	11	9	3–6	217	350	62.0	2,454	7.0	77	14	12	82.0	43	225	5.2	26	3	21	109	9	2
2014	HOU	12	12	6–6	197	312	63.1	2,483	8.0	76	17	8	95.3	50	184	3.7	16	2	21	83	5	1
2015	NYJ	16	16	**10–6**	335	562	59.6	**3,905**	6.9	69	**31**	15	88.0	**60**	270	4.5	19	2	19	94	5	2
2016	NYJ	14	11	3–8	228	403	56.6	2,710	6.7	57	12	17	69.6	33	130	3.9	14	0	19	81	9	1
2017	TB	6	3	2–1	96	163	58.9	1,103	6.8	41	7	3	86.0	15	78	5.2	15	0	7	34	0	0
2018	TB	8	7	2–5	164	246	66.7	2,366	**9.6**	75	17	12	**100.4**	36	152	4.2	18	2	14	76	4	1
2019	MIA	15	13	5–8	311	502	62.0	3,529	7.0	51	20	13	85.5	54	243	4.5	20	**4**	**40**	**209**	9	2
2020	MIA	9	7	4–3	183	267	**68.5**	2,091	7.8	70	13	8	95.6	30	151	5.0	17	2	14	65	2	0
2021	WAS	1	1	0–1	3	6	50.0	13	2.2	6	0	0	56.2	1	2	2.0	2	0	1	2	1	0
Career		166	147	59–87–1	3,072	5,060	60.7	34,990	6.9	98	223	169	82.3	575	2,623	4.6	31	21	300	1,576	84	28

== Career highlights ==
=== Awards and honors ===
- NFL Rookie of the Week (Week 12, 2005)
- AFC Offensive Player of the Month (September 2011)
- 5× AFC Offensive Player of the Week (Week 13, 2014; Week 14, Week 16, 2015; Week 2, 2016; Week 16, 2019)
- 3× NFC Offensive Player of the Week (Week 12, 2005; Week 1, 2018; Week 2, 2018)
- 2× FedEx Air NFL Player of the Week (Week 13, 2014; Week 1, 2018)
- Castrol Edge Clutch Performer of the Week (Week 16, 2015)
- Ed Block Courage Award (2015)
- Miami Dolphins Dan Marino Most Valuable Player Award (2019)
- Miami Dolphins Don Shula Leadership Award (2020)

=== Records ===
==== NFL records ====
- Most teams to have started a game for: 9 (Rams, Bengals, Bills, Titans, Texans, Jets, Buccaneers, Dolphins, Washington)
- Most NFL teams played for, quarterbacks (9 teams, tied with Josh McCown) (Note: Quarterback Josh Johnson has been signed to 14 NFL teams but only played in regular season games for seven of them.)
- Most consecutive regular-season games with at least two touchdown passes in one stadium during a season: 9 (MetLife Stadium, 2015)
- Most career passing touchdowns by an Ivy League graduate: 223
- First quarterback to start a game against one opponent (Jacksonville Jaguars) with six different teams (St. Louis Rams, Buffalo Bills, Houston Texans, New York Jets, Tampa Bay Buccaneers, Miami Dolphins)
- First quarterback to throw four touchdown passes in a single game with six different teams (Buffalo Bills, Tennessee Titans, Houston Texans, New York Jets, Tampa Bay Buccaneers, Miami Dolphins)
- First quarterback to start and win against same opponent (Jacksonville Jaguars) with six different teams
- Most touchdown passes of at least 50 yards through a team's first two games: 4 (tied with Joe Namath)
- Most consecutive games of 400 yards passing and four touchdowns to begin a season: 2 (2018)
- Most consecutive games of 400 yards passing to begin a season: 3 (2018)
- Most consecutive games of 400 yards passing: 3 (2018)
- Most games with at least 400 passing yards in a single season: 4 (tied with Dan Marino and Peyton Manning)
- Most 300-yard games with different teams: 7 (Rams, Bills, Titans, Texans, Jets, Buccaneers, Dolphins)
- Only player to pass for a touchdown against one opponent (Eagles) with seven different franchises (Rams, Bengals, Bills, Texans, Jets, Buccaneers, Dolphins) in his career.
- Only player to pass for a touchdown for eight different teams (Rams, Bengals, Bills, Titans, Texans, Jets, Buccaneers, Dolphins)
- Only player to rush for a touchdown for eight different teams (Rams, Bengals, Bills, Titans, Texans, Jets, Buccaneers, Dolphins)

==== Bills franchise records ====
- Longest touchdown pass by a Bills player: 98 yards (against Jacksonville Jaguars on November 22, 2009; tied with Josh Allen)

==== Texans franchise records ====
- Most passing touchdowns in a single game: 6 (against Tennessee Titans on November 30, 2014)

==== Jets franchise records ====
- Most passing touchdowns in a season: 31 (2015)

==== Buccaneers franchise records ====
- Only quarterback with consecutive weeks of 400 yards passing: Weeks 1–3, 2018
- Most games with at least 400 passing yards in a season: 4 (2018)
- Most consecutive weeks of having a passer rating of at least 140.0 in a season: 2 (2018)

== Post-NFL career ==
On June 21, 2022, it was announced that Fitzpatrick would become a pre-game and postgame analyst for Amazon's Thursday Night Football.

In 2023, Fitzpatrick became a spokesman for DraftKings. The following year, Fitzpatrick, along with fellow NFL alumnus and Thursday Night Football analyst Andrew Whitworth, launched the Fitz & Whit podcast under Wave Sports + Entertainment.

== Personal life ==
On June 24, 2006, Fitzpatrick married Liza Barber, whom he met while they were students at Harvard. The couple have three sons and four daughters. Fitzpatrick never removes his wedding ring, including during games; he stated in a 2011 interview it was "important for [him] not to take it off". He was named the fifth-smartest athlete in sports by Sporting News in 2010.

Fitzpatrick is known for his beard, which he began growing out during his time with the Bills in the 2010s. Fitzpatrick has jokingly referred to himself as "the Amish Rifle."

Fitzpatrick continues to support the Bills, attending the Bills' wild card playoff game against the New England Patriots in 2021 where he took off his shirt in the stands despite freezing weather. Fitzpatrick has repeated the feat twice to the pleasure of Bills fans, once while interviewing Josh Allen after a Thursday Night Football game, and again while "leading the charge" before a 2024 playoff game against the Baltimore Ravens. Fitzpatrick names Allen as his favorite quarterback to watch.

== See also ==
- List of National Football League career quarterback wins leaders
- List of National Football League career passer rating leaders
- List of National Football League career passing completions leaders
- List of National Football League career passing touchdowns leaders
- List of National Football League career passing yards leaders
