= Gaskin (surname) =

Gaskin is an English surname. It is a variant of the surname 'Gascon'. Notable people with the surname include:

- Arthur Gaskin (1862–1928) British illustrator & designer
- Barbara Gaskin (born 1950), British singer
- Catherine Gaskin (1929–2009), Australian/Irish author of romance novel
- Dave Gaskin (1945-), British athlete
- Edward Gaskin (1918–2001), educator and labor leader
- George J. Gaskin (1863–1920), American singer
- Georgie Gaskin (1866–1934), British designer
- Hannibal Gaskin (born 1997), Guyanese swimmer
- Ina May Gaskin (born 1940), wife of Stephen Gaskin and author of Spiritual Midwifery (1977)
- Leonard Gaskin (1920–2009), American jazz musician
- Louis Gaskin (1967–2023), American convicted murderer
- Myles Gaskin (born 1997), American football player
- Stephen Gaskin (1935–2014), American counterculture icon
- Walter E. Gaskin, Commanding General, U.S. Marine Corps Base Camp Lejeune
- Winifred Gaskin (1916–1977), Guyanese teacher, journalist and politician
