= Gaskin =

Gaskin may refer to:

- Gaskin (surname)
- 9K31 Strela-1 - a Russian military vehicle tagged with the NATO reporting name 'Gaskin'
- Gaskin (horse) - large muscle on the hind leg of a horse or related animal between the stifle and the hock; the relevant section of the leg. Homologous to the human calf

== See also ==
- Gaskin v United Kingdom - European legal case
