= 2020 Miami Dolphins season =

55th season in franchise history

- Owner: Stephen M. Ross
- General manager: Chris Grier
- Head coach: Brian Flores
- Home stadium: Hard Rock Stadium

Results
- Record: 10–6
- Division place: 2nd AFC East
- Playoffs: Did not qualify
- All-Pros: CB Xavien Howard (1st team); K Jason Sanders (1st team); PR Jakeem Grant (2nd team)
- Pro Bowlers: CB Xavien Howard

Uniform
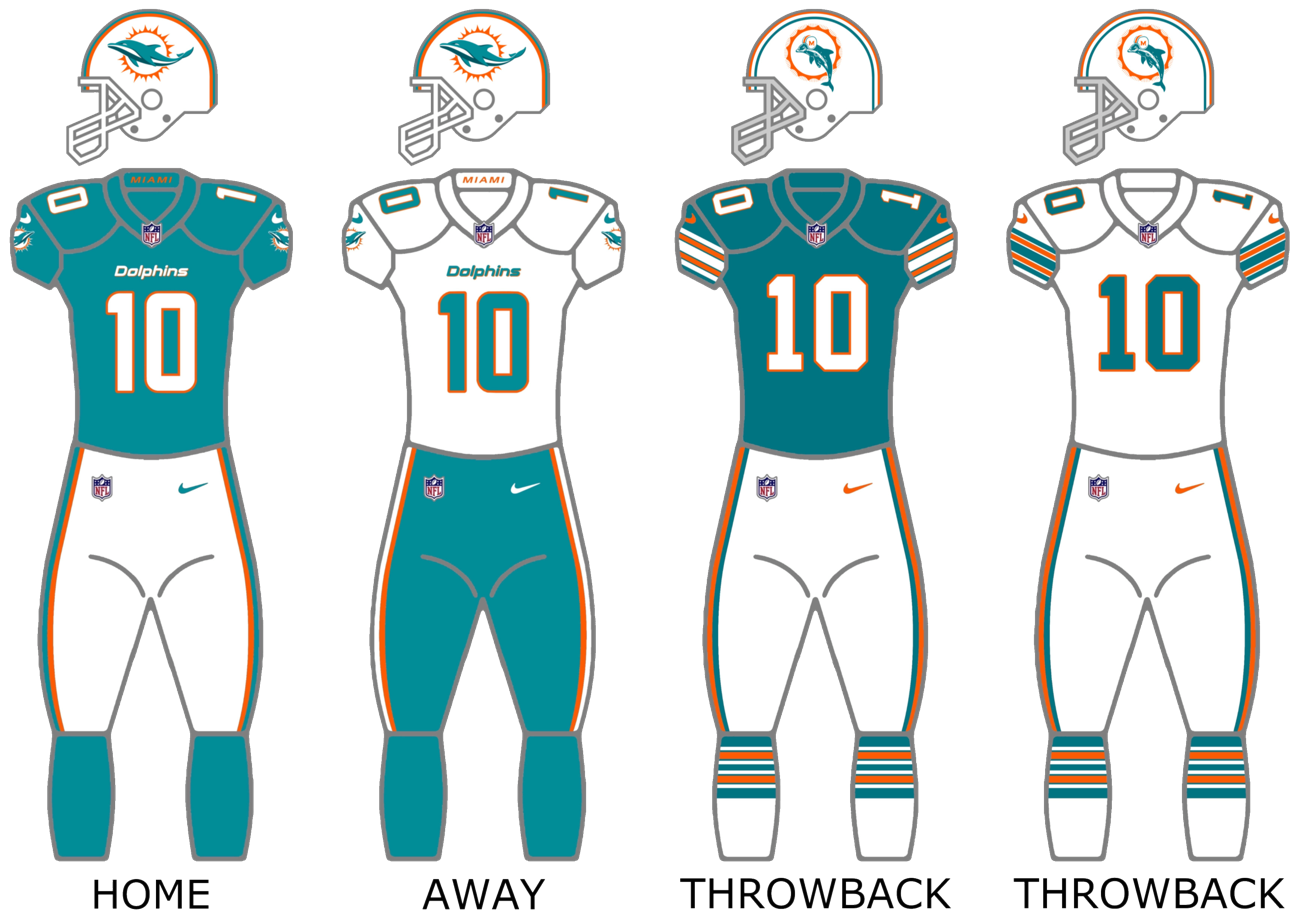

The 2020 season was the Miami Dolphins' 51st in the National Football League (NFL), their 55th overall and their second under head coach Brian Flores.

This was the first season since the 2016 season that the Dolphins finished with a winning record.

Despite being 2nd in their division, and having double digit wins, the Dolphins failed to make the playoffs due to Indianapolis beating the Jaguars in the last week of the season. This was the fourth time in franchise history that the Dolphins failed to make the playoffs with ten wins. Additionally, the Dolphins were the only team to finish the season with a winning record but fail to qualify for the playoffs.

The Dolphins ranked 6th in defense this season.

== Season summary ==
The Dolphins dedicated their 2020 season in memory of legendary Dolphins' head coach Don Shula, who died on May 4, 2020, at the age of 90, at his Indian Creek, Florida home. At both home and away games, the Dolphins wore patches bearing Shula's surname and the number 347, the number of Shula's all-time number of wins in his 32 years as an NFL head coach. Shula, the winningest coach in NFL history, served as Dolphins' head coach from 1970 to 1995 and had led the franchise to five Super Bowl appearances, winning back-to-back championships in 1972 and 1973. Famously, in 1972, Shula led the Dolphins to their first Super Bowl title, as well as the only perfect season by a team since the 1970 AFL-NFL merger.

The Dolphins improved on their 5–11 record from the previous season, following a Week 10 win over the Los Angeles Chargers. After beginning the season 1–3, the Dolphins established themselves as playoff contenders by winning five straight games and starting with a 6–3 record for the first time since 2001. They also started 8–4 for the first time since 2003. The team clinched their first winning season since 2016 after a Week 15 win over the Patriots, which eliminated the Pats from the playoffs for the first time since 2008. On December 26, the Dolphins clinched their first 10-win season since 2016 with a 26–25 victory over the Las Vegas Raiders.

A significant factor in Miami's dramatic improvement over their 2019 season of 5–11 was the story of their defense. In 2019, the Dolphins allowed more points than any other team in the NFL. In 2020, only five teams allowed fewer points-per-game than the Dolphins.

However, despite the improvements, the Dolphins were eliminated from playoff contention for the fourth consecutive year following a blowout loss to the Buffalo Bills and the Indianapolis Colts' victory over the Jacksonville Jaguars in Week 17, becoming the first team to miss the playoffs with 10+ wins since the 2015 Jets, which, coincidentally, were also led by Ryan Fitzpatrick. Despite their elimination from the playoffs, 5th-year cornerback Xavien Howard joined Antonio Cromartie as the only players since the 1970 merger to record at least 10 interceptions in a season, and was the most by a Dolphins player since Dick Westmoreland in 1967. The Dolphins also clinched the rights for the 3rd overall pick in the 2021 NFL draft, which is one of the two first-round picks they received from trading Laremy Tunsil and Kenny Stills to the Houston Texans a season prior. The Dolphins had also finished the 2020 season by scoring a total of 404 points, which is their third highest-scoring total in a season in franchise history (the franchise's highest being 513 total points in 1984).

This season was also highlighted by the emergence of rookie quarterback Tua Tagovailoa, the 5th pick in the 2020 draft, who was named the Dolphins' starter in Week 8, after the team began 3–3 under the leadership of Ryan Fitzpatrick. As the Dolphins' starting quarterback, he went 6–3 and also became the fifth rookie quarterback since the 1970 merger to win his first three starts.

== Signings ==
The Dolphins signed former Dallas Cowboys cornerback Byron Jones, former Philadelphia Eagles running back Jordan Howard, and former New England Patriots linebacker Kyle Van Noy. The Dolphins also picked up San Francisco 49ers' RB Matt Breida in a trade for a fifth-round draft pick which later became Colton McKivitz.

== Free agent signings ==
Position	Player	Age	2019 Team	Contract
RB	Jordan Howard	25	Philadelphia Eagles	2 years, $9.75 million
CB	Byron Jones	27	Dallas Cowboys	5 years, $82 million
OLB	Kyle Van Noy	29	New England Patriots	4 years, $51 million
C	Ted Karras	27	New England Patriots	1 year, $4 million
G	Ereck Flowers	26	Washington Redskins	3 years, $30 million
ILB	Elandon Roberts	26	New England Patriots	1 year, $2 million
SS	Clayton Fejedelem	26	Cincinnati Bengals	3 years, $8.55 million
DE	Emmanuel Ogbah	25	Kansas City Chiefs	2 years, $15 million
OLB	Shaq Lawson	25	Buffalo Bills	3 years, $30 million
ILB	Kamu Grugier-Hill	26	Philadelphia Eagles	1 year, $3 million
FS	Kavon Frazier	25	Dallas Cowboys	1 year, $1 million

== Draft ==
2020 Miami Dolphins Draft
Round	Selection	Player	Position	College	Notes
1	5	Tua Tagovailoa	QB	Alabama	
1	18	Austin Jackson	OT	USC	from Pittsburgh
1	30	Noah Igbinoghene	CB	Auburn	from Green Bay
2	39	Robert Hunt	OT	Louisiana	
2	56	Raekwon Davis	NT	Alabama	from New Orleans
3	70	Brandon Jones	FS	Texas	
4	111	Solomon Kindley	G	Georgia	from Houston
5	154	Jason Strowbridge	DE	North Carolina	from Jacksonville via Pittsburgh
5	164	Curtis Weaver	OLB	Boise State	from Baltimore via Los Angeles Rams
6	185	Blake Ferguson	LS	LSU	
7	246	Malcolm Perry	WR	Navy	from Kansas City

Draft trades

- The Dolphins traded their second-round and fourth-round selections in the 2019 NFL draft to the New Orleans Saints in exchange for their second-round and sixth-round selections in 2019, as well as their second-round selection in 2020.
- The Dolphins traded safety Minkah Fitzpatrick, a fourth-round selection, and a seventh-round selection in the 2021 NFL draft to the Pittsburgh Steelers in exchange for a first-round and fifth-round selection in 2020 as well as a sixth-round selection in 2021.
- The Dolphins traded offensive tackle Laremy Tunsil, wide receiver Kenny Stills, a 2020 fourth-round selection, and a 2021 sixth-round selection to the Houston Texans in exchange for their 2020 first-round selection, as well as their first-round and second-round selections in the 2021 NFL draft, offensive tackle Julién Davenport, and cornerback Johnson Bademosi.
- The Dolphins traded a 2019 second-round selection, as well as their 2020 fifth-selection to the Arizona Cardinals in exchange for quarterback Josh Rosen. They regained this selection after trading running back Kenyan Drake to Arizona.
- The Dolphins traded a seventh-round selection in the 2022 NFL draft to the Los Angeles Rams in exchange for cornerback Aqib Talib and a fifth-round selection in the 2020 NFL Draft.
- The Dolphins traded a sixth-round selection to the Indianapolis Colts in exchange for a conditional seventh-round selection and center Evan Boehm.
- The Dolphins traded a seventh-round selection to the Minnesota Vikings in exchange for guard Danny Isidora.
- The Dolphins traded safety Jordan Lucas to the Kansas City Chiefs in exchange for a seventh-round selection.
- The Dolphins traded a seventh-round selection (251st) to the Seattle Seahawks in exchange for a 2021 sixth-round selection.

== Staff ==
2020 Miami Dolphins staff
Front office: Chairman/managing general partner – Stephen Ross; Vice chairman/partner – Bruce Beal; Vice chairman – Jorge Pérez; Vice chairman – Matt Higgins; Vice chairman, president, and CEO – Tom Garfinkel; General manager – Chris Grier; Assistant general manager – Marvin Allen; Vice president, football administration – Brandon Shore; Senior vice president, chief financial officer – Chris Clements; Senior personnel executive – Reggie McKenzie; Co-director, player personnel – Adam Engroff; Co-director, player personnel – Anthony Hunt; Special advisor to the vice chairman, president, and CEO – Dan Marino; Head coaches: Head coach – Brian Flores; Offensive coaches: Offensive coordinator – Chan Gailey; Quarterbacks – Robby Brown; Running backs – Eric Studesville; Wide receivers – Josh Grizzard; Tight ends – George Godsey; Offensive line – Steve Marshall; Assistant offensive line – Lemuel Jeanpierre; Quality control – Kolby Smith	Defensive coaches: Defensive coordinator – Josh Boyer; Defensive line – Marion Hobby; Assistant defensive line – Rob Leonard; Linebackers – Anthony Campanile; Outside linebackers – Austin Clark; Defensive backs – Gerald Alexander; Assistant defensive backs – Curt Kuntz; Quality control – Mike Judge; Special teams coaches: Special teams coordinator – Danny Crossman; Assistant special teams – Brendan Farrell; Strength and conditioning: Head strength and conditioning – Dave Puloka; Assistant strength and conditioning – Jim Arthur

== Final roster ==
2020 Miami Dolphins roster
Quarterbacks (QB): 5 Jake Rudock; 1 Tua Tagovailoa; Running backs (RB): 26 Salvon Ahmed; 22 Matt Breida; 37 Myles Gaskin; 32 Patrick Laird; 31 DeAndré Washington; Wide receivers (WR): 15 Lynn Bowden; 84 Isaiah Ford; 19 Jakeem Grant RS; 86 Mack Hollins; 11 DeVante Parker; 10 Malcolm Perry; Tight ends (TE): 88 Mike Gesicki; 80 Adam Shaheen; 81 Durham Smythe	Offensive linemen (OL): 70 Julién Davenport T; 77 Jesse Davis G; 63 Michael Deiter C; 75 Ereck Flowers G; 68 Robert Hunt T; 73 Austin Jackson T; 66 Solomon Kindley G; 67 Ted Karras C; 78 Adam Pankey G; Defensive linemen (DL): 98 Raekwon Davis NT; 95 Benito Jones NT; 91 Emmanuel Ogbah DE; 92 Zach Sieler DE; 58 Jason Strowbridge DE; 94 Christian Wilkins DE	Linebackers (LB): 55 Jerome Baker ILB; 49 Samuel Eguavoen OLB; 51 Kamu Grugier-Hill ILB; 90 Shaq Lawson OLB; 48 Calvin Munson ILB; 43 Andrew Van Ginkel OLB; 53 Kyle Van Noy OLB; Defensive backs (DB): 42 Clayton Fejedelem SS; 35 Kavon Frazier FS; 36 Nate Holley S; 25 Xavien Howard CB; 23 Noah Igbinoghene CB; 29 Brandon Jones FS; 24 Byron Jones CB; 28 Bobby McCain FS; 40 Nik Needham CB; 33 Jamal Perry CB; 21 Eric Rowe SS; Special teams (ST): 50 Blake Ferguson LS; 2 Matt Haack P; 7 Jason Sanders K	Practice squad: 97 Nick Coe DE; 41 Brian Cole II S; 38 Javaris Davis CB; 45 Tino Ellis CB; 74 Tyler Gauthier C; 71 Jonathan Hubbard T; 59 Kylan Johnson ILB; 16 Marcus Kemp WR; 46 Akeem King CB; 83 Kirk Merritt WR; 85 Chris Myarick TE; 87 Andre Patton WR; 69 Durval Queiroz-Neto G (IPP); 52 Tyshun Render OLB; 17 Reid Sinnett QB; 60 Rex Sunahara LS; Reserve: 47 Vince Biegel OLB (IR); 14 Ryan Fitzpatrick QB (COVID-19); 56 Davon Godchaux NT (IR); 17 Allen Hurns WR (Opt-out); 96 Jonathan Ledbetter DE (NF-Inj.); 44 Elandon Roberts ILB (IR); 18 Preston Williams WR (IR); 15 Albert Wilson WR (Opt-out); Rookies in italics 52 active, 8 reserve, 15 practice squad (1 exempt)

== Preseason ==
The Dolphins' preseason schedule was announced on May 7, but was later cancelled due to the COVID-19 pandemic.

Week	Date	Opponent	Venue	Result
1	August 14	at Atlanta Falcons	Mercedes-Benz Stadium	Cancelled due to the COVID-19 pandemic
2	August 20	Philadelphia Eagles	Hard Rock Stadium	Cancelled due to the COVID-19 pandemic
3	August 27	Detroit Lions	Hard Rock Stadium	Cancelled due to the COVID-19 pandemic
4	September 3	at New Orleans Saints	Mercedes-Benz Superdome	Cancelled due to the COVID-19 pandemic

== Regular season ==
=== Schedule ===
The Dolphins' 2020 schedule was announced on May 7.

Week	Date	Opponent	Result	Record	Venue	Recap
1	September 13	at **New England Patriots**	**L** 11–21	0–1	Gillette Stadium	Recap
2	September 20	**Buffalo Bills**	**L** 28–31	0–2	Hard Rock Stadium	Recap
3	September 24	at Jacksonville Jaguars	**W** 31–13	1–2	TIAA Bank Field	Recap
4	October 4	Seattle Seahawks	**L** 23–31	1–3	Hard Rock Stadium	Recap
5	October 11	at San Francisco 49ers	**W** 43–17	2–3	Levi's Stadium	Recap
6	October 18	**New York Jets**	**W** 24–0	3–3	Hard Rock Stadium	Recap
7	Bye					
8	November 1	Los Angeles Rams	**W** 28–17	4–3	Hard Rock Stadium	Recap
9	November 8	at Arizona Cardinals	**W** 34–31	5–3	State Farm Stadium	Recap
10	November 15	Los Angeles Chargers	**W** 29–21	6–3	Hard Rock Stadium	Recap
11	November 22	at Denver Broncos	**L** 13–20	6–4	Empower Field at Mile High	Recap
12	November 29	at **New York Jets**	**W** 20–3	7–4	MetLife Stadium	Recap
13	December 6	Cincinnati Bengals	**W** 19–7	8–4	Hard Rock Stadium	Recap
14	December 13	Kansas City Chiefs	**L** 27–33	8–5	Hard Rock Stadium	Recap
15	December 20	**New England Patriots**	**W** 22–12	9–5	Hard Rock Stadium	Recap
16	December 26	at Las Vegas Raiders	**W** 26–25	10–5	Allegiant Stadium	Recap
17	January 3	at **Buffalo Bills**	**L** 26–56	10–6	Bills Stadium	Recap

Note: Intra-division opponents are in bold text.

=== Game summaries ===
==== Week 1: at New England Patriots ====
Week One: Miami Dolphins at New England Patriots – Game summary

Quarter	1	2	3	4	Total
Dolphins	0	3	0	8	**11**
**Patriots**	0	7	7	7	**21**

at Gillette Stadium, Foxborough, Massachusetts

- Date: September 13
- Game time: 1:00 p.m. EDT
- Game weather: Partly cloudy, 70 °F (21 °C)
- Game attendance: 0
- Referee: Adrian Hill
- TV announcers (CBS): Jim Nantz, Tony Romo, Tracy Wolfson, and Gene Steratore
- Recap, Game Book

Game information

**First quarter**

- No scoring plays.

**Second quarter**

- NE – Cam Newton 4-yard run (Nick Folk kick), 13:12 Patriots 7–0. **Drive: 11 plays, 80 yards, 6:11.**
- MIA – Jason Sanders 46-yard field goal, 3:53 Patriots 7–3. **Drive: 10 plays, 59 yards, 5:16.**

**Third quarter**

- NE – Cam Newton 11-yard run (Nick Folk kick), 10:14 Patriots 14–3. **Drive: 8 plays, 75 yards, 4:46.**

**Fourth quarter**

- MIA – Jordan Howard 1-yard run (Ryan Fitzpatrick run), 10:31 Patriots 14–11. **Drive: 11 plays, 80 yards, 5:23.**
- NE – Sony Michel 1-yard run (Nick Folk kick), 5:23 Patriots 21–11. **Drive: 10 plays, 75 yards, 5:08.**

**Top passers**

- MIA – Ryan Fitzpatrick – 20/30, 191 yards, 3 INT
- NE – Cam Newton – 15/19, 155 yards

**Top rushers**

- MIA – Myles Gaskin – 9 rushes, 40 yards
- NE – Cam Newton – 15 rushes, 75 yards, 2 TD

**Top receivers**

- MIA – DeVante Parker – 4 receptions, 47 yards
- NE – Julian Edelman – 5 receptions, 57 yards

This was the Patriots' first game without long-time quarterback Tom Brady since October 2, 2016, and their first without Brady on the roster since January 2, 2000. The 2020 season opener featured quarterback Cam Newton taking the reins of the New England offense in his inaugural game as a member of the Patriots. Newton looked crisp in his first game in over a year as he scored twice on the ground in an offensive ground attack that compiled 217 yards rushing. Cam Newton scrambled for 75 yards on the ground and completed 15 of 19 passing, which left Miami's defense frustrated the entire day. Miami's offense struggled as well due to three interceptions thrown by veteran quarterback Ryan Fitzpatrick. Due to the COVID-19 pandemic, no fans were in the stands and fake crowd noise was piped onto the playing field. With the loss, the Dolphins fell to 0–1.

==== Week 2: vs. Buffalo Bills ====
Week Two: Buffalo Bills at Miami Dolphins – Game summary

Quarter	1	2	3	4	Total
**Bills**	7	10	0	14	**31**
Dolphins	7	3	3	15	**28**

at Hard Rock Stadium, Miami Gardens, Florida

- Date: September 20
- Game time: 1:00 p.m. EDT
- Game weather: Cloudy, 90 °F (32 °C)
- Game attendance: 11,075
- Referee: Jerome Boger
- TV announcers (CBS): Spero Dedes and Adam Archuleta
- Recap, Game Book

Game information

**First quarter**

- BUF – Reggie Gilliam 1-yard pass from Josh Allen (Tyler Bass kick), 4:55 Bills 7–0. **Drive: 11 plays, 97 yards, 5:19.**
- MIA – DeVante Parker 2-yard pass from Ryan Fitzpatrick (Jason Sanders kick), 0:38 Tied 7–7. **Drive: 10 plays, 75 yards, 4:17.**

**Second quarter**

- BUF – Stefon Diggs 22-yard pass from Josh Allen (Tyler Bass kick), 11:40 Bills 14–7. **Drive: 5 plays, 84 yards, 2:58.**
- BUF – Tyler Bass 39-yard pass from Josh Allen (Tyler Bass kick), 2:30 Bills 17–7. **Drive: 13 plays, 73 yards, 6:13.**
- MIA – Jason Sanders 52-yard field goal, 0:02 Bills 17–10. **Drive: 5 plays, 41 yards, 0:31.**

**Third quarter**

- MIA – Jason Sanders 45-yard field goal, 11:18 Bills 17–13. **Drive: 8 plays, 48 yards, 3:42.**

**Fourth quarter**

- MIA – Jordan Howard 2-yard run (Jason Sanders kick), 10:11 Dolphins 20–17. **Drive: 10 plays, 44 yards, 5:13.**
- BUF – Gabe Davis 6-yard pass from Josh Allen (Tyler Bass kick), 5:55 Bills 24–20. **Drive: 7 plays, 75 yards, 4:16.**
- BUF – John Brown 46-yard pass from Josh Allen (Tyler Bass kick), 3:09 Bills 31–20. **Drive: 5 plays, 71 yards, 1:17.**
- MIA – Mike Gesicki 8-yard pass from Ryan Fitzpatrick (Ryan Fitzpatrick–Preston Williams pass), 0:49 Bills 31–28. **Drive: 9 plays, 75 yards, 2:20.**

**Top passers**

- BUF – Josh Allen – 24/35, 415 yards, 4 TD
- MIA – Ryan Fitzpatrick – 31/47, 328 yards, 2 TD

**Top rushers**

- BUF – Devin Singletary – 10 rushes, 56 yards
- MIA – Myles Gaskin – 7 rushes, 46 yards

**Top receivers**

- BUF – Stefon Diggs – 8 receptions, 153 yards, TD
- MIA – Mike Gesicki – 8 receptions, 130 yards, TD

Before play began, both teams stayed in their respective locker rooms for the playing of the national anthem. Miami, hoping to recover from their Week 1 loss, kept it close, but no cigar. Josh Allen, improving his offensive gamesmanship for a third NFL season, threw for a career-best 417 yards and four TDs extending the Bills’ winning streak to four-straight against the Fins. With 5:55 remaining in the 4th quarter and trailing 20-17, Allen threw a strike to the endzone for the score, after which, Buffalo never looked back. Buffalo's offense rolled over Miami for 524 total yards; 342 in the first half. At one point the Dolphins were poised to score from the Buffalo one-yard-line in the third quarter, but failed to connect on a 4th-down toss to the endzone. After the game, Dolphins’ head coach Brian Flores said. “You've got to finish in this league if you want to win." Nevertheless, Miami stayed in the game to the finish. Ryan Fitzapatrick completed 31 of 47 pass attempts, but it wasn't enough to overcome a Buffalo offense that had a banner day in South Florida. The Bills-Dolphins rivalry has undeniably been reignited. With the loss, the Dolphins fell to 0–2.

==== Week 3: at Jacksonville Jaguars ====
Week Three: Miami Dolphins at Jacksonville Jaguars – Game summary

Quarter	1	2	3	4	Total
**Dolphins**	14	7	7	3	**31**
Jaguars	0	7	0	6	**13**

at TIAA Bank Field, Jacksonville, Florida

- Date: September 24
- Game time: 8:20 p.m. EDT
- Game weather: Partly cloudy, 81 °F (27 °C)
- Game attendance: 16,563
- Referee: Brad Allen
- TV announcers (NFLN): Joe Buck, Troy Aikman, Erin Andrews, and Kristina Pink
- Recap, Game Book

Game information

**First quarter**

- MIA – Preston Williams 3-yard pass from Ryan Fitzpatrick (Jason Sanders kick), 8:09. Dolphins 7–0. **Drive: 12 plays, 84 yards, 6:51.**
- MIA – Jordan Howard 1-yard run (Jason Sanders kick), 2:37. Dolphins 14–0. **Drive: 6 plays, 80 yards, 3:17.**

**Second quarter**

- JAX – James Robinson 11-yard run (Brandon Wright kick), 13:04. Dolphins 14–7. **Drive: 9 plays, 75 yards, 4:33.**
- MIA – Mike Gesicki 15-yard pass from Ryan Fitzpatrick (Jason Sanders kick), 5:58. Dolphins 21–7. **Drive: 11 plays, 75 yards, 7:06.**

**Third quarter**

- MIA – Ryan Fitzpatrick 1-yard run (Jason Sanders kick), 2:01. Dolphins 28–7. **Drive: 4 plays, 5 yards, 2:03.**

**Fourth quarter**

- JAX – James Robinson 1-yard run (kick failed), 9:03. Dolphins 28–13. **Drive: 10 plays, 51 yards, 3:11.**
- MIA – Jason Sanders 30-yard field goal, 3:49. Dolphins 31–13. **Drive: 4 plays, 7 yards, 0:58.**

**Top passers**

- MIA – Ryan Fitzpatrick – 18/20, 160 yards, 2 TD
- JAX – Gardner Minshew – 30/42, 275 yards, INT

**Top rushers**

- MIA – Myles Gaskin – 22 rushes, 66 yards
- JAX – James Robinson – 11 rushes, 46 yards, 2 TD

**Top receivers**

- MIA – DeVante Parker – 5 receptions, 69 yards
- JAX – James Robinson – 6 receptions, 83 yards

In this nationally-televised Thursday night match-up, a dominant Ryan Fitzpatrick-led offense scored touchdowns on its first three possessions, pummeling a Jacksonville Jaguars squad that had been a three point favorite at home. On the opposite side of the ball, Gardner Minshew threw two picks and zero TDs, settling the pre-game argument over whose facial hair made them a better QB. Minshew, who came into the game confident after two strong performances to start the 2020 season, looked uncomfortable all night as Miami's defense garnered two sacks and limited the Jaguars to only 13 total points. This was the Dolphins' first win over the Jaguars since 2014 and their first win by 10+ points since a 2017 win over the Denver Broncos. With the win, the Dolphins improved to 1–2.

==== Week 4: vs. Seattle Seahawks ====
Week Four: Seattle Seahawks at Miami Dolphins – Game summary

Quarter	1	2	3	4	Total
**Seahawks**	10	7	0	14	**31**
Dolphins	3	6	3	11	**23**

at Hard Rock Stadium, Miami Gardens, Florida

- Date: October 4
- Game time: 1:00 p.m. EDT
- Game weather: Cloudy, 86 °F (30 °C)
- Game attendance: 12,369
- Referee: Scott Novak
- TV announcers (Fox): Dick Stockton, Brady Quinn and Sara Walsh
- Recap, Game Book

Game information

**First quarter**

- SEA – Chris Carson 1-yard run (Jason Myers kick), 10:00. Seahawks 7–0. **Drive: 6 play, 57 yards, 2:52.**
- MIA – Jason Sanders 41-yard field goal, 2:33. Seahawks 7–3. **Drive: 9 play, 54 yards, 4:02.**
- SEA – Jason Myers 55-yard field goal, 0:07. Seahawks 10–3. **Drive: 7 play, 39 yards, 2:26.**

**Second quarter**

- MIA – Jason Sanders 29-yard field goal, 11:24. Seahawks 10–6. **Drive: 8 play, 64 yards, 3:43.**
- MIA – Jason Sanders 45-yard field goal, 0:24. Seahawks 10–9. **Drive: 10 play, 48 yards, 4:21.**
- SEA – Travis Homer 3-yard pass from Russell Wilson (Jason Myers kick), 0:03. Seahawks 17–9. **Drive: 4 play, 75 yards, 0:21.**

**Third quarter**

- MIA – Jason Sanders 43-yard field goal, 4:07. Seahawks 17–12. **Drive: 10 play, 55 yards, 5:49.**

**Fourth quarter**

- MIA – Jason Sanders 29-yard field goal, 8:31. Seahawks 17–15. **Drive: 17 play, 73 yards, 7:59.**
- SEA – David Moore 17-yard pass from Russell Wilson (Jason Myers kick), 5:24. Seahawks 24–15. **Drive: 6 play, 75 yards, 3:07.**
- SEA – Chris Carson 1-yard run (Jason Myers kick), 4:00. Seahawks 31–15. **Drive: 2 play, 33 yards, 0:16.**
- MIA – Ryan Fitzpatrick 10-yard run (Ryan Fitzpatrick–Preston Williams pass), 1:50. Seahawks 31–23. **Drive: 8 play, 75 yards, 2:10.**

**Top passers**

- SEA – Russell Wilson – 24/34, 360 yards, 2 TD, INT
- MIA – Ryan Fitzpatrick – 29/45, 315 yards, 2 INT

**Top rushers**

- SEA – Chris Carson – 16 rushes, 80 yards, 2 TD
- MIA – Ryan Fitzpatrick – 6 rushes, 47 yards, TD

**Top receivers**

- SEA – DK Metcalf – 4 receptions, 106 yards
- MIA – DeVante Parker – 10 receptions, 110 yards

On a hot day in south Florida, the Seahawks came in to Hard Rock Stadium unbeaten and left with an unblemished record of 4-0. The Fins were unable to stop Russell Wilson's air offensive allowing him 360 yards passing and two completions to the endzone. Miami's defense had no answers as the ‘Hawks continued their streak of scoring 30 points or more in every game this season. The Dolphins were able to score on their first five possessions, but all five trips into Seattle territory ended disappointingly with a field goal. Ryan Fitzpatrick might have had a solid performance (29 of 45 passing), but two interceptions ultimately resulted in a dispiriting home-field loss for his squad. This was the Seahawks' first road win over the Dolphins since 1996, when the Seahawks were part of the AFC West. With the loss, the Dolphins fell to 1–3.

==== Week 5: at San Francisco 49ers ====
Week Five: Miami Dolphins at San Francisco 49ers – Game summary

Quarter	1	2	3	4	Total
**Dolphins**	14	16	7	6	**43**
49ers	0	7	10	0	**17**

at Levi's Stadium, Santa Clara, California

- Date: October 11
- Game time: 4:05 p.m. EDT/1:05 p.m. PDT
- Game weather: Sunny, 73 °F (23 °C)
- Game attendance: 0
- Referee: Land Clark
- TV announcers (Fox): Adam Amin, Mark Schlereth and Lindsay Czarniak
- Recap, Game Book

Game information

**First quarter**

- MIA – Adam Shaheen 3-yard pass from Ryan Fitzpatrick (Jason Sanders kick), 10:45. Dolphins 7–0. **Drive: 7 plays, 79 yards, 2:52.**
- MIA – Myles Gaskin 1-yard run (Jason Sanders kick), 4:14. Dolphins 14–0. **Drive: 7 plays, 56 yards, 3:19.**

**Second quarter**

- SF – Kyle Juszczyk 7-yard run (Robbie Gould kick), 12:07. Dolphins 14–7. **Drive: 3 plays, 49 yards, 1:18.**
- MIA – DeVante Parker 22-yard pass from Ryan Fitzpatrick (Jason Sanders kick), 7:29. Dolphins 21–7. **Drive: 7 plays, 78 yards, 4:38.**
- MIA – Jason Sanders 26-yard field goal, 2:00. Dolphins 24–7. **Drive: 6 plays, 71 yards, 2:40.**
- MIA – Jason Sanders 50-yard field goal, 0:38. Dolphins 27–7. **Drive: 4 plays, 5 yards, 1:03.**
- MIA – Jason Sanders 29-yard field goal, 0:00. Dolphins 30–7. **Drive: 3 plays, 8 yards, 0:14.**

**Third quarter**

- SF – Kendrick Bourne 19-yard pass from C. J. Beathard (Robbie Gould kick), 8:07. Dolphins 30–14. **Drive: 9 plays, 74 yards, 3:20.**
- MIA – Preston Williams 32-yard pass from Ryan Fitzpatrick (Jason Sanders kick), 4:42. Dolphins 37–14. **Drive: 7 plays, 75 yards, 3:25.**
- SF – Robbie Gould 37-yard field goal, 0:46. Dolphins 37–17. **Drive: 9 plays, 56 yards, 3:56.**

**Fourth quarter**

- MIA – Jason Sanders 31-yard field goal, 8:40. Dolphins 40–17. **Drive: 9 plays, 62 yards, 7:06.**
- MIA – Jason Sanders 49-yard field goal, 5:52. Dolphins 43–17. **Drive: 4 plays, 2 yards, 1:40.**

**Top passers**

- MIA – Ryan Fitzpatrick – 22/28, 350 yards, 3 TD
- SF – C. J. Beathard – 9/18, 94 yards, TD

**Top rushers**

- MIA – Myles Gaskin – 16 rushes, 57 yards, TD
- SF – Raheem Mostert – 11 rushes, 90 yards

**Top receivers**

- MIA – Preston Williams – 4 receptions, 106 yards, TD
- SF – George Kittle – 4 receptions, 44 yards

The Miami Dolphins engineered a good old-fashioned beatdown as they imposed their will on the reigning NFC Champions in Levi's Stadium, California. Ryan Fitzpatrick was magic as he threw 22 of 28 for 350 yards including three touchdowns and no interceptions. Jimmy Garoppolo was hideous and was benched halfway through the game after putting up 7 of 17 passing for a measly 77 yards, no touchdowns and two interceptions. The Fins’ defense carved up the Niners’ offense all day, recovering a fumble, stealing two interceptions, forcing five sacks and allowing a third-down efficiency of only 20%. In this rematch of Super Bowl XIX, this was the Dolphins' first road win over the 49ers since 2004, also their first time since October 25, 2015 scoring over 40 points in a game, and their largest blowout win since December 3, 2017. With the win, the Dolphins improved to 2–3.

==== Week 6: vs. New York Jets ====
Week Six: New York Jets at Miami Dolphins – Game summary

Quarter	1	2	3	4	Total
Jets	0	0	0	0	**0**
**Dolphins**	7	14	3	0	**24**

at Hard Rock Stadium, Miami Gardens, Florida

- Date: October 18
- Game time: 4:05 p.m. EDT
- Game weather: Partly cloudy, 85 °F (29 °C)
- Game attendance: 10,772
- Referee: Bill Vinovich
- TV announcers (CBS): Andrew Catalon, James Lofton, and Sheree Burruss
- Recap, Game Book

Game information

**First quarter**

- MIA – Adam Shaheen 4-yard pass from Ryan Fitzpatrick (Jason Sanders kick), 6:55. Dolphins 7–0. **Drive: 8 plays, 66 yards, 4:44.**

**Second quarter**

- MIA – Preston Williams 3-yard pass from Ryan Fitzpatrick (Jason Sanders kick), 11:16. Dolphins 14–0. **Drive: 7 plays, 65 yards, 3:44.**
- MIA – Durham Smythe 4-yard pass from Ryan Fitzpatrick (Jason Sanders kick), 1:53. Dolphins 21–0. **Drive: 3 plays, 48 yards, 0:41.**

**Third quarter**

- MIA – Jason Sanders 24-yard field goal, 3:49. Dolphins 24–0. **Drive: 8 plays, 53 yards, 3:45.**

**Fourth quarter**

- No scoring plays.

**Top passers**

- NYJ – Joe Flacco – 21/44, 186 yards, INT
- MIA – Ryan Fitzpatrick – 18/27, 191 yards, 3 TD, 2 INT

**Top rushers**

- NYJ – Frank Gore – 11 rushes, 46 yards
- MIA – Myles Gaskin – 18 rushes, 91 yards

**Top passers**

- NYJ – Breshad Perriman – 4 receptions, 62 yards
- MIA – Adam Shaheen – 3 receptions, 51 yards, TD

This was the Dolphins' first shutout win since November 2, 2014, when they defeated the San Diego Chargers 37–0. Jets quarterback Joe Flacco also lost to the Dolphins for the first time in his 12-year career. Rookie Tua Tagovailoa, the 5th overall pick in the 2020 draft made his NFL debut during the final seconds of the game, where he relieved Ryan Fitzpatrick and completed 2 passes for 9 passing yards, also Tua's first game since November 16, 2019 when he suffered a season-ending hip injury as a member of the Alabama Crimson Tide. With the win, the Dolphins improved to 3–3.

==== Week 8: vs. Los Angeles Rams ====
Week Eight: Los Angeles Rams at Miami Dolphins – Game summary

Quarter	1	2	3	4	Total
Rams	7	3	0	7	**17**
**Dolphins**	7	21	0	0	**28**

at Hard Rock Stadium, Miami Gardens, Florida

- Date: November 1
- Game time: 1:00 p.m. EST
- Game weather: Cloudy, 86 °F (30 °C)
- Game attendance: 12,397
- Referee: John Hussey
- TV announcers (Fox): Kenny Albert, Jonathan Vilma and Shannon Spake
- Recap, Game Book

Game information

**First quarter**

- LAR – Robert Woods 4-yard run (Kai Forbath kick), 11:13. Rams 7–0. **Drive: 3 plays, 15 yards, 1:25.**
- MIA – DeVante Parker 3-yard pass from Tua Tagovailoa (Jason Sanders kick), 0:00. Tied 7–7. **Drive: 6 plays, 33 yards, 2:55.**

**Second quarter**

- MIA – Andrew Van Ginkel 78-yard fumble return (Jason Sanders kick), 10:01. Dolphins 14–7.
- MIA – Jakeem Grant 88-yard punt return (Jason Sanders kick), 8:44. Dolphins 21–7.
- MIA – Myles Gaskin 1-yard run (Jason Sanders kick), 2:47. Dolphins 28–7. **Drive: 1 play, 1 yard, 0:04.**
- LAR – Kai Forbath 23-yard field goal, 0:11. Dolphins 28–10. **Drive: 13 plays, 70 yards, 2:36.**

**Third quarter**

- No scoring plays.

**Fourth quarter**

- LAR – Robert Woods 11-yard pass from Jared Goff (Kai Forbath kick), 9:58. Dolphins 28–17. **Drive: 10 plays, 89 yards, 4:09.**

**Top passers**

- LAR – Jared Goff – 35/61, 355 yards, TD, 2 INT
- MIA – Tua Tagovailoa – 12/22, 93 yards, TD

**Top rushers**

- LAR – Darrell Henderson – 8 rushes, 47 yards
- MIA – Myles Gaskin – 18 rushes, 47 yards, TD

**Top receivers**

- LAR – Cooper Kupp – 11 receptions, 110 yards
- MIA – Durham Smythe – 2 receptions, 16 yards

This was rookie quarterback Tua Tagovailoa's first NFL start, with Ryan Fitzpatrick returning to his backup role for the first time since October 13, 2019. The Dolphins also defeated the Rams for the 5th time since 2001. The game was dominated by the Dolphins' defense, which forced the Rams into four first-half turnovers, and allowed the Dolphins to win with only 145 yards of total offense, the lowest yardage compiled by a winning team all season. During the 2nd quarter, linebacker Andrew Van Ginkel scored his first NFL touchdown on a 78-yard fumble recovery, the second-longest fumbled return in franchise history since Dolphins Hall of Famer Jason Taylor ran on an 85-yard fumble return in 2005. With the win, the Dolphins improved to 4–3.

==== Week 9: at Arizona Cardinals ====
Week Nine: Miami Dolphins at Arizona Cardinals – Game summary

Quarter	1	2	3	4	Total
**Dolphins**	14	10	0	10	**34**
Cardinals	7	10	14	0	**31**

at State Farm Stadium, Glendale, Arizona

- Date: November 8
- Game time: 4:25 p.m. EST/2:25 p.m. MST
- Game weather: 66 °F (19 °C) (retractable roof open)
- Game attendance: 4,200
- Referee: Carl Cheffers
- TV announcers (CBS): Andrew Catalon, James Lofton and Michael Grady
- Recap, Game Book

Game information

**First quarter**

- MIA – Shaq Lawson 36-yard fumble return (Jason Sanders kick), 10:37. Dolphins 7–0.
- ARI – Maxx Williams 4-yard pass from Kyler Murray (Zane Gonzalez kick), 4:48. Tied 7–7. **Drive: 10 plays, 75 yards, 3:46.**
- MIA – Jordan Howard 2-yard run (Jason Sanders kick), 0:55. Dolphins 14–7. **Drive: 10 plays, 75 yards, 5:56.**

**Second quarter**

- ARI – Christian Kirk 56-yard pass from Kyler Murray (Zane Gonzalez kick), 14:23. Tied 14–14. **Drive: 4 plays, 75 yards, 1:32.**
- MIA – Preston Williams 9-yard pass from Tua Tagovailoa (Jason Sanders kick), 10:18. Dolphins 21–14. **Drive: 8 plays, 80 yards, 4:05.**
- ARI – Zane Gonzalez 37-yard field goal, 5:10. Dolphins 21–17. **Drive: 11 plays, 56 yards, 5:08.**
- MIA – Jason Sanders 56-yard field goal, 0:03. Dolphins 24–17. **Drive: 6 plays, 26 yards, 0:43.**

**Third quarter**

- ARI – Darrell Daniels 21-yard pass from Kyler Murray (Zane Gonzalez kick), 12:13. Tied 24–24. **Drive: 7 plays, 87 yards, 3:12.**
- ARI – Kyler Murray 12-yard run (Zane Gonzalez kick), 2:34. Cardinals 31–24. **Drive: 11 plays, 84 yards, 6:10.**

**Fourth quarter**

- MIA – Mack Hollins 11-yard pass from Tua Tagovailoa (Jason Sanders kick), 11:19. Tied 31–31. **Drive: 10 plays, 93 yards, 6:09.**
- MIA – Jason Sanders 50-yard field goal, 3:35. Dolphins 34–31. **Drive: 5 plays, 28 yards, 1:40.**

**Top passers**

- MIA – Tua Tagovailoa – 20/28, 248 yards, 2 TD
- ARI – Kyler Murray – 21/26, 283 yards, 3 TD

**Top rushers**

- MIA – Salvon Ahmed – 7 rushes, 38 yards
- ARI – Kyler Murray – 11 rushes, 106 yards, TD

**Top receivers**

- MIA – DeVante Parker – 6 receptions, 64 yards
- ARI – Christian Kirk – 5 receptions, 123 yards, TD

In a back-and-forth game, Miami pulled ahead late in the game with 10 points in the fourth quarter, taking the lead with a 50-yard field goal from Jason Sanders after the two-minute warning. Kyler Murray drove the Cardinals into field goal range in the final seconds, but kicker Zane Gonzalez missed the potential game-tying field goal short, sealing a 34–31 Miami victory. With the win, the Dolphins not only improved to 5–3 for the first time since 2014, but also earned their first 4-game winning streak since 2016 and a win in Phoenix for the first time since 1996.

==== Week 10: vs. Los Angeles Chargers ====
Week Ten: Los Angeles Chargers at Miami Dolphins – Game summary

Quarter	1	2	3	4	Total
Chargers	0	7	7	7	**21**
**Dolphins**	14	3	3	9	**29**

at Hard Rock Stadium, Miami Gardens, Florida

- Date: November 15
- Game time: 4:05 p.m. EST
- Game weather: Partly cloudy, 83 °F (28 °C)
- Game attendance: 12,751
- Referee: Jerome Boger
- TV announcers (CBS): Greg Gumbel, Rich Gannon and AJ Ross
- Recap, Game Book

Game information

**First quarter**

- MIA – Salvon Ahmed 1-yard run (Jason Sanders kick), 12:58. Dolphins 7–0. **Drive: 1 play, 1 yard, 0:04.**
- MIA – Jakeem Grant 3-yard pass from Tua Tagovailoa (Jason Sanders kick), 1:01. Dolphins 14–0. **Drive: 13 plays, 88 yards, 7:04.**

**Second quarter**

- LAC – Justin Herbert 1-yard run (Michael Badgley kick), 4:25. Dolphins 14–7. **Drive: 11 plays, 37 yards, 5:51.**
- MIA – Jason Sanders 50-yard field goal, 0:29. Dolphins 17–7. **Drive: 5 plays, 15 yards, 0:37.**

**Third quarter**

- LAC – Hunter Henry 2-yard pass from Justin Herbert (Michael Badgley kick), 7:02. Dolphins 17–14. **Drive: 11 plays, 68 yards, 6:38.**
- MIA – Jason Sanders 35-yard field goal, 2:34. Dolphins 20–14. **Drive: 8 plays, 58 yards, 4:28.**

**Fourth quarter**

- MIA – Durham Smythe 2-yard pass from Tua Tagovailoa (pass failed), 11:38. Tied 26–14. **Drive: 5 plays, 32 yards, 2:32.**
- MIA – Jason Sanders 49-yard field goal, 4:06. Dolphins 29–14. **Drive: 7 plays, 14 yards, 2:38.**
- LAC – Keenan Allen 13-yard pass from Justin Hebert (Michael Badgley kick), 1:57. Dolphins 29–21. **Drive: 8 plays, 69 yards, 2:02.**

**Top passers**

- LAC – Justin Herbert – 20/32, 187 yards, 2 TD, INT
- MIA – Tua Tagovailoa – 15/25, 169 yards, 2 TD

**Top rushers**

- LAC – Kalen Ballage – 18 rushes, 68 yards
- MIA – Salvon Ahmed – 21 rushes, 85 yards, TD

**Top receivers**

- LAC – Keenan Allen – 3 receptions, 39 yards, TD
- MIA – Jakeem Grant – 4 receptions, 43 yards, TD

In a compelling battle between rookie quarterbacks, Miami's Tua Tagovailoa (2020 draft #5 overall) was the victor over Justin Herbert (2020 draft #6 overall). Miami quickly leapt to a 14-0 advantage forcing Herbert & company into struggling after the Dolphins for the entire game. Despite throwing two touchdowns, Herbert also tossed an interception forced by a Miami defense that hounded him all day. Tagovailoa threw for two scores and zero interceptions which culminated in his third-straight victory as a rookie QB. By defeating the Chargers, the Fins have won five straight games. The Dolphins began the season 6–3 for the first time since 2001. Tua Tagovailoa also became the 5th rookie quarterback since the 1970 AFL-NFL merger to begin 3–0, after Ben Roethlisberger, Mark Sanchez, Carson Wentz, and Lamar Jackson.

==== Week 11: at Denver Broncos ====
Week Eleven: Miami Dolphins at Denver Broncos – Game summary

Quarter	1	2	3	4	Total
Dolphins	7	3	0	3	**13**
**Broncos**	7	6	7	0	**20**

at Empower Field at Mile High, Denver, Colorado

- Date: November 22
- Game time: 4:05 p.m. EST/2:05 p.m. MST
- Game weather: Mostly sunny, 45 °F (7 °C)
- Game attendance: 5,351
- Referee: Land Clark
- TV announcers (CBS): Kevin Harlan, Trent Green and Melanie Collins
- Recap, Game Book

Game information

**First quarter**

- MIA – DeVante Parker 3-yard pass from Tua Tagovailoa (Jason Sanders kick), 10:08. Dolphins 7–0. **Drive: 5 plays, 22 yards, 2:50.**
- DEN – Melvin Gordon 1-yard run (Brandon McManus kick), 1:34. Tied 7–7. **Drive: 11 plays, 73 yards, 6:00.**

**Second quarter**

- DEN – Brandon McManus 29-yard field goal, 9:55. Broncos 10–7. **Drive: 5 plays, 48 yards, 1:54.**
- MIA – Jason Sanders 41-yard field goal, 2:39. Tied 10–10. **Drive: 14 plays, 52 yards, 7:16.**
- DEN – Brandon McManus 47-yard field goal, 0:00. Broncos 13–10. **Drive: 9 plays, 60 yards, 2:34.**

**Third quarter**

- DEN – Melvin Gordon 20-yard run (Brandon McManus kick), 2:31. Broncos 20–10. **Drive: 9 plays, 84 yard, 4:46.**

**Fourth quarter**

- MIA – Jason Sanders 53-yard field goal, 7:51. Broncos 20–13. **Drive: 7 plays, 44 yards, 2:04.**

**Top passers**

- MIA – Ryan Fitzpatrick – 12/18, 117 yards, INT
- DEN – Drew Lock – 18/30, 270 yards, INT

**Top rushers**

- MIA – Salvon Ahmed – 12 rushes, 43 yards
- DEN – Melvin Gordon – 15 rushes, 84 yards, 2 TD

**Top receivers**

- MIA – DeVante Parker – 6 receptions, 61 yards, TD
- DEN – Tim Patrick – 5 receptions, 119 yards

The Dolphins played without running back Jordan Howard as he got cut on November 16, 2020, after just nine games with the Dolphins. In the fourth quarter, Tua was replaced by Fitzpatrick after Tua got hurt. Fitzpatrick attempted a comeback but threw an interception in the red-zone ending any chances of a comeback and dropping the Dolphins 6–4. Not only did the Dolphins fail to win in Denver for the first time since 2008, but Tua failed to join Ben Roethlisberger as the only rookie quarterbacks to begin 4–0.

==== Week 12: at New York Jets ====
Week Twelve: Miami Dolphins at New York Jets – Game summary

Quarter	1	2	3	4	Total
**Dolphins**	3	10	0	7	**20**
Jets	3	0	0	0	**3**

at MetLife Stadium, East Rutherford, New Jersey

- Date: November 29
- Game time: 1:00 p.m. EST
- Game weather: Sunny, 54 °F (12 °C)
- Game attendance: 0
- Referee: Adrian Hill
- TV announcers (CBS): Andrew Catalon, James Lofton and AJ Ross
- Recap, Game Book

Game information

**First quarter**

- NYJ – Sergio Castillo 38-yard field goal, 9:48. Jets 3–0. **Drive: 9 plays, 55 yards, 5:15.**
- MIA – Jason Sanders 54-yard field goal, 1:17. Tied 3–3. **Drive: 7 plays, 35 yards, 2:18.**

**Second quarter**

- MIA – Mike Gesicki 13-yard pass from Ryan Fitzpatrick (Jason Sanders kick), 8:56. Dolphins 10–3. **Drive: 10 plays, 88 yards, 5:11.**
- MIA – Jason Sanders 51-yard field goal, 5:57. Dolphins 13–3. **Drive: 6 plays, 36 yards, 2:30.**

**Third quarter**

- No scoring plays.

**Fourth quarter**

- MIA – Adam Shaheen 7-yard pass from Ryan Fitzpatrick (Jason Sanders kick), 6:54. Dolphins 20–3. **Drive: 7 plays, 80 yards, 3:39.**

**Top passers**

- MIA – Ryan Fitzpatrick – 24/39, 257 yards, 2 TD
- NYJ – Sam Darnold – 16/27, 197 yards, 2 INT

**Top rushers**

- MIA – DeAndre Washington – 13 rushes, 49 yards
- NYJ – Frank Gore – 18 rushes, 74 yards

**Top receivers**

- MIA – DeVante Parker – 8 receptions, 119 yards
- DEN – Breshad Perriman – 4 receptions, 79 yards

Veteran quarterback Ryan Fitzpatrick made his first start since Week 6, as rookie Tua Tagovailoa was ruled out after suffering a minor injury during practices. Wide receiver DeVante Parker became the 9th player in franchise history to reach 4,000 career receiving yards, and the Dolphins swept the Jets for the first time in two seasons. This was also Fitzpatrick's final full game of his career, as he retired from the NFL 2 years later on June 2, 2022. With the win, the Dolphins improved to 7–4.

==== Week 13: vs. Cincinnati Bengals ====
Week Thirteen: Cincinnati Bengals at Miami Dolphins – Game summary

Quarter	1	2	3	4	Total
Bengals	7	0	0	0	**7**
**Dolphins**	0	6	10	3	**19**

at Hard Rock Stadium, Miami Gardens, Florida

- Date: December 6
- Game time: 1:00 p.m. EST
- Game weather: Mostly cloudy, 81 °F (27 °C)
- Game attendance: 12,577
- Referee: Ronald Torbert
- TV announcers (CBS): Andrew Catalon, James Lofton and AJ Ross
- Recap, Game Book

Game information

**First quarter**

- CIN – Tyler Boyd 72-yard pass from Brandon Allen (Randy Bullock kick), 3:31. Bengals 7–0. **Drive: 3 plays, 80 yards, 1:20.**

**Second quarter**

- MIA – Jason Sanders 25-yard field goal, 11:35. Bengals 7–3. **Drive: 10 plays, 68 yards, 6:38.**
- MIA – Jason Sanders 48-yard field goal, 0:02. Bengals 7–6. **Drive: 6 plays, 27 yards, 0:58.**

**Third quarter**

- MIA – Mike Gesicki 5-yard pass from Tua Tagovailoa (Jason Sanders kick), 11:35. Dolphins 13–7. **Drive: 8 plays, 75 yards, 3:25.**
- MIA – Jason Sanders 23-yard field goal, 5:37. Dolphins 16–7. **Drive: 10 plays, 70 yards, 4:10.**

**Fourth quarter**

- MIA – Jason Sanders 19-yard field goal, 13:24. Bengals 19–7. **Drive: 12 plays, 46 yards, 5:31.**

**Top passers**

- CIN – Brandon Allen – 11/19, 153 yards, TD, INT
- MIA – Tua Tagovailoa – 26/39, 296 yards, TD

**Top rushers**

- CIN – Giovani Bernard – 12 rushes, 30 yards
- MIA – Myles Gaskin – 21 rushes, 90 yards

**Top receivers**

- CIN – Tyler Boyd – 1 reception, 72 yards, TD
- MIA – Mike Gesicki – 9 receptions, 88 yards, TD

For the first time since suffering a minor thumb injury, Tua Tagovailoa returned as the Dolphins' starting quarterback. The Bengals jumped out to an early lead of 7-0, but were unable to add to that score for the rest of the contest. Officials were kept busy maintaining order in this game that came to blows between players and culminated in entire teams storming the field to face off with one another. After players were finished trading blows and referees were finished ejecting five of them from the contest, Brian Flores’ Miami Dolphins emerged victorious in arguably the best performance, thus far, of Tua Tagovailoa's nascent career by going 26 of 39 for 296 passing yards, one TD and no interceptions. The Fins continued their domination of other teams by allowing only seven points maintaining a hold on second overall in the NFL in scoring defense. The Dolphins began 8–4 for the first time since 2003 and also clinched a non-losing season for the first time since 2016.

==== Week 14: vs. Kansas City Chiefs ====
Week Fourteen: Kansas City Chiefs at Miami Dolphins – Game summary

Quarter	1	2	3	4	Total
**Chiefs**	0	14	16	3	**33**
Dolphins	7	3	0	17	**27**

at Hard Rock Stadium, Miami Gardens, Florida

- Date: December 13
- Game time: 1:00 p.m. EST
- Game weather: Sunny, 81 °F (27 °C)
- Game attendance: 13,057
- Referee: Clay Martin
- TV announcers (CBS): Jim Nantz, Tony Romo and Tracy Wolfson
- Recap, Game Book

Game information

**First quarter**

- MIA – Mike Gesicki 7-yard pass from Tua Tagovailoa (Jason Sanders kick), 1:35. Dolphins 7–0. **Drive: 7 plays, 44 yards, 3:15.**

**Second quarter**

- MIA – Jason Sanders 31-yard field goal, 10:14. Dolphins 10–0. **Drive: 10 plays, 34 yards, 5:23.**
- KC – Tyreek Hill 32-yard run (Harrison Butker kick), 8:10. Dolphins 10–7. **Drive: 4 plays, 75 yards, 2:04.**
- KC – Travis Kelce 6-yard pass from Patrick Mahomes (Harrison Butker kick), 0:37. Chiefs 14–10. **Drive: 9 plays, 74 yards, 2:15.**

**Third quarter**

- KC – Tyreek Hill 44-yard pass from Patrick Mahomes (Harrison Butker kick), 13:50. Chiefs 21–10. **Drive: 3 plays, 75 yards, 1:10.**
- KC – Mecole Hardman 67-yard punt return (Harrison Butker kick), 12:38. Chiefs 28–10.
- KC – Chris Jones sacks Tua Tagovailoa in endzone for safety, 6:52. Chiefs 30–10.

**Fourth quarter**

- MIA – Mike Gesicki 29-yard pass from Tua Tagovailoa (Jason Sanders kick), 12:03. Chiefs 30–17. **Drive: 6 plays, 80 yards, 2:16.**
- MIA – Tua Tagovailoa 1-yard run (Jason Sanders kick), 4:15. Chiefs 30–24. **Drive: 14 plays, 75 yards, 5:52.**
- KC – Harrison Butker 46-yard field goal, 1:08. Chiefs 33–24. **Drive: 10 plays, 47 yards, 3:07.**
- MIA – Jason Sanders 44-yard field goal, 0:16. Chiefs 33–27. **Drive: 5 plays, 49 yards, 0:52.**

**Top passers**

- KC – Patrick Mahomes – 24/34, 393 yards, 2 TD, 3 INT
- MIA – Tua Tagovailoa – 28/48, 316 yards, 2 TD, INT

**Top rushers**

- KC – Tyreek Hill – 1 rush, 32 yards, TD
- MIA – DeAndre Washington – 13 rushes, 35 yards

**Top receivers**

- KC – Travis Kelce – 8 receptions, 136 yards, TD
- MIA – Lynn Bowden – 7 receptions, 82 yards

Despite holding a 10–0 lead during the first quarter and attempting a comeback down 30–10 in the 4th quarter, the Dolphins not only failed to beat the Chiefs for the first time since 2011, but they also failed to beat them at home for the first time since 2006, and to beat an Andy Reid-coached team for the first time since 1999, which was Reid's first year coaching the Philadelphia Eagles. With the loss, the Dolphins fell to 8–5.

==== Week 15: vs. New England Patriots ====
Week Fifteen: New England Patriots at Miami Dolphins – Game summary

Quarter	1	2	3	4	Total
Patriots	0	6	3	3	**12**
**Dolphins**	0	0	7	15	**22**

at Hard Rock Stadium, Miami Gardens, Florida

- Date: December 20
- Game time: 1:00 p.m. EST
- Game weather: Mostly cloudy, 79 °F (26 °C)
- Game attendance: 13,354
- Referee: Brad Allen
- TV announcers (CBS): Ian Eagle, Charles Davis and Evan Washburn
- Recap, Game Book

Game information

**First quarter**

- No scoring plays.

**Second quarter**

- NE – Nick Folk 45-yard field goal, 8:55. Patriots 3–0. **Drive: 13 plays, 69 yards, 6:10.**
- NE – Nick Folk 36-yard field goal, 4:19. Patriots 6–0. **Drive: 8 plays, 42 yards, 2:32.**

**Third quarter**

- MIA – Salvon Ahmed 1-yard run (Jason Sanders kick), 10:32. Dolphins 7–6. **Drive: 9 plays, 72 yards, 4:28.**
- NE – Nick Folk 45-yard field goal, 4:23. Patriots 9–7. **Drive: 8 plays, 65 yards, 3:16.**

**Fourth quarter**

- MIA – Tua Tagovailoa 3-yard run (Tua Tagovailoa–Salvon Ahmed pass), 12:55. Dolphins 15–7. **Drive: 14 plays, 90 yards, 6:25.**
- NE – Nick Folk 42-yard field goal, 9:07. Dolphins 15–12. **Drive: 9 plays, 51 yards, 3:52.**
- MIA – Tua Tagovailoa 1-yard run (Jason Sanders kick), 3:17. Dolphins 22–12. **Drive: 11 plays, 75 yards, 5:46.**

**Top passers**

- NE – Cam Newton – 17/27, 209 yards
- MIA – Tua Tagovailoa – 20/26, 145 yards, INT

**Top rushers**

- NE – Sony Michel – 10 rushes, 74 yards
- MIA – Salvon Ahmed – 23 rushes, 122 yards, TD

**Top receivers**

- NE – Jakobi Meyers – 7 receptions, 111 yards
- MIA – Durham Smythe – 5 receptions, 40 yards

Not only did the Dolphins clinch their first winning season since 2016, but they defeated the Patriots at home for the first time since the Miracle in Miami, and defeated a Cam Newton-led team for the first time in franchise history. The Dolphins also eliminated the Patriots from postseason contention for the first time since 2008, and ensured their first non-winning season since 2000. Quarterback Tua Tagovailoa became the 6th rookie quarterback to defeat Bill Belichick's Patriots, after Ben Roethlisberger, Mark Sanchez, Colt McCoy, Russell Wilson, and Geno Smith. Backup quarterback Ryan Fitzpatrick also finished with a winning record in his career for the first time since 2015, when he played for the New York Jets, and for only the second time in his 15-year career. With the win, the Dolphins improved to 9–5.

==== Week 16: at Las Vegas Raiders ====
Week Sixteen: Miami Dolphins at Las Vegas Raiders – Game summary

Quarter	1	2	3	4	Total
**Dolphins**	3	3	7	13	**26**
Raiders	7	6	3	9	**25**

at Allegiant Stadium, Paradise, Nevada

- Date: December 26
- Game time: 8:15 p.m. EST/5:15 p.m. PST
- Game weather: None (indoor stadium)
- Game attendance: 0
- Referee: Tony Corrente
- TV announcers (NFLN): Joe Davis, Kurt Warner and Melissa Stark
- Recap, Game Book

Game information

**First quarter**

- LV – Derek Carr 1-yard run (Daniel Carlson kick), 8:25. Raiders 7–0. **Drive: 7 plays, 43 yards, 2:56.**
- MIA – Jason Sanders 37-yard field goal, 1:28. Raiders 7–3. **Drive: 12 plays, 56 yards, 6:57.**

**Second quarter**

- LV – Daniel Carlson 23-yard field goal, 6:51. Raiders 10–3. **Drive: 12 plays, 57 yards, 4:26.**
- MIA – Jason Sanders 39-yard field goal, 1:47. Raiders 10–6. **Drive: 11 plays, 54 yards, 5:04.**
- LV – Daniel Carlson 38-yard field goal, 0:16. Raiders 13–6. **Drive: 8 plays, 55 yards, 1:26.**

**Third quarter**

- MIA – Myles Gaskin 10-yard pass from Tua Tagovailoa (Jason Sanders kick), 10:38. Tied 13–13. **Drive: 9 plays, 75 yards, 4:29.**
- LV – Daniel Carlson 20-yard field goal, 2:34. Raiders 16–13. **Drive: 8 plays, 80 yards, 4:17.**

**Fourth quarter**

- MIA – Jason Sanders 22-yard field goal, 4:05. Tied 16–16. **Drive: 13 plays, 84 yards, 5:46.**
- LV – Nelson Agholor 85-yard pass from Derek Carr (kick failed), 3:37. Raiders 22–16. **Drive: 1 play, 75 yards, 0:24.**
- MIA – Myles Gaskin 59-yard pass from Ryan Fitzpatrick (Jason Sanders kick), 2:55. Dolphins 23–22. **Drive: 3 plays, 75 yards, 0:42.**
- LV – Daniel Carlson 22-yard field goal, 0:23. Raiders 25–23. **Drive: 7 plays, 71 yards, 2:32.**
- MIA – Jason Sanders 44-yard field goal, 0:06. Dolphins 26–25. **Drive: 3 plays, 49 yards, 0:13.**

**Top passers**

- MIA – Ryan Fitzpatrick – 9/13, 182 yards, TD
- LV – Derek Carr – 21/34, 336 yards, TD

**Top rushers**

- MIA – Myles Gaskin – 14 rush, 87 yards
- LV – Josh Jacobs – 13 rushes, 69 yards

**Top receivers**

- MIA – Myles Gaskin – 5 receptions, 82 yards, 2 TD
- LV – Nelson Agholor – 5 receptions, 155 yards, TD

Despite not holding a lead for much of the game and not scoring a touchdown in the first half, the Dolphins defeated the Raiders in a last-minute field goal made by Jason Sanders. Backup quarterback Ryan Fitzpatrick relieved a struggling Tua Tagovailoa in the 4th quarter and threw to Myles Gaskin for a touchdown to hand the Dolphins their first lead of the game, 23–22. After the Raiders retook the lead with only 23 seconds left in the fourth quarter, Fitzpatrick threw a no-look pass to Mack Hollins while his facemask was being tugged by a defender, a pass which Kansas City Chiefs' quarterback Patrick Mahomes dubbed "the greatest no-look pass of all time", to set up Sanders' game-winning field goal. This would also be Fitzpatrick's last appearance as a Dolphin, as he tested positive for COVID-19 5 days later, which caused him to miss the season finale versus the Buffalo Bills, and would sign with the Washington Football Team as a free agent on March 15, 2021, the 9th team he has played for in 16 years. With the win, the Dolphins improved to 10–5.

==== Week 17: at Buffalo Bills ====
Week Seventeen: Miami Dolphins at Buffalo Bills – Game summary

Quarter	1	2	3	4	Total
Dolphins	3	3	7	13	**26**
**Bills**	0	28	7	21	**56**

at Bills Stadium, Orchard Park, New York

- Date: January 3, 2021
- Game time: 1:00 p.m. EST
- Game weather: Cloudy, 35 °F (2 °C)
- Game attendance: 0
- Referee: Bill Vinovich
- TV announcers (CBS): Kevin Harlan, Trent Green and AJ Ross
- Recap, Game Book

Game information

**First quarter**

- MIA – Jason Sanders 49-yard field goal, 8:07. Dolphins 3–0. **Drive: 6 plays, 10 yards, 2:35.**

**Second quarter**

- BUF – Isaiah McKenzie 7-yard pass from Josh Allen (Tyler Bass kick), 12:09. Bills 7–3. **Drive: 7 plays, 50 yards, 3:19.**
- BUF – Isaiah McKenzie 14-yard pass from Josh Allen (Tyler Bass kick), 6:56. Bills 14–3. **Drive: 8 plays, 88 yards, 2:47.**
- BUF – Isaiah McKenzie 84-yard punt return (Tyler Bass kick), 5:22. Bills 21–3.
- MIA – Jason Sanders 32-yard field goal, 1:44. Bills 21–6. **Drive: 9 plays, 61 yards, 3:38.**
- BUF – John Brown 32-yard pass from Josh Allen (Tyler Bass kick), 1:00. Bills 28–6. **Drive: 4 plays, 75 yards, 0:44.**

**Third quarter**

- MIA – Myles Gaskin 1-yard run (Jason Sanders kick), 11:08. Bills 28–13. **Drive: 9 plays, 75 yards, 3:52.**
- BUF – Josh Norman 16-yard interception return (Tyler Bass kick), 8:20. Bills 35–13.

**Fourth quarter**

- BUF – Antonio Williams 18-yard run (Tyler Bass kick), 13:44. Bills 42–13. **Drive: 5 plays, 79 yards, 2:45.**
- BUF – Antonio Williams 2-yard run (Tyler Bass kick), 11:55. Bills 49–13. **Drive: 3 plays, 25 yards, 1:37.**
- MIA – Salvon Ahmed 16-yard run (pass failed), 8:40. Bills 49–19. **Drive: 9 plays, 75 yards, 3:15.**
- BUF – Gabe Davis 56-yard pass from Matt Barkley (Tyler Bass kick), 6:18. Bills 56–19. **Drive: 1 play, 56 yards, 0:09.**
- MIA – Malcolm Perry 25-yard pass from Tua Tagovailoa (Jason Sanders kick), 2:47. Bills 56–26. **Drive: 8 plays, 75 yards, 3:31.**

**Top passers**

- MIA – Tua Tagovailoa – 35/58, 361 yards, TD, 3 INT
- BUF – Josh Allen – 18/25, 224 yards, 3 TD, INT

**Top rushers**

- MIA – Salvon Ahmed – 6 rushes, 29 yards, TD
- BUF – Antonio Williams – 12 rushes, 63 yards, 2 TD

**Top receivers**

- MIA – DeVante Parker – 7 receptions, 116 yards
- BUF – Gabe Davis – 2 receptions, 107 yards, TD

After the blowout loss, the Dolphins failed to win 11 games in a season for the 12th consecutive year, when the 2008 Miami Dolphins won 11 games. The Dolphins were eliminated from playoff contention with wins by the Indianapolis Colts, Cleveland Browns, and Baltimore Ravens the same day. The Dolphins had also failed to become the first team since the 1999 Washington Redskins to clinch both a playoff berth and a top-3 pick in the upcoming draft, which is the first-round pick they acquired from trading Laremy Tunsil and Kenny Stills to the Houston Texans the season prior. With the loss, the Dolphins finished the 2020 season at 10–6.

=== Standings ===
==== Division ====
AFC East
	W	L	T	PCT	DIV	CONF	PF	PA	STK
^{(2)} Buffalo Bills	13	3	0	.813	6–0	10–2	501	375	W6
Miami Dolphins	10	6	0	.625	3–3	7–5	404	338	L1
New England Patriots	7	9	0	.438	3–3	6–6	326	353	W1
New York Jets	2	14	0	.125	0–6	1–11	243	457	L1

==== Conference ====
AFC
#	Team	Division	W	L	T	PCT	DIV	CONF	SOS	SOV	STK
**Division leaders**
1	Kansas City Chiefs	West	14	2	0	.875	4–2	10–2	.465	.464	L1
2	Buffalo Bills	East	13	3	0	.813	6–0	10–2	.512	.471	W6
3	Pittsburgh Steelers	North	12	4	0	.750	4–2	9–3	.475	.448	L1
4 (Note: Tennessee finished ahead of Indianapolis in the AFC South based on division record.)	Tennessee Titans	South	11	5	0	.688	5–1	8–4	.475	.398	W1
**Wild cards**
5 (Note: Baltimore claimed the No. 5 seed over Indianapolis based on head-to-head victory. Division tiebreaker used to eliminate Cleveland (see below).) (Note: Baltimore claimed the No. 5 seed over Cleveland based on head-to-head sweep.)	Baltimore Ravens	North	11	5	0	.688	4–2	7–5	.494	.401	W5
6 (Note: Cleveland claimed the No. 6 seed over Indianapolis based on head-to-head victory.)	Cleveland Browns	North	11	5	0	.688	3–3	7–5	.451	.406	W1
7	Indianapolis Colts	South	11	5	0	.688	4–2	7–5	.443	.384	W1
**Did not qualify for the postseason**
8	Miami Dolphins	East	10	6	0	.625	3–3	7–5	.467	.347	L1
9	Las Vegas Raiders	West	8	8	0	.500	4–2	6–6	.539	.477	W1
10 (Note: New England finished ahead of the LA Chargers based on head-to-head victory.)	New England Patriots	East	7	9	0	.438	3–3	6–6	.527	.429	W1
11	Los Angeles Chargers	West	7	9	0	.438	3–3	6–6	.482	.344	W4
12	Denver Broncos	West	5	11	0	.313	1–5	4–8	.566	.388	L3
13	Cincinnati Bengals	North	4	11	1	.281	1–5	4–8	.529	.438	L1
14	Houston Texans	South	4	12	0	.250	2–4	3–9	.541	.219	L5
15	New York Jets	East	2	14	0	.125	0–6	1–11	.594	.656	L1
16	Jacksonville Jaguars	South	1	15	0	.063	1–5	1–11	.549	.688	L15
**Tiebreakers** (Note: When breaking ties for three or more teams under the NFL's rules, they are first broken within divisions, then comparing only the highest ranked remaining team from each division.)
