= Gaskins, Isle of Wight =

Hamlet on the Isle of Wight

Coordinates: 50.694°N 1.124°W

Gaskins is a hamlet on the Isle of Wight in England UK. It is on the B3330 (Carpenters Road), approximately 1 mile (1.6 km) West of St Helens, and approximately 2 miles (3.2 km) Northeast of Brading.

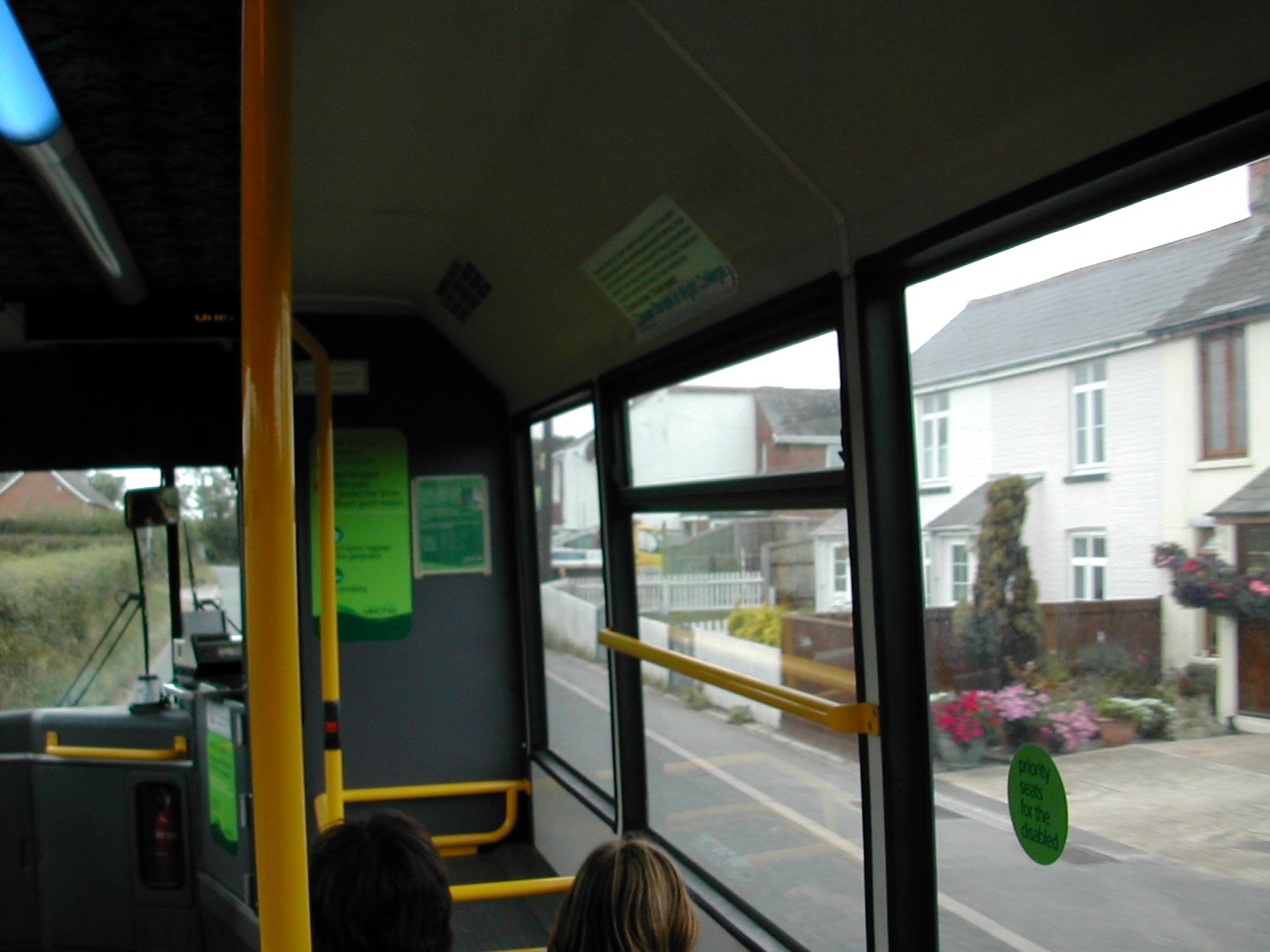
The centre of Gaskins as seen from a bus. Gaskins is no longer served by bus.
