= Myles Gaskin =

American football player (born 1997)

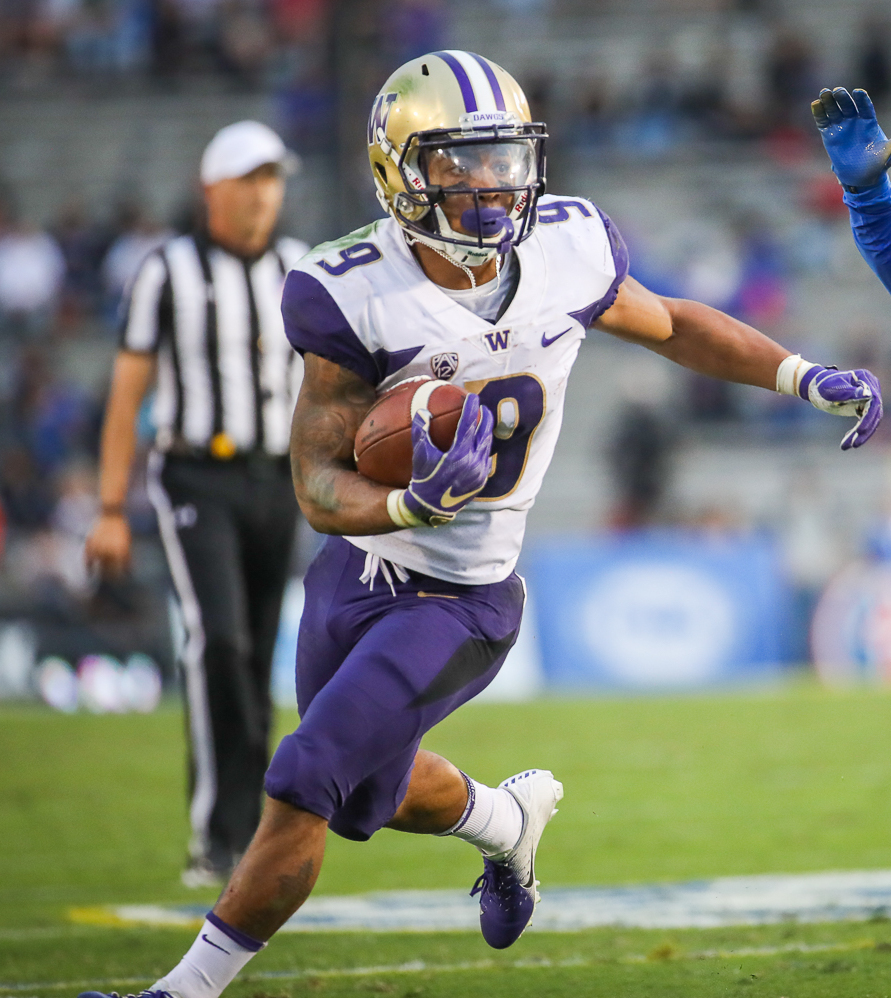
- Gaskin with the Washington Huskies in 2018

No. 37, 3, 33
- Position: Running back

Personal information
- Born: February 15, 1997 (age 29); Lynnwood, Washington, U.S.
- Listed height: 5 ft 10 in (1.78 m)
- Listed weight: 200 lb (91 kg)

Career information
- High school: O'Dea (Seattle, Washington)
- College: Washington (2015–2018)
- NFL draft: 2019: 7th round, 234th overall pick

Career history
- Miami Dolphins (2019–2022); Minnesota Vikings (2023); Los Angeles Rams (2023); Minnesota Vikings (2023–2024); Jacksonville Jaguars (2024)*; Baltimore Ravens (2025)*; Seattle Seahawks (2025)
- * Offseason or practice squad member only

Awards and highlights
- First-team All-Pac-12 (2016); 2× Second-team All-Pac-12 (2017, 2018)

Career NFL statistics
- Rushing yards: 1,360
- Rushing average: 3.7
- Rushing touchdowns: 7
- Receptions: 102
- Receiving yards: 712
- Receiving touchdowns: 6
- Stats at Pro Football Reference

Myles Gerard Gaskin (born February 15, 1997) is an American former professional football player who was a running back in the National Football League (NFL). He played college football for the Washington Huskies and was selected by the Miami Dolphins in the seventh round of the 2019 NFL draft.

== Early life ==
Gaskin was raised in Lynnwood, Washington, a suburb north of Seattle. He attended the Alderwood Boys and Girls Club where his athleticism playing basketball was noted by his coach.

Gaskin attended O'Dea High School in Seattle, Washington. As a junior, he rushed for 2,182 yards and 35 touchdowns and as a senior he had 1,567 yards and 25 touchdowns. Myles also ran track, competing in the 100 meter dash and the 4 by 100 meter relay. He committed to the University of Washington to play college football.

== College career ==
Gaskin became Washington's starting running back his true freshman year in 2015. He became the first true freshman in school history to rush for over 1,000 yards, finishing with 1,302 on 227 carries. He also set a freshman record with 14 rushing touchdowns. He was named the MVP of the 2015 Heart of Dallas Bowl after rushing for 181 yards and four touchdowns. Gaskin played in all 14 games of his sophomore season, amassing 1,373 yards and 10 touchdowns. He was named to the All-Pac-12 Conference first-team following the regular season.

In his statistically most-successful junior year, Gaskin led the Pac-12 with 21 rushing touchdowns and 24 total touchdowns, and was fifth in the conference in rushing yards. In the fourth game of the season at Colorado, he rushed for 202 yards, the only 200+ game of his career. His productivity declined slightly his senior year, but he still became the first Pac-12 player with four 1,000+ rushing-yard-seasons, and led the 2018 Huskies to conference championship and the Rose Bowl. There, in the last game of his college career, Gaskin rushed for two touchdowns and passed for a third in his only career pass attempt, all in the fourth quarter.

Gaskin finished his career at Washington with a school-record 62 touchdowns (2nd in Pac-12 history to Royce Freeman) and 5,323 rushing yards (3rd to Freeman and Charles White). He also holds school records for 100-rushing-yard games (26), rush attempts (945), rushing yards per game (102.4), rushing touchdowns (57), rushes of 50+ yards (10), and all-purpose yards (5,878).

== Professional career ==
Pre-draft measurables
Height	Weight	Arm length	Hand span	Wingspan	40-yard dash	10-yard split	20-yard split	20-yard shuttle	Three-cone drill	Vertical jump	Broad jump	Bench press
5 ft 9 1/4 in (1.76 m)	205 lb (93 kg)	29 1/2 in (0.75 m)	8 3/4 in (0.22 m)	5 ft 11 1/8 in (1.81 m)	4.56 s	1.58 s	2.64 s	4.27 s	7.19 s	35.5 in (0.90 m)	9 ft 10 in (3.00 m)	24 reps
All values from NFL Combine/Pro Day

=== Miami Dolphins ===
Gaskin was selected by the Miami Dolphins in the seventh round, 234th overall, of the 2019 NFL draft, the last of 25 running backs taken and the second by the Dolphins. In Week 16, in the 38–35 overtime victory over the Cincinnati Bengals, he scored his first career touchdown on a two-yard run. He was placed on injured reserve on December 24, 2019. He appeared in seven games as a rookie and recorded 133 rushing yards and one rushing touchdown to go along with seven receptions for 51 receiving yards.

In 2020, Gaskin started the season as backup to Matt Breida and Jordan Howard. In his first career start in Week 3, he had a career-best 95 yards from scrimmage in a victory over the Jacksonville Jaguars. In Week 6, Gaskin had 49 yards on the Dolphins' second series, en route to 126 yards from scrimmage in a 24–0 win over the New York Jets. He was placed on injured reserve on November 5, 2020, with a sprained MCL. He was activated on December 5, 2020. He was placed on the reserve/COVID-19 list by the team on December 12, 2020, and activated on December 23. In Week 16 against the Las Vegas Raiders, Gaskin rushed for 87 yards and recorded 5 catches for 82 yards and 2 touchdowns one being a 59-yard reception from Ryan Fitzpatrick during the 26–25 win.

Gaskin was the starter for most games in Miami's 2021 season, but carried 5 or fewer times in six of them. His 846 yards from scrimmage was second on the 9–8 team to Jaylen Waddle, but splitting carries with Duke Johnson the Dolphins struggled to an NFL-second-worst 3.5 yards per rush. Bright spots included 10 catches for 74 yards and 2 touchdowns in a Week 5 loss to the Tampa Bay Buccaneers, and 89 yards rushing with a receiving touchdown in a Week 15 win over the New York Jets. On December 27, 2022, Gaskin was placed on season–ending injured reserve.

On March 16, 2023, Gaskin signed a one-year contract extension with the Dolphins. On August 29, Gaskin was released by Miami.

=== Minnesota Vikings (first stint) ===
On August 30, 2023, Gaskin signed with the Minnesota Vikings. He was released on September 8, re-signed to the practice squad the next day and elevated to the active roster. Gaskin was signed back to the active roster on September 12, and appeared on special teams in their week 2 game against the Philadelphia Eagles. He was released on September 26, and re-signed to the practice squad the next day.

=== Los Angeles Rams ===
On October 17, 2023, Gaskin was signed off the Vikings practice squad to the Los Angeles Rams active roster. On October 29, he appeared on special teams during their Week 8 game against the Dallas Cowboys. Gaskin was waived by the Rams on November 7.

=== Minnesota Vikings (second stint) ===
On November 14, 2023, the Vikings re-signed Gaskin to their practice squad. On December 16, he appeared on special teams during their Week 15 game against the Cincinnati Bengals. He signed a reserve/futures contract with the Vikings on January 9, 2024. Gaskin had a total of 10 snaps played during the 2023 season, all on special teams, appearing in three games.

Gaskin was waived by the Vikings on August 27, 2024, and re-signed to the practice squad. On September 18, he was re-signed to the active roster. On December 3, Gaskin was released. On December 3, Gaskin was re-signed to the practice squad.

=== Jacksonville Jaguars ===
On December 10, 2024, the Jacksonville Jaguars signed Gaskin to their practice squad.

=== Baltimore Ravens ===
On August 10, 2025, Gaskin signed with the Baltimore Ravens. He was released on August 26, as part of final roster cuts.

=== Seattle Seahawks ===
On October 1, 2025, Gaskin signed with the Seattle Seahawks' practice squad. He was released on November 20, but subsequently re-signed on November 26. Gaskin was promoted to the active roster on November 29, but waived three days later and re-signed to the practice squad. He was released on December 13.

Gaskin announced his retirement from the NFL on August 19, 2026.

== NFL career statistics ==
Year	Team	Games		Rushing					Receiving				
Year	Team	GP	GS	Att	Yds	Avg	Lng	TD	Rec	Yds	Avg	Lng	TD
2019	MIA	7	0	36	133	3.7	27	1	7	51	7.3	20	0
2020	MIA	10	7	142	584	4.1	26	3	41	388	9.5	59	2
2021	MIA	17	10	173	612	3.5	30	3	49	234	4.8	24	4
2022	MIA	4	0	10	26	2.6	10	0	4	28	7	16	0
2023	MIN	2	0	0	0	0	0	0	0	0	0	0	0
2023	LAR	1	0	0	0	0	0	0	0	0	0	0	0
2025	SEA	1	0	3	6	2.0	3	0	0	0	0	0	0
Totals		39	17	361	1,361	3.8	30	7	101	701	6.9	59	6

== See also ==
- Washington Huskies football statistical leaders
