= Gaskins (surname) =

Gaskins is a surname, and may refer to:

- Alyia Gaskins, American public health professional, urban planner, and politician
- Donald Henry Gaskins (1933-1991), American cannibalistic serial killer, rapist, and thief
- Eric Gaskins (born 1958), American fashion designer
- Nettrice Gaskins (born 1970), American digital artist
- Peadar Gaskins, Irish football player
- Trevor Gaskins (born 1989), Panamaian basketball player
