= Gaskins, Arkansas =

Extinct town

Coordinates: 36°26′43″N 93°44′36″W

Gaskins is an extinct town in Carroll County, in the U.S. state of Arkansas.

The community site is located on Arkansas Route 23 about 2.5 miles north of Eureka Springs. The community was on Leatherwood Creek and the Gaskins Switch Cemetery is just north of the location.

The community once had a depot on the Eureka Springs Railway.
