= History of the Tampa Bay Buccaneers =

Sports team history

This article details the history of the Tampa Bay Buccaneers American football franchise.

== Origins ==
In 1971, National Football League Commissioner Pete Rozelle predicted that the 26-team league would expand to 32 teams within the 1970s decade. Rozelle confirmed on April 24, 1974, that an expansion was imminent. Rozelle revealed the five cities that were being considered to win an NFL franchise were Tampa-St. Petersburg, Memphis, Phoenix, Seattle and Honolulu. On October 30, 1974, the 26 franchise owners sold the 27th NFL franchise to Tampa Bay and Tom McCloskey, a Philadelphia builder, for $16 million. McCloskey had attempted to buy the Philadelphia Eagles in 1964 and again in 1969, but fell short by about $500,000 each time.

Ralph Wilson, owner of the Buffalo Bills franchise, courted interests in Tampa Bay who approached him about moving the Bills to Tampa Bay. Wilson was frustrated in his inability to gain a new stadium for his franchise. He considered Memphis, Tennessee and Seattle, Washington as possible sites in addition to Tampa Bay.

McCloskey quickly became dissatisfied with the financial arrangement with the NFL, and backed out of the deal a month later. Hugh Culverhouse, a tax attorney from Jacksonville who had failed in his bid to buy the Los Angeles Rams, received the Tampa franchise.

The new Tampa Bay franchise was named the “Buccaneers” or "Bucs," a reference to the pirates who frequented Florida's Gulf coast during the 17th century. The team's first home was Tampa Stadium, which had been expanded to seat 72,000 fans.

== Seasons 1976–1978 ==
The Buccaneers joined the NFL as members of the AFC West in 1976. They were moved to the NFC Central, while the other 1976 expansion team, the Seattle Seahawks, switched conferences with Tampa Bay and joined the AFC West. This realignment was dictated by the league as part of the 1976 expansion plan, so that both teams could play each other twice and every other NFL franchise once during their first two seasons.

USC coach John McKay was recruited as the team's first head coach after being offered a $3 million contract.

In the 1977 season, the Buccaneers were shut out six times. In Week 13, the Buccaneers won their first regular-season game, defeating the New Orleans Saints on the road 33–14. The win was highlighted by three interceptions returned for touchdowns, an NFL record at the time. The Buccaneers followed the victory with a win at home over the St. Louis Cardinals during the final week of the season.

== Seasons 1979–1982 ==
The Buccaneers began the 1979 season with five consecutive victories and the team featured on the cover of Sports Illustrated.

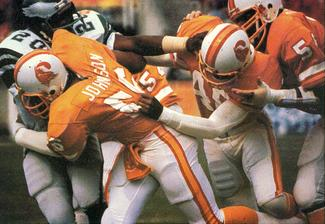
The Buccaneers defeated the Eagles in their first playoff appearance in 1979 after suffering three consecutive losing seasons.

The team won its final game against the Kansas City Chiefs to make the playoffs. Finishing with a 10–6 record, the Bucs had their first winning season, and won the Central Division in a tiebreaker over the Chicago Bears. The Bucs upset the Philadelphia Eagles 24–17 in the divisional round of the 1979 playoffs. The will allowed the Bucs to host NFC Championship Game in Tampa, where the team lost to the Rams 9–0.

In 1980, the Bucs had five wins, 10 losses, and a tie against the Green Bay Packers.

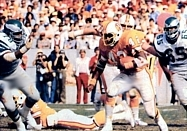
Bucs' running back Ricky Bell rushing the ball during the 1979 NFC Divisional Playoff Game.

The last game in the 1981 season was against the Detroit Lions. The winner would take the Central Division crown and the loser would miss the playoffs. The Lions had not lost at home all season. The Bucs trailed early, but an 84-yard touchdown pass from quarterback Doug Williams to wide receiver Kevin House, and a fumble recovery for a touchdown by David Logan sealed the win for the Bucs and a place in the 1981 playoffs. The Dallas Cowboys defeated the Bucs 38–0 in the divisional round.

Starting the 1982 season, the Bucs went 0–3 before a players strike shut down the NFL for seven weeks. When the league resumed play, the Bucs won five of its next six games and qualified for the expanded playoff slate. In the first round, the Bucs lost 30–17 to the Cowboys in Dallas.

== Seasons 1983–1996 ==
Doug Williams' salary of $120,000 made him the lowest-paid starting quarterback in the NFL in the 1982 season. At the end of the season, Williams asked for a raise to $600,000 per season. Culverhouse offered $400,000. Williams left the Bucs to play for the Oklahoma/Arizona Outlaws in the USFL.

Without Williams, the Bucs were a rudderless team. They started the 1983 season by losing its first nine games which knocked them out of playoff contention. They finished with a 2–14 record, the first of a league record 12 consecutive seasons with at least 10 losses.

In 1986, the Bucs had the first pick in the draft and chose Auburn athlete and 1985 Heisman Trophy winner Vincent Edward "Bo" Jackson However, Jackson had never forgiven Culverhouse for flying him to Tampa for a physical and a visit at the team's expense during his senior year at Auburn and led him to believe that the NCAA and Southeastern Conference had approved the trip. No approval had been sought or granted, and the trip cost Jackson his eligibility during his senior baseball season. Jackson believed the Bucs deliberately tried to sabotage his baseball career so he would pursue professional football and be available as a first-round draft pick for the Bucs, and vowed never to play for them if they picked him .

The front-office woes affected the team regardless of who was brought in to coach. McKay stepped down at the end of the 1984 season and was succeeded by Leeman Bennett, who had coached the Atlanta Falcons to their first-ever playoff win. After two disastrous 2–14 seasons, he was replaced by former New York Giants and University of Alabama head coach Ray Perkins. Perkins brought back much-needed discipline and “three-a-day” practices, but this proved too much of a good thing. The team was so physically drained by game day that the losses continued to pile up, and Perkins was fired before the end of the 1990 season. Offensive coordinator Richard Williamson became interim head coach, and had the "interim" tag removed following a promising finish to the 1990 season. The momentum didn't last, however, and Williamson was fired after the 1991 season when the team regressed to 3–13, their worst season since 1986.

Largely due to the Bucs’ wretched showings on the field, attendances were typically among the lowest in the league. Usually, the only times that games attracted crowds anywhere near capacity were when the Chicago Bears and Green Bay Packers came to town and brought thousands of their fans with them. Both teams had large followings in Tampa Bay due to the large number of Midwestern expatriates in the area. As a result, most Bucs home games were blacked out locally. At one point, 32 home games in a row from 1982 to 1986 – all or part of five seasons – were not televised locally.

It wasn't until the hiring of Sam Wyche that Bucs fans had reason for optimism. Wyche had coached the Cincinnati Bengals to a Super Bowl appearance, when Cincinnati might have won if not for a fourth quarter comeback engineered by 49ers QB Joe Montana. Wyche did not have immediate success in Tampa, and even his bold “five-dash-two” (indicating five wins and two losses) declaration in his final season with the Bucs proved premature. However, Wyche deserves credit for drafting three key players who would later prove to be the core of the team's renewed success on defense – Warren Sapp, Derrick Brooks and John Lynch.

Things only really began to change, however, after Culverhouse died of lung cancer in 1994.

== New ownership, Tony Dungy, and a return to contention (1996–2001) ==
Despite the profitability of the Buccaneers in the 1980s, Culverhouse's death revealed a team close to bankruptcy, which surprised many observers. His son, Miami attorney Hugh Culverhouse Jr., practically forced the trustees of his father's estate to sell the team, which cast doubt on the future of the Buccaneers in Tampa. Interested parties included New York Yankees owner George Steinbrenner and Baltimore Orioles owner Peter Angelos, the latter of whom publicly declared he would move the team to Baltimore, which had lacked an NFL franchise since the Colts were relocated to Indianapolis. There was also talk of moving the Buccaneers to nearby Orlando, but mayor Glenda Hood ruled out razing the Citrus Bowl to build an NFL stadium. After Art Modell moved the Cleveland Browns to Baltimore and Georgia Frontiere moved the Rams to St. Louis, rumours of relocation to the vacated markets of Los Angeles or Cleveland emerged, as did talk of moving to Hartford, Connecticut.

However, in a last-minute surprise, Malcolm Glazer outbid both Steinbrenner and Angelos for $192 million, the highest sale price for a professional sports franchise up to that point. Glazer immediately placed his sons Bryan, Edward, and Joel in charge of the team's financial affairs, and the family's deep pockets and serious commitment to fielding a winning team — in Tampa — allowed the Bucs to finally become competitive. The team's performance dramatically improved when the Glazers hired Minnesota Vikings defensive coordinator Tony Dungy as head coach, jettisoned the old “creamsicle” uniforms, and convinced Hillsborough County voters to raise sales taxes to partially fund the construction of Raymond James Stadium.

=== 1996 season: Dungy’s first year ===
During Dungy's first season in 1996, the team continued to struggle, starting the season 1–8. However, in the second half of the season they finished 5–2, primarily due to the performance of a defense ranked seventh in the NFL led by Hardy Nickerson and the maturing of Wyche's draftees Brooks, Lynch and Sapp. Dungy, widely renowned for his somber, even-tempered personality, quickly brought balance and morale to the team. Defensive coordinator Monte Kiffin developed and refined their trademark Tampa 2 defensive scheme, which became the foundation for Tampa Bay's future success, not to mention a blueprint copied by other teams in the NFL, including the Chicago Bears and the St. Louis Rams.

=== The 1997 season: Back to the playoffs ===
Everything finally came together in 1997. The team started the season 5–0, picking up where they left off the previous year, and this quick start once again landed them on the cover of Sports Illustrated—not once, but twice. The Bucs went 10–6 for their first winning season and playoff appearance since 1982, as a wild-card team. In the Bucs’ final home game at Houlihan's Stadium (formerly Tampa Stadium), the team defeated the Detroit Lions 20–10 for only the second playoff win in franchise history. They lost at Lambeau Field to the eventual NFC champion Green Bay Packers 21–7. Still, there was reason for optimism, and the expectations were high for the following season.

=== 1998–2001: “The New Sombrero” ===
The 1998 season, the first to be played in the newly constructed Raymond James Stadium, saw the Bucs lose several close games en route to a disappointing 8–8 record. The 1999 season saw much better fortunes. On the strength of the NFL's number one overall defense and a surprising performance by rookie QB Shaun King, the Bucs finished the season with an 11–5 record and won their third NFC Central championship. They edged the Washington Redskins 14–13 in the Divisional round, before losing to the eventual Super Bowl champion St. Louis Rams in an unusually low-scoring NFC Championship Game, 11–6. The Bucs’ loss was controversial, highlighted by the unusual reversal of a pass from King to WR Bert Emanuel. Despite the fact that Emanuel clearly controlled the ball at every point during the catch, booth replay official Jerry Markbreit ordered a review of the call. Referee Bill Carollo determined that the nose of the ball had touched the ground as he brought it into his body. The resulting reversal all but ended the Bucs' hopes of mounting a game-winning drive. In league meetings later that year, NFL later changed the rules regarding what constituted an incomplete pass, which was a backhanded admission that the reversal was incorrect.

=== Offensive woes ===
In spite of Dungy's success at coaching Tampa Bay into a winner, one of the consistent criticisms from the media and from fans—and later, from players including Warren Sapp—was that the defense was expected to shoulder too much of the responsibility for winning games. Beyond fullback Mike Alstott and running back Warrick Dunn—who served as a one-two punch ground attack—and wide receiver Keyshawn Johnson, the team was otherwise underwhelming on offense. Despite the ongoing criticism, Dungy remained staunchly loyal to his coaching staff, but at the conclusion of the 1999 season, general manager Rich McKay forced Dungy to fire offensive coordinator Mike Shula. He was replaced by former Minnesota Vikings and Tennessee Titans offensive coordinator Les Steckel in 2000, and the result was the Bucs' highest-scoring season ever, another 10–6 record, and another trip to the playoffs as a wild card. despite his transformation of the team's offense, Steckel's drill sergeant approach to coaching (he was a colonel in the Marines) was a poor fit for the franchise. He was fired at the end of the season, after the Bucs lost 21–3 to the Philadelphia Eagles.

Rather than choose from the pool of strong offensive coordinators available at the end of the 2000 campaign (including former Redskins coach Norv Turner), Dungy decided to elevate his receivers coach Clyde Christensen to the position. It can be argued that this controversial decision was the final nail in the coffin for Dungy's tenure. Although the team achieved a 9–7 winning record in 2001, they barely made it into the playoffs as the lowest-seeded wild card. To add insult to injury, the Bucs were once again blown out by the Eagles—this time, 31–9.

Frustrated with the team's inability to reach the Super Bowl despite a league-dominating defense, Malcolm Glazer fired Dungy the following day—a decision that created more controversy among devoted players and fans. Despite whatever weaknesses that may have been ascribed to him, Dungy was highly respected around the league as a man of solid character and a coach to whom players were fiercely loyal. Dungy went on to coach the Colts to the Super Bowl XLI championship against the Chicago Bears, in the process becoming the first African-American head coach to win the Super Bowl.

== Jon Gruden, the Super Bowl, and beyond (2002–2008) ==
Dungy was soon hired as the head coach of the Indianapolis Colts, while the Bucs mounted a prolonged and much-maligned search for his replacement. Several potential candidates were offered the job, including University of Florida head coach Steve Spurrier, Bill Parcells and Baltimore Ravens defensive coordinator Marvin Lewis. Spurrier jumped to the Redskins when he was offered the most lucrative salary package ever offered to an NFL head coach, and Parcells eventually passed on the Bucs’ offer—the second time he had done so in the history of the franchise. Bucs general manager Rich McKay threw his support behind Lewis, and his hiring appeared so certain that the Ravens held a going-away party for him. The Glazer brothers were so displeased with the selection of a yet another defensive-minded coach that they overruled McKay and took control of the candidate search themselves. They made it clear that their top choice was Jon Gruden. The problem was that he was still under contract to the Oakland Raiders.

While talks with the Raiders were secretly underway, the Glazers publicly pursued another respected offensive mind, San Francisco 49ers head coach Steve Mariucci. Just when initial reports indicated that Mariucci had agreed to become both the Bucs' head coach and general manager, Raiders owner Al Davis agreed to release Jon Gruden to Tampa Bay. Observers suggested that the Glazers' offer to Mariucci was merely a clever bargaining tactic: since Davis' large ego is well documented, it was very likely he wouldn't allow such a blockbuster trade to take place so near his turf. If the tactic didn't work, then the Bucs would still get the type of head coach the Glazers desired.

The Glazers’ shrewd move eventually paid off in acquiring Gruden, but it cost the team dearly. The team hired Gruden away from the Raiders on February 20, 2002, but the price was four draft picks, including the Bucs' first and second-round picks in 2002, their first-round pick in 2003, and their second round selection in 2004, along with $8 million in cash; the league as a result prohibited any further trading of draft picks for coaches. Gruden, who was frustrated by the limitation of his coaching authority by Davis, was more than pleased to return to Tampa Bay, as his parents lived nearby, and he had spent part of his childhood in Tampa in the early 1980s when his father had worked as a Bucs running back coach and director of player personnel.

=== The 2002 season: Super Bowl champions ===
Upon his arrival in Tampa, Gruden immediately went to work, acquiring former Jacksonville Jaguars wide receiver Keenan McCardell, and running back Michael Pittman from the Arizona Cardinals. The Bucs needed to improve their sluggish offense, as the league's sweeping realignment sent the Bucs to the new NFC South division, along with the Atlanta Falcons, Carolina Panthers and New Orleans Saints.

The offensive retooling was successful, and combined with the league's defense, the 2002 campaign was the Buccaneers' most successful season to date. They won the NFC South title with a 12–4 record—the team's best ever—then defeated the San Francisco 49ers in what became coach Steve Mariucci’s last game with that franchise. In a surprising upset, the Buccaneers won their first NFC Championship on the road against the Eagles in the last NFL game ever played at Veterans Stadium. Cornerback Ronde Barber capped off the win by intercepting a Donovan McNabb pass and returning it 92 yards for a touchdown late in the fourth quarter. Philadelphia fans could only watch in stunned silence.

The Buccaneers went on to rout Gruden’s former team, the Oakland Raiders, by a score of 48–21 in Super Bowl XXXVII. Gruden’s familiarity with the Raiders’ players and playbook paid off, as John Lynch and other Buccaneers players recognized some of Oakland's formations and plays at crucial points in the game. The Buccaneers became the first team to win the Super Bowl without any picks in the first two rounds of the previous spring's NFL draft, having traded these picks to the Oakland Raiders for the rights to acquire Gruden. Gruden became the youngest head coach to win a Super Bowl.

=== 2003 and 2004: Front-office tensions ===
Soon after the Super Bowl victory, a growing number of press reports indicated Gruden's lack of patience with general manager McKay. McKay was a major architect of the Buccaneers rebuilding effort over the previous ten years, and he, like Gruden, had long-established ties to the Tampa Bay area. However, during the 2003 season, the Gruden-McKay relationship deteriorated as the Buccaneers struggled on the field. In November, Keyshawn Johnson was deactivated by the team ten games into the season for his conduct, which included sideline arguments with Buccaneers coaches and players. Johnson was eventually traded to the Dallas Cowboys for wide receiver Joey Galloway.

Johnson's unusual deactivation was a definitive sign that Gruden had indeed gained control. In December, the Glazers allowed McKay to leave the Buccaneers before the end of the regular season, and he promptly joined the Falcons as president and general manager. Thus, McKay watched his first game as a Falcons executive sitting next to owner Arthur Blank in a Raymond James Stadium skybox. The Atlanta Falcons defeated the Buccaneers 30–28, another sign of how the season had spiraled downward. Despite opening the season with a Monday Night Football win over the Philadelphia Eagles in Philadelphia's new stadium, Lincoln Financial Field, the Buccaneers finished the season 7–9. Combined with the Oakland Raiders' dismal 4-12 performance, neither Super Bowl team reached the playoffs that year.

Before the 2004 training camp, personnel issues and the salary cap became primary concerns. Gruden successfully lobbied the Glazers to hire his former general manager from Oakland, Bruce Allen. After Allen's arrival in the Buccaneers' front office, the team announced that it would not re-sign two of their best defensive players—John Lynch and Warren Sapp—before the regular season even started. Both of their contracts were expiring, and younger players could fill their positions. Lynch was released after medical exams indicated ongoing injury problems. Many Buccaneers fans were stunned by the move, as Lynch was a very popular player whose aggressive, intelligent play earned him several Pro Bowl appearances. He was also well regarded for his philanthropic work in the Tampa Bay area. Lynch was quickly signed by the Denver Broncos, where he had consecutive injury-free Pro Bowl seasons. Sapp signed with the Oakland Raiders, where he played in a limited role in 2004, and sat out much of the 2005 season with injuries. Since wide receiver Keenan McCardell refused to play until he was given a better contract or traded, he was sent to the San Diego Chargers for draft compensation.

The distracted Buccaneers began the 2004 season with a 1–5 record, their worst start since Gruden arrived. The fading accuracy of kicker Martin Gramatica didn't help matters, as the team lost many close games en route to a 5–11 record, making the Buccaneers the first NFL team to follow up a Super Bowl championship with back-to-back losing seasons. The lone highlights of 2004 were the high-quality play of rookie wide receiver Michael Clayton and the return of Doug Williams, who joined the Buccaneers front office as a personnel executive.

=== The 2005 season: Another division crown ===
In the 2005 season, the Buccaneers returned to their winning ways. The Buccaneers selected Carnell “Cadillac” Williams in the first round of the 2005 draft, and the rookie would provide a running game the Buccaneers hadn't possessed since the days of James Wilder Sr. in the 1980s. Williams set the NFL record for most yards rushing in his first three games with 474, and was named as the AP's 2005 Offensive Rookie of the Year. His shoes and gloves from the third game of the season are now on display in the Pro Football Hall of Fame.

With their 2005 campaign marking the Buccaneers' 30th season in the NFL, the team won their first four games before entering a midseason slump hampered by a season-ending injury to starting quarterback Brian Griese during a win over the Miami Dolphins. Replacement starter Chris Simms struggled early as the Bucs lost games to the San Francisco 49ers and Carolina Panthers, but Simms came into his own when he led the team to a last-minute win over the Washington Redskins in a 36–35 thriller to break that slump. In a gutsy move, Gruden went for the win with a two-point conversion plunge by fullback Mike Alstott. A booth review of that play was inconclusive, and Redskins coach Joe Gibbs stated after the game his belief that Alstott had not scored.

The Bucs followed up with important wins over their NFC South division rivals, sweeping both the New Orleans Saints and Atlanta Falcons, as well as defeating the Panthers in a rare victory at Carolina. Even with a tough loss against the Chicago Bears and a humiliating shutout against the New England Patriots, the Buccaneers finished 11–5 and won the NFC South by virtue of a tie-breaker over the Panthers. The Buccaneers' 30th Anniversary season would end on a sour note, as they lost 17–10 at home to the Redskins in the wild-card round. A late Buccaneers touchdown could have tied the game, but the play was ruled incomplete when a booth review upheld the referee’s decision.

The Buccaneers sent three veteran players to the 2006 Pro Bowl, including cornerback Ronde Barber and punter Josh Bidwell. Outside linebacker Derrick Brooks was named the Pro Bowl MVP, with a 59-yard interception return for a touchdown.

=== 2006 ===
After winning their division in 2005, the Buccaneers suffered through an abysmal 2006 season. The season was plagued by injuries, with starters such as guard Dan Buenning, wide receiver Michael Clayton, running back Carnell Williams, defensive end Simeon Rice, cornerback Brian Kelly, and quarterback Chris Simms all being placed on injured reserve at some point in the season. The season also saw a lot of rookies starting for the Buccaneers, such as quarterback Bruce Gradkowski, tackle Jeremy Trueblood, and guard Davin Joseph. The league schedule was also unfriendly to the Buccaneers, scheduling them for 3 games (two of them away games) within 11 days of each other.

There was more to the lost season than just injuries however, as most of the players put on injured reserve had been done so after the team's 0–3 start, and offensive shutouts in the first two games in which no touchdowns were scored by the Buccaneers. The departure of several key defensive coaches and assistants didn't bode well with players, who complained to some in the media of not being able to hear coaches in team meetings.

Inconsistent and unorganized are how some players referred to one of the newcomers, who most players had a hard time making the transition from long-time favorites Rod Marinelli and others. Some believe the problems in 2006 were rooted in recent years mistakes, lack of salary cap room to bring in high impact free agents, lack of top 50 draft picks over the last 5 or 6 years due to trades, and maybe even a failure to properly assess talent resulting in a lack of contribution from second day draft picks in recent history.

The Buccaneers started off the season 0–3, with quarterback Chris Simms throwing only one touchdown against seven interceptions. In the third game of the season, a last-minute loss to the Carolina Panthers, Simms's spleen was ruptured, and he was placed on injured reserve for the rest of the season. After their bye week, the Buccaneers elected to start rookie quarterback Bruce Gradkowski, a 6th-round pick from Toledo.

Gradkowski started off performing decently. People who in hindsight claim the Buccaneers should have started the more experienced Tim Rattay forget the Buccaneers nearly upset the New Orleans Saints, and then went on to win two narrow victories: one, against the Cincinnati Bengals, winning on an overturned call resulting in a touchdown; and another against the Philadelphia Eagles, thanks to Matt Bryant’s 62-yard field goal. After these victories, though, Gradkowski’s performance declined. After a 17–3 loss to the New York Giants in heavy winds, the Buccaneers proceeded to lose five of their next six games, leading them to a record of 3–10 (0–6 in their division). In the loss to the Atlanta Falcons, Gradkowski was replaced in the 4th quarter by Rattay.

In the first half of the Buccaneers' next game, against the Chicago Bears, Gradkowski was again replaced by Rattay, who led the team from a 24–3 deficit to a score of 31–31, with three touchdowns in the fourth quarter. However, the Buccaneers then lost the game in overtime, 34–31. Rattay was then named the new starting quarterback for the last two games for the season. The Buccaneers finished their season with a 4–12 record, tied for third worst in the NFL.

The Buccaneers sent three players to the 2007 Pro Bowl, cornerback Ronde Barber, tight end/long snapper Dave Moore (A “Need” player according to Saints coach Sean Payton), and late addition outside linebacker Derrick Brooks (as an injury replacement). This would be Brooks' 10th consecutive Pro Bowl and 10th Pro Bowl overall.

=== 2007: A return to grace ===
In 2007, the Buccaneers signed veteran quarterback Jeff Garcia, linebackers Cato June and Patrick Chukwurah, and former New York Jets fullback B.J. Askew. They released three-time Pro Bowl defensive end Simeon Rice and starting middle linebacker Shelton Quarles, both of whom spent the majority of their career in Tampa Bay. Six-time Pro Bowler and 12-year veteran fullback Mike Alstott suffered a neck injury in a preseason match against the New England Patriots. The injury placed Alstott on injured reserve for the rest of the season and led to his retirement in January 2008.

The regular season began with a 20–6 loss to the Seattle Seahawks in Qwest Field. By week six, the Buccaneers had a record of 4–2, including home victories against division rivals the Carolina Panthers and the New Orleans Saints. Running Back Carnell “Cadillac” Williams suffered a season-ending torn patellar tendon in a week 4 home victory over the Panthers, which contributed to a 33–14 blowout loss to former Buccaneers head coach Tony Dungy's Indianapolis Colts the next week. The Buccaneers' misfortune against non-divisional teams was countered as the season progressed by their domination of the NFC South. In week 15, Micheal Spurlock recorded the first ever kick return touchdown ever scored by a Tampa Bay Buccaneer in a home victory against the Atlanta Falcons. They won all but one of their divisional games and, at the peak of their success, had a record of 9–5. Many factors contributed to this, such as the problems faced by Atlanta, whose star quarterback Michael Vick had been arrested on dog fighting charges in the preseason, and the season-ending ACL tear suffered by New Orleans running back Deuce McAllister. they finished off the season on a low point, however, but still won the NFC South division, and qualified for a playoff spot at 9–7.

Tampa Bay were set to host the New York Giants at Raymond James Stadium for their second home playoff game in three seasons. They began well opening up the scoreboard with the first touchdown of the game, which was a 1-yard Earnest Graham run. However, the Giants outscored the Buccaneers 24-0 until the last three minutes of play, when Jeff Garcia completed a touchdown pass to Alex Smith to bring the Bucs back to just a ten-point deficit, although an interception by R. W. McQuarters with two minutes left, sealed the victory for Giants. In the end the Buccaneers had been held to 271 yards of total offense and 3 turnovers, and lost the game 24–14.

=== 2008 ===
On January 28, the Buccaneers re-signed head coach Jon Gruden and general manager Bruce Allen through the 2011 season. Also during the offseason, the Buccaneers expressed interest in acquiring quarterback Brett Favre from the Green Bay Packers, but he eventually signed with the New York Jets instead. The 2008 regular season began with a loss to the New Orleans Saints, followed by three wins, a loss to the Denver Broncos, two more wins, a defeat to the Dallas Cowboys, and four wins over the Kansas City Chiefs, Minnesota Vikings, Detroit Lions, and Saints. At 9–3, the Buccaneers were close to guaranteeing their place in the playoffs, with 4 games remaining in the season. However, they fell to the Carolina Panthers on Monday Night Football, which ended their chances of successfully repeating as division champions. They next lost to the Atlanta Falcons in overtime, followed by their first home loss of the season to the San Diego Chargers.

The final week of the season still held playoff hopes, although it would take a Buccaneers win over the Oakland Raiders coupled with a Dallas Cowboys loss. The Buccaneers couldn't hold their 4th quarter lead against the Raiders, and lost 31–24. Adding insult to injury, Dallas lost their final game against the Philadelphia Eagles, giving the Eagles the final wild card playoff spot over Dallas and the Buccaneers. Having finished 9–7 and missing the playoffs, Jon Gruden was fired January 16, 2009, almost one year to the date he received a contract-extension. General manager Bruce Allen was fired on the same date as well. This would usher in a wholesale change of coaches and players leading up to the 2009 season, with Raheem Morris being elevated to head coach on January 17.

== Coaching carousel and out of the playoffs (2009–2018) ==
=== Raheem Morris era (2009–2011) ===
==== 2009 ====
In 2009, the Buccaneers lost seven consecutive games including an NFL International Series game to the New England Patriots in London. In week nine, the Buccaneers defeated the Green Bay Packers 38–28 after a pair of touchdown passes by rookie quarterback Josh Freeman. Tampa Bay lost four consecutive games before they defeated the Seattle Seahawks in week 15 and the eventual Super Bowl XLIV champion New Orleans Saints in week 16. The Buccaneers lost its last game against the Atlanta Falcons to finish 3–13.

==== 2010 ====
The Buccaneers got off to a 2–0 start in 2010 by beating the Cleveland Browns and Carolina Panthers, but lost to the eventual AFC champion Pittsburgh Steelers 38–13. Following their bye week, they beat the Cincinnati Bengals in Cincinnati 24–21. The Buccaneers faced the defending Super Bowl champion New Orleans Saints at home and were defeated 31–6. The next week the Buccaneers topped the St. Louis Rams 18–17. The Buccaneers defeated the Arizona Cardinals on the road 38–35. With the Buccaneers and the Atlanta Falcons tied for first place in the division at 5–2, a matchup in Atlanta gave the Buccaneers a chance to take sole possession of first place. Trailing 27–14 in the second half, Buccaneers returner Micheal Spurlock returned a Falcons kickoff for a touchdown to put the Buccaneers within a touchdown of the lead. The game came down to a fourth-down attempt to score from the Falcons one-yard line. Rookie running back LeGarrette Blount was stopped up the middle and gave the Falcons the close victory. The Bucs defeated the Carolina Panthers at home 31–16 before beating the San Francisco 49ers 21–0. The next week, the Buccaneers lost a road game to the Baltimore Ravens 17–10. The Buccaneers played the Falcons on national television and lost 28–24.

At 7–5, the Buccaneers had not defeated an opponent with a winning record. In a rainy outing against the Washington Redskins, the Buccaneers won 17–16 then lost to the Detroit Lions at home. The Buccaneers defeated the eventual NFC West champion Seattle Seahawks 38–15 in Tampa.

In the last week of the regular season, the Buccaneers needed a win against the New Orleans Saints in the Superdome, and the Green Bay Packers and New York Giants to lose for the Buccaneers to make the playoffs. The Saints needed to defeat the Buccaneers to gain the No. 1 seed in the NFC. The Buccaneers beat the Saints 23–13, finishing the season with a 10–6 record, its best since 2005. The Packers (who went on to win Super Bowl XLV) and Giants each won their games, and for the second time in three years, the Buccaneers had finished with a winning record yet missed the playoffs.

The season marked a seven-game improvement over the previous one, but no Buccaneers were selected to the 2011 Pro Bowl. Raheem Morris finished second in the Associated Press NFL Coach of the Year voting, and Mike Williams finished second in Offensive Rookie of the Year voting.

==== 2011 ====
The Buccaneers went into 2011 with high expectations, but they ended up not materializing. Things began on an ominous note when they lost at home in Week 1 to the Detroit Lions, who had beaten them the previous December and denied them a playoff appearance. At the bye in Week 7, the Buccaneers were 4–3 and looked promising to make a postseason push. All of that changed rapidly when they abruptly collapsed and ended up not winning another game for the rest of the season for the longest losing streak in franchise history since 1977. On January 2, 2012, Morris was fired as head coach of the Buccaneers after a 4–12 season, including losing their last ten games.

=== 2012 and 2013: Greg Schiano era ===
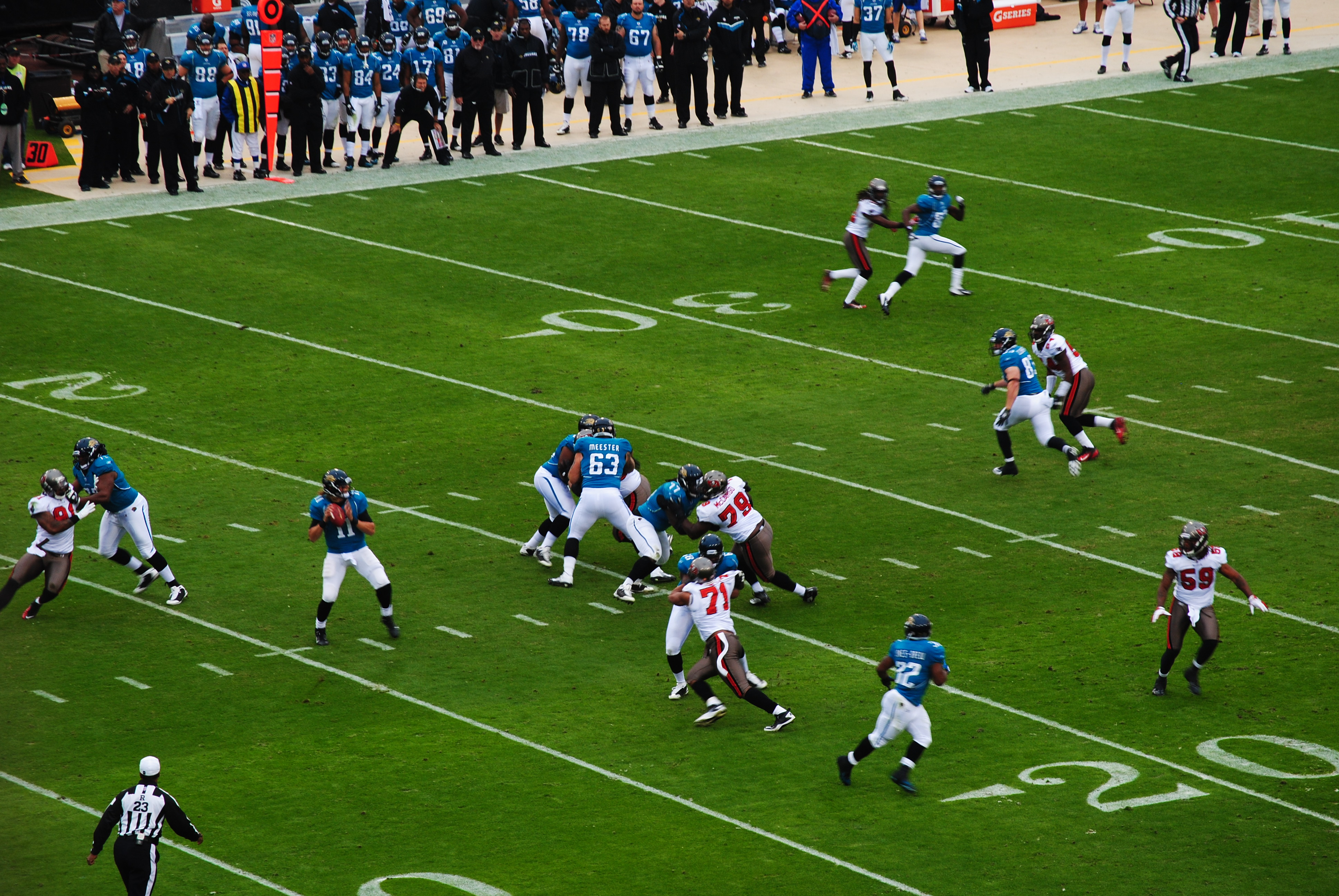
The Bucs vs the Jacksonville Jaguars

About three weeks after firing Raheem Morris, the Buccaneers hired Greg Schiano from Rutgers as the new head coach. During his introductory conference he stated “There will be Buccaneer men, and there will be a Buccaneer Way.” The phrase “The Buccaneer Way” became a slogan amongst fans and local media, describing the new regime and attitude. The team filled out the coaching staff with new faces, including Mike Sullivan, Bill Sheridan, and Butch Davis. In 2013, Dave Wannstedt was also added as special teams coach. In the first day of free agency, the club signed top prospects Vincent Jackson and Carl Nicks, as well as Eric Wright. The $140 million committed to the team during that 24-hour period is considered the largest investment the Glazer family has put into the team going back almost a decade.

The team would finish the 2012 season at 7–9, notably ranking first in rushing defense. The rushing offense was highlighted by the breakout performance of Doug Martin. After two seasons of game day local television blackouts, the improved team began seeing increased attendance and attention, and some blackouts lifted. Six games were blacked out in 2012. For the three-year period of 2010-2012 the Bucs led the NFL in local television blackouts with 19 (Cincinnati was second with 11). Schiano's coaching style, however, drew criticism at the end of a game against the Giants (Schiano's New Jersey homecoming). With the Bucs losing by seven points, but no longer able to stop the clock with a timeout, Schiano ordered his defense to continue to aggressively tackle quarterback Eli Manning, who was taking a knee to end the game, in the hopes of causing a turnover. Those actions prompted Giants coach Tom Coughlin to verbally reprimand Schiano when the two met at midfield after the game. Schiano did not apologize to Coughlin or the Giants, and the team repeated the tactic several times during the season.

Coming into the 2013 season, fans and analysts had better than average expectations for Tampa Bay. They were expected to improve their record, and potentially make a playoffs run. The predictions proved unfounded, as numerous issues on and off the field saw the team collapse. During training camp, a reported rift began to divide Schiano and quarterback Josh Freeman. After an 0–3 start, Freeman was benched, and ultimately released. Schiano started rookie Mike Glennon, but the team continued to lose. The fans' confidence of Schiano began to decay rapidly, and after an 0–8 start, the team finally got its first win of the season on a Monday night against Miami. A brief win streak saw improvements with Glennon at quarterback, and Bobby Rainey took over at running back with stellar numbers after Doug Martin went down with a shoulder injury. There were no blackouts in 2013, as the Glazers bought up the necessary tickets for two of the games to get to the 85% threshold needed to prevent local blackouts.

Despite some individual improvements, and some impressive performances by members of the defense, the team dropped the last three games of the season, and finished 4–12. The team ranked last or near the bottom in almost every offensive category. On December 30, 2013, Schiano and general manager Mark Dominik were fired.

=== 2014 and 2015: Lovie Smith and Jason Licht era ===
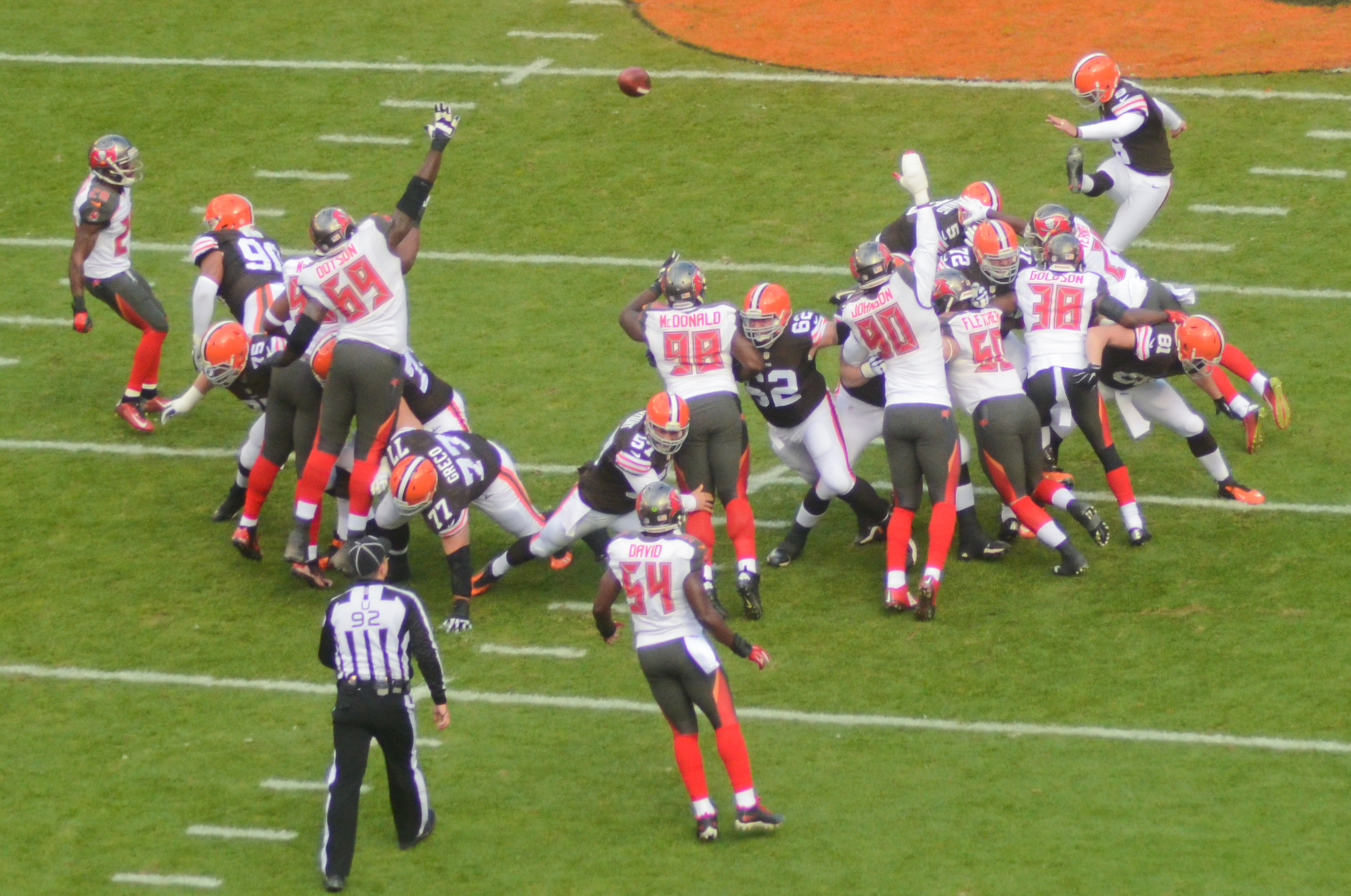
2014 marked the first season under coach Lovie Smith.

On January 1, 2014, Lovie Smith was hired as the new head coach of the Buccaneers, replacing Greg Schiano. Smith had previously spent 5 seasons with the Buccaneers from 1996 to 2001 coaching the linebackers under Tony Dungy. During his first news conference with the Bucs, Smith talked about restoring the quality of the team from the late 1990s and early 2000s: “There was a certain brand of football you expected from us”, Smith said. “You know we would be relentless. There was a brand of football that you got from us each week at Raymond James Stadium. It was hard for opponents to come in and win. We have gotten away from that a little bit, and it’s time ... for us to become a relevant team again."

On January 21, 2014, Jason Licht was hired as the new general manager, replacing Mark Dominik.

The Bucs began the 2014 season 0–3, including a 56–14 loss to the Atlanta Falcons on Thursday Night Football. With second-year quarterback Mike Glennon as the starter, the Bucs earned its first victory of the season in Pittsburgh against the Steelers 27–24. The Bucs lost the next four games, two overtime losses against the New Orleans Saints and the Minnesota Vikings, a loss to the Baltimore Ravens and a loss against the Cleveland Browns.

Going into week 10 at 1–8, veteran free agent quarterback Josh McCown returned as starter for the Bucs' game against the Falcons, which resulted in a 27–17 loss. The Bucs won 27–7 against the Washington Redskins. The Bucs lost the next three games and were eliminated from the playoffs. The Bucs finished 2–14, securing the first-overall draft pick in the 2015 NFL draft.

Despite the team's record, first-round draft pick wide receiver Mike Evans had more than 1,000 receiving yards and became the youngest NFL player to record more than 200 receiving yards in a single game. Vincent Jackson had more than 1,000 yards receiving, which represented Tampa Bay's first pair of 1,000 yard receivers in a season.

After the 2014 season, Tampa Bay hired Ben Steele to become the team's new offensive quality control coach and former Atlanta Falcons offensive coordinator, Dirk Koetter.

With the first overall pick in the 2015 NFL draft, the Bucs selected Jameis Winston from Florida State.

On January 6, 2016, Smith was fired by the Buccaneers after posting a record of 8–24 in his two seasons, including a 6–10 record in the 2015 season.

=== 2016–2018: Dirk Koetter era ===
On January 15, 2016, Dirk Koetter was promoted from offensive coordinator to become the new head coach of the Tampa Bay Buccaneers.

The Bucs finished 9–7 with Koetter as head coach, but won only 10 games in the next two seasons, and on December 30, 2018, the team fired Koetter as head coach.

== Bruce Arians and Tom Brady era (2019–2022) ==
=== 2019: Bruce Arians' first year as head coach ===
In the 2019 off-season the Buccaneers signed former Arizona Cardinals head coach Bruce Arians out of retirement to a four-year contract. They signed offensive tackle Donovan Smith, linebacker Shaquil Barrett, linebacker Deone Bucannon and former first-round pick wide receiver Breshad Perriman.

In Arians' first season as head coach, the team finished the season 7–9. Winston ended his season with more than 5,000 passing yards, 33 touchdowns and 30 interceptions, becoming the first quarterback in NFL history to simultaneously throw for more than 30 touchdowns and interceptions in the same season.

=== 2020: Super Bowl victory ===
In the 2020 off-season, the Bucs signed six-time Super Bowl champion and former New England Patriots quarterback Tom Brady to a two-year, $25 million per year guaranteed salary with $4.5 million in incentives per year. Patriots tight end Rob Gronkowski came out of retirement to play for the Buccaneers.

Brady led the team to an 11–5 record in 2020 and a playoff berth for the first time since 2007, defeating the Washington Football Team in the wild card round to win their first postseason game since their Super Bowl-winning 2002 season. The Bucs defeated division rivals New Orleans Saints and eliminated the top-seeded Green Bay Packers in the NFC Championship Game to win their first conference title in 18 years. With the win, the Bucs advanced to Super Bowl LV against the Kansas City Chiefs, as the first wild card team to appear in the Super Bowl since the 2010 Green Bay Packers won Super Bowl XLV, and the first team in NFL history to play the Super Bowl in their home stadium. The Buccaneers defeated the Chiefs 31–9 for second Super Bowl victory. Brady won his NFL-record fifth Super Bowl MVP award.

=== 2021: Coming up short ===
The Buccaneers ended 2021 with a 13–4 record. They defeated the Philadelphia Eagles to begin the postseason, but lost 30–27 to the Los Angeles Rams to end the season. This would also be the final year of Bruce Arians as head coach as he announced his retirement on March 30, 2022. Defensive Coordinator Todd Bowles took over the next season.

== Tom Brady's final season and Todd Bowles era begins (2022–present) ==
=== 2022: End of an era ===
On February 1, 2022, Brady announced his retirement from professional football, only to return 40 days later for a 23rd NFL season. Immediately after Bruce Arians announcement of his retirement, Todd Bowles took over as head coach on March 30, 2022. The Bucs finished the season 8–9, and was the No. 4 seed in the NFC. The Bucs lost to the Dallas Cowboys 31–14 to complete the season. On February 1, 2023, exactly 1 year after Brady announced his retirement from professional football, he officially announced his retirement for good.

=== 2023: Baker Mayfield era begins ===
On March 15, 2023, six weeks after Tom Brady's retirement, former Cleveland Browns quarterback Baker Mayfield became the team's starting quarterback for the season.

After the Bucs started at 3–1, they lost 6 out of the 7 games they played. While the Bucs sat at 4–7, the Bucs rebounded and won their last 5 out of 6 games to finish at 9–8 to win their third straight NFC South title and the NFC's #4 seed of the playoffs. The Buccaneers blew out the defending NFC Champions Philadelphia Eagles 32–9. Their season ended with a 31–23 loss to the Detroit Lions.

=== 2024: Buccaneers one and done in the playoffs ===
The Buccaneers started off the season 3–1, with wins against playoff-bound teams Washington, Detroit, and Philadelphia. However, they lost five of their next six games to slide to 4–6. The mid-season slump saw two overtime losses, a last-second loss to the 49ers, but most troublesome, a season sweep by division rival Atlanta, along with a season-ending injury to wide receiver Chris Godwin. The team rebounded after their bye week, winning six out of their final seven games to finish to 10–7. Tampa Bay improved on their 9–8 record from 2023 and won the NFC South for a franchise-best fourth consecutive season following a victory against the New Orleans Saints to close out the regular season and the 3rd seed of the playoffs. However, in heartbreaking fashion, the Buccaneers would lose in the Wild Card playoff game at home to the Washington Commanders by a score of 23–20, allowing the Commanders to win their first playoff game since 2005.

=== 2025: Buccaneers miss playoffs ===
The Buccaneers started strong with a 6–2 record. After their week 9 bye, they would collapse to a 7–9 record. Despite beating NFC South rival Carolina Panthers in Week 18 to finish 8–9, the Atlanta Falcons' victory over rival New Orleans Saints the next day gave the division title to the Panthers, eliminating the Buccaneers.
