= 2012 Tampa Bay Buccaneers season =

NFL team season

- Owner: Malcolm Glazer
- General manager: Mark Dominik
- Head coach: Greg Schiano
- Home stadium: Raymond James Stadium

Results
- Record: 7–9
- Division place: 4th NFC South
- Playoffs: Did not qualify
- Pro Bowlers: DT Gerald McCoy; WR Vincent Jackson; RB Doug Martin

Uniform
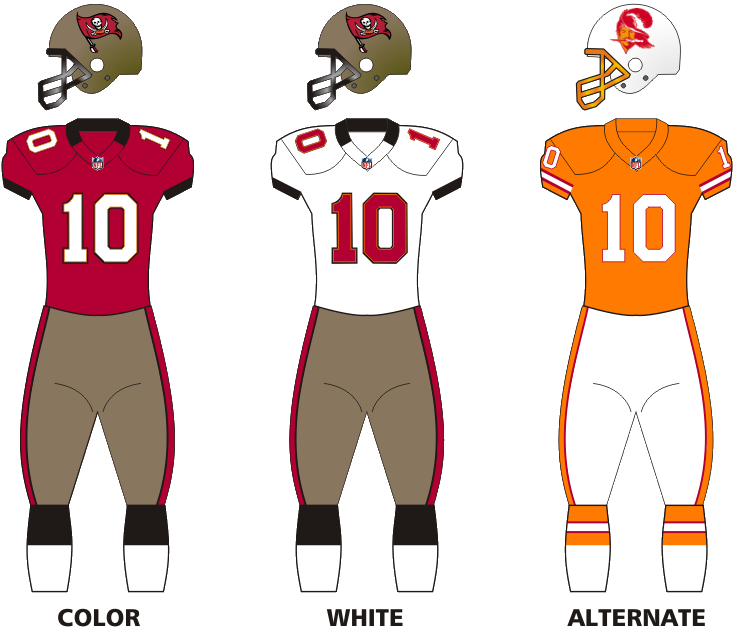

The 2012 season was the Tampa Bay Buccaneers' 37th in the National Football League (NFL) and their first season under head coach Greg Schiano after the former head coach Raheem Morris was fired due to the team's record of 4–12 in 2011. This was Ronde Barber's last season before retiring in the 2013 offseason.

Though the team did not make the postseason, the team improved their record to 7–9, and finished the regular season with team records in several statistical categories. The team set a franchise record with 5,820 yards of total offense and 389 total points scored. The defense ranked No. 1 in the league against the rush (82.5 yard/game), also a franchise record. Individual team records include most touchdown passes (27) and most passing yards (4,065) by Josh Freeman, as well as Doug Martin's team rookie rushing record of 1,454 yards. Martin finished with five games of 100+ yards rushing, including a breakout game against Oakland in Week 8 rushing for 251 yards and four touchdowns. They also finished with the league's worst passing defense, allowing 4,758 yards (297 yard/game).

== Offseason ==
=== 2012 draft class ===
The Buccaneers traded its 2011 & 2012 fourth-round selection to the Philadelphia Eagles in exchange for the Philadelphia Eagles 2011 fourth-round selection to select tight end Luke Stocker during the 2011 NFL draft. The Buccaneers were selected to draft a player in the third round of the 2012 NFL draft, until a trade with the Houston Texans that took place causing the team to trade their third-round selection to move up certain spots to acquire Lavonte David in the second round. Drake Dunsmore was the only rookie that did not make the 53-man roster during roster cuts. However, Drake Dunsmore did end up making the practice squad of the Buccaneers, but he decided later to retire on May 2, 2013.

2012 Tampa Bay Buccaneers Draft
Round	Selection	Player	Position	College
1	7	Mark Barron	Safety	Alabama
1	31	Doug Martin	Running back	Boise State
2	58	Lavonte David	Linebacker	Nebraska
5	140	Najee Goode	Linebacker	W. Virginia
6	174	Keith Tandy	Cornerback	W. Virginia
7	212	Michael Smith	Running back	Utah State
7	233	Drake Dunsmore	Tight end	Northwestern

== Free Agent Acquisitions and Transactions ==
- Note that each player under new members is currently on the 53-man active roster or on the reserve list.

=== Players that joined the team, as new members ===
- Dan Orlovsky
- Vincent Jackson
- Jamon Meredith
- Carl Nicks
- Gary Gibson
- Eric Wright

Sources: as of 12/30/2013 3:00 p.m. Pacific Time

== Preseason ==
The Buccaneers 2012 preseason schedule was announced on April 4, 2012. On August 25, Davin Joseph was placed on injured reserve with a season-ending knee injury which occurred Week 2 of the preseason at home against the New England Patriots. The Buccaneers finished the 2012 preseason with a record of 2–2 under new head coach Greg Schiano.

Week	Date	Opponent	Result	Record	Venue	Recap
1	August 10	at Miami Dolphins	W 20–7	1–0	Sun Life Stadium	Recap
2	August 17	Tennessee Titans	L 7–30	1–1	Raymond James Stadium	Recap
3	August 24	New England Patriots	W 30–28	2–1	Raymond James Stadium	Recap
4	August 29	at Washington Redskins	L 3–30	2–2	FedExField	Recap

== Regular season ==
On opening day against Carolina, Ronde Barber started his 200th consecutive game as a member of the Tampa Bay Buccaneers. The 2002 Super Bowl team reunited in attendance for the home game against the Eagles in Week 14. The Buccaneers finished the 2012 season with a record of 7–9 under new head coach Greg Schiano.

Week	Date	Opponent	Result	Record	Venue	Recap
1	September 9	Carolina Panthers	W 16–10	1–0	Raymond James Stadium	Recap
2	September 16	at New York Giants	L 34–41	1–1	MetLife Stadium	Recap
3	September 23	at Dallas Cowboys	L 10–16	1–2	Cowboys Stadium	Recap
4	September 30	Washington Redskins	L 22–24	1–3	Raymond James Stadium	Recap
5	Bye					
6	October 14	Kansas City Chiefs	W 38–10	2–3	Raymond James Stadium	Recap
7	October 21	New Orleans Saints	L 28–35	2–4	Raymond James Stadium	Recap
8	October 25	at Minnesota Vikings	W 36–17	3–4	Hubert H. Humphrey Metrodome	Recap
9	November 4	at Oakland Raiders	W 42–32	4–4	O.co Coliseum	Recap
10	November 11	San Diego Chargers	W 34–24	5–4	Raymond James Stadium	Recap
11	November 18	at Carolina Panthers	W 27–21 (OT)	6–4	Bank of America Stadium	Recap
12	November 25	Atlanta Falcons	L 23–24	6–5	Raymond James Stadium	Recap
13	December 2	at Denver Broncos	L 23–31	6–6	Sports Authority Field at Mile High	Recap
14	December 9	Philadelphia Eagles	L 21–23	6–7	Raymond James Stadium	Recap
15	December 16	at New Orleans Saints	L 0–41	6–8	Mercedes-Benz Superdome	Recap
16	December 23	St. Louis Rams	L 13–28	6–9	Raymond James Stadium	Recap
17	December 30	at Atlanta Falcons	W 22–17	7–9	Georgia Dome	Recap

=== Season summary ===
New head coach Greg Schiano installed a new regime and attitude at Tampa Bay upon his arrival. An improved offense set several team records and milestones, and the team ranked No. 1 in rushing defense in the NFL. A weak passing defense (32nd), however, and a five-game losing streak late in the season, saw the team ultimately fall from playoff contention.

Tampa Bay won on opening day, but lost three straight games to NFC East opponents in September. However, the team rebounded and won five of their next six games, primarily behind the breakout efforts of rookie running back Doug Martin. In week 8, the team raised eyebrows by winning a nationally televised Thursday night game against the playoff-bound Vikings, then followed it up by a stellar performance by Martin the following week. At Oakland in week 9, Martin rushed for 251 yards and four touchdowns, one of the most prolific statistical performances in NFL history. After a comeback overtime win at Carolina, the team sat at 6–4, and actually controlled their own destiny for a wild card playoff berth.

Late in November, however, the team began a slump, and fell from the playoff picture. A one-point loss against Atlanta, and a last-second loss versus Philadelphia were part of a five-game losing streak. The team rebounded and finished on a high note, beating the #1 seed Falcons on the road in the final week of the regular season. After a dismal 4–12 record in 2011, the team finished a fairly respectable 7–9 in 2012.

== Game summaries ==
=== Week 1: vs. Carolina Panthers ===
Week One: Carolina Panthers at Tampa Bay Buccaneers – Game summary

Quarter	1	2	3	4	Total
Panthers	0	0	7	3	10
Buccaneers	10	3	0	3	16

at Raymond James Stadium, Tampa, Florida

- Date: Sunday September 9, 2012
- Game time: 4:25 p.m. EDT
- Game weather: 83 °F (28 °C), cloudy
- Game attendance: 51,533 (blacked out locally)
- Referee: Jerry Hughes
- TV announcers (Fox): Ron Pitts, Mike Martz and Kristina Pink (blacked out locally)

Game information

First quarter

- TB – Mike Williams 6-yard pass from Josh Freeman (Connor Barth kick), 5:20. Buccaneers 7–0. Drive: 13 plays, 80 yards, 7:20.
- TB – Connor Barth 36-yard field goal, 1:20. Buccaneers 10–0. Drive: 5 plays, 32 yards, 2:27.

Second quarter

- TB – Connor Barth 20-yard field goal, 2:55. Buccaneers 13–0. Drive: 13 plays, 90 yards, 8:43.

Third quarter

- CAR – Brandon LaFell 22-yard pass from Cam Newton (Justin Medlock kick), 8:55. Buccaneers 13–7. Drive: 5 plays, 70 yards, 2:26.

Fourth quarter

- TB – Connor Barth 40-yard field goal, 7:58. Buccaneers 16–7. Drive: 7 plays, 20 yards, 3:12.
- CAR – Justin Medlock 21-yard field goal, 2:46. Buccaneers 16–10. Drive: 8 plays, 86 yards, 2:20.

Top passers

- CAR – Cam Newton – 23/33, 303 yards, 1 TD, 2 INT
- TB – Josh Freeman – 16/24, 138 yards, 1 TD

Top rushers

- CAR – Kealoha Pilares – 1 rush, 5 yards
- TB – Doug Martin – 24 rushes, 95 yards

Top receivers

- CAR – Steve Smith Sr. – 7 receptions, 106 yards
- TB – Vincent Jackson – 4 receptions, 47 yards

The Tampa Bay defense held Carolina to only 10 yards rushing, snapping a ten-game losing streak dating back to week 6 of the 2011 NFL season. Tampa Bay's last win was at home on October 16, 2011, against the Saints (26–20). Ronde Barber started his 200th consecutive game, finishing the game with a sack and an interception.

=== Week 2: at New York Giants ===
Week Two: Tampa Bay Buccaneers at New York Giants – Game summary

Quarter	1	2	3	4	Total
Buccaneers	3	21	3	7	34
Giants	6	7	3	25	41

at MetLife Stadium, East Rutherford, New Jersey

- Date: Sunday September 16, 2012
- Game time: 1:00 p.m. EDT
- Game weather: 73 °F (23 °C), mostly sunny
- Referee: Jim Core
- TV announcers (Fox): Joe Buck, Troy Aikman and Pam Oliver

Game information

First quarter

- NYG – Lawrence Tynes 37-yard field goal, 12:43. Giants 3–0. Drive: 6 plays, 51 yards, 2:17.
- TB – Connor Barth 45-yard field goal, 8:42. Tied 3–3. Drive: 7 plays, 60 yards, 4:01.
- NYG – Lawrence Tynes 24-yard field goal, 2:54. Giants 6–3. Drive: 12 plays, 63 yards, 5:48.

Second quarter

- TB – Vincent Jackson 29-yard pass from Josh Freeman (Connor Barth kick), 13:48. Buccaneers 10–6. Drive: 3 plays, 28 yards, 0:56.
- TB – Doug Martin 8-yard run (Connor Barth kick), 6:19. Buccaneers 17–6. Drive: 2 plays, 13 yards, 0:47.
- NYG – Hakeem Nicks 23-yard pass from Eli Manning (Lawrence Tynes kick), 1:54. Buccaneers 17–13. Drive: 8 plays, 80 yards, 4:25.
- TB – Eric Wright 60-yard interception return (Connor Barth kick), 0:08. Buccaneers 24–13.

Third quarter

- TB – Connor Barth 52-yard field goal, 13:14. Buccaneers 27–13. Drive: 5 plays, 14 yards, 1:46.
- NYG – Lawrence Tynes 36-yard field goal, 0:39. Buccaneers 27–16. Drive: 13 plays, 64 yards, 5:40.

Fourth quarter

- NYG – Lawrence Tynes 24-yard field goal, 12:22. Buccaneers 27–19. Drive: 9 plays, 30 yards, 2:59.
- NYG – Victor Cruz 80-yard pass from Eli Manning (Andre Brown run), 6:48. Tied 27–27. Drive: 3 plays, 88 yards, 0:53.
- NYG – Martellus Bennett 33-yard pass from Eli Manning (Lawrence Tynes kick), 3:59. Giants 34–27. Drive: 4 plays, 67 yards, 1:44.
- TB – Mike Williams 41-yard pass from Josh Freeman (Connor Barth kick), 1:58. Tied 34–34. Drive: 5 plays, 80 yards, 2:01.
- NYG – Andre Brown 2-yard run (Lawrence Tynes kick), 0:31. Giants 41–34. Drive: 4 plays, 80 yards, 1:27.

Top passers

- TB – Josh Freeman – 15/28, 243 yards, 2 TD, 2 INT
- NYG – Eli Manning – 31/51, 510 yards, 3 TD, 3 INT

Top rushers

- TB – Doug Martin – 20 rushes, 66 yards, TD
- NYG – Andre Brown – 13 rushes, 71 yards, TD

Top receivers

- TB – Vincent Jackson – 5 receptions, 128 yards, TD
- NYG – Hakeem Nicks – 10 receptions, 199 yards, TD

Eli Manning threw for 510 yards, while the Tampa Bay defense allowed over 600 yards to the New York Giants' offense. This was the most offensive yards allowed in Buccaneers franchise history. Tampa Bay had the lead throughout the third quarter, but the Giants came back to win the game in the fourth quarter scoring 25 points.

=== Week 3: at Dallas Cowboys ===
Week Three: Tampa Bay Buccaneers at Dallas Cowboys – Game summary

Quarter	1	2	3	4	Total
Buccaneers	7	0	0	3	10
Cowboys	7	3	0	6	16

at Cowboys Stadium, Arlington, Texas

- Date: Sunday September 23, 2012
- Game time: 1:00 p.m. EDT/12:00 p.m. CDT
- Game weather: Played indoors (retractable roof closed)
- Game attendance: 81,984
- Referee: Robert Dalton
- TV announcers (Fox): Joe Buck, Troy Aikman and Pam Oliver

Game information

First quarter

- TB – Luke Stocker 1-yard pass from Josh Freeman (Connor Barth kick), 10:51. Buccaneers 7–0. Drive: 6 plays, 29 yards, 3:20.
- DAL – DeMarco Murray 11-yard run (Dan Bailey kick), 1:22. Tied 7–7. Drive: 4 plays, 23 yards, 2:01.

Second quarter

- DAL – Dan Bailey 32-yard field goal, 2:51. Cowboys 10–7. Drive: 7 plays, 11 yards, 3:25.

Third quarter

- No scoring plays.

Fourth quarter

- DAL – Dan Bailey 26-yard field goal, 11:10. Cowboys 13–7. Drive: 9 plays, 72 yards, 5:26.
- DAL – Dan Bailey 22-yard field goal, 2:43. Cowboys 16–7. Drive: 4 plays, 2 yards, 2:01.
- TB – Connor Barth 28-yard field goal, 0:40. Cowboys 16–10. Drive: 11 plays, 70 yards, 2:03.

Top passers

- TB – Josh Freeman – 10/28, 110 yards, TD, INT
- DAL – Tony Romo – 25/39, 283 yards, INT

Top rushers

- TB – Doug Martin – 19 rushes, 53 yards
- DAL – DeMarco Murray – 18 rushes, 38 yards, TD

Top receivers

- TB – Mike Williams – 2 receptions, 33 yards
- DAL – Miles Austin – 5 receptions, 107 yards

Aqib Talib intercepted Tony Romo on the fourth play of the game, which led to a Tampa Bay touchdown and an early lead 7–0 over the Cowboys. However, the Buccaneer offense sputtered, and failed to score on their next nine possessions. In the first 57 minutes of the game, Tampa Bay had only 96 net yards of offense. Adrian Clayborn injured his knee throughout the second half and was expected to miss the rest of the season after the Buccaneers placed him on injured reserve.

=== Week 4: vs. Washington Redskins ===
Week Four: Washington Redskins at Tampa Bay Buccaneers – Game summary

Quarter	1	2	3	4	Total
Redskins	7	14	0	3	24
Buccaneers	3	3	7	9	22

at Raymond James Stadium, Tampa, Florida

- Date: Sunday September 30, 2012
- Game time: 4:25 p.m. EDT
- Game weather: 89 °F (32 °C), sunny
- Game attendance: 58,191 (blacked out locally)
- Referee: Alberto Riveron
- TV announcers (Fox): Chris Myers, Tim Ryan and Krista Voda (blacked out locally)

Game information

First quarter

- TB – Connor Barth 50-yard field goal, 4:42. Buccaneers 3–0. Drive: 7 plays, 38 yards, 4:30.
- WAS – Pierre Garcon fumble recovery in endzone (Billy Cundiff kick), 0:00. Redskins 7–3. Drive: 7 plays, 75 yards, 4:42.

Second quarter

- WAS – Robert Griffin III 5-yard run (Billy Cundiff kick), 7:26. Redskins 14–3. Drive: 7 plays, 35 yards, 3:43.
- WAS – Alfred Morris 39-yard run (Billy Cundiff kick), 5:15. Redskins 21–3. Drive: 2 plays, 60 yards, 0:48.
- TB – Connor Barth 57-yard field goal, 1:55. Redskins 21–6. Drive: 9 plays, 41 yards, 3:20.

Third quarter

- TB – Vincent Jackson 7-yard pass from Josh Freeman (Connor Barth kick), 1:56. Redskins 21–13. Drive: 5 plays, 85 yards, 2:28.

Fourth quarter

- TB – LeGarrette Blount 2-yard run (pass failed), 9:41. Redskins 21–19. Drive: 5 plays, 79 yards, 2:32.
- TB – Connor Barth 47-yard field goal, 1:42. Buccaneers 22–21. Drive: 7 plays, 36 yards, 1:56.
- WAS – Billy Cundiff 41-yard field goal, 0:03. Redskins 24–22. Drive: 7 plays, 56 yards, 1:39.

Top passers

- WAS – Robert Griffin III – 26/35, 323 yards
- TB – Josh Freeman – 24/39, 299 yards, TD, INT

Top rushers

- WAS – Alfred Morris – 21 rushes, 113 yards, TD
- TB – Doug Martin – 8 rushes, 33 yards

Top receivers

- WAS – Fred Davis – 4 receptions, 70 yards
- TB – Mike Williams – 4 receptions, 115 yards

The Buccaneers allowed 160 rushing yards to the Redskins. This was the first time Tampa Bay allowed a 100-yard rushing performance to any team this season. The Buccaneers came back late in the 4th quarter leading 22–21. However, the Redskins scored the winning field goal to take the win 24–22.

=== Week 6: vs. Kansas City Chiefs ===
Week Six: Kansas City Chiefs at Tampa Bay Buccaneers – Game summary

Quarter	1	2	3	4	Total
Chiefs	0	3	0	7	10
Buccaneers	7	0	14	17	38

at Raymond James Stadium, Tampa, Florida

- Date: Sunday, October 14, 2012
- Game time: 1:00 p.m. EDT
- Game weather: 85 °F (29 °C), sunny
- Game attendance: 46,500 (blacked out locally)
- Referee: Walt Coleman
- TV announcers (CBS): Marv Albert and Rich Gannon (blacked out locally)

Game information

First quarter

- TB – Mike Williams 62-yard pass from Josh Freeman (Connor Barth kick), 0:18. Buccaneers 7–0. Drive: 1 play, 62 yards, 0:12.

Second quarter

- KC – Ryan Succop 38-yard field goal, 7:45. Buccaneers 7–3. Drive: 15 plays, 59 yards, 7:33.

Third quarter

- TB – Vincent Jackson 19-yard pass from Josh Freeman (Connor Barth kick), 12:46. Buccaneers 14–3. Drive: 4 plays, 80 yards, 2:14.
- TB – Ronde Barber 78-yard interception return (Connor Barth kick), 9:36. Buccaneers 21–3.

Fourth quarter

- KC – Edgar Jones 11-yard return of blocked punt (Ryan Succop kick), 14:01. Buccaneers 21–10.
- TB – Connor Barth 27-yard field goal, 10:34. Buccaneers 24–10. Drive: 7 plays, 69 yards, 3:24.
- TB – Vincent Jackson 17-yard pass from Josh Freeman (Connor Barth kick), 6:43. Buccaneers 31–10. Drive: 5 plays, 85 yards, 2:46.
- TB – LeGarrette Blount 12-yard run (Connor Barth kick), 1:53. Buccaneers 38–10. Drive: 5 plays, 53 yards, 2:41.

Top passers

- KC – Brady Quinn – 22/38, 180 yards, 2 INT
- TB – Josh Freeman – 15/26, 328 yards, 3 TD, INT

Top rushers

- KC – Jamaal Charles – 12 rushes, 40 yards
- TB – Doug Martin – 13 rushes, 76 yards

Top receivers

- KC – Steve Maneri – 4 receptions, 45 yards
- TB – Mike Williams – 4 receptions, 113 yards, TD

Josh Freeman threw for 328 yards and three touchdown passes, as Tampa Bay routed the Kansas City Chiefs 38–10. Tampa Bay had 463 yards of total offense, which was third best for a home game in franchise history. Brady Quinn started at quarterback for Kansas City for the injured Matt Cassel, who suffered a concussion in the previous week's game against the Ravens. During the third quarter, Ronde Barber returned a 78-yard interception for a touchdown. Barber has 12 career return touchdowns, which is tied for third all-time in NFL history. Barber now is the first player in NFL history with at least eight interceptions returned for touchdowns, four fumble recoveries returned for touchdowns and a punt return for a touchdown. Barber's eight career interceptions returned for touchdowns tied him for seventh in NFL history. Barber only needs one more return touchdown to tie Rod Woodson and Darren Sharper, who have 13 return touchdowns in their respected careers. Paul Gruber was inducted into Tampa Bay's Ring of Honor during halftime. Tampa Bay held the Chiefs to 80 rushing yards on 30 carries. Kansas City came into the game averaging 180.8 rushing yards a game, which ranked second in the NFL. Jamaal Charles was the #1 rushing leader in the NFL with 551 rushing yards coming into the game, but the Tampa Bay defense held Charles to only 40 rushing yards during the entire game.

=== Week 7: vs. New Orleans Saints ===
Week Seven: New Orleans Saints at Tampa Bay Buccaneers – Game summary

Quarter	1	2	3	4	Total
Saints	7	21	0	7	35
Buccaneers	14	7	0	7	28

at Raymond James Stadium, Tampa, Florida

- Date: Sunday October 21, 2012
- Game time: 1:00 p.m. EDT
- Game weather: 77 °F (25 °C), sunny
- Game attendance: 58,906
- Referee: Jerome Boger
- TV announcers (Fox): Dick Stockton, John Lynch and Jennifer Hale

Game information

First quarter

- TB – Tiquan Underwood 13-yard pass from Josh Freeman (Connor Barth kick), 12:22. Buccaneers 7–0. Drive: 1 play, 13 yards, 0:05.
- TB – Doug Martin 36-yard run (Connor Barth kick), 5:55. Buccaneers 14–0. Drive: 10 plays, 76 yards, 4:58.
- NO – Marques Colston 17-yard pass from Drew Brees (Garrett Hartley kick), 1:46. Buccaneers 14–7. Drive: 8 plays, 80 yards, 4:09.

Second quarter

- TB – Vincent Jackson 17-yard pass from Josh Freeman (Connor Barth kick), 13:18. Buccaneers 21–7. Drive: 6 plays, 80 yards, 3:28.
- NO – Darren Sproles 9-yard pass from Drew Brees (Garrett Hartley kick), 9:24. Buccaneers 21–14. Drive: 9 plays, 80 yards, 3:54.
- NO – Joe Morgan 48-yard pass from Drew Brees (Garrett Hartley kick), 4:35. Tied 21–21. Drive: 5 plays, 79 yards, 2:45.
- NO – David Thomas 20-yard pass from Drew Brees (Garrett Hartley kick), 0:15. Saints 28–21. Drive: 9 plays, 72 yards, 1:38.

Third quarter

- No scoring plays.

Fourth quarter

- NO – Pierre Thomas 5-yard run (Garrett Hartley kick), 13:23. Saints 35–21. Drive: 12 plays, 95 yards, 5:01.
- TB – Dallas Clark 3-yard pass from Josh Freeman (Connor Barth kick), 4:10. Saints 35–28. Drive: 14 plays, 81 yards, 6:18.

Top passers

- NO – Drew Brees – 27/37, 377 yards, 4 TD, INT
- TB – Josh Freeman – 24/42, 420 yards, 3 TD

Top rushers

- NO – Pierre Thomas – 13 rushes, 32 yards, TD
- TB – Doug Martin – 16 rushes, 85 yards, TD

Top receivers

- NO – Lance Moore – 9 receptions, 121 yards
- TB – Vincent Jackson – 7 receptions, 216 yards, TD

Ronde Barber intercepted Drew Brees in the first quarter to record his 46th career interception. The Saints defense allowed over 500 offensive yards to the Buccaneers. Josh Freeman threw for a career-high 420 yards and 3 touchdowns. Tampa Bay defense held the Saints to 81 rushing yards. Vincent Jackson had 7 receptions for a franchise record 216 yards and a touchdown. Jackson had a 95-yard catch, but failed to score after Malcolm Jenkins tackled him from behind.

Trailing by seven points in the final two minutes, Freeman drove the Buccaneers deep into the red zone. On the final play of regulation, Freeman threw an apparent game-tying touchdown pass to Mike Williams in the back of the endzone as time expired. However, the touchdown did not count because it was determined that Williams had stepped out of bounds before making the catch. This was the first home game of the season that was not blacked out and televised locally, and the first Sunday afternoon game at home to not be blacked out since 2009.

=== Week 8: at Minnesota Vikings ===
Week Eight: Tampa Bay Buccaneers at Minnesota Vikings – Game summary

Quarter	1	2	3	4	Total
Buccaneers	10	10	10	6	36
Vikings	0	10	7	0	17

at Mall of America Field at the Hubert H. Humphrey Metrodome, Minneapolis, Minnesota

- Date: Thursday October 25, 2012
- Game time: 8:20 p.m. EDT/7:20 p.m. CDT
- Game weather: Played indoors (dome stadium)
- Game attendance: 60,860
- Referee: Ron Winter
- TV announcers (NFLN): Brad Nessler, Mike Mayock and Alex Flanagan

Game information

First quarter

- TB – Connor Barth 28-yard field goal, 9:48. Buccaneers 3–0. Drive: 6 plays, 48 yards, 1:48.
- TB – Erik Lorig 1-yard pass from Josh Freeman (Connor Barth kick), 3:34. Buccaneers 10–0. Drive: 8 plays, 48 yards, 4:33.

Second quarter

- TB – Connor Barth 40-yard field goal, 12:20. Buccaneers 13–0. Drive: 10 plays, 32 yards, 4:20.
- MIN – Percy Harvin 18-yard pass from Christian Ponder (Blair Walsh kick), 9:39. Buccaneers 13–7. Drive: 5 plays, 80 yards, 2:41.
- TB – Mike Williams 3-yard pass from Josh Freeman (Connor Barth kick), 4:30. Buccaneers 20–7. Drive: 6 plays, 37 yards, 2:38.
- MIN – Blair Walsh 51-yard field goal, 1:40. Buccaneers 20–10. Drive: 10 plays, 47 yards, 2:50.

Third quarter

- TB – Doug Martin 64-yard pass from Josh Freeman (Connor Barth kick), 13:39. Buccaneers 27–10. Drive: 4 plays, 80 yards, 1:21.
- TB – Connor Barth 38-yard field goal, 7:50. Buccaneers 30–10. Drive: 8 plays, 38 yards, 4:22.
- MIN – Adrian Peterson 64-yard run (Blair Walsh kick), 7:28. Buccaneers 30–17. Drive: 2 plays, 64 yards, 0:22.

Fourth quarter

- TB – Doug Martin 1-yard run (pass failed), 7:03. Buccaneers 36–17. Drive: 16 plays, 87 yards, 9:09.

Top passers

- TB – Josh Freeman – 19/36, 262 yards, 3 TD
- MIN – Christian Ponder – 19/35, 251 yards, TD, INT

Top rushers

- TB – Doug Martin – 29 rushes, 135 yards, TD
- MIN – Adrian Peterson – 15 rushes, 123 yards, TD

Top receivers

- TB – Doug Martin – 3 receptions, 79 yards, TD
- MIN – Percy Harvin – 7 receptions, 90 yards, TD

This win snapped a nine-game away losing streak for Tampa Bay dating back to last season. The Buccaneers last road win was against the Vikings in Minnesota in week 2 when the Bucs came back and won 24–20 after trailing 17–0 in the third quarter. Doug Martin held the spotlight on this night. Martin ran the ball 29 times for 135 rushing yards and a rushing touchdown. Martin scored two touchdowns on this night and he had 100 rushing yards before halftime. Adding to that, he caught three passes for 79 yards, in which he scored a 64-yard passing touchdown on a screen play. Martin's 214 total offensive yards is the 5th best single game total in Buccaneer history. Buccaneer QB Josh Freeman had his third consecutive game with three touchdown passes, in which is a new franchise record. Freeman threw for 262 yards and has a streak of consecutive games with a touchdown pass with 10. There were three takeaways in the game, all of them belonging to the Tampa Bay defense. Ronde Barber and Michael Bennett forced fumbles, with the Bucs recovering both of them in the second quarter. Those turnovers were converted into points. This provided the difference in the Bucs 20–10 halftime lead over the Vikings. Leonard Johnson also ended Minnesota's last drive with an interception. Negative plays tackles behind the line of scrimmage have become the Buccaneers’ strength this season. They entered Week 8 leading the NFL in that category. The hits kept coming Thursday night as Tampa Bay had seven more tackles for loss, including three sacks. The Tampa Bay defense allowed Adrian Peterson and the Minnesota offense to rush for 141 total rushing yards. The Vikings were the second team this season to rush over 100 yards as the Redskins were the first team to do so with Robert Griffen III. The Buc's offensive line only allowed 1 sack to Jared Allen and the defense. Doug Martin carried the load, becoming the first player in Buccaneers history with 135 rushing yards and 75 receiving yards in the same game. The Bucs finished with 416 yards of total offense. They had 513 yards against New Orleans last Sunday and 463 yards against Kansas City the previous week before playing the Saints. That marks the first time in franchise history that the Bucs have had three straight games with over 400 yards of total offense. The Buccaneers won their sixth straight meeting against the Minnesota Vikings.

=== Week 9: at Oakland Raiders ===
Week Nine: Tampa Bay Buccaneers at Oakland Raiders – Game summary

Quarter	1	2	3	4	Total
Buccaneers	0	7	21	14	42
Raiders	3	7	0	22	32

at O.co Coliseum, Oakland, California

- Date: Sunday November 4, 2012
- Game time: 4:05 p.m. EST/1:05 p.m. PST
- Game weather: 71 °F (22 °C), sunny
- Game attendance: 52,055
- Referee: Walt Anderson
- TV announcers (Fox): Dick Stockton, John Lynch and Jennifer Hale

Game information

First quarter

- OAK – Sebastian Janikowski 29-yard field goal, 0:45. Raiders 3–0. Drive: 10 plays, 33 yards, 4:08.

Second quarter

- TB – Vincent Jackson 20-yard pass from Josh Freeman (Connor Barth kick), 12:54. Buccaneers 7–3. Drive: 6 plays, 80 yards, 2:51.
- OAK – Rod Streater 25-yard pass from Carson Palmer (Sebastian Janikowski kick), 1:20. Raiders 10–7. Drive: 4 plays, 71 yards, 0:22.

Third quarter

- TB – Doug Martin 45-yard run (Connor Barth kick), 12:09. Buccaneers 14–10. Drive: 6 plays, 80 yards, 2:51.
- TB – Mike Williams 4-yard pass from Josh Freeman (Connor Barth kick), 7:12. Buccaneers 21–10. Drive: 7 plays, 60 yards, 3:26.
- TB – Doug Martin 67-yard run (Connor Barth kick), 2:15. Buccaneers 28–10. Drive: 2 plays, 68 yards, 0:52.

Fourth quarter

- OAK – Brandon Myers 4-yard pass from Carson Palmer (Sebastian Janikowski kick), 14:11. Buccaneers 28–17. Drive: 9 plays, 80 yards, 3:04.
- TB – Doug Martin 70-yard run (Connor Barth kick), 13:51. Buccaneers 35–17. Drive: 1 play, 70 yards, 0:20.
- OAK – Brandon Myers 1-yard pass from Carson Palmer (Sebastian Janikowski kick), 9:48. Buccaneers 35–24. Drive: 7 plays, 80 yards, 4:03.
- OAK – Marcel Reece 13-yard pass from Carson Palmer (Carson Palmer-Juron Criner pass), 3:51. Buccaneers 35–32. Drive: 11 plays, 65 yards, 3:52.
- TB – Doug Martin 1-yard run (Connor Barth kick), 1:49. Buccaneers 42–32. Drive: 3 plays, 22 yards, 0:38.

Top passers

- TB – Josh Freeman – 18/30, 247 yards, 2 TD
- OAK – Carson Palmer – 39/61, 414 yards, 4 TD, 3 INT

Top rushers

- TB – Doug Martin – 25 rushes, 251 yards, 4 TD
- OAK – Darren McFadden – 7 rushes, 17 yards

Top receivers

- TB – Vincent Jackson – 2 receptions, 84 yards, TD
- OAK – Marcel Reece – 8 receptions, 95 yards, TD

Doug Martin rushed for 251 yards and four touchdowns. Martin became the first player in NFL history to have 250+ rushing yards and four touchdowns in a single game. He also became the first player in NFL history to have rushing touchdowns of 70+, 65+, and 45+ yards in the same game. Martin's 251 yards rushing broke the single-game franchise record previously held by James Wilder Sr. (219) from 1983. Martin had 272 total scrimmage yards, including an additional 21-yard receiving. Martin's 251 rushing yards was tied for third-most by a rookie in NFL history. Adrian Peterson (296 yards) in 2007 and DeMarco Murray (253) in 2011 were the only rookies to rush for more yards in a game. Martin's four rushing touchdowns was also a new franchise record.

Josh Freeman passed for 247 yards and two touchdowns. He is the third quarterback in franchise history to throw for a touchdown pass in each of the first eight games of the season. Brad Johnson (2003) and Doug Williams (1979) were the other two. Tampa Bay's 515 yards from offense ranked second on the team's all-time list. The record was 573 in a 1980 game against Minnesota. LaVonte David set a Tampa Bay single-game rookie record with 16 tackles. Ahmad Black and E. J. Biggers both had an interception and a forced fumble in the game. Leonard Johnson had another interception, which was two consecutive games with interceptions. DaQuan Bowers and Michael Bennett each had a sack. The Buccaneers added six tackles for a loss which remains best in the NFL. The Tampa Bay defense held the Raiders rushing offense to 22 total rushing yards. This was the fourth game of the season in which the Buccaneers scored more than 30 points in a single game (Giants 34, Chiefs 38, Vikings 36, and Raiders 42). The victory was the first time Tampa Bay defeated the Raiders in Oakland.

=== Week 10: vs. San Diego Chargers ===
Week Ten: San Diego Chargers at Tampa Bay Buccaneers – Game summary

Quarter	1	2	3	4	Total
Chargers	14	7	0	3	24
Buccaneers	7	10	7	10	34

at Raymond James Stadium, Tampa, Florida

- Date: Sunday November 11, 2012
- Game time: 1:00 p.m. EST
- Game weather: 80 °F (27 °C), cloudy
- Game attendance: 54,813 (blacked out locally)
- Referee: Bill Vinovich
- TV announcers (CBS): Kevin Harlan and Solomon Wilcots (blacked out locally)

Game information

First quarter

- SD – Danario Alexander 80-yard pass from Philip Rivers (Nick Novak kick), 13:57. Chargers 7–0. Drive: 3 plays, 80 yards, 1:03.
- TB – Dallas Clark 3-yard pass from Josh Freeman (Connor Barth kick), 8:57. Tied 7–7. Drive: 9 plays, 80 yards, 5:00.
- SD – Antonio Gates 13-yard pass from Philip Rivers (Nick Novak kick), 4:19. Chargers 14–7. Drive: 7 plays, 80 yards, 4:38.

Second quarter

- TB – Connor Barth 40-yard field goal, 12:52. Chargers 14–10. Drive: 7 plays, 58 yards, 3:09.
- TB – Adam Hayward 29-yard return of blocked punt (Connor Barth kick), 8:55. Buccaneers 17–14.
- SD – Malcom Floyd 3-yard pass from Philip Rivers (Nick Novak kick), 0:27. Chargers 21–17. Drive: 14 plays, 80 yards, 8:28.

Third quarter

- TB – Tiquan Underwood 15-yard pass from Josh Freeman (Connor Barth kick), 4:07. Buccaneers 24–21. Drive: 6 plays, 59 yards, 3:32.

Fourth quarter

- TB – Leonard Johnson 83-yard interception return (Connor Barth kick), 13:22. Buccaneers 31–21.
- SD – Nick Novak 34-yard field goal, 7:02. Buccaneers 31–24. Drive: 11 plays, 64 yards, 6:20.
- TB – Connor Barth 45-yard field goal, 1:07. Buccaneers 34–24. Drive: 6 plays, 18 yards, 2:02.

Top passers

- SD – Philip Rivers – 29/37, 337 yards, 3 TD, 2 INT
- TB – Josh Freeman – 14/20, 210 yards, 2 TD

Top rushers

- SD – Ryan Mathews – 17 rushes, 54 yards
- TB – Doug Martin – 19 rushes, 68 yards

Top receivers

- SD – Danario Alexander – 5 receptions, 134 yards, TD
- TB – Mike Williams – 2 receptions, 64 yards

The Buccaneers scored a touchdown on offense, defense, and special teams. The last time the Buccaneers did this was on October 18, 2009, home against the Carolina Panthers when Cadillac Williams scored an offensive touchdown, Tanard Jackson returned an interception for a touchdown, and Sammie Stroughter returned a kick-off return for a touchdown. Josh Freeman threw for 210 yards and 2 touchdowns. Freeman completed 14 passes out 20 attempts. Freeman had another consecutive game without throwing an interception. Dallas Clark caught a three-yard touchdown. Tiquan Underwood caught a 15-yard touchdown. Rookie Leonard Johnson scored an 83-yard interception touchdown. This is the third consecutive game that Leonard Johnson had an interception. Adam Hayward recovered and returned a 29-yard touchdown of a punt that Dekoda Watson blocked. Daniel Te'o-Nesheim and Mason Foster each had a sack. LeQuan Lewis had an interception as well. Doug Martin had 68 rushing yards and 51 receiving yards which combined for a total of 119 total yards of offense. With this performance Martin broke the NFL record for most yards from scrimmage (605) in a 3-game span set by Walter Payton in 1977 (593). Rookie Lavonte David led the team in tackles with 13. Connor Barth scored 2 field goals. The Tampa Bay defense allowed San Diego to rush over 103 yards on offense. The Chargers were the third team this season to rush over 100 yards on the Tampa Bay defense. The Redskins and Vikings were the other two teams to do so.

=== Week 11: at Carolina Panthers ===
Week Eleven: Tampa Bay Buccaneers at Carolina Panthers – Game summary

Quarter	1	2	3	4	OT	Total
Buccaneers	10	0	0	11	6	27
Panthers	7	7	0	7	0	21

at Bank of America Stadium, Charlotte, North Carolina

- Date: Sunday November 18, 2012
- Game time: 1:00 p.m. EST
- Game weather: 53 °F (12 °C), cloudy
- Game attendance: 72,603
- Referee: Bill Leavy
- TV announcers (Fox): Chris Myers, Tim Ryan and Jaime Maggio

Game information

First quarter

- TB – Nate Byham 3-yard pass from Josh Freeman (Connor Barth kick), 8:46. Buccaneers 7–0. Drive: 6 plays, 29 yards, 3:33.
- TB – Connor Barth 51-yard field goal, 5:21. Buccaneers 10–0. Drive: 5 plays, 19 yards, 2:19.
- CAR – Captain Munnerlyn 74-yard interception return (Justin Medlock kick), 0:35. Buccaneers 10–7.

Second quarter

- CAR – Jonathan Stewart 1-yard run (Justin Medlock kick), 8:53. Panthers 14–10. Drive: 8 plays, 77 yards, 4:09.

Third quarter

- No scoring plays.

Fourth quarter

- CAR – Brandon LaFell 29-yard pass from Cam Newton (Justin Medlock kick), 6:00. Panthers 21–10. Drive: 7 plays, 80 yards, 4:34.
- TB – Connor Barth 40-yard field goal, 4:03. Panthers 21–13. Drive: 10 plays, 58 yards, 1:57.
- TB – Vincent Jackson 24-yard pass from Josh Freeman (Josh Freeman-Vincent Jackson pass), 0:12. Tied 21–21. Drive: 7 plays, 80 yards, 0:50.

Overtime

- TB – Dallas Clark 15-yard pass from Josh Freeman, 10:40. Buccaneers 27–21. Drive: 8 plays, 80 yards, 4:20.

Top passers

- TB – Josh Freeman – 25/46, 248 yards, 3 TD, 2 INT
- CAR – Cam Newton – 16/29, 252 yards, TD

Top rushers

- TB – Doug Martin – 24 rushes, 138 yards
- CAR – Jonathan Stewart – 15 rushes, 43 yards, TD

Top receivers

- TB – Vincent Jackson – 6 receptions, 94 yards, TD
- CAR – Brandon LaFell – 5 receptions, 93 yards, TD

The Tampa Bay Buccaneers walked out of Bank of America Stadium with perhaps one of the most impressive comeback wins in their franchise history. Quarterback Josh Freeman threw for 248 yards and 3 touchdowns. Freeman threw 2 interceptions in this game as well. Nate Byham caught a 3-yard pass for a touchdown for the Bucs in the first quarter. Connor Barth scored 2 field goals in this game. Late in the fourth quarter, Vincent Jackson caught a 24-yard pass for a touchdown with 12 seconds left. Jackson caught the two-point conversion to tie the game. Dallas Clark caught a 15-yard pass for a touchdown that won the game for the Buccaneers in overtime. Doug Martin rushed for 138 yards. Martin surpassed 1,000 rushing yards in 10 games as a rookie. Michael Bennett and Da'Quan Bowers each registered a sack. The Tampa Bay defense held Carolina to 97 rushing yards. The Buccaneers swept their division rival Carolina Panthers this season.

=== Week 12: vs. Atlanta Falcons ===
Week Twelve: Atlanta Falcons at Tampa Bay Buccaneers – Game summary

Quarter	1	2	3	4	Total
Falcons	3	7	7	7	24
Buccaneers	7	3	3	10	23

at Raymond James Stadium, Tampa, Florida

- Date: Sunday November 25, 2012
- Game time: 1:00 p.m. EST
- Game weather: 65 °F (18 °C), sunny
- Game attendance: 54,400
- Referee: Jeff Triplette
- TV announcers (Fox): Thom Brennaman, Charles Davis and Laura Okmin (blacked out locally)

Game information

First quarter

- ATL – Matt Bryant 31-yard field goal, 7:38. Falcons 3–0. Drive: 12 plays, 67 yards, 7:22.
- TB – Doug Martin 1-yard run (Connor Barth kick), 1:12. Buccaneers 7–3. Drive: 10 plays, 81 yards, 6:26.

Second quarter

- ATL – Jacquizz Rodgers 5-yard run (Matt Bryant kick), 10:25. Falcons 10–7. Drive: 10 plays, 75 yards, 5:47.
- TB – Connor Barth 22-yard field goal, 3:37. Tied 10–10. Drive: 5 plays, 27 yards, 2:10.

Third quarter

- TB – Connor Barth 42-yard field goal, 8:37. Buccaneers 13–10. Drive: 13 plays, 62 yards, 6:23.
- ATL – Julio Jones 80-yard pass from Matt Ryan (Matt Bryant kick), 8:26. Falcons 17–13. Drive: 1 play, 80 yards, 0:11.

Fourth quarter

- TB – Doug Martin 1-yard run (Connor Barth kick), 14:56. Buccaneers 20–17. Drive: 9 plays, 82 yards, 5:16.
- TB – Connor Barth 48-yard field goal, 10:28. Buccaneers 23–17. Drive: 4 plays, 6 yards, 0:55.
- ATL – Michael Turner 3-yard run (Matt Bryant kick), 7:55. Falcons 24–23. Drive: 6 plays, 64 yards, 2:33.

Top passers

- ATL – Matt Ryan – 26/32, 353 yards, TD
- TB – Josh Freeman – 19/30, 256 yards

Top rushers

- ATL – Jacquizz Rodgers – 10 rushes, 49 yards, TD
- TB – Doug Martin – 21 rushes, 50 yards, 2 TD

Top receivers

- ATL – Julio Jones – 6 receptions, 147 yards, TD
- TB – Vincent Jackson – 5 receptions, 96 yards

Josh Freeman threw for 256 yards and didn't throw an interception. Doug Martin had 50 rushing yards, but scored the only 2 offensive touchdowns for the Buccaneers. Ronde Barber intercepted Matt Ryan in the second quarter, his 47th career interceptions. Connor Barth made 3 out of 4 field goal attempts. Barth hit from 22, 42 and 48 yards out, missing a 56-yard try in the 4th quarter. E. J. Biggers sacked and forced Matt Ryan to fumble in the 4th quarter in which Gerald McCoy recovered. Biggers had the only sack for the Buccaneers defense. Defensively, Lavonte David again led the Buccaneers in tackles with eight total tackles. The Tampa Bay defense held the Falcons to only 79 rushing yards.

=== Week 13: at Denver Broncos ===
Week Thirteen: Tampa Bay Buccaneers at Denver Broncos – Game summary

Quarter	1	2	3	4	Total
Buccaneers	10	0	0	13	23
Broncos	7	0	21	3	31

at Sports Authority Field at Mile High, Denver, Colorado

- Date: Sunday December 2, 2012
- Game time: 4:05 p.m. EST/2:05 p.m. MST
- Game weather: 64 °F (18 °C), partly cloudy
- Game attendance: 76,432
- Referee: Terry McAulay
- TV announcers (Fox): Dick Stockton, John Lynch and Jennifer Hale

Game information

First quarter

- DEN – Mitch Unrein 1-yard pass from Peyton Manning (Matt Prater kick), 8:47. Broncos 7–0. Drive: 10 plays, 65 yards, 4:00.
- TB – Connor Barth 31-yard field goal, 4:41. Broncos 7–3. Drive: 9 plays, 66 yards, 4:06.
- TB – Dallas Clark 11-yard pass from Josh Freeman (Connor Barth kick), 0:14. Buccaneers 10–7. Drive: 5 plays, 70 yards, 2:31.

Second quarter

- DEN – Demaryius Thomas 8-yard pass from Peyton Manning (Matt Prater kick), 9:21. Broncos 14–10. Drive: 4 plays, 52 yards, 1:22.
- DEN – Demaryius Thomas 10-yard pass from Peyton Manning (Matt Prater kick), 4:39. Broncos 21–10. Drive: 7 plays, 57 yards, 3:23.
- DEN – Von Miller 26-yard interception return (Matt Prater kick), 3:56. Broncos 28–10.

Third quarter

- No scoring plays.

Fourth quarter

- TB – Connor Barth 50-yard field goal, 14:55. Broncos 28–13. Drive: 6 plays, 16 yards, 2:11.
- DEN – Matt Prater 31-yard field goal, 7:36. Broncos 31–13. Drive: 14 plays, 68 yards, 7:19.
- TB – Connor Barth 55-yard field goal, 3:23. Broncos 31–16. Drive: 5 plays, 26 yards, 1:14.
- TB – Mike Williams 5-yard pass from Josh Freeman (Connor Barth kick), 2:33. Broncos 31–23. Drive: 4 plays, 47 yards, 0:24.

Top passers

- TB – Josh Freeman – 18/39, 242 yards, 2 TD, INT
- DEN – Peyton Manning – 27/38, 242 yards, 3 TD, INT

Top rushers

- TB – Doug Martin – 18 rushes, 56 yards
- DEN – Knowshon Moreno – 20 rushes, 69 yards

Top receivers

- TB – Mike Williams – 6 receptions, 93 yards, TD
- DEN – Demaryius Thomas – 8 receptions, 99 yards, 2 TD

Josh Freeman threw for 242 yards and 2 touchdowns. Freeman threw an interception to Von Miller in the third quarter, in which he ran it back for a touchdown. Freeman fumbled once in which Von Miller forced. Connor Barth scored 3 field goals. Barth scored from 31, 50, and 55 yards. Doug Martin rushed for only 56 yards. Dallas Clark caught an 11-yard passing touchdown in the first quarter. Mike Williams caught a 5-yard passing touchdown in the fourth quarter. Rookie linebacker Lavonte David led the team once again in tackles and also intercepted Peyton Manning in the third quarter. The Tampa Bay defense held Denver to 91 rushing yards.

=== Week 14: vs. Philadelphia Eagles ===
Week Fourteen: Philadelphia Eagles at Tampa Bay Buccaneers – Game summary

Quarter	1	2	3	4	Total
Eagles	0	10	0	13	23
Buccaneers	0	0	7	14	21

at Raymond James Stadium, Tampa, Florida

- Date: Sunday December 9, 2012
- Game time: 1:00 p.m. EST
- Game weather: 69 °F (21 °C), cloudy
- Game attendance: 64,941
- Referee: Ron Winter
- TV announcers (Fox): Dick Stockton, John Lynch and Jennifer Hale

Game information

First quarter

- No scoring plays.

Second quarter

- PHI – Alex Henery 28-yard field goal, 7:13. Eagles 3–0. Drive: 9 plays, 33 yards, 2:49.
- PHI – Nick Foles 10-yard run (Alex Henery kick), 1:40. Eagles 10–0. Drive: 7 plays, 80 yards, 2:57.

Third quarter

- TB – Mike Williams 1-yard pass from Josh Freeman (Connor Barth kick), 11:35. Eagles 10–7. Drive: 3 plays, 5 yards, 0:39.

Fourth quarter

- TB – Vincent Jackson 13-yard pass from Josh Freeman (Connor Barth kick), 14:26. Buccaneers 14–10. Drive: 9 plays, 77 yards, 3:48.
- TB – Doug Martin 4-yard run (Connor Barth kick), 7:21. Buccaneers 21–10. Drive: 11 plays, 75 yards, 5:57.
- PHI – Clay Harbor 11-yard pass from Nick Foles (pass failed), 3:55. Buccaneers 21–16. Drive: 8 plays, 72 yards, 3:26.
- PHI – Jeremy Maclin 1-yard pass from Nick Foles (Alex Henery kick), 0:00. Eagles 23–21. Drive: 13 plays, 64 yards, 2:44.

Top passers

- PHI – Nick Foles – 32/51, 381 yards, 2 TD
- TB – Josh Freeman – 14/34, 189 yards, 2 TD

Top rushers

- PHI – Nick Foles – 3 rushes, 27 yards
- TB – Doug Martin – 28 rushes, 128 yards, TD

Top receivers

- PHI – Jason Avant – 7 receptions, 133 yards
- TB – Vincent Jackson – 6 receptions, 131 yards, TD

Tampa Bay entered the day one game behind the #6 seed in the wild card race. The franchise celebrated the tenth anniversary of Super Bowl XXXVII, with former coach Jon Gruden and many players from the 2002 team in attendance. Tampa Bay took a 21–10 lead with 7:21 left in regulation. But Nick Foles rallied the Eagles to victory. On a 4th & 5 with 16 seconds to go, Foles found Jason Avant for a 22-yard pass, but he was tackled at the one yard line. Foles hurried up to the line of scrimmage and spiked the ball to stop the clock with 2 seconds left. On the last play of the game, Jeremy Maclin caught a 1-yard touchdown pass as time expired, and Eagles escaped with the victory.

=== Week 15: at New Orleans Saints ===
Week Fifteen: Tampa Bay Buccaneers at New Orleans Saints – Game summary

Quarter	1	2	3	4	Total
Buccaneers	0	0	0	0	0
Saints	7	17	7	10	41

at Mercedes-Benz Superdome, New Orleans, Louisiana

- Date: Sunday December 16, 2012
- Game time: 1:00 p.m. EST/12:00 p.m. CST
- Game weather: Played indoors (dome stadium)
- Game attendance: 73,096
- Referee: Mike Carey
- TV announcers (Fox): Thom Brennaman, Brian Billick and Laura Okmin

Game information

First quarter

- NO – David Thomas 9-yard pass from Drew Brees (Garrett Hartley kick), 11:12. Saints 7–0. Drive: 7 plays, 74 yards, 3:48.

Second quarter

- NO – Garrett Hartley 25-yard field goal, 13:23. Saints 10–0. Drive: 11 plays, 74 yards, 5:23.
- NO – Darren Sproles 2-yard pass from Drew Brees (Garrett Hartley kick), 4:57. Saints 17–0. Drive: 8 plays, 51 yards, 4:26.
- NO – Lance Moore 7-yard pass from Drew Brees (Garrett Hartley kick), 0:09. Saints 24–0. Drive: 5 plays, 38 yards, 0:55.

Third quarter

- NO – Joe Morgan 34-yard pass from Drew Brees (Garrett Hartley kick), 9:05. Saints 31–0. Drive: 8 plays, 92 yards, 4:24.

Fourth quarter

- NO – Garrett Hartley 36-yard field goal, 8:09. Saints 34–0. Drive: 8 plays, 63 yards, 2:46.
- NO – Mark Ingram 11-yard run (Garrett Hartley kick), 4:54. Saints 41–0. Drive: 3 plays, 43 yards, 1:32.

Top passers

- TB – Josh Freeman – 26/47, 279 yards, 4 INT
- NO – Drew Brees – 26/39, 307 yards, 4 TD

Top rushers

- TB – LeGarrette Blount – 4 rushes, 25 yards
- NO – Mark Ingram – 14 rushes, 90 yards, TD

Top receivers

- TB – Vincent Jackson – 6 receptions, 81 yards
- NO – Jimmy Graham – 5 receptions, 69 yards

Josh Freeman threw for 279 yards, no touchdowns, and threw 4 interceptions. Doug Martin rushed for a season low 16 yards. On defense, Daquan Bowers had the only sack. Mark Barron led the team in tackles. The Tampa Bay defense allowed the Saints to rush for 149 yards. The Buccaneers were shut out throughout the entire game. The last shut out the Buccaneers had was during week 3 of the 2009 season, when the New York Giants beat the Buccaneers 24–0. This is also the Buccaneers' largest loss to the Saints in franchise history. More importantly the loss not only eliminated the Buccaneers from playoff contention, but also was one of three shutouts that week, the other two being a New York Giants losing 34–0 to the Atlanta Falcons and the Kansas City Chiefs suffering a 15–0 loss to the Oakland Raiders.

=== Week 16: vs. St. Louis Rams ===
Week Sixteen: St. Louis Rams at Tampa Bay Buccaneers – Game summary

Quarter	1	2	3	4	Total
Rams	0	14	14	0	28
Buccaneers	3	3	7	0	13

at Raymond James Stadium, Tampa, Florida

- Date: Sunday December 23, 2012
- Game time: 1:00 p.m. EST
- Game weather: 59 °F (15 °C), cloudy
- Game attendance: 51,535
- Referee: Scott Green
- TV announcers (Fox): Ron Pitts, Mike Martz and Krista Voda (blacked out locally)

Game information

First quarter

- TB – Connor Barth 29-yard field goal, 5:22. Buccaneers 3–0. Drive: 15 plays, 69 yards, 9:38.

Second quarter

- STL – Janoris Jenkins 41-yard interception return (Greg Zuerlein kick), 11:46. Rams 7–3.
- TB – Connor Barth 49-yard field goal, 5:56. Rams 7–6. Drive: 11 plays, 49 yards, 5:50.
- STL – Steven Jackson 5-yard run (Greg Zuerlein kick), 0:32. Rams 14–6. Drive: 9 plays, 65 yards, 2:58.

Third quarter

- STL – Lance Kendricks 80-yard pass from Sam Bradford (Greg Zuerlein kick), 14:46. Rams 21–6. Drive: 1 play, 80 yards, 0:14.
- STL – Austin Pettis 5-yard pass from Sam Bradford (Greg Zuerlein kick), 10:47. Rams 28–6. Drive: 6 plays, 30 yards, 3:11.
- TB – Mike Williams 61-yard pass from Josh Freeman (Connor Barth kick), 8:50. Rams 28–13. Drive: 4 plays, 80 yards, 1:57.

Fourth quarter

- No scoring plays.

Top passers

- STL – Sam Bradford – 13/27, 196 yards, 2 TD, INT
- TB – Josh Freeman – 30/54, 372 yards, TD, 4 INT

Top rushers

- STL – Steven Jackson – 19 rushes, 81 yards, TD
- TB – Doug Martin – 18 rushes, 62 yards

Top receivers

- STL – Lance Kendricks – 4 receptions, 119 yards, TD
- TB – Mike Williams – 7 receptions, 132 yards, TD

Josh Freeman threw for 372 yards, one touchdown, and four interceptions. Doug Martin rushed for 62 yards. Connor Barth scored two field goals throughout the game. Barth scored from 29 and 49 yards. Mike Williams scored the only touchdown in the third quarter in which he caught a pass for 61 yards. Mike Williams and Vicent Jackson both had 100 receiving yards throughout the game. On defense, Lavonte David led the team in tackles with 9 total tackles. Leonard Johnson forced a fumble. Danny Grorer had an interception. The Tampa Bay defense held the Rams offense to only 89 total rushing yards.

=== Week 17: at Atlanta Falcons ===
Week Seventeen: Tampa Bay Buccaneers at Atlanta Falcons – Game summary

Quarter	1	2	3	4	Total
Buccaneers	3	10	9	0	22
Falcons	3	0	7	7	17

at Georgia Dome, Atlanta

- Date: Sunday December 30, 2012
- Game time: 1:00 p.m. EST
- Game weather: Played indoors (dome stadium)
- Game attendance: 69,644
- Referee: Carl Cheffers
- TV announcers (Fox): Dick Stockton, John Lynch and Jennifer Hale

Game information

First quarter

- TB – Connor Barth 48-yard field goal, 6:24. Buccaneers 3–0. Drive: 9 plays, 60 yards, 4:25.
- ATL – Matt Bryant 28-yard field goal, 2:24. Tied 3–3. Drive: 9 plays, 62 yards, 4:00.

Second quarter

- TB – Mike Williams 8-yard pass from Josh Freeman (Connor Barth kick), 8:43. Buccaneers 10–3. Drive: 7 plays, 64 yards, 3:55.
- TB – Connor Barth 22-yard field goal, 3:03. Buccaneers 13–3. Drive: 7 plays, 22 yards, 3:03.

Third quarter

- TB – Connor Barth 42-yard field goal, 10:47. Buccaneers 16–3. Drive: 11 plays, 56 yards, 4:13.
- ATL – Michael Turner 17-yard run (Matt Bryant kick), 3:45. Buccaneers 16–10. Drive: 2 plays, 21 yards, 0:41.
- TB – Doug Martin 40-yard run (pass failed), 1:43. Buccaneers 22–10. Drive: 4 plays, 80 yards, 2:02.

Fourth quarter

- ATL – Harry Douglas 7-yard pass from Matt Ryan (Matt Bryant kick), 7:02. Buccaneers 22–17. Drive: 9 plays, 52 yards, 4:21.

Top passers

- TB – Josh Freeman – 19/35, 222 yards, TD, INT
- ATL – Matt Ryan – 28/44, 238 yards, TD

Top rushers

- TB – Doug Martin – 28 rushes, 142 yards, TD
- ATL – Jacquizz Rodgers – 5 rushes, 28 yards

Top receivers

- TB – Mike Williams – 6 receptions, 65 yards, TD
- ATL – Julio Jones – 3 receptions, 56 yards

Josh Freeman threw for 222 yards, a touchdown, and an interception. Freeman is the first ever quarterback in franchise history to throw for 4,000 yards in a season. Freeman ended the season with 27 passing touchdowns in a season which was another record in franchise history. Doug Martin rushed for 142 yards. Martin scored a 40-yard rushing touchdown in the third quarter. Mike Williams caught an 8-yard pass from Freeman in the second quarter. Connor Barth scored 3 field goals throughout the game. Barth scored from 22, 42, and 48 yards. On defense, Mason Foster led the team in tackles with 11 total tackles. Lavonte David had a sack and Daniel Te'o-Neshiem had a sack as well in the game. Dekoda Watson blocked a punt in the second quarter. The Tampa Bay defense held the Falcons offense to only 65 rushing yards. The Bucs finished 7–9 with the win, improving on their 4–12 record from 2011.

=== Standings ===
NFC South
	W	L	T	PCT	DIV	CONF	PF	PA	STK
^{(1)} Atlanta Falcons	13	3	0	.813	3–3	9–3	419	299	L1
Carolina Panthers	7	9	0	.438	3–3	5–7	357	363	W4
New Orleans Saints	7	9	0	.438	3–3	5–7	461	454	L1
Tampa Bay Buccaneers	7	9	0	.438	3–3	4–8	389	394	W1

== Awards ==
- Week 1: Ronde Barber was named NFC Defensive Player of the Week.
- Week 8: Doug Martin was named NFL Ground Player of the Week.
- October: Doug Martin was named NFL Offensive Rookie of the Month.
- Week 9: Doug Martin
  - Named NFC Offensive Player of the Week.
  - Named NFL Ground Player of the Week.
  - Named NFL Rookie of the Week.
- Week 11: Doug Martin was named NFL Ground Player of the Week.
- November: Lavonte David was named NFL Defensive Rookie of the Month.
- November: Dekoda Watson was named NFC Special Teams Player of the Month.

== Staff ==
2012 Tampa Bay Buccaneers staff
Front office: Owner/president – Malcolm Glazer; Co-chairman – Bryan Glazer; Co-chairman – Edward Glazer; Co-chairman – Joel Glazer; General manager – Mark Dominik; Director of player personnel – Dennis Hickey; Coordinator of pro scouting – Shelton Quarles; Director of college scouting – Eric Stokes; Coordinator of football administration – Mike Greenberg; Director of football operations – Kevin MacConnell; Special assistant to the head coach – Butch Davis; Head coaches: Head coach – Greg Schiano; Offensive coaches: Offensive coordinator – Mike Sullivan; Senior offensive assistant – Jimmy Raye; Quarterbacks – Ron Turner; Running backs – Earnest Byner; Wide receivers – P. J. Fleck; Tight ends – Brian Angelichio; Offensive line – Bob Bostad; Assistant offensive line – Steve Loney; Offensive assistant – Ben McDaniels	Defensive coaches: Defensive coordinator – Bill Sheridan; Defensive line – Randy Melvin; Defensive front seven – Bryan Cox; Linebackers – Bob Fraser; Defensive backs – Ron Cooper; Assistant defensive backs – Jeff Hafley; Defensive assistant – Andrew Aurich; Defensive assistant – Tem Lukabu; Special teams coaches: Special teams coordinator – Bob Ligashesky; Assistant special teams – Phil Galiano; Strength and conditioning: Head strength and conditioning – Jay Butler; Assistant strength and conditioning – Joe Vaughn

== Final roster ==
2012 Tampa Bay Buccaneers roster
Quarterbacks (QB): 5 Josh Freeman; 6 Dan Orlovsky; Running backs (RB): 27 LeGarrette Blount; 41 Erik Lorig FB; 22 Doug Martin; 34 Michael Smith; 28 DJ Ware; Wide receivers (WR): 89 David Douglas; 83 Vincent Jackson; 80 Chris Owusu; 12 Roscoe Parrish; 11 Tiquan Underwood; 19 Mike Williams; Tight ends (TE): 82 Nate Byham; 44 Dallas Clark; 88 Luke Stocker	Offensive linemen (OL): 73 Roger Allen G; 69 Demar Dotson T; 68 Derek Hardman G; 62 Ted Larsen C; 79 Jamon Meredith G; 70 Donald Penn T; 74 Cody Wallace C/G; 76 Jeremy Zuttah G/C; Defensive linemen (DL): 71 Michael Bennett DE; 91 Da'Quan Bowers DE; 95 Gary Gibson DT; 96 Corvey Irvin DT; 78 Lazarius Levingston DE; 97 Matthew Masifilo DT; 93 Gerald McCoy DT; 90 Roy Miller DT; 92 Markus White DE	Linebackers (LB): 51 Jacob Cutrera OLB; 54 Lavonte David OLB; 59 Mason Foster MLB; 53 Najee Goode MLB; 57 Adam Hayward OLB; 50 Daniel Te'o-Nesheim OLB; 56 Dekoda Watson OLB; Defensive backs (DB): 20 Ronde Barber FS; 24 Mark Barron SS; 31 E. J. Biggers CB; 43 Ahmad Black SS; 26 Anthony Gaitor CB; 36 Danny Gorrer CB; 29 Leonard Johnson CB; 33 Brandon McDonald CB; 37 Keith Tandy FS; 21 Eric Wright CB; Special teams (ST): 10 Connor Barth K; 48 Andrew Economos LS; 9 Michael Koenen P	Practice squad: 38 Sean Baker S; 81 Drake Dunsmore TE (IR); 49 Joe Holland LB; 67 Ernest Owusu DE; 60 Mike Remmers T; 39 James Rogers CB; 45 Nick Saenz S; 85 Jabin Sambrano WR; 2 Adam Weber QB; Reserve: 17 Arrelious Benn WR (IR); 58 Quincy Black OLB (IR); 94 Adrian Clayborn DE (IR); 35 Cody Grimm FS (IR); 75 Davin Joseph G (IR); 23 Myron Lewis CB (IR); 98 Aaron Morgan OLB (IR); 77 Carl Nicks G (IR); 86 Danny Noble TE (IR); 18 Sammie Stroughter WR (IR); 65 Jeremy Trueblood T (IR); 72 Desmond Wynn G/T (IR); Rookies in italics 53 active, 13 reserve, 8 practice squad
