= Avram Glazer =

American businessman (born 1960)

- Born: Avram A. Glazer; October 19, 1960 (age 66); Rochester, New York, U.S.
- Education: Washington University in St. Louis (BSBA); American University (JD)
- Known for: Co-owner of the Tampa Bay Buccaneers, Co-chairman of Manchester United
- Spouse: Jill Henkin
- Parent(s): Linda and Malcolm Glazer
- Family: Bryan Glazer (brother); Joel Glazer (brother)
- Awards: Sigma Alpha Mu Man Of The Year Award, 2023

Avram A. Glazer (born October 19, 1960) is an American businessman. He is a member of the Glazer family (a son of Malcolm Glazer), who own the Tampa Bay Buccaneers of the National Football League (NFL) and hold a majority ownership stake in English Premier League club Manchester United.

== Early life and education ==
Avram A. Glazer was born on October 6, 1960, in Rochester, New York. His father was Malcolm Glazer and his mother is Linda. He has four brothers and one sister: Kevin E. Glazer; Bryan Glazer; Joel Glazer; Darcie S. Glazer Kassewitz; and Edward S. Glazer. Glazer grew up in Rochester, New York, attended Pittsford Mendon High School and was the Junior Achievement Outstanding Young Businessman Of The Year in 1978. Glazer received his Bachelor of Science in Business Administration from Washington University in St. Louis in 1982 and graduated from the American University Washington College of Law in 1985. He also studied at the Emory University School of Law, Peking University and Fudan University in Shanghai.

== Career ==
Since 2005, Glazer has been the Executive Co-Chairman of Manchester United. Manchester United is the world's most popular sports team with 1.1 billion fans. During Glazer's tenure, Manchester United have won 25 trophies which include: five Premier League titles (2007, 2008, 2009, 2011 and 2013), the Champions League title (2008), five League Cups (2006, 2009, 2010, 2017, 2023), two FA Cups (2016, 2024), the FIFA Club World Cup (2008), six FA Community Shield's (2007, 2008, 2010, 2011, 2013, 2016), the Europa League title (2017), the Woman's Championship (2019), the Woman's FA Cup (2024) and two FA Youth Cups (2011, 2022). Manchester United was one of 12 clubs involved in the 2021 attempt to establish a European Super League.

Avram Glazer has been an owner of the NFL's Tampa Bay Buccaneers since 1995. The Buccaneers have won two Super Bowls (Super Bowl XXXVII and Super Bowl LV) during the Glazers' tenure as owners.

In December 2023, Manchester United announced that as a result of its strategic review process, Sir Jim Ratcliffe would purchase a 25% ownership stake in Manchester United, valuing the club at $6.3 billion.

From 1995 until 2009, he was also the former chairman and chief executive officer of Zapata Corporation, the energy company founded by President George H.W. Bush. He was also formerly chairman and chief executive officer of both Safety Components International and Omega Protein Corporation. He was formerly a member of the board of directors of Specialty Equipment Corporation.

Glazer owns the Desert Vipers cricket club in Dubai.

In addition to sports, Avram Glazer spearheaded the launch of OneFlorida Bank and has interests in Zebra Valley, a media-focused venture in the Middle East, showcasing his growing footprint beyond sports.

== Philanthropy ==
Glazer helped fund the Glazer Children's Museum in Tampa, Florida. Glazer and his wife Jill also made possible the Glazer Family Club at Tulane University's Yulman Stadium. Glazer received the Distinguished Alumni award in 2013 from Washington University in St. Louis, where he is also a member of the board of trustees. Glazer was recognized with the Sigma Alpha Mu Man Of The Year Award in 2023. Avram Glazer is a member of the Board of the Glazer Vision Foundation. The couple founded Glazer Hall, a multi-purpose performing arts center in Palm Beach, Florida in 2025.

== Personal life ==
Glazer is married to Jill Henkin Glazer, a Tulane University graduate and former member of its board of trustees. They live in Palm Beach, Florida.

== See also ==
- Glazer ownership of Manchester United
