= Leonard Johnson (defensive back, born 1990) =

American football player and coach (born 1990)

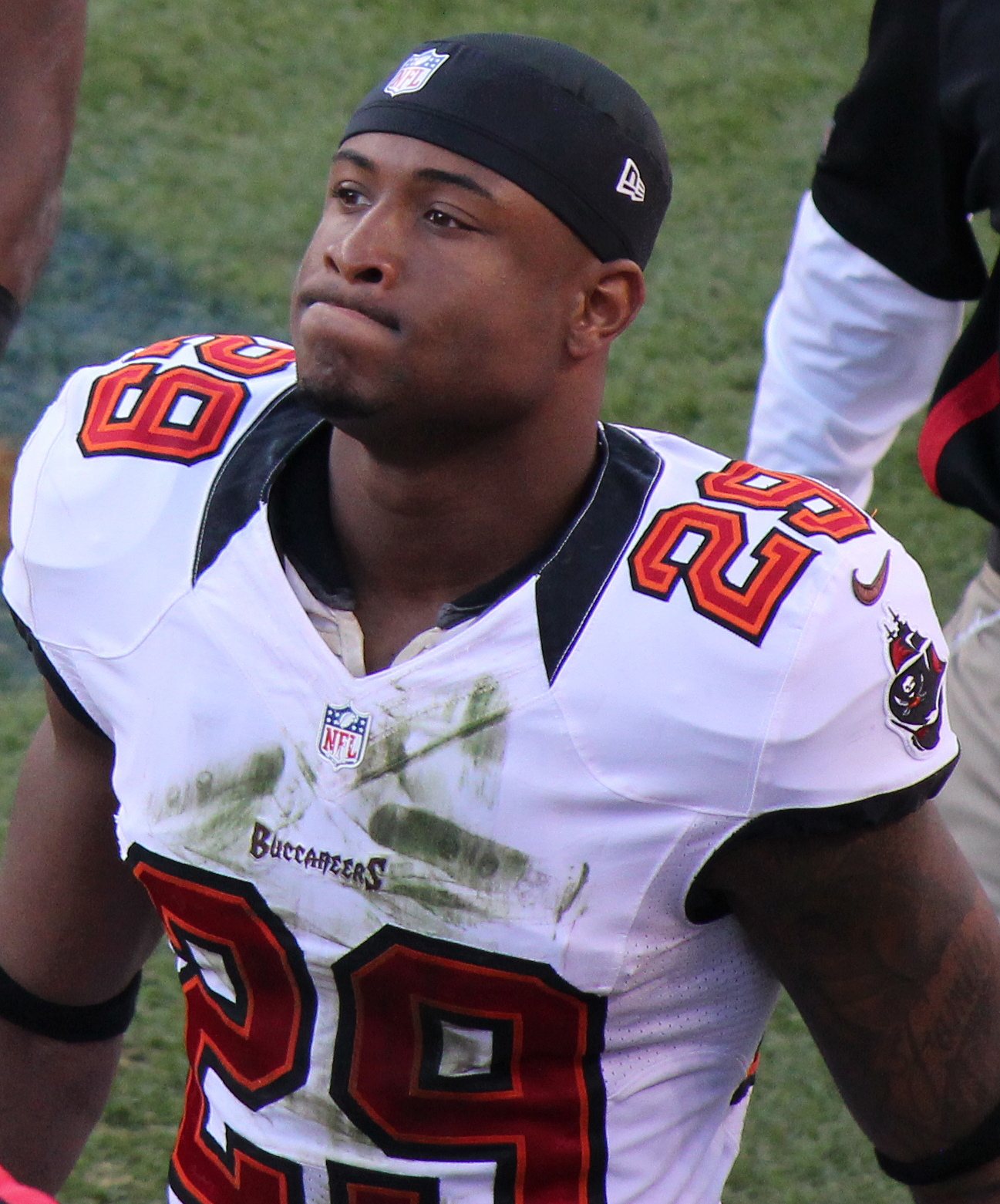
- Johnson with the Tampa Bay Buccaneers in 2012

Buffalo Bills
- Title: Coaching assistant

Personal information
- Born: March 30, 1990 (age 36); Clearwater, Florida, U.S.
- Listed height: 5 ft 10 in (1.78 m)
- Listed weight: 194 lb (88 kg)

Career information
- Position: Cornerback (No. 29, 34, 23, 24, 27)
- High school: Largo (Largo, Florida)
- College: Iowa State
- NFL draft: 2012: undrafted

Career history

Playing
- Tampa Bay Buccaneers (2012–2015); New England Patriots (2015); Carolina Panthers (2016); Buffalo Bills (2017); New York Giants (2018)*; Arizona Cardinals (2018)
- * Offseason or practice squad member only

Coaching
- Buffalo Bills (2020–present) Coaching assistant

Awards and highlights
- Second-team All-Big 12 (2011)

Career NFL statistics
- Total tackles: 251
- Sacks: 1
- Forced fumbles: 7
- Fumble recoveries: 2
- Interceptions: 5
- Defensive touchdowns: 2
- Stats at Pro Football Reference

Leonard Johnson (born March 30, 1990) is an American former professional football coach and former player who is a coaching assistant for the Buffalo Bills of the National Football League (NFL). He played in the NFL as a defensive back.

Johnson played college football for the Iowa State Cyclones and was signed by the NFL's Tampa Bay Buccaneers as an undrafted free agent in 2012. He also played for the New England Patriots, Carolina Panthers, Buffalo Bills, and Arizona Cardinals.

== College career ==
Johnson attended Iowa State University from 2008 to 2011. As a freshman in 2008, he set an NCAA record for most kick return yards in a game with 319. During his career he started 43 of 50 games, recording 247 tackles and six interceptions.

== Professional career ==
Pre-draft measurables
| Height | Weight | Arm length | Hand span | Wingspan | 40-yard dash | 10-yard split | 20-yard split | 20-yard shuttle | Three-cone drill | Vertical jump | Broad jump | Bench press |
|---|---|---|---|---|---|---|---|---|---|---|---|---|
| 5 ft 9 7/8 in (1.77 m) | 196 lb (89 kg) | 28 3/4 in (0.73 m) | 8 in (0.20 m) | 5 ft 11 5/8 in (1.82 m) | 4.56 s | 1.59 s | 2.64 s | 4.15 s | 6.96 s | 35.0 in (0.89 m) | 10 ft 0 in (3.05 m) | 15 reps |
All values from NFL Combine/Pro Day

=== Tampa Bay Buccaneers ===
==== 2012 season ====
On April 30, 2012, the Tampa Bay Buccaneers signed Johnson to a three-year, $1.44 million contract that included a signing bonus of $5,000.

Throughout training camp, Johnson competed for a roster spot as a backup cornerback against E. J. Biggers, Brandon McDonald, Myron Lewis, and Anthony Gaitor. Head coach Greg Schiano named Johnson the fifth cornerback on the depth chart to begin the regular season. He was listed behind Aqib Talib, Eric Wright, Brandon McDonald, and E. J. Biggers.

During his rookie campaign he showed great promise when he finished the year with 41 tackles, one forced fumble, and three interceptions.

==== 2013 season ====
In his sophomore campaign he improved his tackle stats to 62 tackles but only recorded one forced fumble and one interception.

==== 2014 season ====
During his 3rd season he saw transition into a new Tampa 2 system installed by new head coach Lovie Smith and defensive coordinator Leslie Fraizer. He was used more in rotation as opposed to a full-time starter and finished his 2014 season with 45 total tackles, three forced fumbles, and one interception. Johnson was released from the Buccaneers on September 1, 2015, after breaking his leg early in the preseason.

==== 2015 season ====
On March 10, 2015, the Tampa Bay Buccaneers re-signed Johnson to a one-year deal. On September 1, 2015, Johnson was waived by the Buccaneers. On September 2, 2015, the Buccaneers placed Johnson on season-ending injured reserve. On December 3, 2015, Johnson was waived from the Buccaneers' injured reserve.

=== New England Patriots ===
On December 9, 2015, Johnson was signed by the New England Patriots. He made his Patriots debut the following week in a 27–6 win over the Houston Texans and recorded two passes defensed. On February 17, 2016, Johnson was released by the Patriots.

=== Carolina Panthers ===
On July 14, 2016, Johnson signed with the Carolina Panthers. After starting the season on the reserve/non-football injury list after suffering an Achilles injury in March, Johnson was activated to the active roster on October 28, 2016.

=== Buffalo Bills ===
On March 17, 2017, Johnson signed with the Buffalo Bills. He played in 15 games with seven starts, recording 52 tackles and seven passes defensed.

=== New York Giants ===
On August 3, 2018, Johnson signed with the New York Giants. He was released on September 1, 2018.

=== Arizona Cardinals ===
On November 14, 2018, Johnson was signed by the Arizona Cardinals. He played in six games with one start before being released on December 28, 2018.
