= First Allied Corporation =

American real-estate holding company

- Type: Private
- Industry: Holding company
- Founded: Los Angeles, California (1984)
- Headquarters: Rochester, New York
- Net income: US$9 billion (2010)
- Owner: Glazer family
- Website: glazer.com

First Allied Corporation is an American real-estate holding company that owns and rents out shopping malls across the United States. It was founded in 1984 and is owned by the Glazer family. Bryan Glazer, Joel Glazer and Edward Glazer own part of the company and Edward is co-chairman. The company is based in Rochester, New York.

== Assets ==
As of 2013, First Allied Corporation owns over 6.7 million square feet of shopping center space across 20 states, including California, Colorado, Texas, Florida, Georgia, North Carolina, Virginia, Illinois, Ohio, New York and New Jersey.
