= Malcolm Glazer =

American sports team owner (1928–2014)

- Glazer at the Buccaneers' Super Bowl parade in 2003
- Born: Malcolm Glazer; August 15, 1928; Rochester, New York, U.S.
- Died: May 28, 2014 (aged 85); Palm Beach, Florida, U.S.
- Occupation: Businessman
- Spouse: Linda Glazer (m. 1961)
- Children: 6, including Avram, Bryan, and Joel
- Awards: Super Bowl champion (2002)

Malcolm Glazer (August 15, 1928 – May 28, 2014) was an American businessman and sports team owner. He was the president and chief executive officer of First Allied Corporation, a holding company for his varied business interests, and owned both Manchester United of the Premier League and the Tampa Bay Buccaneers of the National Football League.

== Early life ==
Born to a Jewish family in Rochester, New York, Glazer was the fifth of seven children of immigrants, Abraham and Hannah Glazer. He began working in his father's watch parts business at age 8. At 15, when his father died, he sold watches door to door to help support his family. Reuters quoted Glazer as saying his father's death "was probably the most tragic thing that ever happened in my life, but it was good in one way" because "it made me a man." He briefly attended Sampson College in Romulus, New York before committing himself full-time to jewelry and watch repair. A small man with a reddish beard, he was referred to in the news media as "the leprechaun".

== Business history ==
Glazer obtained the watch repair concession at the Sampson Air Force Base. When the base closed in 1956, he expanded into real estate investing in single-family homes, duplexes and commercial buildings in Rochester, eventually owning commercial real estate across America. In 1963, he bought the National Bank of Savannah in upstate New York. In 1973, he bought the first of five health care facilities he was to own, the West Hill Convalescent Center in Hartford, Connecticut. In 1976, he purchased three television stations for $20 million including WRBL in Columbus, Georgia. In 1984, he founded First Allied Corporation, a holding company for his various endeavors where he served as president and chief executive officer. First Allied invested in a diverse portfolio of international holdings and public companies including: Zapata Corporation, Houlihan's Restaurant group, Harley-Davidson, Formica, Tonka Toys, Specialty Equipment and Omega Protein.

Glazer first gained national business attention in 1984, when he launched an unsuccessful $7.6 billion bid to buy the government-controlled freight rail company, Conrail. He was later the largest shareholder of kitchen designer Formica in 1988 and, later, with motorcycle manufacturer Harley-Davidson. Glazer achieved control of Zapata Corporation, an oil and gas company founded by George H. W. Bush. Glazer successfully diversified it into fish protein and Caribbean supermarkets.

To summarise, Glazer owned a diverse portfolio of investments, which included food service equipment, food packaging and food supplies, marine protein, broadcasting, health care, property, banking, natural gas and oil, the Internet, stocks and bonds.

== Sports ownership ==
=== Tampa Bay Buccaneers ===
Glazer purchased the Tampa Bay Buccaneers National Football League (NFL) franchise on January 16, 1995, following the death of former owner Hugh Culverhouse. He paid $192 million, a league record at that time. Glazer served as president of the team, while sons Bryan, Joel and Edward were co-chairmen at the time.

Since coming under the Glazer family's ownership, the club has experienced an upswing in its fortunes, winning 231 regular season games, earning 12 playoff berths and winning Super Bowl XXXVII and Super Bowl LV, the latter following Glazer's death. Prior to Glazer's acquisition of the franchise, the Buccaneers had won just 87 games in 19 seasons and advanced to the postseason just three times.

Tampa Bay also eclipsed the club record for wins in a regular season with 12 in 2002. Tampa Bay was the only team in the league to play in the postseason each year from 1999 to 2002. The 2007 campaign saw the Buccaneers claim their third NFC South Division title in six years, the sixth division crown in franchise history.

After the team finished 9–7 in 2008, the team fired Jon Gruden, the most successful coach in franchise history. The team did not make the playoffs again until the 2020 season under the leadership of Bruce Arians as coach and Tom Brady as quarterback.

In January 2009, Glazer and his family hired Raheem Morris as head coach of the Buccaneers, making him the youngest head coach in the NFL upon his appointment. In addition, the family named longtime Director of Pro Personnel Mark Dominik as the fourth general manager in club history. Morris went 17–31 as a head coach and was fired after three seasons. The fact that the Buccaneers lost their final 10 games of the 2011 season was a likely contributor to the decision.

On January 27, 2012, Glazer and his family hired long-time Rutgers University head coach Greg Schiano as the ninth head coach in franchise history. Schiano only lasted two seasons, being fired following a disappointing 4–12 season in 2013. Mark Dominik was also fired at that time, lasting five seasons. During his tenure the team compiled a record of 28–52, which included only one winning season.

Glazer devoted a significant amount of time working to make the organization more fan-friendly by greatly increasing fan activities at Buccaneers home games through the expansion of the club's community relations and special events departments. His mandate to enhance the team's visibility in the community was reflected through increased appearances by Buccaneer players, coaches, cheerleaders and front office officials in recent years. Since 1999, the team has also coordinated with the Glazer Family Foundation to host "Gameday for Kids", a program that has hosted over 13,000 underprivileged youth at Buccaneers home games, giving them an opportunity to spend pregame moments on the playing field and to cheer on the Buccaneers from exclusive seats in Raymond James Stadium.

=== Manchester United ===
Glazer acquired ownership of Manchester United F.C. in a £790m takeover by gradually buying out United shareholders between 2003 and 2005. Glazer's takeover was protested by a large portion of United's fans due to concerns about the use of the club's financial reserves and the taking on of large amounts of debt. Despite transferring the borrowing costs of purchasing the club on to Manchester United’s books, Glazer continued to collect dividend payments and continued with his children after his passing. His family has not paid down any of the principal debt nor made any investments in to the infrastructure of Manchester United prompting continued protests over the Glazer ownership and calls for the family to sell its shares. Since When Glazer suffered a stroke in April 2006, his sons Joel and Avram took over the day-to-day running of the club, and his family continued to control the club following his death in 2014. Their 90% stake in the club was split equally among Glazer's six children.

== Philanthropy, lobbying, and political influence ==
In addition to his business ventures, Glazer was also involved in philanthropic efforts. He launched the Glazer Family Foundation in 1999, which is dedicated to assisting charitable and educational causes in the Tampa Bay community. During its existence, the foundation has donated millions in programs, tickets, grants and in-kind contributions. The foundation donated $5 million toward the construction of the Glazer Children's Museum in downtown Tampa, which opened on September 25, 2010.

Glazer also oversaw the operations of the far-reaching Glazer Family Foundation's Vision Program, created in 2006 to provide school children with an opportunity to have vision problems identified in schools at an early age. The initiative, highlighted by the Vision Mobile, visits schools and provides eye examinations to thousands of disadvantaged children.

Glazer has also donated millions to Israeli universities like Ben-Gurion University.

Glazer's charitable activities also included the Tampa Bay Sports Commission, an organization that promotes amateur sports activities. Glazer committed $2 million to the commission.

In 2025, his son Edward and daughter-in-law Shari Glazer were among the donors who funded the White House's East Wing demolition, and planned building of a ballroom.

== Personal life ==
Glazer married his wife, Linda, in 1961. They lived in Palm Beach, Florida. They had five sons, Avram Glazer, Kevin Glazer, Bryan Glazer, Joel Glazer and Edward Glazer, and one daughter, Darcie S. Glazer Kassewitz.

Glazer, who had been in poor health since suffering two strokes in April 2006, died at age 85 on May 28, 2014.

At the time of his death, Forbes estimated his net worth to be US$4 billion.
