= Joel Glazer =

American businessman (born 1967)

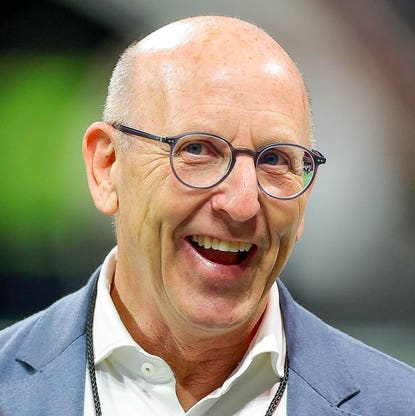
- Glazer in 2024
- Born: March 31, 1967 (age 59); Rochester, New York, U.S.
- Education: American University
- Occupations: Businessman; sports team owner
- Known for: Co-owner of the Tampa Bay Buccaneers; Co-owner and co-chairman of Manchester United
- Father: Malcolm Glazer
- Relatives: Avram Glazer (brother); Bryan Glazer (brother)
- Awards: Two-time Super Bowl champion

Joel Glazer (born March 31, 1967) is an American businessman and sports team owner. He is part of the Glazer family, who control First Allied Corporation and HRG Group, the Tampa Bay Buccaneers of the National Football League (NFL), and Manchester United of the Premier League. The family is based in Florida.

== Early life and education ==
Glazer was born to Linda and Malcolm Glazer, a businessman and billionaire. He grew up in Rochester, New York, and attended the American University in Washington, D.C., receiving a degree in Interdisciplinary Studies.

== Career ==
After working alongside his father Malcolm to successfully acquire the Tampa Bay Buccaneers franchise in 1995, Glazer worked in conjunction with his brother, Bryan, to build a community consensus for local approval of what would become Raymond James Stadium. Thereafter, in 2002, he helped lead the Tampa Bay Buccaneers to the franchise first Super Bowl victory versus the Oakland Raiders on January 26, 2003. In 2021, the Buccaneers became the first team to play in a Super Bowl at their home stadium, and would go on to win Super Bowl LV, giving the Glazer family their second title.

Glazer, the franchise's co-chairman, represents the franchise at all league meetings since 1995, and is very active in a wide range of NFL matters. During the 2019 offseason, Glazer was appointed chairman of the International Committee by NFL Commissioner Roger Goodell. He also continues his responsibilities on the league's Finance, Media and Legalized Sports Betting committees.

Glazer also serves as co-chairman of Manchester United, which has won five Premier League titles (2007, 2008, 2009, 2011 and 2013), one Champions League title (2008), five League Cups (2006, 2009, 2010, 2017, 2023), one FA Cup (2016) and one Europa League title (2017) during his tenure. His work with the club led to his naming in 2007 as one of the Top 10 most influential Americans in the United Kingdom by The Telegraph. However, Joel Glazer & the Glazer family have faced a decade of backlash & controversy from the fans over their mismanagement of Manchester United and the withdrawal of one billion pounds worth of dividends from the club.

Glazer has been active in the Tampa Bay community through the Glazer Family Foundation, which is dedicated to helping children in the Tampa Bay area through charity initiatives. The Foundation donated $5 million toward the construction of the Glazer Children's Museum, in downtown Tampa, which opened in 2010 and was named one of the Top Ten Family Museums in the country by Women's Day magazine. For its wide-reaching charitable efforts, the Tampa Bay Sports Commission named the Glazer Family Foundation the Foundation of the Year at the inaugural Sneaker Soiree held in 2011.

In 2021, Glazer played a leading role in the attempt to set up a breakaway European Super League, which would end the European football pyramid system and replace it with a closed league without relegation and promotion. After a strong backlash, Glazer and the other individuals involved backed away from the project.

== Awards and honors ==
- Two-time Super Bowl champion (as Tampa Bay Buccaneers owner/executive)
- 2021 Best Team ESPY Award (as Tampa Bay Buccaneers owner/executive)

== See also ==
- Glazer ownership of Manchester United
