= Eric Wright (cornerback, born 1985) =

American football player (born 1985)

San Francisco 49ers
- Title: Alumni coordinator

Personal information
- Born: July 24, 1985 (age 41); San Francisco, California, U.S.
- Listed height: 5 ft 10 in (1.78 m)
- Listed weight: 200 lb (91 kg)

Career information
- Position: Defensive back (No. 24, 21, 30)
- High school: Riordan (San Francisco)
- College: UNLV
- NFL draft: 2007: 2nd round, 53rd overall pick

Career history
- Cleveland Browns (2007–2010); Detroit Lions (2011); Tampa Bay Buccaneers (2012); San Francisco 49ers (2013)

Awards and highlights
- Second-team All-MW (2006)

Career NFL statistics
- Total tackles: 369
- Sacks: 1
- Forced fumbles: 3
- Fumble recoveries: 5
- Interceptions: 15
- Defensive touchdowns: 2
- Stats at Pro Football Reference

Eric Andrew Wright (born July 24, 1985) is an American former professional football player who was a cornerback in the National Football League (NFL). He was selected by the Cleveland Browns in the second round of the 2007 NFL draft. He played college football for the USC Trojans and UNLV Rebels.

Wright also played for the Detroit Lions, Tampa Bay Buccaneers, and San Francisco 49ers.

== College career ==
=== USC Trojans ===
Wright attended the University of Southern California (USC) for two years before attending the University of Nevada, Las Vegas (UNLV). After being redshirted his first year, he was a starter his second year, and started in the 2005 Orange Bowl, where he recorded four tackles and an interception.

=== UNLV Rebels ===
Wright transferred to UNLV after being expelled by USC. Police found 136 tablets of Ecstasy and GHB in Wright's apartment while investigating a sexual assault allegation against Wright. Wright sat out the 2005 season due to NCAA transfer guidelines. Wright played one year at UNLV before deciding to declare for the NFL draft. He was a university studies major.

== Professional career ==
=== Cleveland Browns ===
Wright was selected by the Cleveland Browns in the second round (53rd overall) of the 2007 NFL draft. The Browns acquired the pick from the Dallas Cowboys to select Wright. While he was a projected first round pick, he fell to the second round due to his troubled college past.

In Wright's first season with the Browns, he started 13 of 16 games. He recorded his first career interception on October 14, 2007, against Miami Dolphins quarterback Cleo Lemon. He won his first Defensive Player of the Week award after his performance during week 6 of the 2008 NFL season against the New York Giants, where he had a 94-yard interception return for a touchdown.

=== Detroit Lions ===
On July 29, 2011, Wright signed with the Detroit Lions. During his one season for the Lions, he started all 16 games and recorded 74 tackles and four interceptions.

=== Tampa Bay Buccaneers ===
On March 14, 2012, Wright signed a five-year, $37.5 million contract with the Tampa Bay Buccaneers.

On July 19, 2013, Wright was traded from the Tampa Bay Buccaneers to the San Francisco 49ers for a conditional late-round 2014 draft pick . After he failed his team physical, the trade was voided causing his rights to revert to the Buccaneers who subsequently released him.

=== San Francisco 49ers ===
On August 8, 2013, Wright signed a one-year deal with the San Francisco 49ers. On August 27, 2013, he was placed on the reserve/non-football injury list.

On June 17, 2014, Wright announced his retirement from the NFL.

== NFL career statistics ==
Legend
**Bold**	Career high

=== Regular season ===
Year	Team	Games		Tackles					Interceptions					Fumbles			
Year	Team	GP	GS	Cmb	Solo	Ast	Sck	TFL	Int	Yds	TD	Lng	PD	FF	FR	Yds	TD
2007	CLE	14	13	**76**	**71**	5	**1.0**	1	1	0	0	0	11	0	0	0	0
2008	CLE	16	16	66	61	5	0.0	**3**	3	**131**	**1**	**94**	13	**2**	**3**	-2	0
2009	CLE	16	16	65	57	**8**	0.0	2	**4**	74	0	47	14	0	0	0	0
2010	CLE	13	10	42	36	6	0.0	2	1	0	0	0	9	0	1	**11**	0
2011	DET	16	16	75	68	7	0.0	**3**	**4**	49	0	22	**16**	1	0	0	0
2012	TAM	10	10	38	33	5	0.0	0	1	60	**1**	60	7	0	1	0	0
2013	SFO	7	0	7	7	0	0.0	0	1	0	0	0	2	0	0	0	0
Career		92	81	369	333	36	1.0	11	15	314	2	94	72	3	5	9	0

=== Postseason ===
Year	Team	Games		Tackles					Interceptions					Fumbles			
Year	Team	GP	GS	Cmb	Solo	Ast	Sck	TFL	Int	Yds	TD	Lng	PD	FF	FR	Yds	TD
2011	DET	1	1	**7**	**5**	**2**	0.0	0	0	0	0	0	**1**	0	0	0	0
2013	SFO	2	0	0	0	0	0.0	0	0	0	0	0	0	0	0	0	0
Career		3	1	7	5	2	0.0	0	0	0	0	0	1	0	0	0	0
