= Bryan Glazer =

American businessman and sports team owner (born 1964)

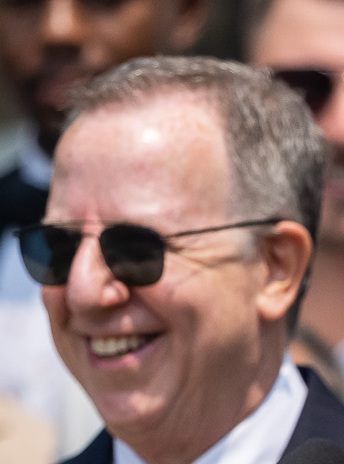
- Glazer in 2021
- Born: Bryan Glazer; October 27, 1964 (age 62); Rochester, New York, U.S.
- Education: American University
- Known for: Co-owner of the Tampa Bay Buccaneers; Co-owner of Manchester United
- Spouse: Shanna Glazer
- Children: 2
- Parent(s): Linda and Malcolm Glazer
- Family: Avram Glazer (brother); Joel Glazer (brother)
- Awards: Two-time Super Bowl champion (2002), (2020)

Bryan Glazer (born October 27, 1964) is an American businessman. Together with his brothers, Joel Glazer and Edward Glazer, he owns part of the First Allied Corporation, the Tampa Bay Buccaneers National Football League (NFL) franchise, and the English football club Manchester United. His family is based in Florida.

== Early life and education ==
Glazer was born to Linda and Malcolm Glazer, American businessman and billionaire, who were descendants of Lithuanian Jewish immigrants. Glazer received a bachelor's degree from American University in Washington, D.C. He majored in broadcast communications and was a leader of the Phi Sigma Kappa fraternity. He then received a Juris Doctor degree from the Whittier Law School located in Southern California.

== Career ==
Glazer is currently executive vice-president of the Tampa Bay Buccaneers and was appointed to that position in 1995. He was a key player in the design, development and construction of the Bucs new stadium. He also helped in re-designing the franchise logo. Under Glazer family ownership, the Buccaneers have two Super Bowl titles (XXXVII and LV - which was the first time a Super Bowl team played in its home stadium).

Glazer was appointed a director of Zapata Corporation in 1997, and served in that position until his retirement in 2009.

Glazer is currently a non-executive director of the Manchester United board, appointed by his father, Malcolm Glazer to replace the resigned members. Along with Andy Anson (Manchester United's commercial director) and Jeffrey Ajluni (Tampa Bay Buccaneers director of marketing and business development), Glazer was a key player in signing American International Group (AIG) as the club's new shirt sponsor for the 2006–07 season.

== Philanthropy ==
In 2016, Glazer donated $4 million to the renovation and conversion of the Fort Homer W. Hesterly Armory into the Bryan Glazer Family Jewish Community Center.

== Personal life ==
Glazer is married to Shanna Glazer. The couple have a daughter and a son.

== See also ==
- Glazer ownership of Manchester United
