= Mike Glennon =

American football player (born 1989)

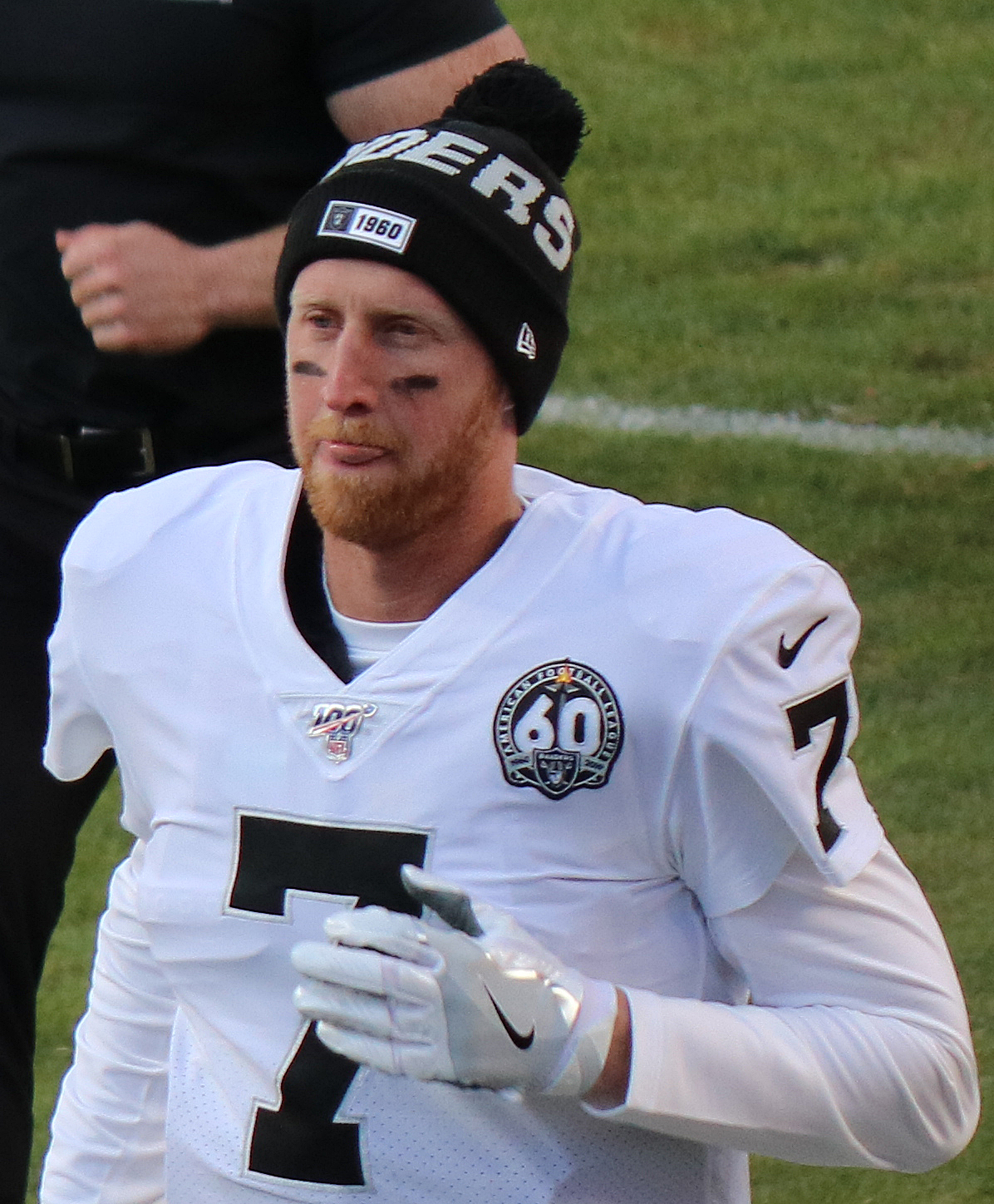
- Glennon with the Oakland Raiders in 2019

No. 8, 7, 2
- Position: Quarterback

Personal information
- Born: December 12, 1989 (age 36); Fairfax County, Virginia, U.S.
- Listed height: 6 ft 7 in (2.01 m)
- Listed weight: 225 lb (102 kg)

Career information
- High school: Westfield (Chantilly, Virginia)
- College: NC State (2008–2012)
- NFL draft: 2013: 3rd round, 73rd overall pick

Career history
- Tampa Bay Buccaneers (2013–2016); Chicago Bears (2017); Arizona Cardinals (2018); Oakland Raiders (2019); Jacksonville Jaguars (2020); New York Giants (2021); Miami Dolphins (2022)

Awards and highlights
- PFWA All-Rookie Team (2013)

Career NFL statistics
- Passing attempts: 1,147
- Passing completions: 689
- Completion percentage: 60.0%
- TD–INT: 47–35
- Passing yards: 7,025
- Passer rating: 78.6
- Rushing yards: 140
- Rushing touchdowns: 1
- Stats at Pro Football Reference

Michael Joseph Glennon (born December 12, 1989) is an American former professional football player who was a quarterback in the National Football League (NFL). He played college football for the NC State Wolfpack and was selected by the Tampa Bay Buccaneers in the third round of the 2013 NFL draft. He was also a member of the Chicago Bears, Arizona Cardinals, Oakland Raiders, Jacksonville Jaguars, New York Giants, and Miami Dolphins.

== Early life ==
Glennon attended Westfield High School in Fairfax County, Virginia, and played for the Westfield Bulldogs high school football and basketball teams. As a senior, he completed 171 of 265 passes for 2,557 yards and 32 touchdowns. Glennon led his team to an undefeated 15–0 record and the Virginia Division 6 AAA State championship title when the Bulldogs defeated the Woodbridge High School Vikings 42–14. He was the Virginia Gatorade Player of the Year and was a Parade magazine high school All-American. He was rated the third-best quarterback recruit in the nation by Rivals.com in 2008.

College recruiting
Name	Hometown	School	Height	Weight	40^{‡}	Commit date
Mike Glennon; Quarterback	Centreville, Virginia	Westfield High School	6 ft 7 in (2.01 m)	194 lb (88 kg)	4.9	Jan 25, 2008
Mike Glennon; Quarterback	Recruit ratings: Scout: Rivals:					
Overall recruit ranking: Scout: 5 (QB) Rivals: 3 (QB), 3 (Virginia)
‡ Refers to 40-yard dash; Note: In many cases, Scout, Rivals, 247Sports, On3, and ESPN may conflict in their listings of height, weight and 40 time.; In these cases, the average was taken. ESPN grades are on a 100-point scale.; Sources: "2008 N.C. State Football Commitments". Rivals.; "2008 N.C. State Football Recruiting Commits". Scout.; "Scout.com Team Recruiting Rankings". Scout.; "2008 Team Ranking". Rivals.com.

== College career ==
Glennon enrolled in North Carolina State University, where he played for the Wolfpack from 2008 to 2012. In 2008, he was redshirted. In 2009 and 2010, he was the backup to starting quarterback Russell Wilson. During that time, he completed 33 of 52 passes for 326 yards with a touchdown and two interceptions. As a junior in 2011, he took over as the starter. On November 26, against Maryland, he had 306 passing yards, five touchdowns, and one interception. For the 2011 season, he completed 283 of 453 passes for 3,054 yards with 31 touchdowns and 12 interceptions. In his final season with the Wolfpack, he had some great statistical games. On September 22, against The Citadel, he had 233 passing yards, one passing touchdown, and two rushing touchdowns. On September 29, against Miami, he had 440 passing yards, four touchdowns, and two interceptions. On October 27, against North Carolina, he had 467 passing yards, five touchdowns, and two interceptions. On November 17, against Clemson, he had 493 passing yards, five touchdowns, and one interception. Overall, in the 2012 season, he completed 330 of 564 passes for 4,031 yards with 31 touchdowns and 17 interceptions.

== Professional career ==
Pre-draft measurables
Height	Weight	Arm length	Hand span	Wingspan	40-yard dash	10-yard split	20-yard split	20-yard shuttle	Three-cone drill	Vertical jump	Broad jump	Wonderlic
6 ft 7 1/8 in (2.01 m)	225 lb (102 kg)	33 1/8 in (0.84 m)	9 5/8 in (0.24 m)	6 ft 6 3/4 in (2.00 m)	4.94 s	1.74 s	2.90 s	4.52 s	7.49 s	26.5 in (0.67 m)	8 ft 6 in (2.59 m)	26
All values from NFL Combine

=== Tampa Bay Buccaneers ===
==== 2013 season ====
On April 26, 2013, Glennon was selected by the Tampa Bay Buccaneers in the third round (73rd overall pick) of the 2013 NFL draft. He was the third quarterback taken in the draft behind EJ Manuel (16th pick) and Geno Smith (39th pick). On June 12, 2013, Glennon signed a four-year contract with the Buccaneers worth $3,104,063, with a $637,500 signing bonus.

On September 25, 2013, the Bucs announced that Glennon would start in Week 4 over Josh Freeman, after the team started the season 0–3. Glennon threw his first career touchdown to wide receiver Mike Williams, but threw a critical late interception to Arizona Cardinals cornerback Patrick Peterson and lost 13–10.

Despite Glennon throwing seven touchdowns to one interception and achieving a passer rating over 90 in the next four games, the Buccaneers lost their next four games to drop to 0–8. He earned his first win as an NFL starter the next week against the Miami Dolphins, though he had just 139 passing yards and an interception. He won his next two games as well with a combined passer rating of 142.0 and completing 77% of his passes. He went 1–4 the rest of the season, without reaching a passer rating of 80.

The Buccaneers finished their season with a 4–12 record and 4–9 with Glennon at quarterback. He finished his rookie campaign with an 83.9 passer rating, completing 59.4 percent of his passes (247 of 416) for 2,608 passing yards, 19 touchdowns, and 9 interceptions. Glennon was named to the Pro Football Writer's Association's All-Rookie Team for his strong first year performance, becoming the second Buccaneers quarterback to receive this award, joining Doug Williams (1978).

==== 2014 season ====
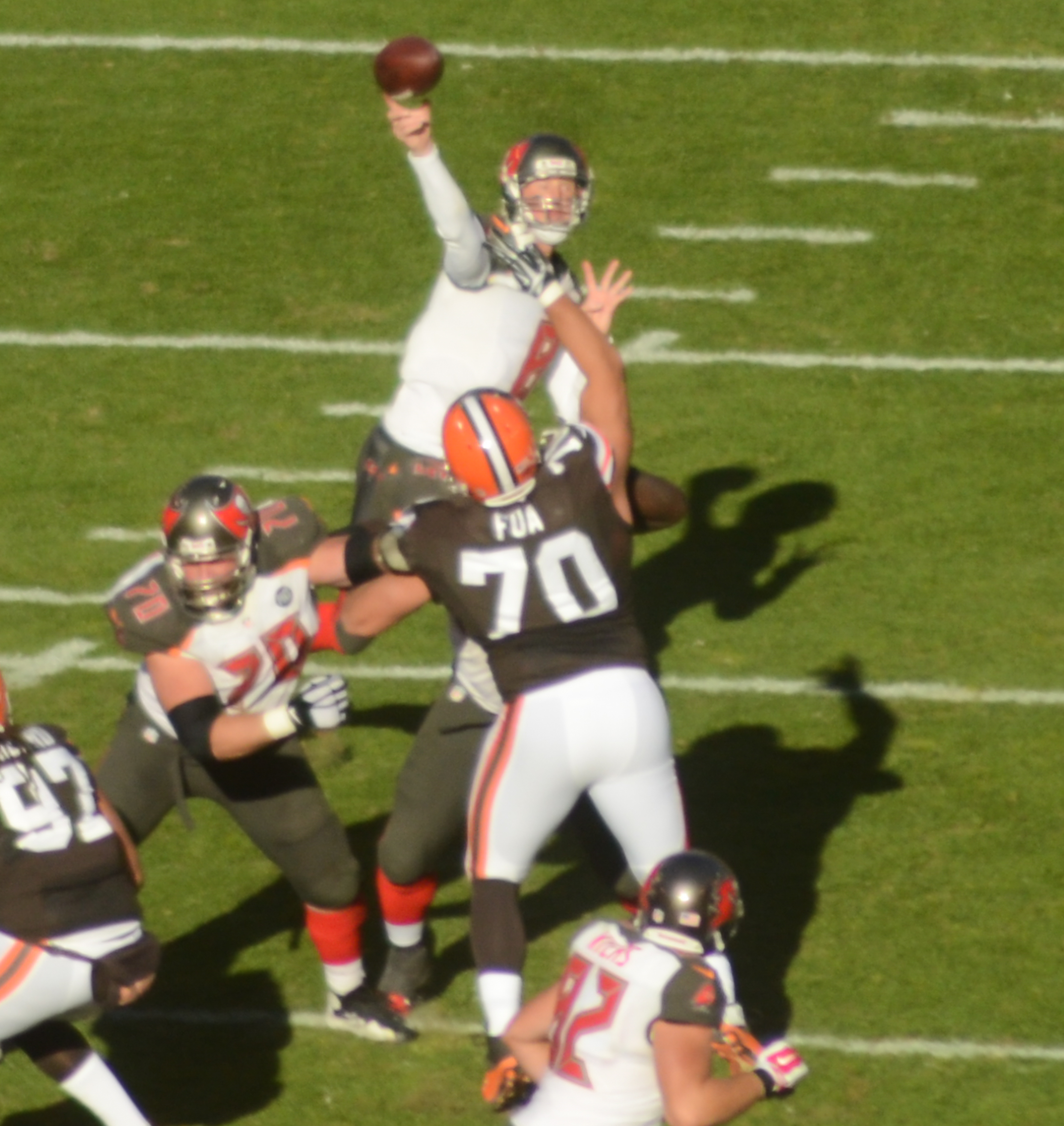
Glennon passing for the Buccaneers in 2014

New head coach Lovie Smith quickly announced that newly signed journeyman Josh McCown would be the starting quarterback for the upcoming 2014 season, leaving Glennon's future in Tampa Bay in question. On May 10, Smith stated while McCown would be the starter, Glennon was the Bucs' "quarterback of the future". That same day, Rick Stroud of the Tampa Bay Times reported that the Bucs turned down at least six trade offers for Glennon during the 2014 NFL draft.

Glennon made his 2014 season debut Week 3 on Thursday Night Football against the Atlanta Falcons. Glennon entered the game near the end of the first half, after McCown suffered a thumb injury. At the time of Glennon's entry into the game, the Buccaneers already trailed 35–0. Glennon completed 17 of 24 passes for 121 yards, 1 touchdown, and no interceptions. The Bucs lost the game 56–14.

Glennon started the next five games in relief of the injured McCown. In his first game as starter, Glennon recorded his first career 300 yard game and the Bucs first season win, 27–24 over the Pittsburgh Steelers. However, the Bucs lost their next four games (two in overtime), and Smith brought McCown back as starter in Week 10.

The Buccaneers finished the season with a league worst 2–14 record, and 1–4 with Glennon as the quarterback. Glennon finished his second season campaign with an 83.3 passer rating. He completed 57.6 percent of his passes (117 of 203) for 1,417 passing yards, and threw 10 touchdowns and 6 interceptions.

==== 2015 season ====
Glennon did not see any playing time during the 2015 season. He was the backup to the number one overall pick in the 2015 NFL draft, Jameis Winston.

==== 2016 season ====
In 2016, Glennon was again the backup to Winston. After Winston suffered a knee injury midway through the fourth quarter of the Week 9 game against the Falcons, Glennon entered and completed 10 of 11 passes for 75 yards and a touchdown. Glennon also appeared in the Week 10 game against the Chicago Bears but did not record any statistics in three plays.

=== Chicago Bears ===
On March 9, 2017, Glennon signed a three-year, $45 million contract with the Bears. On September 4, 2017, the Bears named Glennon as their starting quarterback for Week 1 against the Falcons.

On September 10, 2017, in his Bears regular season debut, Glennon finished 26-of-40 for 213 yards and a touchdown in a 23–17 home loss to the Falcons at Soldier Field. His first touchdown as a Bear was a 19-yard pass to running back Tarik Cohen. He had 301 yards, but had two interceptions, in a Week 2 29–7 loss to his former team, the Buccaneers, and 101 yards and a late interception in an overtime win over the Steelers. In the next game, he threw two interceptions and lost two fumbles in a Week 4 Thursday Night Football loss to the Green Bay Packers. On October 2, seven days before the Week 5 game against the Minnesota Vikings, it was announced that Glennon had been benched in favor of rookie first-round pick Mitchell Trubisky. Glennon saw no more playing time in the 2017 season after Trubisky was named the starter. In four games, he finished with 833 passing yards, four touchdowns, and five interceptions. He also had eight turnovers, which led the league at the time of his benching.

On February 28, 2018, the Bears' general manager Ryan Pace announced that Glennon would be released at the start of the new league year. He was officially released on March 14, 2018.

=== Arizona Cardinals ===
On March 16, 2018, Glennon signed a two-year contract with the Cardinals. He appeared in two games in the 2018 season in relief of Josh Rosen. He was released on March 8, 2019.

=== Oakland Raiders ===
On March 22, 2019, Glennon signed with the Oakland Raiders. In Week 7, against the Packers, Glennon came into the game in relief of Derek Carr. He completed two passes for 36 yards and a touchdown in the 42–24 loss.

=== Jacksonville Jaguars ===
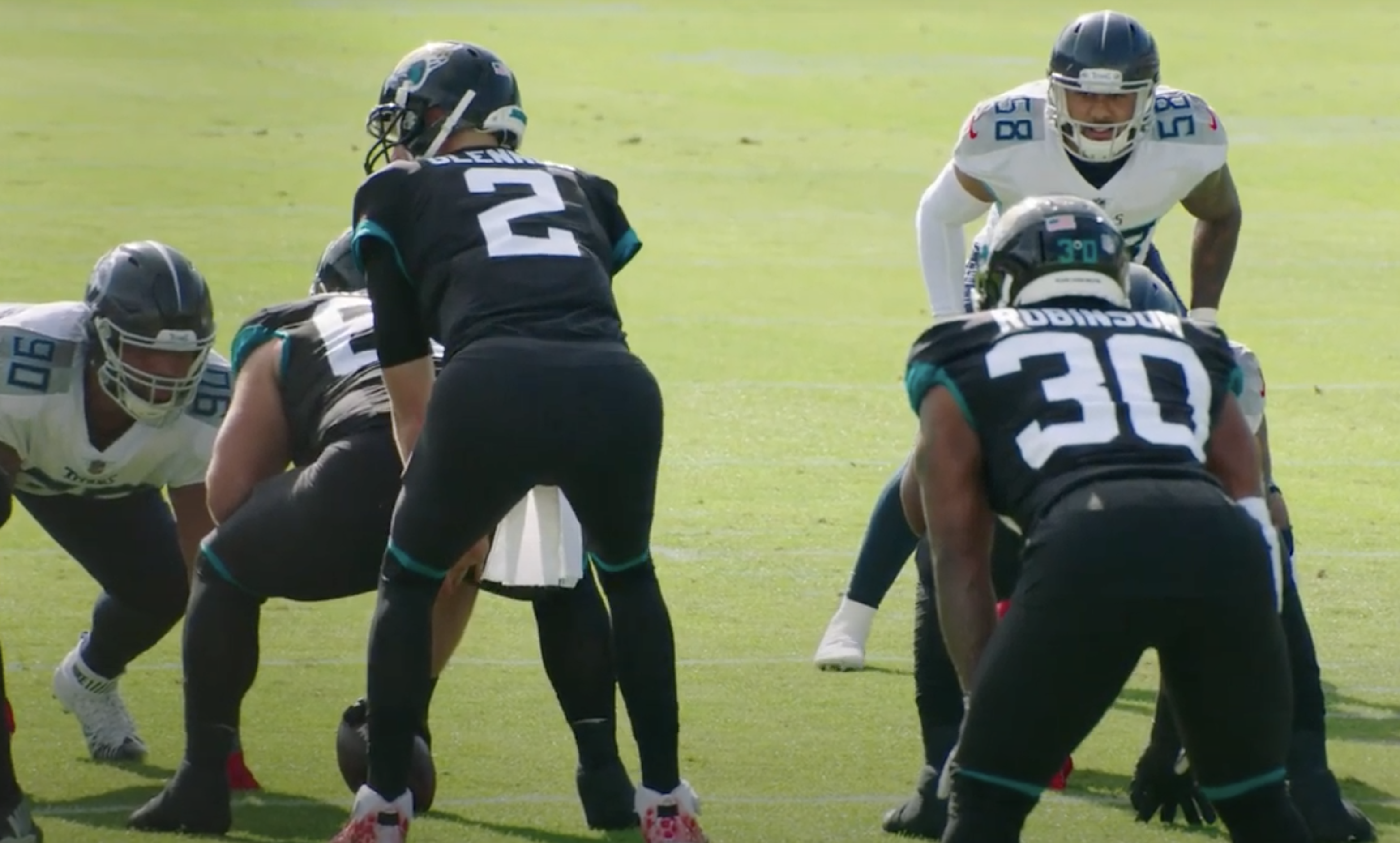
Glennon (#2) with the Jaguars in 2020

On May 12, 2020, Glennon signed with the Jacksonville Jaguars. He was released on September 5, 2020, and re-signed to the practice squad two days later. He was promoted to the active roster on September 8. On November 25, 2020, the Jaguars announced Glennon the starter for the Jaguars Week 12 matchup against the Cleveland Browns due to starter Gardner Minshew out with an injury and struggles from Jake Luton. It would be the first time Glennon had started a game since the 2017 season for the Chicago Bears. During the game, Glennon threw for 235 yards and two touchdowns during the 27–25 loss. In Week 14 against the Tennessee Titans, Glennon threw for 85 yards and an interception before being benched for Gardner Minshew during the 31–10 loss. In Week 16 against his former team, the Bears, Glennon threw for 211 yards, two touchdowns, and two interceptions during the 41–17 loss.

=== New York Giants ===
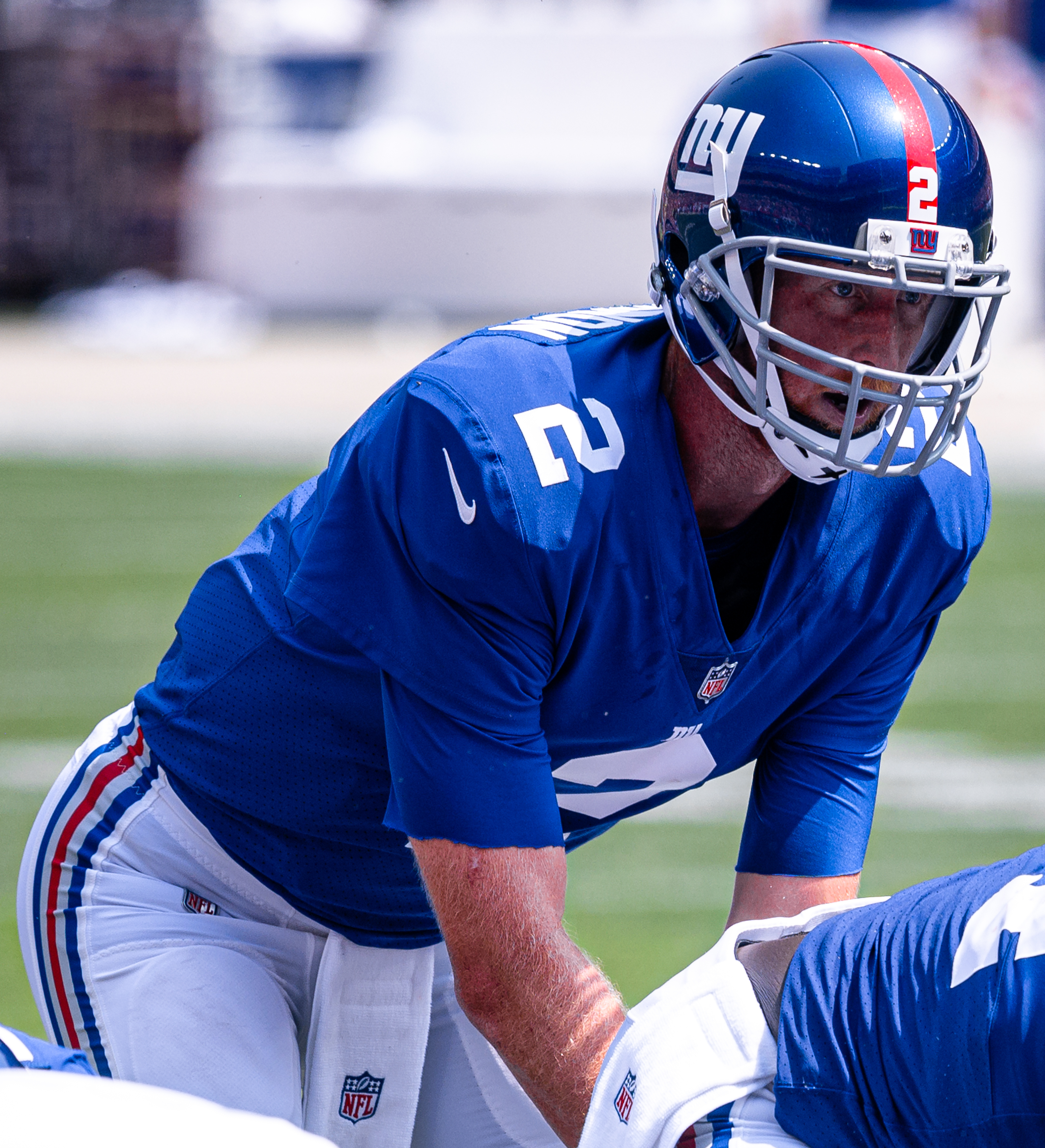
Glennon with the Giants in 2021

On March 19, 2021, Glennon signed a one-year, $1.35 million contract with the New York Giants. In Week 13 against the Dolphins, Glennon got his first start of the season due to Daniel Jones being injured. Glennon completed 23 of 44 passes for 187 yards and one interception in the 20–9 loss. In Week 14 against the Los Angeles Chargers, Glennon scored the first rushing touchdown of his career. Glennon missed the final game of the season due to a wrist injury.

=== Miami Dolphins ===
On January 4, 2023, the Miami Dolphins signed Glennon to their practice squad. He was elevated to the Dolphins' active roster for the team's week 18 game against the New York Jets on January 8 to backup rookie Skylar Thompson after both starter Tua Tagovailoa and backup quarterback Teddy Bridgewater dealing with injuries. His practice squad contract with the team expired after the season on January 15, 2023.

In May 2023, Glennon retired from football and became a real estate broker.

== Career statistics ==
=== NFL ===
Year	Team	Games			Passing								Rushing				Sacks		Fumbles	
Year	Team	GP	GS	Record	Cmp	Att	Pct	Yds	Avg	TD	Int	Rtg	Att	Yds	Avg	TD	Sck	SckY	Fum	Lost
2013	TB	13	13	4–9	247	416	59.4	2,608	6.3	19	9	83.9	27	37	1.4	0	40	314	7	4
2014	TB	6	5	1–4	117	203	57.6	1,417	7.0	10	6	83.3	10	49	4.9	0	16	91	2	0
2015	TB	0	0	—	DNP															
2016	TB	2	0	—	10	11	90.9	75	6.8	1	0	125.4	0	0	0.0	0	0	0	0	0
2017	CHI	4	4	1–3	93	140	66.4	833	6.0	4	5	76.9	4	4	1.0	0	8	78	5	3
2018	ARI	2	0	—	15	21	71.4	174	8.3	1	0	112.0	0	0	0.0	0	1	8	0	0
2019	OAK	2	0	—	6	10	60.0	56	5.6	1	0	108.8	2	0	0.0	0	0	0	3	1
2020	JAX	5	5	0–5	111	179	62.0	1,072	6.0	7	5	80.1	6	17	2.8	0	9	53	2	2
2021	NYG	6	4	0–4	90	167	53.9	790	4.7	4	10	49.7	7	33	4.7	1	9	72	6	3
2022	MIA	0	0	—	DNP															
Career		40	31	6–25	689	1,147	60.1	7,025	6.1	47	35	78.6	56	140	2.5	1	83	616	25	13

=== College ===
Year	Team	Passing								Rushing			
Year	Team	Cmp	Att	Pct	Yds	Y/A	TD	Int	Rtg	Att	Yds	Avg	TD
2009	NC State	24	39	61.5	248	6.4	1	2	113.2	3	−9	−3.0	0
2010	NC State	9	13	69.2	78	6.0	0	0	119.6	1	3	3.0	0
2011	NC State	283	453	62.5	3,054	6.7	31	12	136.4	51	−110	−2.2	1
2012	NC State	330	564	58.5	4,031	7.1	31	17	130.7	56	−164	−2.9	2
Career		646	1,069	60.4	7,411	6.9	63	31	132.3	111	−280	−2.5	3

== Personal life ==
Glennon has an older brother and sister, Sean and Katie. Sean was a quarterback for the Virginia Tech Hokies from 2004 to 2008. Glennon completed his academic tenure at NC State with two degrees: a bachelor's degree in Business Management and a Master of Arts in Liberal Studies, graduating on December 14, 2012. His GPA in the MALS program, which had an emphasis in leadership and sports management, was in the 3.8 range on a 4.0 scale. The curriculum included classes in financial management of corporations and investments and portfolio management.

Glennon currently works as a real estate broker.
