= Jake Luton =

American football player (born 1996)

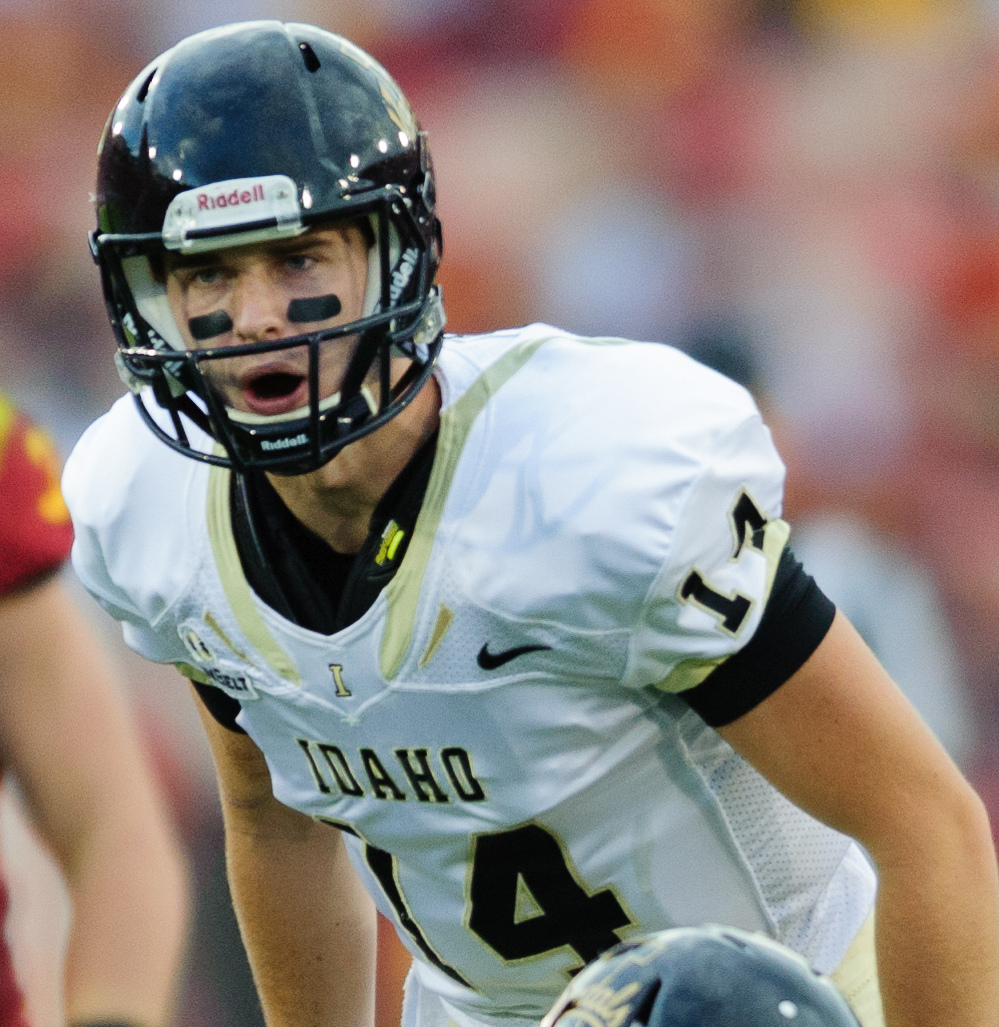
- Luton with the Idaho Vandals in 2015

Profile
- Position: Quarterback

Personal information
- Born: April 11, 1996 (age 30); Marysville, Washington, U.S.
- Listed height: 6 ft 6 in (1.98 m)
- Listed weight: 224 lb (102 kg)

Career information
- High school: Marysville Pilchuck
- College: Idaho (2014–2015); Ventura (2016); Oregon State (2017–2019)
- NFL draft: 2020: 6th round, 189th overall pick

Career history
- Jacksonville Jaguars (2020); Seattle Seahawks (2021); Miami Dolphins (2021)*; Jacksonville Jaguars (2022)*; New Orleans Saints (2022); Carolina Panthers (2023)*; New Orleans Saints (2023); Carolina Panthers (2023–2024)*; Las Vegas Raiders (2024)*
- * Offseason or practice squad member only

Career NFL statistics
- Passing attempts: 110
- Passing completions: 60
- Completion percentage: 54.5%
- TD–INT: 2–6
- Passing yards: 624
- Passer rating: 54.5
- Stats at Pro Football Reference

Jake Luton (born April 11, 1996) is an American professional football quarterback. He was selected by the Jacksonville Jaguars in the sixth round of the 2020 NFL draft. He played college football for the Idaho Vandals, Ventura Pirates, and Oregon State Beavers.

== Early life ==
Born and raised in Marysville, Washington, Luton played football and baseball at Marysville-Pilchuck High school and graduated in 2014. He was a two star recruit and committed to the University of Idaho in Moscow. At the time, the Vandals were a Football Bowl Subdivision program in the Sun Belt Conference under second-year head coach Paul Petrino.

== College career ==
=== Idaho ===
Luton redshirted as a true freshman in 2014. He played in eight games in 2015, throwing for 408 yards, and rushing for five touchdowns. In June 2016, he announced his departure from Idaho.

=== Ventura College ===
Luton transferred to two-year Ventura College in Southern California for his redshirt sophomore season in 2016. In eleven games, he threw for 3,551 yards and forty touchdowns.

=== Oregon State ===
Luton transferred to Oregon State University in Corvallis, led by third-year head coach Gary Andersen, and won the starting quarterback job in 2017. He suffered a back injury, which ended his season after starting just four games. Luton was granted a sixth year of eligibility after his fifth-year senior season in 2018, and started eleven games in 2019, throwing for 28 touchdowns with just three interceptions.

== Professional career ==
Pre-draft measurables
Height	Weight	Arm length	Hand span	Wingspan	40-yard dash	10-yard split	20-yard split	20-yard shuttle	Three-cone drill	Vertical jump	Broad jump	Wonderlic
6 ft 6 1/8 in (1.98 m)	224 lb (102 kg)	31 3/4 in (0.81 m)	10 3/8 in (0.26 m)	6 ft 5 5/8 in (1.97 m)	5.07 s	1.75 s	2.90 s	4.60 s	7.85 s	28.5 in (0.72 m)	8 ft 11 in (2.72 m)	33
All values from NFL Combine/Pro Day

=== Jacksonville Jaguars (first stint) ===
Luton was selected by the Jacksonville Jaguars in the sixth round with the 189th overall pick in the 2020 NFL draft.

On November 2, 2020, it was announced that Luton would make his first career start in Week 9 against the Houston Texans; starting quarterback Gardner Minshew was out with a thumb injury. He completed 26 of 38 passes for 304 yards with one touchdown and one interception, as well as a 13-yard rushing score, in the Jaguars' 27–25 loss. A day after the Texans game, it was announced that Luton would fill in for Minshew again in Week 10 against the Green Bay Packers. He completed 18 of 35 passes for 169 yards with one touchdown and one interception in the Jaguars' 24–20 loss. Luton was named the starter for the third consecutive game in Week 11 against the Pittsburgh Steelers. He had his worst performance yet against the Steelers, completing 16 of 37 passes for 151 yards with no touchdowns and four interceptions in the Jaguars' 27–3 loss. On November 25, the Jaguars announced they benched Luton for Mike Glennon due to his recent struggles.

On August 31, 2021, Luton was waived as part of the final roster cuts.

=== Seattle Seahawks ===
On September 2, 2021, Luton signed with the Seattle Seahawks. He was waived on September 28 and re-signed to the practice squad. Luton was activated on October 10 following an injury to starting quarterback Russell Wilson. He was released and resigned to the practice squad after the Seahawks signed quarterback Jacob Eason on October 21. He was again released on November 15.

=== Miami Dolphins ===
On November 17, 2021, Luton was signed to the Miami Dolphins' practice squad.

=== Jacksonville Jaguars (second stint) ===
On February 11, 2022, Luton signed a reserve/future contract with the Jacksonville Jaguars. He was waived on August 15, but re-signed eight days later. He was waived again on August 26.

=== New Orleans Saints (first stint) ===
On September 6, 2022, Luton signed with the practice squad of the New Orleans Saints. He was elevated to the active roster on October 1. On October 15, Luton was waived and re-signed to the practice squad.

Luton signed a reserve/future contract with New Orleans on January 9, 2023. On May 2, Luton was waived by the Saints.

=== Carolina Panthers (first stint) ===
On July 29, 2023, Luton signed with the Carolina Panthers. He was released on August 26 and re-signed to the practice squad a few weeks later.

=== New Orleans Saints (second stint) ===
On September 26, 2023, the Saints signed Luton off of the Panthers' practice squad. He was released on October 16, following the end of the suspension of quarterback Jake Haener.

=== Carolina Panthers (second stint) ===
On October 25, 2023, the Panthers signed Luton to their practice squad. He was released on November 30, and re-signed to the practice squad on December 5. He was released again on December 21.

On August 5, 2024, Luton re-signed with the Panthers, but was placed on injured reserve, and released following an injury settlement on August 29.

=== Las Vegas Raiders ===
On December 10, 2024, the Las Vegas Raiders signed Luton to their practice squad.

== Career statistics ==
=== NFL ===
Year	Team	Games		Passing								Rushing				Sacks		Fumbles	
Year	Team	GP	GS	Cmp	Att	Pct	Yds	Avg	TD	Int	Rtg	Att	Yds	Avg	TD	Sck	SckY	Fum	Lost
2020	JAX	3	3	60	110	54.5	473	6.5	2	6	54.5	1	13	13.0	1	7	52	2	0
2021	SEA	0	0	Did not play															
2022	NO	0	0	Did not play															
2023	NO	0	0	Did not play															
Career		3	3	60	110	54.5	473	6.5	2	6	54.5	1	13	13.0	1	5	34	2	0

=== College ===
Season	Team	Games			Passing								Rushing			
Season	Team	GP	GS	Record	Cmp	Att	Pct	Yds	Y/A	TD	Int	Rtg	Att	Yds	Avg	TD
2014	Idaho	1	0	—	Redshirt											
2015	Idaho	8	1	0–1	49	78	62.8	383	4.9	1	4	98.0	27	73	2.7	5
2016	Ventura	11	11	8–3	261	462	56.5	3,551	7.7	40	15	143.1	71	175	2.5	6
2017	Oregon State	4	4	1–3	83	135	61.5	853	6.3	4	4	118.4	17	27	1.6	0
2018	Oregon State	8	5	0–5	140	224	62.5	1,660	7.4	10	4	135.9	28	-144	-5.1	0
2019	Oregon State	11	11	5–6	222	358	62.0	2,714	7.6	28	3	149.8	44	-87	-2.0	1
Career		43	32	14–18	755	1,257	60.0	9,161	7.3	83	30	138.3	187	44	0.2	12
