= 2020 Jacksonville Jaguars season =

26th season in franchise history

- Owner: Shahid Khan
- General manager: David Caldwell (fired Nov. 29); Trent Baalke (interim)
- Head coach: Doug Marrone
- Offensive coordinator: Jay Gruden
- Defensive coordinator: Todd Wash
- Home stadium: TIAA Bank Field

Results
- Record: 1–15
- Division place: 4th AFC South
- Playoffs: Did not qualify
- Pro Bowlers: None

Uniform
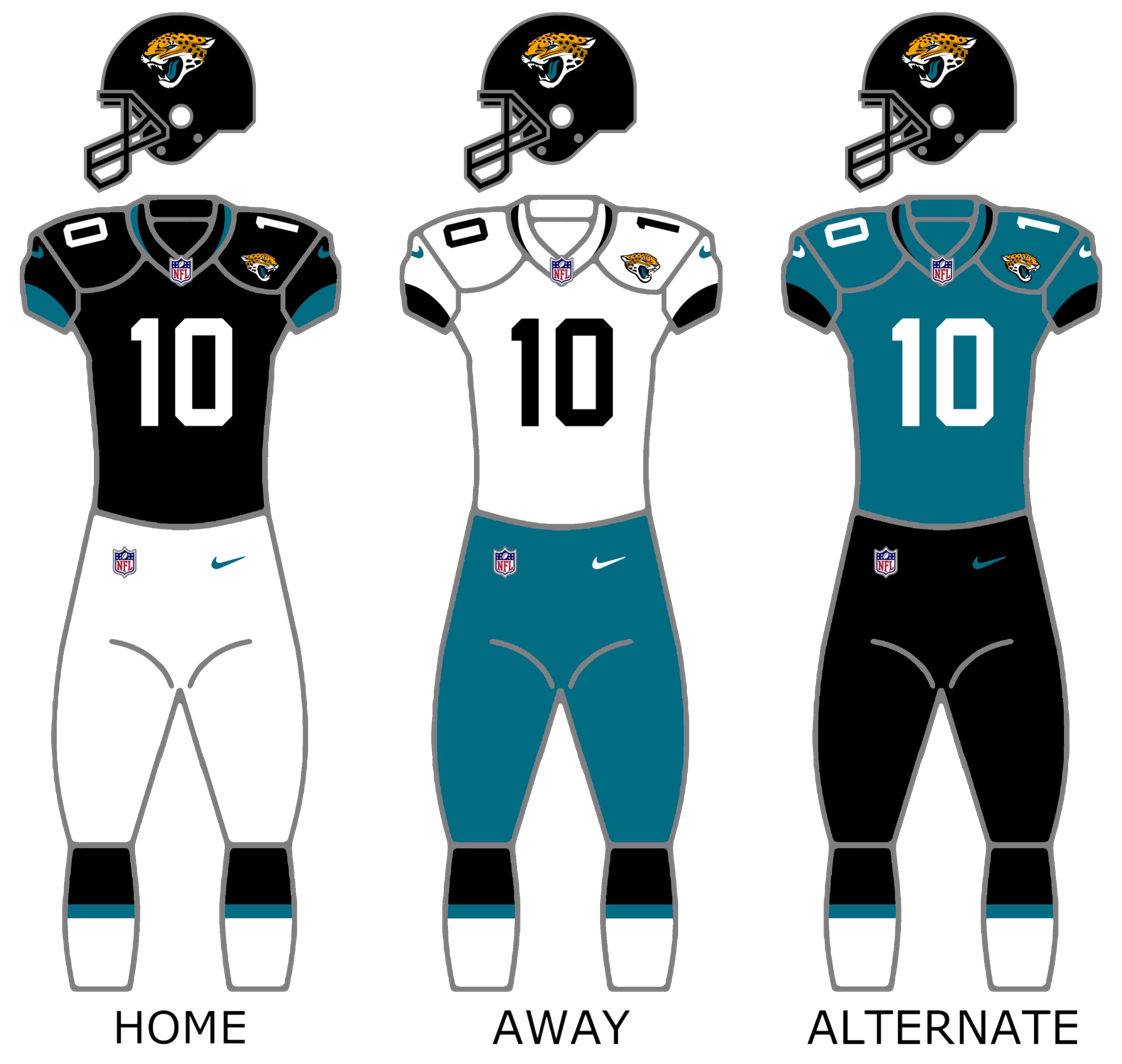

The 2020 season was the Jacksonville Jaguars' 26th season in the National Football League (NFL), their eighth and final season under general manager David Caldwell and their fourth and final season under head coach Doug Marrone. With a Week 11 loss to the Pittsburgh Steelers, the Jaguars dropped to 1–9, resulting in their third consecutive losing season and ninth in ten seasons. After a loss to the Cleveland Browns in Week 12, the Jaguars both failed to improve on their 6–10 record from the previous season and were eliminated from playoff contention for the third consecutive season. They surpassed their loss total from the previous season after an overtime loss to the Minnesota Vikings.

On November 29, 2020, the Jaguars fired general manager David Caldwell following a 1–10 start to the season.

The Jaguars had the worst record in the 2020 season, earning the first overall draft pick for the first time in franchise history after a Week 16 loss to the Chicago Bears, coupled with a win by the New York Jets. Following their Week 17 loss to the Indianapolis Colts, the Jaguars became the fourth team in NFL history (and the second since the 16-game expansion) to win their season opener but lose their remaining games; the only other teams that accomplished this were the 1936 Philadelphia Eagles, the 1969 Pittsburgh Steelers, and the 2001 Carolina Panthers. The 1–15 record was also the worst in franchise history. With the NFL extending to a 17-game season beginning the next season, the 2020 Jaguars became the last team to ever finish with a 1–15 record.

On January 4, 2021, the Jaguars fired head coach Doug Marrone, who finished his tenure in Jacksonville with a 25–44 (.362) record.

== Offseason ==
=== NFL draft ===
2020 Jacksonville Jaguars draft
Round	Pick	Player	Position	College	Notes
1	9	C. J. Henderson	CB	Florida	
1	20	K'Lavon Chaisson	OLB	LSU	From Rams
2	42	Laviska Shenault	WR	Colorado	
3	73	DaVon Hamilton	DT	Ohio State	
4	116	Ben Bartch	OT	Saint John's	
4	137	Josiah Scott	CB	Michigan State	From 49ers via Broncos
4	140	Shaquille Quarterman	ILB	Miami	From Bears
5	157	Daniel Thomas	S	Auburn	From Ravens via Falcons
5	165	Collin Johnson	WR	Texas	From Rams
6	189	Jake Luton	QB	Oregon State	
6	206	Tyler Davis	TE	Georgia Tech	From Seahawks
7	223	Chris Claybrooks	CB	Memphis	

Pre-draft trades

- The Los Angeles Rams traded their 2019 third-round selection and their 2020 fifth-round selection to Jacksonville in exchange for defensive end Dante Fowler.
- The Seahawks traded their 2020 sixth-round selection to Jacksonville in exchange for Jacksonville's 2019 seventh-round selection.
- The Jaguars traded their fifth-round selection to Pittsburgh in exchange for quarterback Joshua Dobbs.
- The Rams traded their first-round selection and their 2021 first and fourth-round selections to Jacksonville in exchange for cornerback Jalen Ramsey.
- The Jaguars traded cornerback A. J. Bouye to Denver in exchange for a fourth-round pick.
- The Jaguars traded quarterback Nick Foles to Chicago in exchange for a fourth-round pick.
- The Jaguars traded defensive end Calais Campbell to Baltimore in exchange for a fifth-round selection.

== Staff ==
2020 Jacksonville Jaguars staff
Front office: Owner – Shahid Khan; President – Mark Lamping; General manager – Trent Baalke (interim); Senior vice president of football administration & technology – Tony Khan; Special assistant to the general manager – John Idzik Jr.; Director of football administration – Tim Walsh; Director of football operations – Hamzah Ahmad; Director of player personnel – Trent Baalke; Assistant director of player personnel – Andy Dengler; Director of pro personnel – Chris Driggers; Assistant director of pro personnel – DeJuan Polk; Director of college scouting – Mark Ellenz; Assistant director of college scouting – Paul Roell; Director of player development and youth football – Marcus Pollard; Assistant to the head coach & administrator of coaching operations – ElizaBeth Mayers; Director of team administration – Tyler Wolf; Head coaches: Head coach – Doug Marrone; Offensive coaches: Offensive coordinator – Jay Gruden; Quarterbacks – Ben McAdoo; Running backs – Terry Robiskie; Wide receivers – Keenan McCardell; Tight ends – Ron Middleton; Offensive line – George Warhop; Assistant offensive line – Tony Sparano Jr.; Offensive assistant – Chris O'Hara; Offensive quality control – Denard Robinson; Offense-research – Eric Price	Defensive coaches: Defensive coordinator – Todd Wash; Defensive line – Jason Rebrovich; Linebackers – Mark Collins; Assistant linebackers – Tony Gilbert; Cornerbacks – Tim Walton; Safeties – Joe Danna; Defensive assistant – Dwayne Stukes; Special teams coaches: Special teams coordinator – Joe DeCamillis; Assistant special teams coordinator – Mike Mallory; Strength and conditioning: Strength and conditioning – Tom Myslinski; Assistant strength and conditioning – Cedric Scott; Strength and conditioning associate – Sean Karpf; Strength and conditioning associate – Jess Langvardt

== Final roster ==
2020 Jacksonville Jaguars roster
Quarterbacks (QB): 2 Mike Glennon; 6 Jake Luton; 15 Gardner Minshew; Running backs (RB): 31 Nathan Cottrell; 33 Dare Ogunbowale; 22 Devine Ozigbo; 30 James Robinson; Wide receivers (WR): 17 D. J. Chark; 84 Keelan Cole; 18 Chris Conley; 14 Terry Godwin; 10 Laviska Shenault; Tight ends (TE): 87 Tyler Davis; 88 Tyler Eifert; 80 James O'Shaughnessy; 85 Eric Saubert	Offensive linemen (OL): 60 A. J. Cann G; 77 Derwin Gray T (Exempt); 62 K. C. McDermott C/G; 68 Andrew Norwell G; 76 Will Richardson T; 74 Cam Robinson T; 69 Tyler Shatley C/G; 75 Jawaan Taylor T; Defensive linemen (DL): 90 Taven Bryan DT; 45 K'Lavon Chaisson DE; 58 Doug Costin DT; 99 Daniel Ekuale DT; 96 Adam Gotsis DE; 59 Aaron Lynch DE; 92 Caraun Reid DT; 93 Daniel Ross DT; 94 Dawuane Smoot DE	Linebackers (LB): 53 Dakota Allen OLB; 43 Joe Giles-Harris OLB; 44 Myles Jack OLB; 50 Shaq Quarterman MLB; 47 Joe Schobert MLB; 56 Quincy Williams OLB; Defensive backs (DB): 36 Luq Barcoo CB; 27 Chris Claybrooks CB; 37 Tre Herndon CB; 29 Josh Jones SS; 34 Greg Mabin CB; 5 Quenton Meeks CB; 39 Doug Middleton SS; 40 Brandon Rusnak FS; 24 Josiah Scott CB; 26 Jarrod Wilson FS; 42 Andrew Wingard FS; Special teams (ST): 1 Dustin Colquitt P; 9 Logan Cooke P; 46 Ross Matiscik LS; 7 Aldrick Rosas K	Practice squad: 67 Evan Boehm G/C; 57 Nate Evans MLB; 81 Josh Hammond WR; 83 Bug Howard TE; 66 Garrett McGhin T; 32 Nate Meadors SS; 49 Bruce Miller FB; 3 Cameron Nizialek P; 38 Josh Nurse CB; 91 Aaron Patrick DE; 64 Austen Pleasants T; 16 Trey Quinn WR (PS/I); 48 Craig Reynolds RB; 77 Tre'Vour Wallace-Simms G; 11 Damion Willis WR; 98 Gabe Wright DT; Reserve: 41 Josh Allen DE (IR); 21 Ryquell Armstead RB (COVID-19); 78 Ben Bartch G (COVID-19); 55 Kamalei Correa OLB (Left squad); 86 Ben Ellefson TE (IR); 52 DaVon Hamilton DT (IR); 25 D. J. Hayden CB (IR); 23 C. J. Henderson CB (IR); 48 Leon Jacobs OLB (IR); 19 Collin Johnson WR (IR); 95 Abry Jones DT (IR/DFR); 35 Sidney Jones CB (IR); 4 Josh Lambo K (IR); 65 Brandon Linder C (IR); 55 Lerentee McCray DE (Opt-out); 31 Rashaan Melvin CB (Opt-out); 89 Josh Oliver TE (IR); 98 Dontavius Russell DT (IR); 20 Daniel Thomas SS (IR); 34 Chris Thompson RB (IR); 12 Dede Westbrook WR (IR); 97 Al Woods DT (Opt-out); Rookies in italics 53 active (1 exempt), 22 reserve, 15 practice squad (1 exempt)

== Preseason ==
The Jaguars' preseason schedule was announced on May 7, but was later cancelled due to the COVID-19 pandemic.

Week	Date	Opponent	Venue	Result
1	August 13	at Carolina Panthers	Bank of America Stadium	Cancelled due to the COVID-19 pandemic
2	August 22	at Tampa Bay Buccaneers	Raymond James Stadium	Cancelled due to the COVID-19 pandemic
3	August 29	Washington Football Team	TIAA Bank Field	Cancelled due to the COVID-19 pandemic
4	September 3	Atlanta Falcons	TIAA Bank Field	Cancelled due to the COVID-19 pandemic

== Regular season ==
=== Schedule ===
The Jaguars' 2020 schedule was announced on May 7.

Week	Date	Opponent	Result	Record	Venue	Recap
1	September 13	**Indianapolis Colts**	**W** 27–20	1–0	TIAA Bank Field	Recap
2	September 20	at **Tennessee Titans**	**L** 30–33	1–1	Nissan Stadium	Recap
3	September 24	Miami Dolphins	**L** 13–31	1–2	TIAA Bank Field	Recap
4	October 4	at Cincinnati Bengals	**L** 25–33	1–3	Paul Brown Stadium	Recap
5	October 11	at **Houston Texans**	**L** 14–30	1–4	NRG Stadium	Recap
6	October 18	Detroit Lions	**L** 16–34	1–5	TIAA Bank Field	Recap
7	October 25	at Los Angeles Chargers	**L** 29–39	1–6	SoFi Stadium	Recap
8	Bye					
9	November 8	**Houston Texans**	**L** 25–27	1–7	TIAA Bank Field	Recap
10	November 15	at Green Bay Packers	**L** 20–24	1–8	Lambeau Field	Recap
11	November 22	Pittsburgh Steelers	**L** 3–27	1–9	TIAA Bank Field	Recap
12	November 29	Cleveland Browns	**L** 25–27	1–10	TIAA Bank Field	Recap
13	December 6	at Minnesota Vikings	**L** 24–27 (OT)	1–11	U.S. Bank Stadium	Recap
14	December 13	**Tennessee Titans**	**L** 10–31	1–12	TIAA Bank Field	Recap
15	December 20	at Baltimore Ravens	**L** 14–40	1–13	M&T Bank Stadium	Recap
16	December 27	Chicago Bears	**L** 17–41	1–14	TIAA Bank Field	Recap
17	January 3	at **Indianapolis Colts**	**L** 14–28	1–15	Lucas Oil Stadium	Recap

Note: Intra-division opponents are in bold text.

=== Game summaries ===
==== Week 1: vs. Indianapolis Colts ====
Week One: Indianapolis Colts at Jacksonville Jaguars – Game summary

Quarter	1	2	3	4	Total
Colts	7	10	0	3	**20**
**Jaguars**	0	14	3	10	**27**

at TIAA Bank Field, Jacksonville, Florida

- Date: September 13
- Game time: 1:00 p.m. EDT
- Game weather: Cloudy, 80 °F (27 °C)
- Game attendance: 14,100
- Referee: John Hussey
- TV announcers (CBS): Spero Dedes and Adam Archuleta
- Recap, Game Book

Game information

**First quarter**

- IND – Nyheim Hines 12-yard run (Rodrigo Blankenship kick), 11:42. Colts 7–0. **Drive: 7 plays, 63 yards, 3:18.**

**Second quarter**

- JAX – D. J. Chark 6-yard pass from Gardner Minshew (Josh Lambo kick), 10:42. Tied 7–7. **Drive: 4 plays, 27 yards, 2:08.**
- IND – Nyheim Hines 8-yard pass from Philip Rivers (Rodrigo Blankenship kick), 4:45. Colts 14–7. **Drive: 11 plays, 75 yards, 5:57.**
- JAX – Laviska Shenault 15-yard pass from Gardner Minshew (Josh Lambo kick), 1:38. Tied 14–14. **Drive: 9 plays, 75 yards, 3:07.**
- IND – Rodrigo Blankenship 38-yard field goal, 0:05. Colts 17–14. **Drive: 7 plays, 47 yards, 1:33.**

**Third quarter**

- JAX – Josh Lambo 50-yard field goal, 3:30. Tied 17–17. **Drive: 7 plays, 18 yards, 4:12.**

**Fourth quarter**

- IND – Rodrigo Blankenship 25-yard field goal, 9:39. Colts 20–17. **Drive: 14 plays, 71 yards, 8:51.**
- JAX – Keelan Cole 22-yard pass from Gardner Minshew (Josh Lambo kick), 5:56. Jaguars 24–20. **Drive: 6 plays, 60 yards, 3:43.**
- JAX – Josh Lambo 46-yard field goal, 2:50. Jaguars 27–20. **Drive: 4 plays, 3 yards, 1:34.**

**Top passers**

- IND – Philip Rivers – 36/46, 363 yards, TD, 2 INT
- JAX – Gardner Minshew – 19/20, 173 yards, 3 TD

**Top rushers**

- IND – Nyheim Hines – 7 rushes, 28 yards, TD
- JAX – James Robinson – 16 rushes, 62 yards

**Top receivers**

- IND – Parris Campbell – 6 receptions, 71 yards
- JAX – Keelan Cole – 5 receptions, 47 yards, TD

==== Week 2: at Tennessee Titans ====
Week Two: Jacksonville Jaguars at Tennessee Titans – Game summary

Quarter	1	2	3	4	Total
Jaguars	7	3	7	13	**30**
**Titans**	14	10	6	3	**33**

at Nissan Stadium, Nashville, Tennessee

- Date: September 20
- Game time: 1:00 p.m. EDT/12:00 p.m. CDT
- Game weather: Sunny, 72 °F (22 °C)
- Game attendance: 7
- Referee: Clay Martin
- TV announcers (CBS): Andrew Catalon, James Lofton and A.J. Ross
- Recap, Game Book

Game information

**First quarter**

- TEN – Jonnu Smith 13-yard pass from Ryan Tannehill (Stephen Gostkowski kick), 13:22. Titans 7–0. **Drive: 3 plays, 77 yards, 1:38.**
- TEN – Corey Davis 9-yard pass from Ryan Tannehill (Stephen Gostkowski kick), 5:43. Titans 14–0. **Drive: 5 plays, 30 yards, 1:56.**
- JAX – Tyler Eifert 19-yard pass from Gardner Minshew (Josh Lambo kick), 3:43. Titans 14–7. **Drive: 6 plays, 75 yards, 2:00.**

**Second quarter**

- TEN – Jonnu Smith 4-yard pass from Ryan Tannehill (Stephen Gostkowski kick), 1:47. Titans 21–7. **Drive: 3 plays, 77 yards, 5:50.**
- JAX – Josh Lambo 35-yard field goal, 0:12. Titans 21–10. **Drive: 10 plays, 58 yards, 1:35.**
- TEN – Stephen Gostkowski 51-yard field goal, 0:00. Titans 24–10. **Drive: 2 plays, 16 yards, 0:12.**

**Third quarter**

- JAX – James Robinson 17-yard run (Josh Lambo kick), 7:04. Titans 24–17. **Drive: 14 plays, 89 yards, 7:56.**
- TEN – Adam Humphries 18-yard pass from Ryan Tannehill (kick failed), 2:04. Titans 30–17. **Drive: 9 plays, 75 yards, 5:00.**

**Fourth quarter**

- JAX – Keelan Cole 2-yard pass from Gardner Minshew (kick failed), 14:16. Titans 30–23. **Drive: 7 plays, 75 yards, 2:48.**
- JAX – Chris Thompson 14-yard pass from Gardner Minshew (Josh Lambo kick), 7:25. Tied 30–30. **Drive: 9 plays, 86 yards, 5:02.**
- TEN – Stephen Gostkowski 49-yard field goal, 1:36. Titans 33–30. **Drive: 8 plays, 29 yards, 1:53.**

**Top passers**

- JAX – Gardner Minshew – 30/45, 339 yards, 3 TD, 2 INT
- TEN – Ryan Tannehill – 18/24, 239 yards, 4 TD

**Top rushers**

- JAX – James Robinson – 16 rushes, 102 yards, TD
- TEN – Derrick Henry – 24 rushes, 84 yards

**Top receivers**

- JAX – D. J. Chark – 4 receptions, 84 yards
- TEN – Jonnu Smith – 4 receptions, 84 yards, 2 TD

==== Week 3: vs. Miami Dolphins ====
Week Three: Miami Dolphins at Jacksonville Jaguars – Game summary

Quarter	1	2	3	4	Total
**Dolphins**	14	7	7	3	**31**
Jaguars	0	7	0	6	**13**

at TIAA Bank Field, Jacksonville, Florida

- Date: September 24
- Game time: 8:20 p.m. EDT
- Game weather: Partly cloudy, 81 °F (27 °C)
- Game attendance: 16,563
- Referee: Brad Allen
- TV announcers (NFLN): Joe Buck, Troy Aikman, Erin Andrews, and Kristina Pink
- Recap, Game Book

Game information

**First quarter**

- MIA – Preston Williams 3-yard pass from Ryan Fitzpatrick (Jason Sanders kick), 8:09. Dolphins 7–0. **Drive: 12 plays, 84 yards, 6:51.**
- MIA – Jordan Howard 1-yard run (Jason Sanders kick), 2:37. Dolphins 14–0. **Drive: 6 plays, 80 yards, 3:17.**

**Second quarter**

- JAX – James Robinson 11-yard run (Brandon Wright kick), 13:04. Dolphins 14–7. **Drive: 9 plays, 75 yards, 4:33.**
- MIA – Mike Gesicki 15-yard pass from Ryan Fitzpatrick (Jason Sanders kick), 5:58. Dolphins 21–7. **Drive: 11 plays, 75 yards, 7:06.**

**Third quarter**

- MIA – Ryan Fitzpatrick 1-yard run (Jason Sanders kick), 2:01. Dolphins 28–7. **Drive: 4 plays, 5 yards, 2:03.**

**Fourth quarter**

- JAX – James Robinson 1-yard run (kick failed), 9:03. Dolphins 28–13. **Drive: 10 plays, 51 yards, 3:11.**
- MIA – Jason Sanders 30-yard field goal, 3:49. Dolphins 31–13. **Drive: 4 plays, 7 yards, 0:58.**

**Top passers**

- MIA – Ryan Fitzpatrick – 18/20, 160 yards, 2 TD
- JAX – Gardner Minshew – 30/42, 275 yards, INT

**Top rushers**

- MIA – Myles Gaskin – 22 rushes, 66 yards
- JAX – James Robinson – 11 rushes, 46 yards, 2 TD

**Top receivers**

- MIA – DeVante Parker – 5 receptions, 69 yards
- JAX – James Robinson – 6 receptions, 83 yards

==== Week 4: at Cincinnati Bengals ====
Week Four: Jacksonville Jaguars at Cincinnati Bengals – Game summary

Quarter	1	2	3	4	Total
Jaguars	7	6	0	12	**25**
**Bengals**	3	7	17	6	**33**

at Paul Brown Stadium, Cincinnati, Ohio

- Date: October 4
- Game time: 1:00 p.m. EDT
- Game weather: Cloudy, 64 °F (18 °C)
- Game attendance: 6,243
- Referee: Alex Kemp
- TV announcers (CBS): Tom McCarthy and Jay Feely
- Recap, Game Book

Game information

**First quarter**

- CIN – Randy Bullock 35-yard field goal, 2:41. Bengals 3–0. **Drive: 9 plays, 45 yards, 3:57.**
- JAX – D. J. Chark 11-yard pass from Gardner Minshew (Aldrick Rosas kick), 0:21. Jaguars 7–3. **Drive: 5 plays, 75 yards, 2:20.**

**Second quarter**

- JAX – Aldrick Rosas 32-yard field goal, 3:45. Jaguars 10–3. **Drive: 11 plays, 66 yards, 5:36.**
- CIN – Joe Mixon 9-yard pass from Joe Burrow (Randy Bullock kick), 0:56. Tied 10–10. **Drive: 9 plays, 75 yards, 2:49.**
- JAX – Aldrick Rosas 20-yard field goal, 0:03. Jaguars 13–10. **Drive: 8 plays, 73 yards, 0:53.**

**Third quarter**

- CIN – Joe Mixon 34-yard run (Randy Bullock kick), 12:29. Bengals 17–13. **Drive: 5 plays, 75 yards, 2:31.**
- CIN – Joe Mixon 23-yard run (Randy Bullock kick), 8:28. Bengals 24–13. **Drive: 7 plays, 56 yards, 3:09.**
- CIN – Randy Bullock 40-yard field goal, 3:29. Bengals 27–13. **Drive: 8 plays, 37 yards, 3:25.**

**Fourth quarter**

- JAX – Aldrick Rosas 50-yard field goal, 14:33. Bengals 27–16. **Drive: 9 plays, 43 yards, 3:56.**
- CIN – Randy Bullock 46-yard field goal, 9:20. Bengals 30–16. **Drive: 10 plays, 47 yards, 5:13.**
- JAX – D. J. Chark 2-yard pass from Gardner Minshew (pass failed), 6:17. Bengals 30–22. **Drive: 8 plays, 75 yards, 3:06.**
- CIN – Randy Bullock 30-yard field goal, 1:46. Bengals 33–22. **Drive: 10 plays, 66 yards, 4:28.**
- JAX – Aldrick Rosas 30-yard field goal, 0:08. Bengals 33–25. **Drive: 6 plays, 63 yards, 1:38.**

**Top passers**

- JAX – Gardner Minshew – 27/40, 351 yards, 2 TD, INT
- CIN – Joe Burrow – 25/36, 300 yards, TD, INT

**Top rushers**

- JAX – James Robinson – 17 rushes, 75 yards
- CIN – Joe Mixon – 25 rushes, 151 yards, 2 TD

**Top receivers**

- JAX – D. J. Chark – 8 receptions, 95 yards, 2 TD
- CIN – Tyler Boyd – 7 receptions, 90 yards

==== Week 5: at Houston Texans ====
Week Five: Jacksonville Jaguars at Houston Texans – Game summary

Quarter	1	2	3	4	Total
Jaguars	0	7	0	7	**14**
**Texans**	0	10	3	17	**30**

at NRG Stadium, Houston, Texas

- Date: October 11
- Game time: 1:00 p.m. EDT/12:00 p.m. CDT
- Game weather: None (retractable roof closed)
- Game attendance: 12,413
- Referee: Bill Vinovich
- TV announcers (CBS): Andrew Catalon, James Lofton and Sherree Burruss
- Recap, Game Book

Game information

**First quarter**

- No scoring plays.

**Second quarter**

- HOU – Kaʻimi Fairbairn 36-yard field goal, 14:07. Texans 3–0. **Drive: 17 plays, 73 yards, 7:35.**
- JAX – Keelan Cole 13-yard pass from Gardner Minshew (Stephen Hauschka kick), 6:33. Jaguars 7–3. **Drive: 12 plays, 75 yards, 7:34.**
- HOU – Darren Fells 44-yard pass from Deshaun Watson (Kaʻimi Fairbairn kick), 4:32. Texans 10–7. **Drive: 4 plays, 75 yards, 2:01.**

**Third quarter**

- HOU – Kaʻimi Fairbairn 33-yard field goal, 11:35. Texans 13–7. **Drive: 9 plays, 60 yards, 3:25.**

**Fourth quarter**

- HOU – Will Fuller 19-yard pass from Deshaun Watson (Kaʻimi Fairbairn kick), 14:16. Texans 20–7. **Drive: 8 plays, 90 yards, 4:00.**
- JAX – Collin Johnson 4-yard pass from Gardner Minshew (Stephen Hauschka kick), 10:18. Texans 20–14. **Drive: 10 plays, 75 yards, 3:58.**
- HOU – Kaʻimi Fairbairn 46-yard field goal, 7:29. Texans 23–14. **Drive: 6 plays, 47 yards, 2:49.**
- HOU – Brandin Cooks 28-yard pass from Deshaun Watson (Kaʻimi Fairbairn kick), 4:39. Texans 30–14. **Drive: 4 plays, 34 yards, 1:35.**

**Top passers**

- JAX – Gardner Minshew – 31/49, 301 yards, 2 TD
- HOU – Deshaun Watson – 25/35, 359 yards, 3 TD, 2 INT

**Top rushers**

- JAX – James Robinson – 13 rushes, 48 yards
- HOU – David Johnson – 17 rushes, 96 yards

**Top receivers**

- JAX – Laviska Shenault – 7 receptions, 79 yards
- HOU – Brandin Cooks – 8 receptions, 161 yards, TD

==== Week 6: vs. Detroit Lions ====
Week Six: Detroit Lions at Jacksonville Jaguars – Game summary

Quarter	1	2	3	4	Total
**Lions**	7	10	7	10	**34**
Jaguars	3	0	7	6	**16**

at TIAA Bank Field, Jacksonville, Florida

- Date: October 18
- Game time: 1:00 p.m. EDT
- Game weather: Cloudy, 78 °F (26 °C)
- Game attendance: 14,513
- Referee: Shawn Hochuli
- TV announcers (Fox): Chris Myers, Greg Jennings, Brock Huard and Jen Hale
- Recap, Game Book

Game information

**First quarter**

- DET – Adrian Peterson 1-yard run (Matt Prater kick), 7:37. Lions 7–0. **Drive: 10 plays, 50 yards, 5:09.**
- JAX – Jon Brown 31-yard field goal, 1:51. Lions 7–3. **Drive: 11 plays, 62 yards, 5:46.**

**Second quarter**

- DET – D'Andre Swift 1-yard run (Matt Prater kick), 13:41. Lions 14–3. **Drive: 6 plays, 75 yards, 3:10.**
- DET – Matt Prater 31-yard field goal, 1:53. Lions 17–3. **Drive: 11 plays, 65 yards, 6:09.**

**Third quarter**

- DET – T. J. Hockenson 1-yard pass from Matthew Stafford (Matt Prater kick), 7:44. Lions 24–3. **Drive: 9 plays, 86 yards, 3:56.**
- JAX – Gardner Minshew 6-yard run (Jon Brown kick), 3:31. Lions 24–10. **Drive: 8 plays, 74 yards, 4:13.**

**Fourth quarter**

- DET – D'Andre Swift 6-yard run (Matt Prater kick), 13:32. Lions 31–10. **Drive: 9 plays, 75 yards, 4:59.**
- DET – Matt Prater 41-yard field goal, 8:11. Lions 34–10. **Drive: 8 plays, 41 yards, 4:14.**
- JAX – James Robinson 14-yard pass from Gardner Minshew (pass failed), 5:18. Lions 34–16. **Drive: 9 plays, 80 yards, 2:53.**

**Top passers**

- JAX – Gardner Minshew – 25/44, 243 yards, TD, INT
- DET – Matthew Stafford – 19/31, 223 yards, TD, INT

**Top rushers**

- JAX – James Robinson – 12 rushes, 29 yards
- DET – D'Andre Swift – 14 rushes, 116 yards, 2 TD

**Top receivers**

- JAX – Keelan Cole – 6 receptions, 143 yards
- DET – Kenny Golladay – 4 receptions, 105 yards

==== Week 7: at Los Angeles Chargers ====
Week Seven: Jacksonville Jaguars at Los Angeles Chargers – Game summary

Quarter	1	2	3	4	Total
Jaguars	0	14	15	0	**29**
**Chargers**	9	7	20	3	**39**

at SoFi Stadium, Inglewood, California

- Date: October 25
- Game time: 4:25 p.m. EDT/1:25 p.m. PDT
- Game weather: Cloudy, 68 °F (20 °C)
- Game attendance: 0
- Referee: Clete Blakeman
- TV announcers (CBS): Andrew Catalon, James Lofton and Sherree Burruss
- Recap, Game Book

Game information

**First quarter**

- LAC – Michael Badgley 35-yard field goal, 10:15. Chargers 3–0. **Drive: 9 plays, 77 yards, 3:48.**
- LAC – Joe Reed 7-yard run (kick failed), 0:05. Chargers 9–0. **Drive: 11 plays, 71 yards, 5:39.**

**Second quarter**

- LAC – Donald Parham 22-yard pass from Justin Herbert (Michael Badgley kick), 10:34. Chargers 16–0. **Drive: 6 plays, 62 yards, 2:59.**
- JAX – James Robinson 4-yard run (run succeeded), 7:46. Chargers 16–8. **Drive: 6 plays, 78 yards, 2:48.**
- JAX – James Robinson 9-yard pass from Gardner Minshew (pass failed), 0:11. Chargers 16–14. **Drive: 11 plays, 67 yards, 3:41.**

**Third quarter**

- JAX – Daniel Thomas 16-yard return of blocked punt (Josh Lambo kick), 13:21. Jaguars 21–16.
- LAC – Virgil Green 22-yard pass from Justin Herbert (run failed), 5:25. Chargers 22–21. **Drive: 6 plays, 47 yards, 2:56.**
- JAX – Chris Conley 28-yard pass from Gardner Minshew (pass succeeded), 2:54. Jaguars 29–22. **Drive: 6 plays, 74 yards, 2:31.**
- LAC – Jalen Guyton 70-yard pass from Justin Herbert (Michael Badgley kick), 1:56. Tied 29–29. **Drive: 2 plays, 80 yards, 0:58.**
- LAC – Justin Herbert 5-yard run (Michael Badgley kick), 0:05. Chargers 36–29. **Drive: 4 plays, 19 yards, 1:42.**

**Fourth quarter**

- LAC – Michael Badgley 35-yard field goal, 6:26. Chargers 39–29. **Drive: 11 plays, 73 yards, 4:36.**

**Top passers**

- JAX – Gardner Minshew – 14/27, 173 yards, 2 TD
- LAC – Justin Herbert – 27/43, 347 yards, 3 TD

**Top rushers**

- JAX – James Robinson – 22 rushes, 119 yards, TD
- LAC – Justin Herbert – 9 rushes, 66 yards

**Top receivers**

- JAX – Laviska Shenault – 3 receptions, 44 yards
- LAC – Keenan Allen – 10 receptions, 125 yards

==== Week 9: vs. Houston Texans ====
Week Nine: Houston Texans at Jacksonville Jaguars – Game summary

Quarter	1	2	3	4	Total
**Texans**	10	10	7	0	**27**
Jaguars	7	9	3	6	**25**

at TIAA Bank Field, Jacksonville, Florida

- Date: November 8
- Game time: 1:00 p.m. EST
- Game weather: Partly Cloudy, 79 °F (26 °C)
- Game attendance: 15,668
- Referee: Brad Allen
- TV announcers (CBS): Spero Dedes and Adam Archuleta
- Recap, Game Book

Game information

**First quarter**

- JAX – D. J. Chark 73-yard pass from Jake Luton (Josh Lambo kick), 14:19. Jaguars 7–0. **Drive: 3 plays, 75 yards, 0:52.**
- HOU – Brandin Cooks 57-yard pass from Deshaun Watson (Kaʻimi Fairbairn kick), 13:33. Tied 7–7. **Drive: 2 plays, 75 yards, 0:35.**
- HOU – Kaʻimi Fairbairn 54-yard field goal, 9:52. Texans 10–7. **Drive: 6 plays, 45 yards, 2:45.**

**Second quarter**

- HOU – Kaʻimi Fairbairn 30-yard field goal, 12:29. Texans 13–7. **Drive: 14 plays, 59 yards, 6:01.**
- JAX – James Robinson 1-yard run (kick failed), 5:44. Tied 13–13. **Drive: 12 plays, 75 yards, 6:45.**
- HOU – Duke Johnson 1-yard run (Kaʻimi Fairbairn kick), 0:30. Texans 20–13. **Drive: 6 plays, 98 yards, 1:44.**
- JAX – Josh Lambo 59-yard field goal, 0:02. Texans 20–16. **Drive: 3 plays, 18 yards, 0:27.**

**Third quarter**

- HOU – Will Fuller 77-yard pass from Deshaun Watson (Kaʻimi Fairbairn kick), 6:15. Texans 27–16. **Drive: 3 plays, 81 yards, 1:21.**
- JAX – Josh Lambo 30-yard field goal, 1:13. Texans 27–19. **Drive: 9 plays, 63 yards, 4:54.**

**Fourth quarter**

- JAX – Jake Luton 13-yard run (pass failed), 1:30. Texans 27–25. **Drive: 7 plays, 80 yards, 1:27.**

**Top passers**

- HOU – Deshaun Watson – 19/32, 281 yards, 2 TD
- JAX – Jake Luton – 26/38, 304 yards, TD, INT

**Top rushers**

- HOU – Deshaun Watson – 10 rushes, 50 yards
- JAX – James Robinson – 25 rushes, 99 yards, TD

**Top receivers**

- HOU – Will Fuller – 5 receptions, 100 yards, TD
- JAX – D. J. Chark – 7 receptions, 146 yards, TD

==== Week 10: at Green Bay Packers ====
Week Ten: Jacksonville Jaguars at Green Bay Packers – Game summary

Quarter	1	2	3	4	Total
Jaguars	3	7	7	3	**20**
**Packers**	0	17	0	7	**24**

at Lambeau Field, Green Bay, Wisconsin

- Date: November 15
- Game time: 1:00 p.m. EST/12:00 p.m. CST
- Game weather: Cloudy, 38 °F (3 °C)
- Game attendance: 0
- Referee: Shawn Smith
- TV announcers (Fox): Chris Myers, Greg Jennings, Brock Huard and Jen Hale
- Recap, Game Book

Game information

**First quarter**

- JAX – Chase McLaughlin 52-yard field goal, 10:36. Jaguars 3–0. **Drive: 7 plays, 29 yards, 2:46.**

**Second quarter**

- GB – Marquez Valdes-Scantling 78-yard pass from Aaron Rodgers (Mason Crosby kick), 14:47. Packers 7–3. **Drive: 4 plays, 91 yards, 2:00.**
- JAX – Keelan Cole 91-yard punt return (Chase McLaughlin kick), 10:06. Jaguars 10–7.
- GB – Aaron Rodgers 5-yard run (Mason Crosby run), 2:15. Packers 14–10. **Drive: 13 plays, 81 yards, 7:51.**
- GB – Mason Crosby 39-yard field goal, 0:02. Packers 17–10. **Drive: 6 plays, 5 yards, 1:26.**

**Third quarter**

- JAX – Keelan Cole 12-yard pass from Jake Luton (Chase McLaughlin kick), 10:30. Tied 17–17. **Drive: 3 plays, 16 yards, 1:26.**

**Fourth quarter**

- JAX – Chase McLaughlin 31-yard field goal, 12:40. Jaguars 20–17. **Drive: 7 plays, 43 yards, 3:36.**
- GB – Davante Adams 6-yard pass from Aaron Rodgers (Mason Crosby kick), 9:03. Packers 24–20. **Drive: 7 plays, 75 yards, 3:37.**

**Top passers**

- JAX – Jake Luton – 18/35, 169 yards, TD, INT
- GB – Aaron Rodgers – 24/34, 325 yards, 2 TD, INT

**Top rushers**

- JAX – James Robinson – 23 rushes, 109 yards
- GB – Aaron Jones – 13 rushes, 46 yards

**Top receivers**

- JAX – D. J. Chark – 4 receptions, 56 yards
- GB – Marquez Valdes-Scantling – 4 receptions, 149 yards, TD

==== Week 11: vs. Pittsburgh Steelers ====
Week Eleven: Pittsburgh Steelers at Jacksonville Jaguars – Game summary

Quarter	1	2	3	4	Total
**Steelers**	0	17	0	10	**27**
Jaguars	3	0	0	0	**3**

at TIAA Bank Field, Jacksonville, Florida

- Date: November 22
- Game time: 1:00 p.m. EST
- Game weather: Cloudy, 72 °F (22 °C)
- Game attendance: 17,244
- Referee: Scott Novak
- TV announcers (CBS): Ian Eagle, Charles Davis and Evan Washburn
- Recap, Game Book

Game information

**First quarter**

- JAX – Chase McLaughlin 41-yard field goal, 10:57. Jaguars 3–0. **Drive: 9 plays, 52 yards, 4:03.**

**Second quarter**

- PIT – Chris Boswell 44-yard field goal, 10:45. Tied 3–3. **Drive: 9 plays, 50 yards, 4:15.**
- PIT – Chase Claypool 31-yard pass from Ben Roethlisberger (Chris Boswell kick), 7:00. Steelers 10–3. **Drive: 6 plays, 71 yards, 2:49.**
- PIT – Benny Snell 1-yard run (Chris Boswell kick), 0:44. Steelers 17–3. **Drive: 7 plays, 61 yards, 2:13.**

**Third quarter**

- No scoring plays

**Fourth quarter**

- PIT – Chris Boswell 47-yard field goal, 10:21. Steelers 20–3. **Drive: 9 plays, 45 yards, 3:50.**
- PIT – Eric Ebron 20-yard pass from Ben Roethlisberger (Chris Boswell kick), 6:40. Steelers 27–3. **Drive: 4 plays, 50 yards, 1:52.**

**Top passers**

- PIT – Ben Roethlisberger – 32/46, 267 yards, 2 TD, INT
- JAX – Jake Luton – 16/37, 151 yards, 4 INT

**Top rushers**

- PIT – James Conner – 13 rushes, 89 yards
- JAX – James Robinson – 17 rushes, 73 yards

**Top receivers**

- PIT – Diontae Johnson – 12 receptions, 111 yards
- JAX – D. J. Chark – 4 receptions, 41 yards

==== Week 12: vs. Cleveland Browns ====
Week Twelve: Cleveland Browns at Jacksonville Jaguars – Game summary

Quarter	1	2	3	4	Total
**Browns**	7	10	3	7	**27**
Jaguars	3	10	6	6	**25**

at TIAA Bank Field, Jacksonville, Florida

- Date: November 29
- Game time: 1:00 p.m. EST
- Game weather: Partly cloudy, 70 °F (21 °C)
- Game attendance: 15,926
- Referee: Jerome Boger
- TV announcers (CBS): Spero Dedes and Adam Archuleta
- Recap, Game Book

Game information

**First quarter**

- JAX – Aldrick Rosas 54-yard field goal, 6:35. Jaguars 3–0. **Drive: 6 plays, 14 yards, 3:11.**
- CLE – Jarvis Landry 5-yard pass from Baker Mayfield (Cody Parkey kick), 3:40. Browns 7–3. **Drive: 5 plays, 55 yards, 2:55.**

**Second quarter**

- JAX – Aldrick Rosas 24-yard field goal, 13:37. Browns 7–6. **Drive: 11 plays, 69 yards, 5:03.**
- CLE – Cody Parkey 24-yard field goal, 7:03. Browns 10–6. **Drive: 14 plays, 69 yards, 6:34.**
- JAX – Collin Johnson 46-yard pass from Mike Glennon (Aldrick Rosas kick), 4:14. Jaguars 13–10. **Drive: 5 plays, 77 yards, 2:49.**
- CLE – Austin Hooper 9-yard pass from Baker Mayfield (Cody Parkey kick), 1:10. Browns 17–13. **Drive: 8 plays, 84 yards, 3:04.**

**Third quarter**

- JAX – Tyler Eifert 2-yard pass from Mike Glennon (pass failed), 11:41. Jaguars 19–17. **Drive: 6 plays, 30 yards, 3:07.**
- CLE – Cody Parkey 45-yard field goal, 6:45. Browns 20–19. **Drive: 10 plays, 38 yards, 4:56.**

**Fourth quarter**

- CLE – Nick Chubb 1-yard run (Cody Parkey kick), 14:13. Browns 27–19. **Drive: 8 plays, 90 yards, 3:57.**
- JAX – James Robinson 4-yard run (pass failed), 2:14. Browns 27–25. **Drive: 11 plays, 78 yards, 3:15.**

**Top passers**

- CLE – Baker Mayfield – 19/29, 258 yards, 2 TD
- JAX – Mike Glennon – 20/35, 235 yards, 2 TD

**Top rushers**

- CLE – Nick Chubb – 19 rushes, 144 yards, TD
- JAX – James Robinson – 22 rushes, 128 yards, TD

**Top receivers**

- CLE – Jarvis Landry – 8 receptions, 143 yards, TD
- JAX – Collin Johnson – 4 receptions, 96 yards, TD

==== Week 13: at Minnesota Vikings ====
Week Thirteen: Jacksonville Jaguars at Minnesota Vikings – Game summary

Quarter	1	2	3	4	OT	Total
Jaguars	9	0	7	8	0	**24**
**Vikings**	0	6	13	5	3	**27**

at U.S. Bank Stadium, Minneapolis, Minnesota

- Date: December 6
- Game time: 1:00 p.m. EST/12:00 p.m. CST
- Game weather: None (indoor stadium)
- Game attendance: 0
- Referee: Land Clark
- TV announcers (CBS): Beth Mowins and Jay Feely
- Recap, Game Book

Game information

**First quarter**

- JAX – Laviska Shenault 28-yard pass from Mike Glennon (kick failed), 12:33. Jaguars 6–0. **Drive: 5 plays, 75 yards, 2:27.**
- JAX – Chase McLaughlin 22-yard field goal, 6:04. Jaguars 9–0. **Drive: 10 plays, 66 yards, 5:07.**

**Second quarter**

- MIN – Adam Thielen 3-yard pass from Kirk Cousins (kick failed), 2:50. Jaguars 9–6. **Drive: 10 plays, 78 yards, 4:50.**

**Third quarter**

- JAX – Joe Schobert 43-yard interception return (Chase McLaughlin kick), 14:50. Jaguars 16–6.
- MIN – C. J. Ham 12-yard pass from Kirk Cousins (Dan Bailey kick), 11:08. Jaguars 16–13. **Drive: 8 plays, 75 yards, 3:42.**
- MIN – Justin Jefferson 20-yard pass from Kirk Cousins (kick failed), 3:27. Vikings 19–16. **Drive: 8 plays, 90 yards, 3:50.**

**Fourth quarter**

- MIN – Mike Glennon sacked in the end zone for safety, 14:05. Vikings 21–16.
- MIN – Dan Bailey 48-yard field goal, 3:50. Vikings 24–16. **Drive: 5 plays, 14 yards, 1:39.**
- JAX – James Robinson 1-yard run (pass succeeded), 1:08. Tied 24–24. **Drive: 10 plays, 75 yards, 2:42.**

**Overtime**

- MIN – Dan Bailey 23-yard field goal, 1:49. Vikings 27–24. **Drive: 11 plays, 41 yards, 5:24.**

**Top passers**

- JAX – Mike Glennon – 28/42, 280 yards, TD, 2 INT
- MIN – Kirk Cousins – 28/43, 305 yards, 3 TD, INT

**Top rushers**

- JAX – James Robinson – 18 rushes, 78 yards, TD
- MIN – Dalvin Cook – 32 rushes, 120 yards

**Top receivers**

- JAX – Collin Johnson – 4 receptions, 66 yards
- MIN – Justin Jefferson – 9 receptions, 121 yards, TD

==== Week 14: vs. Tennessee Titans ====
Week Fourteen: Tennessee Titans at Jacksonville Jaguars – Game summary

Quarter	1	2	3	4	Total
**Titans**	7	10	14	0	**31**
Jaguars	0	3	7	0	**10**

at TIAA Bank Field, Jacksonville, Florida

- Date: December 13
- Game time: 1:00 p.m. EST
- Game weather: Partly cloudy, 69 °F (21 °C)
- Game attendance: 15,896
- Referee: Adrian Hill
- TV announcers (CBS): Spero Dedes and Adam Archuleta
- Recap, Game Book

Game information

**First quarter**

- TEN – A. J. Brown 37-yard pass from Ryan Tannehill (Stephen Gostkowski kick), 7:56. Titans 7–0. **Drive: 3 plays, 57 yards, 1:12.**

**Second quarter**

- JAX – Aldrick Rosas 53-yard field goal, 3:27. Titans 7–3. **Drive: 4 plays, 5 yards, 0:55.**
- TEN – Derrick Henry 36-yard run (Stephen Gostkowski kick), 0:44. Titans 14–3. **Drive: 5 plays, 75 yards, 2:43.**
- TEN – Stephen Gostkowski 53-yard field goal, 0:00. Titans 17–3. **Drive: 3 plays, 28 yards, 0:09.**

**Third quarter**

- TEN – Geoff Swaim 5-yard pass from Ryan Tannehill (Stephen Gostkowski kick), 12:24. Titans 24–3. **Drive: 5 plays, 75 yards, 2:36.**
- TEN – Derrick Henry 1-yard run (Stephen Gostkowski kick), 8:48. Titans 31–3. **Drive: 6 plays, 48 yards, 2:43.**
- JAX – Keelan Cole 5-yard pass from Gardner Minshew (Aldrick Rosas kick), 2:59. Titans 31–10. **Drive: 11 plays, 60 yards, 5:49.**

**Fourth quarter**

- No scoring plays.

**Top passers**

- TEN – Ryan Tannehill – 19/24, 212 yards, 2 TD
- JAX – Gardner Minshew – 18/31, 178 yards, TD

**Top rushers**

- TEN – Derrick Henry – 26 rushes, 215 yards, 2 TD
- JAX – James Robinson – 12 rushes, 67 yards

**Top receivers**

- TEN – A. J. Brown – 7 receptions, 112 yards, TD
- JAX – Keelan Cole – 7 receptions, 67 yards, TD

==== Week 15: at Baltimore Ravens ====
Week Fifteen: Jacksonville Jaguars at Baltimore Ravens – Game summary

Quarter	1	2	3	4	Total
Jaguars	0	0	7	7	**14**
**Ravens**	9	17	7	7	**40**

at M&T Bank Stadium, Baltimore, Maryland

- Date: December 20
- Game time: 1:00 p.m. EST
- Game weather: Mostly cloudy, 39 °F (4 °C)
- Game attendance: 0
- Referee: Ronald Torbert
- TV announcers (CBS): Andrew Catalon, James Lofton and Sheree Burruss
- Recap, Game Book

Game information

**First quarter**

- BAL – Gardner Minshew sacked in the end zone by Matthew Judon for a safety, 10:57. Ravens 2–0.
- BAL – Miles Boykin 4-yard pass from Lamar Jackson (Justin Tucker kick), 6:35. Ravens 9–0. **Drive: 7 play, 68 yards, 4:22.**

**Second quarter**

- BAL – J. K. Dobbins 2-yard run (Justin Tucker kick), 14:14. Ravens 16–0. **Drive: 6 plays, 49 yards, 2:36.**
- BAL – Justin Tucker 46-yard field goal, 7:44. Ravens 19–0. **Drive: 6 plays, 41 yards, 2:59.**
- BAL – Dez Bryant 11-yard pass from Lamar Jackson (Justin Tucker kick), 1:20. Ravens 26–0. **Drive: 8 play, 57 yards, 1:56.**

**Third quarter**

- JAX – James Robinson 17-yard pass from Gardner Minshew (Aldrick Rosas kick), 9:09. Ravens 26–7. **Drive: 10 play, 75 yards, 5:51.**
- BAL – Lamar Jackson 5-yard run (Justin Tucker kick), 4:35. Ravens 33–7. **Drive: 10 plays, 75 yards, 4:34.**

**Fourth quarter**

- BAL – Mark Andrews 3-yard pass from Lamar Jackson (Justin Tucker kick), 9:46. Ravens 40–7. **Drive: 10 play, 86 yards, 5:50.**
- JAX – Chris Conley 13-yard pass from Gardner Minshew (Aldrick Rosas kick), 1:44. Ravens 40–14. **Drive: 6 play, 66 yards, 2:11.**

**Top passers**

- JAX – Gardner Minshew – 22/29, 226 yards, 2 TD
- BAL – Lamar Jackson – 17/22, 243 yards, 3 TD, INT

**Top rushers**

- JAX – James Robinson – 16 rushes, 35 yards
- BAL – J. K. Dobbins – 13 rushes, 64 yards, TD

**Top receivers**

- JAX – D. J. Chark – 4 receptions, 53 yards
- BAL – Marquise Brown – 6 receptions, 98 yards

==== Week 16: vs. Chicago Bears ====
Week Sixteen: Chicago Bears at Jacksonville Jaguars – Game summary

Quarter	1	2	3	4	Total
**Bears**	7	6	21	7	**41**
Jaguars	3	7	0	7	**17**

at TIAA Bank Field, Jacksonville, Florida

- Date: December 27
- Game time: 1:00 p.m. EST
- Game weather: Clear, 55 °F (13 °C)
- Game attendance: 17,445
- Referee: Jerome Boger
- TV announcers (CBS): Greg Gumbel, Rich Gannon and Jay Feely
- Recap, Game Book

Game information

**First quarter**

- JAX – Aldrick Rosas 26-yard field goal, 8:14. Jaguars 3–0. **Drive: 12 plays, 71 yards, 6:46.**
- CHI – Jimmy Graham 5-yard pass from Mitchell Trubisky (Cairo Santos kick), 3:18. Bears 7–3. **Drive: 10 plays, 75 yards, 4:56.**

**Second quarter**

- CHI – Cairo Santos 20-yard field goal, 13:17. Bears 10–3. **Drive: 8 plays, 63 yards, 3:12.**
- JAX – D. J. Chark 20-yard pass from Mike Glennon (Aldrick Rosas kick), 8:21. Tied 10–10. **Drive: 10 plays, 70 yards, 4:56.**
- CHI – Cairo Santos 40-yard field goal, 0:00. Bears 13–10. **Drive: 2 plays, 10 yards, 0:08.**

**Third quarter**

- CHI – Mitchell Trubisky 6-yard run (Cairo Santos kick), 9;14. Bears 20–10. **Drive: 11 plays, 77 yards, 5:46.**
- CHI – David Montgomery 6-yard run (Cairo Santos kick), 3:17. Bears 27–10. **Drive: 8 plays, 54 yards, 4:01.**
- CHI – Jimmy Graham 22-yard pass from Mitchell Trubisky (Cairo Santos kick), 2:30. Bears 34–10. **Drive: 2 plays, 25 yards, 0:33.**

**Fourth quarter**

- CHI – Artavis Pierce 3-yard run (Cairo Santos kick), 11:47. Bears 41–10. **Drive: 9 plays, 48 yards, 4:08.**
- JAX – Laviska Shenault 34-yard pass from Mike Glennon (Aldrick Rosas kick), 4:29. Bears 41–17. **Drive: 6 plays, 64 yards, 2:12.**

**Top passers**

- CHI – Mitchell Trubisky – 24/35, 265 yards, 2 TD, INT
- JAX – Mike Glennon – 24/37, 211 yards, 2 TD, 2 INT

**Top rushers**

- CHI – David Montgomery – 23 rushes, 95 yards, TD
- JAX – Dare Ogunbowale – 14 rushes, 71 yards

**Top receivers**

- CHI – Allen Robinson – 10 receptions, 103 yards
- JAX – Laviska Shenault – 5 receptions, 48 yards, TD

==== Week 17: at Indianapolis Colts ====
Week Seventeen: Jacksonville Jaguars at Indianapolis Colts – Game summary

Quarter	1	2	3	4	Total
Jaguars	0	7	7	0	**14**
**Colts**	10	10	0	8	**28**

at Lucas Oil Stadium, Indianapolis, Indiana

- Date: January 3, 2021
- Game time: 4:25 p.m. EST
- Game weather: None (retractable roof closed)
- Game attendance: 9,976
- Referee: Shawn Smith
- TV announcers (CBS): Andrew Catalon, James Lofton and Sherree Burruss
- Recap, Game Book

Game information

**First quarter**

- IND – T. Y. Hilton 6-yard pass from Philip Rivers (Rodrigo Blankenship kick), 10:16. Colts 7–0. **Drive: 6 plays, 78 yards, 2:43.**
- IND – Rodrigo Blankenship 22-yard field goal, 1:16. Colts 10–0. **Drive: 13 plays, 80 yards, 7:26.**

**Second quarter**

- IND – Jonathan Taylor 1-yard run (Rodrigo Blankenship kick), 11:40. Colts 17–0. **Drive: 3 plays, 15 yards, 1:17.**
- IND – Rodrigo Blankenship 24-yard field goal, 2:38. Colts 20–0. **Drive: 7 plays, 43 yards, 3:43.**
- JAX – Laviska Shenault 9-yard pass from Mike Glennon (Aldrick Rosas kick), 0:27. Colts 20–7. **Drive: 7 plays, 75 yards, 2:11.**

**Third quarter**

- JAX – Laviska Shenault 8-yard pass from Mike Glennon (Aldrick Rosas kick), 6:26. Colts 20–14. **Drive: 10 plays, 61 yards, 5:41.**

**Fourth quarter**

- IND – Jonathan Taylor 45-yard run (pass succeeded), 3:35. Colts 28–14. **Drive: 2 plays, 50 yards, 0:51.**

**Top passers**

- IND – Philip Rivers – 17/27, 164 yards, TD, INT
- JAX – Mike Glennon – 26/42, 261 yards, 2 TD

**Top rushers**

- IND – Jonathan Taylor – 30 rushes, 253 yards, 2 TD
- JAX – Dare Ogunbowale – 14 rushes, 50 yards

**Top receivers**

- IND – Nyheim Hines – 6 receptions, 50 yards
- JAX – Chris Conley – 7 receptions, 87 yards

=== Standings ===
==== Division ====
AFC South
	W	L	T	PCT	DIV	CONF	PF	PA	STK
^{(4)} Tennessee Titans	11	5	0	.688	5–1	8–4	491	439	W1
^{(7)} Indianapolis Colts	11	5	0	.688	4–2	7–5	451	362	W1
Houston Texans	4	12	0	.250	2–4	3–9	384	464	L5
Jacksonville Jaguars	1	15	0	.063	1–5	1–11	306	492	L15

==== Conference ====
AFC
#	Team	Division	W	L	T	PCT	DIV	CONF	SOS	SOV	STK
**Division leaders**
1	Kansas City Chiefs	West	14	2	0	.875	4–2	10–2	.465	.464	L1
2	Buffalo Bills	East	13	3	0	.813	6–0	10–2	.512	.471	W6
3	Pittsburgh Steelers	North	12	4	0	.750	4–2	9–3	.475	.448	L1
4 (Note: Tennessee finished ahead of Indianapolis in the AFC South based on division record.)	Tennessee Titans	South	11	5	0	.688	5–1	8–4	.475	.398	W1
**Wild cards**
5 (Note: Baltimore claimed the No. 5 seed over Indianapolis based on head-to-head victory. Division tiebreaker used to eliminate Cleveland (see below).) (Note: Baltimore claimed the No. 5 seed over Cleveland based on head-to-head sweep.)	Baltimore Ravens	North	11	5	0	.688	4–2	7–5	.494	.401	W5
6 (Note: Cleveland claimed the No. 6 seed over Indianapolis based on head-to-head victory.)	Cleveland Browns	North	11	5	0	.688	3–3	7–5	.451	.406	W1
7	Indianapolis Colts	South	11	5	0	.688	4–2	7–5	.443	.384	W1
**Did not qualify for the postseason**
8	Miami Dolphins	East	10	6	0	.625	3–3	7–5	.467	.347	L1
9	Las Vegas Raiders	West	8	8	0	.500	4–2	6–6	.539	.477	W1
10 (Note: New England finished ahead of the LA Chargers based on head-to-head victory.)	New England Patriots	East	7	9	0	.438	3–3	6–6	.527	.429	W1
11	Los Angeles Chargers	West	7	9	0	.438	3–3	6–6	.482	.344	W4
12	Denver Broncos	West	5	11	0	.313	1–5	4–8	.566	.388	L3
13	Cincinnati Bengals	North	4	11	1	.281	1–5	4–8	.529	.438	L1
14	Houston Texans	South	4	12	0	.250	2–4	3–9	.541	.219	L5
15	New York Jets	East	2	14	0	.125	0–6	1–11	.594	.656	L1
16	Jacksonville Jaguars	South	1	15	0	.063	1–5	1–11	.549	.688	L15
**Tiebreakers** (Note: When breaking ties for three or more teams under the NFL's rules, they are first broken within divisions, then comparing only the highest ranked remaining team from each division.)
