= Keelan Cole =

American football player (born 1993)

Profile
- Position: Wide receiver

Personal information
- Born: April 20, 1993 (age 33); Louisville, Kentucky, U.S.
- Listed height: 6 ft 1 in (1.85 m)
- Listed weight: 194 lb (88 kg)

Career information
- High school: Central (Louisville, Kentucky)
- College: Kentucky Wesleyan (2012–2016)
- NFL draft: 2017: undrafted

Career history
- Jacksonville Jaguars (2017–2020); New York Jets (2021); Las Vegas Raiders (2022–2023); Helvetic Mercenaries (2025)*
- * Offseason or practice squad member only

Career NFL statistics
- Receptions: 197
- Receiving yards: 2,832
- Receiving touchdowns: 14
- Return yards: 575
- Return touchdowns: 1
- Stats at Pro Football Reference

Keelan Lawrence Cole Sr. (born April 20, 1993) is an American professional football player. He was signed by the Jacksonville Jaguars of the National Football League (NFL) as an undrafted free agent after the 2017 NFL draft. He played college football at Kentucky Wesleyan.

== Early life ==
Cole attended and played high school football at Central High School in Louisville, Kentucky.

== College career ==
Cole attended and played college football at Kentucky Wesleyan from 2012 to 2016. From 2014 to 2016, he contributed 4,441 receiving yards and 55 receiving touchdowns.

== Professional career ==
Pre-draft measurables
Height	Weight	Arm length	Hand span	40-yard dash	10-yard split	20-yard split	20-yard shuttle	Three-cone drill
6 ft 0 7/8 in (1.85 m)	194 lb (88 kg)	32 1/8 in (0.82 m)	9 1/8 in (0.23 m)	4.59 s	1.59 s	2.63 s	4.40 s	6.69 s
All values from Pro Day

=== Jacksonville Jaguars ===
==== 2017 season ====
On May 1, 2017, Cole was signed by the Jacksonville Jaguars as an undrafted free agent.

On August 10, 2017, Cole played his first preseason game, catching a 97-yard touchdown pass against the New England Patriots.

On September 10, 2017, in the season opener, Cole made his regular season debut in a 29–7 victory over the Houston Texans. On September 17, 2017, in Week 2, he had the first two receptions of his career, which totaled 13 yards, in a 37–16 loss to the Tennessee Titans. On December 10, 2017, during Week 14 against the Seattle Seahawks, Cole finished with 99 receiving yards, including a 75-yard touchdown, as the Jaguars won 30–24. During a Week 15 win of 45–7 over the Texans, Cole finished with an NFL-leading 186 receiving yards and a touchdown, including a 73-yard reception to the one-yard line. He appeared in all 16 games and started six. Overall, he finished his rookie season with 42 receptions for 748 receiving yards and three receiving touchdowns.

==== 2018 season ====
In Week 2 of the 2018 season, Cole recorded seven receptions for 116 yards and a touchdown in the 31–20 victory over the New England Patriots. Overall, Cole finished the 2018 season with 38 receptions for 491 receiving yards and one receiving touchdown in 16 games, of which he started 11.

==== 2019 season ====
In the 2019 season, Cole finished with 24 receptions for 361 receiving yards and three receiving touchdowns in 16 games and one start.

==== 2020 season ====
On March 17, 2020, the Jaguars placed a second-round restricted free agent tender on Cole. He signed the one-year contract on April 23, 2020. In Week 6 against the Detroit Lions, he had six receptions for 143 receiving yards in the 34–16 loss. In Week 10 against the Green Bay Packers, Cole recorded five catches for 47 yards and a receiving touchdown and returned a punt for a 91-yard touchdown during the 24–20 loss. In the 2020 season, Cole had 55 receptions for 642 receiving yards and five receiving touchdowns in 16 games and five starts.

=== New York Jets ===
On March 19, 2021, Cole signed a one-year, $5.5 million contract with New York Jets. In the 2021 season, Cole had 28 receptions for 449 receiving yards and one receiving touchdown in 15 games and 11 starts.

=== Las Vegas Raiders ===
On May 12, 2022, Cole signed as free agent with Las Vegas Raiders. He was released on August 30. On September 6, Cole was re-signed to the team's practice squad. On September 13, Cole was signed to the active roster. He appeared in 14 games and started three in the 2022 season. Cole recorded ten receptions for 141 receiving yards and one receiving touchdown. He handled some punt return duties as well.

On March 23, 2023, Cole re-signed with the Raiders. He was released on August 29. Cole was re-signed to the practice squad on September 5. His contract expired when the teams season ended January 7, 2024.

=== Helvetic Mercenaries ===
On February 14, 2025, Cole signed with the Helvetic Mercenaries of the European League of Football. On July 7, Cole and the Mercenaries parted ways due to "ongoing difficulty in obtaining a work visa."

== NFL career statistics ==
Year	Team	Games		Receiving					Fumbles	
Year	Team	GP	GS	Rec	Yds	Avg	Lng	TD	Fum	Lost
2017	JAX	16	6	42	748	17.8	75T	3	2	1
2018	JAX	16	11	38	491	12.9	35	1	2	2
2019	JAX	16	1	24	361	15.0	55	3	0	0
2020	JAX	16	5	55	642	11.7	51	5	0	0
2021	NYJ	15	11	28	449	16.0	54	1	0	0
2022	LVR	14	3	10	141	14.1	30	1	1	0
Career		93	37	197	2,832	14.4	75T	14	5	3
