= 2019 Cleveland Browns season =

71st season in franchise history

- Owner: Jimmy Haslam; Dee Haslam
- General manager: John Dorsey
- Head coach: Freddie Kitchens
- Home stadium: FirstEnergy Stadium

Results
- Record: 6–10
- Division place: 3rd AFC North
- Playoffs: Did not qualify
- All-Pros: G Joel Bitonio (2nd team)
- Pro Bowlers: G Joel Bitonio; RB Nick Chubb; WR Jarvis Landry

Uniform
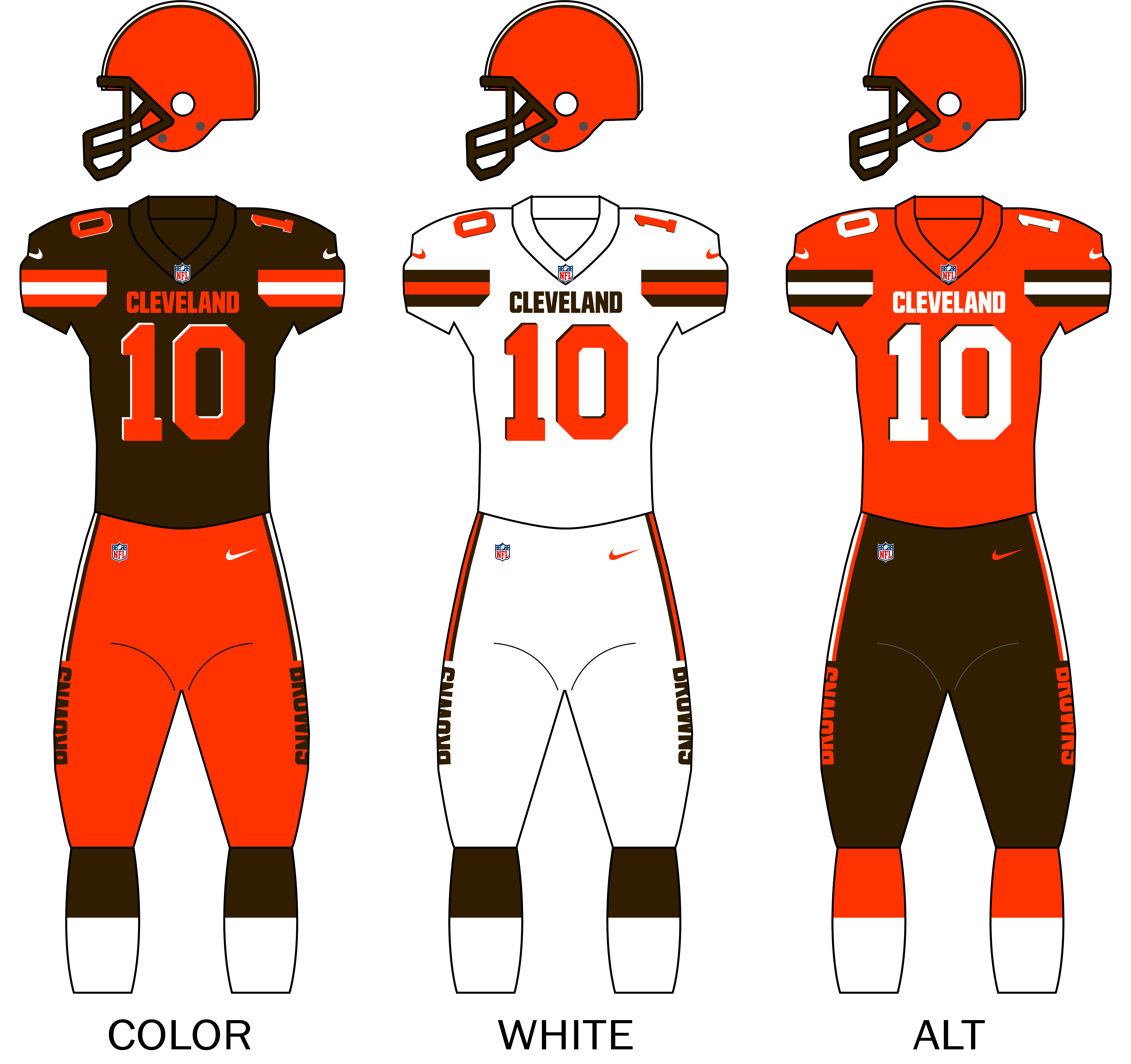

The 2019 season was the Cleveland Browns' 67th in the National Football League (NFL), their 71st overall, their second full season under general manager John Dorsey and their only season under head coach Freddie Kitchens. They finished 6–10 despite entering the season with high expectations, failing to improve on their 7–8–1 record from 2018 or end their franchise-record and league-high 16-year playoff drought. They also suffered a 12th consecutive losing season, also a franchise record and the longest such streak in the league. Following the season, the Browns fired Kitchens after one season and Dorsey left his position as well.

== Offseason ==
=== Coaching changes ===
On October 29, 2018, after Week 8 of the 2018 season, the Browns fired head coach Hue Jackson. Jackson posted a record of 3–36–1 (.088) record during his 2 1/2-season tenure with the Browns. Jackson failed to win any away games during his tenure and lost every game in 2017. Offensive coordinator Todd Haley was also fired the same day. Defensive coordinator Gregg Williams finished out the 2018 season with a 5–3 (.625) record as interim head coach.

On January 12, 2019, the Browns promoted interim offensive coordinator Freddie Kitchens to head coach.

On January 12, the Browns hired former Minnesota Vikings special teams coordinator Mike Priefer to the same role.

On January 14, the Browns hired former Tampa Bay Buccaneers offensive coordinator Todd Monken as offensive coordinator and former Arizona Cardinals head coach Steve Wilks as defensive coordinator.

=== Roster changes ===
==== Re-signings ====
Position	Player	Tag	Date
LB	Ray-Ray Armstrong	UFA	March 13
CB	Juston Burris	UFA	April 1
DT	Trevon Coley	ERFA	April 1
CB	Phillip Gaines	UFA	March 19
WR	Rashard Higgins	RFA	April 1
OT	Greg Robinson	UFA	February 25
FS	Jermaine Whitehead	ERFA	April 1

==== Players added ====
Position	Player	Tag	2018 team	Date
WR	Odell Beckham Jr.	Trade (Note: The Browns acquired WR Odell Beckham Jr. and LB Olivier Vernon from the New York Giants in exchange for SS Jabrill Peppers, G Kevin Zeitler, and 2019 1st-round (No. 17) and 3rd-round (No. 95) selections.)	New York Giants	March 13
QB	Garrett Gilbert	UFA	Carolina Panthers	April 5
TE	Demetrius Harris	UFA	Kansas City Chiefs	March 14
RB	Kareem Hunt	UFA	Kansas City Chiefs	February 11
RB	D'Ernest Johnson	UFA	Orlando Apollos (AAF)	May 16
G	Eric Kush	UFA	Chicago Bears	March 14
OT	Kendall Lamm	UFA	Houston Texans	March 15
G	Justin McCray	Trade (Note: The Browns acquired G Justin McCray and an undisclosed 2020 draft selection from the Green Bay Packers in exchange for an undisclosed 2020 draft selection.)	Green Bay Packers	April 1
SS	Eric Murray	Trade (Note: The Browns acquired S Eric Murray from the Kansas City Chiefs in exchange for DE Emmanuel Ogbah)	Kansas City Chiefs	April 1
DT	Sheldon Richardson	UFA	Minnesota Vikings	March 13
LB	Adarius Taylor	UFA	Tampa Bay Buccaneers	March 14
WR	Taywan Taylor	Trade (Note: The Browns acquired WR Taywan Taylor from the Tennessee Titans in exchange for an undisclosed 2020 draft selection.)	Tennessee Titans	August 31
G	Wyatt Teller	Trade (Note: The Browns acquired G Wyatt Teller and a 2021 7th round selection from the Buffalo Bills in exchange for 2020 5th and 6th round selections.)	Buffalo Bills	August 30
DE	Olivier Vernon	Trade	New York Giants	March 13

==== Players lost ====
Position	Player	Tag	2019 team	Date
LB	Ray-Ray Armstrong	Release	New Orleans Saints	September 18
CB	Briean Boddy-Calhoun	UFA	Houston Texans	March 15
LB	Jamie Collins	Release	New England Patriots	May 15
P	Britton Colquitt	Release	Minnesota Vikings	August 31
DT	Carl Davis	Release	Indianapolis Colts	October 14
TE	Seth DeValve	Release	Jacksonville Jaguars	August 31
TE	Darren Fells	Release	Houston Texans	March 19
C	Kyle Friend	Release		
CB	E. J. Gaines	UFA	Buffalo Bills	March 25
OT	Desmond Harrison	Release	Arizona Cardinals	June 6
RB	Duke Johnson	Trade (Note: The Browns acquired a 2020 3rd round selection from the Houston Texans in exchange for RB Duke Johnson. This was originally a conditional 4th round selection, but Johnson was active for at least 10 games for the Texans in 2019, which resulted in the pick becoming a 3rd round selection.)	Houston Texans	August 8
K	Greg Joseph	Release	Tennessee Titans	December 18
FS	Derrick Kindred	Release	Indianapolis Colts	April 2
WR	Ricardo Louis	Release	Miami Dolphins	April 8
RB	Devante Mays	Release	Jacksonville Jaguars	July 31
DE	Emmanuel Ogbah	Trade	Kansas City Chiefs	April 1
SS	Jabrill Peppers	Trade	New York Giants	March 13
WR	Breshad Perriman	UFA	Tampa Bay Buccaneers	March 13
QB	Tyrod Taylor	UFA	Los Angeles Chargers	March 13
LB	Tanner Vallejo	Release	Arizona Cardinals	February 5
G	Earl Watford	UFA	Tampa Bay Buccaneers	March 15
WR	Daniel Williams	Release		
CB	Howard Wilson	Release		
G	Kevin Zeitler	Trade	New York Giants	March 13
DE	Anthony Zettel	Release	Cincinnati Bengals	October 17

Trade notes

==== Players added and lost ====
During the 2019 off-season, the Browns also signed DT Brandin Bryant, WR Jaelen Strong, and G Bryan Witzmann, but released them prior to the start of the season

==== 2019 NFL draft ====
Cleveland traded their first-round pick (17th), a third-round pick previously acquired from New England (95th), guard Kevin Zeitler and safety Jabrill Peppers to New York in exchange for wide receiver Odell Beckham Jr. and defensive end Olivier Vernon.

2019 Cleveland Browns draft
Round	Selection	Player	Position	College
2	46	Greedy Williams	CB	LSU
3	80	Sione Takitaki	LB	BYU
4	119	Sheldrick Redwine	S	Miami (FL)
5	155	Mack Wilson	LB	Alabama
5	170	Austin Seibert	K	Oklahoma
6	189	Drew Forbes	OT	Southeast Missouri State
7	221	Donnie Lewis	CB	Tulane

==== Undrafted free agents ====
2019 Cleveland Browns UDFA
Player	Position	College	Signed	Cut
Ka'John Armstrong	OT	Eastern Michigan	June 6	August 10
Dorian Baker	WR	Kentucky	May 3	August 31
David Blough	QB	Purdue	May 3	August 30 (trade)
Stephen Carlson	TE	Princeton	May 3	August 31
Lo Falemaka	C	Utah	July 22	August 31 (placed on IR)
Brian Fineanganofo	OT	Idaho State	May 3	August 31
Jamie Gillan	P	Arkansas–Pine Bluff	May 3	
Darrin Hall	RB	Pittsburgh	May 3	May 6
J. T. Hassell	S	Florida Tech	May 3	August 31
D. J. Montgomery	WR	Austin Peay	May 3	August 31 (placed on IR)
Jarrell Owens	DE	Oklahoma State	May 3	August 31
Jermaine Ponder	CB	Saint Francis	May 3	August 3
Wyatt Ray	DE	Boston College	May 3	August 31
Anthony Stubbs	LB	Prairie View A&M	May 3	August 31
LJ Scott	RB	Michigan State	May 13	May 16
Trevon Tate	C	Memphis	May 3	May 28
Willie Wright	C	Tulsa	May 3	August 31
Dedrick Young II	LB	Nebraska	May 3	August 31
A green background indicates the player made the Browns' Week 1 53-man roster

=== Uniform changes ===
On September 4, the Browns announced that they would use their brown "color rush" uniforms, which they debuted in 2018, as their primary home uniforms for 2019, wearing them for six home games. These uniforms feature dark brown jerseys with orange numbers and orange stripes, and dark brown pants with the same orange stripes.

== Staff ==
2019 Cleveland Browns staff
Front office: EVP/COO – David Jenkins; Chief strategy officer – Paul DePodesta; General manager – John Dorsey; Assistant general manager – Eliot Wolf; Vice president, player personnel – Alonzo Highsmith; Vice president, player personnel – Ken Kovash; Vice president, football administration – Chris Cooper; Director, research & strategy – Kevin Meers; Director, scouting – Mike Cetta; Assistant director, scouting – Glenn Cook; Director, college scouting – Steve Malin; Director, pro scouting – Dan Saganey; Assistant director, pro scouting – Jim Noel; Special advisor – Jim Brown; Head coaches: Head coach – Freddie Kitchens; Associate head coach/offensive line – James Campen; Assistant to the head coach – Ryan Hollern; Special assistant to head coach – Jody Wright; Offensive coaches: Offensive coordinator – Todd Monken; Quarterbacks – Ryan Lindley; Run game coordinator/running backs – Stump Mitchell; Wide receivers – Adam Henry; Tight ends – John Lilly; Assistant offensive line – Jeff Blasko; Offensive quality control – Jim Dray; Offensive quality control – Tyler Tettleton	Defensive coaches: Defensive coordinator – Steve Wilks; Defensive line – Tosh Lupoi; Assistant defensive line – John Parrella; Defensive Run game coordinator/linebackers – Al Holcomb; Pass game coordinator/secondary – Joe Whitt Jr.; Defensive backs – DeWayne Walker; Senior defensive assistant – Chris Jones; Defensive quality control – Alonso Escalante; Defensive quality control – Deuce Schwartz; Defensive assistant – Kyohei Kosaka; Special teams coaches: Special teams coordinator – Mike Priefer; Assistant special teams – Doug Colman; Strength and conditioning: Director, strength and conditioning – Larry Jackson; Strength and conditioning assistant – Evan Marcus; Strength and conditioning assistant/sports science – Josh Christovich; Strength and conditioning assistant – Monty Gibson; Strength and conditioning assistant – Dale Jones

== Final roster ==
2019 Cleveland Browns roster
Quarterbacks (QB): 3 Garrett Gilbert; 6 Baker Mayfield; Running backs (RB): 24 Nick Chubb; 27 Kareem Hunt; 30 D'Ernest Johnson; Wide receivers (WR): 13 Odell Beckham Jr.; 81 Rashard Higgins; 12 KhaDarel Hodge; 80 Jarvis Landry; 18 Damion Ratley; 10 Taywan Taylor; Tight ends (TE): 86 Pharaoh Brown; 89 Stephen Carlson; 88 Demetrius Harris; 85 David Njoku; 83 Ricky Seals-Jones	Offensive linemen (OL): 75 Joel Bitonio G; 79 Drew Forbes G; 71 Colby Gossett G; 74 Chris Hubbard T; 72 Eric Kush G; 70 Kendall Lamm T; 67 Justin McCray T; 78 Greg Robinson T; 77 Wyatt Teller G; 64 JC Tretter C; Defensive linemen (DL): 91 Eli Ankou DT; 94 Bryan Cox Jr. DE; 97 Porter Gustin DE; 52 Robert McCray DE; 65 Larry Ogunjobi DT; 98 Sheldon Richardson DT; 92 Chad Thomas DE; 54 Olivier Vernon DE; 99 Justin Zimmer DT	Linebackers (LB): 55 Tae Davis OLB; 53 Joe Schobert MLB; 44 Sione Takitaki OLB; 57 Adarius Taylor MLB; 51 Mack Wilson OLB; Defensive backs (DB): 31 Juston Burris S; 38 T. J. Carrie CB; 49 J. T. Hassell SS; 39 Terrance Mitchell CB; 22 Eric Murray SS; 23 Damarious Randall FS; 29 Sheldrick Redwine SS; 20 Tavierre Thomas CB; 21 Denzel Ward CB; 26 Greedy Williams CB; Special teams (ST): 7 Jamie Gillan P; 47 Charley Hughlett LS; 4 Austin Seibert K	Practice squad: 90 Brandin Bryant DT; 17 Shelton Gibson WR; 48 Jermaine Grace OLB; 37 Donnie Lewis CB; 41 Montrel Meander OLB; 16 J'Mon Moore WR; 62 Malcolm Pridgeon G; 40 Tigie Sankoh FS ^{Int'l}; 84 Derrick Willies WR (IR); 66 Willie Wright C; 59 Trevon Young DE; Reserve: 42 Morgan Burnett SS (IR); 96 Daniel Ekuale DT (IR); -- Lo Falemaka C (IR); 95 Myles Garrett DE (Susp.); 56 Willie Harvey OLB (IR); 25 Dontrell Hilliard RB (IR); 34 Robert Jackson CB (IR); 58 Christian Kirksey OLB (IR); 15 D. J. Montgomery WR (IR); 5 Drew Stanton QB (IR); Rookies in italics 53 active, 11 reserve, 10 practice squad

== Preseason ==
Week	Date	Opponent	Result	Record	Venue	Recap
1	August 8	Washington Redskins	W 30–10	1–0	FirstEnergy Stadium	Recap
2	August 17	at Indianapolis Colts	W 21–18	2–0	Lucas Oil Stadium	Recap
3	August 23	at Tampa Bay Buccaneers	L 12–13	2–1	Raymond James Stadium	Recap
4	August 29	Detroit Lions	W 20–16	3–1	FirstEnergy Stadium	Recap

== Regular season ==
=== Schedule ===
Week	Date	Opponent	Result	Record	Venue	Recap
1	September 8	Tennessee Titans	**L** 13–43	0–1	FirstEnergy Stadium	Recap
2	September 16	at New York Jets	**W** 23–3	1–1	MetLife Stadium	Recap
3	September 22	Los Angeles Rams	**L** 13–20	1–2	FirstEnergy Stadium	Recap
4	September 29	at **Baltimore Ravens**	**W** 40–25	2–2	M&T Bank Stadium	Recap
5	October 7	at San Francisco 49ers	**L** 3–31	2–3	Levi's Stadium	Recap
6	October 13	Seattle Seahawks	**L** 28–32	2–4	FirstEnergy Stadium	Recap
7	Bye					
8	October 27	at New England Patriots	**L** 13–27	2–5	Gillette Stadium	Recap
9	November 3	at Denver Broncos	**L** 19–24	2–6	Empower Field at Mile High	Recap
10	November 10	Buffalo Bills	**W** 19–16	3–6	FirstEnergy Stadium	Recap
11	November 14	**Pittsburgh Steelers**	**W** 21–7	4–6	FirstEnergy Stadium	Recap
12	November 24	Miami Dolphins	**W** 41–24	5–6	FirstEnergy Stadium	Recap
13	December 1	at **Pittsburgh Steelers**	**L** 13–20	5–7	Heinz Field	Recap
14	December 8	**Cincinnati Bengals**	**W** 27–19	6–7	FirstEnergy Stadium	Recap
15	December 15	at Arizona Cardinals	**L** 24–38	6–8	State Farm Stadium	Recap
16	December 22	**Baltimore Ravens**	**L** 15–31	6–9	FirstEnergy Stadium	Recap
17	December 29	at **Cincinnati Bengals**	**L** 23–33	6–10	Paul Brown Stadium	Recap

Note: Intra-division opponents are in bold text.

=== Game summaries ===
==== Week 1: vs. Tennessee Titans ====
Week One: Tennessee Titans at Cleveland Browns – Game summary

Quarter	1	2	3	4	Total
**Titans**	3	9	10	21	**43**
Browns	6	0	7	0	**13**

at FirstEnergy Stadium, Cleveland, Ohio

- Date: September 8
- Game time: 1:00 p.m. EDT
- Game weather: Partly cloudy, 71 °F (22 °C)
- Game attendance: 67,431
- Referee: Brad Allen
- TV announcers (CBS): Jim Nantz, Tony Romo, Tracy Wolfson and Gene Steratore
- Recap, Game Book

Game information

**First quarter**

- CLE – Dontrell Hilliard 4-yard run (kick failed, wide right), 10:11. Browns 6–0. **Drive: 8 plays, 73 yards, 4:49.**
- TEN – Cairo Santos 37-yard field goal, 6:32. Browns 6–3. **Drive: 7 plays, 73 yards, 3:39.**

**Second quarter**

- TEN – Derrick Henry 1-yard run (Cairo Santos kick), 9:39. Titans 10–6. **Drive: 11 plays, 87 yards, 5:10.**
- TEN – Baker Mayfield sacked in the end zone by Cameron Wake for a safety, 1:42. Titans 12–6.

**Third quarter**

- TEN – Cairo Santos 53-yard field goal, 11:53. Titans 15–6. **Drive: 5 plays, 44 yards, 3:07.**
- CLE – David Njoku 3-yard pass from Baker Mayfield (Austin Seibert kick), 2:10. Titans 15–13. **Drive: 6 plays, 61 yards, 3:42.**
- TEN – Derrick Henry 75-yard pass from Marcus Mariota (Cairo Santos kick), 1:57. Titans 22–13. **Drive: 1 play, 75 yards, 0:13.**

**Fourth quarter**

- TEN – Delanie Walker 11-yard pass from Marcus Mariota (Cairo Santos kick), 12:32. Titans 29–13. **Drive: 4 plays, 35 yards, 1:39.**
- TEN – Delanie Walker 7-yard pass from Marcus Mariota (Cairo Santos kick), 9:03. Titans 36–13. **Drive: 4 plays, 34 yards, 2:14.**
- TEN – Malcolm Butler 38-yard interception return (Cairo Santos kick), 3:02. Titans 43–13.

**Top passers**

- TEN – Marcus Mariota – 14/24, 248 yards, 3 TD
- CLE – Baker Mayfield – 25/38, 285 yards, TD, 3 INT

**Top rushers**

- TEN – Derrick Henry – 19 rushes, 84 yards, TD
- CLE – Nick Chubb – 16 rushes, 75 yards

**Top receivers**

- TEN – A. J. Brown – 3 receptions, 100 yards
- CLE – Odell Beckham Jr. – 7 receptions, 71 yards

The Browns opened the season with a home game against the Tennessee Titans with high hopes after their 7–8–1 season in 2018. The Browns scored a touchdown on their first drive to take a 6–0 lead, but the Titans controlled the game after that, taking a 12–6 lead into halftime. After a Titans field goal, a Browns' touchdown late in the third quarter made the score 15–13, but that is the closest they would get as quarterback Baker Mayfield threw three interceptions and the Titans scored four unanswered touchdowns to secure a 43–13 win.

With the loss, the Browns opened the season at 0–1. The Browns failed to win in Week 1 for the 15th consecutive season. They also committed 18 penalties for 182 yards, their most penalties in a game since 1951.

==== Week 2: at New York Jets ====
Week Two: Cleveland Browns at New York Jets – Game summary

Quarter	1	2	3	4	Total
**Browns**	6	10	7	0	**23**
Jets	0	3	0	0	**3**

at MetLife Stadium, East Rutherford, New Jersey

- Date: September 16
- Game time: 8:15 pm. EDT
- Game weather: Cloudy, 72 °F (22 °C)
- Game attendance: 78,523
- Referee: Alex Kemp
- TV announcers (ESPN): Joe Tessitore, Booger McFarland, Lisa Salters and John Parry
- Recap, Game Book

Game information

**First quarter**

- CLE – Austin Seibert 23-yard field goal, 10:27. Browns 3–0. **Drive: 11 plays, 76 yards, 4:33.**
- CLE – Austin Seibert 48-yard field goal, 6:15. Browns 6–0. **Drive: 6 plays, 22 yards, 2:32.**

**Second quarter**

- CLE – Nick Chubb 19-yard run (Austin Seibert kick), 10:16. Browns 13–0. **Drive: 5 plays, 53 yards, 3:07.**
- NYJ – Sam Ficken 46-yard field goal, 2:56. Browns 13–3. **Drive: 11 plays, 47 yards, 7:20.**
- CLE – Austin Seibert 43-yard field goal, 0:00. Browns 16–3. **Drive: 5 plays, 15 yards, 0:35.**

**Third quarter**

- CLE – Odell Beckham Jr. 89-yard pass from Baker Mayfield (Austin Seibert kick), 3:32. Browns 23–3. **Drive: 1 play, 89 yards, 0:11.**

**Fourth quarter**

- No scoring plays.

**Top passers**

- CLE – Baker Mayfield – 19/35, 325 yards, TD, INT
- NYJ – Luke Falk – 20/25, 198 yards

**Top rushers**

- CLE – Nick Chubb – 18 rushes, 62 yards, TD
- NYJ – Le'Veon Bell – 21 rushes, 68 yards

**Top receivers**

- CLE – Odell Beckham Jr. – 6 receptions, 161 yards, TD
- NYJ – Robby Anderson – 4 receptions, 81 yards

The Browns traveled to New York for a Monday Night Football matchup against the Jets, marking the Browns' first MNF appearance since 2015. The Browns opened the scoring with a pair of Austin Seibert field goals—the first of his career—in the first quarter to take a 6–0 lead. After the Browns added a Nick Chubb touchdown run, the teams traded field goals late in the second quarter to give the Browns a 16–3 halftime lead. The only score of the second half was an 89-yard touchdown pass from Baker Mayfield to Odell Beckham Jr. to give the Browns a 23–3 win. The Browns' defense had a solid performance with four sacks (including three by Myles Garrett), one takeaway and two fourth-down stops.

With the win, the Browns improved to 1–1. Punter Jamie Gillan was named the AFC Special Teams Player of the Week; he made six punts, five of which landed inside the Jets' 20-yard line, averaging 38.5 yards per kick.

==== Week 3: vs. Los Angeles Rams ====
Week Three: Los Angeles Rams at Cleveland Browns – Game summary

Quarter	1	2	3	4	Total
**Rams**	3	0	7	10	**20**
Browns	0	6	7	0	**13**

at FirstEnergy Stadium, Cleveland, Ohio

- Date: September 22
- Game time: 8:20 pm. EDT
- Game weather: Mostly clear, 83 °F (28 °C)
- Game attendance: 67,895
- Referee: Shawn Smith
- TV announcers (NBC): Al Michaels, Cris Collinsworth, Michele Tafoya and Terry McAulay
- Recap, Game Book

Game information

**First quarter**

- LAR – Greg Zuerlein 53-yard field goal, 4:06. Rams 3–0. **Drive: 11 plays, 51 yards, 4:58.**

**Second quarter**

- CLE – Austin Seibert 23-yard field goal, 11:41. Tied 3–3. **Drive: 13 plays, 70 yards, 7:25.**
- CLE – Austin Seibert 35-yard field goal, 0:00. Browns 6–3. **Drive: 4 plays, 0 yards, 0:18.**

**Third quarter**

- LAR – Cooper Kupp 11-yard pass from Jared Goff (Greg Zuerlein kick), 10:40. Rams 10–6. **Drive: 10 plays, 75 yards, 4:20.**
- CLE – Demetrius Harris 2-yard pass from Baker Mayfield (Austin Seibert kick), 4:37. Browns 13–10. **Drive: 11 plays, 75 yards, 6:03.**

**Fourth quarter**

- LAR – Cooper Kupp 6-yard pass from Jared Goff (Greg Zuerlein kick), 12:48. Rams 17–13. **Drive: 8 plays, 72 yards, 4:12.**
- LAR – Greg Zuerlein 37-yard field goal, 6:37. Rams 20–13. **Drive: 9 plays, 43 yards, 2:37.**

**Top passers**

- LAR – Jared Goff – 24/38, 269 yards, 2 TD, 2 INT
- CLE – Baker Mayfield – 18/36, 195 yards, TD, INT

**Top rushers**

- LAR – Todd Gurley – 14 rushes, 43 yards
- CLE – Nick Chubb – 23 rushes, 96 yards

**Top receivers**

- LAR – Brandin Cooks – 8 receptions, 112 yards
- CLE – Jarvis Landry – 3 receptions, 62 yards

The Browns hosted the Los Angeles Rams in their first Sunday Night Football appearance since 2008. The Browns held a 6–3 halftime lead after a highly defensive first half. The only scoring came via field goals from the Browns' Austin Seibert and the Rams' Greg Zuerlein. In the third quarter, the Rams drove down the field and scored a touchdown on a Jared Goff pass to Cooper Kupp to take a 10–6 lead. The Browns responded on their next drive with a Baker Mayfield pass to Demetrius Harris to retake the lead at 13–10. Early in the fourth quarter, the Rams regained the lead, 17–13, on another Goff touchdown pass to Kupp and extended their lead to 20–13 with a Zuerlein field goal. Late in the game, the Browns had a chance to tie the score with a touchdown. In the final minute, the Browns had the ball first and goal from the Rams' 4-yard line, but Mayfield threw three incomplete passes, followed by an interception on fourth down.

With the loss, the Browns fell to 1–2.

==== Week 4: at Baltimore Ravens ====
Week Four: Cleveland Browns at Baltimore Ravens – Game summary

Quarter	1	2	3	4	Total
**Browns**	7	3	14	16	**40**
Ravens	0	7	3	15	**25**

at M&T Bank Stadium, Baltimore, Maryland

- Date: September 29
- Game time: 1:00 pm. EDT
- Game weather: Partly cloudy, 83 °F (28 °C)
- Game attendance: 70,686
- Referee: Shawn Hochuli
- TV announcers (CBS): Greg Gumbel, Trent Green and Melanie Collins
- Recap, Game Book

Game information

**First quarter**

- CLE – Ricky Seals-Jones 9-yard pass from Baker Mayfield (Austin Seibert kick), 2:50. Browns 7–0. **Drive: 13 plays, 84 yards, 8:31.**

**Second quarter**

- BAL – Miles Boykin 9-yard pass from Lamar Jackson (Justin Tucker kick), 1:55. Tied 7–7. **Drive: 7 plays, 58 yards, 3:40.**
- CLE – Austin Seibert 24-yard field goal, 0:08. Browns 10–7. **Drive: 10 plays, 81 yards, 1:47.**

**Third quarter**

- BAL – Justin Tucker 41-yard field goal, 11:15. Tied 10–10. **Drive: 8 plays, 62 yards, 3:45.**
- CLE – Nick Chubb 14-yard run (Austin Seibert kick), 9:41. Browns 17–10. **Drive: 3 plays, 75 yards, 1:34.**
- CLE – Nick Chubb 2-yard run (Austin Seibert kick), 0:53. Browns 24–10. **Drive: 8 plays, 74 yards, 5:18.**

**Fourth quarter**

- BAL – Mark Andrews 8-yard pass from Lamar Jackson (Mark Ingram II run), 9:51. Browns 24–18. **Drive: 14 plays, 75 yards, 6:02.**
- CLE – Nick Chubb 88-yard run (pass failed), 9:35. Browns 30–18. **Drive: 1 play, 83 yards, 0:16.**
- CLE – Austin Seibert 43-yard field goal, 6:56. Browns 33–18. **Drive: 4 plays, 6 yards, 1:19.**
- CLE – Dontrell Hilliard 1-yard run (Austin Seibert kick), 2:14. Browns 40–18. **Drive: 6 plays, 39 yards, 3:07.**
- BAL – Willie Snead IV 50-yard pass from Lamar Jackson (Justin Tucker kick), 0:30. Browns 40-25. **Drive: 5 plays, 79 yards, 1:44.**

**Top passers**

- CLE – Baker Mayfield – 20/30, 342 yards, TD, INT
- BAL – Lamar Jackson – 24/34, 247 yards, 3 TD, 2 INT

**Top rushers**

- CLE – Nick Chubb – 20 rushes, 165 yards, 3 TD
- BAL – Mark Ingram II – 12 rushes, 71 yards

**Top receivers**

- CLE – Jarvis Landry – 8 receptions, 167 yards
- BAL – Willie Snead IV – 2 receptions, 61 yards, TD

The Browns opened the scoring in the first quarter with a Baker Mayfield touchdown pass to Ricky Seals-Jones. However, the Ravens responded with a Lamar Jackson touchdown pass to Miles Boykin to tie the game at 7–7. An Austin Seibert field goal gave the Browns a 10–7 lead at halftime. In the second half, Nick Chubb led the Browns, scoring a career-high three touchdowns and rushing for 128 of his 165 yards on the day, including an 88-yard touchdown run to extend the Browns' lead just two plays after the Ravens had cut the score to 24–18. A Dontrell Hilliard touchdown run extended the Browns' lead to 40–18. The Ravens added a garbage-time touchdown to make the final score 40–25.

With the win, the Browns improved to 2–2 and moved into first place in the AFC North for the first time since Week 10 of 2014. For his 165 yards and three touchdowns, Chubb was named the AFC Offensive Player of the Week and FedEx Ground Player of the Week

On October 3, punter Jamie Gillan was named the AFC Special Teams Player of the Month for September. Gillan had 11 punts inside the 20-yard line and helped the Browns limit opponents to just 19 punt return yards for the month.

==== Week 5: at San Francisco 49ers ====
Week Five: Cleveland Browns at San Francisco 49ers – Game summary

Quarter	1	2	3	4	Total
Browns	0	3	0	0	**3**
**49ers**	14	7	7	3	**31**

at Levi's Stadium, Santa Clara, California

- Date: October 7
- Game time: 8:15 pm. EDT/5:15 p.m. PDT
- Game weather: Clear, 87 °F (31 °C)
- Game attendance: 70,585
- Referee: Jerome Boger
- TV announcers (ESPN): Joe Tessitore, Booger McFarland, Lisa Salters and John Parry
- Recap, Game Book

Game information

**First quarter**

- SF – Matt Breida 83-yard run (Robbie Gould kick), 13:17. 49ers 7–0. **Drive: 1 play, 83 yards, 0:11.**
- SF – Matt Breida 5-yard pass from Jimmy Garoppolo (Robbie Gould kick), 6:26. 49ers 14–0. **Drive: 8 plays, 74 yards, 3:57.**

**Second quarter**

- CLE – Austin Seibert 30-yard field goal, 11:22. 49ers 14–3. **Drive: 10 plays, 51 yards, 4:47.**
- SF – Tevin Coleman 19-yard run (Robbie Gould kick), 1:54. 49ers 21–3. **Drive: 6 plays, 49 yards, 2:51.**

**Third quarter**

- SF – George Kittle 22-yard pass from Jimmy Garoppolo (Robbie Gould kick), 10:37. 49ers 28–3. **Drive: 9 plays, 90 yards, 4:23.**

**Fourth quarter**

- SF – Robbie Gould 44-yard field goal, 5:08. 49ers 31–3. **Drive: 4 plays, 3 yards, 1:54.**

**Top passers**

- CLE – Baker Mayfield – 8/22, 100 yards, 2 INT
- SF – Jimmy Garoppolo – 20/29, 181 yards, 2 TD

**Top rushers**

- CLE – Nick Chubb – 16 rushes, 87 yards
- SF – Matt Breida – 11 rushes, 114 yards, TD

**Top receivers**

- CLE – Jarvis Landry – 4 receptions, 75 yards
- SF – George Kittle – 6 receptions, 70 yards, TD

The 49ers opened the scoring with a pair of Matt Breida touchdowns in the first quarter – an 83-yard run and a 5-yard reception from Jimmy Garoppolo. After a Browns field goal, the 49ers continued their dominance, scoring an additional 17 points en route to a 31–3 blowout win. The 49ers defense held Baker Mayfield to just 100 passing yards and no touchdowns, marking Mayfield's first career start in which he did not throw a touchdown pass, having done so in each of his first 17 starts. The Browns also turned the ball over four times, including two Mayfield interceptions.

With the loss, the Browns fell to 2–3.

==== Week 6: vs. Seattle Seahawks ====
Week Six: Seattle Seahawks at Cleveland Browns – Game summary

Quarter	1	2	3	4	Total
**Seahawks**	6	12	7	7	**32**
Browns	14	6	0	8	**28**

at FirstEnergy Stadium, Cleveland, Ohio

- Date: October 13
- Game time: 1:00 pm. EDT
- Game weather: Sunny, 58 °F (14 °C)
- Game attendance: 67,431
- Referee: Adrian Hill
- TV announcers (Fox): Chris Myers, Daryl Johnston and Laura Okmin
- Recap, Game Book

Game information

**First quarter**

- CLE – Nick Chubb 7-yard run (Austin Seibert kick), 13:01. Browns 7–0. **Drive: 3 plays, 23 yards, 1:59.**
- SEA – Russell Wilson 16-yard run (kick failed, wide right), 8:52. Browns 7–6. **Drive: 7 plays, 75 yards, 4:09.**
- CLE – Baker Mayfield 10-yard run (Austin Seibert kick), 4:43. Browns 14–6. **Drive: 10 plays, 69 yards, 4:09.**

**Second quarter**

- CLE – Ricky Seals-Jones 31-yard pass from Baker Mayfield (kick failed, wide left), 14:54. Browns 20–6. **Drive: 3 plays, 92 yards, 1:25.**
- SEA – Jason Myers 38-yard field goal, 10:46. Browns 20–9. **Drive: 9 plays, 55 yards, 4:08.**
- SEA – Jason Myers 20-yard field goal, 7:25. Browns 20–12. **Drive: 6 plays, 18 yards, 2:41.**
- SEA – Jaron Brown 17-yard pass from Russell Wilson (run failed), 0:22. Browns 20–18. **Drive: 8 plays, 88 yards, 1:07.**

**Third quarter**

- SEA – Jaron Brown 6-yard pass from Russell Wilson (Jason Myers kick), 6:00. Seahawks 25–20. **Drive: 7 plays, 58 yards, 2:54.**

**Fourth quarter**

- CLE – Nick Chubb 3-yard run (Baker Mayfield–Demetrius Harris pass), 9:02. Browns 28–25. **Drive: 2 plays, 24 yards, 0:46.**
- SEA – Chris Carson 1-yard run (Jason Myers kick), 3:30. Seahawks 32–28. **Drive: 9 plays, 79 yards, 5:32.**

**Top passers**

- SEA – Russell Wilson – 23/33, 295 yards, 2 TD
- CLE – Baker Mayfield – 22/37, 249 yards, TD, 3 INT

**Top rushers**

- SEA – Chris Carson – 24 rushes, 124 yards, TD
- CLE – Nick Chubb – 20 rushes, 122 yards, 2 TD

**Top receivers**

- SEA – Tyler Lockett – 5 receptions, 75 yards
- CLE – Odell Beckham Jr. – 6 receptions, 101 yards

The Browns returned home to take on the Seattle Seahawks in Week 6 and opened the scoring with a Nick Chubb touchdown run. Seattle responded with a touchdown run by Russell Wilson, giving the Browns a 7–6 lead after a missed extra point by Seattle. The Browns then extended their lead to 20–6, with Baker Mayfield running in from 10 yards before throwing a 31-yard touchdown pass to Ricky Seals-Jones. Before halftime, Seattle scored on a pair of Jason Myers field goals and a touchdown pass from Wilson to Jaron Brown to cut the Browns' lead to 20–18. In the second half, Seattle took the lead on another Wilson touchdown pass to Brown, but the Browns responded with a Chubb touchdown run and a two-point pass from Mayfield to Demetrius Harris to retake the lead, 28–25. The Seahawks retook the lead with 3:30 left in the game, going up 32–28 thanks to a Chris Carson touchdown run, before picking off Mayfield on the Browns' ensuing drive to allow them to run down the clock and claim the win.

With the loss, the Browns went into their bye week at 2–4.

==== Week 8: at New England Patriots ====
Week Eight: Cleveland Browns at New England Patriots – Game summary

Quarter	1	2	3	4	Total
Browns	0	7	3	3	**13**
**Patriots**	17	0	7	3	**27**

at Gillette Stadium, Foxborough, Massachusetts

- Date: October 27
- Game time: 4:25 pm. EDT
- Game weather: Rain, 49 °F (9 °C)
- Game attendance: 65,878
- Referee: Tony Corrente
- TV announcers (CBS): Jim Nantz, Tony Romo, Tracy Wolfson and Gene Steratore
- Recap, Game Book

Game information

**First quarter**

- NE – Mike Nugent 20-yard field goal, 6:35. Patriots 3–0. **Drive: 12 plays, 71 yards, 5:53.**
- NE – Dont'a Hightower 26-yard fumble return (Mike Nugent kick), 5:45. Patriots 10–0.
- NE – Julian Edelman 8-yard pass from Tom Brady (Mike Nugent kick), 1:47. Patriots 17–0. **Drive: 2 plays, 11 yards, 0:44.**

**Second quarter**

- CLE – Demetrius Harris 21-yard pass from Baker Mayfield (Austin Seibert kick), 7:44. Patriots 17–7. **Drive: 6 plays, 54 yards, 3:28.**

**Third quarter**

- CLE – Austin Seibert 38-yard field goal, 8:37. Patriots 17–10. **Drive: 12 plays, 55 yards, 6:23.**
- NE – Julian Edelman 14-yard pass from Tom Brady (Mike Nugent kick), 6:11. Patriots 24–10. **Drive: 7 plays, 84 yards, 2:26.**

**Fourth quarter**

- NE – Mike Nugent 29-yard field goal, 7:43. Patriots 27–10. **Drive: 11 plays, 62 yards, 5:27.**
- CLE – Austin Seibert 47-yard field goal, 2:33. Patriots 27–13. **Drive: 7 plays, 47 yards, 1:34.**

**Top passers**

- CLE – Baker Mayfield – 20/31, 194 yards, TD, INT
- NE – Tom Brady – 20/36, 259 yards, 2 TD

**Top rushers**

- CLE – Nick Chubb – 20 rushes, 131 yards
- NE – Sony Michel – 21 rushes, 74 yards

**Top receivers**

- CLE – Jarvis Landry – 5 receptions, 65 yards
- NE – Julian Edelman – 8 receptions, 78 yards, 2 TD

After their bye week, the Browns traveled to New England for a Week 8 contest against the defending Super Bowl champion New England Patriots, who entered this game 7–0. The Patriots raced to a 17–0 first quarter lead, aided by two Nick Chubb fumbles and a Baker Mayfield interception on three consecutive offensive snaps for the Browns. Chubb's first fumble was returned by Dont'a Hightower for a 26–yard touchdown, while the Patriots' second touchdown came on a Tom Brady pass to Julian Edelman. Browns got on the board in the second quarter with a Mayfield touchdown pass to Demetrius Harris, to make the score 17–7 at halftime. In the third quarter, the Browns closed New England's lead to 17–10 with an Austin Seibert 38-yard field goal, but the Patriots responded with another Brady touchdown pass to Edelman on their next drive to extend their lead to 24–10. The teams traded field goals in the fourth quarter for a 27–13 Patriots win.

With the loss, the Browns fell to 2–5.

==== Week 9: at Denver Broncos ====
Week Nine: Cleveland Browns at Denver Broncos – Game summary

Quarter	1	2	3	4	Total
Browns	0	12	0	7	**19**
**Broncos**	7	10	7	0	**24**

at Empower Field at Mile High, Denver, Colorado

- Date: November 3
- Game time: 4:25 pm. EST/2:25 p.m. MST
- Game weather: Mostly Cloudy, 55 °F (13 °C)
- Game attendance: 76,743
- Referee: Bill Vinovich
- TV announcers (CBS): Kevin Harlan, Rich Gannon and Jay Feely
- Recap, Game Book

Game information

**First quarter**

- DEN – Courtland Sutton 21-yard pass from Brandon Allen (Brandon McManus kick), 6:09. Broncos 7–0. **Drive: 9 plays, 63 yards, 4:47.**

**Second quarter**

- CLE – Austin Seibert 39-yard field goal, 12:48. Broncos 7–3. **Drive: 5 plays, 19 yards, 2:20.**
- DEN – Noah Fant 75-yard pass from Brandon Allen (Brandon McManus kick), 12:34. Broncos 14–3. **Drive: 1 play, 75 yards, 0:14.**
- CLE – Austin Seibert 30-yard field goal, 7:14. Broncos 14–6. **Drive: 9 plays, 64 yards, 5:20.**
- CLE – Austin Seibert 27-yard field goal, 3:49. Broncos 14–9. **Drive: 6 plays, 9 yards, 2:22.**
- DEN – Brandon McManus 43-yard field goal, 1:47. Broncos 17–9. **Drive: 5 plays, 43 yards, 2:02.**
- CLE – Austin Seibert 30-yard field goal, 0:15. Broncos 17–12. **Drive: 13 plays, 63 yards, 1:32.**

**Third quarter**

- DEN – Phillip Lindsay 30-yard run (Brandon McManus kick), 1:06. Broncos 24–12. **Drive: 7 plays, 95 yards, 4:10.**

**Fourth quarter**

- CLE – Jarvis Landry 9-yard pass from Baker Mayfield (Austin Seibert kick), 10:47. Broncos 24–19. **Drive: 9 plays, 76 yards, 5:19.**

**Top passers**

- CLE – Baker Mayfield – 27/42, 273 yards, TD
- DEN – Brandon Allen – 12/20, 193 yards, 2 TD

**Top rushers**

- CLE – Nick Chubb – 20 rushes, 65 yards
- DEN – Phillip Lindsay – 9 rushes, 92 yards, TD

**Top receivers**

- CLE – Odell Beckham Jr. – 5 receptions, 87 yards
- DEN – Noah Fant – 3 receptions, 115 yards, TD

The Browns visited the Denver Broncos for a Week 9 match-up. The Browns hoped to end a three-game losing streak while Denver quarterback Brandon Allen was making his first career start in place of an injured Joe Flacco. Denver opened the scoring with an Allen 21–yard touchdown pass to Courtland Sutton. He added a 75–yard touchdown pass to Noah Fant in the second quarter. For the Browns, Austin Seibert kicked four field goals in the second quarter (three of which occurred with the Browns inside Denver's 15-yard line) and Denver's Brandon McManus added a field goal to give the Broncos a 17–12 halftime lead. In the second half, the Broncos extended their lead to 24–12 on a Phillip Lindsay touchdown run, while the Browns closed the Broncos' lead back to five points on a Baker Mayfield touchdown pass to Jarvis Landry. However, the Browns could not score again, resulting in a 24–19 Broncos' win.

With the loss, the Browns fell to 2–6. This marks the 12th straight season in which the Browns suffered a losing streak of at least four games. Following the game, safety Jermaine Whitehead, out of frustration, made inappropriate and threatening tweets in response to critics. He was subsequently released by the Browns.

==== Week 10: vs. Buffalo Bills ====
Week Ten: Buffalo Bills at Cleveland Browns – Game summary

Quarter	1	2	3	4	Total
Bills	0	7	2	7	**16**
**Browns**	6	3	3	7	**19**

at FirstEnergy Stadium, Cleveland, Ohio

- Date: November 10
- Game time: 1:00 pm. EST
- Game weather: Sunny, 50 °F (10 °C)
- Game attendance: 67,431
- Referee: Ronald Torbert
- TV announcers (CBS): Andrew Catalon, James Lofton and Amanda Balionis
- Recap, Game Book

Game information

**First quarter**

- CLE – Jarvis Landry 17-yard pass from Baker Mayfield (kick failed, wide right), 12:09. Browns 6–0. **Drive: 6 plays, 75 yards, 2:51.**

**Second quarter**

- BUF – Josh Allen 10-yard run (Stephen Hauschka kick), 10:09. Bills 7–6. **Drive: 9 plays, 76 yards, 4:40.**
- CLE – Austin Seibert 27-yard field goal, 3:35. Browns 9–7. **Drive: 13 plays, 69 yards, 6:34.**

**Third quarter**

- BUF – Baker Mayfield sacked in end zone by Tremaine Edmunds for a safety, 10:53. Tied 9–9.
- CLE – Austin Seibert 47-yard field goal, 3:49. Browns 12–9. **Drive: 10 plays, 56 yards, 5:01.**

**Fourth quarter**

- BUF – Josh Allen 1-yard run (Stephen Hauschka kick), 5:26. Bills 16–12. **Drive: 7 plays, 48 yards, 3:44.**
- CLE – Rashard Higgins 7-yard pass from Baker Mayfield (Austin Seibert kick), 1:44. Browns 19–16. **Drive: 10 plays, 82 yards, 3:42.**

**Top passers**

- BUF – Josh Allen – 22/41, 266 yards
- CLE – Baker Mayfield – 26/38, 238 yards, 2 TD

**Top rushers**

- BUF – Devin Singletary – 8 rushes, 42 yards
- CLE – Nick Chubb – 20 rushes, 116 yards

**Top receivers**

- BUF – John Brown – 5 receptions, 77 yards
- CLE – Jarvis Landry – 9 receptions, 97 yards, TD

The Browns returned home to take on the Buffalo Bills, hoping to end their 4-game losing streak. The Browns scored a touchdown on the game's first drive on a Baker Mayfield 17-yard touchdown pass to Jarvis Landry. However, an unsportsmanlike conduct penalty on Landry resulted in the PAT attempt being kicked from 15 yards further back, and it was subsequently missed. Early in the second quarter, the Bills scored a touchdown on a Josh Allen 10-yard run to take a 7–6 lead. Browns kicker Austin Seibert nailed a 23-yard field goal, while Bills' kicker Stephen Hauschka missed a 35-yard field goal attempt late in the quarter, giving the Browns a 9–7 halftime lead. The Bills tied the game with a safety in the third quarter as Tremaine Edmunds sacked Mayfield in the end zone. Seibert added a field goal to give the Browns a 12–9 lead after three-quarters. In the fourth quarter, Allen gave the Bills a 16–12 lead on a 1-yard touchdown run. However, the Browns responded with an 82-yard drive culminating with a Mayfield touchdown pass to Rashard Higgins, giving the Browns a 19–16 lead with just under two minutes remaining. The Bills drove down the field, but Hauschka missed a 53-yard potential game-tying field goal with 22 seconds remaining, giving the Browns a 19–16 win.

With the win, the Browns improved to 3–6.

==== Week 11: vs. Pittsburgh Steelers ====
Week Eleven: Pittsburgh Steelers at Cleveland Browns – Game summary

Quarter	1	2	3	4	Total
Steelers	0	0	7	0	**7**
**Browns**	7	7	0	7	**21**

at FirstEnergy Stadium, Cleveland, Ohio

- Date: November 14
- Game time: 8:20 pm. EST
- Game weather: Cold, 36 °F (2 °C)
- Game attendance: 67,431
- Referee: Clete Blakeman
- TV announcers (Fox/NFLN/Amazon Prime): Joe Buck, Troy Aikman, Erin Andrews and Kristina Pink
- Recap, Game Book

Game information

**First quarter**

- CLE – Baker Mayfield 1-yard run (Austin Seibert kick), 11:07. Browns 7–0. **Drive: 5 plays, 65 yards, 2:12.**

**Second quarter**

- CLE – Jarvis Landry 1-yard pass from Baker Mayfield (Austin Seibert kick), 9:55. Browns 14–0. **Drive: 7 plays, 77 yards, 4:03.**

**Third quarter**

- PIT – Jaylen Samuels 3-yard pass from Mason Rudolph (Chris Boswell kick), 5:39. Browns 14–7. **Drive: 5 plays, 87 yards, 2:32.**

**Fourth quarter**

- CLE – Stephen Carlson 8-yard pass from Baker Mayfield (Austin Seibert kick), 5:25. Browns 21–7. **Drive: 3 plays, 4 yards, 0:57.**

**Top passers**

- PIT – Mason Rudolph – 23/44, 221 yards, TD, 4 INT
- CLE – Baker Mayfield – 17/32, 193 yards, 2 TD

**Top rushers**

- PIT – Jaylen Samuels – 5 rushes, 26 yards
- CLE – Nick Chubb – 27 carries, 92 yards

**Top receivers**

- PIT – James Washington – 3 receptions, 49 yards
- CLE – Odell Beckham Jr. – 4 receptions, 60 yards

The Browns stayed home to face the Pittsburgh Steelers on Thursday Night Football. Browns quarterback Baker Mayfield scored the first points on a 1-yard touchdown run in the first quarter, set up by a 43-yard pass from Mayfield to wide receiver Odell Beckham Jr. The next score came in the second quarter, with a 1-yard touchdown catch by Jarvis Landry. The Steelers struck back in the third quarter with a touchdown completion by Steelers running back Jaylen Samuels, but Cleveland held off the Steelers for the win. Browns rookie tight end Stephen Carlson caught a touchdown pass in the fourth quarter for his first career touchdown. The Browns defense forced four interceptions of Steelers quarterback Mason Rudolph in the game.

A skirmish broke out between the two teams in the closing seconds of the game. After passing to Trey Edmunds, Rudolph found himself dragged down by Browns defensive end Myles Garrett. Upset by the late tackle, Rudolph started to attack Garrett by kicking him in the groin and attempting to pull off Garrett's helmet. Garrett then pulled off Rudolph's helmet and used it to hit Rudolph in the head. Steelers center Maurkice Pouncey and Browns defensive tackle Larry Ogunjobi then joined in on the fight in defense of their respective teammates. Garrett, Ogunjobi, and Pouncey were ejected from the game. Following the game, Garrett was suspended for the remainder of 2019 and required to apply for reinstatement in 2020, while Pouncey and Ogunjobi received suspensions of two games and one game, respectively. Garrett's suspension was the first indefinite suspension in NFL history for a single on-field transgression.

Landry recorded his 529th reception, breaking DeAndre Hopkins' record of most catches in an NFL player's first six seasons.

With the win, the Browns improved to 4–6. The win ended an 8-game winless streak to the Steelers that dated back to 2014. This also marked the first time in franchise history that the Browns defeated division rivals Baltimore and Pittsburgh in the same season.

==== Week 12: vs. Miami Dolphins ====
Week Twelve: Miami Dolphins at Cleveland Browns – Game summary

Quarter	1	2	3	4	Total
Dolphins	0	3	14	7	**24**
**Browns**	14	14	0	13	**41**

at FirstEnergy Stadium, Cleveland, Ohio

- Date: November 24
- Game time: 1:00 pm. EST
- Game weather: Partly Cloudy, 39 °F (4 °C)
- Game attendance: 67,431
- Referee: Brad Rogers
- TV announcers (Fox): Chris Myers, Daryl Johnston and Laura Okmin
- Recap, Game Book

Game information

**First quarter**

- CLE – Jarvis Landry 7-yard pass from Baker Mayfield (Austin Seibert kick), 9:59. Browns 7–0. **Drive: 8 plays, 75 yards, 5:01.**
- CLE – Odell Beckham Jr. 35-yard pass from Baker Mayfield (Austin Seibert kick), 1:51. Browns 14–0. **Drive: 5 plays, 60 yards, 2:54.**

**Second quarter**

- CLE – Jarvis Landry 5-yard pass from Baker Mayfield (Austin Seibert kick), 10:31. Browns 21–0. **Drive: 6 plays, 44 yards, 3:39.**
- CLE – Kareem Hunt 6-yard run (Austin Seibert kick), 1:01. Browns 28–0. **Drive: 9 plays, 73 yards, 4:45.**
- MIA – Jason Sanders 36-yard field goal, 0:00. Browns 28–3. **Drive: 9 plays, 63 yards, 1:01.**

**Third quarter**

- MIA – Mike Gesicki 11-yard pass from Ryan Fitzpatrick (Jason Sanders kick), 9:37. Browns 28–10 . **Drive: 7 plays, 46 yards, 2:57.**
- MIA – Ryan Fitzpatrick 8-yard run (Jason Sanders kick), 0:04. Browns 28–17. **Drive: 11 plays, 64 yards, 4:00.**

**Fourth quarter**

- CLE – Austin Seibert 40-yard field goal, 11:21. Browns 31–17. **Drive: 10 plays, 64 yards, 3:43.**
- CLE – Austin Seibert 26-yard field goal, 6:51. Browns 34–17. **Drive: 8 plays, 67 yards, 2:57.**
- CLE – Nick Chubb 5-yard run (Austin Seibert kick), 3:36. Browns 41–17. **Drive: 4 plays, 38 yards, 2:22.**
- MIA – Allen Hurns 7-yard pass from Ryan Fitzpatrick (Jason Sanders kick), 0:39. Browns 41–24. **Drive: 7 plays, 78 yards, 2:47.**

**Top passers**

- MIA – Ryan Fitzpatrick – 21/39, 214 yards, 2 TD, 2 INT
- CLE – Baker Mayfield – 24/34, 327 yards, 3 TD, INT

**Top rushers**

- MIA – Ryan Fitzpatrick – 5 rushes, 45 yards, TD
- CLE – Nick Chubb – 21 rushes, 106 yards, TD

**Top receivers**

- MIA – Devante Parker – 6 receptions, 91 yards
- CLE – Jarvis Landry – 10 receptions, 148 yards, 2 TD

The Browns hosted the Miami Dolphins in their third straight home game. The Browns dominated the first half, building a 28–0 lead in the process. The Browns scored four first half touchdowns on three Baker Mayfield touchdown passes (two short passes to Jarvis Landry and a 35-yard pass to Odell Beckham Jr.) and a 6-yard run by Kareem Hunt. The Dolphins got on the board with a Jason Sanders field goal to make the score 28–3 at halftime. The Dolphins came back in the third quarter. Aided by a Mayfield interception and a missed field goal by Austin Seibert, the Dolphins scored two touchdowns on a Ryan Fitzpatrick 11-yard pass to Mike Gesicki and a Fitzpatrick 8-yard run, to close the Browns' lead to 28–17. However, the Browns responded in the fourth quarter with a pair of Seibert field goals and a Nick Chubb 5-yard touchdown run to go up 41–17. A late Miami touchdown made the final score 41–24.

With the win, the Browns improved to 5–6. This marked the Browns' 100th win since returning to the NFL in 1999. Linebacker Joe Schobert was named the AFC Defensive Player of the week after recording five tackles, four blocked passes, and two interceptions.

==== Week 13: at Pittsburgh Steelers ====
Week Thirteen: Cleveland Browns at Pittsburgh Steelers – Game summary

Quarter	1	2	3	4	Total
Browns	3	7	0	3	**13**
**Steelers**	0	10	7	3	**20**

at Heinz Field, Pittsburgh, Pennsylvania

- Date: December 1
- Game time: 1:00 pm. EST
- Game weather: Mostly Cloudy, 46 °F (8 °C)
- Game attendance: 62,157
- Referee: Clay Martin
- TV announcers (CBS): Ian Eagle, Dan Fouts and Evan Washburn
- Recap, Game Book

Game information

**First quarter**

- CLE – Austin Seibert 31-yard field goal, 7:31. Browns 3–0. **Drive: 13 plays, 62 yards, 7:29.**

**Second quarter**

- CLE – Kareem Hunt 15-yard pass from Baker Mayfield. (Austin Seibert kick), 7:40. Browns 10–0. **Drive: 10 plays, 70 yards, 5:42.**
- PIT – Chris Boswell 39-yard field goal, 2:56. Browns 10–3. **Drive: 10 plays, 62 yards, 4:44.**
- PIT – James Washington 30-yard pass from Devlin Hodges (Chris Boswell kick), 1:00. Tied 10–10. **Drive: 5 plays, 69 yards, 0:48.**

**Third quarter**

- PIT – Benny Snell 1-yard run (Chris Boswell kick), 10:36. Steelers 17–10. **Drive: 7 plays, 69 yards, 4:24.**

**Fourth quarter**

- PIT – Chris Boswell 29-yard field goal, 13:48. Steelers 20–10. **Drive: 10 plays, 35 yards, 6:01.**
- CLE – Austin Seibert 34-yard field goal, 7:30. Steelers 20–13. **Drive: 7 plays, 61 yards, 2:48.**

**Top passers**

- CLE – Baker Mayfield – 18/32, 196 yards, TD, INT
- PIT – Devlin Hodges – 14/21, 212 yards, TD, INT

**Top rushers**

- CLE – Nick Chubb – 16 rushes, 58 yards
- PIT – Benny Snell – 16 rushes, 63 yards, TD

**Top receivers**

- CLE – Jarvis Landry – 6 receptions, 76 yards
- PIT – James Washington – 4 receptions, 111 yards, TD

The Browns traveled to Pittsburgh for round two of their division rivalry with the Steelers. In the first quarter, the Browns scored first on an Austin Seibert 31-yard field goal. They extended their lead to 10–0 in the second quarter on a Baker Mayfield 15-yard touchdown pass to Kareem Hunt. The Steelers, however tied the game 10–10 before halftime with a Chris Boswell 39-yard field goal followed by a Devlin Hodges 30-yard touchdown pass to James Washington. In the third quarter, the Steelers took a 17–10 lead when Benny Snell ran for a 1-yard touchdown and added a Boswell 29-yard field goal to make it 20–10. Seibert got the Browns within a touchdown at 20–13 on a 34-yard field goal to make it 20–13. Getting the ball back later on in the quarter, the Browns had an opportunity to score a game-tying touchdown, However, Steelers cornerback and former Brown Joe Haden came up with the game-sealing interception of Mayfield.

With the loss, the Browns fell to 5–7. This marked the Browns' 16th consecutive loss in Pittsburgh. On the same day, the Baltimore Ravens won their game, thus mathematically eliminating the Browns from AFC North title contention. This is the Browns 27th consecutive season without a division title, the longest active streak in the NFL.

==== Week 14: vs. Cincinnati Bengals ====
Week Fourteen: Cincinnati Bengals at Cleveland Browns – Game summary

Quarter	1	2	3	4	Total
Bengals	6	7	3	3	**19**
**Browns**	7	7	10	3	**27**

at FirstEnergy Stadium, Cleveland, Ohio

- Date: December 8
- Game time: 1:00 pm. EST
- Game weather: Sunny, 48 °F (9 °C)
- Game attendance: 67,431
- Referee: Carl Cheffers
- TV announcers (CBS): Beth Mowins and Tiki Barber
- Recap, Game Book

Game information

**First quarter**

- CIN – Randy Bullock 34-yard field goal, 10:56. Bengals 3-0. **Drive: 8 plays, 59 yards, 4:04.**
- CLE – Denzel Ward 61-yard interception return (Austin Seibert kick), 5:36. Browns 7-3.
- CIN – Randy Bullock 44-yard field goal, 1:37. Browns 7-6. **Drive: 7 plays, 50 yards, 3:59.**

**Second quarter**

- CIN – Joe Mixon 1-yard run (Randy Bullock kick), 12:07. Bengals 13-7. **Drive: 6 plays, 57 yards, 3:21.**
- CLE – Baker Mayfield 7-yard run (Austin Seibert kick), 6:37. Browns 14-13. **Drive: 10 plays, 75 yards, 5:30.**

**Third quarter**

- CLE – Kareem Hunt 3-yard run (Austin Seibert kick), 12:10. Browns 21-13. **Drive: 6 plays, 75 yards, 2:50.**
- CIN – Randy Bullock 28-yard field goal, 4:39. Browns 21-16. **Drive: 16 plays, 76 yards, 7:31.**
- CLE – Austin Seibert 53-yard field goal, 0:16. Browns 24-16. **Drive: 8 plays, 40 yards, 4:23.**

**Fourth quarter**

- CLE – Austin Seibert 31-yard field goal, 1:06. Browns 27-16. **Drive: 14 plays, 85 yards, 6:08.**

**Top passers**

- CIN – Andy Dalton – 22/38, 262 yards, INT
- CLE – Baker Mayfield – 11/24, 192 yards, 2 INT

**Top rushers**

- CIN – Joe Mixon – 23 rushes, 146 yards, TD
- CLE – Nick Chubb – 15 rushes, 106 yards

**Top receivers**

- CIN – Tyler Boyd – 5 receptions, 75 yards
- CLE – Jarvis Landry – 4 receptions, 76 yards

The Browns returned home to battle their in-state rival Cincinnati Bengals. Cincinnati took an early 3–0 lead on a Randy Bullock 34-yard field goal. The Browns got on the board later in the first quarter as Denzel Ward intercepted an Andy Dalton pass and returned it 61 yards for a touchdown to take a 7–3 lead. Bullock added a 44-yard field goal to bring the Bengals to within 7–6 after the first quarter. Both teams scored a touchdown in the second quarter: the Bengals' coming on a Joe Mixon 1-yard run and the Browns' on a Baker Mayfield 7-yard run to give the Browns a 14–13 halftime lead. On the Browns' opening drive of the third quarter, they scored a touchdown on a Kareem Hunt 3-yard run to extend their lead to 21–13. The teams traded field goals to finish off the third quarter and also did so in the fourth quarter, to give the Browns a 27–19 win.

With the win, the Browns improved to 6–7.

==== Week 15: at Arizona Cardinals ====
Week Fifteen: Cleveland Browns at Arizona Cardinals – Game summary

Quarter	1	2	3	4	Total
Browns	0	10	7	7	**24**
**Cardinals**	7	14	7	10	**38**

at State Farm Stadium, Glendale, Arizona

- Date: December 15
- Game time: 4:05 pm. EST/2:05 pm. MST
- Game weather: Sunny, 66 °F (19 °C) (retractable roof open)
- Game attendance: 63,345
- Referee: Brad Allen
- TV announcers (CBS): Tom McCarthy and Jay Feely
- Recap, Game Book

Game information

**First quarter**

- ARI - Kenyan Drake 5-yard run (Zane Gonzalez kick), 10:09. Cardinals 7-0. **Drive: 10 plays, 90 yards, 4:51.**

**Second quarter**

- ARI - Kenyan Drake 1-yard run (Zane Gonzalez kick), 12:02. Cardinals 14-0. **Drive: 6 plays, 67 yards, 3:18.**
- CLE - Nick Chubb 33-yard run (Austin Seibert kick), 7:50. Cardinals 14-7. **Drive: 7 plays, 83 yards, 4:12.**
- CLE - Austin Seibert 44-yard field goal, 4:33. Cardinals 14-10. **Drive: 4 plays, 2 yards, 2:12.**
- ARI - Dan Arnold 6-yard pass from Kyler Murray (Zane Gonzalez kick), 0:25. Cardinals 21-10. **Drive: 11 plays, 87 yards, 4:08.**

**Third quarter**

- CLE - Ricky Seals-Jones 2-yard pass from Baker Mayfield (Austin Seibert kick), 8:54. Cardinals 21-17. **Drive: 11 plays, 75 yards, 6:06.**
- ARI - Kenyan Drake 1-yard run (Zane Gonzalez kick), 1:40. Cardinals 28-17. **Drive: 6 plays, 61 yards, 3:06.**

**Fourth quarter**

- ARI - Kenyan Drake 17-yard run (Zane Gonzalez kick), 7:25. Cardinals 35-17. **Drive: 8 plays, 65 yards, 4:40.**
- ARI - Zane Gonzalez 21-yard field goal, 5:18., Cardinals 38-17. **Drive: 6 plays, 27 yards, 1:55.**
- CLE - Ricky Seals-Jones 1-yard pass from Baker Mayfield (Austin Seibert kick), 1:21. Cardinals 38-24. **Drive: 19 plays, 91 yards, 3:57.**

**Top passers**

- ARI - Kyler Murray - 19/25, 219 yards, TD, INT
- CLE - Baker Mayfield - 30/43, 247 yards, 2 TD, INT

**Top rushers**

- ARI - Kenyan Drake - 22 rushes, 137 yards, 4 TD
- CLE - Nick Chubb - 17 rushes, 127 yards, TD

**Top receivers**

- ARI - Damiere Byrd - 6 receptions, 86 yards
- CLE - Odell Beckham Jr. - 8 receptions, 66 yards

The Browns traveled to Arizona for a Week 15 tilt with the Arizona Cardinals. The Cardinals scored the only first quarter points on a Kenyan Drake 5-yard touchdown run, to take a 7–0 lead. The Cardinals extended their lead to 14–0 in the second quarter with a Drake 1-yard touchdown run. The Browns responded with a Nick Chubb 33-yard touchdown run and an Austin Seibert 44-yard field goal to close the Cardinals' lead to 14–10. However, the Cardinals extended their lead to 21–10 late in the first half on a Kyler Murray 6-yard touchdown pass to Dan Arnold. In the third quarter, the Browns scored a touchdown on a Baker Mayfield 2-yard touchdown pass to Ricky Seals-Jones, but the Cardinals responded with a Drake 1-yard run to take a 28–17 lead into the fourth quarter. Early in the fourth quarter, Seibert missed a 45–yard field goal attempt wide left that would have moved the Browns to within one possession at 28–20. Instead, the Cardinals scored a touchdown on their ensuing drive on a Drake 17-yard run, his fourth touchdown on the day. After a Seals-Jones fumble, former Brown Zane Gonzalez kicked a 21-yard field goal to give the Cardinals a 38–17 lead. The Browns added a late touchdown on a Mayfield pass to Seals-Jones to make the final score 38–24.

With the loss, the Browns fell to 6–8.

==== Week 16: vs. Baltimore Ravens ====
Week Sixteen: Baltimore Ravens at Cleveland Browns – Game summary

Quarter	1	2	3	4	Total
**Ravens**	0	14	7	10	**31**
Browns	0	6	3	6	**15**

at FirstEnergy Stadium, Cleveland, Ohio

- Date: December 22
- Game time: 1:00 pm. EST
- Game weather: Sunny, 49 °F (9 °C)
- Game attendance: 67,431
- Referee: Alex Kemp
- TV announcers (CBS): Jim Nantz, Tony Romo, Tracy Wolfson and Gene Steratore
- Recap, Game Book

Game information

**First quarter**

- No scoring plays.

**Second quarter**

- CLE – Demetrius Harris 1-yard pass from Baker Mayfield (kick failed, wide left), 11:53. Browns 6–0. **Drive: 9 plays, 45 yards, 5:19.**
- BAL – Mark Andrews 39-yard pass from Lamar Jackson (Justin Tucker kick), 1:18. Ravens 7–6. **Drive: 2 plays, 63 yards, 0:32.**
- BAL – Mark Andrews 14-yard pass from Lamar Jackson (Justin Tucker kick), 0:09. Ravens 14–6. **Drive: 7 plays, 75 yards, 0:46.**

**Third quarter**

- BAL – Mark Ingram II 12-yard pass from Lamar Jackson (Justin Tucker kick), 7:36. Ravens 21–6. **Drive: 13 plays, 69 yards, 7:24.**
- CLE – Austin Seibert 47-yard field goal, 3:25. Ravens 21–9. **Drive: 10 plays, 46 yards, 4:11.**

**Fourth quarter**

- BAL – Justin Tucker 31-yard field goal, 11:32. Ravens 24–9. **Drive: 12 plays, 62 yards, 6:53.**
- CLE – Odell Beckham Jr. 3-yard pass from Baker Mayfield (pass failed), 8:01. Ravens 24–15. **Drive: 9 plays, 75 yards, 3:31.**
- BAL – Justice Hill – 18-yard run (Justin Tucker kick), 3:39. Ravens 31–15. **Drive: 8 plays, 84 yards, 4:22.**

**Top passers**

- BAL – Lamar Jackson – 20/31, 238 yards, 3 TD
- CLE – Baker Mayfield – 20/33, 192 yards, 2 TD, INT

**Top rushers**

- BAL – Lamar Jackson – 17 rushes, 103 yards
- CLE – Nick Chubb – 15 rushes, 45 yards

**Top receivers**

- BAL – Mark Andrews – 6 receptions, 93 yards, 2 TD
- CLE – Jarvis Landry – 7 receptions, 74 yards

With the loss, the Browns fell to 6–9. The loss eliminated the Browns from postseason contention for the 17th consecutive season, having last made the playoffs in 2002. The Browns were one of only two NFL teams, the other being the Tampa Bay Buccaneers, to not make the playoffs during the 2010s. The loss also meant the Browns would not improve upon their 7–8–1 record from their previous season, and it ensured the team's 12th consecutive season with a losing record, having last posted a non-losing record in 2007. The Browns finished 4–4 at home.

==== Week 17: at Cincinnati Bengals ====
Week Seventeen: Cleveland Browns at Cincinnati Bengals – Game summary

Quarter	1	2	3	4	Total
Browns	7	9	0	7	**23**
**Bengals**	13	7	3	10	**33**

at Paul Brown Stadium, Cincinnati, Ohio

- Date: December 29
- Game time: 1:00 pm. EST
- Game weather: Rain, 64 °F (18 °C)
- Game attendance: 47,759
- Referee: Adrian Hill
- TV announcers (Fox): Brandon Gaudin, Robert Smith and Megan Olivi
- Recap, Game Book

Game information

**First quarter**

- CLE – Damion Ratley 46-yard pass from Baker Mayfield (Austin Seibert kick), 13:32. Browns 7-0. **Drive: 3 plays, 56 yards, 1:28.**
- CIN – C. J. Uzomah 15-yard pass from Andy Dalton (Randy Bullock kick), 9:53. Tied 7-7. **Drive: 7 plays, 79 yards, 3:39.**
- CIN – Joe Mixon 3-yard run (kick failed), 4:45. Bengals 13-7. **Drive: 3 plays, 3 yards, 0:43.**

**Second quarter**

- CIN – Andy Dalton 5-yard run (Randy Bullock kick), 10:06. Bengals 20-7. **Drive: 12 plays, 66 yards, 5:42.**
- CLE – Austin Seibert 42-yard field goal, 6:53. Bengals 20-10. **Drive: 7 plays, 62 yards, 3:13.**
- CLE – Jarvis Landry 56-yard pass from Baker Mayfield (kick failed), 1:52. Bengals 20-16. **Drive: 5 plays, 81 yards, 1:52.**

**Third quarter**

- CIN – Randy Bullock 47-yard field goal, 9:04. Bengals 23-16. **Drive: 10 plays, 46 yards, 5:56.**

**Fourth quarter**

- CIN – Joe Mixon 2-yard run (Randy Bullock kick), 14:16. Bengals 30-16. **Drive: 9 plays, 74 yards, 5:16.**
- CLE – Odell Beckham Jr. 20-yard pass from Baker Mayfield (Austin Seibert kick), 7:16. Bengals 30-23. **Drive: 13 plays, 75 yards, 7:00.**

**Top passers**

- CIN – Andy Dalton – 16/28, 190 yards, TD, INT
- CLE – Baker Mayfield – 12/27, 279 yards, 3 TD, 3 INT

**Top rushers**

- CIN – Joe Mixon – 26 rushes, 162 yards
- CLE – Nick Chubb – 13 rushes, 41 yards

**Top receivers**

- CIN – Tyler Boyd – 5 receptions, 59 yards
- CLE – Jarvis Landry – 2 receptions, 82 yards, TD

With the loss, the Browns finished the season 6–10. They finished 2–6 in away games. This marked the Browns' 500th loss since joining the NFL in 1950.

Following the game, the Browns fired head coach Freddie Kitchens after one season. On December 31, the Browns and general manager John Dorsey mutually agreed to part ways. Dorsey had served as the Browns' GM since December 2017.

=== Standings ===
==== Division ====
AFC North
	W	L	T	PCT	DIV	CONF	PF	PA	STK
^{(1)} Baltimore Ravens	14	2	0	.875	5–1	10–2	531	282	W12
Pittsburgh Steelers	8	8	0	.500	3–3	6–6	289	303	L3
Cleveland Browns	6	10	0	.375	3–3	6–6	335	393	L3
Cincinnati Bengals	2	14	0	.125	1–5	2–10	279	420	W1

==== Conference ====
AFC
#	Team	Division	W	L	T	PCT	DIV	CONF	SOS	SOV	STK
**Division leaders**
1	Baltimore Ravens	North	14	2	0	.875	5–1	10–2	.494	.484	W12
2 (Note: Kansas City claimed the No. 2 seed over New England based on head-to-head victory.)	Kansas City Chiefs	West	12	4	0	.750	6–0	9–3	.510	.477	W6
3	New England Patriots	East	12	4	0	.750	5–1	8–4	.469	.411	L1
4	Houston Texans	South	10	6	0	.625	4–2	8–4	.520	.488	L1
**Wild Cards**
5	Buffalo Bills	East	10	6	0	.625	3–3	7–5	.461	.363	L2
6	Tennessee Titans	South	9	7	0	.563	3–3	7–5	.488	.465	W1
**Did not qualify for the postseason**
7	Pittsburgh Steelers	North	8	8	0	.500	3–3	6–6	.502	.324	L3
8 (Note: Denver finished ahead of Indianapolis and NY Jets based on conference record. Division tiebreak was initially used to eliminate Oakland (see below).) (Note: Denver finished ahead of Oakland based on conference record.)	Denver Broncos	West	7	9	0	.438	3–3	6–6	.510	.406	W2
9 (Note: Oakland and Indianapolis finished ahead of NY Jets based on conference record.) (Note: Oakland finished ahead of Indianapolis based on head-to-head victory.)	Oakland Raiders	West	7	9	0	.438	3–3	5–7	.482	.335	L1
10	Indianapolis Colts	South	7	9	0	.438	3–3	5–7	.492	.500	L1
11	New York Jets	East	7	9	0	.438	2–4	4–8	.473	.402	W2
12 (Note: Jacksonville finished ahead of Cleveland based on record against common opponents. Jacksonville's cumulative record against Cincinnati, Denver, NY Jets, and Tennessee was 4–1, compared to Cleveland's 2–3 cumulative record against the same four teams.)	Jacksonville Jaguars	South	6	10	0	.375	2–4	6–6	.484	.406	W1
13	Cleveland Browns	North	6	10	0	.375	3–3	6–6	.533	.479	L3
14 (Note: LA Chargers finished ahead of Miami based on head-to-head victory.)	Los Angeles Chargers	West	5	11	0	.313	0–6	3–9	.514	.488	L3
15	Miami Dolphins	East	5	11	0	.313	2–4	4–8	.484	.463	W2
16	Cincinnati Bengals	North	2	14	0	.125	1–5	2–10	.553	.406	W1
**Tiebreakers** (Note: When breaking ties for three or more teams under the NFL's rules, they are first broken within divisions, then comparing only the highest ranked remaining team from each division.)

=== Team leaders ===
Category	Player(s)	Value
Passing yards	Baker Mayfield	3,827
Passing touchdowns	Baker Mayfield	22
Rushing yards	Nick Chubb	1,494
Rushing touchdowns	Nick Chubb	8
Receptions	Jarvis Landry	83
Receiving yards	Jarvis Landry	1,174
Receiving touchdowns	Jarvis Landry	6
Points	Austin Seibert	105
Kickoff return yards	Dontrell Hilliard	421
Punt return yards	Dontrell Hilliard	107
Tackles	Joe Schobert	133
Sacks	Myles Garrett	10.0
Forced fumbles	Sheldon Richardson	3
Interceptions	Joe Schobert	4
Pass deflections	Denzel Ward	11

== Individual honors ==
On December 17, RB Nick Chubb and WR Jarvis Landry were named to the AFC Roster for the 2020 Pro Bowl. This marked Chubb's first Pro Bowl selection and Landry's fifth consecutive and fifth overall selection. Chubb was the AFC's starting running back. On January 9, 2020, G Joel Bitonio was also named to the Pro Bowl as an injury replacement, marking his second consecutive and second overall selection.

In addition, LB Joe Schobert was named a second alternate, CB Denzel Ward a fourth alternate, and WR Odell Beckham Jr. a fifth alternate at their respective positions.

On January 3, Bitonio was named to the AP All-Pro second team, his second consecutive and second overall All-Pro selection.
