= Terrance Mitchell =

American football player (born 1992)

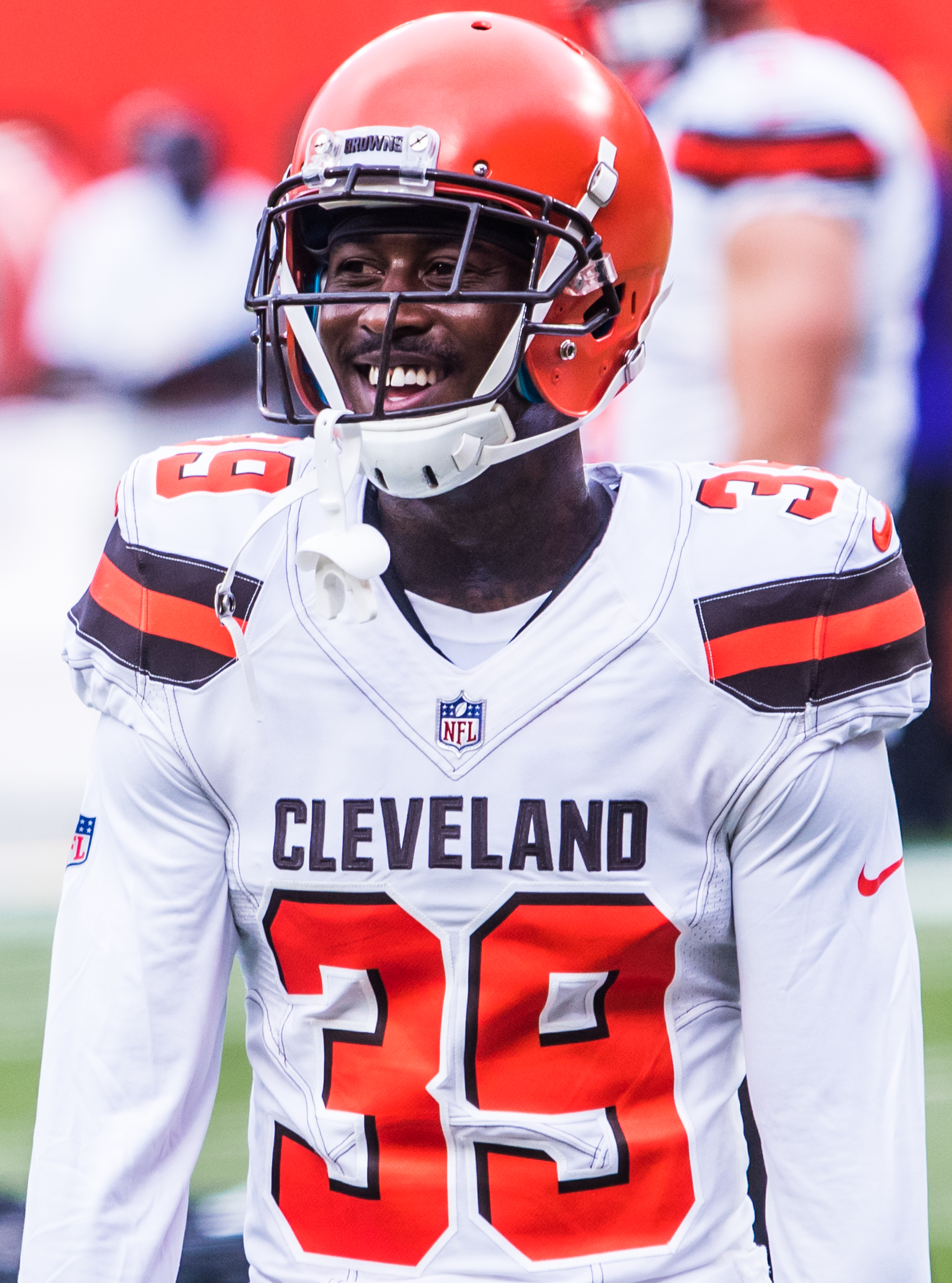
- Mitchell with the Cleveland Browns in 2018

No. 20, 21, 39
- Position: Cornerback

Personal information
- Born: May 17, 1992 (age 34); Sacramento, California, U.S.
- Listed height: 5 ft 11 in (1.80 m)
- Listed weight: 191 lb (87 kg)

Career information
- High school: Luther Burbank (Sacramento)
- College: Oregon (2010–2013)
- NFL draft: 2014: 7th round, 254th overall pick

Career history
- Dallas Cowboys (2014)*; Chicago Bears (2014–2015); Dallas Cowboys (2015); Houston Texans (2016)*; Kansas City Chiefs (2016–2017); Cleveland Browns (2018–2020); Houston Texans (2021); New England Patriots (2022)*; Tennessee Titans (2022); San Francisco 49ers (2023)*
- * Offseason or practice squad member only

Career NFL statistics
- Total tackles: 308
- Sacks: 1.0
- Forced fumbles: 10
- Fumble recoveries: 1
- Pass deflections: 63
- Interceptions: 9
- Stats at Pro Football Reference

Terrance Mitchell II (born May 17, 1992) is an American former professional football player who was a cornerback in the National Football League (NFL). He was selected by the Dallas Cowboys in the seventh round of the 2014 NFL draft. He played college football for the Oregon Ducks.

== Early life ==
Mitchell attended Luther Burbank High School in Sacramento, California, where he played cornerback and running back for the Burbank Titans high school football team.

As a senior, he earned Metro League Offensive MVP honors after registering 2,360 all-purpose yards, 48 receptions, and 24 touchdowns. On defense, he received All-Metro honors after he tallied 6 interceptions, a forced fumble and one blocked field goal.

He also lettered in basketball. Considered a three-star recruit by Rivals.com, he was listed as the No. 33 cornerback in the nation in 2010.

== College career ==
Mitchell accepted a football scholarship from the University of Oregon. As a redshirt freshman, he earned the starting left cornerback job, registering 45 tackles, 10 passes defensed (sixth in the Pac-12 Conference), 2 interceptions and 3 forced fumbles.

As a sophomore, he tallied 40 tackles (ninth on the team) and 8 passes defensed.

As a junior, he finished with 59 tackles (ninth on the team), 7 passes defensed, 5 interceptions (led the team) and one forced fumble. He announced on January 2, 2014, that he would forgo his senior season and enter the NFL draft.

He finished his collegiate career with 38 starts in 40 games, 144 tackles, 7 interceptions, 25 passes defensed (tied for 10th place in school history) and 4 forced fumbles.

== Professional career ==
Pre-draft measurables
Height	Weight	Arm length	Hand span	40-yard dash	10-yard split	20-yard split	20-yard shuttle	Three-cone drill	Vertical jump	Broad jump	Bench press
5 ft 11 1/8 in (1.81 m)	192 lb (87 kg)	30 1/8 in (0.77 m)	8 1/2 in (0.22 m)	4.52 s	1.53 s	2.63 s	4.00 s	6.57 s	34 in (0.86 m)	10 ft 1 in (3.07 m)	8 reps
All values from NFL Combine/Oregon's Pro Day

=== Dallas Cowboys ===
The Dallas Cowboys selected Mitchell in the seventh round (254th overall) of the 2014 NFL draft. Mitchell was the 33rd and final cornerback drafted. His fall in the draft was speculated to be due to his performance at the NFL Combine, as teams deemed him too slow to play cornerback.

On May 15, 2014, the Cowboys signed Mitchell to a four-year, $2.265 million contract that includes a signing bonus of $45,896. As a rookie, he was ineligible to participate in organized team activities (OTAs) until the University of Oregon classes ended. Throughout training camp, Mitchell competed for a roster spot as a backup cornerback against Sterling Moore, B. W. Webb, Tyler Patmon, and Dashaun Phillips. On August 30, the Cowboys waived Mitchell.

=== Chicago Bears ===
On September 1, 2014, the Chicago Bears signed Mitchell to their practice squad. On October 13, the Bears elevated Mitchell to their active roster, but remained inactive as a healthy scratch for the last ten games of the regular season.

Throughout training camp in 2015, Mitchell competed for a roster spot as a backup cornerback against Alan Ball, Demontre Hurst, Al Louis-Jean, Sherrick McManis, Jacoby Glenn, Qumain Black, and Bryce Callahan. Head coach John Fox named Mitchell the fourth cornerback on the depth chart to begin the regular season, behind Kyle Fuller, Alan Ball, and Sherrick McManis.

In 2015, a notable preseason allowed Mitchell to make the roster by beating out Tim Jennings. He was sidelined after Week 5 with a hamstring injury. On November 17, 2015, Mitchell was released by the team to clear roster space for cornerback Jacoby Glenn. On November 19, he was re-signed to Chicago's practice squad. However, Mitchell was released by the Bears four days later.

=== Dallas Cowboys (second stint) ===
On December 2, 2015, Mitchell was signed by the Cowboys to the practice squad. With cornerback Orlando Scandrick out with a season ending knee injury and Tyler Patmon struggling, Mitchell was promoted to the active roster on December 18 and was named the team's nickel cornerback. In his first game against the New York Jets, he registered a pass defensed and an interception, becoming one of two cornerbacks on the team to have an interception on the year. Against the Washington Redskins, Mitchell sacked quarterback Colt McCoy, forcing a fumble. In three games, he registered 12 tackles, one sack, one interception, and two passes defensed.

In 2016, Mitchell was used at nickel back and safety during OTAs. He was released by the Cowboys on June 10, 2016.

=== Houston Texans ===
On June 13, 2016, Mitchell was claimed off waivers by the Houston Texans, intended to replace rookie cornerback Richard Leonard, who suffered a torn hamstring. He was released by Houston on September 3.

=== Kansas City Chiefs ===
On September 6, 2016, Mitchell was signed to the Kansas City Chiefs' practice squad. He was promoted to the active roster on October 18. Mitchell was released by Kansas City on November 8, and was re-signed to the team's practice squad the next day. He was promoted back to the active roster on November 25, to be the third cornerback.

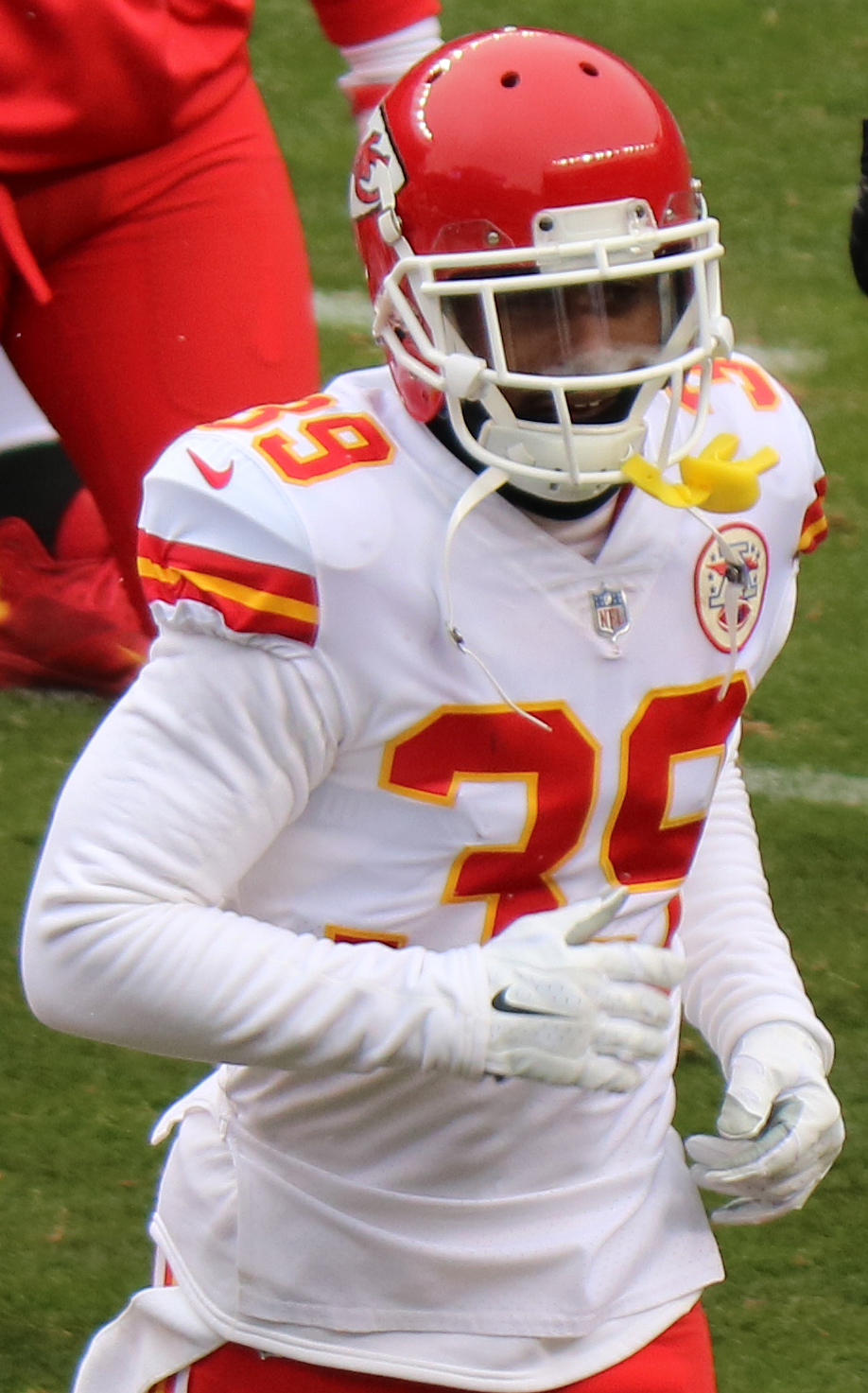
Mitchell with the Chiefs in 2017

In 2017, Mitchell began the season as a starter at right cornerback for seven games in place of an injured Steven Nelson. In Week 3, he recorded two interceptions and nine tackles in a 24–10 victory over the Los Angeles Chargers. Mitchell's performance against the Chargers was the first multi-interception game of his professional career. On October 30, Nelson was activated to play against the Denver Broncos and Mitchell returned to a backup role behind Kenneth Acker. He finished the season with nine starts in 15 appearances, and logged four interceptions.

=== Cleveland Browns ===
On March 15, 2018, Mitchell signed a three-year, $12 million contract with the Cleveland Browns, reuniting with John Dorsey who was the general manager with the Chiefs. He forced two fumbles and recovered one, in the team's 21–18 loss in Week 2 against the New Orleans Saints. Mitchell had a game-sealing interception in the third game 21–17 win against the New York Jets. Mitchell started the first four games of the season at right cornerback, before suffering a broken wrist in Week 4 against the Oakland Raiders. He was placed on injured reserve on October 2. Mitchell was activated off injured reserve on December 8. He started three of the last four games, tallying 19 tackles and 3 passes defensed. Mitchell finished the season with 38 tackles, one interception, six passes defensed, two forced fumbles, and one fumble recovery.

In 2019, Mitchell appeared in 15 games (including four starts), collecting 21 tackles and one interception. He did not play a snap in the team's Week 7 matchup against the New England Patriots.

In 2020, second-year player Greedy Williams was expected to be the starter at right cornerback opposite Denzel Ward, but was lost for the season with a nerve injury in his shoulder that he suffered midway through training camp. Mitchell was named the starter instead for all 16 games and both playoff contests. He posted 65 tackles (two for loss), three forced fumbles, and 13 passes defensed.

=== Houston Texans (second stint) ===
On March 24, 2021, Mitchell signed a two-year contract worth up to $7.5 million with the Texans. He was named a starting cornerback in 2021, recording 60 tackles, three forced fumbles, 10 passes defensed and one interceptions in 14 games and 13 starts.

On March 10, 2022, Mitchell was released by the Texans.

=== New England Patriots ===
On March 16, 2022, Mitchell signed a one-year contract worth $3 million with the New England Patriots. He was released on August 30, and was re-signed to the team's practice squad the next day.

=== Tennessee Titans ===
On September 21, 2022, Mitchell was signed by the Tennessee Titans off of the Patriots practice squad. He was placed on injured reserve on December 22.

=== San Francisco 49ers ===
On July 25, 2023, Mitchell signed with the San Francisco 49ers on a one-year contract. He was placed on injured reserve on August 3. Mitchell and the 49ers reached an injury settlement six days later. He was re-signed to the team's practice squad on January 10, 2024.

== NFL career statistics ==
Legend
**Bold**	Career high

=== Regular season ===
Year	Team	Games		Tackles					Interceptions					Fumbles			
Year	Team	GP	GS	Cmb	Solo	Ast	Sck	TFL	Int	Yds	TD	Lng	PD	FF	FR	Yds	TD
2015	CHI	5	0	1	1	0	0.0	0	0	0	0	0	1	0	0	0	0
2015	DAL	3	0	12	9	3	**1.0**	0	1	-2	0	-2	2	1	0	0	0
2016	KAN	7	2	19	17	2	0.0	0	0	0	0	0	6	0	0	0	0
2017	KAN	15	9	53	48	5	0.0	0	**4**	**40**	0	0	**18**	0	0	0	0
2018	CLE	8	7	38	34	4	0.0	0	1	0	0	0	6	2	**1**	0	0
2019	CLE	15	4	21	17	4	0.0	**2**	1	28	0	**28**	3	0	0	0	0
2020	CLE	**16**	**16**	**65**	**54**	11	0.0	**2**	0	0	0	0	13	**3**	0	0	0
2021	HOU	14	13	60	45	**15**	0.0	1	1	22	0	22	10	**3**	0	0	0
2022	TEN	11	5	39	31	8	0.0	1	1	1	0	1	4	1	0	0	0
		94	56	308	256	52	1.0	6	9	89	0	28	63	10	1	0	0

=== Playoffs ===
Year	Team	Games		Tackles					Interceptions					Fumbles			
Year	Team	GP	GS	Cmb	Solo	Ast	Sck	TFL	Int	Yds	TD	Lng	PD	FF	FR	Yds	TD
2016	KAN	1	1	1	0	1	0.0	0	0	0	0	0	0	0	0	0	0
2017	KAN	1	0	0	0	0	0.0	0	0	0	0	0	0	0	0	0	0
2020	CLE	**2**	**2**	**13**	**10**	**3**	0.0	0	0	0	0	0	**1**	0	0	0	0
		4	3	14	10	4	0.0	0	0	0	0	0	1	0	0	0	0
