= Denzel Ward =

American football player (born 1997)

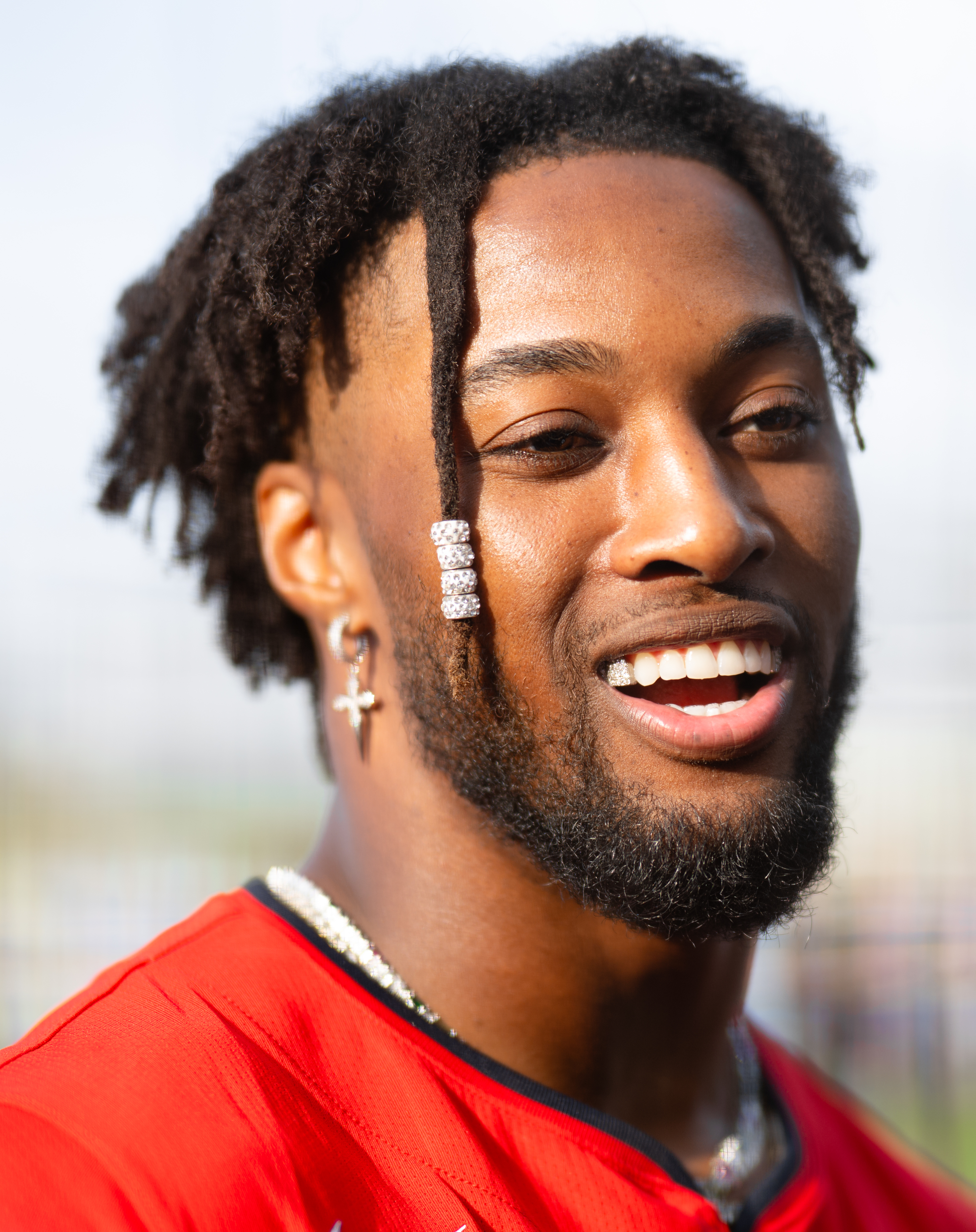
- Ward in 2025

No. 21 – Cleveland Browns
- Position: Cornerback
- Roster status: Active

Personal information
- Born: April 28, 1997 (age 29); Macedonia, Ohio, U.S.
- Listed height: 5 ft 11 in (1.80 m)
- Listed weight: 190 lb (86 kg)

Career information
- High school: Nordonia (Macedonia, Ohio)
- College: Ohio State (2015–2017)
- NFL draft: 2018: 1st round, 4th overall pick

Career history
- Cleveland Browns (2018–present)

Awards and highlights
- 5× Pro Bowl (2018, 2021, 2023–2025); PFWA All-Rookie Team (2018); Consensus All-American (2017); First-team All-Big Ten (2017)

Career NFL statistics as of Week 10, 2026
- Total tackles: 399
- Sacks: 0.5
- Forced fumbles: 6
- Fumble recoveries: 6
- Pass deflections: 116
- Interceptions: 21
- Defensive touchdowns: 4
- Stats at Pro Football Reference

Denzel Ward
- Ward, playing at David Njoku's Celebrity Softball Game in June 2025.

Cleveland Guardians
- Minority owner

Denzel Nehemiah Ward (born April 28, 1997) is an American professional football cornerback for the Cleveland Browns of the National Football League (NFL). He played college football for the Ohio State Buckeyes and was selected by the Browns fourth overall in the 2018 NFL draft.

Outside of football, he has a minority ownership stake in the Cleveland Guardians of Major League Baseball (MLB).

== Early life ==
Ward attended Nordonia High School in Macedonia, Ohio. He played cornerback and wide receiver for the Knights football team. He also played basketball and ran track. As a senior at the Division 1 region 1 finals, he ran a personal best time of 10.49 seconds in the 100 meters, placing 1st. His personal best in the 200 meters is 21.38 seconds, in which he placed third at the state championships. He committed to Ohio State University to play college football.

== College career ==
Ward attended and played college football at Ohio State under head coach Urban Meyer. As a true freshman at Ohio State in 2015, Ward played in 12 games, recording seven tackles. As a sophomore in 2016, he played in all 13 games and had 23 tackles. Ward became a starter as a junior in 2017. Entering the 2018 NFL draft, Ward decided not to play in the 2017 Cotton Bowl.

== Professional career ==
=== Pre-draft ===
On December 29, 2017, Ward released an official statement through his Twitter account announcing his decision to forgo his senior season and enter the 2018 NFL Draft. Ward also decided to skip the Cotton Bowl Classic. Ward attended the NFL Scouting Combine in Indianapolis and completed the majority of combine drills, but opted to skip the short shuttle and three-cone drill. His overall performance impressed scouts and helped solidify his position as the top cornerback prospect. Ward tied for first, among all players, in the 40-yard dash (4.32s) and his broad jump (11'4") was the best among all players, regardless of position. He also tied for second in the vertical jump (39") among his position group and tied for eighth in the bench press (16 reps) among cornerbacks who participated.

External videos
- Denzel Ward's NFL Combine Workout
- Denzel Ward's 40-yard dash

He attended pre-draft visits with multiple teams, including the Tampa Bay Buccaneers, Miami Dolphins, Chicago Bears, Buffalo Bills, Cleveland Browns, and San Francisco 49ers. At the conclusion of the pre-draft process, Ward was projected to be a top ten pick by NFL draft experts and scouts. He was ranked as the top cornerback prospect in the draft by Sports Illustrated and NFL analyst Mike Mayock and was ranked as the second best cornerback by DraftScout.com.

Pre-draft measurables
Height	Weight	Arm length	Hand span	Wingspan	40-yard dash	10-yard split	20-yard split	Vertical jump	Broad jump	Bench press
5 ft 10 7/8 in (1.80 m)	183 lb (83 kg)	31 1/4 in (0.79 m)	8 3/4 in (0.22 m)	6 ft 2 3/4 in (1.90 m)	4.32 s	1.47 s	2.48 s	39 in (0.99 m)	11 ft 4 in (3.45 m)	16 reps
All values from NFL Combine

"We saw a player who was very deserving, who played cornerback, who we thought at that time was one of the best picks on our board, and we took a guy who I think’s going to be an outstanding player."

— Hue Jackson (Browns' Head coach)

External videos
- Browns draft Denzel Ward 4th overall
- NFL Draft Profile: Denzel Ward

=== 2018 ===
The Cleveland Browns selected Ward in the first round (fourth overall) of the 2018 NFL draft. Ward was the first defensive back drafted in 2018 and became the highest selected cornerback from Ohio State since Shawn Springs, who was selected third overall in the 1997 NFL draft.

"Great kid, loves the game of football... he's got the physical features that you look for in a shutdown corner."

— John Dorsey (Browns' General Manager)

On July 24, 2018, the Cleveland Browns signed Ward to a fully guaranteed four–year, $29.16 million contract that includes an initial signing bonus of $19.29 million.

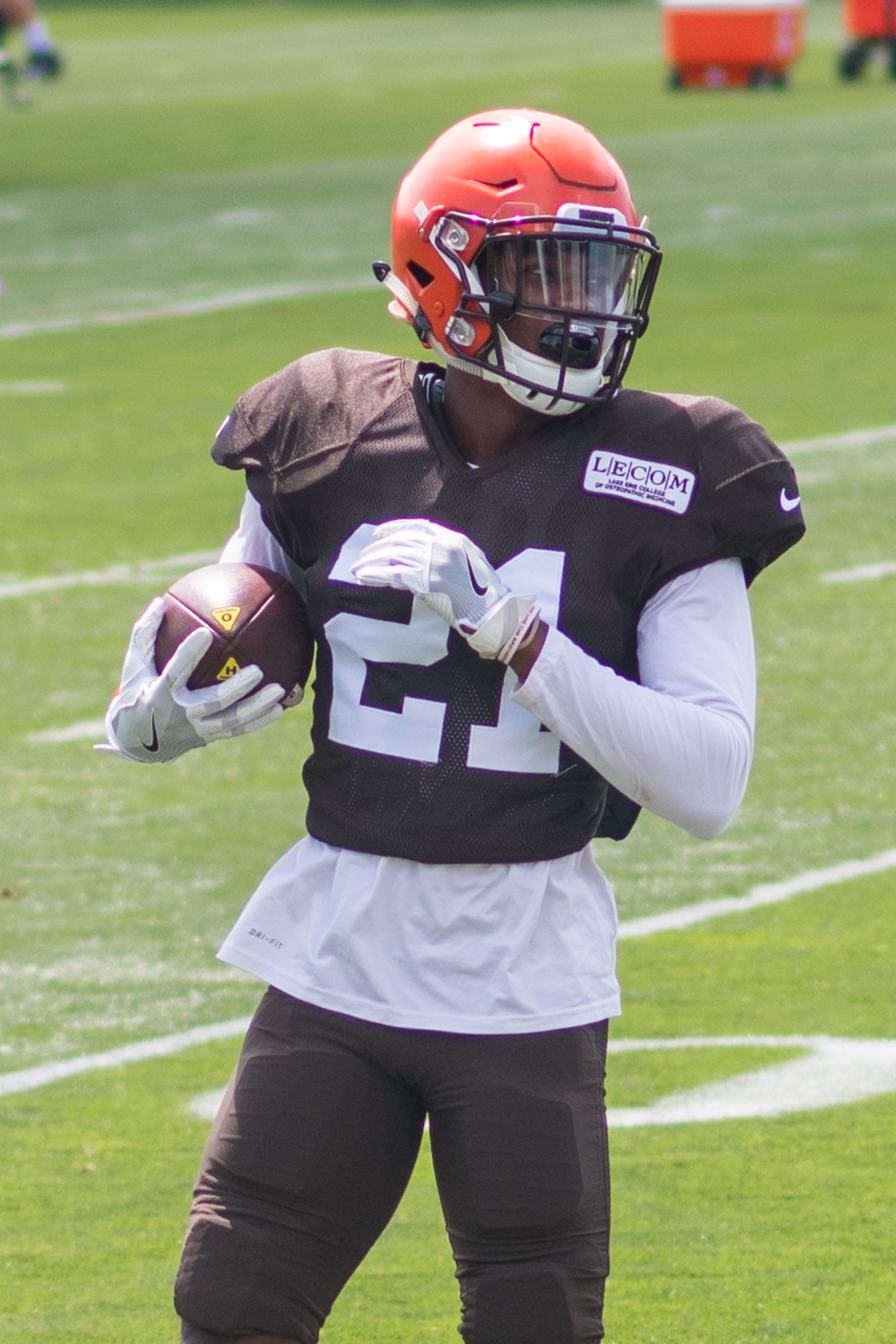
Ward in 2018

He entered training camp slated as the No. 1 starting cornerback on the depth chart after the departures of Jason McCourty and Jamar Taylor. Head coach Hue Jackson named Ward the starting cornerback to begin the regular season, alongside Terrance Mitchell.

On September 9, 2018, Ward made his professional regular season debut and earned his first career start in the Cleveland Browns' season-opener against the Pittsburgh Steelers and recorded six combined tackles (two solo), three pass deflections, and made two interceptions during their 21–21 tie. He made his first career interception off a pass by Ben Roethlisberger to wide receiver Antonio Brown in the first quarter. On October 7, 2018, Ward recorded five combined tackles (four solo), tied his season–high of three pass deflections, made one interception, and a blocked field goal in a 12–9 overtime win over the Baltimore Ravens. His performance earned him AFC Special Teams Player of the Week. In Week 8, he collected a season-high seven combined tackles (five solo) and made one pass deflection during an 18–33 loss at the Pittsburgh Steelers. He missed two consecutive games (Weeks 14–15) after suffering a concussion. He was also inactive during the Browns' Week 17 loss at the Baltimore Ravens due to his concussion. He finished his rookie season with 53 combined tackles (41 solo), three interceptions, 11 pass deflections, one forced fumble, and two fumble recoveries in 13 games, of which he started 12. He was named to the Pro Bowl and the NFL All-Rookie Team. He received an overall grade of 78.9 from Pro Football Focus, which set a career-high for him as a rookie.

=== 2019 ===
On January 12, 2019, the Cleveland Browns appointed Freddie Kitchens as their new head coach. Ward remained as the No. 1 starting cornerback under new defensive coordinator Steve Wilks and was paired with Terrance Mitchell.

In Week 2, Ward collected a season-high seven combined tackles (four solo) as the Browns won 23–3 at the New York Jets. He was sidelined for four consecutive games (Weeks 3–6) after injuring his hamstring. On December 8, 2019, he recorded five combined tackles (four solo), a season-high two pass deflections, and intercepted a pass by Andy Dalton to wide receiver Auden Tate and returned it 61–yards for his first career touchdown during a 27–19 win against the Cincinnati Bengals. He finished the 2019 NFL season with a total of 44 combined tackles (38 solo), 11 pass deflections, two interceptions, a fumble recovery, and a touchdown in 12 games and 12 starts.

=== 2020 ===
On January 13, 2020, the Cleveland Browns hired Minnesota Vikings' offensive coordinator Kevin Stefanski as their new head coach. Defensive coordinator Joe Woods retained Ward and Terrance Mitchell as the starting cornerbacks to begin the season.

On October 25, 2020, he collected a season-high six combined tackles (five solo) and made three pass deflections during a 37–34 win at the Cincinnati Bengals. In Week 4, Ward recorded four solo tackles, two pass deflections, and intercepted a pass thrown by Dak Prescott to Amari Cooper late in the fourth quarter to seal a 49–38 victory at the Dallas Cowboys. On November 22, 2020, Ward recorded three solo tackles, a season-high four pass deflections, and intercepted a pass thrown by Carson Wentz to wide receiver Alshon Jeffery to secure the 22–17 victory against the Philadelphia Eagles. On December 31, 2020, Ward was placed on the reserve/COVID-19 list by the Browns. He finished the season with 46 combined tackles (38 solo), 18 pass deflections, and two interceptions in 12 games and 12 starts. He finished the 2020 NFL season with an overall grade of 72.9 from Pro Football Focus.

The Browns finished the 2020 NFL season third in the AFC North with a 11–5 record, clinching a Wildcard berth. Ward remained inactive on the COVID-19/reserve list as the Browns defeated the Pittsburgh Steelers 48–37 in the AFC Wildcard Game. On January 13, 2021, he was activated she added to the active roster. On January 17, 2021, Ward started in his first career postseason game and recorded three solo tackles during a 17–22 loss at the Kansas City Chiefs in the Divisional Round.

=== 2021 ===
On April 23, 2021, the Cleveland Browns exercised the fifth–year option on Ward's rookie contract which guarantees a salary of $13.29 million for the 2022 season. He entered training camp as the de facto No. 1 starting cornerback. Head coach Kevin Stefanski named Ward the No. 1 starting cornerback to begin the season and paired him with rookie first-round pick Greg Newsome II.

On September 12, 2021, Ward started in the Browns' season–opener at the Kansas City Chiefs and made six combined tackles (four solo) and broke up a pass during a 29–33 loss. He was inactive for the Browns' Week 8 loss to the Pittsburgh Steelers after injuring his hamstring. On November 7, 2021, Ward recorded two solo tackles, a season-high three pass deflections, and returned an interception thrown by Joe Burrow to wide receiver Ja'Marr Chase for a 99–yard touchdown on the opening drive of the Browns' 41–16 win at the Cincinnati Bengals. On November 21, 2021, Ward deflected a pass and intercepted a pass attempt by Tim Boyle to wide receiver Josh Reynolds during a 13–10 win against the Detroit Lions. The following week, he had two solo tackles, a season–high four pass deflections, and tied his career–high of three interceptions after picking off a pass attempt from Lamar Jackson to tight end Mark Andrews during a 10-16 loss at the Baltimore Ravens. On January 8, 2022, the Cleveland Browns placed him on the COVID–19/reserve list. Due to his illness, Ward was inactive for the Browns' Week 17 win against the Cincinnati Bengals. He completed the 2021 NFL season with a total of 43 combined tackles (34 solo), ten pass deflections, three interceptions, one touchdown, and was credited with half a sack in 15 games and 15 starts. He earned an overall grade of 61.1 from Pro Football Focus in 2021. He was ranked 87th by his fellow players on the NFL Top 100 Players of 2022.

=== 2022 ===
On April 18, 2022, the Cleveland Browns signed Ward to a five–year, $100.50 million contract that includes $71.25 million guaranteed, $44.50 million guaranteed upon signing, and an initial signing bonus of $20.00 million. The extension made Ward the highest-paid cornerback in NFL history.

He returned as the No. 1 starting cornerback under defensive coordinator Joe Woods and started alongside Greg Newsome II. On October 2, 2022, Ward made two solo tackles, tied a season–high with two pass deflections, and intercepted a pass by Marcus Mariota to wide receiver Drake London during a 20–23 loss at the Atlanta Falcons. In Week 5, he collected a season–high 11 combined tackles (nine solo) and broke up a pass as the Browns lost 28–30 to the Los Angeles Chargers. He suffered a concussion and was sidelined for three consecutive games (Weeks 6–8). On December 4, 2022, he made six combined tackles (three solo), a pass deflection, and returned a fumble recovery by quarterback Kyle Allen caused by linebacker Tony Fields II for a four–yard touchdown during a 27–14 victory at the Houston Texans. He finished the 2022 NFL season with 53 combined tackles (42 solo), 15 pass deflections, three interceptions, two forced fumbles, two fumble recoveries, and one touchdown in 14 games and 14 starts. He received an overall grade of 56.8 from Pro Football Focus, which ranked 97th amongst all cornerbacks. He received a coverage grade of 60.4, ranking 80th among cornerbacks in 2022.

=== 2023 ===
On January 9, 2023, the Cleveland Browns fired defensive coordinator Joe Woods. On January 18, 2023, the Browns announced the hiring of Jim Schwartz as defensive coordinator. Head coach Kevin Stefanski retained Ward and Greg Newsome II as the starting cornerback tandem for the third consecutive season.

In Week 2, Ward racked up a season–high five solo tackles and made two pass deflections during a 22–26 loss at the Pittsburgh Steelers. On October 22, 2023, he made four solo tackles, broke up a pass, and intercepted a pass by Gardner Minshew to wide receiver Michael Pittman as the Browns won 39–38 at the Indianapolis Colts. In Week 9, he made three combined tackles (two solo), tied his season-high of two pass deflections, and intercepted a pass thrown by Clayton Tune to wide receiver Marquise Brown as the Browns routed the Arizona Cardinals 27–0. He injured his shoulder and was subsequently sidelined for three games (Weeks 12–14). Head coach Kevin Stefanski opted to rest the majority of starters, including Wars, as the Browns lost in Week 18 at the Cincinnati Bengals. He finished the season with 34 combined tackles (30 solo), 11 pass deflections, and two interceptions in 13 games and 13 starts. He received an overall grade of 69.8 from Pro Football Focus, ranking 37th among qualifying cornerbacks in 2023.

The Cleveland Browns finished the 2023 NFL season second in the AFC North with a 11–6 record to clinch a Wildcard berth. On January 13, 2024, Ward started in the AFC Wildcard Game and made two solo tackles and one pass deflection during a 14–45 loss at the Houston Texans.

=== 2024 ===
He returned as the No. 1 starting cornerback and was paired with Martin Emerson. On November 17, 2024, Ward made four combined tackles (three solo), two pass deflections, intercepted a pass by Taysom Hill to Marquez Valdes-Scantling, and recovered a fumble he caused after a reception by Taysom Hill during a 14–35 loss at the New Orleans Saints. On December 2, 2024, he recorded three combined tackles (two solo), tied his season–high of two pass deflections, and intercepted a pass thrown by Bo Nix to wide receiver Marvin Mims during a 32–41 loss at the Denver Broncos. He was inactive during a Week 18 loss at the Baltimore Ravens due to a shoulder injury. He finished the 2024 NFL season with a total of 49 combined tackles (41 solo), a career–high 19 pass deflections, two interceptions, a forced fumble, and a fumble recovery in 16 games and 16 starts. He received an overall grade of 68.4 from Pro Football Focus, ranking 61st among 223 qualified cornerbacks in 2024. He was named as a Pro Bowler for the fourth time in his career.

=== 2025 ===
In the 2025 season, Ward finished with 39 total tackles (29 solo), one interception, and nine passes defended. He earned Pro Bowl honors for the fifth time in his career.

=== 2026 ===
On July 28, 2026, Ward signed a two-year, $62.2 million contract extension with the Browns, making him the highest-paid defensive back in NFL history for the second time in his career.

== Career statistics ==
=== NFL ===
Legend
	Led the league
**Bold**	Career high

==== Regular season ====
Year	Team	Games		Tackles					Interceptions						Fumbles			
Year	Team	GP	GS	Comb	Solo	Ast	Sack	TFL	PD	Int	Yds	Avg	Lng	TD	FF	FR	Yds	TD
2018	CLE	13	12	**53**	41	**12**	0.0	**5**	11	**3**	26	8.7	26	0	**1**	**2**	**29**	0
2019	CLE	12	12	44	38	6	0.0	1	11	2	61	30.5	61	**1**	0	1	0	0
2020	CLE	12	12	46	38	8	0.0	1	18	2	0	0.0	0	0	**1**	0	0	0
2021	CLE	15	15	43	34	9	**0.5**	1	10	**3**	**103**	**34.3**	**99**	**1**	0	0	0	0
2022	CLE	14	14	**53**	**42**	11	0.0	1	15	**3**	0	0.0	0	0	0	**2**	4	**2**
2023	CLE	13	11	34	30	4	0.0	1	11	2	20	10.0	20	0	**1**	0	0	0
2024	CLE	**16**	**16**	49	41	8	0.0	1	**19**	2	0	0.0	0	0	**1**	1	0	0
2025	CLE	15	15	39	29	10	0.0	2	9	1	13	13.0	13	0	0	0	0	0
2026	CLE	10	10	38	22	16	0.0	0	12	3	0	0.0	0	2	0	0	0	0
Total		120	117	399	315	84	0.5	13	116	21	223	10.6	99	2	6	6	33	2

==== Postseason ====
Year	Team	Games		Tackles					Interceptions						Fumbles			
Year	Team	GP	GS	Comb	Solo	Ast	Sack	TFL	PD	Int	Yds	Avg	Lng	TD	FF	FR	Yds	TD
2020	CLE	1	1	**3**	**3**	0	0.0	0	—	—	—	—	—	—	0	0	0	0
2023	CLE	1	1	2	2	0	0.0	0	**1**	0	0	0.0	0	0	0	0	0	0
Career		2	2	5	5	0	0.0	0	1	0	0	0.0	0	0	0	0	0	0

=== College ===
Year	Team	GP	Tackles					Interceptions					
Year	Team	GP	Total	Solo	Ast	Sck	SFTY	PDef	Int	Yds	Avg	Lng	TDs
2015	Ohio State	11	7	5	2	0.0	0	0	0	0	0.0		0
2016	Ohio State	13	23	12	11	0.0	0	9	0	0	0.0	0	0
2017	Ohio State	13	37	30	7	0.0	0	15	2	0	0.0	0	0
Total		37	67	47	20	0.0	0	24	2	0	0.0	0	0
Source: OhioStateBuckeyes.com

=== Awards ===
- 5× Pro Bowl – (2018, 2021, 2023-2025)
- PFWA All-Rookie Team (2018)
- 2× Defensive Rookie of the Week (Week 1, 2018 and Week 5, 2018)
- Ranked No. 87 in the Top 100 Players of 2022

== Business ventures ==
In September 2026, Denzel Ward joined the ownership group of the Cleveland Guardians. Ward also runs a foundation that promotes heart health and emergency response training for cardiac arrests.
