= Dontrell Hilliard =

American football player (born 1995)

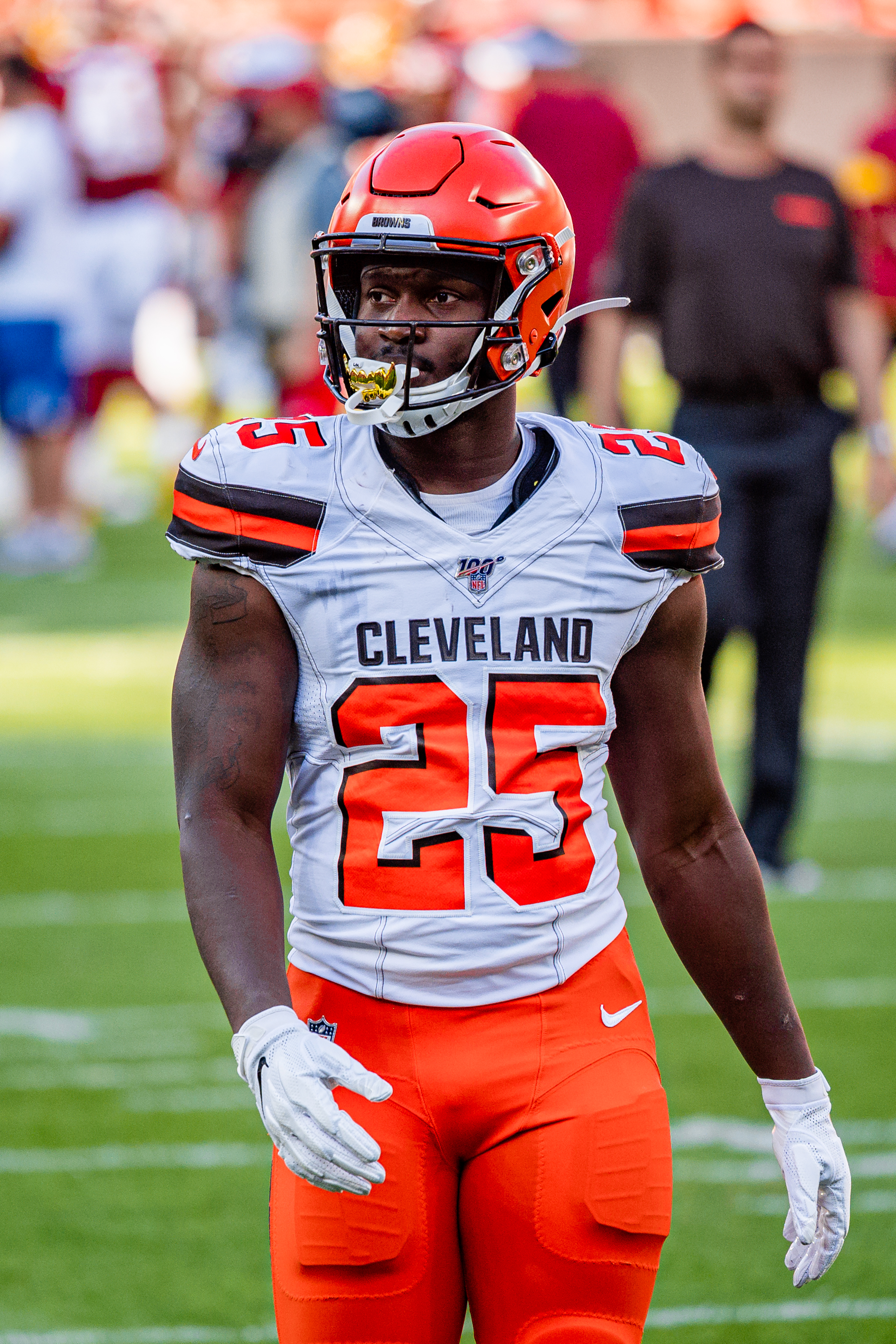
- Hilliard with the Cleveland Browns in 2019

No. 25, 22, 40
- Positions: Running back, return specialist

Personal information
- Born: February 26, 1995 (age 31); Baton Rouge, Louisiana, U.S.
- Listed height: 5 ft 11 in (1.80 m)
- Listed weight: 202 lb (92 kg)

Career information
- High school: Scotlandville Magnet (Baton Rouge)
- College: Tulane (2014–2017)
- NFL draft: 2018: undrafted

Career history
- Cleveland Browns (2018–2020); Houston Texans (2020); Tennessee Titans (2021–2022)

Awards and highlights
- Second-team All-AAC (2017)

Career NFL statistics
- Rushing yards: 592
- Rushing average: 5.9
- Receptions: 62
- Receiving yards: 463
- Return yards: 1,121
- Total touchdowns: 8
- Stats at Pro Football Reference

Dontrell Donmond Hilliard (born February 26, 1995) is an American former professional football player who was a running back and return specialist in the National Football League (NFL) with the Cleveland Browns, Houston Texans, and Tennessee Titans. He played college football for the Tulane Green Wave and signed with the Browns as an undrafted free agent in 2018.

== Early life ==
Hilliard attended and played high school football at Scotlandville Magnet High School. He received offers from Tulane and Oklahoma State before committing to the Green Wave.

== College career ==
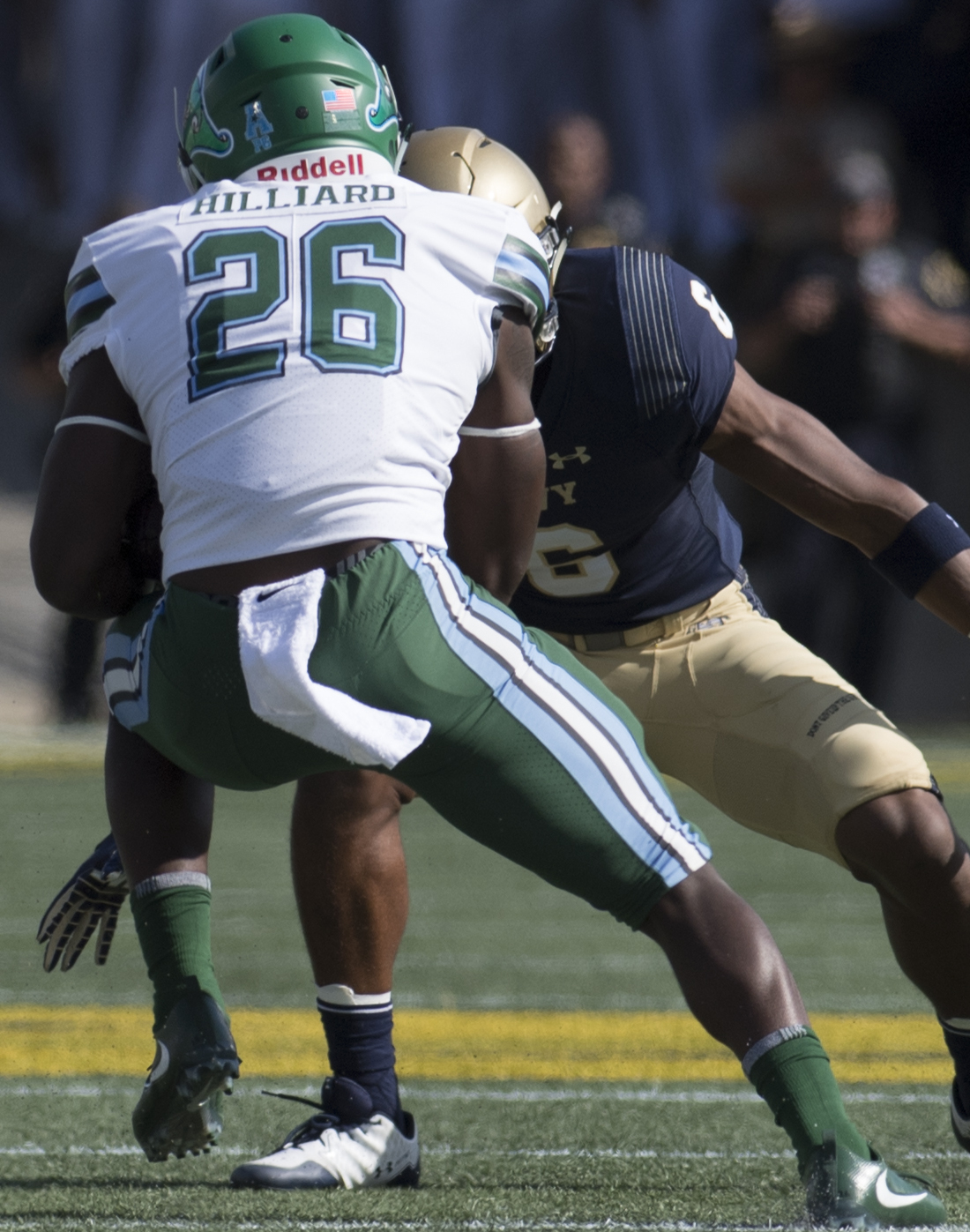
Hilliard carrying the ball for Tulane in 2017

While at Tulane, Hilliard rushed for 2,948 yards and 30 touchdowns and caught 70 passes for 740 yards and four touchdowns over the course of four seasons (47 games). As a senior, Hilliard was third in the American Athletic Conference (AAC) with 1,091 rushing yards and rushed for 12 touchdowns and was named second-team All-AAC.

== Professional career ==
=== Cleveland Browns ===
==== 2018 season ====
Hilliard signed with the Cleveland Browns as an undrafted free agent on May 4, 2018. He was signed to the Browns practice squad on September 2, 2018, after not making the 53-man roster out of training camp.

Hilliard was promoted to the Browns' active roster on October 9, 2018. He made his NFL debut on October 14 against the Los Angeles Chargers, returning one kick for 31 yards and recording a tackle on special teams.

Hilliard finished his rookie year with nine receptions for 105 yards to go along with 11 kicks for 264 yards (24.0 average) and three special teams tackles in 11 games and no starts.

==== 2019 season ====
During the season-opening 43–13 loss to the Tennessee Titans, Hilliard scored his first touchdown on a four-yard run, the first carry of his NFL career. Hilliard was placed on injured reserve on December 24, 2019.

Hilliard finished his second professional season with 13 carries for 49 yards and two touchdowns to go along with 12 receptions for 92 yards and led the team with 421 kickoff return yards and 107 punt return yards in 14 games and no starts.

==== 2020 season ====
Hilliard was tendered by the Browns for the 2020 season. He was placed on the reserve/COVID-19 list on July 26, 2020, and activated from the list nine days later. Hilliard was waived on September 5. The Browns re-signed him to their practice squad the next day. Hilliard was promoted to the active roster on September 30. He was waived by the team on December 13.

=== Houston Texans ===
On December 15, 2020, Hilliard was claimed off waivers by the Houston Texans. He signed a contract extension with the team on March 1, 2021, which was reported by Ian Rapoport of NFL Network as a one-year, $1.25 million extension. On August 16, Hilliard was waived with an injury designation by the Texans and placed on injured reserve. He was released on August 19.

=== Tennessee Titans ===
==== 2021 season ====
On October 27, 2021, Hilliard was signed to the Titans practice squad. After being elevated to the active roster, he rushed for 35 yards on seven carries, caught eight passes for 47 yards, and returned three kickoffs for 65 yards in a Week 11 22–13 loss to the Texans. After the game, Hilliard was reverted back to the practice squad. On November 23, the Titans signed Hilliard to their active roster. During a 36–13 Week 12 road loss to the New England Patriots, Hilliard had 12 carries for 131 yards and a 68-yard touchdown. Both he and fellow running back D'Onta Foreman rushed for over 100 yards in that game, the first time the Titans had two 100-yard rushers in a game since Chris Johnson and LenDale White in 2008.

Hilliard finished the 2021 season with 56 carries for 350 yards and two touchdowns to go along with 19 receptions for 87 yards and eight returns for 177 yards in eight games and five starts.

==== 2022 season ====
On March 19, 2022, Hilliard re-signed with the Titans. He was placed on injured reserve on December 17, following an in-game neck injury. He finished the 2022 season with 22 carries for 145 yards to go along with 21 receptions for 177 yards and four touchdowns, and three returns for 27 yards in 12 games and one start. Hilliard was not re-signed by the Titans following the season.

== NFL career statistics ==
=== Regular season ===
Year	Team	Games		Rushing					Receiving					Returning					Fumbles	
Year	Team	GP	GS	Att	Yds	Avg	Lng	TD	Rec	Yds	Avg	Lng	TD	Ret	Yds	Avg	Lng	TD	Fum	Lost
2018	CLE	11	0	0	0.0	0	0	0	9	105	11.7	24	0	11	264	24.0	31	0	0	0
2019	CLE	3	0	7	31	4.4	11	2	9	82	9.1	19	0	32	528	16.5	74	0	2	0
2020	CLE	5	0	5	19	3.8	10	0	1	2	1.0	2	0	2	21	10.5	13	0	0	0
2020	HOU	2	0	0	0	0.0	0	0	0	0	0.0	0	0	5	104	20.8	31	0	0	0
2021	TEN	8	5	56	350	6.3	68T	2	19	87	4.6	28	0	8	177	22.1	26	0	2	1
2022	TEN	12	1	22	145	6.6	30	0	21	177	8.4	31	4	3	27	9.0	23	0	0	0
Career		52	6	100	592	5.9	68T	4	62	463	7.5	31	4	61	1,121	18.9	74	0	4	1

=== Postseason ===
Year	Team	Games		Rushing					Receiving					Returning					Fumbles	
Year	Team	GP	GS	Att	Yds	Avg	Lng	TD	Rec	Yds	Avg	Lng	TD	Ret	Yds	Avg	Lng	TD	Fum	Lost
2021	TEN	1	0	0	0.0	0	0	0	3	13	4.3	5	0	1	26	26.0	26	0	0	0
Career		1	0	0	0.0	0	0	0	3	13	4.3	5	0	1	26	26.0	26	0	0	0
