= D. J. Montgomery =

American football player (born 1996)

No. 3 – Indianapolis Colts
- Position: Wide receiver
- Roster status: Injured reserve

Personal information
- Born: November 17, 1996 (age 29); Madison, Mississippi, U.S.
- Listed height: 6 ft 1 in (1.85 m)
- Listed weight: 201 lb (91 kg)

Career information
- High school: Madison Central
- College: Holmes CC (2015–2016); Austin Peay (2017–2018)
- NFL draft: 2019: undrafted

Career history
- Cleveland Browns (2019); New York Jets (2020–2021); Indianapolis Colts (2022)*; Houston Texans (2022)*; Michigan Panthers (2023); Indianapolis Colts (2023–present)
- * Offseason or practice squad member only

Career NFL statistics as of 2023
- Receptions: 6
- Receiving yards: 92
- Receiving touchdowns: 1
- Stats at Pro Football Reference

Dewert Montgomery Jr. (born November 17, 1996) is an American professional football wide receiver for the Indianapolis Colts of the National Football League (NFL). He played college football for the Austin Peay Governors. He has also been a member of the Cleveland Browns, New York Jets, Houston Texans, and Michigan Panthers.

== College career ==
Montgomery began his collegiate career at Holmes Community College. As a sophomore, he caught 36 passes for 991 yards and ten touchdowns and was named first-team All-State. He was rated a three-star prospect and committed to transfer to Austin Peay for his remaining eligibility.

Montgomery became a starter in his first season with the Governors and finished second with 19 receptions and 228 receiving yards with three touchdowns. As a senior, he caught 42 passes for 797 yards and ten touchdowns

== Professional career ==
Pre-draft measurables
Height	Weight	Arm length	Hand span	Wingspan	40-yard dash	10-yard split	20-yard split	20-yard shuttle	Three-cone drill	Vertical jump	Broad jump	Bench press
6 ft 1 1/2 in (1.87 m)	201 lb (91 kg)	32 1/4 in (0.82 m)	10 1/8 in (0.26 m)	6 ft 4 1/4 in (1.94 m)	4.43 s	1.52 s	2.60 s	4.36 s	6.69 s	37.5 in (0.95 m)	10 ft 7 in (3.23 m)	7 reps
All values from Pro Day

=== Cleveland Browns ===
Montgomery signed with the Cleveland Browns as an undrafted free agent on May 3, 2019. He suffered a hamstring injury during training camp and was placed on season-ending injured reserve on August 21. The Browns waived Montgomery on August 19, 2020.

=== New York Jets ===
Montgomery was claimed off waivers by the New York Jets on August 30, 2020. He was released before the start of the regular season and re-signed to the Jets' practice squad. Montgomery remained on the Jets' practice squad for the entirety of the 2020 season and signed a reserve/futures contract with the team on January 4, 2021. He was waived by New York at the end of training camp on August 31, and was re-signed to the practice squad the next day. Montgomery was elevated to the active roster on December 12, for the team's Week 14 game against the New Orleans Saints.

Montgomery signed a reserve/future contract with the Jets on January 10, 2022. He was waived by the Jets on May 10, then re-signed on May 24. Montgomery was waived again on July 26.

=== Indianapolis Colts (first stint) ===
Montgomery was signed by the Indianapolis Colts on August 3, 2022. He was waived by the Colts on August 22.

=== Houston Texans ===
On December 14, 2022, Montgomery was signed to the Houston Texans' practice squad.

=== Michigan Panthers ===
Montgomery signed with the Michigan Panthers of the United States Football League on June 1, 2023. He was released from his contract on August 18, allowing him to sign with an NFL team.

=== Indianapolis Colts (second stint) ===
On August 18, 2023, Montgomery signed with the Indianapolis Colts. He was waived by Indianapolis on August 29, and was re-signed to the team's practice squad. Montgomery was signed to the active roster on December 14.

Montgomery was released by the Colts on August 27, 2024, and was re-signed to the practice squad. He signed a reserve/future contract with Indianapolis on January 6, 2025. Montgomery was placed on injured reserve on August 13.

On August 9, 2026, Montgomery re-signed with the Colts. He was placed on season–ending injured reserve due to an abdominal injury on August 30.
