= Brandin Bryant =

American football player (born 1993)

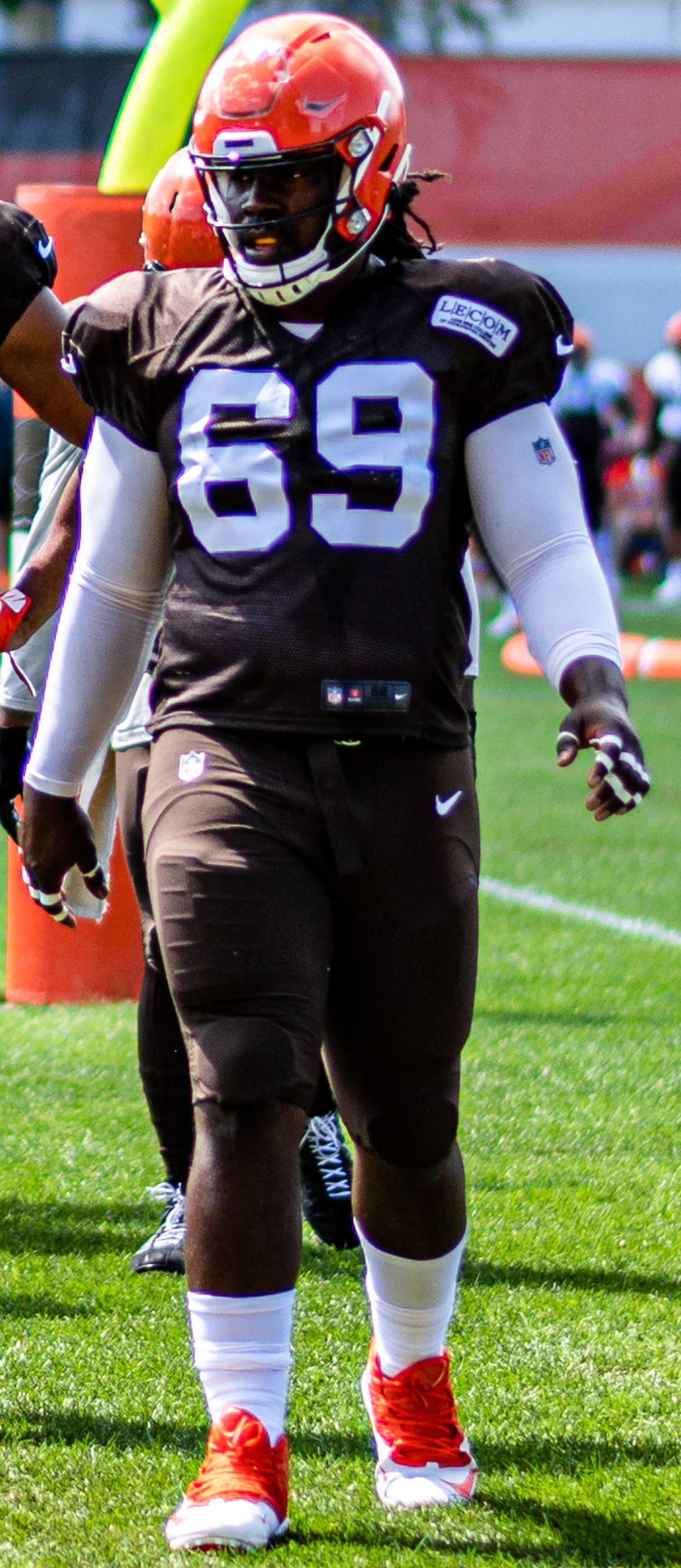
- Bryant with the Cleveland Browns in 2019

Profile
- Position: Defensive end

Personal information
- Born: September 16, 1993 (age 33); Omaha, Nebraska, U.S.
- Listed height: 6 ft 2 in (1.88 m)
- Listed weight: 305 lb (138 kg)

Career information
- High school: Omaha North
- College: Florida Atlantic
- NFL draft: 2016: undrafted

Career history
- Seattle Seahawks (2016)*; New York Jets (2016); Winnipeg Blue Bombers (2018); Montreal Alouettes (2019); Cleveland Browns (2019); Miami Dolphins (2020)*; Buffalo Bills (2020–2022); Houston Texans (2022)*; Buffalo Bills (2022); New York Giants (2023)*
- * Offseason or practice squad member only

Career NFL statistics
- Total tackles: 9
- Stats at Pro Football Reference

Brandin Bryant (born September 16, 1993) is an American children’s book author and professional football defensive end. He played college football at Florida Atlantic and was signed by the Seattle Seahawks as an undrafted free agent in 2016. Brandin published his debut children’s book “So, You Want To Be an Athlete?” in January 2024.

== College career ==
Bryant first went to college at Fort Scott Community College as a redshirt freshman. He transferred to Florida Atlantic University, where he would be a starter for the following four seasons. He majored in communication and political science. During his junior season, he returned to Nebraska, where his grandfather had played in the mid-1950s. Over his four-year collegiate career, he totaled 130 total tackles (27.0 for a loss), 13.5 sacks, 2 passes defended and a forced fumble. He earned FAU's comeback player of the year award during the 2015 season.

== Professional career ==
=== Seattle Seahawks ===
Bryant was signed by the Seattle Seahawks as an undrafted free agent on May 6, 2016. He played in all four of their preseason games, compiling 3 total tackles. On September 3, 2016, Bryant was waived by the Seahawks.

=== New York Jets ===
On October 24, 2016, Bryant was signed to the New York Jets' practice squad. He was promoted to the active roster on December 20, 2016.

On August 4, 2017, Bryant was waived/injured by the Jets and placed on injured reserve. He was waived from IR on August 9, 2017.

=== Cleveland Browns ===
Bryant signed with the Cleveland Browns on August 9, 2019. He was waived on August 31, 2019 and was signed to the practice squad the next day. The Browns elevated Bryant to their active roster on November 22, 2019. He was waived on December 21, 2019 and re-signed to the practice squad. The Browns signed Bryant to their reserve/futures list on December 30, 2019. Bryant was waived by the Browns on May 8, 2020.

=== Miami Dolphins ===
Bryant was signed by the Miami Dolphins on August 12, 2020. He was placed on the reserve/COVID-19 list by the team on August 15, 2020, and activated the next day. He was waived on September 5, 2020.

=== Buffalo Bills (first stint) ===
On September 17, 2020, Bryant was signed to the Buffalo Bills practice squad. He was elevated to the active roster on October 31 for the team's week 8 game against the New England Patriots, and reverted to the practice squad after the game. On January 26, 2021, Bryant signed a reserves/futures contract with the Bills. He was waived on August 31, 2021 and re-signed to the practice squad the next day.

After the Bills were eliminated in the Divisional Round of the 2021 playoffs, Bryant signed a reserve/future contract on January 24, 2022.

On August 30, 2022, Bryant was waived by the Bills and signed to the practice squad the next day. He was promoted to the active roster on September 24. He was released on November 1.

=== Houston Texans ===
On November 7, 2022, Bryant was signed to the Houston Texans practice squad. He was released on December 12.

=== Buffalo Bills (second stint) ===
On December 13, 2022, the Buffalo Bills signed Bryant to the 53-man roster. On December 19 he was released. On December 21, he was re-signed to the practice squad. He signed a reserve/future contract on January 23, 2023. He was released on June 1, 2023.

=== New York Giants ===
On July 24, 2023, the New York Giants signed Bryant. He was released on August 27.
