= Stephen Carlson =

American football player (born 1996)

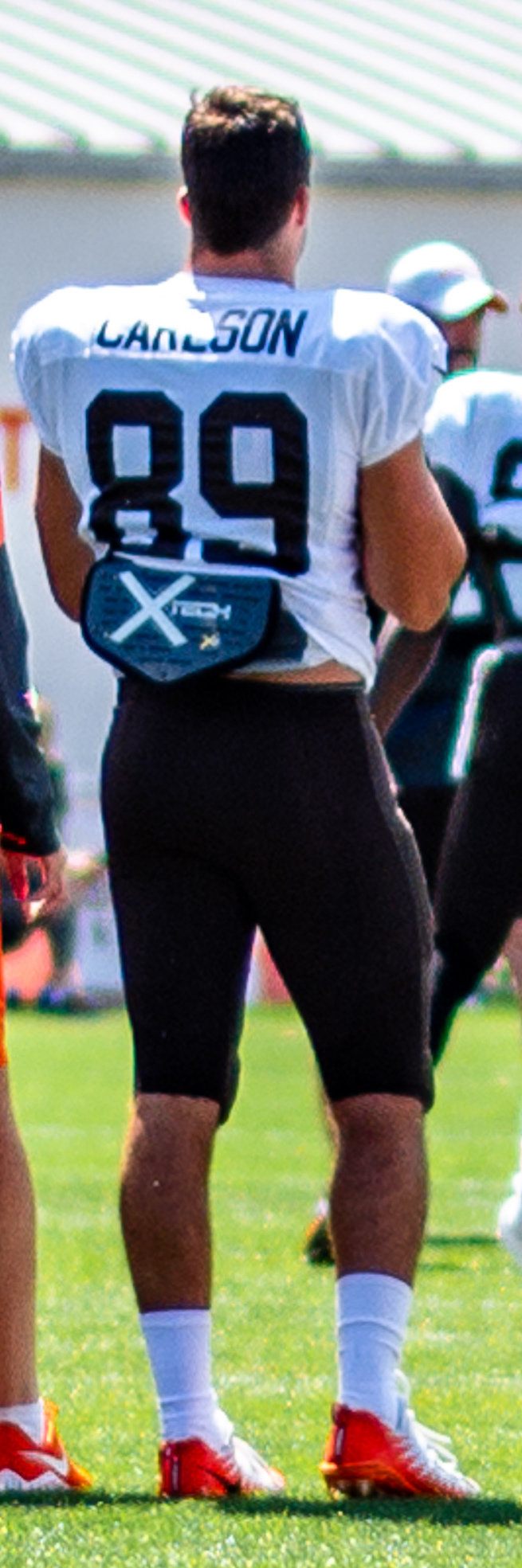
- Carlson with the Cleveland Browns in 2019

No. 88 – Chicago Bears
- Position: Tight end
- Roster status: Active

Personal information
- Born: December 12, 1996 (age 29); Jamestown, New York, U.S.
- Listed height: 6 ft 4 in (1.93 m)
- Listed weight: 248 lb (112 kg)

Career information
- High school: Jamestown
- College: Princeton (2015–2018)
- NFL draft: 2019: undrafted

Career history
- Cleveland Browns (2019–2021); Chicago Bears (2023–present)

Career NFL statistics as of 2025
- Receptions: 6
- Receiving yards: 62
- Receiving touchdowns: 1
- Stats at Pro Football Reference

Stephen Carlson (born December 12, 1996) is an American professional football tight end for the Chicago Bears of the National Football League (NFL). He played college football for the Princeton Tigers.

Carlson was born in Jamestown, New York, where he started his football career. As a Jamestown Red Raider, Carlson amassed 2,411 yards on 134 receptions with 22 touchdowns. A stalwart on defense, he recorded more than 250 tackles. Carlson's performance made him a top player in the area, and he won the Connolly Cup in 2014.

== Professional career ==
Pre-draft measurables
Height	Weight	Arm length	Hand span	Wingspan	40-yard dash	10-yard split	20-yard split	20-yard shuttle	Three-cone drill	Vertical jump	Broad jump	Bench press
6 ft 4 1/8 in (1.93 m)	240 lb (109 kg)	32 in (0.81 m)	9 3/4 in (0.25 m)	6 ft 5 in (1.96 m)	4.77 s	1.64 s	2.69 s	4.19 s	6.97 s	32.5 in (0.83 m)	10 ft 3 in (3.12 m)	18 reps
All values from Pro Day

=== Cleveland Browns ===
After going undrafted in the 2019 NFL draft, Carlson signed with the Cleveland Browns as an undrafted free agent in May 2019. He was waived during final roster cuts and subsequently re-signed to the Browns' practice squad. The Browns signed Carlson to their active roster on November 1, 2019. Carlson's first NFL catch was a touchdown reception from Baker Mayfield in a 21–7 victory over the Pittsburgh Steelers on November 14, 2019.

He scored a two-point conversion in the Browns' match against the Dallas Cowboys on October 4, 2020, when he chased down a blocked kick that the Cowboys had fumbled towards the end zone.

Carlson was given an exclusive-rights free agent tender by the Browns on March 5, 2021. He signed the one-year contract on April 14. The Browns placed Carlson on injured reserve on August 16, 2021.

=== Chicago Bears ===
On May 6, 2023, the Chicago Bears signed Carlson to a one-year deal after a rookie minicamp workout. He was waived on August 29 and re-signed to the practice squad. He signed a reserve/future contract on January 8, 2024.

Carlson was waived by the Bears on August 27, 2024, and re-signed to the practice squad. He was promoted to the active roster on September 24.

On March 13, 2025, Carlson re-signed with the Bears. He was released on August 26 as part of final roster cuts and re-signed to the practice squad the next day. He appeared in two games for the Bears in 2025.

On January 20, 2026, Carlson signed a reserve/futures contract with Chicago. On August 30, Carlson was released by the Bears as a part of final roster cuts; he was re-signed to the team's practice squad the following day. The Bears signed him to the active roster on November 4.
