= Juice (disambiguation) =

Juice is a drink made from the extraction or pressing of the natural liquid contained in fruit and vegetables.

Juice or The Juice may also refer to:

== People ==
- MC Juice (born 1978), American rapper Terry Parker
- Juice Wrld (1998–2019), American rapper Jarad Higgins
- Juice (Serbian rapper) (born Ivan Ivanović in 1981), also known as "Đus"
- Le'Veon Bell (born 1992), American football player, stage name "Juice" as a musician
- Kevin Bieksa (born 1981), Canadian hockey player
- Kristian Huselius (born 1978), Swedish hockey player
- Jussi Jokinen (born 1983), Finnish hockey player
- Oran "Juice" Jones (born 1957), American soul and R&B singer and actor
- Jarvis Landry (born 1992), American football player
- Juice Leskinen (1950–2006), Finnish singer-songwriter
- Juice Newton (born 1952), American pop music and country singer
- Andrii Pilshchykov, (1992/1993–2023), Ukrainian pilot with call sign "Juice"
- Juuse Saros (born 1995), Finnish hockey goaltender
- O. J. Simpson (1947–2024), American football player nicknamed "the Juice"
- Juice Williams (born 1987), American football player
- Juice Robinson (born 1989), ring name of American professional wrestler Joseph Robinson

=== Fictional characters ===
- Juice Ortiz, a character in the television series Sons of Anarchy

== Arts, entertainment, and media ==
=== Film ===
- Juice (1992 film), an American crime drama thriller
- Juice (2017 film), an Indian short
- Juice (2018 film), a biographical film about the Finnish singer-songwriter Juice Leskinen
- The Juice (film), an in-development American satirical film

=== Music ===
==== Groups ====
- Juice (American band), an American band from Boston College
- Juice (Australian band), an Australian underground funk metal band
- Juice (Danish group), a Danish R&B musical group
- Juice (trio), a British a cappella voice trio
- Juice (Finnish rock band), a Finnish rock band led by Juice Leskinen from 1975-1977

==== Albums ====
- Juice (The Grapes album), 1997
- Juice (Juice Newton album), 1981
- Juice (Oran "Juice" Jones album), 1986
- Juice (Medeski Scofield Martin & Wood album), 2014
- Juice (soundtrack), the soundtrack to the 1992 crime drama film, Juice
- J.U.I.C.E. (EP), by Atlanta rapper Roscoe Dash
- Juices, 2010 album by The Ferocious Few

==== Songs ====
- "Juice" (B'z song), 2000
- "Juice" (Chance the Rapper song), 2013
- "Juice" (Headless Chickens song), 1992
- "Juice" (Lizzo song), 2019
- "Juice" (Yo Gotti song), 2017
- "Juice", 2018 song by Bhad Bhabie featuring YG
- "Juice", a song by Chris Brown from his 2019 album Indigo
- "Juice", a song by Qveen Herby from her 2021 album A Woman
- "Juice", a song by Steve Vai from his 1995 EP Alien Love Secrets

=== Print media ===
- Juice (Australian magazine), defunct Australian music magazine
- Juice (German magazine), a German hip hop magazine
- Juice (skateboarding magazine), an American skateboarding, surfing and music magazine
- Juice!, a 2012 novel by Ishmael Reed
- Juice, a 2024 novel by Tim Winton

=== Television ===
- Juice, a pop music program presented by Magenta Devine
- Juice TV, a New Zealand music television channel
- Juice (TV series), a British surreal comedy series created by and starring Mawaan Rizwan
- Juice Ortiz, a fictional character in the FX television series Sons of Anarchy
- "The Juices", an episode of the TV series Pocoyo

== Science and technology ==
- Juice (aggregator), a cross-platform aggregator used to download podcasts
- Juice (JVM), a Java ME Java Virtual Machine
- JUICE (software), software for editing and analysing phytosociological data
- Jupiter Icy Moons Explorer (Juice, formerly JUICE), a spacecraft of the European Space Agency
- Pancreatic juice, in biology, a fluid produced by the pancreas

== Slang ==
- Alcoholic drink
- Anabolic steroids
- E-liquid, a liquid that produces the vapor of an electronic cigarette
- Electric current or electrical power
- Vigorish, the commission charged by bookmakers

== See also ==
- Juice=Juice, a Japanese girl group
- Guice, a surname
- Google Guice, a dependency injection framework for Java
- Joose, a flavored malt beverage
- JUCE, a free application framework used for the development of GUI applications and plug-ins
- Juicy (disambiguation)
