= Juiced =

Juiced may refer to:

- Juiced (video game), a racing video game
  - Juiced (series), the subsequent series of games
- Juiced (book), a book by Jose Canseco noted for revealing the extent of steroid use in baseball
- Juiced.GS, a magazine for Apple II users
- Juiced with O.J. Simpson, a pay-per-view television program
- Juiced ball, a baseball altered to improving scoring potential
- Juiced fish or painted fish, an artificially-colored aquarium fish

== See also ==
- Juice (disambiguation)
- Joost, a peer-to-peer video distribution system
