= Andrew Berry (American football) =

American football executive (born 1987)

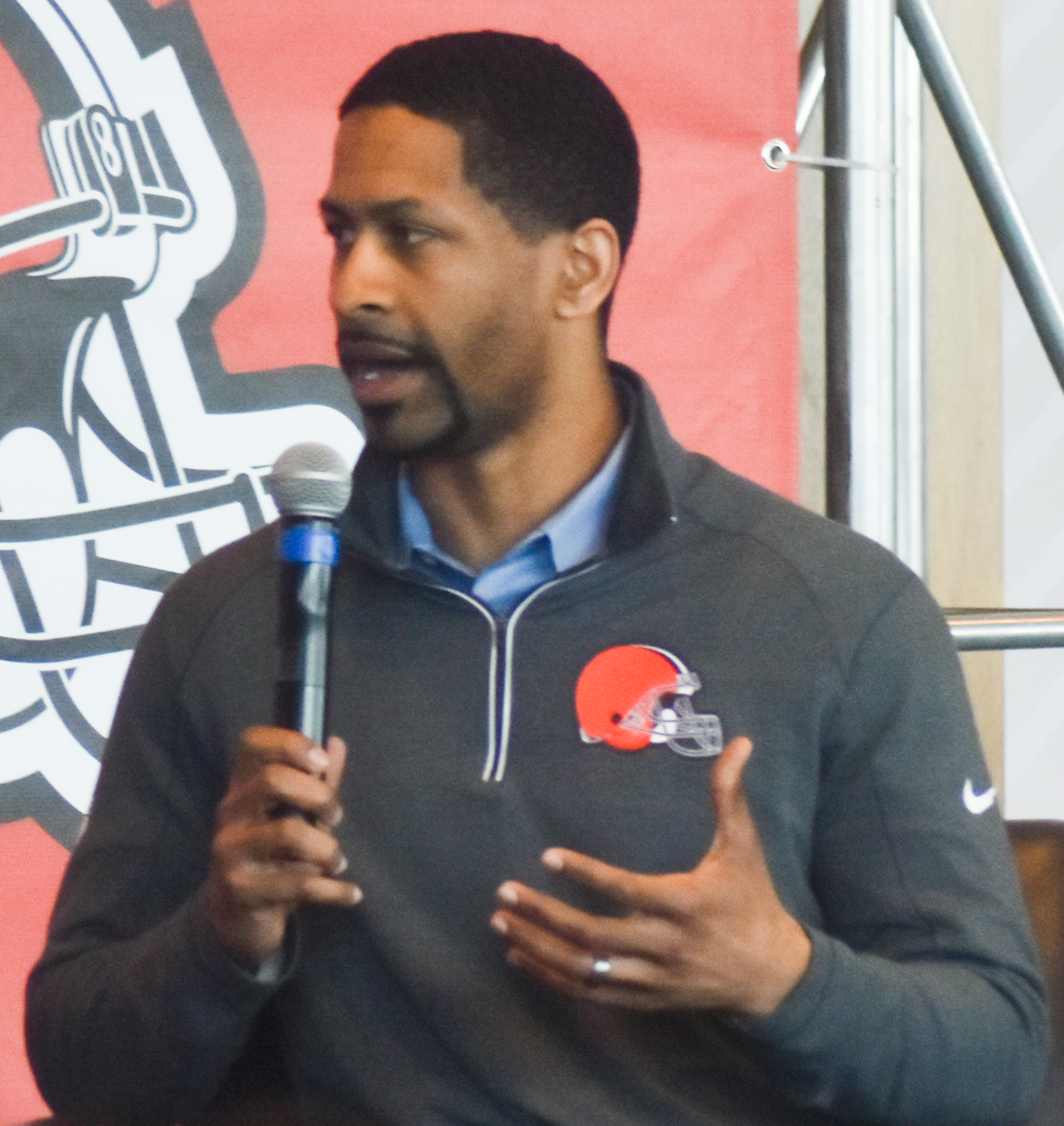
- Berry in 2016

Cleveland Browns
- Title: General manager, Executive vice president of football operations

Personal information
- Born: March 30, 1987 (age 39); Bel Air, Maryland, U.S.

Career information
- High school: Bel Air
- College: Harvard

Career history
- Indianapolis Colts (2009–2015); Scouting assistant (2009–2010); Pro scout (2011); Pro scouting coordinator (2012–2015); Cleveland Browns (2016–2018) Vice president of player personnel; Philadelphia Eagles (2019) Vice president of football operations; Cleveland Browns (2020–present) General manager & executive vice president of football operations
- Executive profile at Pro Football Reference

Andrew Jeremiah Berry Jr. (born March 30, 1987) is an American professional football executive who is the executive vice president of football operations and general manager of the Cleveland Browns of the National Football League (NFL). He previously served various other scouting roles with the Indianapolis Colts and Philadelphia Eagles.

== Early and personal life ==
At Harvard, Berry graduated with a bachelor's degree in economics and a master's degree in computer science. He also played football for the Harvard Crimson.

On April 29, 2021, Berry and his wife had their first daughter Eden Ruth Berry; they have two older sons, Zion and Kairo.

== Executive career ==
=== Indianapolis Colts ===
In 2009, Berry was hired as an assistant scout for the Indianapolis Colts. Over the next six years, he would serve as their pro scouting coordinator.

=== Cleveland Browns (first stint) ===
In 2016, Berry was hired to be the vice president of player personnel for the Cleveland Browns.

=== Philadelphia Eagles ===
In 2019, Berry was hired by the Philadelphia Eagles as their vice president of football operations following a tumultuous tenure with the Browns and the firing of Sashi Brown toward the end of the 2017 season.

=== Cleveland Browns (second stint) ===
On January 27, 2020, Berry returned to the Cleveland Browns and was hired to be their general manager and executive vice president of football operations. The move made him the youngest GM in NFL history at the time at age 32.

The largest move of Berry’s tenure as Browns GM came after the 2021 season, during which starting quarterback Baker Mayfield suffered a torn labrum. Berry and the Browns traded for Texans quarterback Deshaun Watson, despite Watson’s ongoing legal issues involving repeated sexual assault allegations. The Browns received Watson and a sixth-round pick, while the Texans received three first-round picks and three fourth-round picks. Watson was then made the highest paid quarterback in league history. The trade is considered by many commentators to be the worst trade in NFL history. Berry noted that the rest of the front office was onboard with the decision to make the trade.

On June 5, 2024, the Browns signed Berry to a contract extension. The Browns finished the 2024 season tied for the worst record in the league at 3–14.

After another disappointing 5-12 season in 2025, Andrew Berry worked with the owner of the Cleveland Browns, Jimmy Haslam, to move on from Kevin Stefanski and hire a new head coach in Todd Monken. The hire was made official January 28, 2026, marking a significant change in the direction of the Cleveland Browns organization.
