= Guice =

Guice is a surname. Notable people with the surname include:

- Daniel Guice (1924–2017), American lawyer and politician
- Daniel Guice Jr. (born 1953), American businessman and politician
- Derrius Guice (born 1997), American football player
- Jackson Guice (1961–2025), American comics artist
- Jeffrey Guice (born 1959), American politician
- John T. Guice (1923–2001), United States Air Force officer
- Les Guice (born 1954), American university president

== See also ==
- Google Guice
- Peter Guice Memorial Bridge
