= 2021 Cleveland Browns season =

73rd season in franchise history

- Browns 75th anniversary logo
- Owner: Jimmy and Dee Haslam
- General manager: Andrew Berry (EVP of Football Ops/GM)
- Head coach: Kevin Stefanski
- Home stadium: FirstEnergy Stadium

Results
- Record: 8–9
- Division place: 3rd AFC North
- Playoffs: Did not qualify
- All-Pros: G Joel Bitonio (1st team); DE Myles Garrett (1st team); G Wyatt Teller (2nd team)
- Pro Bowlers: G Joel Bitonio; RB Nick Chubb; DE Myles Garrett; G Wyatt Teller; CB Denzel Ward

Uniform
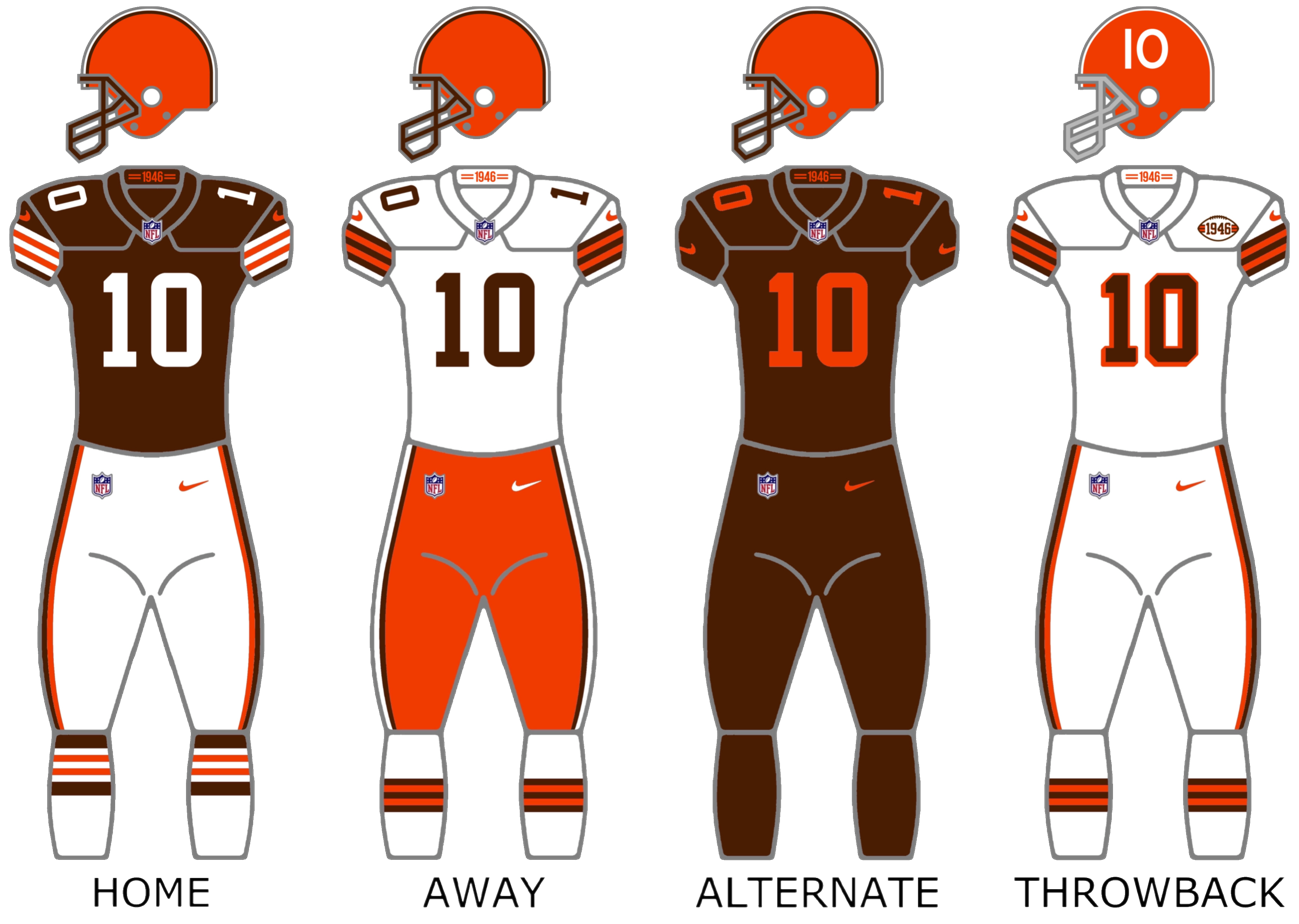

The 2021 season was the Cleveland Browns' 69th season as a member of the National Football League (NFL), their 73rd overall and their second under head coach Kevin Stefanski and general manager Andrew Berry. The Browns finished 8–9, failing to improve upon their 11–5 record from 2020. Despite starting 3–1, they would go 5–8 in their last games, eliminating them from playoff contention in the process. For the 75th anniversary of the team's founding in 1946, the Browns introduced a commemorative logo in January to use for the season.

== Offseason ==
=== Re-signings ===
Position	Player	Tag	Date
TE	Stephen Carlson	ERFA	March 5
DE	Porter Gustin	ERFA	March 5
WR	Rashard Higgins	UFA	March 17
WR	KhaDarel Hodge	RFA	March 15
OLB	Elijah Lee	UFA	March 19
WR	JoJo Natson	UFA	March 18
K	Cody Parkey	UFA	March 18
LB	Malcolm Smith	UFA	March 18

=== Players added ===
Position	Player	Tag	2020 Team	Date
DE	Jadeveon Clowney	UFA	Tennessee Titans	April 14
CB	Troy Hill	UFA	Los Angeles Rams	March 18
DT	Malik Jackson	UFA	Philadelphia Eagles	March 19
S	John Johnson	UFA	Los Angeles Rams	March 17
DT	Malik McDowell	UFA		May 3
DE	Takkarist McKinley	UFA	Las Vegas Raiders	March 17
K	Chase McLaughlin	waivers	New York Jets	May 11
OT	Greg Senat	UFA	Dallas Cowboys	March 18
DT	Damion Square	UFA	Los Angeles Chargers	May 4
LB	Anthony Walker Jr.	UFA	Indianapolis Colts	March 19

=== Players lost ===
Position	Player	Tag	2021 Team	Date
DE	Adrian Clayborn	Release		March 9
LB	Tae Davis	Release	Houston Texans	March 15
C	Anthony Fabiano	Retired		June 6
LB	B. J. Goodson	UFA		
WR	Marvin Hall	UFA	New England Patriots	June 4
CB	Kevin Johnson	UFA	Tennessee Titans	March 18
SS	Karl Joseph	UFA	Las Vegas Raiders	April 9
OT	Kendall Lamm	UFA	Tennessee Titans	March 17
CB	Terrance Mitchell	UFA	Houston Texans	March 17
DE	George Obinna	ERFA		
DT	Larry Ogunjobi	UFA	Cincinnati Bengals	March 17
G	Malcolm Pridgeon	Release		February 9
DT	Sheldon Richardson	Release	Minnesota Vikings	April 16
S	Andrew Sendejo	UFA		
WR	Taywan Taylor	UFA	Houston Texans	May 20
DT	Vincent Taylor	UFA	Houston Texans	March 17
CB	Tavierre Thomas	Release	Houston Texans	March 5
DE	Olivier Vernon	UFA		

=== Draft ===
2021 Cleveland Browns draft
Round	Selection	Player	Position	College	Notes
1	26	Greg Newsome II	CB	Northwestern	
2	52	Jeremiah Owusu-Koramoah	LB	Notre Dame	From Bears via Panthers
3	91	Anthony Schwartz	WR	Auburn	From Saints
4	110	James Hudson	OT	Cincinnati	From Eagles
4	132	Tommy Togiai	DT	Ohio State	
5	153	Tony Fields II	LB	West Virginia	From Lions
5	169	Richard LeCounte	S	Georgia	From Rams
6	211	Demetric Felton	RB	UCLA	

Pre-draft trades

- The Browns traded second- and third-round selections (59th and 89th overall) to the Carolina Panthers in exchange for second- and fourth-round selections (52nd and 113th overall).
- The Browns traded 2020 third- and seventh-round selections to the New Orleans Saints in exchange for a third-round selection (91st overall) and a 2020 third-round selection.
- The Browns traded DE Genard Avery to the Philadelphia Eagles in exchange for a fourth-round selection (110th overall).
- The Browns traded fourth- and seventh-round selections (113th and 257th overall) to the Detroit Lions in exchange for a fifth-round selection (153rd overall) and a 2022 fourth-round selection.
- The Browns traded OL Austin Corbett to the Los Angeles Rams in exchange for a fifth-round selection (169th overall).
- The Browns traded a fifth-round selection (170th overall) to the Jacksonville Jaguars in exchange for S Ronnie Harrison.
- The Browns traded 2020 fifth- and sixth-round selections to the Buffalo Bills in exchange for a seventh-round selection (257th overall) and G Wyatt Teller.
- The Browns traded their original seventh-round selection to the Denver Broncos in exchange for FB Andy Janovich.

=== Undrafted free agents ===
Player	Position	College	Signed	Cut
Tre Harbison	RB	Charlotte	May 3	
Romeo McKnight	DE	Charlotte	May 3	
Emmanuel Rugamba	CB	Miami (OH)	May 3	
Kiondre Thomas	CB	Kansas State	May 3	
Marvin Wilson	DT	Florida State	May 3	

== Staff ==
2021 Cleveland Browns staff
Front office: Owners – Jimmy Haslam, Dee Haslam, Whitney Haslam Johnson, J. W. Johnson (EVP); Chief strategy officer – Paul DePodesta; EVP/Chief Operating Officer – David Jenkins; EVP of football operations/General manager – Andrew Berry; Vice president of football administration – Chris Cooper; Vice president of football operations – Kwesi Adofo-Mensah; Vice president of player personnel – Glenn Cook; Vice president of research and strategy – Andrew Healy; Vice president of player personnel process and development – Ken Kovash; Director of football administration - Taylor Young; Director of player personnel – Dan Saganey; Assistant director of pro personnel – Adam Al-Khayyal; Director of research and strategy – Dave Giuliani; Director of scouting research – Mike Cetta; Director of football information systems - Brad DeAngelis; Senior football advisor – Ryan Grigson; Special advisor – Jim Brown; Head coaches: Head coach – Kevin Stefanski; Assistant/acting head coach and Special teams coordinator – Mike Priefer; Chief of staff – Callie Brownson; Offensive coaches: Offensive coordinator – Alex Van Pelt; Run game coordinator/running backs – Stump Mitchell; Pass game coordinator/wide receivers – Chad O'Shea; Tight ends – Drew Petzing; Offensive line – Bill Callahan; Assistant offensive line – Scott Peters; Senior offensive assistant – Kevin Rogers; Offensive assistant – T. C. McCartney; Offensive quality control – Jonathan Decoster	Defensive coaches: Defensive coordinator – Joe Woods; Defensive line – Chris Kiffin; Assistant defensive line – Jeremy Garrett; Linebackers – Jason Tarver; Defensive pass game coordinator/defensive backs – Jeff Howard; Assistant defensive backs – Brandon Lynch; Defensive run game coordinator – Ben Bloom; Defensive quality control – Stephen Bravo-Brown; Defensive Assistant - Zach Dunn; Special teams coaches: Assistant special teams – Doug Colman; Coaching assistant – Ryan Cordell; Strength and conditioning: Director of high performance – Shaun Huls; Director of strength and conditioning – Larry Jackson; Director of performance nutrition – Katy Meassick; Strength and conditioning assistant/sports science – Josh Christovich; Strength and conditioning assistant – Monty Gibson; Strength and conditioning assistant – Dale Jones; Strength and conditioning assistant – Evan Marcus

== Final roster ==
2021 Cleveland Browns roster
Quarterbacks (QB): 5 Case Keenum; 9 Nick Mullens; Running backs (RB): 24 Nick Chubb; 25 Demetric Felton; 27 Kareem Hunt; 31 Andy Janovich; 30 D'Ernest Johnson; Wide receivers (WR): 84 Ja'Marcus Bradley; 82 Rashard Higgins; 80 Jarvis Landry; 11 Donovan Peoples-Jones; 10 Anthony Schwartz; Tight ends (TE): 88 Harrison Bryant; 81 Austin Hooper; 85 David Njoku	Offensive linemen (OL): 75 Joel Bitonio G/T; 68 Michael Dunn G; 72 Hjalte Froholdt G; 62 Blake Hance T; 53 Nick Harris C; 66 James Hudson T; 77 Wyatt Teller G; 64 JC Tretter C; 71 Jedrick Wills T; Defensive linemen (DL): 90 Jadeveon Clowney DE; 92 Sheldon Day DT; 96 Jordan Elliott DT; 95 Myles Garrett DE; 94 Porter Gustin DE; 58 Malik McDowell DT; 57 Ifeadi Odenigbo DE; 93 Tommy Togiai DT	Linebackers (LB): 42 Tony Fields II OLB; 52 Elijah Lee MLB; 28 Jeremiah Owusu-Koramoah OLB; 50 Jacob Phillips OLB; 4 Anthony Walker MLB; 51 Mack Wilson OLB; Defensive backs (DB): 15 Adrian Colbert FS; 22 Grant Delpit SS; 38 A. J. Green CB; 33 Ronnie Harrison SS; 23 Troy Hill CB; 43 John Johnson FS; 39 Richard LeCounte FS; 29 Herb Miller CB; 20 Greg Newsome II CB; 36 M. J. Stewart FS/SS; 26 Greedy Williams CB; Special teams (ST): 2 Dustin Colquitt P; 47 Charley Hughlett LS; 3 Chase McLaughlin K	Practice squad: 34 Brian Allen CB; 12 Chris Blewitt K (COVID-19); 83 Lawrence Cager WR; 86 Miller Forristall TE (PS/I); 48 Nick Guggemos TE; 91 Joe Jackson DE (COVID-19); 41 John Kelly RB (PS/I); 16 Benny LeMay RB; 49 Nate Meadors FS; 35 Jovante Moffatt SS (COVID-19); 60 David Moore G; 18 Artavis Pierce RB; 43 Johnny Stanton FB; 70 Alex Taylor T; 37 Tedric Thompson SS; 59 Curtis Weaver DE; Reserve: 89 Stephen Carlson TE (IR); 78 Jack Conklin T (IR); 79 Drew Forbes G (IR); 37 Tre Harbison RB (IR); 74 Chris Hubbard T (IR); 97 Malik Jackson DT (COVID-19); 6 Baker Mayfield QB (IR); 55 Takkarist McKinley DE (IR); -- Montrel Meander MLB (IR); 56 Malcolm Smith (IR) OLB/MLB; 15 Ryan Switzer WR (IR); 44 Sione Takitaki OLB (IR); 21 Denzel Ward CB (COVID-19); 34 Dexter Williams RB (COVID-19); Rookies in italics 52 active, 14 reserve, 11 practice squad (5 exempt)

== Preseason ==
Week	Date	Opponent	Result	Record	Venue	Recap
1	August 14	at Jacksonville Jaguars	W 23–13	1–0	TIAA Bank Field	Recap
2	August 22	New York Giants	W 17–13	2–0	FirstEnergy Stadium	Recap
3	August 29	at Atlanta Falcons	W 19–10	3–0	Mercedes Benz Stadium	Recap

== Regular season ==
=== Schedule ===
The Browns' 2021 schedule was announced on May 12.

Week	Date	Opponent	Result	Record	Venue	Recap
1	September 12	at Kansas City Chiefs	**L** 29–33	0–1	Arrowhead Stadium	Recap
2	September 19	Houston Texans	**W** 31–21	1–1	FirstEnergy Stadium	Recap
3	September 26	Chicago Bears	**W** 26–6	2–1	FirstEnergy Stadium	Recap
4	October 3	at Minnesota Vikings	**W** 14–7	3–1	U.S. Bank Stadium	Recap
5	October 10	at Los Angeles Chargers	**L** 42–47	3–2	SoFi Stadium	Recap
6	October 17	Arizona Cardinals	**L** 14–37	3–3	FirstEnergy Stadium	Recap
7	October 21	Denver Broncos	**W** 17–14	4–3	FirstEnergy Stadium	Recap
8	October 31	**Pittsburgh Steelers**	**L** 10–15	4–4	FirstEnergy Stadium	Recap
9	November 7	at **Cincinnati Bengals**	**W** 41–16	5–4	Paul Brown Stadium	Recap
10	November 14	at New England Patriots	**L** 7–45	5–5	Gillette Stadium	Recap
11	November 21	Detroit Lions	**W** 13–10	6–5	FirstEnergy Stadium	Recap
12	November 28	at **Baltimore Ravens**	**L** 10–16	6–6	M&T Bank Stadium	Recap
13	Bye					
14	December 12	**Baltimore Ravens**	**W** 24–22	7–6	FirstEnergy Stadium	Recap
15	December 20	Las Vegas Raiders	**L** 14–16	7–7	FirstEnergy Stadium	Recap
16	December 25	at Green Bay Packers	**L** 22–24	7–8	Lambeau Field	Recap
17	January 3	at **Pittsburgh Steelers**	**L** 14–26	7–9	Heinz Field	Recap
18	January 9	**Cincinnati Bengals**	**W** 21–16	8–9	FirstEnergy Stadium	Recap

Note: Intra-division opponents are in bold text.

=== Game summaries ===
==== Week 1: at Kansas City Chiefs ====
Week 1: Cleveland Browns at Kansas City Chiefs – Game summary

Quarter	1	2	3	4	Total
Browns	8	14	0	7	**29**
**Chiefs**	3	7	10	13	**33**

at Arrowhead Stadium, Kansas City, Missouri

- Date: September 12
- Game time: 4:25 p.m. EDT/3:25 p.m. CDT
- Game weather: Sunny, 88 °F (31 °C)
- Game attendance: 72,973
- Referee: Bill Vinovich
- TV announcers (CBS): Jim Nantz, Tony Romo and Tracy Wolfson
- Recap, Game Book

Game information

**First quarter**

- CLE – Nick Chubb 4-yard run (Kareem Hunt run), 7:53. Browns 8–0. **Drive: 13 plays, 75 yards, 7:07.**
- KC – Harrison Butker 28-yard field goal, 1:51. Browns 8–3. **Drive: 10 plays, 71 yards, 6:02.**

**Second quarter**

- CLE – Jarvis Landry 5-yard run (Chase McLaughlin kick), 13:28. Browns 15–3. **Drive: 6 plays, 75 yards, 3:23.**
- KC – Patrick Mahomes 5-yard run (Harrison Butker kick), 6:30. Browns 15–10. **Drive: 12 plays, 75 yards, 6:58.**
- CLE – Nick Chubb 18-yard run (Chase McLaughlin kick), 2:55. Browns 22–10. **Drive: 6 plays, 81 yards, 3:35.**

**Third quarter**

- KC – Travis Kelce 11-yard pass from Patrick Mahomes (Harrison Butker kick), 7:27. Browns 22–17. **Drive: 14 plays, 75 yards, 7:33.**
- KC – Harrison Butker 43-yard field goal, 0:32. Browns 22–20. **Drive: 10 plays, 28 yards, 5:24.**

**Fourth quarter**

- CLE – Kareem Hunt 2-yard run (Chase McLaughlin kick), 10:24. Browns 29–20. **Drive: 9 plays, 75 yards, 5:08.**
- KC – Tyreek Hill 75-yard pass from Patrick Mahomes (Harrison Butker kick), 10:10. Browns 29–27. **Drive: 1 play, 75 yards, 0:14.**
- KC – Travis Kelce 8-yard pass from Patrick Mahomes (pass failed), 7:04. Chiefs 33–29. **Drive: 3 plays, 15 yards, 1:32.**

**Top passers**

- CLE – Baker Mayfield – 21/28, 321 yards, INT
- KC – Patrick Mahomes – 27/36, 337 yards, 3 TD

**Top rushers**

- CLE – Nick Chubb – 15 rushes, 83 yards, 2 TD
- KC – Clyde Edwards-Helaire – 14 rushes, 43 yards

**Top receivers**

- CLE – David Njoku – 3 receptions, 76 yards
- KC – Tyreek Hill – 11 receptions, 197 yards, TD

With the loss, the Browns started their season at 0–1. The Browns failed to win in Week 1 for the 17th straight season.

==== Week 2: vs. Houston Texans ====
Week 2: Houston Texans at Cleveland Browns – Game summary

Quarter	1	2	3	4	Total
Texans	7	7	0	7	**21**
**Browns**	7	7	10	7	**31**

at FirstEnergy Stadium, Cleveland, Ohio

- Date: September 19
- Game time: 1:00 p.m. EDT
- Game weather: Sunny, 75 °F (24 °C)
- Game attendance: 67,431
- Referee: Brad Rogers
- TV announcers (CBS): Greg Gumbel, Adam Archuleta and AJ Ross
- Recap, Game Book

Game information

**First quarter**

- CLE – Andy Janovich 1-yard run (Chase McLaughlin kick), 9:56. Browns 7–0. **Drive: 4 plays, 35 yards, 2:02.**
- HOU – Phillip Lindsay 20-yard pass from Tyrod Taylor (Joey Slye kick), 5:18. Tied 7–7. **Drive: 8 plays, 84 yards, 4:38.**

**Second quarter**

- HOU – Tyrod Taylor 15-yard run (Joey Slye kick), 7:06. Texans 14–7. **Drive: 6 plays, 47 yards, 2:38.**
- CLE – Baker Mayfield 5-yard run (Chase McLaughlin kick), 1:14. Tied 14–14. **Drive: 10 plays, 75 yards, 5:52.**

**Third quarter**

- CLE – Demetric Felton 33-yard pass from Baker Mayfield (Chase McLaughlin kick), 7:50. Browns 21–14. **Drive: 7 plays, 72 yards, 5:52.**
- CLE – Chase McLaughlin 30-yard field goal, 4:40. Browns 24–14. **Drive: 4 plays, 6 yards, 1:37.**

**Fourth quarter**

- HOU – Brandin Cooks 2-yard pass from Davis Mills (Joey Slye kick), 11:32. Browns 24–21. **Drive: 16 plays, 75 yards, 8:08.**
- CLE – Nick Chubb 26-yard run (Chase McLaughlin kick), 5:52. Browns 31–21. **Drive: 9 plays, 82 yards, 5:40.**

**Top passers**

- HOU – Tyrod Taylor – 10/11, 126 yards, TD
- CLE – Baker Mayfield – 19/21, 213 yards, TD, INT

**Top rushers**

- HOU – Mark Ingram II – 14 rushes, 41 yards
- CLE – Nick Chubb – 11 rushes, 95 yards, TD

**Top receivers**

- HOU – Brandin Cooks – 9 receptions, 78 yards, TD
- CLE – Demetric Felton – 2 receptions, 51 yards, TD

With the win, the Browns improved to 1–1.

==== Week 3: vs. Chicago Bears ====
Week 3: Chicago Bears at Cleveland Browns – Game summary

Quarter	1	2	3	4	Total
Bears	3	0	3	0	**6**
**Browns**	0	10	3	13	**26**

at FirstEnergy Stadium, Cleveland, Ohio

- Date: September 26
- Game time: 1:00 p.m. EDT
- Game weather: Sunny, 68 °F (20 °C)
- Game attendance: 67,431
- Referee: Ronald Torbert
- TV announcers (Fox): Kevin Burkhardt, Greg Olsen and Pam Oliver
- Recap, Game Book

Game information

**First quarter**

- CHI - Cairo Santos 47-yard field goal, 8:40. Bears 3–0. **Drive: 5 plays, 24 yards, 2:46.**

**Second quarter**

- CLE - Chase McLaughlin 57-yard field goal, 12:31. Tied 3–3. **Drive: 8 plays, 38 yards, 4:32.**
- CLE - Austin Hooper 13-yard pass from Baker Mayfield (Chase McLaughlin kick), 0:19. Browns 10–3. **Drive: 12 plays, 89 yards, 2:35.**

**Third quarter**

- CLE - Chase McLaughlin 41-yard field goal, 9:32. Browns 13–3. **Drive: 7 plays, 21 yards, 4:26.**
- CHI - Cairo Santos 22-yard field goal, 1:43. Browns 13–6. **Drive: 9 plays, 65 yards, 4:02.**

**Fourth quarter**

- CLE - Kareem Hunt 29-yard run (Chase McLaughlin kick), 14:46. Browns 20–6. **Drive: 6 plays, 75 yards, 1:57.**
- CLE - Chase McLaughlin 52-yard field goal, 10:40. Browns 23–6. **Drive: 6 plays, 37 yards, 3:00.**
- CLE - Chase McLaughlin 28-yard field goal, 3:43. Browns 26–6. **Drive: 10 plays, 41 yards, 5:35.**

**Top passers**

- CHI – Justin Fields – 6/20, 68 yards
- CLE – Baker Mayfield – 19/31, 246 yards, TD

**Top rushers**

- CHI – David Montgomery – 10 rushes, 34 yards
- CLE – Nick Chubb – 22 rushes, 84 yards

**Top receivers**

- CHI – Allen Robinson – 2 receptions, 27 yards
- CLE – Odell Beckham Jr. – 5 receptions, 77 yards

With the win, the Browns improved to 2–1. The Browns' defense set franchise records for fewest yards allowed (47) and fewest net passing yards allowed (1). DE Myles Garrett set a franchise record with 4.5 sacks and was named AFC Defensive Player of the Week.

==== Week 4: at Minnesota Vikings ====
Week 4: Cleveland Browns at Minnesota Vikings – Game summary

Quarter	1	2	3	4	Total
**Browns**	0	11	0	3	**14**
Vikings	7	0	0	0	**7**

at U.S. Bank Stadium, Minneapolis, Minnesota

- Date: October 3
- Game time: 1:00 p.m. EDT/12:00 p.m. CDT
- Game weather: None (indoor stadium)
- Game attendance: 66,703
- Referee: Tony Corrente
- TV announcers (CBS): Kevin Harlan, Trent Green and Melanie Collins
- Recap, Game Book

Game information

**First quarter**

- MIN – Justin Jefferson 12-yard pass from Kirk Cousins (Greg Joseph kick), 7:26. Vikings 7–0. **Drive: 14 plays, 75 yards, 7:34.**

**Second quarter**

- CLE - Kareem Hunt 1-yard run (Baker Mayfield–Andy Janovich pass), 1:16. Browns 8–7. **Drive: 18 plays, 64 yards, 8:39.**
- CLE - Chase McLaughlin 48-yard field goal, 0:02. Browns 11–7. **Drive: 8 plays, 34 yards, 0:43.**

**Third quarter**

- No scoring plays.

**Fourth quarter**

- CLE - Chase McLaughlin 53-yard field goal, 6:16. Browns 14–7. **Drive: 7 plays, 36 yards, 3:29.**

**Top passers**

- CLE – Baker Mayfield – 15/33, 155 yards
- MIN – Kirk Cousins – 20/38, 203 yards, TD, INT

**Top rushers**

- CLE – Nick Chubb – 21 rushes, 100 yards
- MIN – Dalvin Cook – 9 rushes, 34 yards

**Top receivers**

- CLE – Rashard Higgins – 4 receptions, 63 yards
- MIN – Justin Jefferson – 6 receptions, 84 yards, TD

This was Browns head coach Kevin Stefanski's first return to Minneapolis since leaving the Vikings in January 2020 to become the Browns head coach. Stefanski served as an assistant coach for the Vikings from 2006 to 2019.

With the win, the Browns improved to 3–1. This marked the Browns' sixth consecutive win over NFC opponents.

==== Week 5: at Los Angeles Chargers ====
Week 5: Cleveland Browns at Los Angeles Chargers – Game summary

Quarter	1	2	3	4	Total
Browns	3	17	7	15	**42**
**Chargers**	7	6	8	26	**47**

at SoFi Stadium, Inglewood, California

- Date: October 10
- Game time: 4:05 p.m. EDT/1:05 p.m. PDT
- Game weather: None (indoor stadium)
- Game attendance: 70,240
- Referee: Brad Allen
- TV announcers (CBS): Kevin Harlan, Trent Green and Melanie Collins
- Recap, Game Book

Game information

**First quarter**

- CLE – Chase McLaughlin 35-yard field goal, 7:39. Browns 3–0. **Drive: 10 plays, 75 yards, 6:32.**
- LAC – Donald Parham 22-yard pass from Justin Herbert (Tristan Vizcaino kick), 2:44. Chargers 7–3. **Drive: 10 plays, 85 yards, 4:55.**

**Second quarter**

- CLE – Rashard Higgins 7-yard pass from Baker Mayfield (Chase McLaughlin kick), 12:46. Browns 10–7. **Drive: 8 plays, 72 yards, 4:58.**
- LAC – Mike Williams 72-yard pass from Justin Herbert (kick failed), 11:43. Chargers 13–10. **Drive: 4 plays, 82 yards, 1:03.**
- CLE – Kareem Hunt 3-yard run (Chase McLaughlin kick), 0:54. Browns 17–13. **Drive: 11 plays, 53 yards, 6:00.**
- CLE – Chase McLaughlin 31-yard field goal, 0:00. Browns 20–13. **Drive: 4 plays, 9 yards, 0:38.**

**Third quarter**

- CLE – Nick Chubb 52-yard run (Chase McLaughlin kick), 12:18. Browns 27–13. **Drive: 5 plays, 75 yards, 2:42.**
- LAC – Justin Herbert 9-yard run (Justin Herbert–Donald Parham pass), 6:25. Browns 27–21. **Drive: 14 plays, 84 yards, 5:53.**

**Fourth quarter**

- LAC – Mike Williams 42-yard pass from Justin Herbert (Tristan Vizcaino kick), 11:22. Chargers 28–27. **Drive: 4 plays, 61 yards, 1:29.**
- CLE – David Njoku 71-yard pass from Baker Mayfield (Baker Mayfield–Austin Hooper pass), 10:40. Browns 35–28. **Drive: 2 plays, 78 yards, 0:42.**
- LAC – Austin Ekeler 4-yard run (Tristan Vizcaino kick), 7:24. Tied 35–35. **Drive: 11 plays, 75 yards, 3:16.**
- CLE – Kareem Hunt 8-yard run (Chase McLaughlin kick), 4:45. Browns 42–35. **Drive: 5 plays, 75 yards, 2:39.**
- LAC – Austin Ekeler 19-yard pass from Justin Herbert (kick failed), 3:15. Browns 42–41. **Drive: 6 plays, 75 yards, 1:30.**
- LAC – Austin Ekeler 3-yard run (run failed), 1:31. Chargers 47–42. **Drive: 5 plays, 48 yards, 0:31.**

**Top passers**

- CLE – Baker Mayfield – 23/32, 305 yards, 2 TD
- LAC – Justin Herbert – 26/43, 398 yards, 4 TD

**Top rushers**

- CLE – Nick Chubb – 21 rushes, 161 yards, TD
- LAC – Austin Ekeler – 17 rushes, 66 yards, 2 TD

**Top receivers**

- CLE – David Njoku – 7 receptions, 149 yards, TD
- LAC – Mike Williams – 8 receptions, 165 yards, 2 TD

With the loss, the Browns fell to 3–2. The Browns became the first team in NFL history to lose a game despite scoring 40+ points and having no turnovers. Such teams were previously 442–0.

==== Week 6: vs. Arizona Cardinals ====
Week 6: Arizona Cardinals at Cleveland Browns – Game summary

Quarter	1	2	3	4	Total
**Cardinals**	7	16	7	7	**37**
Browns	0	14	0	0	**14**

at FirstEnergy Stadium, Cleveland, Ohio

- Date: October 17
- Game time: 4:05 p.m. EDT
- Game weather: Cloudy, 58 °F (14 °C)
- Game attendance: 67,431
- Referee: Carl Cheffers
- TV announcers (Fox): Kevin Kugler, Mark Sanchez and Laura Okmin
- Recap, Game Book

Game information

**First quarter**

- ARI - Christian Kirk 21-yard pass from Kyler Murray (Matt Prater kick), 8:34. Cardinals 7–0. **Drive: 9 plays, 74 yards, 5:00.**

**Second quarter**

- ARI - DeAndre Hopkins 13-yard pass from Kyler Murray (Matt Prater kick), 14:49. Cardinals 14–0. **Drive: 11 plays, 78 yards, 4:41.**
- ARI - Matt Prater 36-yard field goal, 13:02. Cardinals 17–0. **Drive: 4 plays, 0 yards, 0:51.**
- ARI - Matt Prater 51-yard field goal, 9:24. Cardinals 20–0. **Drive: 4 plays, -5 yards, 2:07.**
- CLE - Donovan Peoples-Jones 11-yard pass from Baker Mayfield (Chase McLaughlin kick), 5:06. Cardinals 20–7. **Drive: 8 plays, 75 yards, 4:18.**
- ARI - Matt Prater 33-yard field goal, 0:43. Cardinals 23–7. **Drive: 12 plays, 56 yards, 4:23.**
- CLE - Donovan Peoples-Jones 57-yard pass from Baker Mayfield (Chase McLaughlin kick), 0:00. Cardinals 23–14. **Drive: 5 plays, 75 yards, 0:43.**

**Third quarter**

- ARI - DeAndre Hopkins 9-yard pass from Kyler Murray (Matt Prater kick), 2:56. Cardinals 30–14. **Drive: 8 plays, 54 yards, 3:30.**

**Fourth quarter**

- ARI - A. J. Green 14-yard pass from Kyler Murray (Matt Prater kick), 4:48. Cardinals 37–14. **Drive: 11 plays, 93 yards, 7:18.**

**Top passers**

- ARI – Kyler Murray – 20/30, 229 yards, 4 TD
- CLE – Baker Mayfield – 19/28, 234 yards, 2 TD, INT

**Top rushers**

- ARI – James Conner – 16 rushes, 71 yards
- CLE – Kareem Hunt – 14 rushes, 66 yards

**Top receivers**

- ARI – A. J. Green – 5 receptions, 79 yards, TD
- CLE – Donovan Peoples-Jones – 4 receptions, 101 yards, 2 TD

With the loss, the Browns fell to 3–3. This loss ended a 6-game winning streak over NFC opponents and marked the first time the Browns lost consecutive games under head coach Kevin Stefanski. Starting quarterback Baker Mayfield left the game after aggravating a shoulder injury he suffered earlier in the season. Mayfield was ruled out for the following game, ending his streak of 51 consecutive starts at quarterback, the second longest stretch in franchise history (trailing only Brian Sipe's 70 consecutive starts from 1978–82).

==== Week 7: vs. Denver Broncos ====
Week 7: Denver Broncos at Cleveland Browns – Game summary

Quarter	1	2	3	4	Total
Broncos	0	0	7	7	**14**
**Browns**	10	0	7	0	**17**

at FirstEnergy Stadium, Cleveland, Ohio

- Date: October 21
- Game time: 8:20 p.m. EDT
- Game weather: Cloudy, 61 °F (16 °C)
- Game attendance: 67,431
- Referee: Adrian Hill
- TV announcers (Fox/NFLN/Amazon Prime): Joe Buck, Troy Aikman, Erin Andrews and Kristina Pink
- Recap, Game Book

Game information

**First quarter**

- CLE - D'Ernest Johnson 4-yard run (Chase McLaughlin kick), 12:20. Browns 7–0. **Drive: 5 plays, 75 yards, 2:40.**
- CLE - Chase McLaughlin 52-yard field goal, 3:14. Browns 10–0. **Drive: 12 plays, 43 yards, 7:04.**

**Second quarter**

- No scoring plays.

**Third quarter**

- DEN - Melvin Gordon 8-yard pass from Teddy Bridgewater (Brandon McManus kick), 7:52. Browns 10–7. **Drive: 13 plays, 79 yards, 7:12.**
- CLE - Johnny Stanton 1-yard pass from Case Keenum (Chase McLaughlin kick), 0:30. Browns 17–7. **Drive: 13 plays, 75 yards, 7:21.**

**Fourth quarter**

- DEN - Javonte Williams 10-yard pass from Teddy Bridgewater (Brandon McManus kick), 5:23. Browns 17–14. **Drive: 17 plays, 80 yards, 6:08.**

**Top passers**

- DEN – Teddy Bridgewater – 23/33, 187 yards, 2 TD, INT
- CLE – Case Keenum – 21/33, 199 yards, TD

**Top rushers**

- DEN – Javonte Williams – 4 rushes, 20 yards
- CLE – D'Ernest Johnson – 22 rushes, 146 yards, TD

**Top receivers**

- DEN – Courtland Sutton – 5 receptions, 68 yards
- CLE – Austin Hooper – 2 receptions, 42 yards

With the win, the Browns improved to 4–3. RB D'Ernest Johnson was named the FedEx Ground Player of the week. Johnson, who was making his first career start in place of injured RBs Nick Chubb and Kareem Hunt, had 22 carries for 146 yards and a touchdown, including several key runs to run out the clock and preserve the win.

==== Week 8: vs. Pittsburgh Steelers ====
Week 8: Pittsburgh Steelers at Cleveland Browns – Game summary

Quarter	1	2	3	4	Total
**Steelers**	0	3	6	6	**15**
Browns	3	0	7	0	**10**

at FirstEnergy Stadium, Cleveland, Ohio

- Date: October 31
- Game time: 1:00 p.m. EDT
- Game weather: Sunny, 56 °F (13 °C)
- Game attendance: 67,431
- Referee: Shawn Hochuli
- TV announcers (CBS): Jim Nantz, Tony Romo and Tracy Wolfson
- Recap, Game Book

Game information

**First quarter**

- CLE – Chase McLaughlin 30-yard field goal, 8:09. Browns 3–0. **Drive: 13 plays, 63 yards, 6:51.**

**Second quarter**

- PIT – Chris Boswell 31-yard field goal, 9:18. Tied 3–3. **Drive: 10 plays, 47 yards, 5:36.**

**Third quarter**

- CLE – D'Ernest Johnson 10-yard run (Chase McLaughlin kick), 9:36. Browns 10–3. **Drive: 8 plays, 86 yards, 4:19.**
- PIT – Najee Harris 8-yard run (pass failed), 3:39. Browns 10–9. **Drive: 12 plays, 78 yards, 5:57.**

**Fourth quarter**

- PIT – Pat Freiermuth 2-yard pass from Ben Roethlisberger (pass failed), 11:04. Steelers 15–10. **Drive: 13 plays, 83 yards, 5:38.**

**Top passers**

- PIT – Ben Roethlisberger – 22/34, 266 yards, TD
- CLE – Baker Mayfield – 20/31, 225 yards

**Top rushers**

- PIT – Najee Harris – 26 rushes, 91 yards, TD
- CLE – Nick Chubb – 16 rushes, 61 yards

**Top receivers**

- PIT – Diontae Johnson – 6 receptions, 98 yards
- CLE – Jarvis Landry – 5 receptions, 65 yards

With the loss, the Browns fell to 4–4.

On November 5, the Browns announced their intentions to release WR Odell Beckham Jr.

==== Week 9: at Cincinnati Bengals ====
Week 9: Cleveland Browns at Cincinnati Bengals – Game summary

Quarter	1	2	3	4	Total
**Browns**	7	17	10	7	**41**
Bengals	7	3	0	6	**16**

at Paul Brown Stadium, Cincinnati, Ohio

- Date: November 7
- Game time: 1:00 p.m. EST
- Game weather: Partly sunny, 60 °F (16 °C)
- Game attendance: 65,451
- Referee: Scott Novak
- TV announcers (CBS): Jim Nantz, Tony Romo and Tracy Wolfson
- Recap, Game Book

Game information

**First quarter**

- CLE – Denzel Ward 99-yard interception return (Chase McLaughlin kick), 8:43. Browns 7–0.
- CIN – Joe Mixon 11-yard run (Evan McPherson kick), 4:10. Tied 7–7. **Drive: 9 plays, 75 yards, 4:33.**

**Second quarter**

- CLE – Nick Chubb 1-yard run (Chase McLaughlin kick), 14:45. Browns 14–7. **Drive: 9 plays, 75 yards, 4:25.**
- CLE – Donovan Peoples-Jones 60-yard pass from Baker Mayfield (Chase McLaughlin kick), 10:10. Browns 21–7. **Drive: 1 play, 60 yards, 0:08.**
- CLE – Chase McLaughlin 28-yard field goal, 4:10. Browns 24–7. **Drive: 6 plays, 20 yards, 3:21.**
- CIN – Evan McPherson 27-yard field goal, 0:02. Browns 24–10. **Drive: 10 plays, 68 yards, 4:08.**

**Third quarter**

- CLE – Nick Chubb 70-yard run (Chase McLaughlin kick), 8:00. Browns 31–10. **Drive: 2 plays, 70 yards, 0:14.**
- CLE – Chase McLaughlin 24-yard field goal, 5:14. Browns 34–10. **Drive: 4 plays, 2 yards, 1:20.**

**Fourth quarter**

- CIN – Joe Mixon 2-yard run (run failed), 13:51. Browns 34–16. **Drive: 7 plays, 60 yards, 2:16.**
- CLE – David Njoku 18-yard pass from Baker Mayfield (Chase McLaughlin kick), 4:27. Browns 41–16. **Drive: 6 plays, 30 yards, 2:32.**

**Top passers**

- CLE – Baker Mayfield – 14/21, 218 yards, 2 TD
- CIN – Joe Burrow – 28/40, 282 yards, 2 INT

**Top rushers**

- CLE – Nick Chubb – 14 rushes, 137 yards, 2 TD
- CIN – Joe Mixon – 13 rushes, 64 yards, 2 TD

**Top receivers**

- CLE – Donovan Peoples-Jones – 2 receptions, 86 yards, TD
- CIN – Tee Higgins – 6 receptions, 78 yards

With the win, the Browns improved to 5–4. The 25-point margin of victory was the Browns' largest since 2003. RB Nick Chubb was named FedEx Ground Player of the Week. Chubb rushed for 137 yards on 14 carries with two touchdowns.

==== Week 10: at New England Patriots ====
Week 10: Cleveland Browns at New England Patriots – Game summary

Quarter	1	2	3	4	Total
Browns	7	0	0	0	**7**
**Patriots**	7	17	7	14	**45**

at Gillette Stadium, Foxborough, Massachusetts

- Date: November 14
- Game time: 1:00 p.m. EST
- Game weather: Cloudy, 48 °F (9 °C)
- Game attendance: 65,878
- Referee: John Hussey
- TV announcers (CBS): Ian Eagle, Charles Davis and Evan Washburn
- Recap, Game Book

Game information

**First quarter**

- CLE - Austin Hooper 2-yard pass from Baker Mayfield (Chase McLaughlin kick), 10:05. Browns 7–0. **Drive: 11 plays, 84 yards, 4:55.**
- NE – Hunter Henry 3-yard pass from Mac Jones (Nick Folk kick), 0:26. Tied 7–7. **Drive: 15 plays, 83 yards, 9:39.**

**Second quarter**

- NE – Rhamondre Stevenson 5-yard run (Nick Folk kick), 14:43. Patriots 14–7. **Drive: 1 play, 5 yards, 0:05.**
- NE – Kendrick Bourne 23-yard pass from Mac Jones (Nick Folk kick), 5:40. Patriots 21–7. **Drive: 11 plays, 99 yards, 6:11.**
- NE – Nick Folk 38-yard field goal, 0:17. Patriots 24–7. **Drive: 11 plays, 47 yards, 3:31.**

**Third quarter**

- NE – Rhamondre Stevenson 5-yard run (Nick Folk kick), 5:04. Patriots 31–7. **Drive: 8 plays, 92 yards, 5:06.**

**Fourth quarter**

- NE – Hunter Henry 3-yard pass from Mac Jones (Nick Folk kick), 13:33. Patriots 38–7. **Drive: 6 plays, 47 yards, 2:59.**
- NE – Jakobi Meyers 11-yard pass from Brian Hoyer (Nick Folk kick), 4:13. Patriots 45–7. **Drive: 6 plays, 92 yards, 4:02.**

**Top passers**

- CLE – Case Keenum – 8/12, 81 yards
- NE – Mac Jones – 19/23, 198 yards, 3 TD

**Top rushers**

- CLE – D'Ernest Johnson – 19 rushes, 99 yards
- NE – Rhamondre Stevenson – 20 rushes, 100 yards, 2 TD

**Top receivers**

- CLE – D'Ernest Johnson – 7 receptions, 58 yards
- NE – Kendrick Bourne – 4 receptions, 98 yards, TD

With the loss, the Browns fell to 5–5. The 38-point margin of defeat was the Browns' largest since 2005.

==== Week 11: vs. Detroit Lions ====
Week 11: Detroit Lions at Cleveland Browns – Game summary

Quarter	1	2	3	4	Total
Lions	0	0	7	3	**10**
**Browns**	0	13	0	0	**13**

at FirstEnergy Stadium, Cleveland, Ohio

- Date: November 21
- Game time: 1:00 p.m. EST
- Game weather: Showers, 44 °F (7 °C)
- Game attendance: 67,431
- Referee: Clay Martin
- TV announcers (Fox): Gus Johnson, Aqib Talib and Megan Olivi
- Recap, GameBook

Game information

**First quarter**

- No scoring plays.

**Second quarter**

- CLE – Jarvis Landry 16-yard run (Chase McLaughlin kick), 14:52. Browns 7–0. **Drive: 8 plays, 84 yards, 4:54.**
- CLE – Nick Chubb 5-yard pass from Baker Mayfield (kick failed), 1:10. Browns 13–0. **Drive: 11 plays, 76 yards, 6:54.**

**Third quarter**

- DET – D'Andre Swift 57-yard run (Aldrick Rosas kick), 1:55. Browns 13–7. **Drive: 4 plays, 78 yards, 2:23.**

**Fourth quarter**

- DET – Aldrick Rosas 43-yard field goal, 9:07. Browns 13–10. **Drive: 4 plays, 9 yards, 1:54.**

**Top passers**

- DET – Tim Boyle – 15/23, 77 yards, 2 INT
- CLE – Baker Mayfield – 15/29, 176 yards, TD, 2 INT

**Top rushers**

- DET – D'Andre Swift – 14 rushes, 136 yards, TD
- CLE – Nick Chubb – 22 rushes, 130 yards

**Top receivers**

- DET – T. J. Hockenson – 6 receptions, 51 yards
- CLE – Austin Hooper – 4 receptions, 53 yards

With the win, the Browns improved to 6–5. This win ended a four-game losing streak to the Lions, as this was the Browns first win over the Lions since 2001.

==== Week 12: at Baltimore Ravens ====
Week 12: Cleveland Browns at Baltimore Ravens – Game summary

Quarter	1	2	3	4	Total
Browns	0	3	7	0	**10**
**Ravens**	3	3	7	3	**16**

at M&T Bank Stadium, Baltimore, Maryland

- Date: November 28
- Game time: 8:20 p.m. EST
- Game weather: Mostly sunny, 43 °F (6 °C)
- Game attendance: 60,679
- Referee: Jerome Boger
- TV announcers (NBC): Mike Tirico, Cris Collinsworth and Kathryn Tappen
- Recap, Game Book

Game information

**First quarter**

- BAL – Justin Tucker 52-yard field goal, 0:24. Ravens 3–0. **Drive: 9 plays, 41 yards, 3:38.**

**Second quarter**

- BAL – Justin Tucker 25-yard field goal, 3:53. Ravens 6–0. **Drive: 17 plays, 59 yards, 8:41.**
- CLE – Chase McLaughlin 46-yard field goal, 1:02. Ravens 6–3. **Drive: 7 plays, 25 yards, 1:27.**

**Third quarter**

- BAL – Mark Andrews 13-yard pass from Lamar Jackson (Justin Tucker kick), 9:48. Ravens 13–3. **Drive: 10 plays, 75 yards, 5:12.**
- CLE – David Njoku 20-yard pass from Baker Mayfield (Chase McLaughlin kick), 0:39. Ravens 13–10. **Drive: 5 plays, 87 yards, 2:30.**

**Fourth quarter**

- BAL – Justin Tucker 49-yard field goal, 1:10. Ravens 16–10. **Drive: 11 plays, 45 yards, 5:18.**

**Top passers**

- CLE – Baker Mayfield – 18/37, 247 yards, TD
- BAL – Lamar Jackson – 20/32, 165 yards, TD, 4 INT

**Top rushers**

- CLE – Kareem Hunt – 7 rushes, 20 yards
- BAL – Lamar Jackson – 17 rushes, 68 yards

**Top receivers**

- CLE – Jarvis Landry – 6 receptions, 111 yards
- BAL – Mark Andrews – 4 receptions, 65 yards, TD

With the loss, the Browns went into their bye week at 6–6. The Browns' sixth loss on the season means they did not improve upon their 11–5 record from 2020.

==== Week 14: vs. Baltimore Ravens ====
Week 14: Baltimore Ravens at Cleveland Browns – Game summary

Quarter	1	2	3	4	Total
Ravens	0	6	3	13	**22**
**Browns**	10	14	0	0	**24**

at FirstEnergy Stadium, Cleveland, Ohio

- Date: December 12
- Game time: 1:00 p.m. EST
- Game weather: Sunny, 47 °F (8 °C)
- Game attendance: 67,431
- Referee: Brad Rogers
- TV announcers (CBS): Kevin Harlan, Trent Green and Melanie Collins
- Recap, Game Book

Game information

**First quarter**

- CLE – Chase McLaughlin 43-yard field goal, 7:30. Browns 3–0. **Drive: 7 plays, 60 yards, 3:50.**
- CLE – Jarvis Landry 9-yard pass from Baker Mayfield (Chase McLaughlin kick), 0:38. Browns 10–0. **Drive: 8 plays, 66 yards, 4:58.**

**Second quarter**

- CLE – Austin Hooper 1-yard pass from Baker Mayfield (Chase McLaughlin kick), 8:15. Browns 17–0. **Drive: 10 plays, 77 yards, 6:05.**
- BAL – Justin Tucker 50-yard field goal, 3:30. Browns 17–3. **Drive: 4 plays, 7 yards, 1:54.**
- CLE – Myles Garrett 15-yard fumble return (Chase McLaughlin kick), 0:49. Browns 24–3.
- BAL – Justin Tucker 42-yard field goal, 0:02. Browns 24–6. **Drive: 7 plays, 53 yards, 0:47.**

**Third quarter**

- BAL – Justin Tucker 55-yard field goal, 2:05. Browns 24–9. **Drive: 9 plays, 46 yards, 4:40.**

**Fourth quarter**

- BAL – Latavius Murray 1-yard run (pass failed), 8:56. Browns 24–15. **Drive: 7 plays, 69 yards, 2:34.**
- BAL – Mark Andrews 8-yard pass from Tyler Huntley (Justin Tucker kick), 1:17. Browns 24–22. **Drive: 14 plays, 90 yards, 4:09.**

**Top passers**

- BAL – Tyler Huntley – 27/38, 270 yards, TD
- CLE – Baker Mayfield – 22/32, 190 yards, 2 TD, INT

**Top rushers**

- BAL – Devonta Freeman – 13 rushes, 64 yards
- CLE – Nick Chubb – 17 rushes, 59 yards

**Top receivers**

- BAL – Mark Andrews – 11 receptions, 115 yards, TD
- CLE – Donovan Peoples-Jones – 5 receptions, 90 yards

With the win, the Browns improved to 7–6. During the game, Myles Garrett set the franchise record for most sacks in a season, with 15.

==== Week 15: vs. Las Vegas Raiders ====
Week 15: Las Vegas Raiders at Cleveland Browns – Game summary

Quarter	1	2	3	4	Total
**Raiders**	7	3	0	6	**16**
Browns	0	0	7	7	**14**

at FirstEnergy Stadium, Cleveland, Ohio

- Date: December 20
- Game time: 5:00 p.m. EST
- Game weather: Clear, 43 °F (6 °C)
- Game attendance: 67,431
- Referee: Craig Wrolstad
- TV announcers (NFLN): Joe Davis, Kurt Warner, Melissa Stark and Steve Wyche
- Recap, Game Book

Game information

**First quarter**

- LV – Bryan Edwards 5-yard pass from Derek Carr (Daniel Carlson kick), 3:41. Raiders 7–0. **Drive: 11 plays, 58 yards, 7:12.**

**Second quarter**

- LV – Daniel Carlson 24-yard field goal, 0:56. Raiders 10–0. **Drive: 13 plays, 56 yards, 5:18.**

**Third quarter**

- CLE – Nick Chubb 4-yard run (Chase McLaughlin kick), 4:33. Raiders 10–7. **Drive: 6 plays, 47 yards, 2:40.**

**Fourth quarter**

- LV – Daniel Carlson 40-yard field goal, 14:46. Raiders 13–7. **Drive: 10 plays, 52 yards, 4:47.**
- CLE – Harrison Bryant 6-yard pass from Nick Mullens (Chase McLaughlin kick), 3:45. Browns 14–13. **Drive: 14 plays, 80 yards, 8:22.**
- LV – Daniel Carlson 48-yard field goal, 0:00. Raiders 16–14. **Drive: 8 plays, 41 yards, 1:50.**

**Top passers**

- LV – Derek Carr – 25/38, 236 yards, TD, INT
- CLE – Nick Mullens – 20/30, 147 yards, TD

**Top rushers**

- LV – Josh Jacobs – 15 rushes, 52 yards
- CLE – Nick Chubb – 23 rushes, 91 yards, TD

**Top receivers**

- LV – Zay Jones – 6 receptions, 67 yards
- CLE – Donovan Peoples-Jones – 4 receptions, 48 yards

After 25 Browns players and three coaches, including head coach Kevin Stefanski, tested positive for COVID-19 in the week leading up to the game, the game was postponed from its original date of December 18 to December 20. During this time, three players were able to test negative and be activated, but the majority of the infected players were ruled out. With starting QB Baker Mayfield and backup QB Case Keenum sidelined with the virus, third-string QB Nick Mullens made his first start with the Browns. Special teams coach Mike Priefer served as acting head coach for the game.

With the loss, the Browns fell to 7–7.

==== Week 16: at Green Bay Packers ====
Week 16: Cleveland Browns at Green Bay Packers – Game summary

Quarter	1	2	3	4	Total
Browns	6	6	3	7	**22**
**Packers**	7	14	3	0	**24**

at Lambeau Field, Green Bay, Wisconsin

- Date: December 25
- Game time: 4:30 p.m. EST/3:30 p.m. CST
- Game weather: Cloudy, 35 °F (2 °C)
- Game attendance: 77,901
- Referee: Alex Kemp
- TV announcers (Fox/NFLN/Prime Video): Joe Buck, Troy Aikman, Erin Andrews and Tom Rinaldi
- Recap, Game Book

Game information

**First quarter**

- CLE – Nick Chubb 1-yard run (kick failed), 12:21. Browns 6–0. **Drive: 5 plays, 75 yards, 2:39.**
- GB – Allen Lazard 11-yard pass from Aaron Rodgers (Mason Crosby kick), 5:13. Packers 7–6. **Drive: 5 plays, 53 yards, 3:24.**

**Second quarter**

- GB – Davante Adams 9-yard pass from Aaron Rodgers (Mason Crosby kick), 10:47. Packers 14–6. **Drive: 10 plays, 78 yards, 4:48.**
- CLE – Harrison Bryant 1-yard pass from Baker Mayfield (pass failed), 7:03. Packers 14–12. **Drive: 6 plays, 70 yards, 3:44.**
- GB – Davante Adams 1-yard pass from Aaron Rodgers (Mason Crosby kick), 0:12. Packers 21–12. **Drive: 9 plays, 49 yards, 1:39.**

**Third quarter**

- GB – Mason Crosby 32-yard field goal, 9:12. Packers 24–12. **Drive: 11 plays, 76 yards, 5:48.**
- CLE – Chris Naggar 37-yard field goal, 1:07. Packers 24–15. **Drive: 14 plays, 66 yards, 8:05.**

**Fourth quarter**

- CLE – Anthony Schwartz 5-yard pass from Baker Mayfield (Chris Naggar kick), 4:31. Packers 24–22. **Drive: 8 plays, 76 yards, 2:10.**

**Top passers**

- CLE – Baker Mayfield – 21/36, 222 yards, 2 TD, 4 INT
- GB – Aaron Rodgers – 24/34, 202 yards, 3 TD

**Top rushers**

- CLE – Nick Chubb – 17 rushes, 126 yards, TD
- GB – Aaron Jones – 12 rushes, 66 yards

**Top receivers**

- CLE – Rashard Higgins – 5 receptions, 58 yards
- GB – Davante Adams – 10 receptions, 114 yards, 2 TD

This game marked the first time in franchise history that the Browns played on Christmas Day.

With the loss, the Browns fell to 7–8, and had 6 one-score game losses, the most in the NFL

==== Week 17: at Pittsburgh Steelers ====
Week 17: Cleveland Browns at Pittsburgh Steelers – Game summary

Quarter	1	2	3	4	Total
Browns	0	0	7	7	**14**
**Steelers**	0	10	3	13	**26**

at Heinz Field, Pittsburgh, Pennsylvania

- Date: January 3
- Game time: 8:15 p.m. EST
- Game weather: Cloudy, 27 °F (−3 °C)
- Game attendance: 63,624
- Referee: Brad Allen
- TV announcers (ESPN): Steve Levy, Brian Griese, Louis Riddick and Lisa Salters
- Recap, Game Book

Game information

**First quarter**

- No scoring plays.

**Second quarter**

- PIT – Diontae Johnson 5-yard pass from Ben Roethlisberger (Chris Boswell kick), 10:39. Steelers 7–0. **Drive: 10 plays, 66 yards, 4:14.**
- PIT – Chris Boswell 22-yard field goal, 3:02. Steelers 10–0. **Drive: 11 plays, 39 yards, 4:01.**

**Third quarter**

- PIT – Chris Boswell 30-yard field goal, 8:20. Steelers 13–0. **Drive: 11 plays, 66 yards, 4:16.**
- CLE – David Njoku 3-yard pass from Baker Mayfield (Chase McLaughlin kick), 0:56. Steelers 13–7. **Drive: 4 plays, 48 yards, 2:02.**

**Fourth quarter**

- PIT – Chris Boswell 50-yard field goal, 9:46. Steelers 16–7. **Drive: 8 plays, 25 yards, 3:50.**
- PIT – Chris Boswell 48-yard field goal, 5:48. Steelers 19–7. **Drive: 4 plays, 7 yards, 1:35.**
- CLE – Harrison Bryant 1-yard pass from Baker Mayfield (Chase McLaughlin kick), 1:10. Steelers 19–14. **Drive: 17 plays, 76 yards, 4:38.**
- PIT – Najee Harris 37-yard run (Chris Boswell kick), 0:51. Steelers 26–14. **Drive: 3 plays, 45 yards, 0:19.**

**Top passers**

- CLE – Baker Mayfield – 16/38, 185 yards, 2 TD, 2 INT
- PIT – Ben Roethlisberger – 24/46, 123 yards, TD, INT

**Top rushers**

- CLE – Nick Chubb – 12 rushes, 58 yards
- PIT – Najee Harris – 28 rushes, 188 yards, TD

**Top receivers**

- CLE – Donovan Peoples-Jones – 3 receptions, 76 yards
- PIT – Ray-Ray McCloud – 4 receptions, 35 yards

On January 2, Cincinnati defeated Kansas City to clinch the AFC North title. This marks the Browns’ 29th consecutive season without winning a division title. With the Los Angeles Chargers’ win over Denver later that day, the Browns were eliminated from playoff contention.

With their 18th straight regular season loss in Pittsburgh, the Browns fell to 7–9. They finished 2–6 in away games.

==== Week 18: vs. Cincinnati Bengals ====
Week 18: Cincinnati Bengals at Cleveland Browns – Game summary

Quarter	1	2	3	4	Total
Bengals	0	7	3	6	**16**
**Browns**	7	7	0	7	**21**

at FirstEnergy Stadium, Cleveland, Ohio

- Date: January 9
- Game time: 1:00 p.m. EST
- Game weather: Rain, 37 °F (3 °C)
- Game attendance: 67,431
- Referee: Bill Vinovich
- TV announcers (Fox): Kenny Albert, Jonathan Vilma and Lindsay Czarniak
- Recap, Game Book

Game information

**First quarter**

- CLE – Jarvis Landry 26-yard pass from Case Keenum (Chase McLaughlin kick), 0:56. Browns 7–0. **Drive: 6 plays, 79 yards, 3:18.**

**Second quarter**

- CLE – D'Ernest Johnson 4-yard run (Chase McLaughlin kick), 11:22. Browns 14–0. **Drive: 6 plays, 58 yards, 2:42.**
- CIN – Trayvon Henderson 29-yard fumble return (Elliott Fry kick), 3:28. Browns 14–7.

**Third quarter**

- CIN – Elliott Fry 36-yard field goal, 5:01. Browns 14–10. **Drive: 14 plays, 52 yards, 8:36.**

**Fourth quarter**

- CLE – Demetric Felton 10-yard pass from Case Keenum (Chase McLaughlin kick), 7:14. Browns 21–10. **Drive: 10 plays, 46 yards, 6:00.**
- CIN – Chris Evans 4-yard pass from Brandon Allen (pass failed), 2:26. Browns 21–16. **Drive: 13 plays, 75 yards, 4:48.**

**Top passers**

- CIN – Brandon Allen – 15/29, 136 yards, TD
- CLE – Case Keenum – 17/24, 176 yards, 2 TD, INT

**Top rushers**

- CIN – Trayveon Williams – 9 rushes, 38 yards
- CLE – D'Ernest Johnson – 25 rushes, 123 yards, TD

**Top receivers**

- CIN – Trent Taylor – 2 reception, 41 yards
- CLE – Jarvis Landry – 6 receptions, 75 yards, TD

With the win, the Browns finished the season 8–9. They finished 6–3 in home games. The Browns swept the Bengals in back-to-back seasons for the first time since 1994 and 1995.

=== Standings ===
==== Division ====
AFC North
	W	L	T	PCT	DIV	CONF	PF	PA	STK
^{(4)} Cincinnati Bengals	10	7	0	.588	4–2	8–4	460	376	L1
^{(7)} Pittsburgh Steelers	9	7	1	.559	4–2	7–5	343	398	W2
Cleveland Browns	8	9	0	.471	3–3	5–7	349	371	W1
Baltimore Ravens	8	9	0	.471	1–5	5–7	387	392	L6

==== Conference ====
AFC
#	Team	Division	W	L	T	PCT	DIV	CONF	SOS	SOV	STK
**Division winners**
1 (Note: Tennessee finished ahead of Kansas City based on head-to-head victory, claiming the No. 1 seed.)	Tennessee Titans	South	12	5	0	.706	5–1	8–4	.472	.480	W3
2	Kansas City Chiefs	West	12	5	0	.706	5–1	7–5	.538	.517	W1
3	Buffalo Bills	East	11	6	0	.647	5–1	7–5	.472	.428	W4
4	Cincinnati Bengals	North	10	7	0	.588	4–2	8–4	.472	.462	L1
**Wild cards**
5 (Note: Las Vegas claimed the No. 5 seed over New England based on win percentage in common games (5–1 vs. 2–4 against: Miami, Dallas, LA Chargers, Cleveland, and Indianapolis).)	Las Vegas Raiders	West	10	7	0	.588	3–3	8–4	.510	.515	W4
6	New England Patriots	East	10	7	0	.588	3–3	8–4	.481	.394	L1
7	Pittsburgh Steelers	North	9	7	1	.559	4–2	7–5	.521	.490	W2
**Did not qualify for the postseason**
8 (Note: Indianapolis finished ahead of Miami and Los Angeles based on conference record (7–5 vs. 6–6).)	Indianapolis Colts	South	9	8	0	.529	3–3	7–5	.495	.431	L2
9 (Note: Miami finished ahead of LA Chargers based on win percentage in common games (5–1 vs. 2–4 against: New England, Las Vegas, Houston, Baltimore, and NY Giants).)	Miami Dolphins	East	9	8	0	.529	4–2	6–6	.464	.379	W1
10	Los Angeles Chargers	West	9	8	0	.529	3–3	6–6	.510	.500	L1
11 (Note: Cleveland finished ahead of Baltimore based on division record (3–3 vs. 1–5).)	Cleveland Browns	North	8	9	0	.471	3–3	5–7	.514	.415	W1
12	Baltimore Ravens	North	8	9	0	.471	1–5	5–7	.531	.460	L6
13	Denver Broncos	West	7	10	0	.412	1–5	3–9	.484	.357	L4
14 (Note: NY Jets finished ahead of Houston based on head-to-head victory.)	New York Jets	East	4	13	0	.235	0–6	4–8	.512	.426	L2
15	Houston Texans	South	4	13	0	.235	3–3	4–8	.498	.397	L2
16	Jacksonville Jaguars	South	3	14	0	.176	1–5	3–9	.512	.569	W1
**Tiebreakers** (Note: When breaking ties for three or more teams under the NFL's rules, they are first broken within divisions, then comparing only the highest-ranked remaining team from each division.)

=== Team leaders ===
==== Regular season ====
Category	Player(s)	Value
Passing yards	Baker Mayfield	3,010
Passing touchdowns	Baker Mayfield	17
Rushing yards	Nick Chubb	1,259
Rushing touchdowns	Nick Chubb	8
Receptions	Jarvis Landry	52
Receiving yards	Donovan Peoples-Jones	597
Receiving touchdowns	David Njoku	4
Points	Chase McLaughlin	81
Kickoff return yards	Anthony Schwartz	322
Punt return yards	Demetric Felton	227
Tackles	Anthony Walker Jr.	113
Sacks	Myles Garrett	16.0
Forced fumbles	2 players tied	2
Interceptions	2 players tied	3
Pass deflections	2 players tied	10

== Awards ==
The following Browns were awarded for their performances during the season:

=== AFC Defensive Player of the Week/Month ===
W/M	Player	Line
3	DE Myles Garrett	7 TKL, 4 TFL, 4.5 sacks

=== 2022 Pro Bowl ===
On December 20, it was announced that G Joel Bitonio, RB Nick Chubb, DE Myles Garrett, G Wyatt Teller, and CB Denzel Ward were named to the AFC Pro Bowl roster, with Bitonio and Garrett named as starters. This marks the fourth Pro Bowl selection for Bitonio, the third for Chubb and Garrett, the second for Ward, and the first for Teller.
