= Demetric Felton =

American football player (born 1998)

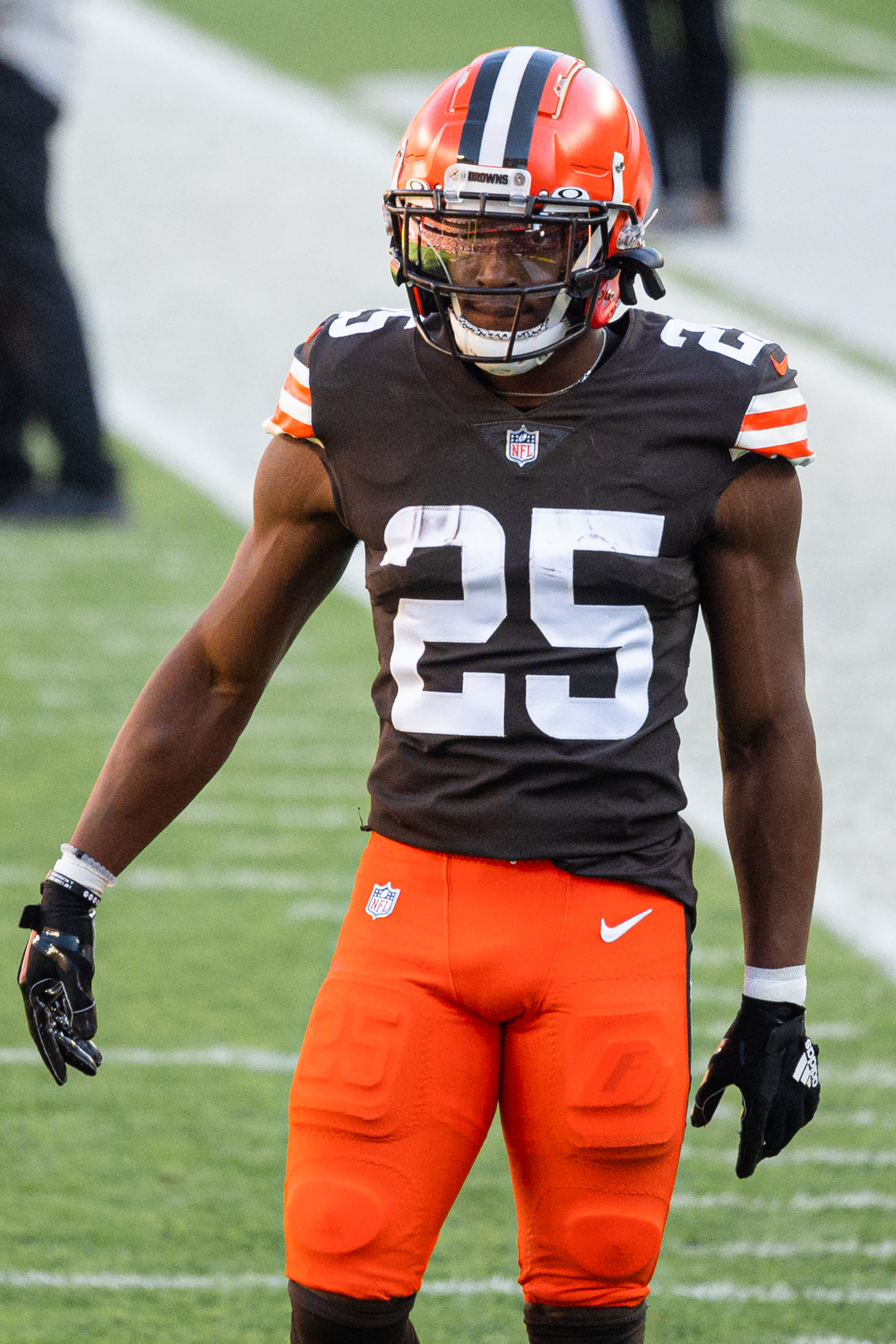
- Felton with the Cleveland Browns in 2021

Cleveland Browns
- Title: Coach

Personal information
- Born: July 16, 1998 (age 28); Memphis, Tennessee, U.S.
- Listed height: 5 ft 9 in (1.75 m)
- Listed weight: 190 lb (86 kg)

Career information
- Positions: Running back, wide receiver
- High school: Great Oak (Temecula, California)
- College: UCLA (2017–2020)
- NFL draft: 2021: 6th round, 211th overall pick

Career history

Playing
- Cleveland Browns (2021–2022); Cincinnati Bengals (2023)*; Chicago Bears (2024)*; Indianapolis Colts (2024)*; Chicago Bears (2024)*; Birmingham Stallions (2025)*; Washington Commanders (2025)*; BC Lions (2026)*
- * Offseason or practice squad member only

Coaching
- Cleveland Browns (2026–present) Offensive skill developmental analyst

Awards and highlights
- PFWA All-Rookie Team (2021); Second-team All-Pac-12 (2020)

Career NFL statistics
- Rushing yards: 20
- Rushing average: 2.5
- Receptions: 20
- Receiving yards: 189
- Receiving touchdowns: 2
- Return yards: 452
- Stats at Pro Football Reference

Demetric Felton Jr. (born July 16, 1998) is an American former professional football player who was a running back and wide receiver in the National Football League (NFL). He played college football for the UCLA Bruins and was selected by the Cleveland Browns in the sixth round of the 2021 NFL draft. He currently serves as an offensive skill developmental analyst for the Browns.

== Early life ==
Felton attended Great Oak High School in Temecula, California. As a senior he rushed for 1,347 yards on 166 carries and 14 touchdowns. He committed to the University of California, Los Angeles (UCLA) to play college football.

== College career ==
After redshirting in his first year at UCLA in 2016, Felton played in 12 games in 2017, recording 75 yards on 10 carries and one touchdown. He played wide receiver in 2018 and started eight of 12 games, with 20 receptions for 207 yards and a touchdown. In 2019, he rushed 86 times for 331 yards and a touchdown and caught 55 passes for 594 yards and four touchdowns.

After Joshua Kelley departed for the NFL, Felton took over as UCLA's starting running back in 2020. He had career highs of 32 carries and 206 yards in a 27–10 win over Arizona. Due to an unspecified injury, he did not play in the season finale against Stanford. He ended the season as the fourth-leading rusher in the Pac-12 with 111.3 yards per game and five touchdowns. He was named second-team All-Pac-12.

== Professional career ==
Pre-draft measurables
| Height | Weight | Arm length | Hand span | 40-yard dash | 10-yard split | 20-yard split | 20-yard shuttle | Three-cone drill | Vertical jump | Broad jump | Bench press |
|---|---|---|---|---|---|---|---|---|---|---|---|
| 5 ft 8 5/8 in (1.74 m) | 189 lb (86 kg) | 31 1/2 in (0.80 m) | 9 3/8 in (0.24 m) | 4.59 s | 1.62 s | 2.67 s | 4.50 s | 7.31 s | 31.5 in (0.80 m) | 9 ft 6 in (2.90 m) | 10 reps |
All values from Pro Day

=== Cleveland Browns ===
On May 1, 2021, Felton was selected by the Cleveland Browns with the 211th overall pick in the 2021 NFL draft. He signed his four-year rookie contract on May 13. Felton had a productive training camp as a running back, receiver and kick returner. He scored his first career touchdown on September 19 against the Houston Texans. He was named to the PFWA All-Rookie Team.

On August 29, 2023, Felton was released by the Browns.

=== Cincinnati Bengals ===
Felton was signed to the Cincinnati Bengals practice squad on August 31, 2023. His contract expired when the team's season ended January 7, 2024.

=== Chicago Bears ===
On July 28, 2024, Felton was signed by the Chicago Bears. He was waived by the Bears on August 11.

=== Indianapolis Colts ===
On August 12, 2024, Felton was claimed off waivers by the Indianapolis Colts. He was waived on August 27.

=== Birmingham Stallions ===
On November 12, 2024, Felton signed with he Birmingham Stallions of the United Football League (UFL).

=== Chicago Bears (second stint) ===
On December 3, 2024, Felton signed with the Chicago Bears' practice squad. He was released by Chicago on December 10.

=== Birmingham Stallions (second stint) ===
On December 18, 2024, Felton signed with the Birmingham Stallions of the United Football League (UFL).

=== Washington Commanders ===
On January 8, 2025, Felton signed a futures contract with the Washington Commanders. On August 26, he was released by the Commanders as a part of final roster cuts.

=== BC Lions ===
On January 30, 2026, Felton signed as a wide receiver with the BC Lions of the Canadian Football League (CFL). On April 24, the Lions placed Felton on the retired list.

== Coaching career ==
On May 11, 2026, the Cleveland Browns hired Felton to serve as an offensive skill developmental analyst under new head coach Todd Monken.

== NFL career statistics ==
=== Regular season ===
| Year | Team | Games | | Rushing | | | | | Receiving | | | | | Fumbles | |
| Year | Team | GP | GS | Att | Yds | Avg | Lng | TD | Rec | Yds | Avg | Lng | TD | Fum | Lost |
| 2021 | CLE | 16 | 1 | 7 | 24 | 3.4 | 12 | 0 | 18 | 181 | 10.1 | 33 | 2 | 4 | 0 |
| 2022 | CLE | 8 | 2 | 1 | -4 | -4 | -4 | 0 | 2 | 8 | 4 | 5 | 0 | 1 | 0 |
| Total | | 24 | 3 | 8 | 20 | 3.4 | 12 | 0 | 20 | 189 | 10.1 | 33 | 2 | 5 | 0 |
