= Anthony Walker Jr. =

American football player (born 1995)

Anthony Walker
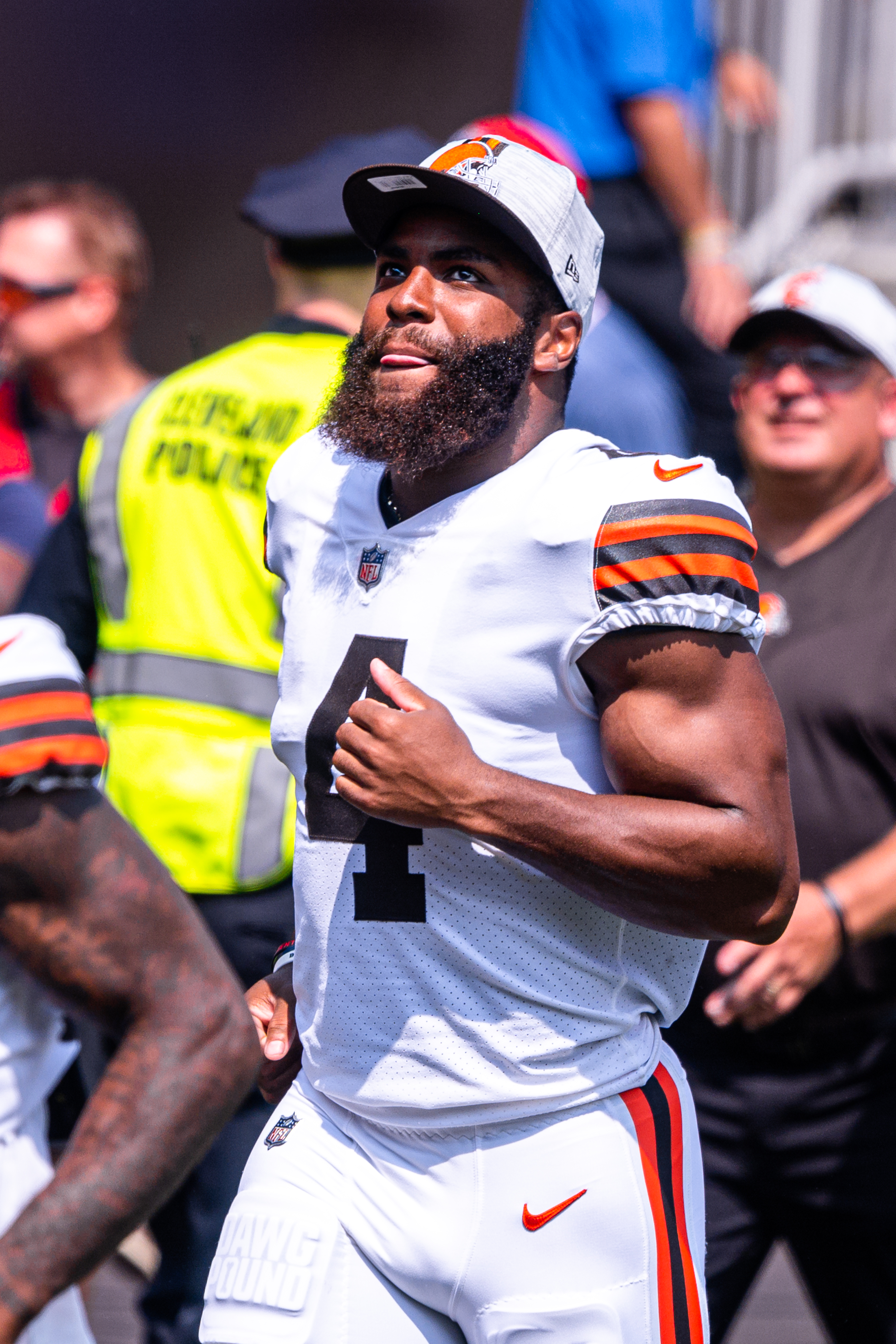
- Walker with the Cleveland Browns in 2021

No. 50, 54, 4, 5, 6, 3
- Position: Linebacker

Personal information
- Born: August 8, 1995 (age 31); Miami, Florida, U.S.
- Listed height: 6 ft 1 in (1.85 m)
- Listed weight: 230 lb (104 kg)

Career information
- High school: Monsignor Edward Pace (Miami Gardens, Florida)
- College: Northwestern (2013–2016)
- NFL draft: 2017: 5th round, 161st overall pick

Career history
- Indianapolis Colts (2017–2020); Cleveland Browns (2021–2023); Miami Dolphins (2024); Tampa Bay Buccaneers (2025)*; Indianapolis Colts (2025)*; Tampa Bay Buccaneers (2025)
- * Offseason or practice squad member only

Awards and highlights
- Third-team All-American (2015); First-team All-Big Ten (2015); Second-team All-Big Ten (2016)

Career NFL statistics
- Total tackles: 581
- Sacks: 5.5
- Forced fumbles: 2
- Fumble recoveries: 4
- Pass deflections: 21
- Interceptions: 4
- Stats at Pro Football Reference

Anthony Laron Walker Jr. (born August 8, 1995) is an American former professional football player who was a linebacker in the National Football League (NFL). He played college football for the Northwestern Wildcats and was selected by the Indianapolis Colts in the fifth round of the 2017 NFL draft.

== College career ==
Walker first saw action in his redshirt freshman season when Collin Ellis went down with a series of injuries. In his first career game, Walker returned an interception for a touchdown against Penn State that capped a Northwestern win. In his first full season as a starter, Walker found success as he recorded 122 tackles to lead the team and 20.5 tackles for loss which was fourth in the nation. For his performance that season, Walker received All-American recognition from the Associated Press and Sports Illustrated as well as Consensus First-team All-Big Ten Conference honors. On November 29, 2016, Walker was named Second-team All-Big Ten.

== Professional career ==
External videos
- Anthony Walker's NFL Combine Workout

Pre-draft measurables
Height	Weight	Arm length	Hand span	Wingspan	40-yard dash	10-yard split	20-yard split	20-yard shuttle	Three-cone drill	Vertical jump	Broad jump	Bench press
6 ft 0 5/8 in (1.84 m)	238 lb (108 kg)	30 3/8 in (0.77 m)	9 1/2 in (0.24 m)	6 ft 1 1/8 in (1.86 m)	4.65 s	1.59 s	2.67 s	4.34 s	7.23 s	30.5 in (0.77 m)	9 ft 8 in (2.95 m)	23 reps
All values from NFL Scouting Combine

=== Indianapolis Colts ===
==== 2017 ====
The Indianapolis Colts selected Walker in the fifth round (161st overall) of the 2017 NFL draft. Walker was the 20th linebacker drafted in 2017.

External videos
- Colts draft Anthony Walker 161st overall

On May 11, 2017, the Colts signed Walker to a four-year, $2.66 million contract that includes a signing bonus of $265,413.

Walker missed organized team activities due to Northwestern's quarters schedule and the league's rules on rookies being unable to join their team until their school's final semester had concluded. Upon entering training camp, Walker competed to be a starting inside linebacker against Sean Spence, Antonio Morrison, Jon Bostic, and Edwin Jackson. Head coach Chuck Pagano named Walker a backup inside linebacker to begin the regular season, behind Bostic and Morrison.

He made his professional regular season debut in the Colts' season-opener at the Los Angeles Rams, but exited in the second quarter of their 46–9 loss after sustaining a hamstring injury. His hamstring injury sidelined him for the next three games (Weeks 2–4). In Week 5, he aggravated his hamstring injury during the third quarter of a 26–23 win against the San Francisco 49ers and was inactive for the next three games (Weeks 6–8). On December 29, 2017, Walker earned his first start after Jon Bostic was ruled inactive due to an injury. He collected a season-high nine combined tackles in the Colts' 23–16 loss at the Baltimore Ravens in Week 16. On December 31, the Colts fired Pagano after they finished the season with a 4–12 record. He finished his rookie season in 2017 with 22 combined tackles (11 solo) in ten games and two starts.

==== 2018 ====
On February 11, 2018, the Colts hired former Philadelphia Eagles offensive coordinator Frank Reich as their new head coach. Defensive coordinator Matt Eberflus opted to change the base 3-4 defense and implemented a base 4-3 defense. Walker entered training camp slated as the starting middle linebacker, but saw competition from Najee Goode. On July 31, it was reported that Walker had injured his groin in the first week of training camp and was sidelined for the remainder of training camp and all four preseason games. Head coach Frank Reich named Walker the starting middle linebacker to start the regular season in 2018, alongside outside linebackers Najee Goode and rookie Shaquille Leonard.

On September 23, Walker recorded nine combined tackles and made his first career interception off a pass by quarterback Carson Wentz during a 20–16 loss at the Eagles in Week 2.

==== 2019 ====
In Week 13 against the Tennessee Titans, Walker recorded a team-high 12 tackles and forced a fumble on running back Derrick Henry on the first play of the game which was recovered by teammate Malik Hooker in the 31–17 loss. In Week 16 against the Carolina Panthers, Walker recorded 10 tackles, sacked rookie quarterback Will Grier once, and intercepted a pass thrown by Grier during the 38–6 win. In Week 17 against the Jacksonville Jaguars, Walker recorded a team high 16 tackles during the 38–20 loss.

==== 2020 ====
In Week 5 against the Cleveland Browns, Walker recorded his first interception off a pass thrown by Baker Mayfield during the 32–23 loss. In Week 13 against the Houston Texans, Walker recovered a fumble lost by Deshaun Watson late in the fourth quarter to secure a 26–20 win for the Colts.

=== Cleveland Browns ===
==== 2021 ====
On March 19, 2021, Walker signed a one-year contract with the Cleveland Browns. Walker was placed on injured reserve with a hamstring injury on September 17. He was activated on October 9 for Week 5.

==== 2022 ====
On March 16, 2022, Walker re-signed with the Browns on a one-year contract. He suffered a torn quad in Week 3 and was placed on injured reserve on September 23.

==== 2023 ====
On March 29, 2023, Walker re-signed with the Browns on another one-year contract. He was placed on injured reserve on January 5, 2024. He started 12 games in 2023, recording 44 tackles, four passes defended, and a forced fumble.

=== Miami Dolphins ===
On March 15, 2024, Walker signed with the Miami Dolphins. He played in 14 games with eight starts, recording 68 tackles, one sack, two passes defended, and one interception.

=== Tampa Bay Buccaneers ===
On March 19, 2025, Walker signed a one-year contract with the Tampa Bay Buccaneers. On August 25, Walker was released by the Buccaneers with a non-football injury designation.

=== Indianapolis Colts (second stint) ===
On September 1, 2025, Walker was signed to the Indianapolis Colts' practice squad.

=== Tampa Bay Buccaneers (second stint) ===
On December 15, 2025, Walker was signed by the Tampa Bay Buccaneers off of the Colts' practice squad.

Walker announced his retirement from professional football on April 2, 2026, after nine seasons in the NFL.

== Personal life ==
Walker wore the number 4 for the Browns until Deshaun Watson was traded to the team in 2022. Watson gave Walker a new Rolex watch in exchange for the number, despite Walker not requesting anything. Following the swap, Walker wore number 5.

== NFL career statistics ==
Year	Team	Games		Tackles					Interceptions						Fumbles			
Year	Team	GP	GS	Cmb	Solo	Ast	Sck	TFL	Int	Yds	Avg	Lng	TD	PD	FF	FR	Yds	TD
2017	IND	10	2	22	11	11	0.0	1	0	0	0.0	0	0	0	0	0	0	0
2018	IND	15	14	105	69	36	1.0	10	1	11	11.0	11	0	4	0	1	0	0
2019	IND	16	16	124	84	40	2.5	6	1	0	0.0	0	0	2	1	0	0	0
2020	IND	16	16	92	65	27	0.0	2	1	11	11.0	11	0	5	0	1	0	0
2021	CLE	9	9	85	57	28	1.0	2	0	0	0.0	0	0	2	0	0	0	0
2022	CLE	3	3	13	7	6	0.0	4	0	0	0.0	0	0	2	0	0	0	0
2023	CLE	12	12	44	23	21	0.0	1	0	0	0.0	0	0	4	1	2	0	0
2024	MIA	14	8	68	34	24	1.0	0	1	5	5.0	5	0	2	0	0	0	0
2025	TAM	2	0	0	0	0	0.0	0	0	0	0.0	0	0	0	0	0	0	0
Career		101	83	581	362	219	5.5	26	4	27	7.3	11	0	21	2	4	0	0
