= Jucy =

Jucy may refer to:

- Jucy Rentals, a car rental and tourism company
- Jucy (film), an Australian comedy film produced in 2010

== See also ==
- Juicy (disambiguation)
