= Juicy =

Juicy, meaning to contain juice, may refer to:

== People ==
- Juicy J (born 1975), American rapper
- Joe Giudice, nicknamed Juicy Joe, on The Real Housewives of New Jersey

== Music ==
- Juicy (band), a 1980s American R&B duo
- Juicy (album), by Willie Bobo, 1967

=== Songs ===
- "Juicy" (Doja Cat song), 2019
- "Juicy" (Better Than Ezra song), 2005
- "Juicy" (The Notorious B.I.G. song), 1994
- "Juicy", by Koda Kumi from the single "4 Hot Wave"
- "Juicy", by Pretty Ricky from Bluestars
- "Juicy", by Rocket Punch from Blue Punch
- "Juicy", by Wrecks-n-Effect from Wrecks-n-Effect

== Other uses ==
- Juicy!, a Philippine entertainment news program
- Juicy Couture, a clothing line

== See also ==
- Jewcy, an online magazine and user community
- Jucy (disambiguation)
- Juissi, a Finnish brand of juices and energy drinks
- Juice (disambiguation)
