= Jarvis Landry =

American football player (born 1992)

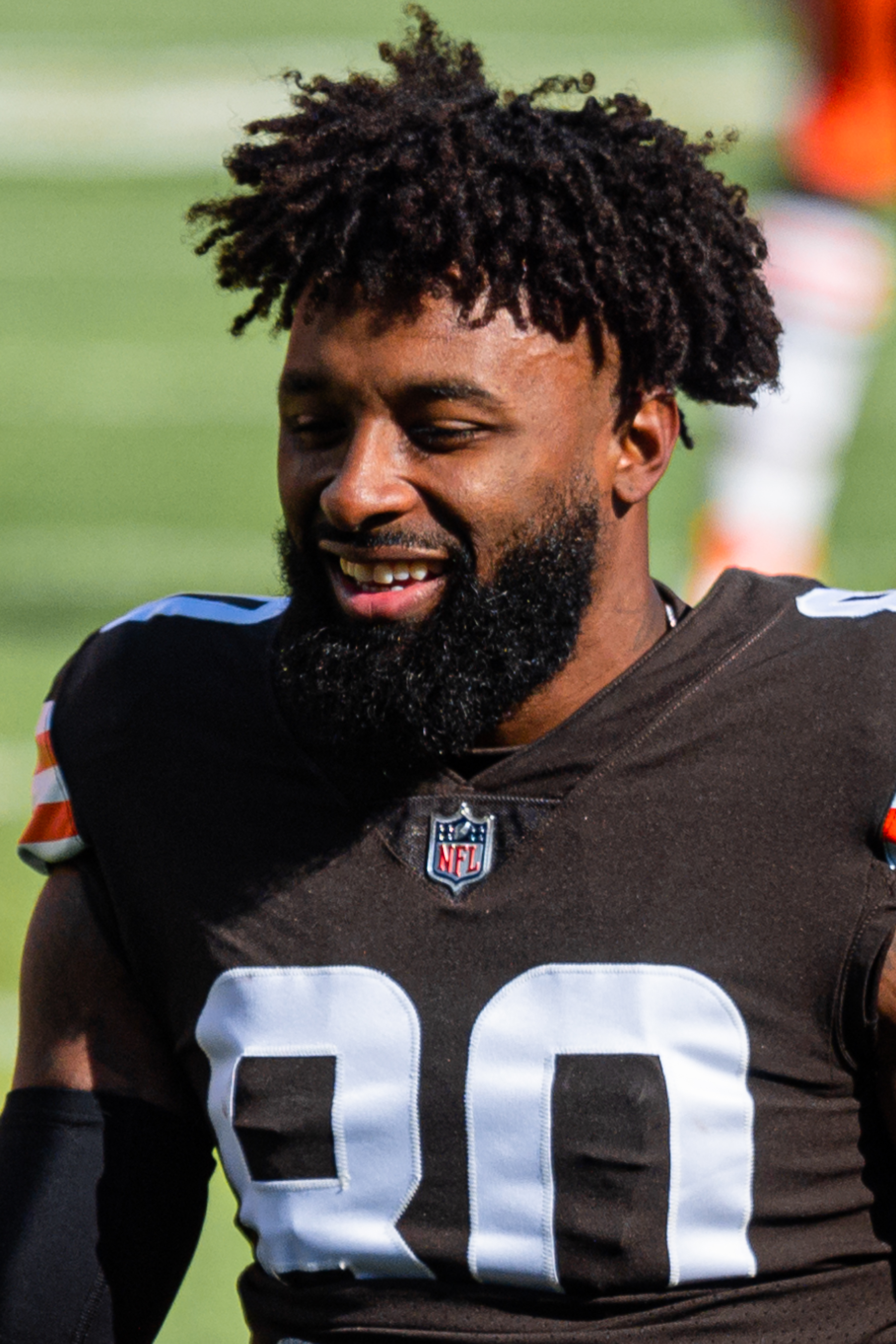
- Landry with the Cleveland Browns in 2021

No. 14, 80, 5
- Position: Wide receiver

Personal information
- Born: November 28, 1992 (age 33); Metairie, Louisiana, U.S.
- Listed height: 5 ft 11 in (1.80 m)
- Listed weight: 202 lb (92 kg)

Career information
- High school: Lutcher (Lutcher, Louisiana)
- College: LSU (2011–2013)
- NFL draft: 2014: 2nd round, 63rd overall pick

Career history
- Miami Dolphins (2014–2017); Cleveland Browns (2018–2021); New Orleans Saints (2022)

Awards and highlights
- 5× Pro Bowl (2015–2019); NFL receptions leader (2017); PFWA All-Rookie Team (2014); Second-team All-SEC (2013)

Career NFL statistics
- Receptions: 713
- Receiving yards: 7,870
- Receiving touchdowns: 38
- Rushing yards: 239
- Rushing touchdowns: 5
- Stats at Pro Football Reference

Jarvis Charles Landry (born November 28, 1992) is an American former professional football wide receiver who played in the National Football League (NFL) for nine seasons. He played college football for the LSU Tigers and was selected by the Miami Dolphins in the second round of the 2014 NFL draft. Landry was named to three Pro Bowls with the Dolphins and two with the Cleveland Browns before spending his final season with the New Orleans Saints. He led the league in receptions in 2017 with 112. His 564 career receptions had been the most by a player through their first six seasons in NFL history, until the record was broken in 2025 by Minnesota Vikings WR Justin Jefferson.

== Early life ==
Landry attended Lutcher High School in Lutcher, Louisiana, where he was a three-sport athlete in football, basketball, and track. As a senior, he had 51 receptions for 716 yards and 11 touchdowns. He finished his high school career with 241 receptions, 3,902 yards, 50 touchdowns, and rushed for 875 yards and 14 touchdowns. At the 2011 Under Armour All-America Game, he caught a record eight receptions for 70 yards and a touchdown. He was regarded as a five-star recruit according to Rivals.com, the third ranked player in the state of Louisiana, and was ranked as the nation's fourth best wide receiver. In track & field, he competed as a long jumper during his sophomore season, recording a personal-best leap of 6.07 meters (19 ft, 8 in) at the 2009 St. Amant Duck Roost Relays, where he finished fourth.

== College career ==
Landry attended and played college football for LSU from 2011 to 2013 under head coach Les Miles. As a true freshman in 2011, Landry played in 14 games with one start. He finished the season with four receptions for 43 yards. As a sophomore in 2012, he played in 13 games with one start. He led the team with 56 receptions and five touchdowns and was second in receiving yards with 573. As a junior in 2013, he combined with Odell Beckham Jr. to form one of the most prolific wide receiver duos in college football. He was a second-team All-Southeastern Conference (SEC) selection. In the first five games of his junior season, he totaled 520 receiving yards and seven receiving touchdowns. He finished his junior season with a team-high 77 receptions for 1,193 yards and 10 touchdowns. After the season, he decided to forgo his senior season and entered the 2014 NFL draft.

== Professional career ==
Pre-draft measurables
Height	Weight	Arm length	Hand span	Wingspan	40-yard dash	10-yard split	20-yard split	20-yard shuttle	Three-cone drill	Vertical jump	Broad jump	Bench press
5 ft 11 1/2 in (1.82 m)	205 lb (93 kg)	31 3/4 in (0.81 m)	10 1/4 in (0.26 m)	6 ft 3 in (1.91 m)	4.77 s	1.73 s	2.84 s	4.59 s	7.56 s	28.5 in (0.72 m)	9 ft 2 in (2.79 m)	12 reps
All values from NFL Combine/Pro Day

=== Miami Dolphins ===
==== 2014 season ====
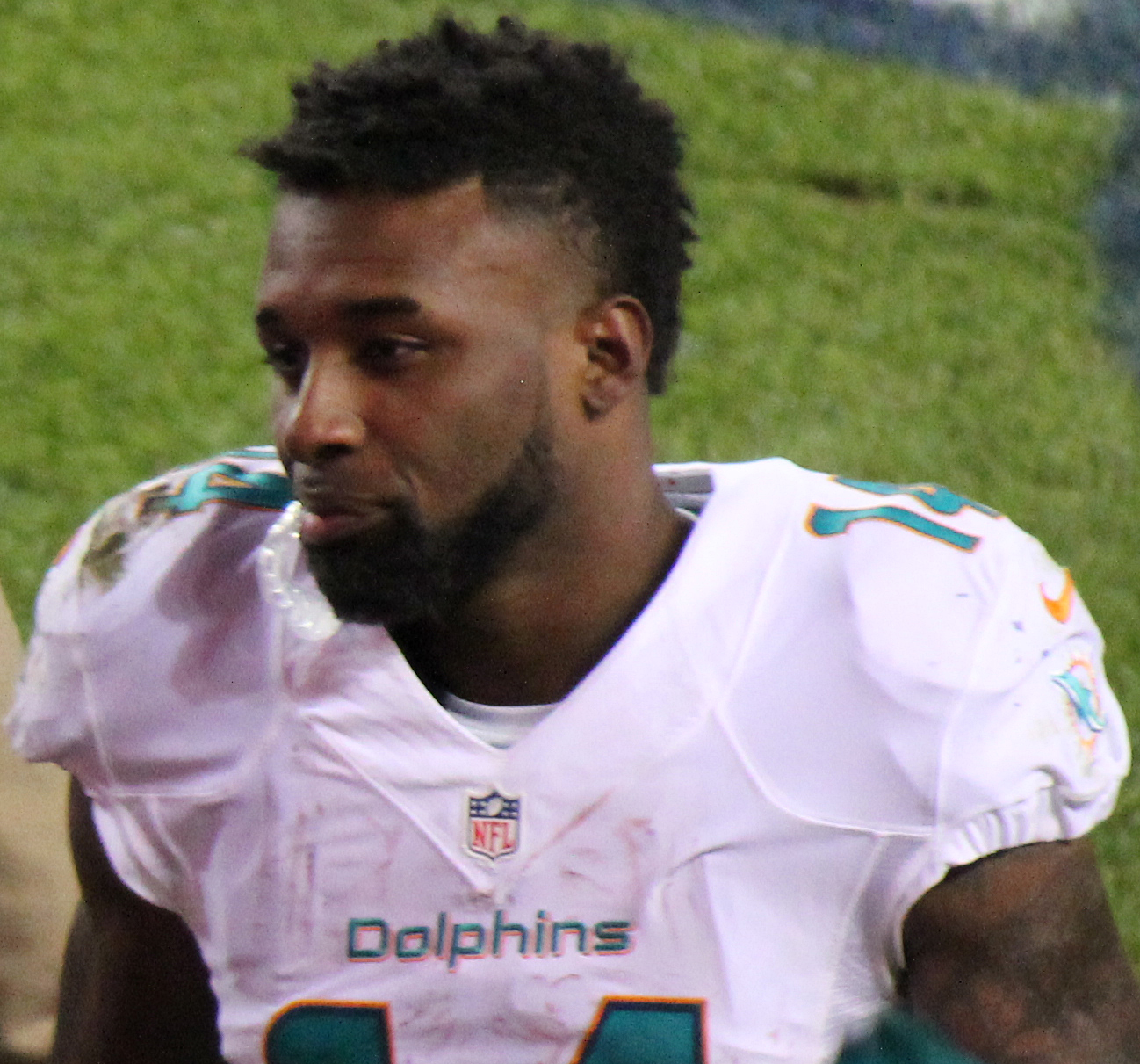
Landry with the Miami Dolphins in 2014

Landry was selected by the Miami Dolphins in the second round with the 63rd overall pick in the 2014 NFL draft. He was the 12th wide receiver to be selected that year.

As a rookie, Landry joined a receiving unit that contained Mike Wallace, Rishard Matthews, Brian Hartline, and Brandon Gibson. Landry caught his first receiving touchdown as a professional in a Week 6 game against the Green Bay Packers on October 12, 2014, in addition to 75 receiving yards. He finished his rookie season with 758 receiving yards and five touchdowns. His 84 catches set a Dolphins record for most receptions by a rookie. He also added 1,158 yards in punt and kickoff returns. He was named to the PFWA All-Rookie Team.

==== 2015 season ====
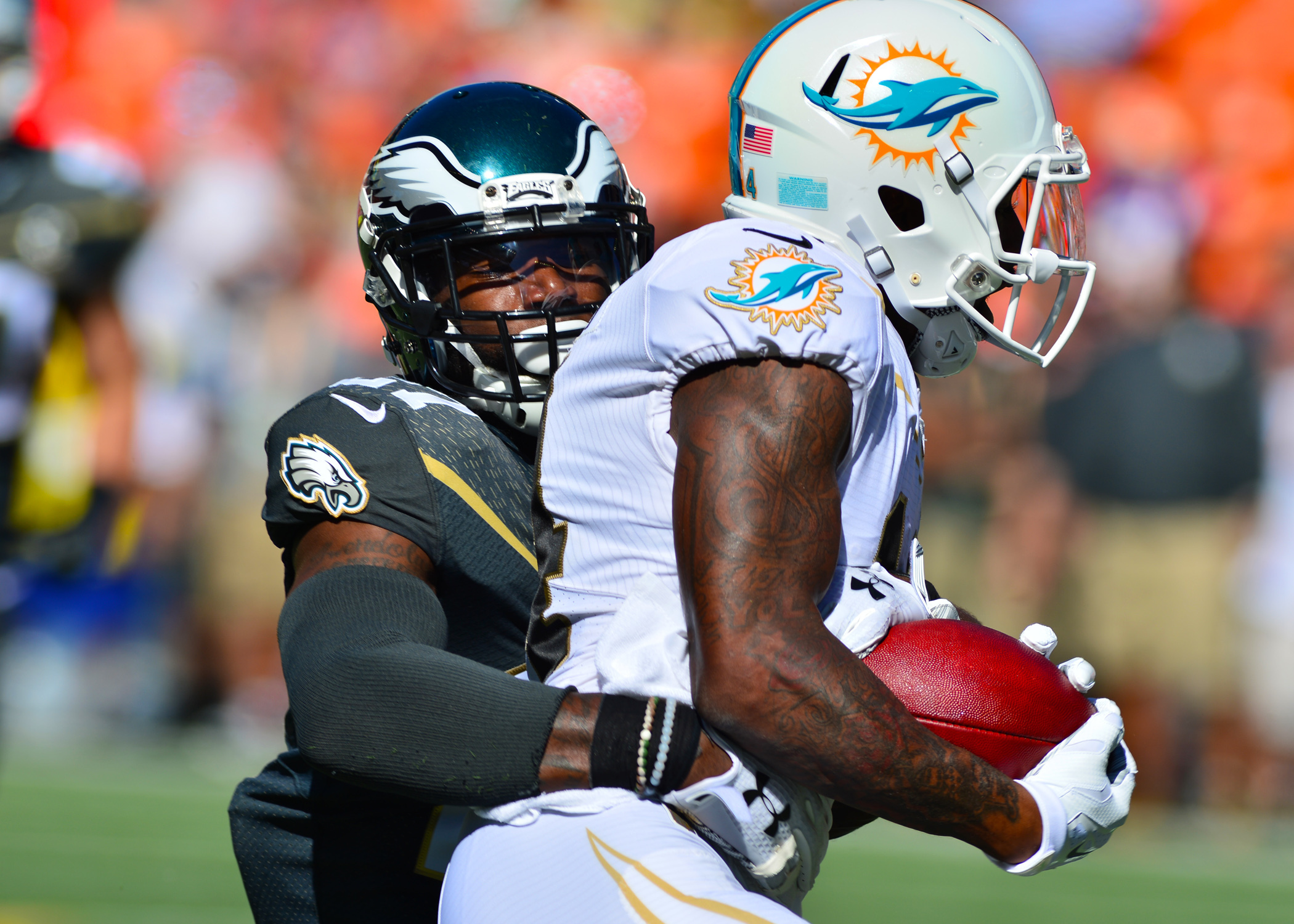
Landry being tackled by Malcolm Jenkins in the 2016 Pro Bowl

In the season opener on the road against the Washington Redskins on September 13, 2015, Landry had his first return touchdown, returning a Tress Way punt 69 yards in 10 seconds, evading four tackles. On December 27, 2015, against the Indianapolis Colts, Landry had a one-handed 26-yard catch, similar to former LSU teammate Odell Beckham Jr.’s one-handed touchdown catch the previous year against the Dallas Cowboys, while setting up 1st and Goal for the Dolphins in what would ultimately become an 18–12 loss. Jarvis would become the first Dolphins player to amass over 100 receptions and 1000 receiving yards in a season. Upon breaking O. J. McDuffie's franchise record for most receptions in a season with 110, Landry was named Dolphins Co-MVP alongside fellow Pro Bowler, strong safety Reshad Jones. He was named to the 2016 Pro Bowl as a replacement for the injured Antonio Brown. Pro Football Focus named Landry to its All-Pro team as a punt returner. Landry's 110 receptions ranked fourth in the NFL for the 2015 season. His 194 receptions in his first two seasons was an NFL record until bettered by the Saints' Michael Thomas in 2017. He was ranked 98th by his fellow players on the NFL Top 100 Players of 2016.

==== 2016 season ====
Landry put together another solid season in 2016 for the Dolphins. He caught 94 passes for 1,136 yards and four touchdowns. He eclipsed the 1,000-yard mark for the second time his career, almost matching his career high in yards from the previous season. Landry's 612 yards after the catch ranked second among NFL wide receivers. He was a contributor in the Dolphins making their first playoff berth since 2008. In the playoffs, Landry and the Dolphins lost to the Pittsburgh Steelers in the Wild Card Round by a score of 30–12. In his playoff debut, he finished with 11 receptions for 102 yards. Landry was named to his second career Pro Bowl when he was added to the AFC 2017 Pro Bowl roster. He was also ranked 42nd by his peers on the NFL Top 100 Players of 2017.

==== 2017 season ====
Landry entered the 2017 season with a new quarterback, Jay Cutler, due to an ACL injury to Ryan Tannehill in the off-season. In Week 2, against the Los Angeles Chargers, Landry tied his career-high with 13 receptions for 78 yards in the 19–17 win. His 13 receptions tied Larry Fitzgerald's performance in Week 3 for the most in a single game in the 2017 season. From Weeks 5–11, he had a receiving touchdown in six of the seven games. In the Week 9 loss to the Oakland Raiders, Landry set the NFL record for most receptions through the first four seasons of a career. Overall, in the 2017 season, he finished with 112 receptions for 987 yards and nine touchdowns. Landry's 112 receptions were the most in the NFL for the 2017 season. He earned his third consecutive Pro Bowl nomination following the 2017 season. At the Pro Bowl, Landry won a skills competition against the other invited wide receivers for “Best hands.” He was ranked 52nd by his peers on the NFL Top 100 Players of 2018.

=== Cleveland Browns ===
==== 2018 season ====
On February 20, 2018, the Dolphins placed the franchise tag on Landry. Despite this, it was later reported that the Dolphins had given Landry permission to seek a trade. On March 3, 2018, Landry informed the Dolphins that he would agree to sign the franchise tag, and officially signed the tag on March 8. On March 9, 2018, the Dolphins agreed to trade Landry to the Cleveland Browns for Cleveland's 2018 fourth-round draft pick (used to select Durham Smythe, previously acquired from Carolina) and the 2019 seventh-round draft pick that was originally acquired from the Pittsburgh Steelers in the Sammie Coates trade. The deal became official on March 14, 2018, at the start of the NFL year. Landry reverted to his college number #80, as #14 was retired in honor of Otto Graham. On April 12, 2018, Landry signed a five-year, $75.5 million extension ($47 million guaranteed) with the Browns, making him the sixth-highest paid receiver at the time.

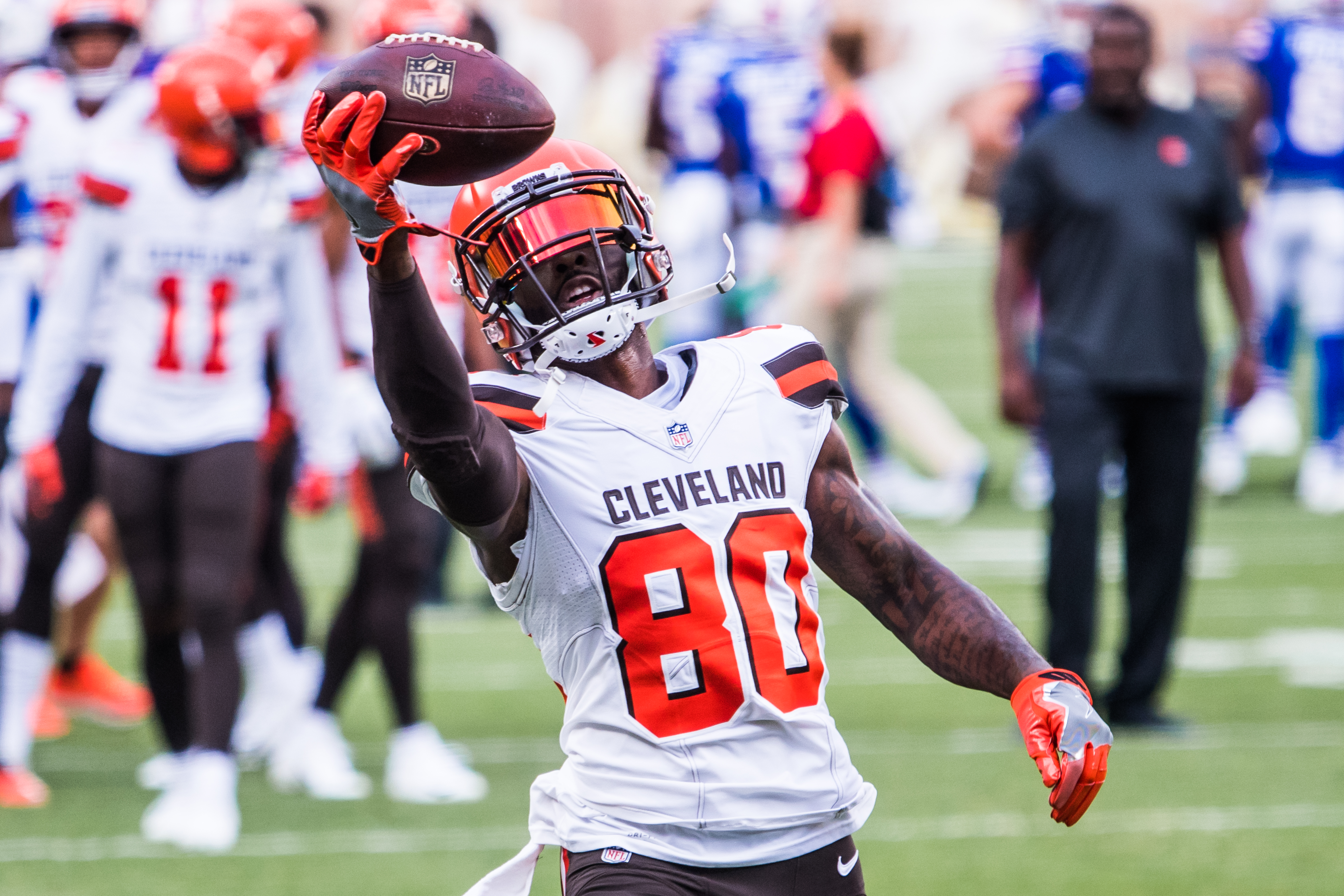
Landry with the Browns in 2018

Landry recorded four games with at least 100 receiving yards in 2018. On October 7, 2018, Landry recorded his 427th career reception, passing Larry Fitzgerald for the most receptions in his first five NFL seasons. In his first season in Cleveland, Landry led the team with 81 receptions for 976 yards and four touchdowns, on his way to his fourth consecutive Pro Bowl. He was ranked 84th by his fellow players on the NFL Top 100 Players of 2019.

==== 2019 season ====
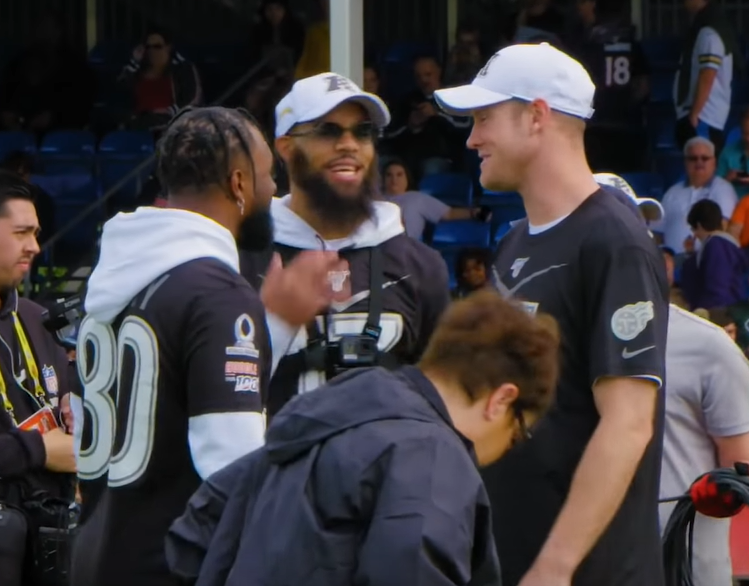
Landry alongside Keenan Allen and Ryan Tannehill at the 2020 Pro Bowl

In Week 4 against the Baltimore Ravens, Landry caught eight passes for 167 yards before exiting the game with a concussion. The Browns later won 40–25. During Week 11 against the Steelers, Landry recorded his 529th reception, breaking DeAndre Hopkins' record of most catches in an NFL player's first six seasons. During Week 12 against his former team, the Miami Dolphins, Landry finished with 10 catches for 148 receiving yards and two touchdowns as the Browns won 41–24. He finished the 2019 season with 84 catches, 1,174 receiving yards, a career high, and six receiving touchdowns en route to a fifth consecutive Pro Bowl. Landry was ranked 61st by his fellow players on the NFL Top 100 Players of 2020.

==== 2020 season ====
On February 20, 2020, Landry had undergone unexpected hip surgery. He confessed that the injury had bothered him in the 2019 season, despite efforts to rehab. He was placed on the active/physically unable to perform list at the start of training camp on August 2, 2020, and activated from the list six days later.

During Week 4 against the Cowboys, Landry finished with five receptions for 48 receiving yards and completed one pass to Odell Beckham Jr. that went 37 yards for his first career passing touchdown. The Browns won by a score of 49–38. During Week 12 against the Jacksonville Jaguars, Landry finished with eight receptions for 143 receiving yards and a touchdown. The Browns won by a score of 27–25, improving to an 8–3 record on the season. Landry missed his first game on Week 16 against the New York Jets due to his being a close contact with a teammate who tested positive for COVID-19.

In the Wild Card Round of the playoffs against the Steelers, Landry recorded five catches for 92 yards and a touchdown during the 48–37 win. In the Divisional Round of the playoffs against the Kansas City Chiefs, Landry recorded seven catches for 20 yards and a touchdown during the 22–17 loss.

In 2020, Landry proved to be a vital part of the gameplan in both the regular season and playoffs, being able to score in any way possible for head coach Kevin Stefanski. In 17 games, Landry had 72 receptions for 840 receiving yards and caught five touchdowns, rushed for a touchdown, and threw a touchdown, giving him a total of seven touchdowns on the year. Landry was ranked 94th by his fellow players on the NFL Top 100 Players of 2021.

==== 2021 season ====
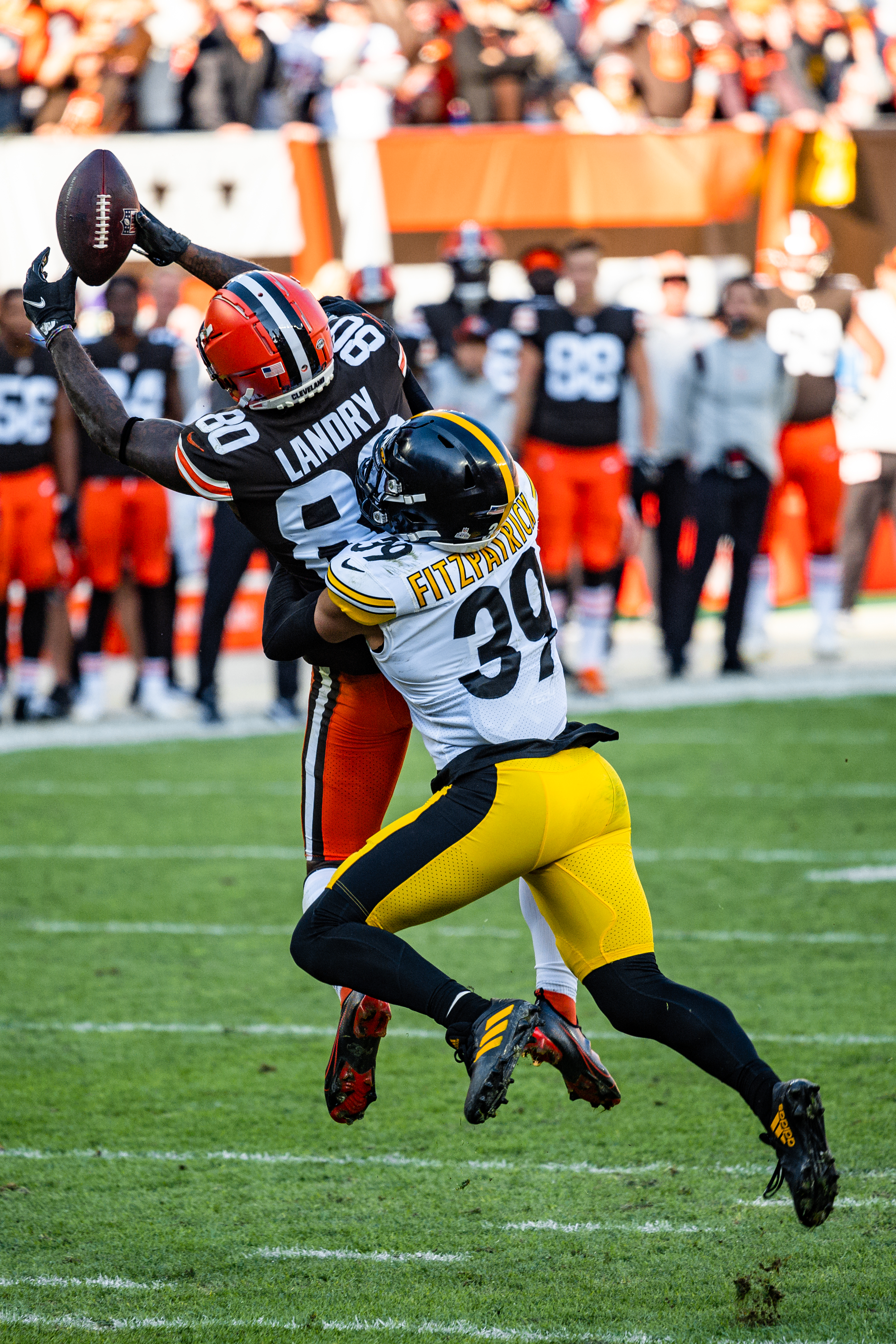
Landry playing against the Pittsburgh Steelers in 2021.

In Week 1 against the Chiefs, Landry caught five passes for 71 yards and added a rushing touchdown in the 33–29 loss. In Week 2, Landry suffered a knee sprain and was placed on injured reserve on September 21, 2021. The Browns activated Landry from injured reserve on October 21, 2021. In Week 12, Landry recorded his only 100-yard game of the season in a loss to the Ravens. Landry finished the 2021 season with 52 receptions for 570 receiving yards and two receiving touchdowns to go along with two rushing touchdowns.

On March 14, 2022, Landry was released from the Browns.

=== New Orleans Saints ===
Landry signed a one-year contract with the New Orleans Saints on May 13, 2022. Landry started the season with seven receptions for 114 yards in a 27–26 victory over the Atlanta Falcons. On December 22, the Saints placed Landry on season–ending injured reserve with an ankle injury. He finished the season with 25 catches for 272 yards and one touchdown through nine games.

== Career statistics ==
=== NFL ===
Legend
	Led the league
**Bold**	Career high

==== Regular season ====
Year	Team	Games		Receiving					Rushing					Passing						Fumbles	
Year	Team	GP	GS	Rec	Yds	Avg	Lng	TD	Att	Yds	Avg	Lng	TD	Cmp	Att	Pct	Yds	TD	Int	Fum	Lost
2014	MIA	**16**	11	84	758	9.0	25	5	2	−4	−2.0	4	0	0	0	0.0	0	0	0	**7**	**4**
2015	MIA	**16**	14	110	1,157	10.5	50	4	**18**	**113**	6.3	22	1	1	1	**100.0**	9	0	0	1	0
2016	MIA	**16**	**16**	94	1,136	12.1	**71**	4	5	17	3.4	13	0	0	1	0.0	0	0	0	2	2
2017	MIA	**16**	**16**	**112**	987	8.8	49	**9**	1	−7	−7.0	−7	0	0	1	0.0	0	0	0	4	2
2018	CLE	**16**	14	81	976	12.0	51	4	3	60	**20.0**	**51**	1	1	2	50.0	63	0	0	1	1
2019	CLE	**16**	**16**	83	**1,174**	**14.1**	65	6	1	10	10.0	10	0	0	0	0.0	0	0	0	0	0
2020	CLE	15	14	72	840	11.7	32	3	4	10	2.5	5	1	**4**	**4**	**100.0**	**74**	**1**	0	2	0
2021	CLE	12	12	52	570	11.0	38	2	5	34	6.8	16	**2**	0	0	0.0	0	0	0	3	2
2022	NO	9	3	25	272	10.9	40	1	0	0	0.0	0	0	0	0	0.0	0	0	0	1	0
Total		132	116	713	7,870	11.0	71	38	39	233	6.0	51	5	6	9	66.7	146	1	0	21	11

==== Postseason ====
Year	Team	Games		Receiving					Rushing					Passing						Fumbles	
Year	Team	GP	GS	Rec	Yds	Avg	Lng	TD	Att	Yds	Avg	Lng	TD	Cmp	Att	Pct	Yds	TD	Int	Fum	Lost
2016	MIA	1	**1**	11	102	**9.3**	17	0	0	0	0.0	0	0	0	0	0.0	0	0	0	0	0
2020	CLE	**2**	**1**	**12**	**112**	**9.3**	**40**	**2**	0	0	0.0	0	0	0	0	0.0	0	0	0	0	0
Total		3	2	23	214	9.3	40	2	0	0	0	0	0	0	0	0.0	0	0	0	0	0

=== College ===
Season	Team	Receiving					Kick returns					Punt returns				
Season	Team	Rec	Yds	Avg	Lng	TD	Ret	Yds	Avg	Lng	TD	Ret	Yds	Avg	Lng	TD
2011	LSU	4	43	10.8	20	0	1	11	11.0	11	0	1	31	31.0	31	0
2012	LSU	56	573	10.2	33	5	4	76	19.0	22	0	1	7	7.0	7	0
2013	LSU	77	1,193	15.5	45	10	—	—	—	—	—	1	0	0.0	0	0
Total		137	1,809	13.2	45	15	5	87	17.4	22	0	3	38	12.7	31	0

== Personal life ==
Landry's older brother, Gerard, played wide receiver at Southern University in Baton Rouge, Louisiana. Landry is the cousin of defensive lineman Glenn Dorsey, who was a standout at LSU from 2004 to 2007.

Landry's best friend is wide receiver and former LSU and Browns teammate Odell Beckham Jr.

On March 18, 2021, Landry announced his partnership with Air Jordan.
