= Daniel Guice =

American lawyer and politician

Member of the Mississippi House of Representatives
- In office 1956–1960

Personal details
- Born: November 30, 1924 Biloxi, Mississippi, US
- Died: April 13, 2017 (aged 92) Biloxi, Mississippi, US

Daniel Dicks Guice (November 30, 1924 – April 13, 2017) was an American lawyer and politician.

== Background ==
Born in Biloxi, Mississippi, Guice graduated from Biloxi High School. He then went to Tulane University and received his law degree from Tulane University Law School. Additionally, he attended University of Mississippi. He practiced law in Biloxi, Mississippi.

From 1956 to 1960, Guice served in the Mississippi House of Representatives. He then served as Mayor of Biloxi from 1961 to 1973. Guice was a Democrat. From 1977 to 1990, Guice served as a county court judge for Harrison County, Mississippi.

In 1980 he appeared on the game show Family Feud as the leader of the Guice family team, which won $28,659. His son was Daniel Guice Jr. who also served in the Mississippi Legislature.

== Death ==
Guice died on April 13, 2017, at his home. He was 92.
