= Daniel Guice Jr. =

American businessman and politician (1953–2026)

Daniel Dicks Guice Jr.
- Born: June 6, 1953; Biloxi, Mississippi, U.S.
- Died: October 23, 2026 (aged 73); Ocean Springs, Mississippi, U.S.
- Education: University of Mississippi; University of Southern Mississippi (Master's)
- Occupations: Businessman, Politician
- Known for: Gulf Coast Director for the Associated General Contractors of Mississippi
- Office: Member of the Mississippi House of Representatives
- Father: Daniel Guice

Daniel Dicks Guice Jr. (June 6, 1953 – October 23, 2026) was an American businessman and politician.

== Life and career ==
Daniel Dicks Guice Jr. was born in Biloxi, Mississippi, the elder son of Daniel Guice, who served as Mayor of Biloxi and was a member of the Mississippi House of Representatives.

He graduated from the University of Mississippi. He then received his master's degree from the University of Southern Mississippi. He was the Gulf Coast Director for the Associated General Contractors of Mississippi.

From 1984 to 2008, Guice served in the Mississippi House of Representatives.

Guice died at his home in Ocean Springs, Mississippi, on October 23, 2026, at the age of 73.
