= The Ferocious Few =

American rock band

The Ferocious Few is a rock band from San Francisco. It has been described as having elements of blues, garage rock and rockabilly.

== Juices ==
At the time of releasing Juices in 2010, the band was a duo consisting of singer and guitarist Francisco Fernandez and drummer Daniel Aguilar. The band name was chosen because it "takes a ferocious few" to change the world, according to Fernandez.

Their debut album Juices was released on Birdman Records on April 13, 2010. In an extensive review, Allmusic saw The Ferocious Few as a blues band; "messed-up, fractured, big-city blues". Commenting on the band only being two people, Deming stated that "the strength of Fernandez's voice, which sounds like it's been polished to a rich semigloss by repeated applications of whiskey and nicotine, certainly covers a lot of ground, as does his strong, elemental guitar work and Aguilar's drumming". Overall, Juices was "a killer debut from a band worth watching". PopMatters gave the album a 6 rating. The album had a distinct street feeling, and it was "hard not to want to roll down the windows and ride along". Fernandez' voice was described as a "sun-cracked drawl", evoking soul and emotion, though his "delivery starts to wear out a bit as Juices presses on". The recording was lo-fi, and might have benefitted from "a tiny bit more polish despite the band’s wise choice to skip out on full-fledged luxury detailing". There was also elements of "trying to show off everything they can do when they would probably be better off focusing on their evident strengths".

The music on Juices has also been described as "the best of whiskey-soaked blues, rock and a hint of lo-fi skuzz". The second half of the album was markedly more "vintage" than contemporary; all in all "an overly solid debut album". Another reviewer praised "the raw, unholy, heavenly pure rock & roll" and the "nasty, raunchy blues"

== Later career ==
Francisco Fernandez later relocated to Berlin. He continued The Ferocious Few with different drummers. In the late 2010s, Fernandez moved to Luxembourg. Here, he released the first music by The Ferocious Few in a decade.
