= Juice (JVM) =

JUICE is a Java ME experimental Java virtual machine written in C according to the Sun Microsystems specifications. The Juice JVM, designed for real-time Java, was specifically developed to run on the NUXI operating system. The most relevant features of Juice are related to the structure for the heap memory, to the object allocation policy and to the garbage collector used.

== Heap memory ==
In Juice, all the available heap memory is shared in "chunks" of pre-fixed size. The memory unit used is the "d-word" (that stands for "double-word"). The actual default size of the chunks is fixed to 64 d-words. The free memory chunks are organized in a linked list, while the chunks occupied by Java objects are connected to each other through a hierarchical structure in a way that resembles the representation of the UNIX file system.

== Real-time object allocation policy ==
The object allocation policy in Juice is strictly connected to the structure used to represent heap memory. Because of this structure, it becomes possible to allocate (and deallocate) Java objects in a time that is dependent only on the size of the object itself (predictability).

== The Pay-per-Use garbage collector ==
The proposed garbage collector is based on a non-copying tracing collector that performs memory reclamation only when a new object has to be allocated. The name of the garbage collector is because the cost paid by the mutator, in terms of wasted time for collector execution, is proportional to the size of the object to allocate.

== Authors ==
Garbage Collector, Heap Memory Management: Corrado Santoro, Roberto Aloi

All the rest: Corrado Santoro
