= Kevin Stefanski =

American football coach (born 1982)

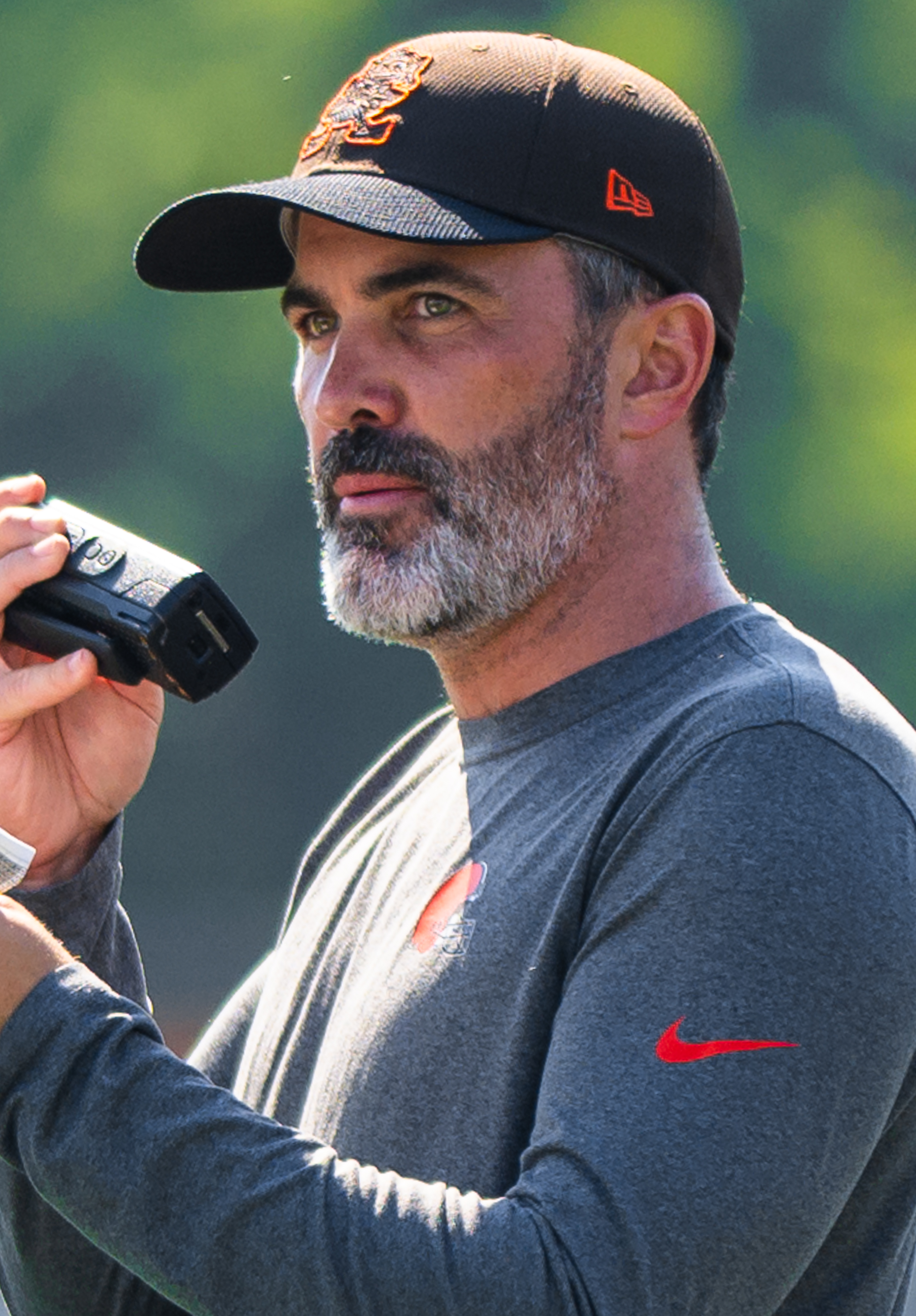
- Stefanski with the Cleveland Browns in 2023

Atlanta Falcons
- Title: Head coach

Personal information
- Born: May 8, 1982 (age 44); Philadelphia, Pennsylvania, U.S.
- Listed height: 5 ft 11 in (1.80 m)

Career information
- Position: Safety
- High school: Saint Joseph's (Philadelphia)
- College: Penn (2000–2004)

Career history
- Penn (2005) Assistant director of football operations; Minnesota Vikings (2006–2019); Assistant to the head coach (2006–2008); Assistant quarterbacks coach (2009–2013); Tight ends coach (2014–2015); Running backs coach (2016); Quarterbacks coach (2017–2018); Interim offensive coordinator (2018); Offensive coordinator (2019); Cleveland Browns (2020–2025) Head coach; Atlanta Falcons (2026–present) Head coach

Awards and highlights
- As a head coach: 2× AP NFL Coach of the Year (2020, 2023)

Head coaching record
- Regular season: 48–63 (.432)
- Postseason: 1–2 (.333)
- Career: 49–65 (.430)
- Coaching profile at Pro Football Reference

Kevin Stefanski (/stəˈfɛnskiː/; born May 8, 1982) is an American professional football coach, who is currently the head coach for the Atlanta Falcons of the National Football League (NFL). He previously served as the head coach of the Cleveland Browns from 2020 to 2025.

Stefanski attended high school in Philadelphia, Pennsylvania at St. Joseph's Preparatory School, when his father was an executive for the New Jersey Nets. After graduation from high school in 2000, Stefanski enrolled at the University of Pennsylvania and played safety for the Quakers, starting for four seasons. As a redshirt junior in 2003, he helped lead Penn to their only undefeated Penn team of the decade and was an All-Ivy League selection in 2002.

Stefanski began his NFL career as an assistant coach for the Minnesota Vikings from 2006 to 2019 and was the offensive coordinator during his final two seasons. Stefanski left Minnesota to become the Browns' head coach in 2020, where he led the team to their first playoff appearance since 2002. He was named NFL Coach of the Year after the season, becoming the first Browns coach to receive the honor since 1976 and the first following the franchise's 1999 return as an expansion team. Stefanski led the Browns to a second playoff appearance in 2023, also winning NFL Coach of the Year for the second time. However, the Browns fired him in January 2026 after going 8–26 in his last two seasons with the club.

On January 17, 2026, Stefanski signed a five-year contract to become the head coach of the Atlanta Falcons.

== Early life and playing career ==
Stefanski graduated from St. Joseph's Preparatory School in 2000 and the University of Pennsylvania in 2004. He played defensive back while at Penn, being named the Quakers Freshman of the Year in 2000. Stefanski was part of the only undefeated Penn team of the decade and was once an All-Ivy League selection.

== Coaching career ==
=== Minnesota Vikings ===
Stefanski joined the Minnesota Vikings in 2006 as an assistant to then-head coach Brad Childress. In 2009, he was promoted to assistant quarterbacks' coach, where he would serve until the 2013 season and had coached quarterbacks such as Brett Favre and Christian Ponder. Despite the Vikings' ups and downs during his tenure, Stefanski survived three head coaching changes (Childress, Leslie Frazier, and Mike Zimmer).

In 2017, after Scott Turner was let go, Stefanski was promoted to coach the Vikings quarterbacks, where he helped transform the Vikings into the NFL's 10th-highest scoring offense. Quarterback Case Keenum had his best season under Stefanski, throwing 22 touchdown passes and only seven interceptions. He previously worked with the running backs in 2016 and the tight ends in 2014 and 2015.

After the 2017 season, the New York Giants requested to interview and hire Stefanski as their new offensive coordinator, but the Vikings denied the request.

After offensive coordinator John DeFilippo was fired following a 21–7 loss to the Seattle Seahawks, Stefanski was named interim offensive coordinator. On January 9, 2019, Stefanski was promoted to full-time offensive coordinator.

=== Cleveland Browns ===
On January 13, 2020, Stefanski signed a five-year contract to become the 18th head coach of the Cleveland Browns, two days after the Minnesota Vikings lost in the NFC playoffs.

Stefanski lost his head coaching debut to the Baltimore Ravens by a score of 38–6. The loss marked the 16th consecutive Week 1 without a win for the Browns. The following week, Stefanski recorded his first career win as a head coach in the 35–30 victory over the Cincinnati Bengals.

During Week 13, Stefanski became the first Browns head coach since Romeo Crennel in 2007 to lead the franchise to a winning season, securing his ninth win with a 41–35 road victory over the Tennessee Titans. Stefanski led the Browns to a 11–5 record, finishing third in the AFC North and clinching the Browns' first playoff berth since 2002. It was also the franchise's best record since their 1999 return. However, Stefanski tested positive for COVID-19 on the Tuesday before the game, preventing him from coaching the wild card game against the Pittsburgh Steelers. The Browns went on to defeat the Steelers on the road 48–37, which was their first playoff win since 1994, as well as their first since their 1999 re-activation. He returned to the team on January 14. The Browns lost the following week to the Kansas City Chiefs in the AFC Divisional Round on the road 22–17. For his work during the 2020 season, Stefanski was named as the Associated Press NFL Coach of the Year. He was the first Browns coach to receive the honor since Forrest Gregg in 1976, in addition to being the first after Cleveland's return in 1999.

During the 2023 season, Stefanski led the team to a second winning season (11–6) along with another playoff appearance becoming the first Browns head coach to lead the team to multiple postseason appearances since Marty Schottenheimer. He again was named Associated Press Coach of the Year. The Browns saw their season end in the Wild Card Round with a 45–14 loss to the Houston Texans.

On June 5, 2024, the Browns signed Stefanski to a contract extension. However, the Browns faltered to a 3–14 record in the 2024 season. They were marginally better the following season, finishing 5–12, before Stefanski was fired from his position as head coach on January 5, 2026.

=== Atlanta Falcons ===
On January 17, 2026, Stefanski was hired to become the head coach of the Atlanta Falcons. Two days later, it was announced that he would retain Jeff Ulbrich as his defensive coordinator at the recommendation of owner Arthur Blank. On January 22, he hired Tommy Rees as his offensive coordinator, who previously worked for him the last two seasons during Stefanski's time with the Browns.

== Head coaching record ==
Team	Year	Regular season					Postseason			
Team	Year	Won	Lost	Ties	Win %	Finish	Won	Lost	Win %	Result
CLE	2020	11	5	0	.688	3rd in AFC North	1	1	.500	Lost to Kansas City Chiefs in AFC Divisional Game
CLE	2021	8	9	0	.471	3rd in AFC North	—	—	—	—
CLE	2022	7	10	0	.438	4th in AFC North	—	—	—	—
CLE	2023	11	6	0	.647	2nd in AFC North	0	1	.000	Lost to Houston Texans in AFC Wild Card Game
CLE	2024	3	14	0	.176	4th in AFC North	—	—	—	—
CLE	2025	5	12	0	.294	4th in AFC North	—	—	—	—
CLE total		45	56	0	.446		1	2	.333	
ATL	2026	3	7	0	.300	TBD in NFC South	—	—	—	
ATL total		3	7	0	.300		–	–	–	
Total		48	63	0	.433		1	2	.333	

== Personal life ==
Stefanski's wife, Michelle, is also from Philadelphia. They got married in 2007 and have three children: Will, Gabe, and Juliette.

Stefanski is the son of NBA executive Ed Stefanski. He is a devout Catholic.
