= 2022 Cleveland Browns season =

74th season in franchise history

- Owner: Jimmy Haslam
- General manager: Andrew Berry
- Head coach: Kevin Stefanski
- Home stadium: FirstEnergy Stadium

Results
- Record: 7–10
- Division place: 4th AFC North
- Playoffs: Did not qualify
- All-Pros: G Joel Bitonio (1st team); RB Nick Chubb (2nd team); DE Myles Garrett (2nd team)
- Pro Bowlers: G Joel Bitonio; RB Nick Chubb; DE Myles Garrett; G Wyatt Teller

Uniform
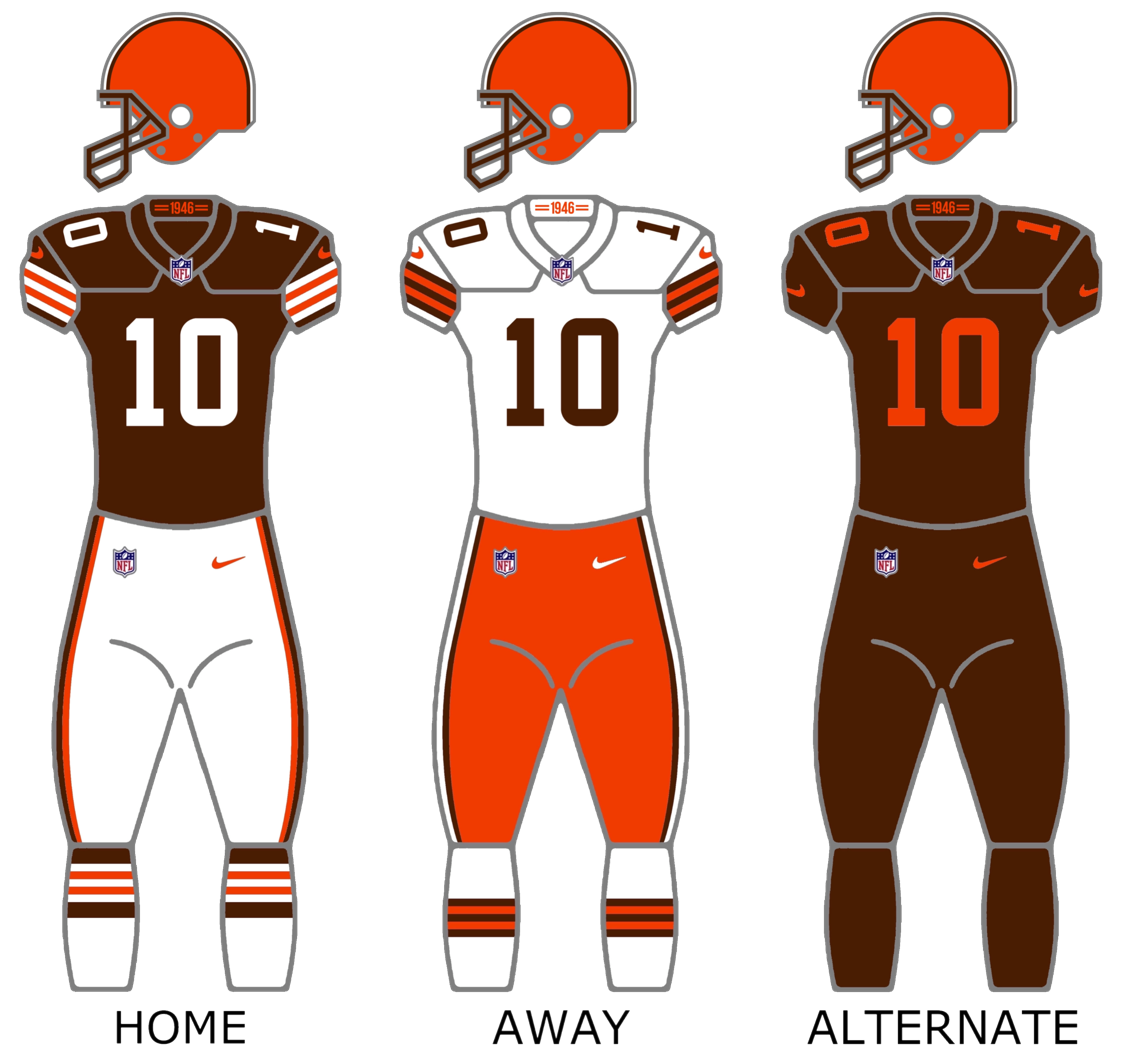

The 2022 season was the Cleveland Browns' 70th in the National Football League (NFL), their 74th overall, and their third under the head coach/general manager tandem of Kevin Stefanski and Andrew Berry. The Browns failed to improve upon their 8–9 record from the previous season as they finished 7–10. The Browns failed to qualify for the playoffs for the second straight season The Browns introduced a new midfield logo, with Brownie the Elf; this is their first season with a new midfield logo since 2016.

On March 18, the Browns acquired quarterback Deshaun Watson from the Houston Texans in a blockbuster trade including three first-round picks. Former starting quarterback Baker Mayfield was later dealt to the Carolina Panthers. Due to Watson's 11-game suspension levied as a result of several sexual assault accusations and lawsuits stemming from his time in Houston, the Browns started backup Jacoby Brissett for the games that Watson was forced to miss. The team posted a 4–7 record under Brissett before Watson made his debut in Week 13.

== Offseason ==
=== Re-signings ===
Position	Player	Tag	Date
DE	Jadeveon Clowney	UFA	May 25
DT	Sheldon Day	UFA	April 18
S	Ronnie Harrison	UFA	April 12
OT	Chris Hubbard	UFA	March 16
RB	D'Ernest Johnson	RFA	June 6
LB	Anthony Walker Jr.	UFA	March 16

=== Signings ===
Position	Player	Tag	2021 Team	Date
LB	Dakota Allen	UFA	Jacksonville Jaguars	June 21
P	Corey Bojorquez	UFA	Green Bay Packers	April 4
QB	Jacoby Brissett	UFA	Miami Dolphins	March 25
DT	Taven Bryan	UFA	Jacksonville Jaguars	March 16
WR	Derrick Dillon	UFA	New York Giants	August 1
QB	Joshua Dobbs	UFA	Pittsburgh Steelers	April 9
WR	Jakeem Grant	UFA	Chicago Bears	March 16
TE	Nakia Griffin-Stewart	UFA	Kansas City Chiefs	May 24
CB	Lavert Hill	UFA	San Francisco 49ers	August 5
S	Luther Kirk	Waiver	Atlanta Falcons	May 17
LB	Jordan Kunaszyk	UFA	Washington Commanders	August 9
OT	Wyatt Miller	Waiver	San Francisco 49ers	August 17
CB	Parnell Motley	Waiver	Detroit Lions	May 18
DE	Chris Odom	UFA	Houston Gamblers (USFL)	August 6
C	Ethan Pocic	UFA	Seattle Seahawks	April 6
CB	Reggie Robinson	Waiver	Houston Texans	May 17
DE	Isaac Rochell	UFA	Indianapolis Colts	April 20
QB	Josh Rosen	UFA	Atlanta Falcons	July 21
DE	Stephen Weatherly	UFA	Denver Broncos	April 18
WR	Javon Wims	UFA	Las Vegas Raiders	April 20
WR	Easop Winston	Waiver	New Orleans Saints	August 16

=== Players lost ===
Position	Player	Tag	2022 Team	Date
WR	Rashard Higgins	UFA	Carolina Panthers	March 16
TE	Austin Hooper	Release	Tennessee Titans	March 17
FB	Andy Janovich	UFA	Houston Texans	March 25
WR	Jarvis Landry	Release	New Orleans Saints	March 14
K	Chase McLaughlin	Release	Indianapolis Colts	May 2
QB	Nick Mullens	UFA	Las Vegas Raiders	April 4
CB	M. J. Stewart	UFA	Houston Texans	March 24
C	JC Tretter	Release	Retired	March 15

=== Trades ===
The Browns made the following trades involving players during the 2022 offseason.

Date	Trade partner	Browns traded	Browns received	Notes
March 16	Dallas Cowboys	2022 5th-round selection 2022 6th-round selection	WR Amari Cooper; 2022 6th-round selection	
March 16	New England Patriots	LB Mack Wilson	DE Chase Winovich	
March 20	Houston Texans	2022 1st-round selection 2022 4th-round selection 2023 1st-round selection 2023 3rd-round selection 2024 1st-round selection 2024 4th-round selection	QB Deshaun Watson; 2024 6th-round selection	
March 20	Buffalo Bills	QB Case Keenum	2022 7th-round selection	
April 30	Los Angeles Rams	CB Troy Hill	2023 5th-round selection	
July 6	Carolina Panthers	QB Baker Mayfield	2024 5th-round selection	

=== Draft ===
2022 Cleveland Browns draft
Round	Selection	Player	Position	College	Notes
1	13	Traded to the Houston Texans (Note: The Browns traded first- and fourth-round selections (13th and 107th overall), 2023 first- and third-round selections (12th and 73rd overall), and 2024 first- and fourth-round selections (23rd and 123rd overall) to the Houston Texans in exchange for QB Deshaun Watson and a 2024 sixth-round selection (203rd overall).)			
2	44	Traded to the Houston Texans (Note: The Browns traded a second-round selection (44th overall) to the Houston Texans in exchange for a third-round selection and two fourth-round selections (68th, 108th and 124th overall).)			
3	68	Martin Emerson	CB	Mississippi State	From Texans
3	78	Alex Wright	DE	UAB	
3	99	David Bell	WR	Purdue	2020 Resolution JC-2A selection (Note: The Browns received a third-round selection and a 2023 third-round selection as a result of the Minnesota Vikings hiring former Browns vice president of football operations Kwesi Adofo-Mensah as general manager. This selection was awarded as part of 2020 Resolution JC-2A, which rewards teams for developing minority coaches and front office personnel.)
4	107	Traded to the Houston Texans			From Lions (Note: The Browns traded 2021 fourth- and seventh-round selections (113th and 257th overall) to the Detroit Lions in exchange for a fourth-round selection (107th overall) and a 2021 fifth-round selection (153rd overall).)
4	108	Perrion Winfrey	DT	Oklahoma	From Texans
4	118	Traded to the Minnesota Vikings (Note: The Browns traded a fourth-round selection (118th overall) to the Minnesota Vikings in exchange for a fifth-round selection (156th overall) and a 2023 fourth-round selection.)			
4	124	Cade York	K	LSU	From Eagles via Texans
5	155	Traded to the Dallas Cowboys (Note: The Browns traded their fifth- and sixth-round selections (155th and 193rd overall) to the Dallas Cowboys in exchange for WR Amari Cooper and a sixth-round selection (202nd overall).)			
5	156	Jerome Ford	RB	Cincinnati	From Ravens via Vikings
6	193	Traded to the Dallas Cowboys			
6	202	Michael Woods II	WR	Oklahoma	From Cowboys
7	223	Isaiah Thomas	DE	Oklahoma	From Lions (Note: The Browns traded their seventh-round selection (234th overall) to the Detroit Lions in exchange for QB David Blough and a seventh-round selection (223rd overall).)
7	234	Traded to the Detroit Lions			
7	246	Dawson Deaton	C	Texas Tech	From Bills (Note: The Browns traded QB Case Keenum to the Buffalo Bills in exchange for a seventh-round selection (246th overall).)

Draft trades

=== Undrafted free agents ===
Name	Position	College	Signed	Cut
Daylen Baldwin	WR	Michigan	August 3	
D'Anthony Bell	S	West Florida	May 13	
Junior Faulk	CB	Delta State	May 13	May 17
Mike Harley Jr.	WR	Miami (FL)	May 13	
Felix Harper	QB	Alcorn State	May 15	May 23
Travell Harris	WR	Washington State	May 13	August 17
Brock Hoffman	C	Virginia Tech	May 13	
Shaun Jolly	CB	Appalachian State	May 13	
Silas Kelly	LB	Coastal Carolina	May 13	
Glen Logan	DT	LSU	May 13	
Zaire Mitchell-Paden	TE	Florida Atlantic	May 13	
Roderick Perry II	DT	Illinois	May 13	
Ben Petrula	OT	Boston College	May 13	
Marcus Santos-Silva	TE	Texas Tech	May 2	August 22
Isaiah Weston	WR	Northern Iowa	May 13	August 1

== Staff ==
2022 Cleveland Browns staff
Front office: Owners – Jimmy Haslam, Dee Haslam, Whitney Haslam Johnson, J. W. Johnson; Chief strategy officer – Paul DePodesta; Executive vice president/COO – David Jenkins; Executive vice president of football operations/general manager – Andrew Berry; Assistant general manager/vice president of football operations – Catherine Raîche; Assistant general manager/vice president of player personnel – Glenn Cook; Vice president of football administration – Chris Cooper; Vice president of research and strategy – Andrew Healy; Vice president of player personnel process and development – Ken Kovash; Director of football administration – Taylor Young; Director of player personnel – Dan Saganey; Director of pro scouting – Adam Al-Khayyal; Assistant director of pro scouting – Sam DeLuca; Director of college scouting – Max Paulus; Senior personnel/coaching executive – Bob Quinn; Senior executive advisor to the GM – Jimmy Raye III; Director of football operations – Tyler Hamblin; Director of research and strategy – Dave Giuliani; Director of scouting research – Mike Cetta; Director of football information systems – Brad DeAngelis; Special advisor – Jim Brown; Head coaches: Head coach – Kevin Stefanski; Offensive coaches: Offensive coordinator – Alex Van Pelt; Quarterbacks – Drew Petzing; Run game coordinator/running backs – Stump Mitchell; Pass game coordinator/wide receivers – Chad O'Shea; Tight ends – T. C. McCartney; Offensive line – Bill Callahan; Assistant offensive line – Scott Peters; Senior offensive assistant – Kevin Rogers; Offensive assistant – Jonathan Decoster; Offensive quality control – Ashton Grant; Bill Willis diversity coaching fellow – Israel Woolfork	Defensive coaches: Defensive coordinator – Joe Woods; Run game coordinator – Ben Bloom; Defensive line – Chris Kiffin; Assistant defensive line – Jordan Thomas; Linebackers – Jason Tarver; Pass game coordinator/defensive backs – Jeff Howard; Assistant defensive backs – Brandon Lynch; Defensive assistant – Zach Dunn; Defensive quality control – Jeff Anderson; Special teams coaches: Special teams coordinator – Mike Priefer; Assistant special teams – Stephen Bravo-Brown; Strength and conditioning: Director of high performance – Shaun Huls; Director of strength and conditioning – Larry Jackson; Assistant strength and conditioning/sports science – Josh Christovich; Assistant strength and conditioning – Monty Gibson; Assistant strength and conditioning – Dale Jones; Assistant strength and conditioning – Evan Marcus; Director of performance nutrition – Katy Meassick

== Final roster ==
2022 Cleveland Browns roster
Quarterbacks (QB): 7 Jacoby Brissett; 8 Kellen Mond; 4 Deshaun Watson; Running backs (RB): 24 Nick Chubb; 34 Jerome Ford; 27 Kareem Hunt; 30 D'Ernest Johnson; Wide receivers (WR): 18 David Bell; 2 Amari Cooper; 16 Jaelon Darden; 25 Demetric Felton; 11 Donovan Peoples-Jones; 12 Michael Woods II; Tight ends (TE): 84 Pharaoh Brown; 88 Harrison Bryant; 85 David Njoku	Offensive linemen (OL): 75 Joel Bitonio G; 78 Jack Conklin T; 70 Drew Forbes G; 72 Hjalte Froholdt C/G; 74 Chris Hubbard T; 66 James Hudson T; 55 Ethan Pocic C; 77 Wyatt Teller G; 71 Jedrick Wills T; Defensive linemen (DL): 99 Taven Bryan DT/DE; 90 Jadeveon Clowney DE; 96 Jordan Elliott DT; 95 Myles Garrett DE; 57 Ben Stille DT; 58 Isaiah Thomas DE; 93 Tommy Togiai DT; 97 Perrion Winfrey DT; 69 Chase Winovich DE; 94 Alex Wright DE	Linebackers (LB): 40 Jermaine Carter OLB; 56 Tae Davis OLB; 42 Tony Fields II OLB; 54 Deion Jones MLB; 19 Reggie Ragland MLB; Defensive backs (DB): 37 D'Anthony Bell FS; 22 Grant Delpit SS; 23 Martin Emerson CB; 31 Thomas Graham Jr. CB; 38 A. J. Green CB; 33 Ronnie Harrison SS; 43 John Johnson FS; 20 Greg Newsome II CB; 21 Denzel Ward CB; 26 Greedy Williams CB; Special teams (ST): 13 Corey Bojorquez P; 47 Charley Hughlett LS; 3 Cade York K	Practice squad: 17 Daylen Baldwin WR; 36 Bubba Bolden SS; 67 Myron Cunningham T; 86 Miller Forristall TE; 82 Mike Harley Jr. WR; 49 Storey Jackson OLB; 92 Sam Kamara DE; 41 John Kelly RB; 29 Herb Miller CB; 83 Zaire Mitchell-Paden TE; 64 Roderick Perry II DT; 15 Marquez Stevenson WR; 79 Tyrone Wheatley Jr. T; Reserve: 52 Dawson Deaton C (IR); 68 Michael Dunn G (IR); 9 Jakeem Grant WR (IR); 59 Joe Haeg T (IR); 53 Nick Harris C (IR); 81 Jesse James TE (IR); 51 Jordan Kunaszyk OLB (IR); 61 Chris Odom DE (IR); 28 Jeremiah Owusu-Koramoah OLB (IR); 50 Jacob Phillips MLB (IR); 10 Anthony Schwartz WR (IR); 44 Sione Takitaki (IR) OLB/MLB; 5 Anthony Walker MLB (IR); 91 Stephen Weatherly DE (IR); -- Isaiah Weston WR (IR); Rookies in italics 53 active, 15 reserve, 13 practice squad

== Preseason ==
Week	Date	Opponent	Result	Record	Venue	Recap
1	August 12	at Jacksonville Jaguars	W 24–13	1–0	TIAA Bank Field	Recap
2	August 21	Philadelphia Eagles	L 20–21	1–1	FirstEnergy Stadium	Recap
3	August 27	Chicago Bears	L 20–21	1–2	FirstEnergy Stadium	Recap

== Regular season ==
=== Schedule ===
Week	Date	Opponent	Result	Record	Venue	Recap
1	September 11	at Carolina Panthers	**W** 26–24	1–0	Bank of America Stadium	Recap
2	September 18	New York Jets	**L** 30–31	1–1	FirstEnergy Stadium	Recap
3	September 22	**Pittsburgh Steelers**	**W** 29–17	2–1	FirstEnergy Stadium	Recap
4	October 2	at Atlanta Falcons	**L** 20–23	2–2	Mercedes-Benz Stadium	Recap
5	October 9	Los Angeles Chargers	**L** 28–30	2–3	FirstEnergy Stadium	Recap
6	October 16	New England Patriots	**L** 15–38	2–4	FirstEnergy Stadium	Recap
7	October 23	at **Baltimore Ravens**	**L** 20–23	2–5	M&T Bank Stadium	Recap
8	October 31	**Cincinnati Bengals**	**W** 32–13	3–5	FirstEnergy Stadium	Recap
9	Bye					
10	November 13	at Miami Dolphins	**L** 17–39	3–6	Hard Rock Stadium	Recap
11	November 20	at Buffalo Bills	**L** 23–31	3–7	Ford Field (Note: Due to public safety concerns regarding a severe winter storm in the Buffalo area, the Browns' Week 11 game at the Buffalo Bills was relocated to Detroit's Ford Field.)	Recap
12	November 27	Tampa Bay Buccaneers	**W** 23–17 (OT)	4–7	FirstEnergy Stadium	Recap
13	December 4	at Houston Texans	**W** 27–14	5–7	NRG Stadium	Recap
14	December 11	at **Cincinnati Bengals**	**L** 10–23	5–8	Paycor Stadium	Recap
15	December 17	**Baltimore Ravens**	**W** 13–3	6–8	FirstEnergy Stadium	Recap
16	December 24	New Orleans Saints	**L** 10–17	6–9	FirstEnergy Stadium	Recap
17	January 1	at Washington Commanders	**W** 24–10	7–9	FedExField	Recap
18	January 8	at **Pittsburgh Steelers**	**L** 14–28	7–10	Acrisure Stadium	Recap

Note: Intra-division opponents are in bold text.

=== Game summaries ===
==== Week 1: at Carolina Panthers ====
Week 1: Cleveland Browns at Carolina Panthers – Game summary

Quarter	1	2	3	4	Total
**Browns**	0	17	3	6	**26**
Panthers	0	7	0	17	**24**

at Bank of America Stadium, Charlotte, North Carolina

- Date: September 11
- Game time: 1:00 p.m. EDT
- Game weather: Cloudy, 80 °F (27 °C)
- Game attendance: 72,205
- Referee: Brad Rogers
- TV announcers (CBS): Spero Dedes, Jay Feely and Aditi Kinkhabwala
- Recap, Game Book

Game information

**First quarter**

- No scoring plays.

**Second quarter**

- CLE – Kareem Hunt 1-yard pass from Jacoby Brissett (Cade York kick), 10:49. Browns 7–0. **Drive: 3 plays, 42 yards, 1:37.**
- CLE – Kareem Hunt 24-yard run (Cade York kick), 4:46. Browns 14–0. **Drive: 8 plays, 78 yards, 4:33.**
- CAR – Christian McCaffrey 1-yard run (Eddy Piñeiro kick), 1:57. Browns 14–7. **Drive: 6 plays, 75 yards, 2:49.**
- CLE – Cade York 26-yard field goal, 0:21. Browns 17–7. **Drive: 9 plays, 52 yards, 1:36.**

**Third quarter**

- CLE – Cade York 34-yard field goal, 7:42. Browns 20–7. **Drive: 13 plays, 58 yards, 7:18.**

**Fourth quarter**

- CAR – Baker Mayfield 7-yard run (Eddy Piñeiro kick), 12:51. Browns 20–14. **Drive: 11 plays, 75 yards, 4:44.**
- CLE – Cade York 36-yard field goal, 6:14. Browns 23–14. **Drive: 10 plays, 57 yards, 6:38.**
- CAR – Robbie Anderson 75-yard pass from Baker Mayfield (Eddy Piñeiro kick), 6:02. Browns 23–21. **Drive: 1 play, 75 yards, 0:11.**
- CAR – Eddy Piñeiro 34-yard field goal, 1:13. Panthers 24–23. **Drive: 7 plays, 64 yards, 1:01.**
- CLE – Cade York 58-yard field goal, 0:08. Browns 26–24. **Drive: 6 plays, 35 yards, 1:05.**

**Top passers**

- CLE – Jacoby Brissett – 18/34, 147 yards, TD
- CAR – Baker Mayfield – 16/27, 235 yards, TD, INT

**Top rushers**

- CLE – Nick Chubb – 22 rushes, 141 yards
- CAR – Christian McCaffrey – 10 carries, 33 yards, TD

**Top receivers**

- CLE – Donovan Peoples-Jones – 6 receptions, 60 yards
- CAR – Robbie Anderson – 5 receptions, 102 yards, TD

The Browns opened their season with a trip to Charlotte to play the Carolina Panthers, led by former Browns quarterback Baker Mayfield. The Browns jumped out to a 20–7 lead, however Carolina scored two touchdowns and a field goal in the final frame to take a 24–23 lead with 1:13 remaining in the game. The Browns, led by backup quarterback Jacoby Brissett, drove to the Carolina 40-yard line, where rookie kicker Cade York hit a 58–yard field goal to give the Browns a 26–24 win.

With the win, the Browns started the season 1–0, the first season opening win since 2004, ending a 17-game winless streak in Week 1. York was named AFC Special Teams Player of the week. York connected on four field goals, including a 58–yard game-winner. This set the NFL record for the longest field goal by a rookie in his team's first game.

==== Week 2: vs. New York Jets ====
Week 2: New York Jets at Cleveland Browns – Game summary

Quarter	1	2	3	4	Total
**Jets**	0	14	0	17	**31**
Browns	7	7	3	13	**30**

at FirstEnergy Stadium, Cleveland, Ohio

- Date: September 18
- Game time: 1:00 p.m. EDT
- Game weather: Sunny, 80 °F (27 °C)
- Game attendance: 67,431
- Referee: Tra Blake
- TV announcers (CBS): Spero Dedes and Jay Feely
- Recap, Game Book

Game information

**First quarter**

- CLE – Nick Chubb 4-yard run (Cade York kick), 4:55. Browns 7–0. **Drive: 14 plays, 90 yards, 8:37.**

**Second quarter**

- NYJ – Garrett Wilson 2-yard pass from Joe Flacco (Greg Zuerlein kick), 13:06. Tied 7–7. **Drive: 13 plays, 75 yards, 6:49.**
- CLE – Amari Cooper 6-yard pass from Jacoby Brissett (Cade York kick), 8:17. Browns 14–7. **Drive: 10 plays, 61 yards, 4:49.**
- NYJ – Breece Hall 10-yard pass from Joe Flacco (Greg Zuerlein kick), 0:11. Tied 14–14. **Drive: 8 plays, 54 yards, 0:54.**

**Third quarter**

- CLE – Cade York 22-yard field goal, 9:58. Browns 17–14. **Drive: 11 plays, 76 yards, 5:02.**

**Fourth quarter**

- NYJ – Greg Zuerlein 57-yard field goal, 14:19. Tied 17–17. **Drive: 9 plays, 51 yards, 4:45.**
- CLE – Nick Chubb 7-yard run (Cade York kick), 9:21. Browns 24–17. **Drive: 9 plays, 75 yards, 4:58.**
- CLE – Nick Chubb 12-yard run (kick failed), 1:55. Browns 30–17. **Drive: 6 plays, 42 yards, 0:35.**
- NYJ – Corey Davis 66-yard pass from Joe Flacco (Greg Zuerlein kick), 1:22. Browns 30–24. **Drive: 2 plays, 75 yards, 0:33.**
- NYJ – Garrett Wilson 15-yard pass from Joe Flacco (Greg Zuerlein kick), 0:22. Jets 31–30. **Drive: 9 plays, 53 yards, 1:00.**

**Top passers**

- NYJ – Joe Flacco – 26/44, 307 yards, 4 TD
- CLE – Jacoby Brissett – 22/27, 229 yards, TD, INT

**Top rushers**

- NYJ – Breece Hall – 7 rushes, 50 yards
- CLE – Nick Chubb – 17 rushes, 87 yards, 3 TD

**Top receivers**

- NYJ – Garrett Wilson – 8 receptions, 102 yards, 2 TD
- CLE – Amari Cooper – 9 receptions, 101 yards, TD

The Browns opened the home portion of their schedule against the New York Jets, looking for their first 2–0 start since 1993. The Browns built a 30–17 lead with just under 2:00 remaining in the game on the strength of three Nick Chubb touchdown runs. However, New York scored two quick touchdowns with a successful onside kick in between to take a surprising 31–30 win.

With the loss, the Browns fell to 1–1.

==== Week 3: vs. Pittsburgh Steelers ====
Week 3: Pittsburgh Steelers at Cleveland Browns – Game summary

Quarter	1	2	3	4	Total
Steelers	0	14	0	3	**17**
**Browns**	7	6	3	13	**29**

at FirstEnergy Stadium, Cleveland, Ohio

- Date: September 22
- Game time: 8:15 p.m. EDT
- Game weather: Cloudy, 60 °F (16 °C)
- Game attendance: 67,431
- Referee: Clay Martin
- TV announcers (WEWS/Prime Video): Al Michaels, Kirk Herbstreit and Kaylee Hartung
- Recap, Game Book

Game information

**First quarter**

- CLE – Amari Cooper 11-yard pass from Jacoby Brissett (Cade York kick), 2:54. Browns 7–0. **Drive: 3 plays, 60 yards, 3:01**

**Second quarter**

- PIT – Najee Harris 5-yard run (Chris Boswell kick), 14:55. Tied 7–7. **Drive: 7 plays, 75 yards, 2:59**
- CLE – David Njoku 7-yard pass from Jacoby Brissett (kick failed), 8:58. Browns 13–7, **Drive: 12 plays, 79 yards, 5:57**
- PIT – Mitchell Trubisky 1-yard run (Chris Boswell kick), 3:50. Steelers 14–13. **Drive: 10 plays, 75 yards, 5:08**

**Third quarter**

- CLE – Cade York 34-yard field goal, 2:31. Browns 16–14. **Drive: 14 plays, 70 yards, 7:02**

**Fourth quarter**

- CLE – Nick Chubb 1-yard run (Cade York kick), 9:29. Browns 23–14. **Drive: 11 plays, 80 yards, 6:35**
- PIT – Chris Boswell 34-yard field goal, 1:48. Browns 23–17. **Drive: 7 plays, 63 yards, 1:25**
- CLE – Denzel Ward fumble recovery in end zone, 0:00. Browns 29–17.

**Top passers**

- PIT – Mitchell Trubisky – 20/32, 207 yards
- CLE – Jacoby Brissett – 21/31, 220 yards, 2 TD

**Top rushers**

- PIT – Najee Harris – 15 rushes, 56 yards, TD
- CLE – Nick Chubb – 23 rushes, 113 yards, TD

**Top receivers**

- PIT – Diontae Johnson – 8 receptions, 84 yards
- CLE – Amari Cooper – 7 receptions, 101 yards, TD

After a tough loss, the Browns stayed home to take on the rival Pittsburgh Steelers on a very windy Thursday night. Both teams scored two touchdowns in the first half, but a missed extra point by Cade York gave the Steelers a 14–13 lead heading into halftime. The Browns took a 16–14 lead on a York field goal in the third quarter and extended it to 23–14 on a Nick Chubb touchdown run, but a Chris Boswell field goal cut the Browns' lead to six points with 1:48 remaining. Unable to run the clock out, the Browns punted the ball to the Pittsburgh 4-yard line with nine seconds remaining. However, an unsuccessful hook-and-latter play by was fumbled by Pittsburgh and recovered by Browns' CB Denzel Ward in the end zone to make the final score 29–17.

With the win, the Browns improved to 2–1.

==== Week 4: at Atlanta Falcons ====
Week 4: Cleveland Browns at Atlanta Falcons – Game summary

Quarter	1	2	3	4	Total
Browns	0	10	3	7	**20**
**Falcons**	10	0	0	13	**23**

at Mercedes-Benz Stadium, Atlanta, Georgia

- Date: October 2
- Game time: 1:00 p.m. EDT
- Game weather: Sunny, 72 °F (22 °C) (retractable roof open)
- Game attendance: 69,435
- Referee: Craig Wrolstad
- TV announcers (CBS): Andrew Catalon and Tiki Barber
- Recap, Game Book

Game information

**First quarter**

- ATL – Younghoe Koo 30-yard field goal, 3:26. Falcons 3–0. **Drive: 14 plays, 84 yards, 6:43.**
- ATL – Cordarrelle Patterson 13-yard run (Younghoe Koo kick), 1:20. Falcons 10–0. **Drive: 3 plays, 31 yards, 1:32.**

**Second quarter**

- CLE – Jacoby Brissett 4-yard run (Cade York kick), 7:35. Falcons 10–7. **Drive: 16 plays, 75 yards, 8:45.**
- CLE – Cade York 29-yard field goal, 0:07. Tied 10–10. **Drive: 13 plays, 69 yards, 6:24.**

**Third quarter**

- CLE – Cade York 45-yard field goal, 3:06. Browns 13–10. **Drive: 7 plays, 16 yards, 3:51.**

**Fourth quarter**

- ATL – Caleb Huntley 5-yard run (Younghoe Koo kick), 12:51. Falcons 17–13. **Drive: 10 plays, 75 yards, 5:15.**
- CLE – Nick Chubb 28-yard run (Cade York kick), 9:51. Browns 20–17. **Drive: 6 plays, 75 yards, 3:00.**
- ATL – Younghoe Koo 21-yard field goal, 7:19. Tied 20–20. **Drive: 7 plays, 73 yards, 2:32.**
- ATL – Younghoe Koo 45-yard field goal, 2:28. Falcons 23–20. **Drive: 6 plays, 64 yards, 1:07.**

**Top passers**

- CLE – Jacoby Brissett – 21/35, 234 yards, INT
- ATL – Marcus Mariota – 7/19, 139 yards, INT

**Top rushers**

- CLE – Nick Chubb – 19 rushes, 118 yards, TD
- ATL – Tyler Allgeier – 10 rushes, 84 yards

**Top receivers**

- CLE – David Njoku – 5 receptions, 73 yards
- ATL – Olamide Zaccheaus – 2 receptions, 55 yards

The Browns traveled to Atlanta to take on the Falcons. Atlanta opened a 10–0 lead in the first quarter on a Younghoe Koo field goal and a Cordarrelle Patterson touchdown run. However Cleveland answered with a Jacoby Brissett touchdown run and a Cade York field goal to tie the game 10–10 at halftime. York added another field goal to give the Browns a 13–10. The two teams traded touchdowns, giving the Browns a 20–17 lead after three quarters. Koo booted a pair of field goals in the fourth quarter to give the Falcons a 23–20 win.

With the loss, the Browns fell to 2–2.

==== Week 5: vs. Los Angeles Chargers ====
Week 5: Los Angeles Chargers at Cleveland Browns – Game summary

Quarter	1	2	3	4	Total
**Chargers**	3	14	10	3	**30**
Browns	14	7	7	0	**28**

at FirstEnergy Stadium, Cleveland, Ohio

- Date: October 9
- Game time: 1:00 p.m. EDT
- Game weather: Sunny, 59 °F (15 °C)
- Game attendance: 67,431
- Referee: Adrian Hill
- TV announcers (CBS): Greg Gumbel, Adam Archuleta and AJ Ross
- Recap, Game Book

Game information

**First quarter**

- CLE – Nick Chubb 41-yard run (Cade York kick), 12:01. Browns 7–0. **Drive: 5 plays, 75 yards, 2:59.**
- CLE – Amari Cooper 11-yard pass from Jacoby Brissett (Cade York kick), 4:01. Browns 14–0. **Drive: 9 plays, 72 yards, 4:51.**
- LAC – Taylor Bertolet 28-yard field goal, 2:26. Browns 14–3. **Drive: 5 plays, 66 yards, 1:35.**

**Second quarter**

- LAC – Joshua Kelley 5-yard run (Taylor Bertolet kick), 13:39. Browns 14–10. **Drive: 5 plays, 75 yards, 2:02.**
- LAC – Austin Ekeler 12-yard pass from Justin Herbert (Taylor Bertolet kick), 5:51. Chargers 17–14. **Drive: 12 plays, 99 yards, 6:00.**
- CLE – Nick Chubb 2-yard run (Cade York kick), 2:55. Browns 21–17. **Drive: 6 plays, 75 yards, 2:56.**

**Third quarter**

- LAC – Austin Ekeler 22-yard run (Taylor Bertolet kick), 10:21. Chargers 24–21. **Drive: 9 plays, 75 yards, 4:39.**
- LAC – Taylor Bertolet 25-yard field goal, 5:47. Chargers 27–21. **Drive: 7 plays, 23 yards, 3:04.**
- CLE – Kareem Hunt 2-yard run (Cade York kick), 0:55. Browns 28–27. **Drive: 11 plays, 75 yards, 4:52.**

**Fourth quarter**

- LAC – Taylor Bertolet 27-yard field goal, 9:29. Chargers 30–28. **Drive: 13 plays, 66 yards, 6:26.**

**Top passers**

- LAC – Justin Herbert – 22/34, 228 yards, TD
- CLE – Jacoby Brissett – 21/34, 230 yards, TD, INT

**Top rushers**

- LAC – Austin Ekeler – 16 rushes, 173 yards, TD
- CLE – Nick Chubb – 17 rushes, 134 yards, 2 TD

**Top receivers**

- LAC – Mike Williams – 10 receptions, 134 yards
- CLE – Amari Cooper – 7 receptions, 76 yards, TD

The Browns returned home to take on the Los Angeles Chargers after a tough loss in Atlanta. Cleveland took a 7–0 lead five plays into the game when Nick Chubb broke numerous tackles on a 41-yard touchdown run, and doubled their lead on a Jacoby Brissett touchdown pass to Amari Cooper. However, Los Angeles scored the next 17 points on a Taylor Bertolet field goal and two touchdowns on a Joshua Kelley run and a Justin Herbert pass to Austin Ekeler. Cleveland retook the lead with Chubb's second touchdown run, making the score 21–17 at halftime.

On the opening drive of the second half, Herbert and Williams connected for 21 yards to convert a 3rd and 12, leading to an Ekeler touchdown run as the Chargers retook the lead at 24–21. Soon afterwards, Cleveland went for it on 4th and 1 from their own 34, but Kareem Hunt was tackled for a loss, setting up another Bertolet field goal. Hunt scored on Cleveland's next drive, putting Cleveland up 28–27 late in the 3rd quarter. Runs of 16 yards by Ekeler and 17 yards by Kelley then helped the Chargers drive inside Cleveland's 10, where they had to settle for their third short field goal of the game to take a 30–28 lead.

Late in the game, the Chargers went for 4th and 2 with 1:14 remaining. A conversion would have allowed Los Angeles to run out the clock. However, Herbert's pass was broken up and the Browns took over at the Los Angeles 45. Brissett managed a 10-yard completion, but could move the ball no closer, and York's 54-yard kick missed narrowly to the right with 11 seconds to play.

With the loss the Browns fell to 2–3.

==== Week 6: vs. New England Patriots ====
Week 6: New England Patriots at Cleveland Browns – Game summary

Quarter	1	2	3	4	Total
**Patriots**	3	7	14	14	**38**
Browns	3	3	0	9	**15**

at FirstEnergy Stadium, Cleveland, Ohio

- Date: October 16
- Game time: 1:00 p.m. EDT
- Game weather: Sunny, 62 °F (17 °C)
- Game attendance: 67,431
- Referee: Scott Novak
- TV announcers (CBS): Kevin Harlan, Trent Green and Melanie Collins
- Recap, Game Book

Game information

**First quarter**

- NE – Nick Folk 19-yard field goal, 7:31. Patriots 3–0. **Drive: 12 plays, 63 yards, 6:50.**
- CLE – Cade York 39-yard field goal, 3:00. Tied 3–3. **Drive: 9 plays, 54 yards, 4:31.**

**Second quarter**

- NE – Rhamondre Stevenson 31-yard run (Nick Folk kick), 3:23. Patriots 10–3. **Drive: 9 plays, 87 yards, 4:25.**
- CLE – Cade York 48-yard field goal, 0:26. Patriots 10–6. **Drive: 9 plays, 42 yards, 2:57.**

**Third quarter**

- NE – Tyquan Thornton 2-yard pass from Bailey Zappe (Nick Folk kick), 11:22. Patriots 17–6. **Drive: 7 plays, 75 yards, 3:38.**
- NE – Hunter Henry 31-yard pass from Bailey Zappe (Nick Folk kick), 5:32. Patriots 24–6. **Drive: 3 plays, 40 yards, 1:30.**

**Fourth quarter**

- CLE – Cade York 51-yard field goal, 14:35. Patriots 24–9. **Drive: 9 plays, 48 yards, 2:39.**
- CLE – Amari Cooper 15-yard pass from Jacoby Brissett (pass failed), 6:17. Patriots 24–15. **Drive: 8 plays, 65 yards, 2:44.**
- NE – Tyquan Thornton 19-yard run (Nick Folk kick), 4:28. Patriots 31–15. **Drive: 1 play, 19 yards, 0:04.**
- NE – Rhamondre Stevenson 6-yard run (Nick Folk kick), 3:40. Patriots 38–15. **Drive: 3 plays, 8 yards, 0:16.**

**Top passers**

- NE – Bailey Zappe – 24/34, 309 yards, 2 TD
- CLE – Jacoby Brissett – 21/45, 266 yards, TD, 2 INT

**Top rushers**

- NE – Rhamondre Stevenson – 19 rushes, 76 yards, 2 TD
- CLE – Nick Chubb – 12 rushes, 56 yards

**Top receivers**

- NE – DeVante Parker – 4 receptions, 64 yards
- CLE – Donovan Peoples-Jones – 4 receptions, 74 yards

The Browns stayed home to take on the New England Patriots. New England was led by rookie backup quarterback Bailey Zappe due to an injury to starter Mac Jones. After the teams traded field goals in the first quarter, New England scored the game's first touchdown on a Rhamondre Stevenson 31-yard run. Cade York added his second field goal of the game late in the second quarter, giving New England a 10–6 halftime lead.

New England broke away with two Zappe touchdown passes in the third quarter to build their lead to 24–6. Cleveland then closed New England's lead to 24–15 with a York field goal and Jacoby Brissett touchdown pass to Amari Cooper with just over six minutes remaining. However, a failed onside kick and a Brissett interception led to two New England touchdowns, making the final score 38–15.

With the loss, the Browns fell to 2–4. During the game, DE Myles Garrett set the franchise record for most career sacks with 62.5, breaking the mark of 62 previously held by Clay Matthews.

==== Week 7: at Baltimore Ravens ====
Week 7: Cleveland Browns at Baltimore Ravens – Game summary

Quarter	1	2	3	4	Total
Browns	10	0	3	7	**20**
**Ravens**	3	10	7	3	**23**

at M&T Bank Stadium, Baltimore, Maryland

- Date: October 23
- Game time: 1:00 p.m. EDT
- Game weather: Cloudy, 64 °F (18 °C)
- Game attendance: 70,461
- Referee: Shawn Smith
- TV announcers (CBS): Kevin Harlan, Trent Green and Melanie Collins
- Recap, Game Book

Game information

**First quarter**

- CLE – Nick Chubb 2-yard run (Cade York kick), 8:23. Browns 7–0. **Drive: 11 plays, 75 yards, 6:37.**
- BAL – Justin Tucker 32-yard field goal, 3:27. Browns 7–3. **Drive: 9 plays, 61 yards, 4:56.**
- CLE – Cade York 41-yard field goal, 0:18. Browns 10–3. **Drive: 5 plays, 52 yards, 3:09.**

**Second quarter**

- BAL – Justin Tucker 34-yard field goal, 10:05. Browns 10–6. **Drive: 4 plays, 5 yards, 1:38.**
- BAL – Gus Edwards 7-yard run (Justin Tucker kick), 1:57. Ravens 13–10. **Drive: 10 plays, 80 yards, 6:11.**

**Third quarter**

- BAL – Gus Edwards 1-yard run (Justin Tucker kick), 7:39. Ravens 20–10. **Drive: 8 plays, 25 yards, 4:18.**
- CLE – Cade York 37-yard field goal, 2:40. Ravens 20–13. **Drive: 10 plays, 56 yards, 4:59.**

**Fourth quarter**

- BAL – Justin Tucker 55-yard field goal, 11:24. Ravens 23–13. **Drive: 13 plays, 38 yards, 6:16.**
- CLE – Kareem Hunt 2-yard run (Cade York kick), 9:00. Ravens 23–20. **Drive: 7 plays, 75 yards, 2:24.**

**Top passers**

- CLE – Jacoby Brissett – 22/27, 258 yards
- BAL – Lamar Jackson – 9/16, 120 yards

**Top rushers**

- CLE – Nick Chubb – 16 rushes, 91 yards, TD
- BAL – Gus Edwards – 16 rushes, 66 yards, 2 TD

**Top receivers**

- CIN – Amari Cooper – 3 receptions, 74 yards
- BAL – Devin Duvernay – 2 receptions, 42 yards

The Browns traveled to Baltimore for their first meeting with the division rival Baltimore Ravens, looking to avoid a fourth straight loss. The Browns opened the scoring with a Nick Chubb touchdown run. After the two teams swapped field goals, the Browns held a 10–3 lead after one quarter. However, Baltimore scored the next 17 points on a Justin Tucker field goal and a pair of Gus Edwards touchdown runs to build a 20–10 lead.

The teams again traded field goals and Kareem Hunt added a touchdown run to close the Ravens' lead to 23–20 with nine minutes remaining. Just before the two-minute warning, York attempted a potential game-tying 60-yard field goal, but it was blocked. The Browns got the ball back with 16 seconds remaining, but a failed hook-and-ladder ended the game.

With the loss, the Browns fell to 2–5. This marked the Browns' first four-game losing streak since 2019.

==== Week 8: vs. Cincinnati Bengals ====
Week 8: Cincinnati Bengals at Cleveland Browns – Game summary

Quarter	1	2	3	4	Total
Bengals	0	0	0	13	**13**
**Browns**	0	11	14	7	**32**

at FirstEnergy Stadium, Cleveland, Ohio

- Date: October 31
- Game time: 8:15 p.m. EDT
- Game weather: Cloudy, 66 °F (19 °C)
- Game attendance: 67,431
- Referee: Bill Vinovich
- TV announcers (WEWS/ESPN): Joe Buck, Troy Aikman and Lisa Salters
- Recap, Game Book

Game information

**First quarter**

- No scoring plays.

**Second quarter**

- CLE – Nick Chubb 3-yard run (Nick Chubb run), 5:04. Browns 8–0. **Drive: 10 plays, 78 yards, 5:45.**
- CLE – Cade York 55-yard field goal, 0:00. Browns 11–0. **Drive: 6 plays, 26 yards, 0:40.**

**Third quarter**

- CLE – Jacoby Brissett 3-yard run (Cade York kick), 8:57. Browns 18–0. **Drive: 11 plays, 75 yards, 6:03.**
- CLE – Amari Cooper 4-yard pass from Jacoby Brissett (Cade York kick), 3:10. Browns 25–0. **Drive: 8 plays, 60 yards, 4:17.**

**Fourth quarter**

- CIN – Tyler Boyd 13-yard pass from Joe Burrow (kick failed), 14:15. Browns 25–6. **Drive: 9 plays, 73 yards, 3:55.**
- CLE – Nick Chubb 11-yard run (Cade York kick), 8:46. Browns 32–6. **Drive: 8 plays, 83 yards, 5:29.**
- CIN – Tee Higgins 41-yard pass from Joe Burrow (Evan McPherson kick), 6:40. Browns 32–13. **Drive: 5 plays, 75 yards, 2:06.**

**Top passers**

- CIN – Joe Burrow – 25/35, 232 yards, 2 TD, INT
- CLE – Jacoby Brissett – 17/22, 278 yards, TD

**Top rushers**

- CIN – Joe Mixon – 8 rushes, 27 yards
- CLE – Nick Chubb – 23 rushes, 101 yards, 2 TD

**Top receivers**

- CIN – Tee Higgins – 3 reception, 49 yards, TD
- CLE – Amari Cooper – 5 receptions, 131 yards, TD

The Browns returned home to take on the Cincinnati Bengals in the first round of this season's Battle of Ohio.

After a scoreless first quarter, Nick Chubb got the Browns on the board with a 3-yard touchdown run (and successful two-point conversion). A Cade York 55-yard field goal closed out an otherwise quiet first half with the Browns holding an 11–0 lead. The Browns expanded their lead to 25–0 in the third quarter on a Jacoby Brissett touchdown run and a Brissett touchdown pass to Amari Cooper. Cincinnati finally got on the board in the fourth quarter with a pair of Joe Burrow touchdown passes sandwiching Chubb's second touchdown run, but the Browns were able to win comfortably, 32–13.

With the win, the Browns entered their bye week at 3–5. This marked the Browns' fifth straight win over the Bengals, their longest winning streak in the series since a seven-game winning streak from 1992–1995.

==== Week 10: at Miami Dolphins ====
Week 10: Cleveland Browns at Miami Dolphins – Game summary

Quarter	1	2	3	4	Total
Browns	7	0	3	7	**17**
**Dolphins**	7	10	13	9	**39**

at Hard Rock Stadium, Miami Gardens, Florida

- Date: November 13
- Game time: 1:00 p.m. EST
- Game weather: Mostly sunny, 85 °F (29 °C)
- Game attendance: 66,563
- Referee: Shawn Hochuli
- TV announcers (CBS): Greg Gumbel, Adam Archuleta and AJ Ross
- Recap, Game Book

Game information

**First quarter**

- CLE – Harrison Bryant 1-yard pass from Jacoby Brissett (Cade York kick), 12:13. Browns 7–0. **Drive: 4 plays, 53 yards, 2:47.**
- MIA – Alec Ingold 13-yard pass from Tua Tagovailoa (Jason Sanders kick), 6:13. Tied 7–7. **Drive: 10 plays, 84 yards, 6:00.**

**Second quarter**

- MIA – Jason Sanders 39-yard field goal, 11:05. Dolphins 10–7. **Drive: 9 plays, 50 yards, 4:08.**
- MIA – Trent Sherfield 13-yard pass from Tua Tagovailoa (Jason Sanders kick), 0:32. Dolphins 17–7. **Drive: 7 plays, 53 yards, 0:50.**

**Third quarter**

- MIA – Raheem Mostert 24-yard run (Jason Sanders kick), 11:35. Dolphins 24–7. **Drive: 6 plays, 70 yards, 3:25.**
- CLE – Cade York 37-yard field goal, 6:56. Dolphins 24–10. **Drive: 11 plays, 56 yards, 4:39.**
- MIA – Tyreek Hill 2-yard pass from Tua Tagovailoa (kick failed), 0:37. Dolphins 30–10. **Drive: 13 plays, 77 yards, 6:19.**

**Fourth quarter**

- CLE – Nick Chubb 33-yard run (Cade York kick), 13:09. Dolphins 30–17. **Drive: 7 plays, 76 yards, 2:28.**
- MIA – Jason Sanders 33-yard field goal, 8:15. Dolphins 33–17. **Drive: 4 plays, 53 yards, 2:47.**
- MIA – Jeff Wilson 20-yard run (kick failed), 7:07. Dolphins 39–17. **Drive: 1 play, 20 yards, 0:06.**

**Top passers**

- CLE – Jacoby Brissett – 22/35, 212 yards, TD
- MIA – Tua Tagovailoa – 25/32, 285 yards, 3 TD

**Top rushers**

- CLE – Nick Chubb – 11 rushes, 63 yards, TD
- MIA – Jeff Wilson – 17 rushes, 119 yards, TD

**Top receivers**

- CLE – Donovan Peoples-Jones – 5 receptions, 99 yards
- MIA – Jaylen Waddle – 4 receptions, 66 yards

The Browns returned from their bye week with an away game against the Miami Dolphins, marking the return of quarterback Jacoby Brissett to Miami, where he played for the Dolphins the previous season.

The Browns scored on their opening drive with a Brissett touchdown pass to Harrison Bryant to take a 7–0 lead. However, Miami would score the next 24 points of the game on a pair of Tua Tagovailoa touchdown passes, a Raheem Mostert touchdown run, and a Jason Sanders field goal, taking a 24–7 lead early in the third quarter. The Browns moved the score to 30–17 on a Cade York field goal and a Nick Chubb 33-yard touchdown run sandwiching Tagovailoa's third touchdown pass of the day, however Miami put the game away in the fourth quarter with another field foal and a Jeff Wilson touchdown run, making the final score 39–17.

With the loss, the Browns fell to 3–6.

==== Week 11: at Buffalo Bills ====
Week 11: Cleveland Browns at Buffalo Bills – Game summary

Quarter	1	2	3	4	Total
Browns	7	3	0	13	**23**
**Bills**	3	10	9	9	**31**

at Ford Field, Detroit, Michigan

- Date: November 20
- Game time: 1:00 p.m. EST
- Game weather: None (indoor stadium)
- Game attendance: 52,146
- Referee: Adrian Hill
- TV announcers (CBS): Andrew Catalon, James Lofton and Amanda Renner
- Recap, Game Book

Game information

**First quarter**

- CLE – Amari Cooper 25-yard pass from Jacoby Brissett (Cade York kick), 9:02. Browns 7–0. **Drive: 9 plays, 75 yards, 5:58.**
- BUF – Tyler Bass 42-yard field goal, 3:32. Browns 7–3. **Drive: 4 plays, 8 yards, 1:44.**

**Second quarter**

- CLE – Cade York 32-yard field goal, 14:05. Browns 10–3. **Drive: 9 plays, 51 yards, 4:27.**
- BUF – Tyler Bass 36-yard field goal, 4:54. Browns 10–6. **Drive: 11 plays, 34 yards, 3:23.**
- BUF – Stefon Diggs 5-yard pass from Josh Allen (Tyler Bass kick), 0:14. Bills 13–10. **Drive: 11 plays, 78 yards, 1:40.**

**Third quarter**

- BUF – Tyler Bass 56-yard field goal, 9:42. Bills 16–10. **Drive: 8 plays, 36 yards, 5:18.**
- BUF – Devin Singletary 5-yard run (run failed), 4:08. Bills 22–10. **Drive: 4 play, 73 yards, 1:41.**

**Fourth quarter**

- BUF – Tyler Bass 49-yard field goal, 13:20. Bills 25–10. **Drive: 7 plays, 45 yards, 3:17.**
- BUF – Tyler Bass 28-yard field goal, 6:45. Bills 28–10. **Drive: 9 plays, 54 yards, 5:08.**
- CLE – Amari Cooper 7-yard pass from Jacoby Brissett (pass failed), 4:11. Bills 28–16. **Drive: 9 plays, 75 yards, 2:34.**
- BUF – Tyler Bass 39-yard field goal, 1:56. Bills 31–16. **Drive: 7 plays, 21 yards, 2:15.**
- CLE – Donovan Peoples-Jones 2-yard pass from Jacoby Brissett (Cade York kick), 0:19. Bills 31–23. **Drive: 8 plays, 75 yards, 1:37.**

**Top passers**

- CLE– Jacoby Brissett – 28/41, 324 yards, 3 TD
- BUF – Josh Allen – 18/27, 197 yards, TD

**Top rushers**

- CLE – Kareem Hunt – 5 rushes, 32 yards
- BUF – Devin Singletary – 18 rushes, 86 yards, TD

**Top receivers**

- CLE – Amari Cooper – 8 receptions, 113 yards, 2 TD
- BUF – Dawson Knox – 7 receptions, 70 yards

==== Week 12: vs. Tampa Bay Buccaneers ====
Week 12: Tampa Bay Buccaneers at Cleveland Browns – Game summary

Quarter	1	2	3	4	OT	Total
Buccaneers	7	3	7	0	0	**17**
**Browns**	10	0	0	7	6	**23**

at FirstEnergy Stadium, Cleveland, Ohio

- Date: November 27
- Game time: 1:00 p.m. EST
- Game weather: Rain, 56 °F (13 °C)
- Game attendance: 67,431
- Referee: Tra Blake
- TV announcers (Fox): Kenny Albert, Jonathan Vilma and Shannon Spake
- Recap, Game Book

Game information

**First quarter**

- CLE – Anthony Schwartz 31-yard run (Cade York kick), 10:45. Browns 7–0. **Drive: 7 plays, 78 yards, 4:15.**
- TB – Chris Godwin 10-yard pass from Tom Brady (Ryan Succop kick), 5:11. Tied 7–7. **Drive: 9 plays, 75 yards, 5:34.**
- CLE – Cade York 51-yard field goal, 2:22. Browns 10–7. **Drive: 7 plays, 42 yards, 2:49.**

**Second quarter**

- TB – Ryan Succop 42-yard field goal, 0:39. Tied 10–10. **Drive: 10 plays, 47 yards, 3:14.**

**Third quarter**

- TB – Ko Kieft 5-yard pass from Tom Brady (Ryan Succop kick), 7:41. Buccaneers 17–10. **Drive: 7 plays, 80 yards, 3:48.**

**Fourth quarter**

- CLE – David Njoku 12-yard pass from Jacoby Brissett (Cade York kick), 0:32. Tied 17–17. **Drive: 6 play, 46 yards, 1:38.**

**Overtime**

- CLE – Nick Chubb 3-yard run, 0:32. Browns 23–17. **Drive: 6 plays, 71 yards, 2:26.**

**Top passers**

- TB – Tom Brady – 29/43, 246 yards, 2 TD
- CLE – Jacoby Brissett – 23/37, 210 yards, TD, INT

**Top rushers**

- TB – Rachaad White – 14 rushes, 64 yards
- CLE – Nick Chubb – 26 rushes, 116 yards, TD

**Top receivers**

- TB – Chris Godwin – 12 receptions, 110 yards, TD
- CLE – Amari Cooper – 7 receptions, 94 yards

==== Week 13: at Houston Texans ====
Week 13: Cleveland Browns at Houston Texans – Game summary

Quarter	1	2	3	4	Total
**Browns**	0	7	7	13	**27**
Texans	3	2	3	6	**14**

at NRG Stadium, Houston, Texas

- Date: December 4
- Game time: 1:00 p.m. EST/12:00 p.m. CST
- Game weather: None (retractable roof closed)
- Game attendance: 66,523
- Referee: Land Clark
- TV announcers (CBS): Spero Dedes, Jay Feely and Aditi Kinkhabwala
- Recap, Game Book

Game information

**First quarter**

- HOU – Kaʻimi Fairbairn 44-yard field goal, 8:02. Texans 3–0. **Drive: 8 plays, 13 yards, 3:51.**

**Second quarter**

- HOU – Nick Chubb tackled in end zone by Roy Lopez, 11:53. Texans 5–0.
- CLE – Donovan Peoples-Jones 76-yard punt return (Cade York kick), 3:41. Browns 7–5.

**Third quarter**

- CLE – Denzel Ward 4-yard fumble return (Cade York kick), 10:10. Browns 14–5.
- HOU – Kaʻimi Fairbairn 35-yard field goal, 5:08. Browns 14–8. **Drive: 7 plays, 59 yards, 5:02.**

**Fourth quarter**

- CLE – Cade York 43-yard field goal, 9:36. Browns 17–8. **Drive: 11 plays, 42 yards, 5:58.**
- CLE – Tony Fields II 16-yard interception return (Cade York kick), 9:30. Browns 24–8.
- CLE – Cade York 42-yard field goal, 4:03. Browns 27–8. **Drive: 4 plays, 8 yards, 1:26.**
- HOU – Nico Collins 6-yard pass from Kyle Allen (pass failed), 1:57. Browns 27–14. **Drive: 7 plays, 75 yards, 2:06.**

**Top passers**

- CLE – Deshaun Watson – 12/22, 131 yards, INT
- HOU – Kyle Allen – 20/39, 201 yards, TD, 2 INT

**Top rushers**

- CLE – Nick Chubb – 17 rushes, 80 yards
- HOU – Dameon Pierce – 18 rushes, 73 yards

**Top receivers**

- CLE – Donovan Peoples-Jones – 3 receptions, 44 yards
- HOU – Chris Moore – 3 receptions, 46 yards

Deshaun Watson made his first start for the Browns against his former team in the Texans, returning after completing his suspension. Despite a lackluster performance from Watson and the offense as a whole, the Browns still won handily 27–14 thanks to two defensive touchdowns and a punt return touchdown.

==== Week 14: at Cincinnati Bengals ====
Week 14: Cleveland Browns at Cincinnati Bengals – Game summary

Quarter	1	2	3	4	Total
Browns	0	3	7	0	**10**
**Bengals**	0	13	7	3	**23**

at Paycor Stadium, Cincinnati, Ohio

- Date: December 11
- Game time: 1:00 p.m. EST
- Game weather: Mostly cloudy, 48 °F (9 °C)
- Game attendance: 66,222
- Referee: Jerome Boger
- TV announcers (CBS): Greg Gumbel, Adam Archuleta and AJ Ross
- Recap, Game Book

Game information

**First quarter**

- No scoring plays.

**Second quarter**

- CIN – Ja'Marr Chase 15-yard pass from Joe Burrow (Evan McPherson kick), 9:43. Bengals 7–0. **Drive: 9 plays, 85 yards, 5:03.**
- CLE – Cade York 26-yard field goal, 2:59. Bengals 7–3. **Drive: 13 plays, 63 yards, 6:44.**
- CIN – Samaje Perine 6-yard run (kick failed), 0:24. Bengals 13–3. **Drive: 9 plays, 75 yards, 2:35.**

**Third quarter**

- CIN – Trenton Irwin 45-yard pass from Joe Burrow (Evan McPherson kick), 7:26. Bengals 20–3. **Drive: 2 plays, 56 yards, 0:44.**
- CLE – David Njoku 13-yard pass from Deshaun Watson (Cade York kick), 2:17. Bengals 20–10. **Drive: 10 plays, 71 yards, 5:09.**

**Fourth quarter**

- CIN – Evan McPherson 30-yard field goal, 14:57. Bengals 23–10. **Drive: 6 plays, 63 yards, 2:20.**

**Top passers**

- CLE – Deshaun Watson – 26/42, 276 yards, TD, INT
- CIN – Joe Burrow – 18/33, 239 yards, 2 TD, INT

**Top rushers**

- CLE – Nick Chubb – 14 rushes, 34 yards
- CIN – Joe Mixon – 14 rushes, 96 yards

**Top receivers**

- CLE – Donovan Peoples-Jones – 8 receptions, 114 yards
- CIN – Ja'Marr Chase – 10 receptions, 119 yards, TD

==== Week 15: vs. Baltimore Ravens ====
Week 15: Baltimore Ravens at Cleveland Browns – Game summary

Quarter	1	2	3	4	Total
Ravens	0	3	0	0	**3**
**Browns**	0	6	7	0	**13**

at FirstEnergy Stadium, Cleveland, Ohio

- Date: December 17
- Game time: 4:30 p.m. EST
- Game weather: Cloudy, 32 °F (0 °C)
- Game attendance: 67,431
- Referee: Brad Allen
- TV announcers (NFL Network): Rich Eisen, Kurt Warner, Steve Wyche and Stacey Dales
- Recap, Game Book

Game information

**First quarter**

- No scoring plays.

**Second quarter**

- CLE – Cade York 47-yard field goal, 14:10. Browns 3–0. **Drive: 14 plays, 64 yards, 7:42.**
- BAL – Justin Tucker 53-yard field goal, 5:31. Tied 3–3. **Drive: 9 plays, 27 yards, 4:26.**
- CLE – Cade York 23-yard field goal, 1:52. Browns 6–3. **Drive: 11 plays, 71 yards, 3:39.**

**Third quarter**

- CLE – Donovan Peoples-Jones 3-yard pass from Deshaun Watson (Cade York kick), 2:10. Browns 13–3. **Drive: 12 plays, 91 yards, 6:08.**

**Fourth quarter**

- No scoring plays.

**Top passers**

- BAL – Tyler Huntley – 17/30, 138 yards, INT
- CLE – Deshaun Watson – 18/28, 161 yards, TD

**Top rushers**

- BAL – J. K. Dobbins – 13 rushes, 125 yards
- CLE – Nick Chubb – 21 rushes, 99 yards

**Top receivers**

- BAL – Mark Andrews – 3 receptions, 31 yards
- CLE – Amari Cooper – 4 receptions, 58 yards

With the win, the Browns improved to 6–8. This marked the Browns' 500th win as a member of the NFL.

==== Week 16: vs. New Orleans Saints ====
Week 16: New Orleans Saints at Cleveland Browns – Game summary

Quarter	1	2	3	4	Total
**Saints**	0	3	14	0	**17**
Browns	0	10	0	0	**10**

at FirstEnergy Stadium, Cleveland, Ohio

- Date: December 24
- Game time: 1:00 p.m. EST
- Game weather: Frigid, 6 °F (−14 °C)
- Game attendance: 67,431
- Referee: Brad Rogers
- TV announcers (CBS): Spero Dedes, Jay Feely and Aditi Kinkhabwala
- Recap, Game Book

Game information

**First quarter**

- No scoring plays.

**Second quarter**

- CLE – Deshaun Watson 12-yard run (Cade York kick), 14:55. Browns 7–0. **Drive: 5 plays, 30 yards, 2:49.**
- CLE – Cade York 30-yard field goal, 4:07. Browns 10–0. **Drive: 17 plays, 60 yards, 8:44.**
- NO – Wil Lutz 23-yard field goal, 0:00. Browns 10–3. **Drive: 10 plays, 68 yards, 4:07.**

**Third quarter**

- NO – Taysom Hill 8-yard run (Wil Lutz kick), 9:40. Tied 10–10. **Drive: 9 plays, 67 yards, 5:20.**
- NO – Alvin Kamara 4-yard run (Wil Lutz kick), 0:55. Saints 17–10. **Drive: 4 plays, 15 yards, 2:00.**

**Fourth quarter**

- No scoring plays.

**Top passers**

- NO – Andy Dalton – 8/15, 92 yards, INT
- CLE – Deshaun Watson – 15/31, 135 yards, INT

**Top rushers**

- NO – Alvin Kamara – 20 rushes, 76 yards, TD
- CLE – Nick Chubb – 24 rushes, 92 yards

**Top receivers**

- NO – Rashid Shaheed – 4 receptions, 41 yards
- CLE – Amari Cooper – 6 receptions, 72 yards

With the loss, the Browns fell to 6–9 and were eliminated from playoff contention. The Browns finished 4–4 at home.

==== Week 17: at Washington Commanders ====
Week 17: Cleveland Browns at Washington Commanders – Game summary

Quarter	1	2	3	4	Total
**Browns**	3	0	14	7	**24**
Commanders	0	7	0	3	**10**

at FedExField, Landover, Maryland

- Date: January 1
- Game time: 1:00 p.m. EST
- Game weather: Sunny, 62 °F (17 °C)
- Game attendance: 50,827
- Referee: Bill Vinovich
- TV announcers (Fox): Adam Amin, Mark Schlereth and Kristina Pink
- Recap, Game Book

Game information

**First quarter**

- CLE – Cade York 37-yard field goal, 9:22. Browns 3–0. **Drive: 5 plays, 17 yards, 1:26.**

**Second quarter**

- WAS – Carson Wentz 1-yard run (Joey Slye kick), 0:21. Commanders 7–3. **Drive: 21 plays, 96 yards, 11:27.**

**Third quarter**

- CLE – Amari Cooper 46-yard pass from Deshaun Watson (Cade York kick), 10:03. Browns 10–7. **Drive: 6 plays, 63 yards, 2:50.**
- CLE – Donovan Peoples-Jones 13-yard pass from Deshaun Watson (Cade York kick), 0:36. Browns 17–7. **Drive: 12 plays, 84 yards, 6:20.**

**Fourth quarter**

- WAS – Joey Slye 43-yard field goal, 10:26. Browns 17–10. **Drive: 9 plays, 50 yards, 5:10.**
- CLE – Amari Cooper 33-yard pass from Deshaun Watson (Cade York kick), 5:21. Browns 24–10. **Drive: 9 plays, 75 yards, 5:05.**

**Top passers**

- CLE – Deshaun Watson – 9/18, 169 yards, 3 TD
- WAS – Carson Wentz – 16/28, 143 yards, 3 INT

**Top rushers**

- CLE – Nick Chubb – 14 rushes, 104 yards
- WAS – Brian Robinson Jr. – 24 rushes, 87 yards

**Top receivers**

- CLE – Amari Cooper – 3 receptions, 105 yards, 2 TD
- WAS – Logan Thomas – 6 receptions, 56 yards

Coming off a tough loss and playoff elimination, the Browns visited the Washington Commanders. Cleveland opened the scoring on a Cade York 37-yard field goal. In the second quarter, Washington went on a 21-play, 96-yard drive culminating in a Carson Wentz touchdown run. The Browns took control in the third quarter as Deshaun Watson threw touchdown passes to Amari Cooper and Donovan Peoples-Jones to take a 17–7 lead. A Joey Slye field goal for Washington cut the lead to 17–10, but Cleveland responded with another touchdown pass from Watson to Cooper to extend their lead to 24–10, which would be the final score.

With the win, the Browns improved to 7–9. Punter Corey Bojorquez was named the AFC Special Teams Player of the Week after making four punts for 187 yards (46.8 avg.), including two punts downed within the Washington 5-yard line.

==== Week 18: at Pittsburgh Steelers ====
Week 18: Cleveland Browns at Pittsburgh Steelers – Game summary

Quarter	1	2	3	4	Total
Browns	0	7	0	7	**14**
**Steelers**	0	10	10	8	**28**

at Acrisure Stadium, Pittsburgh, Pennsylvania

- Date: January 8
- Game time: 1:00 p.m. EST
- Game weather: Partly cloudy, 39 °F (4 °C)
- Game attendance: 65,019
- Referee: Clete Blakeman
- TV announcers (CBS): Greg Gumbel, Adam Archuleta and AJ Ross
- Recap, Game Book

Game information

**First quarter**

- No scoring plays.

**Second quarter**

- CLE – David Njoku 10-yard pass from Deshaun Watson (Cade York kick), 6:27. Browns 7–0. **Drive: 10 plays, 71 yards, 4:57.**
- PIT – George Pickens 31-yard pass from Kenny Pickett (Chris Boswell kick), 1:47. Tied 7–7. **Drive: 9 plays, 75 yards, 4:40.**
- PIT – Chris Boswell 49-yard field goal, 0:38. Steelers 10–7. **Drive: 6 plays, 25 yards, 0:33.**

**Third quarter**

- PIT – Chris Boswell 34-yard field goal, 9:04. Steelers 13–7. **Drive: 12 plays, 59 yards, 5:56.**
- PIT – Najee Harris 4-yard run (Chris Boswell kick), 3:12. Steelers 20–7. **Drive: 6 plays, 25 yards, 2:30.**

**Fourth quarter**

- CLE – Nick Chubb 2-yard pass from Deshaun Watson (Cade York kick), 10:11. Steelers 20–14. **Drive: 7 plays, 77 yards, 4:38.**
- PIT – Derek Watt 1-yard run (Kenny Pickett-Diontae Johnson pass), 4:37. Steelers 28–14. **Drive: 14 plays, 75 yards, 5:34.**

**Top passers**

- CLE – Deshaun Watson – 19/29, 230 yards, 2 TD, 2 INT
- PIT – Kenny Pickett – 13/29, 195 yards, TD

**Top rushers**

- CLE – Nick Chubb – 12 rushes, 77 yards
- PIT – Najee Harris – 23 rushes, 84 yards, TD

**Top receivers**

- CLE – Amari Cooper – 2 receptions, 51 yards
- PIT – George Pickens – 3 receptions, 72 yards, TD

The Browns finished the season with a trip to Pittsburgh, hoping to sweep the Steelers for the first time since 1988. The Steelers entered the game with distant playoff hopes, but would need a win and multiple other teams in the playoff hunt to lose their games.

After a scoreless first quarter, the Browns struck first when Deshaun Watson found David Njoku on a 10-yard touchdown pass to make it 7–0. However, Pittsburgh would score the next 20 points in the game on a Kenny Pickett touchdown pass to George Pickens, a pair of Chris Boswell field goals, and a Najee Harris touchdown run to take a 20–7 lead. The Browns closed the gap to one score at 20–14 on a Watson touchdown pass to Nick Chubb, but could not come any closer. A late Pittsburgh touchdown made the final score 28–14.

With the loss, the Browns finished the season 7–10. This marked the Browns' 19th straight regular-season loss in Pittsburgh. The Browns finished 3–6 in away games.

=== Standings ===
==== Division ====
AFC North
	W	L	T	PCT	DIV	CONF	PF	PA	STK
^{(3)} Cincinnati Bengals	12	4	0	.750	3–3	8–3	418	322	W8
^{(6)} Baltimore Ravens	10	7	0	.588	3–3	6–6	350	315	L2
Pittsburgh Steelers	9	8	0	.529	3–3	5–7	308	346	W4
Cleveland Browns	7	10	0	.412	3–3	4–8	361	381	L1

==== Conference ====
AFC
#	Team	Division	W	L	T	PCT	DIV	CONF	SOS	SOV	STK
**Division leaders**
1	Kansas City Chiefs	West	14	3	0	.824	6–0	9–3	.453	.422	W5
2	Buffalo Bills	East	13	3	0	.813	4–2	9–2	.489	.471	W7
3	Cincinnati Bengals	North	12	4	0	.750	3–3	8–3	.507	.490	W8
4	Jacksonville Jaguars	South	9	8	0	.529	4–2	8–4	.467	.438	W5
**Wild cards**
5 (Note: LA Chargers claimed the No. 5 seed over Baltimore based on conference record (7–5 vs. 6–6).)	Los Angeles Chargers	West	10	7	0	.588	2–4	7–5	.443	.341	L1
6	Baltimore Ravens	North	10	7	0	.588	3–3	6–6	.509	.456	L2
7 (Note: Miami finished ahead of Pittsburgh based on head-to-head victory, claiming the 7th and final playoff spot.)	Miami Dolphins	East	9	8	0	.529	3–3	7–5	.537	.457	W1
**Did not qualify for the postseason**
8	Pittsburgh Steelers	North	9	8	0	.529	3–3	5–7	.519	.451	W4
9	New England Patriots	East	8	9	0	.471	3–3	6–6	.502	.415	L1
10 (Note: NY Jets and Tennessee finished ahead of Cleveland based on conference record (5–7 vs. 4–8).) (Note: NY Jets finished ahead of Tennessee based on common record (3–3 vs. 2–4 against: Buffalo, Cincinnati, Denver, Green Bay, Jacksonville).)	New York Jets	East	7	10	0	.412	2–4	5–7	.538	.458	L6
11	Tennessee Titans	South	7	10	0	.412	3–3	5–7	.509	.336	L7
12	Cleveland Browns	North	7	10	0	.412	3–3	4–8	.524	.492	L1
13	Las Vegas Raiders	West	6	11	0	.353	3–3	5–7	.474	.397	L3
14	Denver Broncos	West	5	12	0	.294	1–5	3–9	.481	.465	W1
15	Indianapolis Colts	South	4	12	1	.265	1–4–1	4–7–1	.512	.500	L7
16	Houston Texans	South	3	13	1	.206	3–2–1	3–8–1	.481	.402	W1
**Tiebreakers** (Note: When breaking ties for three or more teams under the NFL's rules, they are first broken within divisions, then comparing only the highest ranked remaining team from each division.)

=== Team leaders ===
==== Regular season ====
Category	Player(s)	Value
Passing yards	Jacoby Brissett	2,608
Passing touchdowns	Jacoby Brissett	12
Rushing yards	Nick Chubb	1,525
Rushing touchdowns	Nick Chubb	12
Receptions	Amari Cooper	78
Receiving yards	Amari Cooper	1,160
Receiving touchdowns	Amari Cooper	9
Points	Cade York	107
Kickoff return yards	Jerome Ford	723
Punt return yards	Donovan Peoples-Jones	223
Tackles	Grant Delpit	105
Sacks	Myles Garrett	16.0
Forced fumbles	3 players tied	2
Interceptions	Grant Delpit	4
Pass deflections	2 players tied	15
