= Martin Emerson =

American football player (born 2000)

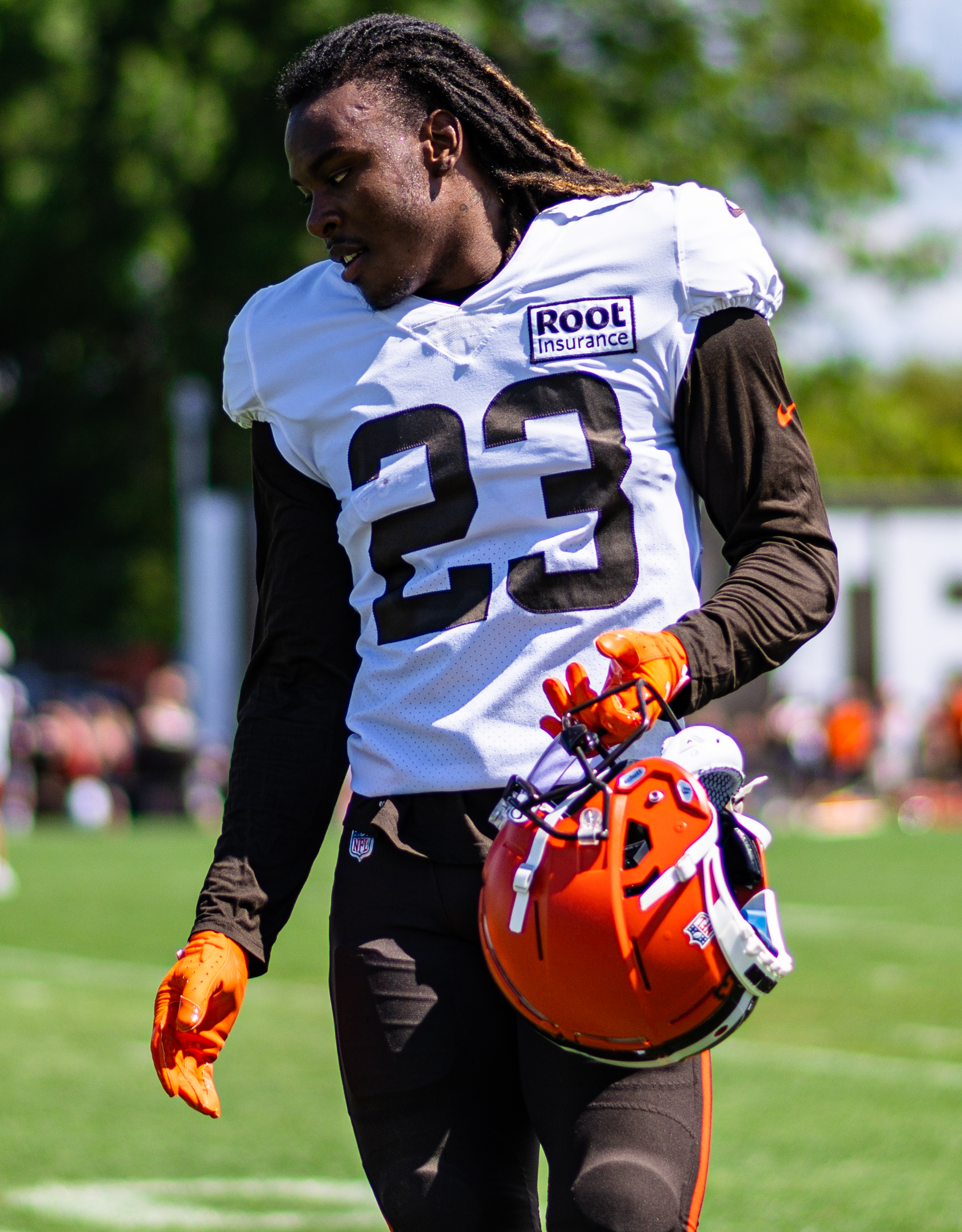
- Emerson with the Cleveland Browns in 2022

No. 22 – New Orleans Saints
- Position: Cornerback
- Roster status: Active

Personal information
- Born: September 27, 2000 (age 26); Pensacola, Florida, U.S.
- Listed height: 6 ft 2 in (1.88 m)
- Listed weight: 201 lb (91 kg)

Career information
- High school: Pine Forest (Pensacola)
- College: Mississippi State (2019–2021)
- NFL draft: 2022: 3rd round, 68th overall pick

Career history
- Cleveland Browns (2022–2025); New Orleans Saints (2026–present)

Awards and highlights
- PFF third-team All-SEC (2021)

Career NFL statistics as of Week 10, 2026
- Total tackles: 223
- Sacks: 1.0
- Forced fumbles: 2
- Fumble recoveries: 1
- Pass deflections: 38
- Interceptions: 6
- Stats at Pro Football Reference

Martin "MJ" Emerson Jr. (born September 27, 2000) is an American professional football cornerback for the New Orleans Saints of the National Football League (NFL). He was selected by the Cleveland Browns in the third round of the 2022 NFL draft. He played college football for the Mississippi State Bulldogs.

== Early life ==
Emerson grew up in Pensacola, Florida and attended Pine Forest High School. As a senior, he had 91 tackles and two tackles for loss with four passes broken up, one interception, one forced fumble, and two fumble recoveries. Emerson was rated a three-star recruit and committed to play college football at Mississippi State over offers from Miami, Oregon and Ole Miss.

== College career ==
Emerson played in all 13 of Mississippi State's games with five starts in his freshman season. As a sophomore, he had 72 total tackles and Southeastern Conference-high 11 pass breakups. Pro Football Focus rated Emerson the seventh-best cornerback in coverage in the nation and named him an honorable mention All-American.

== Professional career ==
=== Pre-draft ===
Cory Giddings of Bleacher Report ranked Emerson 7th amongst all cornerback prospects in the draft (60th overall) and projected him to be selected in the second round of the 2022 NFL Draft. Kevin Hanson of Sports Illustrated and Thor Nystrom of NBC Sports ranked Emerson as the 11th best cornerback prospect in the draft. Scouts Inc. listed Emerson as the 16th best cornerback prospect (112th overall) on their big board. NFL.com media analyst Daniel Jeremiah listed Emerson 20th amongst all cornerbacks in the draft (125th overall). NFL media analyst Lance Zierlein projected him to be drafted in the third or fourth round.

Pre-draft measurables
| Height | Weight | Arm length | Hand span | Wingspan | 40-yard dash | 10-yard split | 20-yard split | 20-yard shuttle | Three-cone drill | Vertical jump | Broad jump | Bench press |
|---|---|---|---|---|---|---|---|---|---|---|---|---|
| 6 ft 1 5/8 in (1.87 m) | 201 lb (91 kg) | 33 1/2 in (0.85 m) | 10 1/8 in (0.26 m) | 6 ft 7 1/2 in (2.02 m) | 4.52 s | 1.59 s | 2.56 s | 4.14 s | 6.90 s | 32.0 in (0.81 m) | 10 ft 4 in (3.15 m) | 17 reps |
All values from NFL Combine/Pro Day

=== Cleveland Browns ===
==== 2022 ====
The Cleveland Browns selected Emerson in the third round (68th overall) of the 2022 NFL draft. The Browns received this pick in a trade with the Houston Texans where they agreed to send their 2022 third- (68th overall) and two fourth-round selections (108th and 124th overall) in return for a third round pick (44th overall). He was the tenth cornerback drafted. The following day, the Browns traded cornerback Troy Hill to the Los Angeles Rams.

External videos
- Browns select Martin Emerson No. 68
- Martin Emerson heard from the Browns

"We do not strictly look at how many interceptions he had or how many pass breakups he had only, but you look at the full body of work, how he goes about covering, utilizing his instincts and all of the different components to being a DB."

— Glenn Cook (Browns' VP of Player Personnel)

On May 12, 2022, the Browns signed Emerson to a four–year, $5.41 million rookie contract that includes an initial signing bonus of $1.15 million.

Throughout training camp, he competed to be the third cornerback on the depth chart against A. J. Green and Greedy Williams. Following the departure of Troy Hill, defensive coordinator Joe Woods was tasked with replacing Hill at slot cornerback. In nickel packages, requiring five defensive backs, Woods elected to move No. 2 starting cornerback Greg Newsome II to cover the slot with Emerson replacing him at his usual position as an outside cornerback. Head coach Kevin Stefanski named Emerson the third cornerback on the depth chart to begin the regular season, behind starting cornerbacks Denzel Ward and Greg Newsome II.

On September 11, 2022, Emerson made his professional regular season debut during the Cleveland Browns' season–opener at the Carolina Panthers and recorded five combined tackles (four solo) in their 26–24 victory. In Week 6, Emerson earned his first career start after Denzel Ward sustained a concussion against the Los Angeles Chargers the previous week. He recorded six solo tackles and two pass deflections during a 38–15 loss to the New England Patriots. The following week, he recorded four solo tackles and made his first career sack on quarterback Lamar Jackson for a seven–yard loss during a 23–20 loss at the Baltimore Ravens in Week 7. On October 31, 2022, he set a season-high with nine combined tackles (six solo) and made two pass deflections as the Browns defeated the Cincinnati Bengals 32–13. In Week 12, Emerson recorded four combined tackles (three solo) and set a season-high with four pass deflections during a 23–17 overtime victory against the Tampa Bay Buccaneers. He finished his rookie season in 2022 with a total of 63 combined tackles (51 solo), 15 pass deflections, and one sack in 17 games and six starts. He received an overall grade of 72.5 from Pro Football Focus as a rookie in 2022.

==== 2023 ====
On January 18, 2023, the Cleveland Browns hired Jim Schwartz to be their new defensive coordinator after firing Joe Woods the previous week. He returned to training camp slated as a backup. Head coach Kevin Stefanski listed him as the No. 3 cornerback on the depth chart to begin the season, behind starters Denzel Ward and Greg Newsome.

On October 15, 2023, Emerson recorded six solo tackles, made two pass deflections, and had his first career interception on a pass attempt thrown by Brock Purdy to wide receiver Brandon Aiyuk as the Browns won 19–17 against the San Francisco 49ers. Beginning in Week 9, Emerson started nine consecutive games, including six games in nickel packages and three games as an outside corner in the absence of Denzel Ward who injured his shoulder. In Week 10, he set a season-high with eight combined tackles (six solo) during a 33–31 victory at the Baltimore Ravens. On December 10, 2023, Emerson made four solo tackles, three pass deflections, and set a season-high with two interceptions off pass attempts thrown by Trevor Lawrence as the Browns defeated the Jacksonville Jaguars 31–27. He was inactive as a healthy scratch in Week 18 as head coach Kevin Stefanski chose to rest as many starters as possible in preparation for the playoffs. He finished the season with 59 combined tackles (45 solo), 14 pass deflections, and a career-high four interceptions in 16 games and 12 starts. He received an overall grade of 65.3 from Pro Football Focus in 2023.

The Cleveland Browns completed the 2023 NFL season with a second place finish in the AFC North with an 11–7 record to clinch a Wild-Card berth. On January 13, 2024, Emerson started in his first career playoff game, earning the starting role over Greg Newsome, and made two solo tackles as the Browns lost 45–14 at the Houston Texans in the AFC Wild-Card Game.

==== 2024 ====
Throughout training camp, he battled Greg Newsome II for the role as the No. 2 starting cornerback. Head coach Kevin Stefanski named him the No. 2 starting cornerback to begin the season and paired him with Denzel Ward. On September 8, 2024, Emerson started in the Cleveland Browns' home-opener against the Dallas Cowboys and set a season-high with eight combined tackles (five solo) and made one pass deflection as they lost 33–17. In Week 7, he recorded six combined tackles (five solo) and set a season-high with two pass deflections during a 20–16 loss at the Las Vegas Raiders. He finished the 2024 NFL season with a career-high 82 combined tackles (62 solo) and had five pass deflections, while appearing in all 17 games with 15 starts. The two games Emerson was not credited with a start was due to the Browns beginning the game with a 4–4–3 defense that only necessitated one cornerback. He received an overall grade of 47.9 from Pro Football Focus, which ranked 194th amongst 222 qualifying cornerbacks in 2024.

==== 2025 ====
On July 29, 2025, Emerson suffered a season-ending Achilles tear during training camp.

=== New Orleans Saints ===
On April 28, 2026, Emerson signed a one-year contract with the New Orleans Saints. Emerson won NFC Defensive Player of the Week for Week 6 after seven combined tackles, two interceptions, four passes defensed, one pressure and one tackle in a win against the New York Giants.

== NFL career statistics ==
Legend
| **Bold** | Career high |

| Year | Team | Games | | Tackles | | | | Interceptions | | | | | | Fumbles | | | |
| Year | Team | G | GS | Comb | Total | Ast | Sack | PD | Int | Yds | Avg | Lng | TD | FF | FR | Yds | TD |
|---|---|---|---|---|---|---|---|---|---|---|---|---|---|---|---|---|---|
| 2022 | CLE | 17 | 6 | 63 | 51 | 12 | **1.0** | **15** | 0 | 0 | 0.0 | 0 | 0 | 0 | 0 | 0 | 0 |
| 2023 | CLE | 16 | 12 | 59 | 45 | 14 | 0.0 | 14 | **4** | **24** | **6.0** | **13** | 0 | 0 | 0 | 0 | 0 |
| 2024 | CLE | 17 | 15 | **80** | **62** | **18** | 0.0 | 5 | 0 | 0 | 0.0 | 0 | 0 | **1** | **1** | **2** | 0 |
| 2025 | CLE | 0 | 0 | DNP | | | | | | | | | | | | | |
| 2026 | NOR | 8 | 3 | 21 | 18 | 3 | 0.0 | 4 | 2 | 19 | 9.5 | 12 | 0 | **1** | 0 | 0 | 0 |
| Total | | 58 | 36 | 223 | 176 | 47 | 1.0 | 38 | 6 | 43 | 7.7 | 13 | 0 | 2 | 1 | 2 | 0 |
