= Greg Newsome II =

American football player (born 2000)

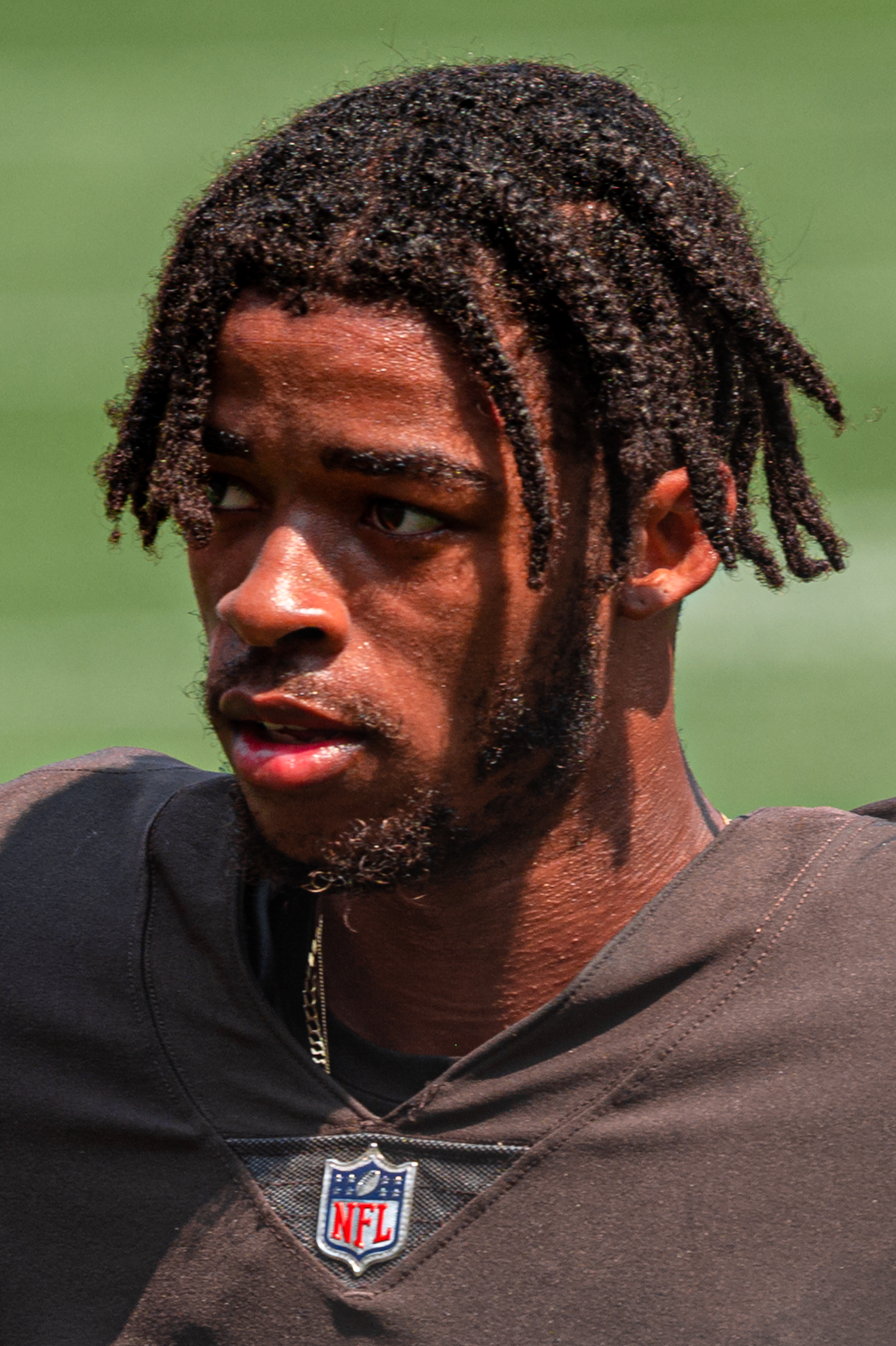
- Newsome II with the Cleveland Browns in 2021

No. 20 – New York Giants
- Position: Cornerback
- Roster status: Active

Personal information
- Born: May 18, 2000 (age 26); Chicago, Illinois, U.S.
- Listed height: 6 ft 0 in (1.83 m)
- Listed weight: 192 lb (87 kg)

Career information
- High school: IMG Academy (Bradenton, Florida)
- College: Northwestern (2018–2020)
- NFL draft: 2021: 1st round, 26th overall pick

Career history
- Cleveland Browns (2021–2025); Jacksonville Jaguars (2025); New York Giants (2026–present)

Awards and highlights
- PFWA All-Rookie Team (2021); Second-team All-American (2020); First-team All-Big Ten (2020)

Career NFL statistics as of Week 5, 2026
- Total tackles: 229
- Sacks: 1
- Pass deflections: 48
- Interceptions: 5
- Defensive touchdowns: 1
- Stats at Pro Football Reference

Gregory Newsome II (born May 18, 2000) is an American professional football cornerback for the New York Giants of the National Football League (NFL). He played college football for the Northwestern Wildcats and was selected by the Cleveland Browns in the first round of the 2021 NFL draft. He has also played in the NFL for the Jacksonville Jaguars.

== Early life ==
Newsome attended Glenbard North High School in Carol Stream, Illinois before transferring to IMG Academy in Bradenton, Florida for his senior year. He committed to Northwestern University to play college football.

== College career ==
Newsome recorded 71 tackles and one interception over three years at Northwestern. He started 18 games and led the Wildcats to two Big Ten title games. As a junior in 2020, he was named an All-American by The Athletic. After that season, he entered the 2021 NFL draft.

== Professional career ==
=== Pre-draft ===
Pro Football Focus ranked Newsome as the third best cornerback prospect (20th overall) in the draft. Dane Brugler of The Athletic and Mark Schofield of Touchdown Wire had Newsome ranked as the fourth best cornerback prospect. NFL analyst Daniel Jeremiah had Newsome ranked fourth among all cornerbacks (28th overall). Mel Kiper Jr. of ESPN had him as the fourth best cornerback (21st overall). Rob Rang of Fox Sports had Newsome ranked as the fourth cornerback prospect (27th overall). The majority of NFL draft analysts projected him to be drafted in the late first-round or possibly the second-round.

Pre-draft measurables
Height	Weight	Arm length	Hand span	Wingspan	40-yard dash	10-yard split	20-yard split	20-yard shuttle	Three-cone drill	Vertical jump	Broad jump	Bench press
6 ft 0 in (1.83 m)	192 lb (87 kg)	31 1/8 in (0.79 m)	8 7/8 in (0.23 m)	6 ft 1 3/4 in (1.87 m)	4.38 s	1.50 s	2.53 s	4.26 s	6.90 s	40.0 in (1.02 m)	10 ft 3 in (3.12 m)	18 reps
All values from Pro Day

=== Cleveland Browns ===
==== 2021 ====
The Cleveland Browns selected Newsome in the first round (26th overall) of the 2021 NFL draft. Newsome's pick marked the first time Northwestern has had two first-round picks in the NFL draft after Rashawn Slater was taken 13th overall. He was the fourth cornerback taken in the draft.

"He was one of the guys that we targeted throughout the draft process. I think he fits really our profile for the Cleveland Browns. He was a player who was really a multi-year producer in a Power 5 conference. Great physical talent. He is one of the youngest guys in the draft class, despite how much he accomplished at the college level, and he fits the smart tough accountable profile that we want out of our players that we really bring in the building. We are excited to add him to the team. One of the things that appealed to us about Greg was that we thought he was one of the more well-rounded corners in the class. Obviously, he has the size, length and speed that probably every team wants at the position, but he is a guy who can play press effectively. They played a heavy dose of zone and off man at Northwestern, which he was able to do effectively and he makes plays on the ball. And even then, he is tough and runs, of course. So, what we liked is that from our perspective, there was not a major discernible hole within his skill set and he has a high level of competency across all areas that we value at the cornerback position."

— Andrew Berry, Browns general manager

External videos
- Browns draft Greg Newsome II No. 26

On July 24, 2021, the Cleveland Browns signed Newsome to a four–year, $12.74 million contract that is fully guaranteed upon signing and includes an initial signing bonus of $6.63 million. Entering training camp, Newsome was slated to be a starting cornerback, replacing Terrance Mitchell. Head coach Kevin Stefanski named Newsome and Denzel Ward the starting cornerbacks to start the regular season.

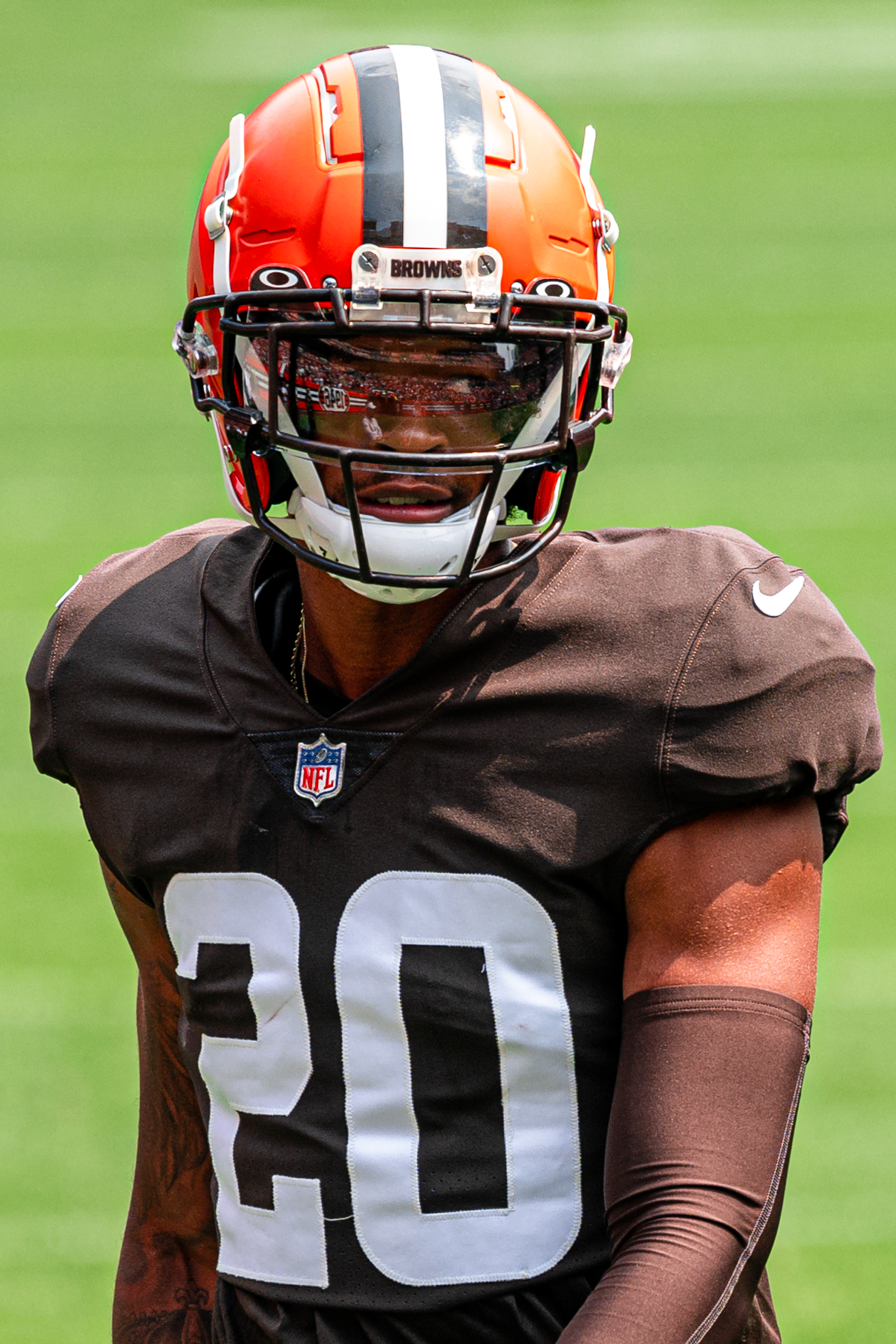
Newsome with the Cleveland Browns in 2021

On September 12, 2021, Newsome started in his professional regular season debut and had one solo tackle during a 29–32 loss at the Kansas City Chiefs. He was inactive for two consecutive games (Weeks 4–5) after injuring his calf. In Week 9, he recorded five solo tackles and had a season-high three pass deflections during a 41–16 win at the Cincinnati Bengals. On December 10, 2021, Newsome suffered a concussion after hitting his head during the last play of a practice and was subsequently sidelined for three games (Weeks 14–16). On January 3, 2022, he racked up a season-high eight combined tackles (seven solo) and deflected two passes as the Browns lost 14–26 at the Pittsburgh Steelers. He finished his rookie season in 2021 with a total of 37 combined tackles (33 solo) and nine pass deflections in 12 games and 11 starts. He was named to the PFWA All-Rookie Team. He received an overall grade of 68.1 from Pro Football Focus in 2021. His coverage grade from PFF was 70.6 during his rookie season.

==== 2022 ====
Defensive coordinator Joe Woods retained Newsome and Denzel Ward as the starting cornerback duo at the start of the regular season. On November 13, 2022, Newsome made three combined tackles (two solo) and made his first career sack on wide receiver Cedrick Wilson Jr. with teammate Deion Jones for a six–yard loss during a 17–39 loss at the Miami Dolphins. He was sidelined for two games (Weeks 13–14) after sustaining a concussion in practice. In Week 14, Newsome collected a season–high six combined tackles (three solo) in the Browns' 10–23 loss at the Cincinnati Bengals. In the 2022 NFL season, Newsome recorded a total of 42 combined tackles (31 solo), six pass deflections, and was credited with half a sack in 15 games and 15 starts. His overall grade from Pro Football Focus improved to 69.1 in 2022. He also improved his coverage grade of 72.3.

==== 2023 ====
On January 9, 2023, the Cleveland Browns announced their decision to fire defensive coordinator Joe Woods. On January 18, 2023, the Cleveland Browns announced the hiring of Jim Schwartz as defensive coordinator. Head coach Kevin Stefanski retained Newsome and Denzel Ward as the starting cornerback tandem for the third consecutive season.

He was inactive during the Browns' Week 3 victory against the Tennessee Titans after injuring his elbow. Newsome injured his groin and subsequently missed a 27–0 loss against the Arizona Cardinals in Week 9. On November 12, 2023, Newsome made two combined tackles (one solo), was credited with half a sack, made one pass deflection, and returned an interception thrown by Lamar Jackson to fullback Patrick Ricard 34–yards for his first career touchdown late in the fourth quarter to aid in the Browns' 33–31 comeback victory at the Baltimore Ravens. In Week 12, he collected a season–high seven combined tackles (five solo) and broke up a pass during a 12–29 loss at the Denver Broncos. On December 10, 2023, Newsome recorded five solo tackles, a season–high four pass deflections, and intercepted a pass attempt thrown by Trevor Lawrence to wide receiver Calvin Ridley as the Browns defeated the Jacksonville Jaguars 27–31. Head coach Kevin Stefanski opted to rest Newsome and the starting lineup during a Week 18 loss at the Cincinnati Bengals in order to rest and prepare for the postseason. He completed the season with a total of 49 combined tackles (34 solo), 14 pass deflections, two interceptions, and a touchdown in 14 games and 13 starts. He earned an overall grade of 75.8 from Pro Football Focus.

The Cleveland Browns finished the 2023 NFL season second in the AFC North with an 11–6 to clinch a Wildcard berth. On January 13, 2024, Newsome made four solo tackles and one pass deflection as the Browns lost 14–45 at the Houston Texans in the AFC Wildcard Game.

==== 2024 ====
On April 30, 2024, the Cleveland Browns exercised the fifth–year option on Newsome's rookie contract for a one–year, $13.37 million guaranteed. Head coach Kevin Stefanski remained with the pairing of Greg Newsome and Denzel Ward as the starting cornerbacks to begin the regular season. Heading into Week 3, head coach Kevin Stefanski demoted Newsome to the third cornerback on the depth chart and primary backup and named Martin Emerson his replacement for the rest of the season.

In Week 6, he collected a season–high five solo tackles during a 16–20 loss at the Philadelphia Eagles. On December 2, 2024, Newsome recorded one solo tackle, made a season–high two pass deflections, and had his only interception of the season on a pass thrown by Bo Nix to wide receiver Troy Franklin during a 32–41 loss at the Denver Broncos. In Week 14, Newsome recorded two solo tackles before exiting in the fourth quarter of a 14–27 loss at the Pittsburgh Steelers after injuring his hamstring. On December 11, 2024, the Cleveland Browns officially placed him on injured reserve, causing him to miss the last four games (Weeks 15–18) of the regular season. He finished the season with 27 combined tackles (24 solo), five pass deflections, and one interception in 13 games and three starts. He ended the 2024 NFL season with an overall grade of 52.2 from Pro Football Focus, which ranked 177th among 223 qualifying cornerbacks.

=== Jacksonville Jaguars ===
On October 9, 2025, Newsome was traded, along with a 2026 sixth round pick, to the Jacksonville Jaguars in exchange for Tyson Campbell and a 2026 seventh round pick.

=== New York Giants ===
On March 13, 2026, Newsome signed a one-year, $8 million contract with the New York Giants. After starting the first six games, he signed a three-year, $46 million contract extension through the 2029 season.

== NFL career statistics ==
Legend
**Bold**	Career high

=== Regular season ===
Year	Team	Games		Tackles					Interceptions						Fumbles	
Year	Team	GP	GS	Cmb	Solo	Ast	Sck	TFL	PD	Int	Yds	Avg	Lng	TD	FF	FR
2021	CLE	12	11	37	33	4	0.0	0	9	0	–	–	–	–	0	0
2022	CLE	**15**	**15**	42	31	11	**0.5**	0	6	0	–	–	–	–	0	0
2023	CLE	14	13	**49**	**34**	**15**	**0.5**	4	**14**	**2**	**34**	**17.0**	**34**	**1**	0	0
2024	CLE	13	3	27	24	3	0.0	0	5	1	-2	-2.0	-2	0	0	0
2025	CLE	5	5	23	18	5	0.0	2	3	0	–	–	–	–	0	0
2025	JAX	12	11	29	23	6	0.0	0	6	1	0	0.0	0	0	0	0
2026	NYG	5	5	22	15	7	0.0	0	5	1	0	0.0	0	0	0	0
Total		76	62	229	178	51	1.0	6	48	5	32	6.4	34	1	0	0

=== Postseason ===
Year	Team	Games		Tackles					Interceptions						Fumbles	
Year	Team	GP	GS	Cmb	Solo	Ast	Sck	TFL	PD	Int	Yds	Avg	Lng	TD	FF	FR
2023	CLE	1	0	**4**	**4**	0	0.0	0	**1**	0	–	–	–	–	0	0
2025	JAX	1	1	3	2	**1**	0.0	0	0	0	–	–	–	–	0	0
Total		2	1	7	6	1	0.0	0	1	0	–	–	–	–	0	0
