= Donovan Peoples-Jones =

American football player (born 1999)

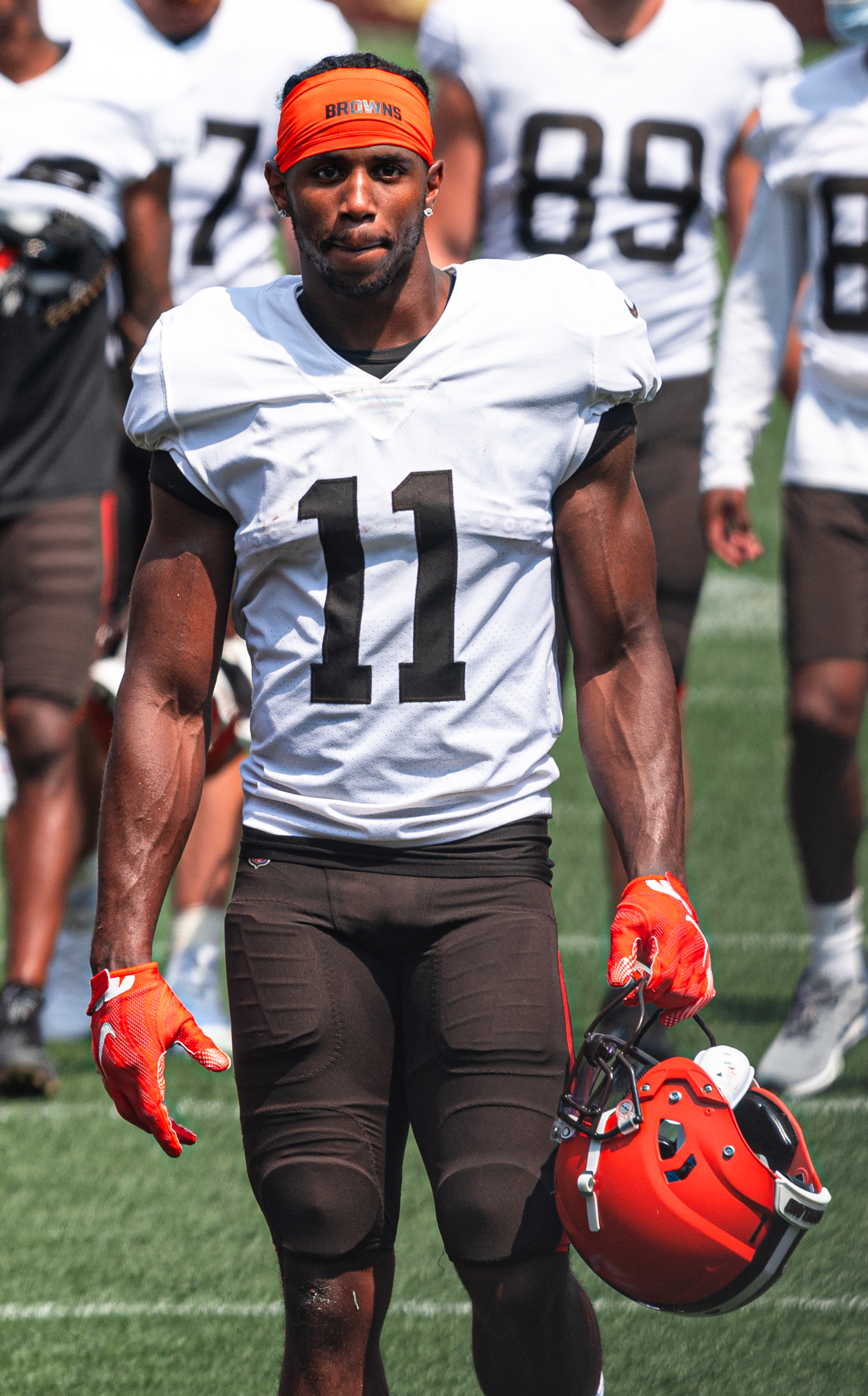
- Peoples-Jones with the Cleveland Browns in 2021

Profile
- Position: Wide receiver

Personal information
- Born: February 19, 1999 (age 27); Detroit, Michigan, U.S.
- Listed height: 6 ft 2 in (1.88 m)
- Listed weight: 204 lb (93 kg)

Career information
- High school: Cass Tech (Detroit, Michigan)
- College: Michigan (2017–2019)
- NFL draft: 2020: 6th round, 187th overall pick

Career history
- Cleveland Browns (2020–2023); Detroit Lions (2023–2024); New Orleans Saints (2025)*
- * Offseason or practice squad member only

Awards and highlights
- 3× Third-team All-Big Ten (2018, 2019); Freshman All-American (2017)

Career NFL statistics
- Receptions: 122
- Receiving yards: 1,895
- Receiving touchdowns: 8
- Return yards: 858
- Return touchdowns: 1
- Stats at Pro Football Reference

Donovan Peoples-Jones (born February 19, 1999), also known as "DPJ", is an American professional football wide receiver and return specialist. He played college football for the Michigan Wolverines and was selected by the Cleveland Browns in the sixth round of the 2020 NFL draft.

== Early life ==
Donovan Peoples-Jones was born in Detroit on February 19, 1999, to Roslyn Peoples and Eddie Jones. He attended Southfield Christian School Kindergarten through 8th grade, but then opted out to look for a career in sports. He then attended Cass Technical High School where he was a five-star recruit and rated as the best wide receiver recruit from the state of Michigan since Charles Rogers in 2000. Peoples-Jones was named the 2016 Michigan High School Football Player of the Year by MLive Media Group on November 22, 2016. As a senior at Cass Tech, Peoples-Jones had 60 receptions for 1,071 yards and 17 touchdowns. On December 15, 2016, he committed to play for the University of Michigan in a nationally televised press conference on ESPN2.

College recruiting
Name	Hometown	School	Height	Weight	40^{‡}	Commit date
Donovan Peoples-Jones; WR	Detroit, Michigan	Cass Technical High School	6 ft 2 in (1.88 m)	193 lb (88 kg)	4.45	Dec 15, 2016
Donovan Peoples-Jones; WR	Recruit ratings: Scout: Rivals: 247Sports: ESPN:					
Overall recruit ranking: Rivals: 12 247Sports: 26 ESPN: 22
‡ Refers to 40-yard dash; Note: In many cases, Scout, Rivals, 247Sports, On3, and ESPN may conflict in their listings of height, weight and 40 time.; In these cases, the average was taken. ESPN grades are on a 100-point scale.; Sources: "Michigan Football Commitments". Rivals.; "ESPN". ESPN.; "2017 Team Ranking". Rivals.com.

== College career ==
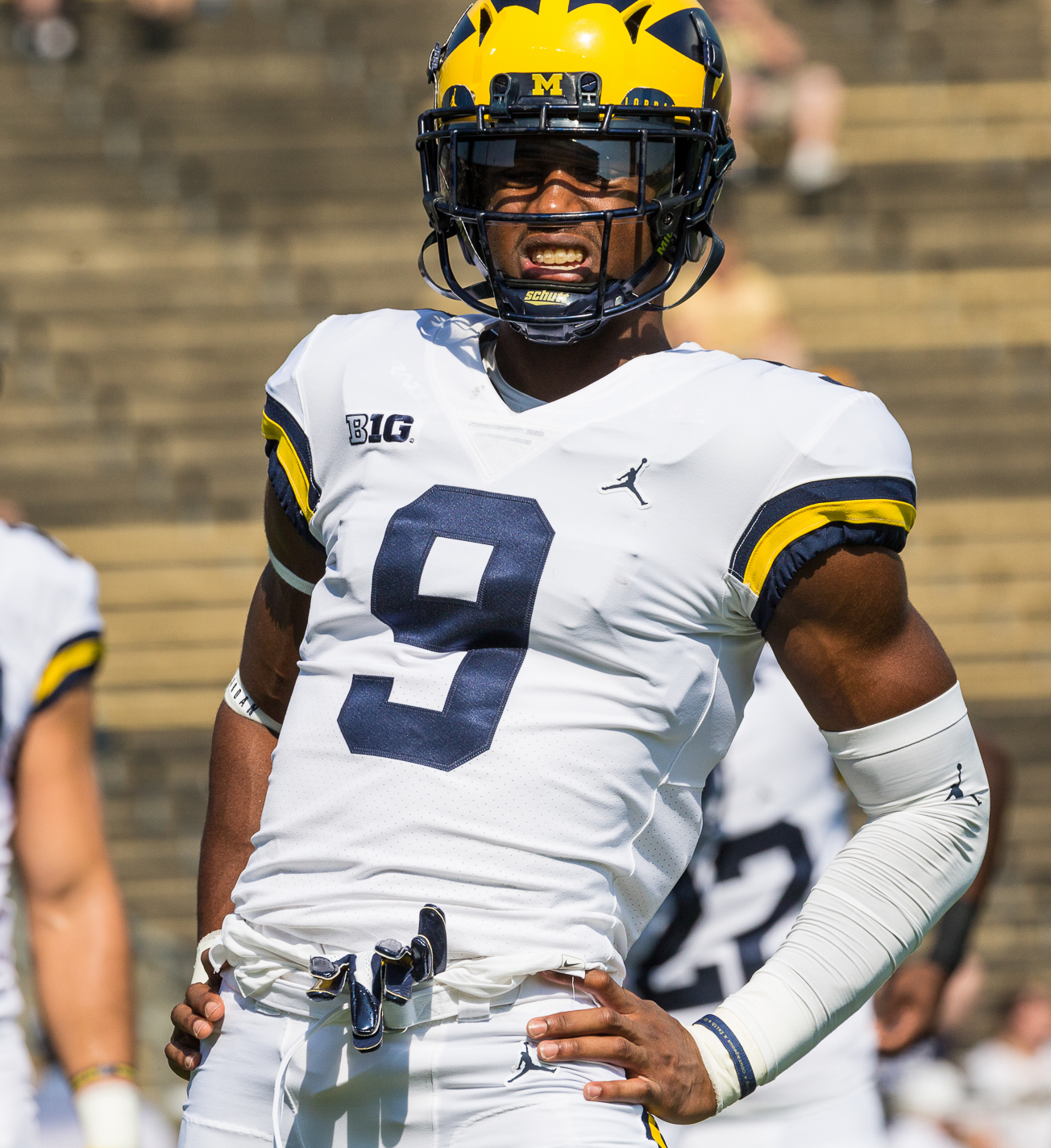
Peoples-Jones with Michigan in 2017

After committing to Michigan, Peoples-Jones enrolled early in January 2017. After watching Peoples-Jones and fellow freshman Tarik Black in spring practice, offensive lineman Mason Cole predicted the pair were "going to be unbelievable."

On September 2, 2017, Peoples-Jones started at punt returner as a true freshman in Michigan's season opener against Florida. He returned five punts for 40 yards, including an 18-yard return. In his second game, he ran 44 yards on a jet sweep in the first quarter against Cincinnati. In his third game, he returned two punts for 104 yards, including a 79-yard return for a touchdown in the third quarter against Air Force. His 79-yard return for a touchdown was the longest by any Michigan punt returner since Steve Breaston went 83 yards against Indiana in 2006. He finished with the second-most return attempts and eighth-most return yards in a single season by a Wolverine, and also caught 22 passes for 277 yards. Following an outstanding freshman season, he was named a Freshman All-American by Football Writers Association of America and 247 Sports, and was named Michigan's Rookie of the Year.

During the 2018 season, Peoples-Jones led the team with 39 receptions, for 541 yards and seven touchdowns. Peoples-Jones ranked second in the Big Ten in punt return average (10.1) among players with 10 returns or more, and his 64 career return attempts ranks fourth in Michigan program history. On October 20, 2018, in a rivalry game against Michigan State, Peoples-Jones had a career-long reception of 79 yards for a touchdown. Following the season, he was named to the All-Big Ten special teams third-team, by both the coaches and media, and the All-Big Ten offensive teams third-team by coaches.

Following the 2019 season, he was named to the All-Big Ten special teams third-team by the media, and the All-Big Ten offensive team honorable mention by the media. On January 4, 2020, Peoples-Jones announced he would forgo his final season of eligibility to enter the 2020 NFL draft.

== Professional career ==
Pre-draft measurables
Height	Weight	Arm length	Hand span	Wingspan	40-yard dash	10-yard split	20-yard split	Vertical jump	Broad jump
6 ft 1 5/8 in (1.87 m)	212 lb (96 kg)	33 1/2 in (0.85 m)	10 1/8 in (0.26 m)	6 ft 7 1/4 in (2.01 m)	4.48 s	1.54 s	2.63 s	44.5 in (1.13 m)	11 ft 7 in (3.53 m)
All values from NFL Combine

=== Cleveland Browns ===
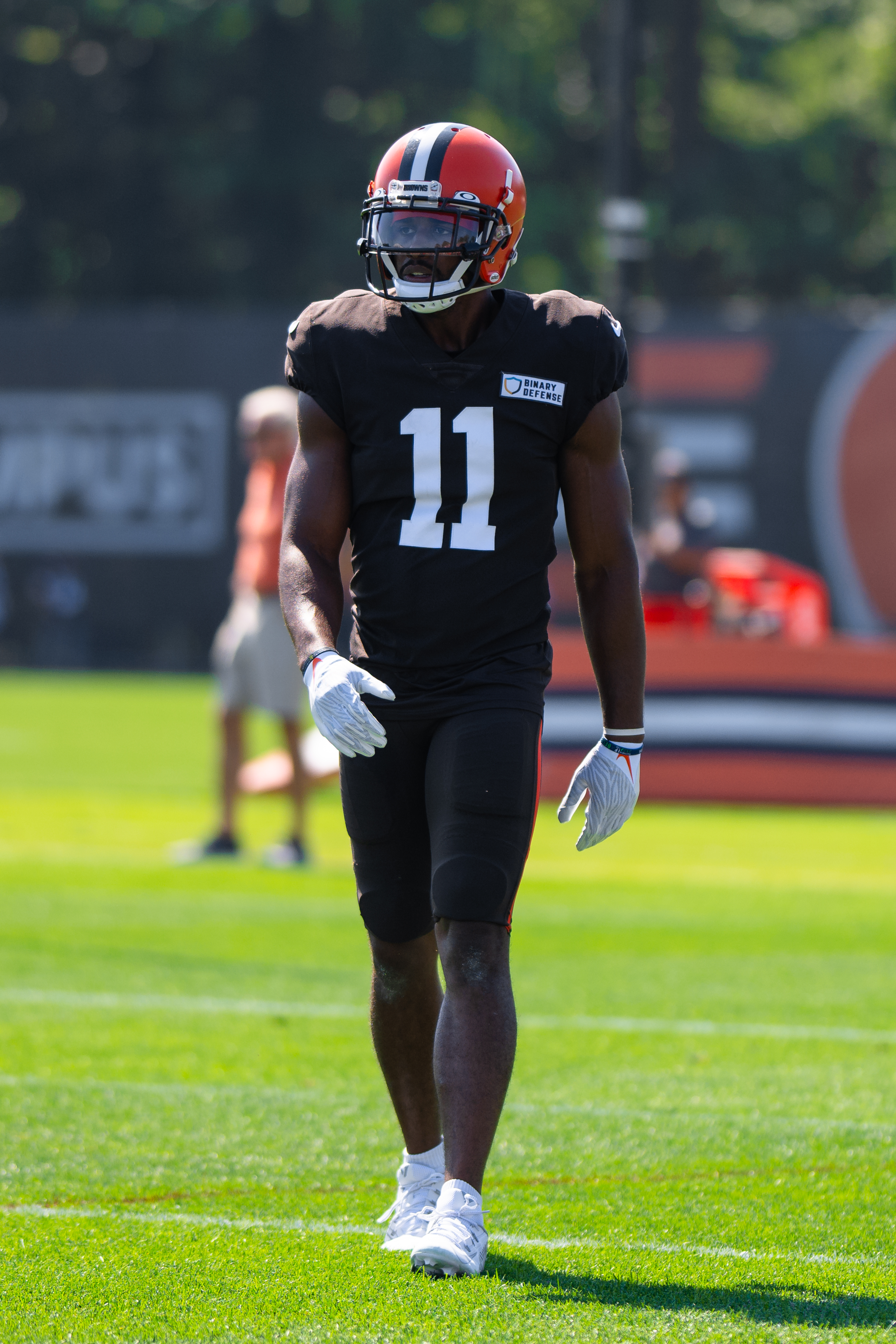
Peoples-Jones with the Browns in 2023

Peoples-Jones was selected by the Cleveland Browns in the sixth round with the 187th overall pick of the 2020 NFL draft. He signed his rookie contract with the Browns on May 20, 2020. On October 25, 2020, Peoples-Jones caught three passes for 56 yards and the game-winning touchdown with 11 seconds left in the game during the 37–34 victory over the Cincinnati Bengals in Week 7. In Week 13 against the Tennessee Titans, Peoples-Jones recorded two catches for 92 yards, including a 75-yard touchdown, during the 41–35 win. In Week 14 against the Baltimore Ravens, Peoples-Jones recorded three catches for 74 yards and a two-point conversion. He was placed on the reserve/COVID-19 list by the team on December 26, 2020, and activated on December 31. He finished his rookie season with 14 receptions for 304 receiving yards and two receiving touchdowns in 12 games.

On October 17, 2021, in Week 6, Peoples-Jones caught four passes for 101 yards and two touchdowns against the Arizona Cardinals, including a Hail Mary at the end of the first half. He finished the 2021 season with 34 receptions for 597 receiving yards and three receiving touchdowns in 14 games.

On December 4, 2022, in Week 13, Peoples-Jones had a 76-yard punt return touchdown in a 27–14 win over the Houston Texans, earning AFC Special Teams Player of the Week. In the following game, against the Bengals, he had eight receptions for 114 receiving yards. In the 2022 season, he finished with 61 receptions for 839 receiving yards and three receiving touchdowns.

=== Detroit Lions ===
On October 31, 2023, Peoples-Jones, a Detroit native, was traded to the Detroit Lions in exchange for a sixth-round pick in the 2025 NFL draft.

On March 18, 2024, Peoples-Jones re-signed with the Lions.

On August 26, 2024, Peoples-Jones was released by the Lions. He re-signed with the team's practice squad two days later on August 28.

=== New Orleans Saints ===
On May 12, 2025, Jones signed with the New Orleans Saints. He was released by New Orleans on August 21.

== Career statistics ==
=== NFL ===
==== Regular season ====
Year	Team	Games		Receiving					Rushing					Fumbles	
Year	Team	GP	GS	Rec	Yds	Avg	Lng	TD	Att	Yds	Avg	Lng	TD	Fum	Lost
2020	CLE	12	2	14	304	21.7	75T	2	0	0	0.0	0	0	0	0
2021	CLE	14	9	34	597	17.6	60T	3	0	0	0.0	0	0	2	1
2022	CLE	17	14	61	839	13.8	42	3	1	2	2.0	2	0	0	0
2023	CLE	7	5	8	97	12.1	29	0	0	0	0	0	0	1	0
2023	DET	8	1	5	58	11.6	20	0	0	0	0	0	0	0	0
Total		58	31	122	1,895	15.5	75	8	1	2	2.0	2	0	3	1

==== Postseason ====
Year	Team	Games		Receiving					Fumbles	
Year	Team	GP	GS	Rec	Yds	Avg	Lng	TD	Fum	Lost
2020	CLE	2	2	2	31	15.5	23	0	0	0
2023	DET	3	0	0	0	0.0	0	0	0	0
Career		5	2	2	31	15.5	23	0	0	0

=== College ===
Season	Team	Conf	GP	Receiving				Rushing				Returning			
Season	Team	Conf	GP	Rec	Yds	Avg	TD	Att	Yds	Avg	TD	Ret	Yds	Avg	TD
2017	Michigan	Big Ten	13	22	277	12.6	0	4	57	14.3	0	40	320	8.0	1
2018	Michigan	Big Ten	13	47	612	13.0	8	3	37	12.3	0	25	250	10.0	1
2019	Michigan	Big Ten	11	34	438	12.9	6	2	−7	−3.5	0	24	173	7.2	0
Career			37	103	1,327	12.9	14	9	87	9.7	0	89	743	8.3	2
