= Cade York =

American football player (born 2001)

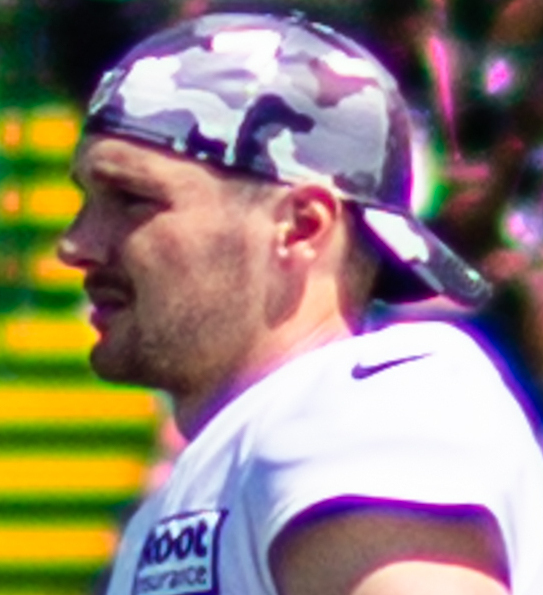
- York with the Cleveland Browns in 2022

Profile
- Position: Placekicker

Personal information
- Born: January 27, 2001 (age 25); McKinney, Texas, U.S.
- Listed height: 6 ft 1 in (1.85 m)
- Listed weight: 206 lb (93 kg)

Career information
- High school: Prosper (Prosper, Texas)
- College: LSU (2019–2021)
- NFL draft: 2022: 4th round, 124th overall pick

Career history
- Cleveland Browns (2022); Tennessee Titans (2023)*; New York Giants (2023); Cleveland Browns (2024)*; Washington Commanders (2024); Cincinnati Bengals (2024); New Orleans Saints (2025)*; New York Jets (2026)*
- * Offseason or practice squad member only

Awards and highlights
- CFP national champion (2019); Second-team All-American (2020); First-team All-SEC (2020); 2× second-team All-SEC (2019, 2021); SEC All-Freshman (2019)

Career NFL statistics as of 2024
- Field goals made: 33
- Field goals attempted: 45
- Field goal percentage: 73.3%
- Longest field goal: 59
- Touchbacks: 71
- Stats at Pro Football Reference

Cade F. York (born January 27, 2001) is an American football placekicker. He played college football for the LSU Tigers, winning the 2019 national championship prior to being selected by the Cleveland Browns in the fourth round of the 2022 NFL draft.

== Early life ==
York attended Prosper High School in Texas, where he played both soccer and football, and was one of the top kicking prospects in the nation in the latter sport. He committed to playing college football at LSU, and had set an Under Armour All-America Game record for longest field goal, hitting a 59-yard field goal, besting his career long in high school of 47 yards.

== College career ==
=== Freshman season ===
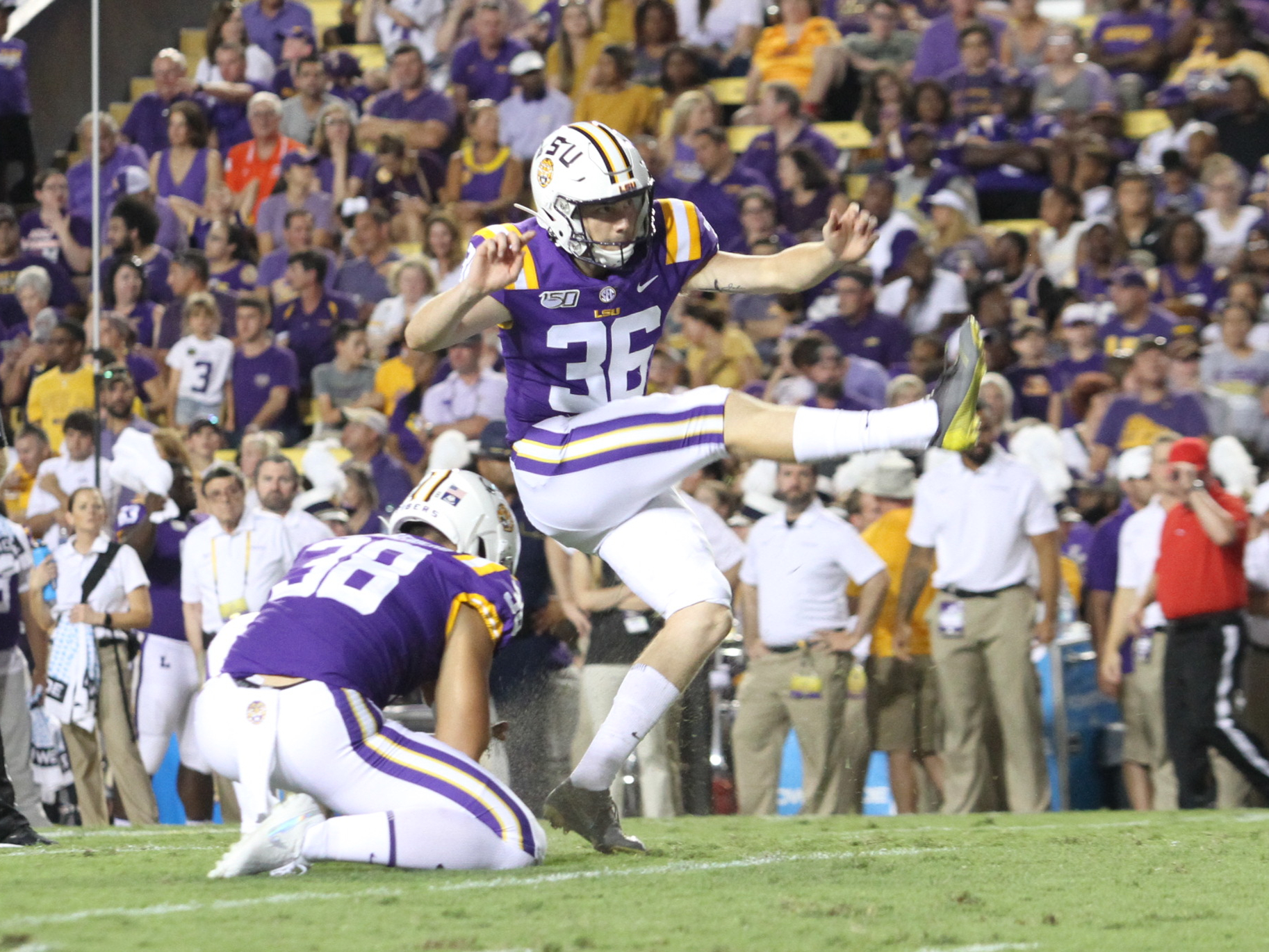
York kicking against Northwestern State in 2019

York was named the Tigers' starting kicker before the start of the 2019 season. He got off to a shaky start in the season, missing an extra point against Northwestern State and field goals against Utah State and Florida, but rebounded to make the Southeastern Conference (SEC) All-Freshman team, as well as second-team All-SEC as the Tigers won the 2020 College Football Playoff.

=== Sophomore season ===
York finished his sophomore season perfect on extra points (36-for-36), hit 85.7% of his field goal attempts (18-for-21), and was a semi-finalist for the Lou Groza Award, given to the top placekicker in college football.

In the December 12 game against Florida, York hit his career-long field goal of 57 yards with 27 seconds remaining in the fourth quarter to put LSU ahead 37–34, leading to the Tigers' upset of the then-No. 6 ranked team in the country.

York was named a first-team All-SEC by the coaches and second-team All-SEC by the Associated Press (AP) at the end of the season. He was also named a second-team All-American by the AP and the Football Writers Association of America.

== Professional career ==
Pre-draft measurables
Height	Weight	Arm length	Hand span	Wingspan	Bench press
6 ft 1 1/4 in (1.86 m)	206 lb (93 kg)	31 5/8 in (0.80 m)	8 3/4 in (0.22 m)	6 ft 4 3/8 in (1.94 m)	12 reps
All values from NFL Combine

=== Cleveland Browns (first stint) ===
York was drafted by the Cleveland Browns with the 124th overall pick in the fourth round of the 2022 NFL draft.

He began his career converting all four field goal attempts and both extra point attempts against the Carolina Panthers, including a game-winning 58-yard field goal in the 26–24 win. York's performance in his first professional game led to American Football Conference Special Teams Player of the Week honors. York finished his rookie season converting 35 of 37 extra-point attempts and 24 of 32 field goal attempts.

After struggling in the 2023 preseason and the Browns acquiring Dustin Hopkins from the Los Angeles Chargers via trade, York was waived on August 29, 2023.

=== Tennessee Titans ===
On August 31, 2023, York was signed to the practice squad of the Tennessee Titans.

=== New York Giants ===
On November 3, 2023, York was signed by the New York Giants off the Titans practice squad. He was waived on November 22 and re-signed to the practice squad two days later. After suffering a quad injury in practice, the Giants placed him on injured reserve on December 23. He was not signed to a reserve/future contract and thus became a free agent at the end of the season.

=== Cleveland Browns (second stint) ===
On March 23, 2024, York signed a contract to return to the Cleveland Browns.

=== Washington Commanders ===
On August 22, 2024, York was traded to the Washington Commanders for a conditional seventh-round pick in the 2025 NFL draft. He was released on September 9, after missing two field goals in the season opener against the Tampa Bay Buccaneers.

=== Cincinnati Bengals ===
On December 4, 2024, York was signed to the Cincinnati Bengals' practice squad following an injury to starting kicker Evan McPherson. He was promoted to the active roster on December 17.

In a Week 16 game against his former team, the Browns, York kicked his career-long and tied the Bengals franchise-long of 59 yards in a 24-6 victory.

In the Bengals Week 17 game against the Denver Broncos, York missed the game winning field goal in overtime. The Bengals were able to get a defensive stop and score the game winning touchdown in a 30-24 victory.

=== New Orleans Saints ===
On November 25, 2025, York was signed to the New Orleans Saints' practice squad following the release of Blake Grupe. He was released on December 18, after Charlie Smyth surpassed him on the depth chart.

=== New York Jets ===
On March 13, 2026, York signed a one year contract with the New York Jets, replacing Nick Folk. He was waived by the Jets on August 25 after it was announced Jason Sanders won the kicker job.

== Career statistics ==
Legend
**Bold**	Career high

=== NFL ===
Year	Team	GP	Field goals				Extra points			Points
Year	Team	GP	FGA	FGM	Lng	Pct	XPA	XPM	Pct	Points
2022	CLE	17	**32**	**24**	58	75.0	**37**	**35**	94.6	**107**
2023	NYG	0	DNP							
2024	WAS	1	2	0	–	0.0	2	2	**100.0**	2
2024	CIN	5	11	9	**59**	**81.8**	15	14	93.3	41
Career		23	45	33	59	73.3	54	51	94.4	150

=== College ===
College statistics
Season	GP	Kicking						
Season	GP	FGM	FGA	FG%	Lng	XPM	XPA	XP%
2019	15	**21**	**27**	77.8	52	**89**	**93**	95.7
2020	10	18	21	**85.7**	**57**	36	36	**100.0**
2021	12	15	18	83.3	56	39	39	**100.0**
Career	37	56	66	81.8	57	164	168	97.6
