= Zaire Mitchell-Paden =

American football player (born 1999)

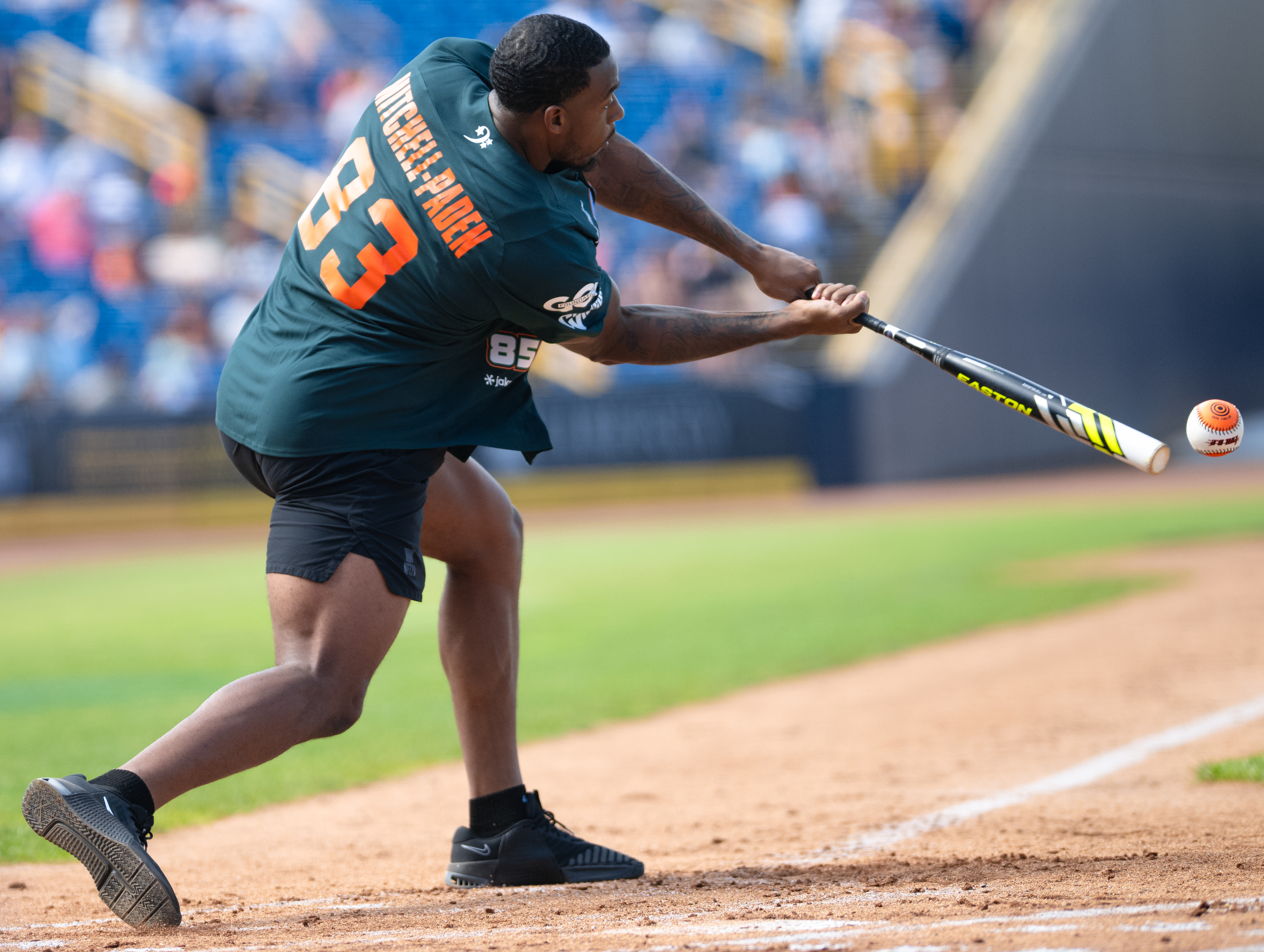
- Mitchell-Paden in 2024

No. 80 – Cleveland Browns
- Position: Tight end
- Roster status: Practice squad

Personal information
- Born: August 20, 1999 (age 27); Rockville, Maryland, U.S.
- Listed height: 6 ft 5 in (1.96 m)
- Listed weight: 257 lb (117 kg)

Career information
- High school: Richard Montgomery (Rockville)
- College: Notre Dame College (2017–2020); Florida Atlantic (2021)
- NFL draft: 2022: undrafted

Career history
- Cleveland Browns (2022–2023); Baltimore Ravens (2024–2025); New Orleans Saints (2025); Houston Texans (2026)*; Cleveland Browns (2026–present)
- * Offseason or practice squad member only

Career NFL statistics as of 2025
- Receptions: 2
- Receiving Yards: 17
- Stats at Pro Football Reference

Zaire Mitchell-Paden (born August 20, 1999) is an American professional football tight end for the Cleveland Browns of the National Football League (NFL). He played college football for the Notre Dame Falcons and Florida Atlantic Owls.

== Early life ==
Mitchell-Paden grew up in Rockville, Maryland and attended Richard Montgomery High School where he lettered in football and basketball.

== College career ==
=== Notre Dame College ===
Mitchell-Paden began his college career at Notre Dame College. During his true freshman season in 2017, he appeared in 10 games and finished the season with two receptions, 16 yards, four kick returns for 26 yards and two tackles. During the 2018 season, he appeared in and started all 14 games and finished the season with 32 caught passes for 435 yards, four touchdowns, one blocked punt and another blocked punt for a touchdown. During the 2019 season, he appeared in 13 games and finished the season with 53 caught passes for 573 yards and six touchdowns. During the 2020 season, he appeared in all five games and finished the season with 14 caught passes for 182 yards.

On April 22, 2021, Mitchell-Paden announced that he would be transferring to Florida Atlantic.

=== Florida Atlantic ===
During the 2021 season, he played in 12 games and finished the season with 9 caught passes for 90 yards and a touchdown.

== Professional career ==
Pre-draft measurables
Height	Weight	Arm length	Hand span	Wingspan	40-yard dash	10-yard split	20-yard split	20-yard shuttle	Three-cone drill	Vertical jump	Broad jump	Bench press
6 ft 4 7/8 in (1.95 m)	257 lb (117 kg)	35 1/8 in (0.89 m)	10 1/4 in (0.26 m)	6 ft 11 in (2.11 m)	4.89 s	1.69 s	2.87 s	4.42 s	7.27 s	35.5 in (0.90 m)	10 ft 5 in (3.18 m)	26 reps
All values from Pro Day

=== Cleveland Browns ===
On April 30, 2022, Mitchell-Paden was signed to the Cleveland Browns as an undrafted free agent after going unselected in the 2022 NFL draft. He was re-signed to the team's practice squad after being waived during final roster cuts on August 31.

On January 9, 2023, Mitchell-Paden was signed to a reserve/futures contract by Cleveland. He was waived by the Browns on August 29, but was re-signed to the practice squad two days later. On September 30, Mitchell-Paden was elevated to the active roster, but reverted to the practice squad two days later.

Mitchell-Paden signed a reserve/future contract with Cleveland on January 15, 2024. On August 27, Mitchell-Paden was waived by the Browns.

=== Baltimore Ravens ===
Mitchell-Paden was signed to the Baltimore Ravens' practice squad on September 16, 2024. He signed a reserve/future contract with Baltimore on January 21, 2025. On August 26, Mitchell-Paden was waived by the Ravens as part of final roster cuts; he was re-signed to the practice squad the following day. Mitchell-Paden was elevated to the active roster and made his first appearance in an NFL game in the team's Week 1 Sunday Night Football game against the Buffalo Bills, where he played 15 snaps, one of which included a key block for a Derrick Henry touchdown run. He was signed to the active roster on September 27. On October 23, Mitchell-Paden was waived by the Ravens.

=== New Orleans Saints ===
On October 24, 2025, Mitchell-Paden was claimed off waivers by the New Orleans Saints. He made two appearances for New Orleans, recording one reception for 14 yards. On January 2, 2026, Mitchell-Paden was placed on season-ending injured reserve due to a knee injury.

On August 29, 2026, Mitchell-Paden was waived by the Saints as a part of preliminary roster cuts.

=== Houston Texans ===
On September 1, 2026, Mitchell-Paden was signed to the Houston Texans' practice squad. He was released on November 4.

=== Cleveland Browns (second stint) ===
On November 10, 2026, Mitchell-Paden signed with the Cleveland Browns practice squad.
