= Joe Woods (American football) =

American football player and coach (born 1970)

Las Vegas Raiders
- Title: Pass game coordinator/defensive backs coach

Personal information
- Born: June 25, 1970 (age 56); North Vandergrift, Pennsylvania, U.S.

Career information
- Position: Cornerback
- College: Illinois State (1988–1991)

Career history
- Muskingum College (1992) Defensive backs coach; Eastern Michigan (1993) Graduate assistant; Northwestern State (1994) Linebackers coach; Grand Valley State (1994–1996) Defensive backs coach; Kent State (1997) Defensive backs coach; Hofstra (1998–2000) Defensive backs coach; Western Michigan (2001–2003) Defensive backs coach; Tampa Bay Buccaneers (2004–2005) Defensive quality control coach; Minnesota Vikings (2006–2013) Defensive backs coach; Oakland Raiders (2014) Defensive backs coach; Denver Broncos (2015–2016) Defensive backs coach; Denver Broncos (2017–2018) Defensive coordinator; San Francisco 49ers (2019) Defensive backs coach & Passing game coordinator; Cleveland Browns (2020–2022) Defensive coordinator; New Orleans Saints (2023–2024) Defensive coordinator; Las Vegas Raiders (2025–present) Pass game coordinator & defensive backs coach

Awards and highlights
- Super Bowl champion (50)
- Coaching profile at Pro Football Reference

Joe Woods (born June 25, 1970) is an American professional football coach who is the defensive pass game coordinator/defensive backs coach for the Las Vegas Raiders of the National Football League (NFL). A coaching veteran of 26 years, Woods has previously served as an assistant coach for the San Francisco 49ers, Denver Broncos, Oakland Raiders, Minnesota Vikings and Tampa Bay Buccaneers, and the defensive coordinator for the Cleveland Browns and New Orleans Saints.

== College career ==
Woods lettered four times as a cornerback and safety during his collegiate career at Illinois State University, graduating from the school in 1992 with a degree in criminal justice. He was team captain as a senior in 1991 and went on to earn first-team All-Gateway Conference honors following his final season.

== Coaching career ==
=== Early years ===
Woods began his coaching career as a defensive backs coach at Muskingum College in 1992 and moved on to become a graduate assistant coach at Eastern Michigan University in 1993. Woods also served as defensive backs coach at Kent State University (1997) and Grand Valley State University (1994–96) following a stint coaching linebackers during the spring of 1994 at Northwestern State University. He coached the same position with Hofstra University from 1998 to 2000, helping the school make consecutive trips to the 1-AA playoff quarterfinals. Woods then became the defensive backs coach for three seasons (2001–03) at Western Michigan University.

=== NFL ===
==== Tampa Bay Buccaneers ====
In 2004, Woods was hired by the Tampa Bay Buccaneers as the defensive backs coach. During his first two seasons with Tampa Bay, Woods coached a talented secondary led by cornerbacks Ronde Barber and Brian Kelly. Barber, an NFL 2000s All-Decade performer, earned first-team All-Pro recognition from the Associated Press following each of his two seasons playing for Woods.

==== Minnesota Vikings ====
Woods was brought to Minnesota in 2006 along with Defensive Coordinator Mike Tomlin, who worked with him as a secondary coach in Tampa Bay. Woods spent eight seasons coaching defensive backs in Minnesota. The Vikings finished among the NFL's top 10 defenses in four of his first five years with the team, capturing NFC North Division titles from 2008 to 2009 and making an NFC Championship Game appearance following the 2009 season.

==== Oakland Raiders ====
Woods coached the Raiders’ defensive backs in 2014, working with veteran safety Charles Woodson, who led the team with 160 tackles (105 solo) and four interceptions in his 17th NFL season.

==== Denver Broncos ====
In Woods’ first season coaching the Broncos’ secondary in 2015, Denver finished first in the NFL against the pass (199.6 ypg) while the defensive backfield accounted for 11 interceptions, 56 passes defensed, nine forced fumbles and four touchdowns. The Broncos posted three interceptions against just one passing touchdown allowed during Denver's postseason run that ended with a victory in Super Bowl 50. In 2016, the Broncos’ secondary held opponents to the fewest yards per game (185.8), yards per attempt (5.8) and passing touchdowns (13) in the NFL.

After the departure of defensive coordinator Wade Phillips, Woods was chosen to be promoted to defensive coordinator for the 2017 season. Denver finished first in the NFL in pass defense in both 2015 (199.6 ypg) and 2016 (185.8) with Woods coaching the team's defensive backs. All four of Denver's starters made at least one Pro Bowl playing for Woods from 2015 to 2016, including cornerbacks Chris Harris Jr. (2015–16) and Aqib Talib (2015–16), who were also named first-team All-Pro selections by the Associated Press in 2016. Safeties T. J. Ward (2015) and Darian Stewart (2016) also earned Pro Bowl recognition while playing for Woods.

In Woods’ first season as defensive coordinator in 2017, the Broncos finished third in the NFL in total defense, giving up just 290.0 yards per game. The Broncos’ fifth-ranked run defense in 2017 was particularly impressive as it improved by more than 40 yards per game after finishing 28th in the NFL in 2016.

==== San Francisco 49ers ====
In January 2019, the San Francisco 49ers hired Joe Woods as defensive back coach and passing game coordinator.

==== Cleveland Browns ====
On February 7, 2020, Woods was hired by the Cleveland Browns as their defensive coordinator under head coach Kevin Stefanski. He was fired on January 9, 2023.

==== New Orleans Saints ====
On February 6, 2023, the New Orleans Saints hired Woods as their defensive coordinator.

==== Las Vegas Raiders ====
On February 6, 2025, the Las Vegas Raiders hired Woods to serve as their defensive pass game coordinator/defensive backs coach.
