= 2020 Cleveland Browns season =

72nd season in franchise history

- Owner: Jimmy Haslam
- General manager: Andrew Berry
- Head coach: Kevin Stefanski (regular season); Mike Priefer (acting head coach during postseason due to COVID-19 exposure)
- Offensive coordinator: Alex Van Pelt
- Defensive coordinator: Joe Woods
- Home stadium: FirstEnergy Stadium

Results
- Record: 11–5
- Division place: 3rd AFC North
- Playoffs: Won Wild Card Playoffs (at Steelers) 48–37; Lost Divisional Playoffs (at Chiefs) 17–22
- All-Pros: 4: RT Jack Conklin (1st team); DE Myles Garrett (1st team); LG Joel Bitonio (2nd team); RG Wyatt Teller (2nd team)
- Pro Bowlers: 3: RB Nick Chubb; G Joel Bitonio; DE Myles Garrett

Uniform
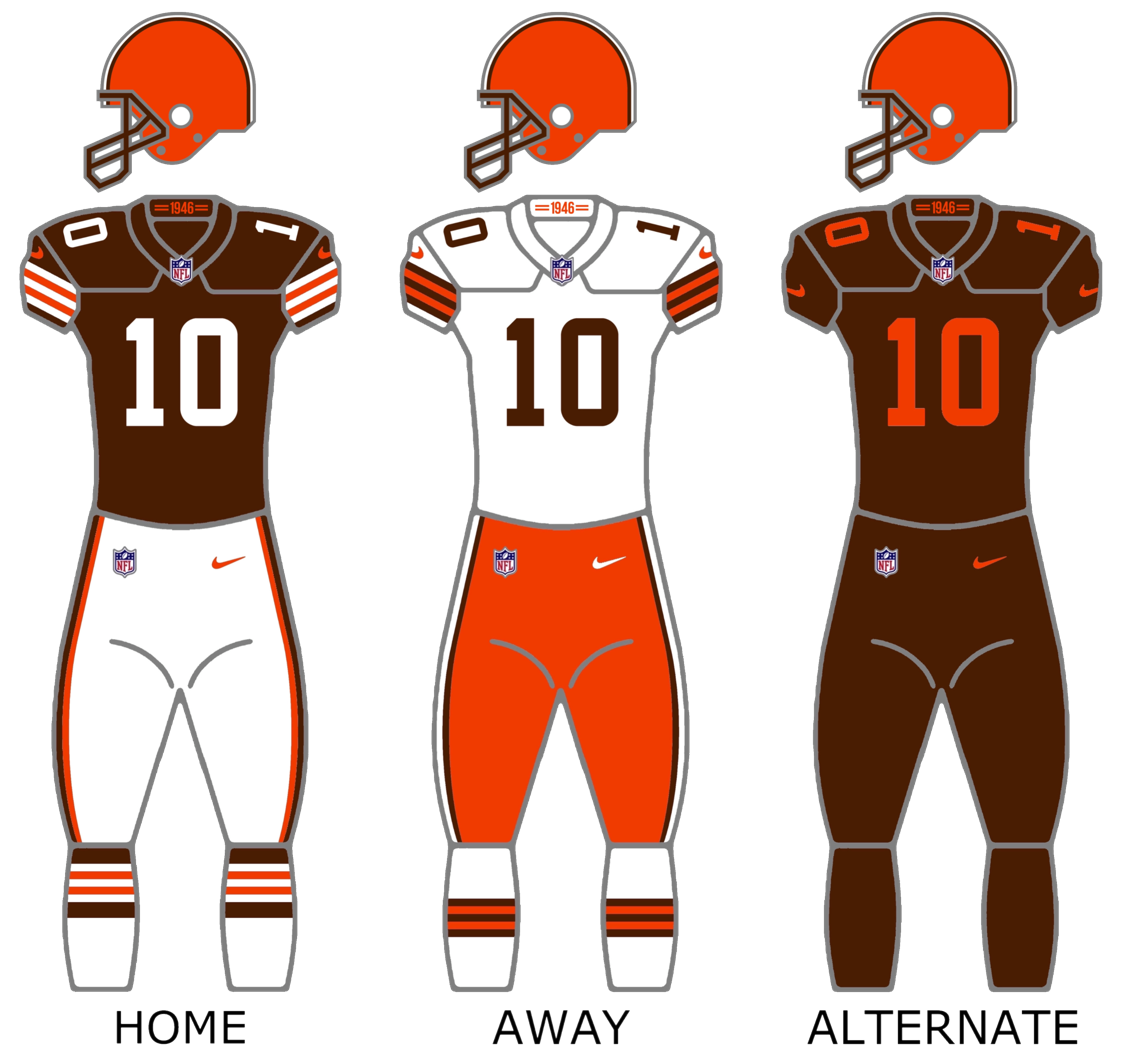

The 2020 season was the Cleveland Browns' 68th as a member of the National Football League (NFL), their 72nd overall, and their first under general manager Andrew Berry and head coach Kevin Stefanski. The Browns improved on their 6–10 record from 2019 and finished 11–5, clinching their first winning season since 2007 and their best since 1994. They also ended their franchise-record and league-high 17-year playoff drought, making it to the playoffs for the first time since 2002. This season began with the team's fourth head coach in six seasons.

In the Wild Card Round, the Browns defeated the Pittsburgh Steelers, 48–37, marking their first (and, as of the 2025 season, only) playoff win since the 1994 season. The next week, the Browns were defeated by the eventual AFC champion Kansas City Chiefs in the Divisional Round, 22–17, which ended the Browns' hopes of returning to the AFC Championship game for the first time since 1989.

== Offseason ==
=== Front office changes ===
On December 31, 2019, the Browns and general manager John Dorsey mutually agreed to part ways. Dorsey had served as the Browns' GM since December 2017.

On January 27, 2020, the Browns hired former Philadelphia Eagles' vice president of football operations Andrew Berry as general manager. Berry previously served as the Browns' vice president of player personnel from 2016 to 2018. At age 32, Berry became the youngest general manager in NFL history.

On January 29, the Browns and vice president of player personnel Alonzo Highsmith and assistant general manager Eliot Wolf mutually agreed to part ways after the hiring of Berry. Both had served in their roles since the 2017 hiring of Dorsey.

=== Coaching changes ===
On December 29, 2019, the Browns fired head coach Freddie Kitchens. In one season as Browns' head coach, Kitchens posted a 6–10 (.375) record.

On January 13, 2020, the Browns hired long-time Minnesota Vikings assistant Kevin Stefanski as head coach. Stefanski served as a Vikings' assistant coach from 2006 to 2019, which included his last two seasons there as their offensive coordinator. This marked Stefanski's first NFL head coaching job.

On January 29, the Browns hired former Cincinnati Bengals' quarterbacks coach Alex Van Pelt as offensive coordinator. Van Pelt, who served as offensive coordinator for the Buffalo Bills in 2009, replaced Todd Monken, who was not retained by Stefanski.

On February 7, the Browns hired former San Francisco 49ers' defensive backs coach Joe Woods as defensive coordinator. Woods, who previously served as the defensive coordinator for the Denver Broncos from 2017 to 2018, replaced Steve Wilks, who was not retained by Stefanski.

=== Roster changes ===
==== Players added ====
Position	Player	Tag	2019 team	Date
DT	Andrew Billings	UFA	Cincinnati Bengals	March 19
DE	Adrian Clayborn	UFA	Atlanta Falcons	March 31
OT	Jack Conklin	UFA	Tennessee Titans	March 18
LB	B.J. Goodson	UFA	Green Bay Packers	March 20
TE	Austin Hooper	UFA	Atlanta Falcons	March 18
CB	Kevin Johnson	UFA	Buffalo Bills	March 19
S	Karl Joseph	UFA	Oakland Raiders	March 19
QB	Case Keenum	UFA	Washington Redskins	March 18
WR	JoJo Natson	UFA	Los Angeles Rams	March 19
CB	Donovan Olumba	UFA	Dallas Cowboys	March 23
S	Andrew Sendejo	UFA	Minnesota Vikings	March 20

==== Players lost ====
Position	Player	Tag	Date lost	2020 team	Date
S	Morgan Burnett	Release	March 16		
CB	T. J. Carrie	Release	February 17	Indianapolis Colts	March 31
TE	Demetrius Harris	Release	February 17	Chicago Bears	February 20
LB	Christian Kirksey	Release	March 10	Green Bay Packers	March 16
G	Eric Kush	Release	February 17	Las Vegas Raiders	March 30
S	Eric Murray	UFA	March 18	Houston Texans	March 21
S	Damarious Randall	UFA	March 18	Las Vegas Raiders	April 3
LB	Joe Schobert	UFA	March 18	Jacksonville Jaguars	March 18
TE	Ricky Seals-Jones	UFA	March 18	Kansas City Chiefs	April 3
LB	Adarius Taylor	Release	February 17	Carolina Panthers	July 27

==== 2020 draft class ====
2020 Cleveland Browns draft
Round	Selection	Player	Position	College	Notes
1	10	Jedrick Wills	OT	Alabama	
2	44	Grant Delpit	S	LSU	From Colts
3	88	Jordan Elliott	DT	Missouri	From Saints
3	97	Jacob Phillips	ILB	LSU	From Texans
4	115	Harrison Bryant	TE	Florida Atlantic	
5	160	Nick Harris	C	Washington	From Colts
6	187	Donovan Peoples-Jones	WR	Michigan	From Cardinals

Notes

- Cleveland acquired a third round pick (No. 90) from Houston in exchange for RB Duke Johnson.
- Cleveland traded its fifth- and sixth-round selections (Nos. 155 and 188) to Buffalo in exchange for G Wyatt Teller and a 2021 seventh-round selection.
- Cleveland acquired a sixth-round selection (No. 187) from Arizona in exchange for CB Jamar Taylor.
- Cleveland acquired a seventh-round selection (No. 236) from Buffalo in exchange for WR Corey Coleman.
- Cleveland acquired a seventh-round selection (No. 244) and G Justin McCray from Green Bay in exchange for a seventh-round selection (No. 224)

==== Undrafted free agents ====
Player	Position	College	Signed	Cut
Solomon Ajayi	LB	Liberty	April 25	September 5
Elijah Benton	S	Liberty	April 25	September 5
Ja'Marcus Bradley	WR	Louisiana	April 25	September 5
Tony Brown	WR	Colorado	April 25	
Kevin Davidson	QB	Princeton	April 25	September 5
Drake Dorbeck	OT	Southern Miss	April 25	August 6
A.J. Green	CB	Oklahoma State	April 25	September 5
Brian Herrien	RB	Georgia	April 25	August 4
Jameson Houston	CB	Baylor	April 25	
Benny LeMay	RB	Charlotte	April 25	September 5
Jovante Moffatt	S	Middle Tennessee State	April 25	September 5
George Obinna	DE	Sacramento State	April 25	
Alex Taylor	OT	South Carolina State	April 25	September 5
Jeffery Whatley	DE	South Alabama	April 25	
Nate Wieting	TE	Iowa	April 25	

=== Opt-outs ===
The NFL and the NFLPA reached an agreement on July 24 to allow players to opt out of playing the 2020 season due to concerns related to the COVID-19 pandemic. These players would not be paid for the season, but receive an advance of $150,000 to $350,000 from their 2021 salary. The following five players opted out of this season:

- DT Andrew Billings
- OT Drake Dorbeck
- G Drew Forbes
- G Colby Gossett
- G Malcolm Pridgeon

=== Uniform changes ===
On April 15, the Browns unveiled new uniforms to be used starting in the 2020 season. The jerseys are brown with white numbers, white with brown numbers. The two main jerseys feature the five-stripe sleeve pattern used prior to 2015. The pants are brown or white, each with an orange-brown-orange stripe pattern on the sides; or orange with a brown-white-brown stripe pattern. The "Cleveland" wordmark on the front of the jerseys and the "Browns" wordmark on the side of the pants were removed. The team also added an alternate uniform, a brown jersey and pants with orange numbers. This is similar to the former "Color Rush" uniform, but with the stripes removed on both the jersey and pants. The changes generally constituted a reversion to the uniforms which the Browns wore up until the 2014 season. The general reception to the uniforms was positive.

== Staff ==
2020 Cleveland Browns staff
Front office: Owners – Jimmy Haslam, Dee Haslam, Whitney Haslam Johnson, J. W. Johnson; Chief strategy officer – Paul DePodesta; EVP/chief operating officer – David Jenkins; General manager/EVP of football operations – Andrew Berry; Vice president of football administration – Chris Cooper; Vice president of football operations – Kwesi Adofo-Mensah; Vice president of player personnel – Glenn Cook; Vice president of research and strategy – Andrew Healy; Vice president of player personnel process and development – Ken Kovash; Director of player personnel – Dan Saganey; Assistant director of pro personnel – Adam Al-Khayyal; Director of research and strategy – Dave Giuliani; Director of scouting research – Mike Cetta; Senior football advisor – Ryan Grigson; Special advisor – Jim Brown; Head coaches: Head coach – Kevin Stefanski; Chief of staff – Callie Brownson; Offensive coaches: Offensive coordinator – Alex Van Pelt; Run game coordinator/running backs – Stump Mitchell; Pass game coordinator/wide receivers – Chad O'Shea; Tight ends – Drew Petzing; Offensive line – Bill Callahan; Assistant offensive line – Scott Peters; Senior offensive assistant – Kevin Rogers; Offensive assistant – T. C. McCartney; Offensive quality control – Seitu Smith	Defensive coaches: Defensive coordinator – Joe Woods; Defensive line – Chris Kiffin; Assistant defensive line – Jeremy Garrett; Linebackers – Jason Tarver; Defensive pass game coordinator/defensive backs – Jeff Howard; Assistant defensive backs – Brandon Lynch; Senior defensive assistant – Ben Bloom; Defensive quality control – Stephen Bravo-Brown; Defensive Assistant - Zach Dunn; Special teams coaches: Special teams coordinator – Mike Priefer; Assistant special teams – Doug Colman; Coaching assistant – Ryan Cordell; Strength and conditioning: Director of high performance – Shaun Huls; Director of strength and conditioning – Larry Jackson; Strength and conditioning assistant/sports science – Josh Christovich; Strength and conditioning assistant – Monty Gibson; Strength and conditioning assistant – Dale Jones; Strength and conditioning assistant – Evan Marcus

== Final roster ==
2020 Cleveland Browns roster
Quarterbacks (QB): 5 Case Keenum; 6 Baker Mayfield; Running backs (RB): 24 Nick Chubb; 27 Kareem Hunt; 31 Andy Janovich; 30 D'Ernest Johnson; Wide receivers (WR): 18 Marvin Hall; 82 Rashard Higgins; 12 KhaDarel Hodge; 83 Alexander Hollins; 80 Jarvis Landry; 11 Donovan Peoples-Jones; Tight ends (TE): 88 Harrison Bryant; 89 Stephen Carlson; 81 Austin Hooper; 85 David Njoku	Offensive linemen (OL): 75 Joel Bitonio G; 78 Jack Conklin T; 58 Anthony Fabiano C; 62 Blake Hance G; 70 Kendall Lamm T; 77 Wyatt Teller G; 64 JC Tretter C; 71 Jedrick Wills T; Defensive linemen (DL): 94 Adrian Clayborn DE; 90 Jordan Elliott DT; 95 Myles Garrett DE; 97 Porter Gustin DE; 91 Joe Jackson DE; 65 Larry Ogunjobi DT; 98 Sheldon Richardson DT; 96 Vincent Taylor DT	Linebackers (LB): 55 Tae Davis MLB; 93 B. J. Goodson MLB; 52 Elijah Lee OLB; 50 Jacob Phillips OLB; 56 Malcolm Smith OLB; 44 Sione Takitaki OLB; 51 Mack Wilson OLB/MLB; Defensive backs (DB): 25 Brian Allen CB; 33 Ronnie Harrison SS; 28 Kevin Johnson CB; 42 Karl Joseph SS; 39 Terrance Mitchell CB; 35 Jovante Moffatt FS; 29 Sheldrick Redwine FS/SS; 23 Andrew Sendejo FS; 36 M. J. Stewart CB; 20 Tavierre Thomas CB; 21 Denzel Ward CB; Special teams (ST): 7 Jamie Gillan P; 47 Charley Hughlett LS; 2 Cody Parkey K	Practice squad: 48 Elijah Benton FS; 84 Ja'Marcus Bradley WR; 92 Sheldon Day DT; 87 Jordan Franks TE (PS/I); 67 Cordel Iwuagwu G; 38 A. J. Green CB (PS/I); 49 John Kelly RB; 17 Kyle Lauletta QB (Protected); 69 Cameron Malveaux DE; 86 Kyle Markway TE; 9 Matt McCrane K (Protected); 41 Montrel Meander OLB; 40 Donovan Olumba CB; 63 Javon Patterson C; 43 Johnny Stanton FB; 15 Ryan Switzer WR; 60 Alex Taylor T; 16 Derrick Willies WR; Reserve: 13 Odell Beckham Jr. WR (IR); 99 Andrew Billings DT (Opt-out); 22 Grant Delpit SS (IR); -- Drake Dorbeck T (Opt-out); 68 Michael Dunn G (IR); 79 Drew Forbes G (Opt-out); 72 Colby Gossett G (Opt-out); 53 Nick Harris G/C (IR); 74 Chris Hubbard G/T (IR); 34 Robert Jackson CB (IR); 19 JoJo Natson WR (IR); 60 George Obinna DE (IR); -- Malcolm Pridgeon G (Opt-out); 10 Taywan Taylor WR (IR); 54 Olivier Vernon DE (IR); 61 Curtis Weaver DE (IR); 26 Greedy Williams CB (IR); 59 Trevon Young DE (IR); Rookies in italics 53 active, 18 reserve, 16 practice squad (2 exempt)

== Preseason ==
The Browns' preseason schedule was announced on May 7, but was later cancelled due to the COVID-19 pandemic.

Week	Date	Opponent	Venue	Result
1	August 15	at Chicago Bears	Soldier Field	Cancelled due to the COVID-19 pandemic
2	August 22	at Green Bay Packers	Lambeau Field	Cancelled due to the COVID-19 pandemic
3	August 30	Minnesota Vikings	FirstEnergy Stadium	Cancelled due to the COVID-19 pandemic
4	September 3	Tampa Bay Buccaneers	FirstEnergy Stadium	Cancelled due to the COVID-19 pandemic

== Regular season ==
=== Schedule ===
The Browns' 2020 schedule was announced on May 7.

Week	Date	Opponent	Result	Record	Venue	Recap
1	September 13	at **Baltimore Ravens**	**L** 6–38	0–1	M&T Bank Stadium	Recap
2	September 17	**Cincinnati Bengals**	**W** 35–30	1–1	FirstEnergy Stadium	Recap
3	September 27	Washington Football Team	**W** 34–20	2–1	FirstEnergy Stadium	Recap
4	October 4	at Dallas Cowboys	**W** 49–38	3–1	AT&T Stadium	Recap
5	October 11	Indianapolis Colts	**W** 32–23	4–1	FirstEnergy Stadium	Recap
6	October 18	at **Pittsburgh Steelers**	**L** 7–38	4–2	Heinz Field	Recap
7	October 25	at **Cincinnati Bengals**	**W** 37–34	5–2	Paul Brown Stadium	Recap
8	November 1	Las Vegas Raiders	**L** 6–16	5–3	FirstEnergy Stadium	Recap
9	Bye					
10	November 15	Houston Texans	**W** 10–7	6–3	FirstEnergy Stadium	Recap
11	November 22	Philadelphia Eagles	**W** 22–17	7–3	FirstEnergy Stadium	Recap
12	November 29	at Jacksonville Jaguars	**W** 27–25	8–3	TIAA Bank Field	Recap
13	December 6	at Tennessee Titans	**W** 41–35	9–3	Nissan Stadium	Recap
14	December 14	**Baltimore Ravens**	**L** 42–47	9–4	FirstEnergy Stadium	Recap
15	December 20	at New York Giants	**W** 20–6	10–4	MetLife Stadium	Recap
16	December 27	at New York Jets	**L** 16–23	10–5	MetLife Stadium	Recap
17	January 3	**Pittsburgh Steelers**	**W** 24–22	11–5	FirstEnergy Stadium	Recap

Note: Intra-division opponents are in bold text.

=== Game summaries ===
==== Week 1: at Baltimore Ravens ====
Week One: Cleveland Browns at Baltimore Ravens – Game summary

Quarter	1	2	3	4	Total
Browns	6	0	0	0	**6**
**Ravens**	10	14	7	7	**38**

at M&T Bank Stadium, Baltimore, Maryland

- Date: September 13
- Game time: 1:00 p.m. EDT
- Game weather: Partly cloudy, 76 °F (24 °C)
- Game attendance: 0
- Referee: Ronald Torbert
- TV announcers (CBS): Ian Eagle, Charles Davis and Evan Washburn
- Recap, Game Book

Game information

**First quarter**

- BAL – Mark Andrews 5-yard pass from Lamar Jackson (Justin Tucker kick), 7:41. Ravens 7–0. **Drive: 8 plays, 49 yards, 4:38.**
- BAL – Justin Tucker 41-yard field goal, 4:38. Ravens 10–0. **Drive: 4 plays, 3 yards, 1:30.**
- CLE – David Njoku 1-yard pass from Baker Mayfield, 1:41. Ravens 10–6. **Drive: 6 plays, 75 yards, 2:57.**

**Second quarter**

- BAL – J. K. Dobbins 3-yard run, (Justin Tucker kick), 2:53. Ravens 17–6. **Drive: 10 plays, 99 yards, 5:48.**
- BAL – Mark Andrews 9-yard pass from Lamar Jackson (Justin Tucker kick), 0:06. Ravens 24–6. **Drive: 7 plays, 69 yards, 0:35.**

**Third quarter**

- BAL – Willie Snead 19-yard pass from Lamar Jackson (Justin Tucker kick), 7:48. Ravens 31–6. **Drive: 6 plays, 50 yards, 3:23.**

**Fourth quarter**

- BAL – J. K. Dobbins 2-yard run, (Justin Tucker kick), 13:00. Ravens 38–6. **Drive: 4 plays, 20 yards, 2:00.**

**Top passers**

- CLE – Baker Mayfield 21/39, 189 yards, 1 TD, 1 INT
- BAL – Lamar Jackson 20/25, 275 yards, 3 TD

**Top rushers**

- CLE – Kareem Hunt 13 rushes, 72 yards
- BAL – Lamar Jackson 7 rushes, 45 yards

**Top receivers**

- CLE – Jarvis Landry 5 receptions, 61 yards
- BAL – Marquise Brown 5 receptions, 101 yards

The Browns traveled to Baltimore to start their season. The Ravens took advantage of two early Browns turnovers with a 5-yard touchdown pass from Lamar Jackson to Mark Andrews and a Justin Tucker 41-yard field goal to take a 10–0 lead. The Browns cut the Ravens' lead to 10–6 late in the first quarter on a Baker Mayfield 1-yard touchdown pass to David Njoku, however Austin Seibert would miss the extra point. The Ravens dominated the rest of the game, scoring 28 unanswered points on two additional Jackson touchdown passes to Andrews and Willie Snead, as well as two touchdown runs by rookie J. K. Dobbins, to win 38–6.

With the loss, the Browns started their season 0–1. They failed to win in Week 1 for the 16th consecutive season.

After the game, the Browns released Seibert after he missed an extra point and field goal attempt. The Browns signed Cody Parkey from their practice squad to replace Seibert.

==== Week 2: vs. Cincinnati Bengals ====
Week Two: Cincinnati Bengals at Cleveland Browns – Game summary

Quarter	1	2	3	4	Total
Bengals	3	10	3	14	**30**
**Browns**	7	14	7	7	**35**

at FirstEnergy Stadium, Cleveland, Ohio

- Date: September 17
- Game time: 8:20 pm. EDT
- Game weather: Clear, 65 °F (18 °C)
- Game attendance: 6,000
- Referee: Shawn Smith
- TV announcers (NFLN): Joe Buck, Troy Aikman, Erin Andrews and Kristina Pink
- Recap, Game Book

Game information

**First quarter**

- CIN – Randy Bullock 38-yard field goal, 7:15. Bengals 3–0. **Drive: 15 plays, 41 yards, 7:47.**
- CLE – Nick Chubb 11-yard run (Cody Parkey kick), 1:54. Browns 7–3, **Drive: 10 plays, 75 yards, 5:25.**

**Second quarter**

- CLE – Odell Beckham Jr. 43-yard pass from Baker Mayfield (Cody Parkey kick), 11:54. Browns 14–3. **Drive: 3 plays, 57 yards, 1:34.**
- CIN – C. J. Uzomah 23-yard pass from Joe Burrow (Randy Bullock kick), 9:00. Browns 14–10. **Drive: 6 plays, 57 yards, 2:54.**
- CLE – Kareem Hunt 6-yard pass from Baker Mayfield (Cody Parkey kick), 1:31. Browns 21–10. **Drive: 12 plays, 63 yards, 3:54.**
- CIN – Randy Bullock 43-yard field goal, 0:06. Browns 21–13. **Drive: 12 plays, 50 yards, 1:29.**

**Third quarter**

- CLE – Nick Chubb 1-yard run (Cody Parkey kick), 5:45. Browns 28–13. **Drive: 2 plays, 1 yard, 0:08.**
- CIN – Randy Bullock 27-yard field goal, 0:23. Browns 28–16. **Drive: 14 plays, 51 yards, 5:25.**

**Fourth quarter**

- CIN – Mike Thomas 4-yard pass from Joe Burrow (Randy Bullock kick), 3:55. Browns 28–23. **Drive: 14 plays, 83 yards, 5:27.**
- CLE – Kareem Hunt 1-yard run (Cody Parkey kick), 3:55. Browns 35–23. **Drive: 6 plays, 75 yards, 2:00.**
- CIN – Tyler Boyd 9-yard pass from Joe Burrow (Randy Bullock kick), 0:48. Browns 35–30. **Drive: 16 plays, 75 yards, 3:12.**

**Top passers**

- CIN – Joe Burrow – 37/61, 316 yards, 3 TD
- CLE – Baker Mayfield – 16/23, 219 yards, 2 TD, INT

**Top rushers**

- CIN – Joe Mixon – 16 rushes, 46 yards
- CLE – Nick Chubb – 22 rushes, 124 yards, 2 TD

**Top receivers**

- CIN – Tyler Boyd – 7 receptions, 72 yards, TD
- CLE – Odell Beckham Jr. – 4 receptions, 74 yards, TD

The Browns opened the home portion of their schedule with a Thursday night game against their in-state rival, the Cincinnati Bengals. The Bengals received the opening kickoff and put together a 15-play drive, culminating in a Randy Bullock field goal to take a 3–0 lead. The Browns responded with a 10-play drive of their own, but were able to find the end zone on a Nick Chubb 11-yard run to take a 7–3 lead. The teams exchanged scores in the second quarter: The Browns scored a touchdown on a 43-yard pass from Baker Mayfield to Odell Beckham Jr., the Bengals responded with a Joe Burrow 23-yard touchdown pass to C. J. Uzomah, the Browns struck back with a Mayfield touchdown pass to Kareem Hunt, and the Bengals added another Bullock field goal, giving the Browns a 21–13 lead going into halftime.

The Browns struck first in the third quarter with a 1-yard touchdown run by Chubb. This was set up Myles Garrett forcing a Burrow fumble, which was recovered by Joe Jackson at the Bengals' 1 yard-line. Bullock kicked another field goal to make it 28–16 after three-quarters. The Bengals closed the Browns' lead to 28–23 midway through the fourth quarter on a Burrow 9-yard touchdown pass to Tyler Boyd set up by a Mayfield interception. However, the Browns regained a two-score lead on a Hunt 1-yard touchdown run set up by long runs from Hunt and Chubb. The Bengals added a touchdown in the final minute but could not recover an onside kick attempt, allowing the Browns to run out the clock in a 35–30 win.

With the win, the Browns improved to 1–1.

==== Week 3: vs. Washington Football Team ====
Week Three: Washington Football Team at Cleveland Browns – Game summary

Quarter	1	2	3	4	Total
Washington	7	0	13	0	**20**
**Browns**	0	17	0	17	**34**

at FirstEnergy Stadium, Cleveland, Ohio

- Date: September 27
- Game time: 1:00 pm. EDT
- Game weather: Sunny, 73 °F (23 °C)
- Game attendance: 6,000
- Referee: Shawn Hochuli
- TV announcers (Fox): Kevin Kugler, Chris Spielman and Laura Okmin
- Recap, Game Book

Game information

**First quarter**

- WAS – Dontrelle Inman 17-yard pass from Dwayne Haskins (Dustin Hopkins kick), 1:44. Washington 7–0. **Drive: 8 plays, 75 yards, 3:24.**

**Second quarter**

- CLE – Cody Parkey 42-yard field goal, 10:46. Washington 7–3. **Drive: 13 plays, 42 yards, 5:58**
- CLE – Nick Chubb 16-yard run (Cody Parkey kick), 5:58. Browns 10–7. **Drive: 3 plays, 28 yards, 1:26**
- CLE – Kareem Hunt 9-yard pass from Baker Mayfield (Cody Parkey kick), 0:32. Browns 17–7. **Drive: 3 plays, 24 yards, 1:23**

**Third quarter**

- WAS – Antonio Gibson 2-yard run (kick failed), 9:05. Browns 17–13. **Drive: 6 plays, 49 yards, 2:22.**
- WAS – Dontrelle Inman 11-yard pass from Dwayne Haskins (Dustin Hopkins kick), 2:20. Washington 20–17. **Drive: 12 plays, 54 yards, 5:08.**

**Fourth quarter**

- CLE – Harrison Bryant 3-yard pass from Baker Mayfield (Cody Parkey kick), 11:14. Browns 24–20. **Drive: 11 plays, 75 yards, 6:06**
- CLE – Nick Chubb 20-yard run (Cody Parkey kick), 8:40. Browns 31–20. **Drive: 3 plays, 35 yards, 1:23**
- CLE – Cody Parkey 30-yard field goal, 1:10. Browns 34–20. **Drive: 10 plays, 29 yards, 5:20**

**Top passers**

- WAS – Dwayne Haskins – 21/37, 224 yards, 2 TD, 3 INT
- CLE – Baker Mayfield – 16/23, 156 yards, 2 TD

**Top rushers**

- WAS – Antonio Gibson – 9 rushes, 49 yards, TD
- CLE – Nick Chubb – 19 rushes, 108 yards, 2 TD

**Top receivers**

- WAS – Terry McLaurin – 4 receptions, 83 yards
- CLE – Odell Beckham Jr. – 4 receptions, 59 yards

The Browns hosted Washington in Week 3. Washington took an early 7–0 lead on a Dwayne Haskins touchdown pass to Dontrelle Inman. In the second quarter, the Browns took advantage of two Haskins interceptions while scoring 17 points in the quarter: a Cody Parkey 42-yard field goal and a pair of touchdowns on a Nick Chubb 16-yard run and a Baker Mayfield 9-yard pass to Kareem Hunt to take a 17–7 lead into halftime. In the third quarter, Washington scored two touchdowns on an Antonio Gibson 2-yard run and a Haskins 11-yard pass to Inman to re-take the lead at 20–17. However, the Browns took a 24–20 lead on a Mayfield 3-yard touchdown pass to Harrison Bryant and built their lead to 31–20 on a Chub 20-yard touchdown run that was set up by another Haskins interception. Parkey added a late field goal to make the final score 34–20.

With the win, the Browns improved to 2–1. This win ended the longest active losing-record streak in the league; Week 4 was the first game since Week 15 of the 2014 season, a span of 90 games, in which the Browns entered with a record above .500.

==== Week 4: at Dallas Cowboys ====
Week Four: Cleveland Browns at Dallas Cowboys – Game summary

Quarter	1	2	3	4	Total
**Browns**	7	24	10	8	**49**
Cowboys	14	0	0	24	**38**

at AT&T Stadium, Arlington, Texas

- Date: October 4
- Game time: 1:00 pm. EDT/12:00 p.m. CDT
- Game weather: None (retractable roof closed)
- Game attendance: 25,021
- Referee: Clay Martin
- TV announcers (Fox): Kevin Burkhardt, Daryl Johnston and Pam Oliver
- Recap, Game Book

Game information

**First quarter**

- CLE – Odell Beckham Jr. 37-yard pass from Jarvis Landry (Cody Parkey kick), 12:13. Browns 7–0. **Drive: 4 plays, 69 yards, 1:09**
- DAL – CeeDee Lamb 43-yard pass from Dak Prescott (Greg Zuerlein kick), 9:53. Tied 7–7. **Drive: 5 plays, 88 yards, 2:20**
- DAL – Amari Cooper 20-yard pass from Dak Prescott (Greg Zuerlein kick), 2:08. Cowboys 14–7. **Drive: 9 plays, 84 yards, 4:02**

**Second quarter**

- CLE – Odell Beckham Jr. 4-yard pass from Baker Mayfield (Cody Parkey kick), 13:07. Tied 14–14. **Drive: 9 plays, 75 yards, 4:01**
- CLE – Austin Hooper 1-yard pass from Baker Mayfield (Cody Parkey kick), 9:22. Browns 21–14. **Drive: 4 plays, 34 yards, 1:53**
- CLE – Kareem Hunt 2-yard run (Cody Parkey kick), 7:20. Browns 28–14. **Drive: 6 plays, 51 yards, 1:47**
- CLE – Cody Parkey 37-yard field goal, 0:00. Browns 31–14. **Drive: 13 plays, 71 yards, 3:53**

**Third quarter**

- CLE – Kareem Hunt 14-yard run (Cody Parkey kick), 10:51. Browns 38–14. **Drive: 7 plays, 70 yards, 4:09**
- CLE – Cody Parkey 44-yard field goal, 0:40. Browns 41–14. **Drive: 8 plays, 40 yards, 4:46**

**Fourth quarter**

- DAL – Tony Pollard 3-yard run (Dak Prescott-Ezekiel Elliott pass), 12:24. Browns 41–22. **Drive: 11 plays, 77 yards, 3:16**
- DAL – Dalton Schultz 26-yard pass from Dak Prescott (Dak Prescott run), 6:31. Browns 41–30. **Drive: 7 plays, 84 yards, 1:50**
- DAL – CeeDee Lamb 5-yard pass from Dak Prescott (Amari Cooper run), 3:42. Browns 41–38. **Drive: 11 plays, 80 yards, 2:18**
- CLE – Odell Beckham Jr. 50-yard run (Stephen Carlson run), 3:25. Browns 49–38. **Drive: 1 play, 50 yards, 0:17**

**Top passers**

- CLE – Baker Mayfield – 19/30, 165 yards, 2 TD
- DAL – Dak Prescott – 41/58, 502 yards, 4 TD, INT

**Top rushers**

- CLE – D'Ernest Johnson – 13 rushes, 95 yards
- DAL – Ezekiel Elliott – 12 rushes, 54 yards

**Top receivers**

- CLE – Odell Beckham Jr. – 5 receptions, 81 yards, 2 TD
- DAL – Amari Cooper – 12 receptions, 134 yards, TD

The Browns traveled to Dallas to take on the Cowboys in Week 4. The Browns opened the scoring on a trick play as WR Jarvis Landry threw a 37-yard touchdown pass to Odell Beckham Jr. to take a 7–0 lead. The Cowboys then scored two touchdowns later in the quarter on Dak Prescott passes to CeeDee Lamb and Amari Cooper to tie the game and then take a 14–7 lead after the first quarter. The Browns took control of the game by scoring 34 straight points in the second and third quarters. In the second quarter, Baker Mayfield completed touchdown passes to Beckham and Austin Hooper, Kareem Hunt scored a touchdown run, and Cody Parkey added a field goal to give the Browns a 31–14 lead at halftime. The Browns scored on another Hunt run on their opening drive of the third quarter and added another Parkey field goal to build their lead to 41–14 after three-quarters.

However, the Cowboys mounted a comeback in the fourth quarter. They scored three touchdowns on a Tony Pollard run and Prescott passes to Dalton Schultz and Lamb – converting the two-point conversion each time – to cut the Browns' lead to 41–38 with 3:42 to go. However, the Browns recovered the Cowboys' on-side kick attempt and scored on the next play on a 50-yard run by Beckham. The extra point attempt was blocked, but a Cowboys player muffed the ball and the Browns tight end Stephen Carlson recovered it in the end zone for a two-point conversion, giving the Browns a 49–38 lead. On the ensuing possession, Denzel Ward intercepted a Prescott pass to seal the 49–38 win.

With the win, the Browns improved to 3–1. This marked the team's best 4-game start to a season since 2001. Defensive end Myles Garrett was named AFC Defensive Player of the Week after recording two sacks and a forced fumble.

==== Week 5: vs. Indianapolis Colts ====
Week Five: Indianapolis Colts at Cleveland Browns – Game summary

Quarter	1	2	3	4	Total
Colts	7	3	10	3	**23**
**Browns**	3	17	7	5	**32**

at FirstEnergy Stadium, Cleveland, Ohio

- Date: October 11
- Game time: 4:25 pm. EDT
- Game weather: Sunny, 64 °F (18 °C)
- Game attendance: 11,759
- Referee: Scott Novak
- TV announcers (CBS): Spero Dedes and Adam Archuleta
- Recap, Game Book

Game information

**First quarter**

- CLE – Cody Parkey 24-yard field goal, 10:24. Browns 3–0. **Drive: 10 plays, 69 yards, 4:36.**
- IND – Jonathan Taylor 4-yard run (Rodrigo Blankenship kick), 6:00. Colts 7–3. **Drive: 9 plays, 72 yards, 4:24.**

**Second quarter**

- CLE – Kareem Hunt 2-yard pass from Baker Mayfield (Cody Parkey kick), 14:06. Browns 10–7. **Drive: 14 plays, 81 yards, 6:54.**
- IND – Rodrigo Blankenship 32-yard field goal, 10:15. Tied 10–10. **Drive: 7 plays, 61 yards, 3:51.**
- CLE – Rashard Higgins 15-yard pass from Baker Mayfield (Cody Parkey kick), 5:58. Browns 17–10. **Drive: 9 plays, 75 yards, 4:17.**
- CLE – Cody Parkey 36-yard field goal, 0:13. Browns 20–10. **Drive: 12 plays, 64 yards, 4:00.**

**Third quarter**

- CLE – Ronnie Harrison 47-yard interception return (Cody Parkey kick), 12:15. Browns 27–10.
- IND – Isaiah Rodgers 101-yard kickoff return (Rodrigo Blankenship kick), 12:00. Browns 27–17.
- IND – Rodrigo Blankenship 37-yard field goal, 3:58. Browns 27–20. **Drive: 10 plays, 29 yards, 5:15.**

**Fourth quarter**

- CLE – Intentional grounding penalty on Philip Rivers enforced in end zone for a safety, 14:39. Browns 29–20.
- IND – Rodrigo Blankenship 25-yard field goal, 2:50. Browns 29–23. **Drive: 12 plays, 63 yards, 4:15.**
- CLE – Cody Parkey 46-yard field goal, 0:21. Browns 32–23. **Drive: 8 plays, 40 yards, 2:29.**

**Top passers**

- IND – Philip Rivers – 21/33, 243 yards, 2 INT
- CLE – Baker Mayfield – 21/37, 247 yards, 2 TD, 2 INT

**Top rushers**

- IND – Jonathan Taylor – 12 rushes, 57 yards, TD
- CLE – Kareem Hunt – 20 rushes, 72 yards

**Top receivers**

- IND – T. Y. Hilton – 6 receptions, 69 yards
- CLE – Jarvis Landry – 4 receptions, 88 yards

The Browns returned home to host the Indianapolis Colts in a battle of 3–1 records. The Browns opened the scoring on a Cody Parkey 24-yard field goal on their opening drive to take a 3–0 lead. However, the Colts responded on their first drive with a Jonathan Taylor 4-yard touchdown to take a 7–3 lead. In the second quarter, the Browns took a 10–7 lead on a Baker Mayfield 2-yard touchdown pass to Kareem Hunt, but the Colts tied it at 10–10 as Rodrigo Blankenship hit a 32-yard field goal. The Browns would add a 15-yard touchdown pass from Mayfield to Rashard Higgins and a Parkey 34-yard field goal to take a 20–10 lead at halftime.

The Browns extended their lead to 27–10 as Ronnie Harrison intercepted a Philip Rivers pass and returned it for a touchdown. However, Isaiah Rodgers returned the ensuing kickoff 101 yards for a touchdown to cut the Browns' lead to 27–17. Blankenship would add another field goal on a drive set up by a Mayfield interception to cut the Browns' lead to 27–20. Early in the fourth quarter, the Browns recorded a safety on a Rivers intentional grounding penalty in the end zone to build their lead to two possessions, at 29–20. The teams traded late field goals to give the Browns a 32–23 win.

With the win, the Browns improved to 4–1. This marked the team's best 5–game start to a season since 1994. This was also their first 4-game winning streak since 2009.

==== Week 6: at Pittsburgh Steelers ====
Week Six: Cleveland Browns at Pittsburgh Steelers – Game summary

Quarter	1	2	3	4	Total
Browns	0	7	0	0	**7**
**Steelers**	10	14	7	7	**38**

at Heinz Field, Pittsburgh, Pennsylvania

- Date: October 18
- Game time: 1:00 pm. EDT
- Game weather: Mostly sunny, 61 °F (16 °C)
- Game attendance: 5,260
- Referee: John Hussey
- TV announcers (CBS): Jim Nantz, Tony Romo, Tracy Wolfson and Gene Steratore
- Recap, Game Book

Game information

**First quarter**

- PIT – Chris Boswell 35-yard field goal, 10:35. Steelers 3–0. **Drive: 11 plays, 58 yards, 4:25.**
- PIT – Minkah Fitzpatrick 33-yard interception return (Chris Boswell kick), 8:58. Steelers 10–0. **Drive: 3 plays, 7 yards, 1:37.**

**Second quarter**

- PIT – James Conner 3-yard run (Chris Boswell kick), 10:28. Steelers 17–0. **Drive: 7 plays, 88 yards, 3:37.**
- PIT – James Washington 28-yard pass from Ben Roethlisberger (Chris Boswell kick), 5:43. Steelers 24–0. **Drive: 4 plays, 50 yards, 1:58.**
- CLE – Rashard Higgins 13-yard pass from Baker Mayfield (Cody Parkey kick), 1:01. Steelers 24–7. **Drive: 9 plays, 75 yards, 4:42.**

**Third quarter**

- PIT – Chase Claypool 3-yard run (Chris Boswell kick), 0:52. Steelers 31–7. **Drive: 8 plays, 28 yards, 5:03.**

**Fourth quarter**

- PIT – Benny Snell 1-yard run (Chris Boswell kick), 8:08. Steelers 38–7. **Drive: 9 plays, 55 yards, 5:35.**

**Top passers**

- CLE – Baker Mayfield – 10/18, 119 yards, TD, 2 INT
- PIT – Ben Roethlisberger – 14/22, 162 yards, TD

**Top rushers**

- CLE – Kareem Hunt – 13 rushes, 40 yards
- PIT – James Conner – 20 rushes, 101 yards, TD

**Top receivers**

- CLE – Austin Hooper – 5 receptions, 52 yards
- PIT – Chase Claypool – 4 receptions, 74 yards

The Browns traveled to Pittsburgh to take on their division rival, the Pittsburgh Steelers, hoping to end a 16-game losing streak to the Steelers in Pittsburgh, having last won there in 2003. However, Pittsburgh dominated the game from the beginning, opening the scoring with a Chris Boswell 35-yard field goal and a Minkah Fitzpatrick interception return for a touchdown on the Browns' third offensive play to take an early 10–0 lead. Pittsburgh added two more touchdowns in the second quarter on a James Conner run and a Ben Roethlisberger pass to James Washington to extend their lead to 24–0. Cleveland got on the board late in the quarter on a Baker Mayfield pass to Rashard Higgins to make it 24–7 at halftime. The Steelers continued their domination into the second half, adding a pair of touchdowns on a Roethlisberger pass to Chase Claypool and a Benny Snell run to make the final score 38–7.

Mayfield left the game late in the third quarter after aggravating a minor rib injury he suffered in the Browns' previous game. Backup Case Keenum served as the Browns' quarterback for the remainder of the game. The Browns' run offense, which came into the game averaging a league-leading 188 yards per game, was held to 75 yards.

With their 17th consecutive loss in Pittsburgh, the Browns fell to 4–2.

==== Week 7: at Cincinnati Bengals ====
Week Seven: Cleveland Browns at Cincinnati Bengals – Game summary

Quarter	1	2	3	4	Total
**Browns**	3	7	7	20	**37**
Bengals	7	10	3	14	**34**

at Paul Brown Stadium, Cincinnati, Ohio

- Date: October 25
- Game time: 1:00 pm. EDT
- Game weather: Cloudy, 48 °F (9 °C)
- Game attendance: 9,732
- Referee: Tony Corrente
- TV announcers (CBS): Spero Dedes and Adam Archuleta
- Recap, Game Book

Game information

**First quarter**

- CIN – Joe Burrow 1-yard run (Randy Bullock kick), 6:47. Bengals 7–0. **Drive: 3 plays, 24 yards, 1:34.**
- CLE – Cody Parkey 43-yard field goal, 1:21. Bengals 7–3. **Drive: 5 plays, 8 yards, 1:39.**

**Second quarter**

- CIN – Randy Bullock 37-yard field goal, 11:09. Bengals 10–3. **Drive: 11 plays, 65 yards, 5:12.**
- CLE – Harrison Bryant 3-yard pass from Baker Mayfield (Cody Parkey kick), 3:39. Tied 10–10. **Drive: 11 plays, 75 yards, 7:30.**
- CIN – Tyler Boyd 11-yard pass from Joe Burrow (Randy Bullock kick), 0:15. Bengals 17–10. **Drive: 10 plays, 75 yards, 3:24.**

**Third quarter**

- CLE – Harrison Bryant 6-yard pass from Baker Mayfield (Cody Parkey kick), 9:32. Tied 17–17. **Drive: 9 plays, 75 yards, 5:28.**
- CIN – Randy Bullock 23-yard field goal, 2:51. Bengals 20–17. **Drive: 12 plays, 71 yards, 6:41.**

**Fourth quarter**

- CLE – David Njoku 16-yard pass from Baker Mayfield (Cody Parkey kick), 13:13. Browns 24–20. **Drive: 8 plays, 79 yards, 4:38.**
- CIN – Tee Higgins 16-yard pass from Joe Burrow (Randy Bullock kick), 8:45. Bengals 27–24. **Drive: 12 plays, 80 yards, 4:28.**
- CLE – Kareem Hunt 8-yard pass from Baker Mayfield (Cody Parkey kick), 4:53. Browns 31–27. **Drive: 7 plays, 75 yards, 3:52.**
- CIN – Giovani Bernard 3-yard pass from Joe Burrow (Randy Bullock kick), 1:06. Bengals 34–31. **Drive: 12 plays, 75 yards, 3:47.**
- CLE – Donovan Peoples-Jones 24-yard pass from Baker Mayfield (kick failed), 0:11. Browns 37–34. **Drive: 5 plays, 75 yards, 0:55.**

**Top passers**

- CLE – Baker Mayfield – 22/28, 297 yards, 5 TD, INT
- CIN – Joe Burrow – 35/47, 406 yards, 3 TD, INT

**Top rushers**

- CLE – Kareem Hunt – 18 rushes, 76 yards
- CIN – Giovani Bernard – 13 rushes, 37 yards

**Top receivers**

- CLE – Rashard Higgins – 6 receptions, 110 yards
- CIN – Tyler Boyd – 11 receptions, 101 yards, TD

The Browns traveled to Cincinnati to take on the Bengals, hoping to bounce back from the tough loss at Pittsburgh. After both teams had interceptions on their opening drives, Cincinnati opened the scoring with Joe Burrow 1-yard touchdown run to take a 7–0 lead. The teams then traded field goals before Cleveland scored on a Baker Mayfield 3-yard touchdown pass to Harrison Bryant. making the score 10–10. Cincinnati took a 17–10 lead into halftime on a Burrow 11-yard touchdown pass to Tyler Boyd.

The second half saw the teams go back-and-forth. Cleveland tied the score at 17 with a Mayfield 6-yard touchdown pass to Bryant. Cincinnati took a 20–17 lead into the fourth quarter on a Randy Bullock 23-yard field goal. The fourth quarter featured an NFL record five go-ahead touchdown passes. Cleveland took a 24–20 lead on a Mayfield 16-yard pass to David Njoku. Cincinnati went up 27–24 with a 16-yard touchdown pass from Burrow to Tee Higgins. Cleveland responded with an 8-yard touchdown pass from Mayfield to Kareem Hunt, taking a 31–27 lead. Cincinnati took the lead back, 34–31 with 1:06 remaining on a Burrow 3-yard touchdown pass to Giovani Bernard. The Browns drove down the field in the final minute and Mayfield connected with Donovan Peoples-Jones for a 24-yard touchdown, giving the Browns a 37–34 lead after missing the extra point attempt. An unsuccessful Hail Mary pass attempt by Burrow ended the game, with the Browns hanging on to a 37–34 win.

With the win, the Browns improved to 5–2. Mayfield was named AFC Offensive Player of the Week for his 297-yard, 5 touchdown performance. He also set a franchise record with 21 consecutive completed passes.

The following day, the Browns announced that WR Odell Beckham Jr., who left the game with a knee injury in the first quarter, suffered a torn ACL and will miss the rest of the season.

On October 29, DE Myles Garrett was named AFC Defensive Player of the Month for October. Garrett recorded two forced fumbles and led the NFL with six sacks during the month.

==== Week 8: vs. Las Vegas Raiders ====
Week Eight: Las Vegas Raiders at Cleveland Browns – Game summary

Quarter	1	2	3	4	Total
**Raiders**	0	6	0	10	**16**
Browns	0	3	3	0	**6**

at FirstEnergy Stadium, Cleveland, Ohio

- Date: November 1
- Game time: 1:00 pm. EST
- Game weather: Cloudy, 49 °F (9 °C)
- Game attendance: 10,972
- Referee: Bill Vinovich
- TV announcers (Fox): Kevin Kugler, Chris Spielman and Laura Okmin
- Recap, Game Book

Game information

**First quarter**

- No scoring plays.

**Second quarter**

- CLE – Cody Parkey 41-yard field goal, 13:39. Browns 3–0. **Drive: 14 plays, 60 yards, 7:52.**
- LV – Daniel Carlson 29-yard field goal, 5:21. Tied 3–3. **Drive: 16 plays, 58 yards, 8:14.**
- LV – Daniel Carlson 33-yard field goal, 0:02. Raiders 6–3. **Drive: 11 plays, 51 yards, 3:59.**

**Third quarter**

- CLE – Cody Parkey 38-yard field goal, 8:50. Tied 6–6. **Drive: 11 plays, 55 yards, 6:10.**

**Fourth quarter**

- LV – Hunter Renfrow 4-yard pass from Derek Carr (Daniel Carlson kick), 14:56. Raiders 13–6. **Drive: 15 plays, 75 yards, 8:54.**
- LV – Daniel Carlson 24-yard field goal, 4:26. Raiders 16–6. **Drive: 13 plays, 74 yards, 8:45.**

**Top passers**

- LV – Derek Carr – 15/24, 112 yards, TD
- CLE – Baker Mayfield – 12/25, 122 yards

**Top rushers**

- LV – Josh Jacobs – 31 rushes, 128 yards
- CLE – Kareem Hunt – 14 rushes, 66 yards

**Top receivers**

- LV – Darren Waller – 5 receptions, 28 yards
- CLE – Jarvis Landry – 4 receptions, 52 yards

The Browns returned home to take on the Las Vegas Raiders on a very windy afternoon. After a scoreless first quarter, Cleveland opened the scoring with a Cody Parkey 41-yard field goal to take a 3–0 lead. However, Las Vegas kicker Daniel Carlson connected on field goals from 29 and 33 yards to take a 6–3 lead at halftime. In the third quarter, Cleveland tied the game 6–6 on a Parkey 38-yard field goal. In the fourth quarter, Las Vegas scored the game's lone touchdown on a Derek Carr 4-yard pass to Hunter Renfrow to take a 13–6 lead. They extended their lead to 16–6 on a Carlson 24-yard field goal. Cleveland had a chance to close the Las Vegas lead to one possession with just under two minutes remaining, but Parkey missed a field goal attempt.

With the loss, the Browns went into their bye week at 5–3.

==== Week 10: vs. Houston Texans ====
Week Ten: Houston Texans at Cleveland Browns – Game summary

Quarter	1	2	3	4	Total
Texans	0	0	0	7	**7**
**Browns**	3	0	0	7	**10**

at FirstEnergy Stadium, Cleveland, Ohio

- Date: November 15
- Game time: 1:37 pm. EST
- Game weather: Rainy, 59 °F (15 °C)
- Game attendance: 10,613
- Referee: Ronald Torbert
- TV announcers (Fox): Dick Stockton, Matt Millen and Sara Walsh
- Recap, Game Book

Game information

**First quarter**

- CLE – Cody Parkey 41-yard field goal, 8:27. Browns 3–0. **Drive: 12 plays, 52 yards, 6:33.**

**Second quarter**

- No scoring plays.

**Third quarter**

- No scoring plays.

**Fourth quarter**

- CLE – Nick Chubb 9-yard run, 13:32. Browns 10–0. **Drive: 9 plays, 64 yards, 5:01.**
- HOU – Pharaoh Brown 16-yard pass from Deshaun Watson (Kaʻimi Fairbairn kick), 4:59. Browns 10–7. **Drive: 7 plays, 90 yards, 2:52.**

**Top passers**

- HOU – Deshaun Watson – 20/30, 163 yards, TD
- CLE – Baker Mayfield – 12/20, 132 yards

**Top rushers**

- HOU – Duke Johnson – 14 rushes, 54 yards
- CLE – Nick Chubb – 19 rushes, 126 yards, TD

**Top receivers**

- HOU – Randall Cobb – 3 receptions, 41 yards
- CLE – Rashard Higgins – 3 receptions, 48 yards

The Browns returned from their bye week to host the Houston Texans. The game was delayed moments before kickoff due to severe weather including high winds, severe rain, and hail. The game started after a 36-minute delay. The Browns took the opening drive of the game 12 plays and scored on a Cody Parkey 41-yard field goal take an early 3–0 lead. This was the only score until the fourth quarter as high winds made it very difficult for either offense to establish any consistency. Early in the fourth quarter, the Browns extended their lead to 10–0 on a 9-yard touchdown run by Nick Chubb in his first game since suffering a knee injury in Week 4. Houston responded with a Deshaun Watson 16-yard touchdown pass to Pharaoh Brown to close the Browns' lead to 10–7. However, the Browns were able to run out the clock as Chubb and Kareem Hunt rushed for four first downs to seal the 10–7 win.

With the win, the Browns improved to 6–3. In the game, Chubb and Hunt became the first pair of Browns teammates to each rush for 100 yards in the same game since Ernie Green and Leroy Kelly in 1966. This win marked Baker Mayfield's 12th win as starting quarterback at FirstEnergy Stadium, setting a record for the most wins at the venue. The previous record of 11 wins was held by Ben Roethlisberger. Offensive tackle Jedrick Wills was named NFL Rookie of the Week.

==== Week 11: vs. Philadelphia Eagles ====
Week Eleven: Philadelphia Eagles at Cleveland Browns – Game summary

Quarter	1	2	3	4	Total
Eagles	0	0	7	10	**17**
**Browns**	0	7	5	10	**22**

at FirstEnergy Stadium, Cleveland, Ohio

- Date: November 22
- Game time: 1:00 pm. EST
- Game weather: Rain, 38 °F (3 °C)
- Game attendance: 11,133
- Referee: Adrian Hill
- TV announcers (Fox): Adam Amin, Mark Schlereth and Lindsay Czarniak
- Recap, Game Book

Game information

**First quarter**

- No scoring plays.

**Second quarter**

- CLE – Sione Takitaki 50-yard interception return (Cody Parkey kick), 13:35. Browns 7–0.

**Third quarter**

- PHI – Richard Rodgers 19-yard pass from Carson Wentz (Jake Elliott kick), 11:53. Tied 7–7. **Drive: 1 play, 19 yards, 0:06.**
- CLE – Cody Parkey 46-yard field goal, 8:59. Browns 10–7. **Drive: 5 plays, 47 yards, 2:54.**
- CLE – Carson Wentz sacked in the end zone by Olivier Vernon, 3:11. Browns 12–7.

**Fourth quarter**

- PHI – Jake Elliott 43-yard field goal, 11:24. Browns 12–10. **Drive: 7 plays, 38 yards, 2:30.**
- CLE – Kareem Hunt 5-yard run (Cody Parkey kick), 9:13. Browns 19–10. **Drive: 4 plays, 79 yards, 2:11.**
- CLE – Cody Parkey 28-yard field goal, 3:49. Browns 22–10. **Drive: 10 plays, 43 yards, 4:32.**
- PHI – Dallas Goedert 4-yard pass from Carson Wentz (Jake Elliott kick), 0:30. Browns 22–17. **Drive: 8 plays, 47 yards, 1:09.**

**Top passers**

- PHI – Carson Wentz – 21/35, 235 yards, 2 TD, 2 INT
- CLE – Baker Mayfield – 12/22, 204 yards

**Top rushers**

- PHI – Miles Sanders – 16 rushes, 66 yards
- CLE – Nick Chubb – 20 rushes, 114 yards

**Top receivers**

- PHI – Dallas Goedert – 5 receptions, 77 yards, TD
- CLE – KhaDarel Hodge – 3 receptions, 73 yards

The Browns stayed home to take on the Philadelphia Eagles. The game started slowly as neither team scored in the first quarter despite each team missing an opportunity within the opponent's 5-yard line; Philadelphia's drive ended on a Miles Sanders fumble, while Cleveland was stopped on fourth down at the goal line. Cleveland opened the scoring in the second quarter on a Sione Takitaki 50-yard interception return to take a 7–0 lead into halftime. In the third quarter, Philadelphia tied the game on a Carson Wentz 19-yard touchdown pass to Richard Rodgers. Cleveland took a 10–7 lead on their next drive with a Cody Parkey 46-yard field goal and extended it to 12–7 on a safety by linebacker Olivier Vernon. In the fourth quarter, Philadelphia made it 12–10 on a Jake Elliott 43-yard field goal. Cleveland extended their lead to 22–10 with a Kareem Hunt 5-yard touchdown run and a Parkey 28-yard field goal. Philadelphia made it 22–17 on a Wentz 4-yard touchdown pass to Dallas Goedert in the final minute, but could not recover their onside kick attempt, allowing Cleveland to run out the clock.

With the win, the Browns improved to 7–3, marking their best ten-game start since 1994. Vernon was named AFC Defensive Player of the Week after recording three sacks and a safety.

==== Week 12: at Jacksonville Jaguars ====
Week Twelve: Cleveland Browns at Jacksonville Jaguars – Game summary

Quarter	1	2	3	4	Total
**Browns**	7	10	3	7	**27**
Jaguars	3	10	6	6	**25**

at TIAA Bank Field, Jacksonville, Florida

- Date: November 29
- Game time: 1:00 pm. EST
- Game weather: Partly cloudy, 70 °F (21 °C)
- Game attendance: 15,926
- Referee: Jerome Boger
- TV announcers (CBS): Spero Dedes and Adam Archuleta
- Recap, Game Book

Game information

**First quarter**

- JAX – Aldrick Rosas 54-yard field goal, 6:35. Jaguars 3–0. **Drive: 6 plays, 14 yards, 3:11.**
- CLE – Jarvis Landry 5-yard pass from Baker Mayfield (Cody Parkey kick), 3:40. Browns 7–3. **Drive: 5 plays, 55 yards, 2:55.**

**Second quarter**

- JAX – Aldrick Rosas 24-yard field goal, 13:37. Browns 7–6. **Drive: 11 plays, 69 yards, 5:03.**
- CLE – Cody Parkey 24-yard field goal, 7:03. Browns 10–6. **Drive: 14 plays, 69 yards, 6:34.**
- JAX – Collin Johnson 46-yard pass from Mike Glennon (Aldrick Rosas kick), 4:14. Jaguars 13–10. **Drive: 5 plays, 77 yards, 2:49.**
- CLE – Austin Hooper 9-yard pass from Baker Mayfield (Cody Parkey kick), 1:10. Browns 17–13. **Drive: 8 plays, 84 yards, 3:04.**

**Third quarter**

- JAX – Tyler Eifert 2-yard pass from Mike Glennon (pass failed), 11:41. Jaguars 19–17. **Drive: 6 plays, 30 yards, 3:07.**
- CLE – Cody Parkey 45-yard field goal, 6:45. Browns 20–19. **Drive: 10 plays, 38 yards, 4:56.**

**Fourth quarter**

- CLE – Nick Chubb 1-yard run (Cody Parkey kick), 14:13. Browns 27–19. **Drive: 8 plays, 90 yards, 3:57.**
- JAX – James Robinson 4-yard run (pass failed), 2:14. Browns 27–25. **Drive: 11 plays, 78 yards, 3:15.**

**Top passers**

- CLE – Baker Mayfield – 19/29, 258 yards, 2 TD
- JAX – Mike Glennon – 20/35, 235 yards, 2 TD

**Top rushers**

- CLE – Nick Chubb – 19 rushes, 144 yards, TD
- JAX – James Robinson – 22 rushes, 128 yards, TD

**Top receivers**

- CLE – Jarvis Landry – 8 receptions, 143 yards, TD
- JAX – Collin Johnson – 4 receptions, 96 yards, TD

The Browns traveled to Jacksonville to take on the Jaguars. Jacksonville opened the scoring in the first quarter with an Aldrick Rosas field goal to take a 3–0 lead. Cleveland took a 7–3 lead on a Baker Mayfield touchdown pass to Jarvis Landry, Mayfield's first touchdown pass since Week 7. After both teams kicked short field goals in the second quarter, Jacksonville took a 13–10 lead on a 46-yard touchdown pass from Mike Glennon to Collin Johnson. Cleveland answered and took a 17–13 lead on a Mayfield touchdown pass to Austin Hooper. In the third quarter, Jacksonville recovered a Harrison Bryant fumble and scored a touchdown six plays later on a Glennon 2-yard pass to Tyler Eifert to take a 19–17 lead following a missed 2-point conversion attempt. Cleveland responded with a Cody Parkey 46-yard field goal and a Nick Chubb 1-yard touchdown run to take a 27–19 lead. Jacksonville closed the Browns' lead to 27–25 with just over two minutes to go on a James Robinson 4-yard touchdown run, but failed to make a game-tying 2-point conversion. The Browns were able to run out the clock to preserve the win.

With the win, the Browns improved to 8–3 and clinched their first non-losing season since 2007. In the game, Browns' chief of staff Callie Brownson became the first woman to serve as a position coach in NFL history. She filled in as the tight ends coach in place of Drew Petzing, as he did not travel with the team in order to attend the birth of his child.

==== Week 13: at Tennessee Titans ====
Week Thirteen: Cleveland Browns at Tennessee Titans – Game summary

Quarter	1	2	3	4	Total
**Browns**	10	28	3	0	**41**
Titans	0	7	14	14	**35**

at Nissan Stadium, Nashville, Tennessee

- Date: December 6
- Game time: 1:00 pm. EST/12:00 pm. CST
- Game weather: Sunny, 52 °F (11 °C)
- Game attendance: 13,986
- Referee: Clete Blakeman
- TV announcers (CBS): Ian Eagle, Charles Davis and Evan Washburn
- Recap, Game Book

Game information

**First quarter**

- CLE – Cody Parkey 27-yard field goal, 10:47. Browns 3–0. **Drive: 8 plays, 66 yards, 4:17.**
- CLE – Jarvis Landry 2-yard pass from Baker Mayfield (Cody Parkey kick), 3:19. Browns 10–0. **Drive: 9 plays, 59 yards, 4:32.**

**Second quarter**

- CLE – Kendall Lamm 1-yard pass from Baker Mayfield (Cody Parkey kick), 14:56. Browns 17–0. **Drive: 6 plays, 21 yards, 3:13.**
- TEN – Corey Davis 17-yard pass from Ryan Tannehill (Stephen Gostkowski kick), 13:14. Browns 17–7. **Drive: 4 plays, 74 yards, 1:42.**
- CLE – Donovan Peoples-Jones 75-yard pass from Baker Mayfield (Cody Parkey kick), 13:04. Browns 24–7. **Drive: 1 play, 75 yards, 0:10.**
- CLE – Rashard Higgins 17-yard pass from Baker Mayfield (Cody Parkey kick), 5:46. Browns 31–7. **Drive: 11 plays, 90 yards, 5:38.**
- CLE – Nick Chubb 1-yard run (Cody Parkey kick), 0:55. Browns 38–7. **Drive: 9 plays, 65 yards, 3:22.**

**Third quarter**

- TEN – MyCole Pruitt 22-yard pass from Ryan Tannehill (run failed), 13:52. Browns 38–13. **Drive: 3 plays, 75 yards, 1:08.**
- TEN – MyCole Pruitt 3-yard fumble recovery (Ryan Tannehill run), 9:15. Browns 38–21. **Drive: 6 plays, 61 yards, 2:10.**
- CLE – Cody Parkey 43-yard field goal, 5:33. Browns 41–21. **Drive: 8 plays, 50 yards, 3:39.**

**Fourth quarter**

- TEN – Jeremy McNichols 1-yard run (Stephen Gostkowski kick), 1:23. Browns 41–28. **Drive: 15 plays, 91 yards, 4:20.**
- TEN – Cameron Batson 8-yard pass from Ryan Tannehill (Stephen Gostkowski kick), 0:28. Browns 41–35. **Drive: 4 plays, 13 yards, 0:20.**

**Top passers**

- CLE – Baker Mayfield – 25/33, 334 yards, 4 TD
- TEN – Ryan Tannehill – 29/45, 389 yards, 3 TD, INT

**Top rushers**

- CLE – Nick Chubb – 18 rushes, 80 yards, TD
- TEN – Derrick Henry – 15 rushes, 60 yards

**Top receivers**

- CLE – Rashard Higgins – 6 receptions, 95 yards, TD
- TEN – Corey Davis – 11 receptions, 182 yards, TD

The Browns stayed on the road in Week 13 as they traveled to Nashville to take on the Tennessee Titans. The Browns scored first with a Cody Parkey 27-yard field goal and followed it up with a Baker Mayfield 2-yard touchdown pass to Jarvis Landry to take a 10–0 lead after the first quarter. The Browns extended their lead to 17–0 on a Mayfield 1-yard touchdown pass to Kendall Lamm. Tennessee got on the board with a Ryan Tannehill 17-yard touchdown pass to Corey Davis to make it 17–7, but Cleveland struck back to make it 24–7 on the first play of their next drive with a Mayfield 75-yard touchdown pass to Donovan Peoples-Jones. Cleveland scored two more touchdowns on a Mayfield pass to Rashard Higgins and a Nick Chubb run to take a 38–7 lead into halftime.

Tennessee would mount a comeback in the second half. In the first six minutes of the third quarter, Tennessee scored two touchdowns on a Tannehill pass to MyCole Pruitt and an offensive fumble recovery advanced by Pruitt to reduce Cleveland's lead to 38–21. Another Parkey field goal made it 41–21 going into the fourth quarter. The Titans closed the score to 41–28 with 1:23 remaining on a Jeremy McNichols 1-yard touchdown run. After a Mayfield fumble, Tennessee scored another touchdown on an 8-yard pass from Tannehill to Cameron Batson to cut the Browns' lead to 41–35 with 0:28 remaining. However, the Browns recovered the ensuing onside kick and ran out the clock.

With the win, the Browns improved to 9–3 and clinched their first winning season since 2007. In the game, Mayfield became the first Browns quarterback to throw four touchdown passes in the first half since Otto Graham in 1951. The Browns' 38 points in the first half also set a franchise record. Mayfield was named FedEx Air Player of the Week.

==== Week 14: vs. Baltimore Ravens ====
Week Fourteen: Baltimore Ravens at Cleveland Browns – Game summary

Quarter	1	2	3	4	Total
**Ravens**	7	14	13	13	**47**
Browns	7	7	6	22	**42**

at FirstEnergy Stadium, Cleveland, Ohio

- Date: December 14
- Game time: 8:15 pm. EST
- Game weather: Cloudy, 34 °F (1 °C)
- Game attendance: 11,974
- Referee: Bill Vinovich
- TV announcers (ESPN): Steve Levy, Brian Griese, Louis Riddick and Lisa Salters
- Recap, Game Book

Game information

**First quarter**

- CLE – Nick Chubb 7-yard run (Cody Parkey kick), 9:06. Browns 7–0. **Drive: 11 plays, 81 yards, 5:54.**
- BAL – Lamar Jackson 5-yard run (Justin Tucker kick), 3:04. Tied 7–7. **Drive: 9 plays, 73 yards, 6:02.**

**Second quarter**

- BAL – Gus Edwards 11-yard run (Justin Tucker kick), 7:49. Ravens 14–7. **Drive: 8 plays, 80 yards, 4:41.**
- CLE – Nick Chubb 14-yard run (Cody Parkey kick), 4:16. Tied 14–14. **Drive: 7 plays, 75 yards, 3:33.**
- BAL – Lamar Jackson 17-yard run (Justin Tucker kick), 0:30. Ravens 21–14. **Drive: 4 plays, 56 yards, 0:31.**

**Third quarter**

- BAL – Gus Edwards 19-yard run (Justin Tucker kick), 12:47. Ravens 28–14. **Drive: 4 plays, 75 yards, 2:13.**
- CLE – Kareem Hunt 5-yard run (kick failed), 9:06. Ravens 28–20. **Drive: 11 plays, 75 yards, 3:41.**
- BAL – J. K. Dobbins 1-yard run (kick failed), 4:21. Ravens 34–20. **Drive: 1 play, 1 yard, 0:03.**

**Fourth quarter**

- CLE – Rashard Higgins 21-yard pass from Baker Mayfield (Baker Mayfield–Donovan Peoples-Jones pass), 13:36. Ravens 34–28. **Drive: 12 plays, 75 yards, 5:45.**
- CLE – Baker Mayfield 5-yard run (Cody Parkey kick), 6:33. Browns 35–34. **Drive: 12 plays, 70 yards, 6:13.**
- BAL – Marquise Brown 44-yard pass from Lamar Jackson (J. K. Dobbins run), 1:51. Ravens 42–35. **Drive: 9 plays, 79 yards, 4:42.**
- CLE – Kareem Hunt 22-yard pass from Baker Mayfield (Cody Parkey kick), 1:04. Tied 42–42. **Drive: 4 plays, 75 yards, 0:47.**
- BAL – Justin Tucker 55-yard field goal, 0:02. Ravens 45–42. **Drive: 6 plays, 38 yards, 1:02.**
- BAL – Jarvis Landry pushed out-of-bounds in endzone by Marlon Humphrey, 0:00. Ravens 47–42.

**Top passers**

- BAL – Lamar Jackson – 11/17, 163 yards, TD
- CLE – Baker Mayfield – 28/47, 343 yards, 2 TD, INT

**Top rushers**

- BAL – Lamar Jackson – 9 rushes, 124 yards, 2 TD
- CLE – Nick Chubb – 17 rushes, 82 yards, 2 TD

**Top receivers**

- BAL – Mark Andrews – 5 receptions, 78 yards
- CLE – Kareem Hunt – 6 receptions, 77 yards, TD

The Browns returned home for round two of their rivalry game with the Baltimore Ravens on Monday Night Football, hoping to avenge their Week 1 blowout loss. Each team scored a touchdown in the first quarter, Cleveland on a Nick Chubb run and Baltimore on a Lamar Jackson run to make the score 7–7. The teams exchanged rushing touchdowns again in the second quarter by Gus Edwards for Baltimore and Chubb for Cleveland to make it 14–14. Jackson added a 17-yard touchdown run to give Baltimore a 21–14 halftime lead. Baltimore built their lead to 28–14 on an Edwards 19-yard run, But Cleveland came to within 28–20 on a Kareem Hunt 5-yard run. Baltimore extended their lead to 34–20 on J. K. Dobbins' run following a Mayfield interception that was returned to the Browns' 1-yard line.

The Browns were able to take a 35–34 lead in the fourth quarter on a Baker Mayfield touchdown pass to Rashard Higgins and a Mayfield touchdown run. Meanwhile, Jackson left the game for Baltimore due to an injury and backup Trace McSorley came in and struggled against the Browns' defense. After the two-minute warning, Jackson returned to the game and threw a 44-yard touchdown pass to Marquise Brown to take a 42–35 lead after a successful 2-point conversion. Mayfield led the Browns to a touchdown drive culminating in a touchdown pass to Kareem Hunt with just over a minute left. However, Baltimore kicker Justin Tucker kicked a game-winning 55-yard field goal with 0:02 remaining to go up 45–42. Baltimore added a safety on a failed hook-and-ladder play by Cleveland to make the final score 47–42.

With the loss, the Browns fell to 9–4. The Browns and Ravens combined for nine rushing touchdowns in the game, tying an NFL record.

==== Week 15: at New York Giants ====
Week Fifteen: Cleveland Browns at New York Giants – Game summary

Quarter	1	2	3	4	Total
**Browns**	0	13	0	7	**20**
Giants	3	0	0	3	**6**

at MetLife Stadium, East Rutherford, New Jersey

- Date: December 20
- Game time: 8:20 pm. EST
- Game weather: Overcast, 36 °F (2 °C)
- Game attendance: 0
- Referee: Shawn Hochuli
- TV announcers (NBC): Mike Tirico, Cris Collinsworth, Michele Tafoya and Terry McAulay
- Recap, Game Book

Game information

**First quarter**

- NYG – Graham Gano 37-yard field goal, 4:12. Giants 3–0. **Drive: 7 plays, 38 yards, 2:53.**

**Second quarter**

- CLE – Austin Hooper 2-yard pass from Baker Mayfield (Cody Parkey kick), 12:31. Browns 7–3. **Drive: 13 plays, 75 yards, 6:41.**
- CLE – Jarvis Landry 2-yard pass from Baker Mayfield (kick failed), 0:21. Browns 13–3. **Drive: 10 plays, 95 yards, 4:55.**

**Third quarter**

- No scoring plays

**Fourth quarter**

- CLE – Nick Chubb 1-yard run (Cody Parkey kick), 12:53. Browns 20–3. **Drive: 14 plays, 95 yards, 8:04.**
- NYG – Graham Gano 39 yard field goal, 4:07. Browns 20–6. **Drive: 9 plays, 56 yards, 2:18.**

**Top passers**

- CLE – Baker Mayfield – 27/32, 297 yards, 2 TD
- NYG – Colt McCoy – 19/31, 221 yards

**Top rushers**

- CLE – Nick Chubb – 15 rushes, 50 yards, TD
- NYG – Alfred Morris – 7 rushes, 39 yards

**Top receivers**

- CLE – Rashard Higgins – 4 receptions, 76 yards
- NYG – Darius Slayton – 2 receptions, 56 yards

The Browns traveled to East Rutherford, New Jersey, to take on the New York Giants in a key Week 15 contest on Sunday Night Football. After both teams had promising drives that ended on a turnover on downs in the opponent's territory, the Giants struck first with a Graham Gano 37-yard field goal. Cleveland responded with two-second quarter touchdowns on Baker Mayfield passes to Austin Hooper and Jarvis Landry to take a 13–3 lead as Browns kicker Cody Parkey missed one of the extra point attempts. The Browns extended their lead to 20–3 on a Nick Chubb touchdown run early in the fourth quarter. The Giants added another Gano field goal to make it 20–6 but could not get any closer.

With the win, the Browns improved to 10–4.

==== Week 16: at New York Jets ====
Week Sixteen: Cleveland Browns at New York Jets – Game summary

Quarter	1	2	3	4	Total
Browns	3	0	7	6	**16**
**Jets**	7	6	7	3	**23**

at MetLife Stadium, East Rutherford, New Jersey

- Date: December 27
- Game time: 1:00 pm. EDT
- Game weather: Sunny and cold, 37 °F (3 °C)
- Game attendance: 0
- Referee: Land Clark
- TV announcers (CBS): Kevin Harlan, Trent Green and AJ Ross
- Recap, Game Book

Game information

**First quarter**

- CLE – Cody Parkey 44-yard field goal, 9:26. Browns 3–0. **Drive: 9 plays, 34 yards, 3:53.**
- NYJ – Braxton Berrios 43-yard pass from Jamison Crowder (Sam Ficken kick), 0:34. Jets 7–3. **Drive: 5 plays, 66 yards, 2:19.**

**Second quarter**

- NYJ – Chris Herndon 11-yard pass from Sam Darnold (kick blocked), 13:33. Jets 13–3. **Drive: 4 plays, 30 yards, 1:21.**

**Third quarter**

- NYJ – Jamison Crowder 30-yard pass from Sam Darnold (Sam Ficken kick), 10:26. Jets 20–3. **Drive: 8 plays, 75 yards, 4:34.**
- CLE – Nick Chubb 1-yard run (Cody Parkey kick), 2:56. Jets 20–10. **Drive: 9 plays, 60 yards, 2:45.**

**Fourth quarter**

- CLE – Kareem Hunt 4-yard run (kick failed), 12:38. Jets 20–16. **Drive: 12 plays, 83 yards, 2:43.**
- NYJ – Sam Ficken 34-yard field goal, 2:52. Jets 23–16. **Drive: 4 plays, 1 yard, 0:22.**

**Top passers**

- CLE – Baker Mayfield – 28/53, 285 yards
- NYJ – Sam Darnold – 16/32, 175 yards, 2 TD

**Top rushers**

- CLE – Nick Chubb – 11 rushes, 28 yards, TD
- NYJ – Frank Gore – 14 rushes, 48 yards

**Top receivers**

- CLE – Austin Hooper – 7 receptions, 71 yards
- NYJ – Jamison Crowder – 7 receptions, 92 yards, TD

The Browns returned to East Rutherford to take on the New York Jets. The day prior to the game, much of the Browns' receiving corps, namely Rashard Higgins, KhaDarel Hodge, Jarvis Landry, and Donovan Peoples-Jones, was placed on the Reserve/COVID-19 list, forcing Cleveland to play three receivers with very little experience on the team. The Browns were forced to rely mainly on their running backs and tight ends in the passing game.

Cleveland took an early 3–0 lead on a Cody Parkey 44-yard field goal. However, New York scored a pair of touchdowns on a Jamison Crowder pass to Braxton Berrios and a Sam Darnold pass to Chris Herndon to take a 13–3 lead into halftime. New York extended its lead to 20–3 on a 30-yard pass from Darnold to Crowder. Cleveland added a pair of touchdowns to come within 20–16 on runs by Nick Chubb and Kareem Hunt. After New York added a Sam Ficken 34-yard field goal to extend their lead to 23–16 with just under 3:00 remaining, the Browns drove to the New York 16-yard line before turning the ball over on downs, effectively ending the game.

With the loss, the Browns fell to 10–5. They finished 5–3 in away games. The Browns' loss also allowed the Pittsburgh Steelers to clinch the AFC North title. This is the Browns' 28th consecutive season without a division title, the longest active streak in the NFL.

==== Week 17: vs. Pittsburgh Steelers ====
Week Seventeen: Pittsburgh Steelers at Cleveland Browns – Game summary

Quarter	1	2	3	4	Total
Steelers	0	6	3	13	**22**
**Browns**	7	3	7	7	**24**

at FirstEnergy Stadium, Cleveland, Ohio

- Date: January 3, 2021
- Game time: 1:00 pm. EST
- Game weather: Cloudy, 38 °F (3 °C)
- Game attendance: 11,989
- Referee: Jerome Boger
- TV announcers (CBS): Ian Eagle, Charles Davis and Evan Washburn
- Recap, Game Book

Game information

**First quarter**

- CLE – Nick Chubb 47-yard run (Cody Parkey kick), 9:29. Browns 7–0. **Drive: 6 plays, 85 yards, 2:41.**

**Second quarter**

- CLE – Cody Parkey 23-yard field goal, 9:45. Browns 10–0. **Drive: 10 plays, 70 yards, 4:20.**
- PIT – Matthew Wright 29-yard field goal, 4:10. Browns 10–3. **Drive: 11 plays, 66 yards, 5:35.**
- PIT – Matthew Wright 46-yard field goal, 1:07. Browns 10–6. **Drive: 8 plays, 48 yards, 1:18.**

**Third quarter**

- PIT – Matthew Wright 46-yard field goal, 8:29. Browns 10–9. **Drive: 7 plays, 52 yards, 2:51.**
- CLE – Austin Hooper 2-yard pass from Baker Mayfield (Cody Parkey kick), 3:48. Browns 17–9. **Drive: 8 plays, 76 yards, 4:41.**

**Fourth quarter**

- CLE – Jarvis Landry 3-yard run (Cody Parkey kick), 14:57. Browns 24–9. **Drive: 4 plays, 20 yards, 1:34.**
- PIT – Chase Claypool 28-yard pass from Mason Rudolph (Matthew Wright kick), 10:07. Browns 24–16. **Drive: 13 plays, 75 yards, 4:50.**
- PIT – JuJu Smith-Schuster 2-yard pass from Mason Rudolph (pass failed), 1:23. Browns 24–22. **Drive: 7 plays, 65 yards, 2:14.**

**Top passers**

- PIT – Mason Rudolph – 22/39, 315 yards, 2 TD, INT
- CLE – Baker Mayfield – 17/27, 196 yards, TD

**Top rushers**

- PIT – James Conner – 9 rushes, 37 yards
- CLE – Nick Chubb – 14 rushes, 108 yards, TD

**Top receivers**

- PIT – Chase Claypool – 5 receptions, 101 yards, TD
- CLE – Rashard Higgins – 2 receptions, 55 yards

The Browns hosted the rival Pittsburgh Steelers in the regular season finale. Cleveland would clinch a playoff berth with a win. Meanwhile, Pittsburgh had already clinched the AFC North division and would rest several starters including quarterback Ben Roethlisberger.

The Browns scored the only points in the first quarter on a Nick Chubb 47-yard touchdown run to take a 7–0 lead. Cody Parkey chipped in a 23-yard field goal to make it 10–0. Matthew Wright then kicked field goals of 29 and 46 yards, to close the Browns' lead to 10–6 at halftime. Wright added another 46-yard field goal early in the third quarter to make it 10–9. The Browns added to their lead on a pair of touchdowns, a Baker Mayfield 2-yard pass to Austin Hooper and a Jarvis Landry 3-yard run, to extend their lead to 24–9 early in the fourth quarter. However the Steelers mounted a comeback as backup quarterback Mason Rudolph connected on touchdown passes to Chase Claypool and JuJu Smith-Schuster to make it 24–22 with 1:22 remaining. However the Steelers could not convert the game-tying two-point conversion nor recover an onside kick. The Browns were able to run out the clock for the win.

With the win, the Browns finished the season 11–5, their best record since 1994. The Browns clinched a spot in the playoffs for the first time since 2002, ending the longest active playoff drought in the NFL. The Browns finished the season 6–2 at home.

=== Standings ===
==== Division ====
AFC North
	W	L	T	PCT	DIV	CONF	PF	PA	STK
^{(3)} Pittsburgh Steelers	12	4	0	.750	4–2	9–3	416	312	L1
^{(5)} Baltimore Ravens	11	5	0	.688	4–2	7–5	468	303	W5
^{(6)} Cleveland Browns	11	5	0	.688	3–3	7–5	408	419	W1
Cincinnati Bengals	4	11	1	.281	1–5	4–8	311	424	L1

==== Conference ====
AFC
#	Team	Division	W	L	T	PCT	DIV	CONF	SOS	SOV	STK
**Division leaders**
1	Kansas City Chiefs	West	14	2	0	.875	4–2	10–2	.465	.464	L1
2	Buffalo Bills	East	13	3	0	.813	6–0	10–2	.512	.471	W6
3	Pittsburgh Steelers	North	12	4	0	.750	4–2	9–3	.475	.448	L1
4 (Note: Tennessee finished ahead of Indianapolis in the AFC South based on division record.)	Tennessee Titans	South	11	5	0	.688	5–1	8–4	.475	.398	W1
**Wild cards**
5 (Note: Baltimore claimed the No. 5 seed over Indianapolis based on head-to-head victory. Division tiebreaker used to eliminate Cleveland (see below).) (Note: Baltimore claimed the No. 5 seed over Cleveland based on head-to-head sweep.)	Baltimore Ravens	North	11	5	0	.688	4–2	7–5	.494	.401	W5
6 (Note: Cleveland claimed the No. 6 seed over Indianapolis based on head-to-head victory.)	Cleveland Browns	North	11	5	0	.688	3–3	7–5	.451	.406	W1
7	Indianapolis Colts	South	11	5	0	.688	4–2	7–5	.443	.384	W1
**Did not qualify for the postseason**
8	Miami Dolphins	East	10	6	0	.625	3–3	7–5	.467	.347	L1
9	Las Vegas Raiders	West	8	8	0	.500	4–2	6–6	.539	.477	W1
10 (Note: New England finished ahead of the LA Chargers based on head-to-head victory.)	New England Patriots	East	7	9	0	.438	3–3	6–6	.527	.429	W1
11	Los Angeles Chargers	West	7	9	0	.438	3–3	6–6	.482	.344	W4
12	Denver Broncos	West	5	11	0	.313	1–5	4–8	.566	.388	L3
13	Cincinnati Bengals	North	4	11	1	.281	1–5	4–8	.529	.438	L1
14	Houston Texans	South	4	12	0	.250	2–4	3–9	.541	.219	L5
15	New York Jets	East	2	14	0	.125	0–6	1–11	.594	.656	L1
16	Jacksonville Jaguars	South	1	15	0	.063	1–5	1–11	.549	.688	L15
**Tiebreakers** (Note: When breaking ties for three or more teams under the NFL's rules, they are first broken within divisions, then comparing only the highest ranked remaining team from each division.)

=== Team leaders ===
==== Regular season ====
Category	Player(s)	Value
Passing yards	Baker Mayfield	3,563
Passing touchdowns	Baker Mayfield	26
Rushing yards	Nick Chubb	1,067
Rushing touchdowns	Nick Chubb	12
Receptions	Jarvis Landry	72
Receiving yards	Jarvis Landry	840
Receiving touchdowns	Kareem Hunt	5
Points	Cody Parkey	100
Kickoff return yards	Donovan Peoples-Jones	379
Punt return yards	Donovan Peoples-Jones	77
Tackles	B.J. Goodson	91
Sacks	Myles Garrett	12.0
Forced fumbles	Myles Garrett	4
Interceptions	3 players tied	2
Pass deflections	Denzel Ward	18

== Postseason ==
=== Schedule ===
Round	Date	Opponent (seed)	Result	Record	Venue	Recap
Wild Card	January 10, 2021	at Pittsburgh Steelers (3)	W 48–37	1–0	Heinz Field	Recap
Divisional	January 17, 2021	at Kansas City Chiefs (1)	L 17–22	1–1	Arrowhead Stadium	Recap

=== Game summaries ===
==== AFC Wild Card Playoffs: at (3) Pittsburgh Steelers ====
AFC Wild Card Playoffs: (6) Cleveland Browns at (3) Pittsburgh Steelers – Game summary

Quarter	1	2	3	4	Total
Browns	28	7	0	13	48
Steelers	0	10	13	14	37

at Heinz Field, Pittsburgh, Pennsylvania

- Date: January 10, 2021
- Game time: 8:15 p.m. EST
- Game weather: Clear, 34 °F (1 °C)
- Game attendance: 0
- Referee: Shawn Smith
- TV announcers (NBC/Peacock): Al Michaels, Cris Collinsworth, Michele Tafoya and Terry McAulay
- Recap, Game Book

Game information

First quarter

- CLE – Karl Joseph fumble recovery (Cody Parkey kick), 14:46. Browns 7–0.
- CLE – Jarvis Landry 40-yard pass from Baker Mayfield (Cody Parkey kick), 9:46. Browns 14–0. Drive: 3 plays, 46 yards, 0:58.
- CLE – Kareem Hunt 11-yard run (Cody Parkey kick), 4:40. Browns 21–0. Drive: 6 plays, 65 yards, 3:00.
- CLE – Kareem Hunt 8-yard run (Cody Parkey kick), 1:56. Browns 28–0. Drive: 3 plays, 15 yards, 1:22.

Second quarter

- PIT – James Conner 1-yard run (Chris Boswell kick), 1:44. Browns 28–7. Drive: 13 plays, 89 yards, 5:36.
- CLE – Austin Hooper 7-yard pass from Baker Mayfield (Cody Parkey kick), 0:34. Browns 35–7. Drive: 9 plays, 64 yards, 1:10.
- PIT – Chris Boswell 49-yard field goal, 0:00. Browns 35–10. Drive: 5 plays, 37 yards, 0:34.

Third quarter

- PIT – Eric Ebron 17-yard pass from Ben Roethlisberger (pass failed), 7:22. Browns 35–16. Drive: 8 plays, 84 yards, 3:45.
- PIT – JuJu Smith-Schuster 5-yard pass from Ben Roethlisberger (Chris Boswell kick), 2:57. Browns 35–23. Drive: 12 plays, 68 yards, 3:25.

Fourth quarter

- CLE – Nick Chubb 40-yard pass from Baker Mayfield (Cody Parkey kick), 12:32. Browns 42–23. Drive: 6 plays, 80 yards, 2:20.
- PIT – Chase Claypool 29-yard pass from Ben Roethlisberger (pass failed), 11:08. Browns 42–29. Drive: 4 plays, 76 yards, 1:24.
- CLE – Cody Parkey 24-yard field goal, 4:28. Browns 45–29. Drive: 13 plays, 59 yards, 6:40.
- CLE – Cody Parkey 37-yard field goal, 2:51. Browns 48–29. Drive: 4 plays, 6 yards, 0:25.
- PIT – Chase Claypool 7-yard pass from Ben Roethlisberger (Ben Roethlisberger–James Conner pass), 1:09. Browns 48–37. Drive: 8 plays, 77 yards, 1:42.

Top passers

- CLE – Baker Mayfield – 21/34, 263 yards, 3 TD
- PIT – Ben Roethlisberger – 47/68, 501 yards, 4 TD, 4 INT

Top rushers

- CLE – Nick Chubb – 18 rushes, 76 yards
- PIT – James Conner – 11 rushes, 37 yards, TD

Top receivers

- CLE – Jarvis Landry – 5 receptions, 92 yards, TD
- PIT – JuJu Smith-Schuster – 13 receptions, 157 yards, TD

On January 5, head coach Kevin Stefanski, along with tight ends coach Drew Petzing, defensive backs coach Jeff Howard, offensive line coach Bill Callahan, assistant offensive line coach Scott Peters, offensive lineman Joel Bitonio, cornerbacks Denzel Ward and Kevin Johnson, and wide receiver KhaDarel Hodge, tested positive for COVID-19, removing them from coaching and playing in this game. Special Teams Coordinator Mike Priefer served as acting Head Coach.

The Browns got off to a very strong start. On the first play from scrimmage, the Browns' Karl Joseph recovered a Steelers fumble on an errant snap by Maurkice Pouncey in the end zone for a touchdown, giving the Browns an early 7–0 lead. The Browns built their lead to 28–0 by the end of the first quarter on a 40-yard pass from Baker Mayfield to Jarvis Landry and two Kareem Hunt touchdown runs of 11 and 8 yards after a Steelers punt and two Ben Roethlisberger interceptions. The Browns' 28 first quarter points tied an NFL playoff record. The Steelers got on the board in the second quarter on a James Conner 1-yard touchdown run, but the Browns would respond with a Mayfield 7-yard pass to Austin Hooper to make it 35–7. A Chris Boswell field goal at the end of the half made it 35–10.

The Steelers got back into the game with a dominant third quarter. The team had two scoring drives, capped off by Ben Roethlisberger touchdown passes to Eric Ebron and JuJu Smith-Schuster, to make it 35–23. However, the Browns added a touchdown on a Mayfield 40-yard screen pass to Nick Chubb to extend their lead to 42–23. Pittsburgh responded with a Roethlisberger 29-yard touchdown pass to Chase Claypool on its next drive, taking just over a minute off the clock, to make it 42–29. Cody Parkey then added two field goals for the Browns, the second one following Rothlisberger's fourth interception of the game, to extend their lead back to three possessions at 48–29. A late touchdown pass from Roethlisberger to Claypool made the final score 48–37.

With the win, the Browns advanced to the Divisional Round. The Browns recorded their first playoff win since 1994 and their first away playoff win since 1969, ending a streak of eight consecutive losses in away playoff games. This win also ended a 17-game losing streak in Pittsburgh that dated back to 2004. Jim Donovan, who called the game for the Cleveland Browns Radio Network, referred to the win as "one of the greatest victories in Cleveland Browns history".

==== AFC Divisional Playoffs: at (1) Kansas City Chiefs ====
AFC Divisional Playoff: (6) Cleveland Browns at (1) Kansas City Chiefs – Game summary

Quarter	1	2	3	4	Total
Browns	3	0	7	7	17
Chiefs	6	13	3	0	22

at Arrowhead Stadium, Kansas City, Missouri

- Date: January 17, 2021
- Game time: 3:05 pm. EST/2:05 p.m. CST
- Game weather: Cloudy, 40 °F (4 °C)
- Game attendance: 16,730
- Referee: Clay Martin
- TV announcers (CBS): Jim Nantz, Tony Romo, Tracy Wolfson, Evan Washburn, Jay Feely and Gene Steratore
- Recap, Game Book

Game information

First quarter

- KC – Patrick Mahomes 1-yard run (kick failed), 9:11. Chiefs 6–0. Drive: 10 plays, 75 yards, 5:49.
- CLE – Cody Parkey 46-yard field goal, 2:41. Chiefs 6–3. Drive: 12 plays, 47 yards, 6:30.

Second quarter

- KC – Travis Kelce 20-yard pass from Patrick Mahomes (Harrison Butker kick), 13:48. Chiefs 13–3. Drive: 7 plays, 75 yards, 3:53.
- KC – Harrison Butker 50-yard field goal, 3:09. Chiefs 16–3. Drive: 13 plays, 53 yards, 6:29.
- KC – Harrison Butker 28-yard field goal, 0:02. Chiefs 19–3. Drive: 9 plays, 70 yards, 1:32.

Third quarter

- CLE – Jarvis Landry 4-yard pass from Baker Mayfield (Cody Parkey kick), 9:29. Chiefs 19–10. Drive: 8 plays, 77 yards, 4:38.
- KC – Harrison Butker 33-yard field goal, 4:24. Chiefs 22–10. Drive: 11 plays, 60 yards, 5:05.

Fourth quarter

- CLE – Kareem Hunt 3-yard run (Cody Parkey kick), 11:07. Chiefs 22–17. Drive: 18 plays, 75 yards, 8:17.

Top passers

- CLE – Baker Mayfield – 23/37, 204 yards, TD, INT
- KC – Patrick Mahomes – 21/30, 255 yards, TD

Top rushers

- CLE – Nick Chubb – 13 carries, 69 yards
- KC – Darrel Williams – 13 carries, 78 yards

Top receivers

- CLE – Rashard Higgins – 5 receptions, 88 yards
- KC – Tyreek Hill – 8 receptions, 110 yards

The Browns traveled to Kansas City for a Divisional Round matchup with the #1 seed and defending Super Bowl Champion Kansas City Chiefs. Kansas City opened the scoring on their opening drive, as Patrick Mahomes completed 4 of 4 passes for 41 yards, including a 26-yard completion to Tyreek Hill, as the team scored on his 1-yard touchdown run to take a 6–0 lead. Cleveland responded with a 12-play, 47-yard scoring drive, featuring a 27-yard pass from Baker Mayfield to David Njoku. However, the Browns were forced to settle for a Cody Parkey 46-yard field goal to make the score 6–3. The Chiefs added a touchdown on a Mahomes 20-yard pass to Travis Kelce to build their lead to 13–3, then 16–3 on a Harrison Butker 50-yard field goal. Cleveland responded with drive deep into Kansas City territory, however Rashard Higgins fumbled the ball out of the end zone, resulting in a touchback for Kansas City. As he dived for the goal line, Kansas City safety Daniel Sorensen hit him from the left side, knocking the ball loose. Butker kicked a field goal on the ensuing drive, giving the Chiefs a 19–3 halftime lead.

The Browns cut the Chiefs' lead to 19–10 in the third quarter on a Mayfield 4-yard touchdown pass to Jarvis Landry that was set up by two Nick Chubb runs for 23 and 18 yards earlier in the drive. On the next Chiefs' drive, Mahomes was knocked out of the game with a concussion and backup quarterback Chad Henne came on in relief. The Chiefs kicked a field goal on that drive to extend their lead to 22–10. Cleveland responded with an 18-play, 75-yard drive culminating in a Kareem Hunt touchdown run in his first game against his former team, to make it 22–17. The Chiefs then drove into Browns' territory but Henne threw an interception to safety Karl Joseph in the end zone. Cleveland was forced to punt on its next drive, and Kansas City was able to run out the clock thanks to a 13-yard run by Henne on 3rd and 14, followed by a game-clinching 5-yard pass from Henne to Tyreek Hill.

With the loss, the Browns' season ended. They failed to advance to the AFC Championship game, which would have been their first since the 1989 season.

=== Team leaders ===
==== Postseason ====
Category	Player(s)	Value
Passing yards	Baker Mayfield	467
Passing touchdowns	Baker Mayfield	4
Rushing yards	Nick Chubb	145
Rushing touchdowns	Kareem Hunt	3
Receptions	Jarvis Landry	12
Receiving yards	Rashard Higgins	116
Receiving touchdowns	Jarvis Landry	2
Points	Kareem Hunt	18
Kickoff return yards	D'Ernest Johnson	120
Punt return yards	Donovan Peoples-Jones	8
Tackles	B.J. Goodson	16
Sacks	Myles Garrett	1.0
Forced fumbles	--	N/A
Interceptions	5 players tied	1
Pass deflections	Vincent Taylor	2

== Awards ==
The following Browns were awarded for their performances during the season:

=== AFC Offensive Player of the Week/Month ===
W/M	Player	Line
7	QB Baker Mayfield	22–28, 297 yds, 5 TD, INT

=== AFC Defensive Player of the Week/Month ===
W/M	Player	Line
4	DE Myles Garrett	3 TKL, TFL, 2.0 sacks, FF
Oct.	DE Myles Garrett	14 TKL, 4 TFL, 6.0 sacks, 2 FF
11	DE Olivier Vernon	5 TKL, 3 TFL, 3.0 sacks, SFTY, PD

=== 2021 Pro Bowl ===
On December 21, it was announced that G Joel Bitonio, RB Nick Chubb, and DE Myles Garrett were named to the AFC Pro Bowl roster, with Bitonio and Garrett named as starters. This marks the third Pro Bowl selection for Bitonio and the second for Chubb and Garrett.

=== All-Pro team ===
On January 8, it was announced that OT Jack Conklin and DE Myles Garrett were named to the Associated Press All-Pro first team. G Joel Bitonio and G Wyatt Teller were named to the All-Pro second team. This marks Bitonio's third All-Pro selection, Garrett and Conklin's second, and the first for Teller.

=== Coach of the Year ===
Head coach Kevin Stefanski was named the AP Coach of the Year.
