= Karl Joseph =

American football player (born 1993)

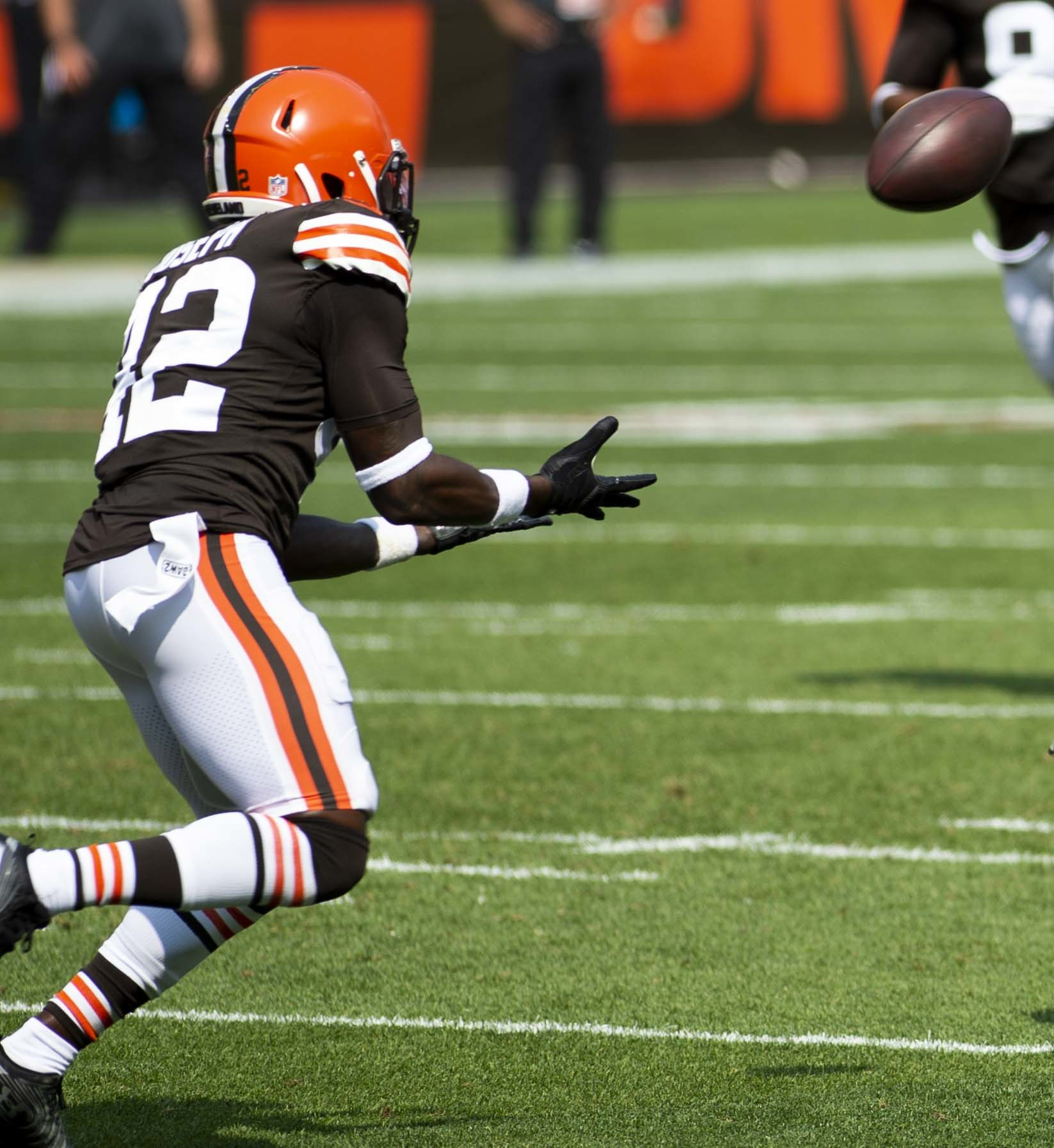
- Joseph with the Cleveland Browns in 2020

No. 8, 30, 42
- Position: Safety

Personal information
- Born: September 8, 1993 (age 33); Orlando, Florida, U.S.
- Listed height: 5 ft 10 in (1.78 m)
- Listed weight: 200 lb (91 kg)

Career information
- High school: Edgewater (Orlando)
- College: West Virginia (2012–2015)
- NFL draft: 2016: 1st round, 14th overall pick

Career history
- Oakland Raiders (2016–2019); Cleveland Browns (2020); Las Vegas Raiders (2021)*; Pittsburgh Steelers (2021–2022)
- * Offseason or practice squad member only

Awards and highlights
- PFWA All-Rookie Team (2016); Second-team All-American (2015); First-team All-Big 12 (2014)

Career NFL statistics
- Total tackles: 305
- Sacks: 3
- Forced fumbles: 1
- Fumble recoveries: 5
- Interceptions: 5
- Pass deflections: 20
- Stats at Pro Football Reference

Karl Myrthell Joseph (born September 8, 1993) is an American former professional football player who was a safety in the National Football League (NFL). He played college football for the West Virginia Mountaineers and was selected by the Oakland Raiders in the first round of the 2016 NFL draft. He has also played for the Cleveland Browns and Pittsburgh Steelers.

== Early life ==
Joseph attended Edgewater High School in Orlando, Florida. He committed to West Virginia University to play college football.

== College career ==
Joseph started all 13 games as a true freshman at West Virginia in 2012, recording 104 tackles, two interceptions, and one sack. He started all 12 games his sophomore year and had 68 tackles and one interception. He again started all 13 games as a junior in 2014, recording 92 tackles and one interception. Joseph started the first four games his senior year in 2015, before suffering a season-ending knee injury. At the time of the injury, he was leading the nation with five interceptions.

== Professional career ==
=== Pre-draft ===
Coming out of West Virginia, Joseph was projected by the majority of NFL draft experts and scouts to be a second or third round pick. He received an invitation to the NFL Combine, but was unable to perform any physical drills due to a knee injury he suffered in October. On April 4, 2016, he was among 22 prospects who performed at West Virginia's pro day, that included Wendell Smallwood, K. J. Dillon, Nick Kwiatkoski, and Daryl Worley. He performed the bench press and met with coaches, team representatives, and scouts from all 32 NFL teams, that included Pittsburgh Steelers head coach Mike Tomlin. Joseph was ranked the second best strong safety prospect in the draft by DraftScout.com and was ranked the seventh best defensive back prospect by Sports Illustrated.

External videos
- Karl Joseph's NFL Combine Workout
- Karl Joseph NFL Combine Interview

Pre-draft measurables
Height	Weight	Arm length	Hand span	Bench press
5 ft 9 5/8 in (1.77 m)	205 lb (93 kg)	32 1/8 in (0.82 m)	9 3/4 in (0.25 m)	19 reps
All values are from NFL Combine, except bench press from Pro Day

External videos
- Raiders draft Joseph 14th overall

=== Oakland Raiders ===
==== 2016 ====
The Oakland Raiders selected Joseph in the first round (14th overall) of the 2016 NFL draft. He was the first safety drafted in 2016. On May 10, 2016, the Raiders signed Joseph to a fully guaranteed four-year, $11.88 million contract with a signing bonus of $6.84 million.

Joseph competed with veterans T. J. Carrie and Nate Allen throughout training camp for the vacant starting strong safety role after the departure of Larry Asante. Head coach Jack Del Rio named Joseph the backup strong safety to Nate Allen to begin the 2016 season.

He made his professional regular season debut in the Raiders' season-opening 35–34 win at the New Orleans Saints. On September 25, 2016, Joseph made his first career start and recorded a season-high ten combined tackles in the Raiders' 17–10 victory at the Tennessee Titans. On October 9, 2016, he collected six combined tackles, defended a pass, and made his first career interception off of Philip Rivers during a 34–31 victory over the San Diego Chargers. During a Week 12 contest against the Houston Texans, Joseph recorded a season-high nine solo tackles in the Raiders' 27–20 victory. During a Week 13 matchup against the Buffalo Bills, Joseph collected four combined tackles, but left the game after suffering an apparent toe injury that would cause him to miss the last four games of the season (Weeks 14–17). He finished the season with 60 combined tackles (44 solo), six pass deflections, and intercepted one pass in 12 games and nine starts. He was named to the PFWA All-Rookie Team after a strong rookie season. Pro Football Focus gave him an overall grade of 75.5, ranking him 50th among all qualifying safeties in 2016. He also received a coverage grade of 79.6, which ranked 29th.

The Raiders received a playoff berth after finishing second in the American Football Conference (AFC) West with a 12–4 record. On January 7, 2017, Joseph started in his first career playoff game and recorded four solo tackles as the Raiders lost 14–27 to the Texans in the AFC Wildcard game.

==== 2017 ====
He started the Raiders' season-opener at the Titans and recorded a season-high nine combined tackles and a pass deflection during their 26–16 victory. The following week, Joseph recorded five combined tackles, his first career sack, and forced a fumble by New York Jets quarterback Josh McCown, that he would recover to set up the Raiders' offense on an eventual touchdown scoring drive. They went on to defeat the Jets 45–20. On September 24, 2017, he collected a season-high eight solo tackles and assisted on a tackle in a 10–27 loss to the Washington Redskins. On October 19, 2017, Joseph recorded four combined tackles and a pass deflection, but exited the Raiders' 31–30 victory at the Kansas City Chiefs in the fourth quarter after sustaining an injury. He was sidelined for the Raiders' Week 8 loss to the Bills due to a groin injury. In Week 14, Joseph made three solo tackles, deflected a pass, and intercepted a pass by Alex Smith during a 26–15 loss at the Chiefs. On December 31, 2017, the Oakland Raiders fired head coach Jack Del Rio and finished third in the AFC West with a 6–10 record. He finished the 2017 season with 79 combined tackles (58 solo), four pass deflections, an interception, and a sack in 15 games and 15 starts. Pro Football Focus gave Joseph an overall grade of 80.8, ranking him 35th among all qualified safeties in 2017.

==== 2018 ====
In Week 11 against the Arizona Cardinals, Joseph made his first interception of the season off quarterback Josh Rosen in a 23-21 Raiders win. He finished the season playing in 13 games with eight starts, recording 48 combined tackles, two sacks, two passes defensed, and one interception. In the first eight weeks of the season, Joseph played only eleven snaps. During the trade deadline, it was speculated that the Raiders would be moving on from Joseph. Starting from week 11, Joseph's play improved and he finished the season as the Raiders' highest graded defender according to Pro Football Focus. He received an overall grade of 74.5 from Pro Football Focus in 2018, which ranked as the 23rd highest grade among all safeties.

==== 2019 ====
On May 2, 2019, the Raiders declined the fifth-year option on Joseph's contract, making him a free agent in 2020. He was named a starting safety to start the 2019 season. In week 10 against the Los Angeles Chargers on Thursday Night Football, Joseph recorded an interception off Philip Rivers late in the fourth quarter which sealed a 26–24 win. During the interception, Joseph injured his foot. He started the first nine games before suffering a foot injury in Week 10. He was placed on injured reserve on November 9, 2019. He finished the season with three passes defensed, an interception, and 49 tackles, which was second on the team at the time.

=== Cleveland Browns ===
On April 13, 2020, Joseph signed a one-year contract with the Cleveland Browns. He was placed on the active/physically unable to perform list at the start of training camp on August 3, and activated from the list five days later. In Week 3 against the Washington Football Team, Joseph recorded his first interception as a Brown during the 30–24 win. He was placed on the reserve/COVID-19 list by the team on December 29, and activated on January 2, 2021.

In the wild-card round of the playoffs against the Steelers, Joseph recovered an errant snap by Pittsburgh Steelers' center Maurkice Pouncey in the endzone for a Browns' touchdown during the 48–37 win. In the divisional round of the playoffs against the Kansas City Chiefs, Joseph intercepted a pass thrown by Chad Henne in the endzone for a touchback during the 22–17 loss.

Joseph became an unrestricted free agent following the 2020 season.

=== Las Vegas Raiders ===
Joseph signed with the Las Vegas Raiders on April 12, 2021. He was released by the Raiders on August 31.

=== Pittsburgh Steelers ===
Joseph was signed to the Pittsburgh Steelers' practice squad on September 1, 2021. On October 4, Joseph was promoted to the active roster. His contract expired when the team's season ended on January 16, 2022.

Joseph re-signed with the Steelers on March 31, 2022. On August 16, Joseph was placed on injured reserve with an ankle injury.

== NFL career statistics ==
Year	Team	Games		Tackles				Interceptions						Fumbles	
Year	Team	GP	GS	Cmb	Solo	Ast	Sck	PD	Int	Yds	Avg	Lng	TD	FF	FR
2016	OAK	12	9	60	44	16	0.0	6	1	21	21.0	21	0	0	1
2017	OAK	15	15	79	58	21	1.0	4	1	-1	-1.0	-1	0	1	1
2018	OAK	13	8	48	34	14	2.0	2	1	5	5.0	5	0	0	0
2019	OAK	9	9	49	38	11	0.0	3	1	0	0.0	0	0	0	1
2020	CLE	14	8	67	46	21	0.0	4	1	49	49.0	49	0	0	2
2021	PIT	2	0	2	1	1	0.0	1	0	0	0	0	0	0	0
Total		65	49	305	221	84	3.0	20	5	74	14.8	49	0	1	5

== Personal life ==
Joseph is of Haitian descent.
