= Jordan Elliott =

American football player (born 1997)

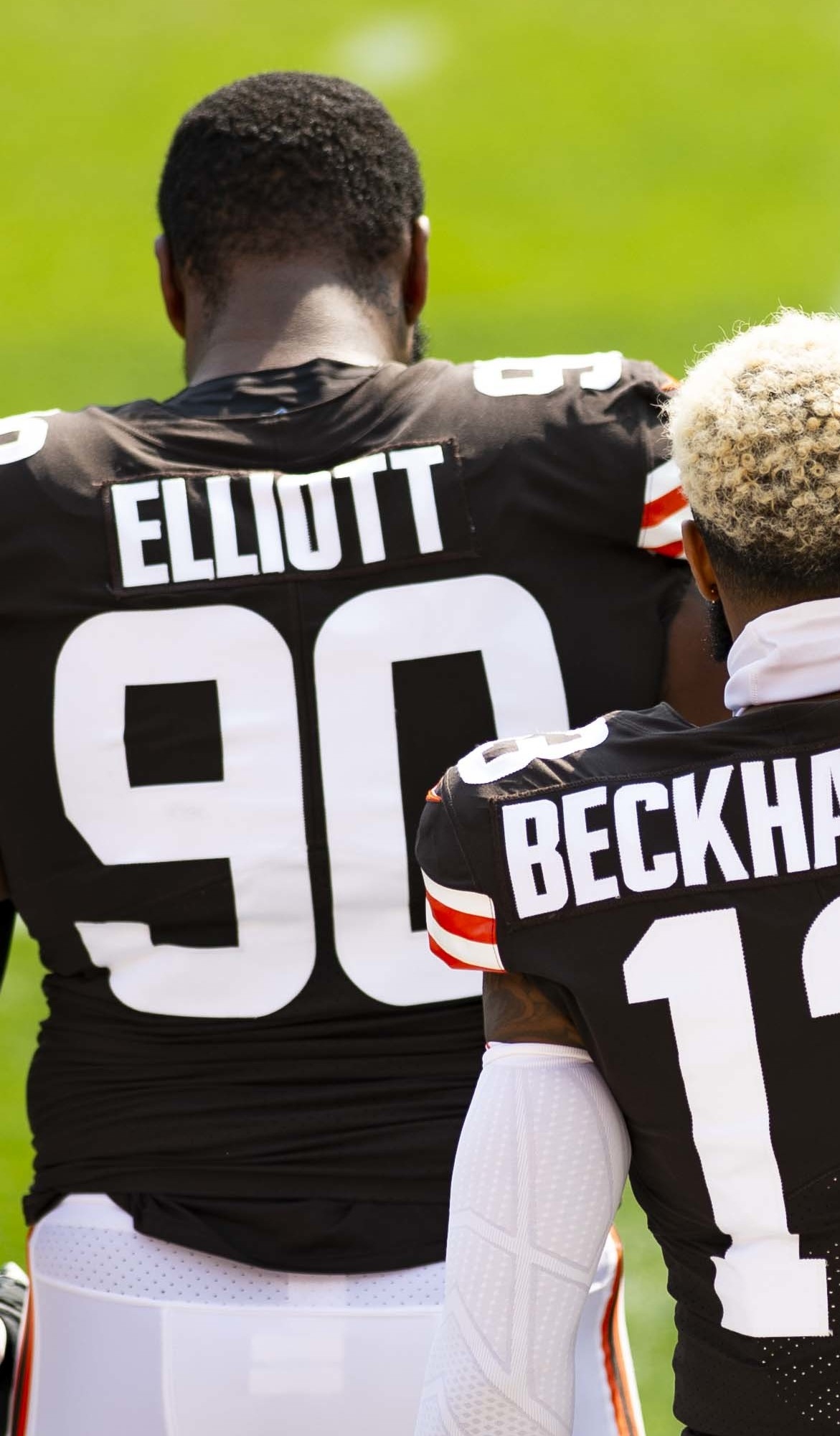
- Elliott with the Cleveland Browns in 2020

Profile
- Position: Defensive tackle

Personal information
- Born: November 23, 1997 (age 28); Missouri City, Texas, U.S.
- Listed height: 6 ft 4 in (1.93 m)
- Listed weight: 303 lb (137 kg)

Career information
- High school: Westside (Houston, Texas)
- College: Texas (2016); Missouri (2017–2019)
- NFL draft: 2020: 3rd round, 88th overall pick

Career history
- Cleveland Browns (2020–2023); San Francisco 49ers (2024–2025); Tennessee Titans (2026)

Awards and highlights
- First-team All-SEC (2019)

Career NFL statistics as of Week 6, 2026
- Total tackles: 159
- Sacks: 5
- Pass deflections: 5
- Stats at Pro Football Reference

Jordan Elliott (born November 23, 1997) is an American professional football defensive tackle. He played college football for the Texas Longhorns and Missouri Tigers and was selected by the Cleveland Browns in the third round of the 2020 NFL draft. He has also played for the San Francisco 49ers and Tennessee Titans.

== Early life ==
Elliott attended Westside High School in Houston, Texas. He played in the 2016 U.S. Army All-American Bowl. He committed to the University of Texas at Austin to play college football.

== College career ==
Elliott attended Texas for one season. He played in six games and recorded eight tackles. Prior to the 2017 season, he transferred to the University of Missouri. After sitting out 2017 due to transfer rules, Elliott played the next two years, recording 68 tackles and 5.5 sacks. After the 2019 season, he entered the 2020 NFL draft.

== Professional career ==
Pre-draft measurables
Height	Weight	Arm length	Hand span	Wingspan	40-yard dash	10-yard split	20-yard split	20-yard shuttle	Vertical jump	Bench press
6 ft 3 7/8 in (1.93 m)	302 lb (137 kg)	32 3/8 in (0.82 m)	10 1/4 in (0.26 m)	6 ft 7 in (2.01 m)	5.02 s	1.71 s	2.90 s	4.73 s	27.5 in (0.70 m)	24 reps
All values from NFL Combine

=== Cleveland Browns ===
Elliott was selected by the Cleveland Browns in the third round with the 88th overall pick of the 2020 NFL draft. He signed his rookie contract with the Browns on July 2, 2020. After two years in a rotational role, he was a full-time starter in 2022 and 2023.

=== San Francisco 49ers ===
On March 14, 2024, Elliott signed a two-year contract with the San Francisco 49ers. In 2024 he saw his role in the team increase due to injuries to Kevin Givens and Javon Hargrave. Elliott played 15 games and started 13, recording 19 tackles, two tackles for losses, and two quarterback hits. He missed one game in October with a knee injury and another in November with a concussion.

=== Tennessee Titans ===
On March 12, 2026, Elliott signed a two-year, $8 million contract with the Tennessee Titans. On October 20, the Titans announced that Elliott had been released from the team. The move came after Elliott got into a practice altercation with JC Latham at the team facility, and responded by trying to retrieve a gun from his car. It is a violation of NFL policies for a player to bring a gun to any league-affiliated facility.

== NFL career statistics ==
Legend
**Bold**	Career high

=== Regular season ===
Year	Team	Games		Tackles					Interceptions						Fumbles			
Year	Team	GP	GS	Cmb	Solo	Ast	Sck	TFL	Int	Yds	Avg	Lng	TD	PD	FF	FR	Yds	TD
2020	CLE	16	1	15	6	9	0.0	0	0	0	0.0	0	0	0	0	0	0	0
2021	CLE	16	3	26	10	16	0.5	0	0	0	0.0	0	0	1	0	0	0	0
2022	CLE	**17**	**17**	**36**	**19**	17	2.0	**5**	0	0	0.0	0	0	**2**	0	0	0	0
2023	CLE	**17**	14	21	14	7	**2.5**	3	0	0	0.0	0	0	1	0	0	0	0
2024	SF	15	13	19	12	7	0.0	2	0	0	0.0	0	0	0	0	0	0	0
2025	SF	16	16	31	8	**23**	0.0	1	0	0	0.0	0	0	1	0	0	0	0
Career		97	64	148	69	79	5.0	11	0	0	0.0	0	0	5	0	0	0	0

=== Postseason ===
Year	Team	Games		Tackles					Interceptions						Fumbles			
Year	Team	GP	GS	Cmb	Solo	Ast	Sck	TFL	Int	Yds	Avg	Lng	TD	PD	FF	FR	Yds	TD
2020	CLE	**2**	0	**2**	**1**	**1**	0.0	0	0	0	0.0	0	0	0	0	0	0	0
2023	CLE	1	0	1	**1**	0	0.0	0	0	0	0.0	0	0	**1**	0	0	0	0
2025	SF	**2**	**2**	1	0	**1**	0.0	0	0	0	0.0	0	0	0	0	0	0	0
Career		5	2	4	2	2	0.0	0	0	0	0.0	0	0	1	0	0	0	0
