= Rashard Higgins =

American football player (born 1994)

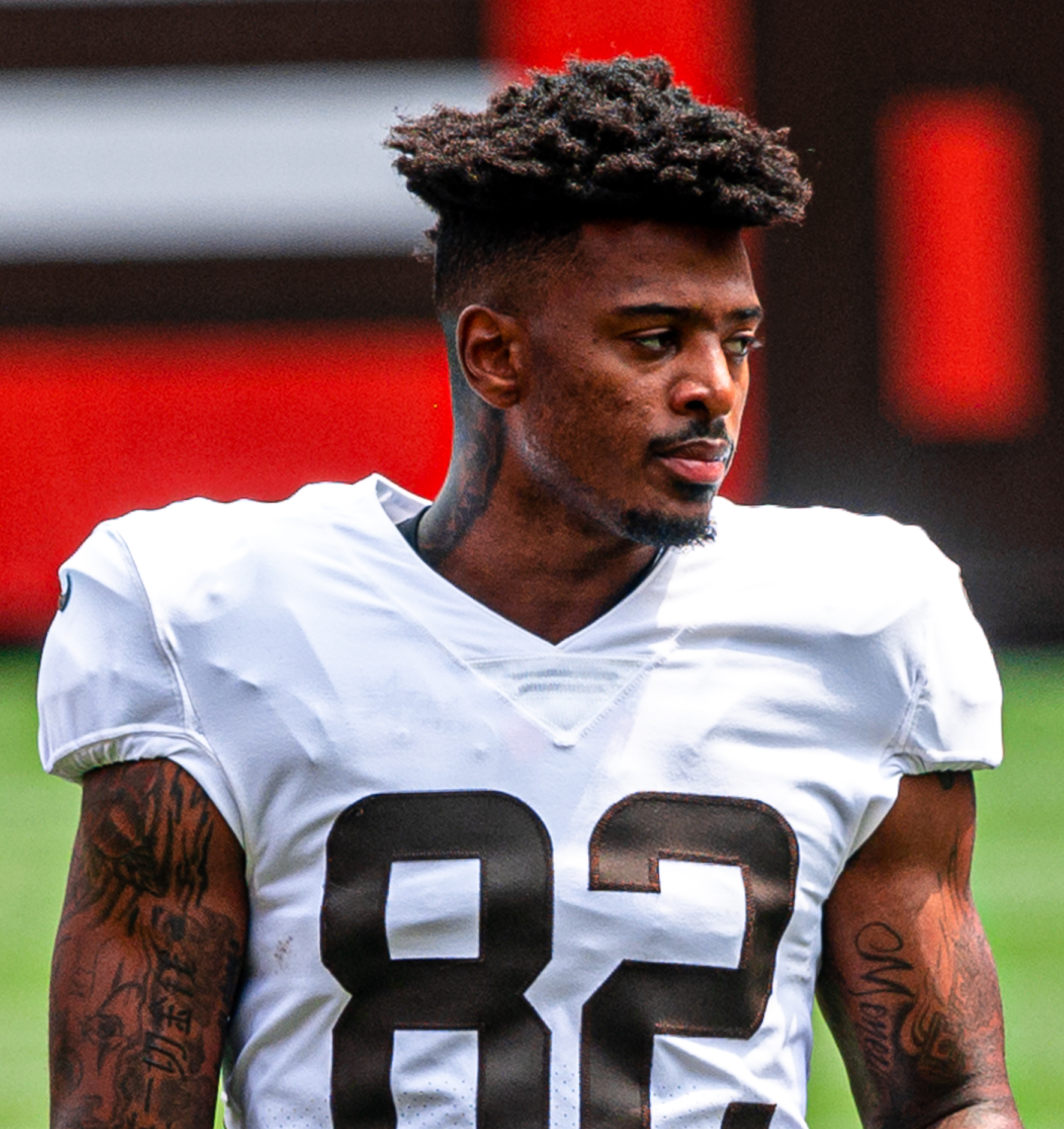
- Higgins with the Cleveland Browns in 2021

No. 17, 81, 82
- Position: Wide receiver

Personal information
- Born: October 7, 1994 (age 32); Dallas, Texas, U.S.
- Listed height: 6 ft 1 in (1.85 m)
- Listed weight: 198 lb (90 kg)

Career information
- High school: Mesquite (Mesquite, Texas)
- College: Colorado State (2013–2015)
- NFL draft: 2016: 5th round, 172nd overall pick

Career history
- Cleveland Browns (2016–2021); Carolina Panthers (2022)

Awards and highlights
- Consensus All-American (2014); NCAA receiving yards leader (2014); NCAA receiving touchdowns leader (2014); 2× First-team All-MW (2014, 2015)

Career NFL statistics
- Receptions: 137
- Receiving yards: 1,890
- Receiving touchdowns: 12
- Stats at Pro Football Reference

Rashard Malick Higgins (born October 7, 1994), nicknamed "Hollywood", is an American former professional football player who was a wide receiver in the National Football League (NFL). He played college football for the Colorado State Rams, earning first-team All-American honors in 2014. He played in the National Football League (NFL) for the Cleveland Browns and Carolina Panthers.

== Early life ==
Higgins attended Mesquite High School in Mesquite, Texas, where he was a three-sport athlete in football, basketball and track. He played as a wide receiver for the Mesquite football team. As a senior, he had 69 receptions for 1,136 yards 10 touchdowns. Higgins was a two-star recruit by Rivals.com. He was a starter on the Mesquite basketball team, where he averaged 17 points per game.

He also excelled in track & field at Mesquite. At the 2013 District Meet, he took fourth in the 200-meter dash with a time of 22.76 seconds, while also placing seventh in the long jump with a leap of 6.68 meters (21 ft, 8 in). He posted a personal-best time of 53.48 seconds in the 400-meter dash at the 2012 Rockin R Relays, where he finished fifth.

== College career ==
As a true freshman at Colorado State University in 2013, Higgins started all 14 games. He finished the season with a school freshman record 68 receptions, which went for 837 yards and six touchdowns. As a sophomore in 2014, Higgins led the nation with 1,750 receiving yards and 17 touchdowns and was a finalist for the Biletnikoff Award.

== Professional career ==
Pre-draft measurables
Height	Weight	Arm length	Hand span	40-yard dash	Vertical jump	Broad jump	Bench press
6 ft 1 3/8 in (1.86 m)	196 lb (89 kg)	32 1/4 in (0.82 m)	9 3/4 in (0.25 m)	4.64 s	32 in (0.81 m)	9 ft 8 in (2.95 m)	13 reps
All values from NFL Combine

=== Cleveland Browns ===
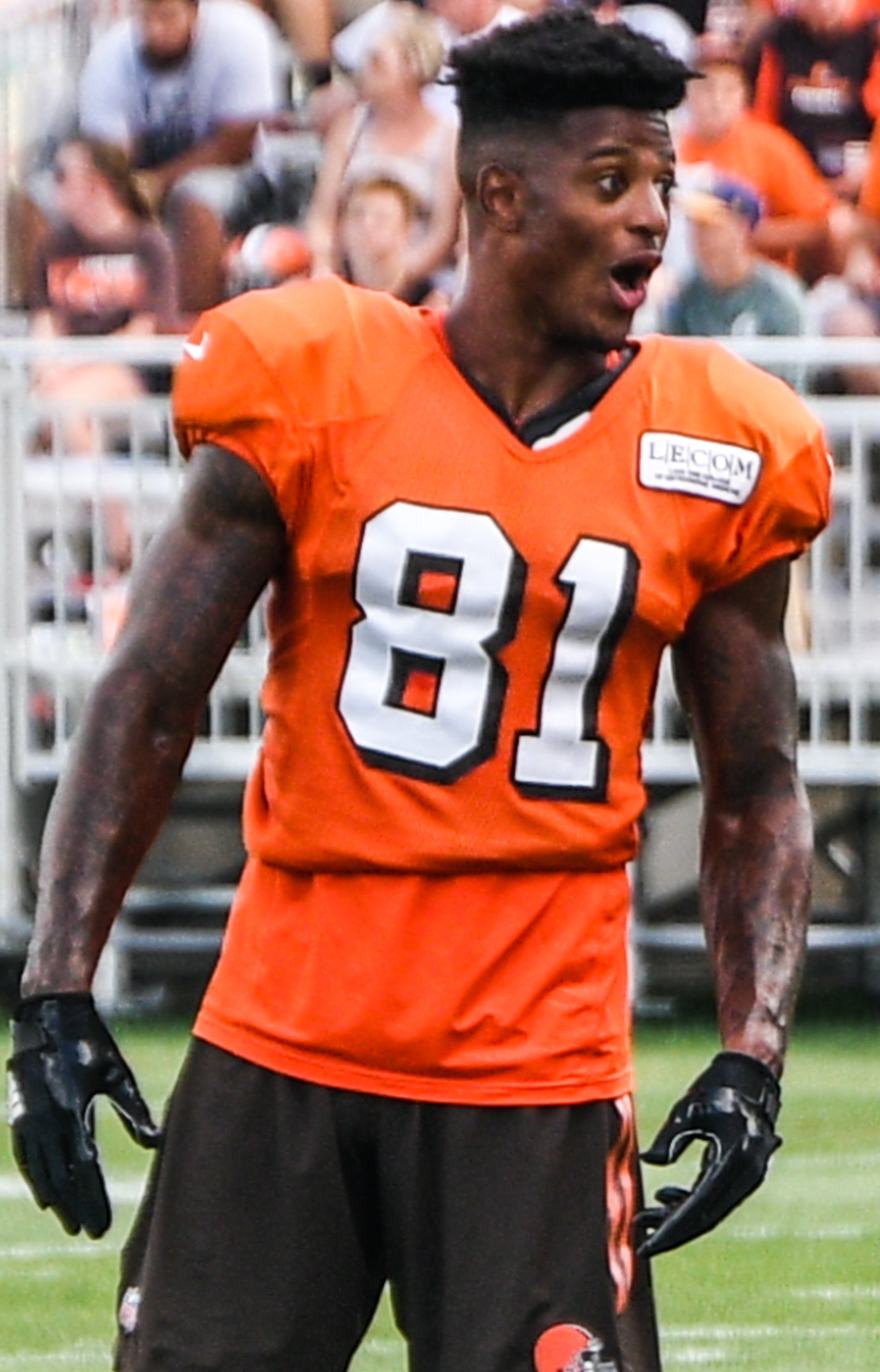
Higgins with the Cleveland Browns in 2017

The Cleveland Browns drafted Higgins in the fifth round with the 172nd overall pick in the 2016 NFL draft. On May 13, he signed a four-year contract worth about $2.52 million, which included a signing bonus worth about $184,000. He had six receptions for 77 yards in his rookie season.

On September 3, 2017, Higgins was waived by the Browns and was signed to the practice squad the next day. He was promoted to the active roster on September 16, 2017. On September 17, in the Week 2 game against the Baltimore Ravens, he had a career-best seven receptions for 95 yards in the 24–10 loss. In the final game of the 2017 season, Higgins caught his first two career touchdown passes – both from DeShone Kizer. Overall, in the 2017 season, he finished with 27 receptions for 312 receiving yards and two touchdowns. In 2018, Higgins further improved himself snatching 39 receptions for 572 yards and four touchdowns.

On March 4, 2019, the Browns tendered Higgins, who was set to become a restricted free agent. He caught his first touchdown of the season against the Buffalo Bills in Week 10, a seven-yard pass from Baker Mayfield that would prove to be the game-winner.

The Browns re-signed Higgins on May 8, 2020. In Week 7 of the 2020 season, he had his first 100-yard game with six receptions for 110 receiving yards in a 37–34 victory over the Cincinnati Bengals. He was placed on the reserve/COVID-19 list by the Browns on December 26, 2020, and activated on December 31.

Higgins became an unrestricted free agent following the 2020 season. On March 19, 2021, Higgins re-signed with the Browns on a one-year deal.

=== Carolina Panthers ===
On March 16, 2022, Higgins signed a one-year contract with the Carolina Panthers. He played in three games for Carolina, but did not draw a target or record any offensive statistics.

On April 15, 2024, Higgins announced his retirement from the NFL. Higgins announced that he would sign a one–day contract to retire a Cleveland Brown.

== Career statistics ==
Legend
**Bold**	Career high

=== NFL ===
Regular season statistics
Season	Team	Games		Receiving					Rushing					Fumbles	
Season	Team	G	GS	Rec	Yds	Avg	Lng	TD	Att	Yds	Avg	Lng	TD	Fum	Lost
2016	CLE	16	0	6	77	12.8	19	0	0	0	0.0	0	0	0	0
2017	CLE	15	4	27	312	11.6	**56**	2	**1**	**4**	**4.0**	**4**	0	1	**1**
2018	CLE	13	1	**39**	572	14.7	40	**4**	0	0	0.0	0	0	0	0
2019	CLE	10	1	4	55	13.8	35	1	0	0	0.0	0	0	0	0
2020	CLE	13	6	37	**599**	**16.2**	43	**4**	0	0	0.0	0	0	**2**	0
2021	CLE	15	4	24	275	11.5	21	1	0	0	0.0	0	0	0	0
2022	CAR	3	0	0	0	0.0	0	0	0	0	0.0	0	0	0	0
Total		85	16	137	1,890	13.8	56	12	1	4	4.0	4	0	3	1

Postseason statistics
Season	Team	Games		Receiving					Rushing					Fumbles	
Season	Team	G	GS	Rec	Yds	Avg	Lng	TD	Att	Yds	Avg	Lng	TD	Fum	Lost
2020	CLE	2	2	7	116	16.6	25	0	0	0	0.0	0	0	1	1
Total		2	2	7	116	16.6	25	0	0	0	0.0	0	0	0	0

=== College ===
Legend
Led the NCAA

Season	GP	Receiving					
Season	GP	Rec	Yards	Yds/Rec	Long	TD	Yds/G
2013	14	68	837	12.3	56	6	59.8
2014	12	**96**	**1,750**	**18.2**	**73**	**17**	**145.8**
2015	12	75	1,062	14.2	46	6	88.5
Total	38	239	3,649	15.27	73	29	96

== Awards and records ==
- 2015 MW Preseason Offensive Player of the Year
- Finalist, 2014 Biletnikoff Award
- 2014 consensus All-American
- Led nation in receiving yards (1,750) and receiving touchdowns (17) in 2014
- Ranked first in nation in yards-per-catch (18.2) among players with 65+ receptions
- Has 12 career games with 100 or more yards
- In just two seasons, has caught 164 passes for 2,587 yards and 23 touchdowns
- Named 2014 Male College Athlete of the Year by Colorado State Hall of Fame

== Post-retirement ==
In September 2025, Higgins stated that he had become a firefighter for the Dallas Fire-Rescue Department.

== See also ==
- List of NCAA major college football yearly receiving leaders
