= Drew Petzing =

American football player and coach (born 1987)

Detroit Lions
- Title: Offensive coordinator

Personal information
- Born: March 12, 1987 (age 39); Rochester, New York, U.S.

Career information
- Position: Safety
- High school: Wellesley (MA)
- College: Middlebury

Career history
- Harvard (2009) Volunteer student assistant; Boston College (2010–2011) Graduate assistant; Yale (2012) Outside linebackers coach; Cleveland Browns (2013) Football operations intern; Minnesota Vikings (2014–2019); Offensive assistant (2014–2015); Assistant wide receivers coach (2016–2017); Assistant quarterbacks coach (2018); Wide receivers coach (2019); Cleveland Browns (2020–2022); Tight ends coach (2020–2021); Quarterbacks coach (2022); Arizona Cardinals (2023–2025) Offensive coordinator; Detroit Lions (2026–present) Offensive coordinator
- Coaching profile at Pro Football Reference

Drew Petzing (born March 12, 1987) is an American professional football coach who is the offensive coordinator for the Detroit Lions of the National Football League (NFL). Petzing played college football at Middlebury from 2005 to 2006. He also previously served as an assistant coach for the Cleveland Browns, Minnesota Vikings, Yale University, Boston College, and Harvard University.

== Early years ==
Petzing attended Middlebury College where he played safety for the Panthers in 2005 and 2006 before injuries cut short his playing career. He spent the next two years as a volunteer student assistant before graduating in 2009 with a degree in economics. He minored in math and philosophy.

== Coaching career ==
=== Cleveland Browns ===
In 2013, Petzing was hired by the Cleveland Browns as a football operations intern.

=== Minnesota Vikings ===
In 2014, Petzing was hired by the Minnesota Vikings as an offensive assistant under head coach Mike Zimmer. In 2016, he was promoted to assistant wide receivers coach. In 2018, Petzing was promoted to assistant quarterbacks coach. In 2019, he was promoted to wide receivers coach.

=== Cleveland Browns (second stint) ===
On January 24, 2020, Petzing returned to the Cleveland Browns and was hired as their tight ends coach under head coach Kevin Stefanski. Petzing missed the team's week 12 game against the Jacksonville Jaguars in 2020 due to the birth of his child. He missed the team's wild card playoff game against the Pittsburgh Steelers on January 10, 2021, due to COVID-19 protocols.

=== Arizona Cardinals ===
On February 19, 2023, Petzing was hired as the offensive coordinator for the Arizona Cardinals under head coach Jonathan Gannon.

=== Detroit Lions ===
On January 26, 2026, Petzing was hired as the offensive coordinator for the Detroit Lions under head coach Dan Campbell.

== Personal life ==
Petzing graduated Middlebury College with a degree in economics in 2009. He is married to his wife, Louisa, and they have two children together: a daughter, Emilia, and a son, Owen.
