= Elijah Benton =

American football player (born 1996)

Profile
- Position: Safety

Personal information
- Born: September 5, 1996 (age 30); Forest, Virginia
- Listed height: 6 ft 1 in (1.85 m)
- Listed weight: 205 lb (93 kg)

Career information
- High school: Liberty Christian Academy (Lynchburg, Virginia)
- College: Liberty
- NFL draft: 2020: undrafted

Career history
- Cleveland Browns (2020); New England Patriots (2021)*; Seattle Seahawks (2021)*; New York Jets (2021)*; Tennessee Titans (2022)*
- * Offseason or practice squad member only
- Stats at Pro Football Reference

Elijah Benton (born September 5, 1996) is an American football safety. He played college football at Liberty.

== College career ==
Benton played college football at Liberty University.

== Professional career ==
=== Cleveland Browns ===
Benton signed with the Cleveland Browns as an undrafted free agent on May 5, 2020. He was waived by the Browns on September 5, 2020, and signed to their practice squad the next day. Benton was elevated to the active roster on October 17 for the team's week 6 game against the Pittsburgh Steelers, and reverted to the practice squad after the game. He was placed on the practice squad/COVID-19 list by the team on December 22, 2020, and restored to the practice squad on January 6, 2021.

Benton was signed to a reserve/futures contract by the Browns on January 18, 2021. Benton was waived by the Browns on August 31, 2021.

=== New England Patriots ===
On October 6, 2021, Benton was signed to the New England Patriots practice squad. He was released on October 26, 2021.

=== Seattle Seahawks ===
On December 1, 2021, Benton was signed to the Seattle Seahawks practice squad. He was released on December 7.

=== New York Jets ===
On December 8, 2021, Benton was signed to the New York Jets practice squad. He was released on December 30.

=== Tennessee Titans ===
On August 9, 2022, Benton signed with the Tennessee Titans, but was waived a week later.
