= Armani Taylor-Prioleau =

American football player (born 1997)

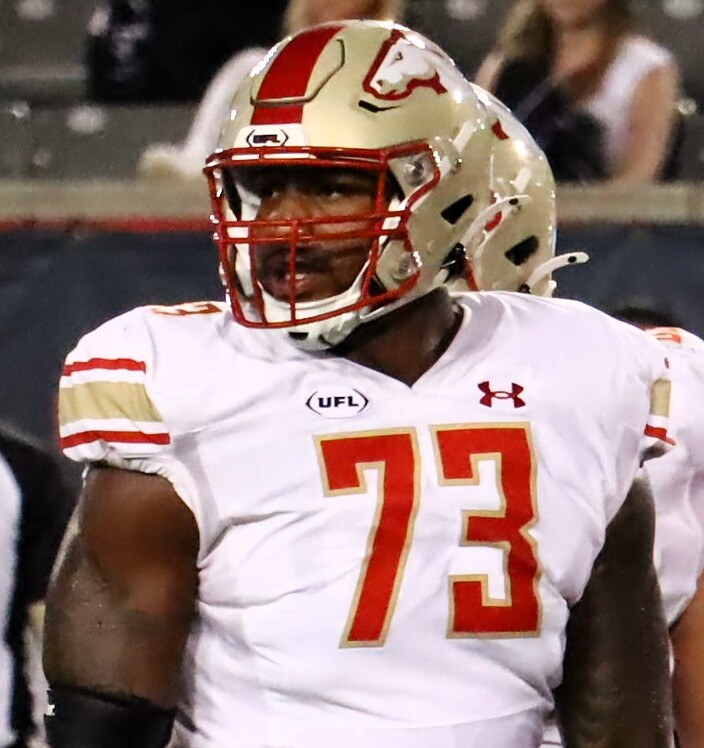
- Taylor-Prioleau with the Birmingham Stallions in 2025

Profile
- Position: Offensive tackle

Personal information
- Born: April 29, 1997 (age 29); Moncks Corner, South Carolina, U.S.
- Listed height: 6 ft 8 in (2.03 m)
- Listed weight: 318 lb (144 kg)

Career information
- High school: Berkeley (Moncks Corner)
- College: Appalachian State (2015); South Carolina State (2018–2019)
- NFL draft: 2020: undrafted

Career history
- Cleveland Browns (2020); Chicago Bears (2021); Cleveland Browns (2021–2022); Dallas Cowboys (2022–2023); Birmingham Stallions (2024); Washington Commanders (2024)*; Birmingham Stallions (2025–2026)
- * Offseason or practice squad member only

Awards and highlights
- UFL champion (2024); First-team All-MEAC (2019); Third-team All-MEAC (2018)

Career NFL statistics
- Games played: 4
- Stats at Pro Football Reference

Armani Alexander Taylor-Prioleau (born April 29, 1997), formerly known as Alex Taylor, is an American professional football offensive tackle. He played college football for the Appalachian State Mountaineers and South Carolina State Bulldogs. Taylor has been a member of the NFL's Cleveland Browns, Chicago Bears, Dallas Cowboys, and Washington Commanders; he won the 2024 UFL Championship with the Birmingham Stallions.

== Early life ==
Taylor grew up in Moncks Corner, South Carolina, and attended Berkeley Senior High School. He originally played only basketball and did not play football until his junior year.

== College career ==
Taylor spent his true freshman season at Appalachian State, redshirting the season. He opted to leave the school and transfer to South Carolina State University in order to play basketball. After spending two seasons as a reserve on the Bulldogs' basketball team, Taylor returned to football. He became a starter at tackle and was named third-team All-Mid-Eastern Athletic Conference (MEAC) as a redshirt junior. He was named first-team All-MEAC as a redshirt senior.

== Professional career ==
Pre-draft measurables
| Height | Weight | Arm length | Hand span | Wingspan | 40-yard dash | 10-yard split | 20-yard split | 20-yard shuttle | Three-cone drill | Vertical jump | Broad jump | Bench press |
|---|---|---|---|---|---|---|---|---|---|---|---|---|
| 6 ft 8 3/8 in (2.04 m) | 308 lb (140 kg) | 36 1/8 in (0.92 m) | 11 1/4 in (0.29 m) | 7 ft 4 in (2.24 m) | 5.09 s | 1.79 s | 2.94 s | 4.79 s | 7.77 s | 25.0 in (0.64 m) | 9 ft 8 in (2.95 m) | 21 reps |
All values from NFL Combine

=== Cleveland Browns ===
After going undrafted in the 2020 NFL draft, Taylor signed with the Cleveland Browns as an undrafted free agent on May 5, 2020. Taylor was waived with an injury designation on September 5, 2020, and subsequently reverted to the team's injured reserve list the next day. Taylor was waived from the Browns' injured reserve list with an injury settlement on September 16, 2020. He was re-signed to their practice squad on October 26, 2020. He was elevated to the active roster on January 2, 2021, for the team's week 17 game against the Pittsburgh Steelers, and reverted to the practice squad after the game. He was elevated again on January 9 and January 16 for the team's wild card and divisional playoff games against the Pittsburgh Steelers and Kansas City Chiefs, and reverted to the practice squad after each game.

Taylor signed a reserve/futures contract with the Browns on January 18, 2021. Taylor was waived by the Browns with an injury designation on August 23, 2021. After reverting to the injured reserve list, Taylor was waived off the injured reserve list on August 31, 2021.

=== Chicago Bears ===
On September 15, 2021, Taylor was signed to the Chicago Bears practice squad. He was released on October 7.

=== Cleveland Browns (second stint) ===
Taylor was signed to the Cleveland Browns' practice squad on October 12, 2021. Taylor was signed to the Browns' active roster on October 16, 2021. Taylor was waived by the Browns on October 29, 2021, and re-signed to the Browns' practice squad on October 30, 2021. He was promoted to the active roster on December 19. He was waived by the Browns on January 4, 2022, and re-signed to the Browns' practice squad on January 6, 2022. The Browns signed Taylor to a reserve/futures contract on January 10, 2022. Taylor was waived by the Browns on August 30, 2022. The Browns signed Taylor to their practice squad on August 31, 2022. He was released off the practice squad on September 20, 2022.

=== Dallas Cowboys ===
On November 9, 2022, Taylor was signed to the Dallas Cowboys practice squad. He signed a reserve/future contract on January 25, 2023.

On August 29, 2023, Taylor was waived by the Cowboys and re-signed to the practice squad. He was released on October 23.

=== Birmingham Stallions ===
On December 26, 2023, Taylor was signed by the Birmingham Stallions of the United States Football League (USFL). His contract was terminated on August 6, 2024.

=== Washington Commanders ===
On August 7, 2024, Taylor was signed by the Washington Commanders. He was waived/injured on August 27, 2024, reverting to injured reserve after going unclaimed. Taylor was released with an injury settlement on September 6, 2024.

=== Birmingham Stallions ===
On November 18, 2024, Taylor re-signed with the Stallions.

== Personal life ==
Taylor's father played college football at Presbyterian. He is the nephew of former NFL defensive back Pierson Prioleau and another uncle. Joe Hamilton, played football professionally and was a consensus All-American and Davey O'Brien Award recipient as a quarterback at Georgia Tech.
