= Jeff Howard =

American football player and coach (born 1983)

Seattle Seahawks
- Title: Safeties coach

Personal information
- Born: January 13, 1983 (age 43)

Career information
- Position: Linebacker
- College: Eastern New Mexico

Career history
- Odessa Permian High School (2007–2010) Assistant DBs/LBs – Defensive coordinator; Texas Tech (2011–2012) Offensive line assistant / Defensive quality control / DBs; Minnesota Vikings (2013–2019) Defensive assistant; Cleveland Browns (2020–2022) Defensive backs coach/Pass game coordinator; Los Angeles Chargers (2023) Linebackers coach; Seattle Seahawks (2024–present) Safeties coach

Awards and highlights
- Super Bowl champion (LX)

Jeff Howard (born January 13, 1983) is an American professional football coach who is the safeties coach for the Seattle Seahawks of the National Football League (NFL).

== Playing career ==
Howard played linebacker for Eastern New Mexico from 2001 to 2004 and was a 4-time Academic All-Lone Star Conference member. Howard earned 1st Team All-Lone Star Conference honors as a linebacker (LB) in 2003–2004 while capping his career by being named a 2004 AFCA Division II All-American and graduating cum laude with a degree in biology and chemistry. Howard had his jersey retired by Eastern New Mexico in 2006 and entered ENMU Hall of Honor in 2011.

== Coaching career ==
=== Early coaching career ===
Howard transitioned from his on-field playing days to coaching at Odessa Permian High School in Odessa, Texas. Howard was on staff from 2007 to 2010, during which he assisted the defensive backs and LBs before becoming the defensive coordinator in 2009–2010. Howard was on the Texas Tech staff from 2011 to 2012, he started in the summer of 2011 as an offensive assistant working with the offensive line position then moving to the defensive side of the ball to serve in the defensive quality control role for the 2011 season and coaching the safety position in 2012.

=== Minnesota Vikings ===
Howard joined the Minnesota Vikings for the 2013 NFL season as assistant to the head coach, Leslie Frazier. In 2014 he was promoted to defensive assistant and continued at the defensive assistant-linebackser in 2015 and assistant defensive backs in for the 2019 season.

=== Cleveland Browns ===
On January 29, 2020, the Cleveland Browns announced that Howard would be joining their team under Head Coach Kevin Stefanski as the team's defensive backs coach and pass game coordinator. Howard missed the team's wild card playoff game against the Pittsburgh Steelers on January 10, 2021, due to COVID-19 protocols.

=== Los Angeles Chargers ===
On February 11, 2023, the Los Angeles Chargers hired Howard as their linebackers coach.

=== Seattle Seahawks ===
In February 2024, he was hired as the safeties coach for the Seahawks. He was part of the coaching staff that won Super Bowl LX over the New England Patriots 29–13.
