= 2020 Houston Texans season =

19th season in franchise history; final one under Bill O'Brien

- Owner: Janice and D. Cal McNair
- General manager: Bill O'Brien (fired Oct. 5); Jack Easterby (interim)
- Head coach: Bill O'Brien (fired Oct. 5, 0–4 record); Romeo Crennel (interim, 4–8 record)
- Offensive coordinator: Tim Kelly
- Defensive coordinator: Anthony Weaver
- Home stadium: NRG Stadium

Results
- Record: 4–12
- Division place: 3rd AFC South
- Playoffs: Did not qualify
- Pro Bowlers: QB Deshaun Watson; OT Laremy Tunsil

Uniform
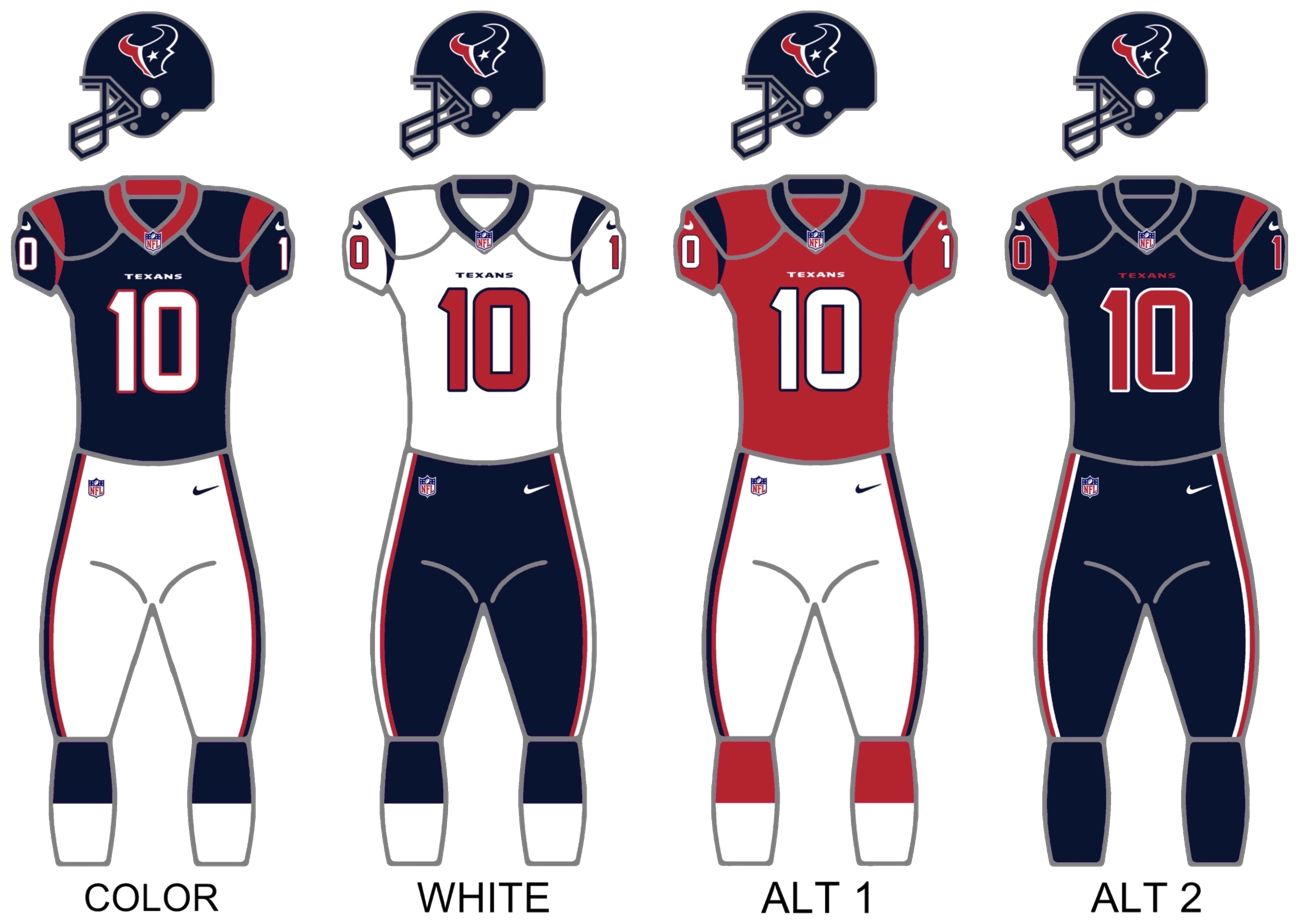

The 2020 season was the Houston Texans' 19th season in the National Football League (NFL) and their seventh and final season under head coach Bill O'Brien. Following their week 10 loss to the Cleveland Browns, they failed to match/improve their 10–6 record from last year and failed to win 10 or more games for the first time since the 2017 season. They were eliminated from playoff contention after a Week 14 loss to the Chicago Bears and suffered their first losing season since 2017. This was also the first season since 2012 that DeAndre Hopkins was not on the roster, as he was traded to the Arizona Cardinals in the offseason. This was the Texans' final season with Deshaun Watson as the starting quarterback, as he would sit out the next season amidst sexual misconduct allegations as well as demanding to be traded. Watson's final game as a Texan was on January 2, 2021, a 41–38 loss to the Tennessee Titans, and would be traded to the Cleveland Browns a year later, on March 18, 2022.

Following their first 0–4 start since 2008 and the trade of DeAndre Hopkins to the Arizona Cardinals, the Texans fired O'Brien on October 5, 2020. Romeo Crennel was later named as interim head coach and broke the record for oldest NFL head coach in history at 73 years and 112 days old. (Note: The previous record was held by Chicago Bears head coach and NFL co-founder George Halas at 72 years and 318 days old. The last game Halas coached was on December 17, 1967.) The season was stained with drama primarily consisting of trade rumors about Deshaun Watson and J. J. Watt and locker room issues. The Texans would lose many close games this year, with 8 of their 12 losses being decided by one score, mimicking their run in 2013 season where they finished with an abysmal 2–14 record after a playoff berth, in which 9 of their 14 losses fell within one score.

== Draft ==
2020 Houston Texans draft
Round	Pick	Player	Position	College	Notes
2	40	Ross Blacklock	DT	TCU	from Arizona
3	90	Jonathan Greenard	OLB	Florida	
4	126	Charlie Heck	OT	North Carolina	from LA Rams
4	141	John Reid	CB	Penn State	from Miami
5	171	Isaiah Coulter	WR	Rhode Island	
Made roster † Pro Football Hall of Fame * Made at least one Pro Bowl during career

Draft trades

- The Texans traded their 2020 first-round selection, as well as their first-round and second-round selections in the 2021 NFL draft, offensive tackle Julién Davenport, and cornerback Johnson Bademosi to the Miami Dolphins in exchange for offensive tackle Laremy Tunsil, wide receiver Kenny Stills, a 2020 fourth-round selection, and a 2021 sixth-round selection.
- The Texans traded defensive end Jadeveon Clowney to the Seattle Seahawks in exchange for linebacker Jacob Martin, linebacker Barkevious Mingo, and a third-round selection.
- The Texans traded the third-round selection gained from Seattle in the Jadeveon Clowney trade to the Las Vegas Raiders (then Oakland Raiders) in exchange for cornerback Gareon Conley.
- The Texans traded a conditional fourth-round selection (that became a third round selection after meeting aforementioned condition) to the Cleveland Browns in exchange for running back Duke Johnson.
- The Texans traded a sixth-round selection to the New England Patriots in exchange for cornerback Keion Crossen.
- The Texans traded wide receiver DeAndre Hopkins as well as a fourth-round selection to the Arizona Cardinals in exchange for a second-round selection, running back David Johnson, and a fourth-round selection in the 2021 NFL draft.
- The Texans traded a second-round selection (No. 57) to the Los Angeles Rams in exchange for wide receiver Brandin Cooks and a 2022 fourth-round selection.
- The Texans traded a fourth-round selection (136th) and two seventh-round selections (248th and 250th) to the Los Angeles Rams in exchange for a fourth-round selection (126th).
- The Texans traded a seventh-round selection (240th) to the New Orleans Saints in exchange for a 2021 sixth-round selection.

== Staff ==
2020 Houston Texans staff
Front office: Owner – Janice McNair; CEO – Cal McNair; President – Jamey Rootes; General manager – Bill O'Brien / Jack Easterby (interim); Executive vice president of football operations – Jack Easterby; Director of football operations – Clay Hampton; Director of college scouting – James Lipfert; Director of pro personnel – Rob Kisiel; Assistant director of pro personnel – C.J. Leak; Head coaches: Head coach – Bill O'Brien; Interim head coach/associate head coach – Romeo Crennel; Offensive coaches: Offensive coordinator/quarterbacks – Tim Kelly; Assistant quarterbacks – T. J. Yates; Running backs – Danny Barrett; Wide receivers – John Perry; Tight ends – Will Lawing; Offensive line – Mike Devlin; Offensive assistant – John Aylward; Offensive assistant – Denarius McGhee; Offensive consultant – Carl Smith	Defensive coaches: Defensive coordinator/defensive line – Anthony Weaver; Outside linebackers – Chris Rumph; Inside linebackers – Bobby King; Secondary – D'Anton Lynn; Defensive assistant – Deon Broomfield; Defensive assistant – Akeem Dent; Coordinator of football research/defensive assistant – Matt O'Donnell; Special teams coaches: Special teams coordinator – Tracy Smith; Strength and conditioning: Head strength and conditioning – Mike Eubanks; Assistant strength and conditioning coach – Brian Cushing; Assistant strength and conditioning coach – Joe Distor; Assistant strength and conditioning coach – Pat Moorer

== Final roster ==
2020 Houston Texans roster
Quarterbacks (QB): 2 A. J. McCarron; 3 Josh McCown; 4 Deshaun Watson; Running backs (RB): 22 Dontrell Hilliard; 38 Buddy Howell; 31 David Johnson; 25 Duke Johnson; 40 Scottie Phillips; Wide receivers (WR): 13 Brandin Cooks; 82 Isaiah Coulter; 16 Keke Coutee; 17 Chad Hansen; 11 Steven Mitchell; 19 Damion Ratley; Tight ends (TE): 88 Jordan Akins; 85 Pharaoh Brown; 87 Darren Fells; 81 Kahale Warring	Offensive linemen (OL): 73 Zach Fulton G; 67 Charlie Heck T; 63 Roderick Johnson T; 64 Senio Kelemete G; 66 Nick Martin C; 74 Max Scharping G; 78 Laremy Tunsil T; Defensive linemen (DL): 98 Auzoyah Alufohai DT; 90 Ross Blacklock DT; 97 Andrew Brown DE; 94 Charles Omenihu DE; 91 Carlos Watkins DE/DT; 99 J. J. Watt DE	Linebackers (LB): 50 Tyrell Adams ILB; 41 Zach Cunningham ILB; 56 Kyle Emanuel OLB; 52 Jonathan Greenard OLB; 48 Nate Hall ILB; 58 Peter Kalambayi ILB; 54 Jacob Martin OLB; 57 Brennan Scarlett OLB; Defensive backs (DB): 30 Cornell Armstrong CB; 35 Keion Crossen CB; 39 Mark Fields CB; 29 Phillip Gaines CB; 26 Vernon Hargreaves CB; 32 Lonnie Johnson Jr. FS; 33 A. J. Moore SS; 36 Jonathan Owens FS; 34 John Reid CB; 24 Geno Stone FS; Special teams (ST): 9 Bryan Anger P; 7 Kaʻimi Fairbairn K; 46 Jon Weeks LS	Practice squad: 49 Davin Bellamy OLB (PS/I); 62 Beau Benzschawel G; 47 Curtis Bolton ILB; 72 Cohl Cabral C; 43 Anthony Chesley CB; 42 Emmanuel Ellerbee ILB; 69 Willie Henry DE; 45 Anthony Kukwa LS; 65 Greg Mancz C; 83 J'Mon Moore WR; 75 Elijah Nkansah T; 27 Manny Patterson CB; 14 Artavis Scott WR; 37 Brandon Williams CB; Reserve: 18 Randall Cobb WR (IR); 51 Dylan Cole ILB (IR); 22 Gareon Conley CB (IR); 92 Brandon Dunn DT (IR); 53 Duke Ejiofor OLB (IR); 77 Hjalte Froholdt G/C (COVID-19); 15 Will Fuller WR (Susp.); 44 Cullen Gillaspia FB (IR); 96 P. J. Hall DE (IR); 71 Tytus Howard T (IR); 55 Benardrick McKinney ILB (IR); 59 Whitney Mercilus OLB (COVID-19); 23 Eric Murray SS (COVID-19); 76 Brent Qvale G/T (IR); 20 Justin Reid FS (IR); 21 Bradley Roby CB (Susp.); 28 Michael Thomas SS (IR); 95 Eddie Vanderdoes DT (Opt-out); Rookies in italics 52 active, 18 reserve, 13 practice squad (1 exempt)

== Preseason ==
The Texans' preseason schedule was announced on May 7, but was later cancelled due to the COVID-19 pandemic.

Week	Date	Opponent	Venue	Result
1	August 14	at Minnesota Vikings	U.S. Bank Stadium	Cancelled due to the COVID-19 pandemic
2	August 22	Seattle Seahawks	NRG Stadium	Cancelled due to the COVID-19 pandemic
3	August 29	at New Orleans Saints	Mercedes-Benz Superdome	Cancelled due to the COVID-19 pandemic
4	September 3	Dallas Cowboys	NRG Stadium	Cancelled due to the COVID-19 pandemic

== Regular season ==
=== Schedule ===
The Texans' 2020 schedule was announced on May 7.

Week	Date	Opponent	Result	Record	Venue	Recap
1	September 10	at Kansas City Chiefs	**L** 20–34	0–1	Arrowhead Stadium	Recap
2	September 20	Baltimore Ravens	**L** 16–33	0–2	NRG Stadium	Recap
3	September 27	at Pittsburgh Steelers	**L** 21–28	0–3	Heinz Field	Recap
4	October 4	Minnesota Vikings	**L** 23–31	0–4	NRG Stadium	Recap
5	October 11	**Jacksonville Jaguars**	**W** 30–14	1–4	NRG Stadium	Recap
6	October 18	at **Tennessee Titans**	**L** 36–42 (OT)	1–5	Nissan Stadium	Recap
7	October 25	Green Bay Packers	**L** 20–35	1–6	NRG Stadium	Recap
8	Bye					
9	November 8	at **Jacksonville Jaguars**	**W** 27–25	2–6	TIAA Bank Field	Recap
10	November 15	at Cleveland Browns	**L** 7–10	2–7	FirstEnergy Stadium	Recap
11	November 22	New England Patriots	**W** 27–20	3–7	NRG Stadium	Recap
12	November 26	at Detroit Lions	**W** 41–25	4–7	Ford Field	Recap
13	December 6	**Indianapolis Colts**	**L** 20–26	4–8	NRG Stadium	Recap
14	December 13	at Chicago Bears	**L** 7–36	4–9	Soldier Field	Recap
15	December 20	at **Indianapolis Colts**	**L** 20–27	4–10	Lucas Oil Stadium	Recap
16	December 27	Cincinnati Bengals	**L** 31–37	4–11	NRG Stadium	Recap
17	January 3	**Tennessee Titans**	**L** 38–41	4–12	NRG Stadium	Recap

Note: Intra-division opponents are in bold text.

=== Game summaries ===
==== Week 1: at Kansas City Chiefs ====
NFL Kickoff Game

Week One: Houston Texans at Kansas City Chiefs – Game summary

Quarter	1	2	3	4	Total
Texans	7	0	0	13	**20**
**Chiefs**	0	17	7	10	**34**

at Arrowhead Stadium, Kansas City, Missouri

- Date: September 10
- Game time: 7:20 p.m. CDT
- Game weather: Cloudy, 56 °F (13 °C)
- Game attendance: 15,895
- Referee: Clete Blakeman
- TV announcers (NBC): Al Michaels, Cris Collinsworth, Michele Tafoya and Terry McAulay
- Recap, Game Book

Game information

**First quarter**

- HOU – David Johnson 19-yard run (Kaʻimi Fairbairn kick), 4:54. Texans 7–0. **Drive: 9 plays, 80 yards, 5:12.**

**Second quarter**

- KC – Travis Kelce 6-yard pass from Patrick Mahomes (Harrison Butker kick), 14:13. Tied 7–7. **Drive: 11 plays, 75 yards, 5:41.**
- KC – Sammy Watkins 2-yard pass from Patrick Mahomes (Harrison Butker kick), 2:26. Chiefs 14–7. **Drive: 16 plays, 91 yards, 9:04.**
- KC – Harrison Butker 29-yard field goal, 0:00. Chiefs 17–7. **Drive: 4 plays, 48 yards, 4:07.**

**Third quarter**

- KC – Clyde Edwards-Helaire 27-yard run (Harrison Butker kick), 10:53. Chiefs 24–7. **Drive: 7 plays, 75 yards, 4:07.**

**Fourth quarter**

- KC – Tyreek Hill 3-yard pass from Patrick Mahomes (Harrison Butker kick), 11:25. Chiefs 31–7. **6 plays, 17 yards, 2:50.**
- HOU – Jordan Akins 19-yard pass from Deshaun Watson (pass failed), 7:15. Chiefs 31–13. **Drive: 10 plays, 75 yards, 4:10.**
- HOU – Deshaun Watson 1-yard run (Kaʻimi Fairbairn kick), 2:38. Chiefs 31–20. **Drive: 7 plays, 65 yards, 2:51.**
- KC – Harrison Butker 19-yard field goal, 0:30. Chiefs 34–20. **Drive: 6 plays, 19 yards, 2:08.**

**Top passers**

- HOU – Deshaun Watson – 20/32, 253 yards, TD, INT
- KC – Patrick Mahomes – 24/32, 211 yards, 3 TD

**Top rushers**

- HOU – David Johnson – 11 rushes, 77 yards, TD
- KC – Clyde Edwards-Helaire – 25 rushes, 138 yards, TD

**Top receivers**

- HOU – Will Fuller – 8 receptions, 112 yards
- KC – Sammy Watkins – 7 receptions, 82 yards, TD

==== Week 2: vs. Baltimore Ravens ====
Week Two: Baltimore Ravens at Houston Texans – Game summary

Quarter	1	2	3	4	Total
**Ravens**	3	17	3	10	**33**
Texans	0	10	0	6	**16**

at NRG Stadium, Houston, Texas

- Date: September 20
- Game time: 3:25 p.m. CDT
- Game weather: None (retractable roof closed)
- Game attendance: 0
- Referee: Tony Corrente
- TV announcers (CBS): Kevin Harlan, Trent Green and Melanie Collins
- Recap, Game Book

Game information

**First quarter**

- BAL – Justin Tucker 32-yard field goal, 1:14. Ravens 3–0. **Drive: 12 plays, 73 yards, 6:57.**

**Second quarter**

- BAL – Patrick Ricard 1-yard pass from Lamar Jackson (Justin Tucker kick), 12:55. Ravens 10–0. **Drive: 4 plays, 34 yards, 2:05.**
- HOU – Darren Fells 10-yard pass from Deshaun Watson (Kaʻimi Fairbairn kick), 9:45. Ravens 10–7. **Drive: 7 plays, 75 yards, 3:10.**
- BAL – Justin Tucker 39-yard field goal, 5:31. Ravens 13–7. **Drive: 9 plays, 58 yards, 4:14.**
- BAL – L. J. Fort 22-yard fumble return (Justin Tucker kick), 5:16. Ravens 20–7.
- HOU – Kaʻimi Fairbairn 44-yard field goal, 0:00. Ravens 20–10. **Drive: 7 plays, 63 yards, 1:06.**

**Third quarter**

- BAL – Justin Tucker 47-yard field goal, 6:24. Ravens 23–10. **Drive: 14 plays, 60 yards, 8:36.**

**Fourth quarter**

- HOU – Kaʻimi Fairbairn 35-yard field goal, 14:47. Ravens 23–13. **Drive: 14 plays, 58 yards, 6:37.**
- BAL – Mark Ingram II 30-yard run (Justin Tucker kick), 11:58, Ravens 30–13. **Drive: 6 plays, 75 yards, 2:49.**
- HOU – Kaʻimi Fairbairn 45-yard field goal, 8:13. Ravens 30–16. **Drive: 10 plays, 49 yards, 3:45.**
- BAL – Justin Tucker 20-yard field goal, 3:44. Ravens 33–16. **Drive: 13 plays, 71 yards, 4:29.**

**Top passers**

- BAL – Lamar Jackson – 18/24, 204 yards, TD
- HOU – Deshaun Watson – 25/36, 275 yards, TD, INT

**Top rushers**

- BAL – Gus Edwards – 10 rushes, 73 yards
- HOU – David Johnson – 11 rushes, 34 yards

**Top receivers**

- BAL – Marquise Brown – 5 receptions, 42 yards
- HOU – Brandin Cooks – 5 receptions, 95 yards

==== Week 3: at Pittsburgh Steelers ====
Week Three: Houston Texans at Pittsburgh Steelers – Game summary

Quarter	1	2	3	4	Total
Texans	7	14	0	0	**21**
**Steelers**	3	14	3	8	**28**

at Heinz Field, Pittsburgh, Pennsylvania

- Date: September 27
- Game time: 1:00 p.m. EDT/12:00 p.m. CDT
- Game weather: Mostly cloudy, 79 °F (26 °C)
- Game attendance: 0
- Referee: Shawn Smith
- TV announcers (CBS): Ian Eagle, Charles Davis and Evan Washburn
- Recap, Game Book

Game information

**First quarter**

- PIT – Chris Boswell 33-yard field goal, 8:55. Steelers 3–0. **Drive: 11 plays, 63 yards, 5:11.**
- HOU – Randall Cobb 28-yard pass from Deshaun Watson (Kaʻimi Fairbairn kick), 6:01. Texans 7–3. **Drive: 7 plays, 74 yards, 2:54.**

**Second quarter**

- HOU – David Johnson 28-yard run (Kaʻimi Fairbairn kick), 11:32. Texans 14–3. **Drive: 9 plays, 54 yards, 3:58.**
- PIT – Eric Ebron 10-yard pass from Ben Roethlisberger (Chris Boswell kick), 5:05. Texans 14–10. **Drive: 12 plays, 75 yards, 6:27.**
- PIT – JuJu Smith-Schuster 26-yard pass from Ben Roethlisberger (Chris Boswell kick), 1:14. Steelers 17–14. **Drive: 7 plays, 63 yards, 1:24.**
- HOU – Will Fuller 14-yard pass from Deshaun Watson (Kaʻimi Fairbairn kick), 0:24. Texans 21–17. **Drive: 5 plays, 75 yards, 0:50.**

**Third quarter**

- PIT – Chris Boswell 26-yard field goal, 9:54. Texans 21–20. **Drive: 12 plays, 62 yards, 5:06.**

**Fourth quarter**

- PIT – James Conner 12-yard run (Ben Roethlisberger-JuJu Smith-Schuster pass), 6:24. Steelers 28–21. **Drive: 12 plays, 79 yards, 7:03.**

**Top passers**

- HOU – Deshaun Watson – 19/27, 264 yards, 2 TD, INT
- PIT – Ben Roethlisberger – 23/36, 237 yards, 2 TD

**Top passers**

- HOU – David Johnson – 13 rushes, 23 yards, TD
- PIT – James Conner – 18 rushes, 109 yards, TD

**Top receivers**

- HOU – Randall Cobb – 4 receptions, 95 yards, TD
- PIT – Eric Ebron – 5 receptions, 52 yards, TD

==== Week 4: vs. Minnesota Vikings ====
Week Four: Minnesota Vikings at Houston Texans – Game summary

Quarter	1	2	3	4	Total
**Vikings**	7	10	7	7	**31**
Texans	0	6	10	7	**23**

at NRG Stadium, Houston, Texas

- Date: October 4
- Game time: 12:00 p.m. CDT
- Game weather: None (retractable roof closed)
- Game attendance: 12,102
- Referee: Brad Rogers
- TV announcers (Fox): Chris Myers, Greg Jennings, Brock Huard and Jen Hale
- Recap, Game Book

Game information

**First quarter**

- MIN – Dalvin Cook 5-yard run (Dan Bailey kick), 5:05. Vikings 7–0. **Drive: 7 plays, 56 yards, 4:13.**

**Second quarter**

- MIN – Dan Bailey 31-yard field goal, 5:05. Vikings 10–0. **Drive: 7 plays, 22 yards, 3:26.**
- HOU – Kaʻimi Fairbairn 50-yard field goal, 8:46. Vikings 10–3. **Drive: 10 plays, 43 yards, 3:55.**
- MIN – Dalvin Cook 7-yard run (Dan Bailey kick), 1:53. Vikings 17–3. **Drive: 12 plays, 75 yards, 6:53.**
- HOU – Kaʻimi Fairbairn 28-yard field goal, 0:27. Vikings 17–6. **Drive: 8 plays, 58 yards, 1:26.**

**Third quarter**

- HOU – Will Fuller 24-yard pass from Deshaun Watson (Kaʻimi Fairbairn kick), 9:47. Vikings 17–13. **Drive: 7 plays, 73 yards, 3:02.**
- HOU – Kaʻimi Fairbairn 25-yard field goal, 5:30. Vikings 17–16. **Drive: 6 plays, 48 yards, 1:54.**
- MIN – Adam Thielen 9-yard pass from Kirk Cousins (Dan Bailey kick), 0:41. Vikings 24–16. **Drive: 8 plays, 75 yards, 4:49.**

**Fourth quarter**

- MIN – Alexander Mattison 4-yard run (Dan Bailey kick), 10:50. Vikings 31–16. **Drive: 6 plays, 73 yards, 3:20.**
- HOU – Kenny Stills 24-yard pass from Deshaun Watson (Kaʻimi Fairbairn kick), 5:52. Vikings 31–23. **Drive: 9 plays, 77 yards, 4:58.**

**Top passers**

- MIN – Kirk Cousins – 16/22, 260 yards, TD
- HOU – Deshaun Watson – 20/33, 300 yards, 2 TD

**Top rushers**

- MIN – Dalvin Cook – 27 rushes, 130 yards, 2 TD
- HOU – David Johnson – 16 rushes, 63 yards

**Top receivers**

- MIN – Adam Thielen – 8 receptions, 114 yards, TD
- HOU – Will Fuller – 6 receptions, 108 yards, TD

The day after the game, head coach and general manager Bill O'Brien was fired.

==== Week 5: vs. Jacksonville Jaguars ====
Week Five: Jacksonville Jaguars at Houston Texans – Game summary

Quarter	1	2	3	4	Total
Jaguars	0	7	0	7	**14**
**Texans**	0	10	3	17	**30**

at NRG Stadium, Houston, Texas

- Date: October 11
- Game time: 12:00 p.m. CDT
- Game weather: None (retractable roof closed)
- Game attendance: 12,413
- Referee: Bill Vinovich
- TV announcers (CBS): Andrew Catalon, James Lofton and Sherree Burruss
- Recap, Game Book

Game information

**First quarter**

- No scoring plays.

**Second quarter**

- HOU – Kaʻimi Fairbairn 36-yard field goal, 14:07. Texans 3–0. **Drive: 17 plays, 73 yards, 7:35.**
- JAX – Keelan Cole 13-yard pass from Gardner Minshew (Stephen Hauschka kick), 6:33. Jaguars 7–3. **Drive: 12 plays, 75 yards, 7:34.**
- HOU – Darren Fells 44-yard pass from Deshaun Watson (Kaʻimi Fairbairn kick), 4:32. Texans 10–7. **Drive: 4 plays, 75 yards, 2:01.**

**Third quarter**

- HOU – Kaʻimi Fairbairn 33-yard field goal, 11:35. Texans 13–7. **Drive: 9 plays, 60 yards, 3:25.**

**Fourth quarter**

- HOU – Will Fuller 19-yard pass from Deshaun Watson (Kaʻimi Fairbairn kick), 14:16. Texans 20–7. **Drive: 8 plays, 90 yards, 4:00.**
- JAX – Collin Johnson 4-yard pass from Gardner Minshew (Stephen Hauschka kick), 10:18. Texans 20–14. **Drive: 10 plays, 75 yards, 3:58.**
- HOU – Kaʻimi Fairbairn 46-yard field goal, 7:29. Texans 23–14. **Drive: 6 plays, 47 yards, 2:49.**
- HOU – Brandin Cooks 28-yard pass from Deshaun Watson (Kaʻimi Fairbairn kick), 4:39. Texans 30–14. **Drive: 4 plays, 34 yards, 1:35.**

**Top passers**

- JAX – Gardner Minshew – 31/49, 301 yards, 2 TD
- HOU – Deshaun Watson – 25/35, 359 yards, 3 TD, 2 INT

**Top rushers**

- JAX – James Robinson – 13 rushes, 48 yards
- HOU – David Johnson – 17 rushes, 96 yards

**Top receivers**

- JAX – Laviska Shenault – 7 receptions, 79 yards
- HOU – Brandin Cooks – 8 receptions, 161 yards, TD

==== Week 6: at Tennessee Titans ====
Week Six: Houston Texans at Tennessee Titans – Game summary

Quarter	1	2	3	4	OT	Total
Texans	0	10	13	13	0	**36**
**Titans**	14	7	0	15	6	**42**

at Nissan Stadium, Nashville, Tennessee

- Date: October 18
- Game time: 12:00 p.m. CDT
- Game weather: Cloudy, 61 °F (16 °C)
- Game attendance: 10,166
- Referee: Alex Kemp
- TV announcers (CBS): Greg Gumbel, Rich Gannon and Jay Feely
- Recap, Game Book

Game information

**First quarter**

- TEN – Anthony Firkser 7-yard pass from Ryan Tannehill (Stephen Gostkowski kick), 6:57. Titans 7–0. **Drive: 6 plays, 82 yards, 3:30.**
- TEN – A. J. Brown 6-yard pass from Ryan Tannehill (Stephen Gostkowski kick), 0:12. Titans 14–0. **Drive: 10 plays, 71 yards, 5:14.**

**Second quarter**

- HOU – Darren Fells 1-yard pass from Deshaun Watson (Kaʻimi Fairbairn kick), 8:56. Titans 14–7. **Drive: 13 plays, 82 yards, 6:16.**
- TEN – Adam Humphries 22-yard pass from Ryan Tannehill (Stephen Gostkowski kick), 3:34. Titans 21–7. **Drive: 11 plays, 85 yards, 5:22.**
- HOU – Kaʻimi Fairbairn 38-yard field goal, 0:00. Titans 21–10. **Drive: 11 plays, 55 yards, 3:14.**

**Third quarter**

- HOU – David Johnson 1-yard run (Kaʻimi Fairbairn kick), 6:15. Titans 21–17. **Drive: 5 plays, 79 yards, 2:32.**
- HOU – Randall Cobb 4-yard pass from Deshaun Watson (Kaʻimi Fairbairn kick no good, wl), 4:35. Texans 23–21. **Drive: 3 plays, 4 yards, 1:22.**

**Fourth quarter**

- TEN – Derrick Henry 94-yard run (R. Tannehill-N. Westbrook-Ikhine pass), 9:23. Titans 29–23. **Drive: 1 play, 94 yards, 0:14.**
- HOU – Will Fuller 53-yard pass from Deshaun Watson (Kaʻimi Fairbairn kick), 8:37. Texans 30–29. **Drive: 2 plays, 75 yards, 0:46.**
- HOU – Brandin Cooks 1-yard pass from Deshaun Watson (pass failed), 1:50. Texans 36–29. **Drive: 15 plays, 69 yards, 6:40.**
- TEN – A. J. Brown 7-yard pass from Ryan Tannehill (Stephen Gostkowski kick), 0:04. Tied 36–36. **Drive: 9 plays, 76 yards, 1:46.**

**Overtime**

- TEN – Derrick Henry 5-yard run, 6:30. Titans 42–36. **Drive: 6 plays, 82 yards, 3:30.**

**Top passers**

- HOU – Deshaun Watson – 28/37, 335 yards, 4 TD
- TEN – Ryan Tannehill – 30/41, 364 yards, 4 TD, INT

**Top rushers**

- HOU – David Johnson – 19 rushes, 57 yards, TD
- TEN – Derrick Henry – 22 rushes, 212 yards, 2 TD

**Top receivers**

- HOU – Will Fuller – 6 receptions, 123 yards, TD
- TEN – Anthony Firkser – 8 receptions, 113 yards, TD

==== Week 7: vs. Green Bay Packers ====
Week Seven: Green Bay Packers at Houston Texans – Game summary

Quarter	1	2	3	4	Total
**Packers**	7	14	7	7	**35**
Texans	0	0	7	13	**20**

at NRG Stadium, Houston, Texas

- Date: October 25
- Game time: 12:00 p.m. CDT
- Game weather: None (retractable roof closed)
- Game attendance: 12,618
- Referee: Clay Martin
- TV announcers (Fox): Kenny Albert, Jonathan Vilma and Shannon Spake
- Recap, Game Book

Game information

**First quarter**

- GB – Davante Adams 3-yard pass from Aaron Rodgers (Mason Crosby kick), 9:21. Packers 7–0. **Drive: 10 plays, 75 yards, 5:39.**

**Second quarter**

- GB – Jace Sternberger 3-yard pass from Aaron Rodgers (Mason Crosby kick), 13:33. Packers 14–0. **Drive: 9 plays, 88 yards, 4:37.**
- GB – Malik Taylor 1-yard pass from Aaron Rodgers (Mason Crosby kick), 0:14. Packers 21–0. **Drive: 9 plays, 69 yards, 2:24.**

**Third quarter**

- HOU – David Johnson 3-yard pass from Deshaun Watson (Kaʻimi Fairbairn kick), 8:55. Packers 21–7. **Drive: 11 plays, 75 yards, 6:05.**
- GB – Davante Adams 45-yard pass from Aaron Rodgers (Mason Crosby kick), 4:44. Packers 28–7. **Drive: 8 plays, 75 yards, 4:11.**

**Fourth quarter**

- HOU – Kaʻimi Fairbairn 38-yard field goal, 14:12. Packers 28–10. **Drive: 7 plays, 47 yards, 3:36.**
- HOU – Kaʻimi Fairbairn 29-yard field goal, 9:56. Packers 28–13. **Drive: 7 plays, 11 yards, 2:12.**
- GB – Jamaal Williams 1-yard run (Mason Crosby kick), 3:40. Packers 35–13. **Drive: 7 plays, 46 yards, 3:18.**
- HOU – Will Fuller 6-yard pass from Deshaun Watson (Kaʻimi Fairbairn kick), 1:33. Packers 35–20. **Drive: 9 plays, 75 yards, 2:07.**

**Top passers**

- GB – Aaron Rodgers – 23/34, 283 yards, 4 TD
- HOU – Deshaun Watson – 29/39, 309 yards, 2 TD

**Top rushers**

- GB – Jamaal Williams – 19 rushes, 66 yards, TD
- HOU – David Johnson – 14 rushes, 42 yards

**Top receivers**

- GB – Davante Adams – 13 receptions, 196 yards, 2 TD
- HOU – Randall Cobb – 8 receptions, 95 yards

==== Week 9: at Jacksonville Jaguars ====
Week Nine: Houston Texans at Jacksonville Jaguars – Game summary

Quarter	1	2	3	4	Total
**Texans**	10	10	7	0	**27**
Jaguars	7	9	3	6	**25**

at TIAA Bank Field, Jacksonville, Florida

- Date: November 8
- Game time: 1:00 p.m. EST/12:00 p.m. CST
- Game weather: Partly Cloudy, 79 °F (26 °C)
- Game attendance: 15,668
- Referee: Brad Allen
- TV announcers (CBS): Spero Dedes and Adam Archuleta
- Recap, Game Book

Game information

**First quarter**

- JAX – D. J. Chark 73-yard pass from Jake Luton (Josh Lambo kick), 14:19. Jaguars 7–0. **Drive: 3 plays, 75 yards, 0:52.**
- HOU – Brandin Cooks 57-yard pass from Deshaun Watson (Kaʻimi Fairbairn kick), 13:33. Tied 7–7. **Drive: 2 plays, 75 yards, 0:35.**
- HOU – Kaʻimi Fairbairn 54-yard field goal, 9:52. Texans 10–7. **Drive: 6 plays, 45 yards, 2:45.**

**Second quarter**

- HOU – Kaʻimi Fairbairn 30-yard field goal, 12:29. Texans 13–7. **Drive: 14 plays, 59 yards, 6:01.**
- JAX – James Robinson 1-yard run (kick failed), 5:44. Tied 13–13. **Drive: 12 plays, 75 yards, 6:45.**
- HOU – Duke Johnson 1-yard run (Kaʻimi Fairbairn kick), 0:30. Texans 20–13. **Drive: 6 plays, 98 yards, 1:44.**
- JAX – Josh Lambo 59-yard field goal, 0:02. Texans 20–16. **Drive: 3 plays, 18 yards, 0:27.**

**Third quarter**

- HOU – Will Fuller 77-yard pass from Deshaun Watson (Kaʻimi Fairbairn kick), 6:15. Texans 27–16. **Drive: 3 plays, 81 yards, 1:21.**
- JAX – Josh Lambo 30-yard field goal, 1:13. Texans 27–19. **Drive: 9 plays, 63 yards, 4:54.**

**Fourth quarter**

- JAX – Jake Luton 13-yard run (pass failed), 1:30. Texans 27–25. **Drive: 7 plays, 80 yards, 1:27.**

**Top passers**

- HOU – Deshaun Watson – 19/32, 281 yards, 2 TD
- JAX – Jake Luton – 26/38, 304 yards, TD, INT

**Top rushers**

- HOU – Deshaun Watson – 10 rushes, 50 yards
- JAX – James Robinson – 25 rushes, 99 yards, TD

**Top receivers**

- HOU – Will Fuller – 5 receptions, 100 yards, TD
- JAX – D. J. Chark – 7 receptions, 146 yards, TD

==== Week 10: at Cleveland Browns ====
Week Ten: Houston Texans at Cleveland Browns – Game summary

Quarter	1	2	3	4	Total
Texans	0	0	0	7	**7**
**Browns**	3	0	0	7	**10**

at FirstEnergy Stadium, Cleveland, Ohio

- Date: November 15
- Game time: 1:00 p.m. EST/12:00 p.m. CST
- Game weather: Rain, 59 °F (15 °C)
- Game attendance: 10,613
- Referee: Ronald Torbert
- TV announcers (Fox): Dick Stockton, Matt Millen and Sara Walsh
- Recap, Game Book

Game information

**First quarter**

- CLE – Cody Parkey 41-yard field goal, 8:27. Browns 3–0. **Drive: 12 plays, 52 yards, 6:33.**

**Second quarter**

- No scoring plays.

**Third quarter**

- No scoring plays.

**Fourth quarter**

- CLE – Nick Chubb 9-yard run, 13:32. Browns 10–0. **Drive: 9 plays, 64 yards, 5:01.**
- HOU – Pharaoh Brown 16-yard pass from Deshaun Watson (Kaʻimi Fairbairn kick), 4:59. Browns 10–7. **Drive: 7 plays, 90 yards, 2:52.**

**Top passers**

- HOU – Deshaun Watson – 20/30, 163 yards, TD
- CLE – Baker Mayfield – 12/20, 132 yards

**Top rushers**

- HOU – Duke Johnson – 14 rushes, 54 yards
- CLE – Nick Chubb – 19 rushes, 126 yards, TD

**Top receivers**

- HOU – Randall Cobb – 3 receptions, 41 yards
- CLE – Rashard Higgins – 3 receptions, 48 yards

The game was delayed moments before kickoff due to severe weather, with the weather delay lasting for 37 minutes. The heavy rains affected filed conditions while the gusty winds in the area made passing and kicking the ball difficult. Early in the 2nd quarter, facing a 4th and 2 from the Cleveland 2-yard line, Houston went for it, but Deshaun Watson was sacked by Myles Garrett for a 2-yard loss. Later in the quarter, the Browns would also turn the ball over on downs when a Baker Mayfield pass intended for Jarvis Landry fell incomplete in Houston territory. Texans kicker Kaʻimi Fairbairn attempted a 46-yard field goal late in the 3rd, but the gusty winds pushed the ball wide left; Cleveland would score the game's first touchdown on the following drive with a 9-yard run from Nick Chubb. The two teams would trade punts on their next respective drives before Houston would score its first points of the game on a 90-yard drive that ended with a 16-yard pass from Watson to tight end Pharaoh Brown with 4:59 left in the game. On the ensuing kickoff, Donovan Peoples-Jones muffed the punt on his own 2-yard line and recovered it for a 1-yard gain before being taken down by Buddy Howell. The Texans had a chance to get the ball back late in the game with the Browns facing a 3rd and 3 at their own 40-yard line with 1:07 left to play, but Chubb broke free for a 59-yard run before intentionally running out of bounds at the Houston 1-yard line.

==== Week 11: vs. New England Patriots ====
Week Eleven: New England Patriots at Houston Texans – Game summary

Quarter	1	2	3	4	Total
Patriots	7	3	7	3	**20**
**Texans**	7	14	3	3	**27**

at NRG Stadium, Houston, Texas

- Date: November 22
- Game time: 12:00 p.m. CST
- Game weather: Partly cloudy, 79 °F (26 °C) (retractable roof open)
- Game attendance: 12,503
- Referee: John Hussey
- TV announcers (CBS): Andrew Catalon, James Lofton and AJ Ross
- Recap, Game Book

Game information

**First quarter**

- NE – Damien Harris 9-yard run (Nick Folk kick), 6:52. Patriots 7–0. **Drive: 10 plays, 84 yards, 5:32.**
- HOU – Randall Cobb 3-yard pass from Deshaun Watson (Kaʻimi Fairbairn kick), 3:36. Tied 7–7. **Drive: 6 plays, 73 yards, 3:16.**

**Second quarter**

- NE – Nick Folk 45-yard field goal, 8:32. Patriots 10–7. **Drive: 10 plays, 45 yards, 5:05.**
- HOU – Deshaun Watson 4-yard run (Kaʻimi Fairbairn kick), 3:54. Texans 14–10. **Drive: 8 plays, 75 yards, 4:38.**
- HOU – Keke Coutee 6-yard pass from Deshaun Watson (Kaʻimi Fairbairn kick), 0:10. Texans 21–10. **Drive: 9 plays, 80 yards, 2:10.**

**Third quarter**

- NE – Damiere Byrd 42-yard pass from Cam Newton (Nick Folk kick), 8:14. Texans 21–17. **Drive: 7 plays, 82 yards, 2:43.**
- HOU – Kaʻimi Fairbairn 36-yard field goal, 2:04. Texans 24–17. **Drive: 11 plays, 57 yards, 6:10.**

**Fourth quarter**

- NE – Nick Folk 36-yard field goal, 7:39. Texans 24–20. **Drive: 16 plays, 65 yards, 9:25.**
- HOU – Kaʻimi Fairbairn 46-yard field goal, 4:11. Texans 27–20. **Drive: 8 plays, 47 yards, 3:28.**

**Top passers**

- NE – Cam Newton – 26/40, 365 yards, TD
- HOU – Deshaun Watson – 28/37, 344 yards, 2 TD

**Top rushers**

- NE – Damien Harris – 11 rushes, 43 yards, TD
- HOU – Deshaun Watson – 6 rushes, 36 yards, TD

**Top receivers**

- NE – Damiere Byrd – 6 receptions, 132 yards, TD
- HOU – Brandin Cooks – 4 receptions, 85 yards

Days prior to the game, New England head coach Bill Belichick stated that Romeo Crennel is the best coach he ever worked with. The two previously worked together with the New York Giants in the 80s, while Crennel served as Belichick's defensive coordinator on the Patriots from 2001 to 2004. This is the second time Crennel will face off against his former team as a head coach. At the time of kickoff, Belichick and Crennel will set a record for the oldest head coaching matchup in NFL history at 68 and 73 years old, respectively, for a combined age of 141 years. (Note: The previous record was set during week 2 of the 2020 season between Belichick (68) and Seattle Seahawks head coach Pete Carroll (69) at 137 combined years.)

==== Week 12: at Detroit Lions ====
Thanksgiving Day games

Week Twelve: Houston Texans at Detroit Lions – Game summary

Quarter	1	2	3	4	Total
**Texans**	13	10	3	15	**41**
Lions	7	7	3	8	**25**

at Ford Field, Detroit, Michigan

- Date: November 26
- Game time: 12:30 p.m. EST/11:30 a.m. CST
- Game weather: None (indoor stadium)
- Game attendance: 0
- Referee: Shawn Smith
- TV announcers (CBS): Jim Nantz, Tony Romo, Tracy Wolfson and Gene Steratore
- Recap, Game Book

Game information

**First quarter**

- DET – Adrian Peterson 1-yard run (Matt Prater kick), 6:54. Lions 7–0. **Drive: 7 plays, 85 yards, 4:16.**
- HOU – J. J. Watt 19-yard interception return (kick failed), 4:38. Lions 7–6. **Drive: 1 play, 0 yards, 0:07.**
- HOU – C. J. Prosise 2-yard pass from Deshaun Watson (Kaʻimi Fairbairn kick), 2:58. Texans 13–7. **Drive: 3 plays, 30 yards, 1:26.**

**Second quarter**

- DET – Adrian Peterson 1-yard run (Matt Prater kick), 12:56. Lions 14–13. **Drive: 4 plays, 26 yards, 1:54.**
- HOU – Duke Johnson 33-yard pass from Deshaun Watson (Kaʻimi Fairbairn kick), 10:18. Texans 20–14. **Drive: 5 plays, 60 yards, 2:38.**
- HOU – Kaʻimi Fairbairn 42-yard field goal, 1:44. Texans 23–14. **Drive: 9 plays, 57 yards, 4:31.**

**Third quarter**

- DET – Matt Prater 29-yard field goal, 7:24. Texans 23–17. **Drive: 14 plays, 68 yards, 7:36.**
- HOU – Kaʻimi Fairbairn 26-yard field goal, 3:10. Texans 26–17. **Drive: 9 plays, 67 yards, 4:14.**

**Fourth quarter**

- HOU – Will Fuller 40-yard pass from Deshaun Watson (Deshaun Watson–Keke Coutee pass), 12:09. Texans 34–17. **Drive: 6 plays, 85 yards, 2:51.**
- HOU – Will Fuller 34-yard pass from Deshaun Watson (Kaʻimi Fairbairn kick), 10:07. Texans 41–17. **Drive: 1 play, 34 yards, 0:10.**
- DET – Mohamed Sanu 14-yard pass from Matthew Stafford (Matthew Stafford–Mohamed Sanu pass), 6:32. Texans 41–25. **Drive: 12 plays, 75 yards, 3:35.**

**Top passers**

- HOU – Deshaun Watson – 17/25, 318 yards, 4 TD
- DET – Matthew Stafford – 28/42, 295 yards, TD, INT

**Top rushers**

- HOU – Duke Johnson – 9 rushes, 37 yards
- DET – Adrian Peterson – 15 rushes, 55 yards, 2 TD

**Top receivers**

- HOU – Will Fuller – 6 receptions, 171 yards, 2 TD
- DET – T. J. Hockenson – 5 receptions, 89 yards

The day after the game, it was announced that receiver Kenny Stills would be released. The move was a mutual decision between Stills and the team.

==== Week 13: vs. Indianapolis Colts ====
Week Thirteen: Indianapolis Colts at Houston Texans – Game summary

Quarter	1	2	3	4	Total
**Colts**	14	10	0	2	**26**
Texans	10	10	0	0	**20**

at NRG Stadium, Houston, Texas

- Date: December 6
- Game time: 12:00 p.m. CST
- Game weather: Sunny, 57 °F (14 °C) (retractable roof open)
- Game attendance: 12,316
- Referee: Scott Novak
- TV announcers (CBS): Greg Gumbel, Rich Gannon and Sherree Burruss
- Recap, Game Book

Game information

**First quarter**

- IND – T. Y. Hilton 21-yard pass from Philip Rivers (Rodrigo Blankenship kick), 9:52. Colts 7–0. **Drive: 6 plays, 67 yards, 3:28.**
- HOU – Deshaun Watson 11-yard run (Kaʻimi Fairbairn kick), 7:51. Tied 7–7. **Drive: 4 plays, 75 yards, 2:01.**
- HOU – Kaʻimi Fairbairn 52-yard field goal, 4:37. Texans 10–7. **Drive: 6 plays, 26 yards, 1:48.**
- IND – Nyheim Hines 5-yard run (Rodrigo Blankenship kick), 0:41. Colts 14–10. **Drive: 8 plays, 72 yards, 3:52.**

**Second quarter**

- IND – Jonathan Taylor 39-yard pass from Philip Rivers (Rodrigo Blankenship kick), 9:17. Colts 21–10. **Drive: 6 plays, 57 yards, 3:15.**
- HOU – David Johnson 6-yard run (Kaʻimi Fairbairn kick), 4:39. Colts 21–17. **Drive: 9 plays, 75 yards, 4:38.**
- IND – Rodrigo Blankenship 42-yard field goal, 1:15. Colts 24–17. **Drive: 10 plays, 55 yards, 3:27.**
- HOU – Kaʻimi Fairbairn 34-yard field goal, 0:08. Colts 24–20. **Drive: 8 plays, 58 yards, 1:07.**

**Third quarter**

- No scoring plays

**Fourth quarter**

- IND – Deshaun Watson sacked in end zone by Justin Houston, 6:08. Colts 26–20.

**Top passers**

- IND – Philip Rivers – 27/35, 285 yards, 2 TD
- HOU – Deshaun Watson – 26/38, 341 yards, INT

**Top rushers**

- IND – Jonathan Taylor – 13 rushes, 91 yards
- HOU – David Johnson – 10 rushes, 44 yards, TD

**Top receivers**

- IND – T. Y. Hilton – 9 receptions, 110 yards, TD
- HOU – Keke Coutee – 8 receptions, 141 yards

==== Week 14: at Chicago Bears ====
Week Fourteen: Houston Texans at Chicago Bears – Game summary

Quarter	1	2	3	4	Total
Texans	0	7	0	0	**7**
**Bears**	7	23	3	3	**36**

at Soldier Field, Chicago, Illinois

- Date: December 13
- Game time: 12:00 p.m. CST
- Game weather: Partly cloudy, 34 °F (1 °C)
- Game attendance: 0
- Referee: Land Clark
- TV announcers (CBS): Kevin Harlan, Trent Green and Melanie Collins
- Recap, Game Book

Game information

**First quarter**

- CHI – David Montgomery 80-yard run (Cairo Santos kick), 10:04. Bears 7–0. **Drive: 1 play, 80 yards, 0:12.**

**Second quarter**

- CHI – Jimmy Graham 14-yard pass from Mitchell Trubisky (Cairo Santos kick), 12:57. Bears 14–0. **Drive: 12 plays, 79 yards, 6:46.**
- HOU – Keke Coutee 5-yard pass from Deshaun Watson (Kaʻimi Fairbairn kick), 8:37. Bears 14–7. **Drive: 8 plays, 86 yards, 4:20.**
- CHI – Deshaun Watson sacked in end zone by Khalil Mack, 6:04. Bears 16–7.
- CHI – Darnell Mooney 12-yard pass from Mitchell Trubisky (Cairo Santos kick), 3:22. Bears 23–7. **Drive: 5 plays, 66 yards, 2:42.**
- CHI – Allen Robinson 3-yard pass from Mitchell Trubisky (Cairo Santos kick), 0:08. Bears 30–7. **Drive: 11 plays, 77 yards, 1:37.**

**Third quarter**

- CHI – Cairo Santos 39-yard field goal, 10:37. Bears 33–7. **Drive: 7 plays, 56 yards, 4:23.**

**Fourth quarter**

- CHI – Cairo Santos 32-yard field goal, 10:47. Bears 36–7. **Drive: 8 plays, 28 yards, 4:13.**

**Top passers**

- HOU – Deshaun Watson – 21/30, 219 yards, TD
- CHI – Mitchell Trubisky – 24/33, 267 yards, 3 TD

**Top rushers**

- HOU – Buddy Howell – 11 rushes, 42 yards
- CHI – David Montgomery – 11 rushes, 113 yards, TD

**Top receivers**

- HOU – Chad Hansen – 7 receptions, 56 yards
- CHI – Allen Robinson – 9 receptions, 123 yards, TD

==== Week 15: at Indianapolis Colts ====
Week 15: Houston Texans at Indianapolis Colts – Game summary

Quarter	1	2	3	4	Total
Texans	0	10	3	7	**20**
**Colts**	14	0	3	10	**27**

at Lucas Oil Stadium, Indianapolis, Indiana

- Date: December 20
- Game time: 1:00 p.m. EST/12:00 p.m. CST
- Game weather: None (retractable roof closed)
- Game attendance: 9,992
- Referee: Bill Vinovich
- TV announcers (CBS): Greg Gumbel, Rich Gannon and Jay Feely
- Recap, Game Book

Game information

**First quarter**

- IND – Jonathan Taylor 5-yard run (Rodrigo Blankenship kick), 5:49. Colts 7–0. **Drive: 10 plays, 81 yards, 5:39.**
- IND – Zach Pascal 11-yard pass from Philip Rivers (Rodrigo Blankenship kick), 0:52. Colts 14–0. **Drive: 4 plays, 42 yards, 2:22.**

**Second quarter**

- HOU – Chad Hansen 38-yard pass from Deshaun Watson (Kaʻimi Fairbairn kick), 3:46. Colts 14–7. **Drive: 7 plays, 79 yards, 4:09.**
- HOU – Kaʻimi Fairbairn 23-yard field goal, 0:00. Colts 14–10. **Drive: 12 plays, 76 yards, 1:43.**

**Third quarter**

- IND – Rodrigo Blankenship 35-yard field goal, 8:27. Colts 17–10. **Drive: 13 plays, 58 yards, 6:33.**
- HOU – Kaʻimi Fairbairn 31-yard field goal, 1:19. Colts 17–13. **Drive: 12 plays, 55 yards, 7:08.**

**Fourth quarter**

- IND – Rodrigo Blankenship 53-yard field goal, 13:31. Colts 20–13. **Drive: 6 plays, 40 yards, 2:48.**
- HOU – Keke Coutee 9-yard pass from Deshaun Watson (Kaʻimi Fairbairn kick), 7:25. Tied 20–20. **Drive: 10 plays, 80 yards, 6:06.**
- IND – Zach Pascal 5-yard pass from Philip Rivers (Rodrigo Blankenship kick), 1:47. Colts 27–20. **Drive: 12 plays, 75 yards, 5:38.**

**Top passers**

- HOU – Deshaun Watson – 33/41, 373 yards, 2 TD
- IND – Philip Rivers – 22/28, 228 yards, 2 TD

**Top rushers**

- HOU – David Johnson – 8 rushes, 27 yards
- IND – Jonathan Taylor – 16 rushes, 83 yards, TD

**Top receivers**

- HOU – David Johnson – 11 receptions, 106 yards
- IND – Zach Pascal – 5 receptions, 79 yards, 2 TD

==== Week 16: vs. Cincinnati Bengals ====
Week Sixteen: Cincinnati Bengals at Houston Texans – Game summary

Quarter	1	2	3	4	Total
**Bengals**	7	3	14	13	**37**
Texans	3	7	14	7	**31**

at NRG Stadium, Houston, Texas

- Date: December 27
- Game time: 12:00 p.m. CST
- Game weather: None (retractable roof closed)
- Game attendance: 12,344
- Referee: Brad Rogers
- TV announcers (Fox): Chris Myers, Greg Jennings and Jen Hale
- Recap, Game Book

Game information

**First quarter**

- CIN – Drew Sample 8-yard pass from Brandon Allen (Austin Seibert kick), 8:32. Bengals 7–0. **Drive: 8 plays, 71 yards, 4:56.**
- HOU – Kaʻimi Fairbairn 21-yard field goal, 1:12. Bengals 7–3. **Drive: 5 plays, 54 yards, 2:11.**

**Second quarter**

- CIN – Austin Seibert 35-yard field goal, 3:30. Bengals 10–3. **Drive: 9 plays, 74 yards, 4:09.**
- HOU – Brandin Cooks 25-yard pass from Deshaun Watson (Kaʻimi Fairbairn kick), 1:54. Tied 10–10. **Drive: 5 plays, 75 yards, 1:36.**

**Third quarter**

- CIN – Samaje Perine 46-yard run (Austin Seibert kick), 12:59. Bengals 17–10. **Drive: 4 plays, 75 yards, 2:01.**
- HOU – David Johnson 4-yard run (Kaʻimi Fairbairn kick), 9:05. Tied 17–17. **Drive: 7 plays, 75 yards, 3:54.**
- CIN – Tee Higgins 20-yard pass from Brandon Allen (Austin Seibert kick), 5:46. Bengals 24–17. **Drive: 5 plays, 75 yards, 3:19.**
- HOU – David Johnson 2-yard pass from Deshaun Watson (Kaʻimi Fairbairn kick), 0:55. Tied 24–24. **Drive: 8 plays, 75 yards, 4:51.**

**Fourth quarter**

- CIN – Austin Seibert 48-yard field goal, 10:35. Bengals 27–24. **Drive: 11 plays, 60 yards, 5:20.**
- HOU – Darren Fells 22-yard pass from Deshaun Watson (Kaʻimi Fairbairn kick), 6:15. Texans 31–27. **Drive: 7 plays, 78 yards, 4:20.**
- CIN – Samaje Perine 3-yard run (Austin Seibert kick), 1:57. Bengals 34–31. **Drive: 10 plays, 75 yards, 4:18.**
- CIN – Austin Seibert 36-yard field goal, 0:18. Bengals 37–31. **Drive: 5 plays, 20 yards, 1:10.**

**Top passers**

- CIN – Brandon Allen – 29/37, 371 yards, 2 TD
- HOU – Deshaun Watson – 24/33, 324 yards, 3 TD

**Top rushers**

- CIN – Samaje Perine – 13 rushes, 95 yards, 2 TD
- HOU – David Johnson – 12 rushes, 128 yards, TD

**Top receivers**

- CIN – Tee Higgins – 6 receptions, 99 yards, TD
- HOU – Brandin Cooks – 7 receptions, 141 yards, TD

==== Week 17: vs. Tennessee Titans ====
Week Seventeen: Tennessee Titans at Houston Texans – Game summary

Quarter	1	2	3	4	Total
**Titans**	3	14	14	10	**41**
Texans	3	6	19	10	**38**

at NRG Stadium, Houston, Texas

- Date: January 3, 2021
- Game time: 3:25 p.m. CST
- Game weather: Sunny, 66 °F (19 °C) (retractable roof open)
- Game attendance: 12,504
- Referee: Shawn Hochuli
- TV announcers (CBS): Greg Gumbel, Rich Gannon and Amanda Renner
- Recap, Game Book

Game information

**First quarter**

- TEN – Sam Sloman 47-yard field goal, 6:41. Titans 3–0. **Drive: 4 plays, 2 yards, 0:55.**
- HOU – Kaʻimi Fairbairn 24-yard field goal, 1:42. Tied 3–3. **Drive: 11 plays, 72 yards, 4:59.**

**Second quarter**

- TEN – Derrick Henry 52-yard run (Sam Sloman kick), 14:51. Titans 10–3. **Drive: 4 plays, 75 yards, 1:51.**
- HOU – Kaʻimi Fairbairn 43-yard field goal, 8:15. Titans 10–6. **Drive: 11 plays, 51 yards, 6:36.**
- TEN – A. J. Brown 4-yard pass from Ryan Tannehill (Sam Sloman kick), 4:29. Titans 17–6. **Drive: 7 plays, 75 yards, 3:46.**
- HOU – Kaʻimi Fairbairn 28-yard field goal, 0:10. Titans 17–9. **Drive: 12 plays, 50 yards, 4:19.**

**Third quarter**

- TEN – Derrick Henry 6-yard run (Sam Sloman kick), 9:53. Titans 24–9. **Drive: 10 plays, 75 yards, 5:07.**
- HOU – Brandin Cooks 38-yard pass from Deshaun Watson (kick failed), 8:08. Titans 24–15. **Drive: 4 plays, 75 yards, 1:45.**
- TEN – Ryan Tannehill 5-yard run (Sam Sloman kick), 4:29. Titans 31–15. **Drive: 8 plays, 77 yards, 3:39.**
- HOU – Brandin Cooks 20-yard pass from Deshaun Watson (pass failed), 2:59. Titans 31–21. **Drive: 3 plays, 65 yards, 1:30.**
- HOU – David Johnson 1-yard run (Kaʻimi Fairbairn kick), 1:20. Titans 31–28. **Drive: 3 plays, 28 yards, 1:32.**

**Fourth quarter**

- HOU – Pharaoh Brown 7-yard pass from Deshaun Watson (Kaʻimi Fairbairn kick), 10:14. Texans 35–31. **Drive: 6 plays, 52 yards, 2:59.**
- TEN – Ryan Tannehill 5-yard run (Sam Sloman kick), 1:42. Titans 38–35. **Drive: 19 plays, 75 yards, 8:32.**
- HOU – Kaʻimi Fairbairn 51-yard field goal, 0:18. Tied 38–38. **Drive: 8 plays, 58 yards, 1:24.**
- TEN – Sam Sloman 37-yard field goal, 0:00. Titans 41–38. **Drive: 3 plays, 56 yards, 0:18.**

**Top passers**

- TEN – Ryan Tannehill – 18/27, 216 yards, TD
- HOU – Deshaun Watson – 28/39, 365 yards, 3 TD

**Top rushers**

- TEN – Derrick Henry – 34 rushes, 250 yards, 2 TD
- HOU – David Johnson – 14 rushes, 84 yards, TD

**Top receivers**

- TEN – A. J. Brown – 10 receptions, 151 yards, TD
- HOU – Brandin Cooks – 11 receptions, 166 yards, 2 TD

This marked the first time the Texans were swept by the Titans since 2007. This was also Deshaun Watson's final game with Houston, as he sat out the entire 2021 season due to a trade demand and multiple allegations of sexual assault, which then led to him being traded to the Browns just before the 2022 season. Additionally, it would also be J. J. Watt's final game as a Texan as he would sign with the Cardinals in the offseason.

=== Standings ===
==== Division ====
AFC South
	W	L	T	PCT	DIV	CONF	PF	PA	STK
^{(4)} Tennessee Titans	11	5	0	.688	5–1	8–4	491	439	W1
^{(7)} Indianapolis Colts	11	5	0	.688	4–2	7–5	451	362	W1
Houston Texans	4	12	0	.250	2–4	3–9	384	464	L5
Jacksonville Jaguars	1	15	0	.063	1–5	1–11	306	492	L15

==== Conference ====
AFC
#	Team	Division	W	L	T	PCT	DIV	CONF	SOS	SOV	STK
**Division leaders**
1	Kansas City Chiefs	West	14	2	0	.875	4–2	10–2	.465	.464	L1
2	Buffalo Bills	East	13	3	0	.813	6–0	10–2	.512	.471	W6
3	Pittsburgh Steelers	North	12	4	0	.750	4–2	9–3	.475	.448	L1
4 (Note: Tennessee finished ahead of Indianapolis in the AFC South based on division record.)	Tennessee Titans	South	11	5	0	.688	5–1	8–4	.475	.398	W1
**Wild cards**
5 (Note: Baltimore claimed the No. 5 seed over Indianapolis based on head-to-head victory. Division tiebreaker used to eliminate Cleveland (see below).) (Note: Baltimore claimed the No. 5 seed over Cleveland based on head-to-head sweep.)	Baltimore Ravens	North	11	5	0	.688	4–2	7–5	.494	.401	W5
6 (Note: Cleveland claimed the No. 6 seed over Indianapolis based on head-to-head victory.)	Cleveland Browns	North	11	5	0	.688	3–3	7–5	.451	.406	W1
7	Indianapolis Colts	South	11	5	0	.688	4–2	7–5	.443	.384	W1
**Did not qualify for the postseason**
8	Miami Dolphins	East	10	6	0	.625	3–3	7–5	.467	.347	L1
9	Las Vegas Raiders	West	8	8	0	.500	4–2	6–6	.539	.477	W1
10 (Note: New England finished ahead of the LA Chargers based on head-to-head victory.)	New England Patriots	East	7	9	0	.438	3–3	6–6	.527	.429	W1
11	Los Angeles Chargers	West	7	9	0	.438	3–3	6–6	.482	.344	W4
12	Denver Broncos	West	5	11	0	.313	1–5	4–8	.566	.388	L3
13	Cincinnati Bengals	North	4	11	1	.281	1–5	4–8	.529	.438	L1
14	Houston Texans	South	4	12	0	.250	2–4	3–9	.541	.219	L5
15	New York Jets	East	2	14	0	.125	0–6	1–11	.594	.656	L1
16	Jacksonville Jaguars	South	1	15	0	.063	1–5	1–11	.549	.688	L15
**Tiebreakers** (Note: When breaking ties for three or more teams under the NFL's rules, they are first broken within divisions, then comparing only the highest ranked remaining team from each division.)

== Statistics ==
=== Team ===
Category	Total yards	Yards per game	NFL rank (out of 32)
Passing offense	4,538	283.6	4th
Rushing offense	1,466	91.6	31st
Total offense	6,004	375.3	13th
Passing defense	4,104	256.5	24th
Rushing defense	2,564	160.3	32nd
Total defense	6,668	416.8	30th

=== Individual ===
Category	Player	Total
Offense
Passing yards	Deshaun Watson	4,823
Passing touchdowns	Deshaun Watson	33
Rushing yards	David Johnson	691
Rushing touchdowns	David Johnson	6
Receiving yards	Brandin Cooks	1,150
Receiving touchdowns	Will Fuller	8
Defense
Tackles (Solo)	Zach Cunningham	106
Sacks	J. J. Watt	5
Interceptions	J. J. Watt; Bradley Roby; Vernon Hargreaves	1

== See also ==
- List of NFL teams affected by internal conflict
