= Cal McNair =

American businessman and sports team owner (born 1961)

- Born: Daniel Calhoun McNair; October 24, 1961 (age 64); Houston, Texas, U.S.
- Education: University of Texas at Austin; Rice University (MBA)
- Occupations: Owner, Chairman and CEO, Houston Texans
- Spouse: Hannah Hartland (m. 2009)
- Children: 7
- Parents: Bob McNair (father); Janice McNair (mother)

Daniel Calhoun McNair (born October 24, 1961) is an American businessman and sports executive. He is the principal owner, chairman, and chief executive officer of the Houston Texans of the National Football League (NFL).

== Early life and education ==
McNair was born in Houston, Texas, on October 24, 1961, to Bob McNair and Janice McNair. He attended Spring Forest Middle School in Houston, where he played running back on the football team along with future NFL player Craig James. He then went to Cypress-Fairbanks High School. McNair attended the University of Texas at Austin, where he was a walk-on member of the Longhorns football team, and subsequently graduated from Rice University in 1995 with a Master's in Business Administration.

== Business career ==
McNair became one of the first employees of his father's company, Cogen Technologies, in 1987. While working there, he worked in financial analysis and project management, supervising the construction of multiple power stations in the eastern United States. Currently, he is an executive for the Palmetto Trust Company and RCM Financial Services.

== Houston Texans ==
McNair has had a role with the Houston Texans franchise since its creation, and played a role in selecting many of its coaches and general managers. He was named vice chairman of the team in 2008, and chief operating officer in 2012. It was reported that in 2006 McNair was witnessed by quarterback Sage Rosenfels in his office sitting on the floor playing video games. In a September 2022 Reddit Ask Me Anything, McNair denied that he ever played video games in his office. McNair assumed more responsibility after his father was diagnosed with cancer in 2013, and was promoted to chairman in July 2018. After Bob McNair died in November 2018, Janice succeeded her husband as principal owner, while Cal took over the franchise's day-to-day operations. He was officially made chief executive officer in January 2019.

During McNair's early tenure as Texans CEO, the team employed Jack Easterby, who was originally hired in April 2019 as the Texans' executive vice president of team development before being promoted to executive vice president of football operations and serving as interim general manager. Sports Illustrated noted that Easterby seemed to have a strong influence on McNair, in part due to their shared religious faith, and interviewed Texans staffers, some of whom portrayed the CEO as bumbling or overly trusting. After Easterby's hiring, there were many high-profile departures of Texans employees, including those directly involved in football operations such as general manager Brian Gaine and head coach Bill O'Brien (the former fired after less than two years as GM), and those working for the franchise in other areas, such as J. J. Moses, Amy Palcic, and Jamey Rootes. In a December 2020 statement, Cal McNair took responsibility for each decision to fire employees. Easterby left the Texans in October 2022, a decision which the team characterized as mutual, and which was praised by members of both the organization and the Houston media.

During the 2020 season, in which Houston went 4–12, McNair had several meetings with Texans quarterback Deshaun Watson, during which Watson requested that his opinion on head coach and general manager candidates be taken into account. Subsequently, the Texans hired Nick Caserio as general manager without consulting Watson, and did not include his preferred head coach candidate, Eric Bieniemy, on their original interview list. According to McNair, the organization had been waiting for Caserio's list of head coach candidates; McNair said that the quarterback was "disappointed in the (lack of) communication during the hiring process" and apologized for doing and saying things which "created mistrust". Due to these events, Watson requested a trade from the Texans. After he sat out the entire 2021 NFL season because of sexual assault accusations made against him by multiple female massage therapists, Watson was eventually traded to the Cleveland Browns. The Texans faced lawsuits from many of these women alleging that the franchise had enabled its quarterback's behavior, which the McNairs chose to settle without admitting wrongdoing.

In October 2021, Michael Silver of Bally Sports reported that in May of that year, McNair had referred to COVID-19 with the racially insensitive term "China virus" at a charity golf tournament benefitting the Houston Texans Foundation. McNair apologized for what he termed "an inappropriate choice of words."

Houston's on-field struggles in 2020 and 2021 pushed McNair to make changes to the organization's relationship with its fans, and he stated that he was optimistic about the team's chances in 2022. After the Texans performed poorly, head coach Lovie Smith was fired, making it the second consecutive season Houston fired its head coach after one season in charge, and McNair announced his intent to be more involved in the hiring process for the next coach. Ultimately, the franchise selected DeMeco Ryans for the vacant position. After the selection of quarterback C. J. Stroud with the second pick in the 2023 NFL draft, McNair denied rumors that he had directed the members of the front office to take Stroud.

On March 26, 2024, McNair succeeded his mother as principal owner of the Texans.

== Philanthropy ==
McNair has supported a wide variety of charitable causes. He is a member of the board of the foundation named for his parents, as well as a director of the Houston Texans Foundation. In September 2018, after their son Jackson died during infancy, Cal and Hannah McNair hosted a benefit at a Houston restaurant for the 80th anniversary of March of Dimes which raised $450,000. They have also supported the YMCA, Houston Food Bank, United Way, and Boys & Girls Clubs of America.

== Personal life ==
McNair's first marriage, which produced three daughters, ended in divorce in 2002. Six years later, he met Hannah Hartland, whom he married in 2009. He has had four children with her, giving him a total of seven.

McNair has mentioned that he enjoys being outdoors. He has participated in big-game hunting of animals including buffalo, elephants, leopards, and lions.

In November 2022, McNair was inducted into the Cy-Fair High School Athletic Hall of Honor.
