= Easterby =

Easterby is a surname. Notable people with the surname include:

- Guy Easterby (born 1971), Irish rugby union player
- Jack Easterby (born 1983), American football executive
- Mick Easterby (born 1931), British racehorse trainer
- Peter Easterby (1929–2025), British racehorse trainer
- Simon Easterby (born 1975), Irish rugby union player
- Tim Easterby (born 1961), British racehorse trainer
