= List of Houston Texans head coaches =

ALL Houston Texans Head Coaches

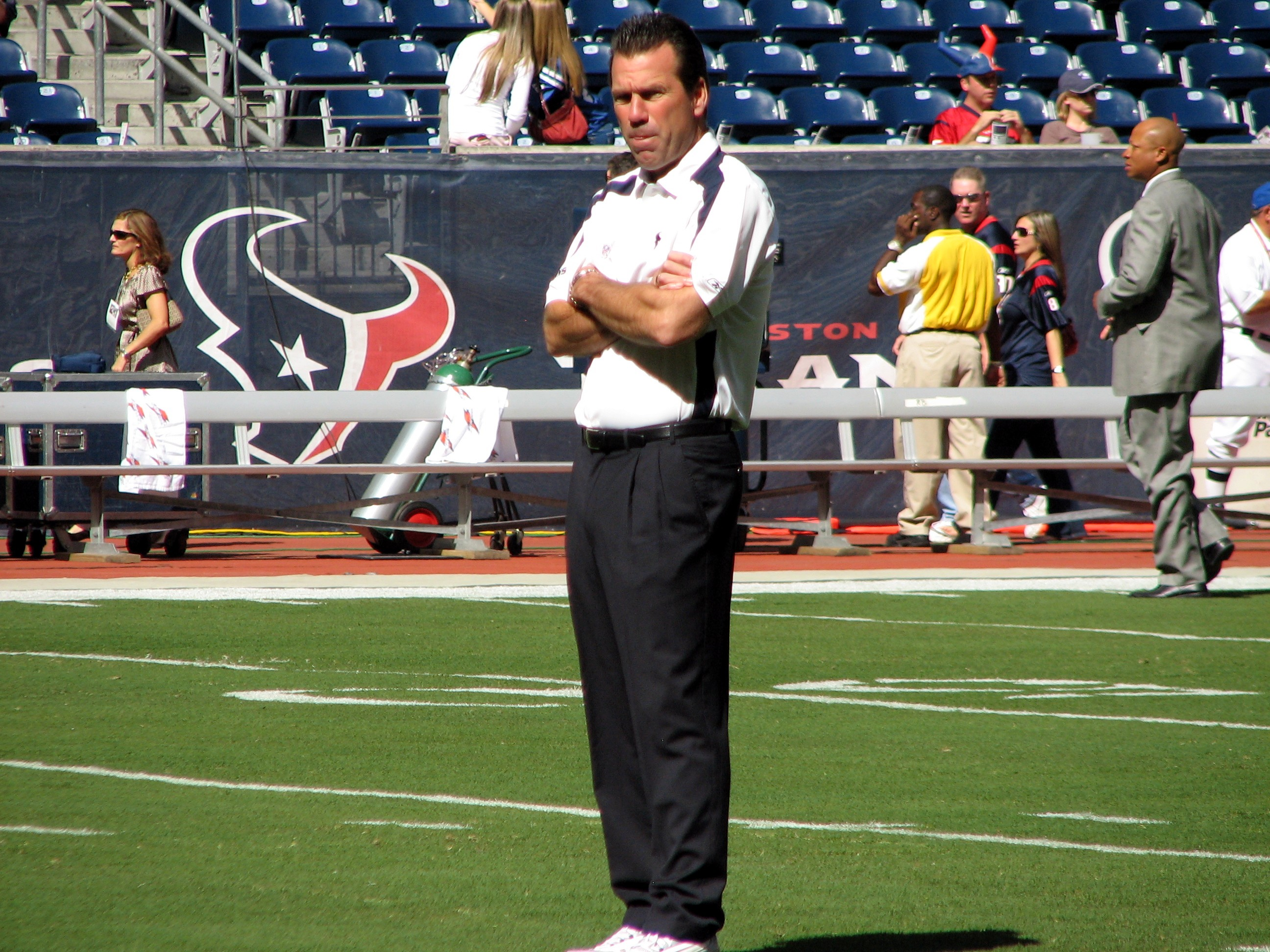
Gary Kubiak led the Texans to their 1st division championship and 1st playoff win.

There have been six head coaches of the Houston Texans, a professional American football team based in Houston, Texas, United States. The Texans play in the South Division of the American Football Conference (AFC) in the National Football League (NFL).

In 2002, the Texans entered the NFL as an expansion team, with Dom Capers (2002–05) as the team's first head coach. Capers was selected, in part, due to his success in having led the expansion Carolina Panthers to the playoffs in just their second season in the league.

After three straight seasons of consistent improvement, the Texans took a major step backward in 2005 with a 2–14 finish. At the end of the season, Capers was fired and replaced with Gary Kubiak (2006–2013), then the offensive coordinator for the Denver Broncos. Kubiak, a Houston native and alumnus of nearby Texas A&M, would eventually become the longest-tenured head coach in franchise history, coaching 125 games and posting a 61–64 record.

Kubiak earned several distinctions as head coach, having led the Texans to their first non-losing season (2007), their first winning season (2009), and their first division title, playoff appearance, and playoff win (2011). In both 2011 and 2012, the Texans won the AFC South and the first game of the playoffs but lost the divisional game the following week.

In 2013, the Texans started the season 2–0, but then lost their next 11 games. Kubiak was fired mid-season, on December 6, 2013 and was replaced on an interim basis by defensive coordinator Wade Phillips (2013, 3 games).

During the 2013 off-season, Bill O'Brien (2014–2020) was hired to be the Texans' next head coach. O'Brien had previously served as head coach at Penn State and as offensive coordinator under Bill Belichick with the New England Patriots.

In the 2020 season, the Texans started 0-4, and O'Brien was fired and replaced by interim head coach Romeo Crennel during the regular season on October 5, 2020.

During the 2020 offseason, David Culley was hired as the Texans' next head coach. Culley had previously served as an assistant head coach and wide receivers coach with multiple NFL franchises, most recently the Baltimore Ravens. However, he was fired after just one season, with the team posting a 4–13 record during his brief tenure.

During the 2021 offseason, Lovie Smith was hired as the Texans' next head coach. Smith had previously served as associate head coach and defensive coordinator during the 2021 season. Smith was previously the head coach of the Chicago Bears and the Tampa Bay Buccaneers, as well as the Illinois Fighting Illini. Smith, however, was fired after posting a 3–13–1 record, becoming the second-straight Texans head coach to be fired after one season.

During the 2022 offseason, DeMeco Ryans was hired as the Texans' next head coach; Ryans served as defensive coordinator with the San Francisco 49ers. Ryans also was drafted in 2006 by the Texans where he played for six seasons.

== Key ==
#	Number of coaches (Note: A running total of the number of coaches of the Texans. Thus, any coach who has two or more terms as head coach is only counted once.)
Yrs	Years coached
First	First season coached
Last	Last season coached
GC	Games Coached
W	Wins
L	Loses
T	Ties
Win%	Win – Loss percentage
*	Spent entire NFL head coaching career with the Texans

== Coaches ==
Note: Statistics are accurate through end of 2025 NFL season.

#	Image	Name	Term (Note: Each year is linked to an article about that particular NFL season.)		Regular season					Playoffs			Accomplishments	Ref.
#	Image	Name	First	Last	GC	W	L	T	Win%	GC	W	L	Accomplishments	Ref.
1		Dom Capers	2002	2005	64	18	46	0	.281	—				
2		Gary Kubiak	2006	2013 (Note: After 13 games of the 2013 season, with the Texans at 2–11 (.154), Kubiak was fired as head coach and replaced by defensive coordinator Wade Phillips on an interim basis. Phillips had earlier served as interim coach against the Arizona Cardinals, after Kubiak took a medical leave of absence after collapsing during a game against the Indianapolis Colts.)	125	61	64	0	.488	4	2	2	2 AFC South Championships (2011, 2012); 2 Playoff Berths	
–		Wade Phillips	2013		3	0	3	0	.000	—				
3		Bill O'Brien*	2014	2020 (Note: After 4 games of the 2020 season, with the Texans at 0–4 (.000), O'Brien was fired as head coach and replaced by Assistant head coach Romeo Crennel on an interim basis.)	100	52	48	0	.520	6	2	4	4 AFC South Championships (2015, 2016, 2018, 2019); 4 Playoff Berths	
–		Romeo Crennel	2020		12	4	8	0	.333	—				
4		David Culley*	2021		17	4	13	0	.235	—				
5		Lovie Smith	2022		17	3	13	1	.206	—				
6		DeMeco Ryans*	2023–present		51	32	19	0	.627	6	3	3	2 AFC South Championships (2023, 2024); 3 Playoff Berths	
