= Bob McNair =

American businessman (1937–2018)

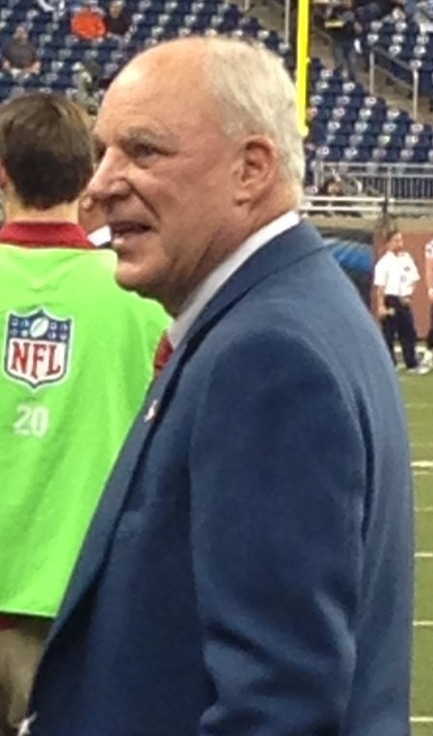
- McNair in 2012
- Born: January 1, 1937; Tampa, Florida, U.S.
- Died: November 23, 2018 (aged 81); Houston, Texas, U.S.
- Education: University of South Carolina
- Occupation: Businessman
- Spouse: Janice McNair
- Children: 4; including Cal

Robert C. McNair (January 1, 1937 – November 23, 2018) was an American businessman, philanthropist, and the founding owner of the National Football League (NFL)'s Houston Texans.

== Early life and education ==
McNair grew up in Forest City, North Carolina, a town of about 7,500 in the foothills of western North Carolina. He graduated from the University of South Carolina in Columbia, where he was initiated into the Sigma Chi fraternity. He graduated in 1958 with a Bachelor of Science degree. His wife, Janice, attended nearby Columbia College.

== Professional career ==
The McNairs were residents of Houston, Texas beginning in 1960. He spent most of his 20s and 30s as a struggling salesman and unsuccessful entrepreneur whose businesses all failed. He eventually broke through to success when he founded the cogeneration company Cogen Technologies in 1984, which he sold in 1999 to Enron. At the time of his death, McNair retained ownership of power plants in New York and West Virginia. McNair served as chairman and chief executive officer of The McNair Group, a financial and real estate firm that is headquartered in Houston, Texas, and as the owner of Palmetto Partners, Ltd., a private investment company that manages the McNairs' public and private equity investments. In June 2000, McNair formed a biotechnology investment firm, Cogene Biotech Ventures, where he served as company chairman.

In 1997, McNair was interested in bringing a National Hockey League (NHL) expansion team to Houston alongside Houston Aeros owner Chuck Watson but the bid ultimately failed.

He was rumored to be interested in buying a soccer club in the United Kingdom, and twice went to visit St Andrews, home of Championship team, Birmingham City F.C., who were up for sale at the time. On January 3, 2014, a consortium headed by McNair made a bid to purchase Reading F.C. of the Championship, but were unsuccessful.

According to Forbes, he had a net worth of $3.8 billion in November 2017.

== Houston Texans owner ==
Committed to bringing the NFL back to the city of Houston after the Oilers left the city to become the Tennessee Titans in 1996, McNair formed Houston NFL Holdings in 1998. On October 6, 1999, the NFL announced that the 32nd NFL franchise had been awarded to McNair. This team would become the Houston Texans, who began play in 2002. They won their first AFC South title in 2011, en route to four titles in six seasons. McNair was influential in bringing Super Bowl XXXVIII and Super Bowl LI to Houston's NRG Stadium in 2004 and 2017, respectively.

On October 29, 2017, in a game against the Seattle Seahawks, the majority of the Texans' players kneeled during the national anthem after McNair had commented about having the "inmates running the prison" during a league owner meeting regarding the ongoing protests by NFL players during the anthem. McNair apologized, stating that he was not referring to the players, but rather to the "relationship between the league office and team owners." It was the first time a Texans player had knelt during the anthem.

== Public service and recognition ==
Robert McNair was a member of the Texas Business Hall of Fame and was a current or past member of the boards of trustees of a number of institutions, including Rice University, Baylor College of Medicine, Houston Grand Opera, the Museum of Fine Arts, the Center for the American Idea, and other Houston area organizations. On September 12, 2007, McNair gave $100 million to Baylor College of Medicine to recruit top scientists and physicians. He was a recipient of the Anti-Defamation League's Torch of Liberty Award. McNair is a primary backer of Sigma Chi's Horizons leadership institute. McNair donated over $1 million towards the completion of McNair Field, which hosts his hometown Forest City Owls, a collegiate summer wooden bat team in the Coastal Plain League. McNair threw out the first pitch in the stadium's opening night (May 29, 2008), and the Owls beat the Gastonia Grizzlies, 4–2. In 1998, the McNairs established the McNair Scholar Program at the University of South Carolina. In 1999 Robert McNair received an honorary doctor of humane letters degree from the university.

=== Robert and Janice McNair Foundation ===
The Robert and Janice McNair Foundation, established in 2015, provides gifts to create centers for entrepreneurship at universities throughout the United States. In September 2016 the foundation had established entrepreneurship teaching centers at Columbia College, Northwood University, Houston Baptist University, the University of St. Thomas, and the University of South Carolina, as we well as a research center at Rice University's Baker Institute.

=== Robert and Janice McNair Educational Foundation ===
In 1989, he and his wife established the Robert and Janice McNair Educational Foundation. The goal of the foundation was to remove some of the financial barriers that were preventing Rutherford County High school graduates from attending college. The first beneficiaries were the class of 1990. To date, the McNair foundation has awarded approximately $2.6 million in financial aid.

== Political contributions ==
According to one tally, McNair was Senate Majority Leader Mitch McConnell's largest donor from the period from January 1, 2009, to September 30, 2015, contributing $1,502,500. He also donated to several other Republican Party candidates. In 2015, he donated $10,000 to a group working to repeal a citywide equal rights ordinance in Houston. After being criticized, McNair withdrew the donation.

== Personal life and death ==
McNair and his wife Janice had four children together: sons Cal and Cary, and daughters Ruth and Melissa.

McNair died on November 23, 2018. He had been diagnosed with skin cancer in 1994 and had been in treatment for various cancers throughout that span, and had largely withdrawn from the team's operations in the last months of his life. McNair's wife Janice became principal owner of the Texans, and represents the team in owners meetings. Their son Cal McNair became president and CEO, and served as operating head of the franchise until Janice transferred principal ownership of the team to him in 2024.
