= Ross Blacklock =

American football player (born 1998)

Profile
- Position: Defensive end

Personal information
- Born: July 9, 1998 (age 28); Missouri City, Texas, U.S.
- Listed height: 6 ft 3 in (1.91 m)
- Listed weight: 290 lb (132 kg)

Career information
- High school: Elkins (Missouri City, Texas)
- College: TCU (2016–2019)
- NFL draft: 2020: 2nd round, 40th overall pick

Career history
- Houston Texans (2020–2021); Minnesota Vikings (2022); Jacksonville Jaguars (2023); Indianapolis Colts (2023)*; Tennessee Titans (2023); New York Giants (2024)*; Atlanta Falcons (2026)*
- * Offseason or practice squad member only

Awards and highlights
- First-team All-Big 12 (2019); Freshman All-American (2017); Big 12 Defensive Freshman of the Year (2017)

Career NFL statistics as of 2024
- Total tackles: 40
- Sacks: 3.0
- Forced fumbles: 1
- Pass deflections: 2
- Stats at Pro Football Reference

Ross Blacklock (born July 9, 1998) is an American professional football defensive end. He played college football for the TCU Horned Frogs.

== Early life ==
Blacklock's father, Jimmy, played for and later served as a coach for the Harlem Globetrotters. Growing up in Missouri City, Texas, Blacklock became a football star at Elkins High School. Following his senior season for the Knights, he was selected to play in the 2016 U.S. Army All-American Game and verbally committed to play college football at TCU during the broadcast of the game.

== College career ==
After redshirting during his first season on campus in Fort Worth, Blacklock became a full-time starter as a redshirt freshman in 2017, helping lead the Frogs to the program's first-ever berth in the Big 12 Championship Game and a win in the 2017 Alamo Bowl over Stanford. His individual performance earned him Big 12 Defensive Player of the Year honors as well as Freshman All-American honors from the Football Writers Association of America.

In August 2018, Blacklock suffered an injury caused him to miss his entire sophomore season. Nine months later, he was cleared by doctors to return for his junior season in 2019. Following a junior season where he was named to the first-team All-Big 12, Blacklock announced that he would forgo his senior season and declare for the 2020 NFL draft.

== Professional career ==
Pre-draft measurables
Height	Weight	Arm length	Hand span	Wingspan	40-yard dash	10-yard split	20-yard split	20-yard shuttle	Three-cone drill	Vertical jump	Broad jump
6 ft 3 1/8 in (1.91 m)	290 lb (132 kg)	32 3/8 in (0.82 m)	9 3/4 in (0.25 m)	6 ft 6 3/4 in (2.00 m)	4.90 s	1.70 s	2.86 s	4.67 s	7.77 s	29.0 in (0.74 m)	8 ft 11 in (2.72 m)
All values from NFL Combine

=== Houston Texans ===
Blacklock was selected in the second round of the 2020 NFL draft with the 40th pick by the Houston Texans, their first choice in the draft. The Texans originally obtained this pick in the trade that sent DeAndre Hopkins to the Arizona Cardinals for David Johnson.

In Week 2 against the Baltimore Ravens, Blacklock was ejected from the game late in the fourth quarter after throwing a punch. In his first year as a professional, Blacklock did not live up to expectations. He finished his first season with 14 tackles, including one tackle for a loss, and no sacks.

=== Minnesota Vikings ===
On August 30, 2022, Blacklock and a seventh-round pick were traded to the Minnesota Vikings for a sixth-round pick. He was waived by Minnesota on August 29, 2023.

=== Jacksonville Jaguars ===
On September 4, 2023, Blacklock was signed to the Jacksonville Jaguars practice squad. He was released on October 23.

=== Indianapolis Colts ===
On October 24, 2023, the Indianapolis Colts signed Blacklock to their practice squad. He was released on October 30.

=== Tennessee Titans ===
On November 15, 2023, the Tennessee Titans signed Blacklock to their practice squad. He was signed to the active roster on December 30.

=== New York Giants ===
On December 10, 2024, the New York Giants signed Blacklock to their practice squad. He signed a reserve/future contract with New York on January 6, 2025. On April 15, Blacklock was released by the Giants.

=== Atlanta Falcons ===
Blacklock signed with the Atlanta Falcons on May 11, 2026 after a tryout during rookie minicamp. He was released by the Falcons on July 30.
