= Jack Easterby =

American football executive (born 1983)

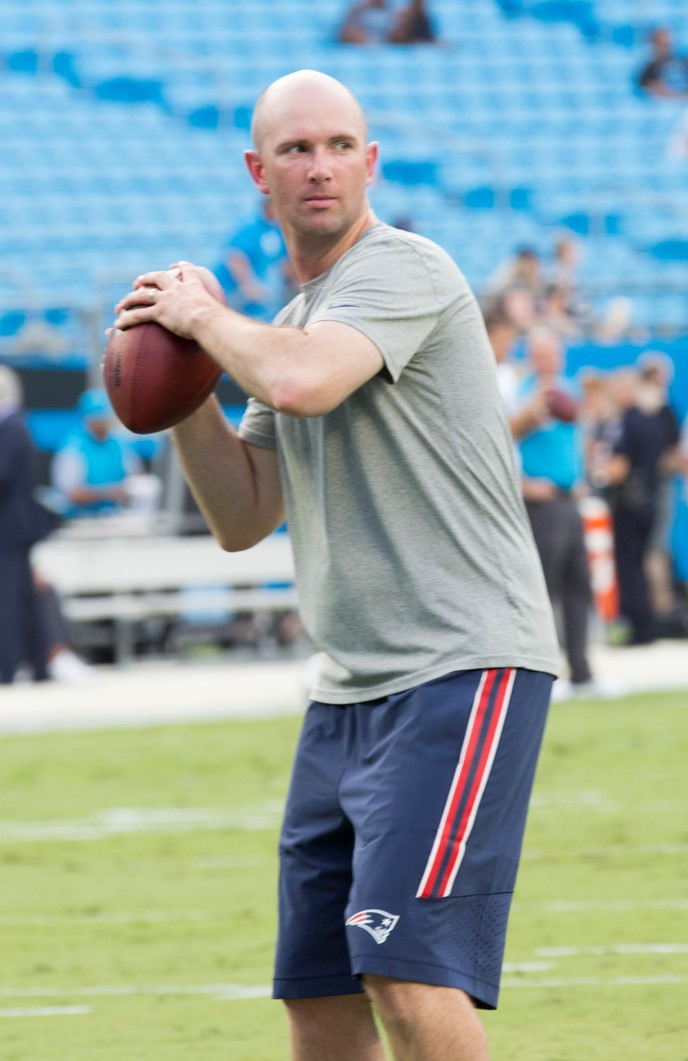
- Easterby in 2016

Personal information
- Born: March 24, 1983 (age 43); Columbia, South Carolina, U.S.

Career information
- High school: A.C. Flora
- College: Newberry College; Liberty University

Career history
- Jacksonville Jaguars (2004) Operations intern; South Carolina (2005–2010) Character coach; Kansas City Chiefs (2011–2012) Chaplain; New England Patriots (2013–2018) Character coach and team development; Houston Texans (2019–2020) Executive vice president of team development; Houston Texans (2020–2022) Executive vice president of football operations

Jack Easterby (born March 24, 1983) is the former executive vice president of football operations for the Houston Texans of the National Football League (NFL). Prior to joining the Texans in 2019, he served as chaplain and in character-coaching roles. From 2013 to 2018, Easterby filled various leadership roles with the New England Patriots.

== Education and early career ==
A Columbia, South Carolina, native, Easterby lettered in basketball and golf at A.C. Flora High School and Newberry College and studied theology at Erskine College and Liberty University. He was named Student-Athlete of the Year by the American Legion in his senior year, and was awarded the Scholar Athlete award by the South Atlantic Conference (SAC) in 2005. He also received several awards related to his ministry, including the Men's Golf Character Award from SAC, and the Campus Ministry Award and Fellowship of Christian Athletes Award from Newberry College. He served as an operations intern with the Jacksonville Jaguars in the summer of 2004.

== Football career ==
=== South Carolina Gamecocks (2005–2011) ===
In 2005, while working as an academic tutor at the University of South Carolina, Easterby was hired by Dave Odom to serve as the character coach of Gamecocks men's basketball team, and worked extensively with Dawn Staley and the women's team. He worked with both teams during five postseason appearances, including the 2012 Sweet Sixteen NCAA Tournament. During his time with the Gamecocks men's basketball team, they won the 2005 National Invitation Tournament. He also served as character coach for the Gamecocks baseball College World Series' teams in 2010 and 2011.

=== Kansas City Chiefs (2011–2012) ===
After leaving South Carolina, Easterby took up a role as chaplain for the Kansas City Chiefs in 2011. Placekicker Ryan Succop, who attended South Carolina when Easterby was there, recommended him to Scott Pioli for the position. He ministered to the team following the murder-suicide of Jovan Belcher.

=== New England Patriots (2013–2018) ===
Easterby was hired by the New England Patriots in 2013, in part to deal with the Aaron Hernandez crisis. Throughout his tenure he was praised by staff, and was the only person to hold the position of character coach in the NFL. He described his work as "to serve the players mentally, physically and help them as people”. He also helped the team with drills, draft evaluations, helped orient new players, and held Bible studies and religious services. He grew close to head coach Bill Belichick as well as the players and was a major part of their football operations staff.

He was described as having a major role in the team's success by Patriots' players. The team went on to win several championships, including Super Bowl XLIX, LI, and LIII. The Patriots won the AFC Championship in 2014, 2016, 2017 and 2018.

=== Houston Texans (2019–2022) ===
Represented by agent Bob LaMonte, Easterby developed a reputation as a leader in the NFL in culture building as well as strategic planning. He was hired by the Houston Texans in April 2019, after they outbid other NFL and NBA teams, such as the Miami Dolphins, for his services. Houston Chronicle sportswriter Brian T. Smith described Easterby as being involved in "Everything. Personnel. Planning. Player pep talks. Daily life conversations, media-access issues and the general, overall state of the Texans."

Easterby, along with coach and general manager Bill O'Brien, worked to overhaul the roster, with Easterby handling the contract negotiations. Easterby also reportedly oversaw a new locker room project with the Texans, and building renovations led by CEO and owner Cal McNair within NRG Stadium.

On January 28, 2020, Easterby was put in charge of football operations, handling "everything from team logistics to salary cap management to sport science, equipment, video, player development and security for football operations." After O'Brien was fired on October 5, 2020, Easterby assumed the GM role on an interim basis, According to ESPN, Easterby was chosen by McNair to guide the team through the transitional period after O'Brien's firing. Easterby continued this role until Nick Caserio was hired.

Easterby's rapid rise in football drew significant media attention. Some sports media outlets published criticisms of Easterby from anonymous team personnel. Many members of the Texans' leadership praised Easterby's work with the team, including Caserio, who described the criticism of Easterby as "unjust."

Easterby served on the leadership team for the Bill Walsh Diversity Coaching Fellowship program, and advocates for promoting diversity within the NFL. In 2016, he delivered the keynote address for the Boston Business Journal Leaders in Diversity Awards.

On October 17, 2022, Easterby left the Texans. A statement by the team described the parting as mutual. Easterby later attributed the firing to criticism from fans.

Easterby's presence and influence in the Texans organization was cause for concern in the eyes of Andre Johnson and DeAndre Hopkins, two of the team's all-time great wide receivers.

== Personal life ==
The son of Jimmy and Betsy Easterby, Jack Easterby is married to Holly, and has two daughters.
