= Janice McNair =

American businesswoman and NFL team owner (1936–2026)

- Born: September 30, 1936; Myrtle Beach, South Carolina, U.S.
- Died: July 14, 2026 (aged 89); Houston, Texas, U.S.
- Education: Columbia College
- Occupation: Businesswoman
- Known for: Owner of the Houston Texans
- Spouse: Bob McNair (1937–2018)
- Children: 4, including Cal McNair
- Football career

Career history
- Houston Texans (2018–2024) Senior Chair/Principal owner
- Executive profile at Pro Football Reference

Janice Suber McNair (September 30, 1936 – July 14, 2026) was an American businesswoman who was the co-founder and owner of the Houston Texans, a position which she assumed after the death of her husband Bob McNair in 2018 until officially passing it to her son Cal McNair in 2024.

== Early life ==
McNair was born on September 30, 1936, and was raised in Myrtle Beach, South Carolina, and attended Columbia College, a private women's liberal arts college. It was in her college years in which she met her future husband Bob.

== Career ==
McNair was the right-hand to her husband throughout much of his career, including when he founded Cogen Technologies, which was sold in 1999 to Enron and CalPERS. She co-founded the Texans in 1999 alongside her husband.

Following her husband's death in 2018, McNair became the team's principal owner, with the title of "senior chair". She delegated most responsibility for team operations to her son Cal, who became CEO and operating head of the franchise.

She was one of ten female NFL team owners or co-owners. The others are Virginia Halas McCaskey (Chicago Bears), Kim Pegula (Buffalo Bills), Carol Davis (Las Vegas Raiders), Dee Haslam (Cleveland Browns), Amy Adams Strunk (Tennessee Titans), Gayle Benson (New Orleans Saints), Sheila Ford Hamp (Detroit Lions), Denise DeBartolo York (San Francisco 49ers) and Jody Allen (Seattle Seahawks).

McNair's reported net worth is believed to be at US$4 billion. As of 2019, she was the richest female sports owner in the United States.

Late in 2023, McNair's son Robert Cary McNair Jr. applied for a guardianship over his mother. Janice McNair and her other son Cal responded with documents stating that the appointment of a guardian was unnecessary, and requested that documents related to the case be sealed. The lawsuit was jointly dropped on February 26, 2024.

On March 26, 2024, Janice transferred principal ownership of the Texans to her son Cal.

== Philanthropy ==
In 1989, Janice McNair and her husband established the Robert and Janice McNair Educational Foundation. The goal of the foundation was to remove some of the financial barriers that were preventing Rutherford County High school graduates from attending college. The first beneficiaries were the class of 1990. To date, the McNair foundation has awarded approximately $2.6 million in financial aid.

In August 2019, McNair donated $5 million to Pro Vision Inc, a community building project in the Sunnyside neighborhood of Houston. It was reported to be the largest donation ever made by an NFL owner.

During the COVID-19 pandemic in Houston, McNair donated $1 million to the Houston Rent Relief fund to help apartment residents in Houston facing eviction during the pandemic economic recession.

== Death ==
McNair died on July 14, 2026, at the age of 89.
