= David Johnson (running back) =

American football player (born 1991)

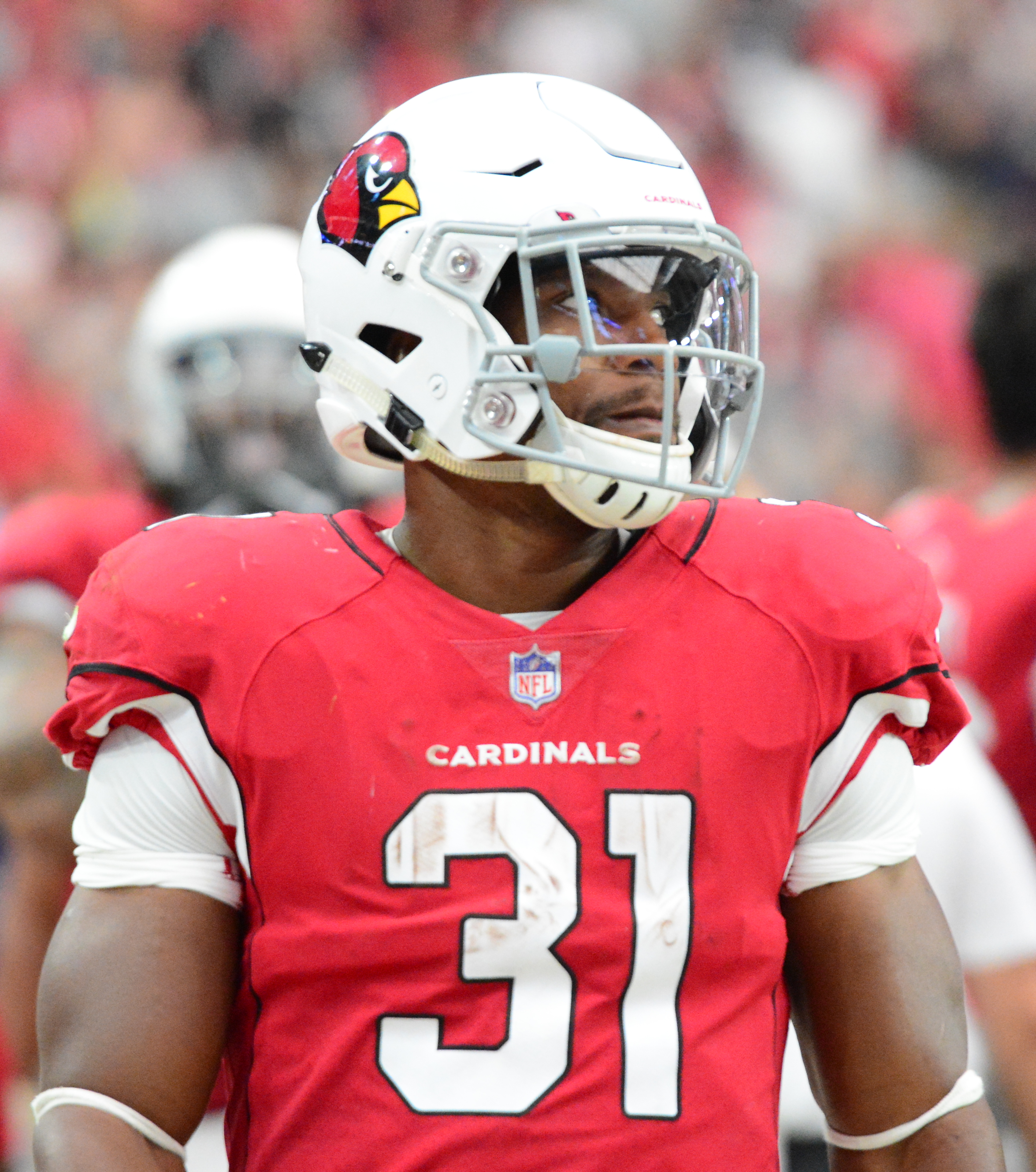
- Johnson with the Arizona Cardinals in 2018

No. 31, 28
- Position: Running back

Personal information
- Born: December 16, 1991 (age 34); Clinton, Iowa, U.S.
- Listed height: 6 ft 1 in (1.85 m)
- Listed weight: 224 lb (102 kg)

Career information
- High school: Clinton (Clinton, Iowa)
- College: Northern Iowa (2010–2014)
- NFL draft: 2015: 3rd round, 86th overall pick

Career history
- Arizona Cardinals (2015–2019); Houston Texans (2020–2021); New Orleans Saints (2022)

Awards and highlights
- First-team All-Pro (2016) (Note: Selected as the flex); Second-team All-Pro (2016) (Note: Selected as a running back); Pro Bowl (2016)

Career NFL statistics
- Rushing yards: 4,071
- Rushing average: 4
- Rushing touchdowns: 39
- Receptions: 277
- Receiving yards: 2,805
- Receiving touchdowns: 18
- Return yards: 622
- Return touchdowns: 1
- Stats at Pro Football Reference

David Jerome Johnson Sr. (born December 16, 1991) is an American former professional football player who was a running back in the National Football League (NFL). He played college football for the Northern Iowa Panthers and was selected by the Arizona Cardinals in the third round of the 2015 NFL draft. Johnson spent five seasons with the Cardinals, earning Pro Bowl and All-Pro selections in 2016. He also played for the Houston Texans and New Orleans Saints.

== Early life ==
Johnson attended Clinton High School in Clinton, Iowa, where he was a three-sport star in football, track, and basketball. He played as a running back and defensive back for the River Kings high school football team. He set numerous school records including touchdowns in a season, career receptions, career receiving yards, career and single-season total offense and single game record for touchdowns. As a senior, Johnson led Clinton to an 11–1 record while accounting for a school-record 42 touchdowns and was selected 2009 Outstanding Offensive Player for Clinton. In four seasons, Johnson compiled 4,682 rushing yards (on 5.4 yards per carry) and 49 rushing touchdowns along with 1,734 receiving yards and another 14 receiving touchdowns. Johnson took up kick returning as a senior, averaging 36.5 yards per attempt and returning one for a touchdown. He was invited to play at the 2010 Shrine Bowl All-Star Game, where he showed excellent vision and speed. Academically, Johnson maintained over a 3.0 grade point average throughout high school.

In track & field, Johnson was a two-time Drake and state qualifier. He earned second-place finishes in both the 4 × 200 and 4 × 400 relays at the 2009 Drake Relays, while also recording a personal-best time of 11.03 seconds in the 100-meter dash. At the 2009 Iowa State T&F Championships, he took ninth in the preliminary rounds of the 200-meter dash with a time of 22.34 seconds. Also a starter on the basketball team, Johnson was named second-team All-conference as a junior. He helped lead the River Kings to the state tournament during his senior season, where he averaged a team-best 15.7 points and 7.9 rebounds per game. He was a first-team All-league selection in the Mississippi Athletic Conference and a third-team All-State pick by the Iowa Newspaper Association. He was also a second-team All-state selection by The Des Moines Register.

Johnson committed to the University of Northern Iowa to play college football. The only other school to offer Johnson an athletic scholarship was Illinois State.

== College career ==
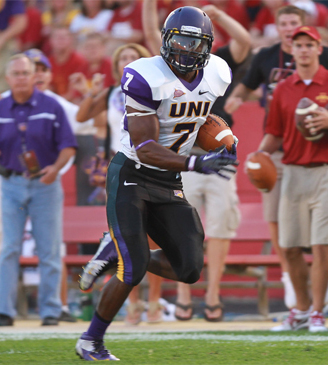
Johnson at Northern Iowa

Johnson attended Northern Iowa from 2010 to 2014. After redshirting in 2010, he played in 13 games, with five starts, as a redshirt freshman for the Panthers in 2011. He had 179 rushes for 822 yards with nine rushing touchdowns and also had 33 receptions for 422 yards and three touchdowns. As a sophomore in 2012, Johnson started seven of 12 games. He finished the year with 1,021 rushing yards and 13 rushing touchdowns. As a junior, Johnson started 10 of 11 games and rushed for 1,286 yards on 222 carries. As a senior, Johnson rushed for 1,553 yards on 287 carries with 17 rushing touchdowns and returned 12 kickoffs for 438 yards (36.5 average) and one touchdown. During his senior season, he set numerous school records, including career rushing yards, career rushing touchdowns, and career all-purpose yards.

== Professional career ==
=== Pre-draft ===
Following a standout career at UNI, Johnson declared for the 2015 NFL draft and was projected to be a second or third round pick after a promising showing during the NFL Combine and UNI's Pro Day.

Pre-draft measurables
Height	Weight	Arm length	Hand span	Wingspan	40-yard dash	10-yard split	20-yard split	20-yard shuttle	Three-cone drill	Vertical jump	Broad jump	Bench press
6 ft 0 5/8 in (1.84 m)	224 lb (102 kg)	31 1/4 in (0.79 m)	9 5/8 in (0.24 m)	6 ft 4 1/2 in (1.94 m)	4.50 s	1.57 s	2.61 s	4.27 s	6.82 s	41.5 in (1.05 m)	10 ft 7 in (3.23 m)	25 reps
All values from NFL Combine

=== Arizona Cardinals ===
==== 2015 ====
The Arizona Cardinals selected Johnson in the third round (86th overall) in the 2015 NFL draft. He was the seventh running back to be selected that year. The Arizona Cardinals originally planned to draft Nebraska running back Ameer Abdullah in the second round (55th overall) and were speaking to Abdullah on the phone when they discovered the Detroit Lions had selected him with their second round pick (54th overall). After failing to draft Abdullah, they changed their draft plans and opted to select David Johnson. Johnson was the only player drafted from Northern Iowa in that year. He was the highest drafted player out of Northern Iowa since Jacksonville Jaguars selected offensive lineman Brad Meester with the 60th overall pick in the 2000 NFL draft. On May 18, 2015, Johnson was signed to a four-year, $2.9 million contract with a $639,373 signing bonus and $639,373 guaranteed.

Johnson opened the season as the fourth string running back behind veterans Andre Ellington, Chris Johnson, and Stepfan Taylor. On September 13, 2015, Johnson played in his first career game, against the New Orleans Saints, and finished the season opener with one reception for a 55-yard touchdown. The following week, he received more playing time against the Chicago Bears after Ellington was injured the previous game. Johnson carried the ball five times for 42 yards and scored his first career rushing touchdown in a 48–23 victory over the Bears. In addition, he returned a kickoff 108 yards for a touchdown in the game.

December 6, 2015, marked Johnson's first career start after Chris Johnson suffered a fractured tibia in the previous game. In his first start, he had 22 attempts, 99 rushing yards, two receptions, 21 receiving yards, and a touchdown reception in a 27–3 win over the St. Louis Rams.

On December 20, 2015, Johnson had his third consecutive start and recorded a season-high 29 carries for 187 yards and three rushing touchdowns, while also recording four receptions for 42 yards in a 40–17 victory over the Philadelphia Eagles on NBC Sunday Night Football.

The Cardinals made the playoffs and earned a first-round bye. In the Divisional Round against the Green Bay Packers, he finished with 35 rushing yards and 43 receiving yards in the 26–20 overtime victory. On January 24, 2016, Johnson rushed for 60 yards on 15 carries and a rushing touchdown as well as 68 receiving yards on nine receptions against the Carolina Panthers in the 49–15 loss in the NFC Championship. He finished the season having carried 125 times for 581 yards with eight touchdowns, and caught 36 passes for 457 yards and four touchdowns.

==== 2016 ====
Johnson experienced a breakout season in 2016. He posted 15 straight games with at least 100 yards from scrimmage, matching the Lions' Barry Sanders (1997) for the longest single-season streak in NFL history. In the season opener against the New England Patriots, he had 89 rushing yards, one rushing touchdown, and 43 receiving yards. In the next game, against the Tampa Bay Buccaneers, he had 45 rushing yards to go along with three receptions for 98 yards. In the following game, against the Buffalo Bills, he had 83 rushing yards and two rushing touchdowns to go along with three receptions for 28 yards. He recorded 124 scrimmage yards (83 rushing and 41 receiving) in the next game against the Los Angeles Rams. Four days later, he had a season-high 157 rushing yards and two rushing touchdowns in victory over the San Francisco 49ers. In the next game, against the New York Jets, he had 111 rushing yards and three rushing touchdowns. In the next game, a hard-fought 6–6 tie with the Seattle Seahawks, he had 33 carries for 113 yards to go along with eight receptions for 58 yards on NBC Sunday Night Football. He was named NFC Offensive Player of the Month for October after averaging 145.2 rushing and receiving yards through five games along with five touchdowns. On November 13, against the San Francisco 49ers, he had 55 rushing yards, one rushing touchdown, 46 receiving yards, and one receiving touchdown. On November 20, against the Minnesota Vikings, he had 103 rushing yards, one rushing touchdown, 57 receiving yards, and one receiving touchdown. In the next game, against the Atlanta Falcons, he had 58 rushing yards to go along with eight receptions for 103 yards and a receiving touchdown. In Week 13 against the Washington Redskins, Johnson recorded nine receptions for 91 yards and a touchdown and ran for 91 yards on 18 carries for another touchdown, earning him NFC Offensive Player of the Week. Johnson finished the season having carried 293 times for 1,239 rushing yards with 16 rushing touchdowns. He was ranked seventh in the NFL for rushing yards, and ranked second in the NFL for rushing touchdowns. Johnson also finished the season having caught 80 passes for 879 yards and four touchdowns. He had the most receiving yards among running backs and ranked 38th among all NFL players in receiving yards. He was named First-team All-Pro and was also named to his first Pro Bowl. He was ranked 12th by his fellow players on the NFL Top 100 Players of 2017.

On January 1, 2017, Johnson left the field on a cart in the first quarter of the Cardinals final regular season game of 2016 against the Rams with an injured left knee after getting tackled awkwardly. The injury looked very serious but ended up only being an MCL sprain and would not require surgery.

==== 2017 ====
On September 10, 2017, in the season opener against the Lions, Johnson injured his left wrist during a play in the third quarter, and left the game. The next day, it was revealed that Johnson's wrist was dislocated, which required surgery and 2–3 months to recover. He was placed on injured reserve on September 12, 2017. On November 22, the Cardinals announced that Johnson would not return for the rest of 2017.

==== 2018 ====
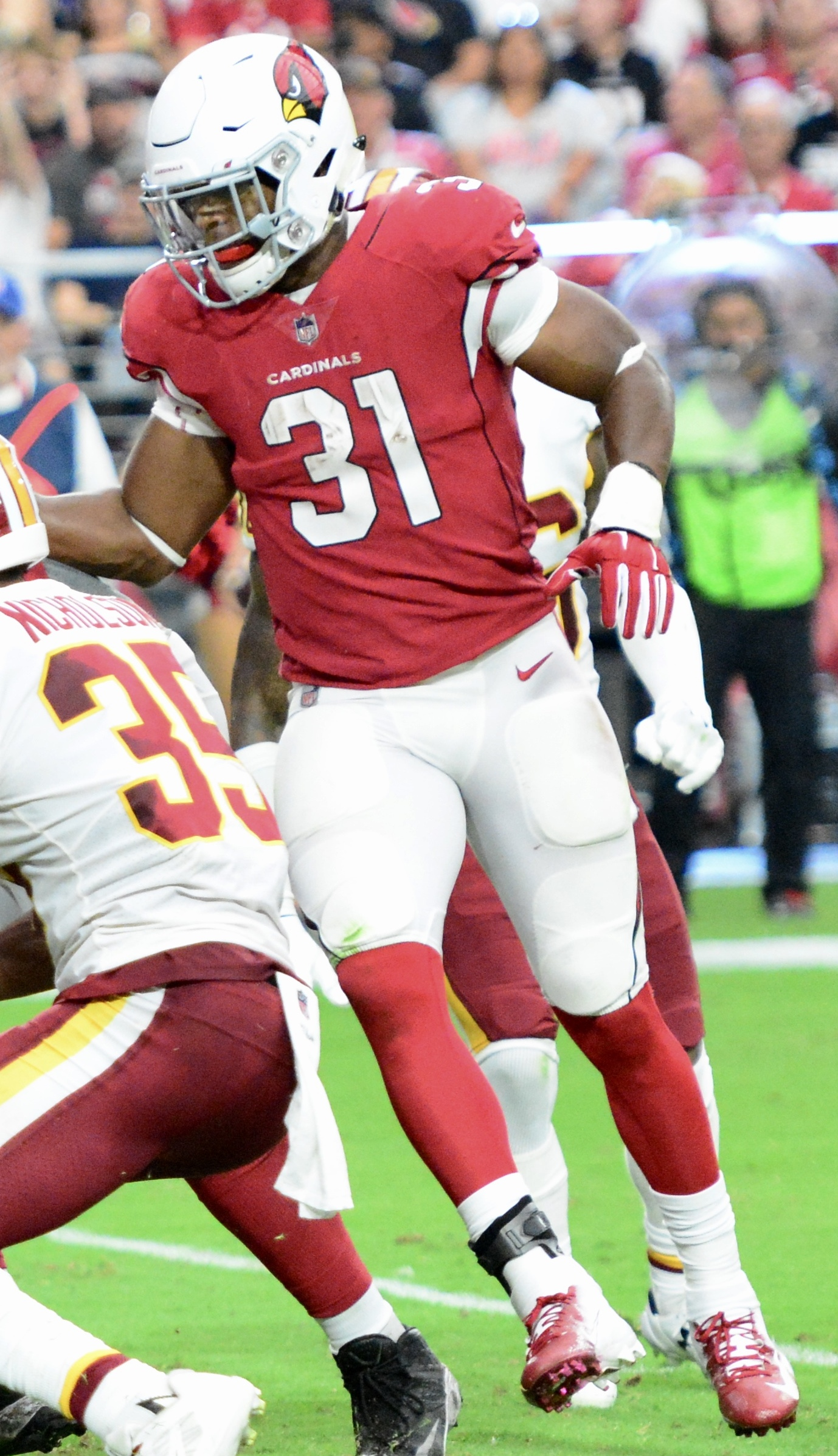
Johnson in a game against the Washington Redskins in 2018.

On September 8, 2018, Johnson signed a three-year, $39 million contract extension with the Cardinals with $30 million guaranteed. In a Week 4 loss to the Seahawks, he recorded 112 scrimmage yards and a rushing touchdown. In a Week 5 victory over the 49ers, Johnson recorded his eighth career game with at least two rushing touchdowns. In the next game against the Vikings, Johnson scored a touchdown for the fifth time in four games. In Week 11, against the Oakland Raiders, Johnson rushed for 137 yards and recorded one catch for 17 yards in a 23–21 loss. He finished the season with 940 rushing yards and seven touchdowns along with 50 receptions for 446 yards and three touchdowns.

==== 2019 ====
In Week 1 against the Lions, Johnson had 137 scrimmage yards and a receiving touchdown in the 27–27 tie. Overall, in the 2019 season, Johnson recorded 345 rushing yards and two rushing touchdowns to go along with 36 receptions for 370 receiving yards and four receiving touchdowns.

=== Houston Texans ===
==== 2020 ====
On March 20, 2020, the Cardinals traded Johnson along with a second-round pick and fourth-round pick in 2021 to the Houston Texans in exchange for star wide receiver DeAndre Hopkins and a fourth-round pick. Reception to the trade was highly critical of the Texans, as well as the head coach at the time, Bill O’Brien, with many sportswriters calling it one of the worst of all time from their perspective, while simultaneously praising the Cardinals for "robbing" the Texans.

On September 10, 2020, Johnson made his Texans debut, scoring the first touchdown of the 2020 NFL season against the Kansas City Chiefs and recording 109 scrimmage yards (77 rushing and 32 receiving) in the 34–20 loss. He was placed on injured reserve on November 14, 2020, with a concussion. He was activated on December 5, 2020. He was placed on the reserve/COVID-19 list by the team on December 11, 2020, and activated on December 16. In Week 15 against the Indianapolis Colts, Johnson recorded 27 rushing yards and 106 receiving yards during the 27–20 loss. In Week 16 against the Cincinnati Bengals, Johnson rushed for 128 yards and a rushing touchdown and recorded a receiving touchdown during the 37–31 loss. Johnson finished the 2020 season with 147 carries for 691 rushing yards and six rushing touchdowns and recorded 33 receptions for 314 receiving yards and two receiving touchdowns.

==== 2021 ====
In the 2021 season, Johnson finished with 67 carries for 228 rushing yards and 32 catches for 225 receiving yards and a receiving touchdown.

=== New Orleans Saints ===
On November 16, 2022, Johnson was signed to the practice squad of the New Orleans Saints. He was promoted to the active roster on November 19. He was signed to the active roster on December 12.

Johnson announced his retirement from professional football on May 19, 2024.

== Career statistics ==
=== NFL ===
Legend
**Bold**	Career high

==== Regular season ====
Year	Team	Games		Rushing					Receiving					Fumbles	
Year	Team	GP	GS	Att	Yds	Avg	Lng	TD	Rec	Yds	Avg	Lng	TD	Fum	Lost
2015	ARI	**16**	5	125	581	4.6	47T	8	36	457	**12.7**	55T	**4**	4	1
2016	ARI	**16**	**16**	**293**	**1,239**	4.2	**58T**	**16**	**80**	**879**	11.0	**58**	**4**	**5**	**3**
2017	ARI	1	1	11	23	2.1	6	0	6	67	11.2	24	0	2	1
2018	ARI	**16**	**16**	258	940	3.6	53	7	50	446	8.9	40	3	3	2
2019	ARI	13	9	94	345	3.7	18	2	36	370	10.3	31	**4**	1	1
2020	HOU	12	12	147	691	**4.7**	48	6	33	314	9.5	32	2	2	1
2021	HOU	13	4	67	228	3.4	15	0	32	225	7.0	16	1	1	1
2022	NO	5	0	12	24	2.0	5	0	4	47	11.8	21	0	1	1
Total		92	63	1,007	4,071	4.0	58T	39	277	2,803	10.1	58	18	19	11

==== Postseason ====
Year	Team	Games		Rushing					Receiving					Fumbles	
Year	Team	GP	GS	Att	Yds	Avg	Lng	TD	Rec	Yds	Avg	Lng	TD	Fum	Lost
2015	ARI	2	2	30	95	3.2	23	1	15	111	7.4	16	0	0	0
Total		2	2	30	95	3.2	23	1	15	111	7.4	16	0	0	0

=== College ===
Season	Team	GP	Rushing				Receiving		
Season	Team	GP	Att	Yds	Avg	TD	Rec	Yds	TD
2010	Northern Iowa	Redshirt							
2011	Northern Iowa	13	179	822	4.6	9	33	422	3
2012	Northern Iowa	11	178	1,021	5.7	13	32	383	5
2013	Northern Iowa	11	222	1,286	5.8	10	38	393	4
2014	Northern Iowa	14	287	1,553	5.4	17	38	536	2
Totals		50	866	4,682	5.4	49	141	1,734	14

== Personal life ==
Johnson is married to Meghan Johnson. They have three children together.

Johnson is the founder and president of The Johnson Family’s Mission 31 Foundation. The organization seeks to “provide opportunities, support and resources to seriously-ill children and their families by offering daily support and life-changing experiences”.
