= Jamey Rootes =

American sports executive (1966–2022)

- Born: May 9, 1966; Stone Mountain, Georgia, U.S.
- Died: August 22, 2022 (aged 56)
- Education: Clemson University; Indiana University Bloomington (MBA)
- Occupation: Sports executive
- Years active: 1996–2021
- Known for: President of the Houston Texans
- Title: President, Houston Texans (2001–2021)

Jamey Rootes (May 9, 1966 – August 22, 2022) was an American sports executive. He served as a long-term president of the Houston Texans of the National Football League. He was responsible for the business operations of the team. Before joining the Texans, he was president and general manager of the Columbus Crew of Major League Soccer from the first year of MLS in 1996 and left the Crew after the 2000 season. He went to Clemson University, where he was a member of the Beta Theta Pi fraternity and played on the soccer team that won national championships both in 1984 and 1987. He earned an MBA at Indiana University Bloomington, where he also served as an assistant soccer coach. Rootes worked for the Texans for over 20 years before announcing his resignation in February 2021. Rootes worked as chief executive officer of the Houston Dynamo FC of Major League Soccer and Houston Dash of National Women's Soccer League before stepping down 18 days later. Rootes died on August 22, 2022, at the age of 56.
