= Bill O'Brien (American football) =

American football coach (born 1969)

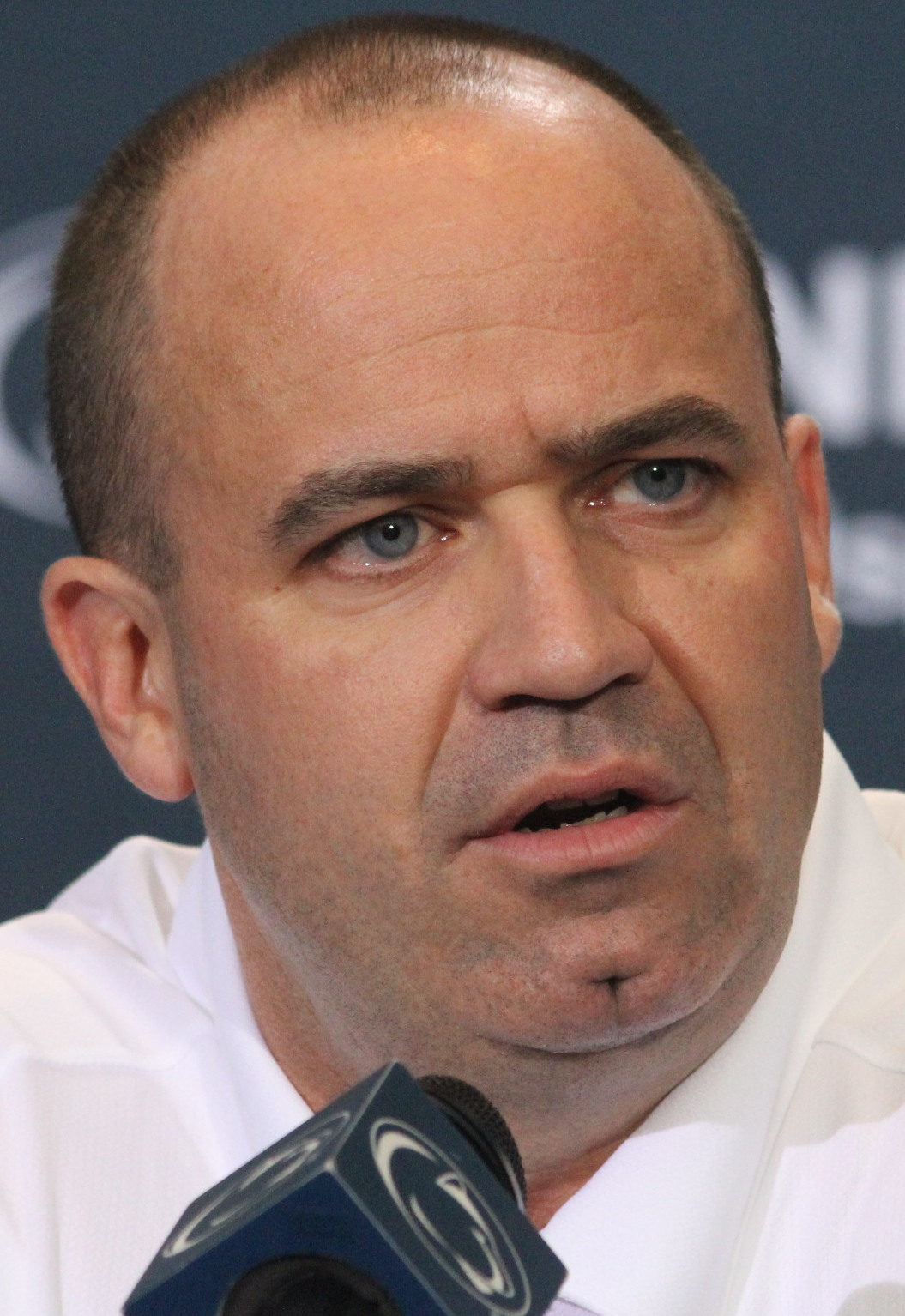
- O'Brien with Penn State in 2012

Current position
- Title: Head coach
- Team: Boston College
- Conference: ACC
- Record: 14–22
- Annual salary: $5 million

Biographical details
- Born: October 23, 1969 (age 57); Boston, Massachusetts, U.S.

Playing career
- 1991–1992: Brown
- Position: Defensive end/Linebacker

Coaching career (HC unless noted)
- 1993: Brown (TE)
- 1994: Brown (ILB)
- 1995–1997: Georgia Tech (GA)
- 1998–2000: Georgia Tech (RB)
- 2001–2002: Georgia Tech (OC/QB)
- 2003–2004: Maryland (RB)
- 2005–2006: Duke (OC/QB)
- 2007: New England Patriots (OA)
- 2008: New England Patriots (WR)
- 2009–2010: New England Patriots (QB)
- 2011: New England Patriots (OC/QB)
- 2012–2013: Penn State
- 2014–2020: Houston Texans
- 2021–2022: Alabama (OC/QB)
- 2023: New England Patriots (OC/QB)
- 2024–present: Boston College

Administrative career (AD unless noted)
- 2020: Houston Texans (GM)

Head coaching record
- Overall: 29–31 (college); 52–48 (NFL)
- Bowls: 0–1
- Tournaments: NFL: 2-4

Accomplishments and honors

Awards
- Paul "Bear" Bryant Award (2012); Dave McClain / Hayes–Schembechler Coach of the Year (2012); Maxwell Coach of the Year (2012)

William James O'Brien (born October 23, 1969), is an American football coach who is currently the head coach at Boston College. Previously, he was the head coach of the Houston Texans from 2014 to 2020, and at Penn State from 2012 to 2013. Prior to Boston College, O'Brien was the offensive coordinator at the University of Alabama and for the New England Patriots. After the Patriots parted ways with longtime head coach Bill Belichick at the end of the 2023 season, O'Brien was not retained by the team.

O'Brien began his coaching career in 1993 at Brown University before spending more than a decade coaching in the Atlantic Coast Conference (ACC). He joined the New England Patriots in 2007, eventually serving as quarterbacks coach and offensive coordinator in 2011. In 2012, O'Brien was hired by Penn State to take over a program that had just endured a child sexual abuse scandal perpetrated by one of its former coaches. In his first season as head coach, O'Brien led the team to an 8–4 record and won ESPN's National Coach of the Year award. After the 2012 season, he garnered significant interest to return to the National Football League (NFL) as a head coach and interviewed with both the Philadelphia Eagles and the Cleveland Browns. However, O'Brien decided to stay at Penn State, citing that it would send a poor message to leave after just one season. After his second season, O'Brien left Penn State to become the head coach of the Texans.

O'Brien's tenure with the Texans included a 51–31 Divisional Round loss to the eventual Super Bowl winning Kansas City Chiefs team after leading 24–0 in the second quarter, and a controversial trade of star wide receiver DeAndre Hopkins to the Arizona Cardinals. In 2020, O'Brien was fired by the Texans, and was hired by Alabama to be offensive coordinator the following year. In 2023, he was re-hired by the Patriots to be the offensive coordinator and quarterbacks coach. Following the season, O'Brien was hired by Boston College to be their head coach.

== Early life ==
O'Brien was born on October 23, 1969, in the Dorchester neighborhood of Boston, Massachusetts to John O'Brien and Anne Murphy O'Brien. He grew up in Andover, Massachusetts with his parents and two brothers, John and Tom. Growing up, Bill played Little League. After graduating from St. John's Preparatory School in Danvers, he attended Brown University in Providence, Rhode Island, where O'Brien played defensive end and linebacker for the Brown Bears from 1990 to 1992.

== Coaching career ==
=== College assistant ===
O'Brien's first coaching position was at Brown, where he coached tight ends in 1993 and inside linebackers in 1994. He then spent the next three seasons (1995–97) as an offensive graduate assistant at Georgia Tech.

O'Brien then coached the Yellow Jackets' running backs from 1998 to 2000. In 1999, running back Sean Gregory ran for 837 yards with six touchdowns. The following year, running back Joe Burns ran for 908 yards with 12 touchdowns.

From 2001 to 2002, O'Brien served as offensive coordinator and quarterbacks coach and was named an assistant head coach for the 2002 season. In 2002, O'Brien was hired as Notre Dame's offensive Coordinator before George O'Leary was dismissed. As offensive coordinator at Georgia Tech in 2001 and 2002, his teams averaged 31 and 21.5 points per game, respectively as the teams went 9–4 and 7–6. In 2001, running back Joe Burns ran for 1,165 yards with 14 touchdowns and quarterback George Godsey threw for 3,085 yards with 18 touchdowns. Under Chan Gailey in 2002, running back Tony Hollings ran for 633 yards with 11 touchdowns, and wide receiver Kerry Watkins recorded 1,050 receiving yards and five touchdowns.

In 2003, O'Brien left to coach running backs at the University of Maryland, where he spent two seasons. In 2003, running back Josh Allen ran for 922 yards and eight touchdowns while Bruce Perry ran for 713 yards and six touchdowns.

As offensive coordinator at Duke in 2005 and 2006, O'Brien's teams averaged 16.1 and 14.9 points per game. In 2006, quarterback Thaddeus Lewis threw for 2,134 yards and 11 touchdowns.

=== New England Patriots ===
After two seasons with Duke, O'Brien was hired by the New England Patriots as an offensive assistant on February 27, 2007. On February 21, 2008, he was promoted to wide receivers coach. O'Brien became the quarterbacks coach and offensive play-caller following the 2008 season after quarterbacks coach and offensive coordinator Josh McDaniels left to become head coach of the Denver Broncos. O'Brien was promoted to offensive coordinator in February 2011. He spent six years coaching within the Patriots offense and four of those six seasons as the play-caller. During this period, the Patriots offense had some of their most productive seasons, as did quarterback Tom Brady.

The Patriots gave the Jacksonville Jaguars permission to interview O'Brien for their head coaching vacancy during the Patriots' playoff bye week; O'Brien was scheduled for an interview, but never actually interviewed for the job. He instead interviewed with Penn State staff on January 5, 2012, and was offered the head coach position and signed a four-year contract to become the Nittany Lions' coach. O'Brien continued as New England's offensive coordinator through Super Bowl XLVI.

=== Penn State ===
O'Brien was hired as Penn State's 15th head football coach, replacing Joe Paterno, who had coached the team from 1966 until his dismissal in 2011. O'Brien was introduced as the head coach at a press conference on January 7, 2012.

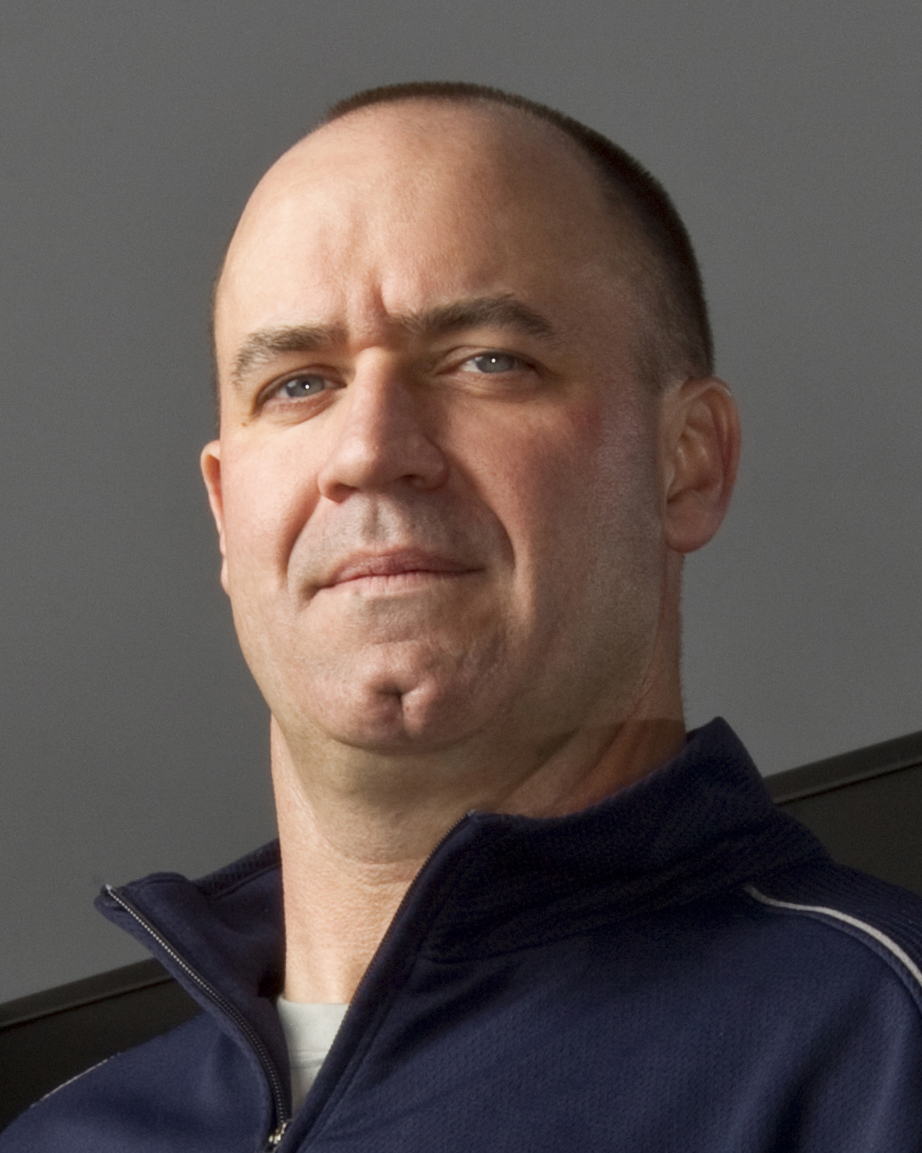
Bill O’Brien in 2012

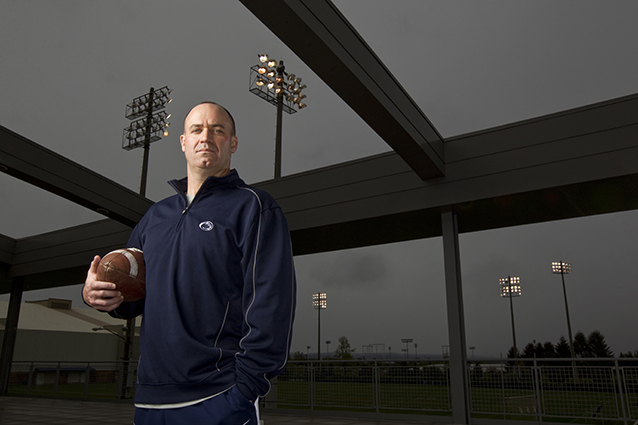
Bill O’Brien in 2012

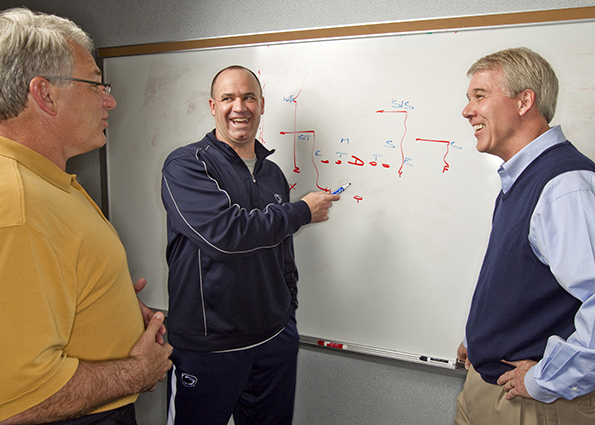
Bill O’Brien in 2012

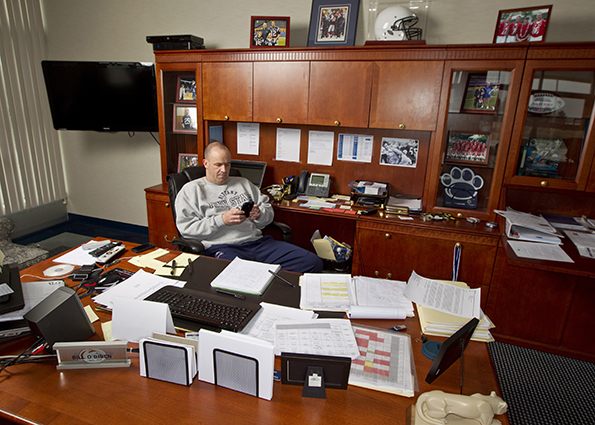
Bill O’Brien in 2012

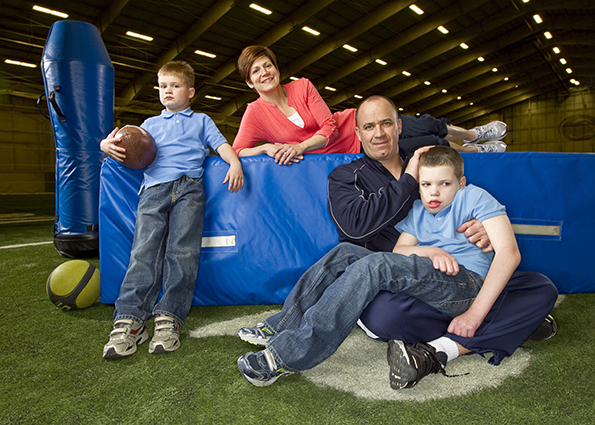
Bill O’Brien in 2012

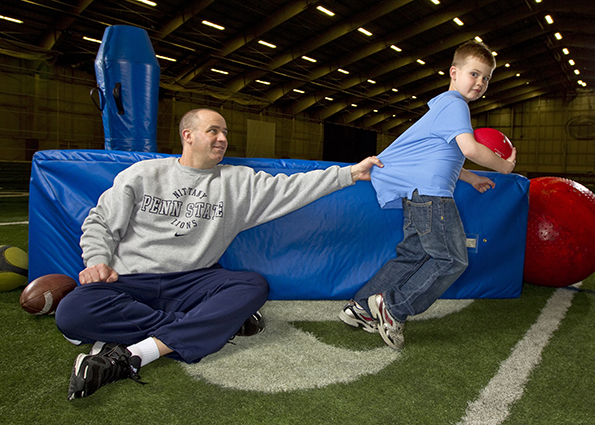
Bill O’Brien in 2012

==== Response to sanctions ====
Due to the Penn State child sex abuse scandal, the National Collegiate Athletic Association (NCAA) sanctioned Penn State with a four-year postseason ban and loss of 40 scholarships over a four-year period on July 24, 2012.

In light of these NCAA sanctions, O'Brien issued the following statement:

"Today we receive a very harsh penalty from the NCAA and as head coach of the Nittany Lions football program, I will do everything in my power to not only comply, but help guide the University forward to become a national leader in ethics, compliance and operational excellence. I knew when I accepted the position that there would be tough times ahead. But I am committed for the long term to Penn State and our student athletes. I was then and I remain convinced that our student athletes are the best in the country. I could not be more proud to lead this team and these courageous and humble young men into the upcoming 2012 season. Together we are committed to building a better athletic program and university".

Because of a clause in his contract, O'Brien received an automatic four-year extension that guaranteed an extra year for every year of sanctions put on the program.

==== 2012 ====
In O'Brien's first game as Penn State's head coach, the Nittany Lions lost to the Ohio University Bobcats by a score of 24–14. His first win as the Penn State head coach took place on September 15, 2012, with a 34–7 win against the United States Naval Academy at Beaver Stadium, University Park, PA. Despite the fallout from the Jerry Sandusky scandal, O'Brien's first season as coach at Penn State was far more successful than anticipated and resulted in a final record of 8–4. He collected the most wins for a first-year head coach in school history and was awarded Big Ten Coach of the Year on November 27, 2012.

O'Brien was named the Big Ten Coach of the Year by both the media and the coaches. On December 8, 2012, he was named the national coach of the year by ESPN. On January 17, 2013, O'Brien was awarded the 2012 Paul "Bear" Bryant College Coach of the Year Award.

=== NFL interest ===
In January 2013, O'Brien interviewed for the head coaching position with the Cleveland Browns and Philadelphia Eagles. However, he decided to remain at Penn State, stating: "I'm not a one-and-done guy. I made a commitment to these players at Penn State and that's what I am going to do. I'm not gonna cut and run after one year, that's for sure."

=== Houston Texans ===
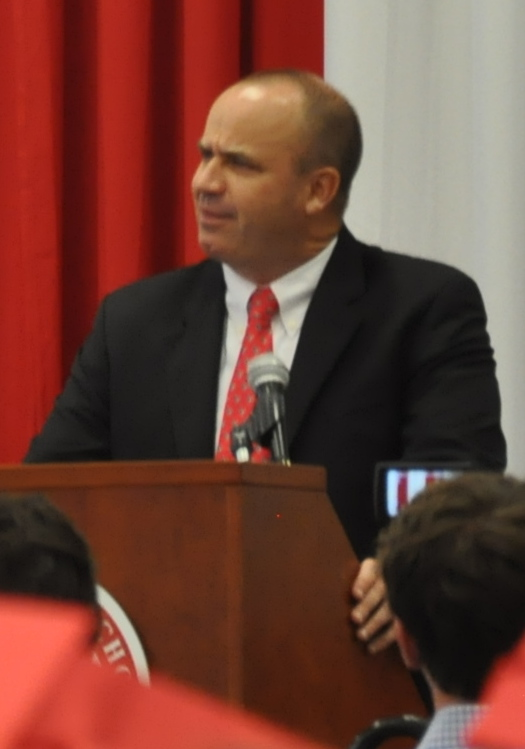
O'Brien delivering a commencement speech at St. Thomas High School in May 2016

After Houston Texans head coach Gary Kubiak was fired on December 6, 2013, multiple reports stated that O'Brien was interested in returning to the NFL. On December 29, O'Brien met with the Texans for further discussion about the head coaching job there. He was officially introduced as the Texans' head coach on January 2, 2014. The Texans had finished with a 2–14 record in 2013 and owned the first overall selection in the 2014 NFL draft, which they used on South Carolina defensive end Jadeveon Clowney.

==== 2014 season ====
O'Brien earned his first win as a head coach when the Texans beat the Washington Redskins in the season-opener by a score of 17–6. In O'Brien's first season with the team, they finished with a 9–7 record and narrowly missed the playoffs.

==== 2015 season ====
In 2015, the Texans again finished with a 9–7 record and finished atop the AFC South. During the Wild Card Round of the playoffs, the Texans were blown out 30–0 by the Kansas City Chiefs.

==== 2016 season ====
In 2016, the Texans finished with a 9–7 record for the third consecutive year and won their second consecutive AFC South title. The Texans defeated the Oakland Raiders by a score of 27–14 in the Wild Card Round, but then lost on the road in the Divisional Round by a score of 34–16 to the eventual Super Bowl champions, the New England Patriots.

==== 2017 season ====
The 2017 season marked O'Brien's first as an NFL head coach in which his team did not finish with a winning record. The Texans had a 4–12 record, losing nine of their final 10 games. The season saw the debut of quarterback Deshaun Watson, whom the Texans selected in the first round with the 12th overall pick in the 2017 NFL draft. However, Watson's season prematurely ended after he tore his ACL in practice prior to Week 9, which along with injuries to various other players contributed to the team's collapse.

==== 2018 season ====
On January 13, 2018, O'Brien received a four-year contract extension.

The Texans began the season 0–3, but then went on a nine-game winning streak and finished atop the AFC South with an 11–5 record. Their season ended when they lost to the Indianapolis Colts in the Wild Card Round by a score of 21–7.

==== 2019 season ====
In 2019, the Texans finished with a 10–6 record and captured another division title. The Texans outlasted the Buffalo Bills during the Wild Card Round with a 22–19 overtime victory, overcoming a 16–0 halftime deficit. However, they were eliminated in the Divisional Round with a 51–31 road loss to the eventual Super Bowl LIV champion Kansas City Chiefs despite a 24–0 lead in the second quarter. During the game, O'Brien was widely criticized for calling a fake punt at their own 31-yard line up 24-7, which failed and gave Kansas City momentum to complete the comeback.

On January 28, 2020, O'Brien was appointed as the Texans' general manager after the Texans had gone the entire 2019 season with the position vacant. During the offseason, O'Brien traded wide receiver DeAndre Hopkins and a fourth-round pick in the 2020 NFL draft to the Arizona Cardinals for running back David Johnson, a 2020 second-round pick, and a 2021 fourth-round pick, a move that was highly criticized.

==== 2020 season ====
Following a 0–4 start in 2020, O'Brien was fired by the Texans on October 5, 2020. He finished his tenure in Houston with a 52–48 (.520) regular-season record and a 2–4 (.333) playoff record for a combined record of 54–52 (.509).

=== Alabama ===
On January 21, 2021, O'Brien was named the offensive coordinator and quarterbacks coach at the University of Alabama under head coach Nick Saban, replacing Steve Sarkisian, who left to become the head coach at the University of Texas at Austin.

During the 2021 season, the Crimson Tide finished 13–2 (7–1 SEC) after winning the Southeastern Conference Championship against Georgia 41–24 and beating Cincinnati 27–6 in the CFP Semi-final, setting up a rematch against Georgia in the CFP National Championship game. Alabama was ultimately defeated by Georgia in the National Championship game 33–18. O’Brien's offensive unit during the 2021 season was led by quarterback Bryce Young, who set the school record for most passing yards in a single game (559) and won several Player of the Year awards in 2021, including the Heisman Trophy.

During the 2022 season, Alabama finished 11–2 (6–2 SEC) and ended the season as SEC Western Division co-champions, ranked No. 5 the AP Poll with a 45–20 victory over Kansas State in the Sugar Bowl.

Over the course of O'Brien's two years as offensive coordinator, Alabama had a record of 24–4 and averaged over 41 points per game. However, he received significant criticism from fans during his tenure at Alabama due to the team's inability to win a National Championship, as well as a lack of player development at the quarterback position, despite Young winning the Heisman and being drafted first overall in the 2023 NFL Draft by the Carolina Panthers.

=== New England Patriots (second stint) ===
On January 24, 2023, O'Brien was named the offensive coordinator and quarterbacks coach of the Patriots. The Patriots finished the 2023 season as one of the bottom-three offenses in the league and O'Brien was not retained after the departure of head coach Bill Belichick.

=== Ohio State ===
On January 19, 2024, O'Brien was named the offensive coordinator and quarterbacks coach for Ohio State. However, he never coached a practice or game for the Buckeyes as O'Brien departed for Boston College just a few weeks after the initial hiring.

=== Boston College ===
On February 9, 2024, O'Brien was hired as the head coach of Boston College, replacing Jeff Hafley, who left to become the defensive coordinator of the Green Bay Packers.

In his first season with the Eagles, O'Brien led the team to a 7–5 record in the regular season. Boston College qualified for the Pinstripe Bowl, which they lost 20–15 to Nebraska.

O'Brien's second season with Boston College had the team regress, as the Eagles finished with a 2–10 record.

== Personal life ==
O'Brien and his wife, Colleen, have been married since 1998. They have two sons: Jack and Michael. Jack, the elder son, has a rare brain disorder called lissencephaly.

== Head coaching record ==
=== College ===
Year	Team	Overall	Conference	Standing	Bowl/playoffs
Penn State Nittany Lions (Big Ten Conference) (2012–2013)
2012	Penn State	8–4	6–2	2nd (Leaders)	‡
2013	Penn State	7–5	4–4	3rd (Leaders)	‡
Penn State:		15–9	10–6	‡ Ineligible for Big Ten title, bowl game and Coaches Poll	
Boston College Eagles (Atlantic Coast Conference) (2024–present)
2024	Boston College	7–6	4–4	T–8th	L Pinstripe
2025	Boston College	2–10	1–7	T–16th	
2026	Boston College	5–6	3–4		
Boston College:		14–22	8–15		
Total:		29–31			

=== NFL ===
Team	Year	Regular season					Postseason			
Team	Year	Won	Lost	Ties	Win %	Finish	Won	Lost	Win %	Result
HOU	2014	9	7	0	.563	2nd in AFC South	–	–	–	–
HOU	2015	9	7	0	.563	1st in AFC South	0	1	.000	Lost to Kansas City Chiefs in AFC Wild Card Game
HOU	2016	9	7	0	.563	1st in AFC South	1	1	.500	Lost to New England Patriots in AFC Divisional Game
HOU	2017	4	12	0	.250	4th in AFC South	–	–	–	–
HOU	2018	11	5	0	.688	1st in AFC South	0	1	.000	Lost to Indianapolis Colts in AFC Wild Card Game
HOU	2019	10	6	0	.625	1st in AFC South	1	1	.500	Lost to Kansas City Chiefs in AFC Divisional Game
HOU	2020	0	4	0	.000	Fired	–	–	–	–
Total		52	48	0	.520		2	4	.333	

== Records and achievements ==
=== NFL ===
==== Houston Texans ====
- Most division titles: 4 (2015, 2016, 2018, 2019)
