= 2019 Houston Texans season =

18th season in franchise history

- Owner: Janice and D. Cal McNair
- General manager: Chris Olsen (interim); Bill O'Brien
- Head coach: Bill O'Brien
- Offensive coordinator: Tim Kelly
- Defensive coordinator: Romeo Crennel
- Home stadium: NRG Stadium

Results
- Record: 10–6
- Division place: 1st AFC South
- Playoffs: Won Wild Card Playoffs (vs. Bills) 22–19 (OT); Lost Divisional Playoffs (at Chiefs) 31–51
- All-Pros: WR DeAndre Hopkins (1st team)
- Pro Bowlers: QB Deshaun Watson; WR DeAndre Hopkins; OT Laremy Tunsil

Uniform
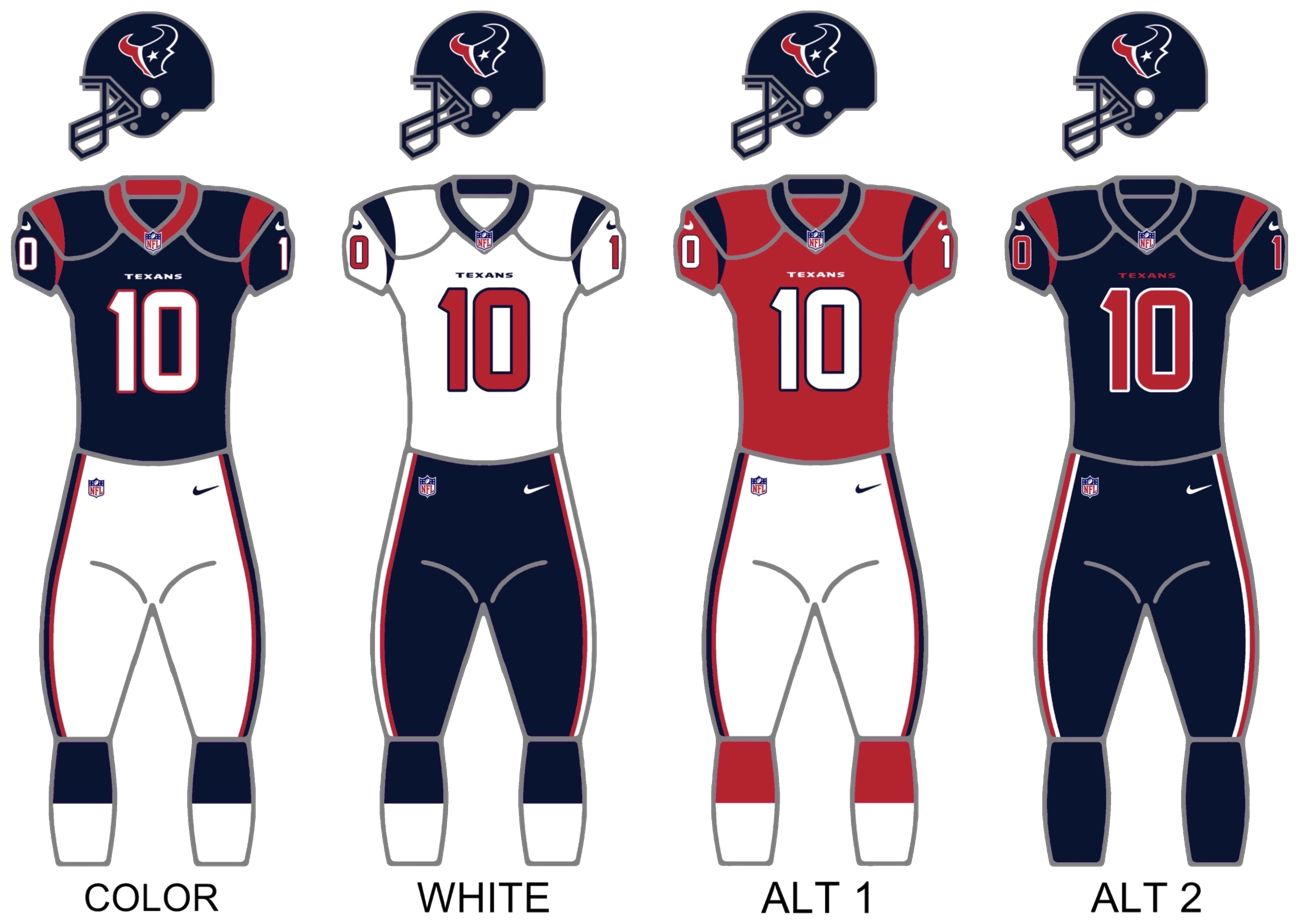

The 2019 season was the Houston Texans' 18th in the National Football League (NFL) and their sixth under head coach Bill O'Brien. It also marked the first full season without the ownership of Bob McNair, who died during the 2018 season. It was, however, the first season of full ownership of both Janice McNair and D. Cal McNair. For the first time in franchise history, the team played in London, against the Jacksonville Jaguars. On June 7, 2019, the Texans fired general manager Brian Gaine after only one season.

The Texans attempted to match their 11–5 record from 2018 despite trading defensive end Jadeveon Clowney to the Seattle Seahawks for a 3rd round pick and two players. However, they lost their third straight season opener to the New Orleans Saints. Their first win came in Week 2 against the Jaguars. With a Week 16 win over the Tampa Bay Buccaneers, the Texans clinched the AFC South for the fourth time in five seasons and their sixth overall division title. With the victory, the Texans also clinched their second 10-win season under O'Brien even though they failed to match their 11–5 record from last year.

They defeated the Buffalo Bills in the Wild Card round 22–19 in overtime despite falling behind 16–0. However, they lost to the eventual Super Bowl champion Kansas City Chiefs in the Divisional round 51–31, despite taking an early 24–0 lead prior to trailing 28–24 at halftime. This marked the fourth time that the Texans' season had ended in the AFC Divisional Playoffs.

The Texans would not have another winning season or a playoff appearance until 2023.

== Draft ==
2019 Houston Texans draft
| Round | Pick | Player | Position | College | Notes |
| 1 | 23 | Tytus Howard | OT | Alabama State | |
| 2 | 54 (Note: No. 54: Seattle → Houston (PD). Seattle traded a second-round selection (54th) as well as a 2018 third-round selection (80th) to Houston in exchange for Houston's 2018 fifth-round selection (141st) and offensive tackle Duane Brown. This trade originally included cornerback Jeremy Lane but was revised after Lane failed his physical.) | Lonnie Johnson Jr. | CB | Kentucky | from Seattle |
| 2 | 55 | Max Scharping | OT | Northern Illinois | |
| 3 | 86 | Kahale Warring | TE | San Diego State | |
| 5 | 161 | Charles Omenihu | DE | Texas | |
| 6 | 195 | Xavier Crawford | CB | Central Michigan | |
| 7 | 220 | Cullen Gillaspia | FB | Texas A&M | |
Made roster † Pro Football Hall of Fame * Made at least one Pro Bowl during career

== Staff ==
2019 Houston Texans staff
| Front office: Principal Owner and Senior Chair – Janice McNair; Chief Executive Officer – D. Cal McNair; President – Jamey Rootes; General manager – Chris Olsen (interim) / Bill O'Brien; Director of football operations – Clay Hampton; Senior vice president of football administration – Chris Olsen; Executive vice-president of Team Development – Jack Easterby; Director of college scouting – James Liipfert; Director of pro personnel – Rob Kisiel; Assistant director of pro personnel – C.J. Leak; Senior advisor to the head coach and general manager – Andre Johnson; Assistant to the head coach – Doug West; Assistant Director of Football Information Systems for Analytics - Weller Ross; Head coaches: Head coach – Bill O'Brien; Assistant head coach/defensive coordinator – Romeo Crennel; Offensive coaches: Offensive coordinator – Tim Kelly; Quarterbacks – Carl Smith; Running backs – Danny Barrett; Wide receivers – John Perry; Tight ends – Will Lawing; Offensive line – Mike Devlin; Offensive assistant – John Aylward; Offensive assistant – T. J. Yates | Defensive coaches: Defensive line – Anthony Weaver; Senior defensive assistant/outside linebackers – John Pagano; Inside linebackers – Bobby King; Secondary – Anthony Midget; Assistant secondary – D'Anton Lynn; Defensive assistant – Akeem Dent; Defensive assistant – Matt O'Donnell; Special teams coaches: Special teams coordinator – Brad Seely; Assistant special teams – Tracy Smith; Strength and conditioning: Head strength and conditioning – Mike Eubanks; Assistant strength and conditioning – Brian Cushing; Assistant strength and conditioning – Joe Distor; Assistant strength and conditioning/Sports Science coordinator – Jason George; Assistant strength and conditioning/Performance Therapist – Billy Voltaire |

== Final roster ==
2019 Houston Texans roster
| Quarterbacks (QB): 2 A. J. McCarron; 4 Deshaun Watson; Running backs (RB): 44 Cullen Gillaspia FB; 38 Buddy Howell; 23 Carlos Hyde; 25 Duke Johnson; 34 Taiwan Jones; Wide receivers (WR): 14 DeAndre Carter; 16 Keke Coutee; 15 Will Fuller; 10 DeAndre Hopkins; 11 Steven Mitchell; 12 Kenny Stills; Tight ends (TE): 88 Jordan Akins; 87 Darren Fells; 83 Jordan Thomas | Offensive linemen (OL): 77 Chris Clark T; 73 Zach Fulton G; 63 Roderick Johnson T; 65 Greg Mancz G/C; 66 Nick Martin C; 75 Elijah Nkansah T; 74 Max Scharping G; 78 Laremy Tunsil T; Defensive linemen (DL): 97 Angelo Blackson DE; 92 Brandon Dunn; 94 Charles Omenihu DE; 98 D. J. Reader NT; 95 Eddie Vanderdoes NT; 91 Carlos Watkins DE | Linebackers (LB): 50 Tyrell Adams ILB; 41 Zach Cunningham ILB; 58 Peter Kalambayi OLB; 54 Jacob Martin OLB; 55 Benardrick McKinney ILB; 59 Whitney Mercilus OLB; 52 Barkevious Mingo OLB; 57 Brennan Scarlett OLB; Defensive backs (DB): 27 Mike Adams SS; 37 Jahleel Addae S; 30 Cornell Armstrong CB; 22 Gareon Conley CB; 35 Keion Crossen CB; 39 Tashaun Gipson FS; 28 Vernon Hargreaves CB; 32 Lonnie Johnson Jr. CB; 24 Johnathan Joseph CB; 33 A. J. Moore FS; 20 Justin Reid SS; 21 Bradley Roby CB; Special teams (ST): 9 Bryan Anger P; 7 Kaʻimi Fairbairn K; 46 Jon Weeks LS | Practice squad: 89 Jerell Adams TE; 43 Anthony Chesley CB; 48 Nate Hall ILB; 17 Chad Hansen WR; 31 Karan Higdon RB; 72 Rick Leonard T; 42 Shalom Luani SS; 3 Alex McGough QB; 68 Kyle Murphy T; 36 Jonathan Owens FS; Reserve: 51 Dylan Cole ILB (IR); 53 Duke Ejiofor OLB (IR); 29 Phillip Gaines CB (IR); 71 Tytus Howard T/G (IR); 64 Senio Kelemete G (IR); 42 Chris Landrum OLB (IR); 26 Lamar Miller RB (IR); 96 Ira Savage-Lewis DE (IR); 79 David Steinmetz T (IR); 81 Kahale Warring TE (IR); 99 J. J. Watt DE (IR); 5 Joe Webb QB (IR); 19 Isaac Whitney WR (IR); Rookies in italics 53 active, 13 reserve, 10 practice squad |

== Preseason ==
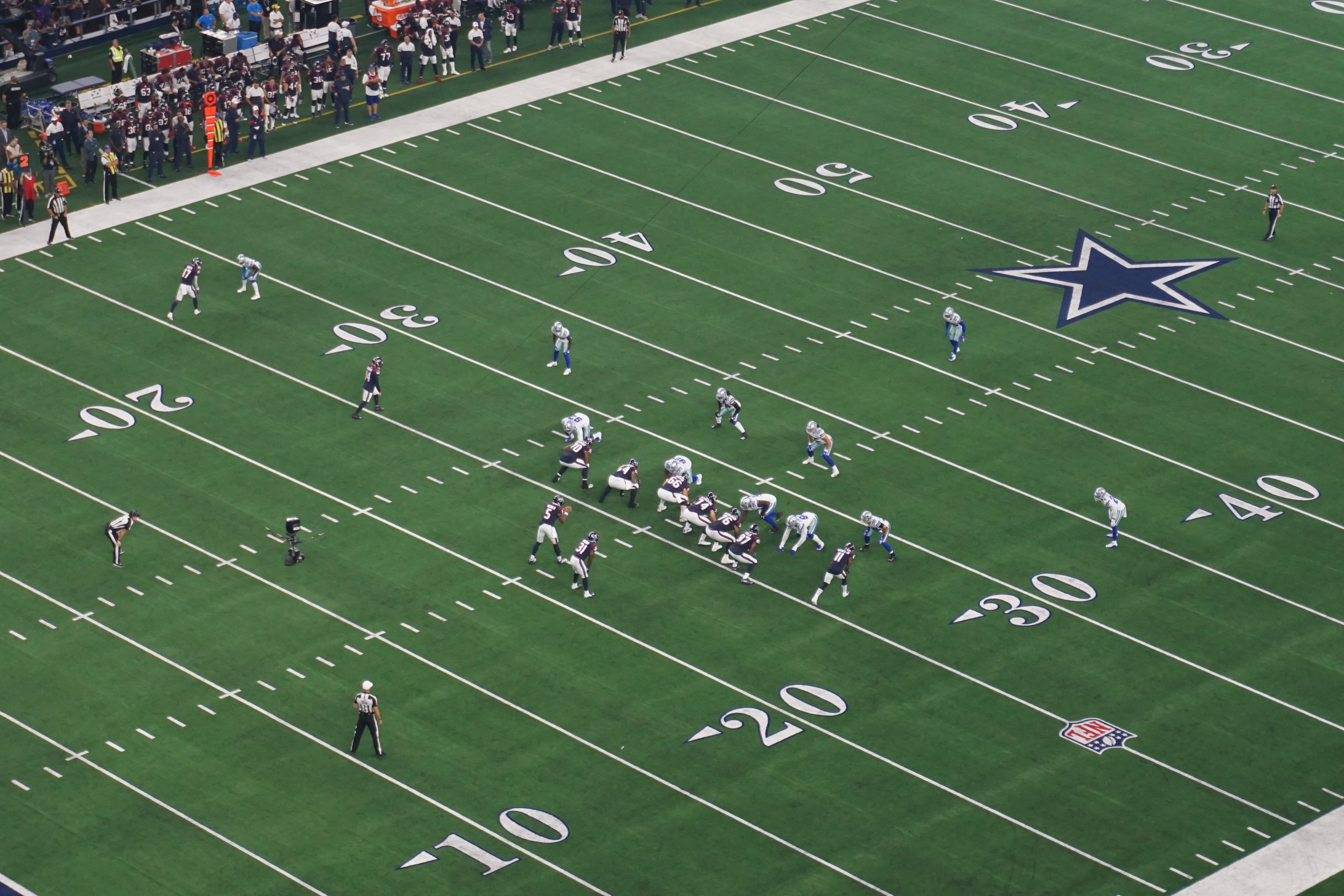
Houston on offense against Dallas

The Texans' preseason schedule was announced on April 9. Exact dates and times were finalized on April 23.

=== Schedule ===
| Week | Date | Opponent | Result | Record | Venue | Recap |
|---|---|---|---|---|---|---|
| 1 | August 8 | at Green Bay Packers | L 26–28 | 0–1 | Lambeau Field | Recap |
| 2 | August 17 | Detroit Lions | W 30–23 | 1–1 | NRG Stadium | Recap |
| 3 | August 24 | at Dallas Cowboys | L 0–34 | 1–2 | AT&T Stadium | Recap |
| 4 | August 29 | Los Angeles Rams | L 10–22 | 1–3 | NRG Stadium | Recap |

=== Game summaries ===
==== Week 1: at Green Bay Packers ====
Week One: Houston Texans at Green Bay Packers – Game summary

| Quarter | 1 | 2 | 3 | 4 | Total |
|---|---|---|---|---|---|
| Texans | 0 | 10 | 0 | 16 | 26 |
| Packers | 7 | 7 | 14 | 0 | 28 |

at Lambeau Field, Green Bay, Wisconsin

- Date: August 8
- Game time: 7:00 p.m. CDT
- Game weather: Clear, 74 °F (23 °C)
- Game attendance: 73,928
- Referee: Brad Rogers (126)
- TV: KTRK
- Recap, Game Book

Game information

First quarter

- GB – Equanimeous St. Brown fumble recovery in the end zone (Mason Crosby kick), 1:54. Packers 7–0.

Second quarter

- HOU – Damarea Crockett 1-yard run (Kaʻimi Fairbairn kick), 7:16. Tied 7–7. 14 plays, 61 yards, 6:46.
- GB – Darrius Shepherd 14-yard pass from DeShone Kizer (Sam Ficken kick), 2:43. Packers 14–7. 10 plays, 75 yards, 4:33.
- HOU – Kaʻimi Fairbairn 49-yard field goal, 0:00. Packers 14–10. 11 plays, 44 yards, 2:43.

Third quarter

- GB – J'Mon Moore 1-yard pass from Tim Boyle (Mason Crosby kick), 12:21. Packers 21–10. 6 plays, 3 yards, 2:08.
- GB – Allen Lazard 27-yard pass from Tim Boyle (Sam Ficken kick), 2:04. Packers 28–10. 5 plays, 77 yards, 3:43.

Fourth quarter

- HOU – Jerell Adams 6-yard pass from Joe Webb (kick failed, wide right), 13:07. Packers 28–16. 8 plays, 75 yards, 3:57.
- HOU – Kaʻimi Fairbairn 45-yard field goal, 12:08. Packers 28–19. 4 plays, 1 yard, 0:51.
- HOU – Josh Ferguson 1-yard run (Kaʻimi Fairbairn kick), 0:29. Packers 28–26. 4 plays, 70 yards, 1:13.

Top passers

- HOU – Joe Webb – 25/40, 286 yards, TD, 2 INT
- GB – DeShone Kizer – 8/13, 102 yards, TD

Top rushers

- HOU – Joe Webb – 6 rushes, 47 yards
- GB – Dexter Williams – 14 rushes, 62 yards

Top receivers

- HOU – Tyron Johnson – 2 receptions, 48 yards
- GB – Allen Lazard – 1 reception, 27 yards, TD

In the first preseason game of the 2019 season, the Texans had trouble holding on to the ball and committed four turnovers. Keke Coutee fumbled the ball on a muffed punt that was recovered in the end zone by Equanimeous St. Brown for a Packers' touchdown. Taiwan Jones also fumbled and lost the ball while Joe Webb threw two interceptions. Despite the turnovers, Houston out-gained Green Bay in total yards 412 vs. 237. After being down 18 points, the Texans rallied in the 4th quarter but the comeback fell short, losing to the Packers by 2.

==== Week 2: vs. Detroit Lions ====
Week Two: Detroit Lions at Houston Texans – Game summary

| Quarter | 1 | 2 | 3 | 4 | Total |
|---|---|---|---|---|---|
| Lions | 0 | 10 | 6 | 7 | 23 |
| Texans | 10 | 7 | 3 | 10 | 30 |

at NRG Stadium, Houston, Texas

- Date: August 17
- Game time: 7:00 p.m. CDT
- Game weather: None (retractable roof closed)
- Game attendance: 71,283
- Referee: Adrian Hill (29)
- TV: KTRK
- Recap, Game Book

Game information

First quarter

- HOU – DeAndre Hopkins 4-yard pass from Deshaun Watson (Kaʻimi Fairbairn kick), 9:27. Texans 7–0. Drive: 11 plays, 75 yards, 5:33.
- HOU – Kaʻimi Fairbairn 50-yard field goal, 5:32. Texans 10–0. Drive: 7 plays, 18 yards, 2:07.

Second quarter

- DET – Matt Prater 49-yard field goal, 10:58. Texans 10–3. Drive: 5 plays, 50 yards, 2:31.
- DET – Will Harris 19-yard fumble return (Matt Prater kick), 7:30. Tied 10–10.
- HOU – Vyncint Smith 31-yard pass from Joe Webb (Kaʻimi Fairbairn kick), 0:40. Texans 17–10. Drive: 4 plays, 50 yards, 1:05.

Third quarter

- HOU – Kaʻimi Fairbairn 27-yard field goal, 9:55. Texans 20–10. Drive: 7 plays, 44 yards, 3:28.
- DET – Zach Zenner 5-yard pass from David Fales (pass failed), 6:52. Texans 20–16. Drive: 7 plays, 94 yards, 3:03.

Fourth quarter

- HOU – Buddy Howell 1-yard run (Kaʻimi Fairbairn kick), 8:37. Texans 27–16. Drive: 13 plays, 82 yards, 6:12.
- DET – Mark Thompson 1-yard run (Ryan Santoso kick), 6:31. Texans 27–23. Drive: 6 plays, 75 yards, 2:06.
- HOU – Kaʻimi Fairbairn 39-yard field goal, 0:53. Texans 30–23. Drive: 5 plays, 15 yards, 1:04.

Top passers

- DET – David Fales – 12/19, 226 yards, TD
- HOU – Joe Webb – 14/25, 186 yards, TD, INT

Top rushers

- DET – Mark Thompson – 5 rushes, 25 yards, TD
- HOU – Buddy Howell – 15 rushes, 84 yards, TD

Top receivers

- DET – Andy Jones – 2 receptions, 60 yards
- HOU – DeAndre Carter – 3 receptions, 40 yards

The Texans received the opening kickoff, with their first team offense marching down the field with the drive ending with a 4-yard touchdown pass from Deshaun Watson to DeAndre Hopkins. Watson finished the game 5/7 for 60 yards and a touchdown. Jordan Ta'amu also saw some play at quarterback, finishing 1/1 for 3 yards. Joe Webb was in as Houston's quarterback for most of the game, looking improved from the previous pre-season game. The Texans' offense committed less turnovers, with the only turnovers being a Webb interception and a fumble by wide receiver Steven Mitchell.

==== Week 3: at Dallas Cowboys ====
Week Three: Houston Texans at Dallas Cowboys – Game summary

| Quarter | 1 | 2 | 3 | 4 | Total |
|---|---|---|---|---|---|
| Texans | 0 | 0 | 0 | 0 | 0 |
| Cowboys | 17 | 10 | 7 | 0 | 34 |

at AT&T Stadium, Arlington, Texas

- Date: August 24
- Game time: 6:00 p.m. CDT
- Game weather: None (retractable roof closed)
- Game attendance: 85,636
- Referee: Clete Blakeman (34)
- TV: NFLN/KTRK
- Recap, Game Book

Game information

First quarter

- DAL – Michael Gallup 12-yard pass from Dak Prescott (Brett Maher kick), 10:53. Cowboys 7–0. Drive: 6 plays, 24 yards, 2:23.
- DAL – Joe Thomas blocked punt recovery in the end zone (Brett Maher kick), 6:58. Cowboys 14–0.
- DAL – Brett Maher 36-yard field goal, 2:28. Cowboys 17–0. Drive: 7 plays, 47 yards, 3:30.

Second quarter

- DAL – Alfred Morris 1-yard run (Brett Maher kick), 4:43. Cowboys 24–0. Drive: 4 plays, 22 yards, 2:52.
- DAL – Brett Maher 23-yard field goal, 0:00. Cowboys 27–0. Drive: 8 plays, 33 yards, 0:44.

Third quarter

- DAL – Jordan Chunn 12-yard pass from Mike White (Brett Maher kick), 5:14. Cowboys 34–0. Drive: 13 plays, 73 yards, 8:05.

Fourth quarter

- No scoring plays.

Top passers

- HOU – Joe Webb – 8/21, 62 yards, 2 INT
- DAL – Cooper Rush – 15/25, 173 yards

Top rushers

- HOU – Karan Higdon – 13 rushes, 28 yards
- DAL – Tony Pollard – 6 rushes, 26 yards

Top receivers

- HOU – Jordan Thomas – 2 receptions, 33 yards
- DAL – Devin Smith – 6 receptions, 79 yards

Running back Lamar Miller was injured on the second play of the game, tearing both his ACL and MCL. The Texans' offensive line struggled all game, giving up 8 sacks for a loss of 38 yards. Deshaun Watson only saw brief playing time, fumbling the ball after being sacked by Taco Charlton; Watson would not re-enter the game after the fumble and did not attempt any passes. Joe Webb saw most of the quarterback play for Houston, throwing two interceptions and being sacked 4 times for a loss of 18 yards. Rookie free agent quarterback Jordan Ta'amu also saw play, completing 2 passes out of 5 attempts for 26 yards with no turnovers. Ta'amu was also sacked 3 times for a loss of 14 yards. The Texans only had 135 total yards with 4 turnovers while the Cowboys had 362 yards with no turnovers.

==== Week 4: vs. Los Angeles Rams ====
Week Four: Los Angeles Rams at Houston Texans – Game summary

| Quarter | 1 | 2 | 3 | 4 | Total |
|---|---|---|---|---|---|
| Rams | 7 | 0 | 8 | 7 | 22 |
| Texans | 7 | 3 | 0 | 0 | 10 |

at NRG Stadium, Houston, Texas

- Date: August 29
- Game time: 7:00 p.m. CDT
- Game weather: None (retractable roof closed)
- Game attendance: 71,162
- Referee: Walt Anderson (66)
- TV: KTRK
- Recap, Game Book

Game information

First quarter

- HOU – Jerell Adams 5-yard pass from Joe Webb (Kaʻimi Fairbairn kick), 9:31. Texans 7–0. Drive: 12 plays, 75 yards, 5:29.
- LAR – Kendall Blanton 12-yard pass from John Wolford (Greg Zuerlein kick), 2:11. Tied 7–7. Drive: 9 plays, 72 yards, 4:37.

Second quarter

- HOU – Kaʻimi Fairbairn 39-yard field goal, 3:03. Texans 10–7. Drive: 13 plays, 53 yards, 5:28.

Third quarter

- LAR – Justin Davis 4-yard run (Justin Davis run), 4:31. Rams 15–10. Drive: 12 plays, 59 yards, 6:22.

Fourth quarter

- LAR – Nsimba Webster 15-yard pass from John Wolford (Greg Zuerlein kick), 14:10. Rams 22–10. Drive: 8 plays, 75 yards, 3:27.

Top passers

- LAR – Brandon Allen – 12/17, 120 yards, 2 INT
- HOU – Joe Webb – 19/29, 163 yards, TD, INT

Top rushers

- LAR – Justin Davis – 16 rushes, 78 yards, TD
- HOU – Joe Webb – 3 rushes, 30 yards

Top receivers

- LAR – KhaDarel Hodge – 5 receptions, 76 yards
- HOU – Chad Hansen – 3 receptions, 41 yards

Two days after the game it was announced that the Texans had traded star defensive player Jadeveon Clowney to the Seattle Seahawks. The Texans received defensive ends Barkevious Mingo and Jacob Martin along with a 2020 third-round draft pick. Clowney was franchise tagged in March as a linebacker, but refused to sign the tag as he thought he should tagged a defensive end. Houston tried trading Clowney to the Miami Dolphins earlier in the week, but since Clowney had not signed his tag he had final say on where he would be traded to.

== Regular season ==
=== Schedule ===
| Week | Date | Opponent | Result | Record | Venue | Recap |
|---|---|---|---|---|---|---|
| 1 | September 9 | at New Orleans Saints | **L** 28–30 | 0–1 | Mercedes-Benz Superdome | Recap |
| 2 | September 15 | **Jacksonville Jaguars** | **W** 13–12 | 1–1 | NRG Stadium | Recap |
| 3 | September 22 | at Los Angeles Chargers | **W** 27–20 | 2–1 | Dignity Health Sports Park | Recap |
| 4 | September 29 | Carolina Panthers | **L** 10–16 | 2–2 | NRG Stadium | Recap |
| 5 | October 6 | Atlanta Falcons | **W** 53–32 | 3–2 | NRG Stadium | Recap |
| 6 | October 13 | at Kansas City Chiefs | **W** 31–24 | 4–2 | Arrowhead Stadium | Recap |
| 7 | October 20 | at **Indianapolis Colts** | **L** 23–30 | 4–3 | Lucas Oil Stadium | Recap |
| 8 | October 27 | Oakland Raiders | **W** 27–24 | 5–3 | NRG Stadium | Recap |
| 9 | November 3 | at **Jacksonville Jaguars** | **W** 26–3 | 6–3 | (United Kingdom) Wembley Stadium (London) | Recap |
| 10 | Bye | | | | | |
| 11 | November 17 | at Baltimore Ravens | **L** 7–41 | 6–4 | M&T Bank Stadium | Recap |
| 12 | November 21 | **Indianapolis Colts** | **W** 20–17 | 7–4 | NRG Stadium | Recap |
| 13 | December 1 | New England Patriots | **W** 28–22 | 8–4 | NRG Stadium | Recap |
| 14 | December 8 | Denver Broncos | **L** 24–38 | 8–5 | NRG Stadium | Recap |
| 15 | December 15 | at **Tennessee Titans** | **W** 24–21 | 9–5 | Nissan Stadium | Recap |
| 16 | December 21 | at Tampa Bay Buccaneers | **W** 23–20 | 10–5 | Raymond James Stadium | Recap |
| 17 | December 29 | **Tennessee Titans** | **L** 14–35 | 10–6 | NRG Stadium | Recap |

Note: Intra-division opponents are in bold text.

=== Game summaries ===
==== Week 1: at New Orleans Saints ====
Week One: Houston Texans at New Orleans Saints – Game summary

| Quarter | 1 | 2 | 3 | 4 | Total |
|---|---|---|---|---|---|
| Texans | 0 | 14 | 7 | 7 | **28** |
| **Saints** | 0 | 3 | 14 | 13 | **30** |

at Mercedes-Benz Superdome, New Orleans, Louisiana

- Date: September 9
- Game time: 6:10 p.m. CDT
- Game weather: None (indoor stadium)
- Game attendance: 73,039
- Referee: John Hussey
- TV announcers (ESPN): Joe Tessitore, Booger McFarland and Lisa Salters
- Recap, Game Book

Game information

**First quarter**

- No scoring plays.

**Second quarter**

- HOU – Deshaun Watson 21-yard run (Kaʻimi Fairbairn kick), 14:13. Texans 7–0. **Drive: 7 plays, 94 yards, 3:42.**
- NO – Wil Lutz 32-yard field goal, 9:22. Texans 7–3. **Drive: 11 plays, 65 yards, 4:51.**
- HOU – DeAndre Hopkins 2-yard pass from Deshaun Watson (Kaʻimi Fairbairn kick), 1:47. Texans 14–3. **Drive: 16 plays, 75 yards, 7:35.**

**Third quarter**

- NO – Latavius Murray 30-yard run (Wil Lutz kick), 12:51. Texans 14–10. **Drive: 5 plays, 83 yards, 2:09.**
- HOU – DeAndre Hopkins 16-yard pass from Deshaun Watson (Kaʻimi Fairbairn kick), 8:20. Texans 21–10. **Drive: 9 plays, 75 yards, 4:31.**
- NO – Taysom Hill 9-yard pass from Drew Brees (Wil Lutz kick), 2:39. Texans 21–17. **Drive: 11 plays, 75 yards, 5:41.**

**Fourth quarter**

- NO – Tre'Quan Smith 14-yard pass from Drew Brees (Wil Lutz kick), 14:55. Saints 24–21. **Drive: 4 plays, 49 yards, 1:53.**
- NO – Wil Lutz 47-yard field goal, 0:50. Saints 27–21. **Drive: 8 plays, 64 yards, 2:39.**
- HOU – Kenny Stills 37-yard pass from Deshaun Watson (Kaʻimi Fairbairn kick), 0:37. Texans 28–27. **Drive: 2 plays, 75 yards, 0:13.**
- NO – Wil Lutz 58-yard field goal, 0:00. Saints 30–28. **Drive: 6 plays, 35 yards, 0:37.**

**Top passers**

- HOU – Deshaun Watson – 20/30, 268 yards, 3 TD, INT
- NO – Drew Brees – 32/43, 370 yards, 2 TD, INT

**Top rushers**

- HOU – Carlos Hyde – 10 rushes, 83 yards
- NO – Alvin Kamara – 13 rushes, 97 yards

**Top receivers**

- HOU – DeAndre Hopkins – 8 receptions, 111 yards, 2 TD
- NO – Michael Thomas – 10 receptions, 123 yards

The Texans' offense started off slow, only gaining 15 total yards on their first two drives. On the Saints' second drive, Drew Brees was intercepted in the red zone by Whitney Mercilus at the Houston 4-yard line, returning it for 2 yards. On the first play following the turnover, Deshaun Watson threw a 54-yard pass to Will Fuller; the drive ended with a 21-yard touchdown run from Watson. The Texans took a one-point lead with 37 seconds left in the game, only for the Saints to drive downfield and kick a 58-yard field goal to win the game.

The Texans started 0–1, losing their third straight season opener. It was also the second straight road game that they had lost on a last-second field goal, after their Week 16 game against the Philadelphia Eagles in 2018.

==== Week 2: vs. Jacksonville Jaguars ====
Week Two: Jacksonville Jaguars at Houston Texans – Game summary

| Quarter | 1 | 2 | 3 | 4 | Total |
|---|---|---|---|---|---|
| Jaguars | 0 | 3 | 0 | 9 | **12** |
| **Texans** | 3 | 3 | 0 | 7 | **13** |

at NRG Stadium, Houston, Texas

- Date: September 15
- Game time: 12:00 p.m. CDT
- Game weather: None (retractable roof closed)
- Game attendance: 71,651
- Referee: Scott Novak
- TV announcers (CBS): Andrew Catalon and James Lofton
- Recap, Game Book

Game information

**First quarter**

- HOU – Kaʻimi Fairbairn 39-yard field goal, 1:54. Texans 3–0. **Drive: 15 plays, 71 yards, 7:15.**

**Second quarter**

- JAX – Josh Lambo 40-yard field goal, 3:17. Tied 3–3. **Drive: 10 plays, 47 yards, 5:20.**
- HOU – Kaʻimi Fairbairn 22-yard field goal, 0:00. Texans 6–3. **Drive: 11 plays, 71 yards, 3:17.**

**Third quarter**

- No scoring plays.

**Fourth quarter**

- HOU – Deshaun Watson 2-yard run (Kaʻimi Fairbairn kick), 11:35. Texans 13–3. **Drive: 4 plays, 11 yards, 1:24.**
- JAX – Josh Lambo 32-yard field goal, 6:01. Texans 13–6. **Drive: 9 plays, 61 yards, 5:34.**
- JAX – D. J. Chark 4-yard pass from Gardner Minshew (run failed), 0:30. Texans 13–12. **Drive: 14 plays, 68 yards, 3:06.**

**Top passers**

- JAX – Gardner Minshew – 23/33, 213 yards, TD
- HOU – Deshaun Watson – 16/29, 159 yards

**Top rushers**

- JAX – Gardner Minshew – 6 rushes, 56 yards
- HOU – Carlos Hyde – 20 rushes, 90 yards

**Top receivers**

- JAX – Chris Conley – 4 receptions, 73 yards
- HOU – Will Fuller – 4 receptions, 40 yards

The Texans were leading 13–6 in the second half before the Jags scored a touchdown. However, the Jags failed on their two-point conversion attempt, which led the Texans to their first win of the season.

==== Week 3: at Los Angeles Chargers ====
Week Three: Houston Texans at Los Angeles Chargers – Game summary

| Quarter | 1 | 2 | 3 | 4 | Total |
|---|---|---|---|---|---|
| **Texans** | 0 | 7 | 14 | 6 | **27** |
| Chargers | 7 | 10 | 0 | 3 | **20** |

at Dignity Health Sports Park, Carson, California

- Date: September 22
- Game time: 3:25 p.m. CDT/1:25 p.m. PDT
- Game weather: Partly cloudy, 87 °F (31 °C)
- Game attendance: 25,349
- Referee: Clay Martin
- TV announcers (CBS): Spero Dedes and Adam Archuleta
- Recap, Game Book

Game information

**First quarter**

- LAC – Keenan Allen 7-yard pass from Philip Rivers (Ty Long kick), 9:41. Chargers 7–0. **Drive: 3 plays, 15 yards, 1:28.**

**Second quarter**

- LAC – Ty Long 34-yard field goal, 10:32. Chargers 10–0. **Drive: 15 plays, 72 yards, 8:41.**
- HOU – Darren Fells 16-yard pass from Deshaun Watson (Kaʻimi Fairbairn kick), 8:11. Chargers 10–7. **Drive: 5 plays, 75 yards, 2:21.**
- LAC – Keenan Allen 12-yard pass from Philip Rivers (Ty Long kick), 0:22. Chargers 17–7. **Drive: 8 plays, 89 yards, 1:18.**

**Third quarter**

- HOU – Carlos Hyde 3-yard run (Kaʻimi Fairbairn kick), 7:31. Chargers 17–14. **Drive: 8 plays, 55 yards, 3:37.**
- HOU – Jordan Akins 15-yard pass from Deshaun Watson (Kaʻimi Fairbairn kick), 1:19. Texans 21–17. **Drive: 6 plays, 73 yards, 2:24.**

**Fourth quarter**

- HOU – Jordan Akins 53-yard pass from Deshaun Watson (kick failed, wide right), 9:40. Texans 27–17. **Drive: 7 plays, 82 yards, 3:48.**
- LAC – Ty Long 43-yard field goal, 7:14. Texans 27–20. **Drive: 6 plays, 50 yards, 2:26.**

**Top passers**

- HOU – Deshaun Watson – 25/34, 351 yards, 3 TD
- LAC – Philip Rivers – 31/46, 318 yards, 2 TD

**Top rushers**

- HOU – Carlos Hyde – 10 rushes, 19 yards, TD
- LAC – Austin Ekeler – 9 rushes, 36 yards

**Top receivers**

- HOU – Kenny Stills – 4 receptions, 89 yards
- LAC – Keenan Allen – 13 receptions, 183 yards, 2 TD

During the third quarter, quarterback Deshaun Watson made the 50th touchdown pass of his career on a 15-yarder to tight end Jordan Akins.

==== Week 4: vs. Carolina Panthers ====
Week Four: Carolina Panthers at Houston Texans – Game summary

| Quarter | 1 | 2 | 3 | 4 | Total |
|---|---|---|---|---|---|
| **Panthers** | 3 | 7 | 0 | 6 | **16** |
| Texans | 0 | 3 | 7 | 0 | **10** |

at NRG Stadium, Houston, Texas

- Date: September 29
- Game time: 12:00 p.m. CDT
- Game weather: None (retractable roof closed)
- Game attendance: 71,699
- Referee: Adrian Hill
- TV announcers (Fox): Kenny Albert, Ronde Barber and Lindsay Czarniak
- Recap, Game Book

Game information

**First quarter**

- CAR – Joey Slye 48-yard field goal, 2:23. Panthers 3–0. **Drive: 6 plays, 29 yards, 2:32.**

**Second quarter**

- HOU – Kaʻimi Fairbairn 37-yard field goal, 7:59. Tied 3–3. **Drive: 10 plays, 66 yards, 4:35.**
- CAR – Christian McCaffrey 3-yard run (Joey Slye kick), 1:08. Panthers 10–3. **Drive: 5 plays, 54 yards, 1:08.**

**Third quarter**

- HOU – Deshaun Watson 1-yard run (Kaʻimi Fairbairn kick), 8:39. Tied 10–10. **Drive: 4 plays, 18 yards, 1:48.**

**Fourth quarter**

- CAR – Joey Slye 55-yard field goal, 14:50. Panthers 13–10. **Drive: 9 plays, 42 yards, 3:50.**
- CAR – Joey Slye 26-yard field goal, 0:28. Panthers 16–10. **Drive: 7 plays, 25 yards, 3:37.**

**Top passers**

- CAR – Kyle Allen – 24/34, 232 yards
- HOU – Deshaun Watson – 21/33, 160 yards

**Top rushers**

- CAR – Christian McCaffrey – 27 rushes, 93 yards, TD
- HOU – Carlos Hyde – 12 rushes, 58 yards

**Top receivers**

- CAR – Christian McCaffrey – 10 receptions, 86 yards
- HOU – DeAndre Hopkins – 5 receptions, 41 yards

==== Week 5: vs. Atlanta Falcons ====
Week Five: Atlanta Falcons at Houston Texans – Game summary

| Quarter | 1 | 2 | 3 | 4 | Total |
|---|---|---|---|---|---|
| Falcons | 7 | 10 | 0 | 15 | **32** |
| **Texans** | 7 | 9 | 17 | 20 | **53** |

at NRG Stadium, Houston, Texas

- Date: October 6
- Game time: 12:00 p.m. CDT
- Game weather: None (retractable roof closed)
- Game attendance: 71,787
- Referee: Shawn Smith
- TV announcers (Fox): Kenny Albert, Ronde Barber and Sara Walsh
- Recap, Game Book

Game information

**First quarter**

- ATL – Mohamed Sanu 14-yard pass from Matt Ryan (Matt Bryant kick), 9:03. Falcons 7–0. **Drive: 6 plays, 66 yards, 2:35.**
- HOU – Will Fuller 6-yard pass from Deshaun Watson (Kaʻimi Fairbairn kick), 4:09. Tied 7–7. **Drive: 11 plays, 75 yards, 4:54.**

**Second quarter**

- ATL – Matt Bryant 35-yard field goal, 14:52. Falcons 10–7. **Drive: 10 plays, 57 yards, 4:17.**
- HOU – Will Fuller 33-yard pass from Deshaun Watson (kick failed, wide left), 12:06. Texans 13–10. **Drive: 6 plays, 60 yards, 2:46.**
- HOU – Kaʻimi Fairbairn 50-yard field goal, 4:02. Texans 16–10. **Drive: 10 plays, 60 yards, 5:08.**
- ATL – Devonta Freeman 9-yard pass from Matt Ryan (Matt Bryant kick), 0:22. Falcons 17–16. **Drive: 11 plays, 82 yards, 3:40.**

**Third quarter**

- HOU – Carlos Hyde 1-yard run (Kaʻimi Fairbairn kick), 11:51. Texans 23–17. **Drive: 7 plays, 75 yards, 3:09.**
- HOU – Kaʻimi Fairbairn 26-yard field goal, 7:37. Texans 26–17. **Drive: 7 plays, 59 yards, 2:29.**
- HOU – Darren Fells 8-yard pass from Deshaun Watson (Kaʻimi Fairbairn kick), 1:58. Texans 33–17. **Drive: 6 plays, 88 yards, 3:46.**

**Fourth quarter**

- ATL – Matt Ryan 1-yard run (Matt Ryan–Austin Hooper pass), 11:24. Texans 33–25. **Drive: 7 plays, 16 yards, 3:25.**
- HOU – Darren Fells 12-yard pass from Deshaun Watson (Kaʻimi Fairbairn kick), 6:24. Texans 40–25. **Drive: 9 plays, 81 yards, 5:00.**
- ATL – Calvin Ridley 29-yard pass from Matt Ryan (Matt Bryant kick), 3:22. Texans 40–32. **Drive: 8 plays, 75 yards, 3:02.**
- HOU – Will Fuller 44-yard pass from Deshaun Watson (Kaʻimi Fairbairn kick), 1:51. Texans 47–32. **Drive: 6 plays, 60 yards, 1:31.**
- HOU – Tashaun Gipson 79-yard interception return (kick failed, wide left), 0:24. Texans 53–32.

**Top passers**

- ATL – Matt Ryan – 32/46, 330 yards, 3 TD, INT
- HOU – Deshaun Watson – 28/33, 426 yards, 5 TD

**Top rushers**

- ATL – Devonta Freeman – 11 rushes, 30 yards
- HOU – Carlos Hyde – 21 rushes, 60 yards, TD

**Top receivers**

- ATL – Calvin Ridley – 5 receptions, 88 yards, TD
- HOU – Will Fuller – 14 receptions, 217 yards, 3 TD

Atlanta's defense struggled to contain Houston's offense, giving up 592 yards. Deshaun Watson passed for 426 yards with five touchdowns, only five incompletions, and no interceptions for a perfect passer rating.

==== Week 6: at Kansas City Chiefs ====
Week Six: Houston Texans at Kansas City Chiefs – Game summary

| Quarter | 1 | 2 | 3 | 4 | Total |
|---|---|---|---|---|---|
| **Texans** | 3 | 20 | 0 | 8 | **31** |
| Chiefs | 17 | 0 | 7 | 0 | **24** |

at Arrowhead Stadium, Kansas City, Missouri

- Date: October 13
- Game time: 12:00 p.m. CDT
- Game weather: Sunny, 56 °F (13 °C)
- Game attendance: 73,323
- Referee: Shawn Hochuli
- TV announcers (CBS): Ian Eagle, Dan Fouts and Evan Washburn
- Recap, Game Book

Game information

**First quarter**

- KC – Tyreek Hill 46-yard pass from Patrick Mahomes (Harrison Butker kick), 11:42. Chiefs 7–0. **Drive: 6 plays, 91 yards, 3:18.**
- KC – Harrison Butker 41-yard field goal, 10:19. Chiefs 10–0. **Drive: 4 plays, −5 yards, 1:17.**
- HOU – Kaʻimi Fairbairn 44-yard field goal, 5:46. Chiefs 10–3. **Drive: 12 plays, 49 yards, 4:33.**
- KC – Damien Williams 14-yard pass from Patrick Mahomes (Harrison Butker kick), 1:28. Chiefs 17–3. **Drive: 9 plays, 90 yards, 4:18.**

**Second quarter**

- HOU – Duke Johnson 11-yard pass from Deshaun Watson (kick failed, wide right), 12:15. Chiefs 17–9. **Drive: 10 plays, 75 yards, 4:13.**
- HOU – Carlos Hyde 2-yard run (Kaʻimi Fairbairn kick), 3:06. Chiefs 17–16. **Drive: 12 plays, 80 yards, 5:36.**
- HOU – Deshaun Watson 3-yard run (Kaʻimi Fairbairn kick), 0:16. Texans 23–17. **Drive: 1 play, 3 yards, 0:07.**

**Third quarter**

- KC – Tyreek Hill 6-yard pass from Patrick Mahomes (Harrison Butker kick), 6:30. Chiefs 24–23. **Drive: 10 plays, 64 yards, 4:25.**

**Fourth quarter**

- HOU – Deshaun Watson 1-yard run (Deshaun Watson–Hopkins pass), 6:17. Texans 31–24. **Drive: 12 plays, 93 yards, 8:32.**

**Top passers**

- HOU – Deshaun Watson – 30/42, 280 yards, TD, 2 INT
- KC – Patrick Mahomes – 19/35, 273 yards, 3 TD, INT

**Top rushers**

- HOU – Carlos Hyde – 26 rushes, 116 yards, TD
- KC – LeSean McCoy – 8 rushes, 44 yards

**Top receivers**

- HOU – Darren Fells – 6 receptions, 69 yards
- KC – Tyreek Hill – 5 receptions, 80 yards, 2 TD

This was assistant head coach Romeo Crennel's first visit to Kansas City in 7 years, where he served as their interim head coach for the final 3 Weeks of the 2011 season, most notably ending the Green Bay Packers' hopes of a perfect season that year, and was the Chiefs' head coach during the 2012 season. With the win, the Texans improved to 4-2.

==== Week 7: at Indianapolis Colts ====
Week Seven: Houston Texans at Indianapolis Colts – Game summary

| Quarter | 1 | 2 | 3 | 4 | Total |
|---|---|---|---|---|---|
| Texans | 0 | 9 | 7 | 7 | **23** |
| **Colts** | 7 | 7 | 14 | 2 | **30** |

at Lucas Oil Stadium, Indianapolis, Indiana

- Date: October 20
- Game time: 1:00 p.m. EDT/12:00 p.m. CDT
- Game weather: Sunny, 64 °F (18 °C) (roof open)
- Game attendance: 59,977
- Referee: Tony Corrente
- TV announcers (CBS): Greg Gumbel, Trent Green and Melanie Collins
- Recap, Game Book

Game information

**First quarter**

- IND – Zach Pascal 11-yard pass from Jacoby Brissett (Adam Vinatieri kick), 5:01. Colts 7–0. **Drive: 12 plays, 94 yards, 4:59.**

**Second quarter**

- HOU – Kaʻimi Fairbairn 47-yard field goal, 8:59. Colts 7–3. **Drive: 7 plays, 16 yards, 4:05.**
- HOU – Kaʻimi Fairbairn 31-yard field goal, 6:25. Colts 7–6. **Drive: 4 plays, −9 yards, 1:02.**
- IND – T. Y. Hilton 2-yard pass from Jacoby Brissett (Adam Vinatieri kick), 1:49. Colts 14–6. **Drive: 9 plays, 75 yards, 4:36.**
- HOU – Kaʻimi Fairbairn 26-yard field goal, 0:23. Colts 14–9. **Drive: 8 plays, 67 yards, 1:26.**

**Third quarter**

- IND – Eric Ebron 4-yard pass from Jacoby Brissett (Adam Vinatieri kick), 10:29. Colts 21–9. **Drive: 8 plays, 74 yards, 4:31.**
- HOU – Keke Coutee 4-yard run (Kaʻimi Fairbairn kick), 8:43. Colts 21–16. **Drive: 5 plays, 75 yards, 1:46.**
- IND – Zach Pascal 3-yard pass from Jacoby Brissett (Adam Vinatieri kick), 1:14. Colts 28–16. **Drive: 12 plays, 75 yards, 7:29.**

**Fourth quarter**

- HOU – DeAndre Hopkins 4-yard pass from Deshaun Watson (Kaʻimi Fairbairn kick), 6:38. Colts 28–23. **Drive: 6 plays, 79 yards, 2:03.**
- IND – Bryan Anger ran out of bounds in end zone, forced by Zach Pascal, for a safety 2:41. Colts 30–23.

**Top passers**

- HOU – Deshaun Watson – 23/34, 308 yards, TD, 2 INT
- IND – Jacoby Brissett – 26/39, 326 yards, 4 TD

**Top rushers**

- HOU – Carlos Hyde – 12 rushes, 35 yards
- IND – Marlon Mack – 18 rushes, 44 yards

**Top receivers**

- HOU – DeAndre Hopkins – 9 receptions, 106 yards, TD
- IND – Zach Pascal – 6 receptions, 106 yards, 2 TD

==== Week 8: vs. Oakland Raiders ====
Week Eight: Oakland Raiders at Houston Texans – Game summary

| Quarter | 1 | 2 | 3 | 4 | Total |
|---|---|---|---|---|---|
| Raiders | 7 | 7 | 7 | 3 | **24** |
| **Texans** | 7 | 3 | 3 | 14 | **27** |

at NRG Stadium, Houston, Texas

- Date: October 27
- Game time: 3:25 p.m. CDT
- Game weather: None (retractable roof closed)
- Game attendance: 71,893
- Referee: Craig Wrolstad
- TV announcers (CBS): Andrew Catalon, James Lofton and A.J. Ross
- Recap, Game Book

Game information

**First quarter**

- OAK – Hunter Renfrow 65-yard pass from Derek Carr (Daniel Carlson kick), 3:40. Raiders 7–0. **Drive: 8 plays, 95 yards, 3:31.**
- HOU – Duke Johnson 12-yard pass from Deshaun Watson (Kaʻimi Fairbairn kick), 1:39. Tied 7–7. **Drive: 6 plays, 75 yards, 2:01.**

**Second quarter**

- OAK – Darren Waller 8-yard pass from Derek Carr (Daniel Carlson kick), 9:36. Raiders 14–7. **Drive: 10 plays, 70 yards, 4:43.**
- HOU – Kaʻimi Fairbairn 33-yard field goal, 1:04. Raiders 14–10. **Drive: 11 plays, 64 yards, 3:38.**

**Third quarter**

- HOU – Kaʻimi Fairbairn 40-yard field goal, 10:28. Raiders 14–13. **Drive: 9 plays, 53 yards, 4:32.**
- OAK – Tyrell Williams 46-yard pass from Derek Carr (Daniel Carlson kick), 7:53. Raiders 21–13. **Drive: 6 plays, 77 yards, 2:35.**

**Fourth quarter**

- HOU – Darren Fells 4-yard pass from Deshaun Watson (Kaʻimi Fairbairn kick), 14:56. Raiders 21–20. **Drive: 15 plays, 77 yards, 7:57.**
- OAK – Daniel Carlson 44-yard field goal, 10:48. Raiders 24–20. **Drive: 9 plays, 50 yards, 4:08.**
- HOU – Darren Fells 9-yard pass from Deshaun Watson (Kaʻimi Fairbairn kick), 6:26. Texans 27–24. **Drive: 9 plays, 75 yards, 4:22.**

**Top passers**

- OAK – Derek Carr – 18/30, 285 yards, 3 TD
- HOU – Deshaun Watson – 27/39, 279 yards, 3 TD

**Top rushers**

- OAK – Josh Jacobs – 15 rushes, 66 yards
- HOU – Carlos Hyde – 19 rushes, 83 yards

**Top receivers**

- OAK – Tyrell Williams – 3 receptions, 91 yards, TD
- HOU – DeAndre Hopkins – 11 receptions, 109 yards

==== Week 9: at Jacksonville Jaguars ====
NFL London Games

Week Nine: Houston Texans at Jacksonville Jaguars – Game summary

| Quarter | 1 | 2 | 3 | 4 | Total |
|---|---|---|---|---|---|
| **Texans** | 3 | 6 | 10 | 7 | **26** |
| Jaguars | 0 | 3 | 0 | 0 | **3** |

at Wembley Stadium, London, England

- Date: November 3
- Game time: 2:30 p.m. GMT/8:30 a.m. CST
- Game weather: Cloudy, 53 °F (12 °C)
- Game attendance: 84,771
- Referee: Clete Blakeman
- TV announcers (NFLN): Rich Eisen, Kurt Warner, Steve Mariucci, Michael Irvin and Melissa Stark
- Recap, Game Book

Game information

**First quarter**

- HOU – Kaʻimi Fairbairn 52-yard field goal, 8:20. Texans 3–0. **Drive: 13 plays, 47 yards, 6:40.**

**Second quarter**

- HOU – Darren Fells 1-yard pass from Deshaun Watson (kick blocked), 5:55. Texans 9–0. **Drive: 14 plays, 80 yards, 8:14.**
- JAX – Josh Lambo 30-yard field goal, 1:48. Texans 9–3. **Drive: 11 plays, 63 yards, 4:07.**

**Third quarter**

- HOU – Kaʻimi Fairbairn 42-yard field goal, 4:57. Texans 12–3. **Drive: 7 plays, 26 yards, 3:59.**
- HOU – Duke Johnson 1-yard run (Kaʻimi Fairbairn kick), 0:31. Texans 19–3. **Drive: 5 plays, 79 yards, 2:19.**

**Fourth quarter**

- HOU – DeAndre Hopkins 1-yard pass from Deshaun Watson (Kaʻimi Fairbairn kick), 4:19. Texans 26–3. **Drive: 2 plays, 3 yards, 0:10.**

**Top passers**

- HOU – Deshaun Watson – 22/28, 201 yards, 2 TD
- JAX – Gardner Minshew – 27/47, 309 yards, 2 INT

**Top rushers**

- HOU – Carlos Hyde – 19 carries, 160 yards
- JAX – Leonard Fournette – 11 carries, 40 yards

**Top receivers**

- HOU – Duke Johnson – 5 receptions, 68 yards
- JAX – Keelan Cole – 5 receptions, 80 yards

==== Week 11: at Baltimore Ravens ====
Week Eleven: Houston Texans at Baltimore Ravens – Game summary

| Quarter | 1 | 2 | 3 | 4 | Total |
|---|---|---|---|---|---|
| Texans | 0 | 0 | 0 | 7 | **7** |
| **Ravens** | 0 | 14 | 13 | 14 | **41** |

at M&T Bank Stadium, Baltimore, Maryland

- Date: November 17
- Game time: 1:00 p.m. EST/12:00 p.m. CST
- Game weather: Cloudy, 44 °F (7 °C)
- Game attendance: 70,731
- Referee: Alex Kemp
- TV announcers (CBS): Ian Eagle, Dan Fouts and Evan Washburn
- Recap, Game Book

Game information

**First quarter**

- No scoring plays.

**Second quarter**

- BAL – Seth Roberts 15-yard pass from Lamar Jackson (Justin Tucker kick), 9:17. Ravens 7–0. **Drive: 10 plays, 90 yards, 5:46.**
- BAL – Mark Andrews 18-yard pass from Lamar Jackson (Justin Tucker kick), 2:14. Ravens 14–0. **Drive: 7 plays, 70 yards, 4:22.**

**Third quarter**

- BAL – Mark Ingram II 25-yard pass from Lamar Jackson (Justin Tucker kick), 11:33. Ravens 21–0. **Drive: 6 plays, 78 yards, 3:27.**
- BAL – Justin Tucker 34-yard field goal, 6:52. Ravens 24–0. **Drive: 6 plays, 52 yards, 2:49.**
- BAL – Justin Tucker 46-yard field goal, 1:30. Ravens 27–0. **Drive: 6 plays, 11 yards, 3:14.**

**Fourth quarter**

- BAL – Mark Ingram II 12-yard pass from Lamar Jackson (Justin Tucker kick), 9:50. Ravens 34–0. **Drive: 8 plays, 71 yards, 4:52.**
- HOU – Carlos Hyde 41-yard run (Kaʻimi Fairbairn kick), 7:10. Ravens 34–7. **Drive: 5 plays, 77 yards, 2:40.**
- BAL – Gus Edwards 63-yard run (Justin Tucker kick), 4:01. Ravens 41–7. **Drive: 5 plays, 87 yards, 3:09.**

**Top passers**

- HOU – Deshaun Watson – 18/29, 169 yards, INT
- BAL – Lamar Jackson – 17/24, 222 yards, 4 TD

**Top rushers**

- HOU – Carlos Hyde – 9 rushes, 65 yards, TD
- BAL – Gus Edwards – 8 rushes, 112 yards, TD

**Top receivers**

- HOU – DeAndre Hopkins – 7 receptions, 80 yards
- BAL – Mark Andrews – 4 receptions, 75 yards, TD

==== Week 12: vs. Indianapolis Colts ====
Week Twelve: Indianapolis Colts at Houston Texans – Game summary

| Quarter | 1 | 2 | 3 | 4 | Total |
|---|---|---|---|---|---|
| Colts | 0 | 10 | 7 | 0 | **17** |
| **Texans** | 0 | 10 | 3 | 7 | **20** |

at NRG Stadium, Houston, Texas

- Date: November 21
- Game time: 7:20 p.m. CST
- Game weather: None (retractable roof closed)
- Game attendance: 71,727
- Referee: Ronald Torbert
- TV announcers (Fox/NFLN/Amazon Prime): Joe Buck, Troy Aikman, Erin Andrews and Kristina Pink
- Recap, Game Book

Game information

**First quarter**

- No scoring plays.

**Second quarter**

- HOU – Kaʻimi Fairbairn 35-yard field goal, 13:42. Texans 3–0. **Drive: 10 plays, 37 yards, 4:30.**
- IND – Jacoby Brissett 5-yard run (Adam Vinatieri kick), 4:28. Colts 7–3. **Drive: 7 plays, 42 yards, 3:27.**
- HOU – DeAndre Hopkins 35-yard pass from Deshaun Watson (Kaʻimi Fairbairn kick), 1:53. Texans 10–7. **Drive: 7 plays, 75 yards, 2:35.**
- IND – Adam Vinatieri 36-yard field goal, 0:00. Tied 10–10. **Drive: 10 plays, 58 yards, 1:53.**

**Third quarter**

- IND – Jonathan Williams 13-yard run (Adam Vinatieri kick), 5:36. Colts 17–10. **Drive: 11 plays, 66 yards, 6:09.**
- HOU – Kaʻimi Fairbairn 36-yard field goal, 2:43. Colts 17–13. **Drive: 5 plays, 57 yards, 2:53.**

**Fourth quarter**

- HOU – DeAndre Hopkins 30-yard pass from Deshaun Watson (Kaʻimi Fairbairn kick), 12:34. Texans 20–17. **Drive: 8 plays, 86 yards, 3:37.**

**Top passers**

- IND – Jacoby Brissett – 16/25, 129 yards
- HOU – Deshaun Watson – 19/30, 298 yards, 2 TD, INT

**Top rushers**

- IND – Jonathan Williams – 26 rushes, 104 yards, TD
- HOU – Carlos Hyde – 16 rushes, 67 yards

**Top receivers**

- IND – Eric Ebron – 4 receptions, 44 yards
- HOU – Will Fuller – 7 receptions, 140 yards

==== Week 13: vs. New England Patriots ====
Week Thirteen: New England Patriots at Houston Texans – Game summary

| Quarter | 1 | 2 | 3 | 4 | Total |
|---|---|---|---|---|---|
| Patriots | 3 | 0 | 6 | 13 | **22** |
| **Texans** | 7 | 7 | 7 | 7 | **28** |

at NRG Stadium, Houston, Texas

- Date: December 1
- Game time: 7:20 p.m. CST
- Game weather: None (retractable roof closed)
- Game attendance: 72,025
- Referee: Tony Corrente
- TV announcers (NBC): Al Michaels, Cris Collinsworth and Michele Tafoya
- Recap, Game Book

Game information

**First quarter**

- NE – Kai Forbath 23-yard field goal, 7:04. Patriots 3–0. **Drive: 14 plays, 69 yards, 7:01.**
- HOU – Duke Johnson 14-yard pass from Deshaun Watson (Kaʻimi Fairbairn kick), 0:38. Texans 7–3. **Drive: 3 plays, 21 yards, 1:20.**

**Second quarter**

- HOU – Darren Fells 13-yard pass from Deshaun Watson (Kaʻimi Fairbairn kick), 6:21. Texans 14–3. **Drive: 13 plays, 88 yards, 6:52.**

**Third quarter**

- HOU – Kenny Stills 35-yard pass from Deshaun Watson (Kaʻimi Fairbairn kick), 5:41. Texans 21–3. **Drive: 6 plays, 58 yards, 1:27.**
- NE – James White 12-yard pass from Tom Brady (kick failed), 0:11. Texans 21–9. **Drive: 12 plays, 75 yards, 5:30.**

**Fourth quarter**

- HOU – Deshaun Watson 6-yard pass from DeAndre Hopkins (Kaʻimi Fairbairn kick), 9:53. Texans 28–9. **Drive: 9 plays, 75 yards, 5:18.**
- NE – James White 11-yard pass from Tom Brady (pass failed), 3:42. Texans 28–15. **Drive: 13 plays, 75 yards, 6:11.**
- NE – Julian Edelman 20-yard pass from Tom Brady (Kai Forbath kick), 0:50. Texans 28–22. **Drive: 6 plays, 94 yards, 1:46.**

**Top passers**

- NE – Tom Brady – 24/47, 326 yards, 3 TD, INT
- HOU – Deshaun Watson – 18/25, 234 yards, 3 TD

**Top rushers**

- NE – James White – 14 carries, 79 yards
- HOU – Duke Johnson – 9 carries, 36 yards

**Top receivers**

- NE – Julian Edelman – 6 receptions, 106 yards, TD
- HOU – DeAndre Hopkins – 5 receptions, 64 yards

The win snapped the Texans' eight-game losing streak to the Patriots, beating them for the first time since the 2009 season.

==== Week 14: vs. Denver Broncos ====
Battle Red Day

Week Fourteen: Denver Broncos at Houston Texans – Game summary

| Quarter | 1 | 2 | 3 | 4 | Total |
|---|---|---|---|---|---|
| **Broncos** | 14 | 17 | 7 | 0 | **38** |
| Texans | 0 | 3 | 7 | 14 | **24** |

at NRG Stadium, Houston, Texas

- Date: December 8
- Game time: 12:00 p.m. CST
- Game weather: None (retractable roof closed)
- Game attendance: 71,769
- Referee: Adrian Hill
- TV announcers (CBS): Kevin Harlan, Rich Gannon and AJ Ross
- Recap, Game Book

Game information

**First quarter**

- DEN – Noah Fant 14-yard pass from Drew Lock (Brandon McManus kick), 7:27. Broncos 7–0. **Drive: 7 plays, 92 yards, 2:59.**
- DEN – Kareem Jackson 70-yard fumble return (Brandon McManus kick), 3:33. Broncos 14–0.

**Second quarter**

- DEN – Jeff Heuerman 8-yard pass from Drew Lock (Brandon McManus kick), 11:24. Broncos 21–0. **Drive: 8 plays, 80 yards, 4:04.**
- HOU – Kaʻimi Fairbairn 54-yard field goal, 8:49. Broncos 21–3. **Drive: 8 plays, 39 yards, 2:35.**
- DEN – Brandon McManus 36-yard field goal, 3:04. Broncos 24–3. **Drive: 9 plays, 57 yards, 5:45.**
- DEN – Royce Freeman 3-yard pass from Drew Lock (Brandon McManus kick), 0:37. Broncos 31–3. **Drive: 6 plays, 34 yards, 1:19.**

**Third quarter**

- DEN – Philip Lindsay 1-yard run (Brandon McManus kick), 9:15. Broncos 38–3. **Drive: 8 plays, 57 yards, 5:45.**
- HOU – DeAndre Hopkins 43-yard pass from Deshaun Watson (Kaʻimi Fairbairn kick), 7:36. Broncos 38–10. **Drive: 4 plays, 70 yards, 1:39.**

**Fourth quarter**

- HOU – Deshaun Watson 6-yard run (Kaʻimi Fairbairn kick), 13:34. Broncos 38–17. **Drive: 12 plays, 71 yards, 4:03.**
- HOU – Deshaun Watson 3-yard run (Kaʻimi Fairbairn kick), 0:25. Broncos 38–24. **Drive: 14 plays, 79 yards, 3:27.**

**Top passers**

- DEN – Drew Lock – 22/27, 309 yards, 3 TD, INT
- HOU – Deshaun Watson – 28/50, 292 yards, TD, 2 INT

**Top rushers**

- DEN – Phillip Lindsay – 16 rushes, 51 yards, TD
- HOU – Carlos Hyde – 14 rushes, 73 yards

**Top receivers**

- DEN – Noah Fant – 4 receptions, 113 yards, TD
- HOU – DeAndre Hopkins – 7 receptions, 120 yards, TD

==== Week 15: at Tennessee Titans ====
Week Fifteen: Houston Texans at Tennessee Titans – Game summary

| Quarter | 1 | 2 | 3 | 4 | Total |
|---|---|---|---|---|---|
| **Texans** | 0 | 14 | 0 | 10 | **24** |
| Titans | 0 | 0 | 7 | 14 | **21** |

at Nissan Stadium, Nashville, Tennessee

- Date: December 15
- Game time: 12:00 p.m. CST
- Game weather: Cloudy, 45 °F (7 °C)
- Game attendance: 65,265
- Referee: Bill Vinovich
- TV announcers (CBS): Jim Nantz, Tony Romo and Tracy Wolfson
- Recap, Game Book

Game information

**First quarter**

- No scoring plays

**Second quarter**

- HOU – Kenny Stills 12-yard pass from Deshaun Watson (Kaʻimi Fairbairn kick), 9:59. Texans 7–0. **Drive: 2 plays, 12 yards, 0:47.**
- HOU – Kenny Stills 16-yard pass from Deshaun Watson (Kaʻimi Fairbairn kick), 3:14. Texans 14–0. **Drive: 9 plays, 72 yards, 4:35.**

**Third quarter**

- TEN – Ryan Tannehill 1-yard run (Ryan Succop kick), 5:34. Texans 14–7. **Drive: 15 plays, 76 yards, 9:26.**

**Fourth quarter**

- TEN – A. J. Brown 5-yard pass from Ryan Tannehill (Ryan Succop kick), 13:35. Tied 14–14. **Drive: 6 plays, 80 yards, 2:04.**
- HOU – Carlos Hyde 10-yard run (Kaʻimi Fairbairn kick), 10:34. Texans 21–14. **Drive: 7 plays, 75 yards, 3:01.**
- HOU – Kaʻimi Fairbairn 29-yard field goal, 3:26. Texans 24–14. **Drive: 12 plays, 80 yards, 5:20.**
- TEN – Dion Lewis 11-yard pass from Ryan Tannehill (Ryan Succop kick), 2:04. Texans 24–21. **Drive: 7 plays, 75 yards, 1:22.**

**Top passers**

- HOU – Deshaun Watson – 19/27, 243 yards, 2 TD, 2 INT
- TEN – Ryan Tannehill – 22/36, 279 yards, 2 TD, INT

**Top rushers**

- HOU – Carlos Hyde – 26 carries, 104 yards, TD
- TEN – Derrick Henry – 21 carries, 86 yards

**Top receivers**

- HOU – DeAndre Hopkins – 6 receptions, 119 yards
- TEN – A. J. Brown – 8 receptions, 114 yards, TD

==== Week 16: at Tampa Bay Buccaneers ====
Week Sixteen: Houston Texans at Tampa Bay Buccaneers – Game summary

| Quarter | 1 | 2 | 3 | 4 | Total |
|---|---|---|---|---|---|
| **Texans** | 10 | 7 | 3 | 3 | **23** |
| Buccaneers | 3 | 14 | 3 | 0 | **20** |

at Raymond James Stadium, Tampa, Florida

- Date: December 21
- Game time: 1:00 p.m. EST/12:00 p.m. CST
- Game weather: Cloudy, 73 °F (23 °C)
- Game attendance: 49,036
- Referee: Scott Novak
- TV announcers (NFLN/KRIV): Rich Eisen, Nate Burleson, Joe Thomas and Melissa Stark
- Recap, Game Book

Game information

**First quarter**

- HOU – Bradley Roby 27-yard interception return (Kaʻimi Fairbairn kick), 14:12. Texans 7–0.
- HOU – Kaʻimi Fairbairn 32-yard field goal, 11:29. Texans 10–0. **Drive: 6 plays. 10 yards, 1:40.**
- TB – Matt Gay 50-yard field goal, 0:56. Texans 10–3. **Drive: 9 plays, 58 yards, 3:42.**

**Second quarter**

- HOU – Carlos Hyde 1-yard run (Kaʻimi Fairbairn kick), 9:22. Texans 17–3. **Drive: 7 plays, 42 yards, 2:54.**
- TB – Ronald Jones 4-yard run (Matt Gay kick), 1:57. Texans 17–10. **Drive: 9 plays, 81 yards, 3:16.**
- TB – Justin Watson 8-yard pass from Jameis Winston (Matt Gay kick), 0:13. Tied 17–17. **Drive: 5 plays, 39 yards, 0:29.**

**Third quarter**

- HOU – Kaʻimi Fairbairn 25-yard field goal, 9:30. Texans 20–17. **Drive: 14 plays, 68 yards, 5:30.**
- TB – Matt Gay 41-yard field goal, 1:13. Tied 20–20. **Drive: 16 plays, 57 yards, 8:17.**

**Fourth quarter**

- HOU – Kaʻimi Fairbairn 37-yard field goal, 7:11. Texans 23–20. **Drive: 10 plays, 69 yards, 4:50.**

**Top passers**

- HOU – Deshaun Watson – 19/32, 184 yards, INT
- TB – Jameis Winston – 25/48, 335 yards, TD, 4 INT

**Top rushers**

- HOU – Deshaun Watson – 7 rushes, 37 yards
- TB – Ronald Jones – 14 rushes, 77 yards, TD

**Top receivers**

- HOU – Kenny Stills – 5 receptions, 57 yards
- TB – Breshad Perriman – 7 receptions, 102 yards

==== Week 17: vs. Tennessee Titans ====
Week Seventeen: Tennessee Titans at Houston Texans – Game summary

| Quarter | 1 | 2 | 3 | 4 | Total |
|---|---|---|---|---|---|
| **Titans** | 7 | 7 | 7 | 14 | **35** |
| Texans | 7 | 0 | 7 | 0 | **14** |

at NRG Stadium, Houston, Texas

- Date: December 29
- Game time: 3:25 p.m. CST
- Game weather: None (retractable roof closed)
- Game attendance: 71,794
- Referee: Clete Blakeman
- TV announcers (CBS): Jim Nantz, Tony Romo and Tracy Wolfson
- Recap, Game Book

Game information

**First quarter**

- HOU – Duke Johnson 1-yard run (Kaʻimi Fairbairn kick), 7:25. Texans 7–0. **Drive: 15 plays, 75 yards, 7:35.**
- TEN – A. J. Brown 51-yard pass from Ryan Tannehill (Greg Joseph kick), 5:33. Tied 7–7. **Drive: 4 plays, 75 yards, 1:52.**

**Second quarter**

- TEN – MyCole Pruitt 1-yard pass from Ryan Tannehill (Greg Joseph kick), 9:42. Titans 14–7. **Drive: 16 plays, 90 yards, 8:04.**

**Third quarter**

- TEN – Derrick Henry 3-yard run (Greg Joseph kick), 10:06. Titans 21–7. **Drive: 10 plays, 78 yards, 4:54.**
- HOU – A. J. McCarron 1-yard run (Kaʻimi Fairbairn kick), 1:09. Titans 21–14. **Drive: 16 plays, 75 yards, 8:57.**

**Fourth quarter**

- TEN – Derrick Henry 1-yard run (Greg Joseph kick), 14:02. Titans 28–14. **Drive: 5 plays, 75 yards, 2:04.**
- TEN – Derrick Henry 53-yard run (Greg Joseph kick), 2:54. Titans 35–14. **Drive: 4 plays, 85 yards, 0:32.**

**Top passers**

- TEN – Ryan Tannehill – 13/20, 198 yards, 2 TD
- HOU – A. J. McCarron – 21/36, 225 yards, INT

**Top rushers**

- TEN – Derrick Henry – 32 rushes, 211 yards, 3 TD
- HOU – Taiwan Jones – 9 rushes, 40 yards

**Top receivers**

- TEN – A. J. Brown – 4 receptions, 124 yards, TD
- HOU – DeAndre Carter – 6 receptions, 65 yards

With the Kansas City Chiefs defeating the Los Angeles Chargers earlier in the afternoon, the Texans were locked in at the 4th seed for the playoffs. Houston rested several offensive and defensive starters with A. J. McCarron starting at quarterback, his first start since 2015 when he played for the Cincinnati Bengals.

=== Standings ===
==== Division ====
AFC South
| | W | L | T | PCT | DIV | CONF | PF | PA | STK |
|---|---|---|---|---|---|---|---|---|---|
| ^{(4)} Houston Texans | 10 | 6 | 0 | .625 | 4–2 | 8–4 | 378 | 385 | L1 |
| ^{(6)} Tennessee Titans | 9 | 7 | 0 | .563 | 3–3 | 7–5 | 402 | 331 | W1 |
| Indianapolis Colts | 7 | 9 | 0 | .438 | 3–3 | 5–7 | 361 | 373 | L1 |
| Jacksonville Jaguars | 6 | 10 | 0 | .375 | 2–4 | 6–6 | 300 | 397 | W1 |

==== Conference ====
AFC
| # | Team | Division | W | L | T | PCT | DIV | CONF | SOS | SOV | STK |
|---|---|---|---|---|---|---|---|---|---|---|---|
**Division leaders**
| 1 | Baltimore Ravens | North | 14 | 2 | 0 | .875 | 5–1 | 10–2 | .494 | .484 | W12 |
| 2 (Note: Kansas City claimed the No. 2 seed over New England based on head-to-head victory.) | Kansas City Chiefs | West | 12 | 4 | 0 | .750 | 6–0 | 9–3 | .510 | .477 | W6 |
| 3 | New England Patriots | East | 12 | 4 | 0 | .750 | 5–1 | 8–4 | .469 | .411 | L1 |
| 4 | Houston Texans | South | 10 | 6 | 0 | .625 | 4–2 | 8–4 | .520 | .488 | L1 |
**Wild Cards**
| 5 | Buffalo Bills | East | 10 | 6 | 0 | .625 | 3–3 | 7–5 | .461 | .363 | L2 |
| 6 | Tennessee Titans | South | 9 | 7 | 0 | .563 | 3–3 | 7–5 | .488 | .465 | W1 |
**Did not qualify for the postseason**
| 7 | Pittsburgh Steelers | North | 8 | 8 | 0 | .500 | 3–3 | 6–6 | .502 | .324 | L3 |
| 8 (Note: Denver finished ahead of Indianapolis and NY Jets based on conference record. Division tiebreak was initially used to eliminate Oakland (see below).) (Note: Denver finished ahead of Oakland based on conference record.) | Denver Broncos | West | 7 | 9 | 0 | .438 | 3–3 | 6–6 | .510 | .406 | W2 |
| 9 (Note: Oakland and Indianapolis finished ahead of NY Jets based on conference record.) (Note: Oakland finished ahead of Indianapolis based on head-to-head victory.) | Oakland Raiders | West | 7 | 9 | 0 | .438 | 3–3 | 5–7 | .482 | .335 | L1 |
| 10 | Indianapolis Colts | South | 7 | 9 | 0 | .438 | 3–3 | 5–7 | .492 | .500 | L1 |
| 11 | New York Jets | East | 7 | 9 | 0 | .438 | 2–4 | 4–8 | .473 | .402 | W2 |
| 12 (Note: Jacksonville finished ahead of Cleveland based on record against common opponents. Jacksonville's cumulative record against Cincinnati, Denver, NY Jets, and Tennessee was 4–1, compared to Cleveland's 2–3 cumulative record against the same four teams.) | Jacksonville Jaguars | South | 6 | 10 | 0 | .375 | 2–4 | 6–6 | .484 | .406 | W1 |
| 13 | Cleveland Browns | North | 6 | 10 | 0 | .375 | 3–3 | 6–6 | .533 | .479 | L3 |
| 14 (Note: LA Chargers finished ahead of Miami based on head-to-head victory.) | Los Angeles Chargers | West | 5 | 11 | 0 | .313 | 0–6 | 3–9 | .514 | .488 | L3 |
| 15 | Miami Dolphins | East | 5 | 11 | 0 | .313 | 2–4 | 4–8 | .484 | .463 | W2 |
| 16 | Cincinnati Bengals | North | 2 | 14 | 0 | .125 | 1–5 | 2–10 | .553 | .406 | W1 |
**Tiebreakers** (Note: When breaking ties for three or more teams under the NFL's rules, they are first broken within divisions, then comparing only the highest ranked remaining team from each division.)

== Postseason ==
=== Schedule ===
| Round | Date | Opponent (seed) | Result | Record | Venue | Recap |
|---|---|---|---|---|---|---|
| Wild Card | January 4, 2020 | Buffalo Bills (5) | W 22–19 (OT) | 1–0 | NRG Stadium | Recap |
| Divisional | January 12, 2020 | at Kansas City Chiefs (2) | L 31–51 | 1–1 | Arrowhead Stadium | Recap |

=== Game summaries ===
==== AFC Wild Card Playoffs: vs. (5) Buffalo Bills ====
AFC Wild Card Playoffs: (5) Buffalo Bills at (4) Houston Texans – Game summary

| Quarter | 1 | 2 | 3 | 4 | OT | Total |
|---|---|---|---|---|---|---|
| Bills | 7 | 6 | 3 | 3 | 0 | 19 |
| Texans | 0 | 0 | 8 | 11 | 3 | 22 |

at NRG Stadium, Houston, Texas

- Date: January 4, 2020
- Game time: 3:35 p.m. CST
- Game weather: None (retractable roof closed)
- Game attendance: 71,699
- Referee: Tony Corrente
- TV announcers (ESPN/ABC): Joe Tessitore, Booger McFarland and Lisa Salters
- Recap, Game Book

Game information

First quarter

- BUF – Josh Allen 16-yard pass from John Brown (Stephen Hauschka kick), 11:41. Bills 7–0. Drive: 6 plays, 75 yards, 3:19.

Second quarter

- BUF – Stephen Hauschka 40-yard field goal, 10:47. Bills 10–0. Drive: 11 plays, 69 yards, 4:45.
- BUF – Stephen Hauschka 40-yard field goal, 0:04. Bills 13–0. Drive: 15 plays, 74 yards, 5:41.

Third quarter

- BUF – Stephen Hauschka 38-yard field goal, 6:02. Bills 16–0. Drive: 8 plays, 18 yards, 3:57.
- HOU – Deshaun Watson 20-yard run (Watson run), 1:33. Bills 16–8. Drive: 9 plays, 75 yards, 4:29.

Fourth quarter

- HOU – Kaʻimi Fairbairn 41-yard field goal, 10:55. Bills 16–11. Drive: 6 plays, 27 yards, 3:16.
- HOU – Carlos Hyde 5-yard pass from Deshaun Watson (Watson pass to Hopkins), 4:37. Texans 19–16. Drive: 8 plays, 74 yards, 4:52.
- BUF – Stephen Hauschka 47-yard field goal, 0:05. Tied 19–19. Drive: 11 plays, 41 yards, 1:11.

Overtime

- HOU – Kaʻimi Fairbairn 28-yard field goal, 3:20. Texans 22–19. Drive: 9 plays, 73 yards, 5:42.

Top passers

- BUF – Josh Allen – 24/46, 264 yards
- HOU – Deshaun Watson – 20/25, 247 yards, TD

Top rushers

- BUF – Josh Allen – 9 rushes, 92 yards
- HOU – Deshaun Watson – 14 rushes, 55 yards, TD

Top receivers

- BUF – Devin Singletary – 6 receptions, 76 yards
- HOU – DeAndre Hopkins – 6 receptions, 90 yards

Houston rallied back from a 16–0 3rd quarter deficit – having been held to 62 total yards in the first half – to win with 3:20 remaining in overtime on Kaʻimi Fairbairn's 28-yard field goal, for Buffalo's 6th consecutive playoff loss since their last win in December 1995.

On the opening drive of the game, Bills quarterback Josh Allen rushed for 42 yards – the Bills' longest rush of the season – and then caught a 16-yard touchdown pass from receiver John Brown on a trick play to put Buffalo up 7–0. In the second quarter, Devin Singletary rushed for an 18-yard gain and Allen completed a 28-yard pass to Brown as the team drove 69 yards in 11 plays to go up 10–0 on Stephen Hauschka's 40-yard field goal. Then after a punt, Buffalo drove 74 yards in 15 plays to score on a second 40-yard field goal from Hauschka, giving them a 13–0 lead at half-time.

Five minutes into the third quarter, Texans receiver DeAndre Hopkins fumbled the ball while being tackled by Tre'Davious White, and Tremaine Edmunds recovered it on the Texans' 38-yard line. Buffalo then drove to the 12-yard line, but ended up settling for Hauschka's third field goal after Allen was sacked on third down by J. J. Watt, giving them a 16–0 lead. This time, Houston managed to respond, moving the ball 75 yards in 9 plays and scoring on a 20-yard touchdown run from quarterback Deshaun Watson; Watson also scored the ensuing 2-point conversion to make the score 16–8. On the Bills' ensuing drive, linebacker Whitney Mercilus forced a fumble while sacking Allen, which Jacob Martin recovered for the Texans at midfield with 14:18 remaining. Watson then completed a 20-yard pass to Kenny Stills that set up Fairbairn's 41-yard field goal, cutting the score to 16–11.

After Buffalo punted on their next drive, Watson completed a 41-yard pass – on the drive's second play – to Hopkins on the Buffalo 28-yard line, and later connected with tight end Darren Fells for 14 yards to bring up first and goal from the 1-yard line. Running back Carlos Hyde fumbled a pitch from Watson and was forced out of bounds for a 4-yard loss, before catching a 5-yard touchdown pass from Watson on the next play. Hopkins caught Watson's pass for a 2-point conversion, giving Houston their first lead at 19–16 with 4:42 remaining. Buffalo started out their next drive with a 38-yard completion from Allen to Singletary, and soon found themselves with a first down on the Texans' 25-yard line. After an incompletion, Frank Gore was dropped by Mike Adams for a 3-yard loss and then Allen was flagged for intentional grounding, pushing the team all the way back to the 42-yard line. Allen was sacked for a 19-yard loss by Martin on 4th-and-27, with a turnover on downs putting the Texans at Buffalo's 39-yard line with less than two minutes remaining. The Bills' defense managed to pin the Texans down, with Watson being stopped short by Star Lotulelei on 4th-and-1. Gaining the ball with 1:16 left, Allen led Buffalo 41 yards in 11 plays, including a 20-yard run by Allen, to score on Hauschka's 47-yard field goal, sending the game to overtime at 19–19.

After both teams punted on their first drive of overtime – Buffalo having punted after a penalty pushed the team out of field goal range – Houston drove 73 yards in 9 plays for the game-winning score; the key play of the drive was an 18-yard completion from Watson to running back Duke Johnson on 3rd-and-18 from the Texans' 19-yard line. Then Watson rushed for 5 yards, Stills caught a pass for 10 yards, and Hyde rushed 4 yards to the Bills' 44-yard line. On the next play, Watson evaded a sack attempt by two Buffalo defenders and fired a short pass to reserve running back Taiwan Jones, who took off for a 34-yard gain to Buffalo's 10-yard line. Fairbairn then kicked a 28-yard field goal to give Houston the victory.

The Texans were the only home team to win during the Wild Card round.

==== AFC Divisional Playoffs: at (2) Kansas City Chiefs ====
AFC Divisional Playoffs: (4) Houston Texans at (2) Kansas City Chiefs – Game summary

| Quarter | 1 | 2 | 3 | 4 | Total |
|---|---|---|---|---|---|
| Texans | 21 | 3 | 7 | 0 | 31 |
| Chiefs | 0 | 28 | 13 | 10 | 51 |

at Arrowhead Stadium, Kansas City, Missouri

- Date: January 12, 2020
- Game time: 2:05 p.m. CST
- Game weather: Cloudy, 29 °F (−2 °C)
- Game attendance: 73,503
- Referee: Shawn Hochuli
- TV announcers (CBS): Jim Nantz, Tony Romo, Tracy Wolfson, Jay Feely and Gene Steratore
- Recap, Game Book

Game information

First quarter

- HOU – Kenny Stills 54-yard pass from Deshaun Watson (Kaʻimi Fairbairn kick), 11:59. Texans 7–0. Drive: 6 plays, 75 yards, 3:01.
- HOU – Lonnie Johnson Jr. 10-yard return of blocked punt (Kaʻimi Fairbairn kick), 10:06. Texans 14–0.
- HOU – Darren Fells 4-yard pass from Deshaun Watson (Kaʻimi Fairbairn kick), 1:21. Texans 21–0. Drive: 2 plays, 6 yards, 0:48.

Second quarter

- HOU – Kaʻimi Fairbairn 31-yard field goal, 10:54. Texans 24–0. Drive: 9 plays, 38 yards, 4:55.
- KC – Damien Williams 17-yard pass from Patrick Mahomes (Harrison Butker kick), 9:55. Texans 24–7. Drive: 2 plays, 42 yards, 0:59.
- KC – Travis Kelce 5-yard pass from Patrick Mahomes (Harrison Butker kick), 8:05. Texans 24–14. Drive: 3 plays, 33 yards, 0:23.
- KC – Travis Kelce 6-yard pass from Patrick Mahomes (Harrison Butker kick), 6:31. Texans 24–21. Drive: 3 plays, 6 yards, 1:25.
- KC – Travis Kelce 5-yard pass from Patrick Mahomes (Harrison Butker kick), 0:44. Chiefs 28–24. Drive: 8 plays, 90 yards, 2:03.

Third quarter

- KC – Damien Williams 1-yard run (kick failed, wide left), 11:24. Chiefs 34–24. Drive: 7 plays, 85 yards, 3:36.
- KC – Damien Williams 5-yard run (Harrison Butker kick), 4:39. Chiefs 41–24. Drive: 6 plays, 77 yards, 3:55.
- HOU – Deshaun Watson 5-yard run (Kaʻimi Fairbairn kick), 0:24. Chiefs 41–31. Drive: 9 plays, 75 yards, 4:15.

Fourth quarter

- KC – Blake Bell 8-yard pass from Patrick Mahomes (Harrison Butker kick), 13:52. Chiefs 48–31. Drive: 4 plays, 72 yards, 1:32.
- KC – Harrison Butker 24-yard field goal, 8:06. Chiefs 51–31. Drive: 7 plays, 52 yards, 3:31.

Top passers

- HOU – Deshaun Watson – 31/52, 388 yards, 2 TD
- KC – Patrick Mahomes – 23/35, 321 yards, 5 TD

Top rushers

- HOU – Carlos Hyde – 13 rushes, 44 yards
- KC – Patrick Mahomes – 7 rushes, 53 yards

Top receivers

- HOU – DeAndre Hopkins – 9 receptions, 118 yards
- KC – Travis Kelce – 10 receptions, 134 yards, 3 TD

After falling behind 24–0, Kansas City suddenly buried the Texans with an NFL playoff record 7 consecutive touchdowns and a field goal over their next eight drives, starting with a shocking 28-point second quarter.

On the opening possession, Houston mounted a six-play, 75-yard drive that culminated in Deshaun Watson’s 54-yard touchdown pass to Kenny Stills on 3rd-and-1, giving the Texans an early 7–0 lead. The Chiefs then went three-and-out on their first drive, with tight end Travis Kelce dropping a potential first down pass on third down. Dustin Colquitt’s ensuing punt was blocked by Barkevious Mingo and recovered by Lonnie Johnson Jr., who returned it 10 yards for a touchdown that put the Texans up 14–0 less than five minutes into the game.

After both teams punted on their next drives, Chiefs returner Tyreek Hill muffed the ball inside his own 10-yard line which was recovered by Keion Crossen for Houston. Two plays later, Watson found tight end Darren Fells in the end zone for a 4-yard touchdown and a 21–0 lead late in the first quarter.

The next time Houston got the ball, they drove 48 yards in 9 plays to a 4th and inches on the Chiefs 13-yard line. Rather than risk a conversion, the Texans settled for Kaʻimi Fairbairn's 31-yard field goal to go up by 24 four minutes into the second quarter. However, this would be the extent of their success, as they went on to be outscored 51-7 for the rest of the game. First, Mecole Hardman returned the ensuing kickoff 58 yards to Houston's 42-yard line. Patrick Mahomes then threw a 25-yard pass to Kelce to get in the red zone before hitting running back Damien Williams for a 17-yard touchdown. After Houston went three-and-out on their next drive, they attempted a fake punt on 4th and 4 with a direct snap to Justin Reid who was tackled by Daniel Sorensen two yards short, giving Kansas City the ball at the Texans 33. Johnson was then called for pass interference to put the ball at the five before Mahomes hit Kelce in the end zone to cut the deficit to 10. On the ensuing kickoff, DeAndre Carter fumbled the ball due to a hit by Sorenson, and it went right into the arms of Kansas City's Darwin Thompson, who returned it to the Houston 6. Mahomes then threw his third touchdown pass in less than four minutes, and his second to Kelce, to make the score 24–21.

Taking possession at their own 10 with 2:47 left in the quarter, the Chiefs went on a 90-yard drive that included another pass interference on Johnson, while Mahomes rushed twice for 35 yards and completed a pair of 20-yard passes to Hill and Kelce. Finally, with 44 seconds left in the half, Mahomes threw another five-yard touchdown to Kelce to give the Chiefs their first lead of the game, 28–24. Mahomes’ four touchdown passes in the second quarter tied an NFL postseason record set by Doug Williams in Super Bowl XXII. Fairbairn missed a 51-yard field goal as time expired in the half as the Chiefs became the first team in NFL history to fall behind by as many as 20 points in the first half but still lead at halftime.

The Chiefs would extend their lead on the opening possession of the third quarter, going 85 yards in 7 plays, the longest a 48-yard catch by Sammy Watkins. Williams ran the ball in from the goal-line, increasing their lead to 34-24 after Harrison Butker missed the extra point. After forcing another Texans punt, the Chiefs took advantage of another pass interference penalty against Houston and a 28-yard completion from Mahomes to Kelce, scoring on their sixth straight possession with another Williams touchdown run to give them a 41–24 lead with 4:39 left in the quarter. Houston finally snapped Kansas City's 41-point run when Watson completed 4 passes for 80 yards and finished the drive with a 5-yard touchdown run, making the score 41–31 with 24 seconds left in the third quarter.

Kansas City would make it seven touchdowns in a row, setting a new postseason record, on a drive that included a 23-yard pass to Kelce and a 28-yard completion to Watkins, putting the ball at the Houston 8. Mahomes then found Blake Bell in the end zone, making the score 48–31. On Houston's next drive, they turned the ball over on downs at the Chiefs 42. A pair runs by Williams for gains of 11 and 26 yard to set up Butker's 24-yard field goal with 8:06 left to put Kansas City up by 20. Houston then turned the ball over on downs on their final two possessions, the last coming when Frank Clark sacked Watson for a 17-yard loss on 4th-and-8 from the Kansas City 8-yard line.

Mahomes finished the game 23/35 for 321 yards and five touchdowns with no interceptions. He was also the leading rusher with 53 yards on seven carries. Kelce had 10 catches for 134 yards and three touchdowns, tying a Super Bowl-era postseason record. Hardman had 6 kickoff returns for 142 yards. Williams rushed for 47 yards, caught 2 passes for 21 yards, and scored 3 touchdowns. Watson threw for 388 yards and two touchdowns, while DeAndre Hopkins had 118 yards on nine catches. Kansas City's 24-point comeback was the fourth largest in postseason history, and they would go on to win Super Bowl LIV. The Texans became the first team in NFL postseason history to lose by 20 or more points after leading by 20 or more points.

== Statistics ==
=== Team ===
| Category | Total yards | Yards per game | NFL rank (out of 32) |
|---|---|---|---|
| Passing offense | 3,783 | 236.4 | 15th |
| Rushing offense | 2,009 | 125.6 | 9th |
| Total offense | 5,792 | 362.0 | 13th |
| Passing defense | 4,276 | 267.3 | 29th |
| Rushing defense | 1,937 | 121.1 | 25th |
| Total defense | 6,213 | 388.3 | 28th |

=== Individual ===
| Category | Player | Total |
Offense
| Passing yards | Deshaun Watson | 3,852 |
| Passing touchdowns | Deshaun Watson | 26 |
| Rushing yards | Carlos Hyde | 1,070 |
| Rushing touchdowns | Deshaun Watson | 7 |
| Receiving yards | DeAndre Hopkins | 1,165 |
| Receiving touchdowns | DeAndre Hopkins | 7 |
Defense
| Tackles (Solo) | Zach Cunningham | 99 |
| Sacks | Whitney Mercilus | 7.5 |
| Interceptions | Tashaun Gipson | 3 |
