= Josh Martin =

Josh Martin may refer to:

- Josh Martin (American football) (born 1991), American football player
- Josh Martin (footballer) (born 2001), English footballer
- Josh Martin (musician) (died 2018), American guitarist

== See also ==
- Joshua L. Martin (1799–1856), American politician, governor of Alabama
