= Jacob Martin (American football) =

American football player (born 1995)

- Martin with the Tennessee Titans in 2026

No. 57 – Tennessee Titans
- Position: Defensive end
- Roster status: Active

Personal information
- Born: December 11, 1995 (age 30); Aurora, Colorado, U.S.
- Listed height: 6 ft 2 in (1.88 m)
- Listed weight: 260 lb (118 kg)

Career information
- High school: Cherokee Trail (Aurora)
- College: Temple (2014–2017)
- NFL draft: 2018: 6th round, 186th overall pick

Career history
- Seattle Seahawks (2018); Houston Texans (2019–2021); New York Jets (2022); Denver Broncos (2022); Houston Texans (2023)*; Indianapolis Colts (2023); Chicago Bears (2024); Washington Commanders (2025); Tennessee Titans (2026–present)
- * Offseason or practice squad member only

Awards and highlights
- Second-team All-AAC (2017)

Career NFL statistics as of Week 10, 2026
- Tackles: 152
- Sacks: 34.0
- Forced fumbles: 8
- Fumble recoveries: 3
- Pass deflections: 8
- Stats at Pro Football Reference

Jacob W. Martin (born December 11, 1995) is an American professional football defensive end for the Tennessee Titans of the National Football League (NFL). He played college football for the Temple Owls and was selected by the Seattle Seahawks in the sixth round of the 2018 NFL draft.

== Professional career ==
Pre-draft measurables
Height	Weight	Arm length	Hand span	Wingspan	40-yard dash	10-yard split	20-yard split	20-yard shuttle	Three-cone drill	Vertical jump	Broad jump	Bench press
6 ft 2 in (1.88 m)	236 lb (107 kg)	32 5/8 in (0.83 m)	9 3/4 in (0.25 m)	6 ft 6 in (1.98 m)	4.59 s	1.68 s	2.66 s	4.44 s	6.90 s	34.5 in (0.88 m)	10 ft 1 in (3.07 m)	23 reps
All values from Pro Day

=== Seattle Seahawks ===
Martin was selected by the Seattle Seahawks in the sixth round (186th overall) of the 2018 NFL draft.

=== Houston Texans (first stint) ===
On August 31, 2019, the Seahawks traded Martin along with outside linebacker Barkevious Mingo and a 2020 third-round pick to the Houston Texans in exchange for Jadeveon Clowney. In week 9 against the Jacksonville Jaguars, Martin forced a fumble on Gardner Minshew that was recovered by teammate Zach Cunningham in the 26–3 win. In Week 12 against the Indianapolis Colts, Martin recorded his first sack as a Texan, bringing down Jacoby Brissett in the first quarter in the 20–17 win. In the American Football Conference wild card game against the Buffalo Bills, Martin sacked Josh Allen once and recovered a fumble forced by teammate Whitney Mercilus on Allen during the 22–19 overtime win.

In Week 1 of the 2020 season against the Kansas City Chiefs, Martin recorded his first sack of the season on Patrick Mahomes during the 34–20 loss. Martin was placed on the reserve/COVID-19 list by the team on November 5, and activated on November 17.

In 2021, Martin played 17 games defended 3 passes and forced 2 fumbles. He also recorded a career best 4.0 sacks while contributing 23 total tackles with 5 for a loss with scoring the first safety of his career.

=== New York Jets ===
On March 17, 2022, the New York Jets signed Martin to a three-year $16.5 million contract.

=== Denver Broncos ===
On November 1, 2022, Martin was traded along with a 2024 fifth-round pick to the Denver Broncos for a 2024 fourth-round pick. He was placed on injured reserve on December 14. Martin was released by the Broncos on May 10, 2023.

=== Houston Texans (second stint) ===
On May 23, 2023, Martin signed with the Texans. He was released by the Texans on August 29.

=== Indianapolis Colts ===
On August 31, 2023, Martin signed with the Indianapolis Colts.

=== Chicago Bears ===
On March 16, 2024, Martin signed a one-year contract with the Chicago Bears. He was placed on injured reserve on August 27. Martin was activated on October 26.

=== Washington Commanders ===
Martin (#55) with the Commanders playing against the Dallas Cowboys in 2025

On March 18, 2025, Martin signed a one-year, $3 million contract with the Washington Commanders. Martin appeared in all 17 games (including 14 starts) for the Commanders during the regular season, recording one pass defection, one forced fumble, 5.5 sacks, and 39 combined tackles.

=== Tennessee Titans ===
On March 13, 2026, Martin signed a two-year, $11 million contract with the Tennessee Titans. He was reunited with head coach Robert Saleh, who was his head coach during his time with the Jets.

== NFL career statistics ==
Legend
	Led the league
**Bold**	Career high

=== Regular season ===
Year	Team	Games		Tackles						Interceptions						Fumbles				
Year	Team	GP	GS	Cmb	Solo	Ast	Sck	TFL	Sfty	Int	Yds	Avg	Lng	TD	PD	FF	Fmb	FR	Yds	TD
2018	SEA	16	0	10	8	2	3.0	2	0	0	0	0.0	0	0	0	**2**	0	**1**	0	0
2019	HOU	14	0	11	6	5	3.5	3	0	0	0	0.0	0	0	0	1	0	**1**	0	0
2020	HOU	14	1	20	13	7	3.0	3	0	0	0	0.0	0	0	1	1	0	**1**	0	0
2021	HOU	17	14	23	11	12	4.0	**5**	**1**	0	0	0.0	0	0	**3**	**2**	0	0	0	0
2022	NYJ	8	0	8	3	5	1.5	0	0	0	0	0.0	0	0	0	1	0	0	0	0
2022	DEN	5	0	6	4	2	1.0	2	0	0	0	0.0	0	0	0	0	0	0	0	0
2023	IND	17	0	7	5	2	2.0	1	0	0	0	0.0	0	0	0	0	0	0	0	0
2024	CHI	11	0	15	9	6	3.0	3	0	0	0	0.0	0	0	1	0	0	0	0	0
2025	WAS	17	14	**39**	**17**	**22**	**5.5**	3	0	0	0	0.0	0	0	1	1	0	0	0	0
2026	TEN	9	9	13	10	3	7.5	8	0	0	0	0.0	0	0	2	0	0	0	0	0
Career		128	38	152	86	66	34.0	30	1	0	0	0.0	0	0	8	8	0	3	0	0

=== Postseason ===
Year	Team	Games		Tackles						Interceptions						Fumbles				
Year	Team	GP	GS	Cmb	Solo	Ast	Sck	TFL	Sfty	Int	Yds	Avg	Lng	TD	PD	FF	Fmb	FR	Yds	TD
2018	SEA	1	0	**4**	**2**	**2**	0.0	0	0	0	0	0.0	0	0	0	0	0	0	0	0
2019	HOU	2	0	2	**2**	0	**1.0**	**2**	0	0	0	0.0	0	0	0	0	0	**1**	0	0
Career		3	0	6	4	2	1.0	2	0	0	0	0.0	0	0	0	0	0	1	0	0

== Personal life ==
Martin is the younger brother of retired linebacker, Josh Martin, who played in the NFL for ten seasons.
