= Barkevious Mingo =

American football player (born 1990)

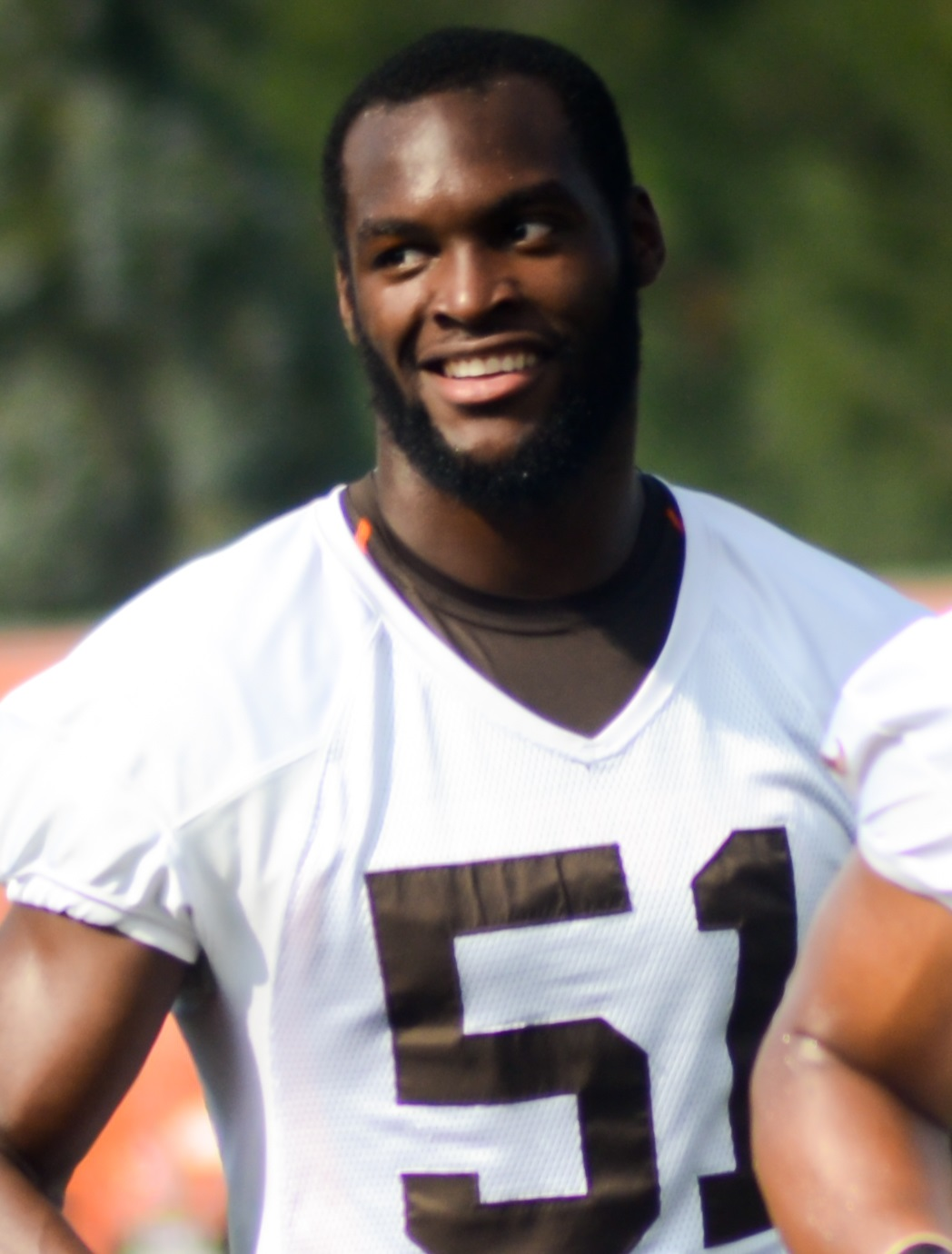
- Mingo with the Cleveland Browns in 2014

No. 51, 52, 50
- Position: Linebacker

Personal information
- Born: October 4, 1990 (age 36); Belle Glade, Florida, U.S.
- Listed height: 6 ft 5 in (1.96 m)
- Listed weight: 238 lb (108 kg)

Career information
- High school: West Monroe (West Monroe, Louisiana)
- College: LSU (2009–2012)
- NFL draft: 2013: 1st round, 6th overall pick

Career history
- Cleveland Browns (2013–2015); New England Patriots (2016); Indianapolis Colts (2017); Seattle Seahawks (2018); Houston Texans (2019); Chicago Bears (2020); Atlanta Falcons (2021)*
- * Offseason or practice squad member only

Awards and highlights
- Super Bowl champion (LI); 2× Second-team All-SEC (2011, 2012)

Career NFL statistics
- Total tackles: 255
- Sacks: 12.5
- Forced fumbles: 5
- Fumble recoveries: 5
- Interceptions: 1
- Pass deflections: 16
- Stats at Pro Football Reference

Barkevious Leon Mingo (/bɑːrˈkiːviəs/; born October 4, 1990) is an American former professional football player who was a linebacker in the National Football League (NFL). He played college football for the LSU Tigers (LSU) and was selected by the Cleveland Browns sixth overall in the 2013 NFL draft. He won Super Bowl LI with the New England Patriots.

== Early life ==
Mingo was born in Belle Glade, Florida. He attended West Monroe High School in West Monroe, Louisiana, where he was a letterman in football and track. He played football for the West Monroe Rebels team under head coach Don Shows. As a junior, he tallied 55 tackles to go with six sacks and 12 tackles for loss, leading this to be named All-State in Class 5A. As a senior in 2008, he was a 5A first-team All-state selection, after recording 59 tackles to go with seven tackles for loss and four sacks in helping lead West Monroe High School to the state championship game. He also added four forced fumbles and recovered seven fumbles. He played in the 2009 U.S. Army All-American Bowl.

Also a standout track & field athlete, Mingo was a state qualifier as a sprinter. At the 2008 Region I-5A Meet, he took gold in the 400-meter dash, with a PR of 48.92, and ran the lead leg on the West Monroe 4 × 200m and 4 × 400m squads, helping them capture the state title in both events. At the 2009 LHSAA Outdoor State T&F Championships, he took 5th in the 200-meter dash, recording a career-best time of 21.85 seconds, and finished 6th in the 400-meter dash, with a time of 49.54 seconds.

According to Rivals.com and Scout.com, Mingo was four-star college recruiting prospect. He was rated as the No. 6 strong side linebacker by Scout.com and the No. 9 by Rivals.com. He was a member of the Rivals 250 and Scout 300. He was rated as the No. 5 best athlete among linebackers by Rivals.com. He was rated as the No. 3 player in the state of Louisiana by SuperPrep and the No. 8 by Rivals.com.

College recruiting
Name	Hometown	School	Height	Weight	40^{‡}	Commit date
Barkevious Mingo; Outside linebacker	West Monroe, Louisiana	West Monroe High School	6 ft 5 in (1.96 m)	210 lb (95 kg)	4.52 (According to Scout.com)	Feb 4, 2009
Barkevious Mingo; Outside linebacker	Recruit ratings: Scout: Rivals: 247Sports:					
Overall recruit ranking: Scout: 6 (SLB) Rivals: 9 (OLB), 155 (National), 8 (Louisiana)
‡ Refers to 40-yard dash; Note: In many cases, Scout, Rivals, 247Sports, On3, and ESPN may conflict in their listings of height, weight and 40 time.; In these cases, the average was taken. ESPN grades are on a 100-point scale.; Sources: "2009 LSU Football Commitments". Rivals.; "2009 LSU Football Recruiting Commits". Scout.; "Scout.com Team Recruiting Rankings". Scout.; "2009 Team Ranking". Rivals.com.

== College career ==
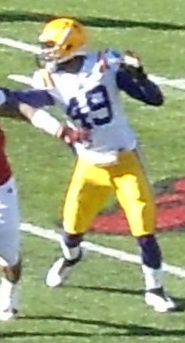
Mingo with the LSU Tigers in 2012.

Mingo attended Louisiana State University, and played for coach Les Miles's LSU Tigers football team from 2009 to 2012. He was redshirted in 2009. As a redshirt freshman in 2010, he started one of the 13 games he played in, recording 35 tackles and 3.5 sacks. As a sophomore in 2011, Mingo was a Second-team All-SEC selection after recording 47 tackles and eight sacks. In 2011, he contributed to LSU's successful SEC Championship season. As a junior in 2012, he played in all 13 games with 10 starts, and earned Second-team All-SEC honors after recording 38 tackles, 8.5 tackles for a loss, 4.5 quarterback sacks, and a team-high 12 quarterback hurries.

On January 7, 2013, Mingo announced he would forgo his senior season and enter the 2013 NFL Draft. He was one of 10 LSU Tiger underclassmen to declare for the draft that year.

== Professional career ==
External videos
- Barkevious Mingo's NFL Combine Workout

Pre-draft measurables
Height	Weight	Arm length	Hand span	Wingspan	40-yard dash	10-yard split	20-yard split	20-yard shuttle	Three-cone drill	Vertical jump	Broad jump
6 ft 4 1/4 in (1.94 m)	241 lb (109 kg)	33 3/4 in (0.86 m)	9 5/8 in (0.24 m)	6 ft 10 1/4 in (2.09 m)	4.58 s	1.60 s	2.68 s	4.39 s	6.84 s	37 in (0.94 m)	10 ft 8 in (3.25 m)
All values from NFL Combine

=== Cleveland Browns ===
==== 2013 ====
Mingo was selected by the Cleveland Browns in the first round with the sixth overall pick in the 2013 NFL draft. He was the third defensive end to be selected in the draft, after Dion Jordan and Ezekiel Ansah.

External videos
- Browns draft Barkevious Mingo sixth overall

On July 21, 2013, the Browns signed Mingo to a four-year, $16.34 million contract that included a signing bonus of $10.26 million.

Mingo was immediately moved to outside linebacker by defensive coordinator Ray Horton and competed against Jabaal Sheard for a starting role throughout training camp. On August 15, 2013, Mingo suffered a bruised lung during the Browns' 24–6 win against the Detroit Lions during their second preseason game. Mingo was hospitalized and missed the last two games of the preseason. Head coach Rob Chudzinski named Mingo a backup outside linebacker, behind Sheard and Paul Kruger, to begin the regular season.

On September 15, 2013, Mingo made his professional regular season debut after missing the season opener due to a bruised lung and recorded two solo tackles, one pass deflection, and made his first career sack during their 14–6 loss at the Baltimore Ravens in Week 2. Mingo made his first career sack on Ravens' quarterback Joe Flacco for a nine-yard loss during the first quarter. On September 29, 2013, Mingo earned his first career start in place of Sheard who was inactive due to a knee injury. In Week 13, he collected a season-high five combined tackles during a 32–28 loss against the Jacksonville Jaguars. Chudzinski was fired after the Brownsfinished the season with a 4–12 record. He finished his rookie season in 2013 with 42 combined tackles (39 solo), a career-high five sacks, and four pass deflections in 15 games and three starts.

==== 2014 ====
Mingo entered training camp as a backup outside linebacker in his first season under defensive coordinator Jim O'Neil. Head coach Mike Pettine named Mingo and Paul Kruger the starting outside linebackers to begin the regular season. They started alongside inside linebackers Craig Robertson and Karlos Dansby. Mingo was inactive for the Browns' Week 2 victory against the New Orleans Saints due to a shoulder injury. Mingo's shoulder injury was discovered to be a torn labrum, but he opted to wear a harness and play through the injury. On December 14, 2014, Mingo collected a season-high eight combined tackles during a 30–0 loss against the Cincinnati Bengals in Week 15. He finished the season with 42 combined tackles (26 solo), three pass deflections, and two sacks in 15 games and 11 starts.

==== 2015 ====
Mingo entered training camp slated as the starting strongside linebacker after Jabaal Sheard departed during free agency. On August 6, 2015, Mingo underwent arthroscopic surgery on a torn meniscus and was expected to miss 2–4 weeks. Head coach Mike Pettine retained Mingo and Paul Kruger as the starting outside linebackers to begin the regular season. Mingo was demoted to being a backup outside linebacker after Armonty Bryant was given his starting role. In Week 3, he collected a season-high four combined tackles during a 27–20 loss against the Oakland Raiders. On October 18, 2015, Mingo made one tackle, broke up one pass deflection, and made his first career interception during a 26–23 loss against the Denver Broncos in Week 6. Mingo intercepted a pass by Broncos' quarterback Peyton Manning, that was initially intended for wide receiver Demaryius Thomas, and returned it for a seven-yard return in overtime. He finished the 2015 NFL season with 24 combined tackles (15 solo), four pass deflections, and one interception in 16 games and two starts.

==== 2016 ====
On January 4, 2016, the Cleveland Browns fired head coach Mike Pettine and general manager Ray Farmer after they finished the season with a 3–13 record. On May 2, 2016, the Cleveland Browns decided not to pick up his fifth year option. Defensive coordinator Ray Horton retained the 3–4 base defense and held a competition to name starting outside linebackers between Mingo, Paul Kruger. Nate Orchard, Joe Schobert, and Emmanuel Ogbah.

=== New England Patriots ===
On August 25, 2016, the Cleveland Browns traded Mingo to the New England Patriots for a fifth-round pick (175th overall) in the 2017 NFL draft. Head coach Bill Belichick named Mingo the fourth outside linebacker on the Patriots' depth chart to start the regular season. He was listed behind Jamie Collins, Jonathan Freeny, and Shea McClellin.

In Week 6, Mingo collected a season-high two solo tackles during a 35–17 victory against the Cincinnati Bengals. Mingo was limited to 11 combined tackles (nine solo) in his only season with the Patriots, but appeared in all 16 games with zero starts. The New England Patriots finished first in the AFC East with a 14–2 record and earned a first round bye. On January 14, 2017, Mingo appeared in his first career playoff game as the Patriots defeated the Houston Texans 34–16 in the AFC Divisional Round. The following week, they defeated the Pittsburgh Steelers 36–17 in the AFC Championship. On February 5, 2017, Mingo appeared in Super Bowl LI and recorded two solo tackles as the Patriots defeated the Atlanta Falcons 34–28. Mingo appeared exclusively on special teams during the game and recorded both his tackles while covering punt returns.

=== Indianapolis Colts ===
On March 9, 2017, the Indianapolis Colts signed Mingo to a one-year, $2 million contract that includes a signing bonus of $500,000. Mingo reunited with teammate Jabaal Sheard for the third time. They were teammates on the New England Patriots and Cleveland Browns.

Mingo competed against John Simon and Jabaal Sheard to be the starting strongside linebacker. Head coach Chuck Pagano named Mingo the backup strongside linebacker, behind John Simon, to begin the regular season. In Week 16, he collected a season-high eight solo tackles and made one sack during a 23–16 loss at the Baltimore Ravens. On December 31, 2017, the Indianapolis Colts fired head coach Chuck Pagano after finishing the season with a 4–12 record. Mingo finished his lone season with the Indianapolis Colts with 47 combined tackles (35 solo), two pass deflections, and two sacks in 16 games and six starts.

=== Seattle Seahawks ===
On March 16, 2018, the Seattle Seahawks signed Mingo to a two-year, $6.80 million contract that includes $3.20 million guaranteed and a signing bonus of $2.20 million.

Throughout training camp, Mingo competed against D. J. Alexander to be a starting outside linebacker. Head coach Pete Carroll named Mingo and K. J. Wright the starting outside linebackers to begin the regular season. They started alongside middle linebacker Bobby Wagner. In Week 6, Mingo collected a season-high seven solo tackles during a 27–3 victory at the Oakland Raiders. He finished the season with a career-high 48 combined tackles (37 solo), two forced fumbles, a pass deflection, and one sack in 16 games and 14 starts.

=== Houston Texans ===
On August 31, 2019, the Seahawks traded Mingo along with outside linebacker Jacob Martin and a 2020 third-round pick to the Houston Texans in exchange for Jadeveon Clowney. In the 2019 season, Mingo mainly had a special teams role but had one start on defense, against the New England Patriots.

=== Chicago Bears ===
On April 3, 2020, the Chicago Bears signed Mingo to a one-year, $1.187 million contract. In a week 9 loss to the Tennessee Titans, Mingo was credited with the first rushing attempt of his career, gaining 11 yards and a first down after taking a hand-off on a fake punt. He appeared in 16 games and started three in the 2020 season. He finished with 2.5 sacks, 35 total tackles, and two passes defended.

=== Atlanta Falcons ===
On March 25, 2021, Mingo signed a one-year contract with the Atlanta Falcons. His contract was terminated on July 10, following his arrest.

== Career statistics ==
Legend
	Won the Super Bowl
**Bold**	Career high

=== NFL ===
==== Regular season ====
Year	Team	Defense														Rushing							
Year	Team	GP	TOTAL	SOLO	AST	SACK	FF	FR	FR YDS	INT	IR YDS	AVG IR	LNG	TD	PD	ATT	YDS	AVG	TD	LNG	FD	FUM	LST
2013	CLE	15	42	29	13	**5.0**	0	0	0	0	0	0	0	0	**4**	0	0	0	0	0	0	0	0
2014	CLE	15	42	26	**16**	2.0	0	1	0	0	0	0	0	0	**4**	0	0	0	0	0	0	0	0
2015	CLE	16	24	15	9	0.0	0	0	0	**1**	**7**	**7**	**7**	0	**4**	0	0	0	0	0	0	0	0
2016	NE	16	11	9	2	0.0	0	0	0	0	0	0	0	0	0	0	0	0	0	0	0	0	0
2017 |	IND	16	47	35	12	2.0	**3**	**3**	0	0	0	0	0	0	2	0	0	0	0	0	0	0	0
2018	SEA	16	**48**	**37**	11	1.0	**3**	1	0	0	0	0	0	0	1	0	0	0	0	0	0	0	0
2019	HOU	16	6	5	1	0.0	0	0	0	0	0	0	0	0	0	0	0	0	0	0	0	0	0
2020	CHI	16	35	23	12	2.5	0	0	0	0	0	0	0	0	2	**1**	**11**	**11**	0	**11**	**1**	0	0
Career		126	255	179	76	12.5	6	5	0	1	7	7	7	0	17	1	11	11	0	11	1	0	0

==== Postseason ====
Year	Team	GP	TOTAL	SOLO	AST	SACK	FF	FR	FR YDS	INT	IR YDS	AVG IR	LNG	TD	PD	KB
2016	NE	3	2	**2**	0	0.0	0	0	0	0	0	0	0	0	0	0
2018	SEA	1	1	1	0	0.0	0	0	0	0	0	0	0	0	0	0
2019	HOU	2	0	0	0	0.0	0	0	0	0	0	0	0	0	0	**1**
2020	CHI	1	**3**	1	**2**	0.0	0	0	0	0	0	0	0	0	0	0
Career		7	6	3	3	0.0	0	0	0	0	0	0	0	0	0	1

=== College ===
Year	Team	TOTAL	SOLO	AST	PD	SACK	FF	INT	IR YDS	TD
2010	LSU	35	18	17	0	2.5	**1**	0	0	0
2011	LSU	**47**	**22**	**25**	0	**8.0**	**1**	0	0	0
2012	LSU	38	21	17	0	4.5	**1**	0	0	0
Career		120	61	59	0	15	3	0	0	0

== Personal life ==
Mingo is the son of Hugh Mingo and Barbara Johnson. His unusual first name was created by his mother, adding the first three letters of her first name to a name she liked, Kevious. He has two brothers, Hugh and Hughtavious, who have a similar naming convention after their father.

On July 7, 2021, Mingo was arrested in Arlington, Texas, on a second-degree felony charge of indecency and sexual contact with a minor. He was later released the following day on $25,000 bond. The arrest was related to an incident alleged to have occurred in July 2019 involving the teenage friend of a family member. The charges were dismissed on December 17, 2021.
