= Lonnie Johnson Jr. =

American football player (born 1995)

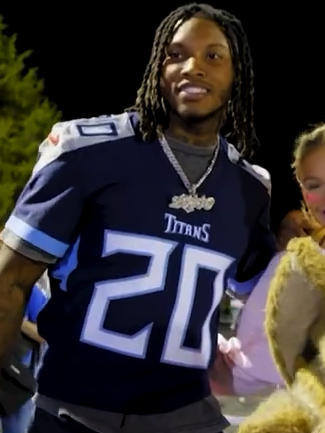
- Johnson with the Tennessee Titans in 2022

Profile
- Position: Safety

Personal information
- Born: November 4, 1995 (age 31); Gary, Indiana, U.S.
- Listed height: 6 ft 2 in (1.88 m)
- Listed weight: 222 lb (101 kg)

Career information
- High school: West Side (Gary)
- College: San Bernardino Valley (2014); Garden City CC (2015); Kentucky (2017–2018)
- NFL draft: 2019: 2nd round, 54th overall pick

Career history
- Houston Texans (2019–2021); Kansas City Chiefs (2022)*; Tennessee Titans (2022); New Orleans Saints (2023); Houston Texans (2024)*; Carolina Panthers (2024); Las Vegas Raiders (2025); Miami Dolphins (2026)*
- * Offseason or practice squad member only

Career NFL statistics as of 2025
- Total tackles: 224
- Fumble recoveries: 1
- Pass deflections: 17
- Interceptions: 4
- Stats at Pro Football Reference

Lionel "Lonnie" Johnson Jr. (born November 4, 1995) is an American professional football safety. He played college football for the Kentucky Wildcats.

== Early life ==
Johnson attended West Side Leadership Academy in Gary, Indiana. He originally committed to Ohio State University to play college football, but decommitted and went to San Bernardino Valley College. Johnson later transferred to Garden City Community College.

== College career ==
Johnson attended San Bernardino Valley College in 2014 and played wide receiver and special teams. He attended Garden City in 2015 and 2016, but did not play in 2016 to concentrate on academics. He transferred to the University of Kentucky in 2017. In two seasons at Kentucky, he had 64 tackles and one interception.

== Professional career ==
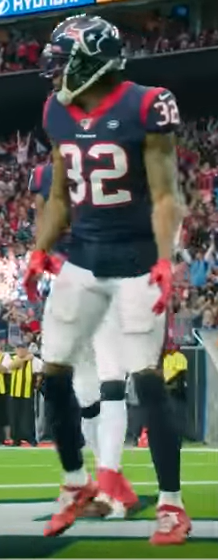
Johnson with the Texans in 2019

Pre-draft measurables
Height	Weight	Arm length	Hand span	Wingspan	40-yard dash	10-yard split	20-yard split	20-yard shuttle	Three-cone drill	Vertical jump	Broad jump	Bench press
6 ft 1 7/8 in (1.88 m)	213 lb (97 kg)	32 5/8 in (0.83 m)	9 1/8 in (0.23 m)	6 ft 5 1/2 in (1.97 m)	4.48 s	1.58 s	2.66 s	4.10 s	7.01 s	38.0 in (0.97 m)	10 ft 9 in (3.28 m)	15 reps
All values from NFL Combine/Pro Day

=== Houston Texans (first stint) ===
Johnson was selected by the Houston Texans in the second round, 54th overall, of the 2019 NFL draft. The Texans previously acquired the 54th overall pick from the Seattle Seahawks in a trade that sent Duane Brown to Seattle. On May 10, 2019, he signed his rookie contract.

In the Divisional Round of the playoffs against the Kansas City Chiefs, Johnson recovered a blocked punt and returned it for a 25-yard touchdown during the 51–31 loss. His ineffectiveness in covering Chiefs tight end Travis Kelce, in part due to an injury sustained mid-game, was cited as one of the primary reasons for the Chiefs' historic comeback win.

=== Kansas City Chiefs ===
On May 2, 2022, Johnson was traded to the Kansas City Chiefs in exchange for a 2024 conditional seventh-round pick. He was waived by Kansas City on August 15.

=== Tennessee Titans ===
Johnson was claimed off waivers by the Tennessee Titans on August 16, 2022. He was placed on injured reserve on November 17, and was activated on December 17.

=== New Orleans Saints ===
On March 21, 2023, Johnson signed a one-year contract with the New Orleans Saints. He made 12 appearances for New Orleans during the regular season, recording one interception, two pass deflections, one fumble recovery, and nine combined tackles.

=== Houston Texans (second stint) ===
On March 15, 2024, Johnson signed a one-year contract with the Houston Texans. He was released during roster cuts on August 27.

=== Carolina Panthers ===
On August 28, 2024, Johnson was signed to the Carolina Panthers' practice squad. He was promoted to the active roster on September 10.

=== Las Vegas Raiders ===
On March 13, 2025, Johnson signed with the Las Vegas Raiders. On August 2, Johnson suffered a fractured fibula after colliding with teammate Maxx Crosby during a practice at Allegiant Stadium; he began the season on injured reserve as a result. He was activated on November 6, ahead of the team's Week 10 matchup against the Denver Broncos.

=== Miami Dolphins ===
On March 12, 2026, Johnson signed a one-year contract with the Miami Dolphins. On August 30, he was released by Miami as a part of final roster cuts.

== NFL career statistics ==
Legend
**Bold**	Career high

=== Regular season ===
Year	Team	Games		Tackles					Interceptions						Fumbles				
Year	Team	GP	GS	Cmb	Solo	Ast	Sck	TFL	Int	Yds	Avg	Lng	TD	PD	FF	Fum	FR	Yds	TD
2019	HOU	14	**7**	41	34	7	0.0	0	0	0	0.0	0	0	**7**	0	0	0	0	0
2020	HOU	**16**	5	**76**	**56**	**20**	0.0	**1**	0	0	0.0	0	0	0	0	0	0	0	0
2021	HOU	14	**7**	55	38	17	0.0	0	**3**	**47**	**15.7**	**32**	0	6	0	0	0	0	0
2022	TEN	12	0	11	8	3	0.0	0	0	0	0.0	0	0	0	0	0	0	0	0
2023	NO	12	0	9	8	1	0.0	0	1	0	0.0	0	0	2	0	0	**1**	0	0
2024	CAR	15	1	7	6	1	0.0	0	0	0	0.0	0	0	0	0	0	0	0	0
2025	LV	9	2	25	14	11	0.0	0	0	0	0.0	0	0	2	0	0	0	0	0
Career		92	22	224	164	60	0.0	1	4	47	11.8	32	0	17	0	0	1	0	0

=== Postseason ===
Year	Team	Games		Tackles					Interceptions						Fumbles				
Year	Team	GP	GS	Cmb	Solo	Ast	Sck	TFL	Int	Yds	Avg	Lng	TD	PD	FF	Fum	FR	Yds	TD
2019	HOU	2	1	4	4	0	0.0	0	0	0	0.0	0	0	0	0	0	0	0	0
Career		2	1	0	0	0	0.0	0	0	0	0.0	0	0	0	0	0	0	0	0
