= Zach Cunningham =

American football player (born 1994)

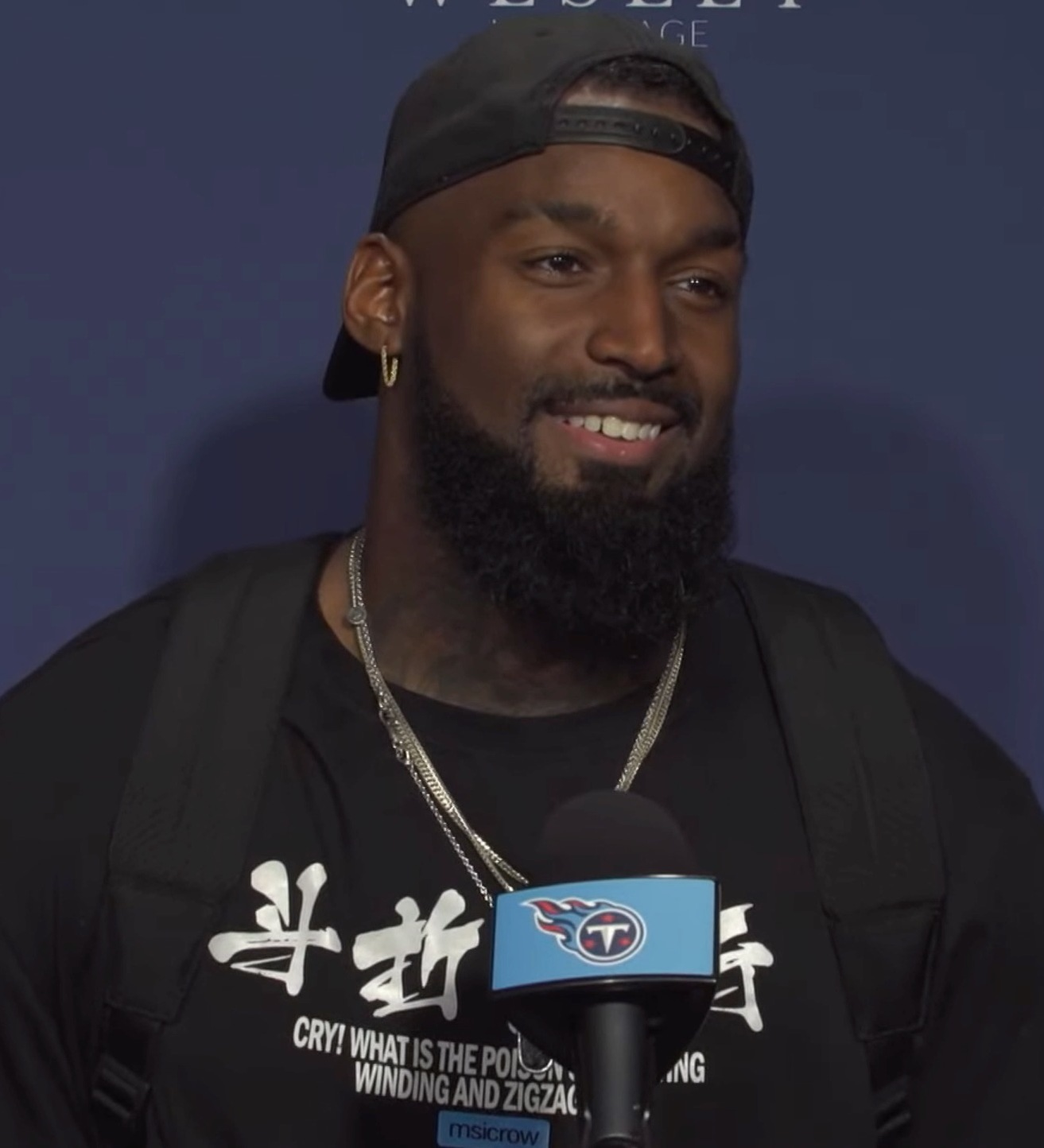
- Cunningham in 2021

Profile
- Position: Linebacker

Personal information
- Born: December 2, 1994 (age 31); Pinson, Alabama, U.S.
- Listed height: 6 ft 3 in (1.91 m)
- Listed weight: 230 lb (104 kg)

Career information
- High school: Pinson Valley
- College: Vanderbilt (2013–2016)
- NFL draft: 2017: 2nd round, 57th overall pick

Career history
- Houston Texans (2017–2021); Tennessee Titans (2021–2022); Philadelphia Eagles (2023); Denver Broncos (2024); Detroit Lions (2025)

Awards and highlights
- NFL solo tackles leader (2020); NFL combined tackles leader (2020); Unanimous All-American (2016); First-team All-SEC (2015, 2016)

Career NFL statistics as of 2025
- Total tackles: 716
- Sacks: 6.5
- Forced fumbles: 5
- Fumble recoveries: 4
- Pass deflections: 23
- Interceptions: 1
- Defensive touchdowns: 1
- Stats at Pro Football Reference

Zachary Daniel Cunningham (born December 2, 1994) is an American professional football linebacker. He played college football for the Vanderbilt Commodores and was selected in the second round of the 2017 NFL draft by the Houston Texans. He also played for the Tennessee Titans, Philadelphia Eagles, and Denver Broncos.

== Early life ==
Cunningham attended Pinson Valley High School in Pinson, Alabama. During his high school football career, he had 448 tackles, including 194 as a senior. He committed to Vanderbilt University to play college football.

== College career ==
After not playing during his first year at Vanderbilt in 2013, Cunningham played in 11 games as a redshirt freshman in 2014, recording 67 tackles and 1.5 sacks. As a redshirt sophomore in 2015, he played in all 12 games with nine starts. He finished the year with 103 tackles and 4.5 sacks and was named first-team All-Southeastern Conference (SEC). In 2016, Cunningham became the first unanimous All-American in school history and was the seventh to earn the All-American honors overall. He was a finalist for the Butkus Award as the nation's top linebacker.

Cunningham had an SEC-best 119 total tackles, which ranked 11th overall nationally. He also registered 16.5 tackles for loss, finishing second in the SEC and 22nd nationally, along with four fumble recoveries, which tied for second nationally, just one behind the leader. Cunningham played his best games against SEC opponents, as he posted 89 total tackles, 51 solo tackles and 12 tackles for loss against SEC foes. He also had some of the best individual plays in those games, including a big fourth down tackle to end Georgia's game ending drive in the Commodores' win in Athens. Cunningham made another huge, nationally-recognized play in the fourth quarter of Vanderbilt's game against Auburn, when he perfectly timed a leap over Auburn's left guard as the ball was snapped on a field goal attempt, allowing him to arrive in the backfield at the same time as the ball. Cunningham then blocked the field goal to preserve Vanderbilt's chances to win with less than 2:00 minutes remaining in the contest. A late interception by Auburn preserved the Tigers' victory, but Cunningham's leap was named Top Ten Play of the Day by ESPN.

== Professional career ==
=== Pre-draft ===
Cunningham received an invitation to the NFL Combine and completed all of the combine and positional drills. He also participated in Vanderbilt's Pro Day and opted to only run positional drills for representatives and scouts in attendance. He attended private workouts with three NFL teams: the Denver Broncos, Pittsburgh Steelers, and Jacksonville Jaguars.

External videos
- Zach Cunningham's NFL Combine Workout
- Zach Cunningham runs the 40-yard dash

At the conclusion of the pre-draft process, Cunningham was projected to be a first or second round pick by NFL draft experts and scouts. He was ranked the third best linebacker prospect in the draft by Sports Illustrated, the third best outside linebacker by NFL analyst Bucky Brooks, the fourth best outside linebacker by NFLDraftScout.com, the fourth best linebacker by NFL analyst Mike Mayock, and was ranked the fifth best linebacker by ESPN.

Pre-draft measurables
Height	Weight	Arm length	Hand span	Wingspan	40-yard dash	10-yard split	20-yard split	20-yard shuttle	Three-cone drill	Vertical jump	Broad jump	Bench press
6 ft 3 1/2 in (1.92 m)	234 lb (106 kg)	34 3/8 in (0.87 m)	9 1/4 in (0.23 m)	6 ft 10 3/8 in (2.09 m)	4.67 s	1.58 s	2.68 s	4.29 s	7.03 s	35 in (0.89 m)	10 ft 5 in (3.18 m)	15 reps
All values from NFL Combine

=== Houston Texans ===
The Houston Texans selected Cunningham in the second round with the 57th overall pick in the 2017 NFL draft.

External videos
- Texans draft Cunningham 57th overall
- NFL Draft Profile: Zach Cunningham

On May 12, 2017, the Texans signed Cunningham to a four-year, $4.47 million contract that includes $2.06 million guaranteed and a signing bonus of $1.39 million.

==== 2017 ====
Cunningham competed with Dylan Cole and Sio Moore for the starting left inside linebacker job with original starter Brian Cushing suspended for the first ten games of the season. Head coach Bill O'Brien named Cunningham the starter to begin the regular season.

He made his professional regular season debut during the Texans' season-opening 29–7 loss to the Jaguars and finished the game with five combined tackle and a pass deflection. The following week, Cunningham earned his first career start and recorded six combined tackles as the Texans defeated the Cincinnati Bengals, 13–9. On October 8, 2017, he collected nine combined tackles and forced the first fumble of his career during a 42–34 loss to the Kansas City Chiefs. In Week 13, Cunningham recorded four combined tackles and made his first career sack on Titans' quarterback Marcus Mariota in the Texans' 24–13 loss at the Tennessee Titans. In Week 17, he collected a season-high 12 combined tackles (four solo) during a 22–13 loss at the Indianapolis Colts. He finished his rookie season in 2017 with 90 combined tackles (45 solo), six pass deflections, and 1.5 sacks in 16 games and 13 starts.

==== 2018 ====
Cunningham entered training camp slated as a starting inside linebacker after Brian Cushing officially announced his retirement. Head coach Bill O'Brien named Cunningham and Whitney Mercilus the starting outside linebackers, along with middle linebacker Benardrick McKinney. He finished the 2018 season with 107 tackles, two forced fumbles, one fumble recovery, five pass breakups, and one interception.

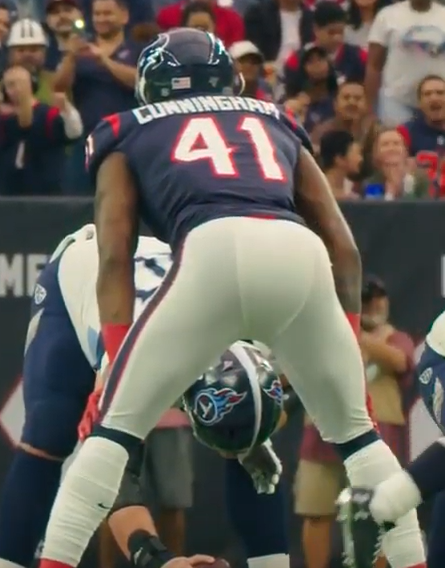
Cunningham with the Houston Texans in 2019

==== 2019 ====
In Week 2 against the Jaguars, Cunningham made a team high 10 tackles and sacked quarterback Gardner Minshew once as the Texans won 13–12. In Week 12 against the Colts on Thursday Night Football, Cunningham recorded a team high 16 tackles in the 20–17 win. In Week 14 against the Broncos, Cunningham recorded a team high 17 tackles (12 solo) during the 38–24 loss. He started all 16 games and recorded 142 total tackles (sixth in the league), two fumble recoveries, and two sacks.

==== 2020 ====
On August 30, 2020, the Texans signed Cunningham to a four-year, $58 million contract extension with $23.5 million guaranteed, making him one of the highest paid inside linebackers in the NFL.

In Week 2 against the Baltimore Ravens, Cunningham recorded a team high 15 tackles (11 solo) and sacked Lamar Jackson once during the 33–16 loss.

==== 2021 ====
Cunningham played in eight games and missed two games for the Houston Texans in 2021. He recorded 67 total tackles, one forced fumble and three pass deflections. Texans coach David Culley benched Cunningham twice over the season for violating team rules. The Texans waived Cunningham on December 8, 2021.

=== Tennessee Titans ===
The Titans claimed Cunningham off waivers on December 9, 2021.

On November 12, 2022, Cunningham was placed on injured reserve. He was activated on December 23. The Titans released him on February 22, 2023.

=== Philadelphia Eagles ===
On August 6, 2023, Cunningham signed with the Philadelphia Eagles.

=== Denver Broncos ===
On September 25, 2024, Cunningham was signed to the Denver Broncos' practice squad. On November 27, he was promoted to the active roster.

=== Detroit Lions ===
On May 27, 2025, Cunningham was signed by the Detroit Lions. On October 22, Cunningham was placed on injured reserve after aggravating a hamstring injury in Week 7 against the Tampa Bay Buccaneers. This happened immediately after returning from a three‑week absence caused by a previous hamstring injury. Cunningham did not play the rest of the season.

== NFL career statistics ==
Legend
	Led the league
**Bold**	Career high

=== Regular season ===
Year	Team	Games		Tackles				Interceptions						Fumbles			
Year	Team	GP	GS	Cmb	Solo	Ast	Sck	PD	Int	Yds	Avg	Long	TD	FF	FR	Yds	TD
2017	HOU	16	13	90	48	42	1.5	**6**	0	0	0	0	0	1	0	0	0
2018	HOU	14	14	107	73	34	0	5	**1**	**38**	**38**	**38**	**1**	**2**	1	0	0
2019	HOU	16	16	142	99	43	2	2	0	0	0	0	0	0	**2**	**24**	0
2020	HOU	16	16	**164**	**106**	**58**	**3**	2	0	0	0	0	0	1	0	0	0
2021	2TM	14	11	93	51	42	0	3	0	0	0	0	0	1	0	0	0
2021	HOU	10	7	67	32	35	0	3	0	0	0	0	0	1	0	0	0
2021	TEN	4	4	26	19	7	0	0	0	0	0	0	0	0	0	0	0
2022	TEN	6	6	24	15	9	0	1	0	0	0	0	0	0	0	0	0
2023	PHI	13	10	85	54	31	0	4	0	0	0	0	0	0	1	0	0
2024	DEN	7	0	4	2	2	0	0	0	0	0	0	0	0	0	0	0
Career		102	86	709	448	261	6.5	23	1	38	38	38	1	5	4	24	0

=== Postseason ===
Year	Team	Games		Tackles				Interceptions						Fumbles			
Year	Team	GP	GS	Cmb	Solo	Ast	Sck	PD	Int	Yds	Avg	Long	TD	FF	FR	Yds	TD
2018	HOU	1	1	8	6	2	0	1	0	0	0	0	0	0	0	0	0
2019	HOU	2	2	16	10	6	0	2	0	0	0	0	0	0	0	0	0
2021	TEN	1	1	10	8	2	0	0	0	0	0	0	0	0	0	0	0
2023	PHI	1	1	9	4	5	0	2	0	0	0	0	0	0	0	0	0
2024	DEN	1	0	0	0	0	0	0	0	0	0	0	0	0	0	0	0
Career		6	5	43	28	15	0	5	0	0	0	0	0	0	0	0	0
