= Buddy Howell =

American football player (born 1996)

Profile
- Position: Running back

Personal information
- Born: March 27, 1996 (age 30); Coconut Grove, Florida, U.S.
- Listed height: 6 ft 1 in (1.85 m)
- Listed weight: 218 lb (99 kg)

Career information
- High school: Coral Gables
- College: Florida Atlantic (2014–2017)
- NFL draft: 2018: undrafted

Career history
- Miami Dolphins (2018)*; Houston Texans (2018–2020); Los Angeles Rams (2021); BC Lions (2023)*
- * Offseason or practice squad member only

Awards and highlights
- Super Bowl champion (LVI)

Career NFL statistics
- Rushing yards: 85
- Rushing average: 3.3
- Receptions: 1
- Receiving yards: 3
- Stats at Pro Football Reference

Gregory "Buddy" Howell Jr. (born March 27, 1996) is an American professional football running back. He played college football for the Florida Atlantic Owls, where he played in 39 games with 16 starts and finished his career with 463 carries for 2,424 yards and 22 touchdowns. Howell signed with the Miami Dolphins after going undrafted in the 2018 NFL draft.

== Professional career ==
Pre-draft measurables
Height	Weight	Arm length	Hand span	40-yard dash	10-yard split	20-yard split	20-yard shuttle	Three-cone drill	Vertical jump	Broad jump	Bench press
6 ft 0 1/8 in (1.83 m)	219 lb (99 kg)	29 1/4 in (0.74 m)	9 3/8 in (0.24 m)	4.55 s	1.61 s	2.64 s	4.51 s	7.55 s	27.5 in (0.70 m)	9 ft 8 in (2.95 m)	19 reps
All values from Pro Day

=== Miami Dolphins ===
Howell signed with the Miami Dolphins as an undrafted free agent following the 2018 NFL draft. He was waived by the team on September 1, 2018.

=== Houston Texans ===
On September 2, 2018, Howell was claimed off waivers by the Houston Texans. He signed a contract extension with the team on March 1, 2021. He was waived on August 31, 2021.

=== Los Angeles Rams ===
On September 2, 2021, Howell was signed to the Los Angeles Rams practice squad. He was promoted to the active roster on October 19, 2021. He was placed on injured reserve on December 4, and activated on December 25. Howell won Super Bowl LVI when the Rams defeated the Cincinnati Bengals 23–20.

=== BC Lions ===
On January 26, 2023, Howell signed with the BC Lions of the Canadian Football League (CFL). On May 29, 2023, Howell was released by the Lions.
