= James Liipfert =

American football executive

Houston Texans
- Title: Assistant general manager

Personal information
- Born: 1985 or 1986 (age 40–41); Macon, Georgia, U.S.
- Listed height: 6 ft 2 in (1.88 m)
- Listed weight: 200 lb (91 kg)

Career information
- High school: The Westfield School (Perry, Georgia)
- College: Georgia Tech (2005–2008)
- NFL draft: 2009: undrafted

Career history
- New England Patriots (2009-2017); Scouting assistant (2009-2010); Area scout (2011-2014); National scout (2015-2017); Houston Texans (2018–present); Director of college scouting (2018-2020); Assistant director of player personnel and college scouting (2021-2022); Executive director of player personnel (2023-2024); Assistant general manager (2025-present)

Awards and highlights
- 2× Super Bowl champion (XLIX, LI)

James Liipfert (born 1985 or 1986) is an American professional football executive who is the assistant general manager for the Houston Texans of the National Football League (NFL). He played college football for the Georgia Tech Yellow Jackets and has also worked as a scout for the New England Patriots.

== Early life ==
Liipfert was born in 1985 or 1986 in Macon, Georgia, and grew up in Marshallville. He is of German descent; his family's name was originally Lüüpfert. Liipfert grew up a fan of the Atlanta Falcons and wore a Deion Sanders jersey for his first day of school. He attended The Westfield School in Perry, where he began playing football in seventh grade. He became a starter for the Westfield football team as a sophomore and wore number 21 to be like Sanders. There, Liipfert was a fullback, linebacker and punter, running for over 800 yards during the 2002 season while reaching the Class AAA state championship. He was the 2002 GISA 3-AAA Player of the Year. At Westfield, Liipfert won all-state honors in football and baseball.

After high school, Liipfert walked-on to play college football for the Georgia Tech Yellow Jackets from 2005 to 2008, seeing action as a linebacker and special teamer. As a freshman in 2005, he posted one tackle in one game. He did not play as a sophomore, but appeared in 12 games in 2007, making two tackles, and 13 games in 2008, making 11 tackles. He totaled 14 tackles in his collegiate career and reached a bowl game in each of his seasons at Georgia Tech. Liipfert graduated from Georgia Tech in 2009 with a degree in management.

== Executive career ==
Liipfert joined the New England Patriots as a scouting assistant in 2009 after his playing career ended. In this position, one of his duties was driving free agents to team facilities and writing scouting reports about them. He served in that role for two seasons before receiving a promotion to area scout in 2011. He later became a national scout in 2015 and served in that capacity through 2017. Executive Pat Stewart described Liipfert as having become "one of the better evaluators in the league" during his stay with the Patriots. During his stint with the Patriots, he won Super Bowl XLIX against the Seattle Seahawks and Super Bowl LI against the Atlanta Falcons.

In 2018, Liipfert was hired by the Houston Texans as director of college scouting. Leading the team's scouting operations, he helped the Texans draft players including future Pro Bowlers C. J. Stroud, Will Anderson Jr., Derek Stingley Jr. and Nico Collins. The Texans made the playoffs in the 2023, 2024, and 2025 seasons. He received a promotion to assistant general manager in 2025. In 2026, Liipfert was a finalist to become the new general manager for the Atlanta Falcons.

== Personal life ==
Liipfert and his wife, Lacy, have two children. He met his wife while in Louisiana scouting cornerback Robert Alford.
