= Josh Martin (American football) =

American football player (born 1991)

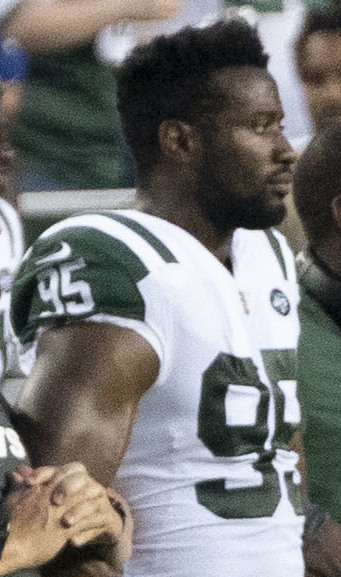
- Martin with the New York Jets in 2018

No. 95, 59
- Position: Linebacker

Personal information
- Born: November 7, 1991 (age 34); Houston, Texas, U.S.
- Listed height: 6 ft 3 in (1.91 m)
- Listed weight: 245 lb (111 kg)

Career information
- High school: Cherokee Trail (Aurora, Colorado)
- College: Columbia
- NFL draft: 2013: undrafted

Career history
- Kansas City Chiefs (2013–2014); Tampa Bay Buccaneers (2015); Indianapolis Colts (2015)*; New York Jets (2015–2018); New Orleans Saints (2019)
- * Offseason or practice squad member only

Career NFL statistics
- Total tackles: 86
- Sacks: 2.5
- Forced fumbles: 1
- Stats at Pro Football Reference

Josh Martin (born November 7, 1991) is an American former professional football player who was a linebacker for seven seasons in the National Football League (NFL). He played college football for the Columbia Lions. Martin signed with the Kansas City Chiefs as an undrafted free agent in 2013, and was also a member of the Tampa Bay Buccaneers, Indianapolis Colts, New York Jets and New Orleans Saints.

== Professional career ==
=== Kansas City Chiefs ===
In 2013 Martin was signed as an undrafted free agent. On September 24, 2013, he was waived. On September 26, 2013, he was signed to the Chiefs' practice squad. On November 30, 2013, he was elevated to the active roster. On April 6, 2015, he was re-signed. On September 7, 2015, he was waived. On September 8, 2015, he was placed on injured reserve. On September 9, 2015, he was waived from injured reserve.

=== Tampa Bay Buccaneers ===
On September 22, 2015, Martin was signed by the Tampa Bay Buccaneers. On October 7, 2015, he was waived. On October 8, 2015, he was placed on injured reserve. On October 14, 2015, he was waived from injured reserve.

=== Indianapolis Colts ===
On October 31, 2015, Martin was signed to the practice squad of the Indianapolis Colts.

=== New York Jets ===
On November 24, 2015, Martin was signed to the New York Jets' practice squad.

On March 9, 2017, Martin signed a two-year, $4.3 million contract extension with the Jets.

On October 1, 2018, Martin was placed on injured reserve after suffering a concussion in Week 4.

=== New Orleans Saints ===
On July 25, 2019, Martin was signed by the New Orleans Saints. He was placed on injured reserve on August 30, 2019.

== Personal life ==
Martin is the older brother of professional defensive end, Jacob Martin, who currently plays for the Tennessee Titans.
