= How Will I Know if Heaven Will Find Me? =

Studio album by The Amazons
- Released: 9 September 2022
- Genre: Pop rock; arena rock; country rock; Americana; jangle pop; indie pop
- Length: 43:47
- Label: Fiction; Universal
- Producer: Jim Abbiss

The Amazons chronology
Future Dust (2019)	How Will I Know if Heaven Will Find Me? (2022)	21st Century Fiction (2025)

Singles from How Will I Know if Heaven Will Find Me?
- 1. "Bloodrush" Released: 24 March 2022; 2. "Ready for Something" Released: 2 June 2022; 3. "How Will I Know?" Released: 21 July 2022; 4. "There's a Light" Released: 24 August 2022

How Will I Know if Heaven Will Find Me? is the third studio album by British alternative rock band the Amazons. The album was released on 9 September 2022 through Fiction Records and Universal Music Group. The album is the last to feature drummer Joe Emmett, who departed the band shortly after the album's release.

== Music and composition ==
The album has been described by critics as having numerous genre influences, including elements of country rock and Americana, as well as jangle pop, indie pop, arena rock, and pop rock.

== Critical reception ==
Professional ratings
Review scores
Source	Rating
Gigwise	9/10 stars
The Irish Times	4/5 stars
NME	3/5 stars
Record Collector	3/5 stars

How Will I Know if Heaven Will Find Me? has received generally positive reviews from contemporary music critics.

In a positive review, Karl Blakesley gave the album nine stars out of ten, summarising the album as "an utterly blissful" and "hugely uplifting record". Blakesley described How Will I Know if Heaven Will Find Me? as "a complete contrast to the darkness of previous album Future Dust, on HWIKIHWFM the band discover brighter and more profound sonic territory. The loud heavy riffs mostly take a back seat this time around, replaced instead with a greater focus on the songcraft and some noticeable country/Americana influences."

Siobhán Kane, writing for The Irish Times, gave How Will I Know if Heaven Will Find Me? a positive review, giving the album four stars out of five. Kane described the album as an "expansive" album with an eclectic mix of genres, specifically saying that the album had "a jangly guitar-led soundscape", as well as "broken beats and clear guitars (that) dance around Thomson's folk-influenced vocal". Kane summarised the album as "all indie-pop joy".

In a mixed review, Rhys Buchanan with NME dismissed the album as an album loaded with "stadium-ready anthems" and that "the Reading band aren't about to mess with the formula with album three". Buchanan awarded How Will I Know if Heaven Will Find Me? three stars out of five. John Earls, writing for Record Collector, also offered a mixed review of the album. Earls said "mostly the band are happy to offer sturdy would-be epics in the vein of their early near-hit 'Junk Food Forever'. If they sometimes strain too hard to pull off The Joshua Tree universality."

== Track listing ==
All lyrics are written by Matthew Thomson; all music is composed by Matthew Thomson, Chris Alderton, Elliot James Briggs, and Josef Emmett.

How Will I Know if Heaven Will Find Me? track listing
No.	Title	Length
1.	"How Will I Know?"	3:59
2.	"Bloodrush"	3:58
3.	"Say It Again"	4:15
4.	"There's a Light"	4:18
5.	"Northern Star"	4:47
6.	"Wait for Me"	2:57
7.	"One by One"	3:57
8.	"Ready for Something"	3:57
9.	"For the Night"	4:11
10.	"In the Morning"	3:36
11.	"I'm Not Ready"	3:52
Total length:		43:47

Deluxe edition bonus tracks
No.	Title	Length
12.	"How Will I Know?" (edit)	3:38
13.	"Bloodrush" (edit)	3:37
14.	"How Will I Know?" (acoustic)	3:44
15.	"Bloodrush" (acoustic)	3:32
16.	"Wait for Me" (acoustic)	3:24
Total length:		61:42

== Personnel ==
- Greg Calbi – mastering
- Jim Abbiss – producer

== Charts ==
Chart performance for How Will I Know if Heaven Will Find Me?
Chart (2022)	Peak position
Scottish Albums (OCC)	5
UK Albums (OCC)	5
