= Holy Roller =

Term referring to members of the Wesleyan-Holiness movement in the US

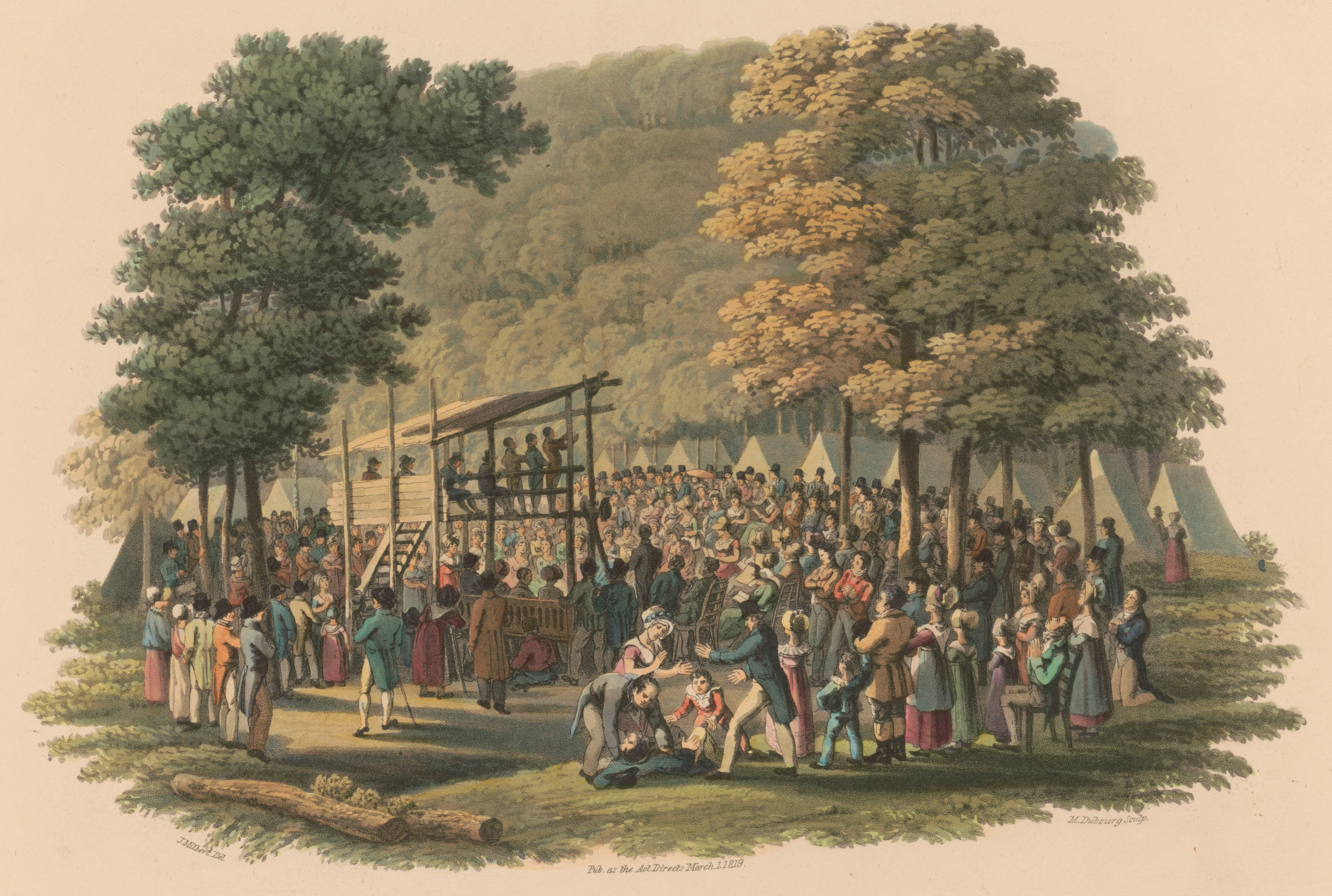
Methodist preachers are known for promulgating the doctrines of the new birth and entire sanctification to the public at events such as tent revivals and camp meetings, which they believe is the reason that God raised them up into existence.

Holy Roller and Holy Jumper are terms originating in the 18th century that have been used to refer to adherents of the Methodist tradition, such as Free Methodists, Wesleyan Methodists, and Calvinistic Methodists. The term describes dancing, shaking or other boisterous movements by church attendees who perceive themselves as being under the influence of the Holy Spirit.

Holy Rolling is sometimes used derisively by those outside these denominations, as if to describe people literally rolling on the floor in an uncontrolled manner. Those within the Methodist traditions have reclaimed the term as a badge of honor.

== Description ==
Holy Roller or Holy Jumper are terms used to describe Methodist worship, from its early days and into the holiness movement, including Free Methodists, Wesleyan Methodists, and Calvinistic Methodists. During the days of the Evangelical Revival, the Methodists of Wales who experienced the New Birth "could frequently be heard weeping, groaning and shouting out in both agony and ectasy" and engaging in "dancing, jumping, and exuberant singing." Holy Rolling is sometimes used derisively by those outside these denominations, as if to describe people literally rolling on the floor in an uncontrolled manner.

Many individuals in the wider Methodist tradition are also referred to by others as Shouting Methodists due to the ejaculatory prayers congregants often utter during the service of worship, such as "Praise the Lord!", "Hallelujah!", and "Amen!

Similar disparaging terms directed at outspoken Christians but later embraced by them include Jesus freaks or, from former centuries, Quakers and Shakers.

With the rise of Holiness Pentecostalism in the early 20th century, the term Holy Roller has been applied to Holiness Pentecostals as well. Holiness Pentecostals who reject modern medicine have been referred to as followers of the "pokeweed gospel" or members of the "lightning bug church."

== History ==
Historians trace the term "Holy Jumper" or "Welsh Jumper" to 1762, when it was used to describe Methodists who experienced the New Birth during the second wave of the Evangelical Revival in Llangeitho in 1762. Merriam-Webster traces the expression "Holy Roller" to 1841. The Oxford English Dictionary cites an 1893 memoir by Charles Godfrey Leland, in which he says "When the Holy Spirit seized them ... the Holy Rollers ... rolled over and over on the floor." The term describes dancing, shaking or other boisterous movements by church attendees who perceive themselves as being under the influence of the Holy Spirit.

Those within related Wesleyan traditions have reclaimed the term as a badge of honor; for example William Branham wrote: "And what the world calls today holy-roller, that's the way I worship Jesus Christ." Gospel singer Andraé Crouch stated, "They call us holy rollers, and what they say is true. But if they knew what we were rollin' about, they'd be rollin' too." Decades earlier, in the notes for his 1960 album Blues & Roots, jazz musician Charles Mingus used the term, seemingly neutrally and as a simple description, to indicate his own religious upbringing.

== Usage ==
=== Politics ===
- Gifford Pinchot in 1919: "Apparently no meeting for any purpose is to be tolerated except the Holy Roller meetings themselves. These theoretically and in fact ... The Holy Roller church in this community, as elsewhere, in its total influence promotes immorality. ..."
- The New York Times on May 2, 1923: "Bound Brook Mob Raids Klan Meeting: Thousand Hostile Citizens Surround Church and Lock In 100 Holy Rollers. ... Until the arrival of eight State troopers to reinforce the local police here at 1 o'clock this morning about one hundred members of the Holy Rollers were ..."
- Time on October 12, 1936: "When Jesus Christ first appeared to His assembled disciples after His resurrection, He told them that believers 'shall speak with new tongues; they shall take up serpents' (Mark: 16:17, 18). To many a U.S. religionist of the Pentecostal or "Holy Roller" variety, the 'gift of tongues' has long been vivid reality.
- William L. Shirer in Berlin Diary: The Journal of a Foreign Correspondent, 1934-1941 described the look on the faces of hysterical Nazis calling for Adolf Hitler to come out of his hotel in September 1934: "They reminded me of the crazed expressions I saw once in the back country of Louisiana on the faces of some Holy Rollers who were about to hit the trail."
- Sarah Palin on January 19, 2016, referred to some in the crowd as "holy rollers" when she endorsed Donald Trump: "Looking around at all of you, you hard working Iowa families, you farm families and teachers and teamsters and cops and cooks, you rock and rollers and holy rollers! You all make the world go around and now our cause is one."

=== Poetry ===
- G. K. Chesterton wrote a poem entitled "To A Holy Roller."

=== Literature ===
- Stephen King wrote "Too much Holy-rolling." in his short story Ur, contained within the collection titled The Bazaar of Bad Dreams.

=== Music ===
- Joe Hill's 1911 song "The Preacher and the Slave" contains the lines "Holy Rollers and Jumpers come out / And they holler, they jump and they shout".
- The 1969 Beatles song "Come Together" contains the line "he one holy roller".
- The Scottish hard rock band Nazareth has a song titled "Holy Roller"—first officially released 1975 on Greatest Hits—which uses the term throughout the song's lyrics.
- "Holy Roller" is a song by Country Joe McDonald from his 1981 album Into the Fray.
- In the 1982 stage musical Little Shop of Horrors, the song "Dentist" has the lyrics "When I start extracting those molars, you girls will be screaming like Holy Rollers."
- "Holy Rollers" is a song by Canadian alternative rock band Sons of Freedom, from their eponymous 1988 debut album.
- "Holy Roller" is the fourth track on the album Apple released in July 1990 by Mother Love Bone.
- "Holy Roller" is the protagonist from the 1993 song "Servitude," from the album Give a Monkey a Brain and He'll Swear He's the Center of the Universe by the American rock band Fishbone.
- The 1994 Trance Zomba album by Argentine band Babasónicos features a song called "Patinador Sagrado", which in itself is a mistranslation of the term, using it in the sense of rollerskating, a trend that continues throughout the song's lyrics.
- Holy Roller is a 1999 compilation album by Reverend Horton Heat.
- "Ms. Holy Roller" is the fifth track on Will Smith's 2005 album Lost and Found.
- "Holy Roller" is the first track on the 2007 album Venom & Tears by the American metalcore/groove metal/hardcore punk band Throwdown.
- The American alternative/folk rock group Thao & the Get Down Stay Down has a song titled "Holy Roller" that was released as a single on October 24, 2012, and was included in their 2013 album We the Common.
- The American rock band Portugal. The Man released a song titled “Holy Roller (Hallelujah)” on their 2013 album Evil Friends.
- Spoon's 2014 single "Inside Out" contains the line "I don't make time for holy rollers".
- The 2014 Thank You Scientist song "Feed The Horses" contains the line, "I won't be your holy roller..."
- "Holy Roller" is the title of the 10th track on the 2015 Awolnation album Run.
- The 2016 Panic! at the Disco album Death of a Bachelor contains the line "Turn the memory to stone and carve your shoulder/Hey, holy roller" in the song The Good, the Bad, and the Dirty.
- The phrase is also the name of the 9th song on The Amazons' debut album from 2017.
- ”Traveling On”, a 2018 song by the Portland folk rock band The Decemberists, contains a reference to holy rollers.
- "Holy Roller" is the second track on Emily Wolfe's self-titled 2019 album.
- "Holy Roller" is also the title of the seventh track on the 2020 album Walking Like We Do by The Big Moon.
- "Holy Roller" is a 2020 song by the Canadian metalcore band Spiritbox.
- "Holy Roller" is a song by Zach Bryan and Sierra Ferrell on the former's 2023 self-titled album.
- "Holy Roller" is the first single from The Format's 2026 comeback album Boycott Heaven. The song was released on October 6, 2025, after being on hiatus since 2008.

=== Television ===
- In the 12th episode of the seventh season of The Simpsons, "Team Homer", one of the rival bowling teams, made up of important figures from the local church, is named "The Holy Rollers."
- In the 11th episode of the third season of Mama's Family, "Where There's Smoke". When asked about a young female convict's religion Mama says. "She's means Holy Rollers." to keep up a charade that the girl can't speak any English and is from Sweden.. Guest star Yeardley Smith.
- In the episode of Frasier, titled "Wheels of Fortune," Frasier's dad tells Michael Keaton he's a holy roller, after Keaton goes around doing evangelical sermons from his wheelchair.

=== Sports ===
- The "Holy Roller" play was a game-winning play executed by the Oakland Raiders to beat the San Diego Chargers on September 10, 1978. Quarterback Ken Stabler fumbled the ball forward and several Raiders teammates (Pete Banaszak and Dave Casper) aided the ball's roll into the end zone for the game winning touchdown. The NFL amended its rules in the off-season to prevent the recurrence of such a play.

== See also ==
- Camp meeting
- Entire sanctification
- Speaking in tongues
- Tent revival
- Trance#Trance in American Christianity
