= 2019 NFL season =

American football season

- The NFL's centennial logo, which was used throughout the 2019 season

Regular season
- Duration: September 5, 2019 – December 29, 2019

Playoffs
- Start date: January 4, 2020
- AFC Champions: Kansas City Chiefs
- NFC Champions: San Francisco 49ers

Super Bowl LIV
- Date: February 2, 2020
- Site: Hard Rock Stadium, Miami Gardens, Florida
- Champions: Kansas City Chiefs

Pro Bowl
- Date: January 26, 2020
- Site: Camping World Stadium, Orlando, Florida

AFC teams: West, North, South, East
NFC teams: West, North, South, East

The 2019 NFL season was the 100th season of the National Football League (NFL) and the 54th of the Super Bowl era. The season began on September 5, 2019, with the NFL Kickoff Game, in which the Green Bay Packers defeated the Chicago Bears. The season concluded with Super Bowl LIV, the league's championship game, on February 2, 2020, at Hard Rock Stadium in Miami, Florida, in which the American Football Conference (AFC) champion Kansas City Chiefs defeated the National Football Conference (NFC) champion San Francisco 49ers 31–20 to win their second Super Bowl championship. This was also the final NFL season with the 12-team playoff format, as two more teams were added to the annual NFL playoffs as of the 2020 NFL season.

The 2019 season was also the last season for the Oakland Raiders after playing in Oakland for 47 non-consecutive years before their relocation to Las Vegas for 2020 with the completion of Allegiant Stadium. The Raiders were previously approved for relocation in March 2017 but spent the last two seasons at RingCentral Coliseum.

== Player movement ==
The 2019 NFL league year and trading period began on March 13. On March 8, teams were allowed to exercise 2019 options for players with option clauses in their contracts, to submit qualifying offers to their pending restricted free agents and to submit minimum salary tenders to retain exclusive negotiating rights to their players with expiring 2018 contracts who had fewer than three accrued seasons of free-agent credit. Teams were required to be under the salary cap using the "Top 51" definition (in which the team's 51 highest-paid players must have a combined salary cap). On March 11, clubs were allowed to contact and begin contract negotiations with the agents of players who were set to become unrestricted free agents.

This season's salary cap increased to $188.2 million per team, up from $177.2 million in 2018.

=== Free agency ===
Free agency began on March 13. Notable players to change teams included:

- Quarterbacks Blake Bortles (Jacksonville to Los Angeles Rams), Ryan Fitzpatrick (Tampa Bay to Miami), and Nick Foles (Philadelphia to Jacksonville).
- Running backs C. J. Anderson (Los Angeles Rams to Detroit), Le'Veon Bell (Pittsburgh to New York Jets), Tevin Coleman (Atlanta to San Francisco), Frank Gore (Miami to Buffalo), Kareem Hunt (Kansas City to Cleveland), Mark Ingram II (New Orleans to Baltimore), and LeSean McCoy (Buffalo to Kansas City).
- Wide receivers Danny Amendola (Miami to Detroit), Cole Beasley (Dallas to Buffalo), John Brown (Baltimore to Buffalo), Randall Cobb (Green Bay to Dallas), Cordarrelle Patterson (New England to Chicago), Andre Roberts (New York Jets to Buffalo), Golden Tate (Philadelphia to New York Giants), and Demaryius Thomas (Houston to New England).
- Tight ends Charles Clay (Buffalo to Arizona) and Jesse James (Pittsburgh to Detroit).
- Offensive linemen Trent Brown (New England to Oakland), Ja'Wuan James (Miami to Denver), Mitch Morse (Kansas City to Buffalo), and Rodger Saffold (Los Angeles Rams to Tennessee).
- Defensive linemen Trey Flowers (New England to Detroit), Malik Jackson (Jacksonville to Philadelphia), Gerald McCoy (Tampa Bay to Carolina), Sheldon Richardson (Minnesota to Cleveland), Ndamukong Suh (Los Angeles Rams to Tampa Bay), and Cameron Wake (Miami to Tennessee).
- Linebackers Kwon Alexander (Tampa Bay to San Francisco), Vontaze Burfict (Cincinnati to Oakland), Thomas Davis (Carolina to Los Angeles Chargers), Jordan Hicks (Philadelphia to Arizona), Justin Houston (Kansas City to Indianapolis), Clay Matthews (Green Bay to Los Angeles Rams), CJ Mosley (Baltimore to New York Jets), Preston Smith (Washington to Green Bay), Za'Darius Smith (Baltimore to Green Bay), and Terrell Suggs (Baltimore to Arizona).
- Defensive backs Adrian Amos (Chicago to Green Bay), Ha Ha Clinton-Dix (Washington to Chicago), Landon Collins (New York Giants to Washington), Lamarcus Joyner (Los Angeles Rams to Oakland), Tyrann Mathieu (Houston to Kansas City), Earl Thomas (Seattle to Baltimore), and Eric Weddle (Baltimore to Los Angeles Rams).
- Kicker Jason Myers (New York Jets to Seattle).

=== Trades ===
The following notable trades were made during the 2019 league year:

- March 13: Baltimore traded QB Joe Flacco to Denver for their 2019 fourth-round selection (113th overall).
- March 13: The New York Giants traded WR Odell Beckham Jr. and DE Olivier Vernon to Cleveland for G Kevin Zeitler, SS Jabrill Peppers, their 2019 first-round selection (17th overall), and their 2019 third-round selection (95th overall).
- March 13: Philadelphia traded DE Michael Bennett and a 2020 seventh-round selection to New England for their 2020 fifth-round selection.
- March 13: Pittsburgh traded WR Antonio Brown to Oakland for their 2019 third-round selection (66th overall) and their 2019 fifth-round selection (141st overall).
- March 13: Oakland traded G Kelechi Osemele and their 2019 sixth-round selection (196th overall) to the New York Jets for their 2019 fifth-round selection (140th overall).
- March 13: Tampa Bay traded WR DeSean Jackson and their 2020 seventh-round selection to Philadelphia for their 2019 sixth-round selection (197th overall).
- March 13: Kansas City traded OLB Dee Ford to San Francisco for their 2020 second-round selection.
- March 15: Miami traded QB Ryan Tannehill and their 2019 sixth-round selection (188th overall) to Tennessee for their 2019 seventh-round selection (233rd overall) and their 2020 fourth-round selection.
- March 28: Miami traded DE Robert Quinn to Dallas for their 2020 sixth-round selection.
- March 28: Chicago traded RB Jordan Howard to Philadelphia for their 2020 sixth-round selection.
- April 1: Cleveland traded DE Emmanuel Ogbah to Kansas City for SS Eric Murray.
- April 23: Seattle traded DE Frank Clark and their 2019 third-round selection (92nd overall) to Kansas City for their 2019 first-round selection (29th overall), their 2019 third-round selection (84th overall), and a 2020 second-round selection.
- April 26: Arizona traded QB Josh Rosen and a 2020 fifth-round selection to Miami for their 2019 second-round selection (62nd overall).
- August 8: Cleveland traded RB Duke Johnson to Houston for a 2020 third round pick.
- August 9: Buffalo traded DE Eli Harold to Philadelphia for OL Ryan Bates.
- August 22: Arizona traded S Rudy Ford to Philadelphia for DT Bruce Hector.
- August 28: New England traded a 2020 fourth-round pick to Baltimore for a 2020 sixth-round pick and G Jermaine Eluemunor.
- August 31: Miami traded OT Laremy Tunsil and WR Kenny Stills to Houston for S Johnson Bademosi, OT Julién Davenport, for a 2020 first-round pick, a 2021 first-round pick and second-round pick.
- August 31: Houston traded OT Martinas Rankin to Kansas City for RB Carlos Hyde.
- September 1: Houston traded DE Jadeveon Clowney to Seattle for a 2020 third round pick, DE Jacob Martin, and DE Barkevious Mingo.
- September 2: Miami traded LB Kiko Alonso to New Orleans for LB Vince Biegel.
- September 10: New England traded WR Demaryius Thomas to the New York Jets for a 2021 sixth-round selection.
- September 16: Miami traded S Minkah Fitzpatrick and a 2020 fifth round pick and 2021 sixth round pick to Pittsburgh in exchange for their 2020 first and fifth round picks, and their 2021 sixth-round pick.
- September 30: Philadelphia traded S Johnathan Cyprien and a 2020 seventh-round pick to Atlanta for LB Duke Riley and a 2020 sixth-round pick.
- October 7: Buffalo traded WR Zay Jones to Oakland to for a 2021 fifth-round pick.
- October 15: The Los Angeles Rams traded CB Marcus Peters to Baltimore for LB Kenny Young and a 2020 fifth-round pick.
- October 15: The Los Angeles Rams traded a 2020 first-round pick, a 2021 first-round pick and a 2021 fourth-round pick to Jacksonville for CB Jalen Ramsey.
- October 21: Oakland traded CB Gareon Conley to Houston for a 2020 third-round pick.
- October 22: New England traded a 2020 second-round pick to Atlanta for WR Mohamed Sanu.
- October 22: Denver traded WR Emmanuel Sanders and a 2020 fifth-round pick to San Francisco for a 2020 third-round pick and a 2020 fourth-round pick.
- October 24: New England traded DE Michael Bennett to Dallas for a 2021 seventh-round pick that may turn into a sixth-round pick.
- October 28: The New York Jets traded DL Leonard Williams to the New York Giants for a 2020 third-round pick and a condition 2021 fifth-round pick.
- October 28: Cleveland traded DE Genard Avery to Philadelphia for 2021 fourth-round pick.
- October 29: The Los Angeles Rams traded CB Aqib Talib and a 2020 fifth-round pick to Miami for a 2022 seventh-round pick.

=== Notable retirements ===
The following notable players retired prior to the 2019 season:

- LB NaVorro Bowman – Three-time Pro Bowler and four-time first-team All-Pro. Played for San Francisco and Oakland during his eight-year career.
- RB Jamaal Charles – Four-time Pro Bowler and three-time All-Pro (two first-team, one second-team). Played for Kansas City, Denver, and Jacksonville during his 11-year career.
- LB Derrick Johnson – Four-time Pro Bowl Selection and two-time All Pro (one first-team, one second-team). Played for Kansas City and Oakland during his 14-year career.
- TE Rob Gronkowski – Five-time Pro Bowler, four-time first-team All-Pro, three-time Super Bowl champion (XLIX, LI, and LIII), and 2014 Comeback Player of the Year. Played for New England during his entire nine-year career. Later came out of retirement in 2020 and was traded to the Tampa Bay Buccaneers, where he became a Super Bowl champion for a fourth time in his first season with the team.
- P Shane Lechler – Seven-time Pro Bowler and nine-time All-Pro (six first-team, three second-team). Played for Oakland and Houston during his 18-year career.
- QB Andrew Luck – Four-time Pro Bowler, first overall selection in the 2012 NFL draft, and 2018 Comeback Player of the Year. Played for Indianapolis during his entire seven-year career.
- DT Haloti Ngata – Five-time Pro Bowler, five-time All-Pro (two first-team, three second-team) and Super Bowl XLVII champion. Played for Baltimore, Detroit, and Philadelphia during his 13-year career.
- LB Brian Orakpo – Four-time Pro Bowler. Played for Washington and Tennessee during his 10-year career.
- DE Julius Peppers – Nine-time Pro Bowler, six-time All-Pro (three first-team, three second-team), and 2002 Defensive Rookie of the Year. Played for Carolina, Chicago, and Green Bay during his 17-year career.
- G Josh Sitton – Four-time Pro Bowler, three-time All-Pro (one first-team, two second-team) and Super Bowl XLV champion. Played for Green Bay, Chicago, and Miami during his 11-year career.
- DT Kyle Williams – Six-time Pro Bowler and two-time first-team All-Pro. Played for Buffalo during his entire 13-year career.

==== Other retirements ====
- Derek Anderson
- Doug Baldwin
- Clint Boling
- Rafael Bush
- Chandler Catanzaro
- Vontae Davis
- Phil Dawson
- Sebastian Janikowski
- Adam Jones
- T. J. Lang
- Andy Levitre
- Chris Long
- Jeremy Maclin
- EJ Manuel
- Rishard Matthews
- Zach Miller
- Derrick Morgan
- Jordy Nelson
- Brock Osweiler
- Niles Paul
- Glover Quin
- Brian Robison
- Mark Sanchez
- Matt Slauson
- Telvin Smith
- Torrey Smith
- Jonathan Stewart
- Travis Swanson
- Max Unger
- Charcandrick West

=== Draft ===
The 2019 NFL draft was held from April 25–27 in Nashville, Tennessee. The Arizona Cardinals selected Oklahoma quarterback Kyler Murray with the first overall selection.

== Officiating changes ==
- Walt Coleman III retired: With 30 seasons as an NFL official, Coleman was the longest-tenured. Former NFL Europe referee Adrian Hill, a longtime official in various positions, replaced Coleman.
- Pete Morelli: Morelli retired after having spent 22 seasons as an NFL official. Scott Novak, one of the Big 12 Conference's most decorated referees, succeeded Morelli.
- John Parry retired after being the referee in Super Bowl LIII to join the Monday Night Football booth as a rules analyst. He had spent 19 seasons as an official and 12 as a head referee. Brad Rogers, a field judge for the past two seasons who was previously a referee in Conference USA and the Southeastern Conference, succeeded Parry. Combined with the 2018 offseason retirements of Ed Hochuli, Terry McAulay, Gene Steratore and Jeff Triplette, the league was forced to replace seven of its 17 referee positions within a two-year period. In July 2019, the NFL announced that all of the league's officials would return to part-time status. For the previous two seasons, under a pilot program, a small number of NFL officials were classified as full-time employees of the NFL.

The following officials were hired:

- Roddy Ames (Replay Official)
- Saleem Choudhry (Replay Official)
- Terry Killens (Umpire)
- Patrick Holt (Down Judge)
- Matthew Sumstine (Replay Official)
- Tripp Sutter (Line Judge)
- Nate Jones (Field Judge)
- Dave Hawkshaw (Side Judge)
- Jimmy Russell (Side Judge)

The following official retired:

- Walt Coleman (Referee)
- John Parry (Referee)
- Pete Morelli (Referee)
- Steve Stelljes (Down Judge)
- Hugo Cruz (Down Judge) fired mid-season

== Rule changes ==
The following rule changes were approved for the 2019 season at the NFL owners' meeting on March 26:

- Make permanent the experimental kickoff rules from the 2018 season.
- Abolish all blindside blocks anywhere on the field (personal foul, 15 yards).
- As a one-year experiment, make the following plays reviewable, subject to coaches' challenges outside of the final 2:00 of each half, and subject to booth review after the two-minute warning of each half or entire overtime:
  - Pass interference, whether called or not (modified in June 2019)
  - Scoring plays and turnovers negated by penalties.
  - Any extra point or two-point conversion attempt.
- Change how double fouls are enforced after a change in possession; the last team to possess retains the ball at the spot of enforcement. If the enforcement spot is after a touchback, the ball is placed at the 20-yard line (after punt or turnover) or 25-yard line (free kick). If the spot of enforcement is in the end zone, the ball is placed at the 1-yard line.
- Make scrimmage kick rules apply if a missed field goal is touched in the end zone before hitting the ground, and if the ball is touched by either team behind the line of scrimmage.
- Allow teams to enforce a personal foul or unsportsmanlike conduct penalty committed during a touchdown on either the try or on the ensuing kickoff. Previously, these fouls were required to be enforced on the ensuing kickoff.
- Individuals not in uniform who enter the field to celebrate a play will draw an unsportsmanlike conduct penalty (15 yards, and automatic first down if on the defensive team).
- Players who make any flagrant "football" play risk immediate disqualification. Previously, this was limited to players who make a flagrant "non-football" play.

An additional rule change was built upon a rule originally passed in 2018. The NFL limited helmets to a list of 34 league-approved models, up from the 23 originally approved in 2018. The grandfather clause allowing existing players to wear their previous non-approved helmets expired, and 32 players were required to change helmets. In May 2019, the NFL banned Oklahoma drills, "bull in the ring", and other high-contact drills from team practices. In June 2019, the league clarified March 2019 temporary rule change regarding reviews of pass interference plays as follows:

- The initial rule passed in March 2019 regarding review of pass interference stays.
- A ruling will only be changed if there is clear and obvious evidence that pass interference did or did not occur (as is the standard for any other replay review).
- All pass plays are subject to review for pass interference, including the "Hail Mary" play.

== 2019 deaths ==
=== Members of the Pro Football Hall of Fame ===
Pat Bowlen
Bowlen owned the Denver Broncos since 1984. His Broncos won three Super Bowls during his tenure (XXXII, XXXIII and 50). He was inducted in 2019 but died from complications of Alzheimer's disease at the age of 75 on June 13, before the induction ceremonies. The team is now owned by.a consortium, led by former Walmart chairman Rob Walton, known as the Walton-Penner Family Ownership Group, who bought the team before the team before the 2022 season.

Cliff Branch
Branch was a wide receiver who played for the Oakland/Los Angeles Raiders from 1972 to 1986. 3-Time Super bowl champion (XI, XV, XVIII), 4-time pro bowl, and 3-time first team all pro. He was inducted into the Pro Football Hall of Fame in 2022. He died August 3, aged 71.

Willie Brown
Brown spent his first four seasons with the Denver Broncos (1963–1966) and his last twelve with Oakland Raiders (1967–1978), winning Super Bowl XI with the Raiders. Brown was also a nine-time Pro Bowler and was enshrined into the Pro Football Hall of Fame in 1984. He died on October 22 at the age of 78.

Nick Buoniconti
Buoniconti, inducted into the Hall of Fame in 2001, was an eight-time Pro Bowl linebacker who played seven seasons with the Boston Patriots from 1962 to 1968 and seven more with the Miami Dolphins from 1969 to 1974 and 1976. He won two Super Bowls with the Dolphins in 1972 and 1973. Buoniconti died on July 30 at the age of 78.

Forrest Gregg
Gregg, a guard, spent all but the final season of his playing career with the Green Bay Packers, a member of the Packers' 1960s dynasty. In his final year, he helped the Dallas Cowboys team win Super Bowl VI. Gregg was inducted into the Hall of Fame in 1977, his first year of eligibility. He also had a less illustrious coaching career in the NFL, college football and the Canadian Football League in the late 1970s, 1980s and into the 1990s, most successfully leading the 1981 Cincinnati Bengals to an AFC championship and a loss in Super Bowl XVI to the San Francisco 49ers. Gregg died on April 12 at the age of 85.

Jim Langer
Langer, who played center for 11 NFL seasons, nine with the Miami Dolphins alongside Buoniconti (with the team earning its perfect season during his rookie year) and two with the Minnesota Vikings, was inducted into the Hall of Fame in 1987. He died on August 29 at the age of 71.

Gino Marchetti
Marchetti was a defensive end who played 14 seasons in the NFL, 13 with the Baltimore Colts. Marchetti won two NFL championships, was selected to 11 Pro Bowls and made earned first-team All-Pro designations with the Colts. He was inducted into the Hall of Fame in 1972. Marchetti died on April 29 at the age of 93.

Bart Starr
Starr played quarterback for the Green Bay Packers during his entire 16-year career (1956–1971) and was the team's undisputed starter for the last 12 of those seasons. He was the Packers' starting quarterback for all five of the NFL championships the team won in the 1960s and was the Most Valuable Player of the first two World Championship Games. He also had a nine-season run as the Packers' head coach from 1975 to 1983, but only two of the nine were winning seasons (one of those, 1982, was shortened by a strike, and was also Starr's only playoff appearance as a coach). Starr was inducted into the Hall of Fame in 1977. He died on May 26 at the age of 85.

=== Team owners ===
Bill Bidwill
Bidwill was the owner of the Arizona Cardinals since the 1960s. He died on October 2 at the age of 88. The Bidwill family has been associated with the Cardinals since Bidwill's father Charles bought the team in 1933. His son Michael is expected to succeed his father as team owner.

Barron Hilton
Hilton was the original owner of the Los Angeles Chargers from 1960 to 1966. He was the last living member of the original Foolish Club, the group of owners who established the American Football League (Hilton divested in 1966; second- and third-generation heirs of two members, Kenneth S. Adams, Jr. (daughters and grandsons) and Lamar Hunt (son), continue to operate their clubs).

=== Others ===
- George Atkinson III
- Neiron Ball
- Barry Bennett
- Zeke Bratkowski
- Cedric Benson
- Al Carmichael
- Red Cashion
- Howard Cassady
- Reggie Cobb
- Mike Cofer
- Fred Cox
- Gunther Cunningham
- Jack Dolbin
- Darryl Drake
- Elbert "Golden Wheels" DuBenion
- Willie Ellison
- Rick Forzano
- Bob Fouts
- Larry Garron
- Anthony "Bubba" Green
- Cedrick Hardman
- Chuck Heberling
- Rusty Hilger
- E.J. Holub
- Vaughan Johnson
- Bob Kuechenberg
- Kwamie Lassiter
- Jim LeClair
- Keith Lincoln
- Jared Lorenzen
- Walt Michaels
- John Michels
- Eric Moss
- Bill Nelsen
- Eric Patterson
- Mitch Petrus
- John Ralston
- Charles Rogers
- Turk Schonert
- Yusuf Scott
- Jevan Snead
- Dick Tomey
- Wade Wilson
- Willie Wood
- Bob Zeman

== Preseason ==
Training camps for the 2019 season were held in late July through August. Teams started training camp no earlier than 15 days before their first scheduled preseason game. The Pro Football Hall of Fame Game was played on August 1; in which Denver defeated Atlanta at Tom Benson Hall of Fame Stadium in Canton, Ohio. Denver was represented in the 2019 Hall of Fame class by owner Pat Bowlen (posthumously) and former cornerback Champ Bailey, while Atlanta was represented by former tight end Tony Gonzalez.

On August 17, Dallas and the Los Angeles Rams played a preseason game at Aloha Stadium in Honolulu, Hawaii, the former home of the Pro Bowl.

On August 22, Oakland played Green Bay at IG Field in Winnipeg, home of the CFL's Winnipeg Blue Bombers; it was the first NFL game on Canadian soil since the end of the Bills Toronto Series in 2013. Mosaic Stadium in Regina, Saskatchewan, was another potential site for the game, and the teams had secured the cooperation of the city and local sports promoter On Ice Management, but the Saskatchewan Roughriders of the Canadian Football League (CFL) vetoed the proposal, as the Roughriders feared they would be unable to reconfigure the field from NFL to CFL standards in time for their August 24 home game (the CFL's Winnipeg Blue Bombers were away that weekend and thus did not have a scheduling conflict). Because of safety concerns caused by the reconfiguration of the goalposts, the NFL, at the last minute, shortened the playing field to 80 yards long (the first such known NFL usage of a field that short since 1932) and eliminated kickoffs, starting all possessions on the 15-yard line. Thirty-three Packers players refused to play on the surface, including starting quarterback Aaron Rodgers.

== NFL centennial promotions ==
On October 18, 2018, the NFL announced that it would commemorate its 100th season throughout 2019, beginning with Super Bowl LIII in February 2019. An NFL 100 emblem was featured in promotions across all NFL properties during the season, worn on jerseys as a patch, placed on game balls, and painted on fields.

The Chicago Bears (who, as the Decatur Staleys, were one of the 14 charter members of the league) celebrated their centennial season with commemorative events throughout 2019. On November 15, 2018, the team unveiled a customized version of the league-wide centennial emblem (which was worn on jerseys in place of the NFL-branded version). The team also unveiled a throwback jersey based on its 1936 design, which it donned for two games.

The NFL aired a special two-minute commercial during Super Bowl LIII to launch the centennial campaign, which featured a gala dinner attended by 40 current and former NFL players, including Los Angeles Rams RB Todd Gurley, then-New York Giants WR Odell Beckham Jr., New England QB Tom Brady, former Indianapolis and Denver QB Peyton Manning, Hall of Fame WRs Jerry Rice and Michael Irvin, and Hall of Fame QB Terry Bradshaw, NFL commissioner Roger Goodell (who delivered the welcome address), NFL officials Ron Torbert and Sarah Thomas, viral teenage girl football star Samantha Gordon, and video game streamer Tyler "Ninja" Blevins. The commercial won the annual Super Bowl Ad Meter survey held by USA Today, marking the first time that the NFL itself won.

In honor of the site of the first NFL game, the league announced plans to donate a new artificial turf field to Triangle Park in Dayton, Ohio, home field of the former Dayton Triangles, intending for Cincinnati to hold a day of training camp at the site. However, the project was rejected by the city after concerns that construction could potentially disturb a Native American burial site. The NFL instead donated the turf to nearby Kettering Field. The Bengals still held a training camp day in Dayton, doing so at Welcome Stadium instead.

The NFL intentionally scheduled a weekly game to honor landmark moments in NFL history:

Week	Result				Significance
1	Green Bay	10	Chicago	3	NFL's longest-running rivalry
2	Cleveland	23	New York Jets	3	First game televised on Monday Night Football; the series also celebrated its 50th season in 2019.
3	Miami	6	Dallas	31	Super Bowl VI
4	Los Angeles Chargers	30	Miami	10	Epic in Miami
5	Buffalo	14	Tennessee	7	Music City Miracle
6	New York Giants	14	New England	35	Super Bowls XLII (David Tyree's helmet catch that spoiled the first perfect season since 1972) and XLVI
7	Oakland	24	Green Bay	42	Super Bowl II
8	Green Bay	31	Kansas City	24	Super Bowl I
9	Minnesota	23	Kansas City	26	Super Bowl IV
10	Atlanta	26	New Orleans	9	Rivalry game and Saints' return to New Orleans following Hurricane Katrina
11	New England	17	Philadelphia	10	Super Bowls XXXIX and LII (Philly Special)
12	Oakland	3	New York Jets	34	Heidi Game
13	San Francisco	17	Baltimore	20	Super Bowl XLVII
14	Cincinnati	19	Cleveland	27	Battle of Ohio (state where NFL was founded), both teams founded by Paul Brown
15	Indianapolis	7	New Orleans	34	Super Bowl XLIV
16	Oakland	24	Los Angeles Chargers	17	Rivalry game, Holy Roller play
17	San Francisco	26	Seattle	21	Rivalry game, 2013 NFC Championship (The Tip)

== Regular season ==
The 2019 regular season's 256 games were played over a 17-week schedule that began on September 5, 2019. Each of the league's 32 teams played a 16-game schedule, with one bye week for each team. There were games on Monday nights and on Thursdays, including the National Football League Kickoff game and games on Thanksgiving Day. The regular season concluded with a full slate of 16 games on December 29, all of which were intra-division matchups, as it had been since 2010.

=== Scheduling formula ===
Under the NFL's current scheduling formula, each team played the other three teams in its own division twice. In addition, teams played against all four teams in one other division from each conference. The final two games on a team's schedule were against the two remaining teams in the same conference that had finished in the same position in their respective divisions in 2018 (e.g., the team that finished fourth in its division played all three other teams in the conference that also finished fourth). The division parings for 2019 were as follows:

Intra-conference
AFC East vs AFC North
AFC West vs AFC South
NFC East vs NFC North
NFC West vs NFC South

Inter-conference
AFC East vs NFC East
AFC North vs NFC West
AFC South vs NFC South
AFC West vs NFC North

The entire schedule was released on April 17, 2019.

Highlights of the 2019 season included:

- NFL Kickoff Game: The Kickoff Game was played September 5. Chicago hosted Green Bay in honor of the Bears' and the NFL's centennial season, a game announced on March 25 ahead of the rest of the schedule. Green Bay won the game, 10–3. The move broke with the league tradition to give the defending Super Bowl champion the hosting rights to the first game of the season; New England instead hosted the first Sunday Night Football game against Pittsburgh, which New England won 33–3.
- NFL International Series: Five games were held outside the United States in 2019. In addition to Jacksonville and the three teams who hosted an annual game abroad as part of their relocation agreements (the Los Angeles Chargers, Los Angeles Rams, and Oakland), Tampa Bay also hosted a home game abroad in 2019 as part of their agreement to host Super Bowl LV in 2021.
  - NFL London Games: Four games were played in London in 2019: Oakland hosted and defeated Chicago on October 6 and Tampa Bay hosted and lost to Carolina on October 13, both at Tottenham Hotspur Stadium. The Los Angeles Rams hosted and defeated Cincinnati on October 27 and Jacksonville hosted and lost to the Houston on November 3, both at Wembley Stadium. Houston and Carolina both made their first trip to London, leaving Green Bay as the only NFL team to have not played a game in London.
  - NFL Mexico Game: The Los Angeles Chargers hosted and lost to Kansas City at Estadio Azteca in Mexico City on November 18.
- Thanksgiving Day: As has been the case since 2006, three games were played on Thanksgiving Day, November 28, including the traditional afternoon doubleheader hosted by Detroit (defeated by the Chicago for the second year in a row) and Dallas Cowboys (defeated by Buffalo). Atlanta hosted and lost to New Orleans in the night game; the two teams had played on Thanksgiving night in 2018 as well.

=== Scheduling changes ===
When the entire season schedule was released on April 17, the league announced Saturday games to be played in Week 16. On November 12, the NFL announced that three games would be moved from Sunday to Saturday

- Week 8: The Oakland–Houston game was moved from 1:00 p.m. ET to 4:25 p.m. ET, trading time slots with the Denver–Indianapolis game; both games remained on CBS.
- Week 10: The Carolina–Green Bay game was moved from 1:00 p.m. ET to 4:25 p.m. ET; game remained on Fox.
- Week 11: The New York Jets–Washington game was cross-flexed from CBS to Fox; game remained at 1:00 p.m. ET.
- Week 12: The Green Bay–San Francisco game, originally at 4:25 p.m ET on Fox, was flexed into the NBC Sunday Night Football 8:20 p.m. ET timeslot, replacing the originally scheduled Seattle–Philadelphia game, which was moved to 1:00 p.m. ET on Fox. In addition, the Carolina–New Orleans game was cross-flexed from Fox to CBS and the Miami–Cleveland game was cross-flexed from CBS to Fox; kickoff times for both games remained at 1:00 p.m. ET.
- Week 13: The Oakland–Kansas City game was moved from 1:00 p.m. ET to 4:25 p.m. ET, trading time slots with the Cleveland–Pittsburgh game; both games remained on CBS.
- Week 15: The Buffalo–Pittsburgh game, originally scheduled at 1:00 p.m ET on CBS, was flexed into the NBC Sunday Night Football 8:20 p.m. ET timeslot, replacing the originally scheduled Minnesota–Los Angeles Chargers game, which was moved to 4:05 p.m. on CBS.
- Week 16: Three games were moved to Saturday: Houston–Tampa Bay at 1:00 p.m. ET, Buffalo–New England at 4:30 p.m. ET, and Los Angeles Rams–San Francisco at 8:15 p.m. ET, all on the NFL Network. The two other games that the NFL had the option of moving (Detroit–Denver and Oakland–Los Angeles Chargers) remained on Sunday.
- Week 17: The San Francisco–Seattle game that was originally scheduled for 4:25 p.m. ET on Fox was selected as the final 8:20 p.m. ET NBC Sunday Night Football game of the season, which decided the NFC West champion. In addition, the following games with playoff implications were rescheduled from 1:00 p.m. ET to 4:25 p.m. ET (with networks in parentheses): Tennessee–Houston (CBS); Indianapolis-Jacksonville (CBS); Washington–Dallas (Fox); Philadelphia–New York Giants (Fox). The Cleveland–Cincinnati game was cross-flexed from CBS to Fox, but remained at 1:00 p.m. ET.

== Regular season standings ==
=== Division ===
AFC East
	W	L	T	PCT	DIV	CONF	PF	PA	STK
^{(3)} New England Patriots	12	4	0	.750	5–1	8–4	420	225	L1
^{(5)} Buffalo Bills	10	6	0	.625	3–3	7–5	314	259	L2
New York Jets	7	9	0	.438	2–4	4–8	276	359	W2
Miami Dolphins	5	11	0	.313	2–4	4–8	306	494	W2

AFC North
	W	L	T	PCT	DIV	CONF	PF	PA	STK
^{(1)} Baltimore Ravens	14	2	0	.875	5–1	10–2	531	282	W12
Pittsburgh Steelers	8	8	0	.500	3–3	6–6	289	303	L3
Cleveland Browns	6	10	0	.375	3–3	6–6	335	393	L3
Cincinnati Bengals	2	14	0	.125	1–5	2–10	279	420	W1

AFC South
	W	L	T	PCT	DIV	CONF	PF	PA	STK
^{(4)} Houston Texans	10	6	0	.625	4–2	8–4	378	385	L1
^{(6)} Tennessee Titans	9	7	0	.563	3–3	7–5	402	331	W1
Indianapolis Colts	7	9	0	.438	3–3	5–7	361	373	L1
Jacksonville Jaguars	6	10	0	.375	2–4	6–6	300	397	W1

AFC West
	W	L	T	PCT	DIV	CONF	PF	PA	STK
^{(2)} Kansas City Chiefs	12	4	0	.750	6–0	9–3	451	308	W6
Denver Broncos	7	9	0	.438	3–3	6–6	282	316	W2
Oakland Raiders	7	9	0	.438	3–3	5–7	313	419	L1
Los Angeles Chargers	5	11	0	.313	0–6	3–9	337	345	L3

NFC East
	W	L	T	PCT	DIV	CONF	PF	PA	STK
^{(4)} Philadelphia Eagles	9	7	0	.563	5–1	7–5	385	354	W4
Dallas Cowboys	8	8	0	.500	5–1	7–5	434	321	W1
New York Giants	4	12	0	.250	2–4	3–9	341	451	L1
Washington Redskins	3	13	0	.188	0–6	2–10	266	435	L4

NFC North
	W	L	T	PCT	DIV	CONF	PF	PA	STK
^{(2)} Green Bay Packers	13	3	0	.813	6–0	10–2	376	313	W5
^{(6)} Minnesota Vikings	10	6	0	.625	2–4	7–5	407	303	L2
Chicago Bears	8	8	0	.500	4–2	7–5	280	298	W1
Detroit Lions	3	12	1	.219	0–6	2–9–1	341	423	L9

NFC South
	W	L	T	PCT	DIV	CONF	PF	PA	STK
^{(3)} New Orleans Saints	13	3	0	.813	5–1	9–3	458	341	W3
Atlanta Falcons	7	9	0	.438	4–2	6–6	381	399	W4
Tampa Bay Buccaneers	7	9	0	.438	2–4	5–7	458	449	L2
Carolina Panthers	5	11	0	.313	1–5	2–10	340	470	L8

NFC West
	W	L	T	PCT	DIV	CONF	PF	PA	STK
^{(1)} San Francisco 49ers	13	3	0	.813	5–1	10–2	479	310	W2
^{(5)} Seattle Seahawks	11	5	0	.688	3–3	8–4	405	398	L2
Los Angeles Rams	9	7	0	.563	3–3	7–5	394	364	W1
Arizona Cardinals	5	10	1	.344	1–5	3–8–1	361	442	L1

=== Conference ===
AFC
#	Team	Division	W	L	T	PCT	DIV	CONF	SOS	SOV	STK
Division leaders
1	Baltimore Ravens	North	14	2	0	.875	5–1	10–2	.494	.484	W12
2 (Note: Kansas City claimed the No. 2 seed over New England based on head-to-head victory.)	Kansas City Chiefs	West	12	4	0	.750	6–0	9–3	.510	.477	W6
3	New England Patriots	East	12	4	0	.750	5–1	8–4	.469	.411	L1
4	Houston Texans	South	10	6	0	.625	4–2	8–4	.520	.488	L1
Wild Cards
5	Buffalo Bills	East	10	6	0	.625	3–3	7–5	.461	.363	L2
6	Tennessee Titans	South	9	7	0	.563	3–3	7–5	.488	.465	W1
Did not qualify for the postseason
7	Pittsburgh Steelers	North	8	8	0	.500	3–3	6–6	.502	.324	L3
8 (Note: Denver finished ahead of Indianapolis and NY Jets based on conference record. Division tiebreak was initially used to eliminate Oakland (see below).) (Note: Denver finished ahead of Oakland based on conference record.)	Denver Broncos	West	7	9	0	.438	3–3	6–6	.510	.406	W2
9 (Note: Oakland and Indianapolis finished ahead of NY Jets based on conference record.) (Note: Oakland finished ahead of Indianapolis based on head-to-head victory.)	Oakland Raiders	West	7	9	0	.438	3–3	5–7	.482	.335	L1
10	Indianapolis Colts	South	7	9	0	.438	3–3	5–7	.492	.500	L1
11	New York Jets	East	7	9	0	.438	2–4	4–8	.473	.402	W2
12 (Note: Jacksonville finished ahead of Cleveland based on record against common opponents. Jacksonville's cumulative record against Cincinnati, Denver, NY Jets, and Tennessee was 4–1, compared to Cleveland's 2–3 cumulative record against the same four teams.)	Jacksonville Jaguars	South	6	10	0	.375	2–4	6–6	.484	.406	W1
13	Cleveland Browns	North	6	10	0	.375	3–3	6–6	.533	.479	L3
14 (Note: LA Chargers finished ahead of Miami based on head-to-head victory.)	Los Angeles Chargers	West	5	11	0	.313	0–6	3–9	.514	.488	L3
15	Miami Dolphins	East	5	11	0	.313	2–4	4–8	.484	.463	W2
16	Cincinnati Bengals	North	2	14	0	.125	1–5	2–10	.553	.406	W1
Tiebreakers (Note: When breaking ties for three or more teams under the NFL's rules, they are first broken within divisions, then comparing only the highest ranked remaining team from each division.)

NFC
#	Team	Division	W	L	T	PCT	DIV	CONF	SOS	SOV	STK
Division leaders
1 (Note: San Francisco finished ahead of Green Bay and New Orleans based on head-to-head sweep, claiming the No. 1 seed.)	San Francisco 49ers	West	13	3	0	.813	5–1	10–2	.504	.466	W2
2 (Note: Green Bay claimed the No. 2 seed over New Orleans based on conference record.)	Green Bay Packers	North	13	3	0	.813	6–0	10–2	.453	.428	W5
3	New Orleans Saints	South	13	3	0	.813	5–1	9–3	.486	.459	W3
4	Philadelphia Eagles	East	9	7	0	.563	5–1	7–5	.455	.417	W4
Wild Cards
5	Seattle Seahawks	West	11	5	0	.688	3–3	8–4	.531	.463	L2
6	Minnesota Vikings	North	10	6	0	.625	2–4	7–5	.477	.356	L2
Did not qualify for the postseason
7	Los Angeles Rams	West	9	7	0	.563	3–3	7–5	.535	.438	W1
8 (Note: Chicago finished ahead of Dallas based on head-to-head victory.)	Chicago Bears	North	8	8	0	.500	4–2	7–5	.508	.383	W1
9	Dallas Cowboys	East	8	8	0	.500	5–1	7–5	.479	.316	W1
10 (Note: Atlanta finished ahead of Tampa Bay based on division record.)	Atlanta Falcons	South	7	9	0	.438	4–2	6–6	.545	.518	W4
11	Tampa Bay Buccaneers	South	7	9	0	.438	2–4	5–7	.500	.384	L2
12	Arizona Cardinals	West	5	10	1	.344	1–5	3–8–1	.529	.375	L1
13	Carolina Panthers	South	5	11	0	.313	1–5	2–10	.549	.469	L8
14	New York Giants	East	4	12	0	.250	2–4	3–9	.473	.281	L1
15	Detroit Lions	North	3	12	1	.219	0–6	2–9–1	.506	.375	L9
16	Washington Redskins	East	3	13	0	.188	0–6	2–10	.502	.281	L4
Tiebreakers (Note: When breaking ties for three or more teams under the NFL's rules, they are first broken within divisions, then comparing only the highest-ranked remaining team from each division.)

== Postseason ==
The 2019 playoffs began on January 4–5, 2020 with the wild-card round. The four winners of these games visited the top two seeds in each conference in the Divisional Round games on January 11–12. The winners of those games advanced to the Conference Championships on January 19. The 2020 Pro Bowl was played at Camping World Stadium in Orlando on January 26. Super Bowl LIV was played at Hard Rock Stadium in Miami on February 2.

The start times for the Divisional Round games on Sunday, January 12, were moved to 3:00 p.m. and 6:30 p.m. ET (as is already the case with the conference championship games), rather than the typical 1:00 p.m. and 4:30 p.m. windows used for this round in previous seasons.

This was the final season under the 12-team playoff bracket.

=== Bracket ===
Jan 5 – Lincoln Financial Field	Jan 12 – Lambeau Field
5	Seattle	17
5	Seattle	23
4	Philadelphia	9	Jan 19 – Levi's Stadium
2	Green Bay	28
NFC
Jan 5 – Mercedes-Benz Superdome	2	Green Bay	20
Jan 11 – Levi's Stadium
1	San Francisco	37
6	Minnesota	26*	NFC Championship
6	Minnesota	10
3	New Orleans	20	Feb 2 – Hard Rock Stadium
1	San Francisco	27
Wild-card round
Divisional round
Jan 4 – Gillette Stadium	N1	San Francisco	20
Jan 11 – M&T Bank Stadium
A2	Kansas City	31
6	Tennessee	20	Super Bowl LIV
6	Tennessee	28
3	New England	13	Jan 19 – Arrowhead Stadium
1	Baltimore	12
AFC
Jan 4 – NRG Stadium	6	Tennessee	24
Jan 12 – Arrowhead Stadium
2	Kansas City	35
5	Buffalo	19	AFC Championship
4	Houston	31
4	Houston	22*
2	Kansas City	51

* Indicates overtime victory

== Notable events ==
=== Andrew Luck's retirement ===
News of Indianapolis Colts quarterback and 2012 first overall pick Andrew Luck retiring broke out during the Colts' third preseason game. His retirement quickly became one of the most surprising revelations of the year. During his post-game press conference, Luck stated that his retirement was due to the recent mental and physical difficulties of playing football. Luck had won the NFL Comeback Player of the Year Award in 2018.

=== Antonio Brown controversies ===
Wide receiver Antonio Brown was involved in several controversies throughout the off-season, preseason, and regular season. Brown was held out by his former team, the Pittsburgh Steelers during week 17 of 2018 due to a heated falling out with quarterback Ben Roethlisberger. He was subsequently traded to the Oakland Raiders in March 2019. However, Brown's helmet model had been banned by the NFL due to inadequate protection, prompting Brown to hold out of practices and file two grievances against the NFL, both of which were denied. Brown then accepted the new helmet model and returned to practice, but later wore inadequate footwear in a cryogenic chamber and got frostbite on his feet, causing additional concern for his availability in Week 1. Brown next released recorded audio of Raiders head coach Jon Gruden and requested that the Raiders release him. He was subsequently released and signed with the New England Patriots. On September 10, allegations that Brown had raped his former trainer, Britney Taylor, caused speculation that he might be put on the commissioner's exempt list, barring him from playing. However, the NFL did not do so and Brown played in the Patriots' Week 2 game. On September 16, a second woman accused Brown of sexual misconduct. That same day, Pittsburgh-based Dr. Victor Prisk, who worked with Brown during his time with the Steelers, sued Brown for $11,500 in unpaid fees. The Patriots cut Brown on September 20 after he allegedly sent intimidating text messages to his second accuser.

=== Steelers–Browns brawl ===
In the final seconds of a November 14 Thursday Night Football matchup between the Pittsburgh Steelers and Cleveland Browns, Browns defensive end Myles Garrett tackled Steelers quarterback Mason Rudolph after Rudolph completed a screen pass to running back Trey Edmunds. Upset by the late tackle, Rudolph attacked Garrett by attempting to pull off Garrett's helmet. Garrett then ripped off Rudolph's helmet and used it to hit Rudolph in the head while being restrained by Steelers center Maurkice Pouncey and Steelers guard David DeCastro. Pouncey and Browns defensive tackle Larry Ogunjobi then joined in on the fight, with Pouncey punching and kicking Garrett's head several times. Garrett, Ogunjobi, and Pouncey were all ejected from the game. Following the game, Garrett was suspended for the remainder of 2019 and required to apply for reinstatement in 2020, while Pouncey and Ogunjobi received 2-game and 1-game suspensions, respectively. Garrett was reinstated in February 2020, ending his suspension after six games. The six-game suspension was the longest in NFL history for a single on-field transgression.

=== Patriots videotaping controversy ===
During the December 8 game between the Cincinnati Bengals and Cleveland Browns, the New England Patriots were alleged to have spied on the Bengals' sideline. The Patriots, who were scheduled to play the Bengals the following week, sent a video team to Cleveland to film a documentary of an advance scout, part of the "Do Your Job" series on the Patriots' website. This video contractor was given media credentials by the Browns, but the Bengals and NFL were not made aware of the presence of the Patriots' video crew. According to ESPN's Dianna Russini, a Bengals staffer spotted the Patriots' cameraman and proceeded to observe what he was doing. Allegedly, the cameraman proceeded to point his camera at the Bengals coaching staff and sideline for most of the quarter. The Bengals employee reported him to media relations, who reported him to security; security then seized the film and leaked it to Jay Glazer, who made the footage public. The NFL has launched an investigation into these allegations. This was the second time the current Patriots administration was involved in an unauthorized videotaping scandal, following the Spygate controversy in 2007.

== Records, milestones, and notable statistics ==
Week 1

- The Baltimore Ravens scored 42 points in the first half against the Miami Dolphins, setting an NFL record for most points in the first half of a season opener.

Week 2

- Matt Ryan became the 12th player to throw 300 career touchdown passes
- Adrian Peterson passed Jim Brown for fifth place on the all-time rushing touchdowns list.
- JuJu Smith-Schuster became the youngest player in NFL history to record 2,500 career receiving yards, at the age of 22 years, 297 days, a record previously held by Randy Moss, who was 22 years, 310 days old.

Week 4

- Frank Gore became the fourth player in NFL history to rush for 15,000 yards.
- Larry Fitzgerald caught his 1,326th reception, moving into second place all-time, behind Jerry Rice.
- Von Miller recorded his 100th career sack, becoming the fourth-fastest player to do so (124 games).
- Jared Goff set the record for most completions in regulation of a regular season game, with 45. The previous record of 44 was set by Ben Roethlisberger.

Week 5

- Tom Brady passed Brett Favre for third place on the all-time passing yards list.

Week 6

- Tom Brady passed Peyton Manning for second place on the all-time passing yards list.
- Justin Tucker became the fastest player to score 1,000 career points, doing so in 118 games. The record was previously held by Stephen Gostkowski who reached 1,000 points in 119 games.

Week 7

- Matthew Stafford became the fastest player to throw for 40,000 yards, doing so in 147 games. The record was previously held by Matt Ryan, who reached 40,000 yards in 151 games.
- Aaron Rodgers became the fastest player to throw for 350 touchdowns, doing so in 172 games. The record was previously held by Drew Brees, who reached 350 touchdowns in 180 games.
- Brett Maher became the first kicker in NFL history to kick three field goals of at least 60 yards in his career.
- Marvin Jones became the first player in NFL history to score four receiving touchdowns in a game in which he did not have at least 100 receiving yards; he caught 10 passes for 93 yards and the four touchdowns.

Week 8

- Bill Belichick became the third head coach in NFL history to win 300 games (regular season and postseason), joining George Halas and Don Shula.
- Drew Brees became the first quarterback to pass for 75,000 yards.
- Andy Dalton started the season with an 0–8 record. Having previously started the 2015 season 8–0, Dalton became the first quarterback to start seasons 8–0 and 0–8 since the NFL officially kept quarterbacks' win–loss records in 1950.

Week 10

- Kyler Murray set the record for consecutive pass attempts by a rookie without an interception with 211, breaking the previous record of 176 shared by Derek Carr and Dak Prescott.
- Michael Thomas became the fastest player to reach 400 career receptions, doing so in 56 games.
- Lamar Jackson became the second player in NFL history to record two games with a perfect passer rating in the same season, joining Ben Roethlisberger who did so in 2007.

Week 11

- Adam Vinatieri recorded his 710th career field goal attempt, setting an NFL record. The previous record of 709 attempts was held by Morten Andersen.

Week 12

- Frank Gore passed Barry Sanders for third place on the all-time rushing yards list. He also moved to third on the all-time rushing attempts list.

Week 13

- Drew Brees became the second quarterback to record 10,000 career pass attempts.
- Tom Brady passed Brett Favre for second place on the all-time completions list.

Week 14

- Matt Ryan became the tenth quarterback to throw for over 50,000 career passing yards.
- Lamar Jackson became the second quarterback to run for 1,000 yards in a season, joining Michael Vick in 2006.
- Drew Lock became the first rookie quarterback to achieve at least 300 passing yards and three passing touchdowns in his first road start.

Week 15

- Lamar Jackson passed Michael Vick's single season record for rushing yards by a quarterback with 1,039.
- Drew Brees recorded his 540th career touchdown pass, setting an NFL record. The previous record of 539 was held by Peyton Manning.
- Brees also set the record for highest completion percentage in a game (minimum 20 attempts) at 96.7% (29 of 30). The previous record of 96.6% was held by Philip Rivers.
- Julio Jones set the record for most career receiving yards through a players first nine seasons, with 11,881. The previous record of 11,864 was held by Torry Holt.

Week 16

- Michael Thomas set the new single-season record for most receptions in a season (ultimately 149), passing Marvin Harrison's previous mark of 143.

Week 17

- Tom Brady passed Peyton Manning for second place on the all-time passing touchdowns list.
- The Baltimore Ravens set the NFL record for most rushing yards in a season with 3,296. The previous record of 3,165 yards was held by the 1978 New England Patriots.
- The Ravens became the first team in NFL history to average 200 passing yards and 200 rushing yards per game.
- The Atlanta Falcons set the NFL record for shortest overtime game, finishing the game seven seconds into overtime. The previous record was 11 seconds in a 2011 playoff game.
- Christian McCaffrey became the third player with 1,000 rushing yards and 1,000 receiving yards in the same season, joining Roger Craig and Marshall Faulk.
- Jameis Winston became the first player to throw for at least 30 touchdowns and 30 interceptions in the same season.
- Carson Wentz became the first player to throw for 4,000 passing yards in a season while having no wide receiver reach 500 receiving yards.
- Adrian Peterson passed Edgerrin James for eighth place on the all-time rushing attempts list.

Wild-card round

- The New Orleans Saints became the first team in NFL history to win at least 13 games in a 16-game schedule and get eliminated in the wild-card round.
- The Saints became the second team to be eliminated from the postseason on their final play of the game in three straight years, joining the 2013–15 Green Bay Packers.

Divisional round

- Ryan Tannehill became the second quarterback to win consecutive playoff starts in which he threw for fewer than 100 passing yards and at least one touchdown, joining Terry Bradshaw, who did so in 1974.
- Derrick Henry became the first player in NFL history to have two games of 180 rushing yards in the same postseason.
- The Tennessee Titans became the second team to win a postseason game, despite being outgained by at least 200 yards, joining the 2009 New Orleans Saints.
- Lamar Jackson became the first player to have 300 passing yards and 140 rushing yards in any game, regular season or postseason.

Conference championships

- Raheem Mostert became the first player in NFL history to rush for at least 200 yards and four touchdowns in a playoff game.
- Mostert became the first player to rush for 150 yards and three touchdowns in a single half of a playoff game, doing so in the first half.
- Mostert's 248 rushing yards set the record for most rushing yards in a conference championship game. The previous record of 206 was held by Keith Lincoln.

Super Bowl

- Kyle Shanahan joined his father Mike Shanahan as the first father-son duo to lead their teams to a Super Bowl as head coaches. The elder Shanahan previously coached the Denver Broncos in Super Bowls XXXII and XXXIII.
- Deebo Samuel rushed for 53 yards, setting the Super Bowl record for most rushing yards by a wide receiver. The previous record of 45 was held by Percy Harvin during Super Bowl XLVIII.

== Regular-season statistical leaders ==
Individual
Scoring leader	Harrison Butker, Kansas City (147)
Most field goals made	Harrison Butker, Kansas City (34)
Touchdowns	Aaron Jones, Green Bay and Christian McCaffrey, Carolina (19)
Rushing	Derrick Henry, Tennessee (1,540)
Passing yards	Jameis Winston, Tampa Bay (5,109)
Passing touchdowns	Lamar Jackson, Baltimore (36)
Passer rating	Ryan Tannehill, Tennessee (117.5)
Pass receptions	Michael Thomas, New Orleans (149)
Pass receiving yards	Michael Thomas, New Orleans (1,725)
Combined tackles	Bobby Wagner, Seattle (159 tackles)
Interceptions	Anthony Harris, Minnesota, Tre'Davious White, Buffalo and Stephon Gilmore, New England (6)
Punting	Lac Edwards, New York Jets (3,991 yards, 45.9 average yards)
Sacks	Shaquil Barrett, Tampa Bay (19.5)

== Awards ==
=== Individual season awards ===
The 9th NFL Honors, saluting the best players and plays from 2019 season, was held on February 1, 2020, at the Adrienne Arsht Center in Miami, Florida.

Award	Winner	Position	Team
AP Most Valuable Player	Lamar Jackson	QB	Baltimore Ravens
AP Offensive Player of the Year	Michael Thomas	WR	New Orleans Saints
AP Defensive Player of the Year	Stephon Gilmore	CB	New England Patriots
AP Coach of the Year	John Harbaugh	HC	Baltimore Ravens
AP Assistant Coach of the Year	Greg Roman	OC	Baltimore Ravens
AP Offensive Rookie of the Year	Kyler Murray	QB	Arizona Cardinals
AP Defensive Rookie of the Year	Nick Bosa	DE	San Francisco 49ers
AP Comeback Player of the Year	Ryan Tannehill	QB	Tennessee Titans
Pepsi Rookie of the Year	Nick Bosa	DE	San Francisco 49ers
Walter Payton NFL Man of the Year	Calais Campbell	DE	Jacksonville Jaguars
PFWA NFL Executive of the Year	John Lynch	GM	San Francisco 49ers
Super Bowl Most Valuable Player	Patrick Mahomes	QB	Kansas City Chiefs

=== All-Pro team ===
The following players were named First Team All-Pro by the Associated Press:

Offense
Quarterback	Lamar Jackson (Baltimore)
Running back	Christian McCaffrey (Carolina)
Flex	Christian McCaffrey (Carolina)
Wide receiver	Michael Thomas (New Orleans); DeAndre Hopkins (Houston)
Tight end	George Kittle (San Francisco)
Left tackle	Ronnie Stanley (Baltimore)
Left guard	Quenton Nelson (Indianapolis)
Center	Jason Kelce (Philadelphia)
Right guard	Zack Martin (Dallas)
Right tackle	Ryan Ramczyk (New Orleans)

Defense
Edge rusher	Chandler Jones (Arizona); T. J. Watt (Pittsburgh)
Interior lineman	Aaron Donald (Los Angeles Rams); Cam Heyward (Pittsburgh)
Linebacker	Bobby Wagner (Seattle); Demario Davis (New Orleans); Eric Kendricks (Minnesota)
Cornerback	Stephon Gilmore (New England); Tre'Davious White (Buffalo)
Safety	Jamal Adams (New York Jets); Minkah Fitzpatrick (Pittsburgh)

Special teams
Placekicker	Justin Tucker (Baltimore)
Punter	Brett Kern (Tennessee)
Kick returner	Cordarrelle Patterson (Chicago)
Special teams	Matthew Slater (New England)

=== Players of the week/month ===
The following were named the top performers during the 2019 season:

Week/ Month	Offensive Player of the Week/Month		Defensive Player of the Week/Month		Special Teams Player of the Week/Month	
Week/ Month	AFC	NFC	AFC	NFC	AFC	NFC
1	Lamar Jackson QB (Ravens)	Dak Prescott QB (Cowboys)	Cameron Wake OLB (Titans)	Anthony Harris SS (Vikings)	Ty Long P (Chargers)	Wil Lutz K (Saints)
2	Patrick Mahomes QB (Chiefs)	Russell Wilson QB (Seahawks)	Whitney Mercilus OLB (Texans)	Shaquil Barrett OLB (Buccaneers)	Jamie Gillan P (Browns)	Eddy Piñeiro K (Bears)
3	Deshaun Watson QB (Texans)	Daniel Jones QB (Giants)	Calais Campbell DE (Jaguars)	Preston Smith OLB (Packers)	Jake Bailey P (Patriots)	Thomas Morstead P (Saints)
4	Nick Chubb RB (Browns)	Jameis Winston QB (Buccaneers)	Kyle Van Noy LB (Patriots)	Janoris Jenkins CB (Giants)	Josh Lambo K (Jaguars)	Joey Slye K (Panthers)
Sept.	Patrick Mahomes QB (Chiefs)	Christian McCaffrey RB (Panthers)	Devin McCourty FS (Patriots)	Shaquil Barrett OLB (Buccaneers)	Jamie Gillan P (Browns)	Thomas Morstead P (Saints)
5	Deshaun Watson QB (Texans)	Aaron Jones RB (Packers)	Justin Houston DE (Colts)	Nick Bosa DE (49ers)	Justin Tucker K (Ravens)	Dan Bailey K (Vikings)
6	Sam Darnold QB (Jets)	Kyler Murray QB (Cardinals)	Devin Bush Jr. LB (Steelers)	Landon Collins SS (Redskins)	Justin Tucker K (Ravens)	Thomas Morstead P (Saints)
7	Jacoby Brissett QB (Colts)	Aaron Rodgers QB (Packers)	Tre'Davious White CB (Bills)	Chandler Jones OLB (Cardinals)	Josh Lambo K (Jaguars)	Brett Maher K (Cowboys)
8	James Conner RB (Steelers)	Aaron Jones RB (Packers)	Joey Bosa DE (Chargers)	Nick Bosa DE (49ers)	Adam Vinatieri K (Colts)	Dan Bailey K (Vikings)
Oct.	Deshaun Watson QB (Texans)	Kirk Cousins QB (Vikings)	Stephon Gilmore CB (Patriots)	Nick Bosa DE (49ers)	Justin Tucker K (Ravens)	Zane Gonzalez K (Cardinals)
9	Lamar Jackson QB (Ravens)	Russell Wilson QB (Seahawks)	Bud Dupree OLB (Steelers)	Xavier Woods FS (Cowboys)	Harrison Butker K (Chiefs)	Mitch Wishnowsky P (49ers)
10	Lamar Jackson QB (Ravens)	Dalvin Cook RB (Vikings)	Jamal Adams S (Jets)	Jadeveon Clowney DE (Seahawks)	Jason Sanders K (Dolphins)	Younghoe Koo K (Falcons)
11	Josh Allen QB (Bills)	Dak Prescott QB (Cowboys)	Maxx Crosby DE (Raiders)	Aaron Donald DT (Rams)	Jake Bailey P (Patriots)	Kenjon Barner RB (Falcons)
12	Lamar Jackson QB (Ravens)	Chris Godwin WR (Buccaneers)	Joe Schobert LB (Browns)	Fred Warner LB (49ers)	Matthew Slater WR (Patriots)	Steven Sims WR (Redskins)
13	Deshaun Watson QB (Texans)	Jared Goff QB (Rams)	Carlos Dunlap DE (Bengals)	Cameron Jordan DE (Saints)	Jason Sanders K (Dolphins)	Tress Way P (Redskins)
Nov.	Lamar Jackson QB (Ravens)	Michael Thomas WR (Saints)	T. J. Watt OLB (Steelers)	Fred Warner LB (49ers)	Harrison Butker K (Chiefs)	Cordarrelle Patterson WR (Bears)
14	Ryan Tannehill QB (Titans)	Jimmy Garoppolo QB (49ers)	Kareem Jackson SS (Broncos)	Danielle Hunter DE (Vikings)	Diontae Johnson WR (Steelers)	Younghoe Koo K (Falcons)
15	Lamar Jackson QB (Ravens)	Drew Brees QB (Saints)	Tre'Davious White CB (Bills)	Patrick Peterson CB (Cardinals)	Angelo Blackson DE (Texans)	Dan Bailey K (Vikings)
16	Ryan Fitzpatrick QB (Dolphins)	Saquon Barkley RB (Giants)	Dre'Mont Jones DE (Broncos)	Chandler Jones OLB (Cardinals)	Nyheim Hines RB (Colts)	Robbie Gould K (49ers)
17	Derrick Henry RB (Titans)	Boston Scott RB (Eagles)	Carlos Dunlap DE (Bengals)	Deion Jones LB (Falcons)	Mecole Hardman WR (Chiefs)	Johnny Hekker P (Rams)
Dec.	Ryan Tannehill QB (Titans)	Drew Brees QB (Saints)	Tyrann Mathieu SS (Chiefs)	Chandler Jones OLB (Cardinals)	Jason Sanders K (Dolphins)	Robbie Gould K (49ers)

Week	FedEx Air Player of the Week	FedEx Ground Player of the Week	Pepsi Rookie of the Week	Snickers Hungriest Player
1	Lamar Jackson (Baltimore)	Marlon Mack (Indianapolis)	Gardner Minshew QB (Jacksonville)	Marquise Brown WR (Baltimore)
2	Patrick Mahomes (Kansas City)	Dalvin Cook (Minnesota)	Chase Winovich DE (New England)	Eddy Piñeiro K (Chicago)
3	Patrick Mahomes (Kansas City)	Christian McCaffrey (Carolina)	Gardner Minshew QB (Jacksonville)	Cooper Kupp WR (LA Rams)
4	Jameis Winston (Tampa Bay)	Nick Chubb (Cleveland)	Gardner Minshew QB (Jacksonville)	Gardner Minshew QB (Jacksonville)
5	Deshaun Watson (Houston)	Aaron Jones (Green Bay)	Gardner Minshew QB (Jacksonville)	Will Fuller WR (Houston)
6	Kirk Cousins (Minnesota)	Lamar Jackson (Baltimore)	Kyler Murray QB (Arizona)	Stefon Diggs WR (Minnesota)
7	Aaron Rodgers (Green Bay)	Dalvin Cook (Minnesota)	Gardner Minshew QB (Jacksonville)	DeMarcus Lawrence DE (Dallas)
8	Aaron Rodgers (Green Bay)	Tevin Coleman (San Francisco)	Gardner Minshew QB (Jacksonville)	Tevin Coleman (San Francisco)
9	Russell Wilson (Seattle)	Christian McCaffrey (Carolina)	DK Metcalf WR (Seattle)	Tyler Lockett WR (Seattle)
10	Lamar Jackson (Baltimore)	Derrick Henry (Tennessee)	Josh Jacobs RB (Oakland)	not presented
11	Dak Prescott (Dallas)	Marlon Mack (Indianapolis)	Maxx Crosby DE (Oakland)	not presented
12	Lamar Jackson (Baltimore)	Derrick Henry (Tennessee)	Devin Singletary RB (Buffalo)	Chris Godwin WR (Tampa Bay)
13	Mitchell Trubisky (Chicago)	Derrick Henry (Tennessee)	Ed Oliver DT (Buffalo)	Taysom Hill QB (New Orleans)
14	Ryan Tannehill (Tennessee)	Derrick Henry (Tennessee)	Drew Lock QB (Denver)	Emmanuel Sanders (San Francisco)
15	Drew Brees (New Orleans)	Kenyan Drake (Arizona)	Dwayne Haskins QB (Washington)	Stephon Gilmore CB (New England)
16	Daniel Jones (NY Giants)	Saquon Barkley (NY Giants)	Daniel Jones QB (NY Giants)	not presented
17	Ryan Fitzpatrick (Miami)	Derrick Henry (Tennessee)	Gardner Minshew QB (Jacksonville)	not presented
POY	Lamar Jackson (Baltimore)	Derrick Henry (Tennessee)	Nick Bosa (San Francisco)	Gardner Minshew QB (Jacksonville)

Month	Rookie of the Month	
Month	Offensive	Defensive
Sept.	Gardner Minshew QB (Jaguars)	Brian Burns OLB (Panthers)
Oct.	Josh Jacobs RB (Raiders)	Nick Bosa DE (49ers)
Nov.	Josh Jacobs RB (Raiders)	Devin White LB (Buccaneers)
Dec.	A. J. Brown WR (Titans)	Devin White LB (Buccaneers)

== Head coaching and front office personnel changes ==
=== Head coaches ===
==== Off-season ====
Team	Departing coach	Interim coach	Incoming coach	Reason for leaving	Notes
Arizona Cardinals	Steve Wilks		Kliff Kingsbury	Fired	Wilks was fired on December 31, 2018, after one season in which he accrued a record of 3–13 (.188). Kingsbury, who had spent most of the previous six seasons as head coach of Texas Tech, was hired on January 8, 2019.
Cincinnati Bengals	Marvin Lewis		Zac Taylor	Mutual decision	Lewis and the Bengals mutually agreed to part ways on December 31 after a 6–10 (.375) season. In 16 years as the Bengals' head coach, Lewis was 131–122–3 (.518), with 7 playoff appearances. The Bengals never won a playoff game under Lewis and had missed the playoffs in each of his last three seasons. Taylor was named as head coach on February 5, 2019. This is his first experience as head coach after serving as the Los Angeles Rams' quarterbacks coach. At 35 years old, he became the 2nd youngest active coach in the NFL, after Sean McVay, who coaches Taylor's former team, the Rams.
Cleveland Browns	Hue Jackson	Gregg Williams	Freddie Kitchens	Fired	Jackson was fired on October 29, 2018, accumulating a 3–36–1 (.088) record during his 2 1/2-season tenure with the Browns. Jackson failed to win any away games during his tenure and lost every game in 2017. Defensive coordinator Gregg Williams, who previously served as Buffalo Bills head coach from 2001 to 2003, finished out the 2018 season with a 5–3 (.625) record. Kitchens was promoted to head coach on January 12, 2019, after serving as the interim offensive coordinator following Jackson's firing. This is his first head coaching position.
Denver Broncos	Vance Joseph		Vic Fangio	Fired	Joseph was fired on December 31, 2018, after a 6–10 (.375) season. The Broncos were 11–21 (.344) in Joseph's two losing seasons as head coach, with no playoff appearances. Fangio, a first-time head coach with over 30 years experience as an assistant dating back to the USFL, most recently as defensive coordinator of the Chicago Bears, was hired on January 10, 2019.
Green Bay Packers	Mike McCarthy	Joe Philbin	Matt LaFleur	Fired	McCarthy was fired on December 2, 2018. McCarthy left with a record of 135–85–2 (.613) with nine playoff appearances and one Super Bowl championship. Philbin, the team's offensive coordinator, finished the season as interim coach with a record of 2–2 (.500). LaFleur was hired on January 8, 2019. Previously the offensive coordinator for the Tennessee Titans, this is his first head coaching position.
Miami Dolphins	Adam Gase		Brian Flores	Fired	Gase was fired on December 31, 2018, after a 7–9 (.438) season. The Dolphins were 23–25 (.479) in Gase's three years as head coach, with one playoff appearance in 2016. Flores, formerly the New England Patriots' long time assistant, recently as linebackers coach, was announced as head coach on February 5, 2019. After being with the Patriots organization since 2004, this is his first head coaching position.
New York Jets	Todd Bowles		Adam Gase	Fired	Bowles was fired on December 30, 2018, finishing the season with a record of 4–12 (.250) and a cumulative record of 24–40 (.375) with no playoff appearances in four seasons with Jets. Gase, who was previously the head coach of the Miami Dolphins, posting a 23–25 (.479) record in three seasons, was hired on January 11, 2019.
Tampa Bay Buccaneers	Dirk Koetter		Bruce Arians	Fired	Koetter was fired on December 30, 2018, after a 5–11 (.313) season. The Buccaneers were 19–29 (.396) in Koetter's three years as head coach, with no playoff appearances. Previously, Koetter was Buccaneers' offensive coordinator for one season in 2015. Arians was announced as the Buccaneers' new head coach on January 8, 2019. He was previously the head coach for the Arizona Cardinals for five seasons with 50–32–1 (.608) record from 2013 to 2017, leading them to an NFC Championship Game appearance in 2015.

==== In-season ====
Team	Departing coach	Reason for leaving	Interim replacement	Notes
Washington Redskins	Jay Gruden	Fired	Bill Callahan	After an 0–5 start, Gruden was fired on October 7. He had a 35–49–1 (.418) record for his 5+ season tenure with the Redskins, with one playoff appearance in 2015. Callahan, the team's assistant head coach/offensive line coach, was previously the head coach of the Oakland Raiders in 2002 and 2003, with a record of 15–17 (.469) and one Super Bowl appearance.
Carolina Panthers	Ron Rivera	Fired	Perry Fewell	Rivera was fired on December 3, after going 5–7–0 (.417) in the first 13 weeks of the season. In 8+ seasons as the Panthers head coach, they were 76–63–1 (.546), with playoff appearances including 3 NFC South division titles and 1 Super Bowl appearance, going 3–4–0 (.429) in the playoffs. Fewell, the defensive backs coach, took over on an interim basis until the end of the season. A longtime defensive assistant in the NFL, his only head coaching experience was as the Buffalo Bills interim head coach for the last 7 games of the 2009 season. The Bills went 3–4–0 (.429) in those 7 games.

=== Front office personnel ===
==== Off-season ====
Team	Position	Departing office holder	Interim replacement	Incoming office holder	Reason for leaving	Notes
Baltimore Ravens	General manager	Ozzie Newsome		Eric DeCosta	Retired	The Ravens announced on February 2, 2018, that Newsome would retire after 16 years as the team's GM and that Eric DeCosta, most recently the Ravens' assistant GM, would succeed Newsome. Newsome was the first African American to occupy the GM position in the NFL.
Oakland Raiders	General manager	Reggie McKenzie	Shaun Herock	Mike Mayock	Fired	McKenzie was fired on December 10, 2018, after six-plus seasons as Raiders' GM. Herock, team's director of college scouting, served as the Raiders' interim GM until the team settled on a full-time replacement. Mayock had previously been a television commentator for the past 26 seasons and has never held a front office position.
New York Jets	General manager	Mike Maccagnan	Adam Gase	Joe Douglas	Fired	Maccagnan was fired on May 15, 2019, after four seasons; vice president of player personnel Brian Heimerdinger was also dismissed. Head coach Adam Gase was named interim GM. Douglas was named the new GM on June 7, 2019.
Houston Texans	General manager	Brian Gaine	by committee		Fired	Gaine was unexpectedly fired on June 7, 2019, after only one season and returned to his previous position with the Buffalo Bills. The Texans have not replaced Gaine; instead, the team has divided the general manager role among several of the team's executives.

== Stadiums ==
=== Rams' and Chargers' new stadium ===
This was the third and final season for the Los Angeles Chargers at Dignity Health Sports Park and the fourth and final season for the Los Angeles Rams at Los Angeles Memorial Coliseum. Both teams moved to SoFi Stadium in Inglewood, California, starting in 2020.

=== Bills' potential for relocation ===
A buyout window in the Buffalo Bills' lease on New Era Field opened after the 2019 season. The window allowed the team to cancel its lease on the stadium for a $28 million fee and relocate. If the Bills chose not to exercise the buyout window, they will not be allowed to relocate until after the 2022 season, when the current lease expires. The Bills chose not to exercise the buyout.

=== Broncos' naming rights ===
On September 4, the Denver Broncos' home field was rebranded as Empower Field at Mile High. The Broncos had been seeking a long-term naming rights partner for their home field since sporting goods retailer Sports Authority went bankrupt in 2016. Empower Retirement, a retirement plan provider that is based in Denver, had served as a team sponsor since 2015, with the Broncos agreeing to terms on a 21-year deal that will run through 2039, though financial terms were not disclosed. This marks the third naming rights change for the Broncos' home field, following "Invesco Field at Mile High" (2001–2010), "Sports Authority Field at Mile High" (2011–2017) and "Broncos Stadium at Mile High" – the latter of which was used on a temporary basis for 2018.

=== Raiders' relocation ===
This was the final season for the Oakland Raiders at RingCentral Coliseum (renamed from the Oakland–Alameda County Coliseum in May 2019) before moving to Allegiant Stadium in Las Vegas, Nevada. The Raiders' lease on the Coliseum expired after the 2018 season. The Coliseum management expressed a reluctance to allow the Raiders to continue using the Coliseum after the lease expired unless the team paid more to cover the losses the Coliseum incurred by hosting Raiders games. In December 2018, the city of Oakland filed a lawsuit against the Raiders and the NFL seeking financial damages and unpaid debt, claiming the relocation was illegal but not asking for an injunction forcing the team to stay. The Raiders stated that if any legal action was filed against them, that they would not renew with the Coliseum and find another, undetermined, temporary home for 2019 until Allegiant Stadium was finished. The Raiders then attempted to negotiate a lease with Oracle Park in San Francisco before the San Francisco 49ers vetoed the plan as an infringement on their territorial rights. With the 49ers refusing to waive territorial rights, the Raiders were forced to either renegotiate with the Coliseum or find a temporary stadium outside the San Francisco Bay Area (something that the Raiders management was reluctant to do, though the team acknowledged and considered bids from San Antonio, Texas, and Tucson, Arizona). The Raiders, despite reservations about providing funds to the lawsuit being filed against them, negotiated a return to the Coliseum for 2019; a tentative agreement, pending Coliseum and league approval, was announced February 25. The lease agreement was approved by the Oakland Coliseum Authority, the Oakland city council, and Alameda County supervisors by March 21. The Coliseum was the last multi-purpose stadium to be the home of both an NFL and Major League Baseball team (the Oakland Athletics). Barring any future relocations, the Raiders' September 15 game against the Kansas City Chiefs stands as the last NFL game played on a dirt infield.

== Uniforms ==
=== Uniform changes ===
- Carolina Panthers: The Panthers switched to Nike's newest uniform template and updated their pants, removing the team logo from it and streamlining the piping stripe.
- Cleveland Browns: On September 4, the Browns announced that they would switch to their former Color Rush uniforms as their primary home set this season, and wore these uniforms for six home games.
- Houston Texans: On April 22, the Texans announced that they would add their primary logo on the back of their jerseys, their first uniform update in franchise history. The addition of the logo on the jersey's back makes them the third team in the NFL to do so, after the Arizona Cardinals and Buffalo Bills.
- Los Angeles Chargers: On April 16, the Chargers announced that they made their powder blue alternate jerseys the new primary uniforms. In addition to this announcement, they also swapped out their navy blue facemask for gold.
- Minnesota Vikings: On August 8, the Vikings announced an adjustment of the shade of purple on their helmets to better match the shade on the team's uniforms.
- New York Jets: On April 4, the Jets unveiled new uniforms, which introduced black as an accent color and resembled a modernized version of the uniform layout the Jets used from 1978 to 1997, including a return to green helmets and "TV numbers" on the shoulders.

=== Throwback uniforms ===
- Chicago Bears: To celebrate their 100th season, the Bears wore throwback jerseys based on their 1936 uniforms for two home games.

=== Patches ===
- 31 teams wore a version of the NFL centennial emblem, with the NFL shield beneath the "100," on the yoke of their jerseys in place of the regular NFL shield. The Chicago Bears instead wore their own centennial team patch, a customized version of the league-wide centennial emblem with the Bears' colors and logo, on the left side of the jersey.
- The Carolina Panthers and Jacksonville Jaguars wore patches to commemorate the 25th season for each franchise.
- The Oakland Raiders, Kansas City Chiefs and Los Angeles Chargers wore patches to commemorate the 60th season for each franchise.
- On October 10, the Arizona Cardinals unveiled a patch to commemorate the death of team owner Bill Bidwill. It featured his initials, "WVB."

== Media ==
This was the sixth year under the current broadcast contracts with ESPN/ABC, CBS, Fox and NBC. This includes "cross-flexing" (switching) Sunday afternoon games between CBS and Fox before or during the season (regardless of the conference of the visiting team). NBC airs Sunday Night Football, the annual Kickoff Game, and the primetime Thanksgiving game. ESPN airs Monday Night Football and the Pro Bowl with the latter being simulcast on ABC. Fox airs Thursday Night Football along with NFL Network, with Amazon Video and Twitch continuing to simulcast those games online in the second and final year of the two sites' current contract. Fox will also broadcast Super Bowl LIV in English, with Fox Deportes aired the game in Spanish . ESPN aired coverage for all three days of the 2019 NFL draft on ABC, replacing Fox's broadcast television simulcast of NFL Network in 2018. ABC's coverage catered towards a mainstream audience and was hosted by the panel of ESPN's College GameDay, while ESPN and NFL Network continued to carry more conventional coverage of the draft.

Under a one-year test, local stations in markets with NFL teams are allowed on a limited basis to air another NFL game opposite the game involving that city's home team, something that had previously been forbidden (this rule had already been waived for the Washington, D.C. market when the Baltimore Ravens are playing at the same time as the Washington Redskins on the opposite network—Washington, D.C., is a secondary market for the Ravens, for the Los Angeles market after the Rams' and Chargers' moves to LA and league-wide for Week 17 since 2014). It was originally reported that all media markets in the U.S. who have CBS and Fox affiliates will have access to three Sunday afternoon games every week regardless of whether the local team is playing at home. The league later clarified that teams will still be able to impose the home exclusivity blackout on a limited basis, so long as they lift the exclusivity at least twice.

The league has an option to cancel its contract with DirecTV after the 2019 season. DirecTV has had exclusive rights to the league's out-of-market sports package, NFL Sunday Ticket, since the package was introduced in 1994.

=== Personnel changes ===
On February 28, 2019, Jason Witten announced he would be leaving his color commentator position on Monday Night Football after one season; he returned to the Dallas Cowboys, where he had played tight end for fifteen seasons before joining ESPN in 2018. Witten was not replaced; Booger McFarland, who spent the previous season commentating from atop a crane-like contraption on the sideline, was moved into the booth. Former referee Jeff Triplette also left Monday Night Football as rules analyst. He was replaced with John Parry, who retired the same day his ESPN position was announced; Parry is the third rules analyst ESPN has hired in two years, following Triplette and Gerald Austin. Steve Tasker departed CBS after 21 seasons with the network, all but one as a color commentator, after CBS declined to renew Tasker's contract. Tasker anticipates moving to radio and calling games for Westwood One for the 2019 season. Twitch added "co-streaming" with live commentary from specially chosen users of the service for its 2019 Thursday night games.

=== Most watched regular season games ===
- DH = doubleheader; SNF = NBC Sunday Night Football

Rank	Date	Matchup				Network	Viewers (millions)	TV rating	Window	Significance
1	November 28, 4:30 ET	Buffalo Bills	26	Dallas Cowboys	15	CBS	32.6	13.5	Thanksgiving	Super Bowl XXVII and XXVIII rematch
2	November 24, 4:25 ET	Dallas Cowboys	9	New England Patriots	13	Fox	29.5	16.5	Late DH^{[a]}	
3	December 8, 4:25 ET	Kansas City Chiefs	23	New England Patriots	16	CBS	28.1	16.1	Late DH^{[b]}	2018 AFC Championship and Week 6 rematch
4	November 28, 12:30 ET	Chicago Bears	24	Detroit Lions	20	Fox	27.1	12.3	Thanksgiving	Bears–Lions Rivalry
5	December 22, 4:25 ET	Dallas Cowboys	9	Philadelphia Eagles	17	Fox	25.3	14.2	Late DH^{[d]}	Cowboys–Eagles Rivalry
6	November 17, 4:25 ET	New England Patriots	17	Philadelphia Eagles	10	CBS	24.9	14.0	Late DH^{[c]}	Super Bowl LII rematch
7	October 6, 4:25 ET	Green Bay Packers	34	Dallas Cowboys	24	Fox	24.6	13.8	Late DH^{[e]}	Cowboys–Packers Rivalry
8	September 29, 8:20 ET	Dallas Cowboys	10	New Orleans Saints	12	NBC	24.1	13.7	SNF	2018 Week 13 rematch
9	September 8, 4:25 ET	New York Giants	17	Dallas Cowboys	35	Fox	23.9	13.5	Late DH^{[f]}	Cowboys–Giants Rivalry
10	September 15, 4:25 ET	New Orleans Saints	9	Los Angeles Rams	27	Fox	23.3	13.2	Late DH^{[g]}	2018 NFC Championship and Week 9 rematch

*Note – Late DH matchups listed in table are the matchups that were shown to the largest percentage of the market.

1. DAL/NE was shown in 100% of the markets during the late doubleheader time slot of Fox coverage.
2. KC/NE was shown in 83% of the markets during the late doubleheader time slot of CBS coverage.
3. NE/PHI was shown in 93% of the markets during the late doubleheader time slot of CBS coverage.
4. DAL/PHI was shown in 88% of the markets during the late doubleheader time slot of Fox coverage.
5. GB/DAL was shown in 100% of the markets during the late doubleheader time slot of Fox coverage.
6. NYG/DAL was shown in 85% of the markets during the late doubleheader time slot of Fox coverage.
7. NO/LAR was shown in 81% of the markets during the late doubleheader time slot of Fox coverage.
