= Julién Davenport =

American football player (born 1995)

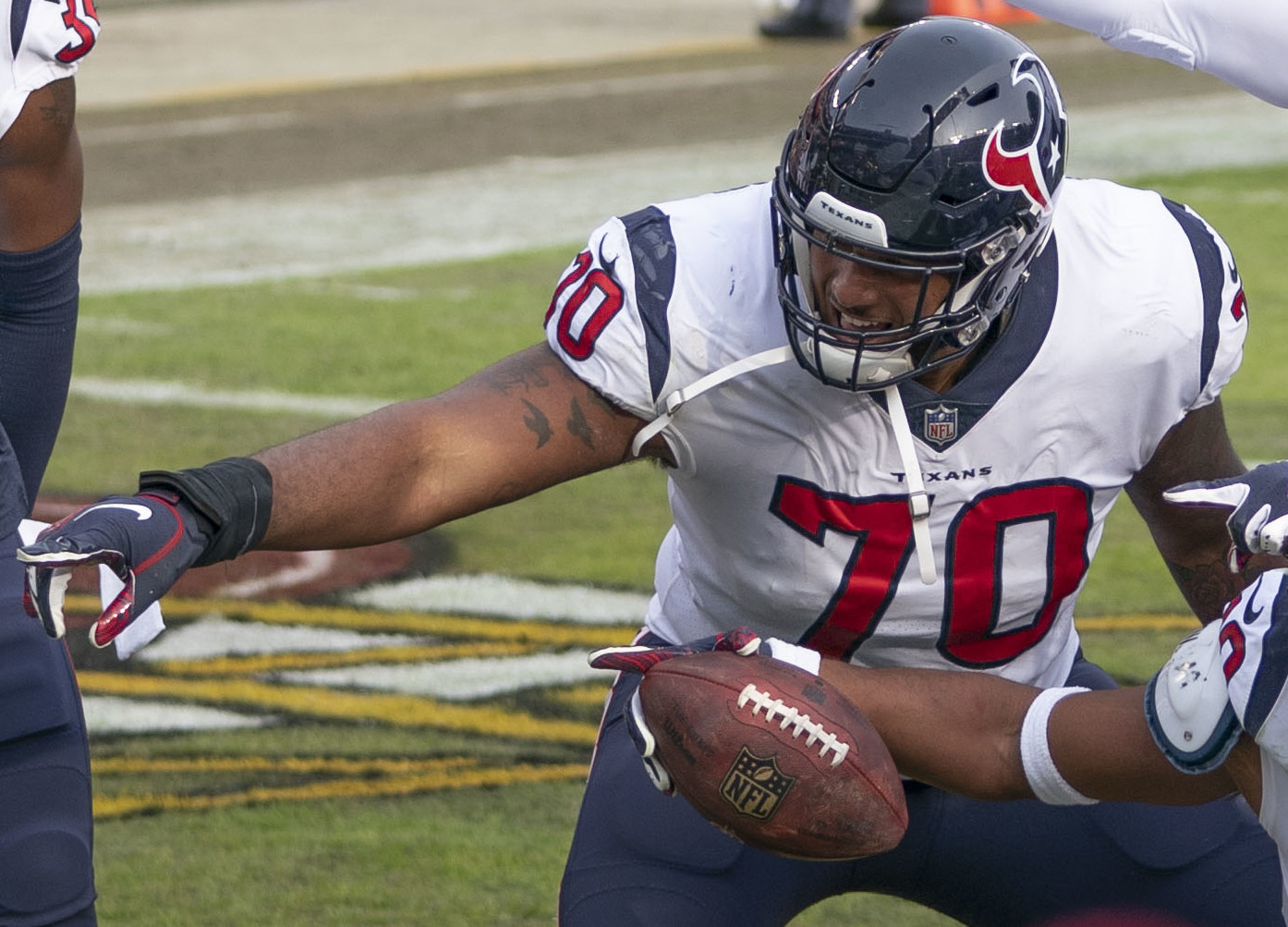
- Davenport with the Houston Texans in 2018

Profile
- Position: Offensive tackle

Personal information
- Born: January 9, 1995 (age 31); Paulsboro, New Jersey, U.S.
- Listed height: 6 ft 7 in (2.01 m)
- Listed weight: 315 lb (143 kg)

Career information
- High school: Paulsboro (NJ)
- College: Bucknell (2013-2016)
- NFL draft: 2017: 4th round, 130th overall pick

Career history
- Houston Texans (2017–2018); Miami Dolphins (2019–2020); Indianapolis Colts (2021); Chicago Bears (2022)*; Arizona Cardinals (2022–2023)*; New York Giants (2023)*; San Antonio Brahmas (2024); Atlanta Falcons (2024)*
- * Offseason or practice squad member only

Awards and highlights
- First-team All-Patriot League (2014–2016); Second-team All-Patriot League (2013)

Career NFL statistics
- Games played: 60
- Games started: 32
- Stats at Pro Football Reference

Julién Raymond Davenport (born January 9, 1995) is an American professional football offensive tackle. He played college football at Bucknell and was selected by the Houston Texans in the fourth round of the 2017 NFL draft. Davenport has also played for the Miami Dolphins and Indianapolis Colts.

== Professional career ==
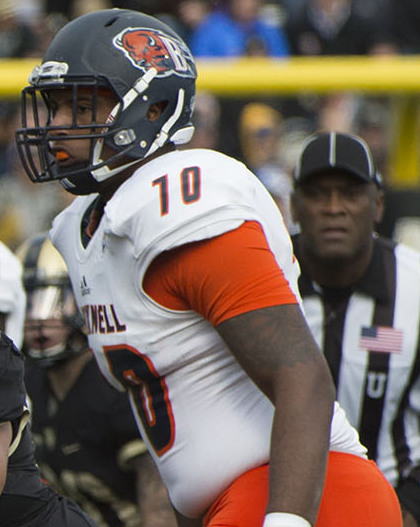
Davenport with Bucknell in 2015

Pre-draft measurables
Height	Weight	Arm length	Hand span	Wingspan	40-yard dash	10-yard split	20-yard split	20-yard shuttle	Three-cone drill	Vertical jump	Broad jump	Bench press
6 ft 6 3/4 in (2.00 m)	318 lb (144 kg)	36 1/2 in (0.93 m)	10 1/2 in (0.27 m)	7 ft 3 1/2 in (2.22 m)	5.45 s	1.88 s	3.12 s	4.69 s	7.57 s	29 in (0.74 m)	8 ft 11 in (2.72 m)	18 reps
All values from NFL Combine/Pro Day

=== Houston Texans ===
The Houston Texans selected Davenport in the fourth round (130th overall) of the 2017 NFL draft. On May 12, 2017, the Texans signed Davenport to a four-year, $2.98 million contract that included a signing bonus of $586,415. He played in 11 games with four starts as a rookie.

In 2018, Davenport started 15 games, 13 at left tackle and two at right tackle.

=== Miami Dolphins ===
On August 31, 2019, Davenport, Johnson Bademosi, 2020 and 2021 first round picks, and a 2021 second-round pick were traded to the Miami Dolphins in exchange for Laremy Tunsil, his teammate Kenny Stills, a 2020 fourth-round pick and 2021 sixth round pick. On September 12, 2019, Davenport suffered a hyperextended knee and a cracked fibula during practice and was placed on injured reserve the following day. He was designated for return from injured reserve on October 31, 2019, and began practicing with the team again. He was activated off injured reserve on November 16, 2019.

=== Indianapolis Colts ===
On March 29, 2021, Davenport signed with the Indianapolis Colts.

=== Chicago Bears ===
On April 25, 2022, Davenport signed with the Chicago Bears. He was released on August 23, 2022.

=== Arizona Cardinals ===
On November 16, 2022, Davenport was signed to the practice squad of the Arizona Cardinals. He signed a reserve/future contract on January 11, 2023. He was released on June 14.

=== New York Giants ===
On August 15, 2023, Davenport signed with the New York Giants following a workout. He was released on August 27.

=== San Antonio Brahmas ===
On April 17, 2024, Davenport signed with the San Antonio Brahmas of the United Football League (UFL). He was released on July 23.

=== Atlanta Falcons ===
On July 23, 2024, Davenport signed with the Atlanta Falcons. He was released on August 27, and re-signed to the practice squad. He was released on September 3.
