= Johnson Bademosi =

American football player (born 1990)

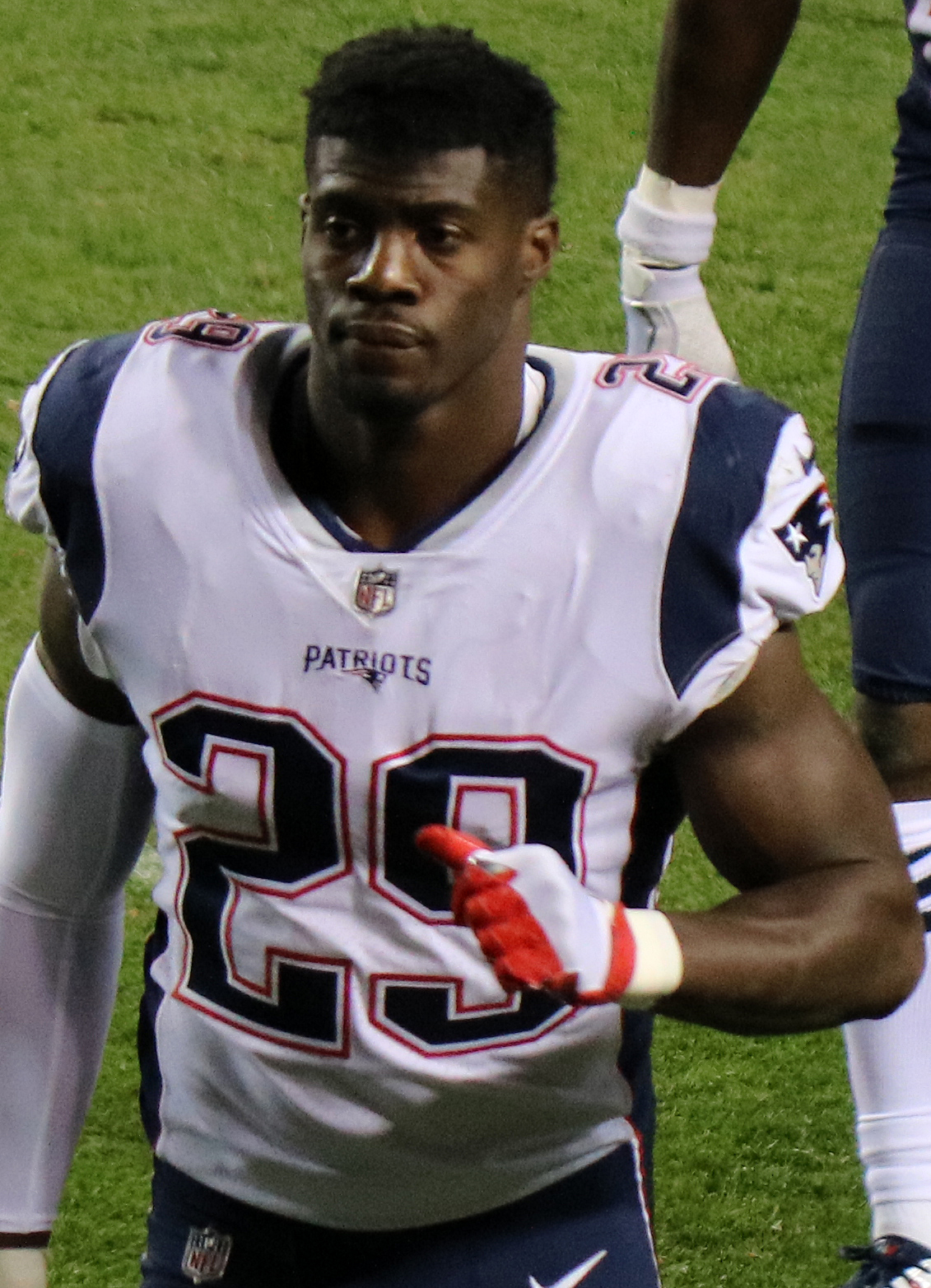
- Bademosi with the New England Patriots in 2017

No. 23, 24, 29
- Positions: Cornerback, special teamer

Personal information
- Born: July 23, 1990 (age 36); Washington, D.C., U.S.
- Listed height: 6 ft 0 in (1.83 m)
- Listed weight: 205 lb (93 kg)

Career information
- High school: Gonzaga College (Washington, D.C.)
- College: Stanford (2008-2011)
- NFL draft: 2012: undrafted

Career history
- Cleveland Browns (2012–2015); Detroit Lions (2016); New England Patriots (2017); Houston Texans (2018); Miami Dolphins (2019); New Orleans Saints (2019–2020)

Awards and highlights
- PFWA All-Rookie Team (2012)

Career NFL statistics
- Total tackles: 138
- Fumble recoveries: 2
- Pass deflections: 9
- Interceptions: 1
- Stats at Pro Football Reference

Johnson Bademosi (born July 23, 1990) is an American former professional football player who was a cornerback and special teamer in the National Football League (NFL). He was signed by the Cleveland Browns as an undrafted free agent in 2012. He was a member of the football, rugby, and track and field teams at Gonzaga College High School and went on to play college football for Stanford University.

== College career ==
Bademosi was a three-year starter at cornerback for Stanford. He recorded his first career interception against Washington during the 2010 season. Bademosi went on to be selected to the 2012 NFLPA Collegiate Bowl. He also received an All-Conference honorable mention at Stanford for his participation in track and field.

== Professional career ==
=== Cleveland Browns ===
In May 2012, Bademosi signed with the Cleveland Browns as an undrafted free agent.

Bademosi played sparingly on defense during his rookie season, but became a standout on special teams. He led the Browns (shared the lead in 2014) in special teams tackles each of his four seasons in Cleveland, and his 61 special teams tackles since 2012 rank second in the NFL during that span behind only Justin Bethel (64). He was named to the PFWA All-Rookie Team. During the 2015 season, he was the co-leader in the NFL in total special teams tackles with 17.

=== Detroit Lions ===
On March 11, 2016, the Detroit Lions signed Bademosi. On October 30, Week 8 of the NFL season, Bademosi recorded his first NFL Interception against the Houston Texans, picking off Brock Osweiler, in a 20–13 loss.

=== New England Patriots ===
On September 2, 2017, the Detroit Lions traded Bademosi to the New England Patriots for a 2019 sixth round draft pick. He played in all 16 games, starting three following an injury to Stephon Gilmore, recording a career-high 29 tackles. Bademosi and the Patriots reached Super Bowl LII, but the Patriots lost 41–33 to the Philadelphia Eagles with Bademosi recording one tackle in the game.

=== Houston Texans ===
On March 16, 2018, Bademosi signed a two-year contract with the Houston Texans.

=== Miami Dolphins ===
On August 31, 2019, Bademosi, Julien Davenport, two-first round picks, and a second-round pick were traded to the Miami Dolphins in exchange for Laremy Tunsil, his teammate Kenny Stills, and a fourth-round pick. He was released on October 14.

=== New Orleans Saints ===
On October 23, 2019, Bademosi was signed by the New Orleans Saints. He was placed on injured reserve on December 16.

On April 23, 2020, Bademosi was re-signed by the Saints. He was placed on the active/physically unable to perform list at the start of training camp on August 1. Bademosi was activated on August 14. He was placed on the injured reserve list on August 24.

== Personal life ==
Bademosi received the Maurice "Maus" Collins Award for excellence and leadership on and off the football field while at Gonzaga College High School. He was a history major while attending Stanford. The son of immigrants, he is of Nigerian descent.
