= 21st Century Fiction =

Studio album by the Amazons
- Released: 9 May 2025
- Recorded: January 2023–May 2024
- Studio: Zons East (Reading); Chapel Lane (Hereford); Real World (Bath); RBHQ (Brighton)
- Genre: Alternative rock; alternative country; hard rock
- Length: 44:09
- Label: Nettwerk
- Producer: Pete Hutchings

The Amazons chronology
| How Will I Know if Heaven Will Find Me? (2022) | 21st Century Fiction (2025) |

Singles from 21st Century Fiction
- 1. "Living a Lie" Released: 27 September 2024; 2. "Pitch Black" Released: 6 November 2024; 3. "My Blood" Released: 9 January 2025; 4. "Love is a Dog From Hell" Released: 14 February 2025; 5. "Night After Night" Released: 7 April 2025

21st Century Fiction is the fourth studio album by British hard rock band the Amazons. The album was released on 9 May 2025 through Nettwerk Music Group.

== Music and composition ==
The album has been described by critics as being alternative rock, alternative country, and hard rock.

== Critical reception ==
Professional ratings
Review scores
| Source | Rating |
|---|---|
| Clash | 4/5 stars |
| Classic Rock | 4/5 stars |
| The Courier | 4/5 stars |
| Kerrang! | 4/5 stars |
| Northern Exposure | 5/5 stars |
| RGM Press | 8.5/10 stars |

21st Century Fiction has received generally positive reviews from contemporary music critics. Rachel Roberts, writing for Kerrang!, gave the album four stars out of five and praised the change in sound direction by the band. Roberts said "the Reading renegades swap indie for riled up rock'n'roll on sassy fourth record". Further, Roberts said the Amazons on this album "somehow manages to feel filthy, sexy, and tender all at the same time."

Karl Blakesley, writing for Clash, also gave the album a four star review saying it's an excellent mix of their earlier hard rock and more indie rock sensibilities. Blakesley further said "the Amazons have taken all the best elements of their previous records to create the album it feels they've always been striving towards."

== Track listing ==
All lyrics are written by Matthew Thomson; all music is composed by Matthew Thomson, Chris Alderton, and Elliot James Briggs.

21st Century Fiction track listing
| No. | Title | Length |
|---|---|---|
| 1. | "Living a Lie" | 4:33 |
| 2. | "Night After Night" | 4:15 |
| 3. | "(Panic)" | 0:25 |
| 4. | "Pitch Black" | 4:25 |
| 5. | "My Blood" | 4:05 |
| 6. | "(Shake Me Down)" | 0:31 |
| 7. | "Wake Me Up" | 5:31 |
| 8. | "(Intermission)" | 1:05 |
| 9. | "Joe Bought a Gun" | 3:27 |
| 10. | "Love is a Dog From Hell" | 3:09 |
| 11. | "The Heat! Pt. 2" | 3:33 |
| 12. | "Heaven Now" | 3:08 |
| 13. | "Go All the Way" | 6:12 |
| Total length: | | 44:09 |

== Personnel ==
Credits adapted from the album's liner notes.

=== The Amazons ===
- Matthew Thomson – vocals, rhythm guitar
- Christopher Alderton – lead guitar, additional production
- Elliot Briggs – bass guitar

=== Additional musicians ===
- George Le Page – drums
- Ben Thatcher – drums
- Ella McRobb – vocals
- Quentin LaChapèle – strings
- Fiona-Lee – additional vocals
- Jessica Greaves – additional vocals
- Rosie Goddard – additional vocals

=== Technical ===
- Pete Hutchings – production, mixing, engineering
- Catherine Marks – production on track 2, 10
- Mike Kerr – production on track 5
- Richie Kennedy – engineering on track 2, 10
- Matt Colton – mastering

== Charts ==
=== Weekly charts ===
Weekly chart performance for 21st Century Fiction
| Chart (2025) | Peak position |
|---|---|
| Scottish Albums (OCC) | 6 |
| UK Albums (OCC) | 26 |
| UK Independent Albums (OCC) | 2 |
| UK Rock & Metal Albums (OCC) | 2 |
