= Holy Roller (American football) =

Controversial American football play

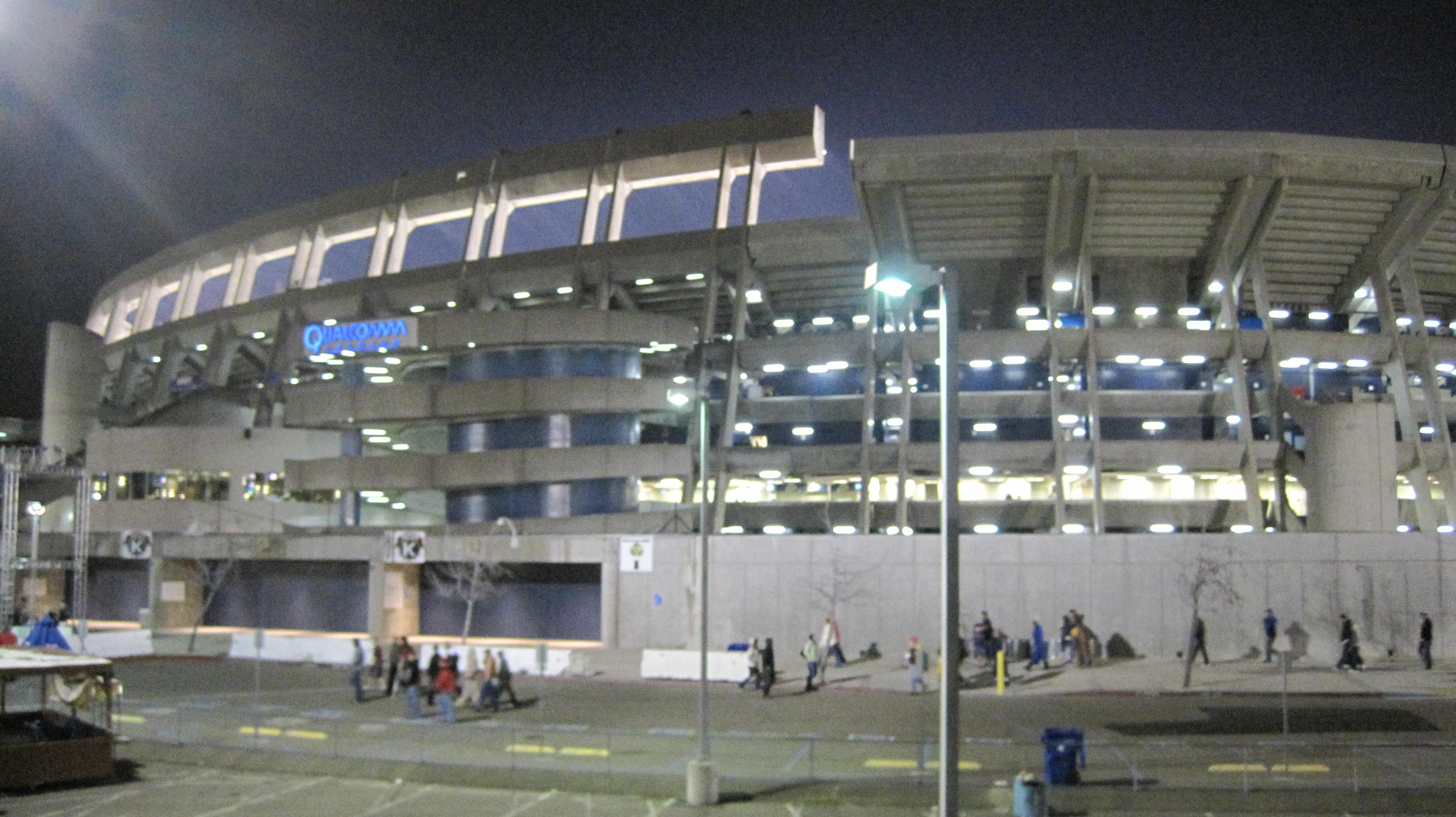
- San Diego Stadium, the site of the game
Oakland Raiders (0–1)	San Diego Chargers (1–0)
21	20
Head coach: John Madden	Head coach: Tommy Prothro
	1	2	3	4	Total
OAK	0	7	0	14	21
SD	0	13	0	7	20
- Date: September 10, 1978
- Stadium: San Diego Stadium; San Diego, California
- Referee: Jerry Markbreit

TV in the United States
- Network: NBC
- Announcers: Jim Simpson and Paul Warfield

In American football, the Holy Roller was a controversial game-winning play by the Oakland Raiders against the San Diego Chargers on September 10, 1978, at San Diego Stadium in San Diego, California. It was officially ruled as a forward fumble by Raiders quarterback Ken Stabler that was recovered by his teammate, tight end Dave Casper, in the end zone for a touchdown, giving Oakland a 21–20 win. However, there have been differing interpretations of how this play should have actually been ruled, and it has remained a controversial play for fans of both teams involved. The NFL amended its rules after the 1978 season to prevent a recurrence of the play. Chargers fans refer to the play as the Immaculate Deception. (Note: The term "Immaculate Deception" is a reference to the Immaculate Reception football play which happened 6 years earlier, which is in turn a pun derived from Immaculate Conception.)

== The play ==
With 10 seconds left in the game, the Raiders had possession of the ball at the Chargers' 14-yard line, trailing 20–14. Raiders quarterback Ken Stabler took the snap and found himself about to be sacked by Chargers linebacker Woodrow Lowe on the 24-yard line. The ball came out of Stabler's hands and moved forward towards the Chargers' goal line. Raiders running back Pete Banaszak appeared to try to recover the ball on the 12-yard line, but did not keep his footing, and pitched the ball with both hands even closer to the end zone. Raiders tight end Dave Casper was the next player to reach the ball but he also seemingly could not get a handle on it. He batted and kicked the ball into the end zone, where he fell on it for the game-tying touchdown as time ran out. With the ensuing extra point by placekicker Errol Mann, the Raiders won 21–20.

According to the NFL rulebook, "If a runner intentionally fumbles forward, it is a forward pass." Also during the play, the game officials ruled that Banaszak and Casper's actions were legal because it was impossible to determine if they intentionally batted the ball forward, which would have been ruled a penalty. The National Football League (NFL) also supported referee Jerry Markbreit's call that Stabler fumbled the ball instead of throwing it forward.

For years, Stabler publicly stated that it was a fumble. However, in a 2008 interview on NFL Films, he was asked if he could convince the camera crew that he did not flip the ball forward. Stabler responded, "No, I can't convince you of that, because I did. I mean, what else was I going to do with it? Throw it out there, shake the dice." Banaszak and Casper also admitted that they deliberately batted the ball towards the end zone.

1978 Week Two: Oakland Raiders at San Diego Chargers

Quarter	1	2	3	4	Total
Raiders	0	7	0	14	21
Chargers	0	13	0	7	20

at San Diego Stadium, San Diego, California

- Date: September 10, 1978
- Game time: 4:00 p.m. PST
- Game weather: 71 °F (22 °C), humid
- Referee: Jerry Markbreit
- TV announcers (NBC): Jim Simpson and Paul Warfield
- Boxscore

Game information

Second quarter

- SD Pat Curran 14-yard pass from Fouts (Rolf Benirschke kick)
- OAK Dave Casper 6-yard pass from Stabler (Errol Mann kick)
- SD Hank Bauer 1-yard run (conversion failed)

Fourth quarter

- SD Bauer 2-yard run (Benirschke kick)
- OAK Bradshaw 44-yard pass from Stabler (Mann kick)
- OAK Casper offensive fumble recovery in end zone (Mann kick)

Top passers

- OAK – Ken Stabler – 15/35, 307 YDS, 2 TD, 3 INT
- SD – Dan Fouts – 17/29, 175 YDS, TD

Top rushers

- OAK – Mark van Eeghen – 12 CAR, 72 YDS
- SD – Bo Matthews – 20 CAR, 78 YDS

Top receivers

- OAK – Morris Bradshaw – 4 REC, 107 YDS, TD
- SD – Don Woods – 4 REC, 51 YDS

== Effect on 1978 NFL season ==
Had the Chargers won this game — and, importantly, had all other games that season remained with the same outcome — they would have made the playoffs as one of the two wildcard teams, by virtue of a tiebreaker over the Houston Oilers. Both the Chargers and Oilers would have finished with a 10–6 record, but as the Chargers' final game of the season was a 45-24 victory over the Oilers in Houston in week 16, the Chargers would have won the tiebreaker on a head-to-head matchup and clinched the fifth seed in the postseason. The final Houston-San Diego game therefore would have had direct playoff consequence, with the winner advancing to the playoffs and the loser being eliminated, rather than being the relatively meaningless game it ended up as, with the Chargers already eliminated and the Oilers already having clinched a wildcard berth.

However, one direct consequence of San Diego’s poor start to the 1978 season (they were 1–4 after five weeks and 2–6 at the halfway mark) was the resignation of head coach Tommy Prothro and his replacement by former St. Louis Cardinals coach Don Coryell following a 24-3 loss to Green Bay in week 4. Had the Chargers won this game, the likelihood exists that, at 2–2 rather than 1–3, Prothro may not have chosen to resign as San Diego’s coach at that point. As Coryell’s coaching style and wide-open offensive attack (dubbed "Air Coryell") were crucial to the Chargers’ drastic turnaround in 1978, and subsequent playoff run from 1979 to 1982, it is possible that their loss in the Holy Roller game helped propel San Diego into one of the most successful periods in the franchise’s history; and equally possible that a Prothro-coached team throughout 1978 may not have put together the same run of late-season victories to be in the position of playing a "win-and-in/loser-goes-home" game against the Oilers.

As for Oakland, their uneven and ultimately disappointing 1978 season resulted in the team missing the playoffs for the first time since 1971. Losing the Holy Roller game, with all other outcomes remaining as they were, would simply have eliminated the Raiders from playoff contention earlier in the season.

The Chargers would more directly avenge the outcome of this game with a late-game 27-23 victory over the Raiders in Oakland during week 9, kick-starting their 7–1 second season-half rally.

== Reaction ==
Chargers fans responded with T-shirts depicting a blindfolded referee signaling a touchdown along with the words Immaculate Deception. The nickname was a play off the Immaculate Reception, a play that went against the Raiders in the 1972 playoffs against Pittsburgh.

In response to the Holy Roller, the league passed new rules in the off-season, restricting fumble advances by the offense. If a player fumbles after the two-minute warning in a half/overtime, or on fourth down at any time during the game, only the fumbling player can recover and advance the ball. If that player's teammate recovers the ball during those situations, it is placed back at the spot of the fumble, unless it was a recovery for a loss, in which case the ball is dead and placed at the point of recovery.

The Holy Roller play was directly referenced on December 14, 2014, in response to a critical play in the Green Bay Packers' loss to the Buffalo Bills. When Aaron Rodgers had the ball knocked out of his hand by Mario Williams, it rolled backward into the end zone and came to a complete stop; Packers RB Eddie Lacy picked up the ball and was going to run with it, but the referee approached quickly, waving his hands to declare the play dead with Lacy's recovery recorded for a loss, and after talking to the back judge, signaled a safety for Buffalo. The NFL Director of Officiating said that since the Holy Roller rules were in place, the only player who could have picked up the fumble and advanced it for Green Bay was the original fumbler (Rodgers); thus, the safety call was correct.

The Holy Roller rule negated a game-winning touchdown in a Week 15 2020 game between Las Vegas Raiders and Los Angeles Chargers, the two teams involved in the original play. After Chargers quarterback Justin Herbert fumbled while attempting a sneak at the Las Vegas 1-yard line on the first play within the two minute warning, Chargers fullback Gabe Nabers recovered the ball in the end zone. Referee John Hussey explained that in these conditions, the ball should be placed at the spot of the fumble since the fumbler's teammate recovered for a gain. Herbert would rush for the game-winning score on the next play.

== See also ==
- Chargers–Raiders rivalry
- Broadcast: Raiders vs. Chargers, September 10, 1978 KGO-AM Radio play-by-play by Bill King and Monty Stickles
- List of nicknamed NFL games and plays
- Holy Roller – The event's common name is a pun on this slang term in American religion.
- The Miracle at the Meadowlands, another last-second play involving a fumble in a 1978 NFL game.
- Fumblerooski – Other deliberate fumble plays.

== Sources ==
- Total Football: The Official Encyclopedia of the National Football League (ISBN 0-06-270174-6)
