= Future Dust =

Studio album by The Amazons
- Released: 24 May 2019
- Genre: Alternative rock; psychedelic rock; hard rock
- Length: 42:53
- Label: Fiction; UMG
- Producer: Catherine Marks

The Amazons chronology
Come the Fire, Come the Evening (2018)	Future Dust (2019)	How Will I Know If Heaven Will Find Me? (2022)

Singles from Future Dust
- 1. "Mother" Released: 5 February 2019; 2. "Doubt It" Released: 8 April 2019

Future Dust is the second studio album by British alternative rock band, The Amazons. The album was released on 24 May 2019 through Fiction Records and Universal Music Group. An "Expanded Edition" version of the album was released digitally on 17 January 2020, featuring 2 new tracks and an acoustic cover of the track "Mother". These 3 tracks were released in the US on an album titled Introducing... The Amazons, which features a collection of tracks from the band's first two albums.

== Background ==
Inspiration for writing the album came when the band was in Three Cliffs Bay near Swansea, Wales. Matt Thomson described the experience as "very idyllic, somewhere you can get lost and, because there isn't a huge amount of signal, we really felt cut off from the world." Thomson said the isolation of Three Cliffs helped the band form a bond again and escape technology. "In a positive way, because we got some time and space to gain a bit of perspective and a real sense of what was going on outside. We listened to huge amounts of music. We cooked together, hung out together and bonded again, and got into the groove of writing, recording and knowing what we wanted to do sonically and lyrically. Especially with the music that we were very intent on making, kind of unapologetic rock and roll."

== Style and composition ==
Courtney Farrell, writing for Billboard described the album as "an undeniable evolution from the Amazons' debut self-titled album, both lyrically and sonically; a result of personal growth and retrospection. The band unapologetically confronts the world around us, tackling subjects from social media and facing new challenges with age, to eating disorders and depression, all the while maintaining brazen riffs and captivating melodies."

== Release and promotion ==
Two singles were released prior to the release of Future Dust. The first single, "Mother" came out on 5 February 2019, and the second single, "Doubt It" came out 8 April 2019. The second single coincided with the announcement of Future Dust.

== Critical reception ==
Professional ratings
Aggregate scores
Source	Rating
Album of the Year	67/100
Review scores
Source	Rating
Dork	4/5 stars
Gigwise	7/10 stars
The Independent	4/5 stars
IINAG	4/5 stars
Kerrang!	4/5 stars
NME	2/5 stars

Future Dust has received generally positive reviews from contemporary music critics. On review aggregator website, Album of the Year, Future Dust has an average score of 67 based on three critic reviews.

Murjani Rawls, writing for Substream Magazine praised the album, saying that the band has "found their edge" on Future Dust. Rawls said that with their second album in tow, The Amazons are ready to introduce you to the band that they were building to be all along. Heavier riffs, blues influences, and a real sense of direction permeate throughout this album. A testament to a band with more confidence and something to say."

Jamie MacMillan, writing for Dork gave Future Dust four stars out of five, saying that the band is showing their potential to become one of the biggest bands in British rock music. Summarizing Future Dust, MacMillan said that it's a record from a group that is less interested in showing where they've been, but instead where they could go." Paul Travers, writing for rock music tabloid, Kerrang! also gave Future Dust a four out of five-star rating, calling the record a heavier, energetic record. Traves compared Future Dust to the likes of Royal Blood, Led Zeppelin, Queens of the Stone Age, and Howlin' Wolf. Travers further praised Matt Thomson's singing on the album stating Future Dust has "crystalline vocals are a high point, and are put to particularly good use on the more melodic moments." Travers summarised Future Dust as "smart, sexy and it rocks like a wild thing. When the Future Dust settles, The Amazons might just stand as a band worth all the hype and more".

Hannah Mylrea of NME offered a more critical review of Future Dust. Mylrea felt the band fell short of the expectations they should have delivered, given their eponymous debut album. Mylrea summarised the album as "limp and lifeless".

== Track listing ==
All lyrics are written by Chris Alderton, Elliot Briggs, Joe Emmett, and Matt Thomson; all music is composed by The Amazons.

No.	Title	Length
1.	"Mother"	4:46
2.	"Fuzzy Tree"	3:31
3.	"25"	3:18
4.	"The Mire"	0:34
5.	"Doubt It"	4:51
6.	"All Over Town"	4:21
7.	"End of Wonder"	3:58
8.	"Dark Visions"	4:19
9.	"25 (Reprise)"	2:19
10.	"Warning Sign"	5:02
11.	"Georgia"	5:54
Total length:		42:53

Expanded Edition tracks
No.	Title	Length
12.	"Mother (Acoustic)"	4:11
13.	"Heart of Darkness"	3:23
14.	"Howlin’"	4:46
Total length:		54:33

== Personnel ==
- Matt Thomson – vocals, guitar
- Chris Alderton – guitar
- Elliot Briggs – bass guitar
- Joe Emmett – drums

== Charts ==
Chart (2019)	Peak position
Scottish Albums (OCC)	11
UK Albums (OCC)	9
