= The Amazons (album) =

Studio album by The Amazons
- Released: 26 May 2017
- Genres: Alternative rock; psychedelic rock; power pop
- Length: 44:44
- Label: Fiction

The Amazons chronology
Don't You Wanna (2015)	The Amazons (2017)	Come the Fire, Come the Evening (2018)

Singles from The Amazons
- 1. "Stay With Me" Released: 1 March 2016; 2. "In My Mind" Released: 30 August 2016; 3. "Little Something" Released: 22 November 2016; 4. "Black Magic" Released: 14 February 2017; 5. "Junk Food Forever" Released: 19 April 2017; 6. "Ultraviolet" Released: 15 August 2017; 7. "Palace" Released: 24 November 2017

The Amazons is the debut studio album by British alternative rock band The Amazons. It was released on 26 May 2017 through Fiction Records. The album debuted at number eight on the UK Album Charts.

== Background ==
Five singles were released prior to the album. The opening track "Stay With Me" featured on the soundtrack to the football simulation game FIFA 18, while "Black Magic" featured on fellow football simulation game PES 2019.

== Track listing ==
All lyrics are written by Chris Alderton, Elliot Briggs, Joe Emmett, and Matt Thomson; all music is composed by The Amazons.

No.	Title	Length
1.	"Stay With Me"	3:15
2.	"Burn My Eyes"	4:18
3.	"In My Mind"	3:50
4.	"Junk Food Forever"	3:46
5.	"Raindrops"	4:46
6.	"Black Magic"	4:31
7.	"Ultraviolet"	3:38
8.	"Little Something"	4:05
9.	"Holy Roller"	3:56
10.	"Something In The Water"	4:53
11.	"Palace"	3:46
Total length:		44:44

Deluxe edition
No.	Title	Length
12.	"In My Mind (Acoustic)"	4:23
13.	"Raindrops (Acoustic)"	4:33
14.	"Junk Food Forever (Acoustic)"	3:16
15.	"Little Something (Acoustic)"	3:29
16.	"Black Magic (Acoustic)"	4:02
17.	"Ultraviolet (Acoustic)"	3:45

== Critical reception ==
Professional ratings
Aggregate scores
Source	Rating
AnyDecentMusic?	6.2/10
Metacritic	64/100
Review scores
Source	Rating
Clash	8/10
The Daily Telegraph	4/5 stars
The Guardian	3/5 stars
Kerrang!	3/5 stars
The Line of Best Fit	8/10
Mojo	3/5 stars
NME	3/5 stars
The Observer	2/5 stars
Q	3/5 stars

At Metacritic, which assigns a normalised rating out of 100 to reviews from mainstream publications, the album received an average score of 64, based on nine reviews, indicating "generally favorable reviews".

== Charting ==
Chart (2017)	Peak position
Scottish Albums (Official Charts)	10
UK Albums (Official Charts)	8

== Personnel ==
- Matt Thomson: Singer & Guitarist
- Chris Alderton: Guitarist
- Elliot Briggs: Bass Player
- Joe Emmett: Drummer
