= The Amazons (band) =

British rock band

- Matt Thomson fronting the band at the Amazing Grace, London in 2022

Background information
- Origin: Reading, Berkshire, England
- Genres: Alternative rock; indie rock; hard rock; psychedelic rock
- Years active: 2014–present
- Label: Fiction
- Members: Matthew Thomson; Chris Alderton; Elliot James Briggs; Ella McRobb; George Le Page
- Past members: Joe Emmett
- Website: theamazons.co.uk

The Amazons are a British rock band from Reading, Berkshire, formed in 2014. The band's debut album rose to number 8 on the UK Albums Chart. They have also been named a band to listen to in 2017 by NME, The Independent and BBC Radio 1.

The band were included in MTV's and the BBC's Brand New for 2017 and Sound of 2017 longlists respectively. AllMusic described them as an indie rock group known for crafting catchy and melodic arena rock anthems suitable for singing along. They originally started life under the name Peers.

== Band members ==
- Matt Thomson – vocals, guitar (2014–present)
- Chris Alderton – guitar (2014–present)
- Elliot Briggs – bass (2014–present)
- George Le Page - drums (2026-present; touring member 2023–2026)
- Ella McRobb - vocals, keyboard (2026-present; touring member 2025–2026)

=== Past members ===
- Joe Emmett – drums (2014–2022)

== Discography ==
=== Studio albums ===
Title	Details	Peak chart positions
Title	Details	UK
The Amazons	Released: 26 May 2017; Label: Fiction; Format: CD, digital download	8
Future Dust	Released: 24 May 2019; Label: Fiction; Format: CD, digital download	9
How Will I Know If Heaven Will Find Me?	Released: 9 September 2022; Label: Fiction; Format: CD, vinyl, cassette, digital download	5
21st Century Fiction	Released: 9 May 2025; Label: Nettwerk Music Group; Format: CD, vinyl, cassette, digital download	26

=== Live albums ===
Title	Details
Come the Fire, Come the Evening	Released: 29 June 2018; Label: Fiction; Format: Digital download

=== Extended plays ===
Title	Details
Don't You Wanna	Released: 7 December 2015; Label: Fiction; Format: Digital download

=== Singles ===
Title	Year	Peak chart positions	Album
Title	Year	BEL (FL) Tip	Album
"Stay With Me"	2016	40	The Amazons
"Nightdriving"	2016	—	Non-album single
"In My Mind"	2016	—	The Amazons
"Little Something"	2016	—	The Amazons
"Black Magic"	2017	—	The Amazons
"Junk Food Forever"	2017	—	The Amazons
"Ultraviolet"	2017	—	The Amazons
"Palace"	2017	—	The Amazons
"Mother"	2019	—	Future Dust
"Doubt It"	2019	—	Future Dust
"End of Wonder"	2019	—	Future Dust
"25"	2019	—	Future Dust
"Bloodrush"	2022	—	How Will I Know If Heaven Will Find Me?
"Ready For Something"	2022	—	How Will I Know If Heaven Will Find Me?
"How Will I Know?"	2022	—	How Will I Know If Heaven Will Find Me?
"There's a Light"	2022	—	How Will I Know If Heaven Will Find Me?
"Living a Lie"	2024	—	21st Century Fiction
"Pitch Black"	2024	—	21st Century Fiction
"My Blood"	2025	—	21st Century Fiction
"Love is a Dog From Hell"	2025	—	21st Century Fiction
"Night After Night"	2025	—	21st Century Fiction
"Blood on the Bone"	2026	—	
"—" denotes a recording that did not chart or was not released in that territory.

=== Promotional singles ===
Title	Year	Album
"25"	2019	Future Dust

=== Music videos ===
Title	Year	Director
"Stay With Me"	2016	Matt Goff
"Nightdriving"	2016	Matt Goff
"In My Mind"	2016	Chris Hugall
"Little Something"	2017	
"Black Magic"	2017	Matt Goff
"Junk Food Forever"	2017	Michael Holyk
"Ultraviolet"	2017	Oscar Sansom
"Mother"	2019	Stephen Agnew
"Doubt It"	2019	Thomas James
"25"	2019	

== Awards and nominations ==
Year	Organization	Award	Work	Result
2016	Q Awards	Best Breakthrough Act	Themselves	Nominated
2016	MTV	Brand New for 2017	Themselves	Nominated
2016	BBC	Sound of 2017	Themselves	Nominated
2017	The Telegraph	The Best Albums of the Year	The Amazons	Included
