= 2018 Houston Texans season =

17th season in franchise history

- Owner: Bob McNair until his death on November 23, 2018; Janice and D. Cal McNair from November 24, 2018
- General manager: Brian Gaine
- Head coach: Bill O'Brien
- Defensive coordinator: Romeo Crennel
- Home stadium: NRG Stadium

Results
- Record: 11–5
- Division place: 1st AFC South
- Playoffs: Lost Wild Card Playoffs (vs. Colts) 7–21
- All-Pros: 2: WR DeAndre Hopkins (1st team); DE J. J. Watt (1st team)
- Pro Bowlers: 6: QB Deshaun Watson; RB Lamar Miller; WR DeAndre Hopkins; DE J. J. Watt; OLB Jadeveon Clowney; ILB Benardrick McKinney

Uniform
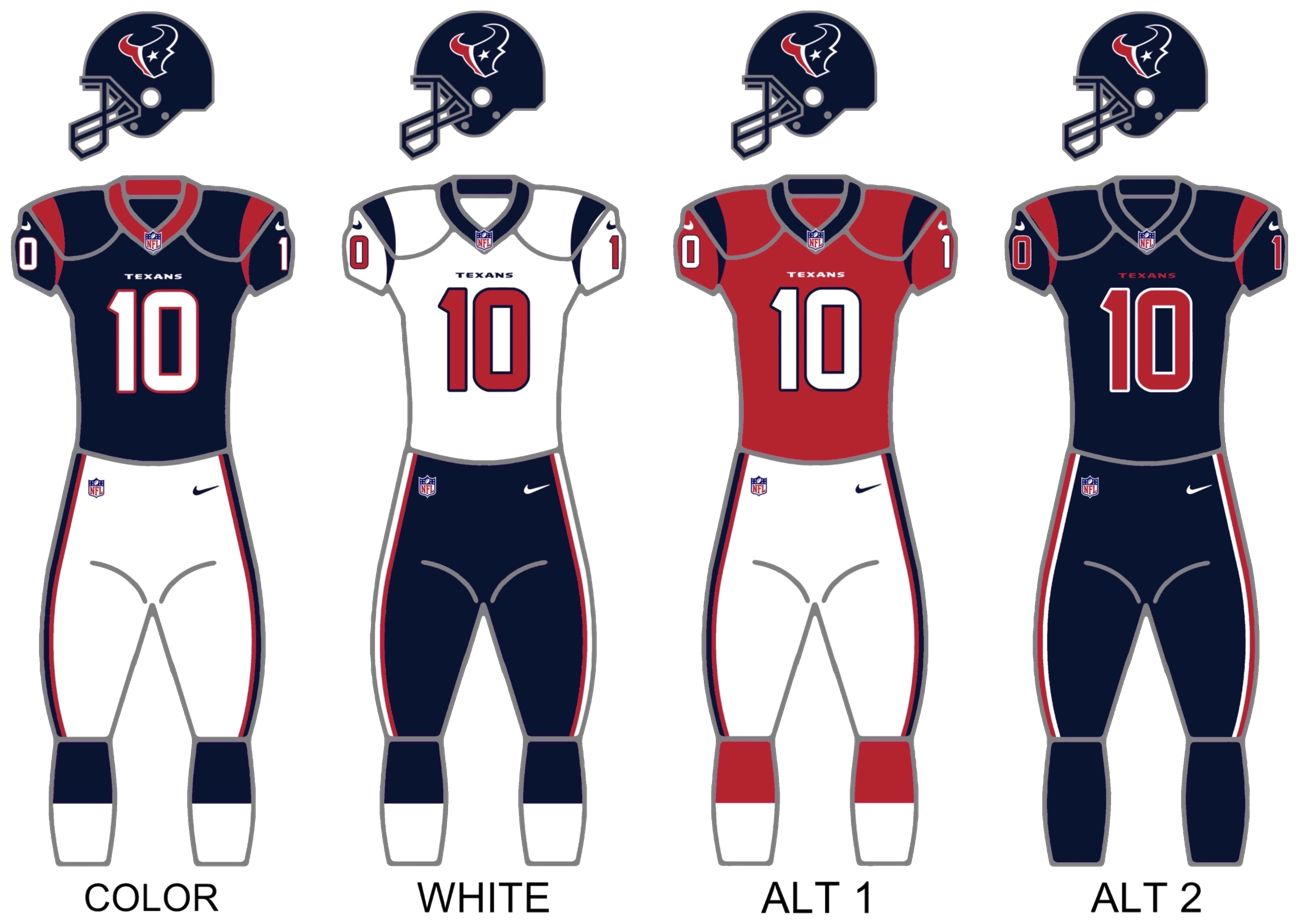

The 2018 season was the Houston Texans' 17th season in the National Football League (NFL) and their fifth under head coach Bill O'Brien. This marked the first season since 2005 that Rick Smith would not be the general manager as he took a leave of absence for family reasons. Despite an 0–3 start, their first in a decade, the Texans surpassed their win total from the previous season with a Week 8 win over the Miami Dolphins. They had a franchise record 9 consecutive wins that also broke the NFL record for most consecutive wins after starting 0–3. The streak ended with a Week 14 loss to the Indianapolis Colts. With a Week 15 win over the New York Jets, the Texans clinched their first 10-win season under head coach Bill O’Brien, their first 10-win season since 2012 and their third 10-win season in franchise history.

On November 23, 2018, Bob McNair, the founding owner of the Texans, died aged 81.

Despite losing to the Philadelphia Eagles in Week 16, the Texans clinched a playoff berth after the New Orleans Saints defeated the Pittsburgh Steelers later that day.

With a Week 17 win over the Jacksonville Jaguars, the Texans clinched the AFC South division, winning their fifth division title.

The Texans lost in the Wild Card Round of the playoffs, 21–7 to their AFC South rival, the Indianapolis Colts.

This season marked the first time the franchise qualified for the playoffs after starting 0-3, the next occurrence happening in 2025. They are also the first NFL team to accomplish this feat more than once.

== Draft ==
2018 Houston Texans draft
Round	Pick	Player	Position	College	Notes
3	68	Justin Reid	S	Stanford	
3	80	Martinas Rankin	OT	Mississippi State	from Seattle
3	98	Jordan Akins	TE	UCF	Compensatory pick
4	103	Keke Coutee	WR	Texas Tech	
6	177	Duke Ejiofor	DE	Wake Forest	
6	211	Jordan Thomas	TE	Mississippi State	Compensatory pick
6	214	Peter Kalambayi	LB	Stanford	Compensatory pick
7	222	Jermaine Kelly	CB	San Jose State	
Made roster † Pro Football Hall of Fame * Made at least one Pro Bowl during career

Draft trades

- The Texans traded their first-round selection (4th overall), as well as their 2017 first-round selection (25th overall) to the Cleveland Browns in exchange for Cleveland's first-round selection in 2017 (12th overall).
- The Texans traded their second-round selection (35th overall), their sixth-round selection in 2017 (188th overall) and quarterback Brock Osweiler to Cleveland in exchange for Cleveland's fourth-round selection in 2017 (142nd overall).
- The Texans traded their fifth-round selection (141st overall) and offensive tackle Duane Brown in exchange for Seattle's third-round selection (80th overall) and a second-round selection in 2019.
- The Texans were awarded one third-round and two sixth-round compensatory picks (98th, 211th and 214th overall).

== Staff ==
2018 Houston Texans staff
Front office: Owner – Janice McNair and D. Cal McNair; President – Jamey Rootes; General manager – Brian Gaine; Executive vice president of football operations – Rick Smith; Senior vice president of football administration – Chris Olsen; Director of college scouting – Jon Carr; Assistant director of college scouting – Mike Martin; Director of pro personnel – Rob Kisiel; Assistant director of pro personnel – C.J. Leak; Head coaches: Head coach – Bill O'Brien; Assistant head coach/defensive coordinator – Romeo Crennel; Offensive coaches: Quarterbacks – Sean Ryan; Running backs – Danny Barrett; Wide receivers – John Perry; Tight ends – Tim Kelly; Offensive line – Mike Devlin; Offensive assistant/assistant offensive line – Will Lawing; Offensive assistant/special teams assistant – Wes Welker	Defensive coaches: Defensive line – Anthony Weaver; Senior defensive assistant/outside linebackers – John Pagano; Inside linebackers – Bobby King; Secondary – Anthony Midget; Assistant secondary – D'Anton Lynn; Defensive quality control – Matt O'Donnell; Special teams coaches: Special teams coordinator – Brad Seely; Assistant special teams – Tracy Smith; Strength and conditioning: Senior director of sports performance – Luke Richesson; Assistant strength and conditioning – Brian Bell; Assistant strength and conditioning – Ian Jones

== Final roster ==
2018 Houston Texans roster
Quarterbacks (QB): 4 Deshaun Watson; 5 Joe Webb; 3 Brandon Weeden; Running backs (RB): 28 Alfred Blue; 27 D'Onta Foreman; 38 Buddy Howell; 26 Lamar Miller; Wide receivers (WR): 14 DeAndre Carter RS; 16 Keke Coutee; 10 DeAndre Hopkins; 11 Steven Mitchell; 17 Vyncint Smith; Tight ends (TE): 88 Jordan Akins; 84 Ryan Griffin; 83 Jordan Thomas	Offensive linemen (OL): 70 Julién Davenport T; 73 Zach Fulton G; 63 Roderick Johnson T; 64 Senio Kelemete G; 74 Kendall Lamm T; 65 Greg Mancz C; 66 Nick Martin C; 75 Martinas Rankin T; Defensive linemen (DL): 97 Angelo Blackson DE; 95 Christian Covington DE; 92 Brandon Dunn NT; 93 Joel Heath DE; 98 D. J. Reader NT; 91 Carlos Watkins DE; 99 J. J. Watt DE	Linebackers (LB): 50 Tyrell Adams ILB; 90 Jadeveon Clowney OLB; 51 Dylan Cole ILB; 41 Zach Cunningham ILB; 53 Duke Ejiofor OLB; 58 Peter Kalambayi OLB; 49 Josh Keyes ILB; 55 Benardrick McKinney ILB; 59 Whitney Mercilus OLB; Defensive backs (DB): 23 Johnson Bademosi CB; 39 Deante Burton CB; 22 Aaron Colvin CB; 29 Andre Hal FS; 25 Kareem Jackson SS; 24 Johnathan Joseph CB; 32 Tyrann Mathieu FS; 33 A. J. Moore SS; 20 Justin Reid SS; 34 Mike Tyson CB; 43 Shareece Wright CB; Special teams (ST): 8 Trevor Daniel P; 7 Kaʻimi Fairbairn K; 46 Jon Weeks LS	Practice squad: 89 Jerell Adams TE; 48 Davin Bellamy OLB; 12 Amba Etta-Tawo WR; 40 Josh Ferguson RB; 31 Michael Hunter CB; 42 Chris Landrum OLB; 61 Maurquice Shakir G; 62 Chad Slade G; 79 David Steinmetz RT; 86 Jester Weah WR (PS/I); 19 Isaac Whitney WR; Reserve: 15 Will Fuller WR (IR); 76 Seantrel Henderson LT (IR); 30 Kevin Johnson CB (IR); 35 Jermaine Kelly CB (IR); 52 Brian Peters ILB (IR); 57 Brennan Scarlett OLB (IR); 87 Demaryius Thomas WR (IR); 36 Kayvon Webster CB (IR); Rookies in italics 53 active, 9 reserve, 10 practice squad

== NFL Top 100 ==
Rank	Player	Position	Change
13	DeAndre Hopkins	WR	NR
32	Jadeveon Clowney	OLB	▲17
50	Deshaun Watson	QB	NR
84	J. J. Watt	DE	▼49

== Preseason ==
Week	Date	Opponent	Result	Record	Venue	Recap
1	August 9	at Kansas City Chiefs	W 17–10	1–0	Arrowhead Stadium	Recap
2	August 18	San Francisco 49ers	W 16–13	2–0	NRG Stadium	Recap
3	August 25	at Los Angeles Rams	L 20–21	2–1	Los Angeles Memorial Coliseum	Recap
4	August 30	Dallas Cowboys	W 14–6	3–1	NRG Stadium	Recap

== Regular season ==
=== Schedule ===
Week	Date	Opponent	Result	Record	Venue	Recap
1	September 9	at New England Patriots	**L** 20–27	0–1	Gillette Stadium	Recap
2	September 16	at **Tennessee Titans**	**L** 17–20	0–2	Nissan Stadium	Recap
3	September 23	New York Giants	**L** 22–27	0–3	NRG Stadium	Recap
4	September 30	at **Indianapolis Colts**	**W** 37–34 (OT)	1–3	Lucas Oil Stadium	Recap
5	October 7	Dallas Cowboys	**W** 19–16 (OT)	2–3	NRG Stadium	Recap
6	October 14	Buffalo Bills	**W** 20–13	3–3	NRG Stadium	Recap
7	October 21	at **Jacksonville Jaguars**	**W** 20–7	4–3	TIAA Bank Field	Recap
8	October 25	Miami Dolphins	**W** 42–23	5–3	NRG Stadium	Recap
9	November 4	at Denver Broncos	**W** 19–17	6–3	Broncos Stadium at Mile High	Recap
10	Bye					
11	November 18	at Washington Redskins	**W** 23–21	7–3	FedEx Field	Recap
12	November 26	**Tennessee Titans**	**W** 34–17	8–3	NRG Stadium	Recap
13	December 2	Cleveland Browns	**W** 29–13	9–3	NRG Stadium	Recap
14	December 9	**Indianapolis Colts**	**L** 21–24	9–4	NRG Stadium	Recap
15	December 15	at New York Jets	**W** 29–22	10–4	MetLife Stadium	Recap
16	December 23	at Philadelphia Eagles	**L** 30–32	10–5	Lincoln Financial Field	Recap
17	December 30	**Jacksonville Jaguars**	**W** 20–3	11–5	NRG Stadium	Recap

Note: Intra-division opponents are in bold text.

=== Game summaries ===
==== Week 1: at New England Patriots ====
Week One: Houston Texans at New England Patriots – Game summary

Quarter	1	2	3	4	Total
Texans	3	3	7	7	**20**
**Patriots**	7	14	3	3	**27**

at Gillette Stadium, Foxborough, Massachusetts

- Date: September 9
- Game time: 1:00 p.m. EDT/12:00 p.m. CDT
- Game weather: 62 °F (17 °C), cloudy and cool
- Game attendance: 65,878
- Referee: Tony Corrente
- TV announcers (CBS): Jim Nantz, Tony Romo and Tracy Wolfson
- Recap, Gamebook

Game information

**First quarter**

- NE – Rob Gronkowski 21-yard pass from Tom Brady (Stephen Gostkowski kick), 11:50. Patriots 7–0. **Drive: 3 plays, 19 yards, 1:08.**
- HOU – Kaʻimi Fairbairn 42-yard field goal, 2:33. Patriots 7–3. **Drive: 4 plays, -7 yards, 1:33.**

**Second quarter**

- NE – James White 12-yard pass from Tom Brady (Stephen Gostkowski kick), 12:38. Patriots 14–3. **Drive: 10 plays, 75 yards, 4:55.**
- HOU – Kaʻimi Fairbairn 36-yard field goal, 9:01. Patriots 14–6. **Drive: 9 plays, 44 yards, 3:37.**
- NE – Phillip Dorsett 4-yard pass from Tom Brady (Stephen Gostkowski kick), 0:14. Patriots 21–6. **Drive: 8 plays, 78 yards, 1:14.**

**Third quarter**

- NE – Stephen Gostkowski 39-yard field goal, 6:02. Patriots 24–6. **Drive: 10 plays, 63 yards, 3:50.**
- HOU – Alfred Blue 1-yard run (Kaʻimi Fairbairn kick), 1:52. Patriots 24–13. **Drive: 10 plays, 68 yards, 4:10.**

**Fourth quarter**

- NE – Stephen Gostkowski 35-yard field goal, 9:48. Patriots 27–13. **Drive: 13 plays, 58 yards, 7:04.**
- HOU – Bruce Ellington 5-yard pass from Deshaun Watson (Kaʻimi Fairbairn kick), 2:08. Patriots 27–20. **Drive: 6 plays, 16 yards, 2:24.**

**Top passers**

- HOU – Deshaun Watson – 17/34, 176 yards, TD, INT
- NE – Tom Brady – 26/39, 277 yards, 3 TD, INT

**Top rushers**

- HOU – Lamar Miller – 20 carries, 98 yards
- NE – Rex Burkhead – 18 carries, 64 yards

**Top receivers**

- HOU – DeAndre Hopkins – 8 receptions, 78 yards
- NE – Rob Gronkowski – 7 receptions, 123 yards, TD

Safety Tyrann Mathieu, who signed with the Texans in the offseason, intercepted a Tom Brady pass that was tipped by Angelo Blackson in the 1st quarter.

==== Week 2: at Tennessee Titans ====
Week Two: Houston Texans at Tennessee Titans – Game summary

Quarter	1	2	3	4	Total
Texans	0	7	3	7	**17**
**Titans**	14	0	0	6	**20**

at Nissan Stadium, Nashville, Tennessee

- Date: September 16
- Game time: 12:00 p.m. CDT
- Game weather: 81 °F (27 °C), cloudy
- Game attendance: 62,372
- Referee: Pete Morelli
- TV announcers (CBS): Andrew Catalon and James Lofton
- Recap, Gamebook

Game information

**First quarter**

- TEN – Dane Cruikshank 66-yard pass from Kevin Byard (Ryan Succop kick), 9:51. Titans 7–0. **Drive: 5 plays, 84 yards, 2:14.**
- TEN – Taywan Taylor 18-yard pass from Blaine Gabbert (Ryan Succop kick), 0:35. Titans 14–0. **Drive: 9 plays, 56 yards, 4:35.**

**Second quarter**

- HOU – DeAndre Hopkins 28-yard pass from Deshaun Watson (Kaʻimi Fairbairn kick), 0:58. Titans 14–7. **Drive: 6 plays, 53 yards, 2:30.**

**Third quarter**

- HOU – Kaʻimi Fairbairn 34-yard field goal, 2:44. Titans 14–10. **Drive: 9 plays, 36 yards, 4:00.**

**Fourth quarter**

- HOU – Will Fuller 39-yard pass from Deshaun Watson (Kaʻimi Fairbairn kick), 13:25. Texans 17–14. **Drive: 5 plays, 70 yards, 1:43.**
- TEN – Ryan Succop 42-yard field goal, 9:48. Tied 17–17. **Drive: 8 plays, 51 yards, 3:37.**
- TEN – Ryan Succop 31-yard field goal, 1:05. Titans 20–17. **Drive: 12 plays, 62 yards, 5:41.**

**Top passers**

- HOU – Deshaun Watson – 22/32, 310 yards, 2 TD, INT
- TEN – Blaine Gabbert – 13/20, 117 yards, TD

**Top rushers**

- HOU – Lamar Miller – 14 carries, 68 yards
- TEN – Derrick Henry – 18 carries, 56 yards

**Top receivers**

- HOU – Will Fuller – 8 receptions, 113 yards, TD
- TEN – Dane Cruikshank – 1 reception, 66 yards, TD

==== Week 3: vs. New York Giants ====
Week Three: New York Giants at Houston Texans – Game summary

Quarter	1	2	3	4	Total
**Giants**	7	13	0	7	**27**
Texans	3	3	3	13	**22**

at NRG Stadium, Houston, Texas

- Date: September 23
- Game time: 12:00 p.m. CDT
- Game weather: Played indoors (retractable roof closed)
- Game attendance: 71,838
- Referee: Walt Coleman
- TV announcers (Fox): Kenny Albert, Ronde Barber and Megan Olivi
- Recap, Gamebook

Game information

**First quarter**

- HOU – Kaʻimi Fairbairn 23-yard field goal, 10:12. Texans 3–0. **Drive: 11 plays, 69 yards, 4:50.**
- NYG – Saquon Barkley 15-yard run (Aldrick Rosas kick), 4:10. Giants 7–3. **Drive: 10 plays, 75 yards, 6:00.**

**Second quarter**

- NYG – Aldrick Rosas 44-yard field goal, 11:53. Giants 10–3. **Drive: 9 plays, 58 yards, 5:14.**
- NYG – Aldrick Rosas 30-yard field goal, 4:38. Giants 13–3. **Drive: 10 plays, 64 yards, 5:59.**
- NYG – Rhett Ellison 16-yard pass from Eli Manning (Aldrick Rosas kick), 1:20. Giants 20–3. **Drive: 6 plays, 71 yards, 1:56.**
- HOU – Kaʻimi Fairbairn 28-yard field goal, 0:04. Giants 20–6. **Drive: 9 plays, 65 yards, 1:20.**

**Third quarter**

- HOU – Kaʻimi Fairbairn 54-yard field goal, 8:46. Giants 20–9. **Drive: 7 plays, 41 yards, 3:13.**

**Fourth quarter**

- HOU – Will Fuller 6-yard pass from Deshaun Watson (two-point conversion failed), 7:43. Giants 20–15. **Drive: 7 plays, 67 yards, 3:32.**
- NYG – Sterling Shepard 7-yard pass from Eli Manning (Aldrick Rosas kick), 2:08. Giants 27–15. **Drive: 9 plays, 77 yards, 5:29.**
- HOU – Lamar Miller 4-yard pass from Deshaun Watson (Kaʻimi Fairbairn kick), 0:01. Giants 27–22. **Drive: 12 plays, 75 yards, 2:07.**

**Top passers**

- NYG – Eli Manning – 25/29, 297 yards, 2 TD
- HOU – Deshaun Watson – 24/40, 385 yards, 2 TD, INT

**Top rushers**

- NYG – Saquon Barkley – 17 carries, 82 yards, TD
- HOU – Deshaun Watson – 5 carries, 36 yards

**Top receivers**

- NYG – Odell Beckham Jr. – 9 receptions, 109 yards
- HOU – Will Fuller – 5 receptions, 101 yards, TD

With the loss, the Texans fell to 0–3 for the first time since 2008, and suffered their ninth consecutive loss dating back to Week 12 of last season. They then went on to win their next nine games.

==== Week 4: at Indianapolis Colts ====
Week Four: Houston Texans at Indianapolis Colts – Game summary

Quarter	1	2	3	4	OT	Total
**Texans**	14	7	7	3	6	**37**
Colts	7	3	7	14	3	**34**

at Lucas Oil Stadium, Indianapolis, Indiana

- Date: September 30
- Game time: 1:00 p.m. EDT/12:00 p.m. CDT
- Game weather: 73 °F (23 °C), mostly sunny — retractable roof open
- Game attendance: 57,716
- Referee: Carl Cheffers
- TV announcers (CBS): Spero Dedes and Adam Archuleta
- Recap, Gamebook

Game information

**First quarter**

- IND – Zach Pascal 4-yard pass from Andrew Luck (Adam Vinatieri kick), 11:17. Colts 7–0. **Drive: 7 plays, 75 yards, 3:43.**
- HOU – Jadeveon Clowney 0-yard fumble return (Kaʻimi Fairbairn kick), 5:19. Tied 7–7.
- HOU – Will Fuller 3-yard pass from Deshaun Watson (Kaʻimi Fairbairn kick), 1:45. Texans 14–7. **Drive: 5 plays, 52 yards, 1:27.**

**Second quarter**

- HOU – DeAndre Hopkins 5-yard pass from Deshaun Watson (Kaʻimi Fairbairn kick), 1:08. Texans 21–7. **Drive: 2 plays, 8 yards, 0:39.**
- IND – Adam Vinatieri 42-yard field goal, 0:02. Texans 21–10. **Drive: 6 plays, 46 yards, 1:06.**

**Third quarter**

- HOU – Deshaun Watson 5-yard run (Kaʻimi Fairbairn kick), 6:39. Texans 28–10. **Drive: 15 plays, 79 yards, 8:21.**
- IND – Nyheim Hines 14-yard pass from Andrew Luck (Adam Vinatieri kick), 5:21. Texans 28–17. **Drive: 5 plays, 75 yards, 1:25.**

**Fourth quarter**

- IND – Eric Ebron 5-yard pass from Andrew Luck (two-point conversion failed), 7:41. Texans 28–23. **Drive: 13 plays, 73 yards, 6:22.**
- HOU – Kaʻimi Fairbairn 40-yard field goal, 3:02. Texans 31–23. **Drive: 10 plays, 54 yards, 4:39.**
- IND – Nyheim Hines 9-yard pass from Andrew Luck (Luck pass to Rogers), 0:45. Tied 31–31. **Drive: 9 plays, 85 yards, 2:13.**

**Overtime**

- IND – Adam Vinatieri 44-yard field goal, 6:00. Colts 34–31. **Drive: 13 plays, 50 yards, 4:00.**
- HOU – Kaʻimi Fairbairn 29-yard field goal, 1:50. Tied 34–34. **Drive: 12 plays, 59 yards, 4:10.**
- HOU – Kaʻimi Fairbairn 37-yard field goal, 0:00. Texans 37–34. **Drive: 3 plays, 24 yards, 0:21.**

**Top passers**

- HOU – Deshaun Watson – 29/42, 375 yards, 2 TD, INT
- IND – Andrew Luck – 40/62, 464 yards, 4 TD

**Top rushers**

- HOU – Lamar Miller – 15 carries, 49 yards
- IND – Jordan Wilkins – 8 carries, 16 yards

**Top receivers**

- HOU – DeAndre Hopkins – 10 receptions, 169 yards, TD
- IND – T. Y. Hilton – 4 receptions, 115 yards

Win the win, the Texans improved to 1–3 and snapped a 9–game losing streak. Rookie wide receiver Keke Coutee made his NFL debut, finishing with 11 receptions for 109 yards. Coutee's 11 receptions are the most by a rookie receiver since the AFL–NFL merger.

==== Week 5: vs. Dallas Cowboys ====
Week Five: Dallas Cowboys at Houston Texans – Game summary

Quarter	1	2	3	4	OT	Total
Cowboys	6	0	7	3	0	**16**
**Texans**	0	10	3	3	3	**19**

at NRG Stadium, Houston, Texas

- Date: October 7
- Game time: 7:20 p.m. CDT
- Game weather: Played indoors (retractable roof closed)
- Game attendance: 72,008
- Referee: Bill Vinovich
- TV announcers (NBC): Al Michaels, Cris Collinsworth, Michele Tafoya and Terry McAulay
- Recap, Gamebook

Game information

**First quarter**

- DAL – Brett Maher 27-yard field goal, 10:06. Cowboys 3–0. **Drive: 9 plays, 66 yards, 4:54.**
- DAL – Brett Maher 43-yard field goal, 3:13. Cowboys 6–0. **Drive: 5 plays, 37 yards, 2:35.**

**Second quarter**

- HOU – Keke Coutee 1-yard pass from Deshaun Watson (Kaʻimi Fairbairn kick), 13:40. Texans 7–6. **Drive: 8 plays, 70 yards, 4:30.**
- HOU – Kaʻimi Fairbairn 20-yard field goal, 6:03. Texans 10–6. **Drive: 12 plays, 79 yards, 5:54.**

**Third quarter**

- DAL – Allen Hurns 3-yard pass from Dak Prescott (Brett Maher kick), 11:57. Cowboys 13–10. **Drive: 5 plays, 16 yards, 1:59.**
- HOU – Kaʻimi Fairbairn 21-yard field goal, 5:05. Tied 13–13. **Drive: 8 plays, 26 yards, 2:50.**

**Fourth quarter**

- HOU – Kaʻimi Fairbairn 19-yard field goal, 8:34. Texans 16–13. **Drive: 9 plays, 59 yards, 4:55.**
- DAL – Bret Maher 48-yard field goal, 5:43. Tied 16–16. **Drive: 5 plays, 45 yards, 2:48.**

**Overtime**

- HOU – Kaʻimi Fairbairn 36-yard field goal, 1:55. Texans 19–16. **Drive: 8 plays, 72 yards, 3:38.**

**Top passers**

- DAL – Dak Prescott – 18/29, 208 yards, TD, 2 INT
- HOU – Deshaun Watson – 33/44, 375 yards, TD, INT

**Top rushers**

- DAL – Ezekiel Elliott – 20 carries, 54 yards
- HOU – Alfred Blue – 20 carries, 46 yards

**Top receivers**

- DAL – Geoff Swaim – 3 receptions, 55 yards
- HOU – DeAndre Hopkins – 9 receptions, 151 yards

==== Week 6: vs. Buffalo Bills ====
Battle Red Day

Week Six: Buffalo Bills at Houston Texans – Game summary

Quarter	1	2	3	4	Total
Bills	0	0	6	7	**13**
**Texans**	7	3	0	10	**20**

at NRG Stadium, Houston, Texas

- Date: October 14
- Game time: 12:00 p.m. CDT
- Game weather: Played indoors (retractable roof closed)
- Game attendance: 71,638
- Referee: Craig Wrolstad
- TV announcers (CBS): Andrew Catalon and James Lofton
- Recap, Gamebook

Game information

**First quarter**

- HOU – DeAndre Hopkins 13-yard pass from Deshaun Watson (Kaʻimi Fairbairn kick), 4:43. Texans 7–0. **Drive: 5 plays, 29 yards, 2:52.**

**Second quarter**

- HOU – Kaʻimi Fairbairn 33-yard field goal, 8:37. Texans 10–0. **Drive: 4 plays, 7 yards, 1:40.**

**Third quarter**

- BUF – Stephen Hauschka 22-yard field goal, 10:15. Texans 10–3. **Drive: 9 plays, 26 yards, 4:08.**
- BUF – Stephen Hauschka 52-yard field goal, 2:18. Texans 10–6. **Drive: 5 plays, 45 yards, 1:13.**

**Fourth quarter**

- BUF – Zay Jones 16-yard pass from Nathan Peterman (Stephen Hauschka kick), 13:00. Bills 13–10. **Drive: 5 plays, 32 yards, 2:44.**
- HOU – Kaʻimi Fairbairn 27-yard field goal, 1:37. Tied 13–13. **Drive: 9 plays, 84 yards, 2:18.**
- HOU – Johnathan Joseph 28-yard interception return (Kaʻimi Fairbairn kick), 1:30. Texans 20–13.

**Top passers**

- BUF – Josh Allen – 10/17, 84 yards
- HOU – Deshaun Watson – 15/25, 177 yards, TD, 2 INT

**Top rushers**

- BUF – LeSean McCoy – 16 carries, 73 yards
- HOU – Lamar Miller – 15 carries, 46 yards

**Top receivers**

- BUF – Kelvin Benjamin – 2 receptions, 43 yards
- HOU – DeAndre Hopkins – 5 receptions, 63 yards, TD

In a low-scoring defensive battle, the Texans claimed the victory in final minutes when cornerback Johnathan Joseph intercepted a pass from Bills backup quarterback Nathan Peterman and returned it for the game-winning touchdown.

==== Week 7: at Jacksonville Jaguars ====
Week Seven: Houston Texans at Jacksonville Jaguars – Game summary

Quarter	1	2	3	4	Total
**Texans**	6	7	7	0	**20**
Jaguars	0	0	7	0	**7**

at TIAA Bank Field, Jacksonville, Florida

- Date: October 21
- Game time: 1:00 p.m. EDT/12:00 p.m. CDT
- Game weather: 68 °F (20 °C)
- Game attendance: 66,534
- Referee: Ronald Torbert
- TV announcers (CBS): Andrew Catalon and James Lofton
- Recap, Gamebook

Game information

**First quarter**

- HOU – Kaʻimi Fairbairn 44-yard field goal, 10:22. Texans 3–0. **Drive: 7 plays, 10 yards, 3:15.**
- HOU – Kaʻimi Fairbairn 48-yard field goal, 2:39. Texans 6–0. **Drive: 9 plays, 51 yards, 4:46.**

**Second quarter**

- HOU – Lamar Miller 5-yard run (Kaʻimi Fairbairn kick), 5:31. Texans 13–0. **Drive: 9 plays, 60 yards, 4:55.**

**Third quarter**

- HOU – DeAndre Hopkins 10-yard pass from Deshaun Watson (Kaʻimi Fairbairn kick), 10:50. Texans 20–0. **Drive: 2 plays, 12 yards, 0:37.**
- JAX – T. J. Yeldon 5-yard pass from Cody Kessler (Josh Lambo kick), 2:18. Texans 20–7. **Drive: 10 plays, 47 yards, 4:37.**

**Fourth quarter**

- No scoring plays

**Top passers**

- HOU – Deshaun Watson – 12/24, 139 yards, TD
- JAX – Cody Kessler – 21/30, 156 yards, TD, INT

**Top rushers**

- HOU – Lamar Miller – 22 carries, 100 yards, TD
- JAX – Blake Bortles – 6 carries, 30 yards

**Top receivers**

- HOU – Will Fuller – 6 receptions, 68 yards
- JAX – Donte Moncrief – 7 receptions, 76 yards

Lamar Miller had his first 100-yard rushing game since December 11, 2016 and also had his first rushing touchdown of the season on a 5-yard run during the third quarter. Safety Tyrann Mathieu sacked Jacksonville quarterback Cody Kessler in the fourth quarter for his first sack as a Texan and also had an interception. With the win, Houston improved to 4–3, took sole possession of 1st place in the AFC South, and had their first four-game winning streak since the 2015 season.

==== Week 8: vs. Miami Dolphins ====
Week Eight: Miami Dolphins at Houston Texans – Game summary

Quarter	1	2	3	4	Total
Dolphins	7	3	10	3	**23**
**Texans**	7	7	14	14	**42**

at NRG Stadium, Houston, Texas

- Date: October 25
- Game time: 7:20 p.m. CDT
- Game weather: Played indoors (retractable roof closed)
- Game attendance: 71,726
- Referee: Shawn Smith
- TV announcers (Fox/NFLN): Joe Buck, Troy Aikman, Erin Andrews and Kristina Pink
- Recap, Gamebook

Game information

**First quarter**

- MIA – Kenyan Drake 12-yard run (Jason Sanders kick), 4:58. Dolphins 7–0. **Drive: 9 plays, 69 yards, 4:32.**
- HOU – Lamar Miller 2-yard run (Kaʻimi Fairbairn kick), 0:31. Tied 7–7. **Drive: 9 plays, 75 yards, 4:27.**

**Second quarter**

- HOU – Jordan Thomas 13-yard pass from Deshaun Watson (Kaʻimi Fairbairn kick), 14:14. Texans 14–7. **Drive: 2 plays, 16 yards, 0:36.**
- MIA – Jason Sanders 37-yard field goal, 3:01. Texans 14–10. **Drive: 10 plays, 61 yards, 4:32.**

**Third quarter**

- HOU – Jordan Thomas 2-yard pass from Deshaun Watson (Kaʻimi Fairbairn kick), 11:34. Texans 21–10. **Drive: 6 plays, 75 yards, 3:26.**
- MIA – Kenyan Drake 28-yard pass from Danny Amendola (Jason Sanders kick), 4:55. Texans 21–17. **Drive: 4 plays, 51 yards, 1:46.**
- HOU – Will Fuller 73-yard pass from Deshaun Watson (Kaʻimi Fairbairn kick), 4:21. Texans 28–17. **Drive: 2 plays, 75 yards, 0:34.**
- MIA – Jason Sanders 41-yard field goal, 0:39. Texans 28–20. **Drive: 7 plays, 52 yards, 3:42.**

**Fourth quarter**

- HOU – DeAndre Hopkins 49-yard pass from Deshaun Watson (Kaʻimi Fairbairn kick), 14:49. Texans 35–20. **Drive: 2 plays, 49 yards, 0:47.**
- MIA – Jason Sanders 46-yard field goal, 11:30. Texans 35–23. **Drive: 7 plays, 46 yards, 3:19.**
- HOU – DeAndre Hopkins 2-yard pass from Deshaun Watson (Kaʻimi Fairbairn kick), 7:34. Texans 42–23. **Drive: 6 plays, 45 yards, 3:52.**

**Top passers**

- MIA – Brock Osweiler – 21/37, 241 yards, INT
- HOU – Deshaun Watson – 16/20, 239 yards, 5 TD

**Top rushers**

- MIA – Kenyan Drake – 12 carries, 58 yards, TD
- HOU – Lamar Miller – 18 carries, 133 yards, TD

**Top receivers**

- MIA – DeVante Parker – 6 receptions, 134 yards
- HOU – Will Fuller – 5 receptions, 124 yards, TD

Quarterback Deshaun Watson threw five touchdowns (tying a career high) while only having four incompletions with no interceptions. Lamar Miller had another 100-yard rushing game for the second week in a row, running for 133 yards with a touchdown. With the win, the Texans improved to 5–3 and surpassed their win total from the previous season. Receiver Will Fuller tore his right ACL during the game and is expected to be out for 6 to 9 months.

==== Week 9: at Denver Broncos ====
Week Nine: Houston Texans at Denver Broncos – Game summary

Quarter	1	2	3	4	Total
**Texans**	7	9	0	3	**19**
Broncos	3	7	7	0	**17**

at Broncos Stadium at Mile High, Denver, Colorado

- Date: November 4
- Game time: 3:05 p.m. CST/2:05 p.m. MST
- Game weather: 53 °F (12 °C), cloudy
- Game attendance: 76,270
- Referee: Clay Martin
- TV announcers (CBS): Tom McCarthy and Steve Beuerlein
- Recap, Gamebook

Game information

**First quarter**

- HOU – Jordan Thomas 7-yard pass from Deshaun Watson (Kaʻimi Fairbairn kick), 10:53. Texans 7–0. **Drive: 8 plays, 75 yards, 4:07.**
- DEN – Brandon McManus 44-yard field goal, 4:47. Texans 7–3. **Drive: 8 plays, 25 yards, 3:07.**

**Second quarter**

- HOU – DeAndre Hopkins 16-yard pass from Deshaun Watson (PAT failed), 11:05. Texans 13–3. **Drive: 3 plays, 22 yards, 1:19.**
- DEN – Devontae Booker 14-yard run (Brandon McManus kick), 5:33. Texans 13–10. **Drive: 4 plays, 87 yards, 2:30.**
- HOU – Kaʻimi Fairbairn 46-yard field goal, 0:00. Texans 16–10. **Drive: 3 plays, 20 yards, 0:18.**

**Third quarter**

- DEN – Jeff Heuerman 12-yard pass from Case Keenum (Brandon McManus kick), 5:57. Broncos 17–16. **Drive: 12 plays, 81 yards, 5:56.**

**Fourth quarter**

- HOU – Kaʻimi Fairbairn 37-yard field goal, 14:06. Texans 19–17. **Drive: 13 plays, 56 yards, 6:51.**

**Top passers**

- HOU – Deshaun Watson – 17/24, 213 yards, 2 TD
- DEN – Case Keenum – 26/42, 290 yards, TD

**Top rushers**

- HOU – Alfred Blue – 15 carries, 39 yards
- DEN – Phillip Lindsay – 17 carries, 60 yards

**Top receivers**

- HOU – DeAndre Hopkins – 10 receptions, 105 yards, TD
- DEN – Jeff Heuerman – 10 receptions, 83 yards, TD

With the close win, the Texans improved to 6–3. They are the first team since the 1970 Giants to win 6 in a row after starting 0–3.

==== Week 11: at Washington Redskins ====
Week Eleven: Houston Texans at Washington Redskins – Game summary

Quarter	1	2	3	4	Total
**Texans**	10	7	3	3	**23**
Redskins	0	7	7	7	**21**

at FedEx Field, Landover, Maryland

- Date: November 18
- Game time: 1:00 p.m. EST/12:00 p.m. CST
- Game weather: 48 °F (9 °C), cloudy
- Game attendance: 61,593
- Referee: Alex Kemp
- TV announcers (CBS): Greg Gumbel, Trent Green, and Melanie Collins
- Recap, Gamebook

Game information

**First quarter**

- HOU – Kaʻimi Fairbairn 23-yard field goal, 9:34. Texans 3–0. **Drive: 10 plays, 68 yards, 4:36.**
- HOU – DeAndre Hopkins 16-yard pass from Deshaun Watson (Kaʻimi Fairbairn kick), 3:15. Texans 10–0. **Drive: 6 plays, 69 yards, 3:13.**

**Second quarter**

- WAS – Adrian Peterson 3-yard run (Dustin Hopkins kick), 14:14. Texans 10–7. **Drive: 10 plays, 75 yards, 4:01.**

**Third quarter**

- HOU – Justin Reid 101-yard interception return (Kaʻimi Fairbairn kick), 2:23. Texans 17–7.
- WAS – Jordan Reed 9-yard pass from Colt McCoy (Dustin Hopkins kick), 4:52. Texans 17–14. **Drive: 2 plays, 13 yards, 0:46.**
- HOU – Kaʻimi Fairbairn 33-yard field goal, 1:22. Texans 20–14. **Drive: 8 plays, 60 yards, 3:28.**

**Fourth quarter**

- WAS – Adrian Peterson 7-yard run (Dustin Hopkins kick), 11:57. Redskins 21–20. **Drive: 10 plays, 67 yards, 4:22.**
- HOU – Kaʻimi Fairbairn 54-yard field goal, 7:30. Texans 23–21. **Drive: 8 plays, 37 yards, 4:27.**

**Top passers**

- HOU – Deshaun Watson – 16/24, 208 yards, TD, 2 INT
- WAS – Alex Smith – 12/27, 135 yards, 2 INT

**Top rushers**

- HOU – Lamar Miller – 20 carries, 86 yards
- WAS – Adrian Peterson – 16 carries, 51 yards, 2 TD

**Top receivers**

- HOU – Keke Coutee – 5 receptions, 77 yards
- WAS – Jordan Reed – 7 receptions, 71 yards, TD

With another close win, the Texans improved to 7–3, their best start since 2012. They also tied their longest win streak in franchise history at 7 straight, which they previously accomplished in 2011. This is the second straight game that the Texans have won thanks to a missed last second field goal.

==== Week 12: vs. Tennessee Titans ====
Week Twelve: Tennessee Titans at Houston Texans – Game summary

Quarter	1	2	3	4	Total
Titans	10	0	7	0	**17**
**Texans**	7	17	3	7	**34**

at NRG Stadium, Houston, Texas

- Date: November 26
- Game time: 7:15 p.m. CST
- Game weather: Played indoors (retractable roof closed)
- Game attendance: 71,826
- Referee: Craig Wrolstad
- TV announcers (ESPN): Joe Tessitore, Jason Witten, Booger McFarland and Lisa Salters
- Recap, Gamebook

Game information

**First quarter**

- TEN – Ryan Succop 31-yard field goal, 11:50. Titans 3–0. **Drive: 6 plays, 62 yards, 3:13.**
- TEN – Jonnu Smith 61-yard pass from Marcus Mariota (Ryan Succop kick), 9:21. Titans 10–0. **Drive: 2 plays, 69 yards, 0:47.**
- HOU – Demaryius Thomas 12-yard pass from Deshaun Watson (Kaʻimi Fairbairn kick), 5:21. Titans 10–7. **Drive: 7 plays, 62 yards, 4:00.**

**Second quarter**

- HOU – Deshaun Watson 15-yard run (Kaʻimi Fairbarin kick), 14:53. Texans 14–10. **Drive: 5 plays, 60 yards, 1:58.**
- HOU – Lamar Miller 97-yard run (Kaʻimi Fairbairn kick), 9:22. Texans 21–10. **Drive: 1 play, 97 yards, 0:14.**
- HOU – Kaʻimi Fairbairn 42-yard field goal, 0:01. Texans 24–10. **Drive: 5 plays, 37 yards, 0:45.**

**Third quarter**

- HOU – Kaʻimi Fairbairn 47-yard field goal, 8:53. Texans 27–10. **Drive: 11 plays, 46 yards, 6:07.**
- TEN – Corey Davis 48-yard pass from Marcus Mariota (Ryan Succop kick), 0:13. Texans 27–17. **Drive: 3 plays, 51 yards, 1:47.**

**Fourth quarter**

- HOU – Demaryius Thomas 10-yard pass from Deshaun Watson (Kaʻimi Fairbairn kick), 8:15. Texans 34–17. **Drive: 7 plays, 60 yards, 3:24.**

**Top passers**

- TEN – Marcus Mariota – 22/23, 303 yards, 2 TD
- HOU – Deshaun Watson – 19/24, 210 yards, 2 TD

**Top rushers**

- TEN – Corey Davis – 1 carry, 39 yards
- HOU – Lamar Miller – 12 carries, 162 yards, TD

**Top receivers**

- TEN – Corey Davis – 4 receptions, 96 yards, TD
- HOU – DeAndre Hopkins – 5 receptions, 74 yards

The Texans successfully avenged their Week 2 loss to their division rival Titans. With their 8th straight win, they improved to 8–3 and eclipsed their previous franchise record for most consecutive wins. Coupled with a Steelers loss to the Denver Broncos the day before, the Texans' victory allowed them to leapfrog the Steelers for the No. 3 seed in the AFC.

This game was the first game following the death of the owner and founder Bob McNair and the team has dedicated the victory to him.

==== Week 13: vs. Cleveland Browns ====
Week Thirteen: Cleveland Browns at Houston Texans – Game summary

Quarter	1	2	3	4	Total
Browns	0	0	7	6	**13**
**Texans**	10	13	3	3	**29**

at NRG Stadium, Houston, Texas

- Date: December 2
- Game time: 12:00 p.m. CST
- Game weather: Played indoors (retractable roof closed)
- Game attendance: 71,741
- Referee: Walt Coleman
- TV announcers (CBS): Greg Gumbel, Trent Green, Bruce Arians and Melanie Collins
- Recap, Gamebook

Game information

**First quarter**

- HOU – Kaʻimi Fairbairn 35-yard field goal, 8:12. Texans 3–0. **Drive: 13 plays, 63 yards, 6:48.**
- HOU – Jordan Thomas 11-yard pass from Deshaun Watson (Kaʻimi Fairbairn kick), 0:38. Texans 10–0. **Drive: 10 plays, 82 yards, 5:38.**

**Second quarter**

- HOU – Zach Cunningham 38-yard interception return (Kaʻimi Fairbairn kick), 7:36. Texans 17–0.
- HOU – Kaʻimi Fairbairn 42-yard field goal, 3:24. Texans 20–0. **Drive: 7 plays, 27 yards, 3:13.**
- HOU – Kaʻimi Fairbairn 48-yard field goal, 0:05. Texans 23–0. **Drive: 10 plays, 50 yards, 1:39.**

**Third quarter**

- CLE – Nick Chubb 2-yard run (Greg Joseph kick), 9:42. Texans 23–7. **Drive: 9 plays, 75 yards, 5:21.**
- HOU – Kaʻimi Fairbairn 53-yard field goal, 5:31. Texans 26–7. **Drive: 9 plays, 40 yards, 4:13.**

**Fourth quarter**

- HOU – Kaʻimi Fairbairn 38-yard field goal, 5:50. Texans 29–7. **Drive: 8 plays, 44 yards, 3:59.**
- CLE – Rashard Higgins 17-yard pass from Baker Mayfield (pass failed), 2:58. Texans 29–13. **Drive: 9 plays, 75 yards, 2:48.**

**Top passers**

- CLE – Baker Mayfield – 29/43, 397 yards, TD, 3 INT
- HOU – Deshaun Watson – 22/31, 224 yards, TD

**Top rushers**

- CLE – Nick Chubb – 9 carries, 31 yards, TD
- HOU – Lamar Miller – 19 carries, 103 yards

**Top receivers**

- CLE – Jarvis Landry – 6 receptions, 103 yards
- HOU – DeAndre Hopkins – 7 receptions, 91 yards

The Houston Texans were going for their ninth win in a row against Baker Mayfield and the Cleveland Browns who the week before defeated the Bengals. The Texans were able to outplay the Browns en route to their ninth straight win and forced the Browns to turn the ball over four times including three interceptions by Baker Mayfield.

==== Week 14: vs. Indianapolis Colts ====
Week Fourteen: Indianapolis Colts at Houston Texans – Game summary

Quarter	1	2	3	4	Total
**Colts**	0	17	7	0	**24**
Texans	7	0	7	7	**21**

at NRG Stadium, Houston, Texas

- Date: December 9
- Game time: 12:00 p.m. CST
- Game weather: Played indoors (retractable roof closed)
- Game attendance: 71,814
- Referee: Bill Vinovich
- TV announcers (CBS): Kevin Harlan, Rich Gannon and Steve Tasker
- Recap, Gamebook

Game information

**First quarter**

- HOU – Alfred Blue 3-yard run (Kaʻimi Fairbairn kick), 2:26. Texans 7–0. **Drive: 10 plays, 82 yards, 4:09.**

**Second quarter**

- IND – Marlon Mack 4-yard run (Adam Vinatieri kick), 6:33. Tied 7–7. **Drive: 2 plays, 64 yards, 0:46.**
- IND – Eric Ebron 14-yard pass from Andrew Luck (Adam Vinatieri kick), 2:57. Colts 14–7. **Drive: 5 plays, 66 yards, 2:16.**
- IND – Adam Vinatieri 54-yard field goal, 0:04. Colts 17–7. **Drive: 10 plays, 53 yards, 1:14.**

**Third quarter**

- HOU – Lamar Miller 1-yard run (Kaʻimi Fairbairn kick), 7:38. Colts 17–14. **Drive: 16 plays, 75 yards, 7:22.**
- IND – Zach Pascal 12-yard pass from Andrew Luck (Adam Vinatieri kick), 3:51. Colts 24–14. **Drive: 8 plays, 75 yards, 3:47.**

**Fourth quarter**

- HOU – DeAndre Hopkins 7-yard pass from Deshaun Watson (Kaʻimi Fairbairn kick), 2:37. Colts 24–21. **Drive: 6 plays, 70 yards, 1:53.**

**Top passers**

- IND – Andrew Luck – 27/41, 399 yards, 2 TD, 1 INT
- HOU – Deshaun Watson – 27/38, 267 yards, 1 TD

**Top rushers**

- IND – Marlon Mack – 14 carries, 33 yards, 1 TD
- HOU – Deshaun Watson – 5 carries, 35 yards

**Top receivers**

- IND – T. Y. Hilton – 9 receptions, 199 yards
- HOU – Ryan Griffin – 5 receptions, 80 yards

With the loss, the Texans 9-game winning streak was snapped. They also squandered an opportunity to move ahead of the Patriots for the No. 2 seed as the Patriots suffered a loss of their own to the Miami Dolphins.

==== Week 15: at New York Jets ====
Week Fifteen: Houston Texans at New York Jets – Game summary

Quarter	1	2	3	4	Total
**Texans**	3	13	0	13	**29**
Jets	3	6	6	7	**22**

at MetLife Stadium, East Rutherford, New Jersey

- Date: December 15
- Game time: 4:30 p.m. EST/3:30 p.m. CST
- Game weather: 51 °F (11 °C), cloudy
- Game attendance: 77,982
- Referee: Brad Allen
- TV announcers (NFLN): Curt Menefee, Steve Mariucci, Nate Burleson and Melissa Stark
- Recap, Gamebook

Game information

**First quarter**

- HOU – Kaʻimi Fairbairn 41-yard field goal, 9:23. Texans 3–0. **Drive: 8 plays, 37 yards, 3:31.**
- NYJ – Jason Myers 26-yard field goal, 2:01. Tied 3–3. **Drive: 13 plays, 67 yards, 7:22.**

**Second quarter**

- HOU – Kaʻimi Fairbairn 32-yard field goal, 12:51. Texans 6–3. **Drive: 10 plays, 60 yards, 4:10.**
- HOU – DeAndre Hopkins 45-yard pass from Deshaun Watson (Kaʻimi Fairbairn kick), 8:14. Texans 13–3. **Drive: 2 plays, 46 yards, 0:40.**
- HOU – Kaʻimi Fairbairn 53-yard field goal, 4:35. Texans 16–3. **Drive: 5 plays, 34 yards, 2:05.**
- NYJ – Robby Anderson 5-yard pass from Sam Darnold (Jason Myers PAT failed), 0:30. Texans 16–9. **Drive: 9 plays, 83 yards, 4:05.**

**Third quarter**

- NYJ – Andre Roberts 13-yard pass from Sam Darnold (Jason Myers PAT failed), 8:39. Texans 16–15. **Drive: 8 plays, 60 yards, 4:10.**

**Fourth quarter**

- HOU – Kaʻimi Fairbairn 49-yard field goal, 12:33. Texans 19–15. **Drive: 8 plays, 57 yards, 3:55.**
- NYJ – Elijah McGuire 2-yard run (Jason Myers kick), 5:00. Jets 22–19. **Drive: 15 plays, 73 yards, 7:33.**
- HOU – DeAndre Hopkins 14-yard pass from Deshaun Watson (Kaʻimi Fairbairn kick), 2:15. Texans 26–22. **Drive: 7 plays, 75 yards, 2:45.**
- HOU – Kaʻimi Fairbairn 40-yard field goal, 0:54. Texans 29–22. **Drive: 4 plays, -1 yard, 0:58.**

**Top passers**

- HOU – Deshaun Watson – 22/28, 294 yards, 2 TD
- NYJ – Sam Darnold – 24/38, 253 yards, 2 TD

**Top rushers**

- HOU – Deshaun Watson – 4 carries, 26 yards
- NYJ – Elijah McGuire – 18 carries, 42 yards, TD

**Top receivers**

- HOU – DeAndre Hopkins – 10 receptions, 170 yards, 2 TD
- NYJ – Robby Anderson – 7 receptions, 96 yards, TD

With the win, the Texans improved to 10–4 and reached 10 wins for the first time since 2012, and for the first time in the Bill O'Brien era. With the Patriots loss to the Pittsburgh Steelers the next day, the Texans obtained sole possession of the No. 2 seed and now control their destiny for a first-round bye if they win their last 2 games.

==== Week 16: at Philadelphia Eagles ====
Week Sixteen: Houston Texans at Philadelphia Eagles – Game summary

Quarter	1	2	3	4	Total
Texans	0	16	0	14	**30**
**Eagles**	7	6	10	9	**32**

at Lincoln Financial Field, Philadelphia, Pennsylvania

- Date: December 23
- Game time: 1:00 p.m. EST/12:00 p.m. CST
- Game weather: 44 °F (7 °C), clear
- Game attendance: 69,696
- Referee: John Parry
- TV announcers (CBS): Ian Eagle, Dan Fouts and Evan Washburn
- Recap, Gamebook

Game information

**First quarter**

- PHI – Darren Sproles 37-yard pass from Nick Foles (Jake Elliott kick), 6:42. Eagles 7–0. **Drive: 13 plays, 77 yards, 7:04.**

**Second quarter**

- HOU – Kaʻimi Fairbairn 30-yard field goal, 14:55. Eagles 7–3. **Drive: 12 plays, 63 yards, 6:40.**
- HOU – Deshaun Watson 5-yard run (Kaʻimi Fairbairn PAT failed), 10:23. Texans 9–7. **Drive: 1 play, 5 yards, 0:04.**
- PHI – Zach Ertz 1-yard pass from Nick Foles (two-point conversion failed), 3:11. Eagles 13–9. **Drive: 14 plays, 75 yards, 7:15.**
- HOU – Deshaun Watson 6-yard run (Kaʻimi Fairbairn kick), 1:17. Texans 16–13. **Drive: 8 plays, 80 yards, 1:51.**

**Third quarter**

- PHI – Jake Elliott 47-yard field goal, 5:35. Tied 16–16. **Drive: 7 plays, 59 yards, 3:55.**
- PHI – Nelson Agholor 83-yard pass from Nick Foles (Jake Elliott kick), 2:31. Eagles 23–16. **Drive: 1 play, 83 yards, 0:14.**

**Fourth quarter**

- PHI – Zach Ertz 23-yard pass from Nick Foles (Jake Elliott kick), 10:30. Eagles 29–16. **Drive: 5 plays, 44 yards, 3:22.**
- HOU – D'Onta Foreman 20-yard pass from Deshaun Watson (Kaʻimi Fairbairn kick), 4:41. Eagles 29–23. **Drive: 5 plays, 55 yards, 0:39.**
- HOU – Vyncint Smith 35-yard pass from Deshaun Watson (Kaʻimi Fairbairn kick), 2:04. Texans 30–29. **Drive: 8 plays, 80 yards, 2:02.**
- PHI – Jake Elliott 35-yard field goal, 0:03. Eagles 32–30. **Drive: 11 plays, 72 yards, 2:01.**

**Top passers**

- HOU – Deshaun Watson – 29/40, 339 yards, 2 TD
- PHI – Nick Foles – 35/49, 471 yards, 4 TD, INT

**Top rushers**

- HOU – Deshaun Watson – 8 carries, 49 yards, 2 TD
- PHI – Darren Sproles – 9 carries, 32 yards

**Top receivers**

- HOU – DeAndre Hopkins – 9 receptions, 104 yards
- PHI – Nelson Agholor – 5 receptions, 116 yards, TD

The Texans traveled to Philadelphia seeking to defeat the Philadelphia Eagles for the first time in franchise history. Houston rallied from a 13-point fourth quarter deficit to take a one-point lead on a 35-yard touchdown reception by Vyncint Smith with 2:04 remaining in the game. However, the defense could not stop Philadelphia on the ensuing drive, and the Eagles prevailed 32-30 on a 35-yard field goal by Jake Elliott as time expired. With the loss, the Texans fell to 10-5 on the season and 0-5 all-time against the Eagles. Houston also failed to clinch the AFC South due to victories by the Tennessee Titans and Indianapolis Colts and slipped back to No. 3 with the New England Patriots victory over the Buffalo Bills. However, the Texans would clinch a playoff berth when the Pittsburgh Steelers lost to the New Orleans Saints later that day.

==== Week 17: vs. Jacksonville Jaguars ====
Week Seventeen: Jacksonville Jaguars at Houston Texans – Game summary

Quarter	1	2	3	4	Total
Jaguars	3	0	0	0	**3**
**Texans**	3	14	0	3	**20**

at NRG Stadium, Houston, Texas

- Date: December 30
- Game time: 12:00 p.m. CST
- Game weather: Played indoors (retractable roof closed)
- Game attendance: 71,848
- Referee: Pete Morelli
- TV announcers (CBS): Andrew Catalon, James Lofton and Jay Feely
- Recap, Gamebook

Game information

**First quarter**

- JAX – Kai Forbath 25-yard field goal, 10:08. Jaguars 3–0. **Drive: 4 plays, 3 yards, 2:00.**
- HOU – Kaʻimi Fairbairn 23-yard field goal, 5:20. Tied 3–3. **Drive: 10 plays, 69 yards, 4:48.**

**Second quarter**

- HOU – Deshaun Watson 5-yard run (Kaʻimi Fairbairn kick), 14:56. Texans 10–3. **Drive: 4 plays, 51 yards, 1:37.**
- HOU – Lamar Miller 7-yard run (Kaʻimi Fairbairn kick), 3:01. Texans 17–3. **Drive: 9 plays, 63 yards, 4:27.**

**Third quarter**

- No scoring plays

**Fourth quarter**

- HOU – Kaʻimi Fairbairn 24-yard field goal, 10:52. Texans 20–3. **Drive: 9 plays, 60 yards, 3:29.**

**Top passers**

- JAX – Blake Bortles – 15/28, 107 yards, INT
- HOU – Deshaun Watson – 25/35, 234 yards

**Top rushers**

- JAX – Blake Bortles – 4 carries, 15 yards
- HOU – Deshaun Watson – 13 carries, 66 yards, TD

**Top receivers**

- JAX – Keelan Cole – 4 receptions, 45 yards
- HOU – DeAndre Hopkins – 12 receptions, 147 yards

=== Standings ===
==== Division ====
AFC South
	W	L	T	PCT	DIV	CONF	PF	PA	STK
^{(3)} Houston Texans	11	5	0	.688	4–2	9–3	402	316	W1
^{(6)} Indianapolis Colts	10	6	0	.625	4–2	7–5	433	344	W4
Tennessee Titans	9	7	0	.563	3–3	5–7	310	303	L1
Jacksonville Jaguars	5	11	0	.313	1–5	4–8	245	316	L1

==== Conference ====
AFC
#	Team	Division	W	L	T	PCT	DIV	CONF	SOS	SOV	STK
**Division leaders**
1 (Note: Kansas City finished ahead of LA Chargers in the AFC West based on division record, claiming the No. 1 seed.)	Kansas City Chiefs	West	12	4	0	.750	5–1	10–2	.480	.401	W1
2 (Note: New England claimed the No. 2 seed over Houston based on head-to-head victory.)	New England Patriots	East	11	5	0	.688	5–1	8–4	.482	.494	W2
3	Houston Texans	South	11	5	0	.688	4–2	9–3	.471	.435	W1
4	Baltimore Ravens	North	10	6	0	.625	3–3	8–4	.496	.450	W3
**Wild Cards**
5	Los Angeles Chargers	West	12	4	0	.750	4–2	9–3	.477	.422	W1
6	Indianapolis Colts	South	10	6	0	.625	4–2	7–5	.465	.456	W4
**Did not qualify for the postseason**
7	Pittsburgh Steelers	North	9	6	1	.594	4–1–1	6–5–1	.504	.448	W1
8	Tennessee Titans	South	9	7	0	.563	3–3	5–7	.520	.465	L1
9	Cleveland Browns	North	7	8	1	.469	3–2–1	5–6–1	.516	.411	L1
10	Miami Dolphins	East	7	9	0	.438	4–2	6–6	.469	.446	L3
11 (Note: Denver finished ahead of Cincinnati and Buffalo based on strength of victory. Cincinnati finished ahead of Buffalo based on record vs. common opponents. Cincinnati's cumulative record against Baltimore, Indianapolis, the Los Angeles Chargers and Miami was 3–2, compared to Buffalo's 1–4 cumulative record against the same four teams.)	Denver Broncos	West	6	10	0	.375	2–4	4–8	.523	.464	L4
12	Cincinnati Bengals	North	6	10	0	.375	1–5	4–8	.535	.448	L2
13	Buffalo Bills	East	6	10	0	.375	2–4	4–8	.523	.411	W1
14	Jacksonville Jaguars	South	5	11	0	.313	1–5	4–8	.549	.463	L1
15 (Note: NY Jets finished ahead of Oakland based on strength of victory.)	New York Jets	East	4	12	0	.250	1–5	3–9	.506	.438	L3
16	Oakland Raiders	West	4	12	0	.250	1–5	3–9	.547	.406	L1
**Tiebreakers** (Note: When breaking ties for three or more teams under the NFL's rules, they are first broken within divisions, then comparing only the highest ranked remaining team from each division.)

== Postseason ==
=== Schedule ===
Round	Date	Opponent (seed)	Result	Record	Venue	Recap
Wild Card	January 5, 2019	Indianapolis Colts (6)	L 7–21	0–1	NRG Stadium	Recap

=== Game summaries ===
==== AFC Wild Card Playoffs: vs. (6) Indianapolis Colts ====
AFC Wild Card Playoffs: (6) Indianapolis Colts at (3) Houston Texans – Game summary

Quarter	1	2	3	4	Total
Colts	14	7	0	0	21
Texans	0	0	0	7	7

at NRG Stadium, Houston, Texas

- Date: January 5, 2019
- Game time: 3:35 p.m. CST
- Game weather: Played indoors (retractable roof closed)
- Game attendance: 71,798
- Referee: Bill Vinovich
- TV announcers (ESPN/ABC): Joe Tessitore, Jason Witten, Booger McFarland and Lisa Salters
- Recap, Gamebook

Game information

First quarter

- IND – Eric Ebron 6-yard pass from Andrew Luck (Adam Vinatieri kick), 10:37. Colts 7–0. Drive: 9 plays, 75 yards, 4:28.
- IND – Marlon Mack 2-yard run (Adam Vinatieri kick), 4:08. Colts 14–0. Drive: 9 plays, 74 yards, 5:25.

Second quarter

- IND – Dontrelle Inman 18-yard pass from Andrew Luck (Adam Vinatieri kick), 6:29. Colts 21–0. Drive: 7 plays, 65 yards, 3:23.

Third quarter

- No scoring plays.

Fourth quarter

- HOU – Keke Coutee 6-yard pass from Deshaun Watson (Kaʻimi Fairbairn kick), 11:03. Colts 21–7. Drive: 16 plays, 89 yards, 6:13.

Top passers

- IND – Andrew Luck – 19/32, 222 yards, 2 TD, INT
- HOU – Deshaun Watson – 29/49, 235 yards, TD, INT

Top rushers

- IND – Marlon Mack – 24 rushes, 148 yards, TD
- HOU – Deshaun Watson – 8 rushes, 76 yards

Top receivers

- IND – T. Y. Hilton – 5 receptions, 85 yards
- HOU – Keke Coutee – 11 receptions, 110 yards, TD

This was the first time in Houston Texans history where they played against a division opponent in the postseason. With the NFC East champion Dallas Cowboys hosting the Seattle Seahawks Saturday evening, it was also the first time in league history that two NFL playoff games were played in Texas on the same day.

== Statistics ==
=== Team ===
Category	Total yards	Yards per game	NFL rank (out of 32)
Passing offense	3,781	236.3	17th
Rushing offense	2,021	126.3	8th
Total offense	5,802	362.6	15th
Passing defense	4,167	260.4	27th
Rushing defense	1,323	82.7	3rd
Total defense	5,490	343.1	12th

=== Individual ===
Category	Player	Total
Offense
Passing yards	Deshaun Watson	4,165
Passing touchdowns	Deshaun Watson	26
Rushing yards	Lamar Miller	973
Rushing touchdowns	Lamar Miller; Deshaun Watson	5
Receiving yards	DeAndre Hopkins	1,572
Receiving touchdowns	DeAndre Hopkins	11
Defense
Tackles (Solo)	Zach Cunningham	73
Sacks	J. J. Watt	16
Interceptions	Andre Hal	3
