= David W. Butler High School =

American public school in North Carolina

Coordinates: 35.12028°N 80.69306°W

Location
- 1810 Matthews-Mint Hill Rd; Matthews, North Carolina 28105; United States

Information
- Type: Public
- Established: 1997 (29 years ago)
- School district: Charlotte-Mecklenburg Schools
- CEEB code: 342531
- Principal: Yolanda Blakeney
- Teaching staff: 98.41 (FTE)
- Grades: 9–12
- Enrollment: 1,791 (2024-2025)
- Student to teacher ratio: 18.20
- Colors: Black, red, and silver
- Athletics: NCHSAA 7A
- Athletics conference: Meck Power Six 7A/8A
- Mascot: Bulldog
- Website: butlerhs.cmsk12.org

David W. Butler High School (commonly referred to as "Butler") was established in 1997 and is located in Matthews, North Carolina, United States. Butler's campus is 74 acres (300,000 m^{2}). The mascot is the bulldog and school colors are black, red and silver. Its school boundary includes most of Matthews, and a portion of Mint Hill.

== History ==
=== School name ===
David W. Butler High School opened to students in August 1997. The school was named in honor of David Watkins Butler (1952–1997), a Charlotte-Mecklenburg teacher. Butler died of smoke inhalation after helping his wife and two children escape a house fire. As a teacher, he was known to pass out his phone number to students in need, told humorous stories, coached the boys and girls basketball teams, and was known to simply make learning fun.

=== 2018 shooting ===
At around 7:10 AM on October 29, 2018, an altercation between two students occurred in front of a main hallway known as 500. This led to one student being shot two to three times and triggering a lockdown that was lifted by 9:15 AM EDT. The victim, identified as Bobby McKeithen, was rushed to Carolinas Medical Center by helicopter, later dying of his injuries. The suspect, identified as Jatwan Cuffie, is currently out on bail and charged with second degree murder. After he shot McKeithen he came into a 500 hall classroom when the lockdown was called and turned himself in to a campus security officer minutes later, handing the gun over to him. In the weeks following, trained crisis counselors were available on campus as well as several police officers and police dogs to help keep everything safe. Although the police presence has decreased, the school has now implemented a strict security system consisting of random bag checks and metal wanding.

The school, as of May 29, 2019, set up a memorial plaque in honor of McKeithen in the main entrance on the left side. On July 25, 2019, Cuffie pled guilty to voluntary manslaughter and was sentenced to 80 to 108 months in prison.

=== Cheerleading banner controversy ===
On October 19, 2021, at the beginning of a football game against Charlotte Catholic High School, the Butler cheerleading squad displayed a banner that read "Sniff, Sniff. You smell that? $Privilege$". The Butler football team then broke through the banner as they entered the field to begin the game. Charlotte-Mecklenburg Schools stated that they were investigating the incident and stated that "Squad members and adults responsible for oversight will face consequences as a result of that banner display. [...] Principal Golden and Learning Community Superintendent Tangela Williams have spoken with leaders from Charlotte Catholic to offer verbal apologies. Butler High School cheerleaders have sent an apology letter to counterparts at Charlotte Catholic. Soon there will be a meeting between the schools’ cheerleading squads to facilitate goodwill and understanding."

== Athletics ==
Butler High School is a member of the North Carolina High School Athletic Association (NCHSAA) and is classified as a 7A school. It is a part of the Meck Power Six 7A/8A Conference.

=== Football ===
Butler's football team won three NCHSAA 4AA state championships in a four year span, during the 2009, 2010, and 2012 seasons. In 2009, Butler won its first 4AA state championship title at Carter-Finley Stadium defeating Jack Britt High School 48–17. In 2010, Butler repeated as North Carolina State 4AA Champions by defeating Rolesville High School 44–0, finishing the season on a 31-game winning streak.

In 2012, Butler again defeated Jack Britt High School 56–28 at Kenan Stadium in Chapel Hill, winning the NC 4AA state title for the 3rd time in 4 seasons. Butler finished the 2012 season undefeated and ranked number 1 in North Carolina and number 3 in the final USA Today 2012 National Super 25 Football Poll.

In June 2019, MaxPreps reported that Butler was North Carolina's "Most Dominant High School Football Program of the last 10 years."

=== Softball ===
During the 2000s, the softball team won four 4A state championships, winning in 2001, 2006, 2007, and 2008.

=== Wrestling ===
Butler's wrestling team finished 4th in the 4A dual team tournament during the 2007–2008 season. During the 2008–2009 season, Butler wrestling finished as the 4A dual team state runner-ups.

=== Girls basketball ===
Butler's girls' basketball team won the North Carolina 4A state championship in 2009–10, and went 30–0 the following season before a premature loss to Mallard Creek in the Class 4A western regional semifinals, cutting their chance at a repeat short.

== JROTC program ==
Butler's US Army JROTC program, established in 2003, has attended the Junior Reserve Officer Training Corp Drill Nationals, Raider Nationals, and Archery Nationals. The program also attends other regional and state championships in North Carolina, South Carolina, Georgia, and Virginia. The program is currently led by LTC (Ret.) Ott M. Siebert.

== Notable alumni ==
- Jamar Adams, NFL safety
- Tyler Barnhardt, actor
- Robert Blanton, NFL safety
- Jarrett Boykin, NFL and CFL wide receiver
- Cierra Burdick, former basketball player in the WNBA
- Brooklyn Decker, model and actress
- Jahwan Edwards, football running back
- Riley Ferguson, football quarterback
- Brandon Hucks, musician with Of Good Nature
- Peter Kalambayi, NFL Linebacker
- Kendall Lamm, NFL offensive tackle
- Jordan Lloyd, winner of Big Brother 11 and Big Brother 13 houseguest
- Kenneth Moore, NFL wide receiver
- Anthony Ratliff-Williams, UFL wide receiver
- Jordan Rinaldi, MMA fighter, competed in the featherweight division of the UFC
- Channing Stribling, football defensive back
