= Angelo Blackson =

American football player (born 1992)

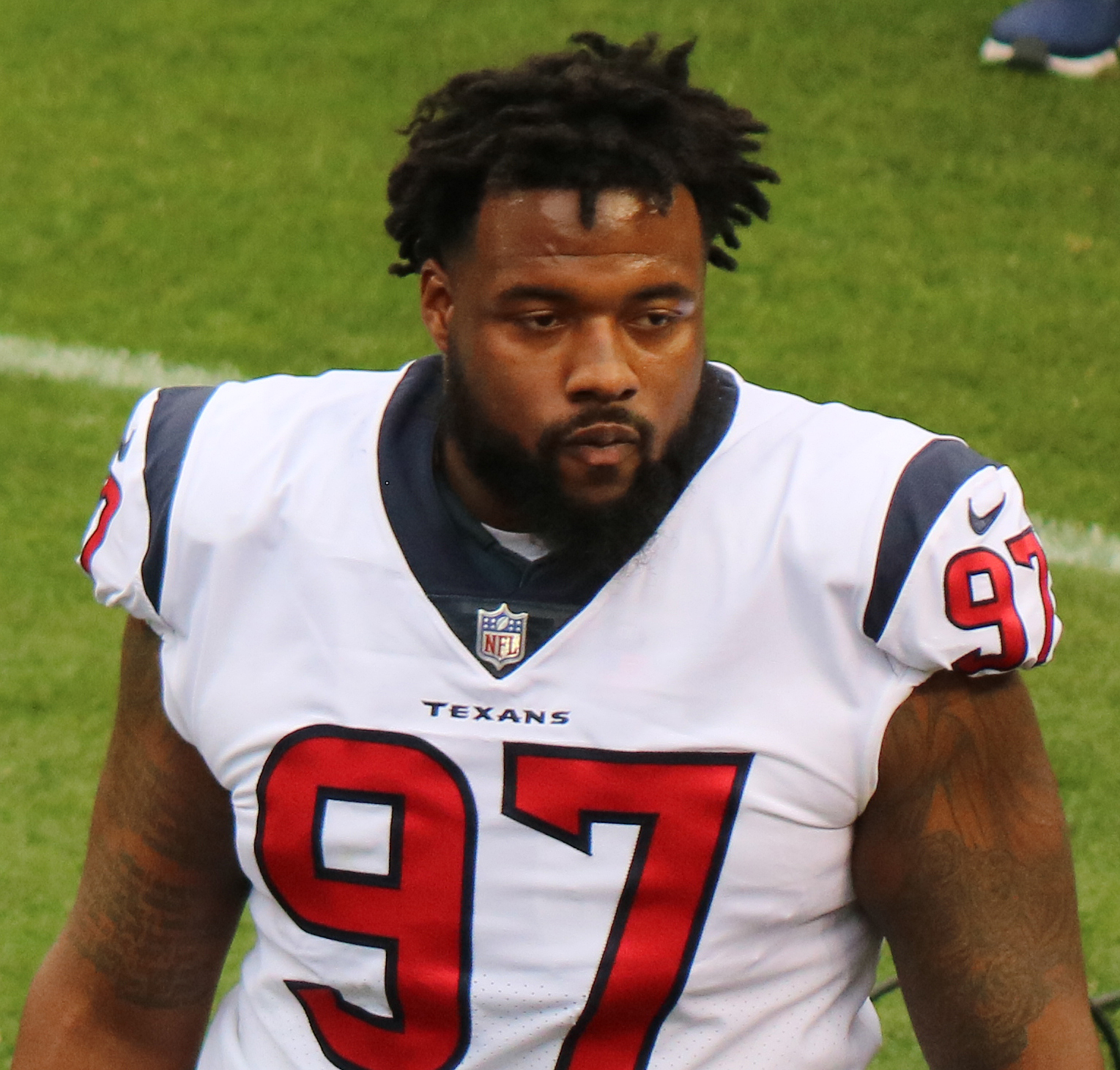
- Blackson with the Houston Texans in 2018

Profile
- Position: Defensive end

Personal information
- Born: November 14, 1992 (age 33); Wilmington, Delaware, U.S.
- Listed height: 6 ft 4 in (1.93 m)
- Listed weight: 318 lb (144 kg)

Career information
- High school: Red Lion Christian Academy (Bear, Delaware)
- College: Auburn (2011–2014)
- NFL draft: 2015: 4th round, 100th overall pick

Career history
- Tennessee Titans (2015–2016); New England Patriots (2017)*; Houston Texans (2017–2019); Arizona Cardinals (2020); Chicago Bears (2021–2022); Baltimore Ravens (2023)*; Jacksonville Jaguars (2023); Denver Broncos (2024)*; Arizona Cardinals (2024)*
- * Offseason or practice squad member only

Career NFL statistics as of 2023
- Total tackles: 179
- Sacks: 8.5
- Forced fumbles: 1
- Fumble recoveries: 4
- Pass deflections: 8
- Interceptions: 1
- Stats at Pro Football Reference

Angelo Sierre Blackson (born November 14, 1992) is an American professional football defensive end. He played college football for the Auburn Tigers and was selected by the Tennessee Titans in the fourth round of the 2015 NFL draft. He has also played in the NFL for the Houston Texans, Arizona Cardinals, Chicago Bears, and Jacksonville Jaguars.

== College career ==
Blackson attended and played college football at Auburn University from 2011 to 2014.

== Professional career ==
Pre-draft measurables
| Height | Weight | Arm length | Hand span | 40-yard dash | 10-yard split | 20-yard split | 20-yard shuttle | Three-cone drill | Vertical jump | Broad jump | Bench press |
|---|---|---|---|---|---|---|---|---|---|---|---|
| 6 ft 4 3/8 in (1.94 m) | 318 lb (144 kg) | 33 3/4 in (0.86 m) | 9 3/4 in (0.25 m) | 4.97 s | 1.72 s | 2.86 s | 4.57 s | 7.50 s | 31 in (0.79 m) | 8 ft 5 in (2.57 m) | 21 reps |
All values from NFL Combine/Pro Day

=== Tennessee Titans ===
The Tennessee Titans selected Blackson in the fourth round (100th overall) of the 2015 NFL draft.

On May 14, 2015, the Titans signed Blackson to a four-year, $2.85 million contract with a signing bonus of $571,615.

On September 2, 2017, Blackson was waived by the Titans. He finished his tenure with the Titans with 24 tackles and 2.5 sacks.

=== New England Patriots ===
On September 4, 2017, Blackson signed with the practice squad of the New England Patriots.

=== Houston Texans ===
On November 1, 2017, the Houston Texans signed Blackson off the Patriots' practice squad.

On March 11, 2019, Blackson signed a three-year, $12 million contract extension with the Texans. In Week 15 of the 2019 season, Blackson blocked a field goal in a 24–21 win over the Titans, earning AFC Special Teams Player of the Week.

On September 5, 2020, Blackson was released by the Texans.

=== Arizona Cardinals (first stint) ===
On September 8, 2020, Blackson was signed by the Arizona Cardinals.

=== Chicago Bears ===
On March 20, 2021, Blackson signed a two-year contract with the Chicago Bears.

=== Baltimore Ravens ===
On May 24, 2023, Blackson signed with the Baltimore Ravens. He was released on August 29, 2023.

=== Jacksonville Jaguars ===
Blackson was signed by the Jacksonville Jaguars on August 31, 2023.

=== Denver Broncos ===
On April 15, 2024, Blackson signed a one-year deal with the Denver Broncos. He was released on August 26.

=== Arizona Cardinals (second stint) ===
On September 10, 2024, Blackson was signed to the Arizona Cardinals practice squad.

== NFL career statistics ==
Legend
| **Bold** | Career high |

=== Regular season ===
| Year | Team | Games | | Tackles | | | | | Interceptions | | | | | Fumbles | | | |
| Year | Team | GP | GS | Cmb | Solo | Ast | Sck | TFL | Int | Yds | TD | Lng | PD | FF | FR | Yds | TD |
|---|---|---|---|---|---|---|---|---|---|---|---|---|---|---|---|---|---|
| 2015 | TEN | 16 | 0 | 15 | 8 | 7 | **2.5** | 2 | 0 | 0 | 0 | 0 | 0 | **1** | 0 | 0 | 0 |
| 2016 | TEN | 13 | 1 | 9 | 4 | 5 | 0.0 | 2 | 0 | 0 | 0 | 0 | 1 | 0 | 0 | 0 | 0 |
| 2017 | HOU | 9 | 1 | 9 | 8 | 1 | 0.0 | 0 | 0 | 0 | 0 | 0 | 1 | 0 | 0 | 0 | 0 |
| 2018 | HOU | 16 | 4 | 24 | 18 | 6 | 1.0 | 1 | 0 | 0 | 0 | 0 | **3** | 0 | 1 | 0 | 0 |
| 2019 | HOU | 15 | 15 | 20 | 11 | 9 | 0.0 | 2 | 0 | 0 | 0 | 0 | 0 | 0 | 0 | 0 | 0 |
| 2020 | ARI | 16 | 9 | 24 | 15 | 9 | **2.5** | **4** | 0 | 0 | 0 | 0 | 0 | 0 | 0 | 0 | 0 |
| 2021 | CHI | 17 | 8 | **43** | **24** | **19** | **2.5** | 3 | **1** | **6** | 0 | **6** | 2 | 0 | 0 | 0 | 0 |
| 2022 | CHI | 15 | 4 | 22 | 10 | 12 | 0.0 | 1 | 0 | 0 | 0 | 0 | 1 | 0 | 0 | 0 | 0 |
| 2023 | JAX | 11 | 0 | 13 | 8 | 5 | 0.0 | 2 | 0 | 0 | 0 | 0 | 0 | 0 | **3** | 0 | 0 |
| Career | | 128 | 42 | 179 | 106 | 73 | 8.5 | 17 | 1 | 6 | 0 | 6 | 8 | 1 | 4 | 0 | 0 |

=== Playoffs ===
| Year | Team | Games | | Tackles | | | | | Interceptions | | | | | Fumbles | | | |
| Year | Team | GP | GS | Cmb | Solo | Ast | Sck | TFL | Int | Yds | TD | Lng | PD | FF | FR | Yds | TD |
|---|---|---|---|---|---|---|---|---|---|---|---|---|---|---|---|---|---|
| 2018 | HOU | 1 | 0 | 0 | 0 | 0 | 0.0 | 0 | 0 | 0 | 0 | 0 | 0 | 0 | 0 | 0 | 0 |
| 2019 | HOU | 2 | 2 | **4** | **3** | **1** | 0.0 | 0 | 0 | 0 | 0 | 0 | 0 | 0 | 0 | 0 | 0 |
| Career | | 3 | 2 | 4 | 3 | 1 | 0.0 | 0 | 0 | 0 | 0 | 0 | 0 | 0 | 0 | 0 | 0 |
