= Jordan Thomas (American football) =

American football player (born 1996)

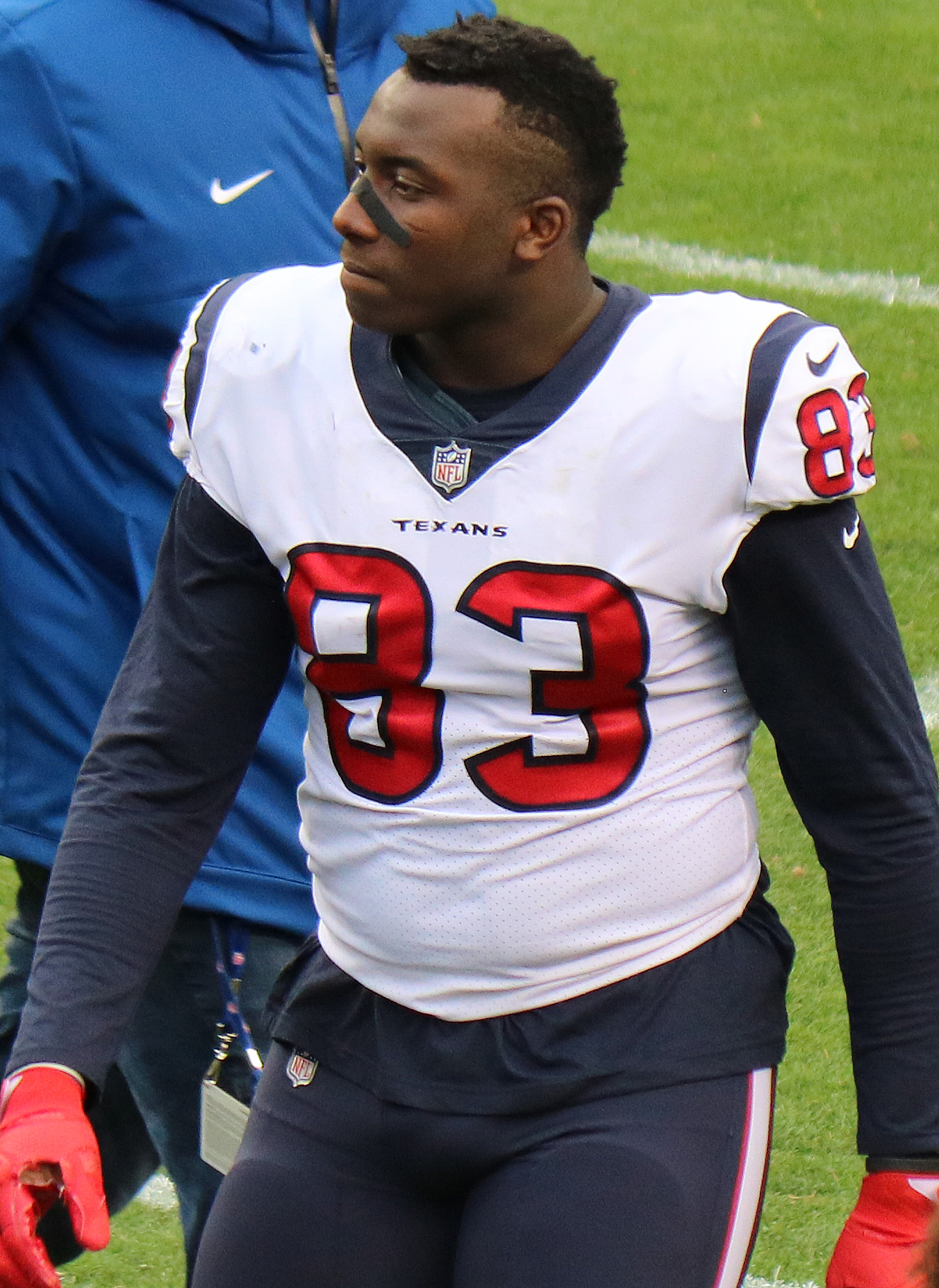
- Thomas with the Houston Texans in 2018

No. 81 – Rhode Island Breakers
- Position: Tight end
- Roster status: Active

Personal information
- Born: August 2, 1996 (age 30); Hattiesburg, Mississippi, U.S.
- Listed height: 6 ft 5 in (1.96 m)
- Listed weight: 285 lb (129 kg)

Career information
- High school: Sumrall (MS)
- College: East Central CC (2014–2015); Mississippi State (2016–2017)
- NFL draft: 2018: 6th round, 211th overall pick

Career history
- Houston Texans (2018–2019); Arizona Cardinals (2020); New England Patriots (2020); Indianapolis Colts (2021)*; Detroit Lions (2022)*; St. Louis BattleHawks (2023); Orlando Guardians (2023); Carolina Panthers (2023)*; Birmingham Stallions (2024); Atlanta Falcons (2024)*; Birmingham Stallions (2025–2026); Rhode Island Breakers (2027–present)
- * Offseason or practice squad member only

Awards and highlights
- UFL champion (2024)

Career NFL statistics
- Receptions: 22
- Receiving yards: 226
- Receiving touchdowns: 5
- Stats at Pro Football Reference

Jordan Malik Thomas (born August 2, 1996) is an American professional football tight end for the Rhode Island Breakers of the United Football League (UFL). He played college football at Mississippi State and was selected by the Houston Texans in the sixth round of the 2018 NFL draft.

== College career ==
Thomas attended and played college football at Mississippi State under head coach Dan Mullen.

=== Statistics ===
| Year | Team | Games | | Receiving | | | |
| Year | Team | GP | GS | Rec | Yds | Avg | TD |
|---|---|---|---|---|---|---|---|
| 2014 | East Central (CC) | 9 | – | 16 | 138 | 8.6 | 1 |
| 2015 | East Central (CC) | 10 | – | 18 | 226 | 12.6 | 6 |
| 2016 | Mississippi State | 12 | 0 | 9 | 48 | 5.3 | 1 |
| 2017 | Mississippi State | 13 | 5 | 22 | 263 | 12.0 | 3 |
| NJCAA Career | | 19 | – | 34 | 364 | 10.7 | 5 |
| FBS Career | | 25 | 5 | 31 | 311 | 10.0 | 4 |

== Professional career ==
Pre-draft measurables
| Height | Weight | Arm length | Hand span | Wingspan | 40-yard dash | 10-yard split | 20-yard split | 20-yard shuttle | Three-cone drill | Vertical jump | Broad jump | Bench press |
|---|---|---|---|---|---|---|---|---|---|---|---|---|
| 6 ft 5 1/2 in (1.97 m) | 265 lb (120 kg) | 34 1/8 in (0.87 m) | 11 5/8 in (0.30 m) | 6 ft 10 3/8 in (2.09 m) | 4.69 s | 1.72 s | 2.84 s | 4.64 s | 7.41 s | 29.5 in (0.75 m) | 9 ft 3 in (2.82 m) | 16 reps |
All values from NFL Combine/Pro Day

=== Houston Texans ===
Thomas was selected by the Houston Texans in the sixth round, 211th overall, of the 2018 NFL draft. In the Texans' season opener against the New England Patriots, he made his NFL debut. In the 27–20 loss, he had a single reception for 27 yards.

On October 25, 2018, in a Thursday Night Football game against the Miami Dolphins, Thomas had four catches for 29 yards and his first two touchdowns in the 42–23 victory. He played in 16 games with 10 starts, recording 20 receptions for 215 yards and four touchdowns.

On September 2, 2019, Thomas was placed on injured reserve. He was designated for return from injured reserve on November 11 and began practicing with the team again. Thomas was activated 10 days later.

On September 5, 2020, Thomas was waived by the Texans.

=== Arizona Cardinals ===
On September 8, 2020, Thomas was signed to the practice squad of the Arizona Cardinals. He was elevated to the active roster on September 19 for the team's Week 2 matchup against the Washington Football Team, and reverted to the practice squad after the game. Thomas was promoted to the active roster on September 22. He was waived on November 7.

=== New England Patriots ===
On November 10, 2020, Thomas was claimed off waivers by the Patriots. He was placed on the reserve/COVID-19 list by the team on December 26, and activated and subsequently waived from the team four days later.

=== Indianapolis Colts ===
On January 5, 2021, Thomas signed a reserve/future contract with the Indianapolis Colts. He was waived/injured on August 31, and placed on injured reserve. Thomas was released six days later.

=== Detroit Lions ===
On January 18, 2022, Thomas signed a reserve/future contract with the Detroit Lions. He was released on March 23.

=== St. Louis BattleHawks ===
On November 17, 2022, Thomas was drafted by the St. Louis BattleHawks of the XFL. He was released on March 14, 2023.

=== Orlando Guardians ===
Thomas was signed by the Orlando Guardians on March 27, 2023. He was released from his contract on May 15.

=== Carolina Panthers ===
On May 16, 2023, Thomas signed with the Carolina Panthers, being listed as a linebacker instead of tight end. On August 29, he was waived for final roster cuts, but signed to the practice squad the following day. Thomas was released on December 5.

=== Birmingham Stallions (first stint) ===
On January 19, 2024, Thomas signed with the Birmingham Stallions of the United Football League (UFL). His contract was terminated on August 1.

=== Atlanta Falcons ===
Thomas signed with the Atlanta Falcons on August 1, 2024. He was released on August 25.

=== Birmingham Stallion (second stint) ===
On August 30, 2024, Thomas re-signed with the Birmingham Stallions.

== NFL career statistics ==
Legend
| | Led the league |
| | League champion |
| **Bold** | Career high |

=== Regular season ===
| Year | Team | Games | | Receiving | | | | | Fumbles | |
| Year | Team | GP | GS | Rec | Yds | Avg | Lng | TD | Fum | Lost |
|---|---|---|---|---|---|---|---|---|---|---|
| 2018 | HOU | 16 | 10 | 20 | 215 | 10.8 | 39 | 4 | 0 | 0 |
| 2019 | HOU | 5 | 2 | 1 | 8 | 8.0 | 8 | 0 | 0 | 0 |
| 2020 | ARI | 4 | 0 | 1 | 3 | 3.0 | 3 | 1 | 0 | 0 |
| 2020 | NE | 2 | 0 | 0 | 0 | 0 | 0 | 0 | 0 | 0 |
| Career | | 27 | 12 | 22 | 226 | 10.3 | 39 | 5 | 0 | 0 |

=== Postseason ===
| Year | Team | Games | | Receiving | | | | | Fumbles | |
| Year | Team | GP | GS | Rec | Yds | Avg | Lng | TD | Fum | Lost |
|---|---|---|---|---|---|---|---|---|---|---|
| 2018 | HOU | 1 | 1 | 0 | 0 | 0.0 | 0 | 0 | 0 | 0 |
| 2019 | HOU | 2 | 0 | 1 | 7 | 7.0 | 7 | 0 | 0 | 0 |
| Career | | 3 | 1 | 1 | 7 | 7.0 | 7 | 0 | 0 | 0 |

== XFL/UFL career statistics ==
=== Regular season ===
| Year | Team | League | Games | | Receiving | | | | |
| Year | Team | League | GP | GS | Rec | Yds | Avg | Lng | TD |
|---|---|---|---|---|---|---|---|---|---|
| 2023 | STL | XFL | 1 | 0 | 0 | 0 | 0.0 | 0 | 0 |
| 2023 | ORL | XFL | 4 | **2** | **8** | **148** | 18.5 | **84T** | **3** |
| 2024 | BHAM | UFL | **10** | 0 | 4 | 75 | **18.8** | 33 | 0 |
| 2025 | BHAM | UFL | 10 | 1 | 12 | 187 | 15.6 | 33T | 1 |
| Career | | | 25 | 3 | 24 | 410 | 17.1 | 84 | 4 |

=== Postseason ===
| Year | Team | League | Games | | Receiving | | | | |
| Year | Team | League | GP | GS | Rec | Yds | Avg | Lng | TD |
|---|---|---|---|---|---|---|---|---|---|
| 2024 | BHAM | UFL | 2 | 0 | 3 | 76 | 25.3 | 50T | 1 |
| Career | | | 2 | 0 | 3 | 76 | 25.3 | 50 | 1 |
