= Peter Kalambayi =

American football player (born 1995)

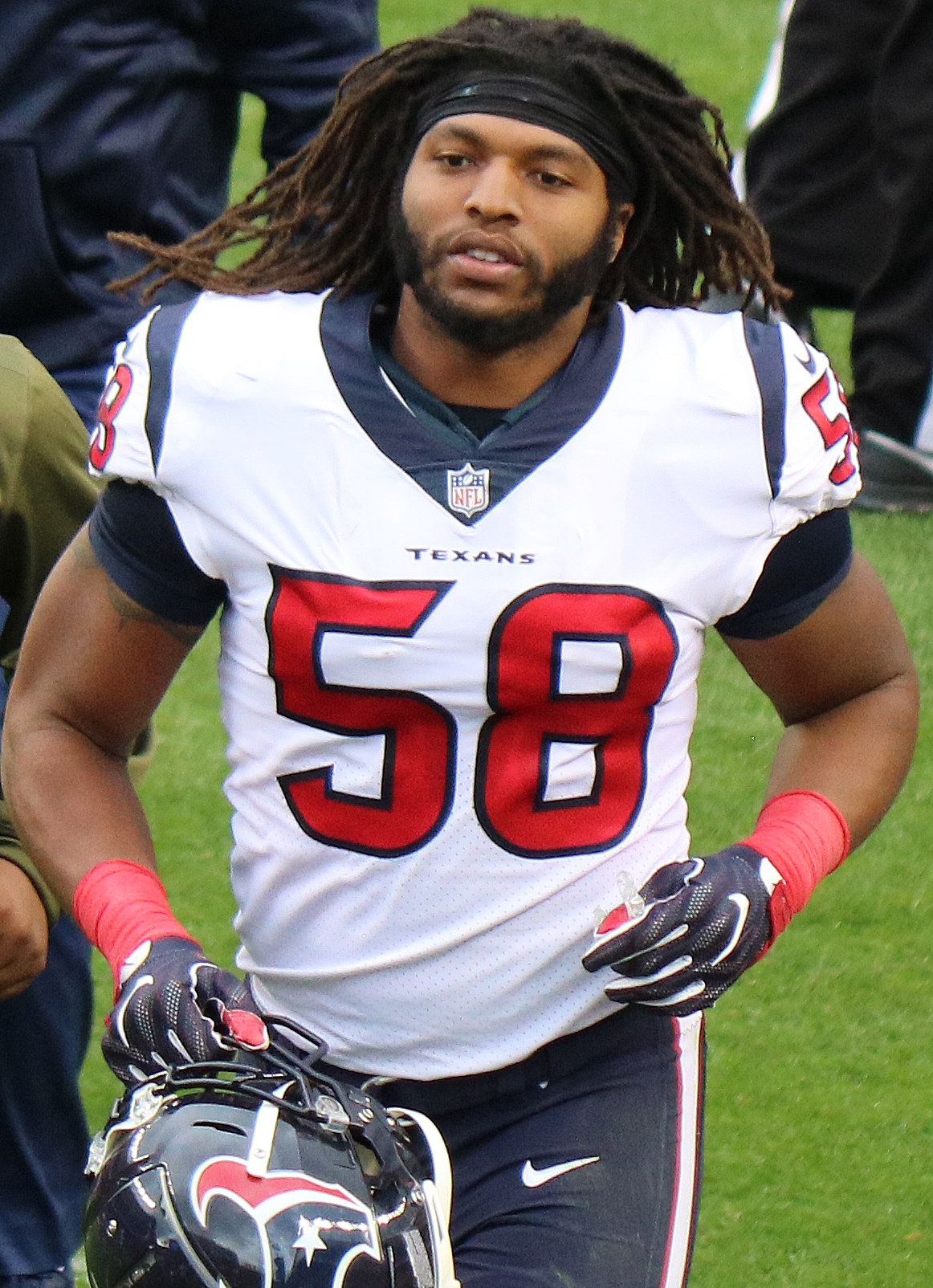
- Kalambayi with the Houston Texans in 2018

No. 58
- Position: Linebacker

Personal information
- Born: June 26, 1995 (age 31); Raleigh, North Carolina, U.S.
- Listed height: 6 ft 3 in (1.91 m)
- Listed weight: 252 lb (114 kg)

Career information
- High school: Matthews (NC) Butler
- College: Stanford (2013–2017)
- NFL draft: 2018: 6th round, 214th overall pick

Career history
- Houston Texans (2018–2020); Denver Broncos (2021)*; Green Bay Packers (2021)*
- * Offseason or practice squad member only

Career NFL statistics
- Total tackles: 33
- Stats at Pro Football Reference

Peter Mukeba Kalambayi (born June 26, 1995) is an American former professional football player who was a linebacker in the National Football League (NFL). He played college football for the Stanford Cardinal.

== High school and college ==
Kalambayi attended David W. Butler High School in Matthews, North Carolina. As a high school football player, he was a member of Butler's 2009, 2010 and 2012 North Carolina 4AA state championship teams. He then played collegiately at Stanford, where he was a two-time team captain.

== Professional career ==
Pre-draft measurables
Height	Weight	Arm length	Hand span	40-yard dash	20-yard shuttle	Three-cone drill	Vertical jump	Broad jump	Bench press
6 ft 2 5/8 in (1.90 m)	252 lb (114 kg)	33 1/2 in (0.85 m)	9 in (0.23 m)	4.57 s	4.36 s	7.13 s	34.0 in (0.86 m)	10 ft 1 in (3.07 m)	19 reps
All values from NFL Combine

=== Houston Texans ===
Kalambayi was selected by the Houston Texans in the sixth round, 214th overall, of the 2018 NFL draft. He logged 33 tackles with the team through the 2020 season. He was waived on February 23, 2021.

=== Denver Broncos ===
On June 7, 2021, Kalambayi signed with the Denver Broncos. He was waived on August 17, 2021.

=== Green Bay Packers ===
On December 20, 2021, Kalambayi was signed to the practice squad of the Green Bay Packers.
