= Vyncint Smith =

American football player (born 1996)

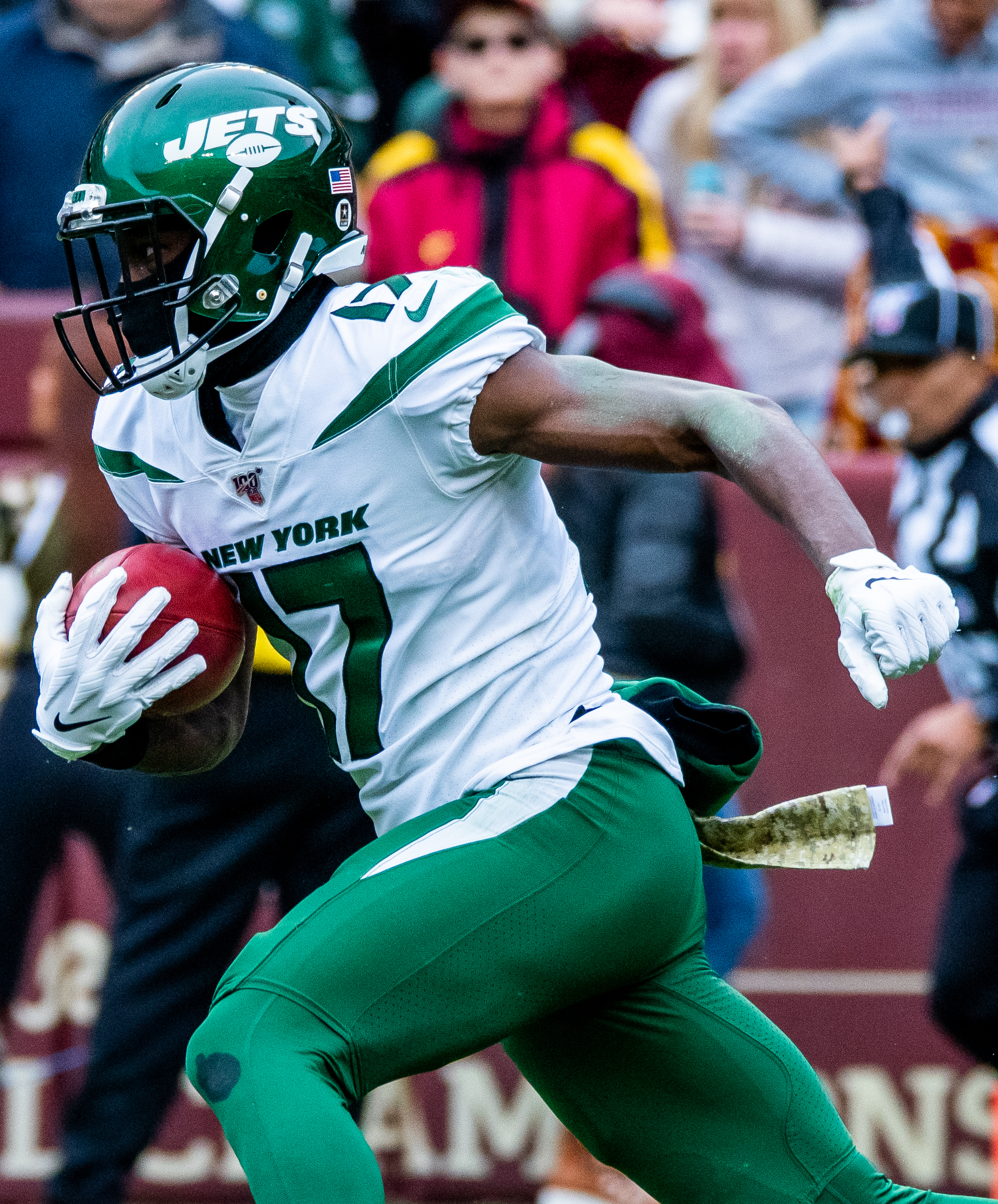
- Smith with the New York Jets in 2019

Profile
- Position: Wide receiver

Personal information
- Born: June 9, 1996 (age 30); Bad Windsheim, Germany
- Listed height: 6 ft 3 in (1.91 m)
- Listed weight: 195 lb (88 kg)

Career information
- High school: Westwood (Columbia, South Carolina, U.S.)
- College: Limestone (2014–2017)
- NFL draft: 2018: undrafted

Career history
- Houston Texans (2018–2019); New York Jets (2019–2021); Tampa Bay Buccaneers (2022)*; Denver Broncos (2022)*; Indianapolis Colts (2022–2023)*; DC Defenders (2024); Toronto Argonauts (2025)*
- * Offseason or practice squad member only

Career NFL statistics
- Receptions: 23
- Receiving yards: 329
- Receiving touchdowns: 1
- Rushing yards: 52
- Rushing touchdowns: 1
- Return yards: 322
- Stats at Pro Football Reference

Vyncint Smith (born June 9, 1996) is an American professional football wide receiver. Smith was born in Germany while his U.S. Army parents were stationed there, but he grew up in South Carolina where he played college football at Limestone University. He signed with the Houston Texans as an undrafted free agent in 2018.

== Professional career ==
Pre-draft measurables
Height	Weight	Arm length	Hand span	40-yard dash	10-yard split	20-yard split	20-yard shuttle	Three-cone drill	Vertical jump	Broad jump
6 ft 2 in (1.88 m)	197 lb (89 kg)	31 1/2 in (0.80 m)	9 1/2 in (0.24 m)	4.38 s	1.52 s	2.57 s	4.27 s	6.89 s	39.5 in (1.00 m)	10 ft 10 in (3.30 m)
All values from Pro Day

=== Houston Texans ===
Smith made his NFL debut in Week 1 against the New England Patriots. The next week, in the 27–22 loss to the New York Giants, he caught his first career pass, a 28-yard reception.

On August 31, 2019, Smith was waived by the Texans and was signed to the practice squad the next day.

=== New York Jets ===
On September 23, 2019, Smith was signed by the New York Jets off the Texans practice squad. In week 5 against the Philadelphia Eagles, Smith rushed 1 time for a 19-yard touchdown in the 31–6 loss. This was Smith's first career rushing touchdown.

On September 7, 2020, Smith was placed on injured reserve. He was activated on October 17.

On March 13, 2021, Smith re-signed with the Jets. He was waived on August 31, 2021 and re-signed to the practice squad the next day.

=== Tampa Bay Buccaneers ===
On January 31, 2022, Smith signed a reserve/future contract with the Tampa Bay Buccaneers. He was released on August 21, 2022.

=== Denver Broncos ===
On September 5, 2022, Smith was signed to the Denver Broncos practice squad. He was released on October 11.

=== Indianapolis Colts ===
On October 17, 2022, Smith was signed to the Indianapolis Colts practice squad. He signed a reserve/future contract on January 9, 2023. He was released on August 29, 2023.

=== DC Defenders ===
On March 5, 2024, Smith signed with the DC Defenders of the United Football League (UFL).

=== Toronto Argonauts ===
On February 3, 2025, it was announced that Smith had signed with the Toronto Argonauts. He was released on May 11.
