= Kendall Lamm =

American football player (born 1992)

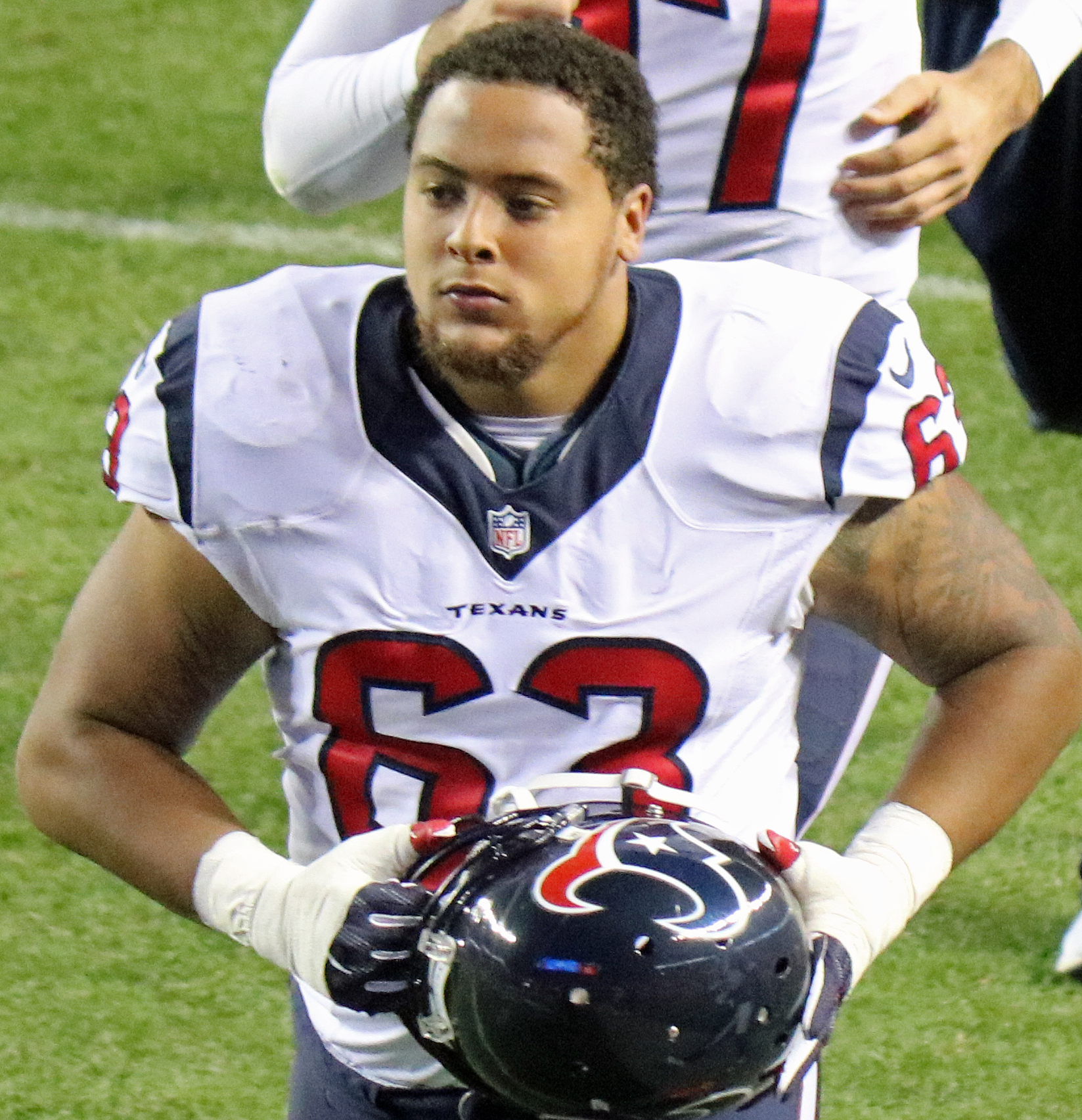
- Lamm with the Houston Texans in 2016

No. 63, 74, 70, 71
- Position: Offensive tackle

Personal information
- Born: June 5, 1992 (age 34); Charlotte, North Carolina, U.S.
- Listed height: 6 ft 5 in (1.96 m)
- Listed weight: 305 lb (138 kg)

Career information
- High school: David W. Butler (Matthews, North Carolina)
- College: Appalachian State (2010–2014)
- NFL draft: 2015: undrafted

Career history
- Houston Texans (2015–2018); Cleveland Browns (2019–2020); Tennessee Titans (2021); Detroit Lions (2022)*; Miami Dolphins (2022–2024); Philadelphia Eagles (2025)*; Miami Dolphins (2025); Baltimore Ravens (2026)*
- * Offseason or practice squad member only

Awards and highlights
- First-team All-Sun Belt (2014)

Career NFL statistics
- Games played: 132
- Games started: 44
- Receptions: 2
- Receiving touchdowns: 1
- Stats at Pro Football Reference

Kendall Allen Lamm (born June 5, 1992) is an American former professional football player who was an offensive tackle in the National Football League (NFL). He played college football for the Appalachian State Mountaineers for four years and was signed by the Houston Texans as an undrafted free agent in 2015.

== Early life ==
Kendall attended David W. Butler High School in Matthews, North Carolina and was an integral part of their 2009 undefeated, 15–0 4AA state championship team. The 2009 Butler team ranked No. 2 nationally by prepnation.com. While at Butler, Kendall was also awarded all-conference honors for his sophomore, junior, and senior seasons, and earned first-team all state honors as a senior. Butler was 49–8 during his prep career under coach Mike Newsome. Kendall committed to play college football at Appalachian State University.

== College career ==
At Appalachian State University, he saw action on the field all four seasons, and he graduated with a bachelor's degree in Communication-Public relations in December 2014. Kendall also became a member of Phi Beta Sigma fraternity, and held a top achievement of being a member of the Appalachian State athletics’ academic honor roll.

His first season with the Mountaineers in 2011 saw him play 8 out of 12 games (Starting 7). The four games that he had missed were due to an injury which caused him to miss 2 games and later on he was suspended for 2 games due to misconduct.

In his second year in 2012, Kendall saw more game time as he started 11-of-12 games at left tackle. The one game he did miss was due to a head injury sustained in training. Within the season, he was number one on the team with the highest season long job grade, 87%, and technique grade, 79%. In his second season, he did not commit a single penalty.

The last 2 seasons of his college career saw Kendall excelling and performing extremely well. He played in all 24 games and was recognized by many coaches as one of the best in the conference. As a right back tackle, he managed to record a total of 46 knockdowns in 2014 alone. The offensive line only allowed 11 sacks all season. That is a record which is tied for 8th among the league. To close the 2014 season, Lamm led his team to a 6-game winning streak in which the offensive line led the attack for the Mountaineers to rush for 1,747 yards (291.2 ypg) and allowed only one sack. He also recorded a game in which he had a performance of the season in which he registered a total of 28 knockdowns and was charged with allowing only one sack all season.

== Professional career ==
Pre-draft measurables
Height	Weight	Arm length	Hand span	Wingspan	40-yard dash	10-yard split	20-yard split	20-yard shuttle	Three-cone drill	Vertical jump	Broad jump	Bench press
6 ft 5 1/4 in (1.96 m)	302 lb (137 kg)	32 5/8 in (0.83 m)	10 1/4 in (0.26 m)	6 ft 7 3/8 in (2.02 m)	5.27 s	1.93 s	3.05 s	4.61 s	7.39 s	26.0 in (0.66 m)	9 ft 1 in (2.77 m)	25 reps
All values from Pro Day

=== Houston Texans ===
On May 8, 2015, Lamm signed with the Houston Texans as an undrafted free agent. After making the Texans' roster as an undrafted rookie, Lamm played in 15 games with four starts in 2015.

In 2016, he played in 15 games with three starts.

On October 28, 2017, Lamm was waived by the Texans and re-signed to the active roster four days later.

In 2018, Lamm started 13 games at right tackle.

=== Cleveland Browns ===
On March 15, 2019, Lamm signed a two-year contract with the Cleveland Browns.

In Week 13 of the 2020 season against the Tennessee Titans, Lamm lined up as an eligible receiver and scored his first career touchdown on a 1-yard pass from Baker Mayfield during the 41–35 win.

=== Tennessee Titans ===
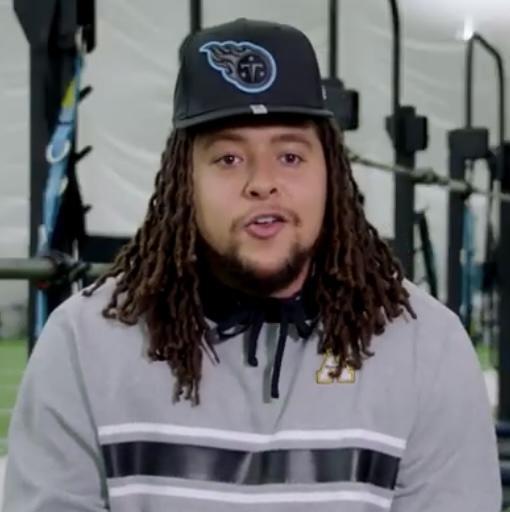
Lamm with the Tennessee Titans in 2021

On March 18, 2021, Lamm signed a two-year contract with the Titans. He was named a backup tackle, starting one game at left tackle.

On March 10, 2022, Lamm was released by the Titans.

=== Detroit Lions ===
On August 8, 2022, Lamm signed with the Detroit Lions. On August 30, he was released by the Lions.

=== Miami Dolphins (first stint) ===
On November 28, 2022, Lamm was signed to the Miami Dolphins' practice squad. He was promoted to the active roster on December 31.

On March 15, 2023, Lamm re-signed with the Dolphins. At the start of the 2023 season, he was named the starting left tackle to fill in for an injured Terron Armstead.

On April 3, 2024, Lamm re-signed with the Dolphins. He made 15 appearances for Miami during the 2024 season, starting 7 games at right tackle in place of an injured Austin Jackson. On January 1, 2025, Lamm was placed on injured reserve with a back injury that required surgery.

=== Philadelphia Eagles ===
On March 25, 2025, Lamm signed a one-year deal with the Philadelphia Eagles. On August 26, he was released as part of final roster cuts.

=== Miami Dolphins (second stint) ===
On August 27, 2025, Lamm signed with the Miami Dolphins.

=== Baltimore Ravens ===
On August 3, 2026, Lamm signed with the Baltimore Ravens. On August 14, he announced his retirement from professional football.

== Personal life ==
Lamm is the son of Candace Lamm. Lamm was raised by his mother, grandmother, and grandfather.
