= Of Good Nature =

American indie rock-reggae band

- Also known as: OGN
- Origin: Charlotte, North Carolina
- Genres: Alternative rock, funk, reggae, fusion, indie rock
- Years active: 10+
- Label: Independent
- Members: Cameron Brown; Brandon Hucks; David Hamilton Jr. Clifton Bundick
- Past members: Joey Vachon; Chris Andrews; Jon Reed
- Website: www.ofgoodnature.com

Of Good Nature (OGN) is an American band based in Charlotte, North Carolina. Their music blends foundations of many different genres including alternative, funk, pop, soul, and reggae.

== History ==
=== Formation (2011) ===
Founding members Cam Brown (guitar, vocals), Joey Vachon (drums, percussion), and Chris Andrews (bass) performed regularly around the Charlotte area and quickly grew a following. Writing and recording original music, the trio released their first full-length album Just Add Water, which won IndieVille TV's Reggae Album of the Year.

=== Band Name and Lineup Changes (2012–2014) ===
In early 2012, Brandon Hucks (trombone) was introduced to the founding members while playing in his own band Queen City Dub. After many shared stages and impromptu sit-ins, Hucks officially joined Of Good Nature, performing first at Shamrock Fest Washington, D.C. In 2014, Jon Reed (bass) joined Of Good Nature as the new bass guitarist.

=== Life Worth Livin’ (2015) ===
The band's second album, Life Worth Livin’, was released in 2015 and debuted at No. 5 on the iTunes Top Reggae Album Chart. Recorded at Ocean Studios in Charleston, South Carolina, this album features songs "Misled", "Tag Line Hook", and the title track, "Life Worth Livin’".

=== 2016–2017 ===
After releasing Life Worth Livin’ the band toured extensively to promote the album. In 2016, current drummer David Hamilton, Jr. joined, and Vachon transitioned to percussion. OGN was invited to play the inaugural Reggae Rise Up Florida as part of their Artist Discovery Series in March 2017. That June the band released their first stand-alone single, "Sit Around", featuring Zach Fowler of Sun-Dried Vibes, produced/mixed by Ted Bowne (Passafire). Also in 2017, OGN was selected via fan voting to join Train's Sail Across the Sun Cruise. This led to invites on the next two cruises, in 2018 and 2020.

=== Timeless (2019) ===
In 2018 OGN spent time at White Star Sound Studios in Charlottesville, VA, recording their third full-length album, Timeless. This led to four singles that year ("Take Me Anywhere", "Feels Right", "Easy Way Out", and "Good Life"), followed by "Listen" in February 2019 two weeks before the album was released. Timeless debuted at No. 1 on the iTunes Top Reggae Album Chart and at No. 3 on the Billboard Top Reggae Album Chart, and was mixed and mastered by Danny Kalb (Beck, Ben Harper).

=== Everything Turns Gold (2020) ===
The band released its fourth studio album, Everything Turns Gold, in May 2020, featuring the singles "You Were Just Here", "Fade", and "New World". The majority of the album was recorded at White Star Sound with producer Danny Kalb. "You Were Just Here" and "It's Our Time" were recorded at Passafarm Studios and produced/mixed by Ted Bowne. Discovery Channel selected to license the entire album for use on all twenty of its networks.

=== Cover EP (2021) ===
Of Good Nature's Cover EP was released in July 2021. It is a compilation of the band's favorite covers, including "Lovely Day", the Bill Withers classic featuring Adrian Crutchfield on saxophone and Elise Testone on backing vocals, "Valerie" (by The Zutons, iconicized by the late Amy Winehouse) and "Aeroplane" (Red Hot Chili Peppers). These were recorded/engineered by Sergio Rios at Killion Sound in North Hollywood, California. Also on the EP, Bob Marley classic "Is This Love" was self-produced and engineered by Of Good Nature in Charlotte, NC. The band released an in-studio music video for "Is This Love" and animated lyric videos for "Lovely Day" and "Valerie". OGN toured heavily in support of the album, performing as direct support for Michael Franti and Spearhead on fifteen dates across both coasts, as well as on his cruise, Soulshine at Sea. In the fall, OGN went on the road for three weeks supporting Passafire, as well as playing numerous dates with Badfish: A Tribute to Sublime.

== Tour history ==
Of Good Nature has also shared the stage with headliners like Slightly Stoopid, Michael Franti and Spearhead, Niko Moon, Dirty Heads, Train, Sublime with Rome, Natasha Beddingfield, Gym Class Heroes, Robert Randolph and the Family Band, Arrested Development, Dropkick Murphys, Matt Nathanson, Keller Williams, Matisyahu, Blues Traveler, Badfish: A Tribute to Sublime, Common Kings, George Porter Jr, Passafire, The Movement, Tribal Seeds, and many others.

=== Festivals ===
- Reggae Rise Up Artist Discovery Series (2017)
- Train's Sail Across the Sun Cruise (2017, 2018, 2020, 2023)
- Dry Diggings (2019)
- Mile of Music (2019)
- One Love Cali Roots (2020)
- Dirty Heads Orlando Vacation (2021)
- Terptown Throwdown (2021)
- Michael Franti's Soulshine at Sea Cruise (2021)

== Other projects ==
- In 2020, OGN was one of eight bands selected by Sierra Nevada for its 'Doing Big Things’ promotion, partnering with local charity RoofAbove and raising donations to help the homeless community in their hometown of Charlotte.
- Virgin Voyages selected OGN to perform as the Guest Band for three of its voyages in Winter 2022.

== Band members ==
=== Current members ===
- Cam Brown – Guitar, Vocals (2011)
- Brandon Hucks – Trombone (2012)
- David Hamilton Jr. – Drums (2016)
- Clifton Bundick IV – Bass (2021)

=== Former members ===
- Joey Vachon IV – Drums / Percussion (2011–2017)
- Chris Andrews – Bass (2011–2014)
- Jon Reed – Bass (2014–2021)

== Discography ==
=== Studio albums ===
Year	Album	Label
2012	Just Add Water	OGN Music Publishing
2015	Life Worth Livin’	OGN Music Publishing
2019	Timeless	Ineffable Records
2020	Everything Turns Gold	OGN Music Publishing

=== EPs ===
Year	Album	Label
2019	Live at SugarShack Sessions	SugarShack Sessions
2021	Cover EP	OGN Music Publishing

=== Singles ===
Title	Release date	Album
"Life Worth Livin’”	September 25, 2015	Life Worth Livin’
"Sit Around”	June 23, 2017	(single)
"Take Me Anywhere”	February 23, 2018	Timeless
"Feels Right”	April 6, 2018	Timeless
"Easy Way Out”	September 14, 2018	Timeless
"Good Life”	November 16, 2018	Timeless
"Listen”	February 8, 2019	Timeless
"Bother Me”	May 17, 2019	Live at SugarShack Sessions
"Feels Right”	December 6, 2019	Live at SugarShack Sessions
"You Were Just Here”	April 3, 2020	Everything Turns Gold
"Fade”	April 17, 2020	Everything Turns Gold
"New World”	May 1, 2020	Everything Turns Gold
"Valerie”	May 7, 2021	Cover EP
"Aeroplane”	June 18, 2021	Cover EP
"Looking for It”	January 7, 2022	(single)
