= 2021 Houston Texans season =

NFL team season

- Owner: Janice and D. Cal McNair
- General manager: Nick Caserio
- Head coach: David Culley
- Offensive coordinator: Tim Kelly
- Defensive coordinator: Lovie Smith
- Home stadium: NRG Stadium

Results
- Record: 4–13
- Division place: 3rd AFC South
- Playoffs: Did not qualify

Uniform
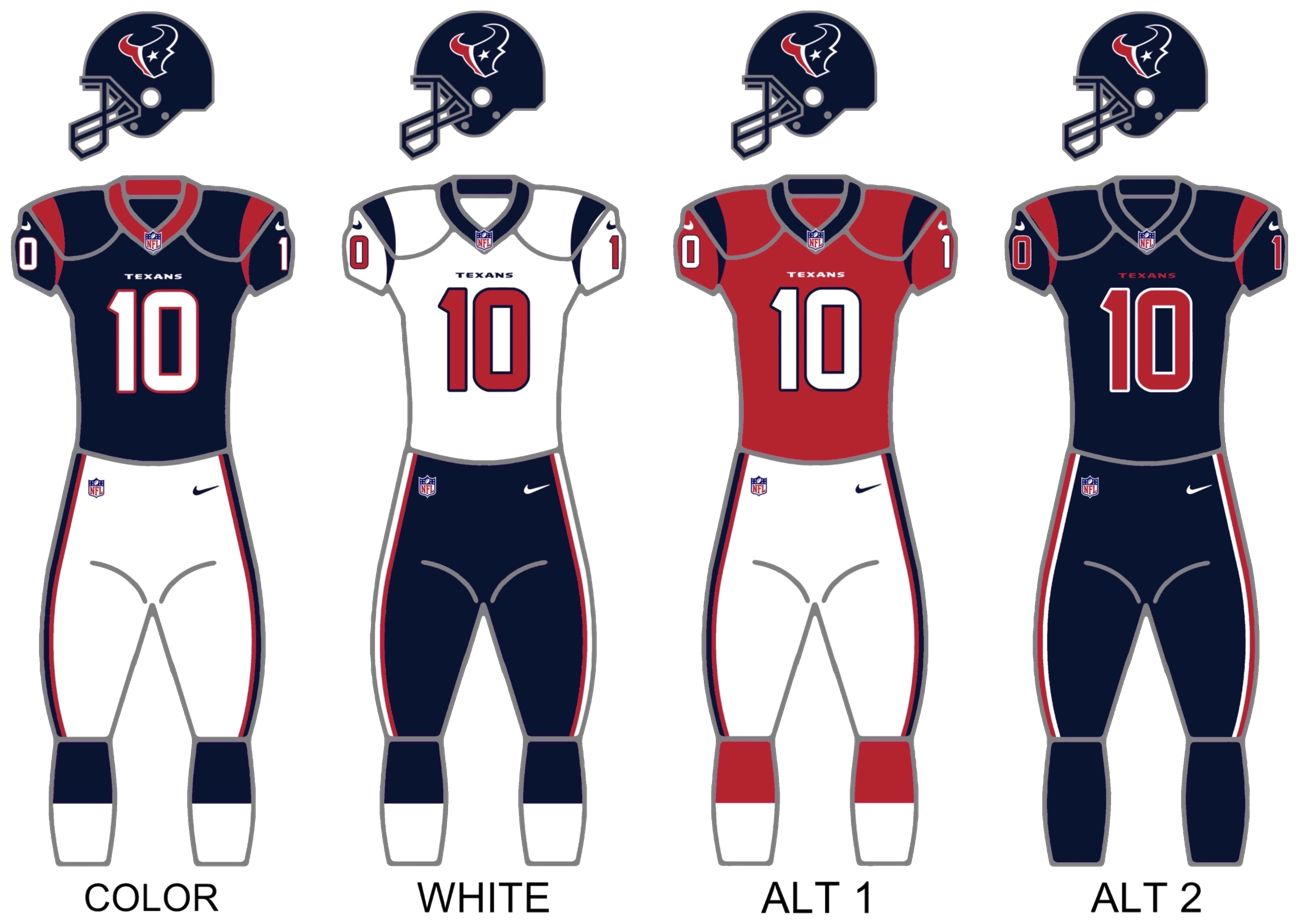

The 2021 season was the Houston Texans' 20th season in the National Football League (NFL), and their only under head coach David Culley. For the first time since 2010, defensive end J. J. Watt was not on the roster, as he had signed with the Arizona Cardinals on March 5, 2021, reuniting him with former Texans teammate DeAndre Hopkins, who was traded to the Cardinals the season prior. It also was the first time since 2014 without former head coach Bill O'Brien, as he was fired just four games into the 2020 season when the Texans began 0–4.

In addition, Deshaun Watson, the starting quarterback since 2017, was inactive the entire season due to several allegations of sexual assault. Though he was never released, suspended, or placed on any reserve list, he was ruled out each week for "non-injury-related" reasons. Veteran free agent signing Tyrod Taylor and rookie Davis Mills split time as the starting quarterback in Watson's stead throughout the season. Due to injury and poor performance by Taylor, Mills would be the starting quarterback for most of the season. Mills would finish the season with 2,664 passing yards, breaking the franchise record for most passing yards in a season by a rookie quarterback. (Note: The record was later broken in 2023 by C. J. Stroud.)

After winning their season opener against the Jacksonville Jaguars, the Texans would go on an eight-game losing streak before winning against the Tennessee Titans in week 11. After a Week 13 loss to the Indianapolis Colts, the Texans became the first team to be eliminated from playoff contention. With a 41–29 upset victory over the Los Angeles Chargers in week 16, the Texans matched their win total from the previous season, at four.

Following the season, head coach David Culley and offensive coordinator Tim Kelly were fired. Watson would also be traded to the Cleveland Browns in the following off-season.

== Offseason ==
On January 7, 2021, the Texans hired Nick Caserio as the team's new General manager. Caserio spend 20 years with the New England Patriots. On January 29, 2021, the Texans hired Ravens assistant head coach, wide receivers coach and passing coordinator David Culley as the team's new head coach.

=== Signings ===
Position	Player	Age	2020 team	Contract
QB	Tyrod Taylor	32	Los Angeles Chargers	1 year, $12.5 million
RB	Phillip Lindsay	27	Denver Broncos	1 year, $3.5 million
RB	Mark Ingram II	31	Baltimore Ravens	1 year, $3 million
RB	Rex Burkhead	30	New England Patriots	1 year, $1.5 million
WR	Andre Roberts	33	Buffalo Bills	2 years, $5.95 million
WR	Chris Moore	28	Baltimore Ravens	1 year, $5.95 million
WR	Alex Erickson	28	Cincinnati Bengals	1 year, no details
WR	Donte Moncrief	28	New England Patriots	1 year, no details
WR	Chris Conley	28	Jacksonville Jaguars	1 year, no details
TE	Paul Quessenberry	29	New England Patriots	1 year, no details
OG	Justin McCray	29	Atlanta Falcons	2 years, $4 million
OG	Lane Taylor	31	Green Bay Packers	1 year, no details
C	Cole Toner	30	Los Angeles Chargers	1 year, no details
C	Justin Britt	30	Did not play	1 year, $5 million
DT	Maliek Collins	26	Las Vegas Raiders	1 year, $6 million
DT	Vincent Taylor	27	Cleveland Browns	1 year, $2 million
LB	Kevin Pierre-Louis	29	Washington Football Team	2 years, $8 million
LB	Jordan Jenkins	27	New York Jets	2 years, $6 million
LB	Christian Kirksey	29	Green Bay Packers	1 year, $4.5 million
LB	Kamu Grugier-Hill	27	Miami Dolphins	1 year, $3.25 million
LB	Joe Thomas	30	Dallas Cowboys	1 year, $2 million
LB	Derek Rivers	27	Los Angeles Rams	1 year, $1.3 million
LB	Tae Davis	25	Cleveland Browns	1 year, no details
LB	Hardy Nickerson Jr.	27	Minnesota Vikings	1 year, no details
CB	Terrance Mitchell	29	Cleveland Browns	2 years, $7.5 million
CB	Tavierre Thomas	25	Cleveland Browns	2 years, no details
CB	Desmond King	26	Tennessee Titans	1 year, $3.5 million
CB	Tremon Smith	25	Indianapolis Colts	1 year, $1.13 million
S	Terrence Brooks	29	New England Patriots	1 year, $2 million
P	Cameron Johnston	29	Philadelphia Eagles	3 years, $8 million

=== Re-signings ===
Position	Player	Age	Contract
RB	Dontrell Hilliard	26	1 year, $1.25 million
RB	Buddy Howell	24	1 year, no details
TE	Pharaoh Brown	27	1 year, $2.2 million
CB	Vernon Hargreaves	26	1 year, no details
CB	Cornell Armstrong	26	1 year, no details
LS	Jon Weeks	35	1 year, 1.075 million

=== Departures ===
Position	Player	Age	2021 team
QB	Ryan Finley	26	TBD
RB	Duke Johnson	27	Jacksonville Jaguars
FB	Cullen Gillaspia	26	New York Giants
WR	Chad Hansen	26	Detroit Lions
WR	Steven Mitchell	26	TBD
TE	Darren Fells	34	Detroit Lions
OG	Senio Kelemete	31	San Francisco 49ers
OG	Zach Fulton	29	New York Giants
OG	Beau Benzschawel	25	Washington Football Team
C	Nick Martin	28	Las Vegas Raiders
DE	J. J. Watt	31	Arizona Cardinals
DT	Carlos Watkins	28	Dallas Cowboys
CB	Mark Fields	24	San Francisco 49ers
CB	Brandon Williams	28	TBD
P	Bryan Anger	32	Dallas Cowboys
LS	Anthony Kukwa	28	TBD

=== Trades ===
March 17	To Houston Texans: Shaq Lawson; WAS's 2021 sixth round pick	To Miami Dolphins: Benardrick McKinney; 2021 7th round pick
March 17	To Houston Texans: Marcus Cannon; 2021 fifth round pick; DAL's 2021 sixth round pick	To New England Patriots: ARI's 2021 fourth round pick; 2021 sixth round pick
March 18	To Houston Texans: Ryan Izzo	To New England Patriots: 2022 seventh round pick
March 19	To Houston Texans: Ryan Finley; 2021 seventh round pick	To Cincinnati Bengals: MIA's 2021 sixth round pick

== Draft ==
2021 Houston Texans draft
Round	Pick	Player	Position	College	Notes
3	67	Davis Mills	QB	Stanford	
3	89	Nico Collins *	WR	Michigan	from Cleveland via Carolina
5	147	Brevin Jordan	TE	Miami (FL)	
5	170	Garret Wallow	LB	TCU	from Cleveland via Jacksonville and L.A. Rams
6	195	Roy Lopez	DT	Arizona	from Dallas via New England
Made roster * Made at least one Pro Bowl during career

== NFL Top 100 ==
NFL Network began announcing its annual top 100 list on August 15, 2021. Two players were named to the list.

Rank	Player	Position	Change
18	Deshaun Watson	Quarterback	▲2
75	Laremy Tunsil	Offensive tackle	▼9

== Staff ==
2021 Houston Texans staff
Front office: Owner – Janice McNair; CEO – Cal McNair; President – Greg Grissom; General manager – Nick Caserio; Executive vice president of football operations – Jack Easterby; Executive vice president/general counsel – Greg Kondritz; Director of football operations – Clay Hampton; Assistant director of player personnel – Matt Bazirgan; Assistant director of player personnel – James Liipfert; Senior advisor for football performance – Romeo Crennel; Director of team development – Dylan Thompson; Head coaches: Head coach – David Culley; Associate head coach/defensive coordinator – Lovie Smith; Offensive coaches: Offensive coordinator – Tim Kelly; Passing game coordinator/quarterbacks – Pep Hamilton; Running backs – Danny Barrett; Wide receivers – Robert Prince; Assistant wide receivers/offensive assistant – Ben McDaniels; Tight ends – Andy Bischoff; Offensive line – James Campen; Assistant offensive line/offensive assistant – Robert Kugler; Offensive assistant – DeNarius McGhee	Defensive coaches: Defensive line – Bobby King; Assistant defensive line/defensive assistant – Allen Smith; Linebackers – Miles Smith; Cornerbacks – Dino Vasso; Safeties – Greg Jackson; Defensive assistant – Ilir Emini; Defensive assistant – Ben Bolling; Special teams coaches: Special teams coordinator – Frank Ross; Assistant special teams – Sean Baker; Strength and conditioning: Head strength and conditioning – Mike Eubanks; Assistant strength and conditioning coach – James Hardy; Assistant strength and conditioning coach – Joe Distor; Assistant strength and conditioning coach – Pat Moorer

== Final roster ==
2021 Houston Texans roster
Quarterbacks (QB): 10 Davis Mills; 5 Tyrod Taylor; 4 Deshaun Watson; Running backs (RB): 28 Rex Burkhead; 26 Royce Freeman; 31 David Johnson; Wide receivers (WR): 89 Danny Amendola; 12 Nico Collins; 18 Chris Conley; 13 Brandin Cooks; 15 Chris Moore; Tight ends (TE): 88 Jordan Akins; 83 Antony Auclair; 85 Pharaoh Brown; 9 Brevin Jordan	Offensive linemen (OL): 68 Justin Britt C; 72 Geron Christian T; 67 Charlie Heck T; 71 Tytus Howard G/T; 64 Justin McCray G/C; 79 Jimmy Morrissey C; 74 Max Scharping G; 65 Lane Taylor G; Defensive linemen (DL): 90 Ross Blacklock DT; 75 Ron'Dell Carter DE; 97 Maliek Collins DT; 52 Jonathan Greenard DE; 50 Jordan Jenkins DE; 93 Jaleel Johnson DT; 91 Roy Lopez DT; 54 Jacob Martin DE; 95 Derek Rivers DE; 92 Chris Smith DE; 55 DeMarcus Walker DE	Linebackers (LB): 51 Kamu Grugier-Hill OLB; 43 Neville Hewitt OLB/MLB; 58 Christian Kirksey MLB; 57 Kevin Pierre-Louis OLB; 32 Garret Wallow OLB; 59 Eric Wilson MLB; Defensive backs (DB): 29 Terrence Brooks FS/SS; 1 Lonnie Johnson Jr. SS/FS/CB; 25 Desmond King CB; 39 Terrance Mitchell CB; 33 A. J. Moore SS; 22 Jimmy Moreland CB; 23 Eric Murray SS; 24 Tremon Smith CB; 37 Tavierre Thomas CB; Special teams (ST): 7 Kaʻimi Fairbairn K; 11 Cameron Johnston P; 46 Jon Weeks LS	Practice squad: 30 Darius Anderson RB; 17 Jalen Camp WR; 63 Sam Cooper G; 98 Michael Dwumfour DT; 60 Jake Eldrenkamp G; 62 Carson Green T; 14 T. J. Green FS; 94 Demone Harris DE; 86 Damon Hazelton WR; 21 Cre'Von LeBlanc CB; 45 Paul Quessenberry TE; 38 Jaylen Samuels RB; 70 Jordan Steckler T; 53 Connor Strachan OLB; 84 Jordan Veasy WR; 43 Josh Watson MLB; Reserve: 35 Grayland Arnold CB (IR); 61 Marcus Cannon T (IR); 81 Davion Davis WR (IR); -- Tae Davis OLB (IR); 2 Phillip Dorsett WR (IR); 6 Jeff Driskel TE (IR); 56 Hardy Nickerson Jr. MLB (IR); 36 Jonathan Owens (IR) FS/SS; 27 Scottie Phillips RB (IR); 20 Justin Reid FS (COVID-19); 96 Vincent Taylor DT (IR); 66 Cole Toner G (IR); 78 Laremy Tunsil T (IR); Rookies in italics 52 active, 13 reserve, 16 practice squad

== Preseason ==
=== Schedule ===
Week	Date	Opponent	Result	Record	Venue	Recap
1	August 14	at Green Bay Packers	W 26–7	1–0	Lambeau Field	Recap
2	August 21	at Dallas Cowboys	W 20–14	2–0	AT&T Stadium	Recap
3	August 28	Tampa Bay Buccaneers	L 16–23	2–1	NRG Stadium	Recap

=== Game summaries ===
==== Week 1: at Green Bay Packers ====
Week One: Houston Texans at Green Bay Packers – Game summary

Quarter	1	2	3	4	Total
Texans	3	10	3	10	26
Packers	0	7	0	0	7

at Lambeau Field, Green Bay, Wisconsin

- Date: August 14
- Game time: 7:00 p.m. CDT
- Game attendance: 72,348
- TV: KTRK
- Recap

Game information

First quarter

- HOU – Kaʻimi Fairbairn 37-yard field goal, 7:48. Texans 3–0. Drive: 11 plays, 53 yards, 5:33.

Second quarter

- GB – Kylin Hill 22-yard pass from Jordan Love (J. J. Molson kick), 14:15. Packers 7–3. Drive: 9 plays, 88 yards, 5:13.
- HOU – Scottie Phillips 5-yard run (Kaʻimi Fairbairn kick), 9:08. Texans 10–7. Drive: 6 plays, 42 yards, 2:03.
- HOU – Kaʻimi Fairbarin 25-yard field goal, 0:56. Texans 13–7. Drive: 17 plays, 71 yards, 6:01.

Third quarter

- HOU – Kaʻimi Fairbairn 41-yard field goal, 6:11. Texans 16–7. Drive: 9 plays, 34 yards, 3:57.

Fourth quarter

- HOU – Kaʻimi Fairbairn 42-yard field goal, 13:01. Texans 19–7. Drive: 7 plays, 36 yards, 3:28.
- HOU – Darius Jackson 25-yard run (Kaʻimi Fairbairn kick), 6:06. Texans 26–7. Drive: 3 plays, 34 yards, 1:39.

Top passers

- HOU – Davis Mills – 11/21, 112 yards, INT
- GB – Jordan Love – 12/17, 122 yards, TD

Top rushers

- HOU – Scottie Phillips – 13 rushes, 66 yards, TD
- GB – Dexter Williams – 4 rushes, 32 yards

Top receivers

- HOU – Chris Conley – 4 receptions, 51 yards
- GB – Devin Funchess – 6 receptions, 70 yards

Tyrod Taylor started at quarterback for the Texans, leading the team 57 yards downfield on his first drive, before the drive stalled at Green Bay's 19-yard line; the Texans would settle for a 37-yard field goal from Kaʻimi Fairbairn to take a 3–0 lead. This was the only drive Taylor would play, going 4-of-4 for 40 yards. Rookie quarterback Davis Mills entered the game on Houston's next drive, being sacked once and throwing an incomplete pass as the Texans went three-and-out. After the rough start, Mills would settle in and lead the Texans on two scoring drives, resulting in ten points. Late in the 2nd quarter, Green Bay quarterback Jordan Love was sacked and fumbled the ball, with Jaleel Johnson recovering for Houston at the Green Bay 17-yard line; however, Mills would throw an interception on the very next play. Mills would briefly appear in the 2nd half before Jeff Driskel took over midway in the 3rd quarter. Driskel would remain the Texans' quarterback for the rest of the game; Driskel would only complete one pass out of six attempts for 2 yards. Late in the 4th quarter, Houston cornerback Tremon Smith intercepted a Kurt Benkert pass.

The three Texans' quarterbacks finished with a combined 16/32 for 149 yards, no touchdowns, and one interception.

==== Week 2: at Dallas Cowboys ====
Week Two: Houston Texans at Dallas Cowboys – Game summary

Quarter	1	2	3	4	Total
Texans	7	0	7	6	20
Cowboys	7	7	0	0	14

at AT&T Stadium, Arlington, Texas

- Date: August 21
- Game time: 7:00 p.m. CDT
- Game weather: None (retractable roof closed)
- Referee: Brad Rogers
- TV: KTRK
- Recap

Game information

First quarter

- HOU – Mark Ingram II 2-yard run (Kaʻimi Fairbairn kick), 11:06. Texans 7–0. Drive: 7 plays, 23 yards, 3:04.
- DAL – Tony Pollard 8-yard pass from Cooper Rush (Lirim Hajrullahu kick), 3:36. Tied 7–7. Drive: 5 plays, 75 yards, 2:15.

Second quarter

- DAL – Cedrick Wilson Jr. 9-yard pass from Cooper Rush (Lirim Hajrullahu kick), 1:48. Cowboys 14–7. Drive: 13 plays, 85 yards, 6:11.

Third quarter

- HOU – Lonnie Johnson Jr. 53-yard interception return (Kaʻimi Fairbairn kick), 6:52. Tied 14–14.

Fourth quarter

- HOU – Kaʻimi Fairbairn 38-yard field goal, 11:35. Texans 17–14. Drive: 8 plays, 70 yards, 4:15.
- HOU – Kaʻimi Fairbairn 24-yard field goal, 2:13. Texans 20–14. Drive: 9 plays, 45 yards, 2:53.

Top passers

- HOU – Davis Mills – 10/16, 115 yards
- DAL – Ben DiNucci – 14/19, 120 yards, 3 INT

Top rushers

- HOU – Mark Ingram II – 7 rushes, 24 yards, TD
- DAL – Rico Dowdle – 6 rushes, 31 yards

Top receivers

- HOU – Jordan Veasy – 2 receptions, 30 yards
- DAL – Noah Brown – 3 receptions, 35 yards

The Cowboys received the opening kickoff, with Houston defensive end Jacob Martin causing a fumble on the third play of the game, with Charles Omenihu recovering it for the Texans. Tyrod Taylor started at quarterback for Houston, leading the offense on a short drive that ended with a 2-yard touchdown run from Mark Ingram II Taylor would play for most of the 1st quarter before Davis Mills came in with 0:22 left; Taylor finished 2-of-5 for 10 yards. In the third quarter, cornerback Lonnie Johnson Jr. intercepted a Ben DiNucci pass and returned it 53 yards for a pick six touchdown. Shyheim Carter picked off a DiNucci pass in the 4th quarter, returning it 5 yards to the 50-yard line. Jeff Driskel took over at quarterback on the next drive, leading the team down to the red zone before the drive stalled, settling for a 24-yard field goal from Kaʻimi Fairbairn to give the Texans a 20–14 lead. Late in the 4th quarter, with the Cowboys trying to win the game, strong safety Terrence Brooks intercepted DiNucci, sealing the victory for the Texans.

The Texans only had 220 yards of offense versus the Cowboys' 308, but committed no turnovers while Dallas turned the ball over four times. The three Houston quarterbacks finished for a combined 13-of-23 for 131 yards.

==== Week 3: vs. Tampa Bay Buccaneers ====
Week Three: Tampa Bay Buccaneers at Houston Texans – Game summary

Quarter	1	2	3	4	Total
Buccaneers	6	10	7	0	23
Texans	0	2	8	6	16

at NRG Stadium, Houston, Texas

- Date: August 28
- Game time: 7:00 p.m. CDT
- Game weather: None (retractable roof closed)
- TV: KTRK
- Recap

Game information

First quarter

- TB – Chris Goodwin 24-yard pass from Tom Brady (kick blocked), 10:12. Buccaneers 6–0. Drive: 7 plays, 91 yards, 2:26.

Second quarter

- TB – Ronald Jones II 13-yard run (José Borregales kick), 11:43. Buccaneers 13–0. Drive: 8 plays, 93 yards, 3:34.
- HOU – Blaine Gabbert sacked in end zone, 11:43. Buccaneers 13–2.
- TB – José Borregales 36-yard field goal, 0:00. Buccaneers 16–2. Drive: 6 plays, 24 yards, 0:53.

Third quarter

- HOU – Nico Collins 11-yard pass from Davis Mills (Davis Mills pass to Keke Coutee), 8:44. Buccaneers 16–10. Drive: 1 play, 11 yards, 0:04.
- TB – Codey McElroy 20-yard pass from Kyle Trask (José Borregales kick), 5:13. Buccaneers 23–10. Drive: 6 plays, 78 yards, 3:31.

Fourth quarter

- HOU – Jordan Veasy 9-yard pass from Davis Mills (pass failed), 12:33. Buccaneers 23–16. Drive: 5 plays, 39 yards, 1:40.

Top passers

- TB – Tom Brady – 11/14, 154 yards, TD
- HOU – Davis Mills – 10/27, 106 yards, 2 TD, 3 INT

Top rushers

- TB – Ke'Shawn Vaughn – 15 rushes, 29 yards
- HOU – Scottie Phillips – 8 rushes, 73 yards

Top receivers

- TB – Chris Goodwin – 3 receptions, 84 yards, TD
- HOU – Chris Moore – 2 receptions, 40 yards

Kicker Kaʻimi Fairbairn suffered an injury during pregame warmups, with safety Justin Reid handling the kickoffs for the Texans; Reid would not attempt any field goals or extra points, with the team opting to go for it on 4th down and attempt a two-point conversion after touchdowns. Tyrod Taylor started at quarterback and played until midway of the 2nd quarter. Taylor left the game after losing a fumble on a sack, finishing 6-of-9 for 31 yards. Davis Mills would play for the rest of the game, going 10-of-27 for 106 yards with two touchdowns, but also threw three interceptions and lost a fumble. Taylor and Mills finished for a combined 16-of-36 for 115 yards, two touchdowns, and three interceptions.

== Regular season ==
=== Schedule ===
The Texans' 2021 schedule was announced on May 12.

Week	Date	Opponent	Result	Record	Venue	Recap
1	September 12	**Jacksonville Jaguars**	**W** 37–21	1–0	NRG Stadium	Recap
2	September 19	at Cleveland Browns	**L** 21–31	1–1	FirstEnergy Stadium	Recap
3	September 23	Carolina Panthers	**L** 9–24	1–2	NRG Stadium	Recap
4	October 3	at Buffalo Bills	**L** 0–40	1–3	Highmark Stadium	Recap
5	October 10	New England Patriots	**L** 22–25	1–4	NRG Stadium	Recap
6	October 17	at **Indianapolis Colts**	**L** 3–31	1–5	Lucas Oil Stadium	Recap
7	October 24	at Arizona Cardinals	**L** 5–31	1–6	State Farm Stadium	Recap
8	October 31	Los Angeles Rams	**L** 22–38	1–7	NRG Stadium	Recap
9	November 7	at Miami Dolphins	**L** 9–17	1–8	Hard Rock Stadium	Recap
10	Bye					
11	November 21	at **Tennessee Titans**	**W** 22–13	2–8	Nissan Stadium	Recap
12	November 28	New York Jets	**L** 14–21	2–9	NRG Stadium	Recap
13	December 5	**Indianapolis Colts**	**L** 0–31	2–10	NRG Stadium	Recap
14	December 12	Seattle Seahawks	**L** 13–33	2–11	NRG Stadium	Recap
15	December 19	at **Jacksonville Jaguars**	**W** 30–16	3–11	TIAA Bank Field	Recap
16	December 26	Los Angeles Chargers	**W** 41–29	4–11	NRG Stadium	Recap
17	January 2	at San Francisco 49ers	**L** 7–23	4–12	Levi's Stadium	Recap
18	January 9	**Tennessee Titans**	**L** 25–28	4–13	NRG Stadium	Recap

Note: Intra-division opponents are in bold text.

=== Game summaries ===
==== Week 1: vs. Jacksonville Jaguars ====
Week 1: Jacksonville Jaguars at Houston Texans – Game summary

Quarter	1	2	3	4	Total
Jaguars	0	7	7	7	**21**
**Texans**	14	13	7	3	**37**

at NRG Stadium, Houston, Texas

- Date: September 12
- Game time: 12:00 p.m. CDT
- Game weather: None (retractable roof closed)
- Game attendance: 68,105
- Referee: Land Clark
- TV announcers (CBS): Greg Gumbel, Adam Archuleta and AJ Ross
- Recap, Game Book

Game information

**First quarter**

- HOU – Mark Ingram II 1-yard run (Joey Slye kick), 6:42. Texans 7–0. **Drive: 14 plays, 84 yards, 7:02.**
- HOU – David Johnson 7-yard pass from Tyrod Taylor (Joey Slye kick), 2:25. Texans 14–0. **Drive: 5 plays, 55 yards, 2:14.**

**Second quarter**

- JAX – Chris Manhertz 22-yard pass from Trevor Lawrence (Josh Lambo kick), 12:25. Texans 14–7. **Drive: 11 plays, 75 yards, 5:05.**
- HOU – Joey Slye 40-yard field goal, 8:11. Texans 17–7. **Drive: 9 plays, 54 yards, 4:13.**
- HOU – Joey Slye 26-yard field goal, 1:02. Texans 20–7. **Drive: 5 plays, 0 yards, 1:18.**
- HOU – Danny Amendola 8-yard pass from Tyrod Taylor (Joey Slye kick), 0:08. Texans 27–7. **Drive: 4 plays, 69 yards, 0:29.**

**Third quarter**

- HOU – Phillip Lindsay 5-yard run (Joey Slye kick), 3:24. Texans 34–7. **Drive: 9 plays, 68 yards, 4:44.**
- JAX – D. J. Chark 41-yard pass from Trevor Lawrence (Josh Lambo kick), 1:48. Texans 34–14. **Drive: 4 plays, 75 yards, 1:36.**

**Fourth quarter**

- HOU – Joey Slye 25-yard field goal, 11:59. Texans 37–14. **Drive: 7 plays, 62 yards, 2:53.**
- JAX – Marvin Jones 4-yard pass from Trevor Lawrence (Josh Lambo kick), 0:05. Texans 37–21. **Drive: 12 plays, 85 yards, 2:45.**

**Top passers**

- JAX – Trevor Lawrence – 28/51, 332 yards, 3 TD, 3 INT
- HOU – Tyrod Taylor – 21/33, 291 yards, 2 TD

**Top rushers**

- JAX – Carlos Hyde – 9 rushes, 44 yards
- HOU – Mark Ingram II – 26 rushes, 85 yards, TD

**Top receivers**

- JAX – D. J. Chark – 3 receptions, 86 yards, TD
- HOU – Brandin Cooks – 5 receptions, 132 yards

The Texans kicked off the 2021 season and the David Culley era at home against AFC South rival the Jacksonville Jaguars and Trevor Lawrence, the first overall pick in the 2021 NFL draft. The Texans' defense picked off Lawrence three times while the offense committed no turnovers. With the win, the Texans started 1–0 for the first time since 2016; additionally, the Texans were the only AFC South team to win during week 1.

==== Week 2: at Cleveland Browns ====
Week 2: Houston Texans at Cleveland Browns – Game summary

Quarter	1	2	3	4	Total
Texans	7	7	0	7	**21**
**Browns**	7	7	10	7	**31**

at FirstEnergy Stadium, Cleveland, Ohio

- Date: September 19
- Game time: 1:00 p.m. EDT/12:00 p.m. CDT
- Game weather: Sunny, 75 °F (24 °C)
- Game attendance: 67,431
- Referee: Brad Rogers
- TV announcers (CBS): Greg Gumbel, Adam Archuleta and AJ Ross
- Recap, Game Book

Game information

**First quarter**

- CLE – Andy Janovich 1-yard run (Chase McLaughlin kick), 9:56. Browns 7–0. **Drive: 4 plays, 35 yards, 2:02.**
- HOU – Phillip Lindsay 20-yard pass from Tyrod Taylor (Joey Slye kick), 5:18. Tied 7–7. **Drive: 8 plays, 84 yards, 4:38.**

**Second quarter**

- HOU – Tyrod Taylor 15-yard run (Joey Slye kick), 7:06. Texans 14–7. **Drive: 6 plays, 47 yards, 2:38.**
- CLE – Baker Mayfield 5-yard run (Chase McLaughlin kick), 1:14. Tied 14–14. **Drive: 10 plays, 75 yards, 5:52.**

**Third quarter**

- CLE – Demetric Felton 33-yard pass from Baker Mayfield (Chase McLaughlin kick), 7:50. Browns 21–14. **Drive: 7 plays, 72 yards, 5:52.**
- CLE – Chase McLaughlin 30-yard field goal, 4:40. Browns 24–14. **Drive: 4 plays, 6 yards, 1:37.**

**Fourth quarter**

- HOU – Brandin Cooks 2-yard pass from Davis Mills (Joey Slye kick), 11:32. Browns 24–21. **Drive: 16 plays, 75 yards, 8:08.**
- CLE – Nick Chubb 26-yard run (Chase McLaughlin kick), 5:52. Browns 31–21. **Drive: 9 plays, 82 yards, 5:40.**

**Top passers**

- HOU – Tyrod Taylor – 10/11, 126 yards, TD
- CLE – Baker Mayfield – 19/21, 213 yards, TD, INT

**Top rushers**

- HOU – Mark Ingram II – 14 rushes, 41 yards
- CLE – Nick Chubb – 11 rushes, 95 yards, TD

**Top receivers**

- HOU – Brandin Cooks – 9 receptions, 78 yards, TD
- CLE – Demetric Felton – 2 receptions, 51 yards, TD

Starting quarterback Tyrod Taylor suffered a hamstring injury during the first half, with rookie Davis Mills replacing him for the second half.

==== Week 3: vs. Carolina Panthers ====
Week 3: Carolina Panthers at Houston Texans – Game summary

Quarter	1	2	3	4	Total
**Panthers**	7	0	7	10	**24**
Texans	0	6	0	3	**9**

at NRG Stadium, Houston, Texas

- Date: September 23
- Game time: 7:20 p.m. CDT
- Game weather: None (retractable roof closed)
- Game attendance: 68,320
- Referee: Alex Kemp
- TV announcers (NFLN): Joe Buck, Troy Aikman, Erin Andrews and Kristina Pink
- Recap, Game Book

Game information

**First quarter**

- CAR – Sam Darnold 5-yard run (Zane Gonzalez kick), 6:36. Panthers 7–0. **Drive: 10 plays, 88 yards, 6:00.**

**Second quarter**

- HOU – Anthony Miller 1-yard pass from Davis Mills (kick failed), 0:25. Panthers 7–6. **Drive: 7 plays, 64 yards, 1:12.**

**Third quarter**

- CAR – Tommy Tremble 7-yard run (Zane Gonzalez kick), 6:20. Panthers 14–6. **Drive: 9 plays, 91 yards, 4:17.**

**Fourth quarter**

- CAR – Zane Gonzalez 21-yard field goal, 12:44. Panthers 17–6. **Drive: 10 plays, 56 yards, 6:31.**
- HOU – Joey Slye 53-yard field goal, 9:09. Panthers 17–9. **Drive: 8 plays, 40 yards, 3:35.**
- CAR – Sam Darnold 1-yard run (Zane Gonzalez kick), 4:07. Panthers 24–9. **Drive: 12 plays, 75 yards, 5:02.**

**Top passers**

- CAR – Sam Darnold – 23/34, 304 yards
- HOU – Davis Mills – 19/28, 168 yards, TD

**Top rushers**

- CAR – Chuba Hubbard – 11 rushes, 52 yards
- HOU – Mark Ingram II – 6 rushes, 21 yards

**Top receivers**

- CAR – D. J. Moore – 8 receptions, 126 yards
- HOU – Brandin Cooks – 9 receptions, 112 yards

Rookie quarterback Davis Mills started his first NFL game as Tyrod Taylor was still recovering from a hamstring injury. After a slow start, Mills would lead the offense on a quick scoring drive to end the half with a 1-yard pass to Anthony Miller, but kicker Joey Slye missed the extra point. The offense would continue to be inconsistent throughout the 2nd half, with Mills constantly being pressured by Carolina's defense.

==== Week 4: at Buffalo Bills ====
Week 4: Houston Texans at Buffalo Bills – Game summary

Quarter	1	2	3	4	Total
Texans	0	0	0	0	**0**
**Bills**	7	9	3	21	**40**

at Highmark Stadium, Orchard Park, New York

- Date: October 3
- Game time: 1:00 p.m. EDT/12:00 p.m. CDT
- Game weather: Light rain, fog and mist, 67 °F (19 °C)
- Game attendance: 68,087
- Referee: Ronald Torbert
- TV announcers (CBS): Beth Mowins and Tiki Barber
- Recap, Game Book

Game information

**First quarter**

- BUF – Dawson Knox 25-yard pass from Josh Allen (Tyler Bass kick), 1:59. Bills 7–0. **Drive: 9 plays, 69 yards, 5:02.**

**Second quarter**

- BUF – Tyler Bass 33-yard field goal, 13:05. Bills 10–0. **Drive: 5 plays, 35 yards, 1:55.**
- BUF – Tyler Bass 26-yard field goal, 7:12. Bills 13–0. **Drive: 7 plays, 41 yards, 3:31.**
- BUF – Tyler Bass 21-yard field goal, 0:23. Bills 16–0. **Drive: 8 plays, 41 yards, 1:17.**

**Third quarter**

- BUF – Tyler Bass 28-yard field goal, 8:45. Bills 19–0. **Drive: 11 plays, 65 yards, 6:15.**

**Fourth quarter**

- BUF – Dawson Knox 1-yard pass from Josh Allen (Tyler Bass kick), 13:29. Bills 26–0. **Drive: 11 plays, 84 yards, 6:49.**
- BUF – Zack Moss 4-yard run (Tyler Bass kick), 10:44. Bills 33–0. **Drive: 4 plays, 27 yards, 2:15.**
- BUF – Mitchell Trubisky 4-yard run (Tyler Bass kick), 3:36. Bills 40–0. **Drive: 7 plays, 53 yards, 4:27.**

**Top passers**

- HOU – Davis Mills – 11/21, 87 yards, 4 INT
- BUF – Josh Allen – 20/29, 248 yards, 2 TD, INT

**Top rushers**

- HOU – Mark Ingram II – 6 rushes, 24 yards
- BUF – Devin Singletary – 14 rushes, 79 yards

**Top receivers**

- HOU – Brandin Cooks – 5 receptions, 47 yards
- BUF – Stefon Diggs – 7 receptions, 114 yards

The Texans committed five turnovers, with quarterback Davis Mills throwing four interceptions and tight end Jordan Akins losing a fumble and only had 109 yards of total offense. The Texans were shutout for the first time since 2016. The 40 point loss is also the largest in franchise history.

==== Week 5: vs. New England Patriots ====
Week 5: New England Patriots at Houston Texans – Game summary

Quarter	1	2	3	4	Total
**Patriots**	0	9	6	10	**25**
Texans	6	9	7	0	**22**

at NRG Stadium, Houston, Texas

- Date: October 10
- Game time: 12:00 p.m. CDT
- Game weather: None (retractable roof closed)
- Game attendance: 68,450
- Referee: Scott Novak
- TV announcers (CBS): Andrew Catalon, James Lofton and Amanda Balionis
- Recap, Game Book

Game information

**First quarter**

- HOU – Antony Auclair 11-yard pass from Davis Mills (kick failed), 4:45. Texans 6–0. **Drive: 18 plays, 79 yards, 10:06.**

**Second quarter**

- NE – Damien Harris 1-yard run (kick failed), 14:17. Tied 6–6. **Drive: 10 plays, 60 yards, 5:37.**
- HOU – Chris Moore 67-yard pass from Davis Mills (kick failed), 12:56. Texans 12–6. **Drive: 3 plays, 75 yards, 1:21.**
- HOU – Kaʻimi Fairbairn 33-yard field goal, 1:37. Texans 15–6. **Drive: 15 plays, 65 yards, 7:11.**
- NE – Nick Folk 52-yard field goal, 0:02. Texans 15–9. **Drive: 9 plays, 42 yards, 1:35.**

**Third quarter**

- HOU – Chris Conley 37-yard pass from Davis Mills (Kaʻimi Fairbairn kick), 13:31. Texans 22–9. **Drive: 2 plays, 44 yards, 0:42.**
- NE – Nick Folk 52-yard field goal, 8:25. Texans 22–12. **Drive: 4 plays, 3 yards, 1:57.**
- NE – Nick Folk 32-yard field goal, 1:50. Texans 22–15. **Drive: 7 plays, 47 yards, 3:58.**

**Fourth quarter**

- NE – Hunter Henry 13-yard pass from Mac Jones (Nick Folk kick), 9:31. Tied 22–22. **Drive: 7 plays, 54 yards, 3:54.**
- NE – Nick Folk 21-yard field goal, 0:15. Patriots 25–22. **Drive: 15 plays, 84 yards, 7:00.**

**Top passers**

- NE – Mac Jones – 23/30, 231 yards, TD, INT
- HOU – Davis Mills – 21/29, 312 yards, 3 TD

**Top rushers**

- NE – Damien Harris – 14 rushes, 58 yards, TD
- HOU – Mark Ingram II – 16 rushes, 41 yards

**Top receivers**

- NE – Hunter Henry – 6 receptions, 75 yards, TD
- HOU – Chris Moore – 5 receptions, 109 yards, TD

The Texans had a 22–9 lead early in the 3rd quarter, but the Patriots would score 16 unanswered points, including Nick Folk's game-winning field goal with 17 seconds left in the 4th. Houston kicker Kaʻimi Fairbairn missed two extra point attempts and a 56-yard field goal.

==== Week 6: at Indianapolis Colts ====
Week 6: Houston Texans at Indianapolis Colts – Game summary

Quarter	1	2	3	4	Total
Texans	0	3	0	0	**3**
**Colts**	7	3	14	7	**31**

at Lucas Oil Stadium, Indianapolis, Indiana

- Date: October 17
- Game time: 1:00 p.m. EDT/12:00 p.m. CDT
- Game weather: Sunny, 58 °F (14 °C) (retractable roof open)
- Game attendance: 57,947
- Referee: Jerome Boger
- TV announcers (CBS): Spero Dedes and Jay Feely
- Recap, Game Book

Game information

**First quarter**

- IND – Parris Campbell 51-yard pass from Carson Wentz (Michael Badgley kick), 1:52. Colts 7–0. **Drive: 7 plays, 92 yards, 3:18.**

**Second quarter**

- IND – Michael Badgley 41-yard field goal, 12:59. Colts 10–0. **Drive: 6 plays, 59 yards, 1:56.**
- HOU – Kaʻimi Fairbairn 31-yard field goal, 6:16. Colts 10–3. **Drive: 13 plays, 62 yards, 6:43.**

**Third quarter**

- IND – Mo Alie-Cox 28-yard pass from Carson Wentz (Michael Badgley kick), 11:50. Colts 17–3. **Drive: 2 plays, 28 yards, 0:46.**
- IND – Jonathan Taylor 4-yard run (Michael Badgley kick), 6:37. Colts 24–3. **Drive: 4 plays, 88 yards, 2:16.**

**Fourth quarter**

- IND – Jonathan Taylor 11-yard run (Michael Badgley kick), 4:47. Colts 31–3. **Drive: 9 plays, 63 yards, 5:21.**

**Top passers**

- HOU – Davis Mills – 29/43, 243 yards, 2 INT
- IND – Carson Wentz – 11/20, 223 yards, 2 TD

**Top rushers**

- HOU – Mark Ingram II – 18 rushes, 73 yards
- IND – Jonathan Taylor – 14 rushes, 145 yards, 2 TD

**Top receivers**

- HOU – Brandin Cooks – 9 receptions, 89 yards
- IND – T. Y. Hilton – 4 receptions, 80 yards

==== Week 7: at Arizona Cardinals ====
Week 7: Houston Texans at Arizona Cardinals – Game summary

Quarter	1	2	3	4	Total
Texans	2	3	0	0	**5**
**Cardinals**	0	17	7	7	**31**

at State Farm Stadium, Glendale, Arizona

- Date: October 24
- Game time: 3:25 p.m. CDT/1:25 p.m. MST
- Game weather: None (retractable roof closed)
- Game attendance: 60,297
- Referee: Land Clark
- TV announcers (CBS): Greg Gumbel, Adam Archuleta and AJ Ross
- Preview, Game Book

Game information

**First quarter**

- HOU – Kyler Murray sacked in the end zone by Jacob Martin for a safety, 2:58. Texans 2–0.

**Second quarter**

- HOU – Kaʻimi Fairbairn 53-yard field goal, 14:55. Texans 5–0. **Drive: 5 plays, 25 yards, 3:03.**
- ARI – DeAndre Hopkins 1-yard pass from Kyler Murray (Matt Prater kick), 9:01. Cardinals 7–5. **Drive: 14 plays, 75 yards, 5:54.**
- ARI – Christian Kirk 5-yard pass from Kyler Murray (Matt Prater kick), 2:45. Cardinals 14–5. **Drive: 6 plays, 49 yards, 2:58.**
- ARI – Matt Prater 31-yard field goal, 0:05. Cardinals 17–5. **Drive: 8 plays, 61 yards, 1:32.**

**Third quarter**

- ARI – Zach Ertz 47-yard pass from Kyler Murray (Matt Prater kick), 7:58. Cardinals 24–5. **Drive: 7 plays, 88 yards, 3:33.**

**Fourth quarter**

- ARI – James Conner 18-yard run (Matt Prater kick), 10:22. Cardinals 31–5. **Drive: 7 plays, 63 yards, 3:53.**

**Top passers**

- HOU – Davis Mills – 23/32, 135 yards
- ARI – Kyler Murray – 20/28, 261 yards, 3 TD, INT

**Top rushers**

- HOU – David Johnson – 7 rushes, 25 yards
- ARI – Chase Edmonds – 15 rushes, 81 yards

**Top receivers**

- HOU – Nico Collins – 2 receptions, 28 yards
- ARI – Zach Ertz – 3 receptions, 66 yards, TD

With the loss, the Texans' dropped to 1–6, losing their sixth game in a row. Following the game, head coach David Culley announced that quarterback Tyrod Taylor, who suffered a hamstring injury in week 2, would be returning to practice during the week.

==== Week 8: vs. Los Angeles Rams ====
Week 8: Los Angeles Rams at Houston Texans – Game summary

Quarter	1	2	3	4	Total
**Rams**	7	17	14	0	**38**
Texans	0	0	0	22	**22**

at NRG Stadium, Houston, Texas

- Date: October 31
- Game time: 12:00 p.m. CDT
- Game weather: None (retractable roof closed)
- Game attendance: 66,013
- Referee: Clay Martin
- TV announcers (Fox): Chris Myers, Daryl Johnston and Jen Hale
- Recap, Game Book

Game information

**First quarter**

- LAR – Darrell Henderson 3-yard pass from Matthew Stafford (Matt Gay kick), 9:32. Rams 7–0. **Drive: 11 plays, 75 yards, 5:28.**

**Second quarter**

- LAR – Matt Gay 27-yard field goal, 8:51. Rams 10–0. **Drive: 10 plays, 56 yards, 4:32.**
- LAR – Robert Woods 2-yard pass from Matthew Stafford (Matt Gay kick), 6:09. Rams 17–0. **Drive: 4 plays, 12 yards, 1:55.**
- LAR – Darrell Henderson 1-yard run (Matt Gay kick), 0:30. Rams 24–0. **Drive: 7 plays, 79 yards, 3:19.**

**Third quarter**

- LAR – Cooper Kupp 11-yard pass from Matthew Stafford (Matt Gay kick), 7:55. Rams 31–0. **Drive: 3 plays, 79 yards, 1:31.**
- LAR – Robert Woods 16-yard run (Matt Gay kick), 0:02. Rams 38–0. **Drive: 9 plays, 77 yards, 5:52.**

**Fourth quarter**

- HOU – Rex Burkhead 1-yard run (Kaʻimi Fairbairn kick), 8:08. Rams 38–7. **Drive: 10 plays, 60 yards, 3:55.**
- HOU – Brandin Cooks 45-yard pass from Davis Mills (Kaʻimi Fairbairn kick), 5:00. Rams 38–14. **Drive: 4 plays, 62 yards, 1:23.**
- HOU – Brevin Jordan 9-yard pass from Davis Mills (Davis Mills run), 2:35. Rams 38–22. **Drive: 6 plays, 50 yards, 2:25.**

**Top passers**

- LAR – Matthew Stafford – 21/32, 305 yards, 3 TD
- HOU – Davis Mills – 29/38, 310 yards, 2 TD, INT

**Top rushers**

- LAR – Darrell Henderson – 14 rushes, 90 yards, TD
- HOU – Rex Burkhead – 4 rushes, 21 yards, TD

**Top receivers**

- LAR – Cooper Kupp – 7 receptions, 115 yards, TD
- HOU – Brandin Cooks – 6 receptions, 83 yards, TD

==== Week 9: at Miami Dolphins ====
Week 9: Houston Texans at Miami Dolphins – Game summary

Quarter	1	2	3	4	Total
Texans	0	6	0	3	**9**
**Dolphins**	7	10	0	0	**17**

at Hard Rock Stadium, Miami Gardens, Florida

- Date: November 7
- Game time: 1:00 p.m. EST/12:00 p.m. CST
- Game weather: 72 °F (22 °C)
- Game attendance: 60,232
- Referee: Adrian Hill
- TV announcers (Fox): Chris Myers, Daryl Johnston and Jen Hale
- Recap, Game Book

Game information

**First quarter**

- MIA – Myles Gaskin 6-yard run (Jason Sanders kick), 4:37. Dolphins 7–0. **Drive: 12 plays, 80 yards, 6:03.**

**Second quarter**

- HOU – Kaʻimi Fairbairn 31-yard field goal, 9:48. Dolphins 7–3. **Drive: 7 plays, 20 yards, 3:21.**
- HOU – Kaʻimi Fairbairn 40-yard field goal, 4:32. Dolphins 7–6. **Drive: 4 plays, 1 yard, 0:58.**
- MIA – Jason Sanders 42-yard field goal, 1:08. Dolphins 10–6. **Drive: 10 plays, 51 yards, 3:24.**
- MIA – Mack Hollins 5-yard pass from Jacoby Brissett (Jason Sanders kick), 0:29. Dolphins 17–6. **Drive: 4 plays, 26 yards, 0:24.**

**Third quarter**

- No scoring plays.

**Fourth quarter**

- HOU – Kaʻimi Fairbairn 20-yard field goal, 11:32. Dolphins 17–9. **Drive: 14 plays, 92 yards, 5:40.**

**Top passers**

- HOU – Tyrod Taylor – 23/42, 231 yards, 3 INT
- MIA – Jacoby Brissett – 26/43, 244 yards, TD, 2 INT

**Top rushers**

- HOU – Phillip Lindsay – 8 rushes, 28 yards
- MIA – Myles Gaskin – 20 rushes, 34 yards, TD

**Top receivers**

- HOU – Danny Amendola – 3 receptions, 49 yards
- MIA – Jaylen Waddle – 8 receptions, 83 yards

==== Week 11: at Tennessee Titans ====
Week 11: Houston Texans at Tennessee Titans – Game summary

Quarter	1	2	3	4	Total
**Texans**	3	9	7	3	**22**
Titans	0	0	6	7	**13**

at Nissan Stadium, Nashville, Tennessee

- Date: November 21
- Game time: 12:00 p.m. CST
- Game weather: Cloudy, 56 °F (13 °C)
- Game attendance: 67,395
- Referee: Tony Corrente
- TV announcers (CBS): Andrew Catalon, James Lofton and Sherree Burruss
- Recap, Game Book

Game information

**First quarter**

- HOU – Kaʻimi Fairbairn 43-yard field goal, 4:04. Texans 3–0. **Drive: 14 plays, 62 yards, 6:58.**

**Second quarter**

- HOU – Kaʻimi Fairbairn 24-yard field goal, 13:35. Texans 6–0. **Drive: 4 plays, 0 yards, 1:25.**
- HOU – Tyrod Taylor 7-yard run (kick failed), 7:43. Texans 12–0. **Drive: 9 plays, 76 yards, 4:39.**

**Third quarter**

- HOU – Tyrod Taylor 5-yard run (Kaʻimi Fairbairn kick), 7:00. Texans 19–0. **Drive: 3 plays, 5 yards, 0:36.**
- TEN – Dez Fitzpatrick 18-yard pass from Ryan Tannehill (kick failed), 2:24. Texans 19–6. **Drive: 13 plays, 78 yards, 4:36.**

**Fourth quarter**

- TEN – Anthony Firkser fumble recovery in end zone (Randy Bullock kick), 7:47. Texans 19–13. **Drive: 6 plays, 36 yards, 2:15.**
- HOU – Kaʻimi Fairbairn 37-yard field goal, 3:26. Texans 22–13. **Drive: 4 plays, -4 yards, 0:16.**

**Top passers**

- HOU – Tyrod Taylor – 14/24, 107 yards
- TEN – Ryan Tannehill – 35/52, 323 yards, TD, 4 INT

**Top rushers**

- HOU – Rex Burkhead – 18 rushes, 40 yards
- TEN – Adrian Peterson – 9 rushes, 40 yards

**Top receivers**

- HOU – Chris Conley – 4 receptions, 37 yards
- TEN – Nick Westbrook-Ikhine – 7 receptions, 107 yards

Houston only had 190 yards of total offense compared to Tennessee's 420, but the Titans turned the ball over five times during the game and turned it over on downs twice. Tennessee quarterback Ryan Tannehill threw four interceptions, three of which happened in Houston territory. During a punt return, Chester Rogers muffed a punt that was recovered by Tremon Smith for Houston at the Tennessee 5-yard line.

==== Week 12: vs. New York Jets ====
Week 12: New York Jets at Houston Texans – Game summary

Quarter	1	2	3	4	Total
**Jets**	3	8	7	3	**21**
Texans	0	14	0	0	**14**

at NRG Stadium, Houston, Texas

- Date: November 28
- Game time: 12:00 p.m. CST
- Game weather: None (retractable roof closed)
- Game attendance: 65,120
- Referee: Clete Blakeman
- TV announcers (CBS): Spero Dedes, Jay Feely and Amanda Balionis
- Recap, Game Book

Game information

**First quarter**

- NYJ – Matt Ammendola 31-yard field goal, 5:34. Jets 3–0. **Drive: 7 plays, 24 yards, 3:28.**

**Second quarter**

- HOU – Brevin Jordan 13-yard pass from Tyrod Taylor (Kaʻimi Fairbairn kick), 14:18. Texans 7–3. **Drive: 5 plays, 24 yards, 2:47.**
- HOU – Brandin Cooks 40-yard pass from Tyrod Taylor (Kaʻimi Fairbairn kick), 10:29. Texans 14–3. **Drive: 6 plays, 67 yards, 2:47.**
- NYJ – Austin Walter 2-yard run (Josh Johnson run), 1:13. Texans 14–11. **Drive: 10 plays, 70 yards, 5:19.**

**Third quarter**

- NYJ – Zach Wilson 4-yard run (Matt Ammendola kick), 7:51. Jets 18–14. **Drive: 11 plays, 75 yards, 7:09.**

**Fourth quarter**

- NYJ – Matt Ammendola 37-yard field goal, 3:34. Jets 21–14. **Drive: 13 plays, 36 yards, 6:20.**

**Top passers**

- NYJ – Zach Wilson – 14/24, 145 yards, INT
- HOU – Tyrod Taylor – 17/26, 158 yards, 2 TD, INT

**Top rushers**

- NYJ – Tevin Coleman – 16 rushes, 67 yards
- HOU – David Johnson – 10 rushes, 39 yards

**Top receivers**

- NYJ – Braxton Berrios – 2 receptions, 47 yards
- HOU – Brandin Cooks – 3 receptions, 45 yards, TD

==== Week 13: vs. Indianapolis Colts ====
Week 13: Indianapolis Colts at Houston Texans – Game summary

Quarter	1	2	3	4	Total
**Colts**	7	7	7	10	**31**
Texans	0	0	0	0	**0**

at NRG Stadium, Houston, Texas

- Date: December 5
- Game time: 12:00 p.m. CST
- Game weather: None (retractable roof closed)
- Game attendance: 65,291
- Referee: Ronald Torbert
- TV announcers (CBS): Greg Gumbel, Adam Archuleta and AJ Ross
- Recap, Game Book

Game information

**First quarter**

- IND – Jonathan Taylor 1-yard run (Michael Badgley kick), 11:26. Colts 7–0. **Drive: 6 plays, 29 yards, 3:29.**

**Second quarter**

- IND – Ashton Dulin 2-yard pass from Carson Wentz (Michael Badgley kick), 0:43. Colts 14–0. **Drive: 11 plays, 54 yards, 6:16.**

**Third quarter**

- IND – Jonathan Taylor 3-yard run (Michael Badgley kick), 9:47. Colts 21–0. **Drive: 9 plays, 75 yards, 5:13.**

**Fourth quarter**

- IND – Michael Badgley 23-yard field goal, 9:08. Colts 24–0. **Drive: 8 plays, 55 yards, 5:08.**
- IND – Deon Jackson 3-yard run (Michael Badgley kick), 1:56. Colts 31–0. **Drive: 9 plays, 40 yards, 3:33.**

**Top passers**

- IND – Carson Wentz – 16/22, 158 yards, TD
- HOU – Davis Mills – 6/14, 49 yards

**Top rushers**

- IND – Jonathan Taylor – 32 rushes, 143 yards, 2 TD
- HOU – Rex Burkhead – 8 rushes, 30 yards

**Top receivers**

- IND – Michael Pittman Jr. – 6 receptions, 77 yards
- HOU – Brandin Cooks – 3 receptions, 38 yards

Starting quarterback Tyrod Taylor was benched in the third quarter in favor of rookie Davis Mills. Taylor finished 5-of-13 for 45 yards with an interception. With the loss, the Texans were the first team to be eliminated from playoff contention. This loss also marked the first time in franchise history the Texans were shut out at home during the regular season, and their second home shutout loss after their 30–0 Wild Card Round loss to the Kansas City Chiefs in the 2015 season.

==== Week 14: vs. Seattle Seahawks ====
Week 14: Seattle Seahawks at Houston Texans – Game summary

Quarter	1	2	3	4	Total
**Seahawks**	10	6	3	14	**33**
Texans	7	6	0	0	**13**

at NRG Stadium, Houston, Texas

- Date: December 12
- Game time: 12:00 p.m. CST
- Game weather: Clear, 55 °F (13 °C) (retractable roof open)
- Game attendance: 67,610
- Referee: Adrian Hill
- TV announcers (Fox): Chris Myers, Daryl Johnston and Jen Hale
- Recap, Game Book

Game information

**First quarter**

- HOU – Brevin Jordan – 5-yard pass from Davis Mills (Kaʻimi Fairbairn kick), 11:02. Texans 7–0. **Drive: 7 plays, 75 yards, 3:58.**
- SEA – Jason Myers 38-yard field goal, 6:20. Texans 7–3. **Drive: 9 plays, 56 yards, 4:42.**
- SEA – Rashaad Penny 32-yard run (Jason Myers kick), 0:00. Seahawks 10–7. **Drive: 7 plays, 97 yards, 3:03.**

**Second quarter**

- HOU – Kaʻimi Fairbairn 21-yard field goal, 6:05. Tied 10–10. **Drive: 16 plays, 72 yards, 8:55.**
- SEA – Tyler Lockett 55-yard pass from Russell Wilson (kick failed), 0:52. Seahawks 16–10. **Drive: 1 play, 55 yards, 0:08.**
- HOU – Kaʻimi Fairbairn 61-yard field goal, 0:00. Seahawks 16–13. **Drive: 6 plays, 15 yards, 0:52.**

**Third quarter**

- SEA – Jason Myers 38-yard field goal, 4:32. Seahawks 19–13. **Drive: 9 plays, 60 yards, 4:59.**

**Fourth quarter**

- SEA – Gerald Everett 1-yard pass from Russell Wilson (Russell Wilson–Tyler Lockett pass), 7:28. Seahawks 27–13. **Drive: 10 plays, 67 yards, 4:10.**
- SEA – Rashaad Penny 47-yard run (kick failed), 5:26. Seahawks 33–13. **Drive: 2 plays, 50 yards, 0:50.**

**Top passers**

- SEA – Russell Wilson – 17/28, 260 yards, 2 TD
- HOU – Davis Mills – 33/49, 331 yards, TD

**Top rushers**

- SEA – Rashaad Penny – 16 rushes, 137 yards, 2 TD
- HOU – Rex Burkhead – 11 rushes, 40 yards

**Top receivers**

- SEA – Tyler Lockett – 5 receptions, 142 yards, TD
- HOU – Brandin Cooks – 8 receptions, 101 yards

At the end of the first half, kicker Kaʻimi Fairbairn made a 61-yard field goal, setting a franchise record for longest field goal made.

==== Week 15: at Jacksonville Jaguars ====
Week 15: Houston Texans at Jacksonville Jaguars – Game summary

Quarter	1	2	3	4	Total
**Texans**	14	6	3	7	**30**
Jaguars	3	7	3	3	**16**

at TIAA Bank Field, Jacksonville, Florida

- Date: December 19
- Game time: 1:00 p.m. EST/12:00 p.m. CST
- Game weather: 76 °F (24 °C)
- Game attendance: 60,252
- Referee: Alex Kemp
- TV announcers (CBS): Andrew Catalon, James Lofton and Sherree Burruss
- Recap, Game Book

Game information

**First quarter**

- HOU – Brandin Cooks 22-yard pass from Davis Mills (Kaʻimi Fairbairn kick), 6:39. Texans 7–0. **Drive: 15 plays, 75 yards, 8:21.**
- JAX – Matthew Wright 22-yard field goal, 1:42. Texans 7–3. **Drive: 9 plays, 79 yards, 4:57.**
- HOU – Tremon Smith 98-yard kickoff return (Kaʻimi Fairbairn kick), 1:26. Texans 14–3.

**Second quarter**

- JAX – James Robinson 1-yard run (Matthew Wright kick), 12:09. Texans 14–10. **Drive: 10 plays, 75 yards, 4:17.**
- HOU – Kaʻimi Fairbairn 52-yard field goal, 3:06. Texans 17–10. **Drive: 7 plays, 15 yards, 4:43.**
- HOU – Kaʻimi Fairbairn 51-yard field goal, 0:00. Texans 20–10. **Drive: 5 plays, 29 yards, 0:21.**

**Third quarter**

- HOU – Kaʻimi Fairbairn 25-yard field goal, 10:39. Texans 23–10. **Drive: 7 plays, 40 yards, 2:13.**
- JAX – Matthew Wright 38-yard field goal, 4:47. Texans 23–13. **Drive: 12 plays, 55 yards, 5:52.**

**Fourth quarter**

- JAX – Matthew Wright 35-yard field goal, 11:18. Texans 23–16. **Drive: 4 plays, 5 yards, 2:04.**
- HOU – Brandin Cooks 43-yard pass from Davis Mills (Kaʻimi Fairbairn kick), 2:22. Texans 30–16. **Drive: 6 plays, 55 yards, 2:47.**

**Top passers**

- HOU – Davis Mills – 19/30, 209 yards, 2 TD, INT
- JAX – Trevor Lawrence – 22/38, 210 yards

**Top rushers**

- HOU – Rex Burkhead – 16 rushes, 91 yards
- JAX – James Robinson – 18 rushes, 75 yards, TD

**Top receivers**

- HOU – Brandin Cooks – 7 receptions, 102 yards, 2 TD
- JAX – James O'Shaughnessy – 4 receptions, 60 yards

With the win, the Texans swept the Jacksonville Jaguars for the fourth season in a row. This was also the first victory for rookie quarterback Davis Mills.

==== Week 16: vs. Los Angeles Chargers ====
Week 16: Los Angeles Chargers at Houston Texans – Game summary

Quarter	1	2	3	4	Total
Chargers	6	6	3	14	**29**
**Texans**	7	10	0	24	**41**

at NRG Stadium, Houston, Texas

- Date: December 26
- Game time: 12:00 p.m. CST
- Game weather: None (retractable roof closed)
- Game attendance: 65,674
- Referee: Clay Martin
- TV announcers (CBS): Andrew Catalon, James Lofton and Sherree Burruss
- Recap, Game Book

Game information

**First quarter**

- LAC – Dustin Hopkins 50-yard field goal, 10:55. Chargers 3–0. **Drive: 8 plays, 43 yards, 4:05.**
- HOU – Rex Burkhead 25-yard run (Dominik Eberle kick), 6:25. Texans 7–3. **Drive: 8 plays, 75 yards, 4:30.**
- LAC – Dustin Hopkins 46-yard field goal, 1:57. Texans 7–6. **Drive: 9 plays, 54 yards, 4:28.**

**Second quarter**

- LAC – Justin Jackson 17-yard run (run failed), 11:15. Chargers 12–7. **Drive: 7 plays, 70 yards, 3:38.**
- HOU – Dominik Eberle 51-yard field goal, 5:11. Chargers 12–10. **Drive: 12 plays, 42 yards, 6:04.**
- HOU – Chris Conley 41-yard pass from Davis Mills (Dominik Eberle kick), 0:27. Texans 17–12. **Drive: 7 plays, 94 yards, 3:30.**

**Third quarter**

- LAC – Dustin Hopkins 35-yard field goal, 5:42. Texans 17–15. **Drive: 11 plays, 41 yards, 5:25.**

**Fourth quarter**

- HOU – Rex Burkhead 1-yard run (Dominik Eberle kick), 13:37. Texans 24–15. **Drive: 13 plays, 75 yards, 7:05.**
- HOU – Dominik Eberle 25-yard field goal, 8:54. Texans 27–15. **Drive: 8 plays, 40 yards, 3:54.**
- LAC – Justin Jackson 9-yard run (Justin Herbert–Jared Cook pass), 5:50. Texans 27–23. **Drive: 9 plays, 75 yards, 3:04.**
- HOU – Nico Collins 13-yard pass from Davis Mills (Dominik Eberle kick), 2:32. Texans 34–23. **Drive: 7 plays, 72 yards, 3:18.**
- HOU – Tavierre Thomas 48-yard interception return (Dominik Eberle kick), 1:49. Texans 41–23.
- LAC – Joshua Palmer 3-yard pass from Justin Herbert (pass failed), 0:34. Texans 41–29. **Drive: 6 plays, 75 yards, 1:15.**

**Top passers**

- LAC – Justin Herbert – 27/35, 336 yards, TD, 2 INT
- HOU – Davis Mills – 21/27, 254 yards, 2 TD

**Top rushers**

- LAC – Justin Jackson – 11 rushes, 64 yards, 2 TD
- HOU – Rex Burkhead – 22 rushes, 149 yards, 2 TD

**Top receivers**

- LAC – Justin Jackson – 8 receptions, 98 yards
- HOU – Chris Conley – 3 receptions, 60 yards, TD

The Houston Texans hosted the Los Angeles Chargers for the penultimate home game of the season, with both teams missing several players due to the NFL's COVID-19 protocols. The game was close for the first three quarters, but a 24-point fourth quarter by the Texans put the game out of reach for the Chargers, including scoring 14 unanswered points in under a minute. Running back Rex Burkhead finished the game with a career high 149 rushing yards, the most by a Texans' running back since Carlos Hyde in week 9 of the 2019 season. With the win, the Texans improved to 4–11, matching their win total from the previous season.

==== Week 17: at San Francisco 49ers ====
Week 17: Houston Texans at San Francisco 49ers – Game summary

Quarter	1	2	3	4	Total
Texans	0	7	0	0	**7**
**49ers**	0	3	7	13	**23**

at Levi's Stadium, Santa Clara, California

- Date: January 2
- Game time: 3:05 p.m. CST/1:05 p.m. PST
- Game weather: Clear, 64 °F (18 °C)
- Game attendance: 71,612
- Referee: Carl Cheffers
- TV announcers (CBS): Greg Gumbel, Adam Archuleta and AJ Ross
- Recap, Game Book

Game information

**First quarter**

- No scoring plays.

**Second quarter**

- HOU – Brandin Cooks 8-yard pass from Davis Mills (Kaʻimi Fairbairn kick) 1:57. Texans 7–0. **Drive: 14 plays, 80 yards, 7:15.**
- SF – Robbie Gould 37-yard field goal, 0:00. Texans 7–3. **Drive: 6 plays, 56 yards, 0:38.**

**Third quarter**

- SF – Elijah Mitchell 8-yard pass from Trey Lance (Robbie Gould kick), 5:53. 49ers 10–7. **Drive: 4 plays, 58 yards, 2:21.**

**Fourth quarter**

- SF – Deebo Samuel 45-yard pass from Trey Lance (Robbie Gould kick), 9:56. 49ers 17–7. **Drive: 4 plays, 65 yards, 2:08.**
- SF – Robbie Gould 27-yard field goal, 3:19. 49ers 20–7. **Drive: 10 plays, 71 yards, 3:27.**
- SF – Robbie Gould 36-yard field goal, 1:12. 49ers 23–7. **Drive: 4 plays, 9 yards, 1:29.**

**Top passers**

- HOU – Davis Mills – 21/32, 163 yards, TD, INT
- SF – Trey Lance – 16/23, 249 yards, 2 TD, INT

**Top rushers**

- HOU – Rex Burkhead – 16 rushes, 47 yards
- SF – Elijah Mitchell – 21 rushes, 119 yards

**Top receivers**

- HOU – Brandin Cooks – 7 receptions, 66 yards, TD
- SF – Brandon Aiyuk – 4 receptions, 94 yards

==== Week 18: vs. Tennessee Titans ====
Week 18: Tennessee Titans at Houston Texans – Game summary

Quarter	1	2	3	4	Total
**Titans**	0	21	0	7	**28**
Texans	0	0	10	15	**25**

at NRG Stadium, Houston, Texas

- Date: January 9
- Game time: 12:00 p.m. CST
- Game weather: None (retractable roof closed)
- Game attendance: 66,722
- Referee: Land Clark
- TV announcers (CBS): Andrew Catalon, James Lofton and Sherree Burruss
- Recap, Game Book

Game information

**First quarter**

- No scoring plays

**Second quarter**

- TEN – Anthony Firkser 5-yard pass from Ryan Tannehill (Randy Bullock kick), 7:40. Titans 7–0. **Drive: 11 plays, 94 yards, 6:31.**
- TEN – A. J. Brown 14-yard pass from Ryan Tannehill (Randy Bullock kick), 1:34. Titans 14–0. **Drive: 9 plays, 85 yards, 2:46.**
- TEN – Nick Westbrook-Ikhine 4-yard pass from Ryan Tannehill (Randy Bullock kick), 0:11. Titans 21–0. **Drive: 5 plays, 64 yards, 0:33.**

**Third quarter**

- HOU – Chris Moore 28-yard pass from Davis Mills (Kaʻimi Fairbairn kick), 9:46. Titans 21–7. **Drive: 8 plays, 72 yards, 3:42.**
- HOU – Kaʻimi Fairbairn 31-yard field goal, 2:14. Titans 21–10. **Drive: 8 plays, 52 yards, 4:04.**

**Fourth quarter**

- HOU – Danny Amendola 7-yard pass from Davis Mills (Davis Mills–Danny Amendola pass), 11:40. Titans 21–18. **Drive: 8 plays, 82 yards, 4:01.**
- TEN – Julio Jones 3-yard pass from Ryan Tannehill (Randy Bullock kick), 7:00. Titans 28–18. **Drive: 8 plays, 75 yards, 4:40.**
- HOU – Danny Amendola 26-yard pass from Davis Mills (Kaʻimi Fairbairn kick), 4:04. Titans 28–25. **Drive: 7 plays, 75 yards, 2:56.**

**Top passers**

- TEN – Ryan Tannehill – 23/32, 287 yards, 4 TD
- HOU – Davis Mills – 23/33, 301 yards, 3 TD

**Top rushers**

- TEN – D'Onta Foreman – 21 rushes, 69 yards
- HOU – David Johnson – 5 rushes, 28 yards

**Top receivers**

- TEN – Nick Westbrook-Ikhine – 4 receptions, 78 yards, TD
- HOU – Danny Amendola – 7 receptions, 113 yards, 2 TD

=== Standings ===
==== Division ====
AFC South
	W	L	T	PCT	DIV	CONF	PF	PA	STK
^{(1)} Tennessee Titans	12	5	0	.706	5–1	8–4	419	354	W3
Indianapolis Colts	9	8	0	.529	3–3	7–5	451	365	L2
Houston Texans	4	13	0	.235	3–3	4–8	280	452	L2
Jacksonville Jaguars	3	14	0	.176	1–5	3–9	253	457	W1

==== Conference ====
AFC
#	Team	Division	W	L	T	PCT	DIV	CONF	SOS	SOV	STK
**Division winners**
1 (Note: Tennessee finished ahead of Kansas City based on head-to-head victory, claiming the No. 1 seed.)	Tennessee Titans	South	12	5	0	.706	5–1	8–4	.472	.480	W3
2	Kansas City Chiefs	West	12	5	0	.706	5–1	7–5	.538	.517	W1
3	Buffalo Bills	East	11	6	0	.647	5–1	7–5	.472	.428	W4
4	Cincinnati Bengals	North	10	7	0	.588	4–2	8–4	.472	.462	L1
**Wild cards**
5 (Note: Las Vegas claimed the No. 5 seed over New England based on win percentage in common games (5–1 vs. 2–4 against: Miami, Dallas, LA Chargers, Cleveland, and Indianapolis).)	Las Vegas Raiders	West	10	7	0	.588	3–3	8–4	.510	.515	W4
6	New England Patriots	East	10	7	0	.588	3–3	8–4	.481	.394	L1
7	Pittsburgh Steelers	North	9	7	1	.559	4–2	7–5	.521	.490	W2
**Did not qualify for the postseason**
8 (Note: Indianapolis finished ahead of Miami and Los Angeles based on conference record (7–5 vs. 6–6).)	Indianapolis Colts	South	9	8	0	.529	3–3	7–5	.495	.431	L2
9 (Note: Miami finished ahead of LA Chargers based on win percentage in common games (5–1 vs. 2–4 against: New England, Las Vegas, Houston, Baltimore, and NY Giants).)	Miami Dolphins	East	9	8	0	.529	4–2	6–6	.464	.379	W1
10	Los Angeles Chargers	West	9	8	0	.529	3–3	6–6	.510	.500	L1
11 (Note: Cleveland finished ahead of Baltimore based on division record (3–3 vs. 1–5).)	Cleveland Browns	North	8	9	0	.471	3–3	5–7	.514	.415	W1
12	Baltimore Ravens	North	8	9	0	.471	1–5	5–7	.531	.460	L6
13	Denver Broncos	West	7	10	0	.412	1–5	3–9	.484	.357	L4
14 (Note: NY Jets finished ahead of Houston based on head-to-head victory.)	New York Jets	East	4	13	0	.235	0–6	4–8	.512	.426	L2
15	Houston Texans	South	4	13	0	.235	3–3	4–8	.498	.397	L2
16	Jacksonville Jaguars	South	3	14	0	.176	1–5	3–9	.512	.569	W1
**Tiebreakers** (Note: When breaking ties for three or more teams under the NFL's rules, they are first broken within divisions, then comparing only the highest-ranked remaining team from each division.)

== Statistics ==
=== Team ===
Category	Total yards	Yards per game	NFL rank (out of 32)
Passing offense	3,305	194.4	28th
Rushing offense	1,422	83.6	32nd
Total offense	4,727	278.1	32nd
Passing defense	4,409	259.4	23rd
Rushing defense	2,351	138.3	31st
Total defense	6,760	397.6	31st

=== Individual ===
Category	Player	Total
Offense
Passing yards	Davis Mills	2,664
Passing touchdowns	Davis Mills	16
Rushing yards	Rex Burkhead	427
Rushing touchdowns	Tyrod Taylor; Rex Burkhead	3
Receiving yards	Brandin Cooks	1,037
Receiving touchdowns	Brandin Cooks	6
Defense
Tackles (Solo)	Kamu Grugier-Hill	71
Sacks	Jonathan Greenard	8
Interceptions	Lonnie Johnson Jr. Desmond King	3

== See also ==
- 2007 Atlanta Falcons season, whose quarterback, Michael Vick, was suspended due to personal conduct reasons but not released.
