= Tim Kelly (American football) =

American football coach (born 1986)

New York Giants
- Title: Tight ends coach

Personal information
- Born: August 17, 1986 (age 40); Chicago Heights, Illinois, U.S.

Career information
- Position: Defensive tackle
- High school: Marian Catholic (IL)
- College: Eastern Illinois

Career history
- Illinois Wesleyan (2008–2009) Graduate assistant; Minnesota State–Moorhead (2010) Defensive coordinator & defensive line coach; Ball State (2011) Graduate assistant; Penn State (2012–2013) Graduate assistant; Houston Texans (2014–2021); Offensive quality control coach (2014–2015); Offensive quality control & assistant offensive line coach (2016); Tight ends coach (2017–2018); Offensive coordinator (2019); Offensive coordinator & quarterbacks coach (2020); Offensive coordinator (2021); Tennessee Titans (2022–2023); Passing game coordinator (2022); Offensive coordinator (2023); New York Giants (2024–present); Tight ends coach (2024–present); Interim offensive coordinator (2025)
- Coaching profile at Pro Football Reference

Timothy Kelly (born August 17, 1986) is an American football coach who is currently the tight ends coach for the New York Giants. He previously served as the offensive coordinator for the Tennessee Titans in 2023 and also coached with the Houston Texans in various assistant roles, including offensive coordinator, between 2014 and 2021. Kelly has also served as an assistant coach for several college football teams. He attended Eastern Illinois University, where he also played for their football team.

== Coaching career ==
=== Penn State ===
In 2012 and 2013, Kelly worked as a graduate assistant for Penn State.

=== Houston Texans ===
In 2014, Kelly was hired as the offensive quality control coach for the Houston Texans under new head coach Bill O'Brien. Kelly served as the tight ends coach in 2017 and 2018. On February 5, 2019, he was promoted to offensive coordinator. In 2020, Kelly was given an additional role as quarterbacks coach.

On March 10, 2021, Kelly was retained as offensive coordinator under new head coach David Culley.

On January 13, 2022, Kelly and Culley were fired by the Texans.

=== Tennessee Titans ===
On February 4, 2022, Kelly was hired by the Tennessee Titans as their passing game coordinator under head coach Mike Vrabel.

On February 7, 2023, Kelly was promoted to offensive coordinator after Todd Downing was fired. Following the season, Vrabel was fired and was replaced with Brian Callahan. On January 27, 2024, Kelly was fired as offensive coordinator.

=== New York Giants ===
On February 6, 2024, Kelly was hired by the New York Giants as their tight ends coach under head coach Brian Daboll, replacing Andy Bischoff, who left to take the same position with the Los Angeles Chargers.

Following the firing of Brian Daboll, assistant head coach & offensive coordinator Mike Kafka was named the interim head coach, while Kelly was named as interim offensive coordinator on November 12, 2025.

Following the 2025 season, Kelly was retained by new head coach John Harbaugh as his tight ends coach.

== Personal life ==
Kelly's brother, Dennis, played offensive tackle at Purdue before being drafted by the Philadelphia Eagles in the fifth round of the 2012 NFL draft.
