= Roy Lopez =

Roy Lopez may refer to:

- Roy Lopez (American football) (born 1997), American football player
- Roy Lopez Jr., criminal and member of the Bling Ring

== See also ==
- Ruy Lopez (disambiguation)
