= Ruy López =

Ruy López may refer to:

- Ruy López de Segura (c. 1530 – c. 1580), Spanish priest and early chess master
  - Ruy Lopez, one of the oldest and most popular chess openings, named after him, also known as the "Spanish Opening"
- Ruy López de Villalobos (c. 1500–1546), Spanish navigator

== See also ==
- Roy Lopez (disambiguation)
