= Rex Burkhead =

American football player (born 1990)

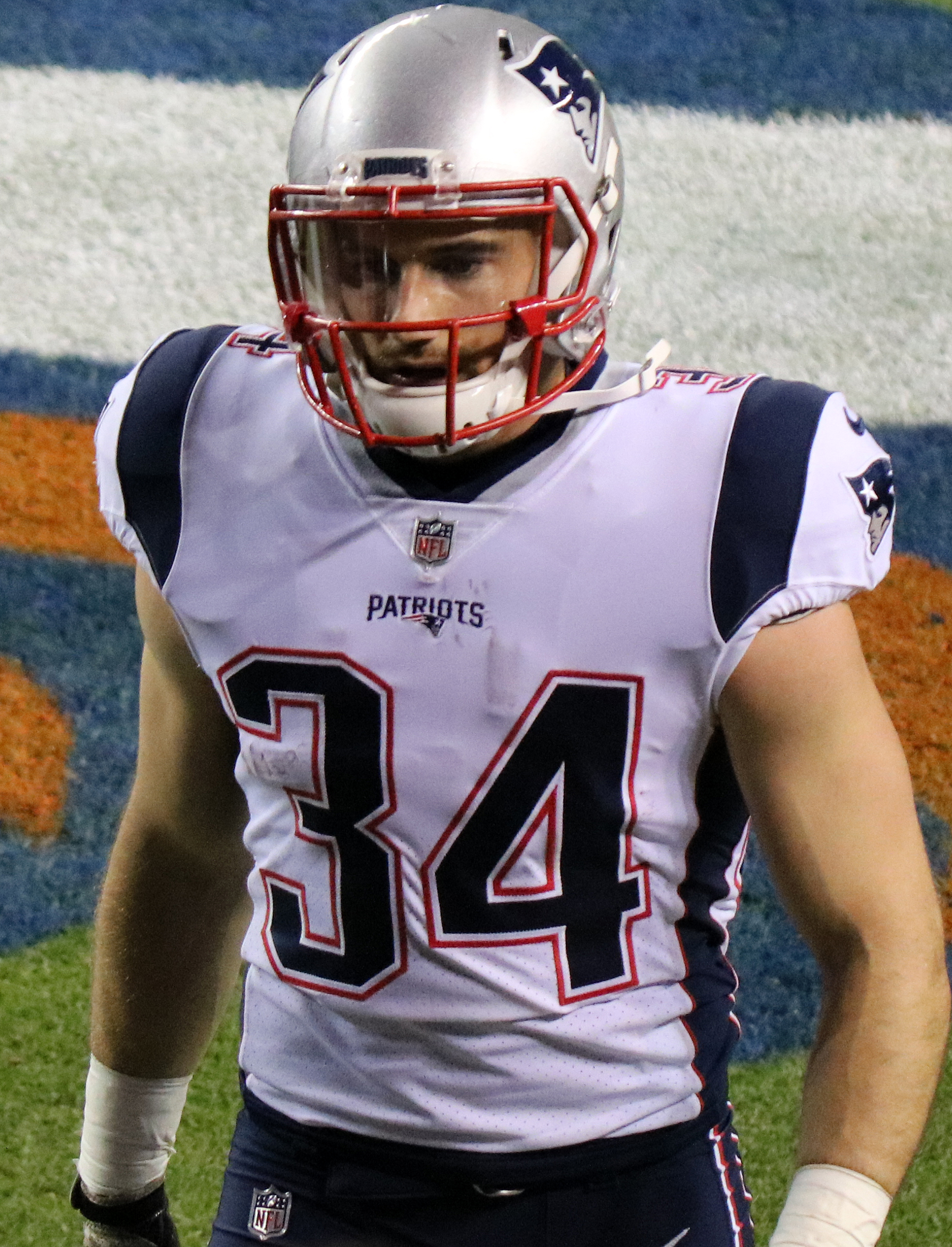
- Burkhead with the New England Patriots in 2017

No. 33, 34, 28
- Position: Running back

Personal information
- Born: July 2, 1990 (age 36); Winchester, Kentucky, U.S.
- Listed height: 5 ft 10 in (1.78 m)
- Listed weight: 215 lb (98 kg)

Career information
- High school: Plano Senior (Plano, Texas)
- College: Nebraska (2009–2012)
- NFL draft: 2013: 6th round, 190th overall pick

Career history
- Cincinnati Bengals (2013–2016); New England Patriots (2017–2020); Houston Texans (2021–2022)

Awards and highlights
- Super Bowl champion (LIII); First-team All-Big Ten (2011)

Career NFL statistics
- Rushing yards: 1,908
- Rushing average: 3.9
- Rushing touchdowns: 17
- Receptions: 192
- Receiving yards: 1,534
- Return yards: 131
- Receiving touchdowns: 9
- Stats at Pro Football Reference

Rex Burkhead (born July 2, 1990) is an American former professional football player who was a running back in the National Football League (NFL) for 10 seasons. He played college football for the Nebraska Cornhuskers and was selected by the Cincinnati Bengals in the sixth round of the 2013 NFL draft. After four seasons with the Bengals, Burkhead spent his next four seasons with the New England Patriots, where he appeared in consecutive Super Bowls and won Super Bowl LIII, the second of the two Super Bowls he appeared in. Burkhead signed with the Houston Texans in 2021 and spent the next two seasons with them. Burkhead spent the 2023 NFL season as an un-signed free agent and announced his retirement from professional football during the offseason of the 2024 season.

== Early life ==
Burkhead was born in Winchester, Kentucky, and raised in the Dallas-Fort Worth area of Texas. He attended Plano Senior High School in Plano, Texas, where he played high school football for the Wildcats. Burkhead was on the varsity team for all four years of his high school career and even played in the division 5A basketball playoffs his senior year. As a junior, he rushed for 1,762 yards and 28 touchdowns, leading the school to a state semifinal appearance in the Texas 5-A football playoffs. Burkhead earned first-team all-district honors in basketball as a junior and senior, and as a freshman he was part of Class 5A state championship basketball team.

== College career ==
As a freshman at the University of Nebraska in 2009, Burkhead played in nine games, rushing for 346 yards on 81 carries with three touchdowns.

As a sophomore in 2010, Burkhead was second on the depth chart behind senior Roy Helu. Burkhead played in all 14 games as the backup, and rushed for 951 yards on 172 carries and seven touchdowns.

As a junior in 2011, Burkhead took over as the starting running back as a junior. Nebraska had little experience at running back that season, and Burkhead got the majority of the carries, including a school-record 38 carries against the Iowa Hawkeyes. He ended up rushing for 1,357 yards on 284 carries with 15 touchdowns and was named a first team All-Big Ten selection.

As a senior in 2012, with expectations high, Burkhead sprained his knee in the season opener and missed two games before re-injuring the knee four games later. Burkhead missed six games total in the season, but still finished with five touchdowns and 675 yards on 98 carries for a 6.9 yard average. He was considered the ninth or tenth best running back prospect for the 2013 NFL draft and was ranked in the top 150 overall.

Burkhead graduated from Nebraska in three-and-a-half years with a bachelor's degree in history. He earned repeated scholar-athlete awards throughout his career, including first-team CoSIDA Academic All-American in 2011 and 2012, and recognition as one of 15 National Football Foundation Scholar Athletes in 2012.

== Professional career ==
Pre-draft measurables
Height	Weight	Arm length	Hand span	40-yard dash	10-yard split	20-yard split	20-yard shuttle	Three-cone drill	Vertical jump	Broad jump	Bench press
5 ft 10 1/4 in (1.78 m)	214 lb (97 kg)	30 7/8 in (0.78 m)	9 3/4 in (0.25 m)	4.73 s	1.63 s	2.73 s	4.09 s	6.85 s	39 in (0.99 m)	10 ft 5 in (3.18 m)	21 reps
All values from NFL Combine

=== Cincinnati Bengals ===
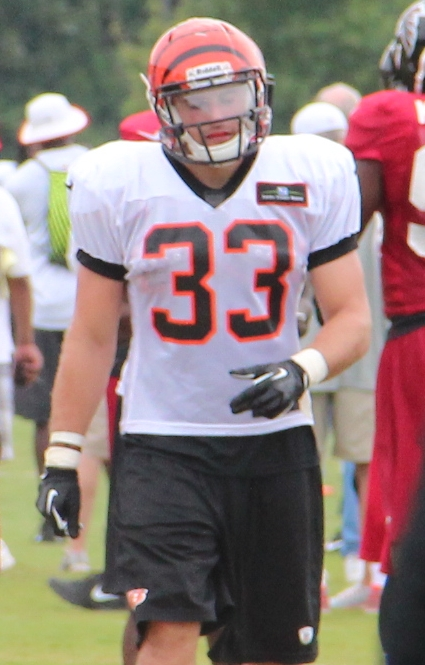
Burkhead in 2013

After being selected by the Cincinnati Bengals in the sixth round (190th overall) of the 2013 NFL draft, Burkhead signed with the team on May 13, 2013. He played in all four preseason games, rushing 28 times for 130 yards and a touchdown, and five receptions for 39 yards. However, plagued by a hamstring injury all season, Burkhead was active for only one of the team's 16 games, making his NFL debut on November 10 playing on special teams in a 20–17 loss to the Baltimore Ravens.

In 2014, Burkhead played in nine games for the Bengals, mainly on special teams. On offense, he had nine rushes for 27 yards and his first career touchdown (against the Cleveland Browns) and seven receptions for 49 yards. He had the most productive game of his career in the Bengals' Wild Card Round loss to the Indianapolis Colts, in which Burkhead started at wide receiver and totaled three receptions for 34 yards and one rush for 23 yards.

Burkhead played in all 16 regular season games for the Bengals in 2015, seeing action primarily on special teams. As a running back, he rushed four times for four yards, while catching 10 passes for 94 yards and a receiving touchdown.

In 2016, Burkhead appeared in all 16 regular season games for the Bengals, including one start at running back. With regular playing time on offense, he rushed 74 times for 344 yards and two touchdowns. He also caught 17 passes for 145 yards. In the Bengals' Week 17 game against the Baltimore Ravens, Burkhead carried the ball 27 times for 119 yards.

=== New England Patriots ===
==== 2017 season: Super Bowl LII appearance ====
On March 14, 2017, Burkhead signed a one-year contract with the New England Patriots worth up to $3.15 million.

On September 7, on Thursday Night Football, Burkhead made his debut as a member of the Patriots. He was in the starting lineup and had three rushes for 15 yards and one reception for eight yards in the 42–27 loss to the Kansas City Chiefs. On September 17, against the New Orleans Saints in Week 2, he recorded his first touchdown as a member of the Patriots when he hauled in a 19-yard pass from quarterback Tom Brady in the first quarter of the 36–20 victory. He finished the game with three receptions for 41 yards. On November 12, 2017, during Week 10 against the Denver Broncos, Burkhead had 10 rushes for 36 rushing yards, three receptions for 27 receiving yards and a receiving touchdown, and a blocked punt. He thus became the first player to both catch a touchdown pass and block a punt in the same NFL game since 1977. Burkhead finished his first season with the Patriots with 64 carries for 264 rushing yards and five rushing touchdowns and recorded 30 catches for 254 receiving yards and three receiving touchdowns. In the playoffs, the Patriots defeated the Tennessee Titans in the Divisional Round without Burkhead, but Burkhead returned for the AFC Championship Game where he recorded one carry for five yards in the 24–20 victory against the Jacksonville Jaguars to reach Super Bowl LII. The Patriots lost 41–33 to the Philadelphia Eagles. Burkhead recorded three carries for 18 yards and caught a pass for 46 yards in the Super Bowl.

==== 2018 season: Super Bowl LIII championship ====
On March 14, 2018, Burkhead signed a three-year contract extension with the Patriots. In Week 3 against the Detroit Lions, Burkhead suffered a neck injury and was placed on injured reserve on September 26, 2018. He was activated off injured reserve on November 26, 2018. The Patriots won the AFC East and earned the #2-seed for the AFC Playoffs.

On January 13, 2019, Burkhead scored his first-ever postseason touchdown in the Divisional Round with a six-yard run against the Los Angeles Chargers in a game New England won 41–28. A week later, he scored the game-winning touchdown in overtime as part of the AFC Championship Game against the Kansas City Chiefs. The Patriots won the coin toss, which eventually set up the offense with a 1st and 10 at the Kansas City 15-yard line. Burkhead ran up the middle for 10 yards and another three yards on the next play setting up 1st and Goal. Burkhead ran again up the middle for a two-yard touchdown, sending the Patriots to Super Bowl LIII. Before his overtime touchdown, Burkhead had previously scored a rushing touchdown with 39 seconds left to give the Patriots a 31–28 lead, though the Chiefs responded with a 39-yard field goal to force overtime. Burkhead finished the game with 12 carries for 41 yards and two touchdowns and had the game's longest run from scrimmage (14 yards). He also had four receptions for 28 yards.

During the Super Bowl, Burkhead finished with 43 rushing yards, had the longest rushing play of the game (26 yards, tied with Sony Michel), and led all running backs from both teams with a 6.1 yards-per-carry average, as the Patriots defeated the Los Angeles Rams by a score of 13–3 in the lowest-scoring Super Bowl in history. In New England's three playoff games, Burkhead totaled seven receptions on seven targets for 45 yards and registered one tackle on special teams.

==== 2019 season ====
In the 2019 season, Burkhead finished with 302 rushing yards and three rushing touchdowns to go along with 27 receptions for 279 receiving yards in 13 games.

==== 2020 season ====
In Week 3 of the 2020 season, Burkhead recorded 98 scrimmage yards to go along with two rushing touchdowns and one receiving touchdown in the 36–20 victory over the Las Vegas Raiders. In Week 10 against the Baltimore Ravens on Sunday Night Football, Burkhead had two receiving touchdowns, including one thrown by wide receiver Jakobi Meyers on a trick play, during the 23–17 victory. On November 22, 2020, Burkhead suffered a season-ending knee injury in a 27–20 loss to the Houston Texans. He was placed on injured reserve on November 28, 2020. He finished the 2020 season with 67 carries for 274 rushing yards and three rushing touchdowns to go along with 25 receptions for 192 receiving yards and three receiving touchdowns.

=== Houston Texans ===
On June 1, 2021, Burkhead signed a one-year, $1.5 million contract with the Houston Texans that included a $125K signing bonus. In Week 16, against the Los Angeles Chargers, Burkhead finished the game with a career high 149 rushing yards along with two touchdowns in the 41–29 victory. For his performance, Burkhead was named the FedEx Ground Player of the Week. Overall, in the 2021 season, Burkhead finished with 122 carries for 427 yards and three touchdowns to go along with 25 receptions for 186 yards in 16 games and five starts.

On January 7, 2022, Burkhead signed a contract extension with the Texans through the 2022 season. He finished the season with 26 carries for 86 yards to go along with 37 receptions for 204 yards and a touchdown in 16 games and no starts.

=== Retirement ===
On February 5, 2024, Burkhead announced his retirement from the NFL after 10 seasons after sitting out the entire 2023 season.

== Career statistics ==
=== NFL ===
Legend
	Won the Super Bowl
**Bold**	Career high

==== Regular season ====
Year	Team	Games		Rushing					Receiving					Fumbles	
Year	Team	GP	GS	Att	Yds	Avg	Lng	TD	Rec	Yds	Avg	Lng	TD	Fum	Lost
2013	CIN	1	0	0	0	0.0	0	0	0	0	0.0	0	0	0	0
2014	CIN	9	0	9	27	3.0	10	1	7	49	7.0	15	0	0	0
2015	CIN	**16**	0	4	4	2.0	2	0	10	94	9.4	27	1	1	**1**
2016	CIN	**16**	1	74	344	4.6	17	2	17	145	8.5	18	0	1	**1**
2017	NE	10	3	64	264	4.1	31	**5**	30	254	8.5	23	**3**	1	0
2018	NE	8	4	57	186	3.3	12	0	14	131	9.4	25	1	**2**	**1**
2019	NE	13	1	65	302	**4.7**	33	3	27	**279**	**10.3**	**32**	0	1	**1**
2020	NE	10	0	67	274	4.1	18	3	25	192	7.7	24	**3**	0	0
2021	HOU	**16**	**5**	**122**	**427**	3.5	**36**	3	25	186	7.4	20	0	1	0
2022	HOU	**16**	0	26	80	3.1	9	0	**37**	204	5.5	17	1	0	0
Career		115	14	488	1,908	3.9	36	17	192	1,534	8.0	32	9	7	4

==== Postseason ====
Year	Team	Games		Rushing					Receiving					Fumbles	
Year	Team	GP	GS	Att	Yds	Avg	Lng	TD	Rec	Yds	Avg	Lng	TD	Fum	Lost
2014	CIN	1	**1**	1	23	**23.0**	23	0	3	34	11.3	26	0	0	0
2015	CIN	1	0	1	4	4.0	4	0	1	5	5.0	5	0	0	0
2017	NE	2	0	4	23	5.8	9	0	1	**46**	**46.0**	**46**	0	0	0
2018	NE	**3**	**1**	**23**	**96**	4.2	**26**	**3**	**7**	45	6.4	8	0	0	0
2019	NE	1	0	3	4	1.3	4	0	3	32	10.7	12	0	0	0
Career		8	2	32	150	4.7	26	3	15	162	10.8	46	0	0	0

=== College ===
Season	Team	Rushing					Receiving				
Season	Team	Att	Yds	Avg	Lng	TD	Rec	Yds	Avg	Lng	TD
2009	Nebraska	81	349	4.3	34	3	11	92	8.4	24	1
2010	Nebraska	172	951	5.5	33	7	15	148	9.9	31	0
2011	Nebraska	284	1,357	4.8	52	15	21	177	8.4	30	2
2012	Nebraska	98	675	6.9	73	5	11	92	8.4	25	2
Career		635	3,329	5.2	73	30	60	507	8.5	31	5

== Personal life ==
Burkhead is married to Danielle Burkhead. They have two sons.

Burkhead was the 2012 winner of the Uplifting Athletes Rare Disease Champion award. He was awarded for his work with a 6-year-old suffering from a rare pediatric brain tumor called a low-grade glioma. Burkhead's commitment to community service has been personified by his friendship with that child, Jack Hoffman, a cancer patient from Atkinson, Nebraska. Jack contacted Nebraska in 2011, asking for a Burkhead photo. Burkhead offered to meet Jack, and his involvement in their relationship led to national notice when he arranged for Jack to suit up in a Cornhusker uniform and "run for a touchdown" in the 2013 Nebraska spring football game before a crowd of more than 60,000. President Barack Obama responded by inviting Jack and his family to the White House, and the family included Burkhead in its party. In honor of Jack Hoffman, who died at age 19 in January 2025, Burkhead launched the Team Jack Foundation.
