= Andy Bischoff =

American football coach (born 1970)

Personal information
- Born: December 8, 1970 (age 55); Fargo, North Dakota, U.S.

Career information
- High school: Central (Saint Paul, Minnesota)
- College: South Dakota

Career history
- Cretin-Derham Hall HS (1993–1997) Offensive line coach; Cretin-Derham Hall HS (1998–1999) Offensive line coach/run game coordinator; Cretin-Derham Hall HS (2000–2003) Co-offensive coordinator; Cretin-Derham Hall HS (2004–2007) Assistant head coach/offensive coordinator; Montreal Alouettes (2008–2009) Running backs/offensive quality control coach; Montreal Alouettes (2010–2012) Running backs coach/special teams coordinator/assistant to the head coach; Chicago Bears (2013–2014) Tight ends coach/staff coordinator; Baltimore Ravens (2015) Offensive quality control coach; Baltimore Ravens (2016–2017) Offensive assistant; Baltimore Ravens (2018–2020) Assistant tight ends coach; Houston Texans (2021) Tight ends coach; New York Giants (2022–2023) Tight ends coach; Los Angeles Chargers (2024–2025) Tight ends coach/run game coordinator

Awards and highlights
- 2× Grey Cup champion (2009, 2010)

Andy Bischoff (born December 8, 1970) is an American football coach. He has served as an assistant coach in the National Football League (NFL) with the Baltimore Ravens, Chicago Bears, Houston Texans, New York Giants, and Los Angeles Chargers. He also won two Grey Cups with the Montreal Alouettes of the Canadian Football League (CFL).

== Coaching career ==
After college, Bischoff opted to take a job as a teacher and high school football coach over enrolling in a minor league baseball umpire school, working at Cretin-Derham Hall High School in Minnesota. Beginning as the offensive line coach at Cretin-Derham in 1993, he finished his time at the school as the assistant head coach and offensive coordinator, as well as the dean of students. He left Cretin-Derham to be the running backs coach for the Montreal Alouettes of the CFL in 2008, where he won two Grey Cups.

=== Chicago Bears ===
He followed Alouettes head coach Marc Trestman in 2013, serving as his tight ends coach for the Chicago Bears, and was not retained after Trestman's firing following the 2014 season.

=== Baltimore Ravens ===
Bischoff was hired as an offensive assistant by the Baltimore Ravens in 2015. He was promoted to assistant tight ends coach in 2018.

=== Houston Texans ===
Bischoff went with David Culley to the Houston Texans in 2021 and was named the team’s tight ends coach.

=== New York Giants ===
On February 6, 2022, Bischoff was hired as the tight ends coach for the New York Giants.

=== Los Angeles Chargers ===
On February 14, 2024, Bischoff was named as the tight ends coach and run game coordinator for the Los Angeles Chargers. On February 13, 2026, Bischoff and the Chargers parted ways.
