= Garret Wallow =

American football player (born 1999)

No. 49 – San Francisco 49ers
- Position: Linebacker
- Roster status: Active

Personal information
- Born: January 25, 1999 (age 27); New Orleans, Louisiana, U.S.
- Listed height: 6 ft 2 in (1.88 m)
- Listed weight: 230 lb (104 kg)

Career information
- High school: John Curtis Christian (River Ridge, Louisiana)
- College: TCU (2017–2020)
- NFL draft: 2021: 5th round, 170th overall pick

Career history
- Houston Texans (2021–2023); Tennessee Titans (2023–2024); Denver Broncos (2025); San Francisco 49ers (2025–present)

Awards and highlights
- First-team All-Big 12 (2020)

Career NFL statistics as of 2025
- Total tackles: 51
- Sacks: 1
- Pass deflections: 1
- Stats at Pro Football Reference

Garret Wallow (born January 25, 1999) is an American professional football linebacker for the San Francisco 49ers of the National Football League (NFL). He played college football for the TCU Horned Frogs and was selected by the Houston Texans in the fifth round of the 2021 NFL draft. Wallow has also played for the Tennessee Titans and Denver Broncos.

== Professional career ==
Pre-draft measurables
Height	Weight	Arm length	Hand span	Wingspan	40-yard dash	10-yard split	20-yard split	20-yard shuttle	Three-cone drill	Vertical jump	Broad jump	Bench press
6 ft 1 5/8 in (1.87 m)	220 lb (100 kg)	30 7/8 in (0.78 m)	9 1/2 in (0.24 m)	6 ft 2 3/8 in (1.89 m)	4.64 s	1.64 s	2.68 s	4.12 s	6.87 s	32.5 in (0.83 m)	10 ft 2 in (3.10 m)	22 reps
All values from Pro Day

=== Houston Texans ===
Wallow was selected by the Houston Texans in the fifth round (170th overall) of the 2021 NFL draft. On May 15, 2021, Wallow signed his four-year rookie contract.

On August 29, 2023, Wallow was waived by the Texans and re-signed to the practice squad. He was signed to the active roster on November 18. He was waived on November 25 and re-signed to the practice squad four days later.

During his tenure with the Texans, Wallow appeared in 32 games (five starts), recording 36 tackles and a sack.

=== Tennessee Titans ===
On December 20, 2023, the Tennessee Titans signed Wallow to their active roster off of Houston's practice squad. He played three games for the Titans during the 2023 season.

During the 2024 preseason, Wallow sustained a pectoral injury. He was placed on injured reserve on August 20, 2024, prematurely ending his season.

=== Denver Broncos ===
On August 1, 2025, Wallow was signed by the Denver Broncos following several injuries to players during training camp. On August 26, Wallow was released by the Broncos. He was re-signed to the practice squad the next day. On October 4, Wallow was promoted to the active roster. Ten days later, Wallow was placed on injured reserve with a hamstring injury. He was activated on November 15. On December 6, Wallow was waived by the Broncos.

=== San Francisco 49ers ===
On December 8, 2025, Wallow was claimed off waivers by the San Francisco 49ers.

On March 18, 2026, Wallow re-signed with the 49ers on a one-year contract.

== NFL career statistics ==
Legend
**Bold**	Career high

=== Regular season ===
Year	Team	Games		Tackles					Interceptions						Fumbles				
Year	Team	GP	GS	Cmb	Solo	Ast	Sck	TFL	Int	Yds	Avg	Lng	TD	PD	FF	Fum	FR	Yds	TD
2021	HOU	**17**	2	**23**	**15**	**8**	**1.0**	**2**	0	0	0.0	0	0	0	0	0	0	0	0
2022	HOU	13	**3**	13	6	7	0.0	1	0	0	0.0	0	0	**1**	0	0	0	0	0
2023	HOU	2	0	0	0	0	0.0	0	0	0	0.0	0	0	0	0	0	0	0	0
2023	TEN	3	0	6	5	1	0.0	0	0	0	0.0	0	0	0	0	0	0	0	0
2024	Did not play due to injury																		
2025	DEN	7	0	5	0	5	0.0	0	0	0	0.0	0	0	0	0	0	0	0	0
2025	SF	4	0	4	2	2	0.0	0	0	0	0.0	0	0	0	0	0	0	0	0
Career		46	5	51	28	23	1.0	3	0	0	0.0	0	0	1	0	0	0	0	0

=== Postseason ===
Year	Team	Games		Tackles					Interceptions						Fumbles				
Year	Team	GP	GS	Cmb	Solo	Ast	Sck	TFL	Int	Yds	Avg	Lng	TD	PD	FF	Fum	FR	Yds	TD
2025	SF	2	2	12	5	7	0.0	0	0	0	0.0	0	0	1	0	0	0	0	0
Career		2	2	12	5	7	0.0	0	0	0	0.0	0	0	1	0	0	0	0	0
