= Davis Mills =

American football player (born 1998)

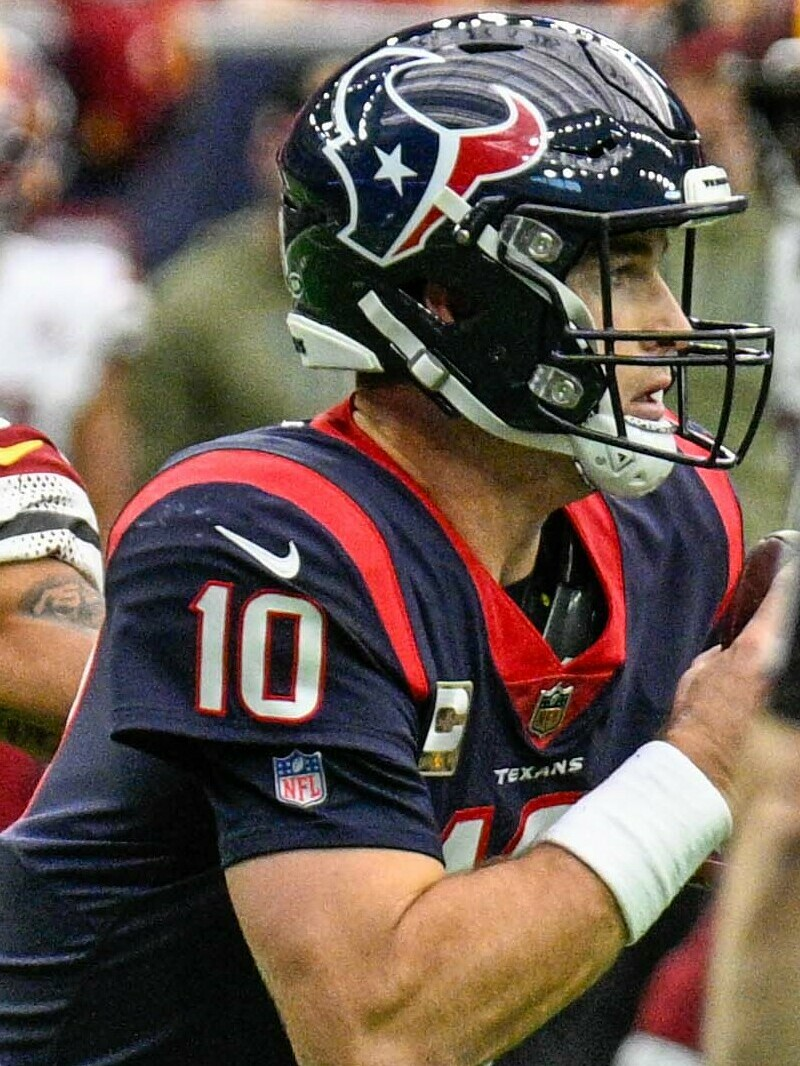
- Mills with the Houston Texans in 2022

No. 10 – Houston Texans
- Position: Quarterback
- Roster status: Active

Personal information
- Born: October 21, 1998 (age 28); Atlanta, Georgia, U.S.
- Listed height: 6 ft 4 in (1.93 m)
- Listed weight: 225 lb (102 kg)

Career information
- High school: Greater Atlanta Christian (Norcross, Georgia)
- College: Stanford (2017–2020)
- NFL draft: 2021: 3rd round, 67th overall pick

Career history
- Houston Texans (2021–present)

Career NFL statistics as of Week 9, 2026
- Passing attempts: 1,109
- Passing completions: 685
- Completion percentage: 61.8%
- TD–INT: 40–26
- Passing yards: 7,089
- Passer rating: 82.4
- Stats at Pro Football Reference

Davis Compton Mills (born October 21, 1998) is an American professional football quarterback for the Houston Texans of the National Football League (NFL). He played college football for the Stanford Cardinal and was selected by the Texans in the third round of the 2021 NFL draft. Mills was Houston's starter during his first two seasons, before taking on a backup role after the Texans selected C. J. Stroud.

== Early life ==
Mills was born on October 21, 1998, in Atlanta, Georgia, later attending Greater Atlanta Christian School in Norcross, Georgia. During his career, Mills threw for 6,290 yards and 66 touchdowns. He was selected to the 2017 U.S. Army All-American Bowl, but was unable to play due to an injury. A five-star recruit, Mills was ranked as the top quarterback in his class. He committed to Stanford University to play college football.

== College career ==
Mills redshirted his freshman year for the Stanford Cardinal in 2017. In 2018, Mills appeared in one game as a backup to K. J. Costello.

Mills entered 2019 as a backup to Costello, but started six of eight games after Costello was injured. Against Washington State, Mills set a school record with 504 passing yards. He finished the 2019 season completing 158 of 241 passes for 1,960 yards, 11 touchdowns, and five interceptions.

Mills played in five games during Stanford's pandemic-shortened 2020 season, completing 129-of-195 passes for 1,508 yards, seven touchdowns, and three interceptions. Mills graduated with a degree in Science, Technology, and Society in 2020.

== Professional career ==
Pre-draft measurables
Height	Weight	Arm length	Hand span	Wingspan	40-yard dash	10-yard split	20-yard split	20-yard shuttle	Three-cone drill	Vertical jump	Broad jump
6 ft 3 3/4 in (1.92 m)	217 lb (98 kg)	31 3/8 in (0.80 m)	9 1/2 in (0.24 m)	6 ft 5 3/4 in (1.97 m)	4.82 s	1.74 s	2.80 s	4.40 s	6.95 s	32.0 in (0.81 m)	9 ft 2 in (2.79 m)
All values from Pro Day

=== 2021 ===
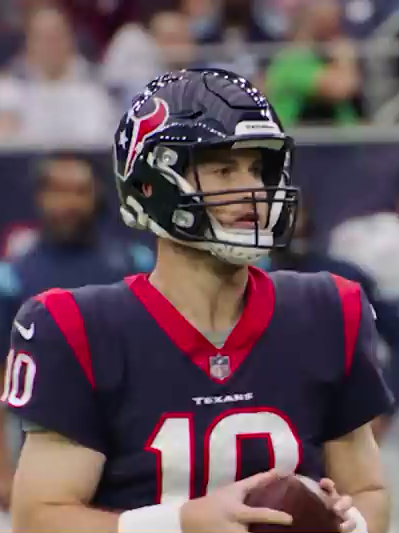
Mills in 2021

Mills was selected by the Houston Texans in the third round (67th overall) of the 2021 NFL draft. He signed his four-year rookie contract, worth $5.2 million, with the Texans on May 26, 2021.

Due to incumbent starting quarterback Deshaun Watson being ruled inactive, Mills was named the second option behind Tyrod Taylor. Mills made his NFL debut during Week 2 against the Cleveland Browns after Taylor was injured, throwing for 102 yards, a touchdown, and an interception in the 31–21 road loss. Mills made his starting debut against the Carolina Panthers in the next game, passing for 168 yards and a touchdown in a 24–9 loss. The following week, Mills struggled against the Buffalo Bills, completing 11 of 21 passes for 87 yards and four interceptions in a 40–0 shutout road loss. Mills rebounded in Week 5 against the New England Patriots when he completed 21-of-29 passes for 312 yards and three touchdowns during the 25–22 loss.

Mills resumed his backup duties after Taylor returned in Week 9, but the latter's ineffective performances led to Mills replacing him in the fourth quarter during a Week 13 31–0 shutout loss to the Indianapolis Colts. Following the game, Mills was announced as the starter for the remainder of the season. He made his first career win in Week 15 against the Jacksonville Jaguars, completing 19-of-30 passes for 209 yards, two touchdowns, and an interception during the 30–16 victory. The following week, Mills led the Texans to a 41–29 upset over the Los Angeles Chargers, completing 21-of-27 passes for 254 yards and two touchdowns.

For his rookie season, in 13 games and 11 starts, Mills set the franchise record for rookie passing yards at 2,664, passing David Carr's record of 2,592 yards (2002). This record would be passed yet again in 2023 by C. J. Stroud with 4,108 passing yards. Mills' 16 passing touchdowns and 66.8 completion percentage were the second-highest among rookie quarterbacks for the season, behind Mac Jones (22 passing touchdowns and 67.6 completion percentage). Mills' completion percentage total also set the Texans rookie record.

=== 2022 ===
With Watson traded to the Browns and the departure of Taylor, Mills was named the Texans' starter for the 2022 season. In Week 1 against the Colts, he completed 23 of 37 passes for 240 yards and two touchdowns in the 20–20 tie.

Following a Week 11 loss of 10–23 to the Washington Commanders in a five-game losing stretch, Mills was benched in favor of Kyle Allen for the Texans' Week 12 matchup against the Miami Dolphins. After Allen and the Texans lost the next two games, Mills was made starter again. During the season finale against the Colts, as Houston was down 24–31 with 58 seconds left in the game at 4th-and-20 on Indianapolis' 28 yard line, Mills threw a completed pass to Jordan Akins for a touchdown. With a subsequent two-point attempt tacked on by Mills and Akins, the Texans led 32–31 with 50 seconds left as the Colts got the ball back. With the help of Tremon Smith, the Texans won on the road. Hours later, head coach Lovie Smith was fired as the victory cost Houston the first overall pick in the 2023 NFL draft, the pick instead going to Smith's former team, the Chicago Bears.

Mills finished his second professional season with 3,118 passing yards, 17 touchdowns, and a league-leading 15 interceptions to go along with 32 carries for 108 yards and two touchdowns in 15 games and starts.

=== 2023 ===
After the Texans selected C. J. Stroud in the first round of the 2023 NFL draft, Mills was named the Texans' backup after a preseason competition with Stroud while Case Keenum was named third-string after being signed to the team in the offseason.

After Stroud was ruled out with a concussion he sustained in Week 14, Keenum was named the starter, but was benched after the start of the fourth quarter as Houston was behind 36–7. Mills was able to generate some momentum, scoring in two of the next four drives and cutting the Browns' lead to 36–22.

Mills finished the 2023 season with 173 passing yards and two touchdowns in six games and no starts.

=== 2024 ===
On September 4, Mills signed a one-year, $5 million extension with the Texans through 2025.

Mills saw most of his action in the regular season-finale against the Tennessee Titans with the Texans' playoff position secured. After Stroud scored on Houston's first drive of the game, Mills completed 12-of-22 passes for 128 yards as he guided Houston to a 23–14 road victory.

Mills finished the 2024 season with 212 passing yards in four games and no starts.

=== 2025 ===
On September 2, 2025, Mills agreed to a one-year, $7 million contract extension with the Texans.

Mills was named the starter for the Week 10 matchup against the Jacksonville Jaguars after C. J. Stroud suffered a concussion the previous week. After a 29–10 deficit, Mills led the Texans to a 36–29 comeback victory in the fourth quarter after passing for two touchdowns and rushing for the game-winning touchdown. He finished the game with 292 passing yards, the two aforementioned touchdowns, and an interception to go along with three carries for 20 yards and the aforementioned touchdown. In the next game against the Tennessee Titans, Mills threw for 274 yards and a touchdown during the 16–13 road victory. The following week against the Buffalo Bills on Thursday Night Football, he had 153 passing yards and two touchdowns in the 23–19 victory.

== Career statistics ==
=== NFL ===
Legend
	Led the league
**Bold**	Career high

==== Regular season ====
Year	Team	Games			Passing									Rushing					Sacks		Fumbles	
Year	Team	GP	GS	Record	Cmp	Att	Pct	Yds	Y/A	Lng	TD	Int	Rtg	Att	Yds	Avg	Lng	TD	Sck	SckY	Fum	Lost
2021	HOU	13	11	2–9	263	394	**66.8**	2,664	**6.8**	**67**	16	10	**88.8**	18	44	2.4	11	0	**31**	206	5	1
2022	HOU	**15**	**15**	3–10–1	**292**	**479**	61.0	**3,118**	6.5	58	**17**	**15**	78.8	**32**	**108**	3.4	**17**	**2**	**31**	**244**	**8**	**3**
2023	HOU	6	0	—	18	39	46.2	173	4.4	19	2	0	76.1	2	9	4.5	9	0	2	13	0	0
2024	HOU	4	0	—	20	36	55.6	212	6.0	25	0	0	72.9	3	11	3.6	9	0	2	18	0	0
2025	HOU	6	3	**3–0**	91	159	57.2	915	5.8	54	5	1	81.6	13	60	**4.6**	14	1	8	60	1	0
2026	HOU	1	0	–	1	2	50.0	7	3.5	7	0	0	58.3	2	-2	-1.0	-1	0	0	0	0	0
Career		45	29	8–19–1	685	1,109	61.8	7,089	6.4	67	40	26	82.4	70	230	3.3	17	3	74	541	14	4

==== Postseason ====
Year	Team	Games			Passing									Rushing					Sacks		Fumbles	
Year	Team	GP	GS	Record	Cmp	Att	Pct	Yds	Y/A	Lng	TD	Int	Rtg	Att	Yds	Avg	Lng	TD	Sck	SckY	Fum	Lost
2023	HOU	1	0	—	1	1	100.0	6	6.0	6	0	0	91.7	3	−4	−1.3	−1	0	0	0	0	0
2024	HOU	0	0	—	DNP																	
2025	HOU	0	0	—	DNP																	
Career		1	0	—	1	1	100.0	6	6.0	6	0	0	91.7	3	−4	−1.3	−1	0	0	0	0	0

=== College ===
Season	Team	Games			Passing								Rushing			
Season	Team	GP	GS	Record	Comp	Att	Pct	Yards	Avg	TD	Int	Rate	Att	Yards	Avg	TD
2017	Stanford	0	0	—	Redshirt											
2018	Stanford	1	0	—	0	2	0.0	0	0.0	0	0	0.0	1	5	5.0	0
2019	Stanford	**8**	**6**	2−4	**158**	**241**	65.6	**1,960**	**8.1**	**11**	**5**	**144.8**	**32**	**44**	**1.4**	0
2020	Stanford	5	5	**4−1**	129	195	**66.2**	1,508	7.7	7	3	139.9	30	37	1.2	**3**
Career		14	11	6−5	287	438	65.5	3,468	7.9	18	8	141.9	63	86	1.4	3

== Personal life ==
Mills married Tori Wisted on February 17, 2024. The couple met in high school and got engaged in 2023. On January 5, 2026, their first child, a son named Maximus, was born.
