= Roy Lopez (American football) =

American football player (born 1997)

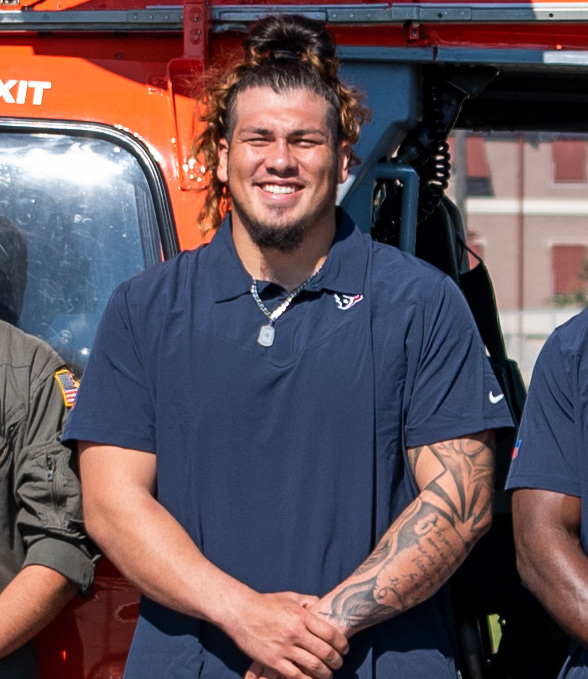
- Lopez in 2021

No. 51 – Arizona Cardinals
- Position: Nose tackle
- Roster status: Active

Personal information
- Born: August 7, 1997 (age 29); Tempe, Arizona, U.S.
- Listed height: 6 ft 2 in (1.88 m)
- Listed weight: 312 lb (142 kg)

Career information
- High school: Mesquite (Gilbert, Arizona)
- College: New Mexico State (2016–2019); Arizona (2020)
- NFL draft: 2021: 6th round, 195th overall pick

Career history
- Houston Texans (2021–2022); Arizona Cardinals (2023–2024); Detroit Lions (2025); Arizona Cardinals (2026–present)

Career NFL statistics as of Week 5, 2026
- Total tackles: 187
- Sacks: 6
- Forced fumbles: 1
- Fumble recoveries: 2
- Pass deflections: 5
- Stats at Pro Football Reference

Roy Jacob Lopez (born August 7, 1997) is an American professional football nose tackle for the Arizona Cardinals of the National Football League (NFL). He played college football for the New Mexico State Aggies before transferring to the Arizona Wildcats. He was selected by the Houston Texans in the sixth round of the 2021 NFL draft.

== College career ==
Lopez was ranked as a two–star recruit by 247Sports.com coming out of high school. He committed to New Mexico State on August 23, 2016. Lopez injured his leg in the first week of the 2019 season and returned only briefly at the end of the season. He was granted a fifth year of eligibility and transferred to Arizona on July 19, 2020.

== Professional career ==
Pre-draft measurables
Height	Weight	Arm length	Hand span	Wingspan	40-yard dash	10-yard split	20-yard split	20-yard shuttle	Three-cone drill	Vertical jump	Broad jump	Bench press
6 ft 1 5/8 in (1.87 m)	304 lb (138 kg)	32 in (0.81 m)	9 7/8 in (0.25 m)	6 ft 4 in (1.93 m)	5.16 s	1.81 s	2.96 s	4.51 s	7.39 s	31.0 in (0.79 m)	8 ft 9 in (2.67 m)	36 reps
All values from Pro Day

=== Houston Texans ===
Lopez was drafted by the Houston Texans in the sixth round with the 195th pick of the 2021 NFL draft on May 1, 2021. On May 12, 2021, Lopez officially signed with the Texans. During a November 7, 2021, game against the Miami Dolphins, he sacked quarterback Jacoby Brissett and later recovered a fumble forced by teammate Kamu Grugier-Hill. They were the first sack and first takeaway of his professional career.

On August 29, 2023, Lopez was waived/injured by the Texans.

=== Arizona Cardinals ===
On September 23, 2023, Lopez was signed to the practice squad of the Arizona Cardinals, and promoted to the active roster three days later.

=== Detroit Lions ===
On March 11, 2025, Lopez signed a one-year, $4.65 million contract with the Detroit Lions.

=== Arizona Cardinals (second stint) ===
On March 11, 2026, Lopez signed a two-year, $11.5 million contract with the Arizona Cardinals.

== Personal life ==
Lopez is of Mexican-American descent. His mother and several other members of his family are police officers.
