= David Culley =

American football coach (born 1955)

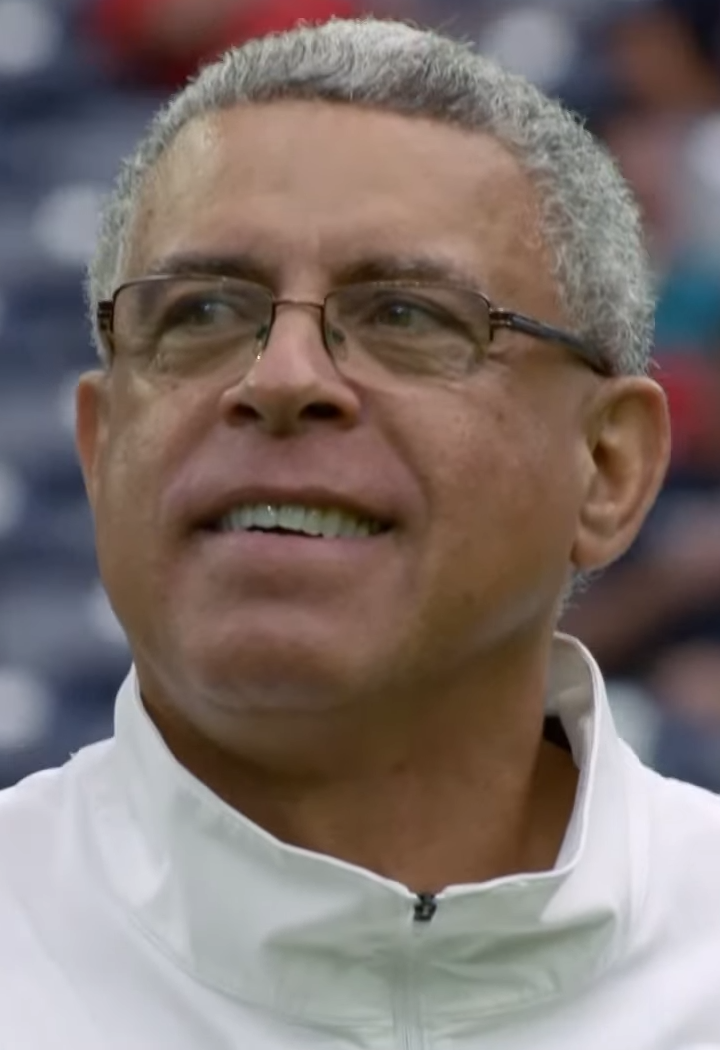
- Culley with the Houston Texans in 2021

Personal information
- Born: September 17, 1955 (age 71); Sparta, Tennessee, U.S.

Career information
- High school: White County (Sparta, Tennessee)
- College: Vanderbilt

Career history
- Austin Peay (1978) Running backs coach; Vanderbilt (1979–1981) Wide receivers coach; Middle Tennessee State (1982) Quarterbacks coach & running backs coach; Chattanooga (1983) Wide receivers coach; Southwestern Louisiana (1985–1988) Quarterbacks coach; UTEP (1989–1990) Offensive coordinator, running backs coach & wide receivers coach; Texas A&M (1991–1993) Wide receivers coach; Tampa Bay Buccaneers (1994–1995) Wide receivers coach; Pittsburgh Steelers (1996–1998) Wide receivers coach; Philadelphia Eagles (1999–2010) Wide receivers coach; Philadelphia Eagles (2011–2012) Senior offensive assistant & wide receivers coach; Kansas City Chiefs (2013–2016) Assistant head coach & wide receivers coach; Buffalo Bills (2017–2018) Quarterbacks coach; Baltimore Ravens (2019–2020) Assistant head coach, wide receivers coach & passing game coordinator; Houston Texans (2021) Head coach

Head coaching record
- Regular season: 4–13 (.235)
- Coaching profile at Pro Football Reference

David Wayne Culley (born September 17, 1955) is an American football coach. He was the head coach for the Houston Texans of the National Football League (NFL) in 2021.

Culley has 45 years of coaching experience in both collegiate and professional levels, including 27 years of NFL assistant coaching experience. He previously worked under Andy Reid with the Philadelphia Eagles, with whom he appeared in Super Bowl XXXIX, and the Kansas City Chiefs from 1999 to 2016. Culley assumed his first head coaching position with the Houston Texans in 2021; however, he was fired after only one season, finishing with a 4–13 record.

== Early life ==
Culley was born and raised in Sparta, Tennessee. He attended White County High School, where he played point guard in basketball, pitcher in baseball and quarterback in football. Culley played quarterback at Vanderbilt, where he was the first African-American to play the position in school history.

== Coaching career ==
=== Early career ===
Culley began his coaching career as a running backs coach at Austin Peay State University in 1978. In 1979, Culley joined Vanderbilt University, his alma mater, as their wide receivers coach. Culley then joined as the quarterbacks and running backs coach at Middle Tennessee State University in 1982. In 1983, Culley was hired by the University of Tennessee at Chattanooga as their wide receivers coach. Culley then served as the quarterbacks coach at the University of Louisiana at Lafayette in 1985. In 1989, Culley was hired by the University of Texas at El Paso (UTEP) as their offensive coordinator, running backs coach and wide receivers coach. In 1991, Culley then served as the wide receivers coach at Texas A&M University.

=== Tampa Bay Buccaneers ===
In 1994, Culley was hired by the Tampa Bay Buccaneers as their wide receivers coach under head coach Sam Wyche.

=== Pittsburgh Steelers ===
In 1996, a season after the Steelers lost Super Bowl XXX to the Dallas Cowboys, Culley was hired by the Pittsburgh Steelers as their wide receivers coach under head coach Bill Cowher.

=== Philadelphia Eagles ===
In 1999, Culley was hired by the Philadelphia Eagles as their wide receivers coach under new head coach Andy Reid. The Eagles made it to one Super Bowl during Culley's tenure; in 2005 and in 5 NFC Championship Games; 4 straight from the 2001 to 2004 seasons and in 2008. In 2011, Culley gained an additional role as a senior offensive assistant. Culley served in the Eagles coaching staff from 1999–2012, also Andy Reid's time as head coach of the team.

=== Kansas City Chiefs ===
In 2013, Culley was hired by the Kansas City Chiefs as the assistant head coach/wide receivers coach, reuniting Culley with new head coach Andy Reid, who was fired by the Philadelphia Eagles the season prior.

=== Buffalo Bills ===
In 2017, Culley was hired by the Buffalo Bills as their quarterbacks coach under new head coach Sean McDermott. Culley and McDermott both served as assistant coaches for the Philadelphia Eagles under then-head coach Andy Reid from 1999 to 2010. In Culley's first year with Buffalo, he coached quarterbacks Tyrod Taylor and rookie Nathan Peterman and the team would make the playoffs for the first time since 1999, which was previously the longest playoff drought in the 4 major North American sports leagues. In his 2nd year, Culley coached rookie and future Pro Bowl quarterback Josh Allen, the 7th pick in the 2018 draft.

=== Baltimore Ravens ===
In 2019, Culley was hired by the Baltimore Ravens as their assistant head coach, wide receivers coach and passing coordinator under head coach John Harbaugh. Culley and Harbaugh both served as assistant coaches for the Philadelphia Eagles under then-head coach Andy Reid from 1999 to 2007. He missed the team's week 15 game in 2020 against the Jacksonville Jaguars due to an illness.

=== Houston Texans ===
On January 29, 2021, Culley was hired to become the head coach of the Houston Texans. Culley became the Texans' fourth head coach in franchise history.

On September 12, 2021, Culley made his regular-season head coaching debut against the Jacksonville Jaguars and led the Texans to a 37–21 victory, marking Culley’s first victory as a head coach. The Texans would win three more games during the 2021 season, finishing with a 4–13 record and matching their win total from the previous season. Culley was fired by the Texans on January 13, 2022, with general manager Nick Caserio citing "philosophical differences over the long-term direction and vision for our program moving forward." He was replaced by Lovie Smith.

== Head coaching record ==
Team	Year	Regular season					Postseason			
Team	Year	Won	Lost	Ties	Win %	Finish	Won	Lost	Win %	Result
HOU	2021	4	13	0	.235	3rd in AFC South	—	—	—	—
Total		4	13	0	.235		0	0	.000	
