= Tavierre Thomas =

American football player (born 1996)

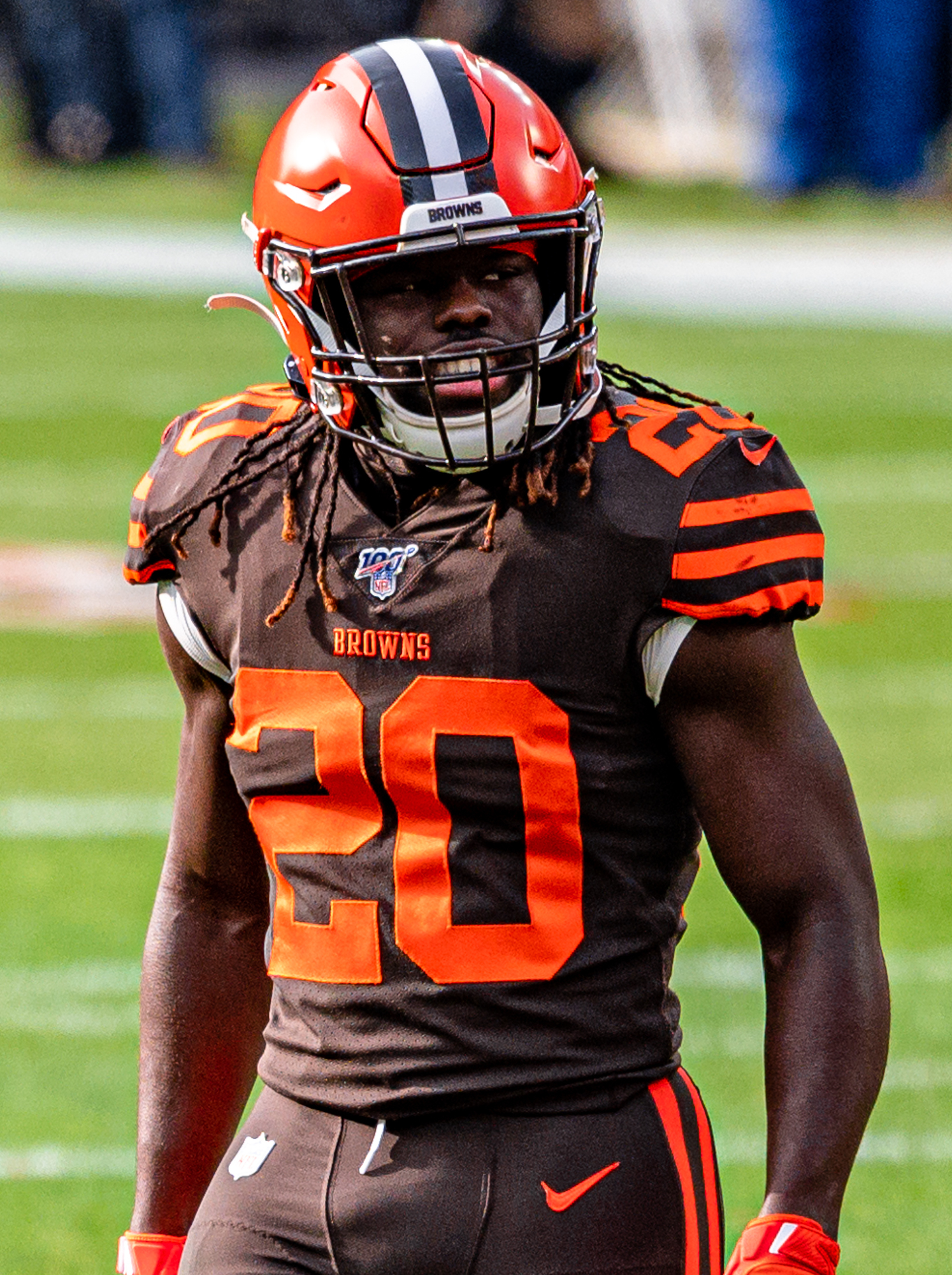
- Thomas with the Cleveland Browns in 2019

No. 37 – New York Giants
- Positions: Safety, special teamer
- Roster status: Active

Personal information
- Born: March 11, 1996 (age 30); Detroit, Michigan, U.S.
- Listed height: 5 ft 10 in (1.78 m)
- Listed weight: 212 lb (96 kg)

Career information
- High school: Allen Academy (Detroit)
- College: Ferris State (2014–2017)
- NFL draft: 2018: undrafted

Career history
- Arizona Cardinals (2018)*; Cleveland Browns (2018–2020); Houston Texans (2021–2023); Tampa Bay Buccaneers (2024); Minnesota Vikings (2025–2026); New York Giants (2026–present)
- * Offseason or practice squad member only

Awards and highlights
- 2× First-team D-II All-American (2016, 2017); 2x First-team All-GLIAC (2016, 2017)

Career NFL statistics as of Week 9, 2026
- Total tackles: 262
- Interceptions: 2
- Pass deflections: 6
- Forced fumbles: 7
- Fumble recoveries: 2
- Sacks: 1.0
- Defensive touchdowns: 1
- Stats at Pro Football Reference

Tavierre Thomas (born March 11, 1996) is an American professional football safety and special teamer for the New York Giants of the National Football League (NFL). He played college football for the Ferris State Bulldogs.

== Early life ==
Thomas was born and grew up in Detroit, Michigan and attended Detroit Allen Academy. As a senior, Thomas received recruiting interest from Iowa, Central Michigan and Eastern Michigan but was not offered a scholarship by any Division I program due to a low ACT score despite graduating high school with a 3.8 grade point average. Thomas ultimately decided to enroll at Ferris State University on an academic scholarship.

== College career ==
Thomas played four seasons with the Ferris State Bulldogs, initially joining the team as a walk-on. Although he initially intended to redshirt his freshman season and then transfer to a Division I program after meeting academic standards, Thomas eventually opted to play the final five games of the season after an injury to one of the team's starting defensive backs. Thomas was named one of the Bulldogs' starting cornerbacks going into his sophomore year and recorded 48 tackles with three interceptions, including one returned for a touchdown. In his junior season, he intercepted a career-high six passes with 15 passes defensed in 15 starts was named first-team All-Great Lakes Intercollegiate Athletic Conference (GLIAC) and first-team Division II All-America, as well as third-team Little All-America by the Associated Press. As a senior, Thomas was again named first-team all-GLIAC and Division II All-America as well as the GLIAC Defensive Back of the Year after recording 60 tackles, four interceptions and had a career-high 18 passes defensed. Thomas finished his collegiate career with 175 total tackles, 14 interceptions and 35 passes defensed.

== Professional career ==
Pre-draft measurables
Height	Weight	Arm length	Hand span	Wingspan	40-yard dash	10-yard split	20-yard split	20-yard shuttle	Three-cone drill	Vertical jump	Broad jump	Bench press
5 ft 10 in (1.78 m)	202 lb (92 kg)	30 1/2 in (0.77 m)	9 3/8 in (0.24 m)	6 ft 1 3/4 in (1.87 m)	4.38 s	1.55 s	2.60 s	4.38 s	7.09 s	33 1/2 in (0.85 m)	10 ft 0 in (3.05 m)	13 reps
All values from Pro Day

=== Arizona Cardinals ===
Thomas was signed by the Arizona Cardinals as an undrafted free agent on April 30, 2018, and waived by the team on September 1.

=== Cleveland Browns ===
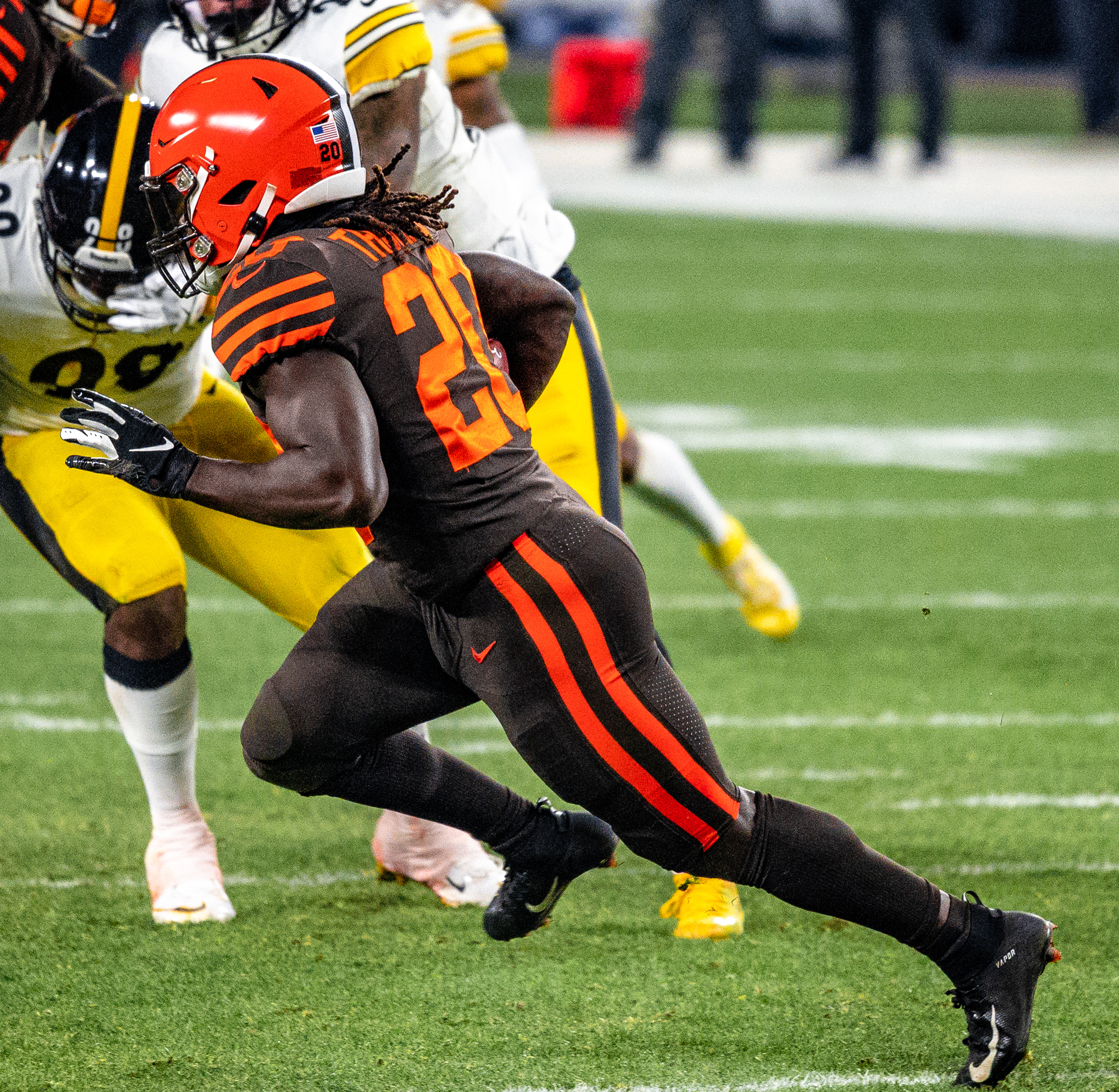
Thomas playing against the Pittsburgh Steelers in 2019.

On September 2, 2018, Thomas was claimed off waivers by the Cleveland Browns. Thomas made his NFL debut on September 9, 2018, during the Browns season opener against the Pittsburgh Steelers. During the Browns' Week 7 loss to the Tampa Bay Buccaneers, Thomas downed a punt by Britton Colquitt inside the Buccaneers one-yard line, setting up a safety by Browns defensive tackle Trevon Coley. As a rookie Thomas played in 13 games, mostly on special teams, and tied for the team lead with seven special teams tackles (eight overall). Thomas played in all 16 of the Browns' games in 2019 with nine tackles and a fumble recovery and also returned ten kickoffs for 204 yards. He blocked a field goal attempt against the San Francisco 49ers on October 7, 2019.

In Week 1 of the 2020 season against the Baltimore Ravens, Thomas recorded his first career sack on Lamar Jackson during the 38–6 loss.

=== Houston Texans ===
Thomas signed a two-year contract with the Houston Texans on March 22, 2021. He entered the 2021 season fourth on the Texans cornerback depth chart. In Week 16, Thomas had eight tackles, a pass deflection, and a game-sealing 48-yard pick-six in a 41-29 upset win over the Chargers, earning American Football Conference Defensive Player of the Week.

On September 1, 2022, Thomas was placed on injured reserve. He was activated on November 3.

Thomas re-signed with the Texans on March 17, 2023.

=== Tampa Bay Buccaneers ===
On March 18, 2024, Thomas signed with the Tampa Bay Buccaneers.

=== Minnesota Vikings ===
On March 12, 2025, Thomas signed a one-year contract with the Minnesota Vikings.

On March 11, 2026, Thomas re-signed with the Vikings on a two-year contract. On August 30, he was released by the Vikings as a part of their final roster cuts. Thomas was re–signed to the Vikings' practice squad the next day.

=== New York Giants ===
On November 16, 2026, Thomas was signed by the New York Giants off the Vikings practice squad.
