= Nick Caserio =

American football executive (born 1975)

Houston Texans
- Title: General manager, Executive vice president

Personal information
- Born: December 27, 1975 (age 50); Lyndhurst, Ohio, U.S.

Career information
- Position: Quarterback
- High school: University School
- College: John Carroll (1995–1998)

Career history

Coaching
- Saginaw Valley State (1999–2000) Graduate assistant; Central Michigan Chippewas (2001) Graduate assistant; New England Patriots (2002) Offensive coaching assistant; New England Patriots (2007) Wide receivers coach

Operations
- New England Patriots (2001) Personnel assistant; New England Patriots (2003–2006); Scout (2003); Director of pro personnel (2004–2006); New England Patriots (2008–2020) Director of player personnel; Houston Texans (2021–present); General manager (2021–2022); Executive vice president and general manager (2023–present)

Awards and highlights
- 6× Super Bowl champion (XXXVI, XXXVIII, XXXIX, XLIX, LI, LIII)
- Executive profile at Pro Football Reference

Nicholas Caserio (born December 27, 1975) is an American professional football executive who is the executive vice president and general manager of the Houston Texans of the National Football League (NFL). Caserio began his NFL career as a coaching assistant with the New England Patriots before working as a scout and executive for them throughout the 2000s and 2010s.

== Playing career ==
Caserio played his high school football at University School in Hunting Valley, Ohio from 1992 to 1994. Caserio then attended John Carroll University, where he played football as a quarterback from 1995 to 1998. A three-time academic All-Ohio Athletic Conference selection, he was also a teammate of former Las Vegas Raiders head coach and then-John Carroll wide receiver Josh McDaniels and Washington Redskins linebacker London Fletcher.

== Coaching career ==
=== College ===
Caserio began his coaching career as a graduate assistant at Saginaw Valley State University from 1999 to 2000, earning his MBA at the same time. In 2001, he served as a graduate assistant at Central Michigan University before being hired by the Patriots.

=== New England Patriots ===
In 2002, Caserio served as an offensive coaching assistant coach for the Patriots before shifting back to the scouting department in 2003. In 2007, Caserio moved back to coaching as the Patriots' wide receivers coach. While still remaining a part of the personnel department, Caserio assisted the offensive coaching staff during the 2009 preseason, which included new wide receivers coach Chad O'Shea and tight ends coach Shane Waldron. Caserio also continued to assist the coaching staff from the press box during games along with football research director Ernie Adams.

== Executive career ==
=== New England Patriots ===
In 2001, Caserio was hired by the New England Patriots as a personnel assistant. Caserio moved to the scouting department as an area scout in 2003. In 2004, Caserio was promoted to the Patriots' director of pro personnel, a position he served until 2006. In 2008 Caserio returned to the personnel department as the Patriots' director of player personnel. He remained in that position through the 2020 season. During Caserio's tenure with the Patriots, his position as director of player personnel did not give him final say over the roster; that power was held by Patriots head coach Bill Belichick.

=== Houston Texans ===
On January 7, 2021, Caserio was named the general manager of the Houston Texans. He was given the additional title of executive vice president in June 2023.

== Personal life ==
Caserio earned his degree in finance from John Carroll University and later earned his master's of business administration from Saginaw Valley State University. Caserio and his wife, Kathleen, married in June 2009 and have three daughters together.
