= Kamu Grugier-Hill =

American football player (born 1994)

Profile
- Position: Linebacker

Personal information
- Born: May 16, 1994 (age 32); Honolulu, Hawaii, U.S.
- Listed height: 6 ft 2 in (1.88 m)
- Listed weight: 230 lb (104 kg)

Career information
- High school: Kamehameha Schools (Honolulu)
- College: Eastern Illinois (2012–2015)
- NFL draft: 2016: 6th round, 208th overall pick

Career history
- New England Patriots (2016)*; Philadelphia Eagles (2016–2019); Miami Dolphins (2020); Houston Texans (2021–2022); Arizona Cardinals (2022); Carolina Panthers (2023); Minnesota Vikings (2024)
- * Offseason or practice squad member only

Awards and highlights
- Super Bowl champion (LII); First-team All-OVC (2014, 2015)

Career NFL statistics
- Total tackles: 356
- Sacks: 6
- Forced fumbles: 4
- Fumble recoveries: 2
- Interceptions: 5
- Stats at Pro Football Reference

Caelan Kamuela Grugier-Hill (born May 16, 1994) is an American professional football linebacker. He played college football for the Eastern Illinois Panthers, and was selected by the New England Patriots in the sixth round of the 2016 NFL draft.

== Early life ==
Grugier-Hill attended Kamehameha Schools in Honolulu where he played football. Grugier-Hill began playing football in his junior year of high school as a safety and punter.

== College career ==
Grugier-Hill played for the Eastern Illinois Panthers football team from 2012 to 2015. In his freshman year, he made his first start against UT Martin. In both 2014 and 2015, he earned First-team All-Ohio Valley Conference honors. Grugier-Hill reportedly became the first player ejected in the 2014 college football season when he punched a Minnesota lineman in the groin.

== Professional career ==
Pre-draft measurables
| Height | Weight | Arm length | Hand span | 40-yard dash | 10-yard split | 20-yard split | 20-yard shuttle | Three-cone drill | Vertical jump | Broad jump | Bench press |
|---|---|---|---|---|---|---|---|---|---|---|---|
| 6 ft 2 1/8 in (1.88 m) | 208 lb (94 kg) | 30 1/2 in (0.77 m) | 9 1/4 in (0.23 m) | 4.45 s | 1.52 s | 2.53 s | 4.20 s | 6.89 s | 38.5 in (0.98 m) | 10 ft 9 in (3.28 m) | 15 reps |
All values from Northwestern’s Pro Day

=== New England Patriots ===
The New England Patriots selected Grugier-Hill in the sixth round (208th overall) of the 2016 NFL draft. On May 5, 2016, the Patriots signed Grugier-Hill to a four-year, $2.44 million contract that includes a signing bonus of $100,356. On September 3, 2016, he was waived by the Patriots as part of final roster cuts.

=== Philadelphia Eagles ===
On September 4, 2016, the Philadelphia Eagles claimed Grugier-Hill off waivers. He recorded his first career tackle and his only tackle of the 2016 season when he brought down Duke Johnson of the Cleveland Browns for a loss of six yards in Week 1 at Lincoln Financial Field. Because the tackle came on a fake punt, it was technically the only defensive snap which Grugier-Hill played in his rookie year.

On November 19, 2017, Grugier-Hill filled in on kickoffs for kicker Jake Elliott after Elliott suffered a concussion against the Dallas Cowboys. Grugier-Hill did not attempt a field goal or an extra point as the Eagles went for a two-point conversion after every touchdown. The Eagles went on to win the game 37–9. Grugier-Hill won his first Super Bowl ring when the Eagles defeated the Patriots in Super Bowl LII 41–33.

Grugier-Hill recorded his first career interception by picking off a pass from New York Giants quarterback Eli Manning on October 11, 2018.

Grugier-Hill was placed on injured reserve on December 18, 2019, after being diagnosed with a lower lumbar disc herniation.

=== Miami Dolphins ===
On March 21, 2020, Grugier-Hill signed a one-year contract with the Miami Dolphins which reunited him with head coach Brian Flores, who had previously been the linebackers coach for the Patriots.

=== Houston Texans ===
On March 23, 2021, Grugier-Hill signed a one-year contract with the Houston Texans.

On December 5, 2021, in a game against the Indianapolis Colts, Grugier-Hill set the Texans' franchise record for tackles in a single game, with 19 tackles.

On March 24, 2022, Grugier-Hill re-signed with the Texans.

On October 26, 2022, Grugier-Hill asked for and was granted his release from the Texans.

=== Arizona Cardinals ===
On November 2, 2022, Grugier-Hill signed with the Arizona Cardinals.

=== Carolina Panthers ===
On April 4, 2023, Grugier-Hill signed with the Carolina Panthers. He played in 17 games with five starts, recording 56 tackles, one sack, and one interception.

=== Minnesota Vikings ===
On March 20, 2024, Grugier-Hill signed with the Minnesota Vikings.
