= Dalton Schultz =

American football player (born 1996)

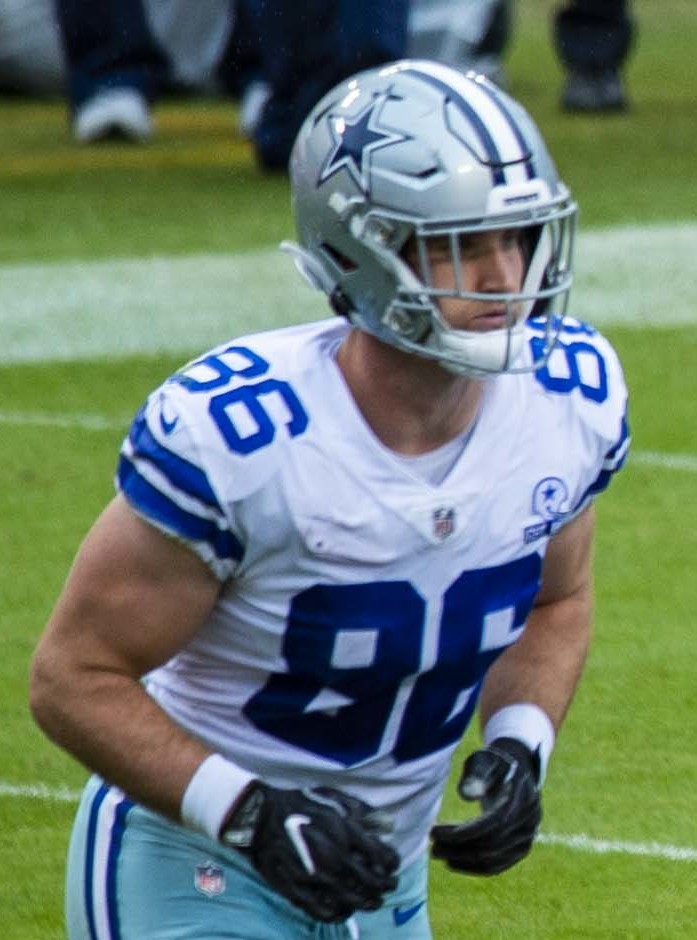
- Schultz with the Dallas Cowboys in 2020

No. 86 – Houston Texans
- Position: Tight end
- Roster status: Active

Personal information
- Born: July 11, 1996 (age 30); Sandy, Utah, U.S.
- Listed height: 6 ft 5 in (1.96 m)
- Listed weight: 242 lb (110 kg)

Career information
- High school: Bingham (South Jordan, Utah)
- College: Stanford (2014–2017)
- NFL draft: 2018: 4th round, 137th overall pick

Career history
- Dallas Cowboys (2018–2022); Houston Texans (2023–present)

Awards and highlights
- First-team All-Pac-12 (2017)

Career NFL statistics as of Week 9, 2026
- Receptions: 440
- Receiving yards: 4,430
- Receiving touchdowns: 27
- Stats at Pro Football Reference

Dalton Chase Schultz (born July 11, 1996) is an American professional football tight end for the Houston Texans of the National Football League (NFL). He played college football for the Stanford Cardinal and was selected by the Dallas Cowboys in the fourth round of the 2018 NFL draft.

== Early life ==
Schultz attended Bingham High School in South Jordan, Utah. Along with football, he played basketball for the Miners athletic teams. As a senior, Schultz caught 31 passes for 512 yards and nine touchdowns.

For his high school career, Schultz had 76 receptions for 1,120 yards and 12 touchdowns. He committed to play college football for the Stanford Cardinal in January 2014.

== College career ==
Schultz accepted a football scholarship from Stanford University. He did not see any action as a true freshman in 2014 and was redshirted.

As a redshirt freshman in 2015, Schultz played in all 14 games as a backup to Austin Hooper, catching 10 passes for 121 yards and a touchdown.

As a sophomore in 2016, Schultz was named the starter after Hooper declared for the NFL draft. He played in all 13 games and recorded 23 receptions for 222 yards (fourth on the team) and a touchdown. Schultz helped block for running backs Christian McCaffrey and Bryce Love, while receiving honorable-mention All-Pac-12 honors.

Prior to the 2017 season, Schultz was named to the John Mackey Award watch list. In 13 games, he was used mostly as a blocker, catching 22 passes for 212 yards (fifth on the team) and three touchdowns, while helping running back Love rush for 2,118 yards.

Schultz was named to the All-Pac-12 First-team, declaring for the 2018 NFL draft after the season.

== Professional career ==
Pre-draft measurables
Height	Weight	Arm length	Hand span	Wingspan	40-yard dash	10-yard split	20-yard split	20-yard shuttle	Three-cone drill	Vertical jump	Broad jump	Bench press
6 ft 5 3/8 in (1.97 m)	244 lb (111 kg)	31 1/4 in (0.79 m)	9 1/2 in (0.24 m)	6 ft 3 3/8 in (1.91 m)	4.75 s	1.62 s	2.76 s	4.40 s	7.00 s	32.0 in (0.81 m)	10 ft 0 in (3.05 m)	20 reps
All values from NFL Combine/Pro Day

=== Dallas Cowboys ===
==== 2018 season ====
Schultz was selected by the Dallas Cowboys in the fourth round (137th overall) of the 2018 NFL Draft, to improve the depth at tight end after the surprising retirements of Jason Witten and James Hanna. He was the third-string tight end behind Geoff Swaim and Blake Jarwin.

After Swaim was lost to an injury in Week 11, Schultz passed Jarwin on the depth chart as the starter and was used mostly for blocking purposes. Schultz started seven of the 11 games he played as well as both playoff contests. Schultz tallied 12 receptions for 116 yards, while contributing to running back Ezekiel Elliott being the NFL rushing champion.

==== 2019 season ====
Although tight end Swaim left via free agency, Witten returned to play professional football after spending one season as a Monday Night Football commentator, keeping Schultz as the team's third-string tight end. Schultz appeared in 16 games, registering one reception for six yards and one kickoff return for five yards in limited play during the season.

==== 2020 season ====
On March 17, 2020, it was announced in the media that Witten would be leaving the Cowboys to sign with the Las Vegas Raiders, opening the door for Schultz to compete for the backup position behind Blake Jarwin. After Jarwin was lost for the year with an ACL injury suffered in the season opener against the Los Angeles Rams, Schultz took over the starting tight end position.

During Week 2 against the Atlanta Falcons, Schultz caught nine passes for 88 yards and his first NFL touchdown reception in the 40–39 comeback victory. He exceeded expectations, becoming the fourth tight end in franchise history to have at least 60 receptions in a regular season with 63, while collecting 615 receiving yards and four touchdowns, even though the Cowboys lost their starting quarterback Dak Prescott in Week 5 against the New York Giants.

==== 2021 season ====
Schultz started 15 out of 17 games, registering career highs in every statistical category with 78 receptions (second on the team), 808 yards (third on the team) and eight touchdowns (tied for team lead). He became the second tight end in franchise history to reach 70 receptions in a single-season and the seventh to have over 100 receptions in his career.

Schultz had six receptions for 80 yards and two touchdowns in Week 3 against the Philadelphia Eagles. In the next game, he recorded six receptions for 58 yards and a touchdown against the Carolina Panthers. The following week, Schultz had six receptions for 79 yards in the fifth game against the Giants.

Schultz made six receptions for 53 yards and one touchdown in the tenth game against the Kansas City Chiefs. He had eight receptions for 67 yards and one touchdown in the fourteenth game against the Giants. He made eight receptions for 82 yards and one touchdown in the fifteenth game against the Washington Football Team. He had 2 touchdowns on three receptions for 21 yards in the season finale against the Eagles.

Schultz led the team in receptions (seven) and receiving yards (89) during the Wild Card 17–23 playoff loss to the San Francisco 49ers.

==== 2022 season ====
The Cowboys decided to place the franchise tag on Schultz before the start of the season. He opted to miss the final week of voluntary organized team activities and was a limited participant in one minicamp practice in hopes of reaching an agreement on a long-term deal, which did not happen.

The expectation was for Schultz to be close to his 2021 level of play and help reduce the blow of Amari Cooper's departure, but he was not able to achieve the same type of production. He posted 63 receptions for 615 yards and 4 touchdowns. One area where Schultz experienced success was as a red zone target, especially toward the end of the season, where he had seven touchdowns in the final nine games and scored 3 times in the two playoff games.

Schultz struggled with a PCL injury he suffered in the fourth quarter of the second game against the Cincinnati Bengals. He reaggravated the injury in the fifth game against the Rams and in the seventh game against the Detroit Lions. The Cowboys also involved rookie tight ends Jake Ferguson and Peyton Hendershot in the offense, which took away some of his potential snaps and opportunities.

Schultz had seven receptions for 62 yards in the season opener against the Tampa Bay Buccaneers. He made six receptions for 74 yards in the eighth game against the Chicago Bears. Schultz had four receptions for 31 yards and two touchdowns in the eleventh game against the Giants. He made seven receptions for 62 yards in the thirteenth game against the Houston Texans. Schultz had seven receptions for 56 yards and two touchdowns in the sixteenth game against the Tennessee Titans.

=== Houston Texans ===
==== 2023 season ====
On March 24, 2023, Schultz signed a one-year contract as a free agent with the Houston Texans. He was used sparingly during the first four weeks of the season as a backup, but eventually became a trusted target for rookie quarterback C. J. Stroud, contributing to him earning the NFL Offensive Rookie of the Year award.

In Week 6 against the New Orleans Saints, Schultz became the third player in franchise history to score a touchdown in three consecutive games. Three weeks later against the Tampa Bay Buccaneers, he had 10 receptions for 130 yards and one touchdown, becoming the second tight end in club history to record at least 8 catches and 100 receiving yards in a single game (Owen Daniels was the first). Schultz was declared inactive in Weeks 13 and 14 with a hamstring injury, while being replaced with Brevin Jordan.

Schultz finished the season with 59 receptions (second in franchise history for a tight end) for 635 yards and five touchdowns in 15 games and eight starts.

==== 2024 season ====
On March 8, 2024, Schultz signed a three-year, $36 million contract extension with the Texans. His production suffered a decline compared to the previous season, with his receiving yards, touchdowns, and average yards per catch decreasing despite playing in two more games. He appeared in 17 games with 13 starts, while collecting 53 receptions for 532 yards and two touchdowns.

==== 2025–present ====
Schultz made 17 appearances (including six starts) for the Texans during the 2025 campaign, recording 82 receptions for 777 yards and three touchdowns.

On March 10, 2026, Schultz agreed to a one-year, $12.6 million contract extension with Houston.

== Career statistics ==
=== NFL ===
==== Regular season ====
Year	Team	Games		Receiving				
Year	Team	GP	GS	Rec	Yds	Avg	Lng	TD
2018	DAL	11	7	12	116	9.7	17	0
2019	DAL	16	0	1	6	6.0	6	0
2020	DAL	16	14	63	615	9.8	28	4
2021	DAL	17	15	78	808	10.4	32	8
2022	DAL	15	15	57	577	10.1	30	5
2023	HOU	15	8	59	635	10.8	31	5
2024	HOU	17	13	53	532	10.0	32	2
2025	HOU	17	6	82	777	9.5	47	3
Career		124	78	405	4,066	10.0	47	27

==== Postseason ====
Year	Team	Games		Receiving				
Year	Team	GP	GS	Rec	Yds	Avg	Lng	TD
2018	DAL	2	2	1	20	20.0	20	0
2021	DAL	1	1	7	89	12.7	38	0
2022	DAL	2	2	12	122	10.2	26	3
2023	HOU	2	0	6	80	13.3	37	1
2024	HOU	2	1	6	86	14.3	34	0
2025	HOU	2	1	5	59	11.8	42	0
Career		11	7	37	456	12.3	42	4

=== College ===
Season	Team	GP	Receiving			
Season	Team	GP	Rec	Yds	Avg	TD
2014	Stanford	Redshirt				
2015	Stanford	10	10	121	12.1	1
2016	Stanford	12	23	222	9.7	1
2017	Stanford	11	22	212	9.6	3
Total		33	55	555	10.1	5

== Personal life ==
Schultz and his wife, Laurel Heinrich, have a son and a daughter.
