= Blake Cashman =

American football player (born 1996)

No. 51 – Minnesota Vikings
- Position: Linebacker
- Roster status: Active

Personal information
- Born: May 10, 1996 (age 30); Eden Prairie, Minnesota, U.S.
- Listed height: 6 ft 1 in (1.85 m)
- Listed weight: 235 lb (107 kg)

Career information
- High school: Eden Prairie
- College: Minnesota (2015–2018)
- NFL draft: 2019: 5th round, 157th overall pick

Career history
- New York Jets (2019–2021); Houston Texans (2022–2023); Minnesota Vikings (2024–present)

Awards and highlights
- Second-team All-Big Ten (2018)

Career NFL statistics as of Week 10, 2026
- Total tackles: 513
- Sacks: 16.5
- Pass deflections: 25
- Interceptions: 1
- Forced fumbles: 1
- Fumble recoveries: 5
- Stats at Pro Football Reference

Blake Cashman (born May 10, 1996) is an American professional football linebacker for the Minnesota Vikings of the National Football League (NFL). He played college football for the Minnesota Golden Gophers, and was selected by the New York Jets in the fifth round of the 2019 NFL draft.

== Professional career ==
Pre-draft measurables
Height	Weight	Arm length	Hand span	Wingspan	40-yard dash	10-yard split	20-yard split	20-yard shuttle	Three-cone drill	Vertical jump	Broad jump	Bench press
6 ft 1 1/8 in (1.86 m)	237 lb (108 kg)	30 1/8 in (0.77 m)	8 3/4 in (0.22 m)	6 ft 1 5/8 in (1.87 m)	4.50 s	1.55 s	2.63 s	4.12 s	6.95 s	37.5 in (0.95 m)	10 ft 4 in (3.15 m)	18 reps
All values from NFL Combine

=== New York Jets ===
Cashman was selected by the New York Jets in the fifth round (157th overall) of the 2019 NFL draft. He was placed on injured reserve on November 1, 2019.

On September 15, 2020, Cashman was placed on injured reserve after suffering a groin injury in Week 1. He was activated on October 17. On December 3, Cashman was placed back on injured reserve after suffering a hamstring injury.

On September 14, 2021, Cashman was placed on injured reserve. He was activated on October 9. Cashman was placed back on injured reserve after suffering a groin injury in Week 7.

=== Houston Texans ===
On March 18, 2022, Cashman was traded to the Houston Texans for a 2023 sixth-round pick. On December 2, he signed a one-year contract extension.

In Week 6 of the 2023 season, Cashman recorded 15 tackles, two for a loss, and two pass breakups in a 20–13 win over the New Orleans Saints, earning American Football Conference Defensive Player of the Week. In Week 11 against the Arizona Cardinals, Cashman shifted to the Mike linebacker position with Denzel Perryman suspended and Henry To'oTo'o out with a concussion. He recorded a career–high 19 tackles (13 solo), including two quarterback hits in the 21–16 victory.

=== Minnesota Vikings ===
On March 13, 2024, Cashman signed a three-year, $22.5 million contract with the Minnesota Vikings. He started 14 games in 2024, recording a team-leading and career-high 112 tackles, 4.5 sacks, and eight passes defensed.

Cashman began the 2025 season as one of Minnesota's starting linebackers. After suffering a hamstring injury in the team's season opener against the Chicago Bears, he was placed on injured reserve on September 11, 2025. Cashman was activated on October 18, ahead of Minnesota's Week 7 matchup against the Philadelphia Eagles.

In Week 7 of the 2026 season Cashman had 12 tackles, two sacks, four pass breakups, three QB hits with two tackles for loss and was named NFC Defensive Player of the Week.

== NFL career statistics ==
Legend
**Bold**	Career high

=== Regular season ===
Year	Team	Games		Tackles					Interceptions						Fumbles				
Year	Team	GP	GS	Cmb	Solo	Ast	Sck	TFL	Int	Yds	Avg	Lng	TD	PD	FF	Fmb	FR	Yds	TD
2019	NYJ	7	5	40	27	13	0.5	3	0	0	0.0	0	0	1	0	0	**1**	0	0
2020	NYJ	4	1	6	4	2	0.0	0	0	0	0.0	0	0	0	0	0	0	0	0
2021	NYJ	3	1	3	3	0	0.0	0	0	0	0.0	0	0	0	0	0	0	0	0
2022	HOU	16	1	26	19	7	3.0	4	0	0	0.0	0	0	2	0	0	**1**	0	0
2023	HOU	14	13	106	56	50	2.0	**9**	**1**	0	0.0	0	0	5	0	0	**1**	2	0
2024	MIN	14	14	112	**68**	44	**4.5**	8	0	0	0.0	0	0	**8**	0	0	**1**	**16**	0
2025	MIN	13	13	**144**	61	**83**	2.0	4	0	0	0.0	0	0	2	**1**	0	0	0	0
2026	MIN	8	8	76	41	35	4.5	8	0	0	0.0	0	0	7	0	0	1	0	0
Career		79	56	513	279	234	16.5	36	1	0	0.0	0	0	25	1	0	5	18	0

=== Postseason ===
Year	Team	Games		Tackles					Interceptions						Fumbles				
Year	Team	GP	GS	Cmb	Solo	Ast	Sck	TFL	Int	Yds	Avg	Lng	TD	PD	FF	Fmb	FR	Yds	TD
2023	HOU	2	0	**14**	**10**	4	**1.0**	**3**	0	0	0.0	0	0	0	0	0	0	0	0
2024	MIN	1	1	11	5	**6**	**1.0**	0	0	0	0.0	0	0	0	0	0	0	0	0
Career		3	1	25	15	10	2.0	3	0	0	0.0	0	0	0	0	0	0	0	0
