= 2023 Houston Texans season =

22nd season in franchise history

- Owner: Janice and D. Cal McNair
- General manager: Nick Caserio
- Head coach: DeMeco Ryans
- Offensive coordinator: Bobby Slowik
- Defensive coordinator: Matt Burke
- Home stadium: NRG Stadium

Results
- Record: 10–7
- Division place: 1st AFC South
- Playoffs: Won Wild Card Playoffs (vs. Browns) 45–14; Lost Divisional Playoffs (at Ravens) 10–34
- Pro Bowlers: OT Laremy Tunsil DE Will Anderson Jr. QB C. J. Stroud

Uniform
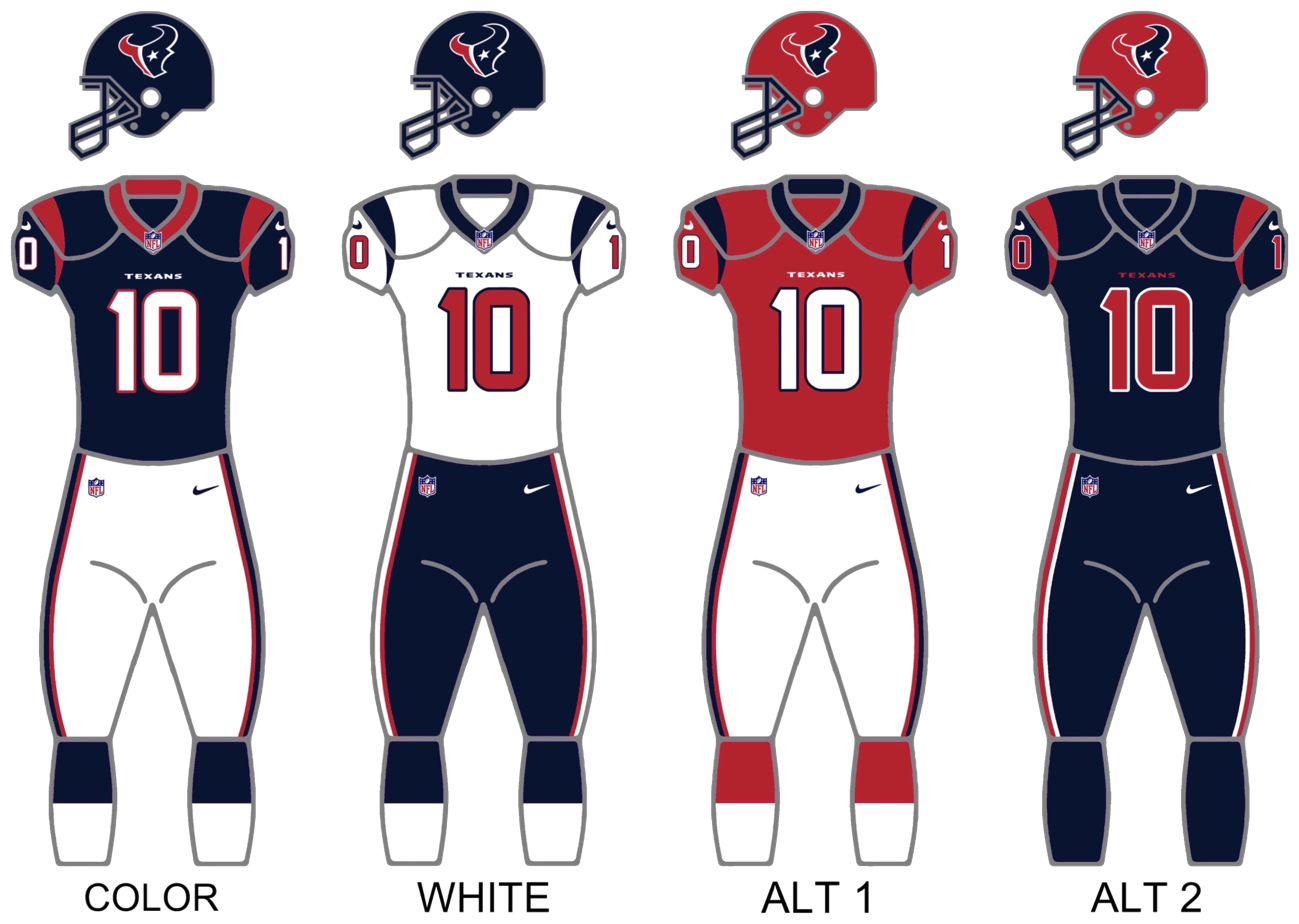

The 2023 season was the Houston Texans' 22nd season in the National Football League (NFL) and the first under head coach DeMeco Ryans. This season began with the team's fourth head coach in five seasons, and was also the team's fourth consecutive season with a different head coach. While the team went into the season with low expectations as a rebuilding period and started 0–2, they not only improved on their 3–13–1 record from last year with a Week 9 win over the Tampa Bay Buccaneers, but the Texans qualified for the playoffs for the first time since 2019 with a win over the Indianapolis Colts in Week 18, ending with a 10–7 record. After the Jacksonville Jaguars lost to the Tennessee Titans the day after, the Texans also clinched the AFC South for the first time since 2019. The Texans became the fifth team in NFL history to make the playoffs with both a rookie quarterback and a rookie head coach, as well as making history as the first team in NFL history to win a division entirely with a rookie head coach and rookie quarterback. (Note: The other teams to make the playoffs with a rookie QB and HC were: 2008 Atlanta Falcons; 2008 Baltimore Ravens; 2009 New York Jets; 2012 Indianapolis Colts)

In the Wild Card round of the playoffs, the Texans blew out the Cleveland Browns with a 45–14 win. The team's season would officially come to an end when they would lose to the one-seed Baltimore Ravens 34–10 in the Divisional round, preventing them from making their first AFC Championship appearance in franchise history.

In the NFL draft, the Texans selected quarterback C. J. Stroud from Ohio State second overall. Stroud would break several NFL and franchise rookie records on his way to being named NFL Offensive Rookie of the Year, becoming the first player in franchise history to win the award. After trading with the Arizona Cardinals, the Texans would select Alabama defensive end Will Anderson Jr. third overall. Anderson was named the NFL Defensive Rookie of the Year, marking the fourth time in NFL history that teammates won the offensive and defensive rookie of the year awards.

The Houston Texans drew an average home attendance of 71,193 in 9 home games in the 2023 NFL season.

== Offseason ==
On January 8, the Texans fired Lovie Smith after just one rebuilding season as the head coach with a record of 3–13–1. On January 31, the Texans hired San Francisco 49ers defensive coordinator and former player DeMeco Ryans as their new head coach.

=== Draft ===
2023 Houston Texans draft selections
Round	Selection	Player	Position	College	Notes
1	2	C. J. Stroud	QB	Ohio State	
1	3	Will Anderson Jr.	LB	Alabama	From Cardinals (Note: The Texans traded first- and second-round selections (12th and 33rd overall), and 2024 first- and third-round selections to the Arizona Cardinals in exchange for first- and fourth-round selections (3rd and 105th overall).)
1	12	Traded to the Arizona Cardinals			From Browns (Note: The Texans traded a 2024 sixth-round selection and QB Deshaun Watson to the Cleveland Browns in exchange for first- and third-round selections (12th and 73rd overall), 2022 first- and fourth-round selections, and 2024 first- and fourth-round selections.)
2	33	Traded to the Arizona Cardinals			
2	62	Juice Scruggs	C	Penn State	From Eagles (Note: The Texans traded third-, sixth- and seventh-round selections (65th, 188th and 230th overall) to the Philadelphia Eagles in exchange for a second-round selection (62nd overall).)
3	65	Traded to the Philadelphia Eagles			
3	69	Tank Dell	WR	Houston	From Rams (Note: The Texans traded third- and fifth-round selections (73rd and 161st overall) to the Los Angeles Rams in exchange for third- and sixth-round selections (69th and 191st overall).)
3	73	Traded to the Los Angeles Rams			From Browns
4	104	Traded to the Las Vegas Raiders (Note: The Texans traded fourth- and sixth-round selections (104th and 203rd overall) to the Las Vegas Raiders in exchange for fourth- and fifth-round selections (109th and 174th overall).)			
4	105	Traded to the Philadelphia Eagles (Note: The Texans traded a fourth-round selection (105th overall) to the Philadelphia Eagles in exchange for a 2024 third-round selection.)			From Cardinals
4	109	Dylan Horton	DE	TCU	From Raiders
5	—	Selection forfeited (Note: The Texans forfeited their fifth-round selection as punishment for a salary cap reporting violation.)			
5	161	Traded to the Los Angeles Rams			From Cowboys (Note: The Texans traded WR Brandin Cooks to the Dallas Cowboys in exchange for a fifth-round selection (161st overall) and a 2024 sixth-round selection.)
5	167	Henry To'oTo'o	LB	Alabama	Compensatory selection; from Rams (Note: The Texans traded fifth- and seventh-round selections (174th and 259th overall) to the Los Angeles Rams in exchange for a fifth-round selection (167th overall).)
5	174	Traded to the Los Angeles Rams			Compensatory selection; from Raiders
6	179	Traded to the Tampa Bay Buccaneers (Note: The Texans traded a sixth-round selection (179th overall) to the Tampa Bay Buccaneers in exchange for a seventh-round selection (230th overall) and G Shaq Mason.)			
6	188	Traded to the Philadelphia Eagles			From Saints (Note: The Texans traded CB Bradley Roby to the New Orleans Saints in exchange for a sixth-round selection (188th overall) and a 2022 third-round selection.)
6	191	Traded to the Philadelphia Eagles (Note: The Texans traded a sixth-round selection (191st overall) to the Philadelphia Eagles in exchange for two seventh-round selections (230th and 248th overall).)			From Packers via Rams
6	201	Jarrett Patterson	C	Notre Dame	From Vikings (Note: The Texans traded a seventh-round selection (219th overall) and DE Ross Blacklock to the Minnesota Vikings in exchange for a sixth-round selection (201st overall).)
6	203	Traded to the Las Vegas Raiders			From Giants (Note: The Texans traded CB Keion Crossen to the New York Giants in exchange for a sixth-round selection (203rd overall).)
6	205	Xavier Hutchinson	WR	Iowa State	From Bills (Note: The Texans traded a seventh-round selection (230th overall) and a 2024 sixth-round selection to the Buffalo Bills in exchange for a sixth-round selection (205th overall).)
6	207	Traded to the New York Jets (Note: The Texans traded a sixth-round selection (207th overall) to the New York Jets in exchange for LB Blake Cashman.)			From 49ers (Note: The Texans traded DE Charles Omenihu to the San Francisco 49ers in exchange for a sixth-round selection (207th overall).)
7	219	Traded to the Minnesota Vikings			
7	230	Traded to the Buffalo Bills			From Jets via Buccaneers, Texans and Eagles
7	248	Brandon Hill	S	Pittsburgh	From Eagles
7	259	Traded to the Los Angeles Rams			Supplemental compensatory selection

2023 Houston Texans undrafted free agents
Name	Position	College	Ref.
Jake Bates	K	Arkansas	
Tyler Beach	G/T	Wisconsin	
Joe Doyle	P	Memphis	
Dylan Deatherage	T	Western Michigan	
Ali Gaye	DE	LSU	
Darius Joyner	S	Duke	
Jesse Matthews	WR	San Diego State	
Jordan Murray	TE	Hawaii	
Xazavian Valladay	RB	Arizona State	
Jared Wayne	WR	Pittsburgh	
Kilian Zierer	T	Auburn	

Draft trades

== Staff ==
2023 Houston Texans staff
Front office: Owner/senior chairwoman – Janice McNair; CEO/chairman – Cal McNair; President – Greg Grissom; General manager – Nick Caserio; Executive vice president/general counsel – Greg Kondritz; Assistant director of player personnel and college scouting director – James Liipfert; Assistant director of player personnel – Chris Blanco; Director of football operations – Clay Hampton; Director of Pro Scouting – Ronnie McGill; Assistant director of pro scouting – D. J. Debick; Director of team development – Dylan Thompson; Head coaches: Head coach – DeMeco Ryans; Assistant head coach/running backs – Danny Barrett; Offensive coaches: Offensive coordinator – Bobby Slowik; Quarterbacks – Jerrod Johnson; Wide receivers/offensive passing game coordinator – Ben McDaniels; Tight ends – Jake Moreland; Offensive line – Chris Strausser; Assistant offensive line – Cole Popovich; Senior offensive assistant – Shane Day; Senior offensive assistant – Bill Lazor; Offensive assistant – Jarrod James; Offensive assistant – Denarius McGhee; Offensive quality control – Leander Wallace	Defensive coaches: Defensive coordinator – Matt Burke; Defensive passing game coordinator – Cory Undlin; Defensive line – Jacques Cesaire; Assistant defensive line – Rod Wright; Linebackers – Chris Kiffin; Defensive backs – Dino Vasso; Safeties – Stephen Adegoke; Defensive assistant – Ben Bolling; Defensive assistant – Ryan Milus; Special teams coaches: Special teams coordinator – Frank Ross; Assistant special teams coordinator – Will Burnham; Strength and conditioning: Head strength and conditioning – Mike Eubanks; Assistant strength and conditioning – Chris Cervantes; Assistant strength and conditioning – Joe Distor; Assistant strength and conditioning – Pat Moorer

== Final roster ==
2023 Houston Texans roster
Quarterbacks (QB): 18 Case Keenum; 10 Davis Mills; 7 C. J. Stroud; Running backs (RB): 47 Andrew Beck; 33 Dare Ogunbowale; 31 Dameon Pierce; 26 Devin Singletary; Wide receivers (WR): 12 Nico Collins; 19 Xavier Hutchinson; 8 John Metchie III; 82 Steven Sims; 2 Robert Woods; Tight ends (TE): 9 Brevin Jordan; 81 Eric Saubert; 86 Dalton Schultz	Offensive linemen (OL): 64 Nick Broeker G; 63 Michael Deiter C; 60 Dieter Eiselen G/C; 77 George Fant T; 67 Charlie Heck T; 74 Josh Jones T/G; 69 Shaq Mason G; 70 Juice Scruggs C; 78 Laremy Tunsil T; Defensive linemen (DL): 51 Will Anderson Jr. DE; 95 Derek Barnett DE; 96 Maliek Collins DT; 94 Khalil Davis DT; 52 Jonathan Greenard DE; 93 Kurt Hinish DT; 55 Jerry Hughes DE; 98 Sheldon Rankins DT; 41 Myjai Sanders DE; 97 Teair Tart DT	Linebackers (LB): 53 Blake Cashman OLB/MLB; 35 Jake Hansen OLB; 48 Christian Harris OLB; 43 Neville Hewitt MLB; 6 Denzel Perryman MLB; 39 Henry To'oTo'o OLB; Defensive backs (DB): 0 Adrian Amos SS; 17 Kris Boyd CB; 20 Ka'dar Hollman CB; 30 DeAndre Houston-Carson SS; 22 Kareem Jackson FS; 25 Desmond King CB; 21 Steven Nelson CB; 5 Jalen Pitre FS; 37 D'Angelo Ross CB; 24 Derek Stingley Jr. CB; Special teams (ST): 15 Kaʻimi Fairbairn K; 11 Cameron Johnston P; 46 Jon Weeks LS	Practice squad: 58 McTelvin Agim DT; 14 Alex Bachman WR; 16 Tim Boyle QB; 28 Brady Breeze SS; 87 Damiere Byrd WR; 13 Chase Cota WR; 90 Ali Gaye DE; 44 Marcell Harris MLB; 36 Brandon Hill FS; 56 Kerry Hyder DE; 88 Johnny Johnson III WR; 40 Dalton Keene TE; 79 Jimmy Morrissey C; 75 Adedayo Odeleye DE (IPP); 27 Troy Pride CB; 38 J. J. Taylor RB; 72 Jaylon Thomas G; 89 Jared Wayne WR (PS/I); Reserve: 25 Grayland Arnold SS (IR); 85 Noah Brown WR (IR); 3 Tank Dell WR (IR); 50 Kendrick Green G (IR); 59 Kenyon Green G (IR); 34 Troy Hairston FB (IR); 92 Dylan Horton DE (NF-Ill.); 71 Tytus Howard G (IR); 41 Jesse Matthews WR (IR); 23 Eric Murray SS (IR); 68 Jarrett Patterson C (IR); 54 Scott Quessenberry G/C (IR); 84 Teagan Quitoriano TE (IR); 91 Hassan Ridgeway DT (IR); 61 D. J. Scaife Jr. G (IR); 29 M. J. Stewart FS (IR); 4 Tavierre Thomas CB (IR); 1 Jimmie Ward (IR) SS/FS; 66 Kilian Zierer T (IR); Rookies in italics 53 active, 19 reserve, 16 practice squad (2 exempt)

== Preseason ==
Week	Date	Opponent	Result	Record	Venue	Recap
1	August 10	at New England Patriots	W 20–9	1–0	Gillette Stadium	Recap
2	August 19	Miami Dolphins	L 3–28	1–1	NRG Stadium	Recap
3	August 27	at New Orleans Saints	W 17–13	2–1	Caesars Superdome	Recap

== Regular season ==
=== Schedule ===
Week	Date	Opponent	Result	Record	Venue	Recap
1	September 10	at Baltimore Ravens	**L** 9–25	0–1	M&T Bank Stadium	Recap
2	September 17	**Indianapolis Colts**	**L** 20–31	0–2	NRG Stadium	Recap
3	September 24	at **Jacksonville Jaguars**	**W** 37–17	1–2	EverBank Stadium	Recap
4	October 1	Pittsburgh Steelers	**W** 30–6	2–2	NRG Stadium	Recap
5	October 8	at Atlanta Falcons	**L** 19–21	2–3	Mercedes-Benz Stadium	Recap
6	October 15	New Orleans Saints	**W** 20–13	3–3	NRG Stadium	Recap
7	Bye					
8	October 29	at Carolina Panthers	**L** 13–15	3–4	Bank of America Stadium	Recap
9	November 5	Tampa Bay Buccaneers	**W** 39–37	4–4	NRG Stadium	Recap
10	November 12	at Cincinnati Bengals	**W** 30–27	5–4	Paycor Stadium	Recap
11	November 19	Arizona Cardinals	**W** 21–16	6–4	NRG Stadium	Recap
12	November 26	**Jacksonville Jaguars**	**L** 21–24	6–5	NRG Stadium	Recap
13	December 3	Denver Broncos	**W** 22–17	7–5	NRG Stadium	Recap
14	December 10	at New York Jets	**L** 6–30	7–6	MetLife Stadium	Recap
15	December 17	at **Tennessee Titans**	**W** 19–16 (OT)	8–6	Nissan Stadium	Recap
16	December 24	Cleveland Browns	**L** 22–36	8–7	NRG Stadium	Recap
17	December 31	**Tennessee Titans**	**W** 26–3	9–7	NRG Stadium	Recap
18	January 6	at **Indianapolis Colts**	**W** 23–19	10–7	Lucas Oil Stadium	Recap

Note: Intra-division opponents are in bold text.

=== Game summaries ===
==== Week 1: at Baltimore Ravens ====
Week 1: Houston Texans at Baltimore Ravens – Game summary

Quarter	1	2	3	4	Total
Texans	0	6	0	3	**9**
**Ravens**	7	0	15	3	**25**

at M&T Bank Stadium, Baltimore, Maryland

- Date: September 10
- Game time: 1:00 p.m. EDT/12:00 p.m. CDT
- Game weather: Overcast, 78 °F (26 °C)
- Game attendance: 70,136
- Referee: Tra Blake
- TV announcers (CBS): Spero Dedes, Adam Archuleta and Aditi Kinkhabwala
- Recap, Game Book

Game information

**First quarter**

- BAL – J. K. Dobbins 4-yard run (Justin Tucker kick), 1:00. Ravens 7–0. **Drive: 9 plays, 58 yards, 4:28.**

**Second quarter**

- HOU – Kaʻimi Fairbairn 35-yard field goal, 3:56. Ravens 7–3. **Drive: 15 plays, 67 yards, 8:54.**
- HOU – Kaʻimi Fairbairn 38-yard field goal, 0:00. Ravens 7–6. **Drive: 11 plays, 68 yards, 1:54.**

**Third quarter**

- BAL – Justice Hill 2-yard run (Gus Edwards run), 9:55. Ravens 15–6. **Drive: 8 plays, 71 yards, 3:47.**
- BAL – Justice Hill 2-yard run (Justin Tucker kick), 5:21. Ravens 22–6. **Drive: 5 plays, 42 yards, 2:14.**

**Fourth quarter**

- HOU – Kaʻimi Fairbairn 36-yard field goal, 13:47. Ravens 22–9. **Drive: 6 plays, 14 yards, 1:39.**
- BAL – Justin Tucker 39-yard field goal, 4:10. Ravens 25–9. **Drive: 7 plays, 21 yards, 4:50.**

**Top passers**

- HOU – C. J. Stroud – 28/44, 242 yards
- BAL – Lamar Jackson – 17/22, 169 yards, INT

**Top rushers**

- HOU – Dameon Pierce – 11 rushes, 38 yards
- BAL – Lamar Jackson – 6 rushes, 38 yards

**Top receivers**

- HOU – Nico Collins – 6 receptions, 80 yards
- BAL – Zay Flowers – 9 receptions, 78 yards

In C. J. Stroud's NFL debut, his first completion was to himself, becoming the second quarterback in NFL history to do so, after Brett Favre.

==== Week 2: vs. Indianapolis Colts ====
Week 2: Indianapolis Colts at Houston Texans – Game summary

Quarter	1	2	3	4	Total
**Colts**	14	14	3	0	**31**
Texans	7	3	0	10	**20**

at NRG Stadium, Houston, Texas

- Date: September 17
- Game time: 12:00 p.m. CDT
- Game weather: None (retractable roof closed)
- Game attendance: 71,159
- Referee: Carl Cheffers
- TV announcers (Fox): Chris Myers, Robert Smith and Jen Hale
- Recap, Game Book

Game information

**First quarter**

- IND – Anthony Richardson 18-yard run (Matt Gay kick), 10:44. Colts 7–0. **Drive: 10 plays, 75 yards, 4:16.**
- IND – Anthony Richardson 15-yard run (Matt Gay kick), 9:13. Colts 14–0. **Drive: 1 play, 15 yards, 0:05.**
- HOU – Nico Collins 8-yard pass from C. J. Stroud (Kaʻimi Fairbairn kick), 3:14. Colts 14–7. **Drive: 13 plays, 68 yards, 5:59.**

**Second quarter**

- IND – Zack Moss 11-yard run (Matt Gay kick), 9:43. Colts 21–7. **Drive: 6 plays, 76 yards, 3:02.**
- HOU – Kaʻimi Fairbairn 29-yard field goal, 4:25. Colts 21–10. **Drive: 9 plays, 64 yards, 5:18.**
- IND – Kylen Granson 4-yard pass from Gardner Minshew (Matt Gay kick), 0:10. Colts 28–10. **Drive: 14 plays, 75 yards, 4:15.**

**Third quarter**

- IND – Matt Gay 42-yard field goal, 5:50. Colts 31–10. **Drive: 9 plays, 56 yards, 3:18.**

**Fourth quarter**

- HOU – Kaʻimi Fairbairn 36-yard field goal, 13:24. Colts 31–13. **Drive: 13 plays, 57 yards, 7:26.**
- HOU – Tank Dell 23-yard pass from C. J. Stroud (Kaʻimi Fairbairn kick), 9:48. Colts 31–20. **Drive: 5 plays, 67 yards, 1:41.**

**Top passers**

- IND – Gardner Minshew – 19/23, 171 yards, TD
- HOU – C. J. Stroud – 30/47, 384 yards, 2 TD

**Top rushers**

- IND – Zack Moss – 18 rushes, 88 yards, TD
- HOU – Dameon Pierce – 15 rushes, 31 yards

**Top receivers**

- IND – Michael Pittman Jr. – 8 receptions, 56 yards
- HOU – Nico Collins – 7 receptions, 146 yards, TD

==== Week 3: at Jacksonville Jaguars ====
Week 3: Houston Texans at Jacksonville Jaguars – Game summary

Quarter	1	2	3	4	Total
**Texans**	7	10	7	13	**37**
Jaguars	0	0	10	7	**17**

at EverBank Stadium, Jacksonville, Florida

- Date: September 24
- Game time: 1:00 p.m. EDT/12:00 p.m. CDT
- Game weather: 84 °F (29 °C)
- Game attendance: 61,466
- Referee: Scott Novak
- TV announcers (Fox): Chris Myers, Robert Smith and Jen Hale
- Recap, Game Book

Game information

**First quarter**

- HOU – Dameon Pierce 1-yard run (Kaʻimi Fairbairn kick), 7:35. Texans 7–0. **Drive: 7 plays, 62 yards, 3:57.**

**Second quarter**

- HOU – Brevin Jordan 4-yard pass from C. J. Stroud (Kaʻimi Fairbairn kick), 7:27. Texans 14–0. **Drive: 7 plays, 41 yards, 4:24.**
- HOU – Kaʻimi Fairbairn 28-yard field goal, 0:00. Texans 17–0. **Drive: 9 plays, 56 yards, 1:04.**

**Third quarter**

- JAX – Tank Bigsby 1-yard run (Brandon McManus kick), 11:17. Texans 17–7. **Drive: 7 plays, 67 yards, 3:43.**
- JAX – Brandon McManus 33-yard field goal, 4:35. Texans 17–10. **Drive: 8 plays, 53 yards, 4:44.**
- HOU – Andrew Beck 85-yard kickoff return (Kaʻimi Fairbairn kick), 4:19. Texans 24–10.

**Fourth quarter**

- HOU – Kaʻimi Fairbairn 26-yard field goal, 12:36. Texans 27–10. **Drive: 10 plays, 41 yards, 4:44.**
- JAX – Christian Kirk 26-yard pass from Trevor Lawrence (Brandon McManus kick), 10:40. Texans 27–17. **Drive: 6 plays, 75 yards, 1:56.**
- HOU – Tank Dell 68-yard pass from C. J. Stroud (Kaʻimi Fairbairn kick), 8:59. Texans 34–17. **Drive: 3 plays, 75 yards, 1:41.**
- HOU – Kaʻimi Fairbairn 33-yard field goal, 2:10. Texans 37–17. **Drive: 7 plays, 29 yards, 4:35.**

**Top passers**

- HOU – C. J. Stroud – 20/30, 280 yards, 2 TD
- JAX – Trevor Lawrence – 27/40, 279 yards, TD, INT

**Top rushers**

- HOU – Devin Singletary – 9 rushes, 41 yards
- JAX – Travis Etienne – 19 rushes, 88 yards

**Top receivers**

- HOU – Tank Dell – 5 receptions, 145 yards, TD
- JAX – Evan Engram – 7 receptions, 67 yards

==== Week 4: vs. Pittsburgh Steelers ====
Week 4: Pittsburgh Steelers at Houston Texans – Game summary

Quarter	1	2	3	4	Total
Steelers	0	0	6	0	**6**
**Texans**	10	6	0	14	**30**

at NRG Stadium, Houston, Texas

- Date: October 1
- Game time: 12:00 p.m. CDT
- Game weather: None (retractable roof closed)
- Game attendance: 71,399
- Referee: Bill Vinovich
- TV announcers (CBS): Spero Dedes, Adam Archuleta and Amanda Renner
- Recap, Game Book

Game information

**First quarter**

- HOU – Nico Collins 2-yard pass from C. J. Stroud (Kaʻimi Fairbairn kick), 8:55. Texans 7–0. **Drive: 12 plays, 69 yards, 6:05.**
- HOU – Kaʻimi Fairbairn 36-yard field goal, 1:20. Texans 10–0. **Drive: 9 plays, 27 yards, 3:26.**

**Second quarter**

- HOU – Kaʻimi Fairbairn 38-yard field goal, 12:09. Texans 13–0. **Drive: 7 plays, 48 yards, 2:43.**
- HOU – Kaʻimi Fairbairn 39-yard field goal, 0:00. Texans 16–0. **Drive: 5 plays, 57 yards, 0:41.**

**Third quarter**

- PIT – Chris Boswell 35-yard field goal, 9:31. Texans 16–3. **Drive: 10 plays, 58 yards, 5:29.**
- PIT – Chris Boswell 23-yard field goal, 5:47. Texans 16–6. **Drive: 7 plays, 41 yards, 2:53.**

**Fourth quarter**

- HOU – Dalton Schultz 6-yard pass from Devin Singletary (Kaʻimi Fairbairn kick), 10:50. Texans 23–6. **Drive: 10 plays, 58 yards, 5:20.**
- HOU – Nico Collins 52-yard pass from C. J. Stroud (Kaʻimi Fairbairn kick), 3:39. Texans 30–6. **Drive: 11 plays, 86 yards, 6:24.**

**Top passers**

- PIT – Kenny Pickett – 15/23, 114 yards, INT
- HOU – C. J. Stroud – 16/30, 306 yards, 2 TD

**Top rushers**

- PIT – Najee Harris – 14 rushes, 71 yards
- HOU – Dameon Pierce – 24 rushes, 81 yards

**Top receivers**

- PIT – Najee Harris – 1 reception, 32 yards
- HOU – Nico Collins – 7 receptions, 168 yards, 2 TD

For the second straight week, the Texans had back-to-back upset victories, and improved to 2–2. Former defensive end J. J. Watt was inducted to the Houston Texans Ring of Honor during halftime. Coincidentally, his brother T. J. Watt was playing in this game, though for the Pittsburgh Steelers.

==== Week 5: at Atlanta Falcons ====
Week 5: Houston Texans at Atlanta Falcons – Game summary

Quarter	1	2	3	4	Total
Texans	3	6	3	7	**19**
**Falcons**	7	0	0	14	**21**

at Mercedes-Benz Stadium, Atlanta, Georgia

- Date: October 8
- Game time: 1:00 p.m. EDT/12:00 p.m. CDT
- Game weather: Sunny, 63 °F (17 °C) (retractable roof open)
- Game attendance: 69,461
- Referee: Shawn Hochuli
- TV announcers (Fox): Brandon Gaudin, Mark Schlereth and Kristina Pink
- Recap, Game Book

Game information

**First quarter**

- HOU — Kaʻimi Fairbairn 38-yard field goal, 10:38. Texans 3–0. **Drive: 6 plays. 28 yards, 2:56.**
- ATL — Desmond Ridder 7-yard run (Younghoe Koo kick), 6:48. Falcons 7–3. **Drive: 7 plays, 75 yards, 3:50.**

**Second quarter**

- HOU – Kaʻimi Fairbairn 43-yard field goal, 14:10. Falcons 7–6. **Drive: 7 plays, 49 yards, 2:59.**
- HOU – Kaʻimi Fairbairn 28-yard field goal, 0:03. Texans 9–7. **Drive: 10 plays, 79 yards, 1:42.**

**Third quarter**

- HOU — Kaʻimi Fairbairn 42-yard field goal, 9:35. Texans 12–7. **Drive: 4 plays, 6 yards, 1:19.**

**Fourth quarter**

- ATL – Bijan Robinson 6-yard pass from Desmond Ridder (Desmond Ridder–Tyler Allgeier pass), 12:12. Falcons 15–12. **Drive: 13 plays, 74 yards, 6:41.**
- ATL – Younghoe Koo 33-yard field goal, 6:57. Falcons 18–12. **Drive: 9 plays, 59 yards, 4:15.**
- HOU – Dalton Schultz 18-yard pass from C. J. Stroud (Kaʻimi Fairbairn kick), 1:49. Texans 19–18. **Drive: 11 plays, 75 yards, 5:08.**
- ATL – Younghoe Koo 37-yard field goal, 0:00. Falcons 21–19. **Drive: 10 plays, 56 yards, 1:49.**

**Top passers**

- HOU – C. J. Stroud – 20/35, 249 yards, TD
- ATL – Desmond Ridder – 28/37, 329 yards, TD

**Top rushers**

- HOU – Dameon Pierce – 20 rushes, 66 yards
- ATL – Bijan Robinson – 14 rushes, 46 yards

**Top receivers**

- HOU – Dalton Schultz – 7 receptions, 65 yards, TD
- ATL – Kyle Pitts – 7 receptions, 87 yards

==== Week 6: vs. New Orleans Saints ====
Week 6: New Orleans Saints at Houston Texans – Game summary

Quarter	1	2	3	4	Total
Saints	7	3	3	0	**13**
**Texans**	7	10	3	0	**20**

at NRG Stadium, Houston, Texas

- Date: October 15
- Game time: 12:00 p.m. CDT
- Game weather: None (retractable roof closed)
- Game attendance: 71,810
- Referee: Alan Eck
- TV announcers (Fox): Chris Myers, Mark Schlereth and Kristina Pink
- Recap, Game Book

Game information

**First quarter**

- HOU – Dalton Schultz 1-yard pass from C. J. Stroud (Kaʻimi Fairbairn kick), 3:41. Texans 7–0. **Drive: 6 plays, 59 yards, 2:15.**
- NO – Rashid Shaheed 34-yard pass from Derek Carr (Blake Grupe kick), 0:13. Tied 7–7. **Drive: 9 plays, 75 yards, 3:28.**

**Second quarter**

- HOU – Kaʻimi Fairbairn 24-yard field goal, 10:28. Texans 10–7. **Drive: 11 plays, 70 yards, 4:45.**
- HOU – Robert Woods 6-yard pass from C. J. Stroud (Kaʻimi Fairbairn kick), 2:56. Texans 17–7. **Drive: 10 plays, 65 yards, 6:11.**
- NO – Blake Grupe 48-yard field goal, 0:18. Texans 17–10. **Drive: 13 plays, 46 yards, 2:38.**

**Third quarter**

- HOU – Kaʻimi Fairbairn 22-yard field goal, 7:01. Texans 20–10. **Drive: 6 plays, 46 yards, 2:09.**
- NO – Blake Grupe 45-yard field goal, 2:17. Texans 20–13. **Drive: 10 plays, 48 yards, 4:44.**

**Fourth quarter**

- No scoring plays

**Top passers**

- NO – Derek Carr – 32/50, 353 yards, TD, INT
- HOU – C. J. Stroud – 13/27, 199 yards, 2 TD, INT

**Top rushers**

- NO – Alvin Kamara – 19 rushes, 68 yards
- HOU – Devin Singletary – 12 rushes, 58 yards

**Top receivers**

- NO – Chris Olave – 7 receptions, 96 yards
- HOU – Nico Collins – 4 receptions, 80 yards

With the win, the Texans improved to 3–3 and matched their win total from the previous season.

==== Week 8: at Carolina Panthers ====
Week 8: Houston Texans at Carolina Panthers – Game summary

Quarter	1	2	3	4	Total
Texans	0	7	6	0	**13**
**Panthers**	0	6	6	3	**15**

at Bank of America Stadium, Charlotte, North Carolina

- Date: October 29
- Game time: 1:00 p.m. EDT/12:00 p.m. CDT
- Game weather: Clear, 76 °F (24 °C)
- Game attendance: 71,505
- Referee: John Hussey
- TV announcers (Fox): Brandon Gaudin, Robert Smith and Jen Hale
- Recap, Game Book

Game information

**First quarter**

- No scoring plays.

**Second quarter**

- HOU – Andrew Beck 1-yard run (Kaʻimi Fairbairn kick), 13:13. Texans 7–0. **Drive: 17 plays, 92 yards, 9:20.**
- CAR – Tommy Tremble 1-yard pass from Bryce Young (kick failed), 1:35. Texans 7–6. **Drive: 9 plays, 60 yards, 3:18.**

**Third quarter**

- CAR – Eddy Piñeiro 46-yard field goal, 10:46. Panthers 9–7. **Drive: 9 plays, 49 yards, 4:14.**
- CAR – Eddy Piñeiro 37-yard field goal, 7:58. Panthers 12–7. **Drive: 4 plays, 8 yards, 1:57.**
- HOU – C. J. Stroud 1-yard run (pass failed), 0:35. Texans 13–12. **Drive: 12 plays, 75 yards, 7:23.**

**Fourth quarter**

- CAR – Eddy Piñeiro 23-yard field goal, 0:00. Panthers 15–13. **Drive: 15 plays, 86 yards, 6:17.**

**Top passers**

- HOU – C. J. Stroud – 16/24, 140 yards
- CAR – Bryce Young – 22/31, 235 yards, TD

**Top rushers**

- HOU – Dameon Pierce – 12 rushes, 46 yards
- CAR – Chuba Hubbard – 15 rushes, 28 yards

**Top receivers**

- HOU – Nico Collins – 4 receptions, 30 yards
- CAR – Adam Thielen – 8 receptions, 72 yards

==== Week 9: vs. Tampa Bay Buccaneers ====
Week 9: Tampa Bay Buccaneers at Houston Texans – Game summary

Quarter	1	2	3	4	Total
Buccaneers	10	7	6	14	**37**
**Texans**	7	3	12	17	**39**

at NRG Stadium, Houston, Texas

- Date: November 5
- Game time: 12:00 p.m. CST
- Game weather: None (retractable roof closed)
- Game attendance: 70,785
- Referee: Land Clark
- TV announcers (CBS): Ian Eagle, Charles Davis and Evan Washburn
- Recap, Game Book

Game information

**First quarter**

- TB – Chase McLaughlin 35-yard field goal, 12:56. Buccaneers 3–0. **Drive: 5 plays, 25 yards, 1:42.**
- HOU – Nico Collins 14-yard pass from C. J. Stroud (Kaʻimi Fairbairn kick), 9:10. Texans 7–3. **Drive: 7 plays, 75 yards, 3:46.**
- TB – Cade Otton 3-yard pass from Baker Mayfield (Chase McLaughlin kick), 2:13. Buccaneers 10–7. **Drive: 13 plays, 75 yards, 6:57.**

**Second quarter**

- TB – Rachaad White 1-yard run (Chase McLaughlin kick), 9:05. Buccaneers 17–7. **Drive: 6 plays, 40 yards, 2:58.**
- HOU – Kaʻimi Fairbairn 50-yard field goal, 5:17. Buccaneers 17–10. **Drive: 10 plays, 43 yards, 3:48.**

**Third quarter**

- TB – Chase McLaughlin 49-yard field goal, 12:38. Buccaneers 20–10. **Drive: 7 plays, 42 yards, 2:22.**
- HOU – Noah Brown 75-yard pass from C. J. Stroud (pass failed), 12:20. Buccaneers 20–16. **Drive: 1 play, 75 yards, 0:18.**
- TB – Chase McLaughlin 55-yard field goal, 9:23. Buccaneers 23–16. **Drive: 6 plays, 38 yards, 2:57.**
- HOU – Tank Dell 29-yard pass from C. J. Stroud (pass failed), 5:59. Buccaneers 23–22. **Drive: 6 plays, 79 yards, 3:24.**

**Fourth quarter**

- HOU – Dalton Schultz 9-yard pass from C. J. Stroud (C. J. Stroud run), 14:11. Texans 30–23. **Drive: 9 plays, 52 yards, 4:26.**
- TB – Rachaad White 1-yard run (Chase McLaughlin kick), 11:43. Tied 30–30. **Drive: 6 plays, 75 yards, 2:28.**
- HOU – Dare Ogunbowale 29-yard field goal, 8:45. Texans 33–30. **Drive: 7 plays, 64 yards, 2:58.**
- TB – Cade Otton 14-yard pass from Baker Mayfield (Chase McLaughlin kick), 0:46. Buccaneers 37–33. **Drive: 10 plays, 61 yards, 3:41.**
- HOU – Tank Dell 15-yard pass from C. J. Stroud (run failed), 0:06. Texans 39–37. **Drive: 6 plays, 75 yards, 0:40.**

**Top passers**

- TB – Baker Mayfield – 20/29, 250 yards, 2 TD
- HOU – C. J. Stroud – 30/42, 470 yards, 5 TD

**Top rushers**

- TB – Rachaad White – 20 rushes, 73 yards, 2 TD
- HOU – Devin Singletary – 13 rushes, 26 yards

**Top receivers**

- TB – Mike Evans – 4 receptions, 87 yards
- HOU – Noah Brown – 6 receptions, 157 yards, TD

Placekicker Kaʻimi Fairbairn exited the game at halftime with a quad injury. Running back Dare Ogunbowale handled kickoffs for the Texans during the second half.

Quarterback C. J. Stroud sets the NFL single-game record for passing yards by a rookie with 470 passing yards, surpassing the record set by Indianapolis Colts quarterback Andrew Luck. Despite the Buccaneers taking a 4-point lead with just 46 seconds left, CJ Stroud marched 75 yards down the field to score the game-winning touchdown.

==== Week 10: at Cincinnati Bengals ====
Week 10: Houston Texans at Cincinnati Bengals – Game summary

Quarter	1	2	3	4	Total
**Texans**	0	10	10	10	**30**
Bengals	7	0	10	10	**27**

at Paycor Stadium, Cincinnati, Ohio

- Date: November 12
- Game time: 1:00 p.m. EST/12:00 p.m. CST
- Game weather: Sunny, 56 °F (13 °C)
- Game attendance: 66,526
- Referee: Carl Cheffers
- TV announcers (CBS): Kevin Harlan, Trent Green and Melanie Collins
- Recap, Game Book

Game information

**First quarter**

- CIN – Trenton Irwin 32-yard pass from Joe Burrow (Evan McPherson kick), 9:43. Bengals 7–0. **Drive: 10 plays, 75 yards, 5:17.**

**Second quarter**

- HOU – Tank Dell 6-yard pass from C. J. Stroud (Matt Ammendola kick), 10:33. Tied 7–7. **Drive: 7 plays, 66 yards, 3:03.**
- HOU – Matt Ammendola 45-yard field goal, 0:10. Texans 10–7. **Drive: 9 plays, 61 yards, 2:30.**

**Third quarter**

- HOU – Matt Ammendola 22-yard field goal, 9:27. Texans 13–7. **Drive: 11 plays, 72 yards, 5:33.**
- HOU – Devin Singletary 6-yard run (Matt Ammendola kick), 7:08. Texans 20–7. **Drive: 2 plays, 59 yards, 0:51.**
- CIN – Evan McPherson 50-yard field goal, 3:00. Texans 20–10. **Drive: 7 plays, 43 yards, 4:08.**
- CIN – Ja'Marr Chase 64-yard pass from Joe Burrow (Evan McPherson kick), 0:10. Texans 20–17. **Drive: 3 plays, 73 yards, 1:23.**

**Fourth quarter**

- HOU – C. J. Stroud 8-yard run (Matt Ammendola kick), 12:47. Texans 27–17. **Drive: 6 plays, 75 yards, 2:23.**
- CIN – Joe Mixon 1-yard run (Evan McPherson kick), 3:18. Texans 27–24. **Drive: 2 plays, 4 yards, 0:15.**
- CIN – Evan McPherson 31-yard field goal, 1:33. Tied 27–27. **Drive: 6 plays, 58 yards, 0:37.**
- HOU – Matt Ammendola 38-yard field goal, 0:00. Texans 30–27. **Drive: 6 plays, 55 yards, 1:33.**

**Top passers**

- HOU – C. J. Stroud – 23/39, 356 yards, TD, INT
- CIN – Joe Burrow – 27/40, 347 yards, 2 TD, 2 INT

**Top rushers**

- HOU – Devin Singletary – 30 rushes, 150 yards, TD
- CIN – Joe Mixon – 11 rushes, 46 yards, TD

**Top receivers**

- HOU – Noah Brown – 7 receptions, 172 yards
- CIN – Ja'Marr Chase – 5 receptions, 124 yards, TD

==== Week 11: vs. Arizona Cardinals ====
Week 11: Arizona Cardinals at Houston Texans – Game summary

Quarter	1	2	3	4	Total
Cardinals	10	0	6	0	**16**
**Texans**	7	14	0	0	**21**

at NRG Stadium, Houston, Texas

- Date: November 19
- Game time: 12:00 p.m. CST
- Game weather: None (retractable roof closed)
- Game attendance: 70,247
- Referee: Alex Kemp
- TV announcers (CBS): Tom McCarthy, James Lofton, Jay Feely and Tiffany Blackmon
- Recap, Game Book

Game information

**First quarter**

- ARI – Rondale Moore 48-yard pass from Kyler Murray (Matt Prater kick), 13:28. Cardinals 7–0. **Drive: 3 plays, 75 yards, 1:32.**
- HOU – Dalton Schultz 20-yard pass from C. J. Stroud (Matt Ammendola kick), 5:48. Tied 7–7. **Drive: 5 plays, 61 yards, 1:57.**
- ARI – Matt Prater 57-yard field goal, 1:21. Cardinals 10–7. **Drive: 9 plays, 36 yards, 4:27.**

**Second quarter**

- HOU – Devin Singletary 11-yard run (Matt Ammendola kick), 11:20. Texans 14–10. **Drive: 10 plays, 75 yards, 5:01.**
- HOU – Tank Dell 40-yard pass from C. J. Stroud (Matt Ammendola kick), 0:26. Texans 21–10. **Drive: 6 plays, 74 yards, 1:49.**

**Third quarter**

- ARI – Kyler Murray 1-yard run (run failed), 2:52. Texans 21–16. **Drive: 12 plays, 62 yards, 6:23.**

**Fourth quarter**

- No scoring plays.

**Top passers**

- ARI – Kyler Murray – 20/30, 214 yards, TD, INT
- HOU – C. J. Stroud – 27/37, 336 yards, 2 TD, 3 INT

**Top rushers**

- ARI – James Conner – 14 rushes, 62 yards
- HOU – Devin Singletary – 22 rushes, 112 yards, TD

**Top receivers**

- ARI – Greg Dortch – 6 receptions, 76 yards
- HOU – Tank Dell – 8 receptions, 149 yards, TD

==== Week 12: vs. Jacksonville Jaguars ====
Week 12: Jacksonville Jaguars at Houston Texans – Game summary

Quarter	1	2	3	4	Total
**Jaguars**	3	10	8	3	**24**
Texans	0	7	7	7	**21**

at NRG Stadium, Houston, Texas

- Date: November 26
- Game time: 12:00 p.m. CST
- Game weather: None (retractable roof closed)
- Game attendance: 71,324
- Referee: Clay Martin
- TV announcers (CBS): Andrew Catalon, Tiki Barber, Matt Ryan and AJ Ross
- Recap, Game Book

Game information

**First quarter**

- JAX – Brandon McManus 40-yard field goal, 5:54. Jaguars 3–0. **Drive: 12 plays, 65 yards, 5:54.**

**Second quarter**

- JAX – Trevor Lawrence 1-yard run (Brand McManus kick), 9:43. Jaguars 10–0. **Drive: 8 plays, 68 yards, 4:39.**
- HOU – Tank Dell 7-yard pass from C. J. Stroud (Matt Ammendola kick), 6:37. Jaguars 10–7. **Drive: 5 plays, 75 yards, 3:06.**
- JAX – Brandon McManus 48-yard field goal, 2:24. Jaguars 13–7. **Drive: 8 plays, 45 yards, 4:13.**

**Third quarter**

- HOU – C. J. Stroud 1-yard run (Matt Ammendola kick), 8:10. Texans 14–13. **Drive: 7 plays, 46 yards, 3:39.**
- JAX – Calvin Ridley 1-yard pass from Trevor Lawrence (Trevor Lawrence–Calvin Ridley pass), 4:29. Jaguars 21–14. **Drive: 8 plays, 75 yards, 3:41.**

**Fourth quarter**

- JAX – Brandon McManus 53-yard field goal, 11:20. Jaguars 24–14. **Drive: 10 plays, 54 yards, 6:13.**
- HOU – Nico Collins 17-yard pass from C. J. Stroud (Matt Ammendola kick), 5:15. Jaguars 24–21. **Drive: 5 plays, 55 yards, 1:50.**

**Top passers**

- JAX – Trevor Lawrence – 23/38, 364 yards, TD, INT
- HOU – C. J. Stroud – 26/36, 304 yards, 2 TD

**Top rushers**

- JAX – Travis Etienne – 20 rushes, 56 yards
- HOU – C. J. Stroud – 6 rushes, 47 yards, TD

**Top receivers**

- JAX – Calvin Ridley – 5 receptions, 89 yards, TD
- HOU – Nico Collins – 7 receptions, 104 yards, TD

==== Week 13: vs. Denver Broncos ====
Week 13: Denver Broncos at Houston Texans – Game summary

Quarter	1	2	3	4	Total
Broncos	0	3	7	7	**17**
**Texans**	10	3	3	6	**22**

at NRG Stadium, Houston, Texas

- Date: December 3
- Game time: 12:00 p.m. CST
- Game weather: None (retractable roof closed)
- Game attendance: 71,670
- Referee: Shawn Smith
- TV announcers (CBS): Ian Eagle, Charles Davis and Evan Washburn
- Recap, Game Book

Game information

**First quarter**

- HOU – Matt Ammendola 29-yard field goal, 10:11. Texans 3–0. **Drive: 5 plays, 36 yards, 2:03.**
- HOU – Dameon Pierce 3-yard run (Matt Ammendola kick), 3:49. Texans 10–0. **Drive: 10 plays, 78 yards, 4:22.**

**Second quarter**

- HOU – Matt Ammendola 38-yard field goal, 12:54. Texans 13–0. **Drive: 7 plays, 69 yards, 3:12.**
- DEN – Wil Lutz 34-yard field goal, 1:24. Texans 13–3. **Drive: 13 plays, 56 yards, 5:09.**

**Third quarter**

- HOU – Matt Ammendola 38-yard field goal, 8:51. Texans 16–3. **Drive: 7 plays, 40 yards, 4:02.**
- DEN – Courtland Sutton 45-yard pass from Russell Wilson (Wil Lutz kick), 4:47. Texans 16–10. **Drive: 3 plays, 58 yards, 1:20.**

**Fourth quarter**

- HOU – Nico Collins 3-yard pass from C. J. Stroud (pass failed), 14:16. Texans 22–10. **Drive: 4 plays, 21 yards, 1:43.**
- DEN – Russell Wilson 1-yard run (Wil Lutz kick), 12:04. Texans 22–17. **Drive: 5 plays, 75 yards, 2:12.**

**Top passers**

- DEN – Russell Wilson – 15/26, 186 yards, TD, 3 INT
- HOU – C. J. Stroud – 16/27, 274 yards, TD

**Top rushers**

- DEN – Javonte Williams – 13 rushes, 46 yards
- HOU – Dameon Pierce – 15 rushes, 41 yards, TD

**Top receivers**

- DEN – Jerry Jeudy – 3 receptions, 51 yards
- HOU – Nico Collins – 9 receptions, 191 yards, TD

==== Week 14: at New York Jets ====
Week 14: Houston Texans at New York Jets – Game summary

Quarter	1	2	3	4	Total
Texans	0	0	6	0	**6**
**Jets**	0	0	14	16	**30**

at MetLife Stadium, East Rutherford, New Jersey

- Date: December 10
- Game time: 1:00 p.m. EST/12:00 p.m. CST
- Game weather: Rain, 58 °F (14 °C)
- Game attendance: 72,956
- Referee: Brad Allen
- TV announcers (CBS): Kevin Harlan, Trent Green and Melanie Collins
- Recap, Game Book

Game information

**First quarter**

- No scoring plays.

**Second quarter**

- No scoring plays.

**Third quarter**

- NYJ – Randall Cobb 15-yard pass from Zach Wilson (Greg Zuerlein kick), 11:05. Jets 7–0. **Drive: 7 plays, 75 yards, 3:55.**
- NYJ – Xavier Gipson 9-yard run (Greg Zuerlein kick), 4:31. Jets 14–0. **Drive: 8 plays, 69 yards, 5:02.**
- HOU – Devin Singletary 1-yard run (kick failed), 0:00. Jets 14–6. **Drive: 4 plays, 57 yards, 1:20.**

**Fourth quarter**

- NYJ – Breece Hall 3-yard pass from Zach Wilson (Greg Zuerlein kick), 9:27. Jets 21–6. **Drive: 10 plays, 75 yards, 5:33.**
- NYJ – Greg Zuerlein 51-yard field goal, 6:51. Jets 24–6. **Drive: 4 plays, 2 yards, 1:20.**
- NYJ – Greg Zuerlein 55-yard field goal, 4:30. Jets 27–6. **Drive: 5 plays, 6 yards, 1:43.**
- NYJ – Greg Zuerlein 44-yard field goal, 1:08. Jets 30–6. **Drive: 4 plays, 1 yards, 2:10.**

**Top passers**

- HOU – C. J. Stroud – 10/23, 91 yards
- NYJ – Zach Wilson – 27/36, 301 yards, 2 TD

**Top rushers**

- HOU – Devin Singletary – 13 rushes, 65 yards, TD
- NYJ – Breece Hall – 10 rushes, 40 yards

**Top receivers**

- HOU – Brevin Jordan – 3 receptions, 35 yards
- NYJ – Garrett Wilson – 9 receptions, 108 yards

==== Week 15: at Tennessee Titans ====
Week 15: Houston Texans at Tennessee Titans – Game summary

Quarter	1	2	3	4	OT	Total
**Texans**	0	3	6	7	3	**19**
Titans	6	7	0	3	0	**16**

at Nissan Stadium, Nashville, Tennessee

- Date: December 17
- Game time: 12:00 p.m. CST
- Game weather: Cloudy, 48 °F (9 °C)
- Game attendance: 66,219
- Referee: Clete Blakeman
- TV announcers (CBS): Spero Dedes, Adam Archuleta and Aditi Kinkhabwala
- Recap, Game Book

Game information

**First quarter**

- TEN – Will Levis 1-yard run (kick failed), 7:09. Titans 6–0. **Drive: 11 plays, 83 yards, 5:46.**

**Second quarter**

- TEN – Elijah Molden 44-yard interception return (Nick Folk kick), 13:56. Titans 13–0. **Drive: 7 plays, 75 yards, 3:55.**
- HOU – Kaʻimi Fairbairn 23-yard field goal, 0:00. Titans 13–3. **Drive: 13 plays, 52 yards, 5:38.**

**Third quarter**

- HOU – Kaʻimi Fairbairn 27-yard field goal, 6:27. Titans 13–6. **Drive: 10 plays, 51 yards, 5:50.**
- HOU – Kaʻimi Fairbairn 53-yard field goal, 2:42. Titans 13–9. **Drive: 4 plays, 11 yards, 1:55.**

**Fourth quarter**

- TEN – Nick Folk 45-yard field goal, 7:28. Titans 16–9. **Drive: 8 plays, 19 yards, 4:45.**
- HOU – Noah Brown 3-yard pass from Case Keenum (Kaʻimi Fairbairn kick), 3:03. Tied 16–16. **Drive: 10 plays, 79 yards, 4:25.**

**Overtime**

- HOU – Kaʻimi Fairbairn 54-yard field goal, 0:00. Texans 19–16. **Drive: 5 plays, 44 yards, 1:43.**

**Top passers**

- HOU – Case Keenum – 23/36, 229 yards, TD, INT
- TEN – Will Levis – 17/26, 199 yards, INT

**Top rushers**

- HOU – Devin Singletary – 26 rushes, 121 yards
- TEN – Tyjae Spears – 9 rushes, 30 yards

**Top receivers**

- HOU – Noah Brown – 8 receptions, 82 yards, TD
- TEN – Treylon Burks – 3 receptions, 62 yards

==== Week 16: vs. Cleveland Browns ====
Week 16: Cleveland Browns at Houston Texans – Game summary

Quarter	1	2	3	4	Total
**Browns**	7	15	6	8	**36**
Texans	0	7	0	15	**22**

at NRG Stadium, Houston, Texas

- Date: December 24
- Game time: 12:00 p.m. CST
- Game weather: None (retractable roof closed)
- Game attendance: 70,831
- Referee: Tra Blake
- TV announcers (CBS): Ian Eagle, Charles Davis and Evan Washburn
- Recap, Game Book

Game information

**First quarter**

- CLE – Jerome Ford 4-yard run (Dustin Hopkins kick), 13:18. Browns 7–0. **Drive: 4 plays, 59 yards, 1:52.**

**Second quarter**

- CLE – Amari Cooper 75-yard pass from Joe Flacco (Dustin Hopkins kick), 12:04. Browns 14–0. **Drive: 3 plays, 90 yards, 1:32.**
- HOU – Dameon Pierce 98-yard kickoff return (Kaʻimi Fairbairn kick), 11:51. Browns 14–7.
- CLE – David Njoku 21-yard pass from Joe Flacco (Dorian Thompson-Robinson run), 4:16. Browns 22–7. **Drive: 6 plays, 50 yards, 2:51.**

**Third quarter**

- CLE – Amari Cooper 7-yard pass from Joe Flacco (run failed), 2:35. Browns 28–7. **Drive: 18 plays, 94 yards, 9:39.**

**Fourth quarter**

- CLE – Kareem Hunt 1-yard run (Joe Flacco-Amari Cooper pass), 12:31. Browns 36–7. **Drive: 10 plays, 51 yards, 4:06.**
- HOU – Nico Collins 5-yard pass from Davis Mills (Davis Mills-Nico Collins pass), 6:08. Browns 36–15. **Drive: 10 plays, 61 yards, 1:58.**
- HOU – Andrew Beck 1-yard pass from Davis Mills (Kaʻimi Fairbairn kick), 4:12. Browns 36–22. **Drive: 9 plays, 53 yards, 1:56.**

**Top passers**

- CLE – Joe Flacco – 27/42, 368 yards, 3 TD, 2 INT
- HOU – Davis Mills – 15/32, 149 yards, 2 TD

**Top rushers**

- CLE – Jerome Ford – 15 rushes, 25 yards, TD
- HOU – Devin Singletary – 9 rushes, 44 yards

**Top receivers**

- CLE – Amari Cooper – 11 receptions, 265 yards, 2 TD
- HOU – Dalton Schultz – 8 receptions, 61 yards

==== Week 17: vs. Tennessee Titans ====
Week 17: Tennessee Titans at Houston Texans – Game summary

Quarter	1	2	3	4	Total
Titans	0	3	0	0	**3**
**Texans**	3	17	3	3	**26**

at NRG Stadium, Houston, Texas

- Date: December 31
- Game time: 12:00 p.m. CST
- Game weather: None (retractable roof closed)
- Game attendance: 71,517
- Referee: Scott Novak
- TV announcers (Fox): Chris Myers, Robert Smith and Jen Hale
- Recap, Game Book

Game information

**First quarter**

- HOU – Kaʻimi Fairbairn 28-yard field goal, 7:17. Texans 3–0. **Drive: 13 plays, 58 yards, 6:47.**

**Second quarter**

- HOU – Brevin Jordan 12-yard pass from C. J. Stroud (Kaʻimi Fairbairn kick), 10:10. Texans 10–0. **Drive: 13 plays, 94 yards, 7:30.**
- HOU – Sheldon Rankins 13-yard fumble return (Kaʻimi Fairbairn kick), 10:02. Texans 17–0.
- HOU – Kaʻimi Fairbairn 38-yard field goal, 4:17. Texans 20–0. **Drive: 7 plays, 44 yards, 2:58.**
- TEN – Nick Folk 53-yard field goal, 0:00. Texans 20–3. **Drive: 6 plays, 43 yards, 1:11.**

**Third quarter**

- HOU – Kaʻimi Fairbairn 27-yard field goal, 9:35. Texans 23–3. **Drive: 12 plays, 71 yards, 5:25.**

**Fourth quarter**

- HOU – Kaʻimi Fairbairn 51-yard field goal, 5:33. Texans 26–3. **Drive: 4 plays, 2 yards, 2:03.**

**Top passers**

- TEN – Ryan Tannehill – 16/20, 168 yards
- HOU – C. J. Stroud – 24/32, 213 yards, TD

**Top rushers**

- TEN – Derrick Henry – 12 rushes, 42 yards
- HOU – Devin Singletary – 16 rushes, 80 yards

**Top receivers**

- TEN – DeAndre Hopkins – 7 receptions, 72 yards
- HOU – Nico Collins – 7 receptions, 80 yards

==== Week 18: at Indianapolis Colts ====
Week 18: Houston Texans at Indianapolis Colts – Game summary

Quarter	1	2	3	4	Total
**Texans**	7	7	3	6	**23**
Colts	3	3	8	5	**19**

at Lucas Oil Stadium, Indianapolis, Indiana

- Date: January 6
- Game time: 8:15 p.m. EST/7:15 p.m. CST
- Game weather: None (retractable roof closed)
- Game attendance: 65,925
- Referee: Bill Vinovich
- TV announcers (ESPN/ABC/ESPN+): Joe Buck, Troy Aikman and Lisa Salters
- Recap, Game Book

Game information

**First quarter**

- IND – Matt Gay 38-yard field goal, 9:15. Colts 3–0. **Drive: 11 plays, 56 yards, 5:45.**
- HOU – Nico Collins 75-yard pass from C. J. Stroud (Kaʻimi Fairbairn kick), 9:06. Texans 7–3. **Drive: 1 play, 75 yards, 0:09.**

**Second quarter**

- HOU – Andrew Beck 1-yard pass from C. J. Stroud (Kaʻimi Fairbairn kick), 1:57. Texans 14–3. **Drive: 8 plays, 57 yards, 4:26.**
- IND – Matt Gay 52-yard field goal, 0:35. Texans 14–6. **Drive: 6 plays, 41 yards, 1:22.**

**Third quarter**

- IND – Jonathan Taylor 49-yard run (Gardner Minshew–Mo Alie-Cox pass), 9:56. Tied 14–14. **Drive: 4 plays, 87 yards, 1:50.**
- HOU – Kaʻimi Fairbairn 51-yard field goal, 3:39. Texans 17–14. **Drive: 5 plays, 20 yards, 1:58.**

**Fourth quarter**

- IND – Matt Gay 35-yard field goal, 13:33. Tied 17–17. **Drive: 10 plays, 59 yards, 5:06.**
- HOU – Devin Singletary 3-yard run (kick failed), 6:20. Texans 23–17. **Drive: 12 plays, 73 yards, 7:13.**
- IND – Cameron Johnston run out of end zone for a safety, 0:01. Texans 23–19.

**Top passers**

- HOU – C. J. Stroud – 20/26, 264 yards, 2 TD
- IND – Gardner Minshew – 13/24, 141 yards

**Top rushers**

- HOU – Devin Singletary – 24 rushes, 63 yards, TD
- IND – Jonathan Taylor – 30 rushes, 188 yards, TD

**Top receivers**

- HOU – Nico Collins – 9 receptions, 195 yards, TD
- IND – Josh Downs – 3 receptions, 48 yards

Down 6, the Colts drove the ball to the Houston 15 yard line before failing to convert on 4th and 1 with 1:06 remaining thus sealing the game for the Texans. With the win, the Texans clinched a playoff berth for the first time since 2019 and finished the regular season with a record of 10–7. The 10 wins also broke the franchise record for most wins in a season by a first-year head coach. The following day, the Jacksonville Jaguars lost to the Tennessee Titans; as a result of the Jaguars' loss, the Texans won the AFC South.

=== Standings ===
==== Division ====
AFC South
	W	L	T	PCT	DIV	CONF	PF	PA	STK
^{(4)} Houston Texans	10	7	0	.588	4–2	7–5	377	353	W2
Jacksonville Jaguars	9	8	0	.529	4–2	6–6	377	371	L1
Indianapolis Colts	9	8	0	.529	3–3	7–5	396	415	L1
Tennessee Titans	6	11	0	.353	1–5	4–8	305	367	W1

==== Conference ====
AFC
#	Team	Division	W	L	T	PCT	DIV	CONF	SOS	SOV	STK
**Division leaders**
1	Baltimore Ravens	North	13	4	0	.765	3–3	8–4	.543	.529	L1
2 (Note: Buffalo claimed the No. 2 seed over Kansas City based on head-to-head victory.) (Note: Buffalo finished ahead of Miami in the AFC East based on head-to-head sweep.)	Buffalo Bills	East	11	6	0	.647	4–2	7–5	.471	.471	W5
3	Kansas City Chiefs	West	11	6	0	.647	4–2	9–3	.481	.428	W2
4	Houston Texans	South	10	7	0	.588	4–2	7–5	.474	.465	W2
**Wild cards**
5 (Note: Cleveland claimed the No. 5 seed over Miami based on conference record.)	Cleveland Browns	North	11	6	0	.647	3–3	8–4	.536	.513	L1
6	Miami Dolphins	East	11	6	0	.647	4–2	7–5	.450	.358	L2
7	Pittsburgh Steelers	North	10	7	0	.588	5–1	7–5	.540	.571	W3
**Did not qualify for the postseason**
8 (Note: Cincinnati finished ahead of Jacksonville based on head-to-head victory. Division tie break was initially used to eliminate Indianapolis (see below).)	Cincinnati Bengals	North	9	8	0	.529	1–5	4–8	.574	.536	W1
9 (Note: Jacksonville finished ahead of Indianapolis based on head-to-head sweep.)	Jacksonville Jaguars	South	9	8	0	.529	4–2	6–6	.533	.477	L1
10	Indianapolis Colts	South	9	8	0	.529	3–3	7–5	.491	.444	L1
11 (Note: Las Vegas finished ahead of Denver based on head-to-head sweep.)	Las Vegas Raiders	West	8	9	0	.471	4–2	6–6	.488	.426	W1
12	Denver Broncos	West	8	9	0	.471	3–3	5–7	.488	.485	L1
13	New York Jets	East	7	10	0	.412	2–4	4–8	.502	.454	W1
14	Tennessee Titans	South	6	11	0	.353	1–5	4–8	.522	.422	W1
15	Los Angeles Chargers	West	5	12	0	.294	1–5	3–9	.529	.388	L5
16	New England Patriots	East	4	13	0	.235	2–4	4–8	.522	.529	L2
**Tiebreakers** (Note: When breaking ties for three or more teams under the NFL's rules, they are first broken within divisions, then comparing only the highest ranked remaining team from each division.)

== Postseason ==
=== Schedule ===
Round	Date	Opponent (seed)	Result	Record	Venue	Recap
Wild Card	January 13	Cleveland Browns (5)	W 45–14	1–0	NRG Stadium	Recap
Divisional	January 20	at Baltimore Ravens (1)	L 10–34	1–1	M&T Bank Stadium	Recap

=== Game summaries ===
==== AFC Wild Card Playoffs: vs. (5) Cleveland Browns ====
AFC Wild Card Playoffs: (5) Cleveland Browns at (4) Houston Texans – Game Summary

Quarter	1	2	3	4	Total
Browns	7	7	0	0	14
Texans	10	14	14	7	45

at NRG Stadium, Houston, Texas

- Date: January 13, 2024
- Game time: 3:35 p.m. CST
- Game weather: None (retractable roof closed)
- Game attendance: 71,946
- Referee: Clay Martin
- TV announcers (NBC): Noah Eagle, Todd Blackledge and Kathryn Tappen
- Recap, Game Book

Game information

First quarter

- HOU – Kaʻimi Fairbairn 21-yard field goal, 5:29. Texans 3–0. Drive: 7 plays, 43 yards, 2:54.
- CLE – Kareem Hunt 1-yard run (Riley Patterson kick), 2:09. Browns 7–3. Drive: 6 plays, 75 yards, 3:20.
- HOU – Nico Collins 15-yard pass from C. J. Stroud (Kaʻimi Fairbairn kick), 0:11. Texans 10–7. Drive: 4 plays, 75 yards, 1:58.

Second quarter

- CLE – Kareem Hunt 11-yard pass from Joe Flacco (Riley Patterson kick), 12:18. Browns 14–10. Drive: 6 plays, 75 yards, 2:53.
- HOU – Brevin Jordan 76-yard pass from C. J. Stroud (Kaʻimi Fairbairn kick), noon. Texans 17–14. Drive: 1 play, 76 yards, 0:18.
- HOU – Dalton Schultz 37-yard pass from C. J. Stroud (Kaʻimi Fairbairn kick), 1:11. Texans 24–14. Drive: 8 plays, 71 yards, 4:33.

Third quarter

- HOU – Steven Nelson 82-yard interception return (Kaʻimi Fairbairn kick), 6:05. Texans 31–14.
- HOU – Christian Harris 36-yard interception return (Kaʻimi Fairbairn kick), 4:06. Texans 38–14.

Fourth quarter

- HOU – Devin Singletary 19-yard run (Kaʻimi Fairbairn kick), 4:06. Texans 45–14. Drive: 6 plays, 50 yards, 3:00.

Top passers

- CLE – Joe Flacco – 34/46, 307 yards, TD, 2 INT
- HOU – C. J. Stroud – 16/21, 274 yards, 3 TD

Top rushers

- CLE – Kareem Hunt – 8 rushes, 26 yards, TD
- HOU – Devin Singletary – 13 rushes, 66 yards, TD

Top receivers

- CLE – David Njoku – 7 receptions, 93 yards
- HOU – Nico Collins – 6 receptions, 96 yards, TD

This was the first postseason meeting between the Browns and Texans. During the regular season, the Browns defeated the Texans 36–22 in Houston in Week 16. Deshaun Watson, who was the starting quarterback for Cleveland since 2022, suffered a season-ending injury in Week 10. He was the starting quarterback for Houston from 2017 to 2020.

After a competitive first half that was led by the Texans, they took a commanding lead after the turn of the half, in which Joe Flacco threw back-to-back interceptions that were returned for touchdowns.[24] This was the Texans' first playoff win since the 2019 season.

==== AFC Divisional Playoffs: at (1) Baltimore Ravens ====
AFC Divisional Playoffs: (4) Houston Texans at (1) Baltimore Ravens – Game Summary

Quarter	1	2	3	4	Total
Texans	3	7	0	0	10
Ravens	3	7	7	17	34

at M&T Bank Stadium, Baltimore, Maryland

- Date: January 20, 2024
- Game time: 4:35 p.m. EST/3:35 p.m. CST
- Game weather: Clear, 27 °F (−3 °C)
- Game attendance: 71,018
- Referee: John Hussey
- TV announcers (ABC/ESPN/ESPN+): Joe Buck, Troy Aikman, Lisa Salters and Laura Rutledge
- Recap, Game Book

Game information

First quarter

- BAL – Justin Tucker 53-yard field goal, 8:36. Ravens 3–0. Drive: 9 plays, 41 yards, 5:55.
- HOU – Kaʻimi Fairbairn 50-yard field goal, 0:28. Tied 3–3. Drive: 8 plays, 23 yards, 2:54.

Second quarter

- BAL – Nelson Agholor 3-yard pass from Lamar Jackson (Justin Tucker kick), 9:14. Ravens 10–3. Drive: 11 plays, 76 yards, 6:14.
- HOU – Steven Sims 67-yard punt return, 4:17. Tied 10–10.

Third quarter

- BAL – Lamar Jackson 15-yard run (Justin Tucker kick), 12:04. Ravens 17–10. Drive: 6 plays, 55 yards, 2:56.

Fourth quarter

- BAL – Isaiah Likely 15-yard pass from Lamar Jackson (Justin Tucker kick), 14:23. Ravens 24–10. Drive: 12 plays, 93 yards, 7:03.
- BAL – Lamar Jackson 8-yard run (Justin Tucker kick), 6:20. Ravens 31–10. Drive: 11 plays, 78 yards, 7:10.
- BAL – Justin Tucker 43-yard field goal, 1:56. Ravens 34–10. Drive: 8 plays, 8 yards, 3:08.

Top passers

- HOU – C. J. Stroud – 18/32, 165 yards
- BAL – Lamar Jackson – 16/22, 152 yards, 2 TD

Top rushers

- HOU – Devin Singletary – 9 rushes, 22 yards
- BAL – Lamar Jackson – 11 rushes, 100 yards, 2 TD

Top receivers

- HOU – Nico Collins – 4 receptions, 58 yards
- BAL – Zay Flowers – 4 receptions, 41 yards

Despite keeping up with Baltimore in the first half, the Texans failed to score any points in the second half in the blowout loss. With this loss, the Texans remain winless in the Divisional Round and road playoff games, being 0–5, along with remaining winless at M&T Bank Stadium, being 0–8. This was the second postseason meeting between the Ravens and Texans. The Ravens won the first matchup, the 2011 AFC Divisional Game, by a score of 20–13 in Baltimore. In the regular season, the Ravens defeated the Texans by a score of 25–9 in Baltimore in Week 1. Despite a ragged offensive start in the first half, the Ravens outscored the Texans 24–0 in the second half and advanced to their first AFC Championship game since 2012 with a 34–10 rout.

Though not getting a takeaway nor recording a sack on rookie quarterback C. J. Stroud, the Ravens defense dominated Houston. They did not allow any offensive plays by Houston inside the Ravens' 25-yard line nor gave up an offensive touchdown. Houston's only points came by a field goal and a punt return touchdown in the first half. The Baltimore crowd noise also caused a litany of Houston pre-snap penalties.[44]

Lamar Jackson had two passing touchdowns and two rushing touchdowns as he improved to 2–3 in playoff games and 1–2 in home playoff games. This was also the Ravens' first home playoff win since the 2012 AFC Wild Card round.

== Statistics ==
=== Team ===
Category	Total yards	Yards per game	NFL rank (out of 32)
Passing offense	4,173	245.5	7th
Rushing offense	1,647	96.9	23rd
Total offense	5,820	342.4	12th
Passing defense	3,979	234.1	23rd
Rushing defense	1,643	96.6	6th
Total defense	5,622	330.7	14th

=== Individual ===
Category	Player	Total
Offense
Passing yards	C. J. Stroud	4,108
Passing touchdowns	C. J. Stroud	23
Rushing yards	Devin Singletary	898
Rushing touchdowns	Devin Singletary	4
Receiving yards	Nico Collins	1,297
Receiving touchdowns	Nico Collins	8
Defense
Tackles (Solo)	Christian Harris	65
Sacks	Jonathan Greenard	12.5
Interceptions	Derek Stingley Jr.	5
