= Christian Harris =

American football player (born 2001)

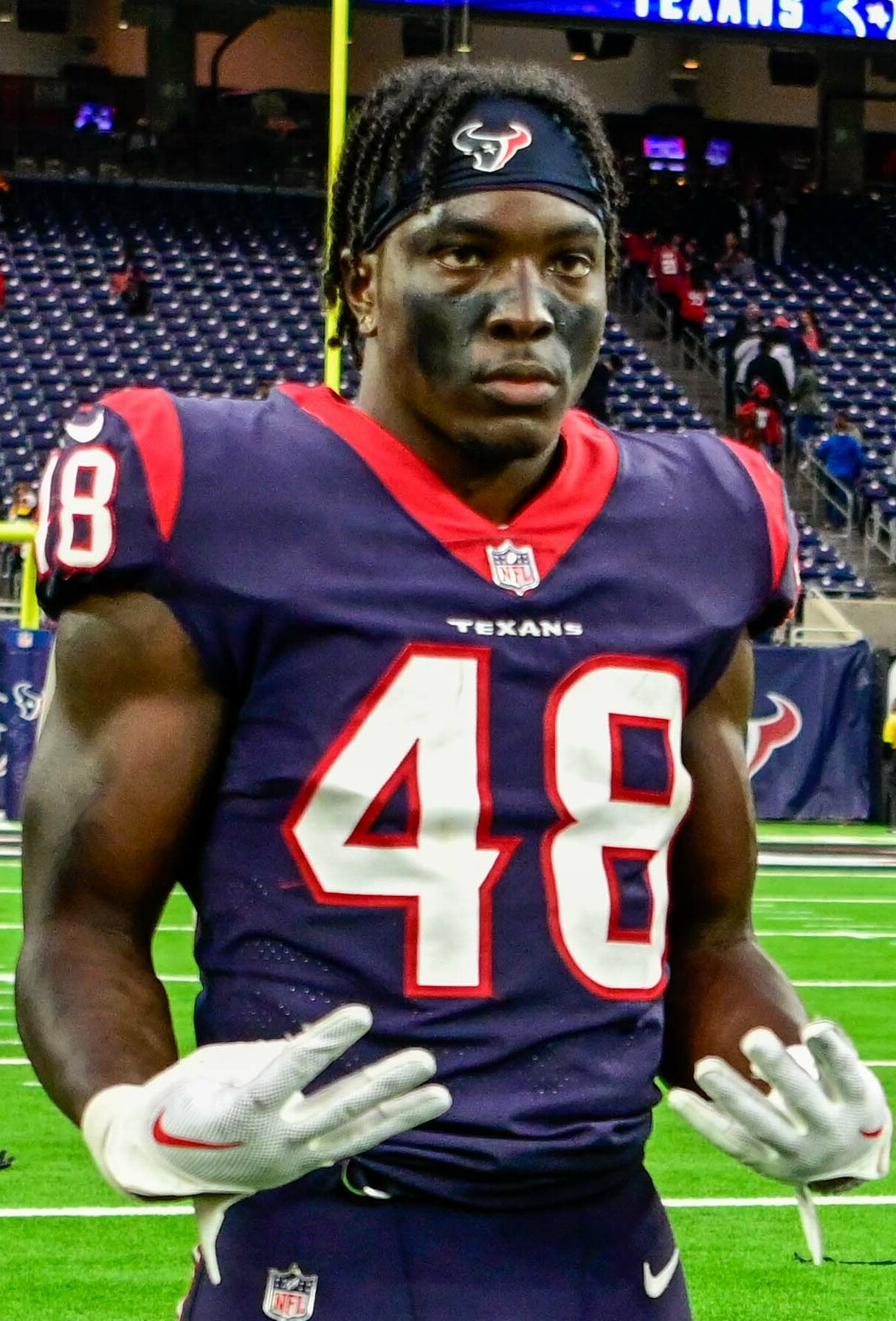
- Harris with the Houston Texans in 2022

No. 45 – Atlanta Falcons
- Position: Linebacker
- Roster status: Active

Personal information
- Born: January 16, 2001 (age 25); Baton Rouge, Louisiana, U.S.
- Listed height: 6 ft 1 in (1.85 m)
- Listed weight: 226 lb (103 kg)

Career information
- High school: U-High (Baton Rouge)
- College: Alabama (2019–2021)
- NFL draft: 2022: 3rd round, 75th overall pick

Career history
- Houston Texans (2022–2025); Atlanta Falcons (2026–present)

Awards and highlights
- CFP national champion (2020)

Career NFL statistics as of Week 10, 2026
- Total tackles: 210
- Sacks: 4.0
- Forced fumbles: 2
- Interceptions: 1
- Pass deflections: 13
- Stats at Pro Football Reference

Christian Harris (born January 16, 2001) is an American professional football linebacker for the Atlanta Falcons of the National Football League (NFL). He played college football for the Alabama Crimson Tide and was selected by the Houston Texans in the third round of the 2022 NFL draft.

== Early life ==
Harris attended Louisiana State University Laboratory School in Baton Rouge, Louisiana. He played several positions in high school, including running back, wide receiver, tight end, and cornerback. He converted to linebacker in the 2019 All-American Bowl. A 4-star linebacker recruit, Harris originally committed to play college football at Texas A&M University before flipping his commitment to the University of Alabama.

== College career ==
Harris entered his true freshman year at Alabama in 2019 as a linebacker, despite not playing the position in high school. He opened the season as a starter, starting 12 of 13 games, recording 63 tackles and being named freshman All-Southeastern Conference. Harris returned as a starter his sophomore year in 2020. On January 17, 2022, Harris declared his intentions to enter the 2022 NFL draft.

== Professional career ==
Pre-draft measurables
Height	Weight	Arm length	Hand span	Wingspan	40-yard dash	10-yard split	20-yard split	Vertical jump	Broad jump
6 ft 0 1/2 in (1.84 m)	226 lb (103 kg)	32 1/8 in (0.82 m)	9 5/8 in (0.24 m)	6 ft 4 3/4 in (1.95 m)	4.44 s	1.54 s	2.57 s	34.5 in (0.88 m)	11 ft 0 in (3.35 m)
All values from NFL Combine

=== Houston Texans ===
==== 2022 ====
Harris was selected in the third round (75th overall) by the Houston Texans in the 2022 NFL draft. He was placed on injured reserve on September 1, 2022. He was activated on October 22.

==== 2023 ====
On January 13, 2024, in the Wild Card Round against the Cleveland Browns, Harris returned a Joe Flacco interception for a 36-yard touchdown, and he later sacked Flacco on fourth down of the next drive. It was the first time that a player had a sack and a pick-six in a playoff game since fellow Texan J. J. Watt did the same in the 2011 Wild Card Round against Andy Dalton and the Cincinnati Bengals.

==== 2024 ====
On August 27, 2024, Harris was placed on injured reserve. He was activated on December 14.

=== Atlanta Falcons ===
On March 12, 2026, Harris signed with the Atlanta Falcons.

== Career statistics ==
=== NFL ===
Legend
**Bold**	Career high

==== Regular season ====
Year	Team	Games		Tackles				Interceptions				Fumbles		
Year	Team	GP	GS	Cmb	Solo	Ast	Sck	Int	Yds	TD	PD	FF	FR	TD
2022	HOU	12	11	74	46	28	1.0	**1**	**20**	0	5	**1**	0	0
2023	HOU	**16**	**12**	**101**	**65**	**36**	**2.0**	0	0	0	**7**	**1**	0	0
2024	HOU	3	3	20	13	7	1.0	0	0	0	0	0	0	0
2025	HOU	15	1	11	5	6	0.0	0	0	0	1	0	0	0
2026	ATL	7	0	4	2	2	0.0	0	0	0	0	0	0	0
Career		53	27	210	131	79	4.0	1	20	0	13	2	0	0

==== Playoffs ====
Year	Team	Games		Tackles				Interceptions				Fumbles		
Year	Team	GP	GS	Cmb	Solo	Ast	Sck	Int	Yds	TD	PD	FF	FR	TD
2023	HOU	**2**	**2**	**15**	**13**	**2**	**1.0**	**1**	**36**	**1**	**1**	0	0	0
2024	HOU	**2**	1	1	1	0	0.0	0	0	0	0	0	0	0
Career		4	3	16	14	2	1.0	1	36	1	1	0	0	0

=== College ===
Year	Team	GP	Tackles				Interceptions					Fumbles	
Year	Team	GP	Cmb	Solo	Ast	Sck	Int	Yds	Avg	TD	PD	FF	FR
2019	Alabama	13	61	27	34	0.0	0	0	0.0	0	1	0	1
2020	Alabama	13	79	52	27	4.5	1	0	0.0	0	2	0	0
2021	Alabama	15	80	45	35	5.5	0	0	0.0	0	3	2	0
Career		41	220	124	96	10.0	1	0	0.0	0	6	2	1
