= Derek Stingley Jr. =

American football player (born 2001)

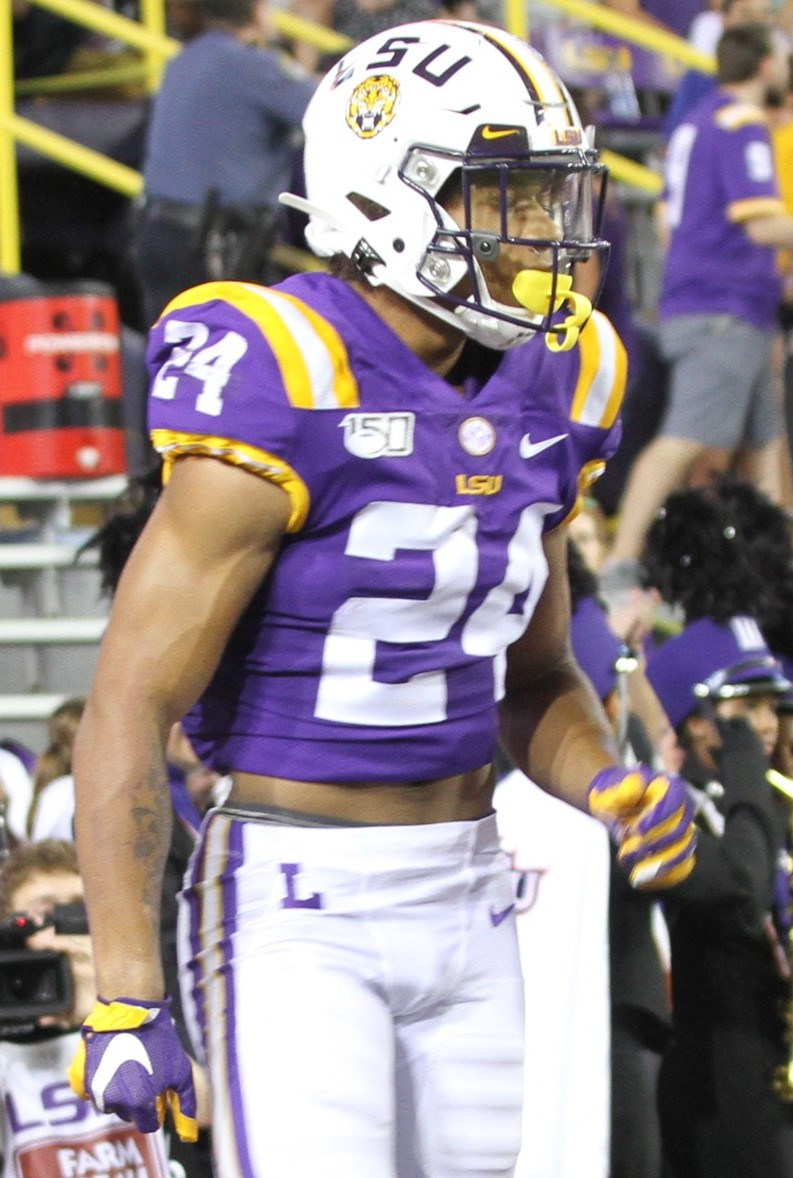
- Stingley with the LSU Tigers in 2019

No. 24 – Houston Texans
- Position: Cornerback
- Roster status: Active

Personal information
- Born: June 20, 2001 (age 25); Baton Rouge, Louisiana, U.S.
- Listed height: 6 ft 1 in (1.85 m)
- Listed weight: 195 lb (88 kg)

Career information
- High school: The Dunham School (Baton Rouge)
- College: LSU (2019–2021)
- NFL draft: 2022: 1st round, 3rd overall pick

Career history
- Houston Texans (2022–present)

Awards and highlights
- 2× First-team All-Pro (2024, 2025); 2× Pro Bowl (2024, 2025); CFP national champion (2019); Consensus All-American (2019); First-team All-American (2020); 2× First-team All-SEC (2019, 2020)

Career NFL statistics as of 2025
- Total tackles: 172
- Sacks: 1
- Forced fumbles: 1
- Pass deflections: 51
- Interceptions: 15
- Defensive touchdowns: 1
- Stats at Pro Football Reference

Derek Stingley Jr. (born June 20, 2001) is an American professional football cornerback for the Houston Texans of the National Football League (NFL). He played college football for the LSU Tigers and was selected by the Texans third overall in the 2022 NFL draft.

== Early life ==
Stingley Jr. attended The Dunham School in Baton Rouge, Louisiana. During his high school career he had 27 career interceptions. As a senior, he was named the Louisiana Gatorade Football Player of the Year. Stingley Jr. was rated as a five-star recruit and was ranked as the top overall player in his class by Rivals.com. He committed to Louisiana State University (LSU) to play college football.

== College career ==
Stingley Jr. entered his freshman year at LSU in 2019 as a starter, helping the team go undefeated and win the College Football National Championship. As a freshman, he led the Southeastern Conference (SEC) with six interceptions, 21 passes defended and was a first-team All-SEC selection by the Associated Press (AP). He was also a consensus All-American, earning first-team honors from the AP, American Football Coaches Association, The Sporting News, Sports Illustrated, ESPN, and USA Today. In the following season, Stingley missed three games due to illness and injuries, but still was named to the All-SEC first-team. Following an injury plagued junior season in which he was only able to start in three games, Stingley declared for the 2022 NFL draft.

== Professional career ==
=== Pre-draft ===
He attended the NFL Scouting Combine, but was unable to perform any physical drills or exercises as he was still in the midst of recovering from undergoing surgery on his foot for a Lisfranc fracture. Michael Renner of Pro Football Focus ranked Stingley as the top cornerback (2nd overall) on his big board. Cory Giddings of Bleacher Report ranked him as the top cornerback prospect (4th overall) available in the draft. Kevin Hanson of Sports Illustrated had him as the second best cornerback available in the draft. NFL analysts Daniel Jeremiah and Bucky Brooks and Dane Brugler of the Athletic ranked Stingley as the third best cornerback prospect in the draft. ESPN analyst Mel Kiper Jr. had him ranked second among all cornerbacks in the draft. NFL draft analysts and scouts unanimously projected him to be selected in the first round of the draft.

External videos
- Derek Stingley Jr. College Highlights
- Stingley is 'most talented corner in draft'

Pre-draft measurables
Height	Weight	Arm length	Hand span	Wingspan	40-yard dash	10-yard split	20-yard split	20-yard shuttle	Three-cone drill	Vertical jump	Broad jump
6 ft 0 1/4 in (1.84 m)	190 lb (86 kg)	30 5/8 in (0.78 m)	9 5/8 in (0.24 m)	6 ft 2 1/8 in (1.88 m)	4.38 s	1.56 s	2.51 s	4.19 s	7.00 s	38.5 in (0.98 m)	10 ft 2 in (3.10 m)
All values from NFL Combine/Pro Day

=== 2022 ===
The Houston Texans selected Stingley Jr. in the first round (third overall) of the 2022 NFL draft. With his selection at third overall, he tied with Shawn Springs (1997) and Jeff Okudah (2020) to be the highest drafted cornerbacks in NFL history. He also became the highest drafted cornerback in the Houston Texans' franchise history, surpassing former 2004 first-round pick (10th overall) Dunta Robinson (2004). The Texans drafted Stingley following the departures of Terrance Mitchell and Vernon Hargreaves III.

External videos
- Texans select Derek Stingley Jr. No. 3
- Derek Stingley Jr. Press Conference

On May 13, 2022, the Houston Texans signed Stingley Jr. to a fully-guaranteed four–year, $34.65 million rookie contract that included an initial signing bonus of $22.85 million.

He entered training camp projected as the No. 1 starting cornerback with his only competitors being Steven Nelson and Desmond King. Head coach Lovie Smith named him a starting cornerback to begin the season, alongside Steven Nelson.

On September 11, 2022, Stingley made his professional regular season debut and earned his first career start in the Houston Texans' home-opener against the Indianapolis Colts and made seven combined tackles (three solo) and had a pass deflection during their overtime 20–20 tie. The following week, he set a season-high with eight solo tackles and two pass deflections during a 9–16 loss at the Denver Broncos in week 2. In week 3, he had three solo tackles and made his first career sack on quarterback Justin Fields as the Texans lost 20-23 at the Chicago Bears. On October 9, 2022, Stingley made seven combined tackles (six solo), two pass deflections, and had his first career interception on a pass thrown by Trevor Lawrence to wide receiver Zay Jones during a 13–6 victory at the Jacksonville Jaguars. In week 10, Stingley had two solo tackles before exiting during the fourth quarter of a 16–24 loss at the New York Giants after injuring his ankle. On December 17, 2022, the Texans officially placed him on injured reserve due to a hamstring injury and a high-ankle sprain and he remained inactive for the remaining eight games of the season (Weeks 11–18). He finished his rookie season in 2022 with a total of 43 combined tackles (35 solo), five passes defensed, one sack, and one interception in nine games and nine starts. Stingley did not allow a touchdown reception throughout the nine games he appeared in during his rookie season. On January 8, 2023, the Houston Texans fired head coach Lovie Smith after finishing the 2022 NFL season with a 3–13–1. He received an overall grade of 49.9 from Pro Football Focus in 2022.

=== 2023 ===
On January 31, 2023, the Houston Texans hired former San Francisco 49ers' defensive coordinator DeMeco Ryans to be their head coach. He entered training camp slated as the de facto No. 1 starting cornerback under new defensive coordinator Matt Burke. He was named a starting cornerback to begin the season and was paired with Steven Nelson with Shaquill Griffin as the primary backup.

On September 23, 2023, the Texans placed him on injured reserve after he sustained a hamstring injury during practice. On November 11, 2023, the Texans activated him from injured reserve and added him back to their active roster after he was inactive for six consecutive games (Weeks 3–8). In week 11, he set a season-high with six combined tackles (three solo), made one pass deflection, and intercepted a pass by Kyler Murray to wide receiver Marquise Brown as the Texans defeated the Arizona Cardinals 21–16. The following week, he had five combined tackles (four solo), two pass deflections, and had his second consecutive game with an interception after picking off a pass by Trevor Lawrence to tight end Evan Engram during a 21–24 loss against the Jacksonville Jaguars in week 12. On November 3, 2023, Stingley made one solo tackle, set a season-high with four pass deflections, and had a career-high two interceptions off passes thrown by Russell Wilson as the Texans defeated the Denver Broncos 22–17. His performance in week 13 earned him AFC Defensive Player of the Week honors. On December 24, 2023, Stingley recorded three combined tackles (two solo), had two pass deflections, and set a new career-high with his fifth interception of the season on a pass attempt by Joe Flacco to wide receiver Amari Cooper during a 22–36 loss to the Cleveland Browns. He finished the season with 39 combined tackles (28 solo), 13 pass deflections, and a career-high five interceptions in 11 games and 11 starts. He received an overall grade of 82.1 from Pro Football Focus in 2023.

The Houston Texans finished the 2023 NFL season first in the AFC South with a 10–7 record, clinching a playoff berth in their first season under DeMeco Ryans. On January 13, 2024, Stingley started in the first playoff game of his career and had two solo tackles and a pass deflection during a 45–14 win against the Cleveland Browns in the AFC Wild-Card Game. The following week, he had three combined tackles (two solo) in the Texans' 10–34 loss at the Baltimore Ravens in the Divisional Round.

=== 2024 ===
He returned to training camp as the No. 1 starting cornerback and led a new group of cornerbacks, including Kamari Lassiter, C. J. Henderson, Jeff Okudah, Myles Bryant, Mike Ford, and Lonnie Johnson Jr. Head coach DeMeco Ryans named Stingley and rookie Kamari Lassiter as the starting cornerbacks to begin the season.

In week 5, he set a season-high with seven combined tackles (four solo) and had a pass deflection during a 23–20 victory against the Buffalo Bills. In week 13, Stingley made two combined tackles (one solo), set a season-high with three pass deflections, and intercepted a pass by Trevor Lawrence to wide receiver Brian Thomas Jr. during a 23–20 victory at the Jacksonville Jaguars. On December 15, 2024, Stingley made five combined tackles (three solo), two pass deflections, and set a season-high with two interceptions on passes by Tua Tagovailoa as the Texans defeated the Miami Dolphins 12–20. He earned the AFC Defensive Player of the Week for his performance in week 15. He started all 17 games for the first time in his career and had a total of 54 combined tackles (37 solo), a career-high 18 pass deflections, and five interceptions. He earned Pro Bowl and First-Team All-Pro honors. He received an overall grade of 73.9 from Pro Football Focus, which ranked 30th among 222 qualifying cornerbacks in 2024.

The Houston Texans finished the 2024 NFL season atop the AFC South with a 10–7 record to clinch a playoff berth. On January 11, 2025, Stingley made four solo tackles, five pass deflections (led the game), and two interceptions (led the game) off passes thrown by Justin Herbert during a 32–12 victory against the Los Angeles Chargers in the Wild-Card Game. The following week, he was limited to three solo tackles as the Texans were defeated at the Kansas City Chiefs 14–23 in the Divisional Round. He was ranked 18th by his fellow players on the NFL Top 100 Players of 2025.

=== 2025 ===
On March 17, 2025, the Texans signed Stingley to a three–year, $90 million contract extension that includes $89.2 million guaranteed, $48.2 million guaranteed upon signing, and an initial signing bonus of $25 million. This contract deal made him the highest-paid cornerback in NFL history.

In Week 16, Stingley returned an interception for a 31-yard touchdown in a 23-21 win over the Las Vegas Raiders, earning AFC Defensive Player of the Week. In the 2025 season, he had 36 total tackles (26 solo), four interceptions, and 15 passes defended.

Stingley was named as a Pro Bowler and earned first team All-Pro honors for the second time.

== Career statistics ==
Legend
	Led the league
**Bold**	Career high

=== NFL ===
==== Regular season ====
Year	Team	Games		Tackles					Interceptions						Fumbles			
Year	Team	GP	GS	Cmb	Solo	Ast	TFL	Sck	PD	Int	Yds	Avg	Lng	TD	FF	FR	Yds	TD
2022	HOU	9	9	43	35	8	0	**1.0**	5	1	9	9.0	9	0	0	0	0	0
2023	HOU	11	11	39	28	11	1	0.0	13	**5**	17	3.4	14	0	0	0	0	0
2024	HOU	17	17	**54**	**37**	**17**	**4**	0.0	**18**	**5**	48	9.6	**31**	0	0	0	0	0
2025	HOU	17	17	36	26	10	1	0.0	15	4	**68**	**17.0**	**31**	**1**	**1**	0	0	0
Career		54	54	172	126	46	6	1.0	51	15	142	9.5	31	1	1	0	0	0

==== Postseason ====
Year	Team	Games		Tackles					Interceptions						Fumbles			
Year	Team	GP	GS	Cmb	Solo	Ast	TFL	Sck	PD	Int	Yds	Avg	Lng	TD	FF	FR	Yds	TD
2023	HOU	2	2	5	4	**1**	**1**	0.0	1	0	0	–	0	0	0	0	0	0
2024	HOU	2	2	**7**	**7**	0	0	0.0	**5**	**2**	**70**	**35.0**	**54**	0	**1**	0	0	0
2025	HOU	2	2	3	3	0	0	0.0	0	0	0	–	0	0	0	0	0	0
Career		6	6	15	14	1	1	0.0	6	2	70	35.0	54	0	1	0	0	0

=== College ===
Season	Team	GP	Tackles					Interceptions					Fumbles			
Season	Team	GP	Cmb	Solo	Ast	TFL	Sck	Int	Yds	Avg	TD	PD	FF	FR	Yds	TD
2019	LSU	15	**38**	**31**	7	1.0	0.0	**6**	**17**	**2.8**	0	**15**	0	**1**	**5**	0
2020	LSU	7	27	19	**8**	2.5	0.0	0	0	0.0	0	5	**1**	**1**	2	0
2021	LSU	3	8	6	2	**3.5**	0.0	0	0	0.0	0	0	**1**	0	0	0
Career		25	73	56	17	7.0	0.0	6	17	3.5	0	20	2	2	7	0

== Personal life ==
His father, Derek Stingley Sr., played in the Arena Football League, and his grandfather, the late Darryl Stingley, played with the New England Patriots in the National Football League.

On October 15, 2025, Stingley got engaged to longtime girlfriend Annabella Campagna. On November 25, 2025, the couple announced they expect to welcome a baby boy sometime in April 2026.
