= Andrew Beck (American football) =

American football player (born 1996)

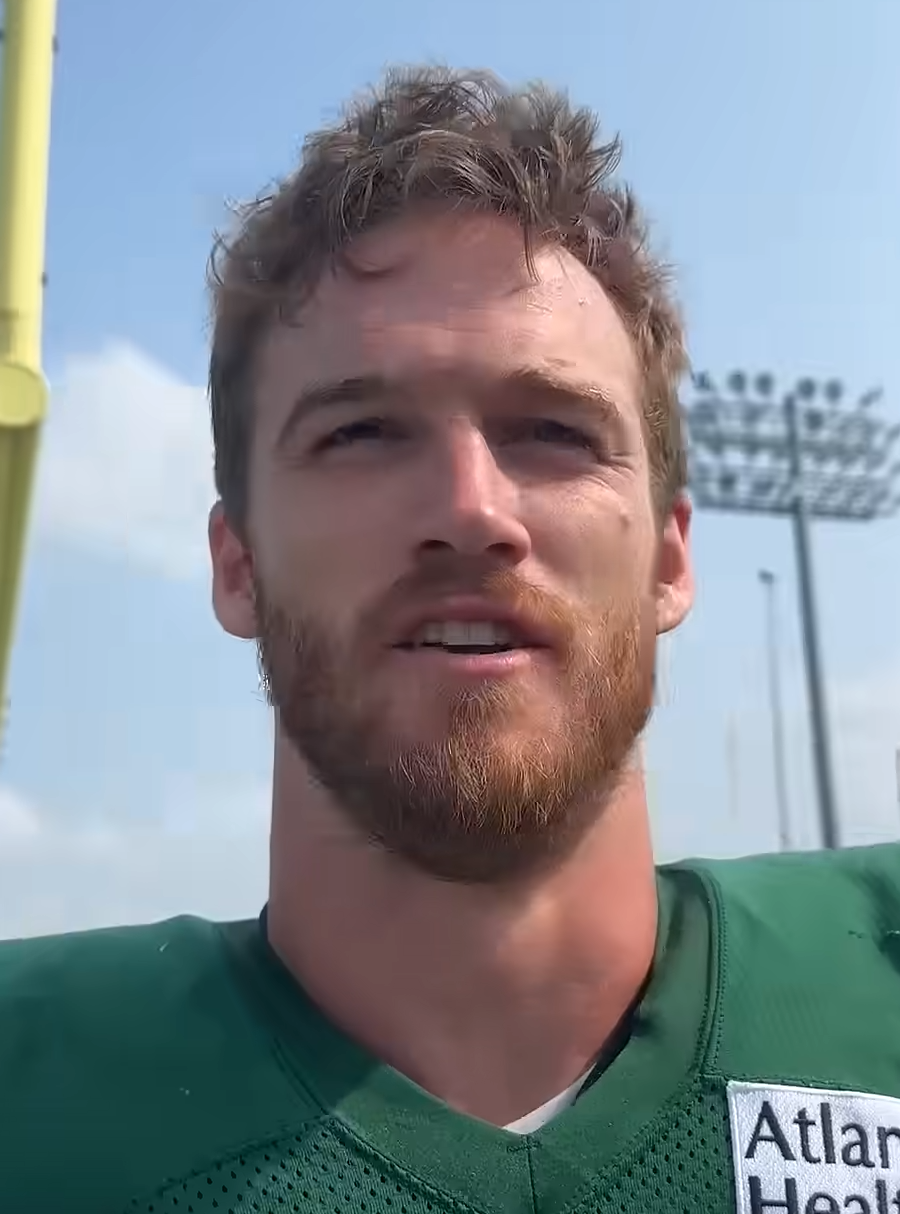
- Beck with the New York Jets in 2025

No. 47 – New York Jets
- Position: Fullback
- Roster status: Active

Personal information
- Born: May 15, 1996 (age 30); Tampa, Florida, U.S.
- Listed height: 6 ft 3 in (1.91 m)
- Listed weight: 255 lb (116 kg)

Career information
- High school: Henry B. Plant (Tampa)
- College: Texas
- NFL draft: 2019: undrafted

Career history
- New England Patriots (2019)*; Denver Broncos (2019–2022); Houston Texans (2023); Green Bay Packers (2024); Houston Texans (2024); New York Jets (2025–present)
- * Offseason or practice squad member only

Awards and highlights
- First-team All-Big 12 (2018)

Career NFL statistics as of Week 5, 2026
- Rushing yards: 12
- Rushing average: 1.1
- Rushing touchdowns: 1
- Receptions: 31
- Receiving yards: 259
- Receiving touchdowns: 5
- Return yards: 94
- Return touchdowns: 1
- Stats at Pro Football Reference

Andrew Beck (born May 15, 1996) is an American professional football fullback for the New York Jets of the National Football League (NFL). He played college football for the Texas Longhorns.

== Early life ==
Beck attended and played high school football at Henry B. Plant High School.

== College career ==
Beck was a member of the Texas Longhorns football team for five seasons. He became a starter at tight end and H-back for the team as a sophomore, catching eight passes for 77 yards while serving primarily as a blocker. In his junior season, Beck caught four passes for 82 yards and two touchdowns while blocking for the nation's leading rusher, D'Onta Foreman. He missed the entirety of his senior season and was forced to use a medical redshirt after breaking his foot in a preseason practice. As a redshirt senior, Beck had 28 receptions for 281 yards and two touchdowns and was named first-team All-Big 12 Conference.

== Professional career ==
Pre-draft measurables
Height	Weight	Arm length	Hand span	Wingspan	40-yard dash	10-yard split	20-yard split	20-yard shuttle	Three-cone drill	Vertical jump	Broad jump	Bench press
6 ft 2 7/8 in (1.90 m)	252 lb (114 kg)	30 1/4 in (0.77 m)	9 1/8 in (0.23 m)	6 ft 3 3/8 in (1.91 m)	4.63 s	1.56 s	2.64 s	4.26 s	7.34 s	34.0 in (0.86 m)	9 ft 11 in (3.02 m)	23 reps
All values from Pro Day

=== New England Patriots ===
Beck signed with the New England Patriots as an undrafted free agent on May 4, 2019, after agreeing to a guaranteed salary of $115,000, making him the highest paid undrafted signing by the team. The Patriots moved Beck to the fullback position at the start of training camp. He was waived during final roster cuts on August 30, 2019.

=== Denver Broncos ===
Beck was claimed off waivers by the Denver Broncos on September 1, 2019, to serve as the team's fullback after an injury to starter Andy Janovich. Beck made his NFL debut in the Broncos season opener of September 9, against the Oakland Raiders. He made his first career start on September 22, 2019, against the Green Bay Packers, playing 23 snaps at fullback. Beck caught a one-yard pass from Drew Lock for his first career touchdown on December 29, 2019, in a 16–15 win over the Raiders. He finished the 2019 season with 9 catches on 12 passes for 90 yards and a TD and 1 rush for 3 yards. He also threw 1 pass for 6 yards.

Beck was placed on the reserve/COVID-19 list by the Broncos on July 30, 2020. He was activated on August 17, 2020. He was placed on injured reserve on October 31 with a hamstring injury. He was activated on December 5, 2020. He played in 10 games that season, but almost entirely on special teams, recording no stats.

On December 21, 2021, Beck was placed on injured reserve. On February 10, 2022, Beck was awarded the NFL's Salute to Service award, presented by USAA annually. In 2012, he played in 12 games, again almost entirely on special teams, recording just one solo tackle.

On March 14, 2022, Beck signed a one-year contract extension with the Broncos. in 2022, he played in 13 games and filled in on offense in several games due to an injury to tight end Greg Dulcich, recording 5 catches on 11 passes for 69 yards, 2 rushes and a tackle. He had his first four career starts that year. At the end of the season he became a free agent.

=== Houston Texans (first stint) ===
On March 17, 2023, Beck signed a two-year contract with the Houston Texans, who moved him from tight end to fullback.

In 2023, he played in 15 games of which he started 12. He had 11 catches on 13 passes for 55 yards and 5 rushes for 3 yards and a touchdown. He also started in both of the Texans playoff games that year.

On September 24, 2023, in a game against the Jacksonville Jaguars, Beck muffed a kickoff, but managed to return it for an 85-yard touchdown. The Texans won the game 37–17.

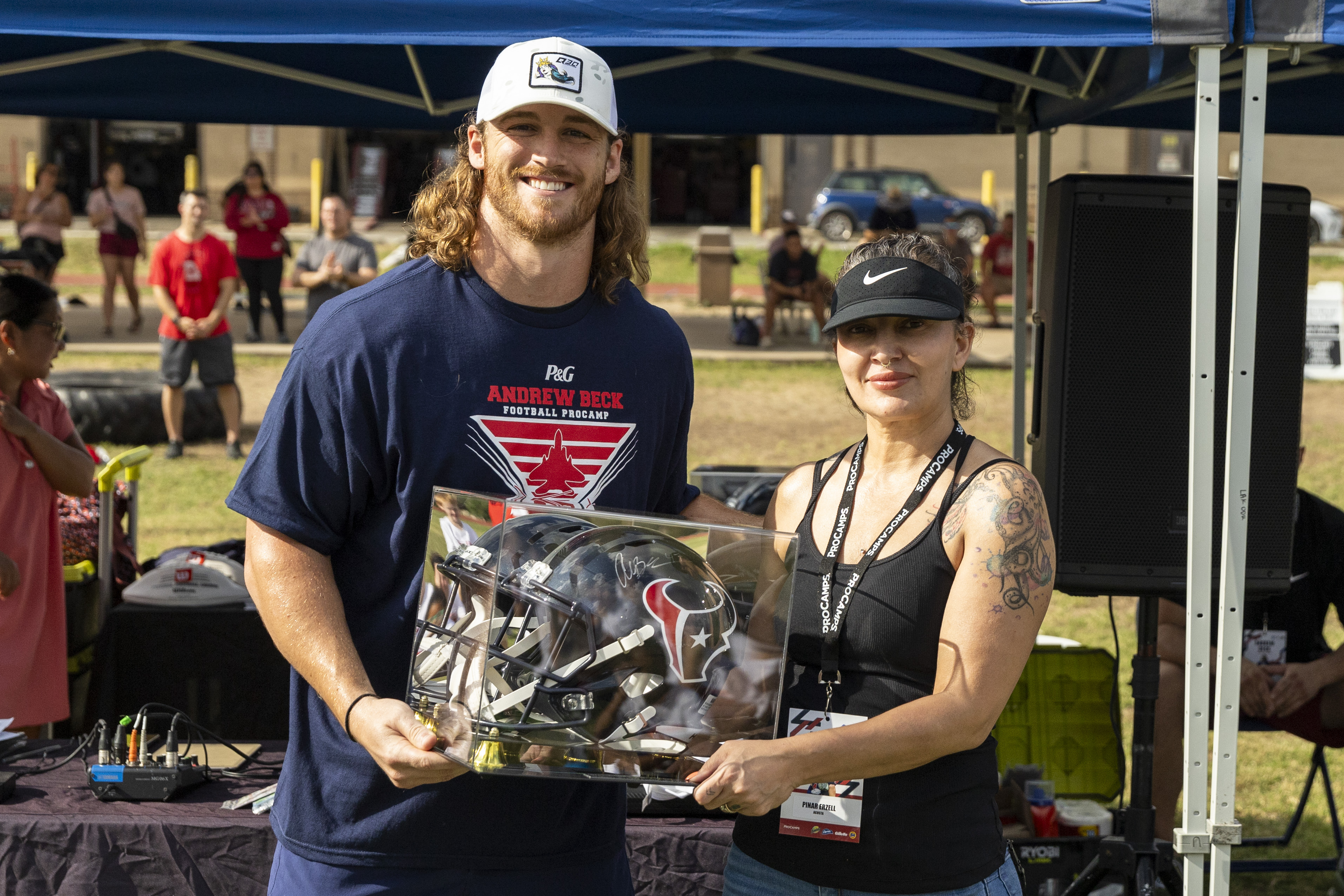
Beck (left) giving away an autographed Texans helmet in 2024

On January 6, 2024, in the final game of the regular season against the Indianapolis Colts, Beck caught a 1-yard touchdown pass from C. J. Stroud. The Texans won the game 23–19, and clinched a playoff berth for the first time since 2019.

Beck was placed on the Active/Physically Unable to Perform (PUP) list on July 18, 2024, and reactivated on July 29.

On August 27, 2024, Beck was released by the Texans when they cut to their initial 53-man roster.

=== Green Bay Packers ===
Beck was signed by the Green Bay Packers to their practice squad on August 30, 2024. In October, he was elevated to the active roster for Weeks 5, 6 and 7. The Packers released Beck from the practice squad on October 22, 2024, because he'd exhausted his special teams call-up allotment. Beck played in three games for the Packers and recorded 15 offensive snaps and 16 special teams snaps. He was targeted once as a receiver.

=== Houston Texans (second stint) ===
On November 28, 2024, Beck was signed to the Houston Texans practice squad. Beck was elevated from the practice squad for one regular season game and played 12 snaps on offense during the game. He was targeted once as a receiver.

=== New York Jets ===
On February 7, 2025, Beck signed with the New York Jets. After playing all 17 games in 2025, he re-signed with the team on March 12, 2026.

In Week 9 of 2026 against the Kansas City Chiefs, Beck served as the kickoff specialist. The Jets had surrendered a kickoff return touchdown the week prior and opted to replace usual kicker Jason Sanders with Beck to have an extra tackler.

== NFL career statistics ==
Legend
	Led the league
**Bold**	Career high

=== Regular season ===
Year	Team	Games		Rushing					Receiving					Kickoff return					Fumbles	
Year	Team	GP	GS	Att	Yds	Avg	Lng	TD	Rec	Yds	Avg	Lng	TD	Ret	Yds	Avg	Lng	TD	Fum	Lost
2019	DEN	16	6	1	3	3.0	3	0	9	**90**	10.0	**29**	1	0	0	0.0	0	0	0	0
2020	DEN	10	0	0	0	0.0	0	0	0	0	0.0	0	0	0	0	0.0	0	0	0	0
2021	DEN	12	0	0	0	0.0	0	0	0	0	0.0	0	0	0	0	0.0	0	0	0	0
2022	DEN	13	4	2	0	0.0	0	0	5	69	**13.8**	27	0	0	0	0.0	0	0	0	0
2023	HOU	15	12	**5**	3	0.6	2	**1**	**11**	55	5.0	26	**2**	**2**	**94**	**47.0**	**85**	**1**	**1**	**1**
2024	GB	3	0	0	0	0.0	0	0	0	0	0.0	0	0	0	0	0.0	0	0	0	0
2024	HOU	1	0	0	0	0.0	0	0	0	0	0.0	0	0	0	0	0.0	0	0	0	0
2025	NYJ	17	2	1	**5**	**5.0**	**5**	0	6	45	7.5	17	**2**	0	0	0.0	0	0	0	0
2026	NYJ	5	0	0	0	0.0	0	0	0	0	0.0	0	0	0	0	0.0	0	0	0	0
Total		92	24	9	11	1.2	5	1	31	259	8.4	29	5	2	94	47.0	85	1	1	1
Source: pro-football-reference.com

=== Postseason ===
Year	Team	Games		Rushing					Receiving					Fumbles	
Year	Team	GP	GS	Att	Yds	Avg	Lng	TD	Rec	Yds	Avg	Lng	TD	Fum	Lost
2023	HOU	2	2	0	0	0.0	0	0	0	0	0.0	0	0	0	0
2024	HOU	1	1	0	0	0.0	0	0	0	0	0.0	0	0	0	0
Total		3	3	0	0	0	0	0	0	0	0.0	0	0	0	0
Source: pro-football-reference.com
