= Henry To'oTo'o =

American football player (born 2001)

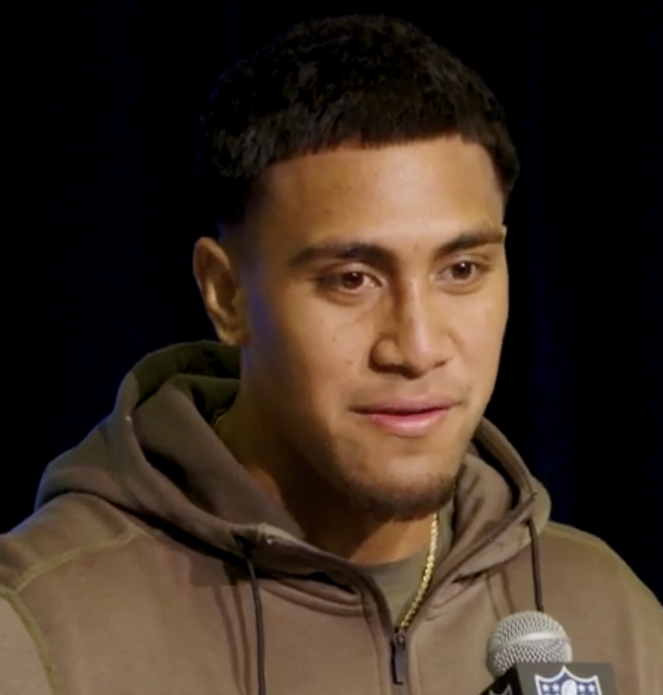
- To'oTo'o at the 2023 NFL Combine

No. 39 – Houston Texans
- Position: Linebacker
- Roster status: Active

Personal information
- Born: January 5, 2001 (age 25); Sacramento, California, U.S.
- Listed height: 6 ft 2 in (1.88 m)
- Listed weight: 228 lb (103 kg)

Career information
- High school: De La Salle (Concord, California)
- College: Tennessee (2019–2020); Alabama (2021–2022)
- NFL draft: 2023: 5th round, 167th overall pick

Career history
- Houston Texans (2023–present)

Awards and highlights
- First-team All-SEC (2022); Second-team All-SEC (2020, 2021)

Career NFL statistics as of 2025
- Total tackles: 261
- Sacks: 4
- Forced fumbles: 2
- Fumble recoveries: 2
- Pass deflections: 9
- Interceptions: 1
- Stats at Pro Football Reference

Henry Moses Ito Iese To'oTo'o (TOH-oh-TOH-oh; born January 5, 2001) is an American professional football linebacker for the Houston Texans of the National Football League (NFL). He played college football for the Tennessee Volunteers and Alabama Crimson Tide.

== Early life ==
Of Samoan and Tongan descent, To'oTo'o was born in Sacramento, California. He attended De La Salle High School in Concord, California. He played both linebacker and running back at De La Salle and was named the Player of the Year by the Bay Area News Group as a senior. To'oTo'o committed to play college football at Tennessee over offers from Alabama, Oregon, USC and Washington.

== College career ==
=== Tennessee ===
To'oTo'o became a starting linebacker at Tennessee early in his true freshman season and was named to the Southeastern Conference (SEC) All-Freshman team after finishing second on the team with 72 tackles. He led the Volunteers with 76 tackles, 10 of which were for a loss, in his sophomore season. In his first game of the 2020 season, he had a pick-six against South Carolina. After the season, To'oTo'o announced that he would be entering the transfer portal.

=== Alabama ===
To'oTo'o transferred to the University of Alabama in 2021. He repeated as a second team All-SEC selection after leading the Crimson Tide with 113 tackles and had 8.5 for loss and four sacks in his first season with the team. To'oTo'o was named first team All-SEC as a senior after making 94 tackles with eight tackles for loss and 2.5 sacks.

In his second season with Alabama, To'oTo'o had 94 total tackles and 2.5 sacks.

== Professional career ==
Pre-draft measurables
Height	Weight	Arm length	Hand span	Wingspan	40-yard dash	10-yard split	20-yard split	20-yard shuttle	Vertical jump	Broad jump
6 ft 1 in (1.85 m)	227 lb (103 kg)	32 3/4 in (0.83 m)	10 1/4 in (0.26 m)	6 ft 5 3/8 in (1.97 m)	4.62 s	1.57 s	2.66 s	4.40 s	32.0 in (0.81 m)	9 ft 8 in (2.95 m)
All values from the NFL Combine

To'oTo'o was selected by the Houston Texans in the fifth round, 167th overall, of the 2023 NFL draft. As a rookie, To'oTo'o appeared in 14 games and started six. He recorded 61 total tackles (35 solo), two passes defended, and one forced fumble.

On August 6, 2026, To'oTo'o signed a two-year, $16 million contract extension with the Texans. On September 15, To'oTo'o was placed on injured reserve due to a shoulder injury suffered in the team's season opener against the Buffalo Bills.

== NFL career statistics ==
Legend
**Bold**	Career high

Year	Team	Games		Tackles					Interceptions						Fumbles			
Year	Team	GP	GS	Cmb	Solo	Ast	Sck	TFL	Int	Yds	Avg	Lng	TD	PD	FF	FR	Yds	TD
2023	HOU	14	6	61	35	26	0.0	2	0	0	0.0	0	0	2	**1**	**1**	0	0
2024	HOU	15	**15**	**105**	**54**	51	1.5	7	**1**	0	0.0	0	0	3	**1**	0	0	0
2025	HOU	**17**	14	95	42	**53**	**2.5**	**9**	0	0	0.0	0	0	**4**	0	**1**	0	0
Career		46	35	261	131	130	4.0	18	1	0	0.0	0	0	9	2	2	0	0

=== Postseason ===
Year	Team	Games		Tackles					Interceptions						Fumbles			
Year	Team	GP	GS	Cmb	Solo	Ast	Sck	TFL	Int	Yds	Avg	Lng	TD	PD	FF	FR	Yds	TD
2023	HOU	**2**	0	4	4	0	0.0	0	0	0	0.0	0	0	0	0	0	0	0
2024	HOU	**2**	**2**	13	4	**9**	0.0	0	0	0	0.0	0	0	0	0	0	0	0
2025	HOU	**2**	**2**	**15**	**6**	**9**	0.0	**1**	0	0	0.0	0	0	**1**	0	0	0	0
Career		6	4	32	14	18	0.0	1	0	0	0.0	0	0	1	0	0	0	0
