= Brevin Jordan =

American football player (born 2000)

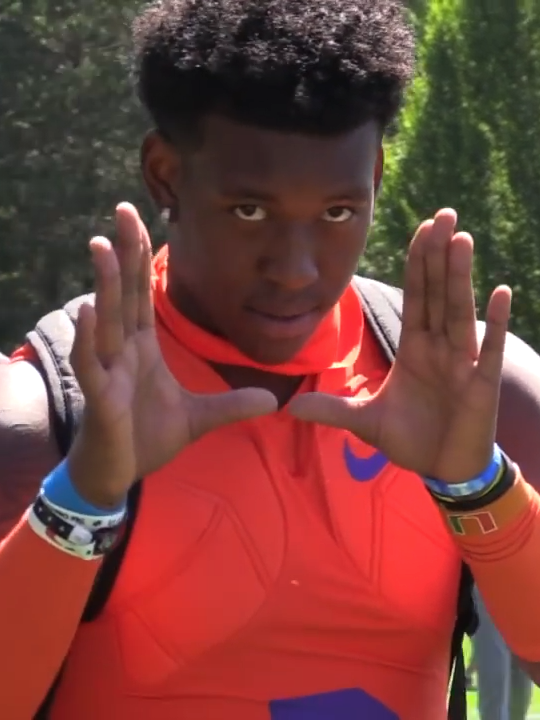
- Jordan in 2017

No. 9 – Houston Texans
- Position: Tight end
- Roster status: Active

Personal information
- Born: July 16, 2000 (age 26); Las Vegas, Nevada, U.S.
- Listed height: 6 ft 3 in (1.91 m)
- Listed weight: 245 lb (111 kg)

Career information
- High school: Bishop Gorman (Summerlin South, Nevada)
- College: Miami (FL) (2018–2020)
- NFL draft: 2021: 5th round, 147th overall pick

Career history
- Houston Texans (2021–present)

Awards and highlights
- First-team All-ACC (2019); 2× Second-team All-ACC (2018, 2020)

Career NFL statistics as of Week 5, 2026
- Receptions: 54
- Receiving yards: 545
- Receiving average: 10.1
- Receiving touchdowns: 5
- Stats at Pro Football Reference

Brevin Jordan (born July 16, 2000) is an American professional football tight end for the Houston Texans of the National Football League (NFL). He played college football for the Miami Hurricanes and was selected by the Texans in the fifth round of the 2021 NFL draft.

== Early life ==
Jordan was born in Las Vegas and attended Bishop Gorman High School in Summerlin, Nevada. During his high school football career, he had over 1,700 yards, 100 receptions and 29 total touchdowns.

In April 2017, Jordan committed to the University of Miami to play college football for the Miami Hurricanes.

College recruiting
Name	Hometown	School	Height	Weight	Commit date
Brevin Jordan; TE	Las Vegas, Nevada	Bishop Gorman High School	6 ft 3 in (1.91 m)	250 lb (110 kg)	Apr 16, 2017
Brevin Jordan; TE	Recruit ratings: Rivals: 247Sports: ESPN:				
Overall recruit ranking: Rivals: 49 (#2 TE, #3 NV) 247Sports: 72 (#2 TE, #4 NV) ESPN: 20 (#1 TE, #2 NV)
Note: In many cases, Scout, Rivals, 247Sports, On3, and ESPN may conflict in their listings of height and weight.; In these cases, the average was taken. ESPN grades are on a 100-point scale.; Sources: "2018 Team Ranking". Rivals.com.

== College career ==
As a true freshman in 2018, Jordan played in 12 games with 11 starts and had 32 receptions for 287 yards and four touchdowns. He returned as the starter in 2019 and 2020 and finished his three year stint at Miami with a total of 105 receptions, 1,358 receiving yards, and 13 touchdown receptions in 31 games.

=== College statistics ===
Year	Team	Games		Receiving			
Year	Team	GP	GS	Rec	Yards	Avg	TD
2018	Miami	12	11	32	287	9.0	4
2019	Miami	11	10	35	495	14.1	2
2020	Miami	8	8	38	576	15.2	7
Career		31	29	105	1,358	12.9	13

== Professional career ==
Pre-draft measurables
Height	Weight	Arm length	Hand span	Wingspan	40-yard dash	10-yard split	20-yard split	20-yard shuttle	Three-cone drill	Vertical jump	Broad jump	Bench press
6 ft 2 5/8 in (1.90 m)	247 lb (112 kg)	32 7/8 in (0.84 m)	9 3/4 in (0.25 m)	6 ft 7 1/4 in (2.01 m)	4.67 s	1.59 s	2.72 s	4.50 s	7.57 s	34.0 in (0.86 m)	9 ft 8 in (2.95 m)	17 reps
All values from Pro Day

Jordan was selected by the Houston Texans in the fifth round, 147th overall, of the 2021 NFL draft. On May 12, 2021, Jordan officially signed with the Texans. He scored a nine-yard receiving touchdown in his NFL debut, a 38–22 loss to the Los Angeles Rams in Week 8. Jordan finished his rookie season with nine appearances and two starts; he had 20 receptions for 178 receiving yards and three receiving touchdowns.

In the 2022 season, Jordan appeared in 11 games and started three. He finished with 14 receptions for 128 yards.

For the 2023 season, Jordan finished the season starting six games (appearing in 14) and had a career high 219 yards while recording two touchdowns. Against the Cleveland Browns in the Wild Card round of the playoffs, Jordan recorded a 76-yard touchdown, the longest reception of his career as the Texans would win the game 45–14.

Jordan suffered a torn ACL in Week 2 of the 2024 season and was placed on season-ending injured reserve. On December 5, 2024, Jordan agreed to a one–year contract extension with Houston.

On August 11, 2025, Jordan was placed on season-ending injured reserve after suffering a knee injury during a practice. On December 8, Jordan and the Texans agreed to a one-year contract extension.

On August 30, 2026, Jordan was released by the Texans as a part of final roster cuts. The following day, Houston re–signed Jordan to their active roster.

== NFL career statistics ==
=== Regular season ===
Year	Team	Games		Receiving					Fumbles	
Year	Team	GP	GS	Rec	Yds	Avg	Lng	TD	Fum	Lost
2021	HOU	9	2	20	178	8.9	27	3	0	0
2022	HOU	11	3	14	128	9.1	20	0	0	0
2023	HOU	14	6	17	219	12.9	27	2	0	0
2024	HOU	2	1	2	7	3.5	4	0	0	0
2025	HOU	Did not play due to injury								
2026	HOU	2	0	1	13	13.0	13	0	0	0
Career		38	12	54	545	10.1	27	5	0	0

=== Postseason ===
Year	Team	Games		Receiving					Fumbles	
Year	Team	GP	GS	Rec	Yds	Avg	Lng	TD	Fum	Lost
2023	HOU	2	2	1	76	76.0	76T	1	0	0
Career		2	2	1	76	76.0	76	1	0	0

== Personal life ==
His father, Darrell, played college football for the Northern Arizona Lumberjacks and was drafted in the ninth round of the 1990 NFL draft by the Atlanta Falcons. However, he would tear his rotator cuff in the preseason and would never make an NFL game appearance.
