= 2024 Houston Texans season =

23rd season in franchise history

- Owner: Cal McNair
- General manager: Nick Caserio
- Head coach: DeMeco Ryans
- Offensive coordinator: Bobby Slowik
- Defensive coordinator: Matt Burke
- Home stadium: NRG Stadium

Results
- Record: 10–7
- Division place: 1st AFC South
- Playoffs: Won Wild Card Playoffs (vs. Chargers) 32–12; Lost Divisional Playoffs (at Chiefs) 14–23
- All-Pros: CB Derek Stingley Jr. (1st team)
- Pro Bowlers: 5: RB Joe Mixon; WR Nico Collins; T Laremy Tunsil; CB Derek Stingley Jr.; DE Danielle Hunter

Uniform
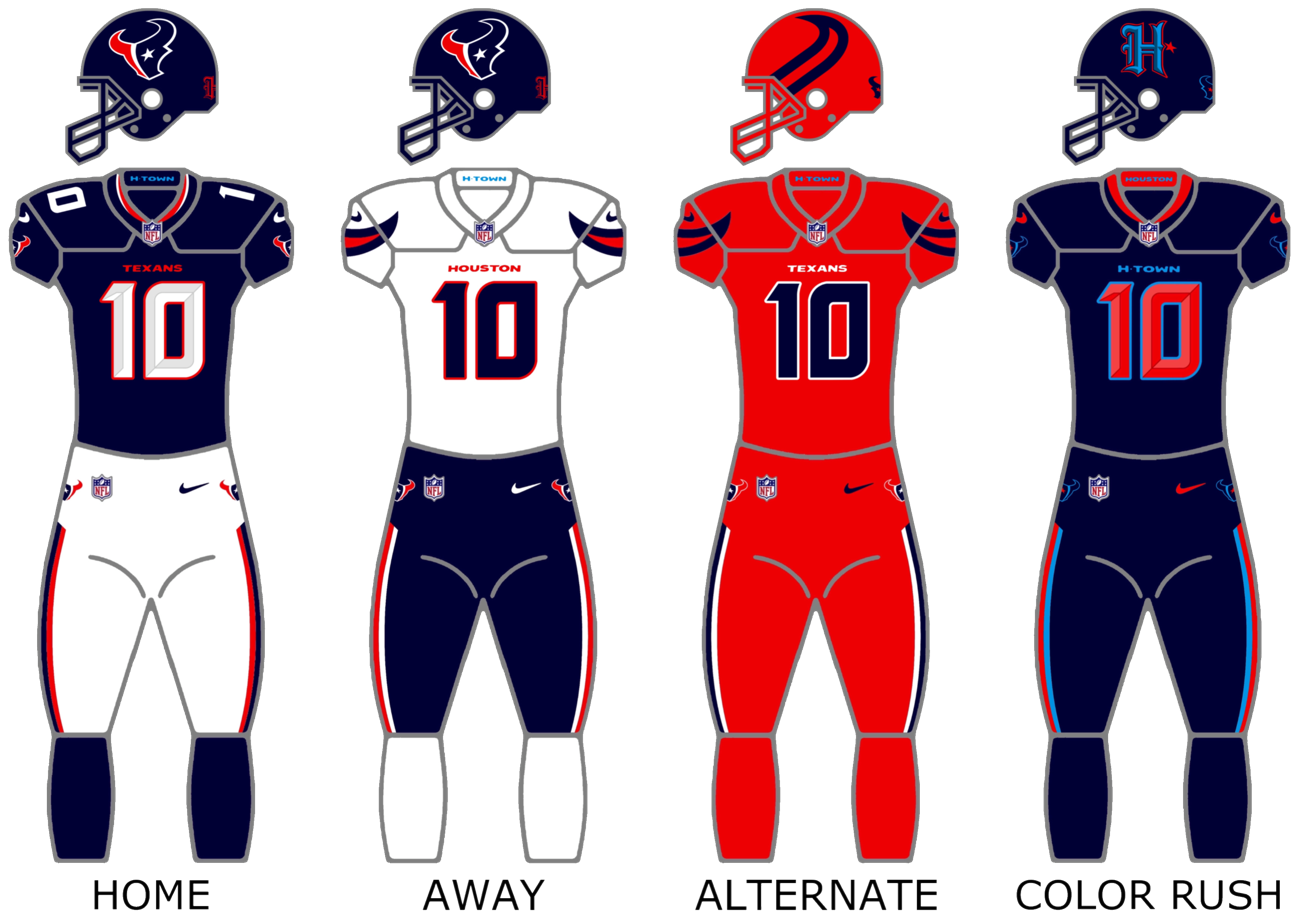

The 2024 season was the Houston Texans' 23rd in the National Football League (NFL) and the second under head coach DeMeco Ryans. The team introduced new uniforms for the first time since the franchise's inception. This was the Texans' first season with Cal McNair as the franchise's sole principal owner. The Texans started 2–0 for the first time since 2016 following their Week 2 victory against the Chicago Bears on Sunday Night Football. The Texans would go on to have a 5–1 start, being their best start since 2012, but lost six of their next ten, including a game against the Detroit Lions where they blew a 23–7 halftime lead, and a loss to the Baltimore Ravens on Christmas where they lost 31–2, only scoring a safety. Poor offensive-line play alongside numerous injuries contributed to these losses, including injuries to their top three receivers, Nico Collins, Stefon Diggs, and Tank Dell. Because of a sweep of their division rival Indianapolis Colts, a Week 15 victory against the Miami Dolphins coupled with the Colts’ loss to the Denver Broncos resulted in the Texans successfully defending their AFC South title and clinching a second consecutive playoff performance. After a Week 18 victory over the Tennessee Titans, the Texans finished with the same record as the season before, 10–7.

Despite their inconsistent regular season performance, the Texans' dominated the Los Angeles Chargers 32–12 in the Wild Card Round to advance to the Divisional Round for the second consecutive season, where they lost to the AFC's top seed and two-time defending Super Bowl champion Kansas City Chiefs 23–14.

== Offseason ==
=== Signings ===
| Position | Player | Age | 2023 team | Contract |
|---|---|---|---|---|
| RB | Dare Ogunbowale | 29 | Houston Texans | 1 year, $1.5 million |
| LB | Azeez Al-Shaair | 26 | Tennessee Titans | 3 years, $34 million |
| LB | Del'Shawn Phillips | 27 | Baltimore Ravens | 1 year, $2.6 million |
| LB | Jacob Phillips | 25 | Cleveland Browns | 1 year, $1.15 million |
| DE | Danielle Hunter | 29 | Minnesota Vikings | 2 years, $49 million |
| DE | Denico Autry | 33 | Tennessee Titans | 2 years, $20 million |
| DE | Mario Edwards Jr. | 30 | Seattle Seahawks | 1 year, $1.65 million |
| DE | Derek Barnett | 27 | Houston Texans | 1 years, $2 million |
| DT | Folorunso Fatukasi | 29 | Jacksonville Jaguars | 1 year, $3.125 million |
| DT | Tim Settle | 26 | Buffalo Bills | 2 years, $7 million |
| CB | Myles Bryant | 26 | New England Patriots | 1 year, $1.75 million |
| CB | Jeff Okudah | 25 | Atlanta Falcons | 1 year, $6 million |
| CB | Mike Ford | 28 | Cleveland Browns | 2 years, $4.5 million |
| CB | Lonnie Johnson Jr. | 28 | New Orleans Saints | 1 year, $2.5 million |
| CB | C. J. Henderson | 25 | Carolina Panthers | 1 year, $3.25 million |
| OT | David Sharpe | 28 | Carolina Panthers | 2 years, $2.58 million |
| P | Tommy Townsend | 27 | Kansas City Chiefs | 2 years, $6 million |

=== Trades ===
| March 13 | To Houston Texans: Joe Mixon | To Cincinnati Bengals: 2024 7th round pick #224 (from Arizona) |
| March 13 | To Houston Texans: 2024 7th round pick #232 (from Denver) | To San Francisco 49ers: Maliek Collins |
| March 15 | To Houston Texans: 2024 2nd round pick #42; 2024 6th round pick #188; 2025 2nd round pick (traded to BUF) | To Minnesota Vikings: 2024 1st round pick #23; 2024 7th round pick #232 |
| April 3 | To Houston Texans: Stefon Diggs; 2024 6th round pick #189; 2025 5th round pick | To Buffalo Bills: 2025 2nd round pick (from Minnesota) |
| May 9 | To Houston Texans: Ben Skowronek; 2026 7th round pick | To Los Angeles Rams: 2026 6th round pick |

=== Draft ===
2024 Houston Texans draft selections
| Round | Selection | Player | Position | College | Notes |
|---|---|---|---|---|---|
| 1 | 23 | Traded to the Minnesota Vikings (Note: The Texans traded first- and seventh-round selections (23rd and 232nd overall) to the Minnesota Vikings in exchange for second- and sixth-round selections (42nd and 188th), and a 2025 second-round selection.) | | | |
| 1 | 27 | Traded to the Arizona Cardinals (Note: The Texans traded first- and third-round selections (27th and 90th), and 2023 first- and second-round selections (12th and 33rd) to the Arizona Cardinals in exchange for 2023 first- and fourth-round selections (3rd and 105th overall).) | | | |
| 2 | 42 | Kamari Lassiter | CB | Georgia | From Vikings |
| 2 | 59 | Blake Fisher | OT | Notre Dame | |
| 3 | 78 | Calen Bullock | S | USC | From Seahawks via Commanders and Eagles (Note: The Texans traded third- and fourth-round selections (86th and 123rd overall) to the Philadelphia Eagles in exchange for a third-round selection (78th overall).) |
| 3 | 86 | Traded to the Philadelphia Eagles | | | From Eagles (Note: The Texans traded a 2023 fourth-round selection (105th) to the Philadelphia Eagles in exchange for a third-round selection (86th overall).) |
| 3 | 90 | Traded to the Arizona Cardinals | | | |
| 4 | 123 | Cade Stover | TE | Ohio State | From Browns via Eagles (Note: The Texans traded a fourth-round selection (127th overall) and a 2025 fifth-round selection to the Philadelphia Eagles in exchange for a fourth-round selection (123rd overall).) |
| 4 | 127 | Traded to the Philadelphia Eagles | | | |
| 5 | 162 | Traded to the Arizona Cardinals (Note: The Texans traded a fifth-round selection (162nd overall) to the Arizona Cardinals in exchange for a seventh-round selection (224th overall) and OT Josh Jones.) | | | |
| 6 | 188 | Jamal Hill | LB | Oregon | From Raiders via Patriots and Vikings |
| 6 | 189 | Traded to the Detroit Lions (Note: The Texans traded a sixth-round selection (189th overall) to the Detroit Lions in exchange for sixth- and seventh-round selections (205th and 249th overall).) | | | From Bills (Note: The Texans traded a 2025 second-round selection to the Buffalo Bills in exchange for a sixth-round selection (189th overall), a 2025 fifth-round selection and WR Stefon Diggs.) |
| 6 | 205 | Jawhar Jordan | RB | Louisville | From Lions |
| 7 | 224 | Traded to the Cincinnati Bengals (Note: The Texans traded a seventh-round selection (224th overall) to the Cincinnati Bengals in exchange for RB Joe Mixon.) | | | From Cardinals |
| 7 | 232 | Traded to the Minnesota Vikings | | | |
| 7 | 238 | Solomon Byrd | DE | USC | From Saints (Note: The Texans traded RB Mark Ingram II to the New Orleans Saints in exchange for a seventh-round selection (238th overall).) |
| 7 | 247 | Marcus Harris | DT | Auburn | |
| 7 | 249 | LaDarius Henderson | G | Michigan | From Lions |

2024 Houston Texans undrafted free agents
| Name | Position | College | Ref. |
|---|---|---|---|
| Tarique Barnes | LB | Illinois | |
| British Brooks | RB | North Carolina | |
| Jadon Janke | WR | South Dakota State | |
| Jaxon Janke | WR | South Dakota State | |
| Pheldarius Payne | DE | Virginia Tech | |
| Max Tooley | LB | BYU | |

Draft trades

== NFL Top 100 ==
NFL Network began announcing its annual top 100 list on July 22, 2024. Four players were named to the list.

| Rank | Player | Position | Change |
|---|---|---|---|
| 20 | C. J. Stroud | Quarterback | NR |
| 56 | Stefon Diggs | Wide receiver | ▼40 |
| 68 | Danielle Hunter | Defensive end | NR |
| 71 | Laremy Tunsil | Offensive tackle | ▲14 |

== Staff ==
2024 Houston Texans staff
| Front office: Owner/CEO/chairman – Cal McNair; President – Greg Grissom; General manager – Nick Caserio; Executive vice president/general counsel – Greg Kondritz; Executive director of player personnel – James Liipfert; Assistant director of player personnel – Chris Blanco; Co-directors of college scouting – Mozique McCurtis and John Richter; Director of pro scouting – D. J. Debick; Senior personnel executive/assistant director of pro scouting – Steve Cargile; Head coaches: Head coach – DeMeco Ryans; Assistant head coach/running backs – Danny Barrett; Offensive coaches: Offensive coordinator – Bobby Slowik; Quarterbacks – Jerrod Johnson; Wide receivers/offensive passing game coordinator – Ben McDaniels; Tight ends – Jake Moreland; Offensive line – Chris Strausser; Assistant offensive line – Cole Popovich; Assistant offensive line – Zach Yenser; Senior offensive assistant – Bill Lazor; Offensive assistant – Jarrod James; Offensive assistant – Mike Snyder; Offensive quality control – Leander Wallace | Defensive coaches: Defensive coordinator – Matt Burke; Defensive passing game coordinator – Cory Undlin; Defensive line – Rod Wright; Assistant defensive line – Nate Ollie; Linebackers – Billy Davis; Defensive backs – Dino Vasso; Safeties – Stephen Adegoke; Defensive assistant – Sean Baker; Defensive assistant – Ben Bolling; Defensive assistant – Ryan Milus; Special teams coaches: Special teams coordinator – Frank Ross; Assistant special teams coordinator – Will Burnham; Strength and conditioning: Head strength and conditioning – Mike Eubanks; Assistant strength and conditioning – Chris Cervantes; Assistant strength and conditioning – Joe Distor; Assistant strength and conditioning – Pat Moorer |

== Final roster ==
2024 Houston Texans roster
| Quarterbacks (QB): 10 Davis Mills; 7 C. J. Stroud; Running backs (RB): 28 Joe Mixon; 33 Dare Ogunbowale; 31 Dameon Pierce; Wide receivers (WR): 12 Nico Collins; 19 Xavier Hutchinson; 8 John Metchie III; 14 Jared Wayne; 2 Robert Woods; Tight ends (TE): 86 Dalton Schultz; 83 Irv Smith Jr. | Offensive linemen (OL): 64 Nick Broeker G; 75 Austin Deculus T; 57 Blake Fisher T; 53 Kendrick Green G; 76 Kenyon Green G; 71 Tytus Howard T/G; 69 Shaq Mason G; 54 Jarrett Patterson C; 70 Juice Scruggs C/G; 78 Laremy Tunsil T; Defensive linemen (DL): 51 Will Anderson Jr. DE; 96 Denico Autry DE; 95 Derek Barnett DE; 97 Mario Edwards Jr. DT; 91 Folorunso Fatukasi DT; 93 Kurt Hinish DT; 92 Dylan Horton DE; 52 Jerry Hughes DE; 55 Danielle Hunter DE; 98 Tim Settle DT; 72 Tommy Togiai DT | Linebackers (LB): 0 Azeez Al-Shaair MLB; 35 Jake Hansen OLB; 48 Christian Harris OLB; 43 Neville Hewitt MLB; 13 Del'Shawn Phillips OLB; 39 Henry To'oTo'o OLB; 45 Devin White OLB; Defensive backs (DB): 17 Kris Boyd CB; 27 Myles Bryant CB; 21 Calen Bullock FS; 4 Kamari Lassiter CB; 23 Eric Murray SS; 11 Jeff Okudah CB; 37 D'Angelo Ross CB; 29 M. J. Stewart FS; 24 Derek Stingley Jr. CB; Special teams (ST): 15 Kaʻimi Fairbairn K; 6 Tommy Townsend P; 46 Jon Weeks LS | Practice squad: 79 Tremayne Anchrum G; 30 Anthony Averett CB; 47 Andrew Beck FB; 50 Solomon Byrd DE; 82 Alex Erickson WR; 34 Troy Hairston FB; 81 Jaxon Janke WR; 88 Johnny Johnson III WR; 89 Xavier Johnson WR; 42 Jawhar Jordan RB; 41 Gregory Junior CB; 94 Jayden Peevy DT; 58 Scott Quessenberry C; 16 Kedon Slovis QB; 26 J. J. Taylor RB; 25 Russ Yeast SS; 66 Kilian Zierer T (IPP); Reserve: 44 British Brooks FB (IR); 3 Tank Dell WR (IR); 1 Stefon Diggs WR (IR); 77 LaDarius Henderson G/T (NF-Inj.); 36 Brandon Hill FS (IR); 56 Jamal Hill OLB (IR); 32 Ka'dar Hollman CB (IR); 9 Brevin Jordan TE (IR); 40 Dalton Keene TE (IR); 18 Case Keenum QB (IR); 5 Jalen Pitre FS (IR); 85 Teagan Quitoriano TE (IR/DFR); 87 Cade Stover TE (IR); -- Jaylon Thomas G (IR); 74 Zachary Thomas T (NF-Ill.); 20 Jimmie Ward (IR) SS/FS; Rookies in italics 52 active, 16 reserve, 16 practice squad (1 exempt) |

== Preseason ==
=== Schedule ===
On March 26, the NFL announced that the Texans would play the Chicago Bears in the Pro Football Hall of Fame Game on Thursday, August 1, at Tom Benson Hall of Fame Stadium in Canton, Ohio, at 7:00 p.m. CDT. The Texans were represented by Andre Johnson. The two teams also met in Week 2 of the regular season in Houston.

| Week | Date | Opponent | Result | Record | Venue | Recap |
|---|---|---|---|---|---|---|
| HOF | August 1 | vs. Chicago Bears | L 17–21 | 0–1 | Tom Benson Hall of Fame Stadium | Recap |
| 1 | August 9 | at Pittsburgh Steelers | W 20–12 | 1–1 | Acrisure Stadium | Recap |
| 2 | August 17 | New York Giants | W 28–10 | 2–1 | NRG Stadium | Recap |
| 3 | August 24 | Los Angeles Rams | W 17–15 | 3–1 | NRG Stadium | Recap |

=== Game summaries ===
==== Hall of Fame Game: vs. Chicago Bears ====
Hall of Fame Game: Houston Texans vs. Chicago Bears – Game summary

| Quarter | 1 | 2 | 3 | 4 | Total |
|---|---|---|---|---|---|
| Texans | 7 | 10 | 0 | - | 17 |
| Bears | 0 | 14 | 7 | - | 21 |

at Tom Benson Hall of Fame Stadium, Canton, Ohio

- Date: August 1
- Game time: 7:00 p.m. CDT
- Game weather: 86 °F (30 °C)
- Game attendance: 17,528
- Referee: John Hussey
- TV announcers (ESPN/ABC): Joe Buck, Troy Aikman, and Lisa Salters
- Recap, Game Book

Game information

First quarter

- HOU – Teagan Quitoriano 9-yard pass from Davis Mills (Kaʻimi Fairbairn kick), 8:39. Texans 7–0. Drive: 13 plays, 74 yards, 6:21.

Second quarter

- HOU – Kaʻimi Fairbairn 33-yard field goal, 12:13. Texans 10–0. Drive: 12 plays, 74 yards, 6:45.
- CHI – Collin Johnson 20-yard pass from Brett Rypien (Cairo Santos kick), 8:22. Texans 10–7. Drive: 8 plays, 80 yards, 3:51.
- HOU – Cam Akers 4-yard pass from Case Keenum (Kaʻimi Fairbairn kick), 1:44. Texans 17–7. Drive: 9 plays, 70 yards, 3:42.
- CHI – Tommy Sweeney 22-yard pass from Brett Rypien (Cairo Santos kick), 0:46. Texans 17–14. Drive: 5 plays, 72 yards, 0:58.

Third quarter

- CHI – Collin Johnson 9-yard pass from Brett Rypien (Cairo Santos kick), 11:39. Bears 21–17. Drive: 8 plays, 68 yards, 3:21.

Top passers

- HOU – Davis Mills – 10/13, 102 yards, TD
- CHI – Brett Rypien – 11/15, 166 yards, 3 TD

Top rushers

- HOU – J. J. Taylor – 6 rushes, 16 yards
- CHI – Khalil Herbert – 4 rushes, 35 yards

Top receivers

- HOU – Xavier Hutchinson – 5 receptions, 56 yards
- CHI – Collin Johnson – 3 receptions, 56 yards, 2 TD

The game went into a weather delay with 3:31 left in the third quarter with a thunderstorm raining down on the stadium with lightning in the area. After a delay of 30 minutes, the game was officially called.

==== Preseason Week 1: at Pittsburgh Steelers ====
Preseason Week 1: Houston Texans at Pittsburgh Steelers – Game summary

| Quarter | 1 | 2 | 3 | 4 | Total |
|---|---|---|---|---|---|
| Texans | 7 | 10 | 3 | 0 | 20 |
| Steelers | 0 | 0 | 6 | 6 | 12 |

at Acrisure Stadium, Pittsburgh, Pennsylvania

- Date: August 9
- Game time: 6:00 p.m. EST/5:00 p.m. CST
- Game attendance: 63,194
- TV announcers (KTRK/NFLN): Kevin Kugler, ND Kalu, John Harris, Shelby Coppedge
- Recap, Game Book

Game information

First quarter

- HOU – Tank Dell 34-yard pass from C. J. Stroud (Kaʻimi Fairbairn kick), 6:17. Texans 7–0. Drive: 3 plays, 36 yards, 0:50.

Second quarter

- HOU – Dare Ogunbowale 4-yard run (Kaʻimi Fairbairn kick), 3:52. Texans 14–0. Drive: 6 plays, 30 yards, 2:58.
- HOU – Kaʻimi Fairbairn 36-yard field goal, 0:03. Texans 17–0. Drive: 10 plays, 62 yards, 1:49.

Third quarter

- PIT – Connor Heyward 6-yard pass from Kyle Allen (kick failed, wide left), 4:31. Texans 17–6. Drive: 10 plays, 78 yards, 6:32.
- HOU – Kaʻimi Fairbairn 51-yard field goal, 0:12. Texans 20–6. Drive: 8 plays, 43 yards, 4:19.

Fourth quarter

- PIT – Daijun Edwards 1-run (run failed), 12:47. Texans 20–12. Drive: 5 plays, 72 yards, 2:25.

Top passers

- HOU – Davis Mills – 8/13, 89 yards
- PIT – Kyle Allen – 17/23, 193 yards, TD

Top rushers

- HOU – Jawhar Jordan – 6 rushes, 22 yards
- PIT – Daijun Edwards – 3 rushes, 28 yards, TD

Top receivers

- HOU – Robert Woods – 4 receptions, 42 yards
- PIT – Calvin Austin – 2 receptions, 49 yards

==== Preseason Week 2: vs New York Giants ====
Preseason Week 2: New York Giants at Houston Texans – Game summary

| Quarter | 1 | 2 | 3 | 4 | Total |
|---|---|---|---|---|---|
| Giants | 0 | 10 | 0 | 0 | 10 |
| Texans | 7 | 7 | 0 | 14 | 28 |

at NRG Stadium, Houston, Texas

- Date: August 17
- Game time: 12:00 p.m. CST
- Game attendance: 69,913
- TV announcers (KTRK): Kevin Kugler, ND Kalu, John Harris, Shelby Coppedge
- Recap

Game information

First quarter

- HOU – Jalen Pitre 5-yard interception return (Kaʻimi Fairbairn kick), 7:24. Texans 7–0. Drive: 2 plays, 2 yards, 0:38.

Second quarter

- NYG – Devin Singletary 1-yard run (Graham Gano kick), 10:31. Tied 7–7. Drive: 7 plays, 68 yards, 4:16.
- HOU – John Metchie III 3-yard pass from Case Keenum (Kaʻimi Fairbairn kick), 3:48. Texans 14–7. Drive: 12 plays, 79 yards, 6:43.
- NYG – Graham Gano 31-yard field goal, 0:21. Texans 14–10. Drive: 12 plays, 64 yards, 3:27.

Third quarter

- No scoring plays.

Fourth quarter

- HOU – British Brooks 6-yard run (Kaʻimi Fairbairn kick), 12:12. Texans 21–10. Drive: 11 plays, 77 yards, 5:40.
- HOU – British Brooks 15-yard run (Kaʻimi Fairbairn kick), 3:43. Texans 28–10. Drive: 5 plays, 27 yards, 2:31.

Top passers

- NYG – Daniel Jones – 11/18, 138 yards, 2 INT
- HOU – Tim Boyle – 10/15, 94 yards

Top rushers

- NYG – Devin Singletary – 10 rushes, 20 yards, TD
- HOU – J. J. Taylor – 5 rushes, 36 yards

Top receivers

- NYG – Darius Slayton – 3 receptions, 59 yards
- HOU – John Metchie III – 6 receptions, 68 yards, TD

==== Preseason Week 3: vs Los Angeles Rams ====
Preseason Week 3: Los Angeles Rams at Houston Texans – Game summary

| Quarter | 1 | 2 | 3 | 4 | Total |
|---|---|---|---|---|---|
| Rams | 3 | 6 | 0 | 6 | 15 |
| Texans | 3 | 7 | 0 | 7 | 17 |

at NRG Stadium, Houston, Texas

- Date: August 24
- Game time: 12:00 p.m. CST
- Game attendance: 69,829
- TV announcers (KTRK): Kevin Kugler, ND Kalu, John Harris, Shelby Coppedge
- Recap, Game Book

Game information

First quarter

- LAR – Joshua Karty 21-yard field goal, 11:51. Rams 3–0. Drive: 4 plays, 9 yards, 1:39.
- HOU – Kaʻimi Fairbairn 48-yard field goal, 5:02. Tied 3–3. Drive: 8 plays, 25 yards, 3:10.

Second quarter

- HOU – Troy Hairston 5-yard pass from Tim Boyle (Kaʻimi Fairbairn kick), 14:21. Texans 10–3. Drive: 8 plays, 58 yards, 4:07.
- LAR – Zach Evans 4-yard run (kick failed, hit right upright), 7:10. Texans 10–9. Drive: 11 plays, 70 yards, 7:11.

Third quarter

- No scoring plays.

Fourth quarter

- HOU – Johnny Johnson III 10-yard pass from Tim Boyle (Kaʻimi Fairbairn kick), 14:13. Texans 17–9. Drive: 12 plays, 91 yards, 6:47.
- LAR – Zach Evans 3-yard run (run failed), 3:15. Texans 17–15. Drive: 12 plays, 71 yards, 7:06.

Top passers

- LAR – Dresser Winn – 9/16, 72 yards
- HOU – Tim Boyle – 19/28, 142 yards, 2 TD

Top rushers

- LAR – Zach Evans – 14 rushes, 45 yards, 2 TD
- HOU – Cam Akers – 7 rushes, 53 yards

Top receivers

- LAR – Xavier Smith – 4 receptions, 34 yards
- HOU – Xavier Hutchinson – 4 receptions, 34 yards

== Regular season ==
=== Schedule ===
| Week | Date | Opponent | Result | Record | Venue | Recap |
|---|---|---|---|---|---|---|
| 1 | September 8 | at **Indianapolis Colts** | **W** 29–27 | 1–0 | Lucas Oil Stadium | Recap |
| 2 | September 15 | Chicago Bears | **W** 19–13 | 2–0 | NRG Stadium | Recap |
| 3 | September 22 | at Minnesota Vikings | **L** 7–34 | 2–1 | U.S. Bank Stadium | Recap |
| 4 | September 29 | **Jacksonville Jaguars** | **W** 24–20 | 3–1 | NRG Stadium | Recap |
| 5 | October 6 | Buffalo Bills | **W** 23–20 | 4–1 | NRG Stadium | Recap |
| 6 | October 13 | at New England Patriots | **W** 41–21 | 5–1 | Gillette Stadium | Recap |
| 7 | October 20 | at Green Bay Packers | **L** 22–24 | 5–2 | Lambeau Field | Recap |
| 8 | October 27 | **Indianapolis Colts** | **W** 23–20 | 6–2 | NRG Stadium | Recap |
| 9 | October 31 | at New York Jets | **L** 13–21 | 6–3 | MetLife Stadium | Recap |
| 10 | November 10 | Detroit Lions | **L** 23–26 | 6–4 | NRG Stadium | Recap |
| 11 | November 18 | at Dallas Cowboys | **W** 34–10 | 7–4 | AT&T Stadium | Recap |
| 12 | November 24 | **Tennessee Titans** | **L** 27–32 | 7–5 | NRG Stadium | Recap |
| 13 | December 1 | at **Jacksonville Jaguars** | **W** 23–20 | 8–5 | EverBank Stadium | Recap |
| 14 | Bye | | | | | |
| 15 | December 15 | Miami Dolphins | **W** 20–12 | 9–5 | NRG Stadium | Recap |
| 16 | December 21 | at Kansas City Chiefs | **L** 19–27 | 9–6 | Arrowhead Stadium | Recap |
| 17 | December 25 | Baltimore Ravens | **L** 2–31 | 9–7 | NRG Stadium | Recap |
| 18 | January 5 | at **Tennessee Titans** | **W** 23–14 | 10–7 | Nissan Stadium | Recap |

Note: Intra-division opponents are in bold text.

=== Game summaries ===
==== Week 1: at Indianapolis Colts ====
Week 1: Houston Texans at Indianapolis Colts – Game summary

| Quarter | 1 | 2 | 3 | 4 | Total |
|---|---|---|---|---|---|
| **Texans** | 6 | 6 | 3 | 14 | **29** |
| Colts | 7 | 0 | 6 | 14 | **27** |

at Lucas Oil Stadium, Indianapolis, Indiana

- Date: September 8
- Game time: 1:00 p.m. EDT/12:00 p.m. CDT
- Game weather: Mostly sunny, 63 °F (17 °C) (retractable roof open)
- Game attendance: 65,306
- Referee: John Hussey
- TV announcers (CBS): Andrew Catalon, Tiki Barber, Jason McCourty and A.J. Ross
- Recap, Game Book

Game information

**First quarter**

- HOU – Kaʻimi Fairbairn 51-yard field goal, 6:44. Texans 3–0. **Drive: 8 plays, 21 yards, 4:56.**
- IND – Alec Pierce 60-yard pass from Anthony Richardson (Spencer Shrader kick), 5:12. Colts 7–3. **Drive: 3 plays, 73 yards, 1:32.**
- HOU – Kaʻimi Fairbairn 50-yard field goal, 1:37. Colts 7–6. **Drive: 7 plays, 38 yards, 3:35.**

**Second quarter**

- HOU – Stefon Diggs 9-yard pass from C. J. Stroud (run failed), 11:31. Texans 12–7. **Drive: 7 plays, 81 yards, 3:29.**

**Third quarter**

- HOU – Kaʻimi Fairbairn 51-yard field goal, 10:55. Texans 15–7. **Drive: 9 plays, 37 yards, 4:05.**
- IND – Jonathan Taylor 5-yard run (run failed), 5:40. Texans 15–13. **Drive: 1 play, 5 yards, 0:03.**

**Fourth quarter**

- HOU – Joe Mixon 3-yard run (Kaʻimi Fairbairn kick), 13:41. Texans 22–13. **Drive: 13 plays, 70 yards, 6:59.**
- IND – Ashton Dulin 54-yard pass from Anthony Richardson (Spencer Shrader kick), 12:12. Texans 22–20. **Drive: 4 plays, 70 yards, 1:29.**
- HOU – Stefon Diggs 2-yard pass from C. J. Stroud (Kaʻimi Fairbairn kick), 4:42. Texans 29–20. **Drive: 11 plays, 70 yards, 7:30.**
- IND – Anthony Richardson 3-yard run (Spencer Shrader kick), 2:14. Texans 29–27. **Drive: 8 plays, 68 yards, 2:28.**

**Top passers**

- HOU – C. J. Stroud – 24/32, 234 yards, 2 TD
- IND – Anthony Richardson – 9/19, 212 yards, 2 TD, INT

**Top rushers**

- HOU – Joe Mixon – 30 rushes, 159 yards, TD
- IND – Anthony Richardson – 6 rushes, 56 yards, TD

**Top receivers**

- HOU – Nico Collins – 6 receptions, 117 yards
- IND – Alec Pierce – 3 receptions, 125 yards, TD

The Texans defeated the Colts for their first week 1 win since 2021.

==== Week 2: vs. Chicago Bears ====
Week 2: Chicago Bears at Houston Texans – Game summary

| Quarter | 1 | 2 | 3 | 4 | Total |
|---|---|---|---|---|---|
| Bears | 3 | 7 | 0 | 3 | **13** |
| **Texans** | 3 | 13 | 0 | 3 | **19** |

at NRG Stadium, Houston, Texas

- Date: September 15
- Game time: 7:15 p.m. CDT
- Game weather: Clear, 89 °F (32 °C) (retractable roof open)
- Game attendance: 71,412
- Referee: Land Clark
- TV announcers (NBC): Mike Tirico, Cris Collinsworth and Melissa Stark
- Recap, Game Book

Game information

**First quarter**

- HOU – Kaʻimi Fairbairn 56-yard field goal, 10:20. Texans 3–0. **Drive: 8 plays, 33 yards, 4:40.**
- CHI – Cairo Santos 53-yard field goal, 3:51. Tied 3–3. **Drive: 11 plays, 42 yards, 6:29.**

**Second quarter**

- HOU – Nico Collins 28-yard pass from C. J. Stroud (Kaʻimi Fairbairn kick), 14:55. Texans 10–3. **Drive: 8 plays, 77 yards, 3:56.**
- HOU – Kaʻimi Fairbairn 47-yard field goal, 9:55. Texans 13–3. **Drive: 8 plays, 48 yards, 3:38.**
- CHI – Khalil Herbert 2-yard run (Cairo Santos kick), 0:32. Texans 13–10. **Drive: 8 plays, 49 yards, 3:10.**
- HOU – Kaʻimi Fairbairn 59-yard field goal, 0:01. Texans 16–10. **Drive: 5 plays, 24 yards, 0:31.**

**Third quarter**

- No scoring plays.

**Fourth quarter**

- HOU – Kaʻimi Fairbairn 53-yard field goal, 13:39. Texans 19–10. **Drive: 7 plays, 32 yards, 2:11.**
- CHI – Cairo Santos 54-yard field goal, 2:51. Texans 19–13. **Drive: 12 plays, 61 yards, 3:37.**

**Top passers**

- CHI – Caleb Williams – 23/37, 174 yards, 2 INT
- HOU – C. J. Stroud – 23/36, 260 yards, TD

**Top rushers**

- CHI – Caleb Williams – 5 rushes, 44 yards
- HOU – Cam Akers – 7 rushes, 32 yards

**Top receivers**

- CHI – D. J. Moore – 6 receptions, 53 yards
- HOU – Nico Collins – 8 receptions, 135 yards, TD

With this win, the Texans earned their first 2–0 start since 2016.

==== Week 3: at Minnesota Vikings ====
Week 3: Houston Texans at Minnesota Vikings – Game summary

| Quarter | 1 | 2 | 3 | 4 | Total |
|---|---|---|---|---|---|
| Texans | 0 | 0 | 7 | 0 | **7** |
| **Vikings** | 14 | 0 | 7 | 13 | **34** |

at U.S. Bank Stadium, Minneapolis, Minnesota

- Date: September 22
- Game time: 12:00 p.m. CDT
- Game weather: None (indoor stadium)
- Game attendance: 66,843
- Referee: Shawn Hochuli
- TV announcers (CBS): Ian Eagle, Charles Davis, and Evan Washburn
- Recap, Game Book

Game information

**First quarter**

- MIN – Justin Jefferson 6-yard pass from Sam Darnold (Will Reichard kick), 12:03. Vikings 7–0. **Drive: 6 plays, 21 yards, 2:21.**
- MIN – Aaron Jones 8-yard pass from Sam Darnold (Will Reichard kick), 1:08. Vikings 14–0. **Drive: 6 plays, 56 yards, 3:23.**

**Second quarter**

- No scoring plays.

**Third quarter**

- MIN – Jalen Nailor 4-yard pass from Sam Darnold (Will Reichard kick), 10:22. Vikings 21–0. **Drive: 8 plays, 77 yards, 4:38.**
- HOU – Cam Akers 8-yard pass from C. J. Stroud (Kaʻimi Fairbairn kick), 3:56. Vikings 21–7. **Drive: 7 plays, 72 yards, 3:31.**

**Fourth quarter**

- MIN – Will Reichard 35-yard field goal, 14:53. Vikings 24–7. **Drive: 10 plays, 43 yards, 4:03.**
- MIN – Johnny Mundt 2-yard pass from Sam Darnold (Will Reichard kick), 10:14. Vikings 31–7. **Drive: 7 plays, 53 yards, 3:47.**
- MIN – Will Reichard 58-yard field goal, 4:43. Vikings 34–7. **Drive: 6 plays, 15 yards, 3:06.**

**Top passers**

- HOU – C. J. Stroud – 20/31, 215 yards, TD, 2 INT
- MIN – Sam Darnold – 17/28, 181 yards, 4 TD

**Top rushers**

- HOU – Cam Akers – 9 rushes, 21 yards
- MIN – Aaron Jones – 19 rushes, 102 yards

**Top receivers**

- HOU – Stefon Diggs – 10 receptions, 94 yards
- MIN – Justin Jefferson – 6 receptions, 81 yards, TD

With this loss, the Houston Texans are 0–6 all-time against the Minnesota Vikings.

==== Week 4: vs. Jacksonville Jaguars ====
Week 4: Jacksonville Jaguars at Houston Texans – Game summary

| Quarter | 1 | 2 | 3 | 4 | Total |
|---|---|---|---|---|---|
| Jaguars | 10 | 3 | 7 | 0 | **20** |
| **Texans** | 7 | 10 | 0 | 7 | **24** |

at NRG Stadium, Houston, Texas

- Date: September 29
- Game time: 12:00 p.m. CDT
- Game weather: None (retractable roof closed)
- Game attendance: 71,115
- Referee: Tra Blake
- TV announcers (CBS): Andrew Catalon, Tiki Barber, Jason McCourty and A.J. Ross
- Recap, Game Book

Game information

**First quarter**

- JAX – Brian Thomas Jr. 2-yard pass from Trevor Lawrence (Cam Little kick), 12:44. Jaguars 7–0. **Drive: 1 play, 2 yards, 0:04.**
- HOU – Stefon Diggs 6-yard run (Kaʻimi Fairbairn kick), 7:23. Tied 7–7. **Drive: 9 plays, 70 yards, 5:21.**
- JAX – Cam Little 41-yard field goal, 2:41. Jaguars 10–7. **Drive: 9 plays, 54 yards, 4:42.**

**Second quarter**

- HOU – Nico Collins 3-yard pass from C. J. Stroud (Kaʻimi Fairbairn kick), 7:19. Texans 14–10. **Drive: 12 plays, 74 yards, 7:27.**
- JAX – Cam Little 52-yard field goal, 3:49. Texans 14–13. **Drive: 7 plays, 39 yards, 3:30.**
- HOU – Kaʻimi Fairbairn 30-yard field goal, 0:03. Texans 17–13. **Drive: 11 plays, 59 yards, 3:46.**

**Third quarter**

- JAX – Christian Kirk 8-yard pass from Trevor Lawrence (Cam Little kick), 6:16. Jaguars 20–17. **Drive: 7 plays, 74 yards, 4:00.**

**Fourth quarter**

- HOU – Dare Ogunbowale 1-yard pass from C. J. Stroud (Kaʻimi Fairbairn kick), 0:18. Texans 24–20. **Drive: 9 plays, 69 yards, 2:36.**

**Top passers**

- JAX – Trevor Lawrence – 18/33, 169 yards, 2 TD
- HOU – C. J. Stroud – 27/40, 345 yards, 2 TD

**Top rushers**

- JAX – Tank Bigsby – 7 rushes, 90 yards
- HOU – Cam Akers – 13 rushes, 53 yards

**Top receivers**

- JAX – Brian Thomas Jr. – 6 receptions, 86 yards, TD
- HOU – Nico Collins – 12 receptions, 151 yards, TD

A late touchdown pass from C. J. Stroud allowed the Texans to avoid the Jaguars' upset bid, improving to 3–1, their best start since 2016.

==== Week 5: vs. Buffalo Bills ====
Week 5: Buffalo Bills at Houston Texans – Game summary

| Quarter | 1 | 2 | 3 | 4 | Total |
|---|---|---|---|---|---|
| Bills | 3 | 0 | 14 | 3 | **20** |
| **Texans** | 14 | 3 | 3 | 3 | **23** |

at NRG Stadium, Houston, Texas

- Date: October 6
- Game time: 12:00 p.m. CDT
- Game weather: None (retractable roof closed)
- Game attendance: 71,427
- Referee: Clay Martin
- TV announcers (CBS): Ian Eagle, Charles Davis and Evan Washburn
- Recap, Game Book

Game information

**First quarter**

- BUF – Tyler Bass 38-yard field goal, 6:27. Bills 3–0. **Drive: 10 plays, 29 yards, 5:37.**
- HOU – Cam Akers 15-yard run (Kaʻimi Fairbairn kick), 2:55. Texans 7–3. **Drive: 6 plays, 70 yards, 3:32.**
- HOU – Nico Collins 67-yard pass from C. J. Stroud (Kaʻimi Fairbairn kick), 1:34. Texans 14–3. **Drive: 1 play, 67 yards, 0:09.**

**Second quarter**

- HOU – Kaʻimi Fairbairn 50-yard field goal, 0:00. Texans 17–3. **Drive: 6 plays, 19 yards, 0:30.**

**Third quarter**

- HOU – Kaʻimi Fairbairn 47-yard field goal, 11:15. Texans 20–3. **Drive: 8 plays, 41 yards, 3:45.**
- BUF – James Cook 5-yard run (Tyler Bass kick), 8:48. Texans 20–10. **Drive: 6 plays, 70 yards, 2:27.**
- BUF – Keon Coleman 49-yard pass from Josh Allen (Tyler Bass kick), 4:20. Texans 20–17. **Drive: 5 plays, 65 yards, 2:46.**

**Fourth quarter**

- BUF – Tyler Bass 33-yard field goal, 3:30. Tied 20–20. **Drive: 4 plays, 0 yards, 1:03.**
- HOU – Kaʻimi Fairbairn 59-yard field goal, 0:00. Texans 23–20. **Drive: 2 plays, 5 yards, 0:07.**

**Top passers**

- BUF – Josh Allen – 9/30, 131 yards, TD
- HOU – C. J. Stroud – 28/38, 331 yards, TD, INT

**Top rushers**

- BUF – James Cook – 20 rushes, 82 yards, TD
- HOU – Cam Akers – 9 rushes, 42 yards, TD

**Top receivers**

- BUF – Keon Coleman – 1 reception, 49 yards, TD
- HOU – Stefon Diggs – 6 receptions, 82 yards

Buffalo rallied from a 20–3 deficit to tie the game late in the 4th quarter; however, after three straight incompletions by Josh Allen from his own 1-yard line, Buffalo was forced to punt and Houston took advantage of the field position to convert Ka'imi Fairbairn's game-winning 59-yard field goal. This improved the Texans to 4–1, their best start since a 5–0 start in 2012.

==== Week 6: at New England Patriots ====
Week 6: Houston Texans at New England Patriots – Game summary

| Quarter | 1 | 2 | 3 | 4 | Total |
|---|---|---|---|---|---|
| **Texans** | 14 | 0 | 13 | 14 | **41** |
| Patriots | 0 | 7 | 7 | 7 | **21** |

at Gillette Stadium, Foxborough, Massachusetts

- Date: October 13
- Game time: 1:00 p.m. EDT/12:00 p.m. CDT
- Game weather: Cloudy, 56 °F (13 °C)
- Game attendance: 64,628
- Referee: Ronald Torbert
- TV announcers (CBS): Kevin Harlan, Trent Green and Melanie Collins
- Recap, Game Book

Game information

**First quarter**

- HOU – Tank Dell 2-yard pass from C. J. Stroud (Kaʻimi Fairbairn kick), 9:13. Texans 7–0. **Drive: 11 plays, 65 yards, 5:47.**
- HOU – Joe Mixon 10-yard pass from C. J. Stroud (Kaʻimi Fairbairn kick), 3:13. Texans 14–0. **Drive: 8 plays, 45 yards, 4:21.**

**Second quarter**

- NE – Kayshon Boutte 40-yard pass from Drake Maye (Joey Slye kick), 0:11. Texans 14–7. **Drive: 5 plays, 84 yards, 0:48.**

**Third quarter**

- HOU – Stefon Diggs 10-yard pass from C. J. Stroud (Kaʻimi Fairbairn kick), 13:28. Texans 21–7. **Drive: 2 plays, 10 yards, 0:42.**
- HOU – Kaʻimi Fairbairn 39-yard field goal, 6:56. Texans 24–7. **Drive: 10 plays, 59 yards, 5:02.**
- HOU – Kaʻimi Fairbairn 46-yard field goal, 5:22. Texans 27–7. **Drive: 4 plays, 3 yards, 1:20.**
- NE – Hunter Henry 6-yard pass from Drake Maye (Joey Slye kick), 1:00. Texans 27–14. **Drive: 7 plays, 70 yards, 4:22.**

**Fourth quarter**

- HOU – Joe Mixon 20-yard run (Kaʻimi Fairbairn kick), 13:14. Texans 34–14. **Drive: 2 plays, 26 yards, 0:49.**
- NE – Demario Douglas 35-yard pass from Drake Maye (Joey Slye kick), 9:24. Texans 34–21. **Drive: 8 plays, 70 yards, 3:50.**
- HOU – Dameon Pierce 54-yard run (Kaʻimi Fairbairn kick), 7:47. Texans 41–21. **Drive: 4 plays, 70 yards, 1:37.**

**Top passers**

- HOU – C. J. Stroud – 20/31, 192 yards, 3 TD, INT
- NE – Drake Maye – 20/33, 243 yards, 3 TD, 2 INT

**Top rushers**

- HOU – Joe Mixon – 13 rushes, 102 yards, TD
- NE – Drake Maye – 5 rushes, 38 yards

**Top receivers**

- HOU – Stefon Diggs – 6 receptions, 77 yards, TD
- NE – Demario Douglas – 6 receptions, 92 yards, TD

This game marked the Texans first win in Foxborough in franchise history. They were previously 0–5 in the regular season and 0–2 in the playoffs against the Patriots in Foxborough.

==== Week 7: at Green Bay Packers ====
Week 7: Houston Texans at Green Bay Packers – Game summary

| Quarter | 1 | 2 | 3 | 4 | Total |
|---|---|---|---|---|---|
| Texans | 3 | 16 | 0 | 3 | **22** |
| **Packers** | 0 | 14 | 7 | 3 | **24** |

at Lambeau Field, Green Bay, Wisconsin

- Date: October 20
- Game time: 12:00 p.m. CDT
- Game weather: Sunny, 70 °F (21 °C)
- Game attendance: 78,197
- Referee: Scott Novak
- TV announcers (CBS): Jim Nantz, Tony Romo and Tracy Wolfson
- Recap, Game Book

Game information

**First quarter**

- HOU – Kaʻimi Fairbairn 23-yard field goal, 11:48. Texans 3–0. **Drive: 4 plays, 6 yards, 1:00.**

**Second quarter**

- GB – Tucker Kraft 14-yard pass from Jordan Love (Brandon McManus kick), 13:16. Packers 7–3. **Drive: 13 plays, 92 yards, 6:50.**
- HOU – Joe Mixon 2-yard run (Kaʻimi Fairbairn kick), 11:52. Texans 10–7. **Drive: 2 plays, 11 yards, 0:37.**
- GB – Dontayvion Wicks 30-yard pass from Jordan Love (Brandon McManus kick), 8:51. Packers 14–10. **Drive: 6 plays, 70 yards, 3:01.**
- HOU – Kaʻimi Fairbairn 52-yard field goal, 4:30. Packers 14–13. **Drive: 9 plays, 23 yards, 4:21.**
- HOU – Joe Mixon 4-yard run (run failed), 1:13. Texans 19–14. **Drive: 5 plays, 55 yards, 3:05.**

**Third quarter**

- GB – Josh Jacobs 8-yard pass from Jordan Love (Brandon McManus kick), 7:25. Packers 21–19. **Drive: 9 plays, 71 yards, 5:22.**

**Fourth quarter**

- HOU – Kaʻimi Fairbairn 35-yard field goal, 1:52. Texans 22–21. **Drive: 13 plays, 45 yards, 6:27.**
- GB – Brandon McManus 45-yard field goal, 0:03. Packers 24–22. **Drive: 7 plays, 44 yards, 1:41.**

**Top passers**

- HOU – C. J. Stroud – 10/21, 86 yards
- GB – Jordan Love – 24/33, 220 yards, 3 TD, 2 INT

**Top rushers**

- HOU – Joe Mixon – 25 rushes, 115 yards, 2 TD
- GB – Josh Jacobs – 12 rushes, 76 yards

**Top receivers**

- HOU – Dalton Schultz – 1 reception, 28 yards
- GB – Romeo Doubs – 8 receptions, 95 yards

Despite forcing three turnovers in the first half, the Texans were unable to pull away, and the Packers were able to win on a last-second field goal. With the loss, the Texans dropped to 5–2, as well as being 1–5 all-time against the Packers.

==== Week 8: vs. Indianapolis Colts ====
Week 8: Indianapolis Colts at Houston Texans – Game summary

| Quarter | 1 | 2 | 3 | 4 | Total |
|---|---|---|---|---|---|
| Colts | 10 | 0 | 3 | 7 | **20** |
| **Texans** | 3 | 14 | 3 | 3 | **23** |

at NRG Stadium, Houston, Texas

- Date: October 27
- Game time: 12:00 p.m. CDT
- Game weather: None (retractable roof closed)
- Game attendance: 71,380
- Referee: Brad Allen
- TV announcers (CBS): Andrew Catalon, Tiki Barber and A.J. Ross
- Recap, Game Book

Game information

**First quarter**

- HOU – Kaʻimi Fairbairn 35-yard field goal, 11:15. Texans 3–0. **Drive: 9 plays, 41 yards, 3:45.**
- IND – Matt Gay 46-yard field goal, 10:00. Tied 3–3. **Drive: 6 plays, 12 yards, 1:15.**
- IND – Josh Downs 69-yard pass from Anthony Richardson (Matt Gay kick), 0:50. Colts 10–3. **Drive: 4 plays, 81 yards, 2:12.**

**Second quarter**

- HOU – Joe Mixon 14-yard run (Kaʻimi Fairbairn kick), 10:04. Tied 10–10. **Drive: 10 plays, 70 yards, 5:46.**
- HOU – Tank Dell 7-yard pass from C. J. Stroud (Kaʻimi Fairbairn kick), 0:17. Texans 17–10. **Drive: 1 play, 7 yards, 0:06.**

**Third quarter**

- HOU – Kaʻimi Fairbairn 35-yard field goal, 7:52. Texans 20–10. **Drive: 8 plays, 76 yards, 3:27.**
- IND – Matt Gay 37-yard field goal, 2:01. Texans 20–13. **Drive: 10 plays, 52 yards, 5:51.**

**Fourth quarter**

- HOU – Kaʻimi Fairbairn 34-yard field goal, 12:21. Texans 23–13. **Drive: 9 plays, 54 yards, 4:40.**
- IND – Jonathan Taylor 1-yard run (Matt Gay kick), 8:32. Texans 23–20. **Drive: 11 plays, 70 yards, 3:49.**

**Top passers**

- IND – Anthony Richardson – 10/32, 175 yards, TD, INT
- HOU – C. J. Stroud – 25/37, 285 yards, TD

**Top rushers**

- IND – Jonathan Taylor – 20 rushes, 105 yards, TD
- HOU – Joe Mixon – 25 rushes, 102 yards, TD

**Top receiver**

- IND – Josh Downs – 4 receptions, 109 yards, TD
- HOU – Stefon Diggs – 5 receptions, 81 yards

With this win, the Texans swept the Colts for the first time since 2016, and improved to 6–2, two games clear of the Colts (with the head-to-head tiebreaker) in the division race.

==== Week 9: at New York Jets ====
Week 9: Houston Texans at New York Jets – Game summary

| Quarter | 1 | 2 | 3 | 4 | Total |
|---|---|---|---|---|---|
| Texans | 0 | 7 | 3 | 3 | **13** |
| **Jets** | 0 | 0 | 7 | 14 | **21** |

at MetLife Stadium, East Rutherford, New Jersey

- Date: October 31
- Game time: 8:15 p.m. EDT/7:15 p.m. CDT
- Game weather: Cloudy, 71 °F (22 °C)
- Game attendance: 79,818
- Referee: Shawn Hochuli
- TV announcers (KRIV-TV/Prime Video): Al Michaels, Kirk Herbstreit and Kaylee Hartung
- Recap, Game Book

Game information

**First quarter**

- No scoring plays.

**Second quarter**

- HOU – Joe Mixon 3-yard run (Kaʻimi Fairbairn kick), 3:21. Texans 7–0. **Drive: 14 plays, 98 yards, 8:23.**

**Third quarter**

- NYJ – Garrett Wilson 21-yard pass from Aaron Rodgers (Riley Patterson kick), 9:03. Tied 7–7. **Drive: 11 plays, 70 yards, 5:57.**
- HOU – Kaʻimi Fairbairn 54-yard field goal, 4:11. Texans 10–7. **Drive: 9 plays, 20 yards, 4:52.**

**Fourth quarter**

- NYJ – Garrett Wilson 26-yard pass from Aaron Rodgers (Riley Patterson kick), 12:54. Jets 14–10. **Drive: 12 plays, 70 yards, 6:17.**
- NYJ – Davante Adams 37-yard pass from Aaron Rodgers (Riley Patterson kick), 2:56. Jets 21–10. **Drive: 8 plays, 80 yards, 3:58.**
- HOU – Kaʻimi Fairbairn 29-yard field goal, 0:39. Jets 21–13. **Drive: 15 plays, 59 yards, 2:17.**

**Top passers**

- HOU – C. J. Stroud – 11/30, 191 yards
- NYJ – Aaron Rodgers – 22/32, 211 yards, 2 TD

**Top rushers**

- HOU – Joe Mixon – 24 rushes, 106 yards, TD
- NYJ – Breece Hall – 15 rushes, 74 yards

**Top receivers**

- HOU – Tank Dell – 6 receptions, 126 yards
- NYJ – Davante Adams – 7 receptions, 91 yards, TD

With the loss, the Texans fell to 6–3 and lost their third straight game against the Jets.

==== Week 10: vs. Detroit Lions ====
Week 10: Detroit Lions at Houston Texans – Game summary

| Quarter | 1 | 2 | 3 | 4 | Total |
|---|---|---|---|---|---|
| **Lions** | 0 | 7 | 6 | 13 | **26** |
| Texans | 10 | 13 | 0 | 0 | **23** |

at NRG Stadium, Houston, Texas

- Date: November 10
- Game time: 7:20 p.m. CST
- Game weather: Clear, 73 °F (23 °C) (retractable roof open)
- Game attendance: 71,512
- Referee: Bill Vinovich
- TV announcers (NBC): Mike Tirico, Cris Collinsworth and Melissa Stark
- Recap, Game Book

Game information

**First quarter**

- HOU – Joe Mixon 8-yard run (Kaʻimi Fairbairn kick), 7:46. Texans 7–0. **Drive: 8 plays, 33 yards, 5:09.**
- HOU – Kaʻimi Fairbairn 34-yard field goal, 2:09. Texans 10–0. **Drive: 8 plays, 41 yards, 4:13.**

**Second quarter**

- DET – Sam LaPorta 20-yard pass from Jared Goff (Jake Bates kick), 10:52. Texans 10–7. **Drive: 11 plays, 70 yards, 6:17.**
- HOU – Kaʻimi Fairbairn 56-yard field goal, 8:25. Texans 13–7. **Drive: 5 plays, 32 yards, 2:27.**
- HOU – Kaʻimi Fairbairn 29-yard field goal, 4:07. Texans 16–7. **Drive: 8 plays, 25 yards, 3:27.**
- HOU – John Metchie III 15-yard pass from C. J. Stroud (Kaʻimi Fairbairn kick), 0:12. Texans 23–7. **Drive: 6 plays, 66 yards, 0:42.**

**Third quarter**

- DET – David Montgomery 3-yard run (run failed), 11:34. Texans 23–13. **Drive: 3 plays, 44 yards, 1:10.**

**Fourth quarter**

- DET – Amon-Ra St. Brown 9-yard pass from Jared Goff (Jake Bates kick), 11:38. Texans 23–20. **Drive: 7 plays, 64 yards, 3:11.**
- DET – Jake Bates 58-yard field goal, 5:01. Tied 23–23. **Drive: 7 plays, 43 yards, 3:20.**
- DET – Jake Bates 52-yard field goal, 0:00. Lions 26–23. **Drive: 6 plays, 18 yards, 1:51.**

**Top passers**

- DET – Jared Goff – 15/30, 240 yards, 2 TD, 5 INT
- HOU – C. J. Stroud – 19/33, 232 yards, TD, 2 INT

**Top rushers**

- DET – Jahmyr Gibbs – 19 rushes, 71 yards
- HOU – Joe Mixon – 25 rushes, 46 yards, TD

**Top receivers**

- DET – Sam LaPorta – 3 receptions, 66 yards, TD
- HOU – John Metchie III – 5 receptions, 74 yards, TD

The Texans, primarily from their defense which intercepted Lions quarterback Jared Goff five times, built a 23–7 halftime lead; however, their offense continued its second half struggles, and the Lions rallied with 19 unanswered points, winning it on a walk-off field goal from Jake Bates. With the loss, the Texans fell to 6–4.

==== Week 11: at Dallas Cowboys ====
Week 11: Houston Texans at Dallas Cowboys – Game summary

| Quarter | 1 | 2 | 3 | 4 | Total |
|---|---|---|---|---|---|
| **Texans** | 14 | 3 | 3 | 14 | **34** |
| Cowboys | 0 | 10 | 0 | 0 | **10** |

at AT&T Stadium, Arlington, Texas

- Date: November 18
- Game time: 7:15 p.m. CST
- Game weather: None (retractable roof closed)
- Game attendance: 92,969
- Referee: Craig Wrolstad
- TV announcers (ESPN/ABC): Joe Buck, Troy Aikman, Lisa Salters and Laura Rutledge
- Recap, Game Book

Game information

**First quarter**

- HOU – Joe Mixon 45-yard run (Kaʻimi Fairbairn kick), 12:42. Texans 7–0. **Drive: 6 plays, 77 yards, 2:18.**
- HOU – Joe Mixon 1-yard run (Kaʻimi Fairbairn kick), 0:49. Texans 14–0. **Drive: 10 plays, 63 yards, 5:00.**

**Second quarter**

- DAL – KaVontae Turpin 64-yard pass from Cooper Rush (Brandon Aubrey kick), 14:51. Texans 14–7. **Drive: 3 plays, 64 yards, 0:58.**
- HOU – Kaʻimi Fairbairn 33-yard field goal, 9:10. Texans 17–7. **Drive: 9 plays, 77 yards, 5:41.**
- DAL – Brandon Aubrey 53-yard field goal, 5:55. Texans 17–10. **Drive: 8 plays, 35 yards, 3:15.**

**Third quarter**

- HOU – Kaʻimi Fairbairn 29-yard field goal, 7:05. Texans 20–10. **Drive: 10 plays, 65 yards, 5:47.**

**Fourth quarter**

- HOU – Derek Barnett 28-yard fumble return (Kaʻimi Fairbairn kick), 12:31. Texans 27–10.
- HOU – Joe Mixon 1-yard run (Kaʻimi Fairbairn kick), 3:16. Texans 34–10. **Drive: 6 plays, 35 yards, 2:50.**

**Top passers**

- HOU – C. J. Stroud – 23/34, 257 yards, INT
- DAL – Cooper Rush – 32/55, 354 yards, TD, INT

**Top rushers**

- HOU – Joe Mixon – 20 rushes, 109 yards, 3 TD
- DAL – Rico Dowdle – 10 rushes, 28 yards

**Top receivers**

- HOU – Nico Collins – 4 receptions, 54 yards
- DAL – CeeDee Lamb – 8 receptions, 93 yards

This game marked the Texans first win against the Cowboys at AT&T Stadium in franchise history. They were previously 0–2 against the Cowboys at AT&T Stadium and 0–3 on the road against the Cowboys in franchise history, as they lost the only game they played against the Cowboys at Texas Stadium in 2006. The Texans also snapped their 4-game streak without scoring a touchdown in the second half, improving to 7–4.

==== Week 12: vs. Tennessee Titans ====
Week 12: Tennessee Titans at Houston Texans – Game summary

| Quarter | 1 | 2 | 3 | 4 | Total |
|---|---|---|---|---|---|
| **Titans** | 10 | 10 | 3 | 9 | **32** |
| Texans | 7 | 10 | 7 | 3 | **27** |

at NRG Stadium, Houston, Texas

- Date: November 24
- Game time: 12:00 p.m. CST
- Game weather: None (retractable roof closed)
- Game attendance: 71,055
- Referee: Brad Rogers
- TV announcers (CBS): Tom McCarthy, Jay Feely, Ross Tucker and Amanda Balionis
- Recap, Game Book

Game information

**First quarter**

- HOU – Cade Stover 19-yard pass from C. J. Stroud (Kaʻimi Fairbairn kick), 14:42. Texans 7–0. **Drive: 1 play, 19 yards, 0:18.**
- TEN – Nick Folk 51-yard field goal, 11:15. Texans 7–3. **Drive: 6 plays, 28 yards, 3:27.**
- TEN – Nick Westbrook-Ikhine 38-yard pass from Will Levis (Nick Folk kick), 1:57. Titans 10–7. **Drive: 10 plays, 89 yards, 5:59.**

**Second quarter**

- TEN – Tony Pollard 10-yard run (Nick Folk kick), 11:03. Titans 17–7. **Drive: 6 plays, 95 yards, 3:44.**
- HOU – Nico Collins 5-yard pass from C. J. Stroud (Kaʻimi Fairbairn kick), 6:17. Titans 17–14. **Drive: 10 plays, 78 yards, 4:46.**
- HOU – Kaʻimi Fairbairn 28-yard field goal, 1:47. Tied 17–17. **Drive: 5 plays, 55 yards, 1:37.**
- TEN – Nick Folk 56-yard field goal, 0:00. Titans 20–17. **Drive: 4 plays, -18 yards, 0:37.**

**Third quarter**

- TEN – Nick Folk 51-yard field goal, 9:08. Titans 23–17. **Drive: 11 plays, 41 yards, 5:52.**
- HOU – Jimmie Ward 65-yard interception return (Kaʻimi Fairbairn kick), 0:04. Texans 24–23.

**Fourth quarter**

- HOU – Kaʻimi Fairbairn 54-yard field goal, 9:46. Texans 27–23. **Drive: 4 plays, 7 yards, 1:38.**
- TEN – Chig Okonkwo 70-yard pass from Will Levis (Nick Folk kick), 9:35. Titans 30–27. **Drive: 1 play, 70 yards, 0:11.**
- TEN – C. J. Stroud sacked in the end zone for a safety, 1:13. Titans 32–27.

**Top passers**

- TEN – Will Levis – 18/24, 278 yards, 2 TD, INT
- HOU – C. J. Stroud – 20/33, 247 yards, 2 TD, 2 INT

**Top rushers**

- TEN – Tony Pollard – 24 rushes, 119 yards, TD
- HOU – Joe Mixon – 14 rushes, 22 yards

**Top receivers**

- TEN – Calvin Ridley – 5 receptions, 93 yards
- HOU – Nico Collins – 5 receptions, 92 yards, TD

Ka'imi Fairbairn missed a 30-yard field goal that would have tied the game just after the two-minute warning; the Texans got the ball back one more time, but C. J. Stroud ran out of the end zone for a safety, similar to Dan Orlovsky's infamous play against the Vikings. With the upset loss, the Texans fell to 7–5. This was their only division loss of the season and is also the last time the Titans defeated the Texans as of 2026.

==== Week 13: at Jacksonville Jaguars ====
Week 13: Houston Texans at Jacksonville Jaguars – Game summary

| Quarter | 1 | 2 | 3 | 4 | Total |
|---|---|---|---|---|---|
| **Texans** | 0 | 6 | 10 | 7 | **23** |
| Jaguars | 0 | 3 | 3 | 14 | **20** |

at EverBank Stadium, Jacksonville, Florida

- Date: December 1
- Game time: 1:00 p.m. EST/12:00 p.m. CST
- Game weather: 56 °F (13 °C)
- Game attendance: 62,588
- Referee: Land Clark
- TV announcers (Fox): Kevin Kugler, Daryl Johnston and Laura Okmin
- Recap, Game Book

Game information

**First quarter**

- No scoring plays.

**Second quarter**

- HOU – Kaʻimi Fairbairn 53-yard field goal, 14:51. Texans 3–0. **Drive: 5 plays, 40 yards, 2:06.**
- HOU – Kaʻimi Fairbairn 30-yard field goal, 6:26. Texans 6–0. **Drive: 11 plays, 33 yards, 6:51.**
- JAX – Cam Little 33-yard field goal, 0:08. Texans 6–3. **Drive: 14 plays, 53 yards, 6:18.**

**Third quarter**

- JAX – Cam Little 30-yard field goal, 10:06. Tied 6–6. **Drive: 9 plays, 68 yards, 3:24.**
- HOU – Joe Mixon 7-yard run (Kaʻimi Fairbairn kick), 8:04. Texans 13–6. **Drive: 5 plays, 70 yards, 2:02.**
- HOU – Kaʻimi Fairbairn 28-yard field goal, 1:16. Texans 16–6. **Drive: 10 plays, 41 yards, 4:56.**

**Fourth quarter**

- HOU – Dalton Schultz 22-yard pass from C. J. Stroud (Kaʻimi Fairbairn kick), 12:11. Texans 23–6. **Drive: 5 plays, 55 yards, 1:46.**
- JAX – Parker Washington 22-yard pass from Mac Jones (pass failed), 7:49. Texans 23–12. **Drive: 12 plays, 72 yards, 4:22.**
- JAX – Brian Thomas Jr. 6-yard pass from Mac Jones (Mac Jones–Parker Washington pass), 3:31. Texans 23–20. **Drive: 10 plays, 84 yards, 2:26.**

**Top passers**

- HOU – C. J. Stroud – 22/34, 242 yards, TD
- JAX – Mac Jones – 20/32, 235 yards, 2 TD

**Top rushers**

- HOU – Joe Mixon – 20 rushes, 101 yards, TD
- JAX – Travis Etienne – 13 rushes, 46 yards

**Top receivers**

- HOU – Nico Collins – 8 receptions, 119 yards
- JAX – Parker Washington – 6 receptions, 103 yards, TD

During the second quarter, Texans linebacker Azeez Al-Shaair made an illegal hit on Jaguars quarterback Trevor Lawrence. The hit and subsequent brawl between Al-Shaair and several Jaguars players resulted in Al-Shaair being suspended for three games. The Texans held off a late rally by the Jaguars to improve to 8–5 and swept the season series for the first time since 2021, winning their seventh straight away game against the Jaguars.

==== Week 15: vs. Miami Dolphins ====
Week 15: Miami Dolphins at Houston Texans – Game summary

| Quarter | 1 | 2 | 3 | 4 | Total |
|---|---|---|---|---|---|
| Dolphins | 0 | 6 | 6 | 0 | **12** |
| **Texans** | 3 | 10 | 7 | 0 | **20** |

at NRG Stadium, Houston, Texas

- Date: December 15
- Game time: 12:00 p.m. CST
- Game weather: None (retractable roof closed)
- Game attendance: 71,221
- Referee: Alex Kemp
- TV announcers (CBS): Kevin Harlan, Trent Green and Melanie Collins
- Recap, Game Book

Game information

**First quarter**

- HOU – Kaʻimi Fairbairn 44-yard field goal, 7:09. Texans 3–0. **Drive: 8 plays, 55 yards, 4:11.**

**Second quarter**

- MIA – Jason Sanders 55-yard field goal, 11:35. Tied 3–3. **Drive: 12 plays, 45 yards, 7:40.**
- HOU – Nico Collins 6-yard pass from C. J. Stroud (Kaʻimi Fairbairn kick), 6:45. Texans 10–3. **Drive: 4 plays, 28 yards, 2:40.**
- MIA – Jason Sanders 36-yard field goal, 1:57. Texans 10–6. **Drive: 10 plays, 52 yards, 4:48.**
- HOU – Kaʻimi Fairbairn 23-yard field goal, 0:00. Texans 13–6. **Drive: 3 plays, 0 yards, 0:13.**

**Third quarter**

- HOU – Nico Collins 6-yard pass from C. J. Stroud (Ka'im Fairbairn kick), 11:02. Texans 20–6. **Drive: 9 plays, 70 yards, 3:58.**
- MIA – Jonnu Smith 7-yard pass from Tua Tagovailoa (kick failed, wide left), 4:30. Texans 20–12. **Drive: 11 plays, 73 yards, 6:32.**

**Fourth quarter**

- No scoring plays.

**Top passers**

- MIA – Tua Tagovailoa – 29/40, 196 yards, TD, 3 INT
- HOU – C. J. Stroud – 18/26, 131 yards, 2 TD

**Top rushers**

- MIA – De'Von Achane – 12 rushes, 41 yards
- HOU – Dare Ogunbowale – 1 rush, 35 yards

**Top receivers**

- MIA – Malik Washington – 5 receptions, 52 yards
- HOU – Joe Mixon – 5 receptions, 33 yards

With the win and the Colts losing to the Broncos later in the day, the Texans clinched the AFC South for the second straight season.

==== Week 16: at Kansas City Chiefs ====
Week 16: Houston Texans at Kansas City Chiefs – Game summary

| Quarter | 1 | 2 | 3 | 4 | Total |
|---|---|---|---|---|---|
| Texans | 3 | 7 | 6 | 3 | **19** |
| **Chiefs** | 7 | 10 | 7 | 3 | **27** |

at Arrowhead Stadium, Kansas City, Missouri

- Date: December 21
- Game time: 12:00 p.m. CST
- Game weather: 30 °F (−1 °C)
- Game attendance: 73,600
- Referee: Carl Cheffers
- TV announcers (NBC): Noah Eagle, Todd Blackledge and Kathryn Tappen
- Recap, Game Book

Game information

**First quarter**

- KC – Patrick Mahomes 15-yard run (Harrison Butker kick), 6:31. Chiefs 7–0. **Drive: 11 plays, 66 yards, 6:26.**
- HOU – Kaʻimi Fairbairn 33-yard field goal, 3:08. Chiefs 7–3. **Drive: 7 plays, 55 yards, 3:23.**

**Second quarter**

- HOU – Dalton Schultz 10-yard pass from C. J. Stroud (Kaʻimi Fairbairn kick), 10:09. Texans 10–7. **Drive: 13 plays, 82 yards, 6:05.**
- KC – Kareem Hunt 3-yard run (Harrison Butker kick), 4:38. Chiefs 14–10. **Drive: 13 plays, 82 yards, 5:31.**
- KC – Harrison Butker 44-yard field goal, 0:19. Chiefs 17–10. **Drive: 5 plays, 39 yards, 0:33.**

**Third quarter**

- HOU – Tank Dell 30-yard pass from C. J. Stroud (kick failed, wide right), 11:40. Chiefs 17–16. **Drive: 4 plays, 50 yards, 1:36.**
- KC – Xavier Worthy 8-yard pass from Patrick Mahomes (Harrison Butker kick), 2:42. Chiefs 24–16. **Drive: 10 plays, 80 yards, 5:44.**

**Fourth quarter**

- HOU – Kaʻimi Fairbairn 38-yard field goal, 11:51. Chiefs 24–19. **Drive: 14 plays, 50 yards, 5:51.**
- KC – Harrison Butker 27-yard field goal, 5:18. Chiefs 27–19. **Drive: 14 plays, 60 yards, 6:33.**

**Top passers**

- HOU – C. J. Stroud – 23/39, 244 yards, 2 TD, 2 INT
- KC – Patrick Mahomes – 28/41, 260 yards, TD

**Top rushers**

- HOU – Joe Mixon – 14 rushes, 57 yards
- KC – Kareem Hunt – 11 rushes, 55 yards, TD

**Top receivers**

- HOU – Tank Dell – 6 receptions, 98 yards, TD
- KC – Xavier Worthy – 7 receptions, 65 yards, TD

Tank Dell was lost for the season with a broken leg on a touchdown catch from C.J. Stroud in the 3rd quarter.

==== Week 17: vs. Baltimore Ravens ====
Christmas Day games

Week 17: Baltimore Ravens at Houston Texans – Game summary

| Quarter | 1 | 2 | 3 | 4 | Total |
|---|---|---|---|---|---|
| **Ravens** | 10 | 7 | 14 | 0 | **31** |
| Texans | 0 | 2 | 0 | 0 | **2** |

at NRG Stadium, Houston, Texas

- Date: December 25
- Game time: 3:30 p.m. CST
- Game weather: None (retractable roof closed)
- Game attendance: 71,544
- Referee: Alan Eck
- TV announcers (KHOU/Netflix): Noah Eagle, Greg Olsen, Jamie Erdahl and Steve Wyche
  Game exclusive to KHOU through syndication. Out of market on Netflix.
- Recap, Game Book

Game information

**First quarter**

- BAL – Derrick Henry 2-yard run (Justin Tucker kick), 10:08. Ravens 7–0. **Drive: 8 plays, 75 yards, 4:52.**
- BAL – Justin Tucker 52-yard field goal, 2:47. Ravens 10–0. **Drive: 7 plays, 36 yards, 3:25.**

**Second quarter**

- HOU – Derrick Henry tackled in the end zone for a safety, 10:09. Ravens 10–2.
- BAL – Isaiah Likely 9-yard pass from Lamar Jackson (Justin Tucker kick), 1:51. Ravens 17–2. **Drive: 6 plays, 99 yards, 3:40.**

**Third quarter**

- BAL – Lamar Jackson 48-yard run (Justin Tucker kick), 13:22. Ravens 24–2. **Drive: 2 plays, 61 yards, 0:44.**
- BAL – Mark Andrews 1-yard pass from Lamar Jackson (Justin Tucker kick), 5:50. Ravens 31–2. **Drive: 10 plays, 62 yards, 5:31.**

**Fourth quarter**

- No scoring plays.

**Top passers**

- BAL – Lamar Jackson – 10/15, 168 yards, 2 TD
- HOU – C. J. Stroud – 17/31, 185 yards, INT

**Top rushers**

- BAL – Derrick Henry – 27 rushes, 147 yards, TD
- HOU – Joe Mixon – 9 rushes, 26 yards

**Top receivers**

- BAL – Mark Andrews – 2 receptions, 68 yards, TD
- HOU – Nico Collins – 3 receptions, 59 yards

In an ugly performance, the Texans offense got nothing going against the Ravens and were shut out, though they managed a safety on a tackle of Derrick Henry in the endzone in the 2nd quarter.

==== Week 18: at Tennessee Titans ====
Week 18: Houston Texans at Tennessee Titans – Game summary

| Quarter | 1 | 2 | 3 | 4 | Total |
|---|---|---|---|---|---|
| **Texans** | 7 | 9 | 0 | 7 | **23** |
| Titans | 0 | 3 | 3 | 8 | **14** |

at Nissan Stadium, Nashville, Tennessee

- Date: January 5
- Game time: 12:00 p.m. CST
- Game weather: Cloudy, 35 °F (2 °C)
- Game attendance: 61,815
- Referee: Brad Allen
- TV announcers (CBS): Tom McCarthy, Jay Feely, Ross Tucker and Amanda Balionis
- Recap, Game Book

Game information

**First quarter**

- HOU – Nico Collins 2-yard pass from C. J. Stroud (Ka'imi Fairbairn kick), 7:43. Texans 7–0. **Drive: 11 plays, 69 yards, 7:17.**

**Second quarter**

- HOU – Dameon Pierce 92-yard run (kick failed), 13:55. Texans 13–0. **Drive: 1 play, 92 yards, 0:12.**
- TEN – Matthew Wright 35-yard field goal, 1:41. Texans 13–3. **Drive: 11 plays, 53 yards, 4:55.**
- HOU – Ka'imi Fairbairn 27-yard field goal, 0:00. Texans 16–3. **Drive: 7 plays, 51 yards, 1:41.**

**Third quarter**

- TEN – Matthew Wright 38-yard field goal, 6:47. Texans 16–6. **Drive: 13 plays, 53 yards, 8:13.**

**Fourth quarter**

- HOU – Derek Barnett 36-yard fumble recovery for a touchdown (Ka'imi Fairbairn kick), 13:50. Texans 23–6.
- TEN – Tay Martin 49-yard pass from Will Levis (Will Levis-Josh Whyle pass), 2:41. Texans 23–14. **Drive: 9 plays, 94 yards, 3:00.**

**Top passers**

- HOU – Davis Mills – 12/22, 128 yards
- TEN – Will Levis – 9/17, 175 yards, TD

**Top rushers**

- HOU – Dameon Pierce – 19 rushes, 176 yards, TD
- TEN – Tony Pollard – 22 rushes, 62 yards

**Top receivers**

- HOU – Robert Woods – 2 receptions, 39 yards
- TEN – Calvin Ridley – 3 receptions, 76 yards

With the win, the Texans finished the season 10–7 and won their fourth straight game against the Titans in Nashville.

=== Standings ===
==== Division ====
AFC South
| | W | L | T | PCT | DIV | CONF | PF | PA | STK |
|---|---|---|---|---|---|---|---|---|---|
| ^{(4)} Houston Texans | 10 | 7 | 0 | .588 | 5–1 | 8–4 | 372 | 372 | W1 |
| Indianapolis Colts | 8 | 9 | 0 | .471 | 3–3 | 7–5 | 377 | 427 | W1 |
| Jacksonville Jaguars | 4 | 13 | 0 | .235 | 3–3 | 4–8 | 320 | 435 | L1 |
| Tennessee Titans | 3 | 14 | 0 | .176 | 1–5 | 3–9 | 311 | 460 | L6 |

==== Conference ====
AFC
| Seed | Team | Division | W | L | T | PCT | DIV | CONF | SOS | SOV | STK |
|---|---|---|---|---|---|---|---|---|---|---|---|
**Division leaders**
| 1 | Kansas City Chiefs | West | 15 | 2 | 0 | .882 | 5–1 | 10–2 | .488 | .463 | L1 |
| 2 | Buffalo Bills | East | 13 | 4 | 0 | .765 | 5–1 | 9–3 | .467 | .448 | L1 |
| 3 | Baltimore Ravens | North | 12 | 5 | 0 | .706 | 4–2 | 8–4 | .529 | .525 | W4 |
| 4 | Houston Texans | South | 10 | 7 | 0 | .588 | 5–1 | 8–4 | .481 | .376 | W1 |
**Wild cards**
| 5 | Los Angeles Chargers | West | 11 | 6 | 0 | .647 | 4–2 | 8–4 | .467 | .348 | W3 |
| 6 (Note: Pittsburgh clinched the #6 seed over Denver based on head-to-head victory.) | Pittsburgh Steelers | North | 10 | 7 | 0 | .588 | 3–3 | 7–5 | .502 | .453 | L4 |
| 7 | Denver Broncos | West | 10 | 7 | 0 | .588 | 3–3 | 6–6 | .502 | .394 | W1 |
**Did not qualify for the postseason**
| 8 | Cincinnati Bengals | North | 9 | 8 | 0 | .529 | 3–3 | 6–6 | .478 | .314 | W5 |
| 9 (Note: Indianapolis finished ahead of Miami based on head-to-head victory.) | Indianapolis Colts | South | 8 | 9 | 0 | .471 | 3–3 | 7–5 | .457 | .309 | W1 |
| 10 | Miami Dolphins | East | 8 | 9 | 0 | .471 | 3–3 | 6–6 | .419 | .294 | L1 |
| 11 | New York Jets | East | 5 | 12 | 0 | .294 | 2–4 | 5–7 | .495 | .341 | W1 |
| 12 (Note: Jacksonville finished ahead of New England and Las Vegas based on conference record. (Jacksonville 4–8 to New England 3–9 to Las Vegas 3–9)) | Jacksonville Jaguars | South | 4 | 13 | 0 | .235 | 3–3 | 4–8 | .478 | .265 | L1 |
| 13 (Note: New England finished ahead of Las Vegas based on strength of victory. (New England .471 to Las Vegas .353)) | New England Patriots | East | 4 | 13 | 0 | .235 | 2–4 | 3–9 | .471 | .471 | W1 |
| 14 | Las Vegas Raiders | West | 4 | 13 | 0 | .235 | 0–6 | 3–9 | .540 | .353 | L1 |
| 15 (Note: Cleveland finished ahead of Tennessee based on strength of victory. (Cleveland .510 to Tennessee .431)) | Cleveland Browns | North | 3 | 14 | 0 | .176 | 2–4 | 3–9 | .536 | .510 | L6 |
| 16 | Tennessee Titans | South | 3 | 14 | 0 | .176 | 1–5 | 3–9 | .522 | .431 | L6 |
**Tiebreakers** (Note: When breaking ties for three or more teams under the NFL's rules, they are first broken within divisions, then comparing only the highest ranked remaining team from each division.)

== Postseason ==
=== Schedule ===
| Round | Date | Opponent (seed) | Result | Record | Venue | Recap |
|---|---|---|---|---|---|---|
| Wild Card | January 11 | Los Angeles Chargers (5) | W 32–12 | 1–0 | NRG Stadium | Recap |
| Divisional | January 18 | at Kansas City Chiefs (1) | L 14–23 | 1–1 | Arrowhead Stadium | Recap |

=== Game summaries ===
==== AFC Wild Card Playoffs: vs. (5) Los Angeles Chargers ====
AFC Wild Card Playoffs: (5) Los Angeles Chargers at (4) Houston Texans – Game summary

| Quarter | 1 | 2 | 3 | 4 | Total |
|---|---|---|---|---|---|
| Chargers | 6 | 0 | 0 | 6 | 12 |
| Texans | 0 | 10 | 10 | 12 | 32 |

at NRG Stadium, Houston, Texas

- Date: January 11, 2025
- Game time: 3:30 p.m. CST
- Game weather: None (retractable roof closed)
- Game attendance: 71,408
- Referee: Land Clark
- TV announcers (CBS/Nickelodeon): Ian Eagle, Charles Davis and Evan Washburn (CBS)
  Nate Burleson (Nickelodeon)
- Recap, Game Book

Game information

First quarter

- LAC – Cameron Dicker 35-yard field goal, 9:37. Chargers 3–0. Drive: 10 plays, 57 yards, 5:23.
- LAC – Cameron Dicker 39-yard field goal, 6:35. Chargers 6–0. Drive: 6 plays, 12 yards, 2:53.

Second quarter

- HOU – Nico Collins 13-yard pass from C. J. Stroud (Ka'imi Fairbairn kick), 0:58. Texans 7–6. Drive: 13 plays, 99 yards, 5:17.
- HOU – Ka'imi Fairbairn 41-yard field goal, 0:03. Texans 10–6. Drive: 5 plays, 45 yards, 0:24.

Third quarter

- HOU – Ka'imi Fairbairn 37-yard field goal, 4:48. Texans 13–6. Drive: 10 plays, 46 yards, 5:22.
- HOU – Eric Murray 38-yard interception return (Ka'imi Fairbairn kick), 0:13. Texans 20–6.

Fourth quarter

- HOU – Ka'imi Fairbairn 30-yard field goal, 12:00. Texans 23–6. Drive: 4 plays, 1 yard, 1:44.
- LAC – Ladd McConkey 86-yard pass from Justin Herbert (kick blocked), 10:38. Texans 23–12. Drive: 3 plays, 70 yards, 1:22.
- HOU – Blocked kick returned by D'Angelo Ross, 10:38. Texans 25–12.
- HOU – Joe Mixon 17-yard run (Ka'imi Fairbairn kick), 3:42. Texans 32–12. Drive: 14 plays, 74 yards, 6:56.

Top passers

- LAC – Justin Herbert – 14/32, 242 yards, TD, 4 INT
- HOU – C. J. Stroud – 22/33, 282 yards, TD, INT

Top rushers

- LAC – J. K. Dobbins – 9 rushes, 26 yards
- HOU – Joe Mixon – 25 rushes, 106 yards, TD

Top receivers

- LAC – Ladd McConkey – 9 receptions, 197 yards, TD
- HOU – Nico Collins – 7 receptions, 122 yards, TD

This is the first time the Texans have played the Chargers in the playoffs, with the Texans being 3–6 against them all-time. The Texans had made their eight appearance in the wild-card round in their 23-year history, and they had played in the Saturday 4:30 slot each time (this streak would finally be broken the following year when the Texans played on Monday night). Los Angeles quarterback Justin Herbert, who only threw a total of three interceptions during the regular season, was picked off four times during the game.

==== AFC Divisional Playoffs: at (1) Kansas City Chiefs ====
Divisional Round: (4) Houston Texans at (1) Kansas City Chiefs – Game summary

| Quarter | 1 | 2 | 3 | 4 | Total |
|---|---|---|---|---|---|
| Texans | 3 | 3 | 6 | 2 | 14 |
| Chiefs | 6 | 7 | 0 | 10 | 23 |

at Arrowhead Stadium, Kansas City, Missouri

- Date: January 18, 2025
- Game time: 3:30 p.m. CST
- Game weather: 23 °F (−5 °C)
- Game attendance: 73,458
- Referee: Clay Martin
- TV announcers (ESPN/ABC/ESPN+): Joe Buck, Troy Aikman, Lisa Salters and Laura Rutledge
- Recap, Game Book

Game information

First quarter

- KC – Harrison Butker 32-yard field goal, 13:58. Chiefs 3–0. Drive: 4 plays, -1 yard, 1:02.
- HOU – Ka'imi Fairbairn 30-yard field goal, 8:41. Tied 3–3. Drive: 10 plays, 68 yards, 5:17.
- KC – Harrison Butker 36-yard field goal, 3:59. Chiefs 6–3. Drive: 9 plays, 51 yards, 4:42.

Second quarter

- KC – Kareem Hunt 1-yard run (Harrison Butker kick), 4:36. Chiefs 13–3. Drive: 5 plays, 55 yards, 2:25.
- HOU – Ka'imi Fairbairn 48-yard field goal, 0:16. Chiefs 13–6. Drive: 9 plays, 41 yards, 4:20.

Third quarter

- HOU – Joe Mixon 13-yard run (kick failed), 4:36. Chiefs 13–12. Drive: 15 plays, 82 yards, 10:24.

Fourth quarter

- KC – Travis Kelce 11-yard pass from Patrick Mahomes (Harrison Butker kick), 11:52. Chiefs 20–12. Drive: 13 plays, 81 yards, 7:44.
- KC – Harrison Butker 27-yard field goal, 4:38. Chiefs 23–12. Drive: 7 plays, 36 yards, 2:57.
- HOU – Matt Araiza ran out of end zone for safety, 0:09. Chiefs 23–14.

Top passers

- HOU – C. J. Stroud – 19/28, 245 yards
- KC – Patrick Mahomes – 16/25, 177 yards, TD

Top rushers

- HOU – Joe Mixon – 18 rushes, 88 yards, TD
- KC – Kareem Hunt – 8 rushes, 44 yards, TD

Top receivers

- HOU – Nico Collins – 5 receptions, 81 yards
- KC – Travis Kelce – 7 receptions, 117 yards, TD

This was the third postseason meeting between these two teams, and the second meeting in the Divisional Round. The Chiefs lead the all-time series 10–5, winning four-straight.

The Texans are winless in the Divisional Round, being 0–6, with all six losses being on the road. Their closest victory was a 20–13 loss to the Baltimore Ravens in the 2011 Divisional Round.

The last postseason meeting between these two teams was the 2019 Divisional Round, where the Texans had a 24–0 lead in the second quarter, but trailed 28–24 at halftime, and lost the game 51–31.

== Statistics ==
=== Team ===
| Category | Total yards | Yards per game | NFL rank (out of 32) |
|---|---|---|---|
| Passing offense | 3,526 | 207.4 | 21st |
| Rushing offense | 1,909 | 112.3 | 15th |
| Total offense | 5,435 | 319.7 | 22nd |
| Passing defense | 3,417 | 201.0 | 6th |
| Rushing defense | 1,938 | 114.0 | 11th |
| Total defense | 5,355 | 315.0 | 5th |

=== Individual ===
| Category | Player | Total |
Offense
| Passing yards | C. J. Stroud | 3,727 |
| Passing touchdowns | C. J. Stroud | 20 |
| Rushing yards | Joe Mixon | 1,016 |
| Rushing touchdowns | Joe Mixon | 11 |
| Receiving yards | Nico Collins | 1,006 |
| Receiving touchdowns | Nico Collins | 7 |
Defense
| Tackles (Solo) | Henry To'oTo'o | 54 |
| Sacks | Danielle Hunter | 12 |
| Interceptions | Calen Bullock; Derek Stingley Jr. | 5 |
