= Dare Ogunbowale =

American football player (born 1994)

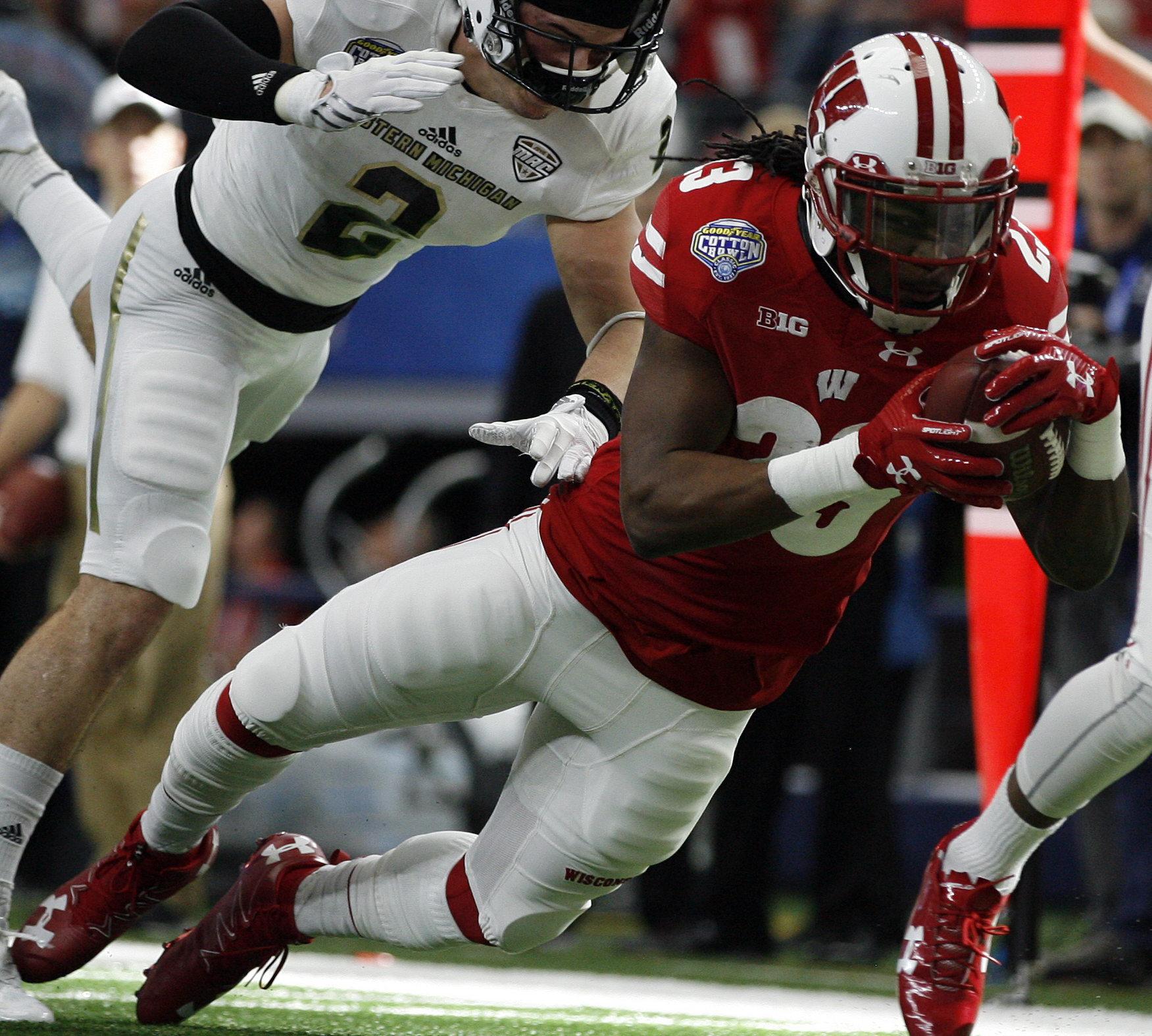
- Ogunbowale with the Wisconsin Badgers in 2017

No. 23 – Houston Texans
- Position: Running back
- Roster status: Practice squad

Personal information
- Born: May 4, 1994 (age 32); Milwaukee, Wisconsin, U.S.
- Listed height: 5 ft 11 in (1.80 m)
- Listed weight: 205 lb (93 kg)

Career information
- High school: Marquette (Milwaukee)
- College: Wisconsin (2012–2016)
- NFL draft: 2017: undrafted

Career history
- Houston Texans (2017)*; Tampa Bay Buccaneers (2017)*; Washington Commanders (2017); Tampa Bay Buccaneers (2018–2019); Jacksonville Jaguars (2020–2021); Houston Texans (2022–2025); Las Vegas Raiders (2026)*; Houston Texans (2026–present)
- * Offseason or practice squad member only

Career NFL statistics as of Week 9, 2026
- Rushing yards: 594
- Rushing average: 3.4
- Rushing touchdowns: 5
- Receptions: 110
- Receiving yards: 853
- Receiving touchdowns: 2
- Stats at Pro Football Reference

Oluwadare "Dare" Ogunbowale (darr-AY OH-goon-bo-wal-ay; born May 4, 1994) is an American professional football running back for the Houston Texans of the National Football League (NFL). He played college football for the Wisconsin Badgers, beginning his career as a walk-on. Ogunbowale signed with the Houston Texans as an undrafted free agent in 2017.

== College career ==
Ogunbowale walked onto the Wisconsin football team as a cornerback. He eventually switched to running back and racked up over 2,000 total yards and 15 total touchdowns. He was voted team captain his senior year. Following a game against Nebraska in 2014, Ogunbowale was featured in Sports Illustrated due to an error; the magazine editors mistook a photo of Ogunbowale for teammate Melvin Gordon.

=== College statistics ===
Season		GP	Rushing				Receiving			
Year	Team	GP	Att	Yds	Avg	TD	Rec	Yds	Avg	TD
2013	Wisconsin	2	0	0	0	0	0	0	0	0
2014	Wisconsin	11	34	193	5.7	1	0	0	0	0
2015	Wisconsin	13	194	819	4.2	7	36	299	8.3	1
2016	Wisconsin	14	91	506	5.6	5	24	208	8.7	1
Total			319	1,518	4.8	13	60	507	8.5	2

== Professional career ==
Pre-draft measurables
Height	Weight	Arm length	Hand span	Wingspan	40-yard dash	10-yard split	20-yard split	20-yard shuttle	Three-cone drill	Vertical jump	Broad jump	Bench press	Wonderlic
5 ft 10 3/4 in (1.80 m)	213 lb (97 kg)	31 3/8 in (0.80 m)	9 1/8 in (0.23 m)	6 ft 3 7/8 in (1.93 m)	4.62 s	1.60 s	2.60 s	4.21 s	6.99 s	35.0 in (0.89 m)	10 ft 0 in (3.05 m)	14 reps	36
All values from NFL Combine/Pro Day

=== Houston Texans (first stint) ===
Ogunbowale was signed by the Houston Texans as an undrafted free agent on May 16, 2017. He was waived on September 2, and was re-signed to the Texans' practice squad the next day. Ogunbowale was released on October 6.

=== Tampa Bay Buccaneers (first stint) ===
On November 29, 2017, Ogunbowale was signed to the Tampa Bay Buccaneers' practice squad. He was released by the Buccaneers on December 6.

=== Washington Redskins ===
On December 12, 2017, Ogunbowale was signed to the Washington Redskins' practice squad. He was promoted to the active roster on December 22, before being waived on March 6, 2018.

=== Tampa Bay Buccaneers (second stint) ===
On August 2, 2018, Ogunbowale signed with the Buccaneers. He was waived on September 1, and was re-signed to the practice squad. On October 17, Ogunbowale was released from the Buccaneers practice squad. He was re-signed on October 31. Ogunbowale was promoted to the active roster on November 13. He was waived on November 30, and re-signed to the practice squad. Ogunbowale signed a reserve/future contract with the Buccaneers on December 31.

In the 2019 season, Ogunbowale was voted to be a team captain and finished with 35 receptions for 286 receiving yards to go along with 11 carries for 17 rushing yards and two rushing touchdowns.

On September 5, 2020, Ogunbowale was waived by the Buccaneers.

=== Jacksonville Jaguars ===
On September 10, 2020, Ogunbowale signed with the Jacksonville Jaguars. He started the last two games of the 2020 season for the Jaguars. He finished the 2020 season with 32 carries for 145 rushing yards. He re-signed with the Jaguars as an exclusive-rights free agent on April 19, 2021.

In the 2021 season, Ogunbowale had 43 carries for 137 rushing yards and one rushing touchdown to go with 13 receptions for 114 receiving yards and one receiving touchdown.

=== Houston Texans (second stint) ===
On March 23, 2022, Ogunbowale signed a two-year $3.3 million deal with the Texans. On November 5, 2023, in a game against the Buccaneers, Ogunbowale was pressed into action as the Texans emergency placekicker after an injury to starting kicker Kaʻimi Fairbairn. In the fourth quarter, he became the first non-kicker to make a field goal in a regular season game since Wes Welker did so in 2004. The Texans went on to win 39–37. He finished the 2022 season with 42 carries for 123 rushing yards and one rushing touchdown to go with 20 receptions for 104 receiving yards.

In the 2023 season, Ogunbowale had mainly a special teams role.

On April 22, 2024, the Texans re-signed Ogunbowale. In Week 4, Ogunbowale scored the game-winning touchdown in a 24–20 win over the Jacksonville Jaguars. In the 2024 season, he had 30 carries for 112 rushing yards and 19 receptions for 198 receiving yards and one receiving touchdown.

On March 5, 2025, Ogunbowale re-signed with the Texans on a one-year, $2 million deal. He appeared in all 17 games in the season. A majority of his contributions came on special teams.

=== Las Vegas Raiders ===
On August 6, 2026, Ogunbowale signed with the Las Vegas Raiders. He was released by the Raiders as a part of final roster cuts on August 30. The following day, Ogunbowale was re–signed to Las Vegas' practice squad.

=== Houston Texans (third stint) ===
On September 29, 2026, Ogunbowale was signed by the Houston Texans off the Raiders practice squad. On November 13, he was released and re-signed to the practice squad.

== Personal life ==
Ogunbowale was born in the United States to a Black American mother and a father who immigrated from Nigeria. He attended Marquette University High School in Milwaukee, Wisconsin where he was a four sport athlete - football, soccer, basketball and track. Ogunbowale's younger sister Arike is a professional basketball player for the Dallas Wings of the WNBA.
