= Azeez Al-Shaair =

American football player (born 1997)

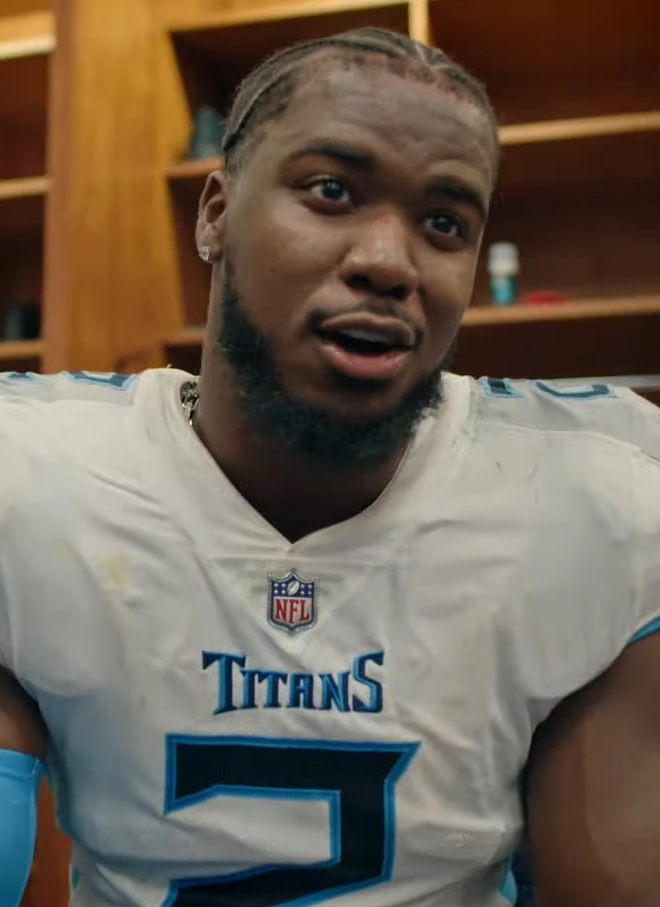
- Al-Shaair with the Tennessee Titans in 2023

No. 0 – Houston Texans
- Position: Linebacker
- Roster status: Injured reserve

Personal information
- Born: August 4, 1997 (age 29); Tampa, Florida, U.S.
- Listed height: 6 ft 2 in (1.88 m)
- Listed weight: 228 lb (103 kg)

Career information
- High school: Hillsborough (Tampa)
- College: Florida Atlantic (2015–2018)
- NFL draft: 2019: undrafted

Career history
- San Francisco 49ers (2019–2022); Tennessee Titans (2023); Houston Texans (2024–present)

Awards and highlights
- Pro Bowl (2025); First-team All C-USA (2017)

Career NFL statistics as of Week 9, 2026
- Total tackles: 603
- Sacks: 6.0
- Forced fumbles: 5
- Fumble recoveries: 5
- Interceptions: 4
- Pass deflections: 27
- Stats at Pro Football Reference

Azeez Al-Shaair (/ælˈʃaɪər/ al-SHIRE; Arabic: عزيز الشاعر; born August 4, 1997) is an American professional football linebacker for the Houston Texans of the National Football League (NFL). He played college football for the Florida Atlantic Owls, where he received First-team All C-USA in 2017.

Raised by parents who converted to Islam, his childhood was split between Saudi Arabia and Florida. Undrafted in the 2019 NFL draft, Al-Shaair signed with the San Francisco 49ers as an undrafted free agent. In 2024, the NFL suspended him for three games for a violent illegal hit on Jacksonville Jaguars quarterback Trevor Lawrence. Al-Shaair is an advocate for Palestinian rights and has twice received fines for wearing pro-Palestine messages and names of slain Palestinian girls on his eye black, in violation of NFL uniform and equipment rules.

== Early life ==
Al-Shaair was born to James Tokley Jr. and Naadhirah Lennon on August 4, 1997, in Tampa, Florida. His parents converted to Islam, and the family adopted the surname Al-Shaair, an Arabic name meaning "The Poet". During his early childhood, he frequently moved back and forth between Tampa and Jeddah, Saudi Arabia, where his father worked as an English instructor. He lived exclusively in Saudi Arabia from ages four to six, during which time he was fully immersed in a traditional Islamic society.

Following his parents' divorce when he was in the second grade, Al-Shaair, his mother, and his seven siblings returned from Saudi Arabia and settled back in Tampa in the United States. They lived in Section 8 housing. During his sophomore year of high school in 2012, an accidental kitchen fire destroyed the home of Al-Shaair and his family, so the family had to immediately check into an extended-stay motel. He commuted two hours by bus from his motel to Hillsborough High School, where he played football. As a senior, he made 126 tackles with 6.5 sacks, two interceptions, three forced fumbles and three fumble recoveries and also blocked six field goals and a punt and was named first-team All-County. Al-Shaair committed to play college football at Florida Atlantic University going into his senior year, but continued to go on recruiting visits in order to help feed his family.

== College career ==
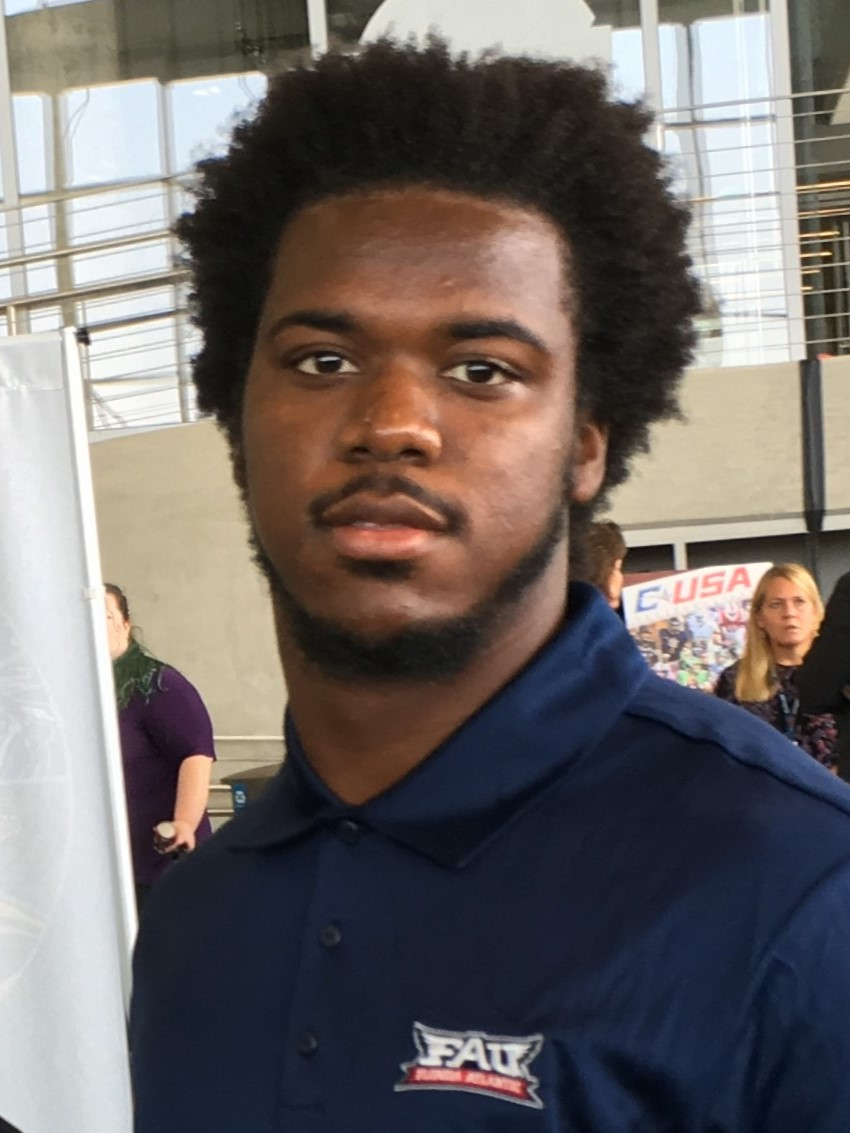
Al-Shaair before the 2018 FAU season.

Al-Shaair was a four-year starter at linebacker for the Florida Atlantic Owls. As a freshman, he was named to the Conference USA All-Freshman team and a Freshman All-American after recording a team-leading 94 tackles (7.5 for loss), 1.5 sacks, two passes broken up and a forced fumble. He again led the Owls in tackles as a sophomore with 113 tackles (12 for loss), returned an interception for a touchdown and was named as an honorable mention All-Conference USA. As a junior, he led Conference USA with 147 tackles (11 for loss) , 2.5 sacks, four passes defensed, and a forced fumble and was named first-team all conference. He entered his senior year on the Butkus Award watchlist.

However, he tore his ACL during a non-contact practice drill in October 2018, ending his final season with just six games, and ending his college career. His injury included complex structural joint damage to his left knee, in which Al-Shaair had completely torn his anterior cruciate ligament, heavily damaged his medial collateral ligament, and torn his meniscus.

== Professional career ==
Pre-draft measurables
Height	Weight	Arm length	Hand span	Wingspan	Bench press
6 ft 0 5/8 in (1.84 m)	234 lb (106 kg)	32 3/8 in (0.82 m)	9 1/2 in (0.24 m)	6 ft 6 1/8 in (1.98 m)	16 reps
All values from NFL Combine

=== San Francisco 49ers ===
==== 2019-21 ====
Al-Shaair was signed by the San Francisco 49ers as an undrafted free agent on April 27, 2019. He made his NFL debut in the season-opener against the Tampa Bay Buccaneers, playing exclusively on special teams and making two tackles in the 31-17 road victory. He played in 15 games with four starts as a rookie, making 18 tackles. Al-Shaair did not appear in any postseason games, while the 49ers played and lost in Super Bowl LIV to the Kansas City Chiefs by a score of 31–20.

In Week 4 in 2020 against the Philadelphia Eagles on Sunday Night Football, Al-Shaair recorded his first career interception off a pass thrown by Carson Wentz during the 25–20 loss.

During the 2020 season, Al-Shaair was fined once by the NFL for his illegal use of his helmet. On appeal his fine was reduced from $4,000 to $3,200. In another game, he was again disciplined for his illegal use of his helmet, but was not fined.

Al-Shaair entered the 2021 season as a starting linebacker for the 49ers. He started 13 games, finishing second on the team with 102 tackles, along with two sacks, five passes defensed, an interception, a forced fumble and two fumble recoveries.

During the 2021 season, Al-Shaair was fined $41,200 by the NFL in one instance for his illegal use of his helmet. Three additional times during the season he was disciplined for his illegal use of his helmet, without the league imposing a fine.

==== 2022 ====
On March 15, 2022, the 49ers placed a second-round restricted free agent tender on Al-Shaair. He was placed on injured reserve with an MCL tear in his right knee on October 3. He missed five games, and was activated on November 12.

During a game against the Tampa Bay Buccaneers on December 11, 2022, Al-Shaair drew media scrutiny and criticism for grabbing quarterback Tom Brady by the throat after Brady had passed the ball, and then not letting go immediately even though Brady had already thrown the ball. Despite Brady protesting to the officiating crew, no penalty flag was thrown on the play.

During the 2022 NFL season Al-Shaair was fined $11,139 by the league for fighting. Pursuant to an appeal, his penalty for fighting was reduced to $8,911.

=== Tennessee Titans ===
On March 20, 2023, Al-Shaair signed a one-year, $5 million contract with the Tennessee Titans. He started all 17 games and finished fifth in the league with 163 tackles.

While playing for the Titans, Al-Shaair was fined for his on-field behavior. The NFL fined him $13,934 for a hard late blow to the head and neck of a quarterback after he threw a pass. He was also was fined $10,927 for unnecessary roughness stemming from a face mask foul.

=== Houston Texans ===
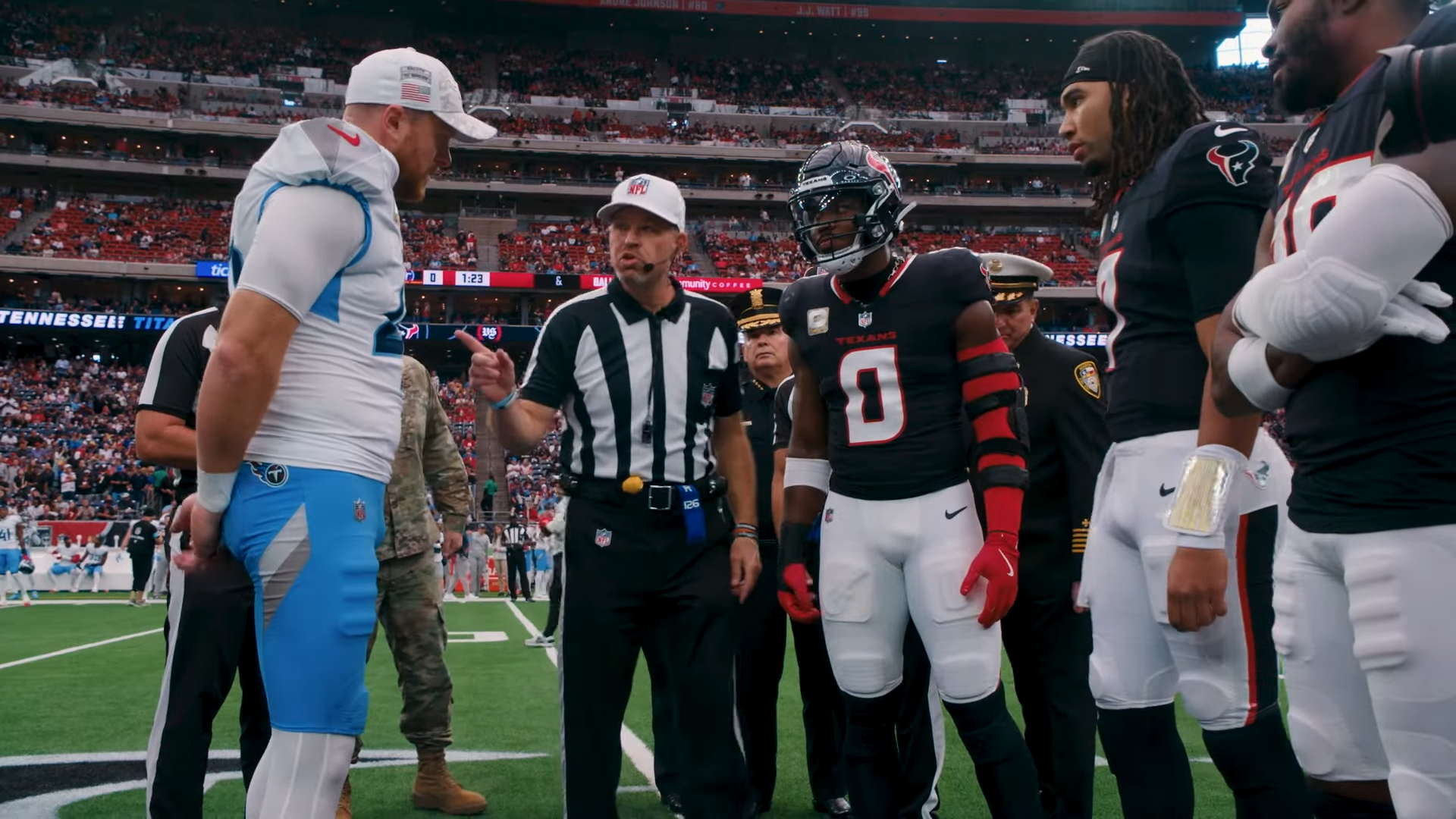
Al-Shaair (#0) with the Houston Texans in 2024.

On March 15, 2024, Al-Shaair signed a three-year, $34 million contract with the Houston Texans.

In Week 3, Al-Shaair punched Chicago Bears running back Roschon Johnson in his facemask on September 15, 2024, for which he was fined $11,000 by the league. At the time the officials missed Al-Shaair's punch, so he wasn’t ejected during the game. Johnson didn’t retaliate after Al-Shaair punched him, and wrote on social media: "It took every bit of my soul not to thrash that boy."

Al-Shaair was flagged and issued a second fine of $11,255 for delivering a late hit out of bounds on Tennessee Titans running back Tony Pollard on November 24, 2024, in Week 12.

One week later, on December 1, 2024, Al-Shaair delivered an illegal hit, a violent blow to Jacksonville Jaguars quarterback Trevor Lawrence, as Al-Shaair raised his forearm, dove, and hit the quarterback in his head after Lawrence had slid. Lawrence's body reacted in a manner consistent with one who has received a traumatic brain injury, and he remained on motionless on the ground for several minutes. He was carted off the field, and ruled out for the rest of the game with a concussion. Al-Shaair was ejected for "an illegal hit on the quarterback, unnecessary, to the neck and head area." A fight erupted between Al-Shaair and several Jaguar players, with Jacksonville cornerback Jarrian Jones also getting ejected, in which he escalated when he pulled an opponent down to the ground by his facemask, and then after he was ejected reengaging with his opponent and starting another physical confrontation. Al-Shaair apologized via social media for the hit the next day. Jaguars coach Doug Pederson said it was a play that "really has no business being in our league," and Houston coach DeMeco Ryans said "that's not what we're coaching."

Two days after the game, the NFL suspended Al-Shaair without pay for three games, his third penalty of the season, and costing him three game checks totaling $338,235. Jon Runyan, the NFL's Vice President of the Policy and Rules, wrote in the suspension letter in which he criticized Al-Shaair for the illegal tackle followed by engaging in a brawl. Runyan concluded in the letter that Al-Shaair's "lack of sportsmanship and respect for the game of football … is troubling and does not reflect the core values of the NFL" and that his ”continued disregard for NFL playing rules … will not be tolerated."

In 2025, Al-Shaair led the Texans in tackles while anchoring one of the NFL’s top ranked defense, and received his first career selection to the Pro Bowl squad.

On April 29, 2026, the Texans signed Al-Shaair to a three-year, $54 million contract extension through the 2029 season.

== NFL career statistics ==
Legend
**Bold**	Career high

=== Regular season ===
Year	Team	Games		Tackles					Fumbles				Interceptions					
Year	Team	GP	GS	Cmb	Solo	Ast	Sck	TFL	FF	FR	Yds	TD	Int	Yds	Avg	Lng	TD	PD
2019	SF	15	4	18	11	7	0.0	0	0	0	0	0	0	0	0.0	0	0	0
2020	SF	16	5	35	22	18	0.0	1	1	0	0	0	1	0	0.0	0	0	2
2021	SF	13	13	102	58	44	**2.0**	**9**	1	**2**	**12**	0	1	**24**	**24.0**	**24**	0	**5**
2022	SF	12	9	44	20	24	0.0	1	0	1	5	0	0	0	0.0	0	0	0
2023	TEN	**17**	**17**	**163**	**84**	**79**	**2.0**	**9**	0	1	0	0	0	0	0.0	0	0	4
2024	HOU	11	11	70	45	25	2.0	7	**2**	0	0	0	0	0	0.0	0	0	4
2025	HOU	16	16	103	48	55	0.0	1	1	1	0	0	**2**	0	0.0	0	0	9
2026	HOU	7	7	68	26	42	0.0	1	0	0	0	0	0	0	0.0	0	0	3
Career		107	82	603	314	289	6.0	29	5	5	17	0	4	24	6.0	24	0	27

=== Postseason ===
Year	Team	Games		Tackles					Fumbles				Interceptions					
Year	Team	GP	GS	Cmb	Solo	Ast	Sck	TFL	FF	FR	Yds	TD	Int	Yds	Avg	Lng	TD	PD
2021	SF	**3**	1	13	**7**	6	0.0	0	0	0	0	0	0	0	0.0	0	0	0
2022	SF	**3**	**3**	12	6	6	0.0	0	0	0	0	0	0	0	0.0	0	0	0
2024	HOU	2	2	12	5	7	0.0	0	0	0	0	0	0	0	0.0	0	0	0
2025	HOU	2	2	**15**	**7**	**8**	0.0	**1**	0	**2**	**2**	0	0	0	0.0	0	0	0
Career		10	8	52	25	27	0.0	1	0	2	2	0	0	0	0.0	0	0	0

== Personal life and advocacy ==
Al-Shaair is a practicing Muslim and fasts during Ramadan, including when he was participating in FAU's summer practices. He began dating dental professional Yahaira Onofre, from Atlanta, in 2015, marrying her in 2022 after a four-year engagement. By late 2024, the couple had split and Al-Shaair was dating Kaya Coverson.

Al-Shaair has been involved in community outreach, with organizations such as United Way. His service efforts have additionally included youth development initiatives, recognition of local firefighters, and humanitarian awareness related to Palestine. In recognition of his off-the-field leadership and impact, Al-Shaair was named the Texans' nominee for the NFL's Walter Payton Man of the Year Award for 2025.

Al-Shaair is an advocate for Palestinian rights and was seen wearing cleats with pro-Palestine messages as early as 2024. He wore an eye black with the message "stop the genocide" during a post-game interview with ESPN on January 12, 2026 after the Texans' playoff win over the Pittsburgh Steelers. Al-Shaair was fined $11,593 by the NFL for violation of the NFL uniform and equipment rules. He wore a similar eye black during the January 18 game against the New England Patriots.

On September 16, 2026, Al-Shaair was fined $11,593 by the NFL for wearing an eye black with the name of Hind Rajab, a 5-year-old girl who was killed by the IDF in Gaza. Similarly, a few days later, ahead of a game against the Cincinnati Bengals, Al-Shaair wore an eye black bearing the name of Wafaa Akila, an 8-year-old Palestinian girl killed in an Israeli strike on September 6; while he was not fined on this occasion, he was reportedly forced the remove to patch with the warning that he would not be allowed to continue playing in that game. On September 27, Al-Shaair bore the names of slain Gaza sisters Lana Ahmed, 12, and Bana Ahmed, 8, on his eye black ahead of a game against the Indianapolis Colts; he did the same with the name of Amal Abu Khater, shot dead by Israel on August 25, during a match against the Tennessee Titans on October 11. The following week, he paid tribute to 3-year-old Maryam Ghanem, who had recently been rescued from an Israeli attack on her house in which her mother was burned to death; this marked Al-Shaair's fifth consecutive week honoring Palestinian children on his eye black. The next week, he paid homage to Fatima al-Bayouk, the sole survivor of her family slain in December 2023, who had recently been shot to death by Israel in Gaza, and another two weeks later to Salem Al-Najjar, a boy who died from his illness a few hours after his overdue evacuation from Gaza.
