= Kaʻimi Fairbairn =

American football player (born 1994)

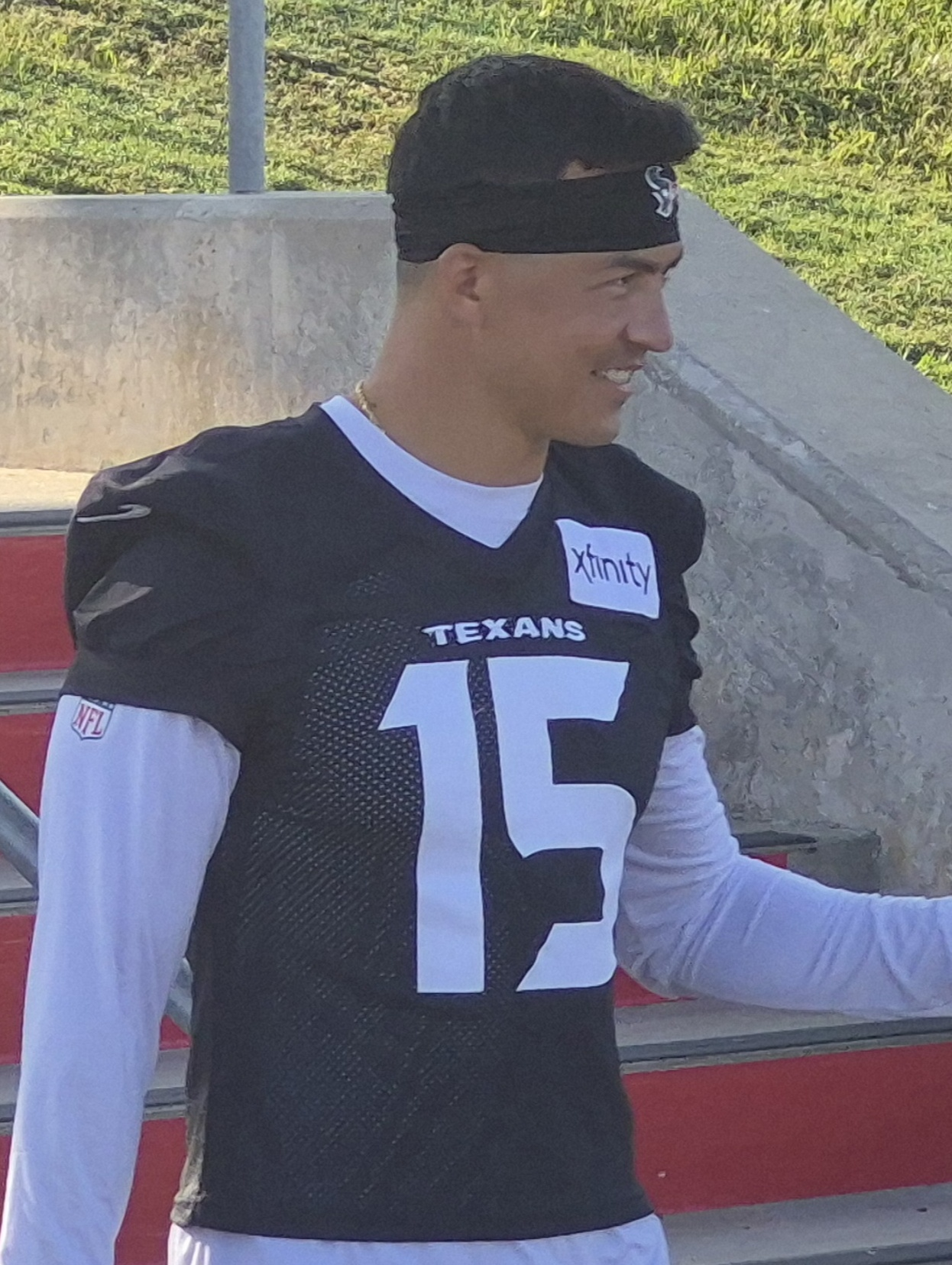
- Fairbairn in 2026

No. 15 – Houston Texans
- Position: Placekicker
- Roster status: Active

Personal information
- Born: January 29, 1994 (age 32); Kailua, Hawaii, U.S.
- Listed height: 6 ft 0 in (1.83 m)
- Listed weight: 183 lb (83 kg)

Career information
- High school: Punahou (Honolulu, Hawaii)
- College: UCLA (2012–2015)
- NFL draft: 2016: undrafted

Career history
- Houston Texans (2016–present)

Awards and highlights
- NFL scoring leader (2018); Lou Groza Award (2015); Consensus All-American (2015); Second-team All-Pac-12 (2015); NFL records: Most field goals made in a season (tied): 44 (2025)

Career NFL statistics as of Week 11, 2026
- Field goals made: 275
- Field goals attempted: 312
- Field goal %: 88.1%
- Extra points made: 295
- Extra points attempted: 314
- Extra point %: 93.9%
- Points: 1,120
- Longest field goal: 61
- Touchbacks: 361
- Stats at Pro Football Reference

John Christian Kaʻiminoeauloamekaʻikeokekumupaʻa Fairbairn (born January 29, 1994) is an American professional football placekicker for the Houston Texans of the National Football League (NFL). Playing college football for the UCLA Bruins, he was a consensus first-team All-American as a senior, when he was also awarded the Lou Groza Award as the nation's top college kicker in 2015. After winning the kicking position as a true freshman, Fairbairn became the Pac-12 Conference record holder for the most career points scored. He signed with the Texans as an undrafted free agent in 2016 and was named their starting kicker the following year.

With a career field goal percentage of 88.1%, Fairbairn is currently the fourth most accurate kicker in NFL history. (Note: Minimum 100 career field goal attempts. The only players ahead of Fairbairn are Cameron Dicker (93%), Justin Tucker (89.1%), and Eddy Piñeiro (88.6%).)

== Early life ==
Fairbairn was born in Kailua, Hawaii, to John and Rochelle Fairbairn. Since childhood, he has gone by the name Kaʻimi, forgoing John Christian. In Hawaiian, Fairbairn's name means 'seeker of wisdom'. He stated: "The meaning of your name is your life. Hawaiians have a long ancestry. It's really meaningful for me to go by my Hawaiian name."

As a young man, Fairbairn was a kicker in football but preferred catching the football instead. He attended high school at Punahou School, where Fairbairn was a two-sport star in football and soccer. Playing central defender in soccer, he was a two-time first-team all-state player, and the team won two state championships.

Fairbairn did not initially play football at Punahou. He did not envision a future in the sport, and tried out for water polo instead. After almost drowning, Fairbairn realized he was not a proficient swimmer and returned to football. As a sophomore, Fairbairn was named second-team all-state, and he earned first-team all-state as a junior and senior. Fairbairn was teammates with DeForest Buckner and was ranked nationally as the No. 4 recruit at kicker coming out of high school.

== College career ==
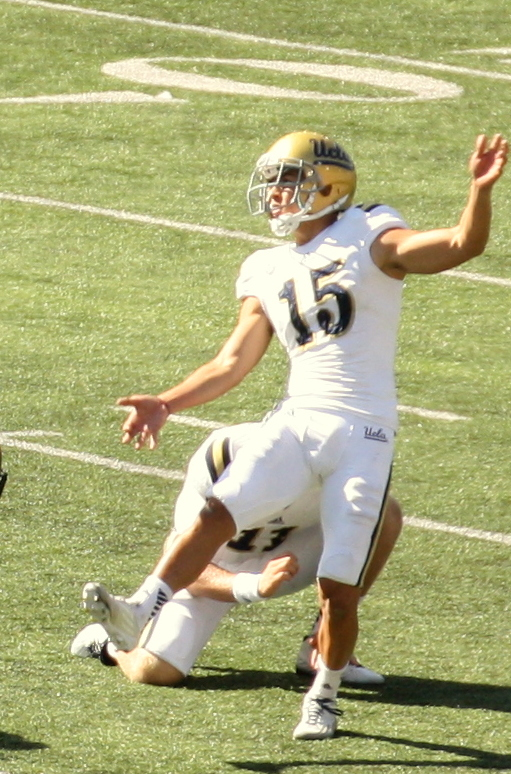
Fairbairn with the UCLA Bruins, 2014

Fairbairn won the kicking job at UCLA as a true freshman in 2012, and he became the first Bruin to score at least 100 points in each of his four seasons. Fairbairn's career got off to an inauspicious start when his first two extra points were blocked against Rice. Fairbairn became a dependable kicker from close range, but struggled from distance. In the Pac-12 Conference Championship Game that year, he missed a 52-yard field goal with 30 seconds remaining in a 27–24 loss to Stanford. With a wet field and a poor snap by Kevin McDermott, UCLA coach Jim Mora said: "We put [Fairbairn] in a tough situation there." In his junior year in 2014, UCLA was trailing Utah 30–28 when Fairbairn missed a 55-yard attempt as time expired. However, the Utes were penalized for running into the kicker, providing him a chance at a 50-yard field goal, which missed just wide right.

Entering the 2015 season, the senior Fairbairn was 11 for 22 on field-goal tries of 40 yards or more. On October 3 against Arizona State, he made a 53-yard field goal, the first successful 50-plus yarder of his career after missing his first five. The kick cut the Sun Devils' lead to 15–10 at the half, but the Bruins lost the game 38–23. In a 40–24 victory over California on October 22, Fairbairn had a 55-yarder called off because UCLA was penalized for a false start. With seconds left in the first half, Mora was initially going to have the offense try a Hail Mary pass. However, Fairbairn was given another opportunity, which he converted for a UCLA record 60-yard field goal. It was the first 60-yard field goal in the Football Bowl Subdivision since 2012. On November 14, Fairbairn made four field goals against Washington State to set the Pac-12 record for most career points, breaking former Bruins kicker John Lee's previous mark of 390 (1982–1985).

Fairbairn finished the regular season having made 20 of 23 field goal attempts, including a perfect 16 of 16 from inside 40 yards and four from beyond 40. He was awarded the Lou Groza Award, given annually to the nation's top college kicker. Fairbairn was a near unanimous first-team All-American, earning first-team honors from all the official selectors except Sporting News, who named him to their second-team. However, he was only named second-team All-Pac-12. In the Foster Farms Bowl, Fairbairn missed a 46-yard field goal in a 37–29 loss to Nebraska. His career ended with three consecutive misses, including previous failed attempts of 49 yards at Utah and 47 at USC.

== Professional career ==
Pre-draft measurables
Height	Weight	Arm length	Hand span	Wingspan	Three-cone drill
5 ft 11 1/2 in (1.82 m)	183 lb (83 kg)	31 1/4 in (0.79 m)	9 1/4 in (0.23 m)	6 ft 2 1/2 in (1.89 m)	7.75 s
All values from NFL Combine/Pro Day

After not being selected in the 2016 NFL draft, Fairbairn signed with the Houston Texans.

=== 2016 season ===
Fairbairn spent all of the 2016 season on injured reserve with an injured quadriceps. As a result the Texans signed former San Diego Chargers kicker Nick Novak, who played the entire season with the team.

=== 2017 season ===
In 2017, Fairbairn was named the Texans' starting kicker over Novak. Fairbairn had attempted all of the team's field goals during the preseason, and he had a stronger leg and deeper kickoffs than the incumbent. During a Week 4 57–14 victory over the Tennessee Titans, Fairbairn converted six-of-seven extra points and all three field goal attempts. As a rookie, he converted 32 of 35 extra point attempts and 20 of 25 field goal attempts.

=== 2018 season ===
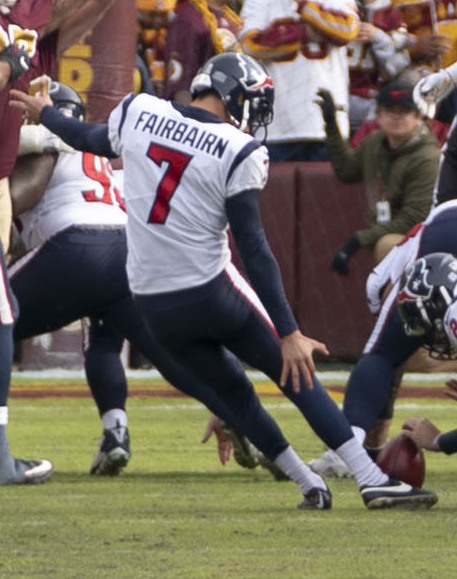
Fairbairn kicking a field goal against the Washington Redskins, 2018

During Week 15 of the 2018 season, Fairbairn kicked five field goals and two extra points during a 29–22 road victory over the New York Jets, earning him American Football Conference (AFC) Special Teams Player of the Week. He earned AFC Special Teams Player of the Month for December. On the season, Fairbairn did not miss a kick inside of 40 yards and led the league in points scored (150), field goals made (37)—which was also a franchise record—and field goals attempted (42). The Texans won the AFC South with a 11–5 record. During the Wild Card Round against the Indianapolis Colts, he converted an extra point in his playoff debut, a 21–7 loss.

=== 2019 season ===
On March 11, 2019, the Texans placed a second-round restricted free agent tender on Fairbairn. He began the 2019 season slowly while adjusting to a new holder, punter Bryan Anger, who replaced Trevor Daniel. Fairbairn made his last seven field goals to finish the season connecting on 20 of 25 field goals and 40 of 45 extra points. In the Wild Card Round, Fairbairn made a game-winning 28-yard field goal in overtime for a 22–19 comeback victory over the Buffalo Bills.

=== 2020 season ===
On March 10, 2020, Fairbairn was signed to a four-year, $17.65 million contract with the Texans. He converted 37 of 40 extra point attempts and 27 of 31 field goal attempts on the 2020 season.

=== 2021 season ===
On September 8, 2021, Fairbairn was placed on injured reserve. He was activated on October 2. On December 12, Fairbairn made a career-long 61-yard field goal during a 33–13 loss to the Seattle Seahawks, which also set a Texans' franchise record for longest field goal. In the 2021 season, he appeared in 13 games and converted 13 of 16 extra point attempts and 15 of 19 field goal attempts.

=== 2022 season ===
In the 2022 season, Fairbairn converted all 24 extra point attempts and 29 of 31 field goal attempts.

=== 2023 season ===
During Week 9 of the 2023 season, Fairbairn suffered a quad injury and was placed on injured reserve on November 11, 2023. He was activated on December 16. During Week 15 against the Titans, Fairbairn converted all five of his kicks for a total of 13 points, including a 54-yard game-winner in overtime to give the Texans a 19–16 road victory, earning AFC Special Teams Player of the Week honors. In the 2023 season, he converted 21 of 22 extra point attempts and 27 of 28 field goal attempts in 12 games.

In the playoffs, Fairbairn missed a field goal before halftime in the Divisional Round against the Baltimore Ravens which would have given the Texans a 13–10 lead. The Texans lost the game 34–10.

=== 2024 season ===
On March 6, 2024, Fairbairn signed a three-year, $15.9 million contract extension with the Texans through 2026. During a Week 2 19–13 victory over the Chicago Bears, Fairbairn converted four field goals, including three of 50-plus yards, earning AFC Special Teams Player of the Week. Three weeks later, Fairbairn converted a 59-yard field goal against the Bills with 0:00 remaining in the fourth quarter to deliver the Texans a win. He converted 34 of 36 extra point attempts and 36 of 42 field goal attempts in the 2024 season.

Despite Fairbairn having a good field goal percentage, he missed two field goals inside 30 yards, against the New York Jets and the Tennessee Titans. Both misses proved to be costly, as the Texans lost both of those games by one score.

Fairbairn's struggles continued in the playoffs, as he missed two field goals and an extra point in a 23–14 loss against the Kansas City Chiefs in the Divisional Round.

=== 2025 season ===
In the 2025 season, Fairbairn had his best season to date, tying David Akers for the NFL record for fields goals converted in a season in spite of missing two games. He converted all 28 of his extra point attempts and 44 of 48 field goal attempts in the 2025 season, setting a career high in points scored (160).

=== 2026 season ===
On March 10, 2026, Fairbairn signed a two-year, $13 million contract extension with the Texans, making him the highest-paid kicker in the league. Fairbairn was named AFC Special Teams Player of the Month for October after converting all 21 of his kicks, scoring 43 points and going perfect for the month.

== NFL career statistics ==
Legend
	NFL record
	Led the league
**Bold**	Career high

=== Regular season ===
Year	Team	GP	Field Goals									Extra Points			Points
Year	Team	GP	FGM	FGA	FG%	<20	20−29	30−39	40−49	50+	Lng	XPM	XPA	XP%	Points
2016	HOU	0	Did not play due to injury												
2017	HOU	16	20	25	80.0	0–0	3–4	8–10	6–7	3–4	55	32	35	91.4	92
2018	HOU	16	37	42	88.1	**1–1**	9–9	**11–11**	12–15	4–6	54	39	41	95.1	150
2019	HOU	16	20	25	80.0	0–0	5–5	8–8	4–6	3–6	54	**40**	**45**	88.9	100
2020	HOU	16	27	31	87.1	0–0	8–8	9–9	6–8	4–6	54	37	40	92.5	118
2021	HOU	13	15	19	78.9	0–0	4–4	5–5	2–4	4–6	**61**	13	16	81.3	58
2022	HOU	**17**	29	31	93.5	0–0	7–7	7–8	9-10	6-6	56	24	24	**100.0**	111
2023	HOU	12	27	28	**96.4**	0–0	**10–10**	10–10	2–2	5–6	54	21	22	95.5	102
2024	HOU	**17**	36	42	85.7	0–0	8–10	**11–11**	4–5	13–16	59	34	36	94.4	142
2025	HOU	15	44	48	91.7	0–0	8-8	**11–11**	**16–16**	**9–13**	57	28	28	**100.0**	**160**
2026	HOU	10	20	21	95.2	0–0	4–4	4–4	5–5	7–8	58	27	27	100.0	87
Total		148	275	312	88.1	1–1	66–69	84–87	66–78	58–77	61	295	314	93.9	1,120

=== Postseason ===
Year	Team	GP	Field Goals									Extra Points			Points
Year	Team	GP	FGM	FGA	FG%	<20	20−29	30−39	40−49	50+	Lng	XPM	XPA	XP%	Points
2016	HOU	0	Did not play due to injury												
2018	HOU	1	0	0	0.0	0−0	0−0	0−0	0−0	0−0	0	1	1	**100.0**	1
2019	HOU	**2**	3	4	75.0	0−0	**1−1**	**1−1**	**1−1**	0−1	41	4	4	**100.0**	13
2023	HOU	**2**	2	3	66.7	0−0	**1−1**	0−0	0−1	**1−1**	50	**7**	**7**	**100.0**	13
2024	HOU	**2**	**5**	**7**	71.4	0−0	0−0	3−4	**2−2**	0−1	39	3	4	75.0	**18**
2025	HOU	**2**	4	4	**100.0**	0−0	**2−2**	0−0	0−0	**2−2**	**51**	4	5	80.0	16
Total		9	14	18	77.8	0−0	4−4	4−5	3−4	3−5	51	19	21	90.5	61
