= Jalen Pitre =

American football player (born 1999)

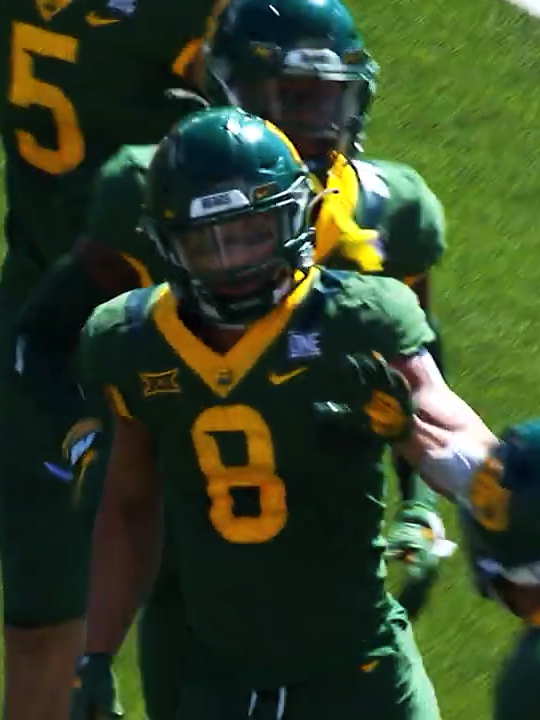
- Pitre with Baylor in 2021

No. 5 – Houston Texans
- Position: Safety
- Roster status: Active

Personal information
- Born: June 3, 1999 (age 27); Stafford, Texas, U.S.
- Listed height: 6 ft 0 in (1.83 m)
- Listed weight: 200 lb (91 kg)

Career information
- High school: Stafford
- College: Baylor (2017–2021)
- NFL draft: 2022: 2nd round, 37th overall pick

Career history
- Houston Texans (2022–present)

Awards and highlights
- PFWA All-Rookie Team (2022); Consensus All-American (2021); Big 12 Defensive Player of the Year (2021); 2× First-team All-Big 12 (2020, 2021)

Career NFL statistics as of Week 7, 2026
- Total tackles: 394
- Sacks: 1
- Forced fumbles: 2
- Fumble recoveries: 3
- Pass deflections: 38
- Interceptions: 10
- Stats at Pro Football Reference

Jalen Pitre (/ˈpiːtri/ PEE-tree; born June 3, 1999) is an American professional football safety for the Houston Texans of the National Football League (NFL). He played college football for the Baylor Bears and in 2021, he was named the Big 12 Defensive Player of the Year and a consensus All-American.

== Early life ==
Pitre attended Stafford High School in Stafford, Texas. He committed to Baylor University to play college football.

== College career ==
As a true freshman at Baylor in 2017, Pitre started eight of 12 games, recording 37 tackles and one sack. As a sophomore he started one of 13 games and had 11 tackles. In 2019, he played in four games and took a redshirt. He finished the season with 12 tackles. As a redshirt junior in 2020, Pitre started all nine games, recording 60 tackles, two interceptions and two sacks. He returned as a starter in 2021 and was named a finalist for the Jim Thorpe Award. He was named Big 12 Defensive Player of the Year and earned Consensus All-American honors.

== Professional career ==
=== Pre-draft ===
NFL draft analyst Dane Brugler of the Athletic ranked Pitre third amongst all safeties in the draft. NFL.com media analyst Daniel Jeremiah ranked him as the third best safety (40th overall) in the draft. Kevin Hanson of Sports Illustrated ranked Pitre as the fourth best safety prospect in the draft. Scouts Inc. listed him fourth among all safeties (49th overall) on their big board.Bleacher Report and Zach Patraw of Sports Illustrated had Pitre ranked fifth among all safety prospects. ESPN draft analyst Mel Kiper Jr. had Pitre ranked as the fifth best safety prospect available in the draft. Pro Football Focus had him ranked sixth amongst all safeties available in the draft. NFL analyst Lance Zierlein projected Pitre would be selected in the third round. The majority of NFL draft analysts projected Pitre to be a second or third round pick in the 2022 NFL Draft.

External videos
- Jalen Pitre: College Highlights

Pre-draft measurables
Height	Weight	Arm length	Hand span	Wingspan	40-yard dash	10-yard split	20-yard split	20-yard shuttle	Three-cone drill	Vertical jump	Broad jump	Bench press
5 ft 11 in (1.80 m)	198 lb (90 kg)	30 5/8 in (0.78 m)	9 in (0.23 m)	6 ft 1 1/2 in (1.87 m)	4.46 s	1.53 s	2.57 s	4.15 s	6.74 s	35.0 in (0.89 m)	9 ft 11 in (3.02 m)	16 reps
All values from NFL Combine/Pro Day

=== 2022 ===
The Houston Texans selected Pitre in the second round (37th overall) of the 2022 NFL draft. He was the fourth safety drafted in 2022.

External videos
- Texans select Jalen Pitre No. 37
- Jalen Pitre's Post-draft press conference

On May 11, 2022, the Houston Texans signed Pitre to a four–year, $8.95 million rookie contract that includes $6.23 million guaranteed upon signing and an initial signing bonus of $3.69 million.

He entered training camp projected to become the starting free safety following the departure of Justin Reid. He competed for a starting role against Eric Murray, Jonathan Owens, and M. J. Stewart. Head coach Lovie Smith named him the starting free safety to begin the season and paired him with strong safety Jonathan Owens.

On September 11, 2022, Pitre made his professional regular season debut and earned his first career start in the Houston Texans' home-opener against the Indianapolis Colts and made ten combined tackles (five solo) during a 20–20 tie in overtime. On September 25, 2022, Pitre made eight combined tackles (five solo), two pass deflections, a fumble recovery, a sack, and a career-high two interceptions as the Texans lost 23–20 at the Chicago Bears. He had his first career sack on quarterback Justin Fields for an eight–yard loss and made his first career interception on a pass by Fields to tight end Cole Kmet. In Week 13, he collected a career-high 16 combined tackles (nine solo), made a pass deflection, and intercepted a pass by Deshaun Watson to wide receiver Amari Cooper during a 14–27 loss to the Cleveland Browns. In Week 17, Pitre racked up a season-high 11 solo tackles (13 combined), broke up a pass, and set a career-high with his fifth interception of the season on a pass attempt by C. J. Beathard to wide receiver Marvin Jones during a 3–31 loss against the Jacksonville Jaguars. He started in all 17 games as a rookie and recorded a total of 147 combined tackles (99 solo), one sack, five interceptions, and eight passes defended. He was named to the PFWA All-Rookie Team. He received an overall grade of 54.7 from Pro Football Focus as a rookie in 2022.

=== 2023 ===
On January 8, 2023, the Houston Texans fired head coach Lovie Smith after they finished the 2022 NFL season with a 3–13–1 record. On January 31, 2023, the Texans hired San Francisco 49ers' defensive coordinator DeMeco Ryans as their new head coach. Pitre entered training camp slated as the de facto starting strong safety under defensive coordinator Matt Burke. Head coach DeMeco Ryans named Pitre and Eric Murray as the starting safeties to begin the season.

He was inactive for two games (Weeks 2–3) after injuring his chest. On October 8, 2023, Pitre collected a season-high 13 combined tackles (nine solo) and made a pass deflection during a 19–23 loss at the Atlanta Falcons. In Week 15, he made four combined tackles (one solo) and a season-high two pass deflections during a 19–16 overtime victory at the Tennessee Titans. He finished the 2023 NFL season with 84 combined tackles (58 solo), five passes defended, one forced fumble, and one fumble recovery in 15 games and 15 starts. Pro Football Focus had Pitre finish the season with an overall grade of 61.8.

The Houston Texans finished the 2023 NFL season first in the AFC South with a 10–7 record, clinching a playoff berth. On January 13, 2024, Pitre started in his first career playoff appearance and recorded three combined tackles (two solo) during a 45–14 win against the Cleveland Browns in the AFC Wild-Card Game. The following week, he had six combined tackles (four solo) and a pass deflection as the Texans were defeated 10–34 at the Baltimore Ravens in the Divisional Round.

=== 2024 ===
He retained his role as the Houston Texans' starting strong safety, alongside Eric Murray, to begin the 2024 NFL season. In Week 2, Pitre racked up a season-high ten combined tackles (eight solo) during a 19–13 win against the Chicago Bears. On October 27, 2024, Pitre made four combined tackles (three solo), a pass deflection, and had his first and only interception of the season on a pass by Anthony Richardson to wide receiver Josh Downs during a 23–20 victory against the Indianapolis Colts. In Week 12, Pitre made one solo tackle before exiting during the second quarter of a 27–32 loss to the Tennessee Titans after a shoulder injury. On November 27, 2024, the Texans officially placed him on injured reserve for the remainder of the season after discovering he tore a pectoral muscle and would have to undergo surgery. He was inactive for the last five games (Weeks 13–18) of the 2024 NFL season. He had a total of 65 combined tackles (44 solo), eight pass deflections, a forced fumble, and one interception in 12 games and 12 starts. He received an overall grade of 73.9 from Pro Football Focus, which ranked 19th among all qualifying safeties in 2024.

=== 2025 ===
On April 11, 2025, the Houston Texans signed Pitre to a three–year, $39 million contract extension that includes $29.15 million guaranteed, $20.65 million guaranteed upon signing, and an initial signing bonus of $10.00 million.

== NFL career statistics ==
Legend
	Led the league
**Bold**	Career high

=== Regular season ===
Year	Team	Games		Tackles					Interceptions						Fumbles				
Year	Team	GP	GS	Cmb	Solo	Ast	Sck	TFL	Int	Yds	Avg	Lng	TD	PD	FF	Fum	FR	Yds	TD
2022	HOU	**17**	**17**	**147**	**99**	**48**	**1.0**	5	**5**	**57**	**11.4**	**29**	0	8	0	**1**	**1**	0	0
2023	HOU	15	15	84	58	26	0.0	**6**	0	0	0.0	0	0	5	**1**	0	**1**	**22**	0
2024	HOU	12	12	65	44	21	0.0	**6**	1	10	10.0	10	0	8	**1**	0	0	0	0
2025	HOU	14	13	74	43	31	0.0	3	4	18	4.5	12	0	**12**	0	0	0	0	0
Career		58	57	370	244	126	1.0	20	10	85	8.5	29	0	33	2	1	2	22	0

=== Postseason ===
Year	Team	Games		Tackles					Interceptions						Fumbles				
Year	Team	GP	GS	Cmb	Solo	Ast	Sck	TFL	Int	Yds	Avg	Lng	TD	PD	FF	Fum	FR	Yds	TD
2023	HOU	**2**	**2**	9	6	**3**	0.0	0	0	0	0.0	0	0	**1**	0	0	0	0	0
2025	HOU	**2**	**2**	**12**	**9**	**3**	0.0	**4**	0	0	0.0	0	0	0	0	0	0	0	0
Career		4	4	21	15	6	0.0	4	0	0	0.0	0	0	1	0	0	0	0	0
