= 2022 Houston Texans season =

21st season in franchise history

- Owner: Janice and D. Cal McNair
- General manager: Nick Caserio
- Head coach: Lovie Smith
- Home stadium: NRG Stadium

Results
- Record: 3–13–1
- Division place: 4th AFC South
- Playoffs: Did not qualify
- Pro Bowlers: OT Laremy Tunsil

Uniform
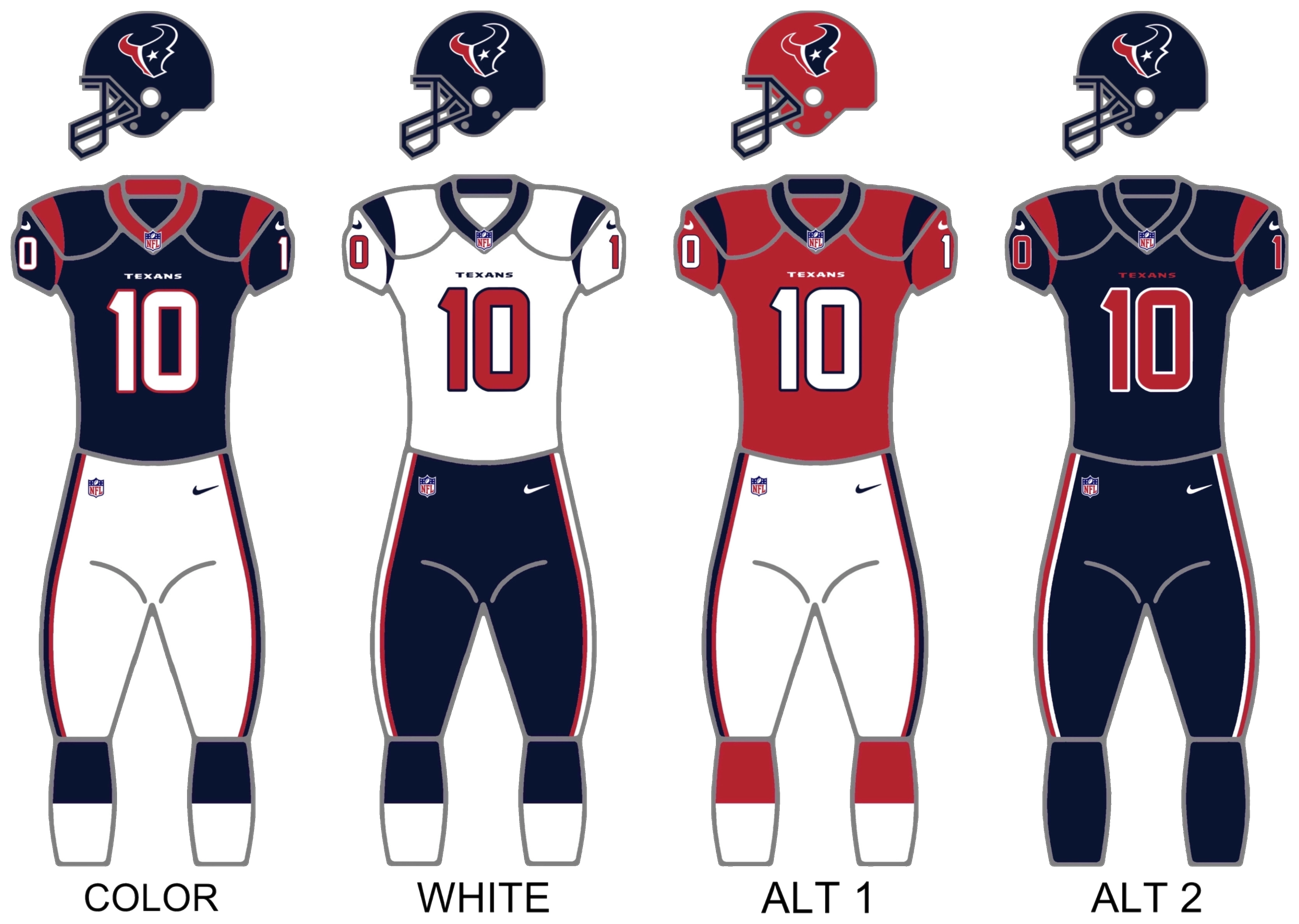

The 2022 season was the Houston Texans' 21st in the National Football League (NFL) and their only season under Lovie Smith, following the firing of David Culley at the end of the 2021 season.

This was their first season since 2016 without quarterback Deshaun Watson on the roster, as he was traded to the Cleveland Browns on March 18.

The Texans recorded their first tie in franchise history against the Indianapolis Colts in Week 1. However, the Texans struggled as they had their worst start since 2005. Houston was the first team to be eliminated from playoff contention for the second consecutive season in Week 13, becoming the first NFL team to do this in back-to-back seasons since the Cleveland Browns accomplished this feat in 2016 and 2017. The Texans failed to improve upon their 4–13 record from the previous year, and posted a 9-game losing streak from Week 7 to Week 15, their worst losing streak since 2013. They failed to win a home game in 2022, going 0–7–1 at NRG Stadium. Hours after their season-ending win against the Colts, the Texans parted ways with head coach Lovie Smith after only one season with the organization, marking the third consecutive year that the team fired its head coach. As of 2026, this is the most recent season the Texans missed the playoffs, finished with a losing record, and finished in last place in the AFC South.

== Draft ==
2022 Houston Texans Draft
Round	Selection	Player	Position	College	Notes
1	3	Derek Stingley Jr.	CB	LSU	
1	13	Traded to Philadelphia (Note: The Texans traded a first-round selection (13th overall) to the Philadelphia Eagles in exchange for a first-, a fourth- and two fifth-round selections (15th, 124th, 162nd and 166th overall).)			from Cleveland (Note: The Texans traded QB Deshaun Watson and a 2024 sixth-round selection to the Cleveland Browns in exchange for first- and fourth-round selections (13th and 107th overall), as well as 2023 and 2024 first-round selections, a 2023 third-round selection, and a 2024 fourth-round selection.)
1	15	Kenyon Green	OG	Texas A&M	from Miami via Philadelphia
2	37	Jalen Pitre	S	Baylor	
2	44	John Metchie III	WR	Alabama	from Cleveland (Note: The Texans traded a third- and two fourth-round selections (68th, 108th and 124th overall) to the Cleveland Browns in exchange for a second-round selection (44th overall).)
3	68	Traded to Cleveland			
3	75	Christian Harris	LB	Alabama	from Denver (Note: The Texans traded third- and fifth-round selections (80th and 162nd overall) to the Denver Broncos in exchange for a third-round selection (75th overall).)
3	80	Traded to Denver			from New Orleans (Note: The Texans traded CB Bradley Roby to the New Orleans Saints in exchange for a third-round selection (80th overall).)
4	107	Dameon Pierce	RB	Florida	from Detroit via Cleveland
4	108	Traded to Cleveland			
4	124	Traded to Cleveland			from Philadelphia
4	137	Traded to Carolina (Note: The Texans traded a fourth-round selection (137th overall), as well as 2021 fourth- and fifth-round selections to the Carolina Panthers in exchange for a 2021 third-round selection.)			from LA Rams (Note: The Texans traded a 2020 second-round selection to the Los Angeles Rams in exchange for WR Brandin Cooks and a fourth-round selection (137th overall).)
5	148	Traded to Chicago (Note: The Texans traded a fifth-round selection (148th overall) to the Chicago Bears in exchange for WR Anthony Miller and a seventh-round selection (228th overall).)			
5	150	Thomas Booker	DT	Stanford	from Chicago (Note: The Texans traded fifth- and sixth-round selections (166th and 207th overall) to the Chicago Bears in exchange for a fifth-round selection (150th overall).)
5	162	Traded to Denver			from Philadelphia
5	166	Traded to Chicago			from Arizona via Philadelphia
5	170	Teagan Quitoriano	TE	Oregon State	from Tampa Bay via New England (Note: The Texans traded sixth- and seventh-round selections (183rd and 245th) to the New England Patriots in exchange for a fifth-round selection (170th overall).)
6	183	Traded to New England			
6	205	Austin Deculus	OT	LSU	from Green Bay (Note: The Texans traded WR Randall Cobb to the Green Bay Packers in exchange for a sixth-round selection (205th overall).)
6	207	Traded to Chicago			from San Francisco via NY Jets (Note: The Texans traded LB Shaq Lawson to the New York Jets in exchange for a sixth-round selection (207th overall).)
7	224	Traded to New England (Note: The Texans traded a seventh-round selection (224th overall) to the New England Patriots in exchange for TE Ryan Izzo.)			
7	228	Traded to Green Bay (Note: The Texans traded a seventh-round selection (228th overall) to the Green Bay Packers in exchange for CB Ka'dar Hollman.)			from Chicago
7	245	Traded to New England			from Dallas (Note: The Texans traded DT Eli Ankou to the Dallas Cowboys in exchange for a seventh-round selection (245th overall).)

Draft trades

2022 Houston Texans undrafted free agents
Name	Position	College	Ref.
Myron Cunningham	OT	Arkansas	
Damion Daniels	DT	Nebraska	
Drew Estrada	WR	Baylor	
Jacobi Francis	DB	Memphis	
Seth Green	TE	Minnesota	
Jake Hansen	LB	Illinois	
Kolby Harvell-Peel	DB	Oklahoma State	
Kurt Hinish	DL	Notre Dame	
Johnny Johnson III	WR	Oregon	
Tristin McCollum	DB	Sam Houston State	

== Staff ==
=== Offseason changes ===
==== Head coach ====
The Houston Texans fired first-year head coach David Culley on January 13, 2022, who most notably led the Texans to a win at AFC No. 1 seed Tennessee Titans.

=== Final staff ===
2022 Houston Texans staff
Front office: Owner/senior chairwoman – Janice McNair; CEO/chairman – Cal McNair; President – Greg Grissom; General manager – Nick Caserio; Executive vice president of football operations – Vacant; Executive vice president/general counsel – Greg Kondritz; Director of football operations – Clay Hampton; Assistant director of player personnel and college scouting director – James Liipfert; Director of pro personnel – Ronnie McGill; Assistant director of pro scouting – D.J. Debick; Director of team development – Dylan Thompson; Head coaches: Head coach – Lovie Smith; Offensive coaches: Offensive coordinator – Pep Hamilton; Running backs – Danny Barrett; Wide receivers/pass game coordinator – Ben McDaniels; Tight ends – Tim Berbenich; Offensive line – George Warhop; Assistant offensive line – Hal Hunter; Offensive assistant – Jarrod James; Offensive assistant – DeNarius McGhee; Offensive assistant – Robbie Picazo; Offensive assistant/quarterbacks – Ted White	Defensive coaches: Defensive line – Jacques Cesaire; Assistant defensive line – Kenyon Jackson; Linebackers – Miles Smith; Cornerbacks – Dino Vasso; Safeties – Joe Danna; Defensive assistant – Ben Bolling; Defensive assistant/nickels – Ilir Emini; Defensive assistant – Dele Harding; Special teams coaches: Special teams coordinator – Frank Ross; Assistant special teams – Sean Baker; Strength and conditioning: Head strength and conditioning – Mike Eubanks; Assistant strength and conditioning coach – James Hardy; Assistant strength and conditioning coach – Joe Distor; Assistant strength and conditioning coach – Pat Moorer

== Final roster ==
2022 Houston Texans roster
Quarterbacks (QB): 3 Kyle Allen; 6 Jeff Driskel; 10 Davis Mills; Running backs (RB): 28 Rex Burkhead; 26 Royce Freeman; 34 Troy Hairston; 33 Dare Ogunbowale; Wide receivers (WR): 13 Brandin Cooks; 2 Phillip Dorsett; 15 Chris Moore; 19 Amari Rodgers; Tight ends (TE): 88 Jordan Akins; 83 O. J. Howard; 9 Brevin Jordan; 84 Teagan Quitoriano	Offensive linemen (OL): 60 A. J. Cann G; 76 Austin Deculus T; 59 Kenyon Green G; 67 Charlie Heck T; 71 Tytus Howard T/G; 64 Justin McCray G; 79 Jimmy Morrissey C; 54 Scott Quessenberry C; 78 Laremy Tunsil T; Defensive linemen (DL): 97 Mario Addison DE; 56 Thomas Booker DT; 96 Maliek Collins DT; 92 Rasheem Green DE; 52 Jonathan Greenard DE; 93 Kurt Hinish DT; 55 Jerry Hughes DE; 91 Roy Lopez DT; 45 Ogbo Okoronkwo DE	Linebackers (LB): 53 Blake Cashman OLB/MLB; 49 Jake Hansen OLB; 48 Christian Harris OLB; 43 Neville Hewitt MLB/OLB; 58 Christian Kirksey MLB; 44 Jalen Reeves-Maybin OLB; 32 Garret Wallow OLB; Defensive backs (DB): 35 Grayland Arnold SS; 38 Jacobi Francis CB; 25 Desmond King CB; 23 Eric Murray SS; 21 Steven Nelson CB; 36 Jonathan Owens SS; 5 Jalen Pitre FS; 1 Tremon Smith CB; 29 M. J. Stewart FS; 2 Tavierre Thomas CB; Special teams (ST): 7 Kaʻimi Fairbairn K; 11 Cameron Johnston P; 46 Jon Weeks LS	Practice squad: 14 Alex Bachman WR; 17 Jalen Camp WR (PS/I); 16 Davion Davis WR; 20 Gerrid Doaks RB; 81 Drew Estrada WR (PS/I); 94 Demone Harris DE; 41 Buddy Johnson MLB; 89 Johnny Johnson III WR; 39 Tristin McCollum FS; 62 K. C. McDermott T; 18 D. J. Montgomery WR; 75 Adedayo Odeleye DE (IPP); 22 Will Redmond CB; 37 D'Angelo Ross CB; 86 Mason Schreck TE; 70 Jordan Steckler T; 82 Malik Turner WR; 73 Tre'Vour Wallace-Simms G; Reserve: 30 Darius Anderson RB (IR); 68 Justin Britt C (NF-Ill.); 12 Nico Collins WR (IR); 8 John Metchie III WR (NF-Ill.); 31 Dameon Pierce RB (IR); 57 Kevin Pierre-Louis OLB (IR); 95 Derek Rivers DE (IR); 90 Taylor Stallworth DT (IR); 24 Derek Stingley Jr. CB (IR); Rookies in italics 53 active, 9 reserve, 15 practice squad (3 exempt)

== Preseason ==
Week	Date	Opponent	Result	Record	Venue	Recap
1	August 13	New Orleans Saints	W 17–13	1–0	NRG Stadium	Recap
2	August 19	at Los Angeles Rams	W 24–20	2–0	SoFi Stadium	Recap
3	August 25	San Francisco 49ers	W 17–0	3–0	NRG Stadium	Recap

== Regular season ==
=== Schedule ===
Week	Date	Opponent	Result	Record	Venue	Recap
1	September 11	**Indianapolis Colts**	**T** 20–20 (OT)	0–0–1	NRG Stadium	Recap
2	September 18	at Denver Broncos	**L** 9–16	0–1–1	Empower Field at Mile High	Recap
3	September 25	at Chicago Bears	**L** 20–23	0–2–1	Soldier Field	Recap
4	October 2	Los Angeles Chargers	**L** 24–34	0–3–1	NRG Stadium	Recap
5	October 9	at **Jacksonville Jaguars**	**W** 13–6	1–3–1	TIAA Bank Field	Recap
6	Bye					
7	October 23	at Las Vegas Raiders	**L** 20–38	1–4–1	Allegiant Stadium	Recap
8	October 30	**Tennessee Titans**	**L** 10–17	1–5–1	NRG Stadium	Recap
9	November 3	Philadelphia Eagles	**L** 17–29	1–6–1	NRG Stadium	Recap
10	November 13	at New York Giants	**L** 16–24	1–7–1	MetLife Stadium	Recap
11	November 20	Washington Commanders	**L** 10–23	1–8–1	NRG Stadium	Recap
12	November 27	at Miami Dolphins	**L** 15–30	1–9–1	Hard Rock Stadium	Recap
13	December 4	Cleveland Browns	**L** 14–27	1–10–1	NRG Stadium	Recap
14	December 11	at Dallas Cowboys	**L** 23–27	1–11–1	AT&T Stadium	Recap
15	December 18	Kansas City Chiefs	**L** 24–30 (OT)	1–12–1	NRG Stadium	Recap
16	December 24	at **Tennessee Titans**	**W** 19–14	2–12–1	Nissan Stadium	Recap
17	January 1	**Jacksonville Jaguars**	**L** 3–31	2–13–1	NRG Stadium	Recap
18	January 8	at **Indianapolis Colts**	**W** 32–31	3–13–1	Lucas Oil Stadium	Recap

Note: Intra-division opponents are in bold text.

=== Game summaries ===
==== Week 1: vs. Indianapolis Colts ====
Week 1: Indianapolis Colts at Houston Texans – Game summary

Quarter	1	2	3	4	OT	Total
Colts	3	0	0	17	0	**20**
Texans	0	10	10	0	0	**20**

at NRG Stadium, Houston, Texas

- Date: September 11
- Game time: 12:00 p.m. CDT
- Game weather: None (retractable roof closed)
- Game attendance: 69,415
- Referee: Land Clark
- TV announcers (CBS): Tom McCarthy and Tiki Barber
- Recap, Game Book

Game information

**First quarter**

- IND – Rodrigo Blankenship 45-yard field goal, 5:13. Colts 3–0. **Drive: 12 plays, 47 yards, 6:46.**

**Second quarter**

- HOU – Kaʻimi Fairbairn 45-yard field goal, 7:50. Tied 3–3. **Drive: 14 plays, 69 yards, 6:20.**
- HOU – O. J. Howard 16-yard pass from Davis Mills (Kaʻimi Fairbairn kick), 2:37. Texans 10–3. **Drive: 4 plays, 58 yards, 1:49.**

**Third quarter**

- HOU – Kaʻimi Fairbairn 43-yard field goal, 12:17. Texans 13–3. **Drive: 5 plays, 50 yards, 2:43.**
- HOU – O. J. Howard 22-yard pass from Davis Mills (Kaʻimi Fairbairn kick), 7:16. Texans 20–3. **Drive: 4 plays, 58 yards, 1:40.**

**Fourth quarter**

- IND – Rodrigo Blankenship 27-yard field goal, 10:44. Texans 20–6. **Drive: 11 plays, 76 yards, 4:02.**
- IND – Jonathan Taylor 2-yard run (Rodrigo Blankenship kick), 7:42. Texans 20–13. **Drive: 4 plays, 20 yards, 2:07.**
- IND – Michael Pittman Jr. 15-yard pass from Matt Ryan (Rodrigo Blankenship kick), 1:54. Tied 20–20. **Drive: 7 plays, 80 yards, 2:35.**

**Overtime**

- No scoring plays

**Top passers**

- IND – Matt Ryan – 32/50, 352 yards, TD, INT
- HOU – Davis Mills – 23/37, 240 yards, 2 TD

**Top rushers**

- IND – Jonathan Taylor – 31 rushes, 161 yards, TD
- HOU – Rex Burkhead – 14 rushes, 40 yards

**Top receivers**

- IND – Michael Pittman Jr. – 9 receptions, 121 yards, TD
- HOU – Brandin Cooks – 7 receptions, 82 yards

This was the first tie in franchise history.

==== Week 2: at Denver Broncos ====
Week 2: Houston Texans at Denver Broncos – Game summary

Quarter	1	2	3	4	Total
Texans	3	3	3	0	**9**
**Broncos**	3	3	0	10	**16**

at Empower Field at Mile High, Denver, Colorado

- Date: September 18
- Game time: 3:25 p.m. CDT/2:25 p.m. MDT
- Game weather: Sunny, 77 °F (25 °C)
- Game attendance: 76,191
- Referee: Carl Cheffers
- TV announcers (CBS): Andrew Catalon, James Lofton and Michael Grady
- Recap, Game Book

Game information

**First quarter**

- DEN – Brandon McManus 20-yard field goal, 5:30. Broncos 3–0. **Drive: 8 plays, 63 yards, 2:18.**
- HOU – Kaʻimi Fairbairn 40-yard field goal, 2:19. Tied 3–3. **Drive: 10 plays, 54 yards, 3:11.**

**Second quarter**

- HOU – Kaʻimi Fairbairn 44-yard field goal, 7:20. Texans 6–3. **Drive: 10 plays, 54 yards, 5:32.**
- DEN – Brandon McManus 24-yard field goal, 0:20. Tied 6–6. **Drive: 9 plays, 70 yards, 3:44.**

**Third quarter**

- HOU – Kaʻimi Fairbairn 24-yard field goal, 8:33. Texans 9–6. **Drive: 11 plays, 39 yards, 5:09.**

**Fourth quarter**

- DEN – Eric Saubert 22-yard pass from Russell Wilson (Brandon McManus kick), 12:37. Broncos 13–9. **Drive: 6 plays, 62 yards, 3:56.**
- DEN – Brandon McManus 50-yard field goal, 3:36. Broncos 16–9. **Drive: 12 plays, 54 yards, 6:12.**

**Top passers**

- HOU – Davis Mills – 19/38, 177 yards
- DEN – Russell Wilson – 14/31, 219 yards, TD, INT

**Top rushers**

- HOU – Dameon Pierce – 15 rushes, 69 yards
- DEN – Javonte Williams – 15 rushes, 75 yards

**Top receivers**

- HOU – Nico Collins – 4 receptions, 58 yards
- DEN – Courtland Sutton – 7 receptions, 122 yards

==== Week 3: at Chicago Bears ====
Week 3: Houston Texans at Chicago Bears – Game summary

Quarter	1	2	3	4	Total
Texans	7	7	6	0	**20**
**Bears**	10	3	7	3	**23**

at Soldier Field, Chicago, Illinois

- Date: September 25
- Game time: 12:00 p.m. CDT
- Game weather: Cloudy, 66 °F (19 °C)
- Game attendance: 60,592
- Referee: Clete Blakeman
- TV announcers (CBS): Andrew Catalon, James Lofton and Michael Grady
- Recap, Game Book

Game information

**First quarter**

- CHI – Cairo Santos 47-yard field goal, 11:22. Bears 3–0. **Drive: 9 plays, 45 yards, 3:38.**
- CHI – Khalil Herbert 11-yard run (Cairo Santos kick), 6:45. Bears 10–0. **Drive: 6 plays, 81 yards, 3:16.**
- HOU – Jordan Akins 4-yard pass from Davis Mills (Kaʻimi Fairbairn kick), 3:40. Bears 10–7. **Drive: 7 plays, 75 yards, 3:05.**

**Second quarter**

- HOU – Dameon Pierce 1-yard run (Kaʻimi Fairbairn kick), 7:32. Texans 14–10. **Drive: 4 plays, 41 yards, 2:07.**
- CHI – Cairo Santos 50-yard field goal, 1:48. Texans 14–13. **Drive: 12 plays, 50 yards, 5:44.**

**Third quarter**

- HOU – Kaʻimi Fairbairn 39-yard field goal, 11:25. Texans 17–13. **Drive: 7 plays, 54 yards, 3:35.**
- CHI – Khalil Herbert 1-yard run (Cairo Santos kick), 8:25. Bears 20–17. **Drive: 5 plays, 75 yards, 3:00.**
- HOU – Kaʻimi Fairbairn 23-yard field goal, 0:54. Tied 20–20. **Drive: 14 plays, 70 yards, 7:31.**

**Fourth quarter**

- CHI – Cairo Santos 30-yard field goal, 0:00. Bears 23–20. **Drive: 4 plays, 0 yards, 1:05.**

**Top passers**

- HOU – Davis Mills – 20/32, 245 yards, TD, 2 INT
- CHI – Justin Fields – 8/17, 106 yards, 2 INT

**Top rushers**

- HOU – Dameon Pierce – 20 rushes, 80 yards, TD
- CHI – Khalil Herbert – 20 rushes, 157 yards, 2 TD

**Top receivers**

- HOU – Rex Burkhead – 4 receptions, 21 yards
- CHI – Cole Kmet – 2 receptions, 40 yards

==== Week 4: vs. Los Angeles Chargers ====
Week 4: Los Angeles Chargers at Houston Texans – Game summary

Quarter	1	2	3	4	Total
**Chargers**	7	20	0	7	**34**
Texans	0	7	7	10	**24**

at NRG Stadium, Houston, Texas

- Date: October 2
- Game time: 12:00 p.m. CDT
- Game weather: None (retractable roof closed)
- Game attendance: 69,071
- Referee: Alex Kemp
- TV announcers (CBS): Beth Mowins, James Lofton and Amanda Renner
- Recap, Game Book

Game information

**First quarter**

- LAC – Gerald Everett 18-yard pass from Justin Herbert (Dustin Hopkins kick), 12:00. Chargers 7–0. **Drive: 3 plays, 25 yards, 1:28.**

**Second quarter**

- LAC – Austin Ekeler 10-yard run (Dustin Hopkins kick), 12:57. Chargers 14–0. **Drive: 9 plays, 64 yards, 4:22.**
- LAC – Austin Ekeler 20-yard run (Dustin Hopkins kick), 10:00. Chargers 21–0. **Drive: 3 plays, 73 yards, 1:18.**
- HOU – Dameon Pierce 75-yard run (Kaʻimi Fairbairn kick), 9:48. Chargers 21–7. **Drive: 1 play, 75 yards, 0:12.**
- LAC – Dustin Hopkins 23-yard field goal, 4:35. Chargers 24–7. **Drive: 10 plays, 77 yards, 5:13.**
- LAC – Dustin Hopkins 37-yard field goal, 0:08. Chargers 27–7. **Drive: 9 plays, 49 yards, 0:57.**

**Third quarter**

- HOU – Rex Burkhead 8-yard pass from Davis Mills (Kaʻimi Fairbairn kick), 1:12. Chargers 27–14. **Drive: 8 plays, 87 yards, 4:30.**

**Fourth quarter**

- HOU – Brandin Cooks 18-yard pass from Davis Mills (Kaʻimi Fairbairn kick), 10:02. Chargers 27–21. **Drive: 5 plays, 93 yards, 2:53.**
- HOU – Kaʻimi Fairbairn 40-yard field goal, 8:30. Chargers 27–24. **Drive: 4 plays, −6 yards, 1:28.**
- LAC – Austin Ekeler 14-yard pass from Justin Herbert (Dustin Hopkins kick), 2:28. Chargers 34–24. **Drive: 12 plays, 84 yards, 6:02.**

**Top passers**

- LAC – Justin Herbert – 27/39, 340 yards, 2 TD
- HOU – Davis Mills – 26/35, 246 yards, 2 TD, 2 INT

**Top rushers**

- LAC – Austin Ekeler – 13 rushes, 60 yards, 2 TD
- HOU – Dameon Pierce – 14 rushes, 131 yards, TD

**Top receivers**

- LAC – Mike Williams – 7 receptions, 120 yards
- HOU – Nico Collins – 3 receptions, 82 yards

==== Week 5: at Jacksonville Jaguars ====
Week 5: Houston Texans at Jacksonville Jaguars – Game summary

Quarter	1	2	3	4	Total
**Texans**	0	6	0	7	**13**
Jaguars	3	3	0	0	**6**

at TIAA Bank Field, Jacksonville, Florida

- Date: October 9
- Game time: 1:00 p.m. EDT/12:00 p.m. CDT
- Game weather: Partly cloudy and sunny, 80 °F (27 °C)
- Game attendance: 60,018
- Referee: Ronald Torbert
- TV announcers (CBS): Spero Dedes, Jay Feely and Aditi Kinkhabwala
- Recap, Game Book

Game information

**First quarter**

- JAX – Riley Patterson 26-yard field goal, 1:22. Jaguars 3–0. **Drive: 11 plays, 60 yards, 4:03.**

**Second quarter**

- HOU – Kaʻimi Fairbairn 50-yard field goal, 12:24. Tied 3–3. **Drive: 8 plays, 44 yards, 3:58.**
- HOU – Kaʻimi Fairbairn 51-yard field goal, 3:23. Texans 6–3. **Drive: 8 plays, 30 yards, 4:44.**
- JAX – Riley Patterson 45-yard field goal, 0:06. Tied 6–6. **Drive: 9 plays, 51 yards, 3:17.**

**Third quarter**

- No scoring plays.

**Fourth quarter**

- HOU – Dameon Pierce 1-yard run (Kaʻimi Fairbairn kick), 3:11. Texans 13–6. **Drive: 12 plays, 74 yards, 6:48.**

**Top passers**

- HOU – Davis Mills – 16/24, 140 yards
- JAX – Trevor Lawrence – 25/47, 286 yards, 2 INT

**Top rushers**

- HOU – Dameon Pierce – 26 rushes, 99 yards, TD
- JAX – Travis Etienne – 10 rushes, 71 yards

**Top receivers**

- HOU – Nico Collins – 4 receptions, 65 yards
- JAX – Marvin Jones – 7 receptions, 104 yards

==== Week 7: at Las Vegas Raiders ====
Week 7: Houston Texans at Las Vegas Raiders – Game summary

Quarter	1	2	3	4	Total
Texans	0	10	10	0	**20**
**Raiders**	3	7	7	21	**38**

at Allegiant Stadium, Paradise, Nevada

- Date: October 23
- Game time: 3:05 p.m. CDT/1:05 p.m. PDT
- Game weather: None (indoor stadium)
- Game attendance: 61,228
- Referee: John Hussey
- TV announcers (CBS): Greg Gumbel, Adam Archuleta and AJ Ross
- Recap, Game Book

Game information

**First quarter**

- LV – Daniel Carlson 50-yard field goal, 9:54. Raiders 3–0. **Drive: 11 plays, 44 yards, 5:06.**

**Second quarter**

- HOU – Chris Moore 13-yard pass from Davis Mills (Kaʻimi Fairbairn kick), 10:17. Texans 7–3. **Drive: 13 plays, 62 yards, 6:22.**
- HOU – Kaʻimi Fairbairn 55-yard field goal, 4:57. Texans 10–3. **Drive: 7 plays, 43 yards, 2:31.**
- LV – Mack Hollins 26-yard pass from Derek Carr (Daniel Carlson kick), 0:25. Tied 10–10. **Drive: 10 plays, 82 yards, 4:32.**

**Third quarter**

- HOU – Kaʻimi Fairbairn 35-yard field goal, 10:59. Texans 13–10. **Drive: 8 plays, 67 yards, 4:01.**
- LV – Josh Jacobs 4-yard run (Daniel Carlson kick), 5:48. Raiders 17–13. **Drive: 10 plays, 75 yards, 5:11.**
- HOU – Phillip Dorsett 25-yard pass from Davis Mills (Kaʻimi Fairbairn kick), 3:14. Texans 20–17. **Drive: 6 plays, 74 yards, 2:34.**

**Fourth quarter**

- LV – Josh Jacobs 7-yard run (Daniel Carlson kick), 13:32. Raiders 24–20. **Drive: 7 plays, 76 yards, 4:42.**
- LV – Josh Jacobs 15-yard run (Daniel Carlson kick), 7:06. Raiders 31–20. **Drive: 7 plays, 81 yards, 4:15.**
- LV – Duron Harmon 73-yard interception return (Daniel Carlson kick), 3:26. Raiders 38–20.

**Top passers**

- HOU – Davis Mills – 28/41, 302 yards, 2 TD, INT
- LV – Derek Carr – 21/27, 241 yards, TD

**Top rushers**

- HOU – Dameon Pierce – 20 rushes, 92 yards
- LV – Josh Jacobs – 20 rushes, 143 yards, 3 TD

**Top receivers**

- HOU – Jordan Akins – 3 receptions, 68 yards
- LV – Davante Adams – 8 receptions, 95 yards

==== Week 8: vs. Tennessee Titans ====
Week 8: Tennessee Titans at Houston Texans – Game summary

Quarter	1	2	3	4	Total
**Titans**	0	7	7	3	**17**
Texans	0	3	0	7	**10**

at NRG Stadium, Houston, Texas

- Date: October 30
- Game time: 3:05 p.m. CDT
- Game weather: None (retractable roof closed)
- Game attendance: 65,515
- Referee: Clay Martin
- TV announcers (CBS): Greg Gumbel, Adam Archuleta and AJ Ross
- Recap, Game Book

Game information

**First quarter**

- No scoring plays.

**Second quarter**

- HOU – Kaʻimi Fairbairn 43-yard field goal, 10:40. Texans 3–0. **Drive: 4 plays, −13 yards, 1:11.**
- TEN – Derrick Henry 29-yard run (Randy Bullock kick), 4:20. Titans 7–3. **Drive: 3 plays, 37 yards, 0:53.**

**Third quarter**

- TEN – Derrick Henry 1-yard run (Randy Bullock kick), 6:31. Titans 14–3. **Drive: 9 plays, 65 yards, 6:19.**

**Fourth quarter**

- TEN – Randy Bullock 29-yard field goal, 11:08. Titans 17–3. **Drive: 12 plays, 81 yards, 7:16.**
- HOU – Dameon Pierce 3-yard pass from Davis Mills (Kaʻimi Fairbairn kick), 0:17. Titans 17–10. **Drive: 12 plays, 90 yards, 3:46.**

**Top passers**

- TEN – Malik Willis – 6/10, 55 yards, INT
- HOU – Davis Mills – 17/29, 152 yards, TD, INT

**Top rushers**

- TEN – Derrick Henry – 32 rushes, 219 yards, 2 TD
- HOU – Dameon Pierce – 15 rushes, 35 yards

**Top receivers**

- TEN – Robert Woods – 2 receptions, 26 yards
- HOU – Brandin Cooks – 4 receptions, 73 yards

==== Week 9: vs. Philadelphia Eagles ====
Week 9: Philadelphia Eagles at Houston Texans – Game summary

Quarter	1	2	3	4	Total
**Eagles**	7	7	7	8	**29**
Texans	7	7	3	0	**17**

at NRG Stadium, Houston, Texas

- Date: November 3
- Game time: 7:15 p.m. CDT
- Game weather: None (retractable roof closed)
- Game attendance: 68,831
- Referee: Craig Wrolstad
- TV announcers (KTXH/Prime Video): Al Michaels, Kirk Herbstreit and Kaylee Hartung
- Recap, Game Book

Game information

**First quarter**

- HOU – Teagan Quitoriano 2-yard pass from Davis Mills (Kaʻimi Fairbairn kick), 9:37. Texans 7–0. **Drive: 9 plays, 75 yards, 5:23.**
- PHI – Miles Sanders 2-yard run (Jake Elliott kick), 1:33. Tied 7–7. **Drive: 18 plays, 91 yards, 8:04.**

**Second quarter**

- PHI – Kenneth Gainwell 4-yard run (Jake Elliott kick), 4:32. Eagles 14–7. **Drive: 10 plays, 79 yards, 5:32.**
- HOU – Chris Moore 13-yard pass from Davis Mills (Kaʻimi Fairbairn kick), 0:37. Tied 14–14. **Drive: 7 plays, 75 yards, 3:55.**

**Third quarter**

- PHI – A. J. Brown 17-yard pass from Jalen Hurts (Jake Elliott kick), 8:04. Eagles 21–14. **Drive: 2 plays, 17 yards, 0:09.**
- HOU – Kaʻimi Fairbairn 30-yard field goal, 1:15. Eagles 21–17. **Drive: 12 plays, 63 yards, 6:49.**

**Fourth quarter**

- PHI – Dallas Goedert 4-yard pass from Jalen Hurts (Jalen Hurts run), 11:22. Eagles 29–17. **Drive: 10 plays, 75 yards, 4:53.**

**Top passers**

- PHI – Jalen Hurts – 21/27, 243 yards, 2 TD
- HOU – Davis Mills – 13/22, 154 yards, 2 TD, 2 INT

**Top rushers**

- PHI – Miles Sanders – 17 rushes, 93 yards, TD
- HOU – Dameon Pierce – 27 rushes, 139 yards

**Top receivers**

- PHI – Dallas Goedert – 8 receptions, 100 yards, TD
- HOU – Phillip Dorsett – 3 receptions, 69 yards

This was played the same day as Game 5 of the 2022 World Series between the Houston Astros and the Philadelphia Phillies, moved back by one day due to rain in Philadelphia earlier in the week. Estimates from Nielsen Media Research show the baseball game drew an average of five million more viewers, with a share of at least 50 in both Philadelphia and Houston. Meanwhile, the football game, originally scheduled to air on the Fox affiliates in both markets per NFL rules, moved to the MyNetworkTV affiliates in both markets.

==== Week 10: at New York Giants ====
Week 10: Houston Texans at New York Giants – Game summary

Quarter	1	2	3	4	Total
Texans	0	3	7	6	**16**
**Giants**	7	0	14	3	**24**

at MetLife Stadium, East Rutherford, New Jersey

- Date: November 13
- Game time: 1:00 p.m. EST/12:00 p.m. CST
- Game weather: Partly sunny, 50 °F (10 °C)
- Game attendance: 71,615
- Referee: Bill Vinovich
- TV announcers (CBS): Ian Eagle, Charles Davis and Evan Washburn
- Recap, Game Book

Game information

**First quarter**

- NYG – Lawrence Cager 9-yard pass from Daniel Jones (Graham Gano kick), 7:51. Giants 7–0. **Drive: 10 plays, 68 yards, 5:22.**

**Second quarter**

- HOU – Kaʻimi Fairbairn 38-yard field goal, 11:27. Giants 7–3. **Drive: 7 plays, 61 yards, 3:26.**

**Third quarter**

- NYG – Darius Slayton 54-yard pass from Daniel Jones (Graham Gano kick), 12:33. Giants 14–3. **Drive: 5 plays, 75 yards, 2:27.**
- HOU – Nico Collins 12-yard pass from Davis Mills (Kaʻimi Fairbairn kick), 8:06. Giants 14–10. **Drive: 7 plays, 75 yards, 4:27.**
- NYG – Saquon Barkley 2-yard run (Graham Gano kick), 2:21. Giants 21–10. **Drive: 12 plays, 74 yards, 5:45.**

**Fourth quarter**

- HOU – Kaʻimi Fairbairn 34-yard field goal, 2:22. Giants 21–13. **Drive: 12 plays, 76 yards, 2:18.**
- NYG – Graham Gano 49-yard field goal, 1:55. Giants 24–13. **Drive: 4 plays, 8 yards, 0:27.**
- HOU – Kaʻimi Fairbairn 46-yard field goal, 0:07. Giants 24–16. **Drive: 5 plays, 48 yards, 1:48.**

**Top passers**

- HOU – Davis Mills – 22/37, 319 yards, TD, INT
- NYG – Daniel Jones – 13/17, 197 yards, 2 TD

**Top rushers**

- HOU – Dameon Pierce – 17 rushes, 94 yards
- NYG – Saquon Barkley – 35 rushes, 152 yards, TD

**Top receivers**

- HOU – Jordan Akins – 3 receptions, 72 yards
- NYG – Darius Slayton – 3 receptions, 95 yards, TD

==== Week 11: vs. Washington Commanders ====
Week 11: Washington Commanders at Houston Texans – Game summary

Quarter	1	2	3	4	Total
**Commanders**	7	13	0	3	**23**
Texans	0	0	3	7	**10**

at NRG Stadium, Houston, Texas

- Date: November 20
- Game time: 12:00 p.m. CST
- Game weather: None (retractable roof closed)
- Game attendance: 65,865
- Referee: Scott Novak
- TV announcers (Fox): Chris Myers, Robert Smith and Jen Hale
- Recap, Game Book

Game information

**First quarter**

- WSH – Kendall Fuller 37-yard interception return (Joey Slye kick), 13:16. Commanders 7–0.

**Second quarter**

- WSH – Curtis Samuel 10-yard run (Joey Slye kick), 11:44. Commanders 14–0. **Drive: 9 plays, 85 yards, 5:11.**
- WSH – Joey Slye 25-yard field goal, 4:53. Commanders 17–0. **Drive: 10 plays, 54 yards, 4:50.**
- WSH – Joey Slye 24-yard field goal, 0:07. Commanders 20–0. **Drive: 11 plays, 61 yards, 2:53.**

**Third quarter**

- HOU – Kaʻimi Fairbairn 29-yard field goal, 9:53. Commanders 20–3. **Drive: 11 plays, 64 yards, 5:07.**

**Fourth quarter**

- WSH – Joey Slye 44-yard field goal, 12:08. Commanders 23–3. **Drive: 10 plays, 20 yards, 6:31.**
- HOU – Davis Mills 4-yard run (Kaʻimi Fairbairn kick), 3:19. Commanders 23–10. **Drive: 11 plays, 55 yards, 4:20.**

**Top passers**

- WSH – Taylor Heinicke – 15/27, 191 yards
- HOU – Davis Mills – 19/33, 169 yards, 2 INT

**Top rushers**

- WSH – Antonio Gibson – 18 rushes, 72 yards
- HOU – Davis Mills – 5 rushes, 10 yards, TD

**Top receivers**

- WSH – Logan Thomas – 5 receptions, 65 yards
- HOU – Brandin Cooks – 3 receptions, 70 yards

==== Week 12: at Miami Dolphins ====
Week 12: Houston Texans at Miami Dolphins – Game summary

Quarter	1	2	3	4	Total
Texans	0	0	6	9	**15**
**Dolphins**	10	20	0	0	**30**

at Hard Rock Stadium, Miami Gardens, Florida

- Date: November 27
- Game time: 1:00 p.m. EST/12:00 p.m. CST
- Game weather: Partly cloudy, 87 °F (31 °C)
- Game attendance: 66,205
- Referee: Jerome Boger
- TV announcers (CBS): Spero Dedes, Jay Feely and Aditi Kinkhabwala
- Recap, Game Book

Game information

**First quarter**

- MIA – Jason Sanders 45-yard field goal, 10:21. Dolphins 3–0. **Drive: 9 plays, 39 yards, 3:01.**
- MIA – Durham Smythe 4-yard pass from Tua Tagovailoa (Jason Sanders kick), 2:57. Dolphins 10–0. **Drive: 8 plays, 59 yards, 4:44.**

**Second quarter**

- MIA – Jeff Wilson 3-yard run (Jason Sanders kick), 12:22. Dolphins 17–0. **Drive: 1 play, 3 yards, 0:05.**
- MIA – Jason Sanders 23-yard field goal, 6:22. Dolphins 20–0. **Drive: 10 plays, 72 yards, 4:32.**
- MIA – Xavien Howard 16-yard fumble return (Jason Sanders kick), 4:59. Dolphins 27–0.
- MIA – Jason Sanders 35-yard field goal, 0:00. Dolphins 30–0. **Drive: 11 plays, 71 yards, 1:52.**

**Third quarter**

- HOU – Dare Ogunbowale 3-yard run (run failed), 3:18. Dolphins 30–6. **Drive: 6 plays, 64 yards, 3:10.**

**Fourth quarter**

- HOU – Jordan Akins 25-yard pass from Kyle Allen (pass failed), 12:46. Dolphins 30–12. **Drive: 6 plays, 50 yards, 2:25.**
- HOU – Kaʻimi Fairbairn 28-yard field goal, 9:00. Dolphins 30–15. **Drive: 8 plays, 57 yards, 2:47.**

**Top passers**

- HOU – Kyle Allen – 26/39, 215 yards, TD, 2 INT
- MIA – Tua Tagovailoa – 22/36, 299 yards, TD

**Top rushers**

- HOU – Dare Ogunbowale – 4 rushes, 14 yards, TD
- MIA – Jeff Wilson – 13 rushes, 39 yards, TD

**Top receivers**

- HOU – Jordan Akins – 5 receptions, 61 yards, TD
- MIA – Tyreek Hill – 6 receptions, 85 yards

==== Week 13: vs. Cleveland Browns ====
Week 13: Cleveland Browns at Houston Texans – Game summary

Quarter	1	2	3	4	Total
**Browns**	0	7	7	13	**27**
Texans	3	2	3	6	**14**

at NRG Stadium, Houston, Texas

- Date: December 4
- Game time: 12:00 p.m. CST
- Game weather: None (retractable roof closed)
- Game attendance: 66,523
- Referee: Land Clark
- TV announcers (CBS): Spero Dedes, Jay Feely and Aditi Kinkhabwala
- Recap, Game Book

Game information

**First quarter**

- HOU – Kaʻimi Fairbairn 44-yard field goal, 8:02. Texans 3–0. **Drive: 8 plays, 13 yards, 3:51.**

**Second quarter**

- HOU – Nick Chubb tackled in end zone, 11:53. Texans 5–0.
- CLE – Donovan Peoples-Jones 76-yard punt return (Cade York kick), 3:41. Browns 7–5.

**Third quarter**

- CLE – Denzel Ward 4-yard fumble return (Cade York kick), 10:10. Browns 14–5.
- HOU – Kaʻimi Fairbairn 35-yard field goal, 5:08. Browns 14–8. **Drive: 7 plays, 59 yards, 5:02.**

**Fourth quarter**

- CLE – Cade York 43-yard field goal, 9:36. Browns 17–8. **Drive: 11 plays, 42 yards, 5:58.**
- CLE – Tony Fields II 16-yard interception return (Cade York kick), 9:30. Browns 24–8.
- CLE – Cade York 42-yard field goal, 4:03. Browns 27–8. **Drive: 4 plays, 8 yards, 1:26.**
- HOU – Nico Collins 6-yard pass from Kyle Allen (pass failed), 1:57. Browns 27–14. **Drive: 7 plays, 75 yards, 2:06.**

**Top passers**

- CLE – Deshaun Watson – 12/22, 131 yards, INT
- HOU – Kyle Allen – 20/39, 201 yards, TD, 2 INT

**Top rushers**

- CLE – Nick Chubb – 17 rushes, 80 yards
- HOU – Dameon Pierce – 18 rushes, 73 yards

**Top receivers**

- CLE – Donovan Peoples-Jones – 3 receptions, 44 yards
- HOU – Chris Moore – 3 receptions, 46 yards

Cleveland quarterback Deshaun Watson made his first start since January 3, 2021 when he still played for Houston. Both offenses struggled throughout the game, with the game's only offensive touchdown coming with 1:57 left on a 6-yard Kyle Allen pass to wide receiver Nico Collins. However, Cleveland would score two defensive touchdowns and a special teams touchdown. With the loss, the Texans dropped to 1–10–1 and were mathematically eliminated from playoff contention for the second season in a row.

==== Week 14: at Dallas Cowboys ====
Week 14: Houston Texans at Dallas Cowboys – Game summary

Quarter	1	2	3	4	Total
Texans	10	10	3	0	**23**
**Cowboys**	7	10	0	10	**27**

at AT&T Stadium, Arlington, Texas

- Date: December 11
- Game time: 12:00 p.m. CST
- Game weather: None (retractable roof closed)
- Game attendance: 93,843
- Referee: John Hussey
- TV announcers (Fox): Kevin Kugler, Mark Sanchez and Laura Okmin
- Recap, Game Book

Game information

**First quarter**

- DAL – Tony Pollard 11-yard run (Brett Maher kick), 11:20. Cowboys 7–0. **Drive: 9 plays, 76 yards, 3:40.**
- HOU – Dameon Pierce 1-yard run (Kaʻimi Fairbairn kick), 5:33. Tied 7–7. **Drive: 6 plays, 24 yards, 3:28.**
- HOU – Kaʻimi Faribairn 43-yard field goal, 0:18. Texans 10–7. **Drive: 6 plays, 47 yards, 3:09.**

**Second quarter**

- DAL – Tony Pollard 10-yard pass from Dak Prescott (Brett Maher kick), 12:28. Cowboys 14–10. **Drive: 7 plays, 75 yards, 2:50.**
- HOU – Amari Rodgers 28-yard pass from Jeff Driskel (Kaʻimi Fairbairn kick), 2:23. Texans 17–14. **Drive: 2 plays, 27 yards, 0:49.**
- DAL – Brett Maher 33-yard field goal, 0:40. Tied 17–17. **Drive: 11 plays, 60 yards, 1:43.**
- HOU – Kaʻimi Fairbairn 50-yard field goal, 0:00. Texans 20–17. **Drive: 5 plays, 43 yards, 0:40.**

**Third quarter**

- HOU – Kaʻimi Fairbairn 54-yard field goal, 3:03. Texans 23–17. **Drive: 10 plays, 63 yards, 5:16.**

**Fourth quarter**

- DAL – Brett Maher 53-yard field goal, 14:50. Texans 23–20. **Drive: 9 plays, 40 yards, 3:13.**
- DAL – Ezekiel Elliott 2-yard run (Brett Maher kick), 0:41. Cowboys 27–23. **Drive: 11 plays, 98 yards, 2:39.**

**Top passers**

- HOU – Davis Mills – 16/21, 175 yards, INT
- DAL – Dak Prescott – 24/39, 284 yards, TD, 2 INT

**Top rushers**

- HOU – Dameon Pierce – 22 rushes, 78 yards, TD
- DAL – Ezekiel Elliott – 15 rushes, 62 yards, TD

**Top receivers**

- HOU – Chris Moore – 10 receptions, 124 yards
- DAL – Dalton Schultz – 6 receptions, 87 yards

The Texans held a 23–17 lead entering the fourth quarter but fell apart in the final minutes of the game. Cornerback Tremon Smith intercepted a Dak Prescott pass and returned it 7 yards to the Dallas 4-yard line; however, the offense failed to score a touchdown and turned the ball over on downs. Starting at their own 2-yard line, the Cowboys marched 98 yards down field with Ezekiel Elliott getting the go-ahead score on a 2-yard run with 0:41 left. Houston attempted to respond, making it as far as the Dallas 44-yard line, but two false start penalties on Laremy Tunsil pushed the Texans back to their own 46-yard line and a Davis Mills Hail Mary pass was intercepted in the end zone by Israel Mukuamu, sealing the victory for Dallas.

==== Week 15: vs. Kansas City Chiefs ====
Week 15: Kansas City Chiefs at Houston Texans – Game summary

Quarter	1	2	3	4	OT	Total
**Chiefs**	0	13	3	8	6	**30**
Texans	7	7	7	3	0	**24**

at NRG Stadium, Houston, Texas

- Date: December 18
- Game time: 12:00 p.m. CST
- Game weather: None (retractable roof closed)
- Game attendance: 70,541
- Referee: Carl Cheffers
- TV announcers (CBS): Kevin Harlan, Trent Green and Melanie Collins
- Recap, Game Book

Game information

**First quarter**

- HOU – Teagan Quitoriano 8-yard pass from Davis Mills (Kaʻimi Fairbairn kick), 1:01. Texans 7–0. **Drive: 11 plays, 80 yards, 5:42.**

**Second quarter**

- KC – Jerick McKinnon 20-yard pass from Patrick Mahomes (Harrison Butker kick), 12:27. Tied 7–7. **Drive: 7 plays, 75 yards, 3:34.**
- HOU – Davis Mills 17-yard run (Kaʻimi Fairbairn kick), 9:19. Texans 14–7. **Drive: 2 plays, 17 yards, 0:12.**
- KC – Marquez Valdes-Scantling 4-yard pass from Patrick Mahomes (kick failed), 0:14. Texans 14–13. **Drive: 13 plays, 97 yards, 3:52.**

**Third quarter**

- KC – Harrison Butker 27-yard field goal, 9:05. Chiefs 16–14. **Drive: 10 plays, 67 yards, 5:55.**
- HOU – Jordan Akins 12-yard pass from Davis Mills (Kaʻimi Fairbairn kick), 1:25. Texans 21–16. **Drive: 7 plays, 49 yards, 4:18.**

**Fourth quarter**

- KC – Patrick Mahomes 5-yard run (Patrick Mahomes–Jerick McKinnon pass), 11:57. Chiefs 24–21. **Drive: 9 plays, 84 yards, 4:28.**
- HOU – Kaʻimi Fairbairn 29-yard field goal, 5:11. Tied 24–24. **Drive: 15 plays, 65 yards, 6:46.**

**Overtime**

- KC – Jerick McKinnon 26-yard run, 5:13. Chiefs 30–24. **Drive: 1 play, 26 yards, 0:06.**

**Top passers**

- KC – Patrick Mahomes – 36/41, 336 yards, 2 TD
- HOU – Davis Mills – 12/24, 121 yards, 2 TD

**Top rushers**

- KC – Isiah Pacheco – 15 rushes, 86 yards
- HOU – Royce Freeman – 11 rushes, 51 yards

**Top receivers**

- KC – Travis Kelce – 10 receptions, 105 yards
- HOU – Chris Moore – 4 receptions, 42 yards

A fumble lost by David Mills in overtime led to the game winning touchdown by the Chiefs.

==== Week 16: at Tennessee Titans ====
Week 16: Houston Texans at Tennessee Titans – Game summary

Quarter	1	2	3	4	Total
**Texans**	7	3	0	9	**19**
Titans	7	0	7	0	**14**

at Nissan Stadium, Nashville, Tennessee

- Date: December 24
- Game time: 1:00 p.m. CST
- Game weather: Clear, 20 °F (−7 °C)
- Game attendance: 66,634
- Referee: Shawn Smith
- TV announcers (CBS): Andrew Catalon, James Lofton and Amanda Renner
- Recap, Game Book

Game information

**First quarter**

- TEN – Derrick Henry 48-yard run (Randy Bullock kick), 8:48. Titans 7–0. **Drive: 5 plays, 60 yards, 3:09.**
- HOU – Rex Burkhead 0-yard fumble return (Kaʻimi Fairbairn kick), 2:34. Tied 7–7.

**Second quarter**

- HOU – Kaʻimi Fairbairn 25-yard field goal, 6:50. Texans 10–7. **Drive: 13 plays, 52 yards, 8:10.**

**Third quarter**

- TEN – Malik Willis 14-yard run (Randy Bullock kick), 8:15. Titans 14–10. **Drive: 6 plays, 52 yards, 3:34.**

**Fourth quarter**

- HOU – Kaʻimi Fairbairn 22-yard field goal, 7:25. Titans 14–13. **Drive: 10 plays, 54 yards, 6:19.**
- HOU – Brandin Cooks 6-yard pass from Davis Mills (pass failed), 2:52. Texans 19–14. **Drive: 5 plays, 73 yards, 2:15.**

**Top passers**

- HOU – Davis Mills – 17/28, 178 yards, TD, INT
- TEN – Malik Willis – 14/23, 99 yards, 2 INT

**Top rushers**

- HOU – Royce Freeman – 16 rushes, 32 yards
- TEN – Derrick Henry – 23 rushes, 126 yards, TD

**Top receivers**

- HOU – Phillip Dorsett – 3 receptions, 45 yards
- TEN – Robert Woods – 4 receptions, 30 yards

Kickoff was originally scheduled for 12:00 p.m. CST, but was delayed an hour due to rolling blackouts in the Nashville area.

==== Week 17: vs. Jacksonville Jaguars ====
Week 17: Jacksonville Jaguars at Houston Texans – Game summary

Quarter	1	2	3	4	Total
**Jaguars**	7	14	7	3	**31**
Texans	0	0	3	0	**3**

at NRG Stadium, Houston, Texas

- Date: January 1
- Game time: 12:00 p.m. CST
- Game weather: None (retractable roof closed)
- Game attendance: 64,581
- Referee: Scott Novak
- TV announcers (CBS): Andrew Catalon, James Lofton and Amanda Renner
- Recap, Game Book

Game information

**First quarter**

- JAX – JaMycal Hasty 5-yard run (Riley Patterson kick), 8:24. Jaguars 7–0. **Drive: 8 plays, 45 yards, 3:06.**

**Second quarter**

- JAX – Travis Etienne 62-yard run (Riley Patterson kick), 12:21. Jaguars 14–0. **Drive: 1 play, 62 yards, 0:09.**
- JAX – Tyson Campbell 12-yard interception return (Riley Patterson kick), 11:35. Jaguars 21–0.

**Third quarter**

- JAX – Snoop Conner 3-yard run (Riley Patterson kick), 9:28. Jaguars 28–0. **Drive: 11 plays, 75 yards, 5:32.**
- HOU – Kaʻimi Fairbairn 56-yard field goal, 5:49. Jaguars 28–3. **Drive: 7 plays, 37 yards, 3:39.**

**Fourth quarter**

- JAX – Riley Patterson 53-yard field goal, 6:06. Jaguars 31–3. **Drive: 4 plays, 5 yards, 2:09.**

**Top passers**

- JAX – Trevor Lawrence – 17/21, 152 yards, INT
- HOU – Davis Mills – 22/40, 202 yards

**Top rushers**

- JAX – Travis Etienne – 9 rushes, 108 yards, TD
- HOU – Davis Mills – 4 rushes, 33 yards

**Top receivers**

- JAX – Marvin Jones – 6 receptions, 61 yards
- HOU – Brandin Cooks – 4 receptions, 39 yards

==== Week 18: at Indianapolis Colts ====
Week 18: Houston Texans at Indianapolis Colts – Game summary

Quarter	1	2	3	4	Total
**Texans**	10	7	7	8	**32**
Colts	7	0	14	10	**31**

at Lucas Oil Stadium, Indianapolis, Indiana

- Date: January 8
- Game time: 1:00 p.m. EST/12:00 p.m. CST
- Game weather: None (retractable roof closed)
- Game attendance: 63,655
- Referee: Jerome Boger
- TV announcers (CBS): Spero Dedes and Jay Feely
- Recap, Game Book

Game information

**First quarter**

- HOU – Brandin Cooks 11-yard pass from Davis Mills (Kaʻimi Fairbairn kick), 11:17. Texans 7–0. **Drive: 7 plays, 75 yards, 3:43.**
- HOU – Kaʻimi Fairbairn 37-yard field goal, 9:40. Texans 10–0. **Drive: 4 plays, −1 yards, 1:31.**
- IND – Michael Pittman Jr. 1-yard pass from Sam Ehlinger (Chase McLaughlin kick), 3:56. Texans 10–7. **Drive: 11 plays, 75 yards, 5:44.**

**Second quarter**

- HOU – Jonathan Greenard 39-yard interception return (Kaʻimi Fairbairn kick), 10:30. Texans 17–7.

**Third quarter**

- IND – Zack Moss 15-yard run (Chase McLaughlin kick), 6:40. Texans 17–14. **Drive: 5 plays, 49 yards, 2:48.**
- HOU – Jordan Akins 19-yard pass from Davis Mills (Kaʻimi Fairbairn kick), 3:51. Texans 24–14. **Drive: 5 plays, 75 yards, 2:49.**
- IND – Rodney McLeod 27-yard interception return (Chase McLaughlin kick), 0:52. Texans 24–21.

**Fourth quarter**

- IND – Mo Alie-Cox 4-yard pass from Sam Ehlinger (Chase McLaughlin kick), 10:30. Colts 28–24. **Drive: 7 plays, 58 yards, 4:30.**
- IND – Chase McLaughlin 54-yard field goal, 3:33. Colts 31–24. **Drive: 10 plays, 40 yards, 5:24.**
- HOU – Jordan Akins 28-yard pass from Davis Mills (Davis Mills pass to Jordan Akins), 0:50. Texans 32–31. **Drive: 14 plays, 83 yards, 2:43.**

**Top passers**

- HOU – Davis Mills – 22/38, 298 yards, 3 TD, 2 INT
- IND – Sam Ehlinger – 23/35, 209 yards, 2 TD, 2 INT

**Top rushers**

- HOU – Dare Ogunbowale – 11 rushes, 33 yards
- IND – Zack Moss – 18 rushes, 114 yards, TD

**Top receivers**

- HOU – Brandin Cooks – 5 receptions, 106 yards, TD
- IND – Deon Jackson – 6 receptions, 75 yards

With the win, combined with a loss from the Chicago Bears, the Texans lost their first overall pick in the 2023 NFL draft.

=== Standings ===
==== Division ====
AFC South
	W	L	T	PCT	DIV	CONF	PF	PA	STK
^{(4)} Jacksonville Jaguars	9	8	0	.529	4–2	8–4	404	350	W5
Tennessee Titans	7	10	0	.412	3–3	5–7	298	359	L7
Indianapolis Colts	4	12	1	.265	1–4–1	4–7–1	289	427	L7
Houston Texans	3	13	1	.206	3–2–1	3–8–1	289	420	W1

==== Conference ====
AFC
#	Team	Division	W	L	T	PCT	DIV	CONF	SOS	SOV	STK
**Division leaders**
1	Kansas City Chiefs	West	14	3	0	.824	6–0	9–3	.453	.422	W5
2	Buffalo Bills	East	13	3	0	.813	4–2	9–2	.489	.471	W7
3	Cincinnati Bengals	North	12	4	0	.750	3–3	8–3	.507	.490	W8
4	Jacksonville Jaguars	South	9	8	0	.529	4–2	8–4	.467	.438	W5
**Wild cards**
5 (Note: LA Chargers claimed the No. 5 seed over Baltimore based on conference record (7–5 vs. 6–6).)	Los Angeles Chargers	West	10	7	0	.588	2–4	7–5	.443	.341	L1
6	Baltimore Ravens	North	10	7	0	.588	3–3	6–6	.509	.456	L2
7 (Note: Miami finished ahead of Pittsburgh based on head-to-head victory, claiming the 7th and final playoff spot.)	Miami Dolphins	East	9	8	0	.529	3–3	7–5	.537	.457	W1
**Did not qualify for the postseason**
8	Pittsburgh Steelers	North	9	8	0	.529	3–3	5–7	.519	.451	W4
9	New England Patriots	East	8	9	0	.471	3–3	6–6	.502	.415	L1
10 (Note: NY Jets and Tennessee finished ahead of Cleveland based on conference record (5–7 vs. 4–8).) (Note: NY Jets finished ahead of Tennessee based on common record (3–3 vs. 2–4 against: Buffalo, Cincinnati, Denver, Green Bay, Jacksonville).)	New York Jets	East	7	10	0	.412	2–4	5–7	.538	.458	L6
11	Tennessee Titans	South	7	10	0	.412	3–3	5–7	.509	.336	L7
12	Cleveland Browns	North	7	10	0	.412	3–3	4–8	.524	.492	L1
13	Las Vegas Raiders	West	6	11	0	.353	3–3	5–7	.474	.397	L3
14	Denver Broncos	West	5	12	0	.294	1–5	3–9	.481	.465	W1
15	Indianapolis Colts	South	4	12	1	.265	1–4–1	4–7–1	.512	.500	L7
16	Houston Texans	South	3	13	1	.206	3–2–1	3–8–1	.481	.402	W1
**Tiebreakers** (Note: When breaking ties for three or more teams under the NFL's rules, they are first broken within divisions, then comparing only the highest ranked remaining team from each division.)

== Statistics ==
=== Team ===
Category	Total yards	Yards per game	NFL rank (out of 32)
Passing offense	3,344	196.7	25th
Rushing offense	1,476	86.8	31st
Total offense	4,820	283.5	31st
Passing defense	3,558	209.3	10th
Rushing defense	2,894	170.2	32nd
Total defense	6,452	379.5	30th

=== Individual ===
Category	Player	Total
Offense
Passing yards	Davis Mills	3,118
Passing touchdowns	Davis Mills	17
Rushing yards	Dameon Pierce	939
Rushing touchdowns	Dameon Pierce	4
Receiving yards	Brandin Cooks	699
Receiving touchdowns	Jordan Akins	5
Defense
Tackles (Solo)	Jalen Pitre	99
Sacks	Jerry Hughes	9
Interceptions	Jalen Pitre	5
