= Eric Murray (American football) =

American football player (born 1994)

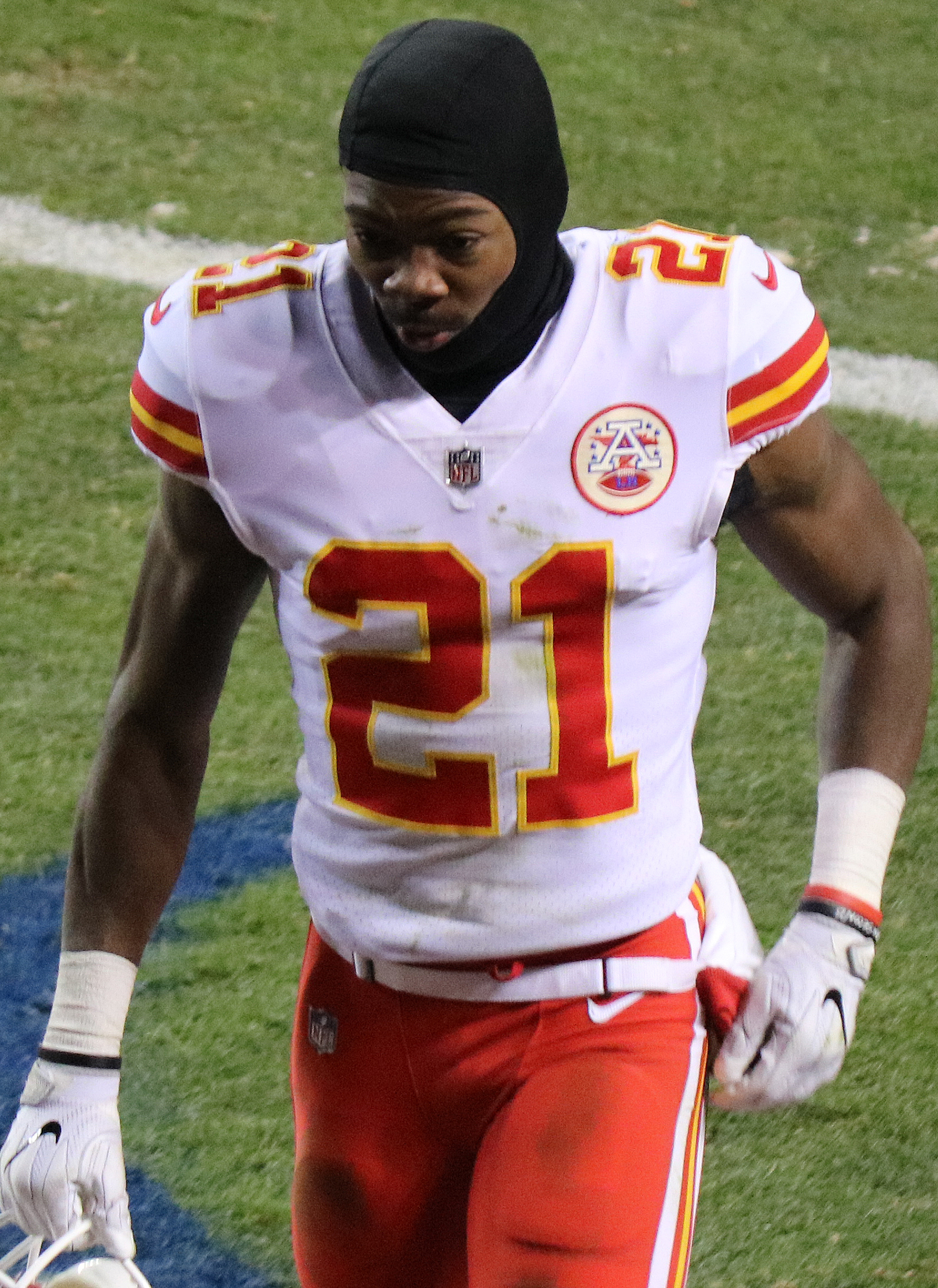
- Murray with the Kansas City Chiefs in 2017

No. 29 – Jacksonville Jaguars
- Position: Safety
- Roster status: Injured reserve

Personal information
- Born: January 7, 1994 (age 32); Milwaukee, Wisconsin, U.S.
- Listed height: 5 ft 11 in (1.80 m)
- Listed weight: 199 lb (90 kg)

Career information
- High school: Riverside University (Milwaukee)
- College: Minnesota (2012–2015)
- NFL draft: 2016: 4th round, 106th overall pick

Career history
- Kansas City Chiefs (2016–2018); Cleveland Browns (2019); Houston Texans (2020–2024); Jacksonville Jaguars (2025–present)

Awards and highlights
- Second-team All-Big Ten (2014)

Career NFL statistics as of 2025
- Total tackles: 440
- Sacks: 6.0
- Forced fumbles: 3
- Fumble recoveries: 1
- Pass deflections: 30
- Interceptions: 4
- Stats at Pro Football Reference

Eric Murray (born January 7, 1994) is an American professional football safety for the Jacksonville Jaguars of the National Football League (NFL). He played college football for the Minnesota Golden Gophers, and was selected by the Kansas City Chiefs in the fourth round of the 2016 NFL draft. He has also played for the Cleveland Browns and Houston Texans.

== Professional career ==
=== Pre-draft ===
He attended the NFL Scouting Combine and performed all of the combine and positional drills. The majority of NFL draft analysts projected Murray would be selected in the third or fourth round in the 2016 NFL draft. NFL draft analyst Matt Miller of Bleacher Report ranked him as the 14th best cornerback prospect in the draft. Sam Monson of Pro Football Focus ranked Murray 19th among all cornerbacks in the draft.

External videos
- Eric Murray's NFL Combine workout

Pre-draft measurables
Height	Weight	Arm length	Hand span	Wingspan	40-yard dash	10-yard split	20-yard split	20-yard shuttle	Three-cone drill	Vertical jump	Broad jump	Bench press
5 ft 10 5/8 in (1.79 m)	199 lb (90 kg)	31 3/4 in (0.81 m)	9 in (0.23 m)	6 ft 5 in (1.96 m)	4.49 s	1.54 s	2.58 s	4.05 s	7.08 s	39.5 in (1.00 m)	10 ft 4 in (3.15 m)	15 reps
All values from NFL Combine

=== Kansas City Chiefs ===
==== 2016 ====
The Kansas City Chiefs selected Murray in the fourth round (106th overall) of the 2016 NFL draft. The Chiefs acquired the fourth round selection used to draft Murray in a trade with the Tampa Bay Buccaneers, where they also received a 2016 third round selection (74th overall) in exchange for a 2016 second round selection (59th overall) the Buccaneers used to select Florida State kicker Roberto Aguayo. The Chiefs used the 2016 second round selection on their first cornerback they drafted, KeiVarae Russell. He was the 17th cornerback drafted in 2016.

External videos
- Chiefs select Eric Murray 106th overall

On May 17, 2016, the Kansas City Chiefs signed Murray to a four–year, $2.96 million contract that includes a signing bonus of $599,803.

Entering organized team activities, Murray was expected to compete for a job as the starting cornerback against Steven Nelson, Marcus Cooper, Phillip Gaines, KeiVarae Russell, and D. J. White after it was left vacant by the departure of Sean Smith. During rookie minicamp, defensive coordinator Bob Sutton had Murray move to safety. He decided to have Murray transition fully to safety following the retirement of Husain Abdullah, departure of Tyvon Branch in free agency, and an injury to Eric Berry. Throughout training camp, he competed for the job at safety against Jamell Fleming, Stevie Brown, Daniel Sorensen, Ron Parker, Akeem Davis, and Shakiel Randolph. Head coach Andy Reid named him a backup and listed him as the No. 2 free safety to begin the season, behind starters Ron Parker and Eric Berry.

On September 11, 2016, Murray made his professional regular season debut in the Kansas City Chiefs' home-opener against the San Diego Chargers and had one solo tackle during their 33–27 overtime victory. In Week 3, he had the first fumble recovery of his career after teammate Phillip Gaines forced a fumble by running back Bilal Powell during a 24–3 win against the New York Jets. On December 25, 2016, Murray set a season-high with two solo tackles in the Chiefs' 33–10 victory against the Denver Broncos. He finished his rookie season with eight solo tackles and a fumble recovery in 16 games and zero starts. Throughout the season, he was limited mostly to special teams and had only 67 snaps on defense. He tied with Daniel Sorensen for the team lead with 367 special teams snaps that accounted for 82% of them.

The Kansas City Chiefs finished the 2016 NFL season first in the American Football Conference (AFC) West with a 12–4 record, clinching a first round bye and home field advantage. On January 15, 2017, Murray appeared in his first career playoff game and made one solo tackle during their 18–16 loss to the Pittsburgh Steelers in the AFC Divisional Round.

==== 2017 ====
During organized team activities and training camp, Murray competed for a job as a backup safety against Daniel Sorensen, Leon McQuay III, Marqueston Huff, and Jordan Stern. He began the season as the backup free safety with Eric Berry and Ron Parker remaining as the starting safeties.

On September 7, 2017, starting strong safety Eric Berry tore his Achilles tendon in the Chiefs' season-opening 42–27 victory at the New England Patriots and was placed on injured reserve. Murray subsequently received increased snaps on defense. In Week 2, he set a season-high with six solo tackles and made two pass deflections during a 27–20 victory against the Philadelphia Eagles. In Week 5, he earned his first career start and recorded two combined tackles during a 42–24 victory at the Texans. On November 26, 2017, Murray made one solo tackle before exiting during the second quarter of the Chiefs' 16-10 loss to the Buffalo Bills after sustaining an injury. He remained inactive for the next two games (Weeks 13–14) due to a high-ankle sprain and was replaced by Darrelle Revis during his absence. In Week 15, Murray made three solo tackles and made his first career sack on quarterback Philip Rivers for a nine–yard loss during a 30–23 victory against the Los Angeles Chargers. He finished the 2017 season with 36 combined tackles (31 solo), five pass deflections, and a sack in 14 games and two starts.

The Kansas City Chiefs finished the 2017 NFL season a top the AFC West with a 10–6 record and received a playoff berth. On January 6, 2018, Murray appeared in the AFC Wild-Card Game, but had one solo tackle after receiving limited snaps on defense as the Chiefs lost 22–21 against the Tennessee Titans.

==== 2018 ====
He entered training camp expecting to compete against Daniel Sorensen and rookie Armani Watts to be a starting safety due to Eric Berry still in the process of recovering from his torn Achilles and also the release of Ron Parker. Armani Watts injured his ankle and was unable to perform for the majority of training camp. On September 2, 2018, the Chiefs officially placed Daniel Sorensen on injured reserve after he suffered a knee injury during training camp and subsequently signed free agent Ron Parker. Head coach Andy Reid named Murray and Ron Parker the starting safeties to begin the season.

On September 9, 2018, Murray started in the Kansas City Chiefs' season-opener at the Los Angeles Chargers and set a season-high with nine combined tackles (four solo) during a 38–28 victory. On October 1, 2018, Murray made six combined tackles (five solo), one pass deflection, and had his first career interception off a pass attempt by Case Keenum to tight end Jeff Heuerman during a 27–23 victory against the Denver Broncos. In Week 5, he exited in the first quarter of a 30–14 win against the Jacksonville Jaguars after injuring his ankle. The following week, he was inactive as the Chiefs lost 40–43 at the New England Patriots in Week 6. He was demoted to a backup after Eric Berry returned from injury after Week 13 and regained his role as the starting strong safety for the last four games of the season (Weeks 14–17). He finished the season with a total of 55 combined tackles (43 solo), two pass deflections, and one interception in 15 games and nine starts.

The Kansas City Chiefs finished the 2018 NFL season with a 12–4 record and earned a first-round bye. On January 12, 2019, Murray had seven combined tackles (four solo) during a 31–13 victory against the Indianapolis Colts in the Divisional Round. On January 20, 2019, Murray appeared in the AFC Championship Game and recorded three solo tackles as the Chiefs lost in overtime 31–37 against the New England Patriots.

=== Cleveland Browns ===
On April 1, 2019, the Kansas City Chiefs traded Murray to the Cleveland Browns in exchange for defensive end Emmanuel Ogbah. The trade was initiated after Emmanuel Ogbah requested a trade from the Browns as he did not want to remain a backup when entering the final year of his rookie contract. The Cleveland Browns were interested in receiving Murray in return as they were lacking depth at the safety position after trading their starter Jabrill Peppers to the New York Giants a few weeks prior.

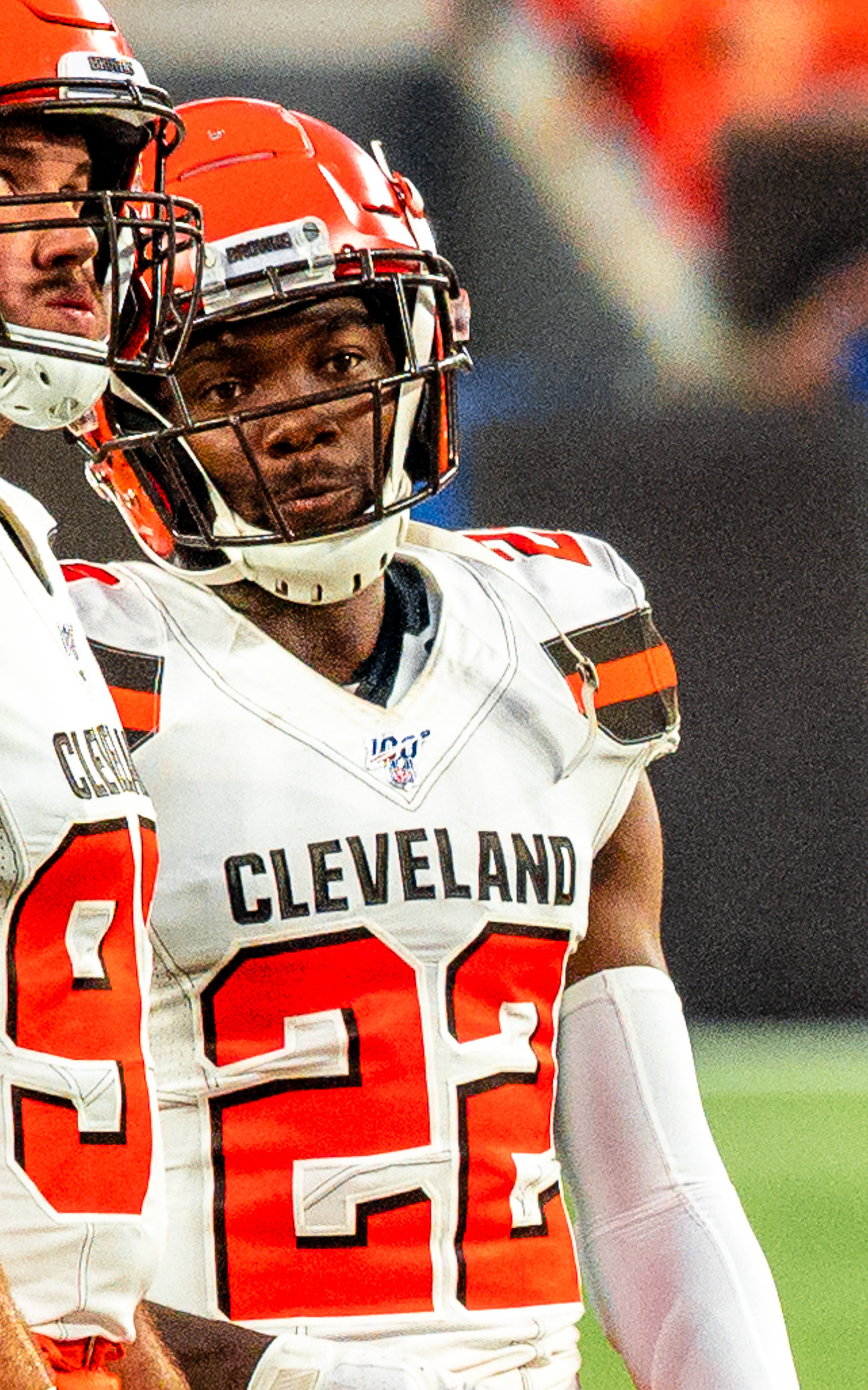
Murray with the Browns in 2019

Throughout training camp, he competed to be the starting strong safety against Morgan Burnett and Jermaine Whitehead under defensive coordinator Steve Wilks. Head coach Freddie Kitchens named him a backup to begin the season, behind starting safeties Morgan Burnett and Damarious Randall. In Week 3, he set a season-high with five combined tackles (three solo) and made one pass deflection during a 13–20 loss against the Los Angeles Rams. On October 27, 2019, Murray had five combined tackles (three solo) and one sack as the Browns lost 13–27 at the New England Patriots. On October 31, 2019, Murray suffered a knee injury during practice and was required to undergo surgery. He subsequently remained inactive for the next seven games (Weeks 9–15). He finished the 2019 NFL season with 21 combined tackles (15 solo), one pass deflection, and one sack in nine games and three starts.

=== Houston Texans ===
==== 2020 ====
On April 1, 2020, the Houston Texans signed Murray to a three–year, $18.00 million contract that includes $10.75 million guaranteed and a signing bonus of $4.50 million. The contract has a maximum value of $20.25 million with incentives.

He entered training camp slated as the starting strong safety under defensive coordinator Anthony Weaver following the departure of Tashaun Gipson. Head coach Bill O'Brien named him the starting strong safety to begin the season and paired him with free safety Justin Reid.

On October 5, 2020, the Houston Texans fired head coach Bill O'Brien after they began the 2020 NFL season 0–4. Defensive coordinator Romeo Crennel was appointed to interim head coach for the remainder of the season. On December 13, 2020, Murray led the team with 11 combined tackles (10 solo) and had set a career-high with two sacks in Mitchell Trubisky during a 36–7 loss at the Chicago Bears. On December 27, 2020, the Texans placed Murray was on the reserve/COVID-19. On January 13, 2021, the Texans activated Murray from COVID-19/reserve list and added him back to their active roster after he was inactive for two games (Weeks 16–17). He finished the season with 71 combined tackles (47 solo), two pass deflections, and two sacks in 14 games and 14 starts.

==== 2021 ====
He returned to training camp slated as the de facto starting strong safety under new defensive coordinator Lovie Smith. Head coach David Culley retained Murray and Justin Reid as the starting safeties to begin the season.

Prior to Week 4, head coach David Culley demoted Murray to backup safety and he was supplanted as the starting strong safety by Lonnie Johnson Jr. Following five games, Murray returned to his starting role and Lonnie Johnson Jr. was moved to cornerback. On November 7, 2021, Murray returned as the starting strong safety and had eight combined tackles (five solo), made a pass deflection, and intercepted a pass by Jacoby Brissett to wide receiver Jaylen Waddle during a 9–17 loss at the Miami Dolphins. The following game, he set a new season-high with 11 combined tackles (six solo) and had one pass deflection during a 22–13 victory at the Tennessee Titans in Week 11. On December 23, 2021, the Texans placed him on the COVID-19/reserve list and he remained inactive for the Texans' 41–29 win against the Los Angeles Chargers in Week 15. On December 30, 2021, he was elevated from the COVID-19/reserve list and added back to their active roster. He finished the season with a career-high 76 combined tackles (48 solo), four pass deflections, and one interception in 15 games and 15 starts.

==== 2022 ====
On March 16, 2022, the Houston Texans signed Murray to a two–year, $8.00 million contract extension that includes $3.75 million guaranteed upon signing and an initial signing bonus of $1.25 million. Including incentives, the contract has a maximum value of $10 million.

During the off-season, the Texans fired head coach David Culley and promoted defensive coordinator Lovie Smith to head coach. Starting free safety Justin Reid departed in free agency and the Texans selected Jalen Pitre in the second round of the 2022 NFL draft. Murray entered training camp as a candidate to be a starting safety, but had to compete against Jalen Pitre, Jonathan Owens, M. J. Stewart, and Terrence Brooks. Head coach Lovie Smith named him a backup safety to begin the season, behind starting duo Jalen Pitre and Jonathan Owens. In Week 8, Murray set a season-high with seven combined tackles (six solo) during 10–17 loss against the Tennessee Titans. He finished the season with only 27 combined tackles (18 solo) in 16 games and didn't receive a single start.

==== 2023 ====
The Houston Texans fired head coach Lovie Smith after finishing the 2022 NFL season with a 3–13 and hired DeMeco Ryans to be their new head coach. Throughout training camp, Murray competed against Jimmie Ward and M. J. Stewart to be the starting strong safety under defensive coordinator Matt Burke after the job was left vacant following the departure of Jonathan Owens in free agency. Head coach DeMeco Ryans named Jimmie Ward and Jalen Pitre as the starting safeties to begin the season with Murray listed as a backup. Murray started in Week 1 after Jimmie Ward was inactive for the first two games due to a hip injury. In Week 3, he set a season-high with five combined tackles (three solo) during a 37–17 win at the Jacksonville Jaguars. On October 15, 2023, Murray started at nickelback during the Texans' 20–13 win against the New Orleans Saints in Week 6, buy exited in the first quarter after walking gingerly off the field due to ab injury. On October 18, 2023, the Houston Texans officially was placed on him on injured reserve due to a knee injury. He remained inactive for the remainder of the season and missed the last 11 games (Weeks 8–18). He was limited to 13 combined tackles (eight solo) in only six games and four starts.

==== 2024 ====
On March 12, 2024, the Houston Texans signed Murray to a one–year, $1.75 million contract extension that includes $425,000 guaranteed and a signing bonus of $300,000. Throughout training camp, Murray competed against Jimmie Ward and 2024 third round pick (78th overall) Calen Bullock to be a starting safety. He also competed to be the starting nickelback. Defensive coordinator Matt Burke elected to move starting strong safety Jalen Pitre into the slot in nickel situations with Murray replacing Pitre at his normal safety position. Head coach DeMeco Ryans named Murray a backup safety to begin the season behind starters Jalen Pitre and Jimmie Ward. He was named the primary nickelback in situations that necessitated a fifth defensive back.

In Week 6, Murray had seven combined tackles (four solo), made one pass deflection, and had his lone interception of the season on a pass by Drake Maye to running back Antonio Gibson during a 41–21 win at the New England Patriots. On October 27, 2024, he had seven combined tackles (five solo) and set a new career-high with three pass deflections as the Texans defeated the Indianapolis Colts 23–20. In Week 16, Murray set a season-high with ten combined tackles (eight solo) during a 19–27 loss at the Kansas City Chiefs. He finished the season with 75 combined tackles (50 solo), set a career-high with ten pass deflections, had one sack, and made one interception in 17 games and 14 starts. He shared starts with rookie Calen Bullock throughout the season due to Jimmie Ward missing ten games throughout the season due to injuries. He received an overall grade of 61.7 from Pro Football Focus, which ranked 101st amongst 171 qualifying safeties in 2024.

=== Jacksonville Jaguars ===
On March 12, 2025, the Jacksonville Jaguars signed Murray to a three–year, $19.5 million contract that includes $12 million guaranteed, $10 million guaranteed upon signing, and an initial signing bonus of $5 million. He was placed on injured reserve on October 31, due to a neck injury. Murray was activated on December 6, ahead of the team's Week 14 matchup against the Indianapolis Colts.

Murray was placed on season-ending injured reserve after suffering an elbow injury on the opening play in the 42–7 win against the Indianapolis Colts. He would finished the 2026 season with only 15 total tackles (10 solo, 5 assisted).

== NFL career statistics ==
Legend
	Led the league
**Bold**	Career high

Regular season statistics
Year	Team	Games		Tackles					Interceptions						Fumbles	
Year	Team	GP	GS	Comb	Total	Ast	Sck	TFL	PD	Int	Yds	Avg	Lng	TD	FF	FR
2016	KC	16	0	9	9	0	0.0	0	0	0	0	0.0	0	0	0	**1**
2017	KC	14	2	36	31	5	1.0	2	5	0	0	0.0	0	0	0	0
2018	KC	15	9	55	43	12	0.0	1	2	**1**	0	0.0	0	0	0	0
2019	CLE	9	4	24	15	9	1.0	**3**	1	0	0	0.0	0	0	0	0
2020	HOU	14	14	71	47	24	**2.0**	2	2	0	0	0.0	0	0	**1**	0
2021	HOU	16	11	**76**	48	**28**	0.0	0	4	**1**	0	0.0	0	0	0	0
2022	HOU	**17**	0	27	18	9	0.0	0	0	0	0	0.0	0	0	0	0
2023	HOU	6	4	13	8	5	0.0	0	0	0	0	0.0	0	0	**1**	0
2024	HOU	**17**	14	75	**50**	25	1.0	2	**10**	**1**	0	0.0	0	0	0	0
2025	JAX	12	12	54	32	22	1.0	2	6	**1**	**12**	**12.0**	**12**	0	**1**	0
2026	JAX	6	5	15	10	5	0.0	0	0	0	0	0.0	0	0	0	0
Career		142	75	455	311	144	6.0	12	30	4	12	3.0	12	0	3	1
Source: NFL.com

Postseason statistics
Year	Team	Games		Tackles					Interceptions						Fumbles	
Year	Team	GP	GS	Comb	Total	Ast	Sck	TFL	PD	Int	Yds	Avg	Lng	TD	FF	FR
2016	KC	1	0	1	1	0	0.0	0	0	0	0	0.0	0	0	0	0
2017	KC	1	0	1	1	0	0.0	0	0	0	0	0.0	0	0	0	0
2018	KC	2	0	10	7	**3**	0.0	0	0	0	0	0.0	0	0	0	0
2024	HOU	2	2	**11**	**8**	**3**	0.0	0	**2**	**1**	**38**	**38.0**	**38**	**1**	0	0
2025	JAX	1	1	7	4	**3**	0.0	0	0	0	0	0.0	0	0	0	0
Career		7	3	30	21	9	0.0	0	2	1	38	38.0	38	1	0	0
Source: pro-football-referencecom
