= Dameon Pierce =

American football player (born 2000)

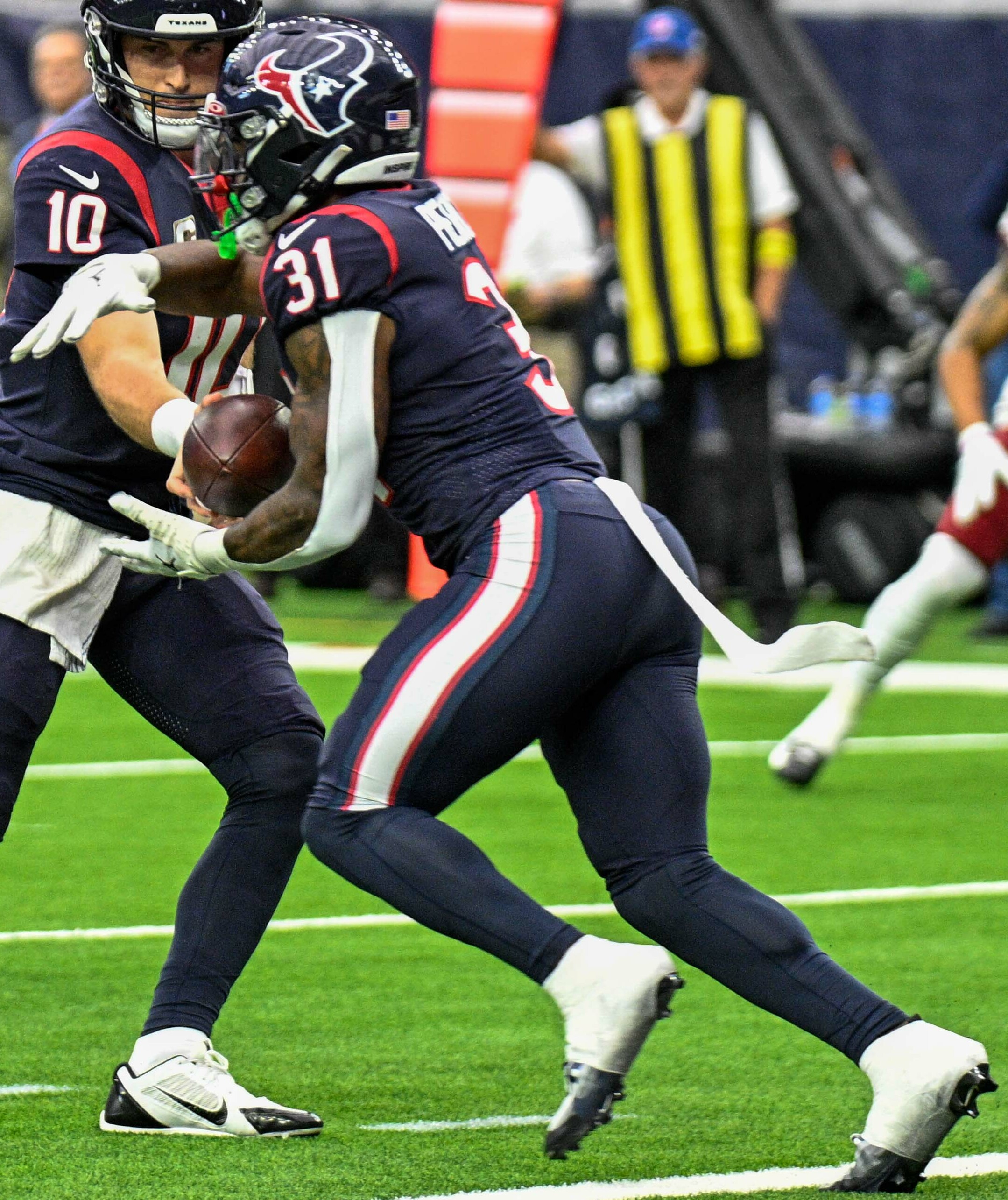
- Pierce with the Houston Texans in 2022

Profile
- Position: Running back

Personal information
- Born: February 19, 2000 (age 26); Bainbridge, Georgia, U.S.
- Listed height: 5 ft 10 in (1.78 m)
- Listed weight: 218 lb (99 kg)

Career information
- High school: Bainbridge
- College: Florida (2018–2021)
- NFL draft: 2022: 4th round, 107th overall pick

Career history
- Houston Texans (2022–2025); Kansas City Chiefs (2025); Philadelphia Eagles (2026)

Career NFL statistics as of Week 7, 2026
- Rushing yards: 1,780
- Rushing average: 3.9
- Rushing touchdowns: 10
- Receptions: 52
- Receiving yards: 282
- Receiving touchdowns: 1
- Return yards: 717
- Return touchdowns: 1
- Stats at Pro Football Reference

Dameon Pierce (born February 19, 2000) is an American professional football running back. He played college football for the Florida Gators and was selected by the Houston Texans in the fourth round of the 2022 NFL draft . He has also played for the Philadelphia Eagles and the Kansas City Chiefs of the National Football League.

== Early life ==
Pierce grew up in Bainbridge, Georgia and attended Bainbridge High School. As a senior, he rushed for 2,123 yards and 32 touchdowns. Pierce finished his high school career with 6,779 rushing yards and 92 total touchdowns scored. He was rated a four-star recruit and committed to play college football at Florida over offers from Alabama, Florida State, Miami (FL), Georgia, South Carolina, and Auburn.

== College career ==
Pierce rushed for 424 yards and two touchdowns on 69 carries in his freshman season. As a sophomore, he rushed 305 yards and four touchdowns. Pierce also played on special teams during his first two seasons. As a junior, he led the Gators with 503 rushing yards and four touchdowns and caught 17 passes for 156 yards and one touchdown. Pierce gained 574 yards and scored 13 touchdowns on 100 carries and also caught 19 passes for 216 yards and three touchdowns in his senior season.

=== College statistics ===
Year	G	Rushing				Receiving			
Year	G	Att	Yds	Avg	TD	Rec	Yds	Avg	TD
2018	11	69	424	6.1	2	5	20	4.0	1
2019	12	54	305	5.6	4	4	30	7.5	0
2020	12	106	503	4.7	4	17	156	9.2	1
2021	13	100	574	5.7	13	19	216	11.4	3
Career	48	329	1,806	5.5	23	45	422	9.4	5

== Professional career ==
Pre-draft measurables
Height	Weight	Arm length	Hand span	Wingspan	40-yard dash	10-yard split	20-yard split	20-yard shuttle	Three-cone drill	Vertical jump	Broad jump	Bench press
5 ft 9 5/8 in (1.77 m)	218 lb (99 kg)	30 3/4 in (0.78 m)	9 3/8 in (0.24 m)	6 ft 1 5/8 in (1.87 m)	4.59 s	1.51 s	2.68 s	4.46 s	7.53 s	34.5 in (0.88 m)	9 ft 11 in (3.02 m)	21 reps
All values from NFL Combine/Pro Day

=== Houston Texans ===
==== 2022 ====
Pierce was selected by the Houston Texans with the 107th overall pick in the fourth round of the 2022 NFL draft, using one of the selections acquired in the Deshaun Watson trade. After final roster cuts, Pierce was named the first-string running back for the 2022 season.

Pierce made his NFL debut in Week 1 against the Indianapolis Colts. He had 11 carries for 33 rushing yards in the 20–20 tie. In Week 3, against the Chicago Bears, he scored his first professional touchdown on a one-yard rush. The following week, against the Los Angeles Chargers, Pierce broke out with 14 carries for 131 yards and one touchdown, which was a 75-yard rush. In Week 9, against the Philadelphia Eagles, he had 27 carries for 139 rushing yards in the 29–17 loss. His season was cut short by an ankle injury in the fourth quarter of week 13 against the Dallas Cowboys. He finished his rookie season with 939 rushing yards and four touchdowns, along with 30 catches for 165 yards and one touchdown through 13 games and starts.

==== 2023 ====
Due to struggles in 2023, Pierce lost the first-string running back job to Devin Singletary. On December 24, 2023, Pierce returned a kickoff for a 98-yard touchdown against the Cleveland Browns in the 36–22 loss. Pierce finished the season with only 416 rushing yards averaging 2.8 yards per carry, along with only two touchdowns, both down from his rookie season. Pierce also had 13 catches for 101 yards, and no touchdowns.

==== 2024 ====
Pierce made 11 appearances for the Texans during the 2024 season, but worked primarily as a backup to Joe Mixon. In 40 rushing attempts, he logged 293 yards and two touchdowns.

==== 2025 ====
Pierce began the 2025 season as Houston's third-string running back behind Woody Marks and Nick Chubb. In four appearances for the team, he recorded 26 rushing yards on 10 attempts. Pierce was waived by the Texans on November 20, 2025.

=== Kansas City Chiefs ===
On November 23, 2025, the Kansas City Chiefs signed Pierce to their practice squad. He was promoted to the active roster on December 20.

=== Philadelphia Eagles ===
==== 2026 ====
On March 19, 2026, Pierce signed to a one-year, $1.29 million contract with the Philadelphia Eagles. On August 30, he was released by Philadelphia as a part of final roster cuts; he was re-signed to the practice squad the next day. On October 7, Pierce was signed to the active roster.

As a part of the active roster, in Week 6 against the Carolina Panthers, Pierce scored a two-yard rushing touchdown in the 25–14 loss. He then scored another one the next week against the Dallas Cowboys, which he scored a 5-yard rushing touchdown in the 38–21 loss. Pierce was later put on injured reserve on October 28 due to an undisclosed injury. He was released on November 6.

== NFL career statistics ==
=== Regular season ===
Legend
	Led the League
**Bold**	Career High

Year	Team	Games		Rushing					Receiving					Kick returns					Fumbles	
Year	Team	GP	GS	Att	Yds	Avg	Lng	TD	Rec	Yds	Avg	Lng	TD	Ret	Yds	Avg	Lng	TD	Fum	Lost
2022	HOU	13	**13**	**220**	**939**	4.3	75T	**4**	**30**	**165**	5.5	16	**1**	0	0	0.0	0	0	**4**	**2**
2023	HOU	**14**	7	145	416	2.9	22	2	13	101	**7.8**	**27**	0	7	225	32.1	**98T**	**1**	0	0
2024	HOU	11	0	40	293	**7.3**	**92**	2	2	2	1.0	1	0	**9**	**339**	**37.7**	80	0	1	0
2025	HOU	4	0	10	26	2.6	10	0	0	0	0.0	0	0	4	92	23.0	26	0	0	0
2025	KC	1	0	4	10	2.5	4	0	0	0	0.0	0	0	0	0	0.0	0	0	0	0
Career		43	20	419	1,684	4.0	92	8	45	268	6.0	27	1	20	656	32.8	98T	1	5	2

=== Postseason ===
Year	Team	Games		Rushing					Receiving					Kick returns					Fumbles	
Year	Team	GP	GS	Att	Yds	Avg	Lng	TD	Rec	Yds	Avg	Lng	TD	Ret	Yds	Avg	Lng	TD	Fum	Lost
2023	HOU	**2**	0	3	0	0.0	1	0	0	0	0.0	0	0	**1**	**17**	**17.0**	**17**	0	**1**	0
2024	HOU	**2**	0	**6**	**25**	**4.2**	**13**	0	0	0	0.0	0	0	**1**	11	11.0	11	0	0	0
Career		4	0	9	25	2.8	13	0	0	0	0.0	0	0	2	28	14.0	17	0	1	0
