= Teagan Quitoriano =

American football player (born 2000)

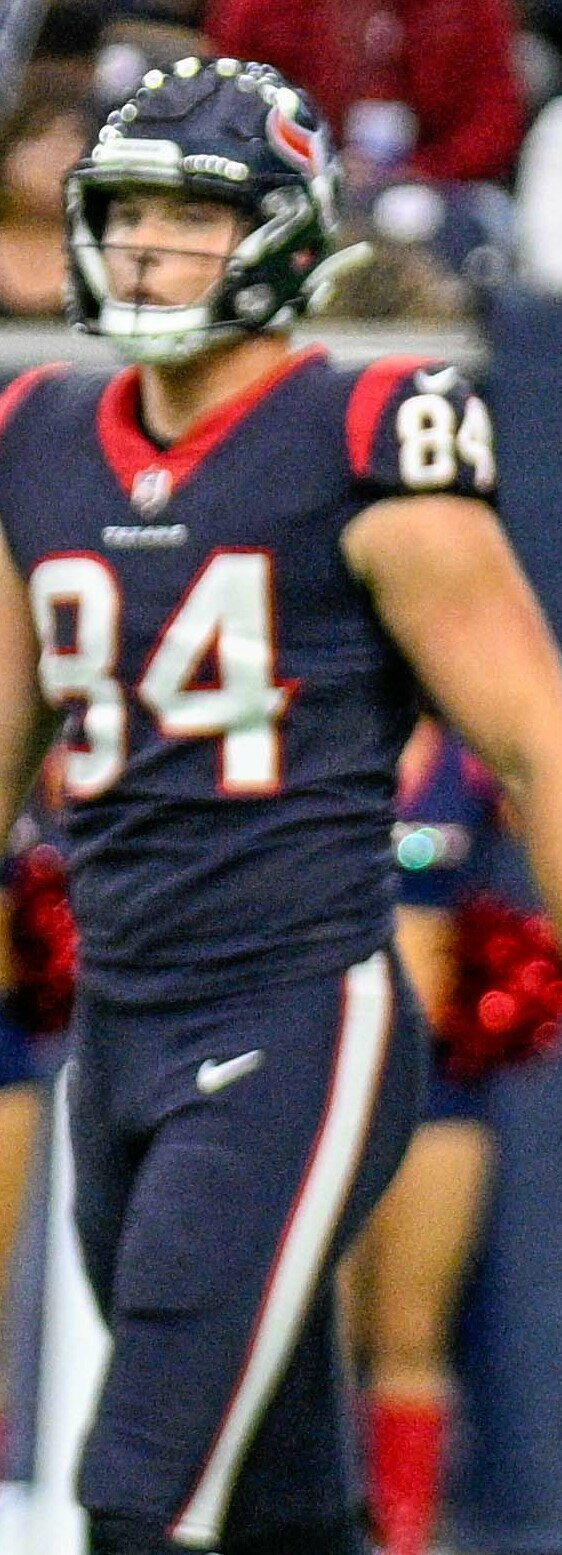
- Quitoriano with the Houston Texans in 2022

No. 47 – Arizona Cardinals
- Position: Tight end
- Roster status: Active

Personal information
- Born: March 15, 2000 (age 26); Salem, Oregon, U.S.
- Listed height: 6 ft 6 in (1.98 m)
- Listed weight: 259 lb (117 kg)

Career information
- High school: Sprague (Salem)
- College: Oregon State (2018–2021)
- NFL draft: 2022: 5th round, 170th overall pick

Career history
- Houston Texans (2022–2023); Chicago Bears (2024)*; Houston Texans (2024); Atlanta Falcons (2025); Arizona Cardinals (2026–present)
- * Offseason or practice squad member only

Career NFL statistics as of Week 5, 2026
- Receptions: 11
- Receiving yards: 161
- Receiving touchdowns: 4
- Stats at Pro Football Reference

Teagan Quitoriano (born March 15, 2000) is an American professional football tight end for the Arizona Cardinals of the National Football League (NFL). He played college football for the Oregon State Beavers.

== College career ==
Quitoriano played at Oregon State from 2018 to 2021.

=== Statistics ===
Oregon State
Year	G	Rec	Yds	Avg	TD
2018	3	2	13	6.5	0
2019	6	5	100	20.0	2
2020	6	14	185	13.2	1
2021	11	19	214	11.3	3
Career	26	40	512	12.8	6

== Professional career ==
Pre-draft measurables
Height	Weight	Arm length	Hand span	Wingspan	40-yard dash	10-yard split	20-yard split	20-yard shuttle	Three-cone drill	Vertical jump	Broad jump	Bench press
6 ft 5 1/2 in (1.97 m)	258 lb (117 kg)	33 3/4 in (0.86 m)	9 3/8 in (0.24 m)	6 ft 6 3/4 in (2.00 m)	4.94 s	1.76 s	2.86 s	4.50 s	7.33 s	32.0 in (0.81 m)	9 ft 9 in (2.97 m)	22 reps
All values from NFL Combine/Pro Day

=== Houston Texans (first stint) ===
Quitoriano was selected by the Houston Texans in the fifth round, 170th overall, of the 2022 NFL draft. He was placed on injured reserve on September 1, 2022. He was activated hours before the team's Week 8 Thursday Night Football game against the Philadelphia Eagles, and caught a two-yard touchdown pass for his first NFL reception. In Week 18, against the Indianapolis Colts, he had three receptions for 83 yards in the 32–31 victory. He finished his rookie season with seven receptions for 113 receiving yards and two receiving touchdowns in nine games, of which he started six.

On October 31, 2023, Quitoriano was placed on injured reserve.

On September 4, 2024, Quitoriano was waived by the Texans with an injury settlement.

=== Chicago Bears ===
On September 24, 2024, Quitoriano signed with the Chicago Bears' practice squad.

=== Houston Texans (second stint) ===
On October 9, 2024, the Houston Texans signed Quitoriano off of the Bears' practice squad.

=== Atlanta Falcons ===
On March 28, 2025, Quitoriano signed with the Atlanta Falcons. Quitoriano played in all 17 games for Atlanta (including one start), recording one tackle on special teams.

=== Arizona Cardinals ===
On March 18, 2026, Quitoriano signed a one-year contract with the Arizona Cardinals. Quitoriano was released by Arizona as a part of final roster cuts on August 30; he was re-signed to the team's practice squad the following day. On October 6, Quitoriano was promoted to the active roster. Five days later in Week 5 against the Detroit Lions, Quitoriano scored a two-yard touchdown on his first reception since 2023. He caught a second touchdown pass later in the same game.
