= Jonathan Owens =

American football player (born 1995)

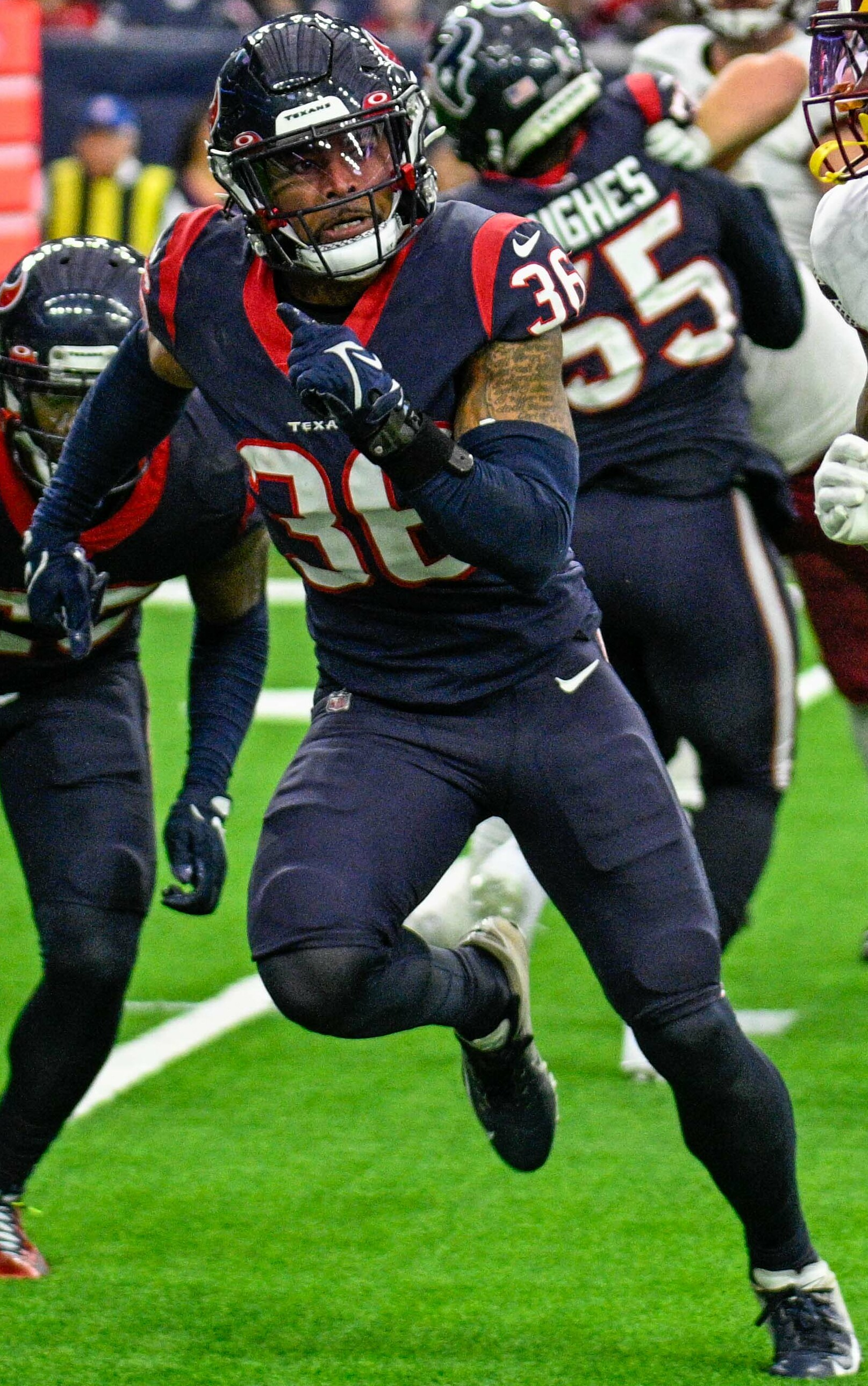
- Owens with the Houston Texans in 2022

No. 38 – Indianapolis Colts
- Position: Safety
- Roster status: Active

Personal information
- Born: July 22, 1995 (age 31); St. Louis, Missouri, U.S.
- Listed height: 5 ft 11 in (1.80 m)
- Listed weight: 204 lb (93 kg)

Career information
- High school: Christian Brothers (Town and Country, Missouri)
- College: Missouri Western (2013–2017)
- NFL draft: 2018: undrafted

Career history
- Arizona Cardinals (2018); Houston Texans (2019–2022); Green Bay Packers (2023); Chicago Bears (2024–2025); Indianapolis Colts (2026–present)

Career NFL statistics as of 2025
- Total tackles: 295
- Sacks: 2
- Forced fumbles: 2
- Fumble recoveries: 4
- Pass deflections: 10
- Interceptions: 2
- Stats at Pro Football Reference

Jonathan James Owens (born July 22, 1995) is an American professional football safety for the Indianapolis Colts of the National Football League (NFL). He played college football for the Missouri Western Griffons, and signed with the Arizona Cardinals as an undrafted free agent in 2018. He has also played for the Houston Texans, Green Bay Packers, and Chicago Bears. He is married to 11-time Olympic medal-winning American artistic gymnast Simone Biles.

== Early life ==
Owens played high school football at Christian Brothers College High School (CBC) under coach Scott Pingel after attending middle school at Loyola Academy of St. Louis. During his high school career, Owens won CBC Linebacker of the Year.

== College career ==
After his redshirt year during the 2013 season, Owens played defensive back for Missouri Western State University (MWSU). During his final season in 2017, Owens was MWSU Male Student-Athlete of the Year and earned second-team all-Mid-America Intercollegiate Athletics Association (MIAA) honors. Owens was on the MIAA Academic Honor Roll throughout the course of his college career. He majored in pre-physical therapy with the goal of becoming a doctor.

== Professional career ==
Pre-draft measurables
Height	Weight	Arm length	Hand span	Wingspan	40-yard dash	10-yard split	20-yard split	20-yard shuttle	Three-cone drill	Vertical jump	Broad jump	Bench press
5 ft 10 3/4 in (1.80 m)	210 lb (95 kg)	30 7/8 in (0.78 m)	9 7/8 in (0.25 m)	6 ft 4 5/8 in (1.95 m)	4.43 s	1.55 s	2.56 s	4.06 s	7.00 s	43.0 in (1.09 m)	11 ft 0 in (3.35 m)	18 reps
All values from Pro Day

=== Arizona Cardinals ===
Owens signed with the Arizona Cardinals as an undrafted free agent following the 2018 NFL draft. During the last week of organized team activities before the 2018 season, Owens was waived due to an injury, and spent the entire season on injured reserve.

On August 31, 2019, Owens was waived by the Cardinals.

=== Houston Texans ===
On September 30, 2019, Owens was signed to the practice squad of the Houston Texans. He was promoted to the active roster on November 21, but was waived two days later and re-signed to the team's practice squad. Owens signed a reserve/future contract with the Texans on January 13, 2020.

On September 5, 2020, Owens was waived by the Texans and was re-signed to the practice squad the following day. He was elevated to the active roster on October 10 and 17 for the team's Weeks 5 and 6 games against the Jacksonville Jaguars and Tennessee Titans, and reverted to the practice squad after each game. On December 12, Owens was signed to the active roster.

On August 31, 2021, Owens was waived by the Texans and re-signed to the practice squad. He was promoted to the active roster on December 4. On December 9, the Texans signed Owens to a two-year, $1.175 million deal that ran through the 2022 season. On December 26, Owens had his first career interception and first fumble recovery in the Texans' upset win over the Los Angeles Chargers. On January 3, 2022, Owens was placed on injured reserve after suffering a dislocated wrist in the team's week 16 loss against the San Francisco 49ers.

=== Green Bay Packers ===
On May 12, 2023, Owens signed with the Green Bay Packers. On Thanksgiving Day against the Detroit Lions, Owens scored his first career touchdown on a 27-yard fumble recovery as the Packers won 29–22.

=== Chicago Bears ===
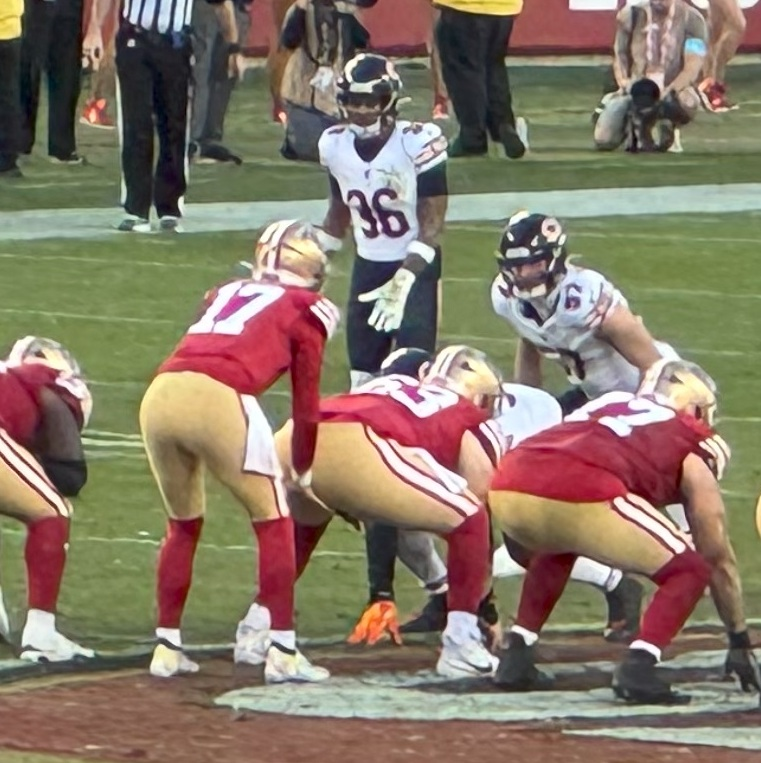
Owens (36) and Bears teammate Jack Sanborn line up against the San Francisco 49ers in 2024

On March 13, 2024, Owens signed a two-year contract with the Chicago Bears. In the season opener against the Tennessee Titans, Owens scored the Bears' first touchdown of the season on a returned blocked punt in a 24–17 victory. He recorded his second career interception and first since 2021 off the San Francisco 49ers' Brandon Allen in Week 14.

=== Indianapolis Colts ===
On March 17, 2026, Owens signed a one-year contract with the Indianapolis Colts.

== NFL career statistics ==
=== Regular season ===
Year	Team	Games		Tackles					Interceptions						Fumbles			
Year	Team	GP	GS	Cmb	Solo	Ast	Sck	Sfty	PD	Int	Yds	Avg	Lng	TD	FF	FR	Yds	TD
2018	ARI	0	0	Did not play due to injury														
2019	HOU	1	0	0	0	0	0.0	0	0	0	0	0.0	0	0	0	0	0	0
2020	HOU	6	0	0	0	0	0.0	0	0	0	0	0.0	0	0	0	0	0	0
2021	HOU	7	2	18	10	8	0.0	0	1	1	7	7.0	7	0	0	1	6	0
2022	HOU	17	17	125	84	41	1.0	0	4	0	0	0.0	0	0	0	0	0	0
2023	GB	17	11	84	58	26	1.0	0	3	0	0	0.0	0	0	1	1	27	1
2024	CHI	17	5	49	30	19	0.0	0	2	1	0	0.0	0	0	1	2	13	0
2025	CHI	17	0	19	9	10	0.0	0	0	0	0	0.0	0	0	0	0	0	0
Career		82	35	295	191	104	2.0	0	10	2	7	3.5	7	0	2	4	46	1

=== Postseason ===
Year	Team	Games		Tackles					Interceptions						Fumbles	
Year	Team	GP	GS	Cmb	Solo	Ast	Sck	Sfty	PD	Int	Yds	Avg	Lng	TD	FF	FR
2023	GB	2	2	7	4	3	0.0	0	0	0	0	0.0	0	0	0	0
Career		2	2	7	4	3	0.0	0	0	0	0	0.0	0	0	0	0

== Personal life ==
Owens and gymnast Simone Biles announced their engagement on February 15, 2022. They married on April 22, 2023.

Owens was granted time off from Chicago Bears training camp to watch Biles compete in Paris at the 2024 Summer Olympics.
