= 2023 Tennessee Titans season =

64th season in franchise history

- Owner: KSA Industries
- General manager: Ran Carthon
- Head coach: Mike Vrabel
- Home stadium: Nissan Stadium

Results
- Record: 6–11
- Division place: 4th AFC South
- Playoffs: Did not qualify
- Pro Bowlers: RB Derrick Henry

Uniform
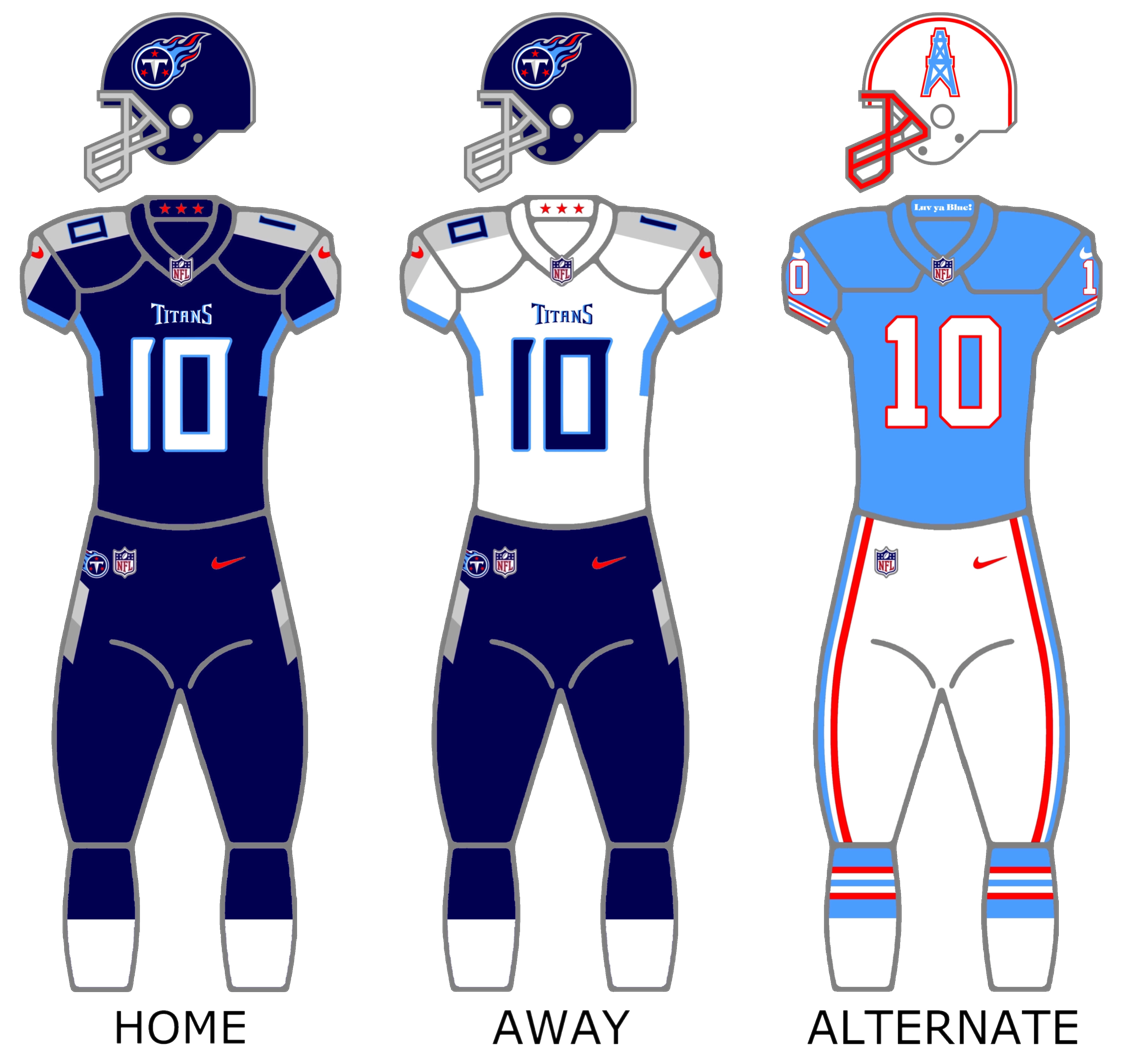

The 2023 season was the Tennessee Titans' 54th season in the National Football League (NFL), their 64th overall, their 27th in the state of Tennessee and their sixth and final under head coach Mike Vrabel. The Titans attempted to improve upon their underachieving 7–10 record from last year. They also attempted to make it back to the playoffs after missing them for the first time since 2018. However, after a Week 15 loss to the Houston Texans in overtime, they were eliminated from playoff contention for the second year in a row. The following week they were locked to last in the AFC South after losing to the Seattle Seahawks 20–17 in Week 16, and they failed to improve on their 7–10 record from 2022. The Titans would lose many close games this year, with 7 out of their 11 losses being decided 8 points or less. They also lost 5 of their games by a combined 14 points. On January 9, the Titans fired Vrabel.

The Tennessee Titans drew an average home attendance of 64,520 in 9 home games in the 2023 NFL season.

== Offseason ==
=== Coaching changes ===
On January 9, 2023, the Titans fired offensive coordinator Todd Downing, offensive line coach Keith Carter, secondary coach Anthony Midget, and offensive skill assistant Erik Frazier. Under Downing in 2022, the Titans' offense was 30th in the league in yards and 28th in points-per-game. Fans had called for his firing since during the 2021 season, and many celebrated his departure. Carter's offensive line under his tenure was consistently ranked low, and Midget's secondary finished 2022 as worst in the league in passing yards. On February 7, passing game coordinator Tim Kelly was promoted to offensive coordinator, Charles London was hired as the quarterbacks coach from the Atlanta Falcons, and Chris Harris was hired as the defensive pass game coordinator/cornerbacks coach from the Washington Commanders. Lori Locust was hired from the Tampa Bay Buccaneers as the first full-time female coach in Titans history, alongside Justin Hamilton, as defensive quality control coaches. Jason Houghtaling was promoted to offensive line coach, Luke Steckel was moved to run game analyst, Pat O'Hara was moved to pass game analyst, and Tony Dews was moved to tight ends coach.

=== Organizational changes ===
On January 18, 2023, the Titans hired San Francisco 49ers executive Ran Carthon as their new general manager. The Titans had fired previous general manager Jon Robinson in December 2022 at the beginning of their seven-game losing streak.

=== Roster changes ===
==== Reserve/future free agent contracts ====
Player	Position
Curtis Brooks	DE
Shyheim Carter	CB
Zack Johnson	G
Mason Kinsey	WR
John Leglue	OT
Zach McCloud	OLB
Thomas Odukoya	TE
Sam Okuayinonu	OLB
Jayden Peevy	DE
Justin Rigg	TE
Reggie Roberson	WR
Andrew Rupcich	OT
Tyler Shelvin	NT
Caleb Shudak	K

The Titans signed 11 players to futures contracts on January 10, 2023. By January 23, the Titans had signed three additional players.

=== Draft ===
2023 Tennessee Titans draft selections
Round	Selection	Player	Position	College	Notes
1	11	Peter Skoronski	OT	Northwestern	
2	33	Will Levis	QB	Kentucky	From Houston via Arizona (Note: The Titans traded second- and third-round selections (41st and 72nd overall), and a 2024 third-round selection to the Arizona Cardinals in exchange for second- and third-round selections (33rd and 81st overall).)
2	41	Traded to the Arizona Cardinals			
3	72	Traded to the Arizona Cardinals			
3	81	Tyjae Spears	RB	Tulane	From Cardinals
4	110	Traded to the Atlanta Falcons (Note: The Titans traded a fourth-round selection (110th overall) and a 2022 second-round selection to the Atlanta Falcons in exchange for a sixth-round selection (186th overall) and WR Julio Jones.)			
5	147	Josh Whyle	TE	Cincinnati	
6	186	Jaelyn Duncan	OT	Maryland	From Atlanta
6	189	Traded to the Los Angeles Rams (Note: The Titans traded a sixth-round selection (189th overall) to the Los Angeles Rams in exchange for WR Robert Woods.)			
7	228	Colton Dowell	WR	UT Martin	

Draft trades

=== Undrafted free agents ===
The Titans signed 22 undrafted free agents.

Player	Position	College
Anthony Kendall	DB	Baldwin-Wallace
Mo Hasan	QB	USC
Sammy Wheeler	LS	Kansas State
Jahleel Billingsley	TE	Texas
Shea Pitts	LB	UCLA
Keenan Agnew	DL	Southern Illinois
Eric Garror	CB	Louisiana Lafayette
Tyreque Jones	DB	Boise State
Maxwell Worship	S/LB	Vanderbilt
Matthew Jackson	LB	Eastern Kentucky
Tre'Shaun Harrison	WR	Oregon State
Shakel Brown	DL	Troy
Thomas Rush	LB	Minnesota
Kearis Jackson	WR	Georgia
Trey Wolff	K	Texas Tech
Jacob Copeland	WR	Maryland
John Ojukwu	OT	Boise State
Caleb Murphy	EDGE	Ferris State
T. K. McLendon	EDGE	Eastern Kentucky
Steven Jones Jr.	CB	Appalachian State
Charles McClelland	RB	Cincinnati
Otis Reese IV	LB	Mississippi

== Staff ==
2023 Tennessee Titans staff
Front office: Owner – KSA Industries; Controlling owner – Amy Adams Strunk; President/CEO – Burke Nihill; General manager – Ran Carthon; Assistant general manager, strategy – Chad Brinker; Assistant general manager – Anthony Robinson; Vice president of football administration – Vin Marino; Director of college scouting – Jon Salge; Director of pro scouting – Brian Gardner; Assistant director of pro scouting – Kevin Turks; College scout – Matt Miller; Head coaches: Head coach – Mike Vrabel; Assistant head coach/defensive line – Terrell Williams; Offensive coaches: Offensive coordinator – Tim Kelly; Pass game coordinator/quarterbacks – Charles London; Run game coordinator/running backs – Justin Outten; Wide receivers – Rob Moore; Tight ends – Tony Dews; Offensive line – Jason Houghtaling; Offensive line assistant – Matt Jones; Assistant offensive line – Mike Sullivan; Passing game analyst – Pat O'Hara; Offensive assistant – Kylan Butler	Defensive coaches: Defensive coordinator – Shane Bowen; Outside linebackers – Ryan Crow; Inside linebackers – Bobby King; Inside linebackers assistant – Zak Kuhr; Defensive pass game coordinator/cornerbacks − Chris Harris; Safeties – Scott Booker; Defensive assistant – Clint McMillan; Defensive quality control – Justin Hamilton; Defensive quality control – Lori Locust; Special teams coaches: Special teams coordinator – Tom Quinn; Special teams assistant – Anthony Levine; Strength and conditioning: Director of sports performance – Frank Piraino; Assistant director of sports performance – Brian Bell; Sports performance assistant – Tyler Rouse

== Final roster ==
2023 Tennessee Titans roster
Quarterbacks (QB): 8 Will Levis; 17 Ryan Tannehill; 7 Malik Willis; Running backs (RB): 22 Derrick Henry; 32 Tyjae Spears; 20 Jonathan Ward; Wide receivers (WR): 16 Treylon Burks; 10 DeAndre Hopkins; 12 Mason Kinsey; 11 Chris Moore; 18 Kyle Philips; Tight ends (TE): 85 Chig Okonkwo; 86 Kevin Rader; 88 Trevon Wesco	Offensive linemen (OL): 55 Aaron Brewer C; 60 Daniel Brunskill G; 71 Andre Dillard T; 79 Jaelyn Duncan T; 62 Corey Levin C; 61 John Ojukwu T; 75 Dillon Radunz G; 76 Andrew Rupcich T; 77 Peter Skoronski G; 72 Calvin Throckmorton G; Defensive linemen (DL): 96 Denico Autry DE; 90 Ross Blacklock DE; 99 Quinton Bohanna NT; 91 Keondre Coburn NT; 92 Marlon Davidson DE; 94 Jaleel Johnson DE; 69 T. K. McLendon Jr. DE	Linebackers (LB): 2 Azeez Al-Shaair ILB; 47 JoJo Domann ILB; 51 Trevis Gipson OLB; 49 Arden Key OLB; 58 Harold Landry OLB; 42 Caleb Murphy OLB; 41 Otis Reese IV ILB; 54 Garret Wallow ILB; 99 Rashad Weaver OLB; Defensive backs (DB): 23 Tre Avery CB; 44 Mike Brown SS; 38 Terrell Edmunds FS; 33 Eric Garror CB; 39 Matthew Jackson SS; 40 Anthony Kendall CB; 21 Roger McCreary CB; 24 Elijah Molden FS; 0 Sean Murphy-Bunting CB; 35 K'Von Wallace FS; Special teams (ST): 46 Morgan Cox LS; 6 Nick Folk K; 13 Ty Zentner P	Practice squad: 87 Devin Asiasi TE; 28 Shyheim Carter S; 53 Tae Crowder LB; 64 James Empey C; 30 Tay Gowan CB; 82 Tre'Shaun Harrison WR; 93 David Moa DE; 89 Thomas Odukoya TE (IPP); 25 Darius Phillips CB; 70 Jordan Roos G; 48 Thomas Rush OLB; 36 Kendall Sheffield CB; 73 Lachavious Simmons T; 80 Shi Smith WR; 29 Josh Thompson S; Reserve: 91 Shakel Brown DE (IR); 45 Chance Campbell ILB (IR); 36 Julius Chestnut RB (IR); 14 Colton Dowell WR (IR); 3 Caleb Farley CB (PUP); 26 Kristian Fulton CB (IR); 50 Jack Gibbens ILB (IR); 57 Luke Gifford ILB (IR); 25 Hassan Haskins RB (IR); 37 Amani Hooker SS (IR); 66 Chris Hubbard T (IR); 5 Kearis Jackson WR (IR); 52 Joseph Jones ILB (IR); 95 Kyle Peko DE (IR); 78 Nicholas Petit-Frere T (IR); 98 Jeffery Simmons DE (IR); 4 Ryan Stonehouse P (IR); 15 Nick Westbrook-Ikhine WR (IR); 81 Josh Whyle TE (IR); Rookies in italics 53 active, 19 reserve, 14 practice squad (1 exempt)

=== Team captains ===
- Ryan Tannehill (QB)
- Derrick Henry (RB)
- Kevin Byard (FS)
- Jeffery Simmons (DE)
- Azeez Al-Shaair (LB)
- Aaron Brewer (C)
- Morgan Cox (LS)

== Preseason ==
The Titans' preseason opponents and schedule was announced in the spring.

Week	Date	Opponent	Result	Record	Venue	Recap
1	August 12	at Chicago Bears	L 17–23	0–1	Soldier Field	Recap
2	August 19	at Minnesota Vikings	W 24–16	1–1	U.S. Bank Stadium	Recap
3	August 25	New England Patriots	W 23–7	2–1	Nissan Stadium	Recap

== Regular season ==
=== Schedule ===
Week	Date	Opponent	Result	Record	Venue	Recap
1	September 10	at New Orleans Saints	**L** 15–16	0–1	Caesars Superdome	Recap
2	September 17	Los Angeles Chargers	**W** 27–24 (OT)	1–1	Nissan Stadium	Recap
3	September 24	at Cleveland Browns	**L** 3–27	1–2	Cleveland Browns Stadium	Recap
4	October 1	Cincinnati Bengals	**W** 27–3	2–2	Nissan Stadium	Recap
5	October 8	at **Indianapolis Colts**	**L** 16–23	2–3	Lucas Oil Stadium	Recap
6	October 15	Baltimore Ravens	**L** 16–24	2–4	(United Kingdom) Tottenham Hotspur Stadium (London)	Recap
7	Bye					
8	October 29	Atlanta Falcons	**W** 28–23	3–4	Nissan Stadium	Recap
9	November 2	at Pittsburgh Steelers	**L** 16–20	3–5	Acrisure Stadium	Recap
10	November 12	at Tampa Bay Buccaneers	**L** 6–20	3–6	Raymond James Stadium	Recap
11	November 19	at **Jacksonville Jaguars**	**L** 14–34	3–7	EverBank Stadium	Recap
12	November 26	Carolina Panthers	**W** 17–10	4–7	Nissan Stadium	Recap
13	December 3	**Indianapolis Colts**	**L** 28–31 (OT)	4–8	Nissan Stadium	Recap
14	December 11	at Miami Dolphins	**W** 28–27	5–8	Hard Rock Stadium	Recap
15	December 17	**Houston Texans**	**L** 16–19 (OT)	5–9	Nissan Stadium	Recap
16	December 24	Seattle Seahawks	**L** 17–20	5–10	Nissan Stadium	Recap
17	December 31	at **Houston Texans**	**L** 3–26	5–11	NRG Stadium	Recap
18	January 7	**Jacksonville Jaguars**	**W** 28–20	6–11	Nissan Stadium	Recap

Note: Intra-division opponents are in bold text.

=== Game summaries ===
==== Week 1: at New Orleans Saints ====
Week 1: Tennessee Titans at New Orleans Saints – Game summary

Quarter	1	2	3	4	Total
Titans	6	3	0	6	**15**
**Saints**	3	3	10	0	**16**

at Caesars Superdome, New Orleans, Louisiana

- Date: September 10
- Game time: 12:00 p.m. CDT
- Game weather: None (indoor stadium)
- Game attendance: 70,024
- Referee: Ronald Torbert
- TV announcers (CBS): Chris Lewis, Jason McCourty, Ross Tucker and Amanda Guerra
- Recap, Game Book

Game information

**First quarter**

- TEN – Nick Folk 50-yard field goal, 13:40. Titans 3–0. **Drive: 4 plays, 8 yards, 1:16.**
- NO – Blake Grupe 26-yard field goal, 10:18. Tied 3–3. **Drive: 9 plays, 67 yards, 3:22.**
- TEN – Nick Folk 27-yard field goal, 3:07. Titans 6–3. **Drive: 11 plays, 66 yards, 7:11.**

**Second quarter**

- NO – Blake Grupe 33-yard field goal, 7:37. Tied 6–6. **Drive: 7 plays, 14 yards, 2:17.**
- TEN – Nick Folk 31-yard field goal, 1:40. Titans 9–6. **Drive: 7 plays, 57 yards, 2:49.**

**Third quarter**

- NO – Blake Grupe 52-yard field goal, 9:25. Tied 9–9. **Drive: 7 plays, 60 yards, 3:30.**
- NO – Rashid Shaheed 19-yard pass from Derek Carr (Blake Grupe kick), 1:23. Saints 16–9. **Drive: 5 plays, 33 yards, 1:45.**

**Fourth quarter**

- TEN – Nick Folk 45-yard field goal, 11:12. Saints 16–12. **Drive: 12 plays, 48 yards, 5:11.**
- TEN – Nick Folk 29-yard field goal, 2:17. Saints 16–15. **Drive: 9 plays, 62 yards, 4:25.**

**Top passers**

- TEN – Ryan Tannehill – 16/34, 198 yards, 3 INT
- NO – Derek Carr – 23/33, 305 yards, TD, INT

**Top rushers**

- TEN – Derrick Henry – 15 rushes, 63 yards
- NO – Jamaal Williams – 18 rushes, 45 yards

**Top receivers**

- TEN – DeAndre Hopkins – 7 receptions, 65 yards
- NO – Chris Olave – 8 receptions, 112 yards

==== Week 2: vs. Los Angeles Chargers ====
Week 2: Los Angeles Chargers at Tennessee Titans – Game summary

Quarter	1	2	3	4	OT	Total
Chargers	3	11	0	10	0	**24**
**Titans**	0	10	7	7	3	**27**

at Nissan Stadium, Nashville, Tennessee

- Date: September 17
- Game time: 12:00 p.m. CDT
- Game weather: Cloudy, 64 °F (18 °C)
- Game attendance: 67,438
- Referee: Alan Eck
- TV announcers (CBS): Tom McCarthy, James Lofton, Jay Feely and Tiffany Blackmon
- Recap, Game Book

Game information

**First quarter**

- LAC – Cameron Dicker 27-yard field goal, 3:46. Chargers 3–0. **Drive: 11 plays, 39 yards, 4:25.**

**Second quarter**

- LAC – Keenan Allen 8-yard pass from Justin Herbert (Justin Herbert-Trey Pipkins pass), 8:16. Chargers 11–0. **Drive: 8 plays, 47 yards, 3:34.**
- TEN – Derrick Henry 1-yard run (Nick Folk kick), 7:09. Chargers 11–7. **Drive: 3 plays, 75 yards, 1:07.**
- LAC – Cameron Dicker 30-yard field goal, 4:23. Chargers 14–7. **Drive: 7 plays, 63 yards, 2:46.**
- TEN – Nick Folk 33-yard field goal, 0:00. Chargers 14–10. **Drive: 9 plays, 60 yards, 4:23.**

**Third quarter**

- TEN – Ryan Tannehill 12-yard run (Nick Folk kick), 10:08. Titans 17–14. **Drive: 9 plays, 75 yards, 4:52.**

**Fourth quarter**

- LAC – Keenan Allen 12-yard pass from Justin Herbert (Cameron Dicker kick), 14:38. Chargers 21–17. **Drive: 7 plays, 80 yards, 3:01.**
- TEN – Nick Westbrook-Ikhine 4-yard pass from Ryan Tannehill (Nick Folk kick), 2:22. Titans 24–21. **Drive: 7 plays, 82 yards, 3:38.**
- LAC – Cameron Dicker 33-yard field goal, 0:00. Tied 24–24. **Drive: 10 plays, 60 yards, 2:22.**

**Overtime**

- TEN – Nick Folk 41-yard field goal, 5:02. Titans 27–24. **Drive: 8 plays, 38 yards, 4:30.**

**Top passers**

- LAC – Justin Herbert – 27/41, 305 yards, 2 TD
- TEN – Ryan Tannehill – 20/24, 246 yards, TD

**Top rushers**

- LAC – Joshua Kelley – 13 rushes, 39 yards
- TEN – Derrick Henry – 25 rushes, 80 yards, TD

**Top receivers**

- LAC – Keenan Allen – 8 receptions, 111 yards, 2 TD
- TEN – Treylon Burks – 3 rushes, 76 yards

==== Week 3: at Cleveland Browns ====
Week 3: Tennessee Titans at Cleveland Browns – Game summary

Quarter	1	2	3	4	Total
Titans	0	3	0	0	**3**
**Browns**	3	10	7	7	**27**

at Cleveland Browns Stadium, Cleveland, Ohio

- Date: September 24
- Game time: 1:00 p.m. EDT/12:00 p.m. CDT
- Game weather: Sun/Clouds, 68 °F (20 °C)
- Game attendance: 67,919
- Referee: Craig Wrolstad
- TV announcers (CBS): Spero Dedes, Adam Archuleta and Aditi Kinkhabwala
- Recap, Game Book

Game information

**First quarter**

- CLE – Dustin Hopkins 48-yard field goal, 7:49. Browns 3–0. **Drive: 12 plays, 48 yards, 7:11.**

**Second quarter**

- TEN – Nick Folk 44-yard field goal, 14:14. Tied 3–3. **Drive: 4 plays, 9 yards, 2:06.**
- CLE – Jerome Ford 19-yard pass from Deshaun Watson (Dustin Hopkins kick), 9:39. Browns 10–3. **Drive: 9 plays, 75 yards, 4:35.**
- CLE – Dustin Hopkins 52-yard field goal, 1:00. Browns 13–3. **Drive: 7 plays, 46 yards, 2:49.**

**Third quarter**

- CLE – Jerome Ford 3-yard run (Dustin Hopkins kick), 5:49. Browns 20–3. **Drive: 11 plays, 85 yards, 5:34.**

**Fourth quarter**

- CLE – Amari Cooper 43-yard pass from Deshaun Watson (Dustin Hopkins kick), 6:51. Browns 27–3. **Drive: 10 plays, 64 yards, 6:28.**

**Top passers**

- TEN – Ryan Tannehill – 13/25, 104 yards
- CLE – Deshaun Watson – 27/33, 289 yards, 2 TD

**Top rushers**

- TEN – Derrick Henry – 11 rushes, 20 yards
- CLE – Pierre Strong Jr. – 6 rushes, 27 yards

**Top receivers**

- TEN – DeAndre Hopkins – 3 receptions, 48 yards
- CLE – Amari Cooper – 7 receptions, 116 yards, TD

==== Week 4: vs. Cincinnati Bengals ====
Week 4: Cincinnati Bengals at Tennessee Titans – Game summary

Quarter	1	2	3	4	Total
Bengals	3	0	0	0	**3**
**Titans**	3	21	3	0	**27**

at Nissan Stadium, Nashville, Tennessee

- Date: October 1
- Game time: 12:00 p.m. CDT
- Game weather: Sunny, 82 °F (28 °C)
- Game attendance: 68,951
- Referee: Shawn Smith
- TV announcers (Fox): Adam Amin, Mark Schlereth and Kristina Pink
- Recap, Game Book

Game information

**First quarter**

- CIN – Evan McPherson 21-yard field goal, 9:12. Bengals 3–0. **Drive: 11 plays, 72 yards, 5:48.**
- TEN – Nick Folk 53-yard field goal, 1:24. Tied 3–3. **Drive: 15 plays, 40 yards, 7:48.**

**Second quarter**

- TEN – Nick Westbrook-Ikhine 13-yard pass from Ryan Tannehill (Nick Folk kick), 6:31. Titans 10–3. **Drive: 5 plays, 78 yards, 2:54.**
- TEN – Derrick Henry 29-yard run (Nick Folk kick), 3:58. Titans 17–3. **Drive: 4 plays, 73 yards, 1:41.**
- TEN – Josh Whyle 2-yard pass from Derrick Henry (Nick Folk kick), 0:10. Titans 24–3. **Drive: 7 plays, 80 yards, 1:10.**

**Third quarter**

- TEN – Nick Folk 35-yard field goal, 4:38. Titans 27–3. **Drive: 15 plays, 65 yards, 10:22.**

**Fourth quarter**

- No scoring plays.

**Top passers**

- CIN – Joe Burrow – 20/30, 165 yards
- TEN – Ryan Tannehill – 18/25, 240 yards, TD, INT

**Top rushers**

- CIN – Joe Mixon – 14 rushes, 67 yards
- TEN – Derrick Henry – 22 rushes, 122 yards, TD

**Top receivers**

- CIN – Ja'Marr Chase – 7 receptions, 73 yards
- TEN – DeAndre Hopkins – 4 receptions, 63 yards

==== Week 5: at Indianapolis Colts ====
Week 5: Tennessee Titans at Indianapolis Colts – Game summary

Quarter	1	2	3	4	Total
Titans	3	3	10	0	**16**
**Colts**	7	3	7	6	**23**

at Lucas Oil Stadium, Indianapolis, Indiana

- Date: October 8
- Game time: 1:00 p.m. EDT/12:00 p.m. CDT
- Game weather: Cloudy, 53 °F (12 °C) (retractable roof open)
- Game attendance: 65,287
- Referee: Brad Rogers
- TV announcers (CBS): Spero Dedes, Adam Archuleta and Amanda Renner
- Recap, Game Book

Game information

**First quarter**

- TEN – Nick Folk 27-yard field goal, 3:13. Titans 3–0. **Drive: 16 plays, 75 yards, 8:31.**
- IND – Zack Moss 56-yard run (Matt Gay kick), 0:41. Colts 7–3. **Drive: 5 plays, 75 yards, 2:32.**

**Second quarter**

- IND – Matt Gay 43-yard field goal, 9:32. Colts 10–3. **Drive: 10 plays, 40 yards, 5:06.**
- TEN – Nick Folk 53-yard field goal, 4:39. Colts 10–6. **Drive: 10 plays, 48 yards, 4:53.**

**Third quarter**

- TEN – Tyjae Spears 19-yard run (Nick Folk kick), 12:48. Titans 13–10. **Drive: 4 plays, 75 yards, 2:12.**
- IND – Zack Moss 3-yard run (Matt Gay kick), 8:00. Colts 17–13. **Drive: 9 plays, 75 yards, 4:48.**
- TEN – Nick Folk 34-yard field goal, 2:02. Colts 17–16. **Drive: 11 plays, 59 yards, 5:58.**

**Fourth quarter**

- IND – Matt Gay 35-yard field goal, 13:22. Colts 20–16. **Drive: 7 plays, 58 yards, 3:40.**
- IND – Matt Gay 28-yard field goal, 1:00. Colts 23–16. **Drive: 14 plays, 84 yards, 7:03.**

**Top passers**

- TEN – Ryan Tannehill – 23/34, 264 yards, INT
- IND – Gardner Minshew – 11/14, 155 yards

**Top rushers**

- TEN – Derrick Henry – 13 rushes, 43 yards
- IND – Zack Moss – 23 rushes, 165 yards, 2 TD

**Top receivers**

- TEN – Dustin Hopkins – 8 receptions, 140 yards
- IND – Josh Downs – 6 receptions, 97 yards

==== Week 6: vs. Baltimore Ravens ====
NFL London games

Week 6: Baltimore Ravens at Tennessee Titans – Game summary

Quarter	1	2	3	4	Total
**Ravens**	6	12	0	6	**24**
Titans	3	0	10	3	**16**

at Tottenham Hotspur Stadium, London, England

- Date: October 15
- Game time: 2:30 p.m. BST/8:30 a.m. CDT
- Game weather: Sunny, 52 °F (11 °C)
- Game attendance: 61,011
- Referee: Bill Vinovich
- TV announcers (WTVF/NFLN): Rich Eisen, Kurt Warner and Jamie Erdahl
- Recap, Game Book

Game information

**First quarter**

- BAL – Justin Tucker 41-yard field goal, 10:26. Ravens 3–0. **Drive: 8 plays, 50 yards, 4:34.**
- TEN – Nick Folk 26-yard field goal, 5:34. Tied 3–3. **Drive: 9 plays, 67 yards, 4:52.**
- BAL – Justin Tucker 28-yard field goal, 0:04. Ravens 6–3. **Drive: 10 plays, 76 yards, 5:30.**

**Second quarter**

- BAL – Justin Tucker 23-yard field goal, 6:12. Ravens 9–3. **Drive: 6 plays, 12 yards, 3:27.**
- BAL – Zay Flowers 10-yard pass from Lamar Jackson (kick blocked), 3:28. Ravens 15–3. **Drive: 10 plays, 80 yards, 5:11.**
- BAL – Justin Tucker 29-yard field goal, 0:00. Ravens 18–3. **Drive: 1 play, 0 yards, 0:01.**

**Third quarter**

- TEN – Nick Folk 27-yard field goal, 9:24. Ravens 18–6. **Drive: 7 plays, 83 yards, 2:31.**
- TEN – Derrick Henry 15-yard run (Nick Folk kick), 8:24. Ravens 18–13. **Drive: 1 play, 25 yards, 0:13.**

**Fourth quarter**

- BAL – Justin Tucker 20-yard field goal, 12:49. Ravens 21–13. **Drive: 13 plays, 54 yards, 6:38.**
- BAL – Justin Tucker 36-yard field goal, 04:16. Ravens 24–13. **Drive: 11 plays, 71 yards, 4:39.**
- TEN – Nick Folk 38-yard field goal, 0:38. Ravens 24–16. **Drive: 10 plays, 55 yards, 3:38.**

**Top passers**

- BAL – Lamar Jackson – 21/30, 223 yards, TD, INT
- TEN – Ryan Tannehill – 8/16, 76 yards, INT

**Top rushers**

- BAL – Lamar Jackson – 13 rushes, 62 yards
- TEN – Derrick Henry – 12 rushes, 97 yards, TD

**Top receivers**

- BAL – Mark Andrews – 4 receptions, 69 yards
- TEN – Tyjae Spears – 1 reception, 48 yards

==== Week 8: vs. Atlanta Falcons ====
Week 8: Atlanta Falcons at Tennessee Titans – Game summary

Quarter	1	2	3	4	Total
Falcons	3	0	6	14	**23**
**Titans**	7	7	7	7	**28**

at Nissan Stadium, Nashville, Tennessee

- Date: October 29
- Game time: 12:00 p.m. CDT
- Game weather: Cloudy, 77 °F (25 °C)
- Game attendance: 68,008
- Referee: Clay Martin
- TV announcers (CBS): Beth Mowins, James Lofton, Jay Feely and Amanda Guerra
- Recap, Game Book

Game information

**First quarter**

- ATL – Younghoe Koo 29-yard field goal, 9:47. Falcons 3–0. **Drive: 7 plays, 18 yards, 3:15.**
- TEN — DeAndre Hopkins 47-yard pass from Will Levis (Nick Folk kick), 2:28. Titans 7–3. **Drive: 4 plays, 61 yards, 1:52.**

**Second quarter**

- TEN — DeAndre Hopkins 16-yard pass from Will Levis (Nick Folk kick), 5:27. Titans 14–3. **Drive: 5 plays, 33 yards, 2:50.**

**Third quarter**

- ATL – Younghoe Koo 49-yard field goal, 12:06. Titans 14–6. **Drive: 7 plays, 44 yards, 2:54.**
- ATL – Younghoe Koo 39-yard field goal, 3:02. Titans 14–9. **Drive: 11 plays, 59 yards, 4:06.**
- TEN — DeAndre Hopkins 61-yard pass from Will Levis (Nick Folk kick), 1:37. Titans 21–9. **Drive: 3 plays, 75 yards, 1:25.**

**Fourth quarter**

- ATL – Bijan Robinson 13-yard run (Younghoe Koo kick), 14:17. Titans 21–16. **Drive: 5 plays, 75 yards, 2:20.**
- TEN — Nick Westbrook-Ikhine 33-yard pass from Will Levis (Nick Folk kick), 6:59. Titans 28–16. **Drive: 9 plays, 85 yards, 4:52.**
- ATL — Scotty Miller 8-yard pass from Taylor Heinicke (Younghoe Koo kick), 3:46. Titans 28–23. **Drive: 8 plays, 75 yards, 3:13.**

**Top passers**

- ATL – Taylor Heinicke – 12/21, 175 yards, TD
- TEN – Will Levis – 19/29, 238 yards, 4 TD

**Top rushers**

- ATL – Bijan Robinson – 11 rushes, 62 yards, TD
- TEN – Derrick Henry – 22 rushes, 101 yards

**Top receivers**

- ATL – Drake London – 5 receptions, 55 yards
- TEN – DeAndre Hopkins – 4 receptions, 128 yards, 3 TD

==== Week 9: at Pittsburgh Steelers ====
Week 9: Tennessee Titans at Pittsburgh Steelers – Game summary

Quarter	1	2	3	4	Total
Titans	3	10	3	0	**16**
**Steelers**	7	3	3	7	**20**

at Acrisure Stadium, Pittsburgh, Pennsylvania

- Date: November 2
- Game time: 8:15 p.m. EST/7:15 p.m. CST
- Game weather: Mostly clear, 40 °F (4 °C)
- Game attendance: 65,969
- Referee: John Hussey
- TV announcers (WTVF/Prime Video): Al Michaels, Kirk Herbstreit and Kaylee Hartung
- Recap, Game Book

Game information

**First quarter**

- PIT – Najee Harris 10-yard run (Chris Boswell kick), 10:11. Steelers 7–0. **Drive: 10 plays, 78 yards, 4:49.**
- TEN — Nick Folk 36-yard field goal, 2:48. Steelers 7–3. **Drive: 14 plays, 72 yards, 7:23.**

**Second quarter**

- TEN — Derrick Henry 2-yard run (Nick Folk kick), 6:35. Titans 10–7. **Drive: 11 plays, 73 yards, 6:26.**
- PIT – Chris Boswell 29-yard field goal, 1:16. Tied 10–10. **Drive: 10 plays, 65 yards, 5:19.**
- TEN – Nick Folk 36-yard field goal, 0:00. Titans 13–10. **Drive: 8 plays, 57 yards, 1:16.**

**Third quarter**

- PIT – Chris Boswell 30-yard field goal, 5:41. Tied 13–13. **Drive: 15 plays, 75 yards, 8:17.**
- TEN – Nick Folk 48-yard field goal, 0:19. Titans 16–13. **Drive: 9 plays, 45 yards, 5:22.**

**Fourth quarter**

- PTT — Diontae Johnson 3-yard pass from Kenny Pickett (Chris Boswell kick), 4:02. Steelers 20–16. **Drive: 11 plays, 92 yards, 5:11.**

**Top passers**

- TEN – Will Levis – 22/39, 262 yards, INT
- PIT – Kenny Pickett – 19/30, 160 yards, TD

**Top rushers**

- TEN – Derrick Henry – 17 rushes, 75 yards, TD
- PIT – Jaylen Warren – 11 rushes, 88 yards

**Top receivers**

- TEN – Kyle Philips – 4 receptions, 68 yards
- PIT – Diontae Johnson – 7 receptions, 90 yards, TD

==== Week 10: at Tampa Bay Buccaneers ====
Week 10: Tennessee Titans at Tampa Bay Buccaneers – Game summary

Quarter	1	2	3	4	Total
Titans	3	0	0	3	**6**
**Buccaneers**	0	7	10	3	**20**

at Raymond James Stadium, Tampa, Florida

- Date: November 12
- Game time: 1:00 p.m. EST/12:00 p.m. CST
- Game weather: Cloudy, 85 °F (29 °C)
- Game attendance: 62,725
- Referee: Alan Eck
- TV announcers (CBS): Andrew Catalon, Tiki Barber, Matt Ryan and AJ Ross
- Recap, Game Book

Game information

**First quarter**

- TEN – Nick Folk 38-yard field goal, 8:34. Titans 3–0. **Drive: 12 plays, 55 yards, 6:26.**

**Second quarter**

- TB – Rachaad White 43-yard pass from Baker Mayfield (Chase McLaughlin kick), 5:39. Buccaneers 7–3. **Drive: 6 plays, 85 yards, 3:09.**

**Third quarter**

- TB – Chase McLaughlin 25-yard field goal, 10:42. Buccaneers 10–3. **Drive: 11 plays, 68 yards, 4:18.**
- TB – Mike Evans 22-yard pass from Baker Mayfield (Chase McLaughlin kick), 2:46. Buccaneers 17–3. **Drive: 8 plays, 80 yards, 4:45.**

**Fourth quarter**

- TEN – Nick Folk 27-yard field goal, 12:54. Buccaneers 17–6. **Drive: 11 plays, 66 yards, 4:52.**
- TB – Chase McLaughlin 35-yard field goal, 7:01. Buccaneers 20–6. **Drive: 11 plays, 58 yards, 5:53.**

**Top passers**

- TEN – Will Levis – 19/39, 199 yards, INT
- TB – Baker Mayfield – 18/29, 278 yards, 2 TD, INT

**Top rushers**

- TEN – Derrick Henry – 11 rushes, 24 yards
- TB – Rachaad White – 20 rushes, 51 yards

**Top receivers**

- TEN – Tyjae Spears – 4 receptions, 42 yards
- TB – Mike Evans – 6 receptions, 143 yards, TD

==== Week 11: at Jacksonville Jaguars ====
Week 11: Tennessee Titans at Jacksonville Jaguars – Game summary

Quarter	1	2	3	4	Total
Titans	0	0	7	7	**14**
**Jaguars**	7	6	14	7	**34**

at EverBank Stadium, Jacksonville, Florida

- Date: November 19
- Game time: 1:00 p.m. EST/12:00 p.m. CST
- Game weather: 75 °F (24 °C)
- Game attendance: 67,175
- Referee: Brad Rogers
- TV announcers (CBS): Spero Dedes, Adam Archuleta and Amanda Renner
- Recap, Game Book

Game information

**First quarter**

- JAX – Calvin Ridley 3-yard pass from Trevor Lawrence (Brandon McManus kick), 2:58. Jaguars 7–0. **Drive: 8 plays, 57 yards, 4:43.**

**Second quarter**

- JAX – Brandon McManus 30-yard field goal, 2:43. Jaguars 10–0. **Drive: 11 plays, 77 yards, 6:16.**
- JAX – Brandon McManus 25-yard field goal, 0:14. Jaguars 13–0. **Drive: 11 plays, 65 yards, 1:34.**

**Third quarter**

- JAX – Trevor Lawrence 9-yard run (Brandon McManus kick), 9:12. Jaguars 20–0. **Drive: 9 plays, 73 yards, 5:48.**
- JAX – Calvin Ridley 20-yard pass from Trevor Lawrence (Brandon McManus kick), 3:22. Jaguars 27–0. **Drive: 6 plays, 80 yards, 3:29.**
- TEN – DeAndre Hopkins 43-yard pass from Will Levis (Nick Folk kick), 0:00. Jaguars 27–7. **Drive: 5 plays, 75 yards, 3:22.**

**Fourth quarter**

- JAX – Trevor Lawrence 5-yard run (Brandon McManus kick), 7:28. Jaguars 34–7. **Drive: 9 plays, 36 yards, 5:26.**
- TEN – Jeffery Simmons 2-yard pass from Will Levis (Nick Folk kick), 4:28. Jaguars 34–14. **Drive: 5 plays, 75 yards, 3:00.**

**Best passers**

- TEN – Will Levis – 13/17, 158 yards, 2 TD
- JAX – Trevor Lawrence – 24/32, 262 yards, 2 TD

**Top rushers**

- TEN – Chris Moore – 1 rush, 38 yards
- JAX – Travis Etienne – 14 rushes, 52 yards

**Top receivers**

- SF – DeAndre Hopkins – 4 receptions, 59 yards, TD
- JAX – Christian Kirk – 7 receptions, 103 yards, 2 TD

==== Week 12: vs. Carolina Panthers ====
Week 12: Carolina Panthers at Tennessee Titans – Game summary

Quarter	1	2	3	4	Total
Panthers	0	3	7	0	**10**
**Titans**	7	10	0	0	**17**

at Nissan Stadium, Nashville, Tennessee

- Date: November 26
- Game time: 12:00 p.m. CST
- Game weather: Cloudy, 51 °F (11 °C)
- Game attendance: 62,493
- Referee: Ronald Torbert
- TV announcers (Fox): Adam Amin, Mark Schlereth and Kristina Pink
- Recap, Game Book

Game information

**First quarter**

- TEN – Derrick Henry 1-yard run (Nick Folk kick), 0:34. Titans 7–0. **Drive: 15 plays, 91 yards, 9:36.**

**Second quarter**

- CAR – Eddy Piñeiro 50-yard field goal, 8:51. Titans 7–3. **Drive: 14 plays, 47 yards, 6:43.**
- TEN – Derrick Henry 10-yard run (Nick Folk kick), 2:27. Titans 14–3. **Drive: 2 plays, 15 yards, 0:39.**
- TEN – Nick Folk 53-yard field goal, 0:53. Titans 17–3. **Drive: 5 plays, 27 yards, 0:28.**

**Third quarter**

- CAR – Chuba Hubbard 5-yard run (Eddy Piñeiro kick), 8:06. Titans 17–10. **Drive: 11 plays, 67 yards, 6:54.**

**Fourth quarter**

- No scoring plays.

**Top passers**

- CAR – Bryce Young – 18/31, 194 yards
- TEN – Will Levis – 18/28, 185 yards

**Top rushers**

- CAR – Chuba Hubbard – 14 rushes, 45 yards, TD
- TEN – Derrick Henry – 18 rushes, 76 yards, 2 TD

**Top receivers**

- CAR – Chuba Hubbard – 5 receptions, 47 yards
- TEN – Chig Okonkwo – 4 receptions, 45 yards

==== Week 13: vs. Indianapolis Colts ====
Week 13: Indianapolis Colts at Tennessee Titans – Game summary

Quarter	1	2	3	4	OT	Total
**Colts**	7	6	9	3	6	**31**
Titans	10	7	2	6	3	**28**

at Nissan Stadium, Nashville, Tennessee

- Date: December 3
- Game time: 12:00 p.m. CST
- Game weather: Partly sunny, 53 °F (12 °C)
- Game attendance: 62,641
- Referee: Craig Wrolstad
- TV announcers (CBS): Andrew Catalon, Tiki Barber, Matt Ryan and AJ Ross
- Recap, Game Book

Game information

**First quarter**

- TEN – Derrick Henry 22-yard run (Nick Folk kick), 13:20. Titans 7–0. **Drive: 4 plays, 64 yards, 1:40.**
- IND – Alec Pierce 36-yard pass from Gardner Minshew (Matt Gay kick), 12:05. Tied 7–7. **Drive: 3 plays, 56 yards, 1:15.**
- TEN – Nick Folk 24-yard field goal, 0:13. Titans 10–7. **Drive: 10 plays, 46 yards, 3:51.**

**Second quarter**

- TEN – Derrick Henry 5-yard run (Nick Folk kick), 10:22. Titans 17–7. **Drive: 8 plays, 77 yards, 4:19.**
- IND – Matt Gay 23-yard field goal, 7:39. Titans 17–10. **Drive: 8 plays, 70 yards, 2:43.**
- IND – Matt Gay 46-yard field goal, 0:04. Titans 17–13. **Drive: 6 plays, 16 yards, 0:39.**

**Third quarter**

- IND – Matt Gay 23-yard field goal, 4:57. Titans 17–16. **Drive: 19 plays, 70 yards, 10:03.**
- IND – Grant Stuard 18-yard return of blocked punt, 0:19. Colts 22–17.
- TEN – Amani Hooker defensive 2-point conversion, 0:19. Colts 22–19.

**Fourth quarter**

- IND – Matt Gay 28-yard field goal, 11:34. Colts 25–19. **Drive: 4 plays, −3 yards, 2:08.**
- TEN – DeAndre Hopkins 3-yard pass from Will Levis (kick failed), 5:26. Tied 25–25. **Drive: 11 plays, 75 yards, 6:08.**

**Overtime**

- TEN – Nick Folk 46-yard field goal, 4:19. Titans 28–25. **Drive: 10 plays, 48 yards, 5:41.**
- IND – Michael Pittman Jr. 4-yard pass from Gardner Minshew, 2:31. Colts 31–28. **Drive: 5 plays, 75 yards, 1:48.**

**Top passers**

- IND – Gardner Minshew – 26/42, 312 yards, 2 TD
- TEN – Will Levis – 16/33, 224 yards, TD

**Top rushers**

- IND – Zack Moss – 19 rushes, 51 yards
- TEN – Derrick Henry – 21 rushes, 102 yards, 2 TD

**Top receivers**

- IND – Michael Pittman Jr. – 11 receptions, 105 yards, TD
- TEN – DeAndre Hopkins – 5 receptions, 75 yards, TD

==== Week 14: at Miami Dolphins ====
Week 14: Tennessee Titans at Miami Dolphins – Game summary

Quarter	1	2	3	4	Total
**Titans**	0	10	3	15	**28**
Dolphins	7	0	3	17	**27**

at Hard Rock Stadium, Miami Gardens, Florida

- Date: December 11
- Game time: 8:15 p.m. EST/7:15 p.m. CST
- Game weather: Partly cloudy, 64 °F (18 °C)
- Game attendance: 66,068
- Referee: Adrian Hill
- TV announcers (WTVF/ESPN): Chris Fowler, Louis Riddick, Dan Orlovsky and Laura Rutledge
- Recap, Game Book

Game information

**First quarter**

- MIA – Zach Sieler 5-yard interception return (Jason Sanders kick), 8:25. Dolphins 7–0.

**Second quarter**

- TEN – Derrick Henry 1-yard run (Nick Folk kick), 6:53. Tied 7–7. **Drive: 14 plays, 86 yards, 7:13.**
- TEN – Nick Folk 28-yard field goal, 0:00. Titans 10–7. **Drive: 6 plays, 69 yards, 0:28.**

**Third quarter**

- MIA – Jason Sanders 20-yard field goal, 9:35. Tied 10–10. **Drive: 11 plays, 77 yards, 5:25.**
- TEN – Nick Folk 23-yard field goal, 0:09. Titans 13–10. **Drive: 12 plays, 60 yards, 5:44.**

**Fourth quarter**

- MIA – Jason Sanders 31-yard field goal, 12:37. Tied 13–13. **Drive: 7 plays, 59 yards, 2:32.**
- MIA – Raheem Mostert 3-yard run (Jason Sanders kick), 5:34. Dolphins 20–13. **Drive: 2 plays, 7 yards, 0:33.**
- MIA – Raheem Mostert 5-yard run (Jason Sanders kick), 4:34. Dolphins 27–13. **Drive: 2 plays, 12 yards, 0:54.**
- TEN – DeAndre Hopkins 3-yard pass from Will Levis (Will Levis–Nick Westbrook-Ikhine pass), 2:40. Dolphins 27–21. **Drive: 9 plays, 75 yards, 1:54.**
- TEN – Derrick Henry 3-yard run (Nick Folk kick), 1:49. Titans 28–27. **Drive: 4 plays, 64 yards, 0:26.**

**Top passers**

- TEN – Will Levis – 23/38, 327 yards, TD, INT
- MIA – Tua Tagovailoa – 23/33, 240 yards

**Top rushers**

- TEN – Derrick Henry – 17 rushes, 34 yards, 2 TD
- MIA – Raheem Mostert – 21 rushes, 96 yards, TD

**Top receivers**

- TEN – DeAndre Hopkins – 7 receptions, 124 yards, TD
- MIA – Jaylen Waddle – 6 receptions, 79 yards

==== Week 15: vs. Houston Texans ====
Week 15: Houston Texans at Tennessee Titans – Game summary

Quarter	1	2	3	4	OT	Total
**Texans**	0	3	6	7	3	**19**
Titans	6	7	0	3	0	**16**

at Nissan Stadium, Nashville, Tennessee

- Date: December 17
- Game time: 12:00 p.m. CST
- Game weather: Cloudy, 48 °F (9 °C)
- Game attendance: 66,219
- Referee: Clete Blakeman
- TV announcers (CBS): Spero Dedes, Adam Archuleta and Aditi Kinkhabwala
- Recap, Game Book

Game information

**First quarter**

- TEN – Will Levis 1-yard run (kick failed), 7:09. Titans 6–0. **Drive: 11 plays, 83 yards, 5:46.**

**Second quarter**

- TEN – Elijah Molden 44-yard interception return (Nick Folk kick), 13:56. Titans 13–0. **Drive: 7 plays, 75 yards, 3:55.**
- HOU – Kaʻimi Fairbairn 23-yard field goal, 0:00. Titans 13–3. **Drive: 13 plays, 52 yards, 5:38.**

**Third quarter**

- HOU – Kaʻimi Fairbairn 27-yard field goal, 6:27. Titans 13–6. **Drive: 10 plays, 51 yards, 5:50.**
- HOU – Kaʻimi Fairbairn 53-yard field goal, 2:42. Titans 13–9. **Drive: 4 plays, 11 yards, 1:55.**

**Fourth quarter**

- TEN – Nick Folk 45-yard field goal, 7:28. Titans 16–9. **Drive: 8 plays, 19 yards, 4:45.**
- HOU – Noah Brown 3-yard pass from Case Keenum (Kaʻimi Fairbairn kick), 3:03. Tied 16–16. **Drive: 10 plays, 79 yards, 4:25.**

**Overtime**

- HOU – Kaʻimi Fairbairn 54-yard field goal, 0:00. Texans 19–16. **Drive: 5 plays, 44 yards, 1:43.**

**Top passers**

- HOU – Case Keenum – 23/36, 229 yards, TD, INT
- TEN – Will Levis – 17/26, 199 yards, INT

**Top rushers**

- HOU – Devin Singletary – 26 rushes, 121 yards
- TEN – Tyjae Spears – 9 rushes, 30 yards

**Top receivers**

- HOU – Noah Brown – 8 receptions, 82 yards, TD
- TEN – Treylon Burks – 3 receptions, 62 yards

==== Week 16: vs. Seattle Seahawks ====
Week 16: Seattle Seahawks at Tennessee Titans – Game summary

Quarter	1	2	3	4	Total
**Seahawks**	0	3	3	14	**20**
Titans	0	10	0	7	**17**

at Nissan Stadium, Nashville, Tennessee

- Date: December 24
- Game time: 12:00 p.m. CST
- Game weather: Cloudy, 64 °F (18 °C)
- Game attendance: 60,181
- Referee: Shawn Smith
- TV announcers (CBS): Andrew Catalon, Tiki Barber, Matt Ryan and AJ Ross
- Recap, Game Book

Game information

**First quarter**

- No scoring plays.

**Second quarter**

- TEN – Chig Okonkwo 12-yard pass from Derrick Henry (Nick Folk kick), 14:14. Titans 7–0. **Drive: 6 plays, 57 yards, 3:10.**
- SEA – Jason Myers 28-yard field goal, 10:48. Titans 7–3. **Drive: 7 plays, 60 yards, 3:26.**
- TEN – Nick Folk 33-yard field goal, 3:18. Titans 10–3. **Drive: 12 plays, 60 yards, 7:30.**

**Third quarter**

- SEA – Jason Myers 27-yard field goal, 9:53. Titans 10–6. **Drive: 10 plays, 46 yards, 5:07.**

**Fourth quarter**

- SEA – DK Metcalf 11-yard pass from Geno Smith (Jason Myers kick), 12:10. Seahawks 13–10. **Drive: 10 plays, 96 yards, 6:33.**
- TEN – Derrick Henry 2-yard run (Nick Folk kick), 3:21. Titans 17–13. **Drive: 15 plays, 75 yards, 8:49.**
- SEA – Colby Parkinson 5-yard pass from Geno Smith (Jason Myers kick), 0:57. Seahawks 20–17. **Drive: 14 plays, 75 yards, 2:24.**

**Top passers**

- SEA – Geno Smith – 25/36, 227 yards, 2 TD
- TEN – Ryan Tannehill – 18/26, 152 yards

**Top rushers**

- SEA – Kenneth Walker III – 16 rushes, 54 yards
- TEN – Derrick Henry – 19 rushes, 88 yards, TD

**Top receivers**

- SEA – Tyler Lockett – 8 receptions, 81 yards
- TEN – Chig Okonkwo – 6 receptions, 63 yards, TD

==== Week 17: at Houston Texans ====
Week 17: Tennessee Titans at Houston Texans – Game summary

Quarter	1	2	3	4	Total
Titans	0	3	0	0	**3**
**Texans**	3	17	3	3	**26**

at NRG Stadium, Houston, Texas

- Date: December 31
- Game time: 12:00 p.m. CST
- Game weather: None (retractable roof closed)
- Game attendance: 71,517
- Referee: Scott Novak
- TV announcers (Fox): Chris Myers, Robert Smith and Jen Hale
- Recap, Game Book

Game information

**First quarter**

- HOU – Kaʻimi Fairbairn 28-yard field goal, 7:17. Texans 3–0. **Drive: 13 plays, 58 yards, 6:47.**

**Second quarter**

- HOU – Brevin Jordan 12-yard pass from C. J. Stroud (Kaʻimi Fairbairn kick), 10:10. Texans 10–0. **Drive: 13 plays, 94 yards, 7:30.**
- HOU – Sheldon Rankins 13-yard fumble return (Kaʻimi Fairbairn kick), 10:02. Texans 17–0.
- HOU – Kaʻimi Fairbairn 38-yard field goal, 4:17. Texans 20–0. **Drive: 7 plays, 44 yards, 2:58.**
- TEN – Nick Folk 53-yard field goal, 0:00. Texans 20–3. **Drive: 6 plays, 43 yards, 1:11.**

**Third quarter**

- HOU – Kaʻimi Fairbairn 27-yard field goal, 9:35. Texans 23–3. **Drive: 12 plays, 71 yards, 5:25.**

**Fourth quarter**

- HOU – Kaʻimi Fairbairn 51-yard field goal, 5:33. Texans 26–3. **Drive: 4 plays, 2 yards, 2:03.**

**Top passers**

- TEN – Ryan Tannehill – 16/20, 168 yards
- HOU – C. J. Stroud – 24/32, 213 yards, TD

**Top rushers**

- TEN – Derrick Henry – 12 rushes, 42 yards
- HOU – Devin Singletary – 16 rushes, 80 yards

**Top receivers**

- TEN – DeAndre Hopkins – 7 receptions, 72 yards
- HOU – Nico Collins – 7 receptions, 80 yards

==== Week 18: vs. Jacksonville Jaguars ====
Week 18: Jacksonville Jaguars at Tennessee Titans – Game summary

Quarter	1	2	3	4	Total
Jaguars	3	10	0	7	**20**
**Titans**	7	14	7	0	**28**

at Nissan Stadium, Nashville, Tennessee

- Date: January 7
- Game time: 12:00 p.m. CST
- Game weather: Cloudy, 41 °F (5 °C)
- Game attendance: 63,744
- Referee: Tra Blake
- TV announcers (CBS): Kevin Harlan, Trent Green and Melanie Collins
- Recap, Game Book

Game information

**First quarter**

- JAX – Brandon McManus 44-yard field goal, 9:45. Jaguars 3–0. **Drive: 11 plays, 49 yards, 5:15.**
- TEN – Tyjae Spears 28-yard pass from Ryan Tannehill (Nick Folk kick), 5:57. Titans 7–3. **Drive: 7 plays, 75 yards, 3:48.**

**Second quarter**

- JAX – Calvin Ridley 59-yard pass from Trevor Lawrence (Brandon McManus kick), 12:24. Jaguars 10–7. **Drive: 7 plays, 88 yards, 4:30.**
- TEN – Derrick Henry 18-yard run (Nick Folk kick), 8:27. Titans 14–10. **Drive: 8 plays, 75 yards, 3:57.**
- TEN – Tyjae Spears 3-yard run (Nick Folk kick), 3:03. Titans 21–10. **Drive: 6 plays, 36 yards, 3:30.**
- JAX – Brandon McManus 30-yard field goal, 0:00. Titans 21–13. **Drive: 4 plays, 17 yards, 0:22.**

**Third quarter**

- TEN – DeAndre Hopkins 6-yard pass from Ryan Tannehill (Nick Folk kick), 12:45. Titans 28–13. **Drive: 4 plays, 75 yards, 2:15.**

**Fourth quarter**

- JAX – Evan Engram 14-yard pass from Trevor Lawrence (Brandon McManus kick), 14:55. Titans 28–20. **Drive: 10 plays, 63 yards, 5:13.**

**Top passers**

- JAX – Trevor Lawrence – 29/43, 280 yards, 2 TD, 2 INT
- TEN – Ryan Tannehill – 17/26, 283 yards, 2 TD, INT

**Top rushers**

- JAX – Travis Etienne – 16 rushes, 57 yards
- TEN – Derrick Henry – 19 rushes, 153 yards, TD

**Top receivers**

- JAX – Calvin Ridley – 6 receptions, 106 yards, TD
- TEN – DeAndre Hopkins – 7 receptions, 46 yards, TD

=== Standings ===
==== Division ====
AFC South
	W	L	T	PCT	DIV	CONF	PF	PA	STK
^{(4)} Houston Texans	10	7	0	.588	4–2	7–5	377	353	W2
Jacksonville Jaguars	9	8	0	.529	4–2	6–6	377	371	L1
Indianapolis Colts	9	8	0	.529	3–3	7–5	396	415	L1
Tennessee Titans	6	11	0	.353	1–5	4–8	305	367	W1

==== Conference ====
AFC
#	Team	Division	W	L	T	PCT	DIV	CONF	SOS	SOV	STK
**Division leaders**
1	Baltimore Ravens	North	13	4	0	.765	3–3	8–4	.543	.529	L1
2 (Note: Buffalo claimed the No. 2 seed over Kansas City based on head-to-head victory.) (Note: Buffalo finished ahead of Miami in the AFC East based on head-to-head sweep.)	Buffalo Bills	East	11	6	0	.647	4–2	7–5	.471	.471	W5
3	Kansas City Chiefs	West	11	6	0	.647	4–2	9–3	.481	.428	W2
4	Houston Texans	South	10	7	0	.588	4–2	7–5	.474	.465	W2
**Wild cards**
5 (Note: Cleveland claimed the No. 5 seed over Miami based on conference record.)	Cleveland Browns	North	11	6	0	.647	3–3	8–4	.536	.513	L1
6	Miami Dolphins	East	11	6	0	.647	4–2	7–5	.450	.358	L2
7	Pittsburgh Steelers	North	10	7	0	.588	5–1	7–5	.540	.571	W3
**Did not qualify for the postseason**
8 (Note: Cincinnati finished ahead of Jacksonville based on head-to-head victory. Division tie break was initially used to eliminate Indianapolis (see below).)	Cincinnati Bengals	North	9	8	0	.529	1–5	4–8	.574	.536	W1
9 (Note: Jacksonville finished ahead of Indianapolis based on head-to-head sweep.)	Jacksonville Jaguars	South	9	8	0	.529	4–2	6–6	.533	.477	L1
10	Indianapolis Colts	South	9	8	0	.529	3–3	7–5	.491	.444	L1
11 (Note: Las Vegas finished ahead of Denver based on head-to-head sweep.)	Las Vegas Raiders	West	8	9	0	.471	4–2	6–6	.488	.426	W1
12	Denver Broncos	West	8	9	0	.471	3–3	5–7	.488	.485	L1
13	New York Jets	East	7	10	0	.412	2–4	4–8	.502	.454	W1
14	Tennessee Titans	South	6	11	0	.353	1–5	4–8	.522	.422	W1
15	Los Angeles Chargers	West	5	12	0	.294	1–5	3–9	.529	.388	L5
16	New England Patriots	East	4	13	0	.235	2–4	4–8	.522	.529	L2
**Tiebreakers** (Note: When breaking ties for three or more teams under the NFL's rules, they are first broken within divisions, then comparing only the highest ranked remaining team from each division.)
