= 2023 Jacksonville Jaguars season =

29th season in franchise history

- Owner: Shahid Khan
- General manager: Trent Baalke
- Head coach: Doug Pederson
- Offensive coordinator: Press Taylor
- Defensive coordinator: Mike Caldwell
- Home stadium: EverBank Stadium

Results
- Record: 9–8
- Division place: 2nd AFC South
- Playoffs: Did not qualify
- All-Pros: LS Ross Matiscik (1st team)
- Pro Bowlers: OLB Josh Allen; TE Evan Engram; LS Ross Matiscik

Uniform
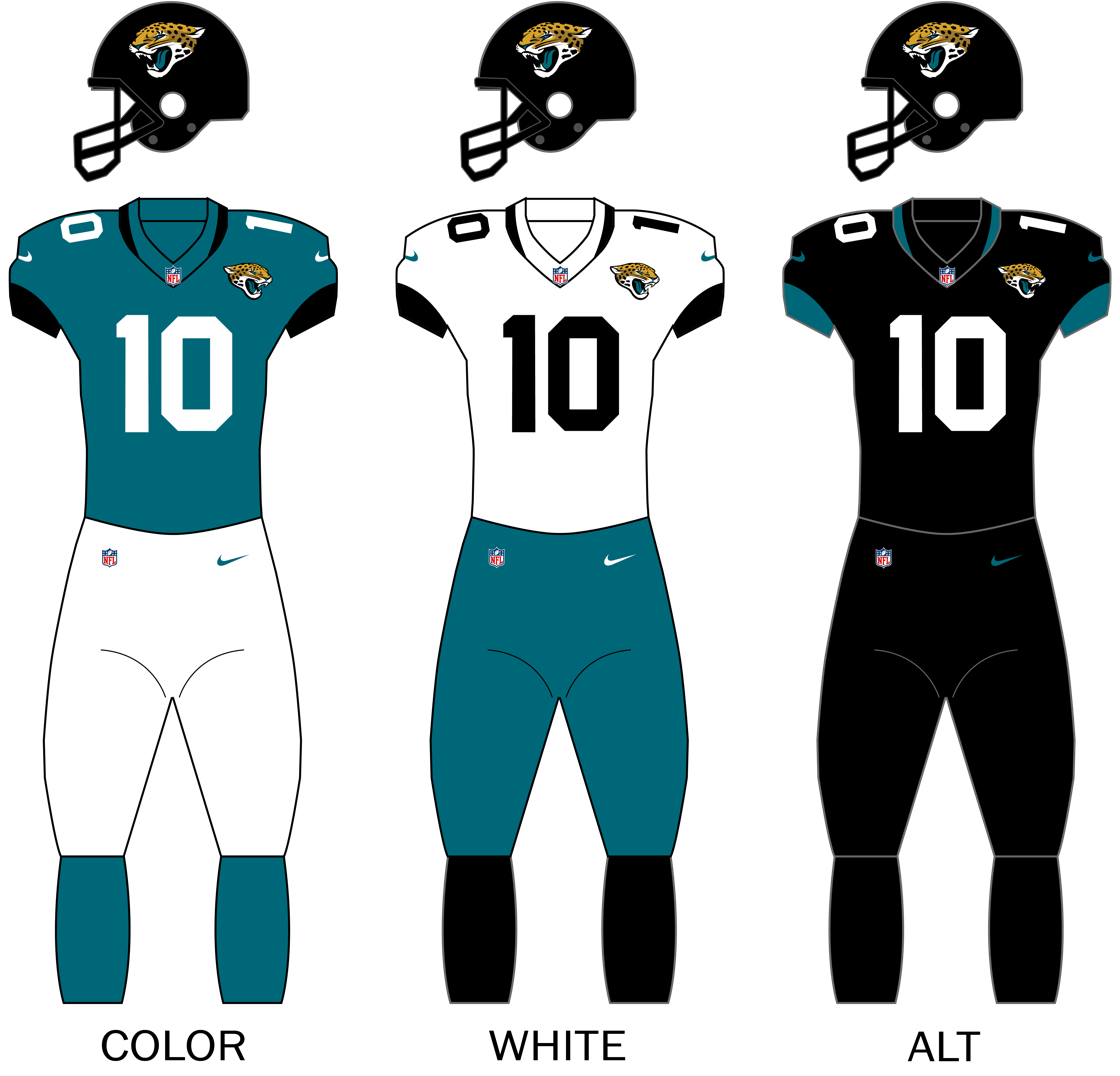

The 2023 season was the Jacksonville Jaguars' 29th season in the National Football League (NFL), their third full season under the leadership of general manager Trent Baalke and their second under head coach Doug Pederson. With a Week 17 win over the Carolina Panthers, they matched their nine-win record from 2022.

Despite being favorites to win what was perceived as a historically weak division and starting the season with an 8–3 record, Jacksonville suffered a late-season collapse, in part due to starting quarterback Trevor Lawrence playing through an injury sustained in the week 13 loss against the Bengals. The offense also took a hit down the stretch when wide receiver Christian Kirk suffered a season-ending injury early in the game against the Bengals. Jacksonville would go on to lose five of their final six games, losing out on the AFC South division title and playoffs after a loss to the division rival Titans, leaving their overperforming rivals, the Indianapolis Colts and Houston Texans, in control of each other's destiny. With the Texans winning their final game against the Colts, Jacksonville ended the season in disappointment.

On June 23, the Jaguars announced the team's home stadium would be renamed EverBank Stadium prior to the start of the season.

In Week 15, the Jaguars faced the Baltimore Ravens at home on Sunday Night Football, this was the Jaguars' first appearance on Sunday Night Football since 2008.

== Offseason ==
=== NFL draft ===
2023 Jacksonville Jaguars draft selections
Round	Pick	Player	Position	College	Notes
1	24	Traded to the New York Giants (Note: The Jaguars traded a first-round selection (24th overall) to the New York Giants in exchange for first-, fifth- and seventh-round selections (25th, 160th and 240th).)			
1	25	Traded to the Buffalo Bills (Note: The Jaguars traded a first-round selection (25th overall) to the Buffalo Bills in exchange for first- and fourth-round selections (27th and 130th overall).)			From Giants
1	27	Anton Harrison	OT	Oklahoma	
2	56	Traded to the Chicago Bears (Note: The Jaguars traded a second-round selection (56th overall) to the Chicago Bears in exchange for second- and fifth-round selections (61st and 136th overall).)			
2	61	Brenton Strange	TE	Penn State	From Bears
3	88	Tank Bigsby	RB	Auburn	
4	121	Ventrell Miller	LB	Florida	From Buccaneers (Note: The Jaguars traded 2022 fifth- and seventh-round selections (157th and 235th overall) to the Tampa Bay Buccaneers in exchange for a fourth-round selection (121st overall).)
4	127	Traded to the New Orleans Saints (Note: The Jaguars traded a fourth-round selection (127th overall) to the New Orleans Saints in exchange for a seventh-round selection (227th overall) and a 2024 fourth-round selection.)			
4	130	Tyler Lacy	DE	Oklahoma State	From Bills
5	136	Yasir Abdullah	LB	Louisville	From Bears
5	159	Traded to the Atlanta Falcons (Note: The Jaguars traded a conditional sixth-round selection and a conditional 2024 fourth-round selection to the Atlanta Falcons in exchange for WR Calvin Ridley. The 2023 pick became a fifth-rounder once Ridley was reinstated on March 6, 2023.)			
5	160	Antonio Johnson	S	Texas A&M	From Giants
6	185	Parker Washington	WR	Penn State	From Jets (Note: The Jaguars traded RB James Robinson to the New York Jets in exchange for a sixth-round selection (185th overall).)
6	202	Christian Braswell	CB	Rutgers	
6	208	Erick Hallett	S	Pittsburgh	From Eagles (Note: The Jaguars traded CB Josiah Scott to the Philadelphia Eagles in exchange for a sixth-round selection (208th overall) and CB Jameson Houston.)
7	226	Cooper Hodges	G	Appalachian State	From Panthers (Note: The Jaguars traded WR Laviska Shenault to the Carolina Panthers in exchange for a seventh-round selection (226th overall) and a 2024 sixth-round selection.)
7	227	Raymond Vohasek	DT	North Carolina	From Saints
7	240	Derek Parish	FB	Houston	From Giants
7	242	Traded to the Green Bay Packers (Note: The Jaguars traded a seventh-round selection (242nd overall) to the Green Bay Packers in exchange for G Cole Van Lanen.)			

Draft trades

=== Undrafted free agents ===
2023 Jacksonville Jaguars undrafted free agents
Name	Position	College	Ref.
Jayson Ademilola	DT	Notre Dame	
DJ Coleman	OLB	Missouri	
Elijah Cooks	WR	San Jose State	
Kaleb Hayes	CB	BYU	
Dequan Jackson	LB	Colorado State	
Samuel Jackson	OT	UCF	
Jaray Jenkins	WR	LSU	
Oliver Martin	WR	Nebraska	
Leonard Taylor	S	Cincinnati	
Divaad Wilson	CB	UCF	

== Staff ==
2023 Jacksonville Jaguars staff
Front office: Owner – Shahid Khan; President – Mark Lamping; General manager – Trent Baalke; Assistant general manager – Ethan Waugh; Director of college scouting – Michael Davis; Director of player personnel – Regis Eller; Director of pro personnel – DeJuan Polk; Player personnel coordinator – Drew Hughes; Director of roster management – Trip MacCracken; Chief football strategy officer – Tony Khan; Head coaches: Head coach – Doug Pederson; Offensive coaches: Offensive coordinator – Press Taylor; Passing game coordinator – Nick Holz; Quarterbacks – Mike McCoy; Assistant quarterbacks – Andrew Breiner; Running backs – Bernie Parmalee; Wide receivers – Chad Hall; Assistant wide receivers – Tyler Tettleton; Tight ends – Richard Angulo; Offensive line – Phil Rauscher; Assistant offensive line – Todd Washington; Offensive quality control – Greg Austin; Offensive quality control – Nick Williams	Defensive coaches: Defensive coordinator – Mike Caldwell; Senior defensive assistant – Bob Sutton; Defensive line – Brentson Buckner; Assistant defensive line – Rory Segrest; Outside linebackers – Bill Shuey; Inside linebackers – Tony Gilbert; Passing game coordinator/cornerbacks – Deshea Townsend; Safeties – Cody Grimm; Defensive quality control – Sean Cullina; Defensive quality control – Tee Mitchell; Defensive quality control – Patrick Reilly; Special teams coaches: Special teams coordinator – Heath Farwell; Assistant special teams coordinator – Luke Thompson; Strength and conditioning: Head strength and conditioning coach – Cedric Scott; Assistant strength and conditioning coach – Adam Potts; Assistant strength and conditioning coach – Brandon Ireland; Assistant strength and conditioning coach – Kevin Maxen

== Final roster ==
2023 Jacksonville Jaguars roster
Quarterbacks (QB): 19 Matt Barkley; 3 C. J. Beathard; 16 Trevor Lawrence; Running backs (RB): 4 Tank Bigsby; 1 Travis Etienne; 25 D'Ernest Johnson; Wide receivers (WR): 14 Elijah Cooks; 15 Tim Jones; 7 Zay Jones; 13 Christian Kirk; 0 Calvin Ridley; 11 Parker Washington; Tight ends (TE): 17 Evan Engram; 89 Luke Farrell; 85 Brenton Strange	Offensive linemen (OL): 76 Ezra Cleveland G/T; 79 Luke Fortner C; 73 Blake Hance G; 77 Anton Harrison T; 72 Walker Little T/G; 74 Cam Robinson T; 68 Brandon Scherff G; 69 Tyler Shatley G/C; 70 Cole Van Lanen G/T; Defensive linemen (DL): 90 Angelo Blackson DE; 94 Folorunso Fatukasi NT; 96 Adam Gotsis DE; 52 DaVon Hamilton NT; 93 Tyler Lacy DE; 98 Jeremiah Ledbetter DE; 95 Roy Robertson-Harris DE	Linebackers (LB): 56 Yasir Abdullah OLB; 41 Josh Allen OLB; 45 K'Lavon Chaisson OLB; 57 Caleb Johnson ILB; 33 Devin Lloyd ILB; 48 Chad Muma ILB; 23 Foyesade Oluokun ILB; 50 Shaquille Quarterman ILB; 91 Dawuane Smoot OLB; 44 Travon Walker OLB; Defensive backs (DB): 30 Montaric Brown CB; 32 Tyson Campbell CB; 5 Andre Cisco FS; 6 Chris Claybrooks CB (Exempt); 37 Tre Herndon CB; 2 Rayshawn Jenkins SS; 26 Antonio Johnson SS; 34 Gregory Junior CB; 42 Andrew Wingard FS; 31 Darious Williams CB; Special teams (ST): 9 Logan Cooke P; 46 Ross Matiscik LS; 10 Brandon McManus K	Practice squad: 67 Chandler Brewer G/T; 29 Tevaughn Campbell CB; 54 DJ Coleman DE; 24 Snoop Conner RB; 47 De'Shaan Dixon OLB; 40 Erick Hallett FS; 83 Jacob Harris WR; 55 Dequan Jackson ILB; 90 Henry Mondeaux DE (PS/I); 64 Jimmy Murray C; 27 Amani Oruwariye CB; 92 Esezi Otomewo DE; 35 Ayo Oyelola SS (IPP); 87 Josh Pederson TE; 6 E. J. Perry QB; 78 Keaton Sutherland G; 60 Darryl Williams C; 81 Seth Williams WR; Reserve: 39 Jamal Agnew WR (IR); 21 Christian Braswell CB (IR); 75 Cooper Hodges G/T (IR); 51 Ventrell Miller ILB (IR); 82 Jaylon Moore WR (IR); 20 Daniel Thomas SS (IR); Rookies in italics 53 active (1 exempt), 6 reserve, 16 practice squad (2 exempt)

== Preseason ==
Week	Date	Opponent	Result	Record	Venue	Recap
1	August 12	at Dallas Cowboys	W 28–23	1–0	AT&T Stadium	Recap
2	August 19	at Detroit Lions	W 25–7	2–0	Ford Field	Recap
3	August 26 (Note: Due to an injury involving Daewood Davis, the game was suspended with around eight minutes to go in the fourth quarter.)	Miami Dolphins	W 31–18	3–0	EverBank Stadium	Recap

== Regular season ==
=== Schedule ===
During the 2023 season, the Jaguars became the first team to play two games in London in a single season. They played against the Atlanta Falcons at Wembley Stadium in Week 4, and the Buffalo Bills at Tottenham Hotspur Stadium in Week 5.

Week	Date	Opponent	Result	Record	Venue	Recap
1	September 10	at **Indianapolis Colts**	**W** 31–21	1–0	Lucas Oil Stadium	Recap
2	September 17	Kansas City Chiefs	**L** 9–17	1–1	EverBank Stadium	Recap
3	September 24	**Houston Texans**	**L** 17–37	1–2	EverBank Stadium	Recap
4	October 1	Atlanta Falcons	**W** 23–7	2–2	(United Kingdom) Wembley Stadium (London)	Recap
5	October 8	at Buffalo Bills	**W** 25–20	3–2	(United Kingdom) Tottenham Hotspur Stadium (London)	Recap
6	October 15	**Indianapolis Colts**	**W** 37–20	4–2	EverBank Stadium	Recap
7	October 19	at New Orleans Saints	**W** 31–24	5–2	Caesars Superdome	Recap
8	October 29	at Pittsburgh Steelers	**W** 20–10	6–2	Acrisure Stadium	Recap
9	Bye					
10	November 12	San Francisco 49ers	**L** 3–34	6–3	EverBank Stadium	Recap
11	November 19	**Tennessee Titans**	**W** 34–14	7–3	EverBank Stadium	Recap
12	November 26	at **Houston Texans**	**W** 24–21	8–3	NRG Stadium	Recap
13	December 4	Cincinnati Bengals	**L** 31–34 (OT)	8–4	EverBank Stadium	Recap
14	December 10	at Cleveland Browns	**L** 27–31	8–5	Cleveland Browns Stadium	Recap
15	December 17	Baltimore Ravens	**L** 7–23	8–6	EverBank Stadium	Recap
16	December 24	at Tampa Bay Buccaneers	**L** 12–30	8–7	Raymond James Stadium	Recap
17	December 31	Carolina Panthers	**W** 26–0	9–7	EverBank Stadium	Recap
18	January 7	at **Tennessee Titans**	**L** 20–28	9–8	Nissan Stadium	Recap

Note: Intra-division opponents are in bold text.

=== Game summaries ===
==== Week 1: at Indianapolis Colts ====
Week One: Jacksonville Jaguars at Indianapolis Colts – Game summary

Quarter	1	2	3	4	Total
**Jaguars**	7	7	3	14	**31**
Colts	0	7	14	0	**21**

at Lucas Oil Stadium, Indianapolis, Indiana

- Date: September 10
- Game time: 1:00 p.m. EDT
- Game weather: None (retractable roof closed)
- Game attendance: 65,749
- Referee: Clay Martin
- TV announcers (Fox): Kenny Albert, Jonathan Vilma and Shannon Spake
- Recap, Game Book

Game information

**First quarter**

- JAX – Calvin Ridley 9-yard pass from Trevor Lawrence (Brandon McManus kick), 5:18. Jaguars 7–0. **Drive: 9 plays, 61 yards, 5:07.**

**Second quarter**

- IND – Anthony Richardson 2-yard run (Matt Gay kick), 14:57. Tied 7–7. **Drive: 11 plays, 75 yards, 5:21.**
- JAX – Zay Jones 18-yard pass from Trevor Lawrence (Brandon McManus kick), 4:56. Jaguars 14–7. **Drive: 7 plays, 57 yards, 3:55.**

**Third quarter**

- IND – Michael Pittman Jr. 39-yard pass from Anthony Richardson (Matt Gay kick), 11:25. Tied 14–14. **Drive: 6 plays, 63 yards, 2:35.**
- JAX – Brandon McManus 45-yard field goal, 8:31. Jaguars 17–14. **Drive: 8 plays, 48 yards, 2:54.**
- IND – DeForest Buckner 26–yard fumble return (Matt Gay kick), 2:27. Colts 21–17.

**Fourth quarter**

- JAX – Tank Bigsby 1-yard run (Brandon McManus kick), 5:14. Jaguars 24–21. **Drive: 10 plays, 46 yards, 5:32.**
- JAX – Travis Etienne 26-yard run (Brandon McManus kick), 4:08. Jaguars 31–21. **Drive: 3 plays, 44 yards, 0:52.**

**Top passers**

- JAX – Trevor Lawrence – 24/32, 241 yards, 2 TD, INT
- IND – Anthony Richardson – 24/37, 223 yards, TD, INT

**Top rushers**

- JAX – Travis Etienne – 18 rushes, 77 yards, TD
- IND – Anthony Richardson – 10 rushes, 40 yards, TD

**Top receivers**

- JAX – Calvin Ridley – 8 receptions, 101 yards, TD
- IND – Michael Pittman Jr. – 8 receptions, 97 yards, TD

==== Week 2: vs. Kansas City Chiefs ====
Week Two: Kansas City Chiefs at Jacksonville Jaguars – Game summary

Quarter	1	2	3	4	Total
**Chiefs**	0	7	7	3	**17**
Jaguars	0	6	0	3	**9**

at EverBank Stadium, Jacksonville, Florida

- Date: September 17
- Game time: 1:00 p.m. EDT
- Game weather: 87 °F (31 °C)
- Game attendance: 69,615
- Referee: Adrian Hill
- TV announcers (CBS): Ian Eagle, Charles Davis and Evan Washburn
- Recap, Game Book

Game information

**First quarter**

- No scoring plays.

**Second quarter**

- JAX – Brandon McManus 32-yard field goal, 12:59. Jaguars 3–0. **Drive: 4 plays, 3 yards, 1:52.**
- KC – Skyy Moore 9-yard pass from Patrick Mahomes (Harrison Butker kick), 0:27. Chiefs 7–3. **Drive: 7 plays, 50 yards, 3:37.**
- JAX – Brandon McManus 49-yard field goal, 0:00. Chiefs 7–6. **Drive: 5 plays, 44 yards, 0:27.**

**Third quarter**

- KC – Travis Kelce 9-yard pass from Patrick Mahomes (Harrison Butker kick), 11:30. Chiefs 14–6. **Drive: 7 plays, 81 yards, 3:30.**

**Fourth quarter**

- JAX – Brandon McManus 22-yard field goal, 13:43. Chiefs 14–9. **Drive: 9 plays, 73 yards, 3:16.**
- KC – Harrison Butker 38-yard field goal, 8:10. Chiefs 17–9. **Drive: 13 plays, 55 yards, 5:33.**

**Top passers**

- KC – Patrick Mahomes – 29/41, 305 yards, 2 TD, INT
- JAX – Trevor Lawrence – 22/41, 216 yards

**Top rushers**

- KC – Isiah Pacheco – 12 rushes, 70 yards
- JAX – Travis Etienne – 12 rushes, 40 yards

**Top receivers**

- KC – Skyy Moore – 8 receptions, 70 yards, TD
- JAX – Christian Kirk – 11 receptions, 110 yards

==== Week 3: vs. Houston Texans ====
Week Three: Houston Texans at Jacksonville Jaguars – Game summary

Quarter	1	2	3	4	Total
**Texans**	7	10	7	13	**37**
Jaguars	0	0	10	7	**17**

at EverBank Stadium, Jacksonville, Florida

- Date: September 24
- Game time: 1:00 p.m. EDT
- Game weather: 84 °F (29 °C)
- Game attendance: 61,466
- Referee: Scott Novak
- TV announcers (Fox): Chris Myers, Robert Smith and Jen Hale
- Recap, Game Book

Game information

**First quarter**

- HOU – Dameon Pierce 1-yard run (Kaʻimi Fairbairn kick), 7:35. Texans 7–0. **Drive: 7 plays, 62 yards, 3:57.**

**Second quarter**

- HOU – Brevin Jordan 4-yard pass from C. J. Stroud (Kaʻimi Fairbairn kick), 7:27. Texans 14–0. **Drive: 7 plays, 41 yards, 4:24.**
- HOU – Kaʻimi Fairbairn 28-yard field goal, 0:00. Texans 17–0. **Drive: 9 plays, 56 yards, 1:04.**

**Third quarter**

- JAX – Tank Bigsby 1-yard run (Brandon McManus kick), 11:17. Texans 17–7. **Drive: 7 plays, 67 yards, 3:43.**
- JAX – Brandon McManus 33-yard field goal, 4:35. Texans 17–10. **Drive: 8 plays, 53 yards, 4:44.**
- HOU – Andrew Beck 85-yard kickoff return (Kaʻimi Fairbairn kick), 4:19. Texans 24–10.

**Fourth quarter**

- HOU – Kaʻimi Fairbairn 26-yard field goal, 12:36. Texans 27–10. **Drive: 10 plays, 41 yards, 4:44.**
- JAX – Christian Kirk 26-yard pass from Trevor Lawrence (Brandon McManus kick), 10:40. Texans 27–17. **Drive: 6 plays, 75 yards, 1:56.**
- HOU – Tank Dell 68-yard pass from C. J. Stroud (Kaʻimi Fairbairn kick), 8:59. Texans 34–17. **Drive: 3 plays, 75 yards, 1:41.**
- HOU – Kaʻimi Fairbairn 33-yard field goal, 2:10. Texans 37–17. **Drive: 7 plays, 29 yards, 4:35.**

**Top passers**

- HOU – C. J. Stroud – 20/30, 280 yards, 2 TD
- JAX – Trevor Lawrence – 27/40, 279 yards, TD, INT

**Top rushers**

- HOU – Devin Singletary – 9 rushes, 41 yards
- JAX – Travis Etienne – 19 rushes, 88 yards

**Top receivers**

- HOU – Tank Dell – 5 receptions, 145 yards, TD
- JAX – Evan Engram – 7 receptions, 67 yards

==== Week 4: vs. Atlanta Falcons ====
NFL London games

Week Four: Atlanta Falcons at Jacksonville Jaguars – Game summary

Quarter	1	2	3	4	Total
Falcons	0	0	7	0	**7**
**Jaguars**	7	10	0	6	**23**

at Wembley Stadium, London, England

- Date: October 1
- Game time: 2:30 p.m. BST/9:30 a.m. EDT
- Game weather: Cloudy, 72 °F (22 °C)
- Game attendance: 85,716
- Referee: Craig Wrolstad
- TV announcers (ESPN+): Chris Fowler, Louis Riddick, Dan Orlovsky and Laura Rutledge
- Recap, Game Book

Game information

**First quarter**

- JAX – Calvin Ridley 30-yard pass from Trevor Lawrence (Brandon McManus kick), 5:44. Jaguars 7–0. **Drive: 8 plays, 72 yards, 3:49.**

**Second quarter**

- JAX – Brandon McManus 56-yard field goal, 14:51. Jaguars 10–0. **Drive: 8 plays, 46 yards, 3:32.**
- JAX – Darious Williams 61-yard interception return (Brandon McManus kick), 4:31. Jaguars 17–0.

**Third quarter**

- ATL – Drake London 15-yard pass from Desmond Ridder (Younghoe Koo kick), 11:38. Jaguars 17–7. **Drive: 8 plays, 75 yards, 3:22.**

**Fourth quarter**

- JAX – Brandon McManus 43-yard field goal, 10:36. Jaguars 20–7. **Drive: 13 plays, 65 yards, 7:21.**
- JAX – Brandon McManus 38-yard field goal, 1:56. Jaguars 23–7. **Drive: 10 plays, 74 yards, 4:05.**

**Top passers**

- ATL – Desmond Ridder – 19/31, 191 yards, TD, 2 INT
- JAX – Trevor Lawrence – 23/30, 207 yards, TD

**Top rushers**

- ATL – Bijan Robinson – 14 rushes, 105 yards
- JAX – Travis Etienne – 20 rushes, 55 yards

**Top receivers**

- ATL – Jonnu Smith – 6 receptions, 95 yards
- JAX – Christian Kirk – 8 receptions, 84 yards

==== Week 5: at Buffalo Bills ====
NFL London games

Week Five: Jacksonville Jaguars at Buffalo Bills – Game summary

Quarter	1	2	3	4	Total
**Jaguars**	11	0	0	14	**25**
Bills	0	7	0	13	**20**

at Tottenham Hotspur Stadium, London, England

- Date: October 8
- Game time: 2:30 p.m. BST/9:30 a.m. EDT
- Game weather: Partly cloudy, 75 °F (24 °C)
- Game attendance: 61,273
- Referee: Shawn Smith
- TV announcers (NFLN): Rich Eisen, Kurt Warner and Jamie Erdahl
- Recap, Game Book

Game information

**First quarter**

- JAX – Zay Jones 6-yard pass from Trevor Lawrence (Travis Etienne run), 6:59. Jaguars 8–0. **Drive: 9 plays, 73 yards, 4:10.**
- JAX – Brandon McManus 44-yard field goal, 1:13. Jaguars 11–0. **Drive: 9 plays, 44 yards, 3:50.**

**Second quarter**

- BUF – Stefon Diggs 15-yard pass from Josh Allen (Tyler Bass kick), 1:14. Jaguars 11–7. **Drive: 11 plays, 86 yards, 4:30.**

**Third quarter**

- No scoring plays.

**Fourth quarter**

- JAX – Travis Etienne 6-yard run (Brandon McManus kick), 7:44. Jaguars 18–7. **Drive: 10 plays, 93 yards, 5:22.**
- BUF – Gabe Davis 19-yard pass from Josh Allen (pass failed), 4:03. Jaguars 18–13. **Drive: 9 plays, 75 yards, 3:41.**
- JAX – Travis Etienne 35-yard run (Brandon McManus kick), 2:56. Jaguars 25–13. **Drive: 5 plays, 75 yards, 1:07.**
- BUF – Josh Allen 3-yard run (Brandon McManus kick), 2:11. Jaguars 25–20. **Drive: 4 plays, 75 yards, 0:45.**

**Top passers**

- JAX – Trevor Lawrence – 25/37, 315 yards, TD
- BUF – Josh Allen – 27/40, 359 yards, 2 TD, INT

**Top rushers**

- JAX – Travis Etienne – 26 rushes, 136 yards, 2 TD
- BUF – Josh Allen – 4 rushes, 14 yards, TD

**Top receivers**

- JAX – Calvin Ridley – 7 receptions, 122 yards
- BUF – Stefon Diggs – 8 receptions, 121 yards, TD

==== Week 6: vs. Indianapolis Colts ====
Week Six: Indianapolis Colts at Jacksonville Jaguars – Game summary

Quarter	1	2	3	4	Total
Colts	3	3	0	14	**20**
**Jaguars**	0	21	10	6	**37**

at EverBank Stadium, Jacksonville, Florida

- Date: October 15
- Game time: 1:00 p.m. EDT
- Game weather: 68 °F (20 °C)
- Game attendance: 64,851
- Referee: Alex Kemp
- TV announcers (CBS): Spero Dedes, Adam Archuleta and Amanda Renner
- Recap, Game Book

Game information

**First quarter**

- IND – Matt Gay 28-yard field goal, 6:27. Colts 3–0. **Drive: 16 plays, 65 yards, 8:33.**

**Second quarter**

- JAX – Travis Etienne 2-yard run (Brandon McManus kick), 14:17. Jaguars 7–3. **Drive: 13 plays, 75 yards, 7:10.**
- JAX – Travis Etienne 22-yard run (Brandon McManus kick), 14:01. Jaguars 14–3. **Drive: 1 play, 22 yards, 0:09.**
- JAX – Christian Kirk 29-yard pass from Trevor Lawrence (Brandon McManus kick), 1:40. Jaguars 21–3. **Drive: 9 plays, 65 yards, 2:59.**
- IND – Matt Gay 56-yard field goal, 0:06. Jaguars 21–6. **Drive: 9 plays, 37 yards, 1:34.**

**Third quarter**

- JAX – Brandon McManus 48-yard field goal, 10:44. Jaguars 24–6. **Drive: 4 plays, 9 yards, 1:47.**
- JAX – Brenton Strange 10-yard pass from Trevor Lawrence (Brandon McManus kick), 3:51. Jaguars 31–6. **Drive: 9 plays, 69 yards, 4:42.**

**Fourth quarter**

- IND – Josh Downs 2-yard pass from Gardner Minshew (Matt Gay kick), 14:14. Jaguars 31–13. **Drive: 12 plays, 75 yards, 4:37.**
- IND – Zack Moss 3-yard run (Matt Gay kick), 7:14. Jaguars 31–20. **Drive: 4 plays, 72 yards, 1:28.**
- JAX – Brandon McManus 49-yard field goal, 4:50. Jaguars 34–20. **Drive: 4 plays, 6 yards, 2:24.**
- JAX – Brandon McManus 51-yard field goal, 3:00. Jaguars 37–20. **Drive: 4 plays, -14 yards, 0:19.**

**Top passers**

- IND – Gardner Minshew – 33/55, 329 yards, TD, 3 INT
- JAX – Trevor Lawrence – 20/30, 181 yards, 2 TD, INT

**Top rushers**

- IND – Zack Moss – 7 rushes, 21 yards, TD
- JAX – Travis Etienne – 18 rushes, 55 yards, 2 TD

**Top receivers**

- IND – Michael Pittman Jr. – 9 receptions, 109 yards
- JAX – Christian Kirk – 3 receptions, 49 yards, TD

==== Week 7: at New Orleans Saints ====
Week Seven: Jacksonville Jaguars at New Orleans Saints – Game summary

Quarter	1	2	3	4	Total
**Jaguars**	7	10	7	7	**31**
Saints	3	3	3	15	**24**

at Caesars Superdome, New Orleans, Louisiana

- Date: October 19
- Game time: 8:15 p.m. EDT/7:15 p.m. CDT
- Game weather: None (indoor stadium)
- Game attendance: 70,009
- Referee: Land Clark
- TV announcers (WFOX/Prime Video): Al Michaels, Kirk Herbstreit and Kaylee Hartung
- Recap, Game Book

Game information

**First quarter**

- JAX – Travis Etienne 2-yard run (Brandon McManus kick), 9:44. Jaguars 7–0. **Drive: 10 plays, 75 yards, 5:16.**
- NO – Blake Grupe 23-yard field goal, 1:26. Jaguars 7–3. **Drive: 6 plays, 12 yards, 2:10.**

**Second quarter**

- JAX – Travis Etienne 17-yard run (Brandon McManus kick), 13:09. Jaguars 14–3. **Drive: 7 plays, 75 yards, 3:17.**
- NO – Blake Grupe 35-yard field goal, 1:57. Jaguars 14–6. **Drive: 8 plays, 29 yards, 3:44.**
- JAX – Brandon McManus 43-yard field goal, 0:32. Jaguars 17–6. **Drive: 10 plays, 50 yards, 1:25.**

**Third quarter**

- NO – Blake Grupe 42-yard field goal, 9:49. Jaguars 17–9. **Drive: 11 plays, 52 yards, 5:11.**
- JAX – Foyesade Oluokun 24-yard interception return (Brandon McManus kick), 6:47. Jaguars 24–9.

**Fourth quarter**

- NO – Taysom Hill 1-yard run (Blake Grupe kick), 14:21. Jaguars 24–16. **Drive: 16 plays, 75 yards, 7:26.**
- NO – Michael Thomas 17-yard pass from Derek Carr (pass succeeded), 6:38. Tied 24–24. **Drive: 3 plays, 53 yards, 0:51.**
- JAX – Christian Kirk 44-yard pass from Trevor Lawrence (Brandon McManus kick), 3:08. Jaguars 31–24. **Drive: 2 plays, 46 yards, 0:37.**

**Top passers**

- JAX – Trevor Lawrence – 20/29, 204 yards, TD
- NO – Derek Carr – 33/55, 301 yards, TD, INT

**Top rushers**

- JAX – Trevor Lawrence – 8 rushes, 59 yards
- NO – Alvin Kamara – 17 rushes, 62 yards

**Top receivers**

- JAX – Christian Kirk – 6 receptions, 90 yards, TD
- NO – Alvin Kamara – 12 receptions, 91 yards

==== Week 8: at Pittsburgh Steelers ====
Week Eight: Jacksonville Jaguars at Pittsburgh Steelers – Game summary

Quarter	1	2	3	4	Total
**Jaguars**	6	3	8	3	**20**
Steelers	0	3	7	0	**10**

at Acrisure Stadium, Pittsburgh, Pennsylvania

- Date: October 29
- Game time: 1:00 p.m. EDT
- Game weather: Rain, 58 °F (14 °C)
- Game attendance: 67,225
- Referee: Alan Eck
- TV announcers (CBS): Ian Eagle, Charles Davis and Evan Washburn
- Recap, Game Book

Game information

**First quarter**

- JAX – Brandon McManus 50-yard field goal, 10:47. Jaguars 3–0. **Drive: 6 plays, 21 yards, 3:16.**
- JAX – Brandon McManus 51-yard field goal, 5:54. Jaguars 6–0. **Drive: 7 plays, 36 yards, 3:29.**

**Second quarter**

- PIT – Chris Boswell 22-yard field goal, 3:59. Jaguars 6–3. **Drive: 12 plays, 93 yards, 6:16.**
- JAX – Brandon McManus 38-yard field goal, 1:04. Jaguars 9–3. **Drive: 9 plays, 43 yards, 2:55.**

**Third quarter**

- JAX – Travis Etienne 56-yard pass from Trevor Lawrence (run succeeded), 5:05. Jaguars 17–3. **Drive: 2 plays, 56 yards, 0:13.**
- PIT – George Pickens 22-yard pass from Mitch Trubisky (Chris Boswell kick), 0:53. Jaguars 17–10. **Drive: 8 plays, 75 yards, 4:12.**

**Fourth quarter**

- JAX – Brandon McManus 37-yard field goal, 4:35. Jaguars 20–10. **Drive: 7 plays, 40 yards, 4:45.**

**Top passers**

- JAX – Trevor Lawrence – 24/32, 292 yards, TD, INT
- PIT – Mitch Trubisky – 15/27, 138 yards, TD, 2 INT

**Top rushers**

- JAX – Travis Etienne – 24 rushes, 79 yards
- PIT – Jaylen Warren – 5 rushes, 19 yards

**Top receivers**

- JAX – Evan Engram – 10 receptions, 88 yards
- PIT – Diontae Johnson – 8 receptions, 85 yards

==== Week 10: vs. San Francisco 49ers ====
Week Ten: San Francisco 49ers at Jacksonville Jaguars – Game summary

Quarter	1	2	3	4	Total
**49ers**	10	3	14	7	**34**
Jaguars	0	3	0	0	**3**

at EverBank Stadium, Jacksonville, Florida

- Date: November 12
- Game time: 1:00 p.m. EST
- Game weather: 59 °F (15 °C)
- Game attendance: 69,271
- Referee: Brad Allen
- TV announcers (Fox): Joe Davis, Daryl Johnston and Pam Oliver
- Recap, Game Book

Game information

**First quarter**

- SF – Brandon Aiyuk 13-yard pass from Brock Purdy (Jake Moody kick), 11:34. 49ers 7–0. **Drive: 4 plays, 57 yards, 2:05.**
- SF – Jake Moody 39-yard field goal, 4:21. 49ers 10–0. **Drive: 10 plays, 41 yards, 4:38.**

**Second quarter**

- JAX – Brandon McManus 37-yard field goal, 4:20. 49ers 10–3. **Drive: 14 plays, 80 yards, 7:36.**
- SF – Jake Moody 35-yard field goal, 0:00. 49ers 13–3. **Drive: 11 plays, 61 yards, 4:20.**

**Third quarter**

- SF – George Kittle 66-yard pass from Brock Purdy (Jake Moody kick), 14:10. 49ers 20–3. **Drive: 2 plays, 75 yards, 0:50.**
- SF – Deebo Samuel 23-yard run (Jake Moody kick), 1:20. 49ers 27–3. **Drive: 7 plays, 81 yards, 3:57.**

**Fourth quarter**

- SF – Kyle Juszczyk 22-yard pass from Brock Purdy (Jake Moody kick), 12:40. 49ers 34–3. **Drive: 3 plays, 40 yards, 1:32.**

**Top passers**

- SF – Brock Purdy – 19/26, 296 yards, 3 TD
- JAX – Trevor Lawrence – 17/29, 185 yards, 2 INT

**Top rushers**

- SF – Christian McCaffrey – 16 rushes, 95 yards
- JAX – Travis Etienne – 9 rushes, 35 yards

**Top receivers**

- SF – George Kittle – 3 receptions, 116 yards, TD
- JAX – Christian Kirk – 6 receptions, 104 yards

==== Week 11: vs. Tennessee Titans ====
Week Eleven: Tennessee Titans at Jacksonville Jaguars – Game summary

Quarter	1	2	3	4	Total
Titans	0	0	7	7	**14**
**Jaguars**	7	6	14	7	**34**

at EverBank Stadium, Jacksonville, Florida

- Date: November 19
- Game time: 1:00 p.m. EST
- Game weather: 75 °F (24 °C)
- Game attendance: 67,175
- Referee: Brad Rogers
- TV announcers (CBS): Spero Dedes, Adam Archuleta and Amanda Renner
- Recap, Game Book

Game information

**First quarter**

- JAX – Calvin Ridley 3-yard pass from Trevor Lawrence (Brandon McManus kick), 2:58. Jaguars 7–0. **Drive: 8 plays, 57 yards, 4:43.**

**Second quarter**

- JAX – Brandon McManus 30-yard field goal, 2:43. Jaguars 10–0. **Drive: 11 plays, 77 yards, 6:16.**
- JAX – Brandon McManus 25-yard field goal, 0:14. Jaguars 13–0. **Drive: 11 plays, 65 yards, 1:34.**

**Third quarter**

- JAX – Trevor Lawrence 9-yard run (Brandon McManus kick), 9:12. Jaguars 20–0. **Drive: 9 plays, 73 yards, 5:48.**
- JAX – Calvin Ridley 20-yard pass from Trevor Lawrence (Brandon McManus kick), 3:22. Jaguars 27–0. **Drive: 6 plays, 80 yards, 3:29.**
- TEN – DeAndre Hopkins 43-yard pass from Will Levis (Nick Folk kick), 0:00. Jaguars 27–7. **Drive: 5 plays, 75 yards, 3:22.**

**Fourth quarter**

- JAX – Trevor Lawrence 5-yard run (Brandon McManus kick), 7:28. Jaguars 34–7. **Drive: 9 plays, 36 yards, 5:26.**
- TEN – Jeffery Simmons 2-yard pass from Will Levis (Nick Folk kick), 4:28. Jaguars 34–14. **Drive: 5 plays, 75 yards, 3:00.**

**Top passers**

- TEN – Will Levis – 13/17, 158 yards, 2 TD
- JAX – Trevor Lawrence – 24/32, 262 yards, 2 TD

**Top rushers**

- TEN – Chris Moore – 1 rush, 38 yards
- JAX – Travis Etienne – 14 rushes, 52 yards

**Top receivers**

- SF – DeAndre Hopkins – 4 receptions, 59 yards, TD
- JAX – Calvin Ridley – 7 receptions, 103 yards, 2 TD

==== Week 12: at Houston Texans ====
Week Twelve: Jacksonville Jaguars at Houston Texans – Game summary

Quarter	1	2	3	4	Total
**Jaguars**	3	10	8	3	**24**
Texans	0	7	7	7	**21**

at NRG Stadium, Houston, Texas

- Date: November 26
- Game time: 1:00 p.m. EST/12:00 p.m. CST
- Game weather: None (retractable roof closed)
- Game attendance: 71,324
- Referee: Clay Martin
- TV announcers (CBS): Andrew Catalon, Tiki Barber, Matt Ryan and AJ Ross
- Recap, Game Book

Game information

**First quarter**

- JAX – Brandon McManus 40-yard field goal, 5:54. Jaguars 3–0. **Drive: 12 plays, 65 yards, 5:54.**

**Second quarter**

- JAX – Trevor Lawrence 1-yard run (Brandon McManus kick), 9:43. Jaguars 10–0. **Drive: 8 plays, 68 yards, 4:39.**
- HOU – Tank Dell 7-yard pass from C. J. Stroud (Matt Ammendola kick), 6:37. Jaguars 10–7. **Drive: 5 plays, 75 yards, 3:06.**
- JAX – Brandon McManus 48-yard field goal, 2:24. Jaguars 13–7. **Drive: 8 plays, 45 yards, 4:13.**

**Third quarter**

- HOU – C. J. Stroud 1-yard run (Matt Ammendola kick), 8:10. Texans 14–13. **Drive: 7 plays, 46 yards, 3:39.**
- JAX – Calvin Ridley 1-yard pass from Trevor Lawrence (pass succeeded), 4:29. Jaguars 21–14. **Drive: 8 plays, 75 yards, 3:41.**

**Fourth quarter**

- JAX – Brandon McManus 53-yard field goal, 11:20. Jaguars 24–14. **Drive: 10 plays, 54 yards, 6:13.**
- HOU – Nico Collins 17-yard pass from C. J. Stroud (Matt Ammendola kick), 5:15. Jaguars 24–21. **Drive: 5 plays, 55 yards, 1:50.**

**Top passers**

- JAX – Trevor Lawrence – 23/38, 364 yards, TD, INT
- HOU – C. J. Stroud – 26/36, 304 yards, 2 TD

**Top rushers**

- JAX – Travis Etienne – 20 rushes, 56 yards
- HOU – C. J. Stroud – 6 rushes, 47 yards, TD

**Top receivers**

- JAX – Calvin Ridley – 5 receptions, 89 yards, TD
- HOU – Nico Collins – 7 receptions, 104 yards, TD

==== Week 13: vs. Cincinnati Bengals ====
Week Thirteen: Cincinnati Bengals at Jacksonville Jaguars – Game summary

Quarter	1	2	3	4	OT	Total
**Bengals**	0	14	7	10	3	**34**
Jaguars	7	7	14	3	0	**31**

at EverBank Stadium, Jacksonville, Florida

- Date: December 4
- Game time: 8:15 p.m. EST
- Game weather: 61 °F (16 °C)
- Game attendance: 67,951
- Referee: Scott Novak
- TV announcers (ESPN/ABC): Joe Buck, Troy Aikman and Lisa Salters
- Recap, Game Book

Game information

**First quarter**

- JAX – Travis Etienne 4-yard run (Brandon McManus kick), 6:51. Jaguars 7–0. **Drive: 7 plays, 51 yards, 3:49.**

**Second quarter**

- CIN – Joe Mixon 6-yard run (Evan McPherson kick), 12:24. Tied 7–7. **Drive: 8 plays, 92 yards, 3:52.**
- JAX – Evan Engram 22-yard pass from Trevor Lawrence (Brandon McManus kick), 6:24. Jaguars 14–7. **Drive: 10 plays, 75 yards, 6:00.**
- CIN – Joe Mixon 2-yard run (Evan McPherson kick), 1:04. Tied 14–14. **Drive: 12 plays, 75 yards, 5:20.**

**Third quarter**

- CIN – Ja'Marr Chase 76-yard pass from Jake Browning (Evan McPherson kick), 11:50. Bengals 21–14. **Drive: 3 plays, 84 yards, 1:31.**
- JAX – Parker Washington 14-yard pass from Trevor Lawrence (Brandon McManus kick), 5:26. Tied 21–21. **Drive: 12 plays, 84 yards, 6:24.**
- JAX – Trevor Lawrence 1-yard run (Brandon McManus kick), 3:10. Jaguars 28–21. **Drive: 4 plays, 9 yards, 2:06.**

**Fourth quarter**

- CIN – Jake Browning 1-yard run (Evan McPherson kick), 9:27. Tied 28–28. **Drive: 9 plays, 48 yards, 4:16.**
- CIN – Evan McPherson 54-yard field goal, 2:28. Bengals 31–28. **Drive: 7 plays, 26 yards, 2:31.**
- JAX – Brandon McManus 40-yard field goal, 0:26. Tied 31–31. **Drive: 9 plays, 53 yards, 2:02.**

**Overtime**

- CIN – Evan McPherson 48-yard field goal, 1:45. Bengals 34–31. **Drive: 12 plays, 42 yards, 3:17.**

**Top passers**

- CIN – Jake Browning – 32/37, 354 yards, TD
- JAX – Trevor Lawrence – 22/29, 258 yards, 2 TD

**Top rushers**

- CIN – Joe Mixon – 19 rushes, 68 yards, 2 TD
- JAX – Travis Etienne – 11 rushes, 45 yards, TD

**Top receivers**

- CIN – Ja'Marr Chase – 11 receptions, 149 yards, TD
- JAX – Evan Engram – 9 receptions, 82 yards, TD

==== Week 14: at Cleveland Browns ====
Week Fourteen: Jacksonville Jaguars at Cleveland Browns – Game summary

Quarter	1	2	3	4	Total
Jaguars	0	7	7	13	**27**
**Browns**	7	7	7	10	**31**

at Cleveland Browns Stadium, Cleveland, Ohio

- Date: December 10
- Game time: 1:00 p.m. EST
- Game weather: Cloudy, 39 °F (4 °C)
- Game attendance: 67,431
- Referee: Ronald Torbert
- TV announcers (CBS): Ian Eagle, Charles Davis and Evan Washburn
- Recap, Game Book

Game information

**First quarter**

- CLE – David Njoku 34-yard pass from Joe Flacco (Dustin Hopkins kick), 11:39. Browns 7–0. **Drive: 6 plays, 75 yards, 3:21.**

**Second quarter**

- CLE – David Njoku 30-yard pass from Joe Flacco (Dustin Hopkins kick), 13:40. Browns 14–0. **Drive: 4 plays, 72 yards, 1:25.**
- JAX – Evan Engram 10-yard pass from Trevor Lawrence (Brandon McManus kick), 6:14. Browns 14–7. **Drive: 2 plays, 12 yards, 0:39.**

**Third quarter**

- CLE – Kareem Hunt 4-yard run (Dustin Hopkins kick), 9:39. Browns 21–7. **Drive: 7 plays, 22 yards, 4:25.**
- JAX – Travis Etienne 1-yard run (Brandon McManus kick), 4:59. Browns 21–14. **Drive: 6 plays, 25 yards, 2:27.**

**Fourth quarter**

- CLE – David Bell 41-yard pass from Joe Flacco (Dustin Hopkins kick), 12:34. Browns 28–14. **Drive: 4 plays, 48 yards, 1:36.**
- JAX – Parker Washington 19-yard pass from Trevor Lawrence (Brandon McManus kick), 8:52. Browns 28–21. **Drive: 9 plays, 75 yards, 3:42.**
- CLE – Dustin Hopkins 55-yard field goal, 3:10. Browns 31–21. **Drive: 4 plays, 1 yard, 0:20.**
- JAX – Evan Engram 2-yard pass from Trevor Lawrence (pass failed), 1:33. Browns 31–27. **Drive: 9 plays, 75 yards, 1:37.**

**Top passers**

- JAX – Trevor Lawrence – 28/50, 257 yards, 3 TD, 3 INT
- CLE – Joe Flacco – 26/45, 311 yards, 3 TD, INT

**Top rushers**

- JAX – Travis Etienne – 14 rushes, 35 yards, TD
- CLE – Jerome Ford – 12 rushes, 51 yards

**Top receivers**

- JAX – Evan Engram – 11 receptions, 95 yards, 2 TD
- CLE – David Njoku – 6 receptions, 91 yards, 2 TD

==== Week 15: vs. Baltimore Ravens ====
Week Fifteen: Baltimore Ravens at Jacksonville Jaguars – Game summary

Quarter	1	2	3	4	Total
**Ravens**	3	7	0	13	**23**
Jaguars	0	0	7	0	**7**

at EverBank Stadium, Jacksonville, Florida

- Date: December 17
- Game time: 8:20 p.m. EST
- Game weather: 58 °F (14 °C)
- Game attendance: 68,021
- Referee: Shawn Smith
- TV announcers (NBC): Mike Tirico, Cris Collinsworth, and Melissa Stark
- Recap, Game Book

Game information

**First quarter**

- BAL – Justin Tucker 43-yard field goal, 6:21. Ravens 3–0. **Drive: 11 plays, 64 yards, 5:51.**

**Second quarter**

- BAL – Isaiah Likely 16-yard pass from Lamar Jackson (Justin Tucker kick), 1:12. Ravens 10–0. **Drive: 13 plays, 60 yards, 4:30.**

**Third quarter**

- JAX – Jamal Agnew 65-yard pass from Trevor Lawrence (Brandon McManus kick), 7:15. Ravens 10–7. **Drive: 5 plays, 88 yards, 2:59.**

**Fourth quarter**

- BAL – Gus Edwards 1-yard run (Justin Tucker kick), 14:58. Ravens 17–7. **Drive: 5 plays, 58 yards, 2:17.**
- BAL – Justin Tucker 26-yard field goal, 8:00. Ravens 20–7. **Drive: 10 plays, 69 yards, 5:32.**
- BAL – Justin Tucker 34-yard field goal, 6:01. Ravens 23–7. **Drive: 4 plays, 3 yards, 1:35.**

**Top passers**

- BAL – Lamar Jackson – 14/24, 171 yards, TD, INT
- JAX – Trevor Lawrence – 25/43, 264 yards, TD

**Top rushers**

- BAL – Lamar Jackson – 12 rushes, 97 yards
- JAX – Trevor Lawrence – 4 rushes, 41 yards

**Top receivers**

- BAL – Isaiah Likely – 5 receptions, 70 yards, TD
- JAX – Jamal Agnew – 2 receptions, 70 yards, TD

==== Week 16: at Tampa Bay Buccaneers ====
Week Sixteen: Jacksonville Jaguars at Tampa Bay Buccaneers – Game summary

Quarter	1	2	3	4	Total
Jaguars	0	0	6	6	**12**
**Buccaneers**	3	17	10	0	**30**

at Raymond James Stadium, Tampa, Florida

- Date: December 24
- Game time: 4:05 p.m. EST
- Game weather: Cloudy, 72 °F (22 °C)
- Game attendance: 62,547
- Referee: Brad Allen
- TV announcers (CBS): Kevin Harlan, Trent Green and Melanie Collins
- Recap, Game Book

Game information

**First quarter**

- TB – Chase McLaughlin 24-yard field goal, 7:22. Buccaneers 3–0. **Drive: 14 plays, 69 yards, 7:38.**

**Second quarter**

- TB – Mike Evans 3-yard pass from Baker Mayfield (Chase McLaughlin kick), 12:53. Buccaneers 10–0. **Drive: 11 plays, 56 yards, 6:07.**
- TB – Chase McLaughlin 31-yard field goal, 2:27. Buccaneers 13–0. **Drive: 9 plays, 45 yards, 3:53.**
- TB – Mike Evans 22-yard pass from Baker Mayfield (Chase McLaughlin kick), 0:45. Buccaneers 20–0. **Drive: 7 plays, 65 yards, 0:49.**

**Third quarter**

- TB – Rachaad White 2-yard run (Chase McLaughlin kick), 11:30. Buccaneers 27–0. **Drive: 5 plays, 37 yards, 2:03.**
- TB – Chase McLaughlin 51-yard field goal, 3:49. Buccaneers 30–0. **Drive: 10 plays, 27 yards, 5:32.**
- JAX – Calvin Ridley 18-yard pass from Trevor Lawrence (pass failed), 0:50. Buccaneers 30–6. **Drive: 10 plays, 75 yards, 2:59.**

**Fourth quarter**

- JAX – Calvin Ridley 1-yard pass from C. J. Beathard (pass failed), 4:36. Buccaneers 30–12. **Drive: 5 plays, 51 yards, 1:09.**

**Top passers**

- JAX – Trevor Lawrence – 17/29, 211 yards, TD, 2 INT
- TB – Baker Mayfield – 26/35, 283 yards, 2 TD

**Top rushers**

- JAX – Trevor Lawrence – 4 rushes, 29 yards
- TB – Rachaad White – 20 rushes, 39 yards, TD

**Top receivers**

- JAX – Evan Engram – 10 receptions, 95 yards
- TB – Mike Evans – 7 receptions, 86 yards, 2 TD

==== Week 17: vs. Carolina Panthers ====
Week Seventeen: Carolina Panthers at Jacksonville Jaguars – Game summary

Quarter	1	2	3	4	Total
Panthers	0	0	0	0	**0**
**Jaguars**	3	6	10	7	**26**

at EverBank Stadium, Jacksonville, Florida

- Date: December 31
- Game time: 1:00 p.m. EST
- Game weather: 56 °F (13 °C)
- Game attendance: 67,215
- Referee: Carl Cheffers
- TV announcers (CBS): Spero Dedes, Adam Archuleta and Aditi Kinkhabwala
- Recap, Game Book

Game information

**First quarter**

- JAX – Brandon McManus 35-yard field goal, 8:36. Jaguars 3–0. **Drive: 13 plays, 43 yards, 6:24.**

**Second quarter**

- JAX – Brandon McManus 26-yard field goal, 7:18. Jaguars 6–0. **Drive: 12 plays, 54 yards, 5:47.**
- JAX – Brandon McManus 24-yard field goal, 2:45. Jaguars 9–0. **Drive: 6 plays, 54 yards, 1:50.**

**Third quarter**

- JAX – Travis Etienne 62-yard run (Brandon McManus kick), 11:56. Jaguars 16–0. **Drive: 2 plays, 66 yards, 0:51.**
- JAX – Brandon McManus 34-yard field goal, 3:00. Jaguars 19–0. **Drive: 12 plays, 67 yards, 7:24.**

**Fourth quarter**

- JAX – Travis Etienne 1-yard run (Brandon McManus kick), 4:16. Jaguars 26–0. **Drive: 4 plays, 15 yards, 2:08.**

**Top passers**

- CAR – Bryce Young – 19/32, 112 yards, INT
- JAX – C. J. Beathard – 17/24, 178 yards

**Top rushers**

- CAR – Chuba Hubbard – 11 rushes, 45 yards
- JAX – Travis Etienne – 16 rushes, 102 yards, 2 TD

**Top receivers**

- CAR – Adam Thielen – 6 receptions, 38 yards
- JAX – Evan Engram – 6 receptions, 60 yards

==== Week 18: at Tennessee Titans ====
Week Eighteen: Jacksonville Jaguars at Tennessee Titans – Game summary

Quarter	1	2	3	4	Total
Jaguars	3	10	0	7	**20**
**Titans**	7	14	7	0	**28**

at Nissan Stadium, Nashville, Tennessee

- Date: January 7, 2024
- Game time: 1:00 p.m. EST/12:00 p.m. CST
- Game weather: Cloudy, 41 °F (5 °C)
- Game attendance: 63,744
- Referee: Tra Blake
- TV announcers (CBS): Kevin Harlan, Trent Green and Melanie Collins
- Recap, Game Book

Game information

**First quarter**

- JAX – Brandon McManus 44-yard field goal, 9:45. Jaguars 3–0. **Drive: 11 plays, 49 yards, 5:15.**
- TEN – Tyjae Spears 28-yard pass from Ryan Tannehill (Nick Folk kick), 5:57. Titans 7–3. **Drive: 7 plays, 75 yards, 3:48.**

**Second quarter**

- JAX – Calvin Ridley 59-yard pass from Trevor Lawrence (Brandon McManus kick), 12:24. Jaguars 10–7. **Drive: 7 plays, 88 yards, 4:30.**
- TEN – Derrick Henry 18-yard run (Nick Folk kick), 8:27. Titans 14–10. **Drive: 8 plays, 75 yards, 3:57.**
- TEN – Tyjae Spears 3-yard run (Nick Folk kick), 3:03. Titans 21–10. **Drive: 6 plays, 36 yards, 3:30.**
- JAX – Brandon McManus 30-yard field goal, 0:00. Titans 21–13. **Drive: 4 plays, 17 yards, 0:22.**

**Third quarter**

- TEN – DeAndre Hopkins 6-yard pass from Ryan Tannehill (Nick Folk kick), 12:45. Titans 28–13. **Drive: 4 plays, 75 yards, 2:15.**

**Fourth quarter**

- JAX – Evan Engram 14-yard pass from Trevor Lawrence (Brandon McManus kick), 14:55. Titans 28–20. **Drive: 10 plays, 63 yards, 5:13.**

**Top passers**

- JAX – Trevor Lawrence – 29/43, 280 yards, 2 TD, 2 INT
- TEN – Ryan Tannehill – 17/26, 283 yards, 2 TD, INT

**Top rushers**

- JAX – Travis Etienne – 16 rushes, 57 yards
- TEN – Derrick Henry – 19 rushes, 153 yards, TD

**Top receivers**

- JAX – Calvin Ridley – 6 receptions, 106 yards, TD
- TEN – DeAndre Hopkins – 7 receptions, 46 yards, TD

=== Standings ===
==== Division ====
AFC South
	W	L	T	PCT	DIV	CONF	PF	PA	STK
^{(4)} Houston Texans	10	7	0	.588	4–2	7–5	377	353	W2
Jacksonville Jaguars	9	8	0	.529	4–2	6–6	377	371	L1
Indianapolis Colts	9	8	0	.529	3–3	7–5	396	415	L1
Tennessee Titans	6	11	0	.353	1–5	4–8	305	367	W1

==== Conference ====
AFC
#	Team	Division	W	L	T	PCT	DIV	CONF	SOS	SOV	STK
**Division leaders**
1	Baltimore Ravens	North	13	4	0	.765	3–3	8–4	.543	.529	L1
2 (Note: Buffalo claimed the No. 2 seed over Kansas City based on head-to-head victory.) (Note: Buffalo finished ahead of Miami in the AFC East based on head-to-head sweep.)	Buffalo Bills	East	11	6	0	.647	4–2	7–5	.471	.471	W5
3	Kansas City Chiefs	West	11	6	0	.647	4–2	9–3	.481	.428	W2
4	Houston Texans	South	10	7	0	.588	4–2	7–5	.474	.465	W2
**Wild cards**
5 (Note: Cleveland claimed the No. 5 seed over Miami based on conference record.)	Cleveland Browns	North	11	6	0	.647	3–3	8–4	.536	.513	L1
6	Miami Dolphins	East	11	6	0	.647	4–2	7–5	.450	.358	L2
7	Pittsburgh Steelers	North	10	7	0	.588	5–1	7–5	.540	.571	W3
**Did not qualify for the postseason**
8 (Note: Cincinnati finished ahead of Jacksonville based on head-to-head victory. Division tie break was initially used to eliminate Indianapolis (see below).)	Cincinnati Bengals	North	9	8	0	.529	1–5	4–8	.574	.536	W1
9 (Note: Jacksonville finished ahead of Indianapolis based on head-to-head sweep.)	Jacksonville Jaguars	South	9	8	0	.529	4–2	6–6	.533	.477	L1
10	Indianapolis Colts	South	9	8	0	.529	3–3	7–5	.491	.444	L1
11 (Note: Las Vegas finished ahead of Denver based on head-to-head sweep.)	Las Vegas Raiders	West	8	9	0	.471	4–2	6–6	.488	.426	W1
12	Denver Broncos	West	8	9	0	.471	3–3	5–7	.488	.485	L1
13	New York Jets	East	7	10	0	.412	2–4	4–8	.502	.454	W1
14	Tennessee Titans	South	6	11	0	.353	1–5	4–8	.522	.422	W1
15	Los Angeles Chargers	West	5	12	0	.294	1–5	3–9	.529	.388	L5
16	New England Patriots	East	4	13	0	.235	2–4	4–8	.522	.529	L2
**Tiebreakers** (Note: When breaking ties for three or more teams under the NFL's rules, they are first broken within divisions, then comparing only the highest ranked remaining team from each division.)
