= Otis Reese =

American football player (born 1998)

Otis Reese IV
Profile
- Position: Linebacker

Personal information
- Born: July 2, 1998 (age 28); Leesburg, Georgia, U.S.
- Listed height: 6 ft 3 in (1.91 m)
- Listed weight: 214 lb (97 kg)

Career information
- High school: Lee County (Leesburg)
- College: Georgia (2018–2019); Ole Miss (2020–2022)
- NFL draft: 2023: undrafted

Career history
- Tennessee Titans (2023–2024); Buffalo Bills (2025)*; New England Patriots (2025)*; Buffalo Bills (2026)*
- * Offseason or practice squad member only

Career NFL statistics as of 2024
- Total tackles: 38
- Interceptions: 1
- Stats at Pro Football Reference

Otis Sylvester Reese IV (born July 2, 1998) is an American professional football linebacker. He played college football for the Georgia Bulldogs and Ole Miss Rebels.

== Early life and college career ==
Reese was born on July 2, 1998, and grew up in Leesburg, Georgia. He attended Lee County High School and was ranked a four-star prospect, the 87th-best player nationally and the fifth-best outside linebacker by 247Sports. He initially committed to play college football for the Michigan Wolverines before flipping his commitment to the Georgia Bulldogs. As a true freshman in 2018, Reese played in 11 games, and the following year, he played all 14 games and posted two tackles.

Reese transferred to Ole Miss in 2020 and applied for an immediate eligibility waiver with the NCAA, calling out what he described as "racist events" at the school that took a "devastating mental toll." Despite him having announced his transfer at the start of the year, the NCAA waited until the third-to-last game of the season to grant him eligibility. He played the final three games and had 24 tackles with an interception.

Reese started all 13 games for Ole Miss in 2021, placing fourth on the team with 90 tackles while also having two pass breakups, one forced fumble, two tackles-for-loss and 1.5 sacks. In 2022, he continued as a starter and had 84 tackles (second-best on the team), eight for a loss, three sacks and an interception. He declared for the National Football League Draft after the season, finishing his stint at the school with 198 total tackles, two interceptions and 4.5 sacks.

== Professional career ==
Pre-draft measurables
Height	Weight	Arm length	Hand span	Wingspan	20-yard shuttle	Three-cone drill	Bench press
6 ft 2 7/8 in (1.90 m)	214 lb (97 kg)	31 3/4 in (0.81 m)	8 3/8 in (0.21 m)	6 ft 5 5/8 in (1.97 m)	4.45 s	7.38 s	18 reps
All values from Pro Day

=== Tennessee Titans ===
After going unselected in the 2023 NFL draft, Reese was signed by the Tennessee Titans as an undrafted free agent. He earned praise from coach Mike Vrabel in training camp and made the team's final roster. He was waived on September 22, 2023, and re-signed to the practice squad. He was promoted to the active roster on December 6. Reese played seven games (three starts) during the 2023 season, recording 21 total tackles.

Reese continued playing with the Titans during the 2024 season, primarily on special teams and as a backup linebacker. He replaced an injured Kenneth Murray during Week 14's loss against the Jacksonville Jaguars, making seven tackles and catching his first career interception. On January 4, 2025, Reese was placed on injured reserve before the final game of the season due to an ankle injury. He appeared in 13 games during the season (including two starts), and finished the year with 17 tackles, two pressures, and an interception.

On March 7, 2025, Reese signed a one-year contract extension with the Titans. He was waived by the Titans on August 13.

=== Buffalo Bills ===
On September 23, 2025, Reese was signed to the Buffalo Bills' practice squad. He was released on October 7.

=== New England Patriots ===
On November 17, 2025, Reese was signed to the New England Patriots' practice squad. On February 11, 2026, he signed a reserve/futures contract with New England. He was waived by the Patriots on July 31.

=== Buffalo Bills (second stint) ===
On August 6, 2026, Reese signed with the Buffalo Bills. He was waived by the Bills on August 29.
