= Tony Dews =

American football player and coach (born 1973)

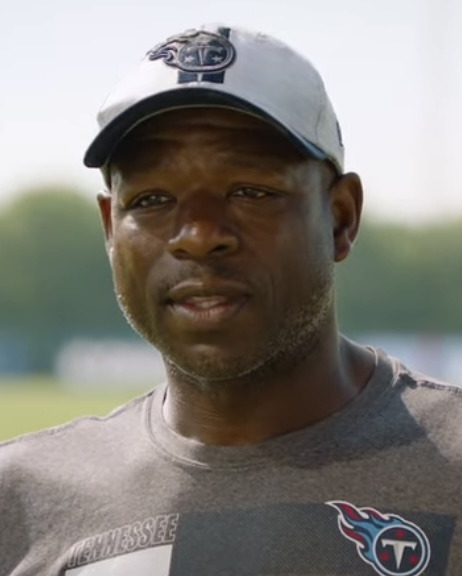
- Dews with the Tennessee Titans in 2021

New England Patriots
- Title: Running backs coach

Personal information
- Born: June 6, 1973 (age 53); Clifton, Virginia, U.S.

Career information
- Position: Tight end
- High school: Centreville (Fairfax County, Virginia)
- College: Liberty

Career history
- Bainbridge HS (GA) (1997) Offensive line coach; Millersville (1998) Defensive line coach; West Virginia (1999–2001) Graduate assistant, offensive line coach & defensive backs coach; California (PA) (2002) Offensive line coach; Holy Cross (2003) Defensive line coach; Central Michigan (2004–2005) Tight ends coach & special teams coach; UNLV (2006) Linebackers coach & special teams coach; West Virginia (2007) Wide receivers coach; Michigan (2008–2010) Wide receivers coach & punt team coordinator; Pittsburgh (2011) Tight ends coach & recruiting coordinator; Arizona (2012–2016) Wide receivers coach; West Virginia (2017) Running backs coach; Tennessee Titans (2018–2022) Running backs coach; Tennessee Titans (2023) Tight ends coach; New York Jets (2024) Running backs coach; New England Patriots (2025–present) Running backs coach

Tony Oshey Dews (born June 6, 1973) is an American football coach who is the running backs coach for the New England Patriots of the National Football League (NFL). He has coached at nine different colleges and has coached every offensive and defensive position except quarterback. He played college football at Liberty University.

== College career ==
Tony Dews played college football as a tight end for Liberty University under head coach Sam Rutigliano. He played from 1992 to 1995, and was the team's leading receiver among tight ends his final two years. He graduated with a bachelor's degree in 1996.

== Coaching career ==
=== Early career ===
Dews coached the offensive line at Bainbridge High School in Bainbridge, Georgia in 1997.

=== College coaching ===
Dews coached the defensive line for Millersville University in 1998. He then became a graduate assistant for West Virginia in 1999, engaging with the offensive line and defensive backs. Dews helped the team win the Music City Bowl in 2000. He then graduated with a master's degree from West Virginia in 2001. Upon graduating, Dews coached the offensive line for California University of Pennsylvania in 2002 and defensive line at Holy Cross in 2003. He moved on to Central Michigan and coached the tight ends and special teams from 2004 to 2005. He then became the linebackers and special teams coach for UNLV in 2006. Dews returned to West Virginia in 2007 to coach wide receivers, helping them to win the Fiesta Bowl. From 2008 to 2010, Dews coached wide receivers and was the punt team coordinator for Michigan. In 2011, he coached tight ends and was the recruiting coordinator for Pitt. From 2012 to 2016, Dew was the wide receivers coach for Arizona, helping them reach four bowl games and winning three. In 2017, Dews once again returned to West Virginia, this time as the running backs coach. The team reached the Heart of Dallas Bowl, losing to Utah.

=== Professional career ===
==== Tennessee Titans ====
On February 6, 2018, Dews was hired as the running backs coach for the Tennessee Titans under head coach Mike Vrabel. In the 2018 season, running back Derrick Henry had career highs at the time for rushing yards (1,059), rushing touchdowns (12), and average yards per run (4.9). It was also Henry's first career 1,000 yard season. In Week 13 of the 2019 season, Henry surpassed the 1,000 yard mark for the second consecutive season. Henry finished the 2019 season with another career year, leading the NFL in rushing yards with 1,540 and tying for the most rushing touchdowns with 16.

==== New York Jets ====
On January 26, 2024, Dews was hired by the New York Jets as their running backs coach.

==== New England Patriots ====
On January 22, 2025, Dews was hired by the New England Patriots to rejoin Vrabel as their running backs coach.

== Personal life ==
Dews and his wife, Tamika, have four daughters, Savannah, Sierra, Sydney, and Sienna.
