= Shakel Brown =

American football player (born 1998)

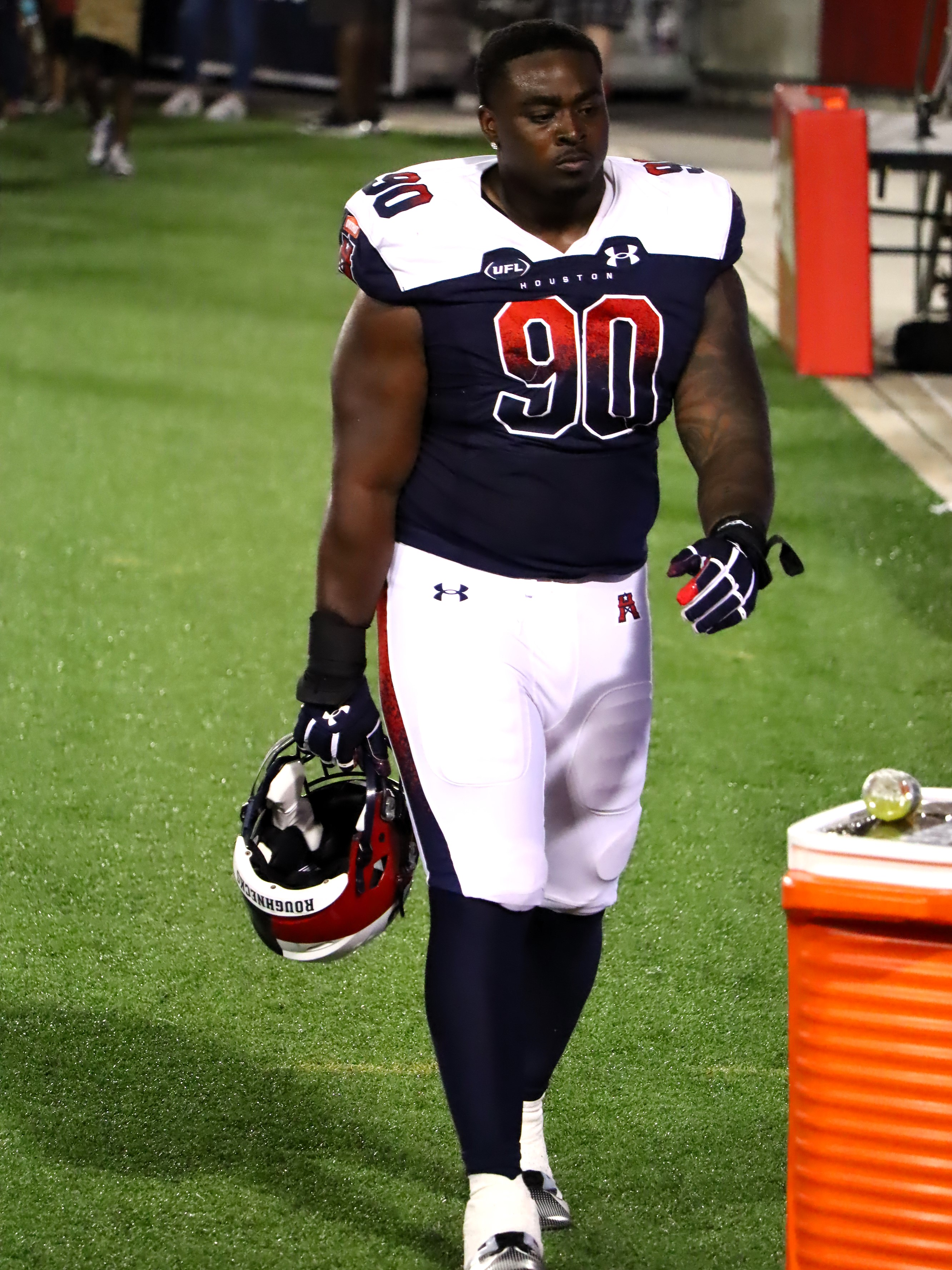
- Brown with the Houston Roughnecks in 2025

Profile
- Position: Defensive end

Personal information
- Born: December 4, 1998 (age 27); Miami, Florida, U.S.
- Listed height: 6 ft 3 in (1.91 m)
- Listed weight: 295 lb (134 kg)

Career information
- High school: Lincoln (Tallahassee, Florida)
- College: Highlands CC (2018); Itawamba CC (2019); Troy (2020–2022)
- NFL draft: 2023: undrafted

Career history
- Tennessee Titans (2023)*; San Francisco 49ers (2024)*; Miami Dolphins (2024)*; Houston Roughnecks (2025); Edmonton Elks (2025); San Francisco 49ers (2025)*; Birmingham Stallions (2026)*
- * Offseason or practice squad member only
- Stats at Pro Football Reference

Shakel Malik Brown (born December 4, 1998) is an American professional football defensive end. He played college football for the Troy Trojans.

== Early life ==
Brown was born on December 4, 1998, in Miami, Florida. He attended Lincoln High School where he lettered in football and in basketball.

== College career ==
=== Highlands CC ===
On February 1, 2017, Brown signed to play at Highlands Community College in Kansas.

=== Itawamba CC ===
Brown appeared in eight games and recorded 11 tackles and 2.5 tackles for loss.

=== Troy ===
During the 2020 season, Brown played in nine games and started four of them. He finished the season with 12 tackles (seven solo stops and five assisted), seven total pressures, two hits, five hurries and a fumble recovery. During the 2021 season, he played in seven games and finished the season with 14 tackles (two solo stops and 12 assisted), two tackles for loss for five yards and 0.5 sacks for two yards. During the 2022 season, Brown played in 13 games and started five of them. He finished the season with 32 tackles (11 solo stops and 21 assisted), six tackles for loss for 27 yards, four sacks for 24 yards, one pass breakup, one forced fumble and one fumble recovery.

== Professional career ==
Pre-draft measurables
| Height | Weight | Arm length | Hand span | 40-yard dash | 10-yard split | 20-yard split | 20-yard shuttle | Three-cone drill | Vertical jump | Broad jump | Bench press |
|---|---|---|---|---|---|---|---|---|---|---|---|
| 6 ft 3 1/4 in (1.91 m) | 295 lb (134 kg) | 32 1/8 in (0.82 m) | 9 5/8 in (0.24 m) | 4.92 s | 1.73 s | 2.72 s | 4.44 s | 7.58 s | 32.5 in (0.83 m) | 8 ft 9 in (2.67 m) | 30 reps |
All values from Pro Day

=== Tennessee Titans ===
After not being selected in the 2023 NFL draft, Brown signed with the Tennessee Titans as an undrafted free agent on April 29, 2023. He was placed on the injured reserve list on August 14, 2023 after sustaining an ankle injury during a preseason game against the Bears on August 12.

On May 7, 2024, Brown was waived by the Titans.

=== San Francisco 49ers (first stint) ===
On May 14, 2024, Brown signed with the San Francisco 49ers. He was waived on August 27, and later re-signed to the practice squad. Brown was released on October 1.

=== Miami Dolphins ===
On October 30, 2024, Brown was signed to the Miami Dolphins practice squad.

=== Houston Roughnecks ===
On January 14, 2025, Brown signed with the Houston Roughnecks of the United Football League (UFL). He was released on April 28.

=== San Francisco 49ers (second stint) ===
On August 15, 2025, Brown signed with the San Francisco 49ers. He was waived on August 25.

=== Birmingham Stallions ===
On October 3, 2025, Brown signed with the Birmingham Stallions of the United Football League (UFL).
