= Colton Dowell =

American football player (born 1999)

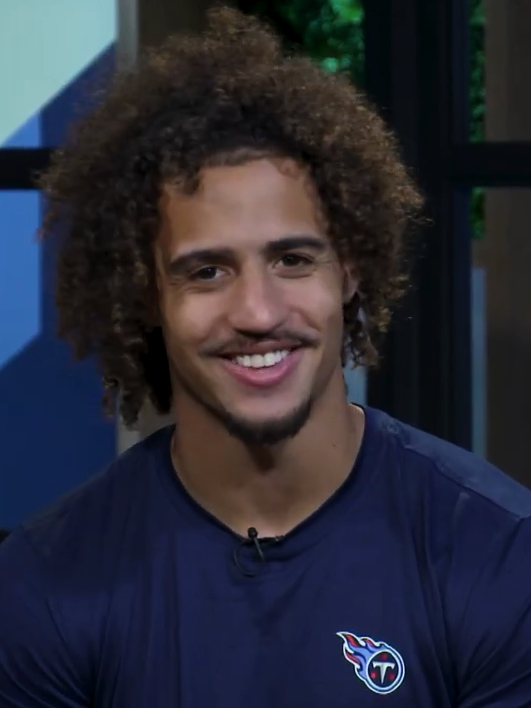
- Dowell in 2023

Profile
- Position: Wide receiver

Personal information
- Born: April 19, 1999 (age 27); Lebanon, Tennessee, U.S.
- Listed height: 6 ft 3 in (1.91 m)
- Listed weight: 212 lb (96 kg)

Career information
- High school: Wilson Central (Lebanon)
- College: UT Martin (2017–2022)
- NFL draft: 2023: 7th round, 228th overall pick

Career history
- Tennessee Titans (2023–2024); Baltimore Ravens (2025)*; San Francisco 49ers (2026)*; Pittsburgh Steelers (2026)*
- * Offseason or practice squad member only

Career NFL statistics as of 2024
- Receptions: 1
- Receiving yards: 3
- Receiving touchdowns: 0
- Stats at Pro Football Reference

Colton Davis Dowell (born April 19, 1999) is an American professional football wide receiver. He played college football for the UT Martin Skyhawks and was selected by the Tennessee Titans in the seventh round of the 2023 NFL draft.

== Early life ==
Dowell was born on April 19, 1999, in Lebanon, Tennessee, and grew up there. He attended Wilson Central High School in Lebanon and as a senior helped them go 8–3 while posting 799 receiving yards off 44 receptions with five touchdowns. Dowell was a two-star recruit and received offers from numerous NCAA Division I Football Championship Subdivision teams, as well as two Football Bowl Subdivision teams. He initially committed to play for the Chattanooga Mocs, before later switching to the UT Martin Skyhawks.

== College career ==
As a true freshman at UT Martin in 2017, Dowell redshirted. The following year, he appeared in 11 games and recorded 10 catches for 138 yards with three touchdowns. In 2019, Dowell appeared in 12 games, started 10, and posted 765 receiving yards, second-best on the team, off of 38 receptions with four touchdowns. He was named to the HERO Sports sophomore All-America team and was named second-team all-conference.

In the spring 2021 season, postponed from 2020 due to the COVID-19 pandemic, Dowell started all seven games and recorded 40 receptions for 459 yards and four touchdowns, being named first-team All-Ohio Valley Conference (OVC). Despite only appearing in six games in the fall 2021 season due to an injury, he was able to make 22 catches for 398 yards with two touchdowns, earning another all-conference selection. In his final year, Dowell totaled 67 receptions for 1,036 yards with six touchdowns, being a first-team all-conference choice. He finished his stint at UT Martin as their all-time leader in receiving yards, 2,796, while additionally tallying 177 receptions and 19 scores.

== Professional career ==
Pre-draft measurables
Height	Weight	Arm length	Hand span	Wingspan	40-yard dash	10-yard split	20-yard split	20-yard shuttle	Three-cone drill	Vertical jump	Broad jump	Bench press
6 ft 2 7/8 in (1.90 m)	212 lb (96 kg)	32 in (0.81 m)	9 1/4 in (0.23 m)	6 ft 4 3/4 in (1.95 m)	4.44 s	1.56 s	2.64 s	4.17 s	7.07 s	41.5 in (1.05 m)	11 ft 1 in (3.38 m)	23 reps
All values from Pro Day

=== Tennessee Titans ===
Dowell was selected in the seventh round (228th overall) of the 2023 NFL draft by the Tennessee Titans. He made the team's final roster and saw his first playing time in a Week 4 win over the Cincinnati Bengals. In week 17 against the Houston Texans, Dowell suffered a torn ACL and meniscus, ending his season.

Dowell was placed on the reserve/PUP list at the start of the 2024 season due to his knee injury, and did not play for the year.

On July 25, 2025, Dowell was waived by the Titans.

=== Baltimore Ravens ===
On October 20, 2025, Dowell was signed to the Baltimore Ravens' practice squad, but was released by the team five days later.

=== San Francisco 49ers ===
Dowell signed a reserve/future contract with the San Francisco 49ers on January 14, 2026. He was waived by San Francisco on August 6.

=== Pittsburgh Steelers ===
On August 7, 2026, Dowell was claimed off waivers by the Pittsburgh Steelers, but was waived two days later.
