= T. K. McLendon =

American football player (born 1999)

T. K. McLendon Jr.
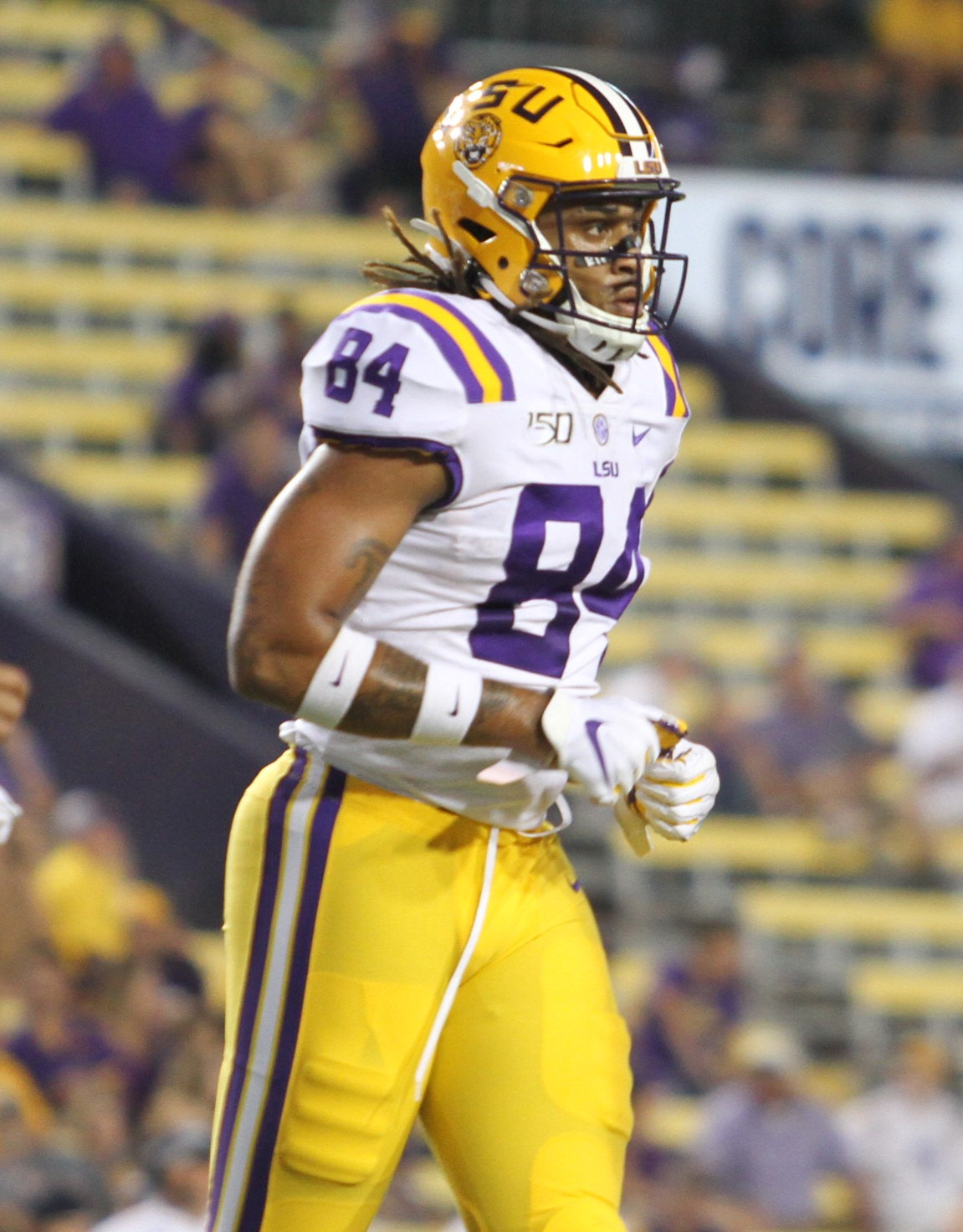
- McLendon with LSU in 2019

Profile
- Position: Defensive end

Personal information
- Born: February 27, 1999 (age 27); Soperton, Georgia, U.S.
- Listed height: 6 ft 4 in (1.93 m)
- Listed weight: 275 lb (125 kg)

Career information
- High school: Treutlen County (Soperton)
- College: Copiah–Lincoln CC (2017–2018); LSU (2019–2020); Eastern Kentucky (2021–2022)
- NFL draft: 2023: undrafted

Career history
- Tennessee Titans (2023–2024); Louisville Kings (2026)*
- * Offseason or practice squad member only

Career NFL statistics as of 2024
- Total tackles: 8
- Fumble recoveries: 1
- Stats at Pro Football Reference

Tonyist Karnez "T. K." McLendon Jr. (born February 27, 1999) is an American professional football defensive end. He played college football for the Eastern Kentucky Colonels.

== College career ==
McLendon played college for the LSU Tigers and for the Eastern Kentucky Colonels.

== Professional career ==
Pre-draft measurables
Height	Weight	Arm length	Hand span	40-yard dash	10-yard split	20-yard split	20-yard shuttle	Three-cone drill	Vertical jump	Broad jump
6 ft 4 in (1.93 m)	275 lb (125 kg)	33 1/2 in (0.85 m)	9 1/2 in (0.24 m)	5.04 s	1.82 s	2.84 s	4.75 s	8.08 s	36.5 in (0.93 m)	10 ft 7 in (3.23 m)
All values from Pro Day

=== Tennessee Titans ===
McLendon was signed by the Tennessee Titans as an undrafted free agent on May 12, 2023. He was waived on August 29, and re-signed to the practice squad. He was promoted to the active roster on November 18, 2023. As a rookie, he appeared in seven games and made two starts in the 2023 season. McLendon was placed on injured reserve on August 27, 2024.

=== Louisville Kings ===
On March 10, 2026, McLendon signed with the Louisville Kings of the United Football League (UFL). He was released on March 19.
