= Scott Novak =

American football official (born 1971)

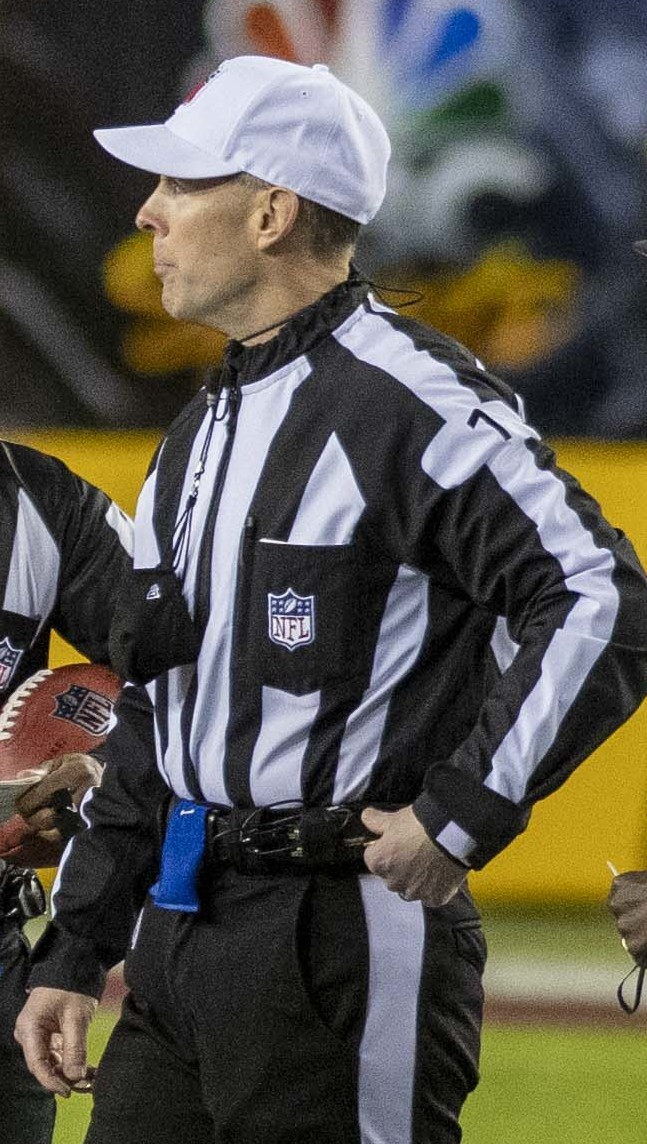
- Novak at Wild Card Round 2020 (Tampa Bay Buccaneers at Washington Football Team)
- Born: February 20, 1971 (age 55); Miami, Florida, U.S.
- Education: Metropolitan State University of Denver
- Occupation: NFL official (2014–present)

Scott Novak (born February 20, 1971) is an American professional football official in the National Football League (NFL) since the 2014 NFL season, wearing uniform number 1.

== Personal life ==
Novak resides in Colorado. He played baseball as a pitcher at Metropolitan State University of Denver from 1988 to 1990.

== Officiating career ==
=== Early years ===
Novak served several seasons in the NFL Officiating Development program. Prior to entering the NFL, Novak was in the Big 12 Conference and worked as a referee and deep wing official. He was the referee for the 2012 BCS National Championship Game between Alabama and LSU.

=== NFL career ===
Novak was hired by the NFL in 2014 as a field judge, and was promoted to referee with the start of the 2019 NFL season following the retirements of Pete Morelli and Walt Coleman. He is the first NFL official to wear the uniform number 1.

=== 2024 crew ===
- R: Scott Novak
- U: Mark Pellis
- DJ: Brian Sakowski
- LJ: Mark Stewart
- FJ: Terry Brown
- SJ: David Meslow
- BJ: Terrence Miles
- RO: Matt Sumstine
- RA: Tim England
