= 2021 Jacksonville Jaguars season =

27th season in franchise history

- Owner: Shahid Khan
- General manager: Trent Baalke
- Head coach: Urban Meyer (fired December 16; 2–11 record); Darrell Bevell (interim, Weeks 15–18; 1–3 record)
- Offensive coordinator: Brian Schottenheimer
- Defensive coordinator: Joe Cullen
- Home stadium: TIAA Bank Field

Results
- Record: 3–14
- Division place: 4th AFC South
- Playoffs: Did not qualify
- Pro Bowlers: None

Uniform
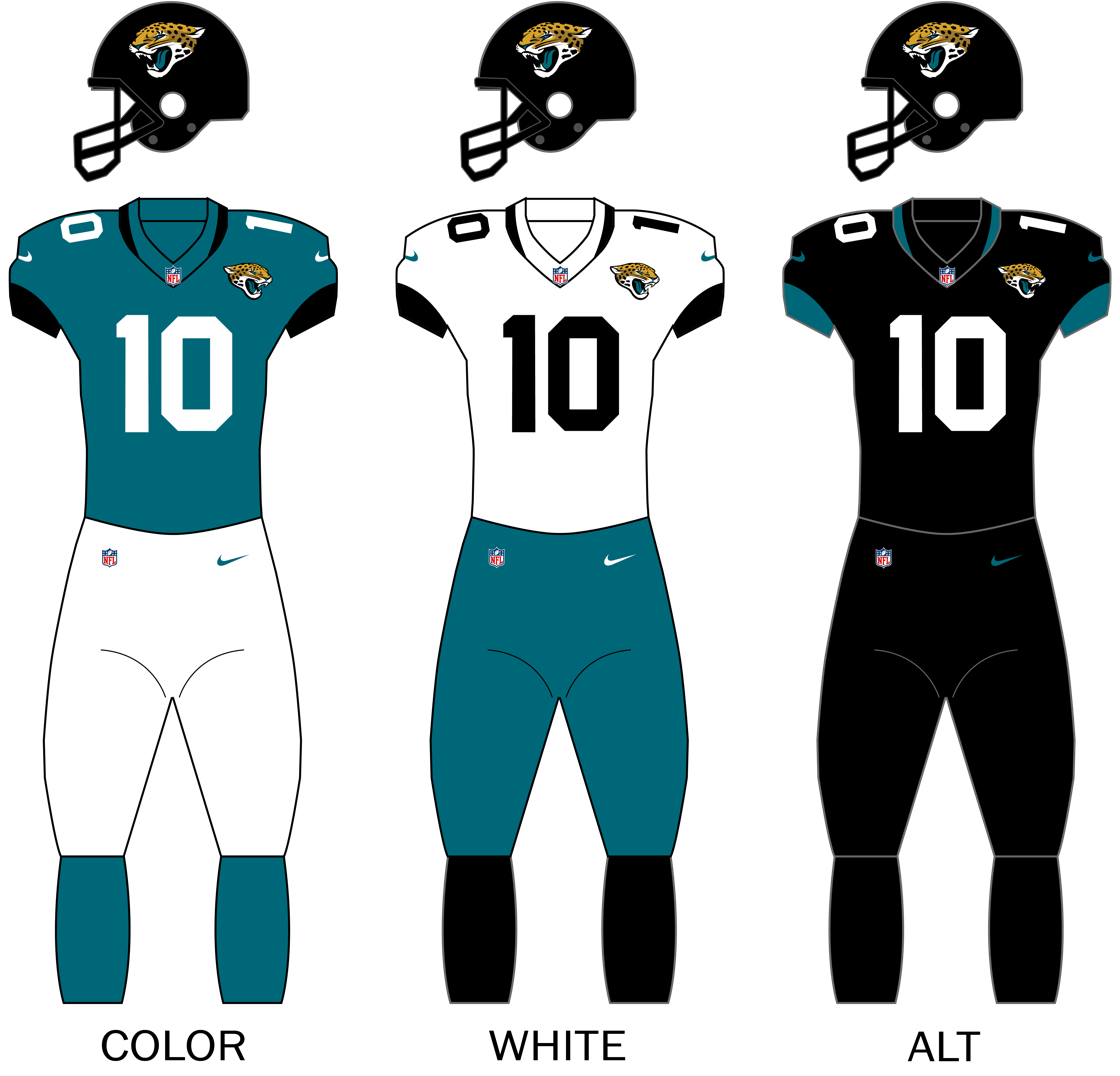

The 2021 season was the Jacksonville Jaguars' 27th season in the National Football League (NFL). This was their only season under head coach Urban Meyer and first under general manager Trent Baalke.

Jacksonville had the first overall pick in the 2021 NFL draft, which they used to select Trevor Lawrence. The Jaguars came into the season with a 15-game losing streak from the last season. The losing streak continued this season as the Jaguars started 0–5, before defeating the Miami Dolphins 23–20 in London. To date, the 2020–2021 Jaguars' 20-game losing streak is the third longest losing streak in NFL history, after the 1976–1977 Tampa Bay Buccaneers (26) and 1942–1945 Chicago Cardinals (29).

The Jaguars finished 3–14, improving upon their 1–15 record from the previous season. However, they were eliminated from playoff contention for the fourth straight year, following a Week 14 loss to the Tennessee Titans. The Jaguars clinched the first overall pick in the 2022 NFL draft, becoming the first team since the Cleveland Browns in the 2017 and 2018 Drafts to have the top pick in back-to-back years.

On December 16, after less than a year and following repeated scandals involving the team, Meyer was fired as head coach and replaced with Darrell Bevell for the remainder of the season.

== Season summary ==
The team was criticized by the media following repeated scandals involving the team, with head coach Urban Meyer the most caught up in multiple scandals. During the offseason, some of Meyer's staff hires and free agent signings received backlash. In February, former Iowa strength coach Chris Doyle, who had left that job due to allegations of racism and bullying players, was hired as the Jaguars' strength coach before fan backlash led to him resigning one day later. In addition, the signing of former Florida and NFL quarterback Tim Tebow as a tight end was criticized as a publicity grab, especially as Tebow had not played a down of football since the 2015 preseason and was eventually cut after the first preseason game. On July 1, 2021, the Jaguars were fined $200,000 and Meyer was fined $100,000 for OTA violations. The NFLPA then investigated the Jaguars after Meyer claimed that vaccination status was taken into account when deciding the roster cuts.

In October, a video surfaced appearing to show Meyer inappropriately touching a woman who was not his wife while he was at his Columbus-area restaurant, Urban Meyer's Pint House, following a loss to the Cincinnati Bengals. Jaguars owner Shahid Khan said that Meyer's behavior had been "inexcusable" and that Meyer "must regain our trust and respect". Meyer later apologized to the team and personnel.

Meyer was also criticized for benching running back James Robinson during losses to the Seattle Seahawks and Los Angeles Rams. During the latter loss, Meyer claimed that Robinson's benching was "injury-related" and quarterback Trevor Lawrence had to request to put him back in.

The tension surrounding the team got worse in December 2021, when Jaguars players and coaches were critical of Meyer's treatment of them, to which the team officially responded with assertions of Meyer's job security. Meyer and wide receiver Marvin Jones got into a heated argument where Jones left the Jaguars facility. Jones returned to the facility when other staff members convinced him to come back, only to get into another argument with Meyer at practice. Jones would later deny getting into an argument with Meyer.

Meyer also reportedly called his assistant coaches "losers", said that he was a "winner", and challenged assistants to defend their resumes. Owner Shahid Khan met with players, members of the team's business department and coaches, including Meyer following the Jaguars loss to the Tennessee Titans in Week 14.

On December 15, 2021, former Jaguars kicker Josh Lambo alleged that Meyer kicked him in the leg during a practice in the week before the Jaguars' final preseason game against the Dallas Cowboys. According to Lambo, Meyer also shouted at him, "Hey dipshit, make your fucking kicks." (Lambo had missed a field goal in each of the previous two preseason games.) After Lambo told Meyer never to kick him again, Meyer responded, "I’m the head ball coach, I’ll kick you whenever the fuck I want." Later that day, Lambo reported the incident to his agent, who then reported it to the Jaguars team.

Urban Meyer was fired on December 16, 2021 finishing his tenure with the Jaguars with a 2–11 (.154) record. Darrell Bevell was named interim head coach for the remainder of the season. Prior to Meyer's dismissal, quarterback Trevor Lawrence criticized the drama affecting the team in a press conference, without naming Meyer.

During the final week of the season, numerous Jaguars fans attended the team's home game against the Indianapolis Colts dressed as clowns in protest of unpopular moves by team management and the Jaguars' overall struggles.

== Offseason ==
=== Free agents ===
==== Re-signed ====
- S Josh Jones
- RB Dare Ogunbowale
- TE James O'Shaughnessy
- C Tyler Shatley

==== Players lost ====
- WR Keelan Cole – Signed with the New York Jets
- WR Chris Conley – Signed with the Houston Texans
- QB Mike Glennon – Signed with the New York Giants
- CB Greg Mabin– Signed with the Tennessee Titans
- CB Rashaan Melvin –Signed with the Carolina Panthers
- TE Eric Saubert – Signed with the Denver Broncos

==== Players added ====
- QB C. J. Beathard – Signed from the San Francisco 49ers
- SS Rudy Ford – Signed from the Arizona Cardinals
- CB Shaquill Griffin – Signed from the Seattle Seahawks
- RB Carlos Hyde – Signed from the Seattle Seahawks
- WR Marvin Jones – Signed from the Detroit Lions
- TE Chris Manhertz – Signed from the Carolina Panthers
- WR Laquon Treadwell – Signed from the Atlanta Falcons
- DE Jihad Ward – Signed from the Baltimore Ravens

=== Trades ===
- QB Gardner Minshew – Traded to Philadelphia Eagles for a 2022 sixth-round pick
- TE Josh Oliver – Traded to Baltimore Ravens for a 2022 seventh-round pick
- LB Joe Schobert – Traded to Pittsburgh Steelers for a 2022 sixth-round pick
- CB Josiah Scott – Traded to Philadelphia Eagles for CB Jameson Houston and a 2023 sixth-round pick

=== NFL draft ===
2021 Jacksonville Jaguars draft
| Round | Pick | Player | Position | College | Notes |
|---|---|---|---|---|---|
| 1 | 1 | Trevor Lawrence | QB | Clemson | |
| 1 | 25 | Travis Etienne | RB | Clemson | From Rams |
| 2 | 33 | Tyson Campbell | CB | Georgia | |
| 2 | 45 | Walker Little | OT | Stanford | From Vikings |
| 3 | 65 | Andre Cisco | S | Syracuse | |
| 4 | 106 | Jay Tufele | DT | USC | |
| 4 | 121 | Jordan Smith | DE | UAB | From Rams |
| 5 | 145 | Luke Farrell | TE | Ohio State | |
| 6 | 209 | Jalen Camp | WR | Georgia Tech | From Rams |

Pre-draft trades

- The Los Angeles Rams traded their 2020 first-round selection (K'Lavon Chaisson) as well as their 2021 first (Travis Etienne) and fourth (Jordan Smith) round selections to Jacksonville in exchange for cornerback Jalen Ramsey.
- Minnesota traded their second-round selection, along with a previously-conditional 2022 fifth-round selection, to Jacksonville in exchange for defensive end Yannick Ngakoue. The fifth-round selection would have upgraded to the fourth round if Ngakoue had gone to the Pro Bowl at the end of the 2020 season, but he was not named, or the third round if the Vikings had won the Super Bowl, but they were eliminated from postseason contention.
- Cleveland traded a fifth-round selection to Jacksonville in exchange for safety Ronnie Harrison.
- Jacksonville traded a sixth-round selection to Tennessee in exchange for a seventh-round selection and linebacker Kamalei Correa.
- Jacksonville traded a seventh-round selection to New Orleans in exchange for defensive tackle Malcom Brown.

Draft day trades

- The Los Angeles Rams traded their fourth-round selection (#121 overall) and sixth-round selection (#209 overall) for the Jaguars' fourth, fifth, and seventh-round selections (#130, #170, and #249 overall).

=== Undrafted free agents ===
| Name | Position | College |
|---|---|---|
| D. J. Daniel | CB | Georgia |
| Josh Imatorbhebhe | WR | Illinois |
| Tim Jones | WR | Southern Miss |

== Staff ==
2021 Jacksonville Jaguars staff
| Front office: Owner – Shahid Khan; President – Mark Lamping; General manager – Trent Baalke; Senior personnel executive – Tom Gamble; Player personnel coordinator – Drew Hughes; Director of college scouting – Michael Davis; Director of pro scouting – Regis Eller; Director of pro personnel – DeJuan Polk; Director of player assessment – Ryan Stamper; Director of roster management – Trip MacCracken; National scout – Tom McConnaughey; National scout – John Stevenson; Chief Football Strategy Officer – Tony Khan; VP of Football Analytics – Eugene Shen; Head coaches: Head coach – Urban Meyer (fired mid season); Interim head coach/offensive coordinator – Darrell Bevell; Assistant head coach/inside linebackers – Charlie Strong; Offensive coaches: Passing game coordinator/quarterbacks – Brian Schottenheimer; Running backs – Bernie Parmalee; Wide receivers – Sanjay Lal; Tight ends – Tyler Bowen; Offensive line – George Warhop; Assistant offensive line – Todd Washington; Offensive quality control – Quinton Ganther; Offensive quality control – Kyle Caskey; Offensive assistant – Will Harriger | Defensive coaches: Defensive coordinator – Joe Cullen; Defensive line – Tosh Lupoi; Assistant defensive line – Sterling Lucas; Outside linebackers – Zach Orr; Assistant linebackers – Tony Gilbert; Cornerbacks – Tim Walton; Safeties – Chris Ash; Nickels – Joe Danna; Senior defensive assistant – Bob Sutton; Defensive quality control – Patrick Reilly; Special teams coaches: Special teams coordinator – Brian Schneider (left before season); Special teams coordinator – Nick Sorensen; Assistant special teams coordinator – Carlos Polk; Strength and conditioning: Head strength and conditioning Coach – Anthony Schlegel; Assistant strength and conditioning – Adam Potts; Assistant strength and conditioning – Brandon Ireland; Assistant strength and conditioning – Cedric Scott; Associate strength coach – Kevin Maxen; Associate strength coach – Jackson Schafer |

== Final roster ==
2021 Jacksonville Jaguars roster
| Quarterbacks (QB): 16 Trevor Lawrence; Running backs (RB): 23 Ryquell Armstead; 33 Dare Ogunbowale; 36 Mekhi Sargent; Wide receivers (WR): 7 Tavon Austin; 11 Marvin Jones; 4 Jaydon Mickens; 10 Laviska Shenault; 18 Laquon Treadwell; Tight ends (TE): 89 Luke Farrell; 86 Jacob Hollister; 84 Chris Manhertz; 80 James O'Shaughnessy; 47 Kahale Warring | Offensive linemen (OL): 78 Ben Bartch G; 72 Walker Little T; 62 K. C. McDermott G/C; 68 Andrew Norwell G; 69 Tyler Shatley C; 75 Jawaan Taylor T; Defensive linemen (DL): 41 Josh Allen DE; 90 Malcom Brown DT; 93 Taven Bryan DT; 96 Adam Gotsis DE; 52 DaVon Hamilton DT; 95 Roy Robertson-Harris DT; 92 Jordan Smith DE; 91 Dawuane Smoot DE; 97 Jay Tufele DT; 6 Jihad Ward DE | Linebackers (LB): 59 Tyrell Adams MLB; 53 Dakota Allen OLB; 44 Myles Jack OLB; 40 Jamir Jones OLB; 50 Shaq Quarterman MLB; 54 Damien Wilson MLB; Defensive backs (DB): 32 Tyson Campbell CB; 38 Andre Cisco FS; 27 Chris Claybrooks CB; 26 Shaquill Griffin CB; 37 Tre Herndon CB; 21 Nevin Lawson CB; 29 Brandon Rusnak FS; 20 Daniel Thomas SS; Special teams (ST): 46 Ross Matiscik LS; 15 Matthew Wright K | Practice squad: 35 Lorenzo Burns CB; 19 Joseph Charlton P; 58 Doug Costin DT; 88 Jeff Cotton WR; 31 Nathan Cottrell RB; 64 Coy Cronk T; 12 Danny Etling QB; 81 Josh Hammond WR; 70 Jared Hocker G; 34 Michael Jacquet CB; 83 Tim Jones WR; 98 Jeremiah Ledbetter DE; 22 Bradley McDougald FS; 87 Matt Sokol TE; 73 Badara Traore T; 77 Tre'Vour Wallace-Simms G; Reserve: 39 Jamal Agnew WR (IR); 85 Dan Arnold TE (IR); 3 C. J. Beathard QB (COVID-19); 60 A. J. Cann G (IR); 45 K'Lavon Chaisson DE (COVID-19); 17 D. J. Chark WR (IR); 9 Logan Cooke P (IR); 1 Travis Etienne RB (IR); 5 Rudy Ford SS (COVID-19); 14 Terry Godwin WR (IR); 24 Carlos Hyde RB (IR); 2 Rayshawn Jenkins FS (IR); 65 Brandon Linder C (COVID-19); 55 Lerentee McCray DE (COVID-19); 48 Dylan Moses OLB (NF-Inj.); 76 Will Richardson T (IR); 74 Cam Robinson T (COVID-19); 25 James Robinson RB (IR); 49 Chapelle Russell OLB (COVID-19); 13 J. K. Scott P (COVID-19); 42 Andrew Wingard FS (COVID-19); Rookies in italics 46 active, 21 reserve, 16 practice squad |

== Preseason ==
The Jaguars' preseason opponents were announced on May 12.

| Week | Date | Opponent | Result | Record | Venue | Recap |
|---|---|---|---|---|---|---|
| 1 | August 14 | Cleveland Browns | L 13–23 | 0–1 | TIAA Bank Field | Recap |
| 2 | August 23 | at New Orleans Saints | L 21–23 | 0–2 | Caesars Superdome | Recap |
| 3 | August 29 | at Dallas Cowboys | W 34–14 | 1–2 | AT&T Stadium | Recap |

== Regular season ==
Jacksonville’s schedule was announced on May 12. Ahead of the schedule release it was confirmed that the Jaguars would face the Houston Texans away to open the season and would host the Miami Dolphins at Tottenham Hotspur Stadium in week 6 on October 17. This was the Jaguars' eighth home game in London but their first at Tottenham Hotspur Stadium.

=== Schedule ===
| Week | Date | Opponent | Result | Record | Venue | Recap |
|---|---|---|---|---|---|---|
| 1 | September 12 | at **Houston Texans** | **L** 21–37 | 0–1 | NRG Stadium | Recap |
| 2 | September 19 | Denver Broncos | **L** 13–23 | 0–2 | TIAA Bank Field | Recap |
| 3 | September 26 | Arizona Cardinals | **L** 19–31 | 0–3 | TIAA Bank Field | Recap |
| 4 | September 30 | at Cincinnati Bengals | **L** 21–24 | 0–4 | Paul Brown Stadium | Recap |
| 5 | October 10 | **Tennessee Titans** | **L** 19–37 | 0–5 | TIAA Bank Field | Recap |
| 6 | October 17 | Miami Dolphins | **W** 23–20 | 1–5 | (United Kingdom) Tottenham Hotspur Stadium (London) | Recap |
| 7 | Bye | | | | | |
| 8 | October 31 | at Seattle Seahawks | **L** 7–31 | 1–6 | Lumen Field | Recap |
| 9 | November 7 | Buffalo Bills | **W** 9–6 | 2–6 | TIAA Bank Field | Recap |
| 10 | November 14 | at **Indianapolis Colts** | **L** 17–23 | 2–7 | Lucas Oil Stadium | Recap |
| 11 | November 21 | San Francisco 49ers | **L** 10–30 | 2–8 | TIAA Bank Field | Recap |
| 12 | November 28 | Atlanta Falcons | **L** 14–21 | 2–9 | TIAA Bank Field | Recap |
| 13 | December 5 | at Los Angeles Rams | **L** 7–37 | 2–10 | SoFi Stadium | Recap |
| 14 | December 12 | at **Tennessee Titans** | **L** 0–20 | 2–11 | Nissan Stadium | Recap |
| 15 | December 19 | **Houston Texans** | **L** 16–30 | 2–12 | TIAA Bank Field | Recap |
| 16 | December 26 | at New York Jets | **L** 21–26 | 2–13 | MetLife Stadium | Recap |
| 17 | January 2 | at New England Patriots | **L** 10–50 | 2–14 | Gillette Stadium | Recap |
| 18 | January 9 | **Indianapolis Colts** | **W** 26–11 | 3–14 | TIAA Bank Field | Recap |

Note: Intra-division opponents are in bold text.

=== Game summaries ===
==== Week 1: at Houston Texans ====
Week One: Jacksonville Jaguars at Houston Texans – Game summary

| Quarter | 1 | 2 | 3 | 4 | Total |
|---|---|---|---|---|---|
| Jaguars | 0 | 7 | 7 | 7 | **21** |
| **Texans** | 14 | 13 | 7 | 3 | **37** |

at NRG Stadium, Houston, Texas

- Date: September 12
- Game time: 1:00 p.m. EDT/12:00 p.m. CDT
- Game weather: None (retractable roof closed)
- Game attendance: 68,105
- Referee: Land Clark
- TV announcers (CBS): Greg Gumbel, Adam Archuleta and AJ Ross
- Recap, Game Book

Game information

**First quarter**

- HOU – Mark Ingram II 1-yard run (Joey Slye kick), 6:42. Texans 7–0. **Drive: 14 plays, 84 yards, 7:02.**
- HOU – David Johnson 7-yard pass from Tyrod Taylor (Joey Slye kick), 2:25. Texans 14–0. **Drive: 5 plays, 55 yards, 2:14.**

**Second quarter**

- JAX – Chris Manhertz 22-yard pass from Trevor Lawrence (Josh Lambo kick), 12:25. Texans 14–7. **Drive: 11 plays, 75 yards, 5:05.**
- HOU – Joey Slye 40-yard field goal, 8:11. Texans 17–7. **Drive: 9 plays, 54 yards, 4:13.**
- HOU – Joey Slye 26-yard field goal, 1:02. Texans 20–7. **Drive: 5 plays, 0 yards, 1:18.**
- HOU – Danny Amendola 8-yard pass from Tyrod Taylor (Joey Slye kick), 0:08. Texans 27–7. **Drive: 4 plays, 69 yards, 0:29.**

**Third quarter**

- HOU – Phillip Lindsay 5-yard run (Joey Slye kick), 3:24. Texans 34–7. **Drive: 9 plays, 68 yards, 4:44.**
- JAX – D. J. Chark 41-yard pass from Trevor Lawrence (Josh Lambo kick), 1:48. Texans 34–14. **Drive: 4 plays, 75 yards, 1:36.**

**Fourth quarter**

- HOU – Joey Slye 25-yard field goal, 11:59. Texans 37–14. **Drive: 7 plays, 62 yards, 2:53.**
- JAX – Marvin Jones 4-yard pass from Trevor Lawrence (Josh Lambo kick), 0:05. Texans 37–21. **Drive: 12 plays, 85 yards, 2:45.**

**Top passers**

- JAX – Trevor Lawrence – 28/51, 332 yards, 3 TD, 3 INT
- HOU – Tyrod Taylor – 21/33, 291 yards, 2 TD

**Top rushers**

- JAX – Carlos Hyde – 9 rushes, 44 yards
- HOU – Mark Ingram II – 26 rushes, 85 yards, TD

**Top receivers**

- JAX – D. J. Chark – 3 receptions, 86 yards, TD
- HOU – Brandin Cooks – 5 receptions, 132 yards

==== Week 2: vs. Denver Broncos ====
Week Two: Denver Broncos at Jacksonville Jaguars – Game summary

| Quarter | 1 | 2 | 3 | 4 | Total |
|---|---|---|---|---|---|
| **Broncos** | 3 | 7 | 10 | 3 | **23** |
| Jaguars | 7 | 0 | 0 | 6 | **13** |

at TIAA Bank Field, Jacksonville, Florida

- Date: September 19
- Game time: 1:00 p.m. EDT
- Game weather: Cloudy, 78 °F (26 °C)
- Game attendance: 58,461
- Referee: Clay Martin
- TV announcers (CBS): Spero Dedes and Jay Feely
- Recap, Game Book

Game information

**First quarter**

- JAX – Marvin Jones 25-yard pass from Trevor Lawrence (Josh Lambo kick), 9:21. Jaguars 7–0. **Drive: 11 plays, 83 yards, 5:39.**
- DEN – Brandon McManus 32-yard field goal, 0:26. Jaguars 7–3. **Drive: 13 plays, 61 yards, 8:55.**

**Second quarter**

- DEN – Tim Patrick 12-yard pass from Teddy Bridgewater (Brandon McManus kick), 1:54. Broncos 10–7. **Drive: 8 plays, 80 yards, 4:02.**

**Third quarter**

- DEN – Noah Fant 14-yard pass from Teddy Bridgewater (Brandon McManus kick), 12:35. Broncos 17–7. **Drive: 4 plays, 75 yards, 2:25.**
- DEN – Brandon McManus 46-yard field goal, 1:04. Broncos 20–7. **Drive: 7 plays, 24 yards, 3:19.**

**Fourth quarter**

- DEN – Brandon McManus 40-yard field goal, 5:42. Broncos 23–7. **Drive: 9 plays, 72 yards, 4:49.**
- JAX – Jamal Agnew 102–yard kick return (pass failed), 5:26. Broncos 23–13.

**Top passers**

- DEN – Teddy Bridgewater – 26/34, 328 yards, 2 TD
- JAX – Trevor Lawrence – 14/33, 118 yards, TD, 2 INT

**Top rushers**

- DEN – Javonte Williams – 13 rushes, 64 yards
- JAX – James Robinson – 11 rushes, 47 yards

**Top receivers**

- DEN – Courtland Sutton – 9 receptions, 159 yards
- JAX – Marvin Jones – 6 receptions, 55 yards, TD

==== Week 3: vs. Arizona Cardinals ====
Week Three: Arizona Cardinals at Jacksonville Jaguars – Game summary

| Quarter | 1 | 2 | 3 | 4 | Total |
|---|---|---|---|---|---|
| **Cardinals** | 7 | 0 | 17 | 7 | **31** |
| Jaguars | 0 | 13 | 6 | 0 | **19** |

at TIAA Bank Field, Jacksonville, Florida

- Date: September 26
- Game time: 1:00 p.m. EDT
- Game weather: Sunny, 80 °F (27 °C)
- Game attendance: 58,012
- Referee: Shawn Smith
- TV announcers (Fox): Gus Johnson, Aqib Talib and Megan Olivi
- Recap, Game Book

Game information

**First quarter**

- ARI – Kyler Murray 1-yard run (Matt Prater kick), 6:42. Cardinals 7–0. **Drive: 7 plays, 56 yards, 3:22.**

**Second quarter**

- JAX – D. J. Chark 12-yard pass from Trevor Lawrence (Josh Lambo kick), 0:21. Tied 7–7. **Drive: 9 plays, 74 yards, 3:01.**
- JAX – Jamal Agnew 109–yard kick return (kick failed), 0:00. Jaguars 13–7.

**Third quarter**

- ARI – Matt Prater 34-yard field goal, 7:38. Jaguars 13–10. **Drive: 12 plays, 68 yards, 4:47.**
- JAX – James Robinson 4-yard run (kick failed), 3:33. Jaguars 19–10. **Drive: 8 plays, 75 yards, 4:05.**
- ARI – James Conner 4-yard run (Matt Prater kick), 1:21. Jaguars 19–17. **Drive: 5 plays, 75 yards, 2:12.**
- ARI – Byron Murphy 29–yard interception return (Matt Prater kick), 0:24. Cardinals 24–19.

**Fourth quarter**

- ARI – James Conner 1-yard run (Matt Prater kick), 6:49. Cardinals 31–19. **Drive: 11 plays, 65 yards, 6:52.**

**Top passers**

- ARI – Kyler Murray – 28/34, 316 yards, INT
- JAX – Trevor Lawrence – 22/34, 219 yards, TD, 2 INT

**Top rushers**

- ARI – James Conner – 11 rushes, 43 yards, 2 TD
- JAX – James Robinson – 15 rushes, 88 yards, TD

**Top receivers**

- ARI – A. J. Green – 5 receptions, 112 yards
- JAX – Marvin Jones – 6 receptions, 62 yards

Jamal Agnew tied the record for longest play in NFL history when he returned 68-yard field goal attempt 109 yards for a touchdown.

==== Week 4: at Cincinnati Bengals ====
Week Four: Jacksonville Jaguars at Cincinnati Bengals – Game summary

| Quarter | 1 | 2 | 3 | 4 | Total |
|---|---|---|---|---|---|
| Jaguars | 7 | 7 | 0 | 7 | **21** |
| **Bengals** | 0 | 0 | 14 | 10 | **24** |

at Paul Brown Stadium, Cincinnati, Ohio

- Date: September 30
- Game time: 8:20 p.m. EDT
- Game weather: Clear, 70 °F (21 °C)
- Game attendance: 63,198
- Referee: Brad Allen
- TV announcers (NFLN): Joe Buck, Troy Aikman, Erin Andrews and Kristina Pink
- Recap, Game Book

Game information

**First quarter**

- JAX – James Robinson 6-yard run (Matthew Wright kick), 1:28. Jaguars 7–0. **Drive: 8 plays, 67 yards, 3:53.**

**Second quarter**

- JAX – Trevor Lawrence 7-yard run (Matthew Wright kick), 4:45. Jaguars 14–0. **Drive: 12 plays, 80 yards, 7:10.**

**Third quarter**

- CIN – C. J. Uzomah 22-yard pass from Joe Burrow (Evan McPherson kick), 13:12. Jaguars 14–7. **Drive: 4 plays, 69 yards, 1:48.**
- CIN – Joe Mixon 1-yard run (Evan McPherson kick), 5:10. Tied 14–14. **Drive: 12 plays, 86 yards, 6:29.**

**Fourth quarter**

- JAX – James Robinson 4-yard run (Matthew Wright kick), 14:27. Jaguars 21–14. **Drive: 11 plays, 77 yards, 5:43.**
- CIN – C. J. Uzomah 33-yard pass from Joe Burrow (Evan McPherson kick), 8:59. Tied 21–21. **Drive: 10 plays, 75 yards, 5:28.**
- CIN – Evan McPherson 35-yard field goal, 0:00. Bengals 24–21. **Drive: 10 plays, 73 yards, 5:33.**

**Top passers**

- JAX – Trevor Lawrence – 17/24, 204 yards
- CIN – Joe Burrow – 25/32, 348 yards, 2 TD

**Top rushers**

- JAX – James Robinson – 18 rushes, 78 yards, 2 TD
- CIN – Joe Mixon – 16 rushes, 67 yards, TD

**Top receivers**

- JAX – Laviska Shenault – 6 receptions, 99 yards
- CIN – Tyler Boyd – 9 receptions, 118 yards

==== Week 5: vs. Tennessee Titans ====
Week Five: Tennessee Titans at Jacksonville Jaguars – Game summary

| Quarter | 1 | 2 | 3 | 4 | Total |
|---|---|---|---|---|---|
| **Titans** | 7 | 17 | 7 | 6 | **37** |
| Jaguars | 6 | 7 | 0 | 6 | **19** |

at TIAA Bank Field, Jacksonville, Florida

- Date: October 10
- Game time: 1:00 p.m. EDT
- Game weather: Partly cloudy, 78 °F (26 °C)
- Game attendance: 58,282
- Referee: Alex Kemp
- TV announcers (CBS): Tom McCarthy and Tiki Barber
- Recap, Game Book

Game information

**First quarter**

- TEN – Kevin Byard 30–yard fumble return (Randy Bullock kick), 14:00. Titans 7–0.
- JAX – James Robinson 1-yard run (kick failed), 11:21. Titans 7–6. **Drive: 5 plays, 75 yards, 2:39.**

**Second quarter**

- TEN – Derrick Henry 1-yard run (Randy Bullock kick), 14:56. Titans 14–6. **Drive: 11 plays, 79 yards, 4:50.**
- JAX – Jacob Hollister 1-yard pass from Trevor Lawrence (Matthew Wright kick), 9:55. Titans 14–13. **Drive: 9 plays, 70 yards, 5:01.**
- TEN – MyCole Pruitt 14-yard pass from Ryan Tannehill (Randy Bullock kick), 5:49. Titans 21–13. **Drive: 8 plays, 75 yards, 4:06.**
- TEN – Randy Bullock 34-yard field goal, 0:31. Titans 24–13. **Drive: 7 plays, 41 yards, 1:51.**

**Third quarter**

- TEN – Derrick Henry 9-yard run (Randy Bullock kick), 9:48. Titans 31–13. **Drive: 11 plays, 75 yards, 5:12.**

**Fourth quarter**

- JAX – Trevor Lawrence 4-yard run (pass failed), 13:50. Titans 31–19. **Drive: 10 plays, 80 yards, 4:46.**
- TEN – Derrick Henry 10-yard run (kick failed), 1:54. Titans 37–19. **Drive: 5 plays, 39 yards, 2:02.**

**Top passers**

- TEN – Ryan Tannehill – 14/22, 197 yards, TD
- JAX – Trevor Lawrence – 23/33, 273 yards, TD, INT

**Top rushers**

- TEN – Derrick Henry – 29 rushes, 130 yards, 3 TD
- JAX – James Robinson – 18 rushes, 149 yards, TD

**Top receivers**

- TEN – Marcus Johnson – 3 receptions, 52 yards
- JAX – Dan Arnold – 6 receptions, 64 yards

==== Week 6: vs. Miami Dolphins ====
NFL London games

Week Six: Miami Dolphins at Jacksonville Jaguars – Game summary

| Quarter | 1 | 2 | 3 | 4 | Total |
|---|---|---|---|---|---|
| Dolphins | 7 | 6 | 0 | 7 | **20** |
| **Jaguars** | 3 | 7 | 7 | 6 | **23** |

at Tottenham Hotspur Stadium, London, England

- Date: October 17
- Game time: 1:30 p.m. BST/9:30 a.m. EDT
- Game weather: Partly cloudy, 61 °F (16 °C)
- Game attendance: 60,784
- Referee: John Hussey
- TV announcers (CBS): Kevin Harlan, Trent Green and Melanie Collins
- Recap Game Book

Game information

**First quarter**

- MIA – Jaylen Waddle 6-yard pass from Tua Tagovailoa (Jason Sanders kick), 7:45. Dolphins 7–0. **Drive: 13 plays, 75 yards, 7:15.**
- JAX – Matthew Wright 40-yard field goal, 3:49. Dolphins 7–3. **Drive: 8 plays, 56 yards, 3:56.**

**Second quarter**

- MIA– Jason Sanders 33-yard field goal, 14:15. Dolphins 10–3. **Drive: 9 plays, 66 yards, 4:34.**
- MIA– Jason Sanders 24-yard field goal, 5:38. Dolphins 13–3. **Drive: 8 plays, 32 yards, 3:11.**
- JAX – Marvin Jones 28-yard pass from Trevor Lawrence (Matthew Wright kick), 0:40. Dolphins 13–10. **Drive: 6 plays, 49 yards, 1:05.**

**Third quarter**

- JAX – James Robinson 1-yard run (Matthew Wright kick), 12:29. Jaguars 17–13. **Drive: 5 plays, 75 yards, 2:31.**

**Fourth quarter**

- MIA – Jaylen Waddle 2-yard pass from Tua Tagovailoa (Jason Sanders kick), 10:22. Dolphins 20–17. **Drive: 7 plays, 91 yards, 3:53.**
- JAX – Matthew Wright 54-yard field goal, 3:40. Tied 20–20. **Drive: 9 plays, 44 yards, 2:59.**
- JAX – Matthew Wright 53-yard field goal, 0:00. Jaguars 23–20. **Drive: 5 plays, 11 yards, 1:42.**

**Top passers**

- MIA – Tua Tagovailoa – 33/47, 329 yards, 2 TD, INT
- JAX – Trevor Lawrence – 25/41, 319 yards, TD

**Top rushers**

- MIA – Malcolm Brown – 5 rushes, 24 yards
- JAX – James Robinson – 17 rushes, 73 yards, TD

**Top receivers**

- MIA – Mike Gesicki – 8 receptions, 115 yards
- JAX – Marvin Jones – 7 receptions, 100 yards, TD

==== Week 8: at Seattle Seahawks ====
Week Eight: Jacksonville Jaguars at Seattle Seahawks – Game summary

| Quarter | 1 | 2 | 3 | 4 | Total |
|---|---|---|---|---|---|
| Jaguars | 0 | 0 | 0 | 7 | **7** |
| **Seahawks** | 7 | 10 | 7 | 7 | **31** |

at Lumen Field, Seattle, Washington

- Date: October 31
- Game time: 4:05 p.m. EDT/1:05 p.m. PDT
- Game weather: Sunny, 54 °F (12 °C)
- Game attendance: 67,243
- Referee: Adrian Hill
- TV announcers (CBS): Greg Gumbel, Adam Archuleta and AJ Ross
- Recap, Game Book

Game information

**First quarter**

- SEA – Geno Smith 1-yard run (Jason Myers kick), 4:19. Seahawks 7–0. **Drive: 10 plays, 80 yards, 5:09.**

**Second quarter**

- SEA – DK Metcalf 16-yard pass from Geno Smith (Jason Myers kick), 9:24. Seahawks 14–0. **Drive: 8 plays, 73 yards, 4:06.**
- SEA– Jason Myers 31-yard field goal, 0:06. Seahawks 17–0. **Drive: 12 plays, 47 yards, 6:00.**

**Third quarter**

- SEA – DK Metcalf 5-yard pass from Geno Smith (Jason Myers kick), 8:09. Seahawks 24–0. **Drive: 8 plays, 62 yards, 3:42.**

**Fourth quarter**

- JAX – Jamal Agnew 29-yard pass from Trevor Lawrence (Matthew Wright kick), 1:49. Seahawks 24–7. **Drive: 16 plays, 80 yards, 4:45.**
- SEA – Travis Homer 44–yard kick return (Jason Myers kick), 1:43. Seahawks 31–7.

**Top passers**

- JAX – Trevor Lawrence – 32/54, 238 yards, TD, INT
- SEA – Geno Smith – 22/24, 195 yards, 2 TD

**Top rushers**

- JAX – Carlos Hyde – 9 rushes, 32 yards
- SEA – Alex Collins – 10 rushes, 44 yards

**Top receivers**

- JAX – Dan Arnold – 8 receptions, 68 yards
- SEA – Tyler Lockett – 12 receptions, 142 yards

==== Week 9: vs. Buffalo Bills ====
Week Nine: Buffalo Bills at Jacksonville Jaguars – Game summary

| Quarter | 1 | 2 | 3 | 4 | Total |
|---|---|---|---|---|---|
| Bills | 3 | 3 | 0 | 0 | **6** |
| **Jaguars** | 3 | 3 | 0 | 3 | **9** |

at TIAA Bank Field, Jacksonville, Florida

- Date: November 7
- Game time: 1:00 p.m. EST
- Game weather: Cloudy, 58 °F (14 °C)
- Game attendance: 63,110
- Referee: Land Clark
- TV announcers (CBS): Andrew Catalon, James Lofton and Jenny Dell
- Recap, Game Book

Game information

**First quarter**

- JAX – Matthew Wright 39-yard field goal, 8:57. Jaguars 3–0. **Drive: 12 plays, 54 yards, 6:03.**
- BUF – Tyler Bass 24-yard field goal, 3:54. Tied 3–3. **Drive: 12 plays, 48 yards, 5:03.**

**Second quarter**

- BUF – Tyler Bass 41-yard field goal, 10:59. Bills 6–3. **Drive: 12 plays, 48 yards, 6:24.**
- JAX – Matthew Wright 55-yard field goal, 5:30. Tied 6–6. **Drive: 10 plays, 38 yards, 5:29.**

**Third quarter**

- No scoring plays.

**Fourth quarter**

- JAX – Matthew Wright 21-yard field goal, 12:10. Jaguars 9–6. **Drive: 10 plays, 27 yards, 4:45.**

**Top passers**

- BUF – Josh Allen – 31/47, 264 yards, 2 INT
- JAX – Trevor Lawrence – 15/26, 118 yards

**Top rushers**

- BUF – Josh Allen – 5 rushes, 50 yards
- JAX – Carlos Hyde – 21 rushes, 67 yards

**Top receivers**

- BUF – Stefon Diggs – 6 receptions, 85 yards
- JAX – Dan Arnold – 4 receptions, 60 yards

==== Week 10: at Indianapolis Colts ====
Week Ten: Jacksonville Jaguars at Indianapolis Colts – Game summary

| Quarter | 1 | 2 | 3 | 4 | Total |
|---|---|---|---|---|---|
| Jaguars | 6 | 3 | 0 | 8 | **17** |
| **Colts** | 17 | 3 | 0 | 3 | **23** |

at Lucas Oil Stadium, Indianapolis, Indiana

- Date: November 14
- Game time: 1:00 p.m. EST
- Game weather: None (retractable roof closed)
- Game attendance: 60,622
- Referee: Tony Corrente
- TV announcers (CBS): Andrew Catalon, James Lofton and Sherree Burruss
- Recap, Game Book

Game information

**First quarter**

- IND – Michael Badgley 24-yard field goal, 9:57. Colts 3–0. **Drive: 10 plays, 63 yards, 5:03.**
- IND – E. J. Speed 12–yard blocked punt return (Michael Badgley kick), 8:23. Colts 10–0.
- IND – Jonathan Taylor 4-yard run (Michael Badgley kick), 2:48. Colts 17–0. **Drive: 8 plays, 53 yards, 4:07.**
- JAX – Jamal Agnew 66-yard run (kick failed, wide right), 1:03. Colts 17–6. **Drive: 4 plays, 78 yards, 1:45.**

**Second quarter**

- IND – Michael Badgley 29-yard field goal, 1:43. Colts 20–6. **Drive: 9 plays, 71 yards, 3:39.**
- JAX – Matthew Wright 56-yard field goal, 0:00. Colts 20–9. **Drive: 6 plays, 32 yards, 0:36.**

**Third quarter**

- No scoring plays.

**Fourth quarter**

- JAX – James Robinson 1-yard run (pass succeeded), 10:34. Colts 20–17. **Drive: 10 plays, 65 yards, 5:10.**
- IND – Michael Badgley 37-yard field goal, 2:22. Colts 23–17. **Drive: 11 plays, 64 yards, 5:06.**

**Top passers**

- JAX – Trevor Lawrence – 16/35, 162 yards
- IND – Carson Wentz – 22/34, 180 yards

**Top rushers**

- JAX – Jamal Agnew – 3 rushes, 79 yards, TD
- IND – Jonathan Taylor – 21 rushes, 116 yards, TD

**Top receivers**

- JAX – Dan Arnold – 5 receptions, 67 yards
- IND – Michael Pittman Jr. – 5 receptions, 71 yards

==== Week 11: vs. San Francisco 49ers ====
Week Eleven: San Francisco 49ers at Jacksonville Jaguars – Game summary

| Quarter | 1 | 2 | 3 | 4 | Total |
|---|---|---|---|---|---|
| **49ers** | 3 | 17 | 7 | 3 | **30** |
| Jaguars | 0 | 3 | 0 | 7 | **10** |

at TIAA Bank Field, Jacksonville, Florida

- Date: November 21
- Game time: 1:00 p.m. EST
- Game weather: Sunny, 67 °F (19 °C)
- Game attendance: 60,268
- Referee: Ronald Torbert
- TV announcers (Fox): Chris Myers, Daryl Johnston and Jen Hale
- Recap, Game Book

Game information

**First quarter**

- SF – Robbie Gould 20-yard field goal, 1:55. 49ers 3–0. **Drive: 20 plays, 87 yards, 13:05.**

**Second quarter**

- SF – Deebo Samuel 25-yard run (Robbie Gould kick), 11:24. 49ers 10–0. **Drive: 7 plays, 80 yards, 3:56.**
- SF – Brandon Aiyuk 6-yard pass from Jimmy Garoppolo (Robbie Gould kick), 8:25. 49ers 17–0. **Drive: 7 plays, 35 yards, 2:51.**
- JAX – Matthew Wright 30-yard field goal, 1:53. 49ers 17–3. **Drive: 12 plays, 67 yards, 6:32.**
- SF – Robbie Gould 48-yard field goal, 0:00. 49ers 20–3. **Drive: 7 plays, 45 yards, 1:53.**

**Third quarter**

- SF – George Kittle 1-yard pass from Jimmy Garoppolo (Robbie Gould kick), 8:49. 49ers 27–3. **Drive: 11 plays, 77 yards, 5:45.**

**Fourth quarter**

- SF – Robbie Gould 45-yard field goal, 5:33. 49ers 30–3. **Drive: 5 plays, 17 yards, 3:00.**
- JAX – James Robinson 1-yard run (Matthew Wright kick), 3:04. 49ers 30–10. **Drive: 8 plays, 75 yards, 2:29.**

**Top passers**

- SF – Jimmy Garoppolo – 16/22, 176 yards, 2 TD
- JAX – Trevor Lawrence – 16/25, 158 yards

**Top rushers**

- SF – Deebo Samuel – 8 rushes, 79 yards, TD
- JAX – James Robinson – 12 rushes, 29 yards, TD

**Top receivers**

- SF – Brandon Aiyuk – 7 receptions, 85 yards, TD
- JAX – Laviska Shenault – 5 receptions, 50 yards

==== Week 12: vs. Atlanta Falcons ====
Week Twelve: Atlanta Falcons at Jacksonville Jaguars – Game summary

| Quarter | 1 | 2 | 3 | 4 | Total |
|---|---|---|---|---|---|
| **Falcons** | 7 | 7 | 7 | 0 | **21** |
| Jaguars | 0 | 3 | 8 | 3 | **14** |

at TIAA Bank Field, Jacksonville, Florida

- Date: November 28
- Game time: 1:00 p.m. EST
- Game weather: Partly cloudy, 62 °F (17 °C)
- Game attendance: 60,031
- Referee: Carl Cheffers
- TV announcers (Fox): Kevin Kugler, Mark Sanchez and Laura Okmin
- Recap, Game Book

Game information

**First quarter**

- ATL – Cordarrelle Patterson 7-yard run (Younghoe Koo kick), 0:38. Falcons 7–0. **Drive: 9 plays, 81 yards, 5:17.**

**Second quarter**

- ATL – Cordarrelle Patterson 12-yard run (Younghoe Koo kick), 6:40. Falcons 14–0. **Drive: 4 plays, 29 yards, 1:04.**
- JAX – Matthew Wright 22-yard field goal, 0:46. Falcons 14–3. **Drive: 14 plays, 70 yards, 5:55.**

**Third quarter**

- ATL – Russell Gage 12-yard pass from Matt Ryan (Younghoe Koo kick), 7:47. Falcons 21–3. **Drive: 9 plays, 88 yards, 5:01.**
- JAX – Tavon Austin 7-yard pass from Trevor Lawrence (pass succeeded), 0:22. Falcons 21–11. **Drive: 9 plays, 72 yards, 3:44.**

**Fourth quarter**

- JAX – Matthew Wright 34-yard field goal, 6:28. Falcons 21–14. **Drive: 14 plays, 74 yards, 6:29.**

**Top passers**

- ATL – Matt Ryan – 19/29, 190 yards, TD, INT
- JAX – Trevor Lawrence – 23/42, 228 yards, TD, INT

**Top rushers**

- ATL – Cordarrelle Patterson – 16 rushes, 108 yards, 2 TD
- JAX – James Robinson – 17 rushes, 86 yards

**Top receivers**

- ATL – Russell Gage – 6 receptions, 62 yards, TD
- JAX – Laquon Treadwell – 4 receptions, 53 yards

==== Week 13: at Los Angeles Rams ====
Week Thirteen: Jacksonville Jaguars at Los Angeles Rams – Game summary

| Quarter | 1 | 2 | 3 | 4 | Total |
|---|---|---|---|---|---|
| Jaguars | 0 | 7 | 0 | 0 | **7** |
| **Rams** | 10 | 6 | 14 | 7 | **37** |

at SoFi Stadium, Inglewood, California

- Date: December 5
- Game time: 4:05 p.m. EST/1:05 p.m. PST
- Game weather: Sunny, 65 °F (18 °C)
- Game attendance: 70,801
- Referee: Clete Blakeman
- TV announcers (Fox): Kevin Kugler, Mark Sanchez and Laura Okmin
- Recap, Game Book

Game information

**First quarter**

- LAR – Matt Gay 40-yard field goal, 12:20. Rams 3–0. **Drive: 6 plays, 12 yards, 2:40.**
- LAR – Sony Michel 5-yard run (Matt Gay kick), 10:25. Rams 10–0. **Drive: 3 plays, 27 yards, 1:21.**

**Second quarter**

- JAX – Carlos Hyde 1-yard run (Matthew Wright kick), 13:23. Rams 10–7. **Drive: 13 plays, 73 yards, 6:32.**
- LAR – Matt Gay 44-yard field goal, 7:41. Rams 13–7. **Drive: 10 plays, 57 yards, 5:42.**
- LAR – Matt Gay 37-yard field goal, 0:19. Rams 16–7. **Drive: 10 plays, 70 yards, 1:56.**

**Third quarter**

- LAR – Cooper Kupp 29-yard pass from Matthew Stafford (Matt Gay kick), 11:43. Rams 23–7. **Drive: 4 plays, 85 yards, 2:18.**
- LAR – Van Jefferson 2-yard pass from Matthew Stafford (Matt Gay kick), 3:27. Rams 30–7. **Drive: 10 plays, 62 yards, 5:09.**

**Fourth quarter**

- LAR – Odell Beckham Jr. 1-yard pass from Matthew Stafford (Matt Gay kick), 10:52. Rams 37–7. **Drive: 10 plays, 55 yards, 5:35.**

**Top passers**

- JAX – Trevor Lawrence – 16/28, 145 yards
- LAR – Matthew Stafford – 26/38, 295 yards, 3 TD

**Top rushers**

- JAX – Carlos Hyde – 9 rushes, 24 yards, TD
- LAR – Sony Michel – 24 rushes, 121 yards, TD

**Top receivers**

- JAX – Laquon Treadwell – 4 receptions, 62 yards
- LAR – Cooper Kupp – 8 receptions, 129 yards, TD

==== Week 14: at Tennessee Titans ====
Week Fourteen: Jacksonville Jaguars at Tennessee Titans – Game summary

| Quarter | 1 | 2 | 3 | 4 | Total |
|---|---|---|---|---|---|
| Jaguars | 0 | 0 | 0 | 0 | **0** |
| **Titans** | 7 | 3 | 7 | 3 | **20** |

at Nissan Stadium, Nashville, Tennessee

- Date: December 12
- Game time: 1:00 p.m. EST/12:00 p.m. CST
- Game weather: Sunny, 44 °F (7 °C)
- Game attendance: 67,808
- Referee: Bill Vinovich
- TV announcers (CBS): Spero Dedes and Jay Feely
- Recap, Game Book

Game information

**First quarter**

- TEN – D'Onta Foreman 5-yard run (Randy Bullock kick), 10:03. Titans 7–0. **Drive: 10 plays, 74 yards, 4:57.**

**Second quarter**

- TEN – Randy Bullock 44-yard field goal, 3:10. Titans 10–0. **Drive: 15 plays, 62 yards, 8:04.**

**Third quarter**

- TEN – Ryan Tannehill 5-yard run (Randy Bullock kick), 2:51. Titans 17–0. **Drive: 11 plays, 69 yards, 5:10.**

**Fourth quarter**

- TEN – Randy Bullock 29-yard field goal, 2:20. Titans 20–0. **Drive: 4 plays, 3 yards, 1:12.**

**Top passers**

- JAX – Trevor Lawrence – 24/40, 221 yards, 4 INT
- TEN – Ryan Tannehill – 20/31, 191 yards

**Top rushers**

- JAX – James Robinson – 6 rushes, 4 yards
- TEN – D'Onta Foreman – 13 rushes, 47 yards, TD

**Top receivers**

- JAX – Marvin Jones – 6 receptions, 70 yards
- TEN – Geoff Swaim – 3 receptions, 45 yards

==== Week 15: vs. Houston Texans ====
Week Fifteen: Houston Texans at Jacksonville Jaguars – Game summary

| Quarter | 1 | 2 | 3 | 4 | Total |
|---|---|---|---|---|---|
| **Texans** | 14 | 6 | 3 | 7 | **30** |
| Jaguars | 3 | 7 | 3 | 3 | **16** |

at TIAA Bank Field, Jacksonville, Florida

- Date: December 19
- Game time: 1:00 p.m. EST
- Game weather: 76 °F (24 °C)
- Game attendance: 60,252
- Referee: Alex Kemp
- TV announcers (CBS): Andrew Catalon, James Lofton and Sherree Burruss
- Recap, Game Book

Game information

**First quarter**

- HOU – Brandin Cooks 22-yard pass from Davis Mills (Kaʻimi Fairbairn kick), 6:39. Texans 7–0. **Drive: 15 plays, 75 yards, 8:21.**
- JAX – Matthew Wright 22-yard field goal, 1:42. Texans 7–3. **Drive: 9 plays, 79 yards, 4:57.**
- HOU – Tremon Smith 98-yard kickoff return (Kaʻimi Fairbairn kick), 1:26. Texans 14–3.

**Second quarter**

- JAX – James Robinson 1-yard run (Matthew Wright kick), 12:09. Texans 14–10. **Drive: 10 plays, 75 yards, 4:17.**
- HOU – Kaʻimi Fairbairn 52-yard field goal, 3:06. Texans 17–10. **Drive: 7 plays, 15 yards, 4:43.**
- HOU – Kaʻimi Fairbairn 51-yard field goal, 0:00. Texans 20–10. **Drive: 5 plays, 29 yards, 0:21.**

**Third quarter**

- HOU – Kaʻimi Fairbairn 25-yard field goal, 10:39. Texans 23–10. **Drive: 7 plays, 40 yards, 2:13.**
- JAX – Matthew Wright 38-yard field goal, 4:47. Texans 23–13. **Drive: 12 plays, 55 yards, 5:52.**

**Fourth quarter**

- JAX – Matthew Wright 35-yard field goal, 11:18. Texans 23–16. **Drive: 4 plays, 5 yards, 2:04.**
- HOU – Brandin Cooks 43-yard pass from Davis Mills (Kaʻimi Fairbairn kick), 2:22. Texans 30–16. **Drive: 6 plays, 55 yards, 2:47.**

**Top passers**

- HOU – Davis Mills – 19/30, 209 yards, 2 TD, INT
- JAX – Trevor Lawrence – 22/38, 210 yards

**Top rushers**

- HOU – Rex Burkhead – 16 rushes, 91 yards
- JAX – James Robinson – 18 rushes, 75 yards, TD

**Top receivers**

- HOU – Brandin Cooks – 7 receptions, 102 yards, 2 TD
- JAX – James O'Shaughnessy – 4 receptions, 60 yards

==== Week 16: at New York Jets ====
Week Sixteen: Jacksonville Jaguars at New York Jets – Game summary

| Quarter | 1 | 2 | 3 | 4 | Total |
|---|---|---|---|---|---|
| Jaguars | 3 | 9 | 3 | 6 | **21** |
| **Jets** | 6 | 7 | 3 | 10 | **26** |

at MetLife Stadium, East Rutherford, New Jersey

- Date: December 26
- Game time: 1:00 p.m. EST
- Game weather: Sunny, 48 °F (9 °C)
- Game attendance: 67,120
- Referee: Tony Corrente
- TV announcers (CBS): Spero Dedes and Jay Feely
- Recap, Game Book

Game information

**First quarter**

- JAX – Matthew Wright 21-yard field goal, 8:12. Jaguars 3–0. **Drive: 12 plays, 73 yards, 6:48.**
- NYJ – Zach Wilson 52-yard run (kick blocked), 3:54. Jets 6–3. **Drive: 8 plays, 91 yards, 4:18.**

**Second quarter**

- JAX – Will Richardson fumble recovery in the end zone (run failed), 13:08. Jaguars 9–6. **Drive: 12 plays, 75 yards, 5:46.**
- NYJ – Braxton Berrios 102–yard kick return (Eddy Piñeiro kick), 12:57. Jets 13–9.
- JAX – Matthew Wright 45-yard field goal, 8:15. Jets 13–12. **Drive: 11 plays, 48 yards, 4:42.**

**Third quarter**

- NYJ – Eddy Piñeiro 42-yard field goal, 9:47. Jets 16–12. **Drive: 9 plays, 48 yards, 5:13.**
- JAX – Matthew Wright 40-yard field goal, 0:25. Jets 16–15. **Drive: 10 plays, 75 yards, 4:39.**

**Fourth quarter**

- NYJ – Conor McDermott 1-yard pass from Zach Wilson (Eddy Piñeiro kick), 9:16. Jets 23–15. **Drive: 11 plays, 80 yards, 6:09.**
- JAX – Dare Ogunbowale 1-yard run (pass failed), 5:25. Jets 23–21. **Drive: 8 plays, 75 yards, 3:51.**
- NYJ – Eddy Piñeiro 20-yard field goal, 1:47. Jets 26–21. **Drive: 10 plays, 67 yards, 3:38.**

**Top passers**

- JAX – Trevor Lawrence – 26/39, 280 yards
- NYJ – Zach Wilson – 14/22, 102 yards, TD

**Top rushers**

- JAX – Dare Ogunbowale – 17 rushes, 57 yards, TD
- NYJ – Michael Carter – 16 rushes, 118 yards

**Top receivers**

- JAX – Marvin Jones – 8 receptions, 74 yards
- NYJ – Braxton Berrios – 5 receptions, 37 yards

==== Week 17: at New England Patriots ====
Week Seventeen: Jacksonville Jaguars at New England Patriots – Game summary

| Quarter | 1 | 2 | 3 | 4 | Total |
|---|---|---|---|---|---|
| Jaguars | 3 | 0 | 0 | 7 | **10** |
| **Patriots** | 7 | 21 | 13 | 9 | **50** |

at Gillette Stadium, Foxborough, Massachusetts

- Date: January 2
- Game time: 1:00 p.m. EST
- Game weather: Cloudy, 46 °F (8 °C)
- Game attendance: 65,878
- Referee: Adrian Hill
- TV announcers (CBS): Andrew Catalon, James Lofton and Amanda Balionis
- Recap, Game Book

Game information

**First quarter**

- NE – Damien Harris 2-yard run (Nick Folk kick), 5:49. Patriots 7–0. **Drive: 11 plays, 70 yards, 7:03.**
- JAX – Matthew Wright 29-yard field goal, 2:18. Patriots 7–3. **Drive: 8 plays, 66 yards, 3:31.**

**Second quarter**

- NE – Damien Harris 7-yard run (Nick Folk kick), 12:02. Patriots 14–3. **Drive: 9 plays, 66 yards, 5:16.**
- NE – Kristian Wilkerson 6-yard pass from Mac Jones (Nick Folk kick), 4:40. Patriots 21–3. **Drive: 7 plays, 33 yards, 3:37.**
- NE – Jakobi Meyers 4-yard pass from Mac Jones (Nick Folk kick), 0:48. Patriots 28–3. **Drive: 6 plays, 43 yards, 1:11.**

**Third quarter**

- NE – Kristian Wilkerson 20-yard pass from Mac Jones (kick blocked), 11:14. Patriots 34–3. **Drive: 6 plays, 77 yards, 3:46.**
- NE – Rhamondre Stevenson 1-yard run (Nick Folk kick), 2:42. Patriots 41–3. **Drive: 1 play, 1 yard, 0:03.**

**Fourth quarter**

- NE – Nick Folk 43-yard field goal, 11:46. Patriots 44–3. **Drive: 11 plays, 53 yards, 4:28.**
- NE – Rhamondre Stevenson 6-yard run (run failed), 7:07. Patriots 50–3. **Drive: 7 plays, 74 yards, 3:46.**
- JAX – Dare Ogunbowale 28-yard pass from Trevor Lawrence (Matthew Wright kick), 3:48. Patriots 50–10. **Drive: 8 plays, 75 yards, 3:19.**

**Top passers**

- JAX – Trevor Lawrence – 17/27, 193 yards, TD, 3 INT
- NE – Mac Jones – 22/30, 227 yards, 3 TD

**Top rushers**

- JAX – Dare Ogunbowale – 9 rushes, 36 yards
- NE – Rhamondre Stevenson – 19 rushes, 107 yards, 2 TD

**Top receivers**

- JAX – Laquon Treadwell – 6 receptions, 87 yards
- NE – Kendrick Bourne – 5 receptions, 76 yards

==== Week 18: vs. Indianapolis Colts ====
Week Eighteen: Indianapolis Colts at Jacksonville Jaguars – Game summary

| Quarter | 1 | 2 | 3 | 4 | Total |
|---|---|---|---|---|---|
| Colts | 0 | 3 | 0 | 8 | **11** |
| **Jaguars** | 7 | 6 | 10 | 3 | **26** |

at TIAA Bank Field, Jacksonville, Florida

- Date: January 9
- Game time: 1:00 p.m. EST
- Game weather: 77 °F (25 °C)
- Game attendance: 60,516
- Referee: Clay Martin
- TV announcers (CBS): Greg Gumbel, Adam Archuleta and AJ Ross
- Recap, Game Book

Game information

**First quarter**

- JAX – Laquon Treadwell 2-yard pass from Trevor Lawrence (Matthew Wright kick), 7:48. Jaguars 7–0. **Drive: 12 plays, 75 yards, 7:12.**

**Second quarter**

- IND – Michael Badgley 41-yard field goal, 9:08. Jaguars 7–3. **Drive: 12 plays, 57 yards, 7:48.**
- JAX – Matthew Wright 22-yard field goal, 3:06. Jaguars 10–3. **Drive: 11 plays, 71 yards, 6:02.**
- JAX – Matthew Wright 20-yard field goal, 0:00. Jaguars 13–3. **Drive: 11 plays, 71 yards, 1:35.**

**Third quarter**

- JAX – Matthew Wright 39-yard field goal, 11:32. Jaguars 16–3. **Drive: 4 plays, 2 yards, 1:01.**
- JAX – Marvin Jones 3-yard pass from Trevor Lawrence (Matthew Wright kick), 3:08. Jaguars 23–3. **Drive: 6 plays, 45 yards, 3:44.**

**Fourth quarter**

- JAX – Matthew Wright 31-yard field goal, 8:15. Jaguars 26–3. **Drive: 6 plays, 28 yards, 1:26.**
- IND – Michael Pittman Jr. 12-yard pass from Carson Wentz (pass succeeded), 4:26. Jaguars 26–11. **Drive: 9 plays, 75 yards, 3:49.**

**Top passers**

- IND – Carson Wentz – 17/29, 185 yards, TD, INT
- JAX – Trevor Lawrence – 23/32, 223 yards, 2 TD

**Top rushers**

- IND – Jonathan Taylor – 15 rushes, 77 yards
- JAX – Ryquell Armstead – 9 rushes, 52 yards

**Top receivers**

- IND – Michael Pittman Jr. – 6 receptions, 64 yards, TD
- JAX – Marvin Jones – 7 receptions, 88 yards, TD

=== Standings ===
==== Division ====
AFC South
| | W | L | T | PCT | DIV | CONF | PF | PA | STK |
|---|---|---|---|---|---|---|---|---|---|
| ^{(1)} Tennessee Titans | 12 | 5 | 0 | .706 | 5–1 | 8–4 | 419 | 354 | W3 |
| Indianapolis Colts | 9 | 8 | 0 | .529 | 3–3 | 7–5 | 451 | 365 | L2 |
| Houston Texans | 4 | 13 | 0 | .235 | 3–3 | 4–8 | 280 | 452 | L2 |
| Jacksonville Jaguars | 3 | 14 | 0 | .176 | 1–5 | 3–9 | 253 | 457 | W1 |

==== Conference ====
AFC
| # | Team | Division | W | L | T | PCT | DIV | CONF | SOS | SOV | STK |
|---|---|---|---|---|---|---|---|---|---|---|---|
**Division winners**
| 1 (Note: Tennessee finished ahead of Kansas City based on head-to-head victory, claiming the No. 1 seed.) | Tennessee Titans | South | 12 | 5 | 0 | .706 | 5–1 | 8–4 | .472 | .480 | W3 |
| 2 | Kansas City Chiefs | West | 12 | 5 | 0 | .706 | 5–1 | 7–5 | .538 | .517 | W1 |
| 3 | Buffalo Bills | East | 11 | 6 | 0 | .647 | 5–1 | 7–5 | .472 | .428 | W4 |
| 4 | Cincinnati Bengals | North | 10 | 7 | 0 | .588 | 4–2 | 8–4 | .472 | .462 | L1 |
**Wild cards**
| 5 (Note: Las Vegas claimed the No. 5 seed over New England based on win percentage in common games (5–1 vs. 2–4 against: Miami, Dallas, LA Chargers, Cleveland, and Indianapolis).) | Las Vegas Raiders | West | 10 | 7 | 0 | .588 | 3–3 | 8–4 | .510 | .515 | W4 |
| 6 | New England Patriots | East | 10 | 7 | 0 | .588 | 3–3 | 8–4 | .481 | .394 | L1 |
| 7 | Pittsburgh Steelers | North | 9 | 7 | 1 | .559 | 4–2 | 7–5 | .521 | .490 | W2 |
**Did not qualify for the postseason**
| 8 (Note: Indianapolis finished ahead of Miami and Los Angeles based on conference record (7–5 vs. 6–6).) | Indianapolis Colts | South | 9 | 8 | 0 | .529 | 3–3 | 7–5 | .495 | .431 | L2 |
| 9 (Note: Miami finished ahead of LA Chargers based on win percentage in common games (5–1 vs. 2–4 against: New England, Las Vegas, Houston, Baltimore, and NY Giants).) | Miami Dolphins | East | 9 | 8 | 0 | .529 | 4–2 | 6–6 | .464 | .379 | W1 |
| 10 | Los Angeles Chargers | West | 9 | 8 | 0 | .529 | 3–3 | 6–6 | .510 | .500 | L1 |
| 11 (Note: Cleveland finished ahead of Baltimore based on division record (3–3 vs. 1–5).) | Cleveland Browns | North | 8 | 9 | 0 | .471 | 3–3 | 5–7 | .514 | .415 | W1 |
| 12 | Baltimore Ravens | North | 8 | 9 | 0 | .471 | 1–5 | 5–7 | .531 | .460 | L6 |
| 13 | Denver Broncos | West | 7 | 10 | 0 | .412 | 1–5 | 3–9 | .484 | .357 | L4 |
| 14 (Note: NY Jets finished ahead of Houston based on head-to-head victory.) | New York Jets | East | 4 | 13 | 0 | .235 | 0–6 | 4–8 | .512 | .426 | L2 |
| 15 | Houston Texans | South | 4 | 13 | 0 | .235 | 3–3 | 4–8 | .498 | .397 | L2 |
| 16 | Jacksonville Jaguars | South | 3 | 14 | 0 | .176 | 1–5 | 3–9 | .512 | .569 | W1 |
**Tiebreakers** (Note: When breaking ties for three or more teams under the NFL's rules, they are first broken within divisions, then comparing only the highest-ranked remaining team from each division.)

== See also ==
- 2007 Atlanta Falcons season and 2022 Denver Broncos season, whose respective head coaches, Bobby Petrino and Nathaniel Hackett, both also lasted less than one season for their teams.
- List of other NFL teams affected by internal conflict
