= Donnie Davis =

American football player (born 1972)

No. 3
- Position: Quarterback

Personal information
- Born: December 16, 1972 (age 53); Winston-Salem, North Carolina, U.S.
- Listed height: 6 ft 2 in (1.88 m)
- Listed weight: 205 lb (93 kg)

Career information
- High school: Cummings (Burlington, North Carolina)
- College: Georgia Tech

Career history
- Arizona Rattlers (1997–1999); Milwaukee Mustangs (2001); Georgia Force (2002–2003)

Awards and highlights
- ArenaBowl champion (1997); ArenaBowl MVP (1997)
- Stats at ArenaFan.com

Donnie Davis (born December 16, 1972) is an American former professional football quarterback who played in the Arena Football League (AFL) for the Arizona Rattlers, Milwaukee Mustangs, and Georgia Force. He started for the Georgia Tech Yellow Jackets in 1993 and 1995.

== College career ==
Davis's college career began in the wake of the 1990 National Championship run under Head Coach Bobby Ross. Davis redshirted in 1991 and would await the graduation of star quarterback Shawn Jones through his redshirt freshman and sophomore seasons. Bobby Ross would leave before Davis's sophomore season and Bill Lewis was appointed head coach. The team, 2 years removed from a National Title, only won five games and finished the 1992 season with a 5–6 record.

His redshirt sophomore campaign began with a thrashing of Furman but over the next three games Georgia Tech would be outscored 102–27. Davis would finish the year with a 5–6 record and a loss to archrival Georgia.

Bill Lewis wanted a spark for his wilting team so he recruited junior college transfer Tom Luginbill from Palomar. Luginbill came in from a wide open pass offense where he tossed for over 7,600 yards and had won 21 games in two years. Luginbill would eventually take the starting job from Davis after Davis got injured in spring practice.

Luginbill's first two starts in 1994 saw Georgia Tech narrowly lose to then top-10 ranked Arizona and winning big over Western Carolina. They would then lose the rest of their games that season, with Luginbill's career ending at Georgia Tech with a 1–10 record. Coach Bill Lewis was fired during the season, and was replaced by defensive coordinator George O'Leary.

After Luginbill transferred to Eastern Kentucky, Davis and O'Leary began a major rebuilding of the Georgia Tech football program that would lead Georgia Tech eventually back to playing in bowls and competing at the highest level in the ACC. Davis over his career compiled an 11–11 record with over 4,000 yards of total offense and 29 total touchdowns.

== Professional career ==
Davis would go on to be one of the most successful passers in Arizona Rattler history. He won the Most Valuable Player of Arena Bowl XI in 1997.

== After football ==
Davis retired from arena football in 2001 and has worked in the mortgage banking industry ever since. Davis plans on graduating from Georgia Tech in 2009 with a Bachelor of Science in Management. He is currently an intern at both the Southern Company and for the Georgia Tech department of athletics, and has also started a LinkedIn group for Georgia Tech football letter winners

== See also ==
- List of Georgia Tech Yellow Jackets starting quarterbacks
- Georgia Tech Yellow Jackets football statistical leaders
