= Will Richardson (American football) =

American football player (born 1996)

No. 76
- Position: Offensive tackle

Personal information
- Born: January 4, 1996 (age 30); Burlington, North Carolina, U.S.
- Listed height: 6 ft 6 in (1.98 m)
- Listed weight: 320 lb (145 kg)

Career information
- High school: Cummings (Burlington)
- College: NC State
- NFL draft: 2018: 4th round, 129th overall pick

Career history
- Jacksonville Jaguars (2018–2021)

Awards and highlights
- Second-team All-ACC (2017)

Career NFL statistics
- Games played: 44
- Games started: 5
- Fumble recoveries: 1
- Total touchdowns: 1
- Stats at Pro Football Reference

Will Richardson Jr. (born January 4, 1996) is an American former professional football player who was an offensive tackle in the National Football League (NFL). He played college football for the North Carolina State Wolfpack.

== Professional career ==
Pre-draft measurables
Height	Weight	Arm length	Hand span	Wingspan	40-yard dash	10-yard split	20-yard split	20-yard shuttle	Three-cone drill	Vertical jump	Broad jump	Bench press
6 ft 5 5/8 in (1.97 m)	306 lb (139 kg)	35 1/4 in (0.90 m)	9 7/8 in (0.25 m)	6 ft 11 1/4 in (2.11 m)	5.26 s	1.84 s	3.04 s	4.83 s	7.80 s	31.5 in (0.80 m)	9 ft 0 in (2.74 m)	16 reps
All values from NFL Combine/Pro Day

Richardson was selected by the Jacksonville Jaguars in the fourth round (129th overall) of the 2018 NFL draft. After missing the first six games with a knee injury, the Jaguars decided to place Richardson on injured reserve on October 20, 2018.

Richardson became a starter for the Jaguars in 2021 after Ben Bartch entered COVID-19 protocols. On December 26, 2021, Richardson scored a touchdown in a 26–21 loss to the New York Jets after he recovered a Trevor Lawrence fumble in the endzone.

On March 16, 2022, Richardson re-signed with the Jaguars. He was released on August 31, 2022.
