= Cartersville High School =

Public school in Georgia, United States

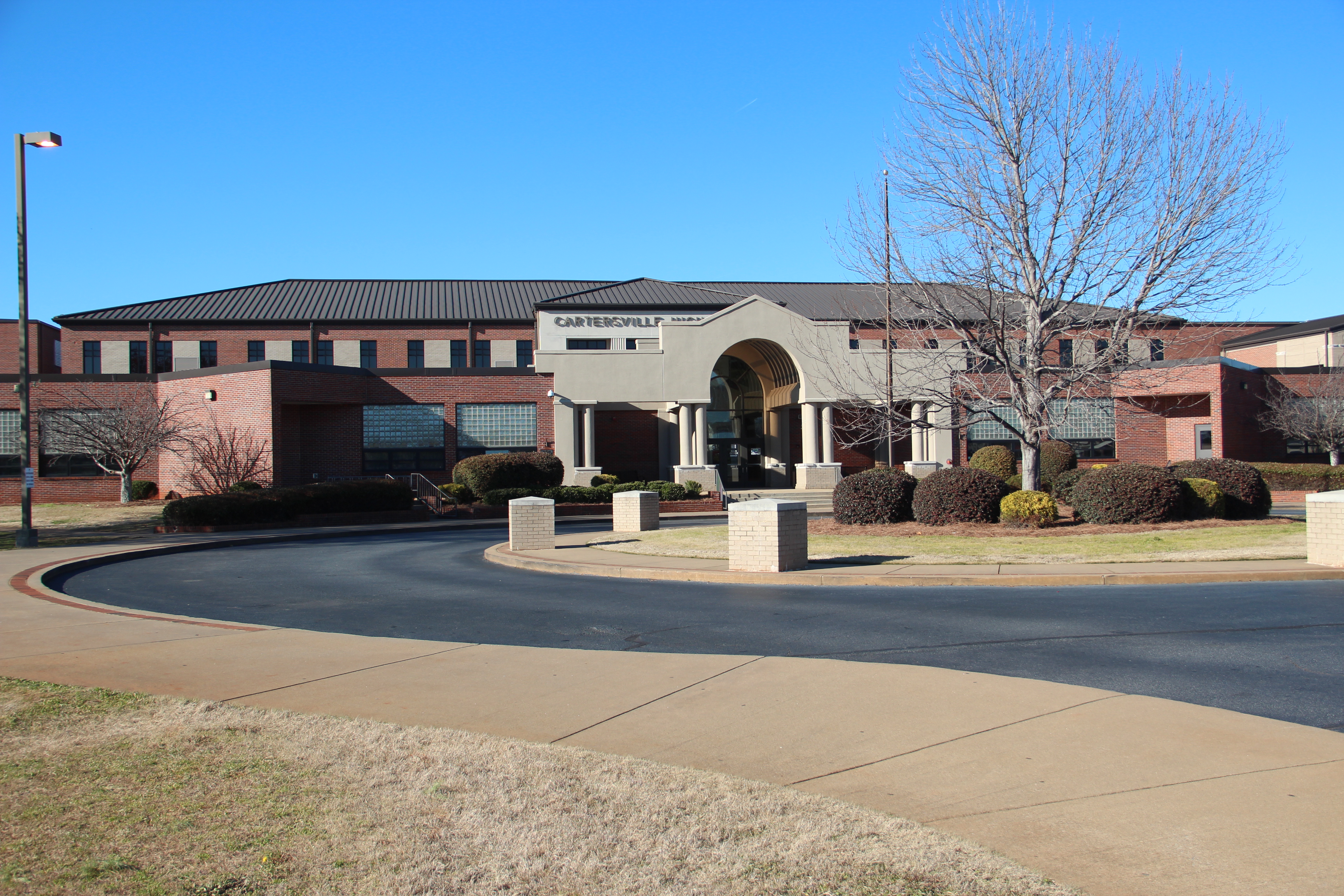

Location
- 320 E Church Street; Cartersville, Georgia 30120; United States; 34°10′12″N 84°47′25″W

Information
- Type: Public secondary
- Established: 1924 (102 years ago)
- School district: John Thompson
- CEEB code: 110615
- Principal: Shelley Tierce
- Teaching staff: 83.70 (FTE)
- Grades: 9-12
- Student to teacher ratio: 16.98
- Colors: Purple and gold
- Team name: Hurricanes
- Rival: Cass High School
- Website: chs.cartersvilleschools.org

Cartersville High School is a public high school in Cartersville, Georgia, United States. It is a part of the Cartersville City School System. It was established in 1924 and teaches grades 9 to 12.

== History ==
Cartersville High School opened in 1924. The high school newspaper, The Chipper, began publication in 1937 and continues until this day.

== Athletics ==
=== Teams ===
Carterville's athletic teams are nicknamed the Hurricanes, and the school's colors are purple and gold. Cartersville teams compete in the following sports:

- Air rifle
- Baseball
- Basketball
- Cross country
- Football
- Golf
- Gymnastics
- Marching band
- Soccer
- Softball
- Swimming
- Tennis
- Track and field
- Volleyball
- Wrestling

=== State championships ===
Baseball

- 2001 AA
- 2002 AA
- 2003 AAA
- 2008 AAA
- 2009 AAA
- 2013 AAA

Cross-country (men's)

- 1993 AA
- 1994 AA
- 2000 AA
- 2001 AA

Football

- 1991 Georgia 2A State Champions
- 1999 Georgia 2A State Champions
- 2015 Georgia 4A State Champions
- 2016 Georgia 4A State Champions

== Notable alumni ==
- Ronnie Brown (2000), former NFL running back, second overall draft pick
- Carlos Del Rio-Wilson (2021), quarterback for the Marshall Thundering Herd
- Andre Fluellen (2003), former NFL defensive lineman
- Miller Forristall (2016), former NFL tight end
- Joe Frank Harris, 78th Governor of the State of Georgia
- Keith Henderson (1985), former NFL running back
- Skip Henderson (1983), former point guard for the Marshall Thundering Herd
- Sam Howard (2011), former MLB pitcher
- Wayne Knight, actor
- Robert Lavette (1981), former NFL running back
- Trevor Lawrence (2018), NFL quarterback, first overall 2021 NFL draft pick for the Jacksonville Jaguars
- Russ Mitchell, former MLB third baseman
- Anthony Seigler (2018), MLB infielder for the Boston Red Sox, 2018 first round draft pick
- Donavan Tate (2009), former baseball outfielder in the San Diego Padres organization, third overall pick of the 2009 MLB draft
