= Hugh M. Cummings High School =

Location
- 2200 North Mebane St. Burlington, North Carolina 27217; United States; 36°05′19″N 79°23′47″W

Information
- Motto: Nulli Secundus (Second to None)
- Established: 1970 (56 years ago)
- School district: Alamance-Burlington School System
- CEEB code: 340508
- Principal: Clifton Thomas (2023–present)
- Faculty: 61.61 (FTE)
- Grades: 9–12
- Enrollment: 813 (2023–24)
- Student to teacher ratio: 15.27
- Schedule type: Block
- Colors: Blue and gold
- Mascot: Cavalier
- Website: www.abss.k12.nc.us/o/hchs

Hugh M. Cummings High School (commonly known as Cummings High School) is a public high school serving grades 9–12 in Burlington, North Carolina, and is a part of the Alamance-Burlington School System. The school opened in 1970 and serves the east side of the city. The school is currently a part of the Mid-State 2A conference.

== Naming ==
The school is named after Hugh M. Cummings, III, who with his wife, donated 77 acres of land to the Burlington City Schools as a site for a Junior and Senior High School.

== Athletics ==
=== Sporting achievements ===
Cummings High School is also the home to multiple team state champions in football, basketball and track.

The Cavaliers brought home four state championships in 2007 alone, winning in football, men's basketball, women's indoor track and women's outdoor track.

The Cavaliers won the NCHSAA 3A state championship in football in 1988, 1990, and 1992. These teams were led by Coach Dave Gutshall and quarterbacks Chuckie Burnette, Donnie Davis, and Ernest Tinnin, who all have their numbers 11, 10, and 15 retired in the schools gymnasium. The football team also won the NCHSAA 2A state championship in 2002 and 2006.

== Notable alumni ==
- Donnie Davis, former American football quarterback
- Will Richardson, former NFL offensive tackle
- Brandon Tate, former NFL wide receiver

== See also ==
- List of high schools in North Carolina
