= Andre Fluellen =

American football player (born 1985)

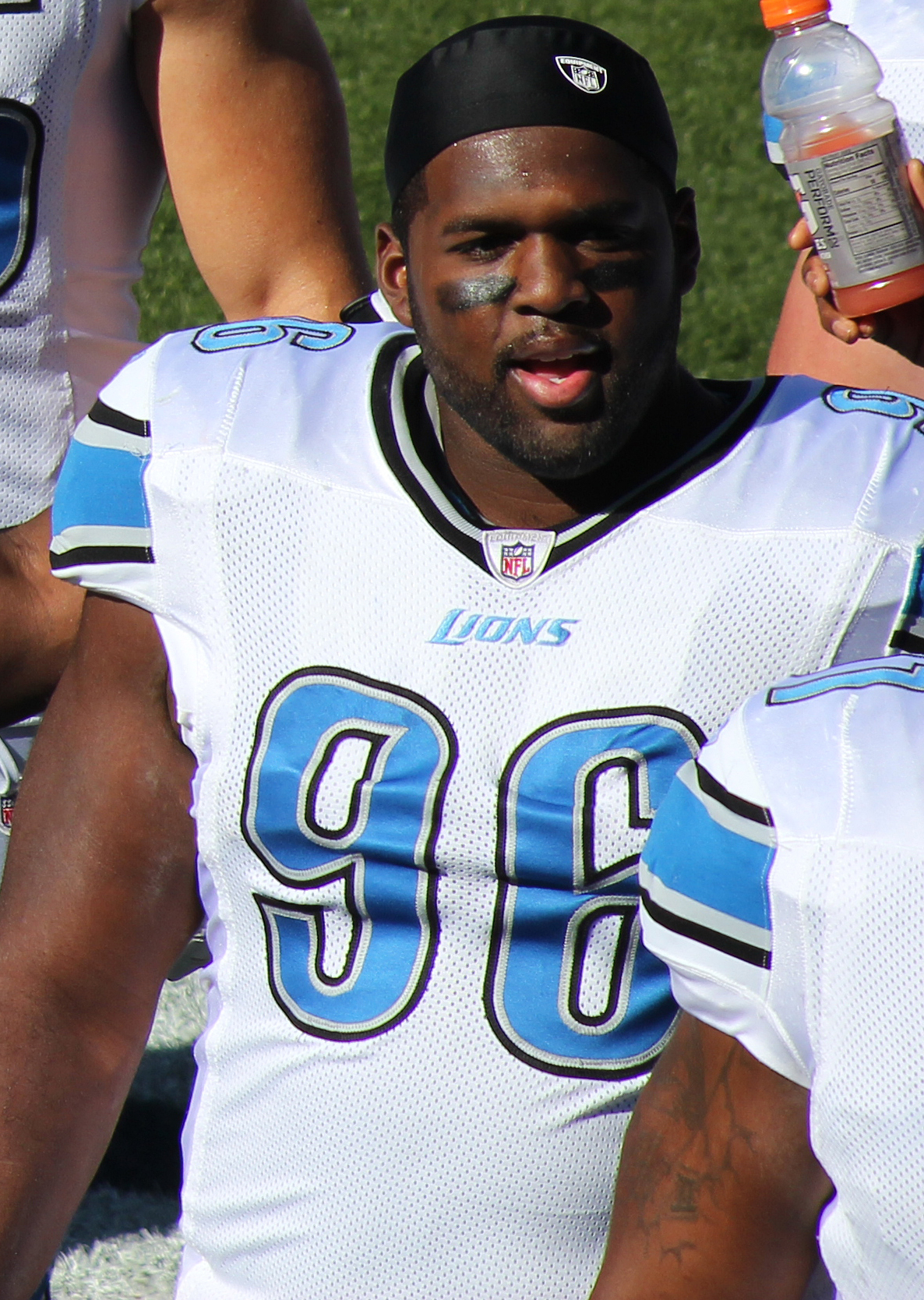
- Fluellen with the Detroit Lions in 2011

No. 79, 93, 96, 90
- Position: Defensive tackle

Personal information
- Born: March 7, 1985 (age 41); Philadelphia, Pennsylvania, U.S.
- Listed height: 6 ft 2 in (1.88 m)
- Listed weight: 302 lb (137 kg)

Career information
- High school: Cartersville (Cartersville, Georgia)
- College: Florida State
- NFL draft: 2008: 3rd round, 87th overall pick

Career history
- Detroit Lions (2008–2011); Miami Dolphins (2012); Detroit Lions (2012); Chicago Bears (2013)*; Detroit Lions (2013–2014); Buffalo Bills (2015); Detroit Lions (2015)
- * Offseason or practice squad member only

Awards and highlights
- Second-team All-ACC (2006)

Career NFL statistics
- Total tackles: 68
- Sacks: 4.5
- Forced fumbles: 1
- Fumble recoveries: 1
- Stats at Pro Football Reference

Andre Fluellen (born March 7, 1985) is an American former professional football player who was a defensive tackle in the National Football League (NFL). He played college football for the Florida State Seminoles and was selected in the third round of the 2008 NFL draft by the Detroit Lions.

== Early life ==
A native of Cartersville, Georgia, Fluellen attended Cartersville High School, where he played on both the offensive and defensive lines. As a junior, he had 88 tackles, 10 sacks, six forced fumbles and scored two touchdowns. In his senior year, he added 93 tackles and 11 sacks. Regarded as a three-star recruit by Rivals.com, Fluellen was ranked the No. 28 defensive tackle prospect in a class highlighted by the sole five-star Nate Robinson. After official visits to Vanderbilt, Florida, Auburn, and Florida State, Fluellen chose the Seminoles.

== College career ==
After redshirting his initial year at Florida State, Fluellen appeared in all 12 games of the 2004 season. Serving as a back-up to Brodrick Bunkley, he finished the year with six tackles, including one for loss, and two pass breakups. Against both Miami (FL) and Duke he recorded two tackles each. In his sophomore season, Fluellen replaced Travis Johnson at defensive tackle. Recording 26 tackles on the year, he ranked second on the team behind Bunkley for most tackles by a defensive lineman. Fluellen also had 7.5 tackles for loss, and tied for third on the team in quarterback hurries with twelve. Season-highs in both tackles (eight) and tackles for loss (two) he recorded against North Carolina State.

As a junior, Fluellen faced the task of replacing Bunkley at the nose guard position, named one of the “ten toughest vacancies” in college football. Bunkley's original successor, junior college transfer Paul Griffin, tore the anterior cruciate ligament in his left knee in the first quarter against Troy, the second game of the season. Fluellen was moved to his position, and started at nose guard for the remainder of the season. He finished seventh on the team in tackles, and first among all defensive lineman, in tackles with a career-high 28 stops. Fluellen also had eight tackles for minus yardage (fourth on the team).

On the eve of his senior season, Fluellen was named one of the “ten seniors to watch in '07” by ESPN. He was named to several preseason All-American and All-Atlantic Coast Conference teams, but managed to start only five games, missing three entire contests due to a left elbow hyperextension. He ended the season with 21 tackles (10 solos), including two sacks, one pressure and a pair of pass deflections.

== Professional career ==
=== Pre-draft ===
After his injury-plagued senior campaign, Fluellen's draft stock plummeted. In their pre-draft coverage, Sports Illustrated projected him to be a sixth-round draft choice.

=== Detroit Lions (first stint) ===
Fluellen was selected by the Detroit Lions in the third round of the 2008 NFL draft, 87th overall, using the third round pick acquired in a trade with the Cleveland Browns.

In four years with the Lions, Fluellen played 51 games, recording 48 tackles and 2.5 sacks, starting five times. He was released by the Lions on August 31, 2012 in one of their final roster cuts of the 2012 preseason.

=== Miami Dolphins ===
Fluellen was signed by the Miami Dolphins on September 19, 2012. He was to have a reserve role in place of the injured reserve player Tony McDaniel. He played two games with the Dolphins, who released Fluellen on October 2, upon McDaniel's return to the active roster.

=== Detroit Lions (second stint) ===
Fluellen signed with the Lions on December 11, 2012. He played in three games, starting one, and totaled six tackles.

=== Chicago Bears ===
On April 9, 2013, Fluellen was signed by the Chicago Bears. Fluellen was released by the Bears on May 20.

=== Detroit Lions (third stint) ===
On July 26, 2013, Fluellen was signed by the Lions, marking the third time in his career that he joined the team. On August 31, Fluellen was cut by the Lions organization in the effort to finalize the 53-man roster. In September, he was re-signed by the Lions. In 8 games in 2014, he totaled 10 tackles and a career-high 2.0 sacks.

=== Buffalo Bills ===
On June 16, 2015, Fluellen signed a contract with the Buffalo Bills. For final roster cuts, he was released on September 4, but re-signed with the team on September 7 and was cut from the team once again on September 11. Fluellen was then re-signed to the active roster the following day.

=== Detroit Lions (fourth stint) ===
On October 7, 2015, Fluellen was signed by the Detroit Lions after Tyrunn Walker was placed on injured reserve; was the ninth time Fluellen had signed with the Lions. On December 9, Fluellen was released from the injured reserve list by the Lions.
