= Brandon Tate =

American football player (born 1987)

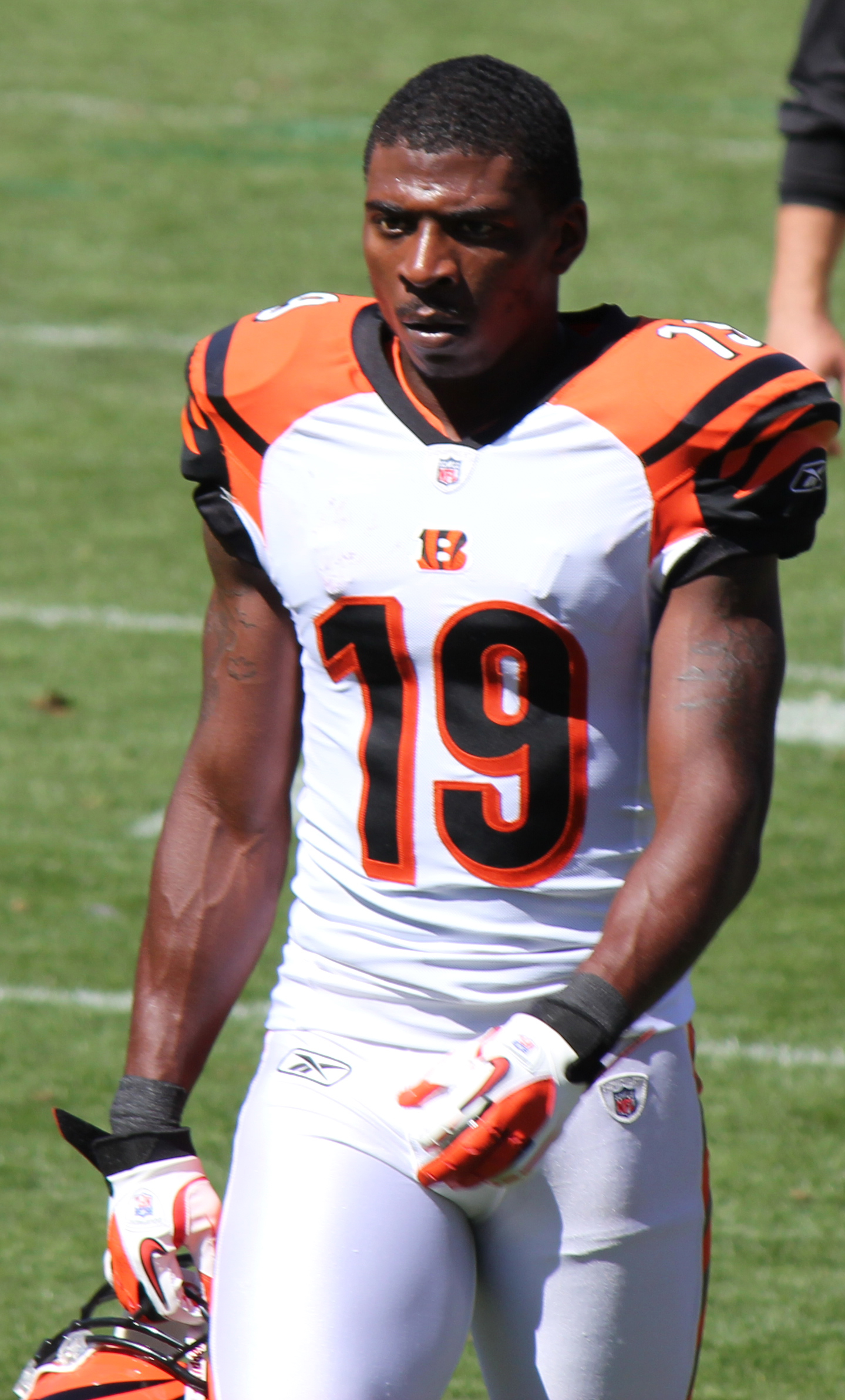
- Tate with the Cincinnati Bengals in 2011

No. 19, 15, 87
- Position: Wide receiver

Personal information
- Born: October 5, 1987 (age 39); Burlington, North Carolina, U.S.
- Listed height: 6 ft 1 in (1.85 m)
- Listed weight: 195 lb (88 kg)

Career information
- High school: Cummings (Burlington, North Carolina)
- College: North Carolina (2005–2008)
- NFL draft: 2009: 3rd round, 83rd overall pick

Career history
- New England Patriots (2009–2010); Cincinnati Bengals (2011–2015); Buffalo Bills (2016–2017); New Orleans Saints (2018)

Awards and highlights
- NCAA career record combined return yards (3,523)

Career NFL statistics
- Receptions: 71
- Receiving yards: 1,099
- Return yards: 7,814
- Total touchdowns: 10
- Stats at Pro Football Reference

Brandon Tate (born October 5, 1987) is an American former professional football player who was a wide receiver in the National Football League (NFL). He was selected by the New England Patriots in the third round of the 2009 NFL draft. He played college football for the North Carolina Tar Heels.

== Early life and family ==
Tate attended Hugh M. Cummings High School in Burlington, North Carolina, where he played football as a wide receiver, kick returner, and defensive back and basketball as a guard. In basketball, he won a state title in his junior season. In his 2004 senior football season, Tate had 66 receptions and 18 touchdowns, earning All-Conference honors.

Tate's brother, Barry, was a four-year letterwinner for Lenoir-Rhyne University in football.

== College career ==
After high school, Tate attended the University of North Carolina at Chapel Hill. Tate was one of seven true freshman to see game time. Tate played in all eleven games as a kick returner. In the Tar Heels game against the Utah Utes, Tate returned the opening kickoff 96 yards for a touchdown. Tate finished the season with 21 kick returns for 542 yards, and 29 punt returns for 267 yards. Tate finished 22nd in the country in kick off returns. In his freshman season, Tate finished second in the Atlantic Coast Conference in kick returns and third in punt returns.

In his sophomore season, Tate was one of only three players in the country to return two kickoffs for touchdowns. Brandon Tate caught his first pass from Cameron Sexton, in the Tar Heels game against the Virginia Tech Hokies. The pass was for 13 yards, with the catch happening just before the end of the first half. In the Tar Heels' game against Notre Dame, Tate returned a kick off 90 yards for a touchdown. Tate faked a pitch to teammate Quinton Person, and bolted down the field into the end zone. In the final game of the Tar Heels season, against Duke, Tate performed very well. With seventeen seconds remaining in the first half of the game, Tate returned a kick off 97 yards for a touchdown. That 97-yard return tied third longest return in North Carolina's history. Early in the fourth quarter, Tate returned a punt 54 yards for a touchdown. Tate became the third person in North Carolina football history and the ninth player in NCAA history to return a kickoff and a punt for a touchdown in the same game. Tate caught his first pass, a 17-yard reception, from Cameron Sexton.

In the opening game of Tate's junior season against James Madison, he caught his first touchdown pass of his career. Tate caught a 28-yard pass for his first catch of the season, as well as his first touchdown of his career. When North Carolina squared off against East Carolina, Tate returned a punt 58 yards for a touchdown. This was Tate's fifth career return for a touchdown, which tied the school record; which was held by Charlie Justice. In North Carolina's game against NC State, Brandon Tate recorded 168 all-purpose yards. He caught a 50-yard touchdown pass from Bobby Rome, a fullback, off of a flea flicker. In the Tar Heels' games against Wake Forest and Miami, Tate had over 200 all-purpose yards. In the Heels' game against Miami, Tate scored a 54-yard rushing touchdown off of a reverse. Tate set the ACC records for most all-purpose yards (2,382 yards) and most kick off returns (98) during his junior season. Tate saw more time at wide receiver in his junior season in 2007. Tate finished the season first in the ACC with 1,765 all-purpose yards; he also led his team with seven touchdowns. Tate caught 25 passes for 479 yards, averaging 19.2 yards per catch. In addition to that, Tate caught five touchdown passes. Tate averaged 24.1 for kick off returns and 9.4 yards for punt

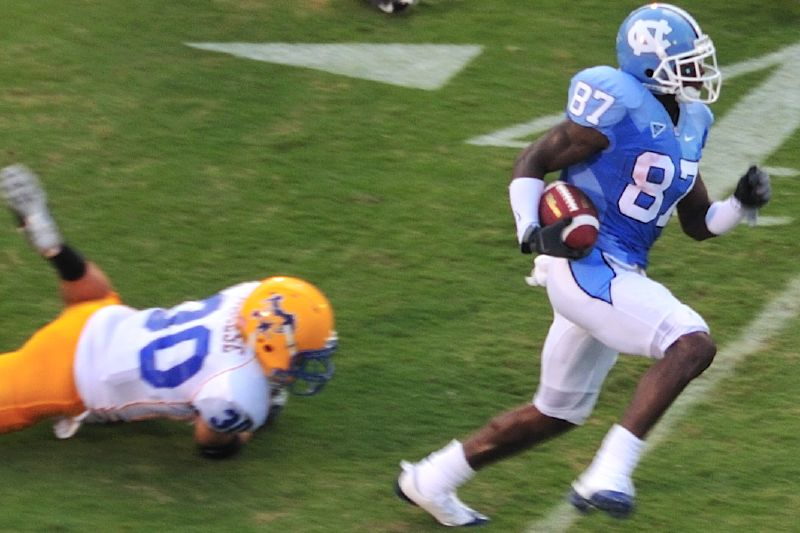
Tate during a game with North Carolina in 2008.

In Tate's senior year, the Tar Heels were pitted against the McNeese State for their opening game of the collegiate football season. Tate dominated the game. In the first quarter of the game, Tate returned a punt 82 yards for a touchdown. Shortly after the start of the second quarter, Tate rushed 54 yards, being tackled just three yards shy of the end zone. In the third quarter of the game, Tate caught a 57-yard pass from T. J. Yates and ran for a touchdown. Tate ended up rushing for 106 yards, becoming the first North Carolina wide receiver to have a hundred-yard rushing game. Tate set a school record for most all-purpose yards in a game with 397 yards on just eleven touches. Tate also set the school record for highest punt return average in a game, with 47.3 yards per return (3 returns for 142 yards). In the Tar Heels' game against Miami, Tate set the NCAA record for most combined kick off and punt return yards in a career. He would finish the season with 3,523 total career return yards to his name. Before the Tar Heels' game against Notre Dame, Tate needed only 165 yards to become the eleventh player in NCAA history to reach 1,000 kick off return yards and 1,000 punt return yards. Tate returned a single punt for 9 yards, before leaving the game with a knee injury. Tate ended up tearing his ACL and MCL in his knee and missed the final seven games of the season. Tate also the ACC's all-time leader in kickoff returns (109) and kickoff return yardage (2,688).

== Professional career ==
Pre-draft measurables
Height	Weight	40-yard dash	10-yard split	20-yard split	20-yard shuttle	Three-cone drill	Vertical jump	Broad jump
5 ft 11 7/8 in (1.83 m)	183 lb (83 kg)	4.52 s	1.60 s	2.65 s	4.12 s	7.25 s	36 in (0.91 m)	9 ft 4 in (2.84 m)
All values from North Carolina Pro Day

=== New England Patriots ===
==== 2009 season ====
Tate was selected by the Patriots in the third round (83rd overall) of the 2009 NFL draft. On July 16, he was signed to a four-year contract with a $755,000 signing bonus. He began the 2009 season on the non-football injury list, still recovering from his knee injury from the prior season. He was activated on October 24, in Week 7. He played that week against the Tampa Bay Buccaneers as a reserve, recording one rush (an end-around) for 11 yards. Two weeks later, following the team's bye week, Tate started against the Miami Dolphins but did not have any catches in the game. Tate suffered another knee injury in the game and was placed on injured reserve on November 14, ending his season. He finished the season with 106 kickoff return yards.

==== 2010 season ====
On September 12, 2010, in the Patriots' season-opening game against the Cincinnati Bengals, Tate ran the opening second-half kickoff back 97 yards for a touchdown. On October 4, 2010, Tate repeated the feat against the Miami Dolphins, this time returning the ball 103 yards. Tate scored his first career receiving touchdown on a 65-yard catch against the Minnesota Vikings in Week 8.

Tate played in 16 games, of which he started 10. He caught 24 passes for 432 yards and three touchdowns, and had 41 kick returns for 1,057 yards (25.8 yard average) and two touchdowns.

On September 3, 2011, the New England Patriots released Tate.

=== Cincinnati Bengals ===
On September 4, 2011, the Cincinnati Bengals claimed Tate off waivers. On October 30, 2011, Tate returned a punt for a 56-yard touchdown against the Seattle Seahawks, his first touchdown with the Bengals. On March 11, 2014, Tate re-signed with the Bengals.

Tate was re-signed by the Bengals on April 1, 2015, on a one-year contract. He recorded his first reception as a Bengal in a Week 1 loss to the Baltimore Ravens, he subsequently recorded his first receiving touchdown as a Bengal on a 44-yard reception from Andy Dalton in a Week Two 34–27 victory against the Cleveland Browns. The Bengals re-signed Tate to another one-year contract on March 4, 2016. During the season, Tate surpassed Mike Martin to become the Bengals all-time punt return yard leader.

Tate was released by the Bengals on August 30, 2016, having been beaten out for the primary return man role by undrafted rookie Alex Erickson. He left the team as the all-time leader in combined kick and punt return yards with 4,928 yards.

=== Buffalo Bills ===
Tate signed with the Buffalo Bills on September 6, 2016.

On March 20, 2017, Tate re-signed with the Bills.

=== New Orleans Saints ===
On July 31, 2018, Tate signed with the New Orleans Saints. He was released on September 1, 2018, as part of final roster cuts. He was re-signed on September 26, 2018, but was released six days later.
