= Trevor Lawrence =

American football player (born 1999)

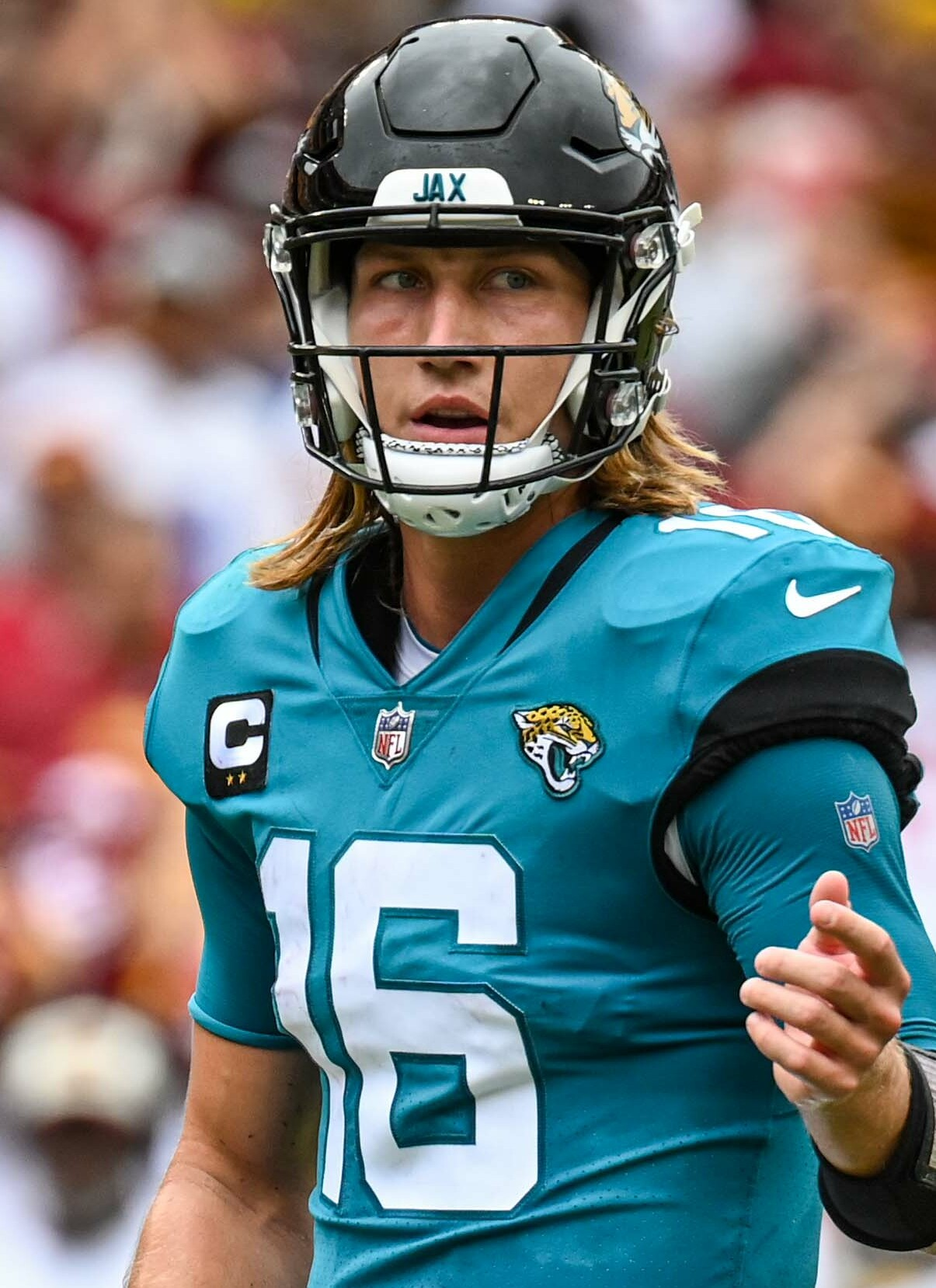
- Lawrence with the Jacksonville Jaguars in 2022

No. 16 – Jacksonville Jaguars
- Position: Quarterback
- Roster status: Active

Personal information
- Born: October 6, 1999 (age 27); Knoxville, Tennessee, U.S.
- Listed height: 6 ft 6 in (1.98 m)
- Listed weight: 220 lb (100 kg)

Career information
- High school: Cartersville (Cartersville, Georgia)
- College: Clemson (2018–2020)
- NFL draft: 2021: 1st round, 1st overall pick

Career history
- Jacksonville Jaguars (2021–present)

Awards and highlights
- Pro Bowl (2022); CFP national champion (2018); CFP National Championship Game Offensive MVP (2019); Archie Griffin Award (2018); ACC Athlete of the Year (2021); ACC Player of the Year (2020); ACC Offensive Player of the Year (2020); ACC Offensive Rookie of the Year (2018); First-team All-American (2020); 2× First-team All-ACC (2019, 2020); Second-team All-ACC (2018)

Career NFL statistics as of Week 10, 2026
- Passing attempts: 2,853
- Passing completions: 1,800
- Completion percentage: 63.1%
- TD–INT: 119–63
- Passing yards: 20,106
- Passer rating: 88.7
- Rushing yards: 1,548
- Rushing touchdowns: 23
- Stats at Pro Football Reference

William Trevor Lawrence (born October 6, 1999) is an American professional football quarterback for the Jacksonville Jaguars of the National Football League (NFL). Considered among the highest-touted college football prospects, he won the 2019 National Championship Game as a freshman with the Clemson Tigers and set the school's record for quarterback wins. Lawrence was selected first overall by the Jaguars in the 2021 NFL draft. In his second season, Lawrence led the Jaguars to their first division title since 2017 and earned Pro Bowl honors. He led the team to another division title in 2025.

== Early life ==
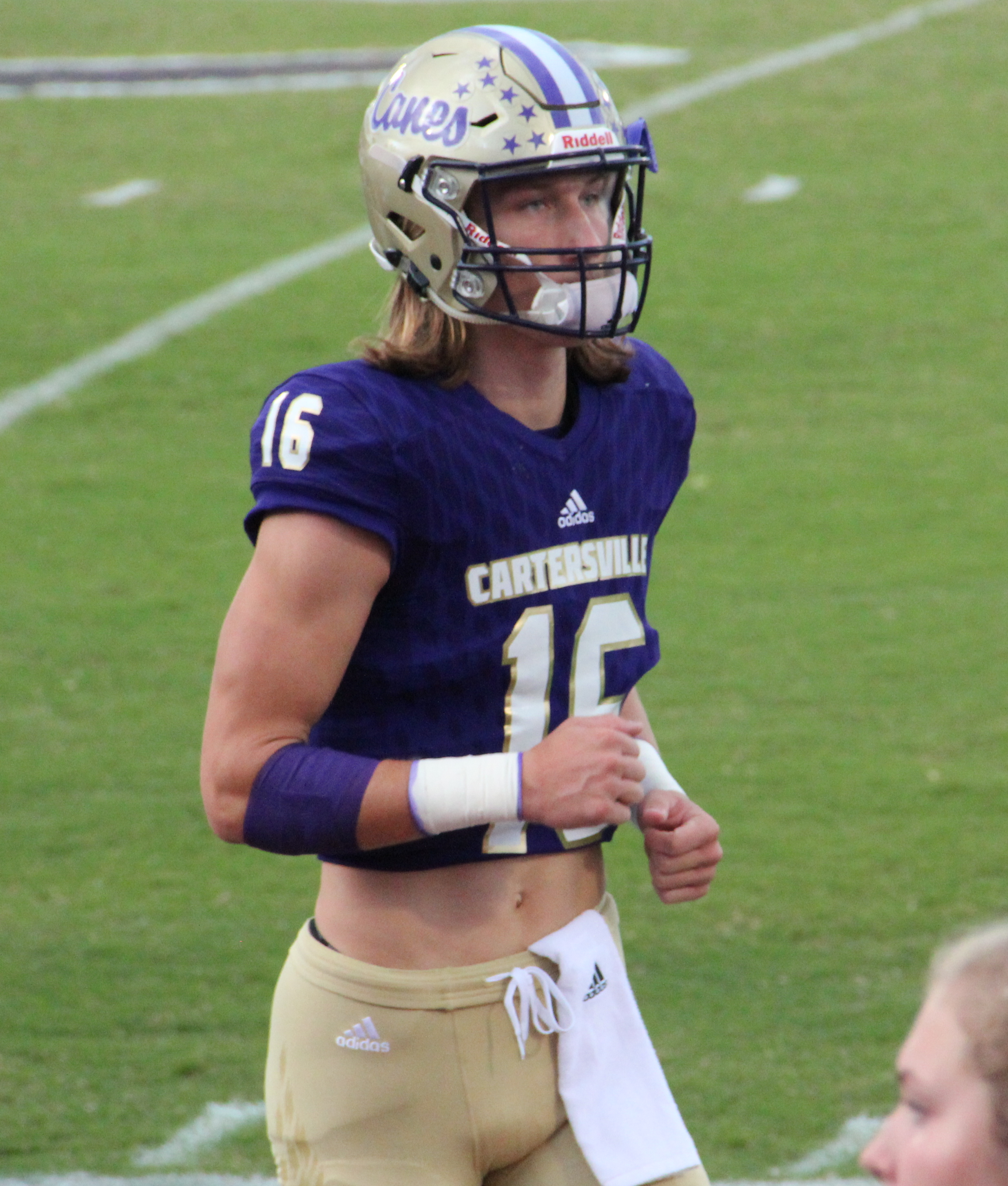
Lawrence at Cartersville High School in 2017

William Trevor Lawrence was born in Knoxville, Tennessee on October 6, 1999, and moved to Cartersville, Georgia when he was six. He later attended Cartersville High School, where he played football and basketball. As a junior in 2016, Lawrence was The Atlanta Journal-Constitution player of the year after completing 250 of 406 passes for 3,904 yards and 51 touchdowns. As a freshman, Lawrence had 3,042 yards and 26 touchdowns, and as a sophomore, he passed for 3,655 yards and 43 touchdowns.

From his sophomore year to his senior year, Lawrence led the Purple Hurricanes to 41 straight victories, winning two state championships and four region titles while also receiving numerous national high school player of the year honors. In 2017, Lawrence broke the Georgia state record for passing yards and passing touchdowns, which were previously held by Deshaun Watson of Gainesville, who also played for Clemson.

Lawrence was a five-star recruit who was regarded as one of the best high school quarterback prospects of all time. On December 16, 2016, he committed to Clemson University to play college football.

College recruiting
Name	Hometown	School	Height	Weight	Commit date
Trevor Lawrence; QB	Cartersville, Georgia	Cartersville High School	6 ft 6 in (1.98 m)	208 lb (94 kg)	Dec 16, 2016
Trevor Lawrence; QB	Recruit ratings: Scout: Rivals: 247Sports: ESPN:				
Overall recruit ranking:
Note: In many cases, Scout, Rivals, 247Sports, On3, and ESPN may conflict in their listings of height and weight.; In these cases, the average was taken. ESPN grades are on a 100-point scale.; Sources: "2018 Team Ranking". Rivals.com.

== College career ==
=== Freshman year ===
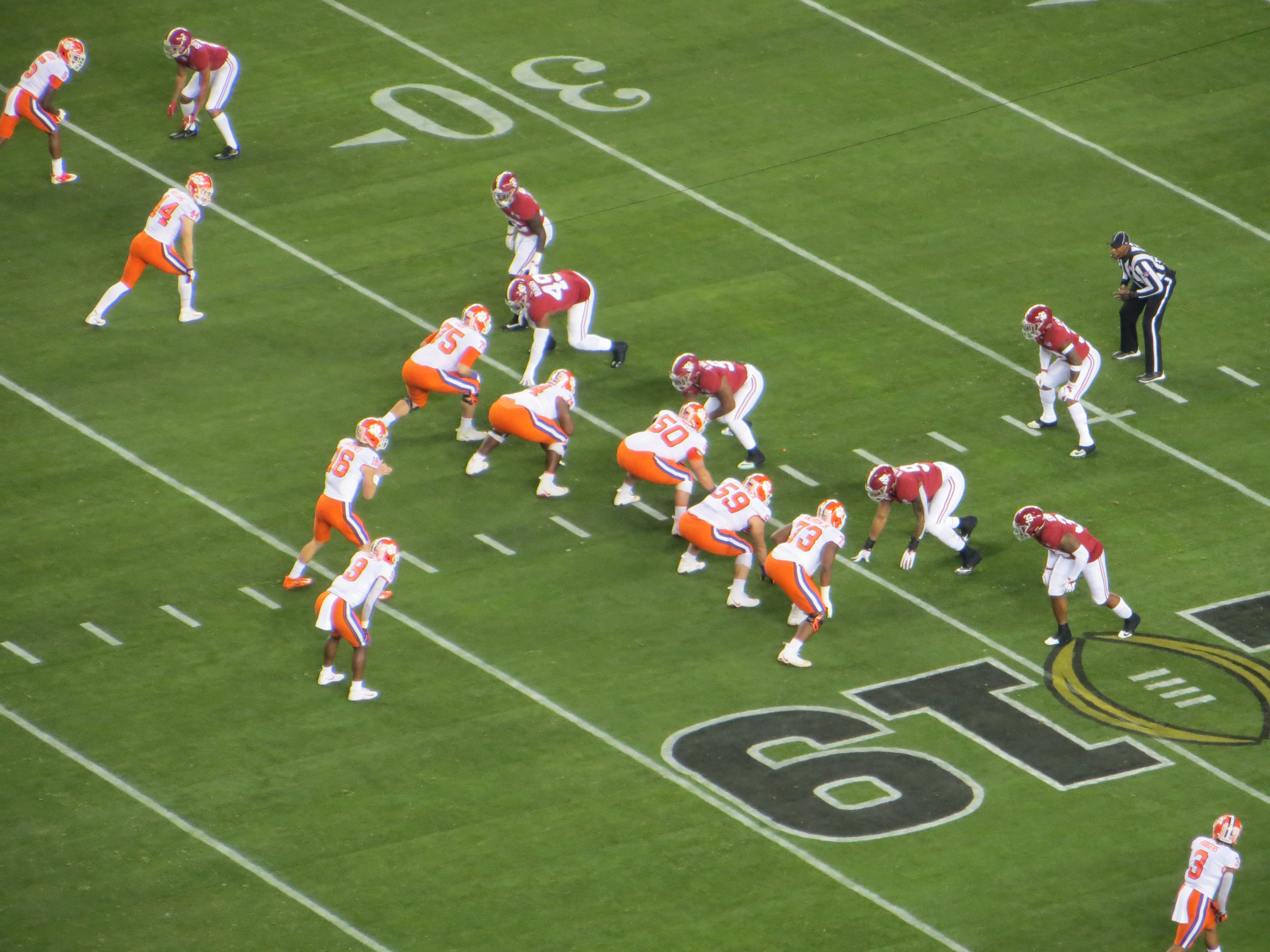
Lawrence (#16) during the 2019 College Football Playoff National Championship

Lawrence started his freshman season behind Kelly Bryant on Clemson's depth chart, but was given equal playing time in the season's first games. Head coach Dabo Swinney named Lawrence the new starter after four games, after which Bryant announced his intention to transfer schools. Lawrence led Clemson to an undefeated regular season, a 42–10 victory over Pittsburgh in the ACC Championship Game, and a bid to play in the College Football Playoff. The Tigers were ranked No. 2 in the College Football Playoff rankings, and defeated No. 3 Notre Dame, 30–3, in the 2018 Cotton Bowl Classic. They advanced to the 2019 College Football Playoff National Championship game, where they defeated Alabama, 44–16, handing the Crimson Tide their worst loss of the Nick Saban era. Lawrence was named Offensive MVP of the game and became the first true freshman quarterback to start for a national champion since Jamelle Holieway in 1985 for Oklahoma.

Lawrence threw for 3,280 passing yards and 30 touchdowns on the season, and was awarded the National Freshman of the Year and Archie Griffin Award by the Touchdown Club of Columbus. He was also awarded ACC Rookie of the Year honors.

=== Sophomore year ===
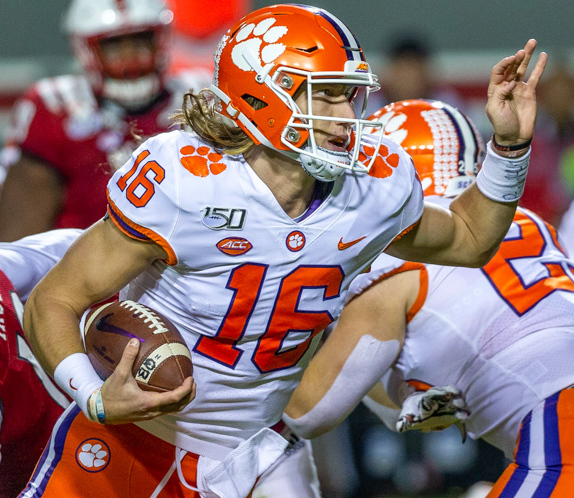
Lawrence in 2019

Returning for his sophomore year with the Tigers, Lawrence was named preseason ACC Player of the Year and was considered a leading candidate for the Heisman Trophy. Relatively inconsistent play in the early part of the season all but lost Lawrence the Heisman Trophy race, but he led FBS in passer rating over the final half of the regular season and ended seventh in Heisman Trophy voting. Lawrence helped lead Clemson to an undefeated regular season and an ACC Championship Game victory over Virginia, which gave them the No. 3 ranking in the final College Football Playoff rankings. In the 2019 Fiesta Bowl against Ohio State, he had 259 passing yards and two touchdowns to go along with 16 rushes for 107 yards and a touchdown in the 29–23 victory that brought them to the national championship game for the second consecutive year. Lawrence lost the first game of his career in the CFP Championship Game against LSU, as Clemson snapped its 29-game winning streak and lost 42–25. Lawrence posted the worst passer rating of his career as he only completed 18 of 37 passes for 234 yards in the game.

=== Junior year ===
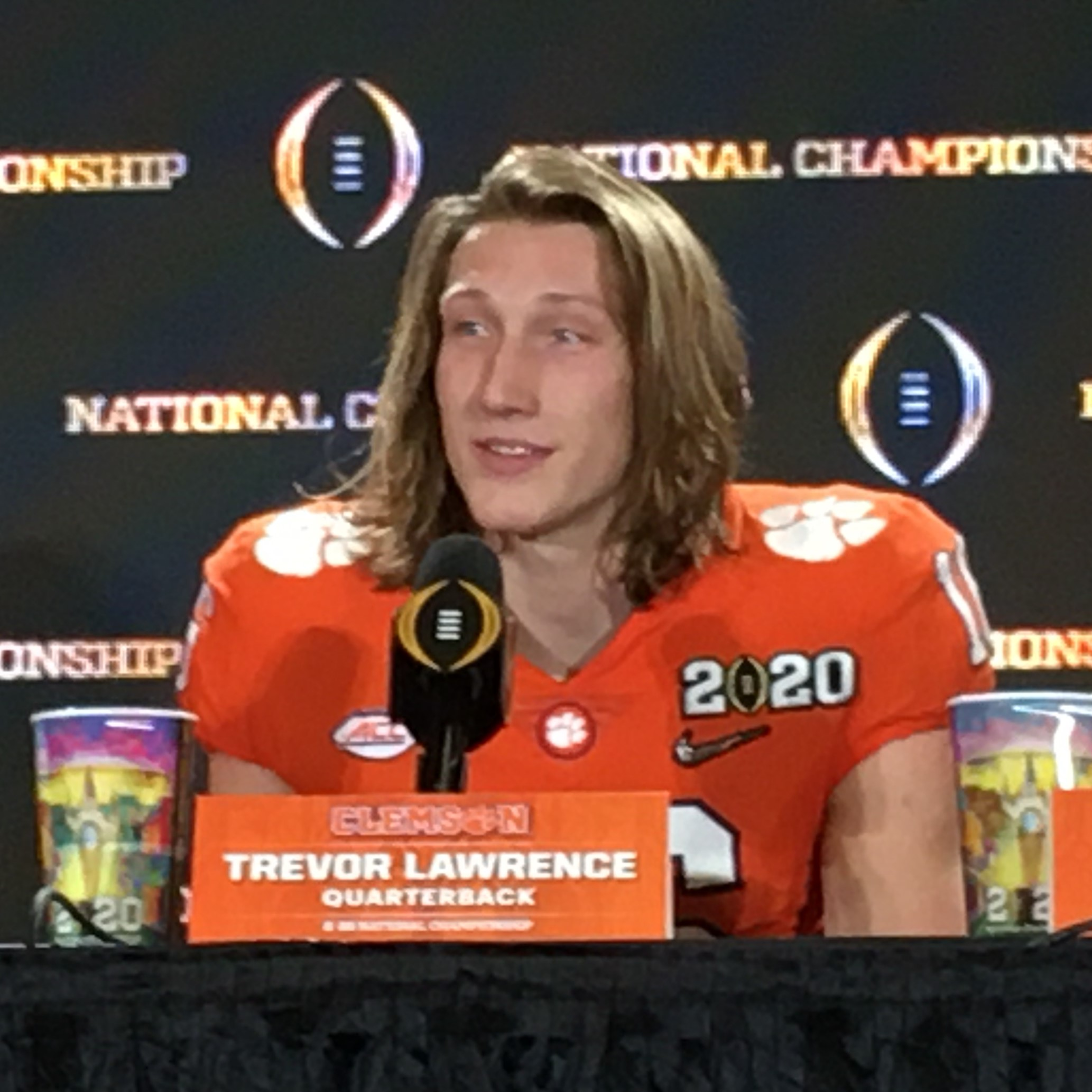
Lawrence at a press conference following the 2020 College Football Playoff National Championship

Lawrence returned for his junior season with the Tigers. In his first six games of the season, Lawrence threw for 1,833 passing yards with 17 touchdowns and two interceptions. On October 30, 2020, Lawrence tested positive for COVID-19, which resulted in a 10-day quarantine, per ACC protocols. As a result, he missed two games before returning. Clemson lost one of those two games, to Notre Dame. After Lawrence returned to the team, he helped guide the Tigers back to the ACC Championship Game by finishing in second in the division-less format adopted for the 2020 season. They defeated Notre Dame in the rematch in the conference title game with Lawrence starting at quarterback and were selected to a spot in the College Football Playoff. In the CFP semifinal, the Sugar Bowl, Lawrence and the Tigers lost to Ohio State.

Lawrence finished his final season with the Tigers 231-of-334 for 3,153 passing yards with 24 touchdowns and five interceptions. He was named ACC Player of the Year, and finished in second in voting for the Heisman Trophy behind Alabama wide receiver DeVonta Smith. After the season, Lawrence would be the men's recipient of the ACC Athlete of the Year award across all conference sports, sharing honors with women's recipient Charlotte North of Boston College lacrosse.

== Professional career ==
=== Pre-draft ===
Pre-draft measurables
Height	Weight	Arm length	Hand span	Wingspan
6 ft 5 5/8 in (1.97 m)	213 lb (97 kg)	31 1/2 in (0.80 m)	10 in (0.25 m)	6 ft 6 1/4 in (1.99 m)
All values from Pro Day

One of the NFL's highest-regarded amateur prospects, Lawrence was nearly unanimously projected to be taken first overall in the 2021 NFL draft. He drew comparisons to Pro Football Hall of Fame quarterbacks John Elway and Peyton Manning and 2012 first overall pick Andrew Luck, with the slogan "Tank for Trevor" gaining popularity among fans of struggling teams. ESPN's Mel Kiper Jr. ranked Lawrence as the fourth highest-graded quarterback he had ever evaluated, behind Elway, Luck, and Manning.

=== 2021 ===
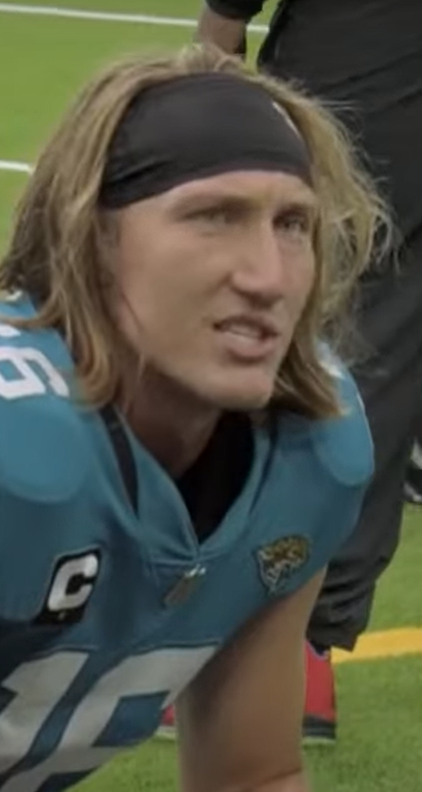
Lawrence in 2021

After undergoing surgery to repair a torn labrum in his left shoulder, Lawrence was officially selected first overall by the Jacksonville Jaguars, which had finished with a league-worst 1–15 record the previous season. On July 5, 2021, he signed his four-year rookie contract, worth $36.8 million with a $24.1 million signing bonus.

Ahead of the final week of preseason, Lawrence was named the Jaguars' starting quarterback for 2021. Making his NFL debut in the season-opener against the Houston Texans, Lawrence finished with 332 passing yards, three touchdowns, and three interceptions during the 37–21 road loss. The loss was Lawrence's first in a regular season game. In the next game against the Denver Broncos, he threw a touchdown pass on the opening drive, but completed only eight of 25 passes afterwards and was intercepted twice as the Jaguars lost 23–13. Two weeks later against the Cincinnati Bengals on Thursday Night Football, Lawrence had a stronger performance, completing 17 of 24 passes for 204 yards and scored his first rushing touchdown, also making it his first NFL game without an interception. Despite his efforts, the Jaguars lost on the road 24–21.

Lawrence won his first NFL game in Week 6 against the Miami Dolphins, throwing for 319 yards and a touchdown during the 23–20 victory. Having played the game at Tottenham Hotspur Stadium, Lawrence became the first NFL rookie to win in London. The victory was also the Jaguars' first since Week 1 of the 2020 season, ending a 20-game losing streak.

Following a Week 8 31–7 road loss to the Seattle Seahawks, Lawrence took part in the season's biggest upset when he helped the 15.5-point underdog Jaguars defeat the Buffalo Bills 9–6. However, the victory began a stretch that saw Lawrence throw only two touchdown passes in nine games, including seven games without any touchdowns, while having eight interceptions. The Jaguars also went on an eight-game losing streak, dropping them to the league's worst record for a second consecutive year. Nevertheless, Lawrence concluded the season with his strongest performance in the regular season finale, completing 23-of-32 passes for 223 yards and two touchdowns to secure a 26–11 victory over the Indianapolis Colts.

Lawrence finished his rookie year with 3,641 passing yards, 12 touchdowns, and a league-leading 17 interceptions to go along with 73 carries for 334 yards and two touchdowns. Lawrence's passing yards ranked second for rookies, only behind Mac Jones.

=== 2022 ===
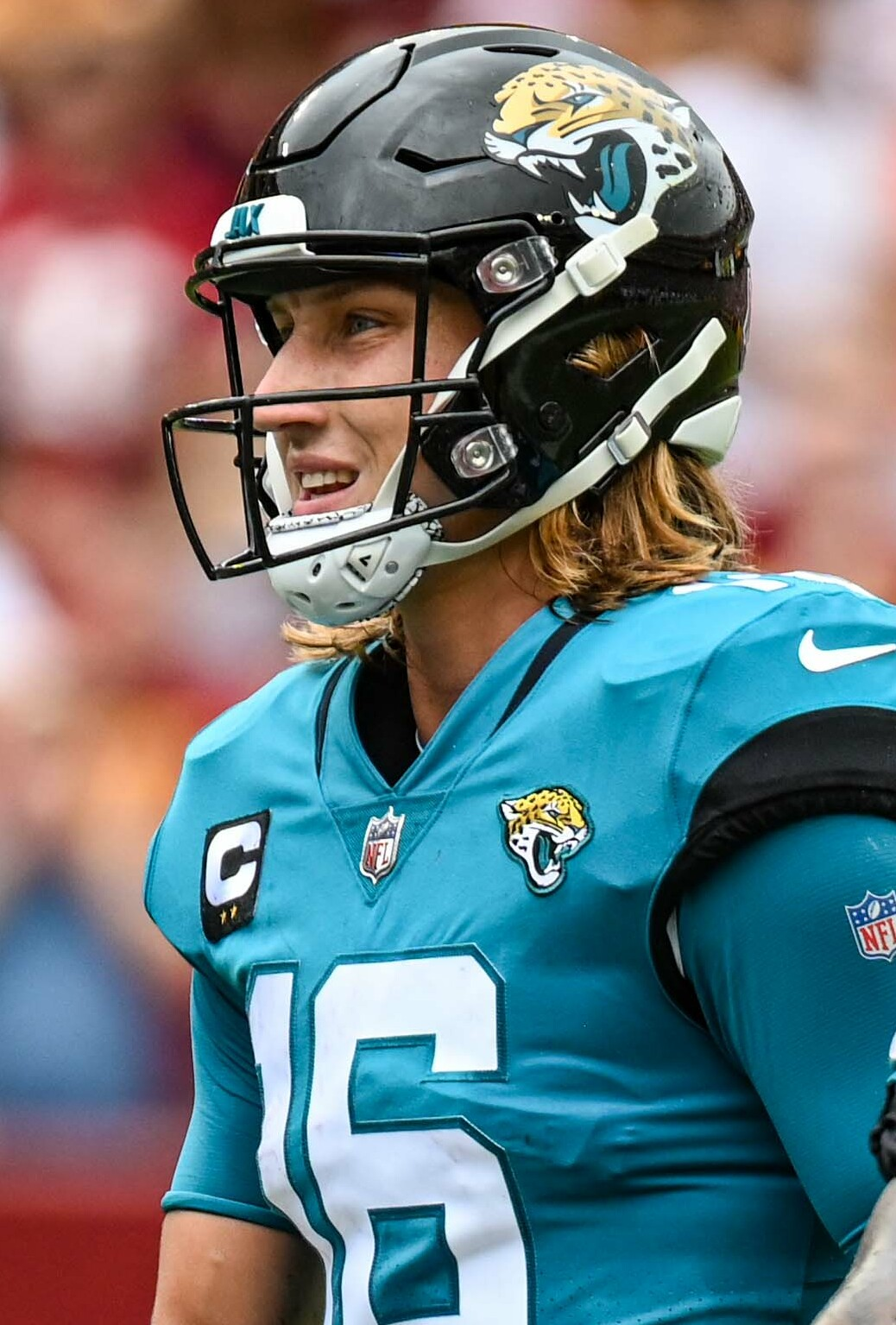
Lawrence in 2022

After losing to the Washington Commanders in the season opener, Lawrence won his next two games against the Colts and Los Angeles Chargers, throwing for a combined 497 yards and five touchdowns. The latter also marked Lawrence's first road victory and earned him AFC Offensive Player of the Week honors. However, the Jaguars went on a five-game losing streak, during which Lawrence completed 57.8% of his passes for 1,068 yards, five touchdowns, and five interceptions. He also had two games without any touchdown passes. The losing streak ended with a Week 9 victory over the Las Vegas Raiders, which saw Lawrence help Jacksonville overcome a 20–10 halftime deficit to win 27–20.

The Week 9 victory kicked off the Jaguars winning seven of their last nine games, with Lawrence throwing for 2,273 yards, 15 touchdowns, and two interceptions. During this period, he led a game-winning drive against the Baltimore Ravens in the final two minutes of their Week 12 matchup and helped overcome a 17-point third quarter deficit in Week 15 to beat the Dallas Cowboys in overtime. Lawrence was also named AFC Offensive Player of the Week in Week 14 after completing 30 of 42 passes for 368 yards and three touchdowns while also rushing for a touchdown during a 36–22 road victory over the Tennessee Titans. During the regular season finale against the Titans to determine the AFC South, he completed 20 of 32 passes for 212 yards and a touchdown to win 20–16 and clinch the Jaguars' first division title since 2017.

Lawrence finished his second professional season with 4,113 passing yards, 25 touchdowns, and eight interceptions to go along with 62 carries for 291 yards and five touchdowns, all noted improvements from his rookie campaign. Lawrence was named as an alternate to the Pro Bowl and was the first Jaguars quarterback to receive Pro Bowl honors since David Garrard in 2009. He was ranked 96th by his fellow players on the NFL Top 100 Players of 2023. During the Wild Card Round against the Chargers, Lawrence threw four interceptions in the first half, three of which were in the first quarter, which contributed to the Chargers taking a 27–0 lead. However, Lawrence rebounded by throwing a touchdown pass before halftime and completing 18 of 23 passes for 211 yards and three touchdowns in the second half to secure a narrow 31–30 victory. The Jaguars' 27-point comeback was the third-largest in NFL history. In the Divisional Round against the eventual Super Bowl champion Kansas City Chiefs, Lawrence completed 24 of 39 passes for 217 yards, a touchdown, and an interception during the 27–20 road loss, marking his first defeat on a Saturday.

=== 2023 ===
During the season-opening 31–21 road victory over the Colts, Lawrence completed 24 of 32 passes for 241 yards, two touchdowns, and an interception. In the next game against the Chiefs, he had 216 passing yards during the 17–9 loss. The following week against the Texans, Lawrence threw for 279 yards with a touchdown and an interception in the 37–17 loss.

During a Week 4 23–7 victory over the Atlanta Falcons at Wembley Stadium, Lawrence completed 23 of 30 passes for 207 yards and a touchdown. In the next game against the Bills at Tottenham Hotspur Stadium, he threw for 315 yards and a touchdown during the 25–20 victory, despite losing two fumbles. Returning to Jacksonville the following week, Lawrence had 181 passing yards, including two touchdowns and an interception in a 37–20 victory over the Colts. However, Lawrence left the game late with a sprained left knee.

During Week 7 against the New Orleans Saints on Thursday Night Football, despite still being hampered by his sprained knee, Lawrence completed 20-of-29 passes for 204 yards and a touchdown in the 31–24 road victory. In the next game against the Pittsburgh Steelers, Lawrence completed 24 of 32 passes for 292 yards, a touchdown, and an interception during the 20–10 road victory.

Following a Week 9 bye, Lawrence threw for 185 yards and two interceptions and lost a fumble during a 34–3 loss to the San Francisco 49ers. He bounced back from his poor performance against the Titans in the next game, completing 24 of 32 attempts for 262 yards and two touchdowns while also rushing for two touchdowns during the 34–14 victory. Lawrence was named AFC Offensive Player of the Week for his performance against the Titans. Two weeks later against the Bengals on Monday Night Football, Lawrence completed 22-of-29 passes for 259 yards and two touchdowns while also rushing for a touchdown before leaving the eventual 34–31 overtime loss in the fourth quarter with an ankle sprain. Despite his injury, Lawrence played in Week 14 to the Cleveland Browns, where he threw for 257 yards, three touchdowns, and three interceptions during the 31–27 road loss.

During Week 15 against the Baltimore Ravens on Sunday Night Football, Lawrence had 264 passing yards and a touchdown in the 23–7 loss. In the next game against the Tampa Bay Buccaneers, he struggled, throwing for 211 yards, a touchdown, and two interceptions before leaving the eventual 30–12 road loss during the third quarter with a shoulder injury. As a result, Lawrence did not play the following week against Carolina Panthers, marking the first missed game in his NFL career. Lawrence returned in the regular-season finale against the Titans, where he threw for 280 yards, two touchdowns, and two interceptions while the Jaguars also turned the ball over on downs thrice during the 28–20 road loss, finishing the season having lost Lawrence's last five starts and missing the playoffs.

Lawrence finished the 2023 season with 4,016 passing yards, 21 touchdowns, and 14 interceptions to go along with 70 carries for 339 yards and four touchdowns in 16 games and starts despite dealing with four separate injuries. He was ranked 94th by his fellow players on the NFL Top 100 Players of 2024.

=== 2024 ===
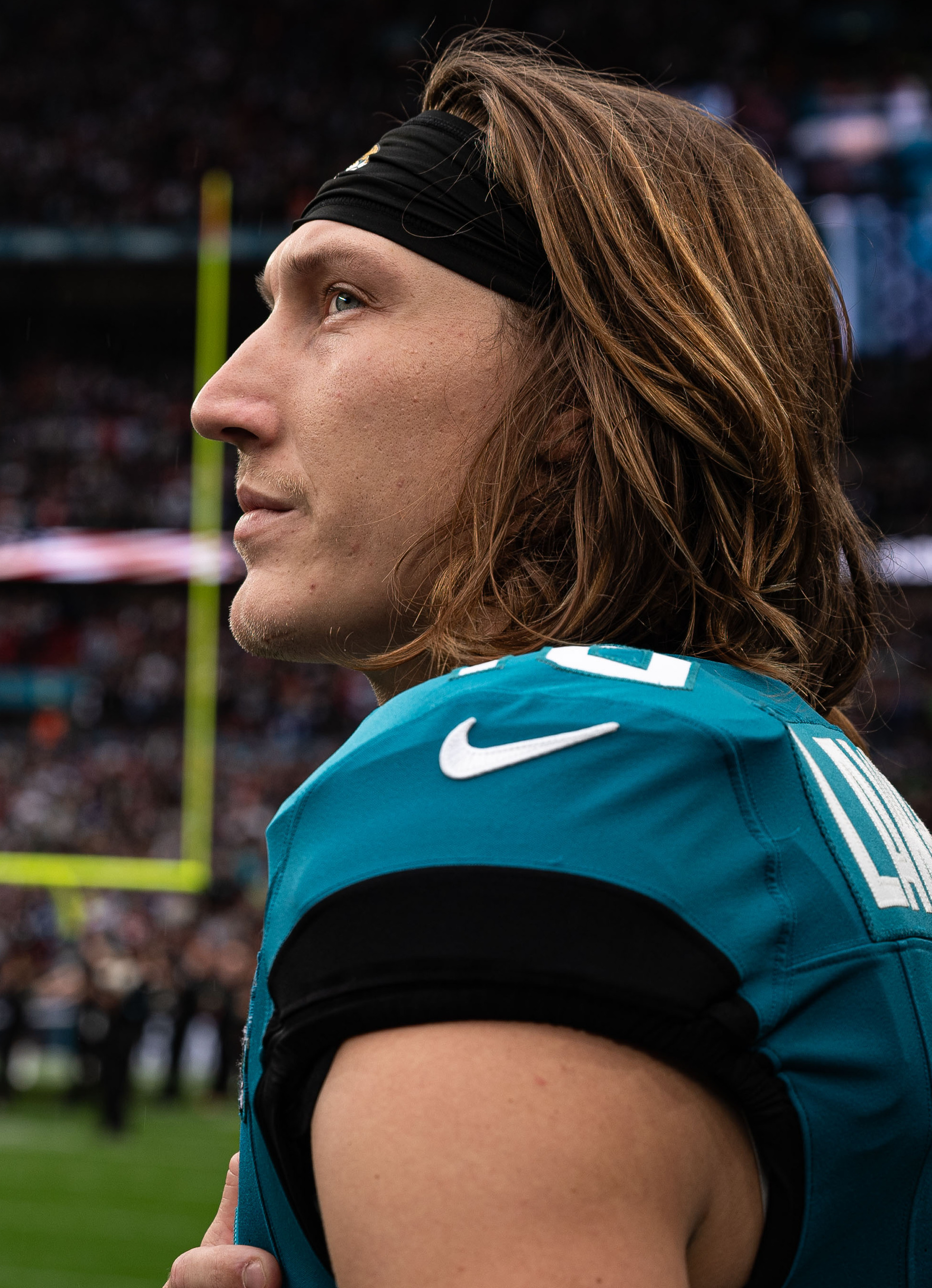
Lawrence in 2024

On April 29, 2024, the Jaguars picked up the fifth-year option on Lawrence's contract. On June 14, he signed a five-year, $275 million contract extension with $142 million guaranteed, which tied him with Joe Burrow as the highest paid player in NFL history at the time of the signing.

After the Jaguars dropped to 0–4 and Lawrence suffered his ninth consecutive loss as a starter, he threw for a career-high 371 yards and two touchdowns in Week 5 against the Colts, leading the team to a 37–34 victory on his 25th birthday. Two weeks later against the New England Patriots in London, Lawrence completed 15 of 20 passes for 193 yards and a touchdown during the 32–16 victory. Returning to Jacksonville the following week against the Green Bay Packers, Lawrence had 308 passing yards, two touchdowns, and an interception to go along with 10 rushing yards and a touchdown in the 30–27 loss.

During a Week 9 28–23 road loss to the Philadelphia Eagles, Lawrence threw for 169 yards and two interceptions while also rushing for two touchdowns. However, he sustained a left shoulder injury that was later identified as a significant AC joint sprain and he was declared inactive for the next two games.

Following a Week 12 bye, Lawrence returned to the lineup on December 1 against the Texans. Texans linebacker Azeez Al-Shaair delivered an illegal hit, a violent blow to Lawrence, as Al-Shaair raised his forearm, dove, and hit the quarterback in his head after Lawrence had slid. Lawrence's body reacted in a manner consistent with one who has received a traumatic brain injury, and he remained motionless on the ground for several minutes. He was carted off the field, and ruled out for the rest of the game with a concussion. The violent hit from Al-Shaair sparked a sideline brawl. Al-Shaair was ejected for "an illegal hit on the quarterback, unnecessary, to the neck and head area." Jaguars coach Doug Pederson said it was a play that "really has no business being in our league," and Houston coach DeMeco Ryans said "that's not what we're coaching." The NFL suspended Al-Shaair without pay for three games, his third penalty of the season. Jon Runyan, the NFL's Vice President of the Policy and Rules, wrote in the suspension letter that his hit on Lawrence was "unacceptable and a serious violation ... You led with your forearm and helmet, and delivered a forceful blow to the head/neck area of [Lawrence] when you had time and space to avoid such contact.... [Your] lack of sportsmanship and respect for the game of football ... puts the health and safety of both you and your opponents in jeopardy and will not be tolerated." On December 4, Lawrence was placed on injured reserve, and he did not play for the rest of the season.

Lawrence finished the 2024 season with 2,045 passing yards, 11 touchdowns, and seven interceptions to go along with 26 carries for 119 yards and three touchdowns in 10 games and starts. The Jaguars finished with a 4–13 record with Lawrence leading them to a record of 2–8 under center, missing the playoffs.

=== 2025 ===
Lawrence began the 2025 season throwing for 178 yards, a touchdown, and an interception in the season-opening 26–10 victory over the Panthers. In the next game against the Bengals, he had 271 passing yards, three touchdowns, and two interceptions during the 31–27 road loss. Two weeks later against the 49ers, Lawrence completed 21 of 31 passes for 174 yards and a touchdown in the 26–21 road victory.

During Week 5, against the Chiefs on his 26th birthday, Lawrence completed 18 of 25 passes for 221 yards, a touchdown, and an interception while also rushing 10 times for 54 yards and two touchdowns in the 31–28 comeback victory on Monday Night Football. The second touchdown run happened after Lawrence was tripped by his own right guard, stumbled getting back up, then breaking a tackle before diving into the endzone for the go ahead score. In the next game against the Seahawks, Lawrence threw for 258 yards and two touchdowns during the 20–12 loss. The following week against the Los Angeles Rams in London, he had 296 passing yards and a touchdown in the 35–7 loss.

Following a Week 8 bye, the Jaguars went on the road to face the Raiders. Despite facing an illness, Lawrence completed 23 of 34 passes for 220 yards and an interception while also rushing for 24 yards and two touchdowns in the narrow 30–29 overtime victory. In the next game against the Texans, he threw for 158 yards, a touchdown, and an interception during the 36–29 road loss. The following week against the Chargers, he had 153 passing yards, a touchdown, and an interception to go along with a rushing touchdown in the 35–6 victory.

During Week 12, Lawrence recorded 256 passing yards, three touchdowns, and three interceptions in a 27–24 overtime road victory over the Cardinals. In the next game against the Titans, he threw for 229 yards and two touchdowns during the 25–3 road victory. The following week against the Colts, Lawrence had 244 passing yards and two touchdowns in the 36–19 victory.

During Week 15, Lawrence had 330 passing yards and five touchdowns to go along with five carries for 51 yards and a touchdown in a 48–20 victory over the New York Jets. He became the first player in NFL history to record five or more passing touchdowns, one or more rushing touchdowns, and 50 or more rushing yards in a single game, and was named AFC Offensive Player of the Week for his performance. He was named AFC Offensive Player of the Month for December.

During the final week of the season against the Titans, Lawrence threw for 255 yards and three touchdowns, to finish the regular season with 29 touchdowns passing and nine rushing. In this game, he broke the franchise record for total touchdowns in a single season with 38, previously held by Blake Bortles. Lawrence was also voted to be the FedEx Air and Ground player of the week for the third time in the 2025 season. He also surpassed 4,000 passing yards for this season, and clinched a division win for the first time since 2022 and the #3-seed in the playoffs. During the Wild Card Round against the Bills, Lawrence threw for 207 yards, three touchdowns, and two interceptions in the 27–24 loss.

== Career statistics ==
Legend
	Led the league
**Bold**	Career high

=== NFL ===
==== Regular season ====
Year	Team	Games			Passing									Rushing					Sacks		Fumbles	
Year	Team	GP	GS	Record	Cmp	Att	Pct	Yds	Y/A	Lng	TD	Int	Rtg	Att	Yds	Avg	Lng	TD	Sck	Yds	Fum	Lost
2021	JAX	17	17	3–14	359	**602**	59.6	3,641	6.0	58	12	**17**	71.9	73	334	4.6	26	2	32	238	9	5
2022	JAX	17	17	9–8	**387**	584	**66.3**	**4,113**	7.0	59	25	8	95.2	62	291	4.7	24	5	27	184	**12**	**9**
2023	JAX	16	16	8–8	370	564	65.6	4,016	7.1	65	21	14	88.5	70	339	**4.8**	26	4	35	224	**12**	7
2024	JAX	10	10	2–8	172	284	60.6	2,045	7.2	**85**	11	7	85.2	26	119	4.6	**33**	3	18	140	3	1
2025	JAX	17	17	**13–4**	341	560	60.9	4,007	7.2	63	**29**	12	91.0	**82**	**359**	4.4	21	**9**	**41**	**247**	5	2
2026	JAX	9	9	7–2	171	259	66.0	2,284	**8.8**	52	21	5	112.6	25	106	4.2	16	0	14	122	3	1
Career		86	86	42–44	1,810	2,853	63.4	20,106	7.0	85	119	63	89.2	338	1,548	4.6	33	23	167	1,155	44	24

==== Postseason ====
	Team	Games			Passing									Rushing					Sacks		Fumbles	
	Team	GP	GS	Record	Cmp	Att	Pct	Yds	Y/A	Lng	TD	Int	Rtg	Att	Yds	Avg	Lng	TD	Sck	Yds	Fum	Lost
2022	JAX	2	2	**1–1**	**52**	**86**	**60.5**	**505**	5.9	**39**	**5**	**5**	72.1	4	**34**	**8.5**	12	0	**4**	**27**	0	0
2025	JAX	1	1	0–1	18	30	60.0	207	**6.9**	34	3	2	**86.4**	**6**	31	5.2	**18**	0	1	2	0	0
Career		3	3	1–2	70	116	60.3	712	6.1	39	8	7	75.8	10	65	6.5	18	0	5	29	0	0

=== College ===
Legend
Won the CFP National Championship

Season	Team	Games			Passing							Rushing			
Season	Team	GP	GS	Record	Cmp	Att	Pct	Yds	TD	Int	Rtg	Att	Yds	Avg	TD
2018	Clemson	15	11	11–0	259	397	65.2	3,280	30	4	157.6	60	177	3.0	1
2019	Clemson	15	15	**14–1**	**268**	**407**	65.8	**3,665**	**36**	**8**	166.7	**103**	**563**	**5.5**	**9**
2020	Clemson	10	10	9–1	231	334	**69.2**	3,153	24	5	**169.2**	68	203	3.0	8
Career		40	36	34–2	758	1,138	66.6	10,098	90	17	164.3	231	943	4.1	18

== Career highlights ==
NFL

- Pro Bowl (2022)

College

- CFP national champion (2018)
- CFP National Championship Game Offensive MVP (2019)
- Archie Griffin Award (2018)
- ACC Athlete of the Year (2021)
- ACC Player of the Year (2020)
- ACC Offensive Player of the Year (2020)
- ACC Offensive Rookie of the Year (2018)
- First-team All-American (2020)
- 2× First-team All-ACC (2019, 2020)
- Second-team All-ACC (2018)

== Personal life ==
Lawrence is Baptist. He is noted for his long blond hair. Lawrence's older brother, Chase, is a visual artist for whom Trevor has posed. On April 10, 2021, Lawrence married Marissa Mowry, whom he had been dating since high school. In June 2024, they announced they were expecting their first child. Their daughter, Shae Lynn, was born on January 4, 2025.

In 2021, Lawrence, among other high-profile athletes and celebrities, was a paid spokesperson for FTX, a cryptocurrency exchange. In November 2022, FTX filed for bankruptcy, wiping out billions of dollars in customer funds. Lawrence, alongside other spokespeople, was sued for promoting unregistered securities through a class-action lawsuit, which was settled in September 2023.

American Eagle featured Lawrence in its "Live Your Life" marketing campaign in 2024.
