= Tyson Campbell =

American football player (born 2000)

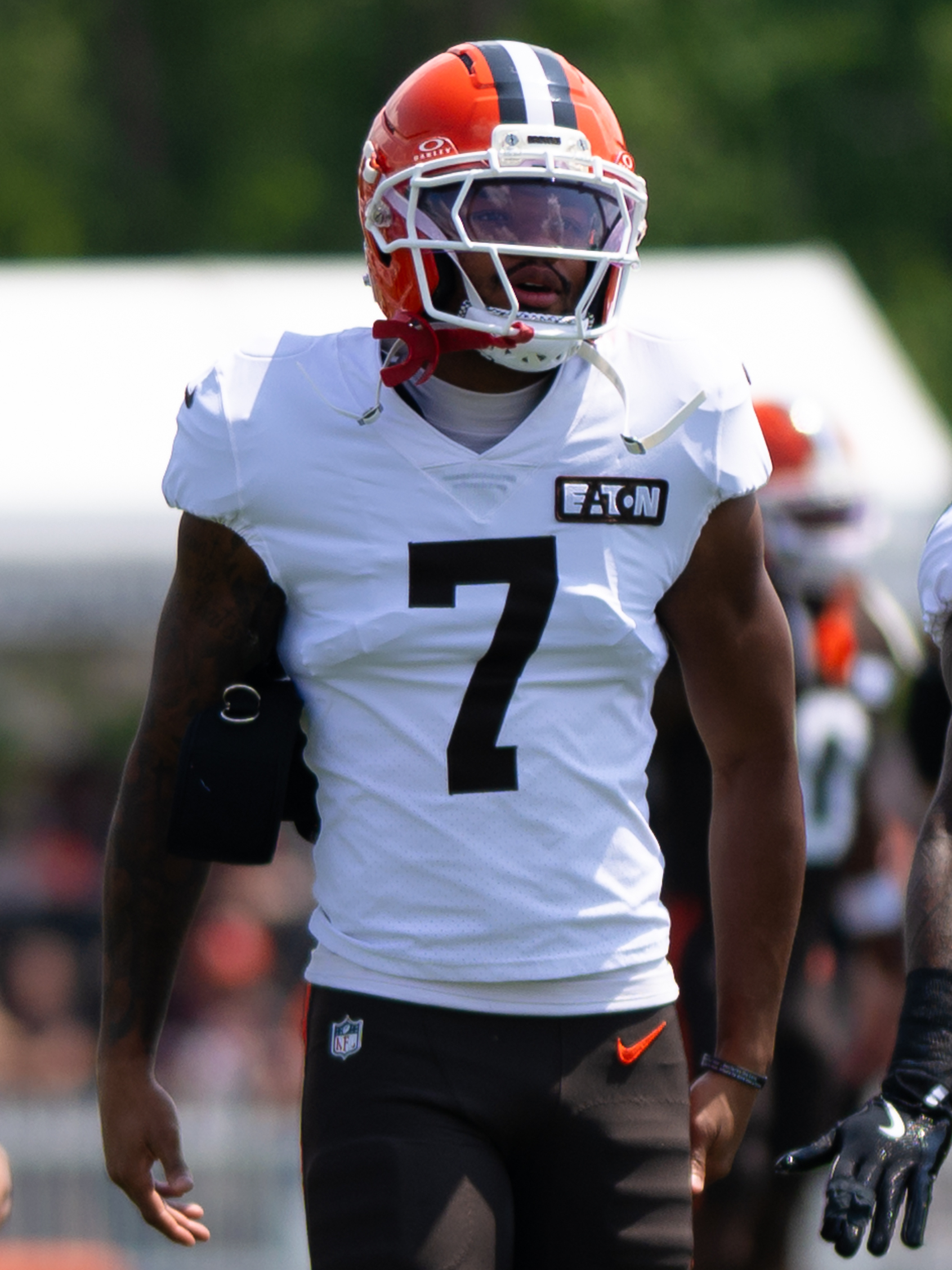
- Campbell with the Cleveland Browns in 2026

No. 7 – Cleveland Browns
- Position: Cornerback
- Roster status: Active

Personal information
- Born: March 17, 2000 (age 26); Plantation, Florida, U.S.
- Listed height: 6 ft 1 in (1.85 m)
- Listed weight: 195 lb (88 kg)

Career information
- High school: American Heritage (Plantation)
- College: Georgia (2018–2020)
- NFL draft: 2021: 2nd round, 33rd overall pick

Career history
- Jacksonville Jaguars (2021–2025); Cleveland Browns (2025–present)

Career NFL statistics as of Week 5, 2026
- Total tackles: 373
- Forced fumbles: 4
- Fumble recoveries: 2
- Pass deflections: 55
- Interceptions: 7
- Defensive touchdowns: 2
- Stats at Pro Football Reference

Tyson Malik Campbell (born March 17, 2000) is an American professional football cornerback for the Cleveland Browns of the National Football League (NFL). He played college football for the Georgia Bulldogs. He was selected by the Jacksonville Jaguars in the second round of the 2021 NFL draft.

== Early life ==
Campbell attended American Heritage School in Plantation, Florida. A five star recruit, he was ranked as the second-best cornerback recruit in the nation behind teammate Patrick Surtain II. He played in the 2018 U.S. Army All-American Bowl. Campbell committed to the University of Georgia to play college football.

== College career ==
As a true freshman at Georgia in 2018, Campbell started 11 of 14 games, recording 45 tackles and a fumble recovery for a touchdown. As a sophomore he started three of nine games, missing five due to injury. He finished the year with 15 tackles, one sack, and a fumble recovery touchdown.

== Professional career ==
=== Pre-draft ===
On January 6, 2021, Campbell announced his decision to forgo his senior year and declared for the 2021 NFL draft. The consensus among NFL draft analysts projected him to be selected in the second or third round. He was ranked as the seventh best cornerback in the draft by a draft analyst from Sports Illustrated and Daniel Jeremiah from NFL.com. Sports Illustrated senior scout Lorenz Leinweber ranked him ninth among all cornerbacks. Dan Brugler from the New York Times ranked Campbell as the eighth cornerback in 2021.

External videos
- 2021 Draft Prospects: Tyson Campbell

Pre-draft measurables
Height	Weight	Arm length	Hand span	Wingspan	40-yard dash	10-yard split	20-yard split	20-yard shuttle	Three-cone drill	Vertical jump	Broad jump	Bench press
6 ft 1 in (1.85 m)	193 lb (88 kg)	32 in (0.81 m)	9 in (0.23 m)	6 ft 3 1/2 in (1.92 m)	4.36 s	1.53 s	2.51 s	4.45 s	7.15 s	34.5 in (0.88 m)	10 ft 4 in (3.15 m)	12 reps
All values from Pro Day

=== Jacksonville Jaguars ===
==== 2021 ====
The Jacksonville Jaguars selected Campbell in the second round (33rd overall) of the 2021 NFL draft. He was the sixth cornerback drafted in 2021.

External videos
- Jaguars select Tyson Campbell No. 33
- Inside the draft room: Tyson Campbell

""I wouldn't say 'insurance policy'. It's an 'insurance policy,' the fact that guys get dinged up at that position. Last year was a tough year for us. We had a lot of injuries back there. But it's also—the thing Tyson Campbell gives us is flexibility, something other than (cornerback). He was a safety in high school and he's a very physical player, great blitzer. Those are all the qualities of a nickel. So to have a guy—they're very hard to find. I go back to Florida days of Will Hill or Ahmad Black. But they're hard to find, the guys that can go inside and outside. And that's the reason why. When we saw him sitting there, I didn't know he'd make it there. We were worried he'd be gone before that."

— Urban Meyer (Jaguars' head coach)

On July 20, 2021, the Jacksonville Jaguars signed Campbell to a four-year, $9.01 million contract that includes $5.98 million guaranteed and a signing bonus of $3.91 million.

Throughout training camp, Campbell competed against Chris Claybrooks, Tre Herndon, Nevin Lawson, and Sidney Jones to earn the third spot at cornerback on the depth chart and a role as the starting nickelback. Head coach Urban Meyer listed Campbell as the third cornerback on the depth chart behind starting cornerback duo C. J. Henderson and Shaquill Griffin.

On September 12, 2021, Campbell made his professional regular season debut and recorded two solo tackles in a 21–37 loss at the Houston Texans. On September 19, 2021, Campbell earned his first career start as a slot cornerback and made three combined tackles (two solo) and a pass deflection in 13–23 loss to the Denver Broncos. On September 21, 2021, the Jaguars traded C. J. Henderson to the Carolina Panthers. Defensive coordinator Joe Cullen subsequently elevated Campbell to starting cornerback, alongside Shaquill Griffin. In Week 4, he collected a season–high nine combined tackles (four solo) as the Jaguars lost 21–24 at the Cincinnati Bengals. He was sidelined for two games (Weeks 5–6) due to a toe injury. On November 28, 2021, Campbell made three combined tackles (two solo), a season-high three pass deflections, and had his first career interception off a pass by Matt Ryan intended for tight end Kyle Pitts in the Jaguars' 14–21 loss to the Atlanta Falcons. On December 16, 2021 the Jacksonville Jaguars fired head coach Urban Meyer with offensive coordinator Darrell Bevell named the interim head coach. Campbell completed his rookie season in 2021 with a total of 73 combined tackles (49 solo), ten pass deflections, and two interceptions in 15 games and 14 starts. He received an overall grade of 62.7 from Pro Football Focus as a rookie in 2021.

==== 2022 ====
On February 3, 2022, the Jacksonville Jaguars hired Doug Pederson as their head coach. Defensive coordinator Mike Caldwell chose to have Campbell and Shaquill Griffin remain as the starting cornerbacks along with Darious Williams starting at nickelback.

On September 12, 2022, Campbell started in the Jaguars' season-opener and recorded three combined tackles (two solo), deflected a pass, and made his first interception of the season on a pass by Carson Wentz to Jahan Dotson during the fourth quarter of a 20–28 loss at the Washington Commanders. In Week 6, Campbell collected a season-high 7 solo tackles, a season-high three pass deflections, and a forced fumble in a 34–27 loss at the Indianapolis Colts. On January 1, 2023, Campbell had three combined tackles (two solo) and scored the first touchdown of his career when teammate Josh Hines-Allen sacked and forced a fumble by Davis Mills that Campbell subsequently recovered and returned it for a 12-yard touchdown in a 31–3 victory over the Houston Texans. In Week 18, he made five combined tackles (three solo), a pass deflection, and set a career-high of three interceptions in a single season when he intercepted a pass from Joshua Dobbs to Treylon Burks in a 20–16 victory over the Tennessee Titans. He started all 17 games during the 2022 NFL season and finished with 70 combined tackles (52 solo), three interceptions, 15 passes defensed, one forced fumble, and two fumble recoveries. He received an overall grade of 82.1 from Pro Football Focus, which was the fifth highest grade among all qualifying cornerbacks in 2022. He also received a defensive grade of 80.8 from PFF, which ranked seventh amongst all cornerbacks.

==== 2023 ====
Campbell was expected to take over as the top cornerback after Shaquill Griffin departed during free agency. Head coach Doug Pederson named Campbell a starting cornerback to kick off the season, alongside Darious Williams and Tre Herndon.

In Week 1, Campbell recorded six solo tackles, deflected a pass, and made his first and only interception of the season from a pass thrown by Indianapolis Colts quarterback Anthony Richardson in a 31–21 win at the Indianapolis Colts. He missed two games (Weeks 7–8) due to a hamstring injury. After reaggravating the hamstring injury, he was sidelined for two more games (Weeks 11–12). Campbell sustained a quadriceps injury and was inactive for another two games (Weeks 14–15). On December 31, 2023, Campbell recorded a season-high eight combined tackles (seven solo) and made one pass deflection in a 26–0 win over the Carolina Panthers. He finished the 2023 NFL season with a total of 60 combined tackles (41 solo), five pass deflections, and one interception in 11 games and 11 starts. Pro Football Focus had Campbell complete the season with an overall grade of 61.5 in 2023.

==== 2024 ====
On January 8, 2024, head coach Doug Pederson fired defensive coordinator Mike Caldwell and the entire coaching staff. On January 22, 2024, the Jacksonville Jaguars hired former Atlanta Falcons' defensive coordinator Ryan Nielsen as their new defensive coordinator.

On July 23, 2024, the Jaguars signed Campbell to a four-year, $76.50 million contract that includes $53.40 million guaranteed $31.50 million guaranteed upon signing and a signing bonus of $16.00 million. Head coach Doug Pederson named Campbell and Ronald Darby the starting cornerback tandem to begin the regular season.

On September 12, 2024, the Jacksonville Jaguars officially placed Campbell on injured reserve after he injured his hamstring in Week 1 against the Miami Dolphins. He would be sidelined for five consecutive games (Weeks 2–6). He was activated on October 19. In Week 9, he collected a season-high nine combined tackles (four solo) and made one pass deflection during a 23–28 loss at the Philadelphia Eagles. He finished the 2024 NFL season with a total of 59 combined tackles (42 solo) and six pass deflections in 12 games and 12 starts. He received an overall grade of 62.9 from Pro Football Focus in 2024, which ranked 103rd among 222 qualifying cornerbacks.

=== Cleveland Browns ===
On October 9, 2025, Campbell was traded, along with a 2026 seventh round pick, to the Cleveland Browns in exchange for Greg Newsome II and a 2026 sixth round pick.

== NFL career statistics ==
Legend
**Bold**	Career high

=== Regular season ===
Year	Team	Games		Tackles					Interceptions						Fumbles			
Year	Team	GP	GS	Comb	Sol	Ast	Sck	TFL	Int	Yds	Avg	Lng	TD	PD	FF	FR	Yds	TD
2021	JAX	15	14	73	49	24	0.0	**2**	2	3	1.5	3	0	10	0	0	0	0
2022	JAX	**17**	**17**	70	**55**	15	0.0	**2**	**3**	32	10.7	29	0	15	1	**2**	**12**	**1**
2023	JAX	11	11	60	41	19	0.0	**2**	1	0	0	0	0	5	1	0	0	0
2024	JAX	12	12	59	42	17	0.0	**2**	0	0	0	0	0	6	0	0	0	0
2025	JAX	**5**	**5**	**34**	22	**12**	0.0	**1**	0	0	0	0	0	**6**	**1**	0	0	0
2025	CLE	**12**	**12**	**53**	32	**21**	0.0	**1**	1	**34**	**34.0**	**34**	**1**	**12**	**1**	0	0	0
2026	CLE	4	4	24	25	9	0.0	1	0	0	0.0	0	0	1	0	0	0	0
Career		76	75	373	256	117	0.0	11	7	69	9.9	34	1	55	4	2	12	1

=== Postseason ===
Year	Team	Games		Tackles					Interceptions						Fumbles			
Year	Team	GP	GS	Comb	Sol	Ast	Sck	TFL	Int	Yds	Avg	Lng	TD	PD	FF	FR	Yds	TD
2022	JAX	2	2	6	5	1	0.0	0	0	0	0	0	0	0	0	0	0	0
Career		2	2	6	5	1	0.0	0	0	0	0	0	0	0	0	0	0	0
