= 2022 Jacksonville Jaguars season =

28th season in franchise history

- Owner: Shahid Khan
- General manager: Trent Baalke
- Head coach: Doug Pederson
- Offensive coordinator: Press Taylor
- Defensive coordinator: Mike Caldwell
- Home stadium: TIAA Bank Field

Results
- Record: 9–8
- Division place: 1st AFC South
- Playoffs: Won Wild Card Playoffs (vs. Chargers) 31–30; Lost Divisional Playoffs (at Chiefs) 20–27
- Pro Bowlers: RS Jamal Agnew; QB Trevor Lawrence

Uniform
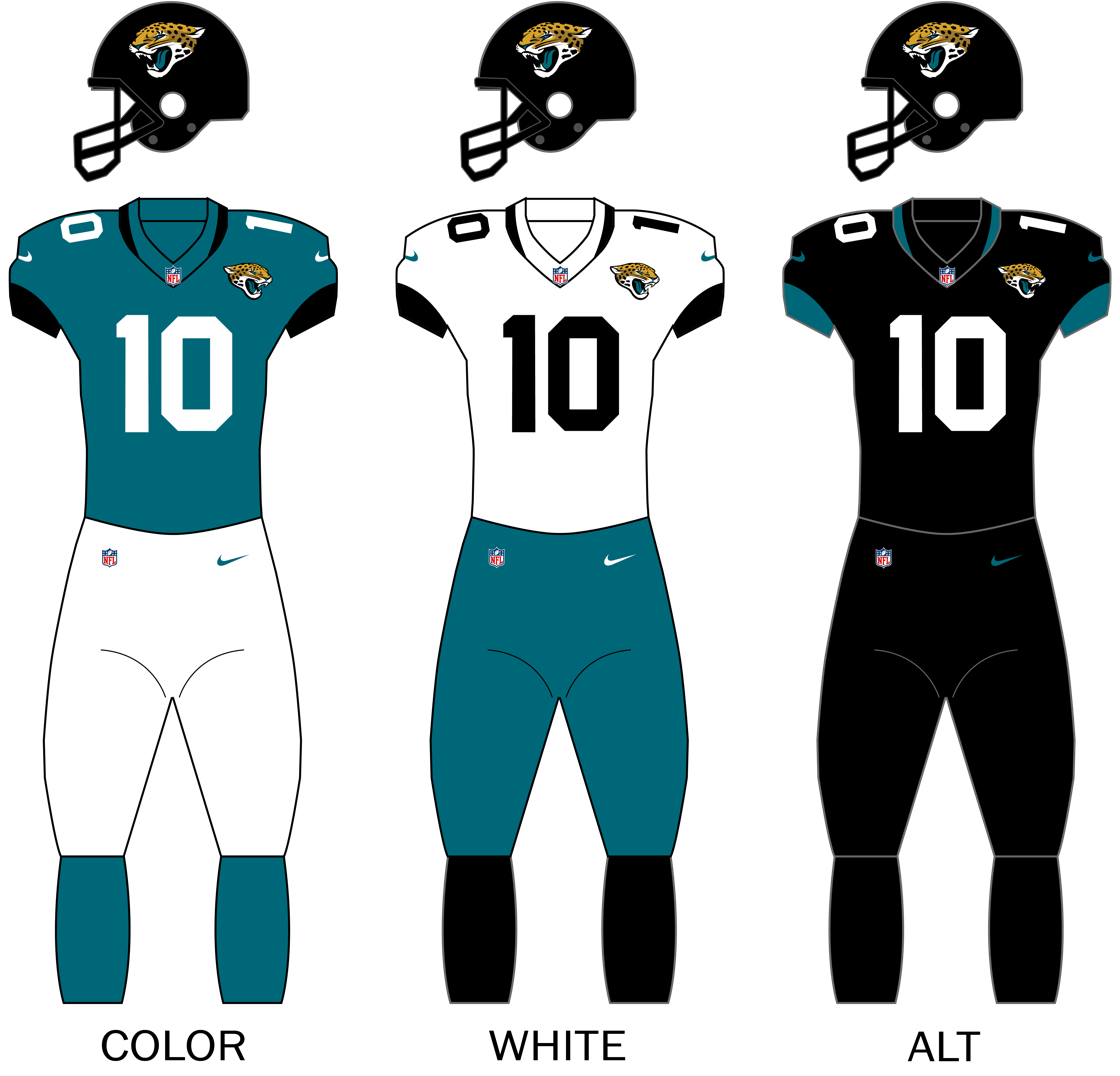

The 2022 season was the Jacksonville Jaguars' 28th season in the National Football League (NFL) and their first under head coach Doug Pederson.

Following a 3–14 season marked with on-and off-the-field issues by head coach Urban Meyer who ultimately got fired, the Jaguars were one of the most active teams in free agency during the offseason and spent a record $175.3 million in guaranteed money, with the notable additions of Christian Kirk, Zay Jones, Brandon Scherff, Evan Engram, Foyesade Oluokun, Darious Williams and Folorunso Fatukasi. They earned the first overall pick for the second straight year in the 2022 NFL draft, which they used to select defensive end Travon Walker from Georgia.

Despite a 3–7 start, the Jaguars won six of their final seven games, tripling their win total from 2021, including finishing the season on a five-game winning streak to win their fourth division title and second AFC South title after a Week 18 win over the Tennessee Titans, securing their first playoff berth since 2017. They also became the second team in NFL history after the 2008 San Diego Chargers to start 4–8 and make the playoffs.

In the Wild Card round, the Jaguars rallied from a 27–0 deficit to defeat the Los Angeles Chargers 31–30. It was the largest comeback in franchise history and the third largest in NFL postseason history. However, their season would end the following week with a 27–20 loss to the eventual Super Bowl LVII champion Kansas City Chiefs in the Divisional round.

== Offseason ==
=== NFL draft ===
2022 Jacksonville Jaguars draft
Round	Pick	Player	Position	College	Notes
1	1	Travon Walker	DE	Georgia	
1	27	Devin Lloyd	LB	Utah	From Buccaneers (Note: The Jaguars traded second-, fourth- and sixth-round selections (33rd, 106th, and 180th overall) to the Tampa Bay Buccaneers in exchange for a first-round selection (27th overall).)
2	33	Traded to the Tampa Bay Buccaneers			
3	65	Luke Fortner	C	Kentucky	
3	70	Chad Muma	LB	Wyoming	From Panthers (Note: The Jaguars traded CB C. J. Henderson and a fifth-round selection (144th overall) to the Carolina Panthers in exchange for TE Dan Arnold and a third-round selection (70th overall).)
4	106	Traded to the Tampa Bay Buccaneers			
5	144	Traded to the Carolina Panthers			
5	154	Snoop Conner	RB	Ole Miss	From Commanders via Eagles (Note: The Jaguars traded two sixth-round selections (188th and 198th overall) to the Philadelphia Eagles in exchange for a fifth-round selection (154th overall).)
5	157	Traded to the Tampa Bay Buccaneers (Note: The Jaguars traded fifth- and seventh-round selections (157th and 235th overall) to the Tampa Bay Buccaneers in exchange for a 2023 fourth-round selection.)			From Vikings (Note: The Jaguars traded DE Yannick Ngakoue to the Minnesota Vikings in exchange for a conditional fifth-round selection (157th overall) and a 2021 second-round selection. The fifth-round pick would have become a fourth-round pick if Ngakoue was selected on the first ballot to the 2021 Pro Bowl (not as an alternate). This did not happen, so the pick remained in the fifth round. Fans of several other teams unsuccessfully attempted to vote Ngakoue into the Pro Bowl and cause the Vikings to give up the higher pick.)
6	180	Traded to the Tampa Bay Buccaneers			
6	188	Traded to the Philadelphia Eagles			From Seahawks (Note: The Jaguars traded CB Sidney Jones to the Seattle Seahawks in exchange for a sixth-round selection (188th overall).)
6	197	Gregory Junior	CB	Ouachita Baptist	From Eagles (Note: The Jaguars traded QB Gardner Minshew to the Philadelphia Eagles in exchange for a conditional sixth-round selection (197th overall).)
6	198	Traded to the Philadelphia Eagles			From Steelers (Note: The Jaguars traded LB Joe Schobert to the Pittsburgh Steelers in exchange for a sixth-round selection 198th overall).)
7	222	Montaric Brown	CB	Arkansas	
7	235	Traded to the Tampa Bay Buccaneers			From Ravens (Note: The Jaguars traded TE Josh Oliver to the Baltimore Ravens in exchange for a conditional seventh-round selection (235th overall). The trade was conditional on Oliver making Baltimore's roster in 2021.)

Draft trades

=== Undrafted free agents ===
Name	Position	College	Ref.
Israel Antwine	DT	Oklahoma State	
Kevin Austin Jr.	WR	Notre Dame	
Naz Bohannon	TE	Clemson	
Shabari Davids	CB	Southeast Missouri State	
De'Shaan Dixon	OLB	Norfolk State	
Nick Ford	C, G	Utah	
Benjie Franklin	CB	Tarleton State	
Grayson Gunter	TE	Southern Miss	
Willie Johnson	WR	Marshall	
Sean Mahone	S	West Virginia	
Ryan McDaniel	WR	North Carolina Central	
Andrew Mevis	K	Iowa State	
Grant Morgan	LB	Arkansas	
Denzel Okafor	G	Texas	
E. J. Perry	QB	Brown	
Gerrit Prince	TE	UAB	
Marcus Tatum	OT	UCF	
Josh Thompson	CB	Texas	
Lujuan Winningham	WR	Central Arkansas	

== Staff ==
=== Offseason changes ===
==== Head coach ====
The Jacksonville Jaguars fired first-year head coach Urban Meyer on December 16, 2021, due to on-and off-the-field issues along with a 2–11 record.

=== Staff ===
2022 Jacksonville Jaguars staff
Front office: Owner – Shahid Khan; President – Mark Lamping; General manager – Trent Baalke; Assistant general manager – Ethan Waugh; Director of college scouting – Michael Davis; Director of pro scouting – Regis Eller; Director of pro personnel – DeJuan Polk; Player personnel coordinator – Drew Hughes; Director of player assessment – Ryan Stamper; Director of roster management – Trip MacCracken; National scout – Tom McConnaughey; National scout – John Stevenson; Chief football strategy officer – Tony Khan; Head coaches: Head coach – Doug Pederson; Offensive coaches: Offensive coordinator – Press Taylor; Passing game coordinator – Jim Bob Cooter; Quarterbacks – Mike McCoy; Assistant quarterbacks – Andrew Breiner; Running backs – Bernie Parmalee; Assistant running backs – Tyler Tettleton; Wide receivers – Chris Jackson; Tight ends – Richard Angulo; Offensive line – Phil Rauscher; Assistant offensive line – Todd Washington; Offensive quality control – Henry Burris; Offensive quality control – Nick Williams	Defensive coaches: Defensive coordinator – Mike Caldwell; Defensive line – Brentson Buckner; Assistant defensive line – Rory Segrest; Outside linebackers – Bill Shuey; Inside linebackers – Tony Gilbert; Passing game coordinator/cornerbacks – Deshea Townsend; Safeties – Cody Grimm; Senior defensive assistant – Bob Sutton; Defensive quality control – Patrick Reilly; Defensive quality control – Sean Cullina; Special teams coaches: Special teams coordinator – Heath Farwell; Assistant special teams coordinator – Luke Thompson; Strength and conditioning: Head strength and conditioning coach – Cedric Scott; Assistant strength and conditioning coach – Adam Potts; Assistant strength and conditioning coach – Brandon Ireland; Assistant strength and conditioning coach – Kevin Maxen

== Final roster ==
2022 Jacksonville Jaguars roster
Quarterbacks (QB): 3 C. J. Beathard; 16 Trevor Lawrence; Running backs (RB): 24 Snoop Conner; 1 Travis Etienne; 22 JaMycal Hasty; Wide receivers (WR): 39 Jamal Agnew; 11 Marvin Jones; 15 Tim Jones; 7 Zay Jones; 13 Christian Kirk; 14 Kendric Pryor; Tight ends (TE): 85 Dan Arnold; 17 Evan Engram; 89 Luke Farrell; 84 Chris Manhertz	Offensive linemen (OL): 79 Luke Fortner C; 73 Blake Hance G/T; 72 Walker Little T; 68 Brandon Scherff G; 69 Tyler Shatley G; 75 Jawaan Taylor T; 70 Cole Van Lanen G/T; Defensive linemen (DL): 94 Folorunso Fatukasi DE; 96 Adam Gotsis DE; 52 DaVon Hamilton NT; 98 Jeremiah Ledbetter DE; 98 Corey Peters DE/NT; 95 Roy Robertson-Harris DE	Linebackers (LB): 41 Josh Allen OLB; 45 K'Lavon Chaisson OLB; 47 De'Shaan Dixon OLB; 57 Caleb Johnson ILB; 49 Arden Key OLB; 33 Devin Lloyd ILB; 48 Chad Muma ILB; 23 Foyesade Oluokun ILB; 50 Shaq Quarterman ILB; 44 Travon Walker OLB; Defensive backs (DB): 30 Montaric Brown CB; 29 Tevaughn Campbell CB; 32 Tyson Campbell CB; 38 Andre Cisco FS; 6 Chris Claybrooks CB; 37 Tre Herndon CB; 2 Rayshawn Jenkins SS; 34 Gregory Junior CB; 20 Daniel Thomas SS; 42 Andrew Wingard FS; 31 Darious Williams CB; Special teams (ST): 9 Logan Cooke P; 46 Ross Matiscik LS; 10 Riley Patterson K	Practice squad: 80 Kevin Austin Jr. WR; 54 Taco Charlton OLB; 64 Coy Cronk T; 27 Tyree Gillespie SS; 12 James McCourt K; 83 Jaylon Moore WR; 61 Jimmy Murray C; 35 Ayo Oyelola SS (IPP); 4 E. J. Perry QB; 86 Gerrit Prince TE; 58 Garrison Sanborn LS; 36 Mekhi Sargent RB; 21 Deionte Thompson FS; 97 Nick Thurman DE; 60 Darryl Williams C; 81 Seth Williams WR; Reserve: 78 Ben Bartch G (IR); 26 Shaquill Griffin CB (IR); -- Willie Johnson WR (IR); 18 Calvin Ridley WR (Susp.); 74 Cam Robinson T (IR); 92 Jordan Smith OLB (IR); 91 Dawuane Smoot OLB (IR); Rookies in italics 52 active, 7 reserve, 15 practice squad (1 exempt)

== Preseason ==
On February 28, the NFL announced that the Jaguars would play the Las Vegas Raiders in the Pro Football Hall of Fame Game on Thursday, August 4, at Tom Benson Hall of Fame Stadium in Canton, Ohio, at 8:00 p.m. EDT. The Jaguars would be represented by offensive tackle Tony Boselli, who played with the team during the franchise's first seven seasons from 1995–2001. The two teams would meet again during the regular season in Jacksonville.

Week	Date	Opponent	Result	Record	Venue	Recap
HOF	August 4	vs. Las Vegas Raiders	L 11–27	0–1	Tom Benson Hall of Fame Stadium (Canton)	Recap
1	August 12	Cleveland Browns	L 13–24	0–2	TIAA Bank Field	Recap
2	August 20	Pittsburgh Steelers	L 15–16	0–3	TIAA Bank Field	Recap
3	August 27	at Atlanta Falcons	L 12–28	0–4	Mercedes Benz Stadium	Recap

== Regular season ==
=== Schedule ===
Week	Date	Opponent	Result	Record	Venue	Recap
1	September 11	at Washington Commanders	**L** 22–28	0–1	FedExField	Recap
2	September 18	**Indianapolis Colts**	**W** 24–0	1–1	TIAA Bank Field	Recap
3	September 25	at Los Angeles Chargers	**W** 38–10	2–1	SoFi Stadium	Recap
4	October 2	at Philadelphia Eagles	**L** 21–29	2–2	Lincoln Financial Field	Recap
5	October 9	**Houston Texans**	**L** 6–13	2–3	TIAA Bank Field	Recap
6	October 16	at **Indianapolis Colts**	**L** 27–34	2–4	Lucas Oil Stadium	Recap
7	October 23	New York Giants	**L** 17–23	2–5	TIAA Bank Field	Recap
8	October 30	Denver Broncos	**L** 17–21	2–6	(United Kingdom) Wembley Stadium (London)	Recap
9	November 6	Las Vegas Raiders	**W** 27–20	3–6	TIAA Bank Field	Recap
10	November 13	at Kansas City Chiefs	**L** 17–27	3–7	Arrowhead Stadium	Recap
11	Bye					
12	November 27	Baltimore Ravens	**W** 28–27	4–7	TIAA Bank Field	Recap
13	December 4	at Detroit Lions	**L** 14–40	4–8	Ford Field	Recap
14	December 11	at **Tennessee Titans**	**W** 36–22	5–8	Nissan Stadium	Recap
15	December 18	Dallas Cowboys	**W** 40–34 (OT)	6–8	TIAA Bank Field	Recap
16	December 22	at New York Jets	**W** 19–3	7–8	MetLife Stadium	Recap
17	January 1	at **Houston Texans**	**W** 31–3	8–8	NRG Stadium	Recap
18	January 7	**Tennessee Titans**	**W** 20–16	9–8	TIAA Bank Field	Recap

Note: Intra-division opponents are in bold text.

=== Game summaries ===
==== Week 1: at Washington Commanders ====
Week One: Jacksonville Jaguars at Washington Commanders – Game summary

Quarter	1	2	3	4	Total
Jaguars	3	0	9	10	**22**
**Commanders**	7	7	0	14	**28**

at FedExField, Landover, Maryland

- Date: September 11
- Game time: 1:00 p.m. EDT
- Game weather: Cloudy, 74 °F (23 °C)
- Game attendance: 58,192
- Referee: Tra Blake
- TV announcers (Fox): Chris Myers, Robert Smith and Jen Hale
- Recap, Game Book

Game information

**First quarter**

- JAX – Riley Patterson 33-yard field goal, 11:57. Jaguars 3–0. **Drive: 7 plays, 60 yards, 3:03.**
- WAS – Curtis Samuel 3-yard pass from Carson Wentz (Joey Slye kick), 7:36. Commanders 7–3. **Drive: 8 plays, 74 yards, 4:21.**

**Second quarter**

- WAS – Jahan Dotson 7-yard pass from Carson Wentz (Joey Slye kick), 11:47. Commanders 14–3. **Drive: 14 plays, 71 yards, 7:31.**

**Third quarter**

- JAX – James Robinson 3-yard pass from Trevor Lawrence (pass failed), 8:50. Commanders 14–9. **Drive: 6 plays, 80 yards, 3:08.**
- JAX – Riley Patterson 43-yard field goal, 1:16. Commanders 14–12. **Drive: 11 plays, 55 yards, 5:29.**

**Fourth quarter**

- JAX – Riley Patterson 45-yard field goal, 12:04. Jaguars 15–14. **Drive: 6 plays, 19 yards, 2:15.**
- JAX – James Robinson 11-yard run (Riley Patterson kick), 11:45. Jaguars 22–14. **Drive: 1 play, 11 yards, 0:07.**
- WAS – Terry McLaurin 49-yard pass from Carson Wentz (pass failed), 9:36. Jaguars 22–20. **Drive: 4 plays, 78 yards, 2:09.**
- WAS – Jahan Dotson 24-yard pass from Carson Wentz (pass succeeded), 1:46. Commanders 28–22. **Drive: 13 plays, 90 yards, 5:02.**

**Top passers**

- JAX – Trevor Lawrence – 24/42, 275 yards, TD, INT
- WAS – Carson Wentz – 27/41, 313 yards, 4 TD, 2 INT

**Top rushers**

- JAX – James Robinson – 11 rushes, 66 yards, TD
- WAS – Antonio Gibson – 14 rushes, 58 yards

**Top receivers**

- JAX – Christian Kirk – 6 receptions, 117 yards
- WAS – Curtis Samuel – 8 receptions, 55 yards, TD

==== Week 2: vs. Indianapolis Colts ====
Week Two: Indianapolis Colts at Jacksonville Jaguars – Game summary

Quarter	1	2	3	4	Total
Colts	0	0	0	0	**0**
**Jaguars**	7	10	7	0	**24**

at TIAA Bank Field, Jacksonville, Florida

- Date: September 18
- Game time: 1:00 p.m. EDT
- Game weather: Cloudy, 78 °F (26 °C)
- Game attendance: 58,360
- Referee: Alex Kemp
- TV announcers (CBS): Tom McCarthy and Tiki Barber
- Recap, Game Book

Game information

**First quarter**

- JAX – Christian Kirk 10-yard pass from Trevor Lawrence (Riley Patterson kick), 2:21. Jaguars 7–0. **Drive: 15 plays, 68 yards, 9:11.**

**Second quarter**

- JAX – James Robinson 37-yard run (Riley Patterson kick), 7:52. Jaguars 14–0. **Drive: 6 plays, 79 yards, 3:40.**
- JAX – Riley Patterson 52-yard field goal, 1:43. Jaguars 17–0. **Drive: 10 plays, 41 yards, 4:00.**

**Third quarter**

- JAX – Christian Kirk 5-yard pass from Trevor Lawrence (Riley Patterson kick), 0:17. Jaguars 24–0. **Drive: 12 plays, 92 yards, 7:42.**

**Fourth quarter**

- No scoring plays.

**Top passers**

- IND – Matt Ryan – 16/30, 195 yards, 3 INT
- JAX – Trevor Lawrence – 25/30, 235 yards, 2 TD

**Top rushers**

- IND – Johnathan Taylor – 9 rushes, 54 yards
- JAX – James Robinson – 23 rushes, 64 yards, TD

**Top receivers**

- IND – Ashton Dulin – 5 receptions, 79 yards
- JAX – Christian Kirk – 6 receptions, 78 yards, 2 TD

==== Week 3: at Los Angeles Chargers ====
Week Three: Jacksonville Jaguars at Los Angeles Chargers – Game summary

Quarter	1	2	3	4	Total
**Jaguars**	0	16	15	7	**38**
Chargers	0	7	3	0	**10**

at SoFi Stadium, Inglewood, California

- Date: September 25
- Game time: 4:05 p.m. EDT/1:05 p.m. PDT
- Game weather: 81 °F (27 °C)
- Game attendance: 67,964
- Referee: Craig Wrolstad
- TV announcers (CBS): Greg Gumbel, Adam Archuleta and AJ Ross
- Recap, Game Book

Game information

**First quarter**

- No scoring plays.

**Second quarter**

- JAX – Riley Patterson 22-yard field goal, 14:57. Jaguars 3–0. **Drive: 12 plays, 63 yards, 5:14.**
- JAX – Riley Patterson 23-yard field goal, 13:52. Jaguars 6–0. **Drive: 4 plays, 0 yards, 0:49.**
- JAX – Zay Jones 14-yard pass from Trevor Lawrence (Riley Patterson kick), 10:23. Jaguars 13–0. **Drive: 5 plays, 28 yards, 1:58.**
- LAC – Mike Williams 15-yard pass from Justin Herbert (Dustin Hopkins kick), 6:10. Jaguars 13–7. **Drive: 9 plays, 75 yards, 4:13.**
- JAX – Riley Patterson 23-yard field goal, 1:02. Jaguars 16–7. **Drive: 11 plays, 70 yards, 5:08.**

**Third quarter**

- LAC – Dustin Hopkins 25-yard field goal, 11:51. Jaguars 16–10. **Drive: 10 plays, 68 yards, 3:09.**
- JAX – James Robinson 50-yard run (Riley Patterson kick), 10:38. Jaguars 23–10. **Drive: 5 plays, 75 yards, 1:13.**
- JAX – Christian Kirk 4-yard pass from Trevor Lawrence (pass succeeded), 1:15. Jaguars 31–10. **Drive: 14 plays, 60 yards, 8:27**

**Fourth quarter**

- JAX – Marvin Jones 11-yard pass from Trevor Lawrence (Riley Patterson kick), 4:54. Jaguars 38–10. **Drive: 14 plays, 68 yards, 9:10**

**Top passers**

- JAX – Trevor Lawrence – 28/39, 262 yards, 3 TD
- LAC – Justin Herbert – 25/45, 297 yards, TD, INT

**Top rushers**

- JAX – James Robinson – 17 rushes, 100 yards, TD
- LAC – Sony Michel – 5 rushes, 22 yards

**Top receivers**

- JAX – Zay Jones – 10 receptions, 85 yards, TD
- LAC – Josh Palmer – 6 receptions, 99 yards

The win snapped the Jaguars' 18-game road losing streak, tied for the eighth-longest in NFL history, and marked their first road victory over the Chargers, ending a five-game skid in road games against them.

==== Week 4: at Philadelphia Eagles ====
Week Four: Jacksonville Jaguars at Philadelphia Eagles – Game summary

Quarter	1	2	3	4	Total
Jaguars	14	0	0	7	**21**
**Eagles**	0	20	0	9	**29**

at Lincoln Financial Field, Philadelphia, Pennsylvania

- Date: October 2
- Game time: 1:00 p.m. EDT
- Game weather: Rain, 59 °F (15 °C)
- Game attendance: 69,879
- Referee: Shawn Hochuli
- TV announcers (CBS): Spero Dedes, Jay Feely and Aditi Kinkhabwala
- Recap, Game Book

Game information

**First quarter**

- JAX – Andre Cisco 59–yard interception return (Riley Patterson kick), 11:15. Jaguars 7–0.
- JAX – Jamal Agnew 4-yard pass from Trevor Lawrence (Riley Patterson kick), 3:50. Jaguars 14–0. **Drive: 8 plays, 80 yards, 4:32.**

**Second quarter**

- PHI – Jalen Hurts 3-yard run (Jake Elliott kick), 9:13. Jaguars 14–7. **Drive: 7 plays, 57 yards, 4:13.**
- PHI – Miles Sanders 10-yard run (Jake Elliott kick), 3:55. Tied 14–14. **Drive: 9 plays, 71 yards, 4:29.**
- PHI – Kenneth Gainwell 10-yard run (kick failed), 0:26. Eagles 20–14. **Drive: 8 plays, 35 yards, 2:34.**

**Third quarter**

- No scoring plays.

**Fourth quarter**

- PHI – Jake Elliot 28-yard field goal, 13:42. Eagles 23–14. **Drive: 11 plays, 78 yards, 5:35.**
- PHI – Miles Sanders 5-yard run (pass failed), 8:49. Eagles 29–14. **Drive: 6 plays, 24 yards, 3:17.**
- JAX – Jamal Agnew 8-yard pass from Trevor Lawrence (Riley Patterson kick), 7:19. Eagles 29–21. **Drive: 6 plays, 68 yards, 1:30.**

**Top passers**

- JAX – Trevor Lawrence – 11/23, 174 yards, 2 TD, INT
- PHI – Jalen Hurts – 16/25, 204 yards, INT

**Top rushers**

- JAX – Travis Etienne – 8 rushes, 32 yards
- PHI – Miles Sanders – 27 rushes, 134 yards, 2 TD

**Top receivers**

- JAX – Christian Kirk – 2 receptions, 60 yards
- PHI – A. J. Brown – 5 receptions, 95 yards

==== Week 5: vs. Houston Texans ====
Week Five: Houston Texans at Jacksonville Jaguars – Game summary

Quarter	1	2	3	4	Total
**Texans**	0	6	0	7	**13**
Jaguars	3	3	0	0	**6**

at TIAA Bank Field, Jacksonville, Florida

- Date: October 9
- Game time: 1:00 p.m. EDT
- Game weather: Partly cloudy and sunny, 80 °F (27 °C)
- Game attendance: 60,018
- Referee: Ronald Torbert
- TV announcers (CBS): Spero Dedes, Jay Feely and Aditi Kinkhabwala
- Recap, Game Book

Game information

**First quarter**

- JAX – Riley Patterson 26-yard field goal, 1:22. Jaguars 3–0. **Drive: 11 plays, 60 yards, 4:03.**

**Second quarter**

- HOU – Kaʻimi Fairbairn 50-yard field goal, 12:24. Tied 3–3. **Drive: 8 plays, 44 yards, 3:58.**
- HOU – Kaʻimi Fairbairn 51-yard field goal, 3:23. Texans 6–3. **Drive: 8 plays, 30 yards, 4:44.**
- JAX – Riley Patterson 45-yard field goal, 0:06. Tied 6–6. **Drive: 9 plays, 51 yards, 3:17.**

**Third quarter**

- No scoring plays.

**Fourth quarter**

- HOU – Dameon Pierce 1-yard run (Kaʻimi Fairbairn kick), 3:11. Texans 13–6. **Drive: 12 plays, 74 yards, 6:48.**

**Top passers**

- HOU – Davis Mills – 16/24, 140 yards
- JAX – Trevor Lawrence – 25/47, 286 yards, 2 INT

**Top rushers**

- HOU – Dameon Pierce – 26 rushes, 99 yards, TD
- JAX – Travis Etienne – 10 rushes, 71 yards

**Top receivers**

- HOU – Nico Collins – 4 receptions, 65 yards
- JAX – Marvin Jones – 7 receptions, 104 yards

==== Week 6: at Indianapolis Colts ====
Week Six: Jacksonville Jaguars at Indianapolis Colts – Game summary

Quarter	1	2	3	4	Total
Jaguars	7	7	7	6	**27**
**Colts**	0	13	6	15	**34**

at Lucas Oil Stadium, Indianapolis, Indiana

- Date: October 16
- Game time: 1:00 p.m. EDT
- Game weather: Sunny, 62 °F (17 °C) (retractable roof open)
- Game attendance: 65,749
- Referee: Jerome Boger
- TV announcers (CBS): Andrew Catalon, James Lofton and Amanda Renner
- Recap, Game Book

Game information

**First quarter**

- JAX – Trevor Lawrence 1-yard run (Riley Patterson kick), 3:48. Jaguars 7–0. **Drive: 6 plays, 56 yards, 3:30.**

**Second quarter**

- IND – Chase McLaughlin 28-yard field goal, 13:56. Jaguars 7–3. **Drive: 13 plays, 67 yards, 4:52.**
- JAX – JaMycal Hasty 61-yard run (Riley Patterson kick), 11:27. Jaguars 14–3. **Drive: 4 plays, 75 yards, 2:29.**
- IND – Parris Campbell 4-yard pass from Matt Ryan (Chase McLaughlin kick), 2:06. Jaguars 14–10. **Drive: 8 plays, 54 yards, 4:28.**
- IND – Chase McLaughlin 42-yard field goal, 0:21. Jaguars 14–13. **Drive: 9 plays, 37 yards, 1:10.**

**Third quarter**

- JAX – Trevor Lawrence 2-yard run (Riley Patterson kick), 10:55. Jaguars 21–13. **Drive: 7 plays, 75 yards, 4:05.**
- IND – Deon Jackson 3-yard run (pass failed), 5:44. Jaguars 21–19. **Drive: 10 plays, 75 yards, 5:11.**

**Fourth quarter**

- IND – Jelani Woods 10-yard pass from Matt Ryan (Chase McLaughlin kick), 12:47. Colts 26–21. **Drive: 9 plays, 66 yards, 3:22.**
- JAX – Christian Kirk 4-yard pass from Trevor Lawrence (pass failed), 2:44. Jaguars 27–26. **Drive: 18 plays, 84 yards, 10:03**
- IND – Alec Pierce 32-yard pass from Matt Ryan (run succeeded), 0:17. Colts 34–27. **Drive: 11 plays, 66 yards, 2:27.**

**Top passers**

- JAX – Trevor Lawrence – 20/22, 165 yards, TD
- IND – Matt Ryan – 42/58, 389 yards, 3 TD

**Top rushers**

- JAX – Travis Etienne – 10 rushes, 86 yards
- IND – Deon Jackson – 12 rushes, 42 yards

**Top receivers**

- JAX – Zay Jones – 5 receptions, 42 yards
- IND – Michael Pittman Jr. – 13 receptions, 134 yards

==== Week 7: vs. New York Giants ====
Week Seven: New York Giants at Jacksonville Jaguars – Game summary

Quarter	1	2	3	4	Total
**Giants**	7	6	0	10	**23**
Jaguars	8	3	6	0	**17**

at TIAA Bank Field, Jacksonville, Florida

- Date: October 23
- Game time: 1:00 p.m. EDT
- Game weather: Sunny, 71 °F (22 °C)
- Game attendance: 65,664
- Referee: Tra Blake
- TV announcers (Fox): Chris Myers, Mark Schlereth and Kristina Pink
- Recap, Game Book

Game information

**First quarter**

- NYG – Darius Slayton 32-yard pass from Daniel Jones (Graham Gano kick), 10:21. Giants 7–0. **Drive: 9 plays, 75 yards, 4:39.**
- JAX – Travis Etienne 7-yard run (Etienne run), 6:58. Jaguars 8–7. **Drive: 6 plays, 70 yards, 3:23.**

**Second quarter**

- JAX – Riley Patterson 27-yard field goal, 13:23. Jaguars 11–7. **Drive: 12 plays, 70 yards, 5:44.**
- NYG – Graham Gano 33-yard field goal, 7:27. Jaguars 11–10. **Drive: 10 plays, 60 yards, 5:56.**
- NYG – Graham Gano 33-yard field goal, 0:28. Giants 13–11. **Drive: 12 plays, 65 yards, 2:58.**

**Third quarter**

- JAX – Trevor Lawrence 1-yard run (kick blocked), 11:45. Jaguars 17–13. **Drive: 7 plays, 73 yards, 3:15.**

**Fourth quarter**

- NYG – Daniel Jones 1-yard run (Graham Gano kick), 5:31. Giants 20–17. **Drive: 10 plays, 79 yards, 5:54.**
- NYG – Graham Gano 34-yard field goal, 1:04. Giants 23–17. **Drive: 9 plays, 61 yards, 3:25.**

**Top passers**

- NYG – Daniel Jones – 19/30, 202 yards, TD
- JAX – Trevor Lawrence – 22/43, 310 yards

**Top rushers**

- NYG – Saquon Barkley – 24 rushes, 110 yards
- JAX – Travis Etienne – 14 rushes, 114 yards, TD

**Top receivers**

- NYG – Darius Slayton – 3 receptions, 58 yards, TD
- JAX – Christian Kirk – 7 receptions, 96 yards

==== Week 8: vs. Denver Broncos ====
NFL London games

Week Eight: Denver Broncos at Jacksonville Jaguars – Game summary

Quarter	1	2	3	4	Total
**Broncos**	0	7	7	7	**21**
Jaguars	7	3	0	7	**17**

at Wembley Stadium, London, England

- Date: October 30
- Game time: 1:30 p.m. GMT/9:30 a.m. EDT
- Game weather: Mostly cloudy, 61 °F (16 °C)
- Game attendance: 86,215
- Referee: Adrian Hill
- TV announcers (WJXT/ESPN+): Steve Levy, Louis Riddick, Dan Orlovsky and Laura Rutledge
- Recap, Game Book

Game information

**First quarter**

- JAX – Evan Engram 22-yard pass from Trevor Lawrence (Riley Patterson kick), 7:40. Jaguars 7–0. **Drive: 5 plays, 37 yards, 2:56.**

**Second quarter**

- JAX – Riley Patterson 37-yard field goal, 8:43. Jaguars 10–0. **Drive: 6 plays, 54 yards, 2:09.**
- DEN – Jerry Jeudy 6-yard pass from Russell Wilson (Brandon McManus kick), 2:44. Jaguars 10–7. **Drive: 11 plays, 75 yards, 5:59.**

**Third quarter**

- DEN – Melvin Gordon 1-yard run (Brandon McManus kick), 5:07. Broncos 14–10. **Drive: 9 plays, 98 yards, 4:22.**

**Fourth quarter**

- JAX – Travis Etienne 1-yard run (Riley Patterson kick), 3:54. Jaguars 17–14. **Drive: 6 plays, 47 yards, 3:12.**
- DEN – Latavius Murray 2-yard run (Brandon McManus kick), 1:43. Broncos 21–17. **Drive: 7 plays, 80 yards, 2:11.**

**Top passers**

- DEN – Russell Wilson – 18/30, 252 yards, TD, INT
- JAX – Trevor Lawrence – 18/31, 133 yards, TD, 2 INT

**Top rushers**

- DEN – Latavius Murray – 14 rushes, 46 yards, TD
- JAX – Travis Etienne – 24 rushes, 156 yards, TD

**Top receivers**

- DEN – Greg Dulcich – 4 receptions, 87 yards
- JAX – Evan Engram – 4 receptions, 55 yards, TD

==== Week 9: vs. Las Vegas Raiders ====
Week Nine: Las Vegas Raiders at Jacksonville Jaguars – Game summary

Quarter	1	2	3	4	Total
Raiders	7	13	0	0	**20**
**Jaguars**	0	10	7	10	**27**

at TIAA Bank Field, Jacksonville, Florida

- Date: November 6
- Game time: 1:00 p.m. EST
- Game weather: 81 °F (27 °C)
- Game attendance: 62,758
- Referee: Bill Vinovich
- TV announcers (CBS): Andrew Catalon, James Lofton and Aditi Kinkhabwala
- Recap, Game Book

Game information

**First quarter**

- LV – Davante Adams 25-yard pass from Derek Carr (Daniel Carlson kick), 4:45. Raiders 7–0. **Drive: 10 plays, 71 yards, 5:28.**

**Second quarter**

- LV – Daniel Carlson 38-yard field goal, 14:08. Raiders 10–0. **Drive: 8 plays, 36 yards, 3:56.**
- LV – Davante Adams 38-yard pass from Derek Carr (Daniel Carlson kick), 10:51. Raiders 17–0. **Drive: 3 plays, 69 yards, 1:42.**
- JAX – Travis Etienne 1-yard run (Riley Patterson kick), 4:50. Raiders 17–7. **Drive: 10 plays, 75 yards, 6:01.**
- LV – Daniel Carlson 38-yard field goal, 0:45. Raiders 20–7. **Drive: 11 plays, 55 yards, 4:05.**
- JAX – Riley Patterson 44-yard field goal, 0:00. Raiders 20–10. **Drive: 8 plays, 49 yards, 0:45.**

**Third quarter**

- JAX – Christian Kirk 7-yard pass from Trevor Lawrence (Riley Patterson kick), 10:15. Raiders 20–17. **Drive: 9 plays, 45 yards, 4:45.**

**Fourth quarter**

- JAX – Travis Etienne 5-yard run (Riley Patterson kick), 14:56. Jaguars 24–20. **Drive: 12 plays, 82 yards, 7:06.**
- JAX – Riley Patterson 48-yard field goal, 1:03. Jaguars 27–20. **Drive: 4 plays, 9 yards, 1:22.**

**Top passers**

- LV – Derek Carr – 22/36, 259 yards, 2 TD
- JAX – Trevor Lawrence – 25/31, 235 yards, TD

**Top rushers**

- LV – Josh Jacobs – 17 rushes, 67 yards
- JAX – Travis Etienne – 28 rushes, 109 yards, 2 TD

**Top receivers**

- LV – Davante Adams – 10 receptions, 146 yards, 2 TD
- JAX – Christian Kirk – 8 receptions, 76 yards, TD

==== Week 10: at Kansas City Chiefs ====
Week Ten: Jacksonville Jaguars at Kansas City Chiefs – Game summary

Quarter	1	2	3	4	Total
Jaguars	0	7	3	7	**17**
**Chiefs**	7	13	7	0	**27**

at Arrowhead Stadium, Kansas City, Missouri

- Date: November 13
- Game time: 1:00 p.m. EST/12:00 p.m. CST
- Game weather: 33 °F (1 °C)
- Game attendance: 73,493
- Referee: Brad Rogers
- TV announcers (CBS): Jim Nantz, Tony Romo and Tracy Wolfson
- Recap, Game Book

Game information

**First quarter**

- KC – Kadarius Toney 6-yard pass from Patrick Mahomes (Harrison Butker kick), 3:32. Chiefs 7–0. **Drive: 5 plays, 80 yards, 2:38.**

**Second quarter**

- KC – Marquez Valdes-Scantling 18-yard pass from Patrick Mahomes (Harrison Butker kick), 9:55. Chiefs 14–0. **Drive: 3 plays, 59 yards, 1:23.**
- KC – Noah Gray 13-yard pass from Patrick Mahomes (kick failed), 0:46. Chiefs 20–0. **Drive: 8 plays, 86 yards, 2:35.**
- JAX – Christian Kirk 3-yard pass from Trevor Lawrence (Riley Patterson kick), 0:11. Chiefs 20–7. **Drive: 5 plays, 61 yards, 0:35.**

**Third quarter**

- JAX – Riley Patterson 35-yard field goal, 5:46. Chiefs 20–10. **Drive: 17 plays, 58 yards, 9:14.**
- KC – Travis Kelce 7-yard pass from Patrick Mahomes (Harrison Butker kick), 0:38. Chiefs 27–10. **Drive: 10 plays, 75 yards, 5:08.**

**Fourth quarter**

- JAX – Christian Kirk 19-yard pass from Trevor Lawrence (Riley Patterson kick), 5:26. Chiefs 27–17. **Drive: 8 plays, 54 yards, 2:29.**

**Top passers**

- JAX – Trevor Lawrence – 29/40, 259 yards, 2 TD
- KC – Patrick Mahomes – 26/35, 331 yards, 4 TD, INT

**Top rushers**

- JAX – Travis Etienne – 11 rushes, 45 yards
- KC – Isiah Pacheco – 16 rushes, 82 yards

**Top receivers**

- JAX – Christian Kirk – 9 receptions, 102 yards, 2 TD
- KC – Travis Kelce – 6 receptions, 81 yards, TD

==== Week 12: vs. Baltimore Ravens ====
Week Twelve: Baltimore Ravens at Jacksonville Jaguars – Game summary

Quarter	1	2	3	4	Total
Ravens	6	3	3	15	**27**
**Jaguars**	0	10	0	18	**28**

at TIAA Bank Field, Jacksonville, Florida

- Date: November 27
- Game time: 1:25 p.m. EST
- Game weather: 74 °F (23 °C)
- Game attendance: 59,560
- Referee: Land Clark
- TV announcers (CBS): Andrew Catalon, James Lofton and Amanda Renner
- Recap, Game Book

Game information

**First quarter**

- BAL – Justin Tucker 27-yard field goal, 9:23. Ravens 3–0. **Drive: 11 plays, 65 yards, 5:37.**
- BAL – Justin Tucker 29-yard field goal, 2:03. Ravens 6–0. **Drive: 8 plays, 38 yards, 3:58.**

**Second quarter**

- JAX – JaMycal Hasty 28-yard pass from Trevor Lawrence (Riley Patterson kick), 9:57. Jaguars 7–6. **Drive: 4 plays, 50 yards, 1:55.**
- BAL – Justin Tucker 55-yard field goal, 4:51. Ravens 9–7. **Drive: 12 plays, 38 yards, 5:06.**
- JAX – Riley Patterson 22-yard field goal, 0:09. Jaguars 10–9. **Drive: 12 plays, 71 yards, 4:42.**

**Third quarter**

- BAL – Justin Tucker 24-yard field goal, 7:51. Ravens 12–10. **Drive: 10 plays, 74 yards, 5:29.**

**Fourth quarter**

- BAL – Gus Edwards 1-yard run (Justin Tucker kick), 13:07. Ravens 19–10. **Drive: 7 plays, 25 yards, 2:12.**
- JAX – Jamal Agnew 1-yard pass from Trevor Lawrence (Riley Patterson kick), 5:55. Ravens 19–17. **Drive: 14 plays, 75 yards, 7:12.**
- JAX – Riley Patterson 29-yard field goal, 4:19. Jaguars 20–19. **Drive: 4 plays, 5 yards, 1:23.**
- BAL – Josh Oliver 12-yard pass from Lamar Jackson (pass succeeded), 2:02. Ravens 27–20. **Drive: 6 plays, 75 yards, 2:17.**
- JAX – Marvin Jones 10-yard pass from Trevor Lawrence (pass succeeded), 0:14. Jaguars 28–27. **Drive: 10 plays, 75 yards, 1:48.**

**Top passers**

- BAL – Lamar Jackson – 16/32, 254 yards, TD
- JAX – Trevor Lawrence – 29/37, 321 yards, 3 TD

**Top rushers**

- BAL – Lamar Jackson – 14 rushes, 89 yards
- JAX – JaMycal Hasty – 12 rushes, 28 yards

**Top receivers**

- BAL – Josh Oliver – 4 receptions, 76 yards, TD
- JAX – Zay Jones – 11 receptions, 145 yards

==== Week 13: at Detroit Lions ====
Week Thirteen: Jacksonville Jaguars at Detroit Lions – Game summary

Quarter	1	2	3	4	Total
Jaguars	3	3	8	0	**14**
**Lions**	14	9	7	10	**40**

at Ford Field, Detroit, Michigan

- Date: December 4
- Game time: 1:00 p.m. EST
- Game weather: None (indoor stadium)
- Game attendance: 60,743
- Referee: Jerome Boger
- TV announcers (Fox): Chris Myers, Robert Smith and Jen Hale
- Recap, Game Book

Game information

**First quarter**

- DET – Jamaal Williams 1-yard run (Michael Badgley kick), 10:55. Lions 7–0. **Drive: 7 plays, 38 yards, 3:13.**
- JAX – Riley Patterson 31-yard field goal, 7:42. Lions 7–3. **Drive: 10 plays, 62 yards, 3:13.**
- DET – Amon-Ra St. Brown 10-yard pass from Jared Goff (Michael Badgley kick), 4:04. Lions 14–3. **Drive: 7 plays, 75 yards, 3:38.**

**Second quarter**

- DET – Michael Badgley 45-yard field goal, 12:39. Lions 17–3. **Drive: 9 plays, 59 yards, 3:17.**
- DET – Michael Badgley 47-yard field goal, 6:57. Lions 20–3. **Drive: 8 plays, 41 yards, 4:35.**
- JAX – Riley Patterson 42-yard field goal, 4:15. Lions 20–6. **Drive: 9 plays, 51 yards, 2:43.**
- DET – Michael Badgley 38-yard field goal, 0:31. Lions 23–6. **Drive: 11 plays, 47 yards, 3:44.**

**Third quarter**

- DET – D'Andre Swift 1-yard run (Michael Badgley kick), 10:35. Lions 30–6. **Drive: 10 plays, 61 yards, 4:25.**
- JAX – Evan Engram 3-yard pass from Trevor Lawrence (pass succeeded), 2:54. Lions 30–14. **Drive: 16 plays, 75 yards, 7:41.**

**Fourth quarter**

- DET – Michael Badgley 44-yard field goal, 12:21. Lions 33–14. **Drive: 12 plays, 49 yards, 5:33.**
- DET – Amon-Ra St. Brown 4-yard pass from Jared Goff (Michael Badgley kick), 2:43. Lions 40–14. **Drive: 12 plays, 68 yards, 7:33.**

**Top passers**

- JAX – Trevor Lawrence – 17/31, 179 yards, TD
- DET – Jared Goff – 31/41, 340 yards, 2 TD

**Top rushers**

- JAX – Travis Etienne – 13 rushes, 54 yards
- DET – D'Andre Swift – 14 rushes, 62 yards, TD

**Top receivers**

- JAX – Christian Kirk – 6 receptions, 104 yards
- DET – Amon-Ra St. Brown – 11 receptions, 114 yards, 2 TD

==== Week 14: at Tennessee Titans ====
Week Fourteen: Jacksonville Jaguars at Tennessee Titans – Game summary

Quarter	1	2	3	4	Total
**Jaguars**	7	13	13	3	**36**
Titans	14	0	0	8	**22**

at Nissan Stadium, Nashville, Tennessee

- Date: December 11
- Game time: 1:00 p.m. EST/12:00 p.m. CST
- Game weather: Cloudy, 50 °F (10 °C)
- Game attendance: 68,409
- Referee: Clay Martin
- TV announcers (CBS): Andrew Catalon, James Lofton and Amanda Renner
- Recap, Game Book

Game information

**First quarter**

- TEN – Derrick Henry 3-yard run (Randy Bullock kick), 9:09. Titans 7–0. **Drive: 10 plays, 76 yards, 5:51.**
- JAX – Evan Engram 12-yard pass from Trevor Lawrence (Riley Patterson kick), 6:01. Tied 7–7. **Drive: 3 plays, 20 yards, 0:45.**
- TEN – Chig Okonkwo 10-yard pass from Ryan Tannehill (Randy Bullock kick), 3:03. Titans 14–7. **Drive: 6 plays, 75 yards, 2:58.**

**Second quarter**

- JAX – Riley Patterson 37-yard field goal, 8:52. Titans 14–10. **Drive: 7 plays, 35 yards, 4:04.**
- JAX – Riley Patterson 43-yard field goal, 3:10. Titans 14–13. **Drive: 10 plays, 46 yards, 4:06.**
- JAX – Zay Jones 20-yard pass from Trevor Lawrence (Riley Patterson kick), 0:11. Jaguars 20–14. **Drive: 6 plays, 78 yards, 1:38.**

**Third quarter**

- JAX – Trevor Lawrence 1-yard run (Riley Patterson kick), 7:53. Jaguars 27–14. **Drive: 12 plays, 72 yards, 7:07.**
- JAX – Evan Engram 21-yard pass from Trevor Lawrence (pass failed), 3:07. Jaguars 33–14. **Drive: 5 plays, 63 yards, 2:09.**

**Fourth quarter**

- JAX – Riley Patterson 33-yard field goal, 10:52. Jaguars 36–14. **Drive: 6 plays, 16 yards, 3:12.**
- TEN – Nick Westbrook-Ikhine 2-yard pass from Ryan Tannehill (pass succeeded), 7:15. Jaguars 36–22. **Drive: 10 plays, 64 yards, 3:37.**

**Top passers**

- JAX – Trevor Lawrence – 30/42, 368 yards, 3 TD
- TEN – Ryan Tannehill – 25/38, 254 yards, 2 TD, INT

**Top rushers**

- JAX – Travis Etienne – 17 rushes, 32 yards
- TEN – Derrick Henry – 17 rushes, 121 yards, TD

**Top receivers**

- JAX – Evan Engram – 11 receptions, 162 yards, 2 TD
- TEN – Austin Hooper – 5 receptions, 68 yards

==== Week 15: vs. Dallas Cowboys ====
Week Fifteen: Dallas Cowboys at Jacksonville Jaguars – Game summary

Quarter	1	2	3	4	OT	Total
Cowboys	7	14	6	7	0	**34**
**Jaguars**	0	7	17	10	6	**40**

at TIAA Bank Field, Jacksonville, Florida

- Date: December 18
- Game time: 1:00 p.m. EST
- Game weather: Sunny, 51 °F (11 °C)
- Game attendance: 69,050
- Referee: Shawn Smith
- TV announcers (Fox): Kevin Burkhardt, Greg Olsen and Erin Andrews
- Recap, Game Book

Game information

**First quarter**

- DAL – Ezekiel Elliott 10-yard run (Brett Maher kick), 4:31. Cowboys 7–0. **Drive: 6 plays, 41 yards, 2:54.**

**Second quarter**

- DAL – Peyton Hendershot 20-yard pass from Dak Prescott (Brett Maher kick), 13:01. Cowboys 14–0. **Drive: 10 plays, 86 yards, 4:50.**
- JAX – Zay Jones 5-yard pass from Trevor Lawrence (Riley Patterson kick), 7:45. Cowboys 14–7. **Drive: 9 plays, 75 yards, 5:16.**
- DAL – Noah Brown 1-yard pass from Dak Prescott (Brett Maher kick), 1:55. Cowboys 21–7. **Drive: 11 plays, 66 yards, 5:50.**

**Third quarter**

- JAX – Riley Patterson 33-yard field goal, 10:35. Cowboys 21–10. **Drive: 10 plays, 61 yards, 4:25.**
- DAL – Brett Maher 24-yard field goal, 7:36. Cowboys 24–10. **Drive: 8 plays, 69 yards, 2:59.**
- DAL – Brett Maher 53-yard field goal, 5:21. Cowboys 27–10. **Drive: 4 plays, 7 yards, 1:06.**
- JAX – Zay Jones 59-yard pass from Trevor Lawrence (Riley Patterson kick), 3:57. Cowboys 27–17. **Drive: 3 plays, 75 yards, 1:24.**
- JAX – Marvin Jones 10-yard pass from Trevor Lawrence (Riley Patterson kick), 1:23. Cowboys 27–24. **Drive: 4 plays, 39 yards, 1:30.**

**Fourth quarter**

- JAX – Zay Jones 3-yard pass from Trevor Lawrence (Riley Patterson kick), 10:03. Jaguars 31–27. **Drive: 8 plays, 75 yards, 4:14.**
- DAL – Noah Brown 13-yard pass from Dak Prescott (Brett Maher kick), 3:02. Cowboys 34–31. **Drive: 13 plays, 75 yards, 7:01.**
- JAX – Riley Patterson 48-yard field goal, 0:00. Tied 34–34. **Drive: 7 plays, 41 yards, 1:01.**

**Overtime**

- JAX – Rayshawn Jenkins 52–yard interception return, 6:52. Jaguars 40–34.

**Top passers**

- DAL – Dak Prescott – 23/30, 256 yards, 3 TD, 2 INT
- JAX – Trevor Lawrence – 27/42, 321 yards, 4 TD, INT

**Top rushers**

- DAL – Tony Pollard – 19 rushes, 75 yards
- JAX – Travis Etienne – 19 rushes, 103 yards

**Top receivers**

- DAL – CeeDee Lamb – 7 receptions, 126 yards
- JAX – Zay Jones – 6 receptions, 109 yards, 3 TD

==== Week 16: at New York Jets ====
Week Sixteen: Jacksonville Jaguars at New York Jets – Game summary

Quarter	1	2	3	4	Total
**Jaguars**	3	10	3	3	**19**
Jets	3	0	0	0	**3**

at MetLife Stadium, East Rutherford, New Jersey

- Date: December 22
- Game time: 8:15 p.m. EST
- Game weather: Rain, 45 °F (7 °C)
- Game attendance: 70,043
- Referee: Brad Allen
- TV announcers (WFOX-TV/Prime Video): Al Michaels, Kirk Herbstreit and Kaylee Hartung
- Recap, Game Book

Game information

**First quarter**

- NYJ – Greg Zuerlein 37-yard field goal, 11:37. Jets 3–0. **Drive: 4 plays, -3 yards, 1:59.**
- JAX – Riley Patterson 32-yard field goal, 7:15. Tied 3–3. **Drive: 10 plays, 61 yards, 4:22.**

**Second quarter**

- JAX – Trevor Lawrence 1-yard run (Riley Patterson kick), 11:26. Jaguars 10–3. **Drive: 16 plays, 96 yards, 8:15.**
- JAX – Riley Patterson 45-yard field goal, 2:55. Jaguars 13–3. **Drive: 8 plays, 61 yards, 4:44.**

**Third quarter**

- JAX – Riley Patterson 41-yard field goal, 7:06. Jaguars 16–3. **Drive: 12 plays, 49 yards, 6:24.**

**Fourth quarter**

- JAX – Riley Patterson 37-yard field goal, 3:46. Jaguars 19–3. **Drive: 4 plays, 5 yards, 0:24.**

**Top passers**

- JAX – Trevor Lawrence – 20/31, 229 yards
- NYJ – Zach Wilson – 9/18, 92 yards, INT

**Top rushers**

- JAX – Travis Etienne – 22 rushes, 83 yards
- NYJ – Chris Streveler – 9 rushes, 54 yards

**Top receivers**

- JAX – Evan Engram – 7 receptions, 113 yards
- NYJ – Tyler Conklin – 5 receptions, 44 yards

==== Week 17: at Houston Texans ====
Week Seventeen: Jacksonville Jaguars at Houston Texans – Game summary

Quarter	1	2	3	4	Total
**Jaguars**	7	14	7	3	**31**
Texans	0	0	3	0	**3**

at NRG Stadium, Houston, Texas

- Date: January 1
- Game time: 1:00 p.m. EST/12:00 p.m. CST
- Game weather: None (retractable roof closed)
- Game attendance: 64,581
- Referee: Scott Novak
- TV announcers (CBS): Andrew Catalon, James Lofton and Aditi Kinkhabwala
- Recap, Game Book

Game information

**First quarter**

- JAX – JaMycal Hasty 5-yard run (Riley Patterson kick), 8:24. Jaguars 7–0. **Drive: 8 plays, 45 yards, 3:06.**

**Second quarter**

- JAX – Travis Etienne 62-yard run (Riley Patterson kick), 12:21. Jaguars 14–0. **Drive: 1 play, 62 yards, 0:09.**
- JAX – Tyson Campbell 12–yard fumble return (Riley Patterson kick), 11:35. Jaguars 21–0.

**Third quarter**

- JAX – Snoop Conner 3-yard run (Riley Patterson kick), 9:28. Jaguars 28–0. **Drive: 11 plays, 75 yards, 5:32.**
- HOU – Kaʻimi Fairbairn 56-yard field goal, 5:49. Jaguars 28–3. **Drive: 7 plays, 37 yards, 3:39.**

**Fourth quarter**

- JAX – Riley Patterson 53-yard field goal, 6:06. Jaguars 31–3. **Drive: 4 plays, 5 yards, 2:09.**

**Top passers**

- JAX – Trevor Lawrence – 17/21, 152 yards, INT
- HOU – Davis Mills – 22/40, 202 yards

**Top rushers**

- JAX – Travis Etienne – 9 rushes, 108 yards, TD
- HOU – Davis Mills – 4 rushes, 33 yards

**Top receivers**

- JAX – Marvin Jones – 6 receptions, 61 yards
- HOU – Brandin Cooks – 4 receptions, 39 yards

==== Week 18: vs. Tennessee Titans ====
Week Eighteen: Tennessee Titans at Jacksonville Jaguars – Game summary

Quarter	1	2	3	4	Total
Titans	3	10	3	0	**16**
**Jaguars**	0	7	3	10	**20**

at TIAA Bank Field, Jacksonville, Florida

- Date: January 7
- Game time: 8:15 p.m. EST
- Game weather: 59 °F (15 °C)
- Game attendance: 70,050
- Referee: Bill Vinovich
- TV announcers (ESPN/ABC): Joe Buck, Troy Aikman and Lisa Salters
- Recap, Game Book

Game information

**First quarter**

- TEN – Randy Bullock 51-yard field goal, 1:23. Titans 3–0. **Drive: 17 plays, 51 yards, 9:59.**

**Second quarter**

- TEN – Chig Okonkwo 21-yard pass from Joshua Dobbs (Randy Bullock kick), 5:32. Titans 10–0. **Drive: 7 play, 69 yards, 3:52.**
- JAX – Christian Kirk 25-yard pass from Trevor Lawrence (Riley Patterson kick), 2:36. Titans 10–7. **Drive: 6 play, 50 yards, 2:56.**
- TEN – Randy Bullock 39-yard field goal, 0:00. Titans 13–7. **Drive: 11 plays, 50 yards, 2:36.**

**Third quarter**

- JAX – Riley Patterson 26-yard field goal, 10:09. Titans 13–10. **Drive: 12 plays, 64 yards, 4:51.**
- TEN – Randy Bullock 41-yard field goal, 6:02. Titans 16–10. **Drive: 10 plays, 45 yards, 4:07.**

**Fourth quarter**

- JAX – Riley Patterson 36-yard field goal, 14:49. Titans 16–13. **Drive: 4 plays, 7 yards, 0:52.**
- JAX – Josh Allen 37-yard fumble return (Riley Patterson kick), 2:51. Jaguars 20–16.

**Top passers**

- TEN – Joshua Dobbs – 20/29, 179 yards, TD, INT
- JAX – Trevor Lawrence – 20/32, 212 yards, TD

**Top rushers**

- TEX – Derrick Henry – 30 rushes, 109 yards
- JAX – Travis Etienne – 7 rushes, 17 yards

**Top receivers**

- TEN – Chig Okonkwo – 3 receptions, 42 yards, TD
- JAX – Christian Kirk – 6 receptions, 99 yards, TD

=== Standings ===
==== Division ====
AFC South
	W	L	T	PCT	DIV	CONF	PF	PA	STK
^{(4)} Jacksonville Jaguars	9	8	0	.529	4–2	8–4	404	350	W5
Tennessee Titans	7	10	0	.412	3–3	5–7	298	359	L7
Indianapolis Colts	4	12	1	.265	1–4–1	4–7–1	289	427	L7
Houston Texans	3	13	1	.206	3–2–1	3–8–1	289	420	W1

==== Conference ====
AFC
#	Team	Division	W	L	T	PCT	DIV	CONF	SOS	SOV	STK
**Division leaders**
1	Kansas City Chiefs	West	14	3	0	.824	6–0	9–3	.453	.422	W5
2	Buffalo Bills	East	13	3	0	.813	4–2	9–2	.489	.471	W7
3	Cincinnati Bengals	North	12	4	0	.750	3–3	8–3	.507	.490	W8
4	Jacksonville Jaguars	South	9	8	0	.529	4–2	8–4	.467	.438	W5
**Wild cards**
5 (Note: LA Chargers claimed the No. 5 seed over Baltimore based on conference record (7–5 vs. 6–6).)	Los Angeles Chargers	West	10	7	0	.588	2–4	7–5	.443	.341	L1
6	Baltimore Ravens	North	10	7	0	.588	3–3	6–6	.509	.456	L2
7 (Note: Miami finished ahead of Pittsburgh based on head-to-head victory, claiming the 7th and final playoff spot.)	Miami Dolphins	East	9	8	0	.529	3–3	7–5	.537	.457	W1
**Did not qualify for the postseason**
8	Pittsburgh Steelers	North	9	8	0	.529	3–3	5–7	.519	.451	W4
9	New England Patriots	East	8	9	0	.471	3–3	6–6	.502	.415	L1
10 (Note: NY Jets and Tennessee finished ahead of Cleveland based on conference record (5–7 vs. 4–8).) (Note: NY Jets finished ahead of Tennessee based on common record (3–3 vs. 2–4 against: Buffalo, Cincinnati, Denver, Green Bay, Jacksonville).)	New York Jets	East	7	10	0	.412	2–4	5–7	.538	.458	L6
11	Tennessee Titans	South	7	10	0	.412	3–3	5–7	.509	.336	L7
12	Cleveland Browns	North	7	10	0	.412	3–3	4–8	.524	.492	L1
13	Las Vegas Raiders	West	6	11	0	.353	3–3	5–7	.474	.397	L3
14	Denver Broncos	West	5	12	0	.294	1–5	3–9	.481	.465	W1
15	Indianapolis Colts	South	4	12	1	.265	1–4–1	4–7–1	.512	.500	L7
16	Houston Texans	South	3	13	1	.206	3–2–1	3–8–1	.481	.402	W1
**Tiebreakers** (Note: When breaking ties for three or more teams under the NFL's rules, they are first broken within divisions, then comparing only the highest ranked remaining team from each division.)

== Postseason ==
=== Schedule ===
Round	Date	Opponent (seed)	Result	Record	Venue	Recap
Wild Card	January 14	Los Angeles Chargers (5)	W 31–30	1–0	TIAA Bank Field	Recap
Divisional	January 21	at Kansas City Chiefs (1)	L 20–27	1–1	Arrowhead Stadium	Recap

=== Game summaries ===
==== AFC Wild Card Playoffs: vs. (5) Los Angeles Chargers ====
AFC Wild Card Playoffs: (5) Los Angeles Chargers at (4) Jacksonville Jaguars – Game summary

Quarter	1	2	3	4	Total
Chargers	17	10	3	0	30
Jaguars	0	7	13	11	31

at TIAA Bank Field, Jacksonville, Florida

- Date: January 14, 2023
- Game time: 8:15 p.m. EST
- Game weather: 45 °F (7 °C)
- Game attendance: 70,250
- Referee: Shawn Smith
- TV announcers (NBC): Al Michaels, Tony Dungy, and Kaylee Hartung
- Recap, Game Book

Game information

First quarter

- LAC – Austin Ekeler 13-yard run (Cameron Dicker kick), 13:33. Chargers 7–0. Drive: 2 plays, 18 yards, 0:40.
- LAC – Cameron Dicker 22-yard field goal, 5:30. Chargers 10–0. Drive: 12 plays, 57 yards, 4:32.
- LAC – Austin Ekeler 6-yard run (Cameron Dicker kick), 0:44. Chargers 17–0. Drive: 3 plays, 16 yards, 1:18.

Second quarter

- LAC – Gerald Everett 9-yard pass from Justin Herbert (Cameron Dicker kick), 7:12. Chargers 24–0. Drive: 11 plays, 62 yards, 6:24.
- LAC – Cameron Dicker 23-yard field goal, 4:25. Chargers 27–0. Drive: 4 plays, 1 yard, 0:49.
- JAX – Evan Engram 9-yard pass from Trevor Lawrence (Riley Patterson kick), 0:24. Chargers 27–7. Drive: 7 plays, 47 yards, 1:25.

Third quarter

- JAX – Marvin Jones 6-yard pass from Trevor Lawrence (Riley Patterson kick), 5:11. Chargers 27–14. Drive: 14 plays, 89 yards, 7:17.
- LAC – Cameron Dicker 50-yard field goal, 2:58. Chargers 30–14. Drive: 7 plays, 45 yards, 2:13.
- JAX – Zay Jones 39-yard pass from Trevor Lawrence (pass failed), 0:44. Chargers 30–20. Drive: 5 plays, 68 yards, 2:14.

Fourth quarter

- JAX – Christian Kirk 9-yard pass from Trevor Lawrence (Trevor Lawrence run), 5:25. Chargers 30–28. Drive: 9 plays, 70 yards, 3:22.
- JAX – Riley Patterson 36-yard field goal, 0:00. Jaguars 31–30. Drive: 10 plays, 61 yards, 3:09.

Top passers

- LAC – Justin Herbert – 25/43, 273 yards, TD
- JAX – Trevor Lawrence – 28/47, 288 yards, 4 TD, 4 INT

Top rushers

- LAC – Austin Ekeler – 13 rushes, 35 yards, 2 TD
- JAX – Travis Etienne – 20 rushes, 109 yards

Top receivers

- LAC – Gerald Everett – 6 receptions, 109 yards, TD
- JAX – Evan Engram – 7 receptions, 93 yards, TD

==== AFC Divisional Playoffs: at (1) Kansas City Chiefs ====
AFC Divisional Playoffs: (4) Jacksonville Jaguars at (1) Kansas City Chiefs – Game summary

Quarter	1	2	3	4	Total
Jaguars	7	3	0	10	20
Chiefs	7	10	3	7	27

at Arrowhead Stadium, Kansas City, Missouri

- Date: January 21, 2023
- Game time: 4:35 p.m. EST/3:35 p.m. CST
- Game weather: 37 °F (3 °C)
- Game attendance: 73,220
- Referee: Shawn Hochuli
- TV announcers (NBC): Mike Tirico, Cris Collinsworth, and Melissa Stark
- Recap, Game Book

Game information

First quarter

- KC – Travis Kelce 8-yard pass from Patrick Mahomes (Harrison Butker kick), 7:56. Chiefs 7–0. Drive: 12 plays, 83 yards, 6:00.
- JAX – Christian Kirk 10-yard pass from Trevor Lawrence (Riley Patterson kick), 5:04. Tied 7–7. Drive: 5 plays, 39 yards, 2:52.

Second quarter

- KC – Harrison Butker 50-yard field goal, 14:09. Chiefs 10–7. Drive: 11 plays, 43 yards, 5:55.
- KC – Travis Kelce 1-yard pass from Chad Henne (Harrison Butker kick), 3:54. Chiefs 17–7. Drive: 12 plays, 98 yards, 6:05.
- JAX – Riley Patterson 41-yard field goal, 0:27. Chiefs 17–10. Drive: 11 plays, 52 yards, 3:27.

Third quarter

- KC – Harrison Butker 50-yard field goal, 0:08. Chiefs 20–10. Drive: 5 plays, 29 yards, 2:17.

Fourth quarter

- JAX – Travis Etienne 4-yard rush (Riley Patterson kick), 11:49. Chiefs 20–17. Drive: 7 plays, 75 yards, 3:19.
- KC – Marquez Valdes-Scantling 6-yard pass from Patrick Mahomes (Harrison Butker kick), 7:08. Chiefs 27–17. Drive: 10 plays, 75 yards, 4:41.
- JAX – Riley Patterson 48-yard field goal, 0:25. Chiefs 27–20. Drive: 6 plays, 37 yards, 0:39.

Top passers

- JAX – Trevor Lawrence – 24/39, 217 yards, TD, INT
- KC – Patrick Mahomes – 22/30, 195 yards, 2 TD

Top rushers

- JAX – Travis Etienne – 10 rushes, 62 yards, TD
- KC – Isiah Pacheco – 12 rushes, 95 yards

Top receivers

- JAX – Zay Jones – 5 receptions, 83 yards
- KC – Travis Kelce – 14 receptions, 98 yards, 2 TD

== Statistics ==
=== Team ===
Category	Total yards	Yards per game	NFL rank (out of 32)
Passing offense	3,959	232.9	10th
Rushing offense	2,116	124.5	14th
Total offense	6,075	357.4	10th
Passing defense	4,055	238.5	28th
Rushing defense	1,951	114.8	12th
Total defense	6,006	353.3	24th

=== Individual ===
Category	Player	Total
Offense
Passing	Trevor Lawrence	4,113
Rushing	Travis Etienne	1,125
Receiving	Christian Kirk	1,108
Defense
Tackles (Solo)	Foye Oluokun	128
Sacks	Josh Allen	6
Interceptions	Tyson Campbell; Andre Cisco; Rayshawn Jenkins	3

Statistics correct as of the end of the 2022 NFL season
