= Darious Williams =

American football player (born 1993)

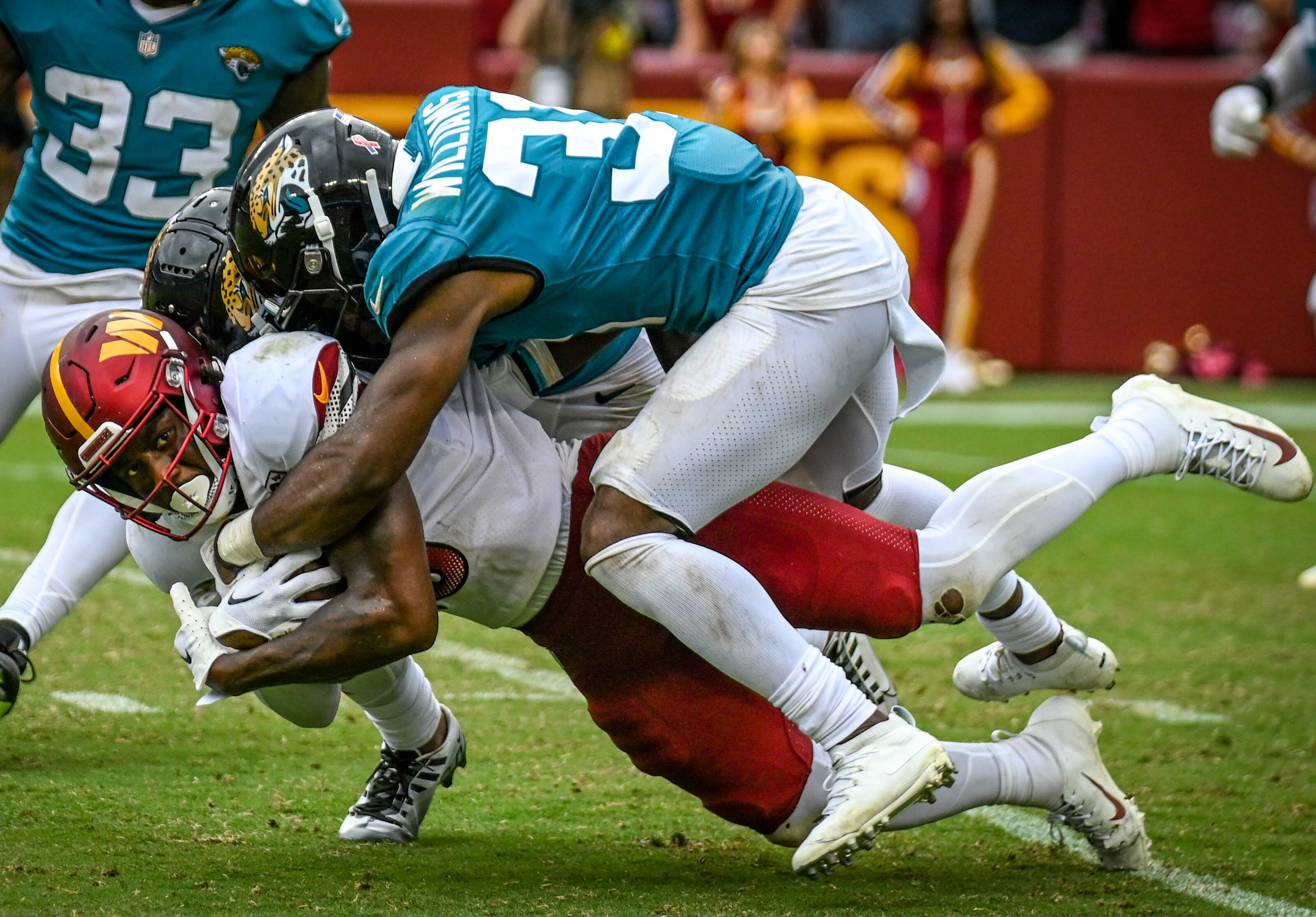
- Williams with the Jacksonville Jaguars in 2022

No. 27, 31, 11, 21, 24
- Position: Cornerback

Personal information
- Born: March 15, 1993 (age 33); Jacksonville, Florida, U.S.
- Listed height: 5 ft 9 in (1.75 m)
- Listed weight: 191 lb (87 kg)

Career information
- High school: Creekside (St. Johns, Florida)
- College: Marietta (2011); UAB (2014–2017)
- NFL draft: 2018: undrafted

Career history
- Baltimore Ravens (2018); Los Angeles Rams (2018–2021); Jacksonville Jaguars (2022–2023); Los Angeles Rams (2024–2025)

Awards and highlights
- Super Bowl champion (LVI); First team All-Conference USA (2017)

Career NFL statistics
- Total tackles: 306
- Forced fumbles: 2
- Fumble recoveries: 2
- Pass deflections: 77
- Interceptions: 12
- Defensive touchdowns: 2
- Stats at Pro Football Reference

Darious Williams (born March 15, 1993) is an American former professional football player who was a cornerback for eight seasons in the National Football League (NFL). He played college football for the Marietta Pioneers and UAB Blazers. After signing as an undrafted free agent with the Baltimore Ravens, Williams went on to join the Los Angeles Rams, where he won a championship with the team during Super Bowl LVI. He also played for the Jacksonville Jaguars.

== Early life ==
Williams was born and grew up in Jacksonville, Florida. He originally attended Bartram Trail High School before transferring to Creekside High School after his freshman year. He played basketball, football and ran track at Creekside.

== College career ==
Williams played one season at NCAA Division III Marietta College in Ohio before leaving after the season due to family issues. He then enrolled at the University of Alabama at Birmingham (UAB) for the spring semester and originally was turned down after a tryout to join the football team as a walk-on. He made the team as a walk-on in 2014 under new head coach Bill Clark and was awarded a scholarship midway through the season. After UAB dropped football after the season, Williams attended Florida State College at Jacksonville and worked as a flower delivery man until UAB brought back the program in June 2015, turning down several offers to transfer.

Over the course of two seasons with the Blazers, Williams played in 25 games (18 starts), recording 73 tackles, 26 passes defenced and 6 interceptions (two returned for a touchdown). He was named first-team All-Conference USA and named a first-team All-American by Pro Football Focus during the 2017 season after making 50 tackles with a conference leading 15 passes broken up and five interceptions (fourth in the nation).

== Professional career ==
Pre-draft measurables
Height	Weight	Arm length	Hand span	Wingspan	40-yard dash	10-yard split	20-yard split	20-yard shuttle	Three-cone drill	Vertical jump	Broad jump	Bench press
5 ft 9 5/8 in (1.77 m)	184 lb (83 kg)	30 3/4 in (0.78 m)	8 3/4 in (0.22 m)	6 ft 1 in (1.85 m)	4.44 s	1.52 s	2.56 s	4.34 s	6.85 s	39 in (0.99 m)	10 ft 2 in (3.10 m)	13 reps
All values from UAB's Pro Day

=== Baltimore Ravens ===
Williams went undrafted in the 2018 NFL draft. On May 4, 2018, the Baltimore Ravens signed Williams to a three–year, $1.71 million contract as an undrafted free agent.

Throughout training camp, Williams competed for a roster spot as a backup cornerback against Stanley Jean-Baptiste and Bennett Jackson. Head coach John Harbaugh named Williams a backup cornerback to begin the season and listed him as the seventh cornerback on the depth chart, behind Brandon Carr, Jimmy Smith, Marlon Humphrey, Anthony Averett, Maurice Canady, and Tavon Young.

He was inactive as a healthy scratch as the Ravens defeated the Buffalo Bills 47–3 in their Week 1 home-opener. On September 13, 2018, Williams made his professional regular season debut, but was limited to a single snap on special teams during a 23–34 loss at the Cincinnati Bengals. On October 6, 2018, the Ravens waived Williams in order to add Jimmy Smith to their active roster after following his return from serving his four-game suspension.

=== Los Angeles Rams (first stint) ===
==== 2018 ====
On October 8, 2018, the Los Angeles Rams claimed Williams off waivers. Upon his arrival, head coach Sean McVay named him a backup as the sixth cornerback on the depth chart, behind Marcus Peters, Sam Shields, Nickell Robey-Coleman, Troy Hill, and Dominique Hatfield. He remained on the active roster throughout the 2018 NFL season, but was inactive for ten consecutive games (Weeks 6–16) as a healthy scratch. In Week 17, he appeared in his first game with the Rams, but was limited to special teams and only had four snaps on defense as the Rams defeated the San Francisco 49ers 48–32. He did not record a stat as a rookie and only appeared in two games throughout the entire season.

==== 2019 ====
Throughout his first training camp with the Rams, Williams competed for a roster spot as a backup cornerback against Dominique Hatfield, Kevin Peterson, Donte Deayon, and Ramon Richards. Defensive coordinator Wade Phillips named Williams as a backup cornerback as he won the last roster spot as the sixth cornerback on the depth chart. He began the season on the depth chart behind Marcus Peters, Aqib Talib, Nickell Robey-Coleman, Troy Hill, and David Long.

He was inactive as a healthy scratch as the Rams defeated the New Orleans Saints 27–9 in Week 2. In Week 3, Williams made his first career tackle on returner Damion Ratley while covering a punt during a 20–13 win at the Cleveland Browns. On October 20, 2019, Williams earned his first career start and made two solo tackles, while also returning a fumble recovery for his first career touchdown during a 37–10 win at the Atlanta Falcons. His touchdown occurred after he recovered a fumble while covering a punt return, after Troy Reeder forced a fumble by punt returner Russell Gage that was recovered in the endzone by Williams for a touchdown at the end of the fourth quarter. He was inactive for three games (Weeks 11–13) due to an ankle injury. In Week 15, Williams collected a season-high five combined tackles (four solo) during a 21–44 loss at the Dallas Cowboys. On December 21, 2019, Williams made two solo tackles, two pass deflections, and had his first career interception after a pass by Jimmy Garoppolo to wide receiver Emmanuel Sanders was deflected by Jalen Ramsey as the Rams lost 31–34 at the San Francisco 49ers. The following week, he made three solo tackles, tied his season-high of two pass deflections, and intercepted a pass thrown by Kyler Murray to Larry Fitzgerald during a 31–24 win against the Arizona Cardinals. He finished the 2019 NFL season with 15 combined tackles (14 solo), four passes defended, two interceptions, and a fumble recovery for a touchdown in 14 games and three starts. Pro Football Focus had Williams finished the season with an overall grade of 81.9.

==== 2020 ====
On January 16, 2020, the Rams hired former Denver Broncos' linebackers coach Brandon Staley as their new defensive coordinator, following the retirement of Wade Phillips. Throughout training camp, he competed to be a starting cornerback against Troy Hill, David Long, Nickell Robey-Coleman, and Adonis Alexander. Head coach Sean McVay named Williams a backup cornerback to begin the season and placed him third on the depth chart behind starters Jalen Ramsey and Troy Hill.

In Week 4, Williams recorded five combined tackles (four solo), two pass deflections, and secured the victory after intercepting a pass by Daniel Jones to wide receiver Damion Ratley at the end of the fourth quarter to secure a 17–9 victory against the New York Giants. On November 15, 2020, Williams had one solo tackle, a season-high three pass deflections, and a career-high two interceptions off passes thrown by Russell Wilson during a 23–16 victory against the Seattle Seahawks. In Week 16, he collected a season-high six combined tackles (four solo) and broke up a pass as the Rams lost 9–20 at the Seattle Seahawks. He finished the season with 44 combined tackles (37 solo), 13 pass deflections, and four interceptions in 16 games and 10 starts. He earned an overall grade of 81.5 from Pro Football Focus in 2020.

The Los Angeles Rams finished the 2020 NFL season second in the NFC West with a 10–6 record, clinching a playoff berth. On January 9, 2021, Williams started in his first career playoff game and made four combined tackles (three solo), made a pass deflection, and returned an interception on a pass thrown by Russell Wilson to wide receiver D. K. Metcalf for a 42-yard touchdown during a 30–20 win at the Seattle Seahawks in the NFC Wild-Card Game. The following week, he made three solo tackles and two pass deflections as the Rams were eliminated from the playoffs after a 18–32 loss at the Green Bay Packers in the Divisional Round.

==== 2021 ====
On January 21, 2021, the Rams announced their decision to hire Atlanta Falcons' defensive coordinator Raheem Morris as their defensive coordinator after Brandon Stanley became the head coach of the Los Angeles Chargers.

On March 15, 2021, the Rams placed a first-round restricted free agent tender on Williams. On April 21, 2021, Williams officially signed his restricted free agent tender, agreeing to a one–year, $4.76 million contract. During training camp, he competed against David Long to be the No. 2 starting cornerback following the departure of Troy Hill. Head coach Sean McVay named Williams and Jalen Ramsey the starting cornerbacks to begin the season.

On October 7, 2021, Williams recorded four combined tackles (three solo) before exiting in the fourth quarter of a 26–17 win at the Seattle Seahawks after suffering and injury after an accidental collision with teammate Taylor Rapp. On October 12, 2021, the Rams officially placed him on injured reserve due to an ankle injury. On November 6, 2021, the Rams added him back to the active roster after he was inactive for three games (Weeks 6–8). In Week 12, he collected a season-high seven solo tackles and made a pass deflection during a 28–36 loss at the Green Bay Packers. On December 13, 2021, Williams made six solo tackles and a season-high three pass deflections during a 30–23 victory at the Arizona Cardinals. He finished the season with a total of 71 combined tackles (60 solo) and nine pass deflections in 14 games and 13 starts. He received an overall grade of 59.0 from Pro Football Focus in 2021.

The Los Angeles Rams finished the 2021 NFL season a top the NFC West with a 12–5 record to clinch a playoff berth. The Rams defeated the Arizona Cardinals 34–11 in the NFC Wild-card Game and won 30–27 in the Divisional Round at the Tampa Bay Buccaneers. On January 30, 2022, he started in the NFC Championship Game and made four combined tackles (two solo) and a pass deflection as the Rams defeated the San Francisco 49ers 20–17 to advance to the Super Bowl. On February 13, 2022, Williams started in Super Bowl LVI and recorded eight combined tackles (three solo) and had one pass deflection as the Rams defeated the Cincinnati Bengals 23–20. Williams earned the first Super Bowl ring of his career.

=== Jacksonville Jaguars ===
==== 2022 ====
On March 16, 2022, the Jacksonville Jaguars signed Williams to a three–year, $30.00 million contract that also included $18.00 million guaranteed and a signing bonus of $1.50 million. He entered training camp slated as the starting nickelback under defensive coordinator Mike Caldwell. Head coach Doug Pederson named him the starting nickelback and listed him as the third cornerback on the depth chart to begin the season, behind starters Tyson Campbell and Shaquill Griffin.

Williams was named the No. 2 starting cornerback heading into Week 7 after Shaquill Griffin suffered a back injury and was subsequently placed on injured reserve for the remainder of the season. On October 23, 2022, Williams made eight combined tackles (five solo) and a season-high three pass deflections during a 17–23 loss at the New York Giants. On Week 18, he collected a season-high eight combined tackles (six solo) and broke up a pass as the Jaguars defeated the Tennessee Titans 20–16. He finished the season with 53 combined tackles (35 solo) and 16 pass deflections in 17 games and 12 starts.

==== 2023 ====
Head coach Doug Pederson retained Williams and Tyson Campbell as the starting cornerbacks to begin the season. On October 1, 2023, Williams made five combined tackles (four solo), a season-high three pass deflections, and returned an interception thrown by Desmond Ridder to wide receiver Drake London for a 61-yard touchdown as the Jaguars defeated the Atlanta Falcons 23–7. The following week, he collected a season-high seven solo tackles, made a pass deflection, and intercepted a pass thrown by Josh Allen to wide receiver Stefon Diggs during a 25–20 win at the Buffalo Bills in Week 5. In Week 6, he made three solo tackles, two pass deflections, and had his third consecutive game with an interception after picking off a pass by Gardner Minshew to wide receiver Michael Pittman during a 37–20 victory against the Indianapolis Colts. On December 10, 2023, he recorded two solo tackles, tied his season-high of three pass deflections, and tied his career with his fourth interception of the season after intercepting a pass by Joe Flacco to wide receiver Cedric Tillman during a 27–31 loss at the Cleveland Browns. He started all 17 games during the 2023 NFL season for the first time in his career and had a total of 53 combined tackles (44 solo), a career-high 19 pass deflections, four interceptions, two forced fumbles, and one touchdown. He received an overall grade of 79.5 from Pro Football Focus and a coverage grade of 85.3. On March 5, 2024, Williams was released by the Jaguars.

=== Los Angeles Rams (second stint) ===
==== 2024 ====
On March 13, 2024, the Los Angeles Rams signed Williams to a three–year, $22.5 million contract that includes $7 million guaranteed upon signing and an initial signing bonus of $3.5 million.

He missed the majority of training camp after injuring his hamstring. On September 5, 2024, the Rams placed him on injured reserve due to his injured hamstring. On October 5, 2024, the Rams removed Williams from injured reserve and added him to their active roster after he was sidelined for the first four games (Weeks 1–4) of the season. Head coach Sean McVay named Williams a starting cornerback upon his return and paired him with Cobie Durant.

In Week 14, he collected a season-high six combined tackles (five solo) as the Rams defeated the Buffalo Bills 44–42. On December 12, 2024, Williams made two combined tackles (one solo), a pass deflection, and had his only interception of the season on a pass attempt by Brock Purdy to wide receiver Jauan Jennings at the end of the fourth quarter to help secure a 12–6 victory at the San Francisco 49ers. He was inactive as a healthy scratch during a 25–30 loss to the Seattle Seahawks in Week 18 after head coach Sean McVay opted to rest his starters in preparation for the playoffs. He finished the season with 45 combined tackles (31 solo), seven pass deflections, and one interception in 12 games and 11 starts. He received an overall grade of 60.0 from Pro Football Focus in 2024.

==== 2025 ====
Williams played in 12 games for the Rams including three starts. During the regular season, he had 25 total tackles (18 solo) along with one interception which he returned 18 yards in the Rams' 21-19 victory over the Seattle Seahawks in Week 11. Williams was inactive for the final two games of the regular season and the Wild Card Round, but played in L.A.'s final two playoff games, contributing four tackles in each game, including the Rams' 31-27 loss to Seattle in the NFC Championship Game, which marked Williams' final career start.

On March 7, 2026, Williams announced his retirement from professional football, and was placed on the Rams' reserve/retired list.

== NFL career statistics ==
Legend
	Won the Super Bowl
	Led the league
**Bold**	Career high

=== Regular season ===
Year	Team	Games		Tackles					Interceptions						Fumbles				
Year	Team	GP	GS	Cmb	Solo	Ast	Sck	TFL	Int	Yds	Avg	Lng	TD	PD	FF	Fum	FR	Yds	TD
2018	BAL	3	0	0	0	0	0.0	0	0	0	0.0	0	0	0	0	0	0	0	0
2018	LAR	1	0	0	0	0	0.0	0	0	0	0.0	0	0	0	0	0	0	0	0
2019	LAR	12	3	15	14	1	0.0	1	2	0	0.0	0	0	4	0	0	**1**	0	**1**
2020	LAR	16	10	44	37	7	0.0	1	**4**	21	5.3	19	0	14	0	0	0	0	0
2021	LAR	14	13	**71**	**60**	11	0.0	**3**	0	0	0.0	0	0	9	0	0	**1**	0	0
2022	JAX	**17**	12	53	35	**18**	0.0	2	0	0	0.0	0	0	16	0	0	0	0	0
2023	JAX	**17**	**17**	53	44	9	0.0	**3**	**4**	**72**	**18.0**	**61**	**1**	**19**	**2**	0	0	0	0
2024	LAR	12	11	45	31	14	0.0	1	1	0	0.0	0	0	7	0	0	0	0	0
2025	LAR	12	3	25	18	7	0.0	1	1	18	**18.0**	18	0	8	0	0	0	0	0
Career		104	69	306	239	67	0.0	12	12	111	9.3	61	1	77	2	0	2	0	1

=== Postseason ===
Year	Team	Games		Tackles					Interceptions						Fumbles				
Year	Team	GP	GS	Cmb	Solo	Ast	Sck	TFL	Int	Yds	Avg	Lng	TD	PD	FF	Fum	FR	Yds	TD
2020	LAR	2	1	7	6	1	0.0	0	**1**	**42**	**42.0**	**42**	**1**	2	0	0	0	0	0
2021	LAR	**4**	**4**	**24**	**13**	**11**	0.0	**1**	0	0	0.0	0	0	**3**	0	0	0	0	0
2022	JAX	2	1	6	2	4	0.0	0	0	0	0.0	0	0	1	0	0	0	0	0
2024	LAR	2	2	6	3	3	0.0	**1**	0	0	0.0	0	0	2	0	0	0	0	0
2025	LAR	2	1	8	6	2	0.0	0	0	0	0.0	0	0	0	0	0	0	0	0
Career		12	9	51	30	21	0.0	2	1	42	42.0	42	1	8	0	0	0	0	0
