= Evan Engram =

American football player (born 1994)

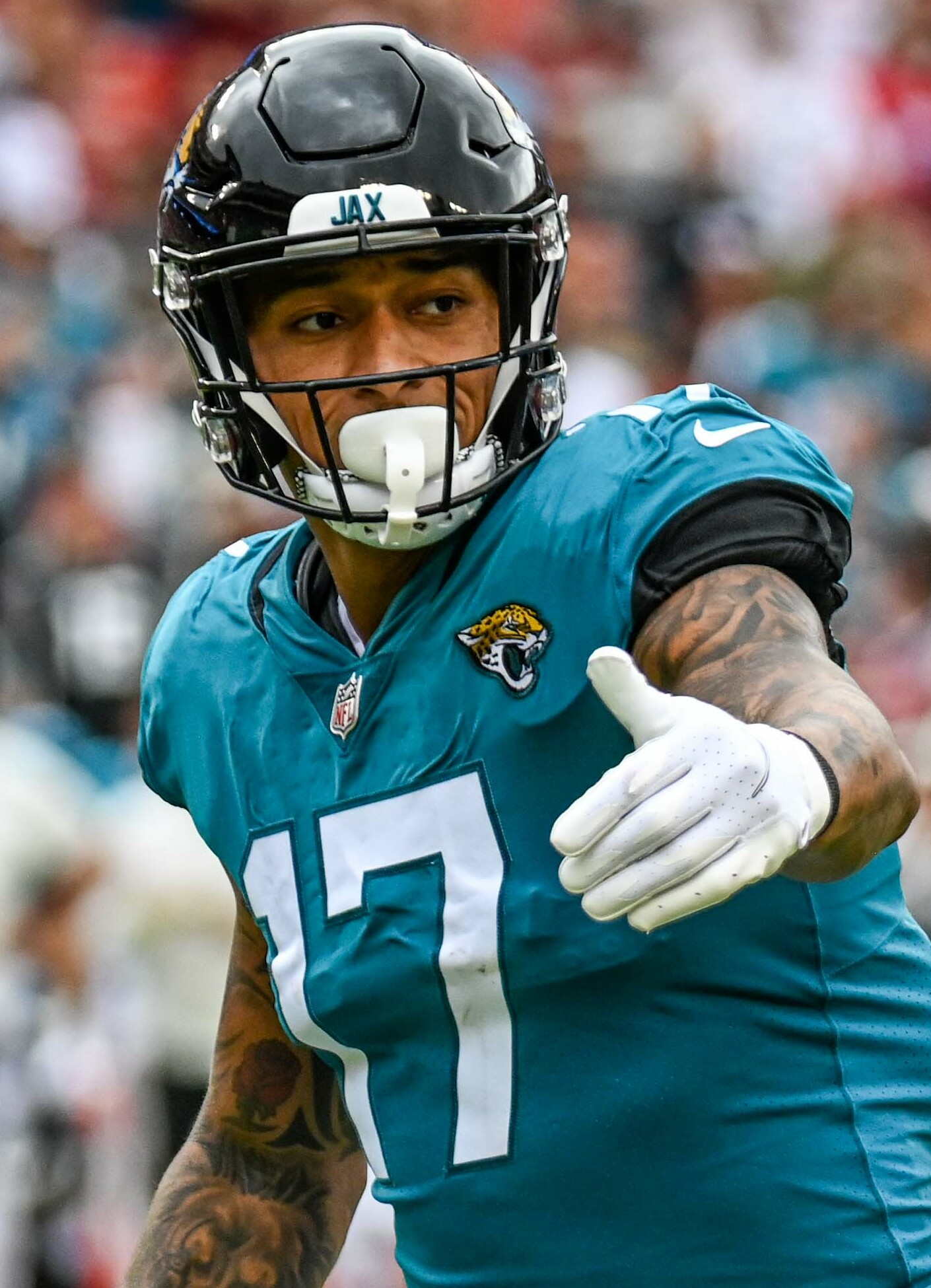
- Engram with the Jacksonville Jaguars in 2022

No. 1 – Denver Broncos
- Position: Tight end
- Roster status: Active

Personal information
- Born: September 2, 1994 (age 32); Powder Springs, Georgia, U.S.
- Listed height: 6 ft 3 in (1.91 m)
- Listed weight: 240 lb (109 kg)

Career information
- High school: Hillgrove (Powder Springs)
- College: Ole Miss (2013–2016)
- NFL draft: 2017: 1st round, 23rd overall pick

Career history
- New York Giants (2017–2021); Jacksonville Jaguars (2022–2024); Denver Broncos (2025–present)

Awards and highlights
- 2× Pro Bowl (2020, 2023); PFWA All-Rookie Team (2017); Ozzie Newsome Award (2016); First-team All-American (2016); Conerly Trophy (2016); 2× First-team All-SEC (2014, 2016); Second-team All-SEC (2015)

Career NFL statistics as of 2025
- Receptions: 546
- Receiving yards: 5,383
- Receiving touchdowns: 26
- Stats at Pro Football Reference

Evan Michael Engram (born September 2, 1994) is an American professional football tight end for the Denver Broncos of the National Football League (NFL). He played college football for the Ole Miss Rebels, earning first-team All-American honors in 2016. He was selected by the New York Giants with the 23rd pick in the first round of the 2017 NFL draft. In 2022, Engram signed with the Jacksonville Jaguars, where he spent three seasons before being released after the 2024 season and later signed with the Broncos. He has been known for his incredibly fast 40-yard dash, a 4.42.

== Early life ==
Engram was born on September 2, 1994 in Powder Springs, Georgia. He attended and played high school football at Hillgrove High School in Powder Springs, Georgia. A 3–star tight end recruit, Engram committed to play college football at Ole Miss over offers from Georgia State, Marshall, South Alabama, Toledo, and Wake Forest, among others.

== College career ==
Engram was a consensus first-team All-Southeastern Conference selection. In his four-year career at Ole Miss, he made 162 receptions for 2,320 yards, a 14.3 yard average. He had 15 career touchdowns. He netted five catches for 176 yards, including an 83-yard reception, in the 2014 Egg Bowl. In his last year at Ole Miss, on 65 receptions, Engram netted 926 yards and eight touchdowns, a performance that earned him the Conerly Trophy.

== Professional career ==
=== Pre-draft ===
Engram received an invitation to the Senior Bowl and practiced well during the week. He helped the South defeat the North 16–15 and made one catch for ten yards. He attended the NFL Scouting Combine and completed all the required combine drills. On April 3, 2017, he participated in Ole Miss's pro day and chose to only perform positional drills and stand on his combine performance. NFL draft experts and analysts projected him to be a first or second round pick in the draft. He was ranked the second best tight end in the draft by Sports Illustrated and was ranked the third best tight end prospect by ESPN, NFLDraftScout.com, Mike Mayock, and Bucky Brooks.

Pre-draft measurables
| Height | Weight | Arm length | Hand span | Wingspan | 40-yard dash | 10-yard split | 20-yard split | 20-yard shuttle | Three-cone drill | Vertical jump | Broad jump | Bench press | Wonderlic |
|---|---|---|---|---|---|---|---|---|---|---|---|---|---|
| 6 ft 3 3/8 in (1.91 m) | 234 lb (106 kg) | 33 1/2 in (0.85 m) | 10 in (0.25 m) | 6 ft 6 5/8 in (2.00 m) | 4.42 s | 1.52 s | 2.57 s | 4.23 s | 6.92 s | 36.0 in (0.91 m) | 10 ft 5 in (3.18 m) | 19 reps | 26 |
All values from NFL Combine

=== New York Giants ===
==== 2017 ====
The New York Giants selected Engram in the first round (23rd overall) of the 2017 NFL draft. He was the second tight end to be selected in the draft, after O. J. Howard was selected 19th overall by the Tampa Bay Buccaneers. Engram was selected to upgrade a Giants tight end core that only had three touchdown receptions the previous year. On June 15, 2017, the Giants signed Engram to a four-year, $10.71 million contract that included a signing bonus of $5.93 million and was fully guaranteed.

Throughout training camp, he was slated to take the vacant starting tight end role that used to belong to Larry Donnell. Head coach Ben McAdoo officially named him the starting tight end to start the 2017 regular season.

He made his professional regular season debut and first career start in the Giants' season-opener against the Dallas Cowboys and made four receptions for 44 yards in their 19–3 loss. His first career reception came on a three-yard pass by Eli Manning on the first pass of the game in the first quarter before being tackled by Cowboys' linebacker Sean Lee. On September 18, 2017, Engram caught four passes for 49 yards and a touchdown in a 24–10 loss to the Detroit Lions on Monday Night Football. His first career touchdown reception came in the second quarter on an 18-yard pass from Eli Manning. On December 3, 2017, Engram caught seven passes for a season-high 99 receiving yards and a touchdown during a 24–17 loss at the Oakland Raiders. This marked his sixth and last touchdown of the season. Head coach Ben McAdoo was fired after the game due to the Giants posting a 2–10 record. In Week 15, he made a season-high eight receptions for 87 yards and had his first carry of his career for a 14-yard gain as the Giants lost 34–29 to the Philadelphia Eagles. He was inactive for the Giants' 18–10 victory over the Washington Redskins in Week 17 after he suffered a rib injury the previous week. He finished the season with 64 receptions for 722 receiving yards and six touchdowns in 11 starts and 15 games. He was named to the PFWA All-Rookie Team.

==== 2018 ====
In his second professional season, Engram finished with 45 receptions for 577 receiving yards and three receiving touchdowns in 11 games. He missed some time due to a MCL injury and foot injury.

==== 2019 ====
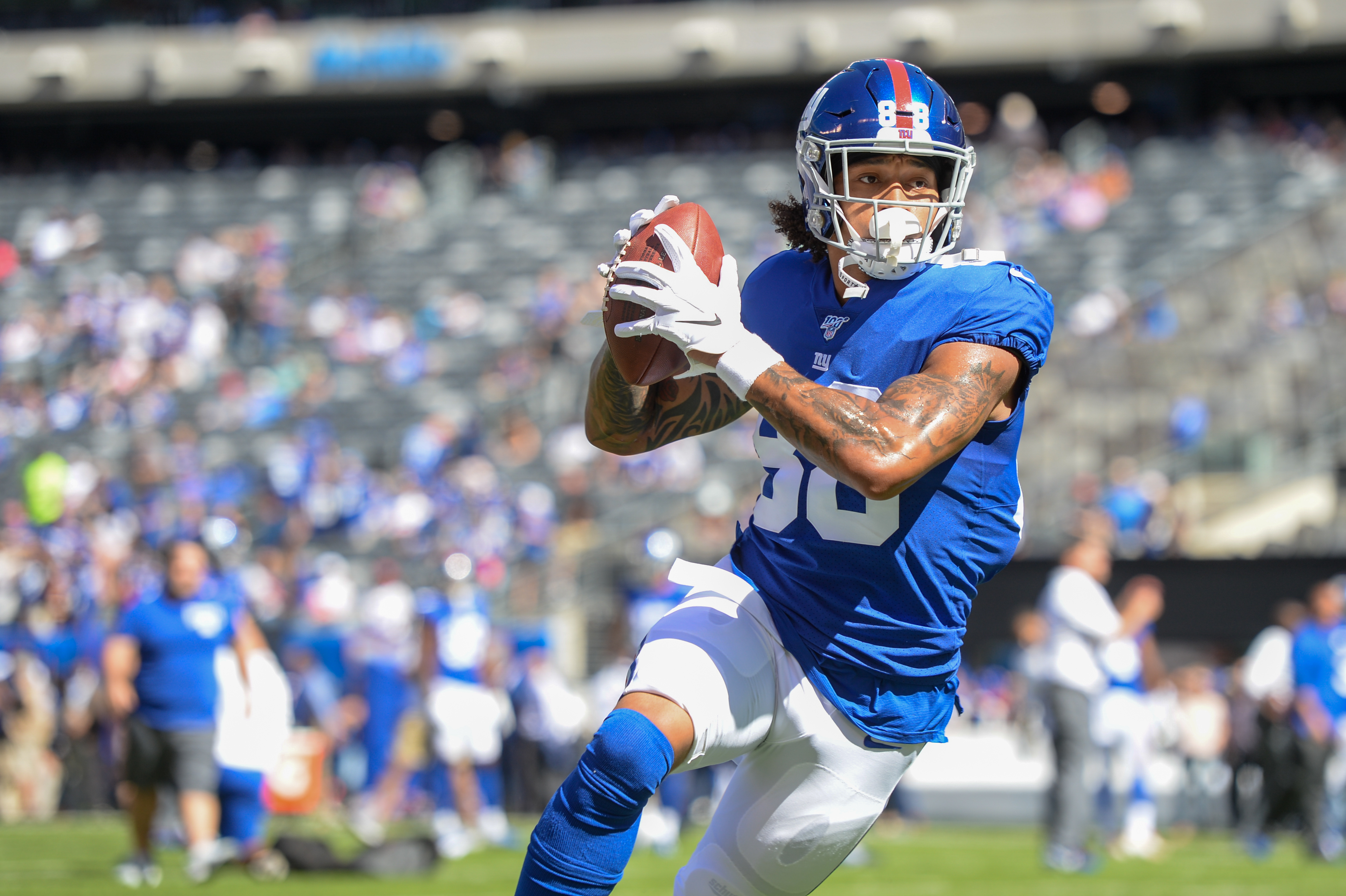
Engram playing for the New York Giants in 2019.

Engram recorded his first career 100-yard game in a Week 1 35–17 loss to the Cowboys with 11 receptions, 116 yards, and a touchdown. In Week 3 against the Tampa Bay Buccaneers, Engram caught six passes for 113 yards and a 75-yard touchdown as the Giants won 32–31, catching the first career NFL touchdown from rookie Daniel Jones. On December 17, Engram was placed on injured reserve with a foot injury after missing the last five games. He finished the season with 44 catches for 467 yards and three touchdowns through eight games.

==== 2020 ====
On April 29, 2020, the Giants picked up the fifth-year option on Engram's contract., worth $6.013 million fully guaranteed for the 2021 season.

On October 22, 2020, against the Eagles, Engram dropped a critical pass from Daniel Jones on third-and-six at the Eagles 25 yard line ahead of the two-minute warning in the fourth quarter. This forced the Giants to punt and lose 22-21 despite the Giants leading 21–16 at the time of Engram's drop. In Week 12 against the Cincinnati Bengals, he had six receptions for 129 receiving yards in the 19–17 victory.

Despite being named to his first career Pro Bowl with 63 receptions for 654 yards and a touchdown, Engram struggled during the season with eleven drops which led to three turnovers and cost the Giants a pair of touchdowns.

==== 2021 ====
After missing the first two games of the season due to a calf injury, Engram struggled in 2021, and finished the season with 46 receptions for 408 yards and scored three touchdowns in 15 games. Towards the end of the season, he was utilized more as a blocking tight end than a receiver.

=== Jacksonville Jaguars ===
==== 2022 ====
On March 16, 2022, Engram signed a one-year, $9 million contract with the Jacksonville Jaguars. In Week 8, Engram scored his first touchdown as a Jacksonville Jaguar in a 21–17 loss to the Denver Broncos. In a 36–22 win in Week 14 against the Tennessee Titans, Engram caught a career-high 162 yards on eleven catches with two of those catches going for touchdowns. In Week 16 against the New York Jets, he had seven receptions for 113 receiving yards in the 19–3 victory. He finished the 2022 season with 73 receptions for 766 receiving yards and four receiving touchdowns.

In the Wild Card Round of the playoffs, Engram recorded seven receptions for 93 receiving yards and one receiving touchdown in the 31–30 victory over the Los Angeles Chargers.

==== 2023 ====
On March 6, 2023, the Jaguars placed the franchise tag on Engram. On July 16, the Jaguars signed Engram to a three-year, $41.25 million deal. The new contract included $24 million in guaranteed money.

Engram finished the season with 114 receptions for 963 receiving yards and four receiving touchdowns. He became the eighth tight end in NFL history to record over 100 receptions in a season in the Super Bowl era, and was named to the 2024 Pro Bowl Games as an alternate.

==== 2024 ====
Engram suffered a hamstring injury in Jacksonville's Week 1 matchup against the Miami Dolphins and did not play in Weeks 2-5. He returned in Week 6 and led the team with 10 receptions for 102 yards in the matchup against the Chicago Bears. In the Jaguars' Week 13 contest against the Houston Texans, Jaguars quarterback Trevor Lawrence was knocked out of the game by a late hit from Texans linebacker Azeez Al-Shaair. Engram pushed Al-Shaair to the ground after witnessing the hit, sparking a fight between Al-Shaair and several Jaguars players. Engram was fined $11,255 for his actions. Engram was ruled out for the season on December 13, 2024, after suffering a torn labrum during Jacksonville's Week 14 game against the Tennessee Titans. He finished the campaign with 47 receptions for 365 yards and one touchdown in nine games played.

On March 6, 2025, the Jaguars released Engram.

=== Denver Broncos ===
On March 13, 2025, Engram signed a two-year, $23 million deal with the Denver Broncos. Prior to the signing, Engram visited with the Broncos and the Los Angeles Chargers. He received similar offers from both teams, but ultimately chose the Broncos. After officially signing with the Broncos, Engram chose #1 as his jersey number (which was now allowed following the 2021 NFL numbering rule revisions), becoming the first tight end to wear the number in the NFL since before the 1973 season. He finished the 2025 season with 50 receptions for 461 yards and one touchdown, which came in Week 5 against the Eagles.

== Career statistics ==
=== NFL ===
Legend
| **Bold** | Career high |

==== Regular season ====
| Year | Team | Games | | Receiving | | | | | Rushing | | | | | Fumbles | |
| Year | Team | GP | GS | Rec | Yds | Avg | Lng | TD | Att | Yds | Avg | Lng | TD | Fum | Lost |
|---|---|---|---|---|---|---|---|---|---|---|---|---|---|---|---|
| 2017 | NYG | 15 | 11 | 64 | 722 | 11.3 | 35 | **6** | 1 | 14 | **14.0** | **14** | 0 | 0 | – |
| 2018 | NYG | 11 | 8 | 45 | 577 | **12.8** | 54 | 3 | 3 | **36** | 12.0 | **14** | 0 | 0 | – |
| 2019 | NYG | 8 | 6 | 44 | 467 | 10.6 | **75** | 3 | 3 | 7 | 2.3 | 5 | 0 | 0 | – |
| 2020 | NYG | 16 | 14 | 63 | 654 | 10.4 | 53 | 1 | **6** | 26 | 4.3 | 9 | **1** | 1 | 1 |
| 2021 | NYG | 15 | 12 | 46 | 408 | 8.9 | 30 | 3 | 1 | -3 | -3.0 | -3 | 0 | 1 | 1 |
| 2022 | JAX | 17 | 14 | 73 | 766 | 10.5 | 36 | 4 | 2 | 13 | 6.5 | 13 | 0 | 0 | – |
| 2023 | JAX | 17 | **15** | **114** | **963** | 8.4 | 34 | 4 | 0 | – | – | – | – | **3** | **2** |
| 2024 | JAX | 9 | 9 | 47 | 365 | 7.8 | 24 | 1 | 0 | – | – | – | – | 1 | 1 |
| 2025 | DEN | 16 | 2 | 50 | 461 | 9.2 | 41 | 1 | 1 | 7 | 7.0 | 7 | 0 | 0 | – |
| Career | | 124 | 91 | 546 | 5,383 | 9.9 | 75 | 26 | 17 | 100 | 5.9 | 14 | 1 | 6 | 5 |

==== Postseason ====
| Year | Team | Games | | Receiving | | | | | Fumbles | |
| Year | Team | GP | GS | Rec | Yds | Avg | Lng | TD | Fum | Lost |
|---|---|---|---|---|---|---|---|---|---|---|
| 2022 | JAX | 2 | 2 | 12 | 124 | 10.3 | 24 | 1 | 0 | – |
| 2025 | DEN | 2 | 0 | 3 | 26 | 8.7 | 12 | 0 | 0 | – |
| Career | | 4 | 2 | 15 | 150 | 10.0 | 24 | 1 | 0 | 0 |

=== College ===
| Season | Team | GP | Receiving | | | |
| Season | Team | GP | Rec | Yds | Avg | TD |
|---|---|---|---|---|---|---|
| 2013 | Ole Miss | 8 | 21 | 268 | 12.8 | 3 |
| 2014 | Ole Miss | 10 | 38 | 662 | 17.4 | 2 |
| 2015 | Ole Miss | 12 | 38 | 464 | 12.2 | 2 |
| 2016 | Ole Miss | 11 | 65 | 926 | 14.2 | 8 |
| Total | | 41 | 162 | 2,320 | 14.3 | 15 |

== Career highlights ==
=== Awards and honors ===
NFL

- 2× Pro Bowl (2020, 2023)
- PFWA All-Rookie Team (2017)

College

- Ozzie Newsome Award (2016)
- First-team All-American (2016)
- Conerly Trophy (2016)
- 2× First-team All-SEC (2014, 2016)
- Second-team All-SEC (2015)

=== Records ===
New York Giants franchise records

- Most touchdowns in a season by a rookie tight end (6)

Jacksonville Jaguars franchise records

- Most receptions in a season by a tight end (114)
- Most receiving yards in a season by a tight end (963)

== Personal life ==
Engram's sister, Mackenzie Engram, played for the University of Georgia Lady Bulldogs basketball team.
