= East Hamilton High School =

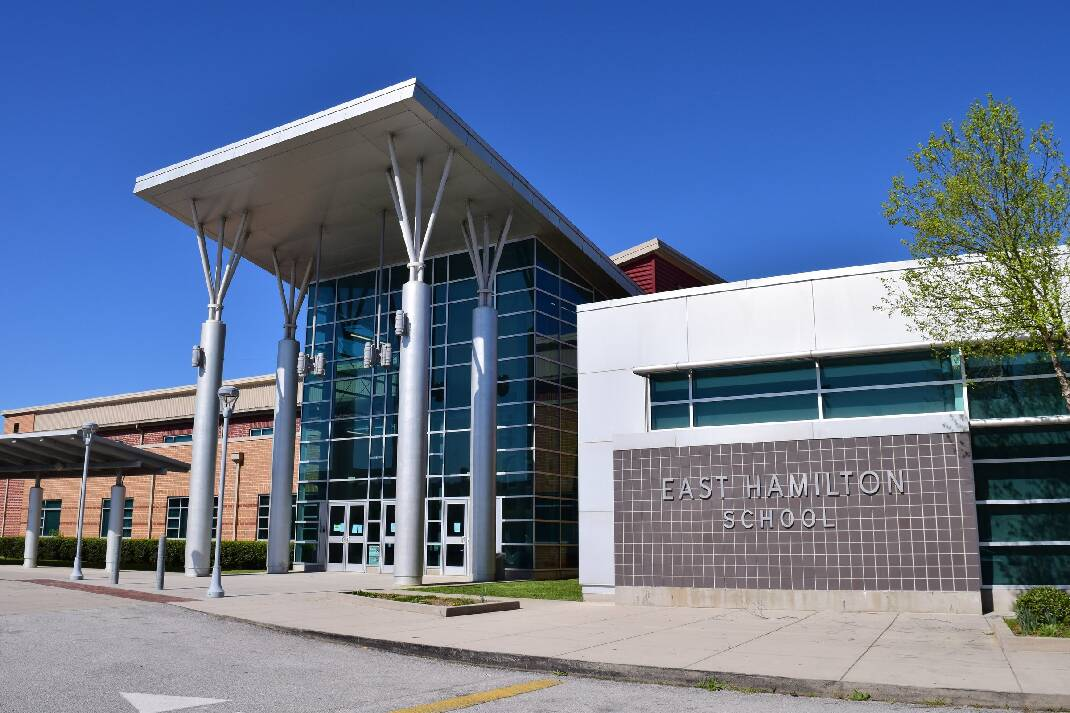

Location
- 2015 Ooltewah Ringgold Rd, Ooltewah, TN 37363; United States; 35.0063972°N 85.0961914°W

Information
- Type: Public
- Motto: Committed to Excellence
- Established: 2009
- School district: Hamilton County Schools
- Principal: Brent Eller
- Staff: 66.58
- Faculty: 19.00 (FTE)
- Grades: 9–12
- Enrollment: 1,263 (2023–2024)
- Campus type: Suburban
- Colors: Green and black
- Mascot: Otis the Ibis
- Nickname: The Hurricanes
- Feeder schools: East Hamilton Middle School
- Website: ehhs.hcde.org

East Hamilton High School is a public school high school located in Ooltewah, Tennessee. Established and opened in 2009, it was originally a "middle high school" that enrolled students from grades 6–12. In December 2020, the new East Hamilton Middle School opened and East Hamilton Middle High School became just East Hamilton High School. Students in grades 6-8 now attend the new East Hamilton Middle School, and students in grades 9-12 attend East Hamilton High School. Currently, the principal of East Hamilton High School is Brent Eller.
