= Tre Herndon =

American football player (born 1996)

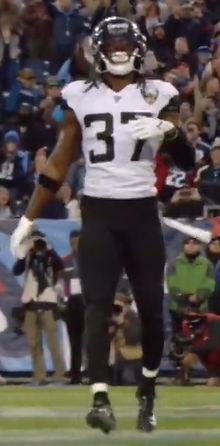
- Herndon with the Jacksonville Jaguars in 2019

Profile
- Position: Cornerback

Personal information
- Born: March 5, 1996 (age 30); Detroit, Michigan, U.S.
- Listed height: 5 ft 11 in (1.80 m)
- Listed weight: 185 lb (84 kg)

Career information
- High school: East Hamilton (Ooltewah, Tennessee)
- College: Vanderbilt (2014–2017)
- NFL draft: 2018: undrafted

Career history
- Jacksonville Jaguars (2018–2023); New York Giants (2024)*; New Orleans Saints (2024)*; Indianapolis Colts (2025)*; Buffalo Bills (2025)*
- * Offseason or practice squad member only

Career NFL statistics as of 2025
- Total tackles: 243
- Sacks: 1
- Forced fumbles: 2
- Fumble recoveries: 1
- Pass deflections: 32
- Interceptions: 3
- Stats at Pro Football Reference

Willie "Tre" Herndon III (born March 5, 1996) is an American professional football cornerback who is currently a free agent. He entered the National Football League as an undrafted free agent, signing with the Jacksonville Jaguars in 2018. He has also played for the Buffalo Bills, Indianapolis Colts, New York Giants, and New Orleans Saints. He played college football for the Vanderbilt Commodores.

== Early life ==
Herndon attended East Hamilton High School in Ooltewah, Tennessee, a suburb of Chattanooga. A 3-star recruit, he committed to Vanderbilt University to play college football in 2013.

== College career ==
Herndon played at Vanderbilt from 2014 to 2017. After his senior season in 2017, he entered the 2018 NFL draft. During his career he had 122 tackles (2.5 for loss), two interceptions, 20 pass break-ups, and one forced fumble.

== Professional career ==
Pre-draft measurables
Height	Weight	Arm length	Hand span	40-yard dash	10-yard split	20-yard split	20-yard shuttle	Three-cone drill	Vertical jump	Broad jump	Bench press
5 ft 11 3/4 in (1.82 m)	186 lb (84 kg)	30 7/8 in (0.78 m)	8 7/8 in (0.23 m)	4.47 s	1.59 s	2.67 s	4.12 s	6.82 s	34.5 in (0.88 m)	10 ft 6 in (3.20 m)	12 reps
All values from Vanderbilt's Pro Day

=== Jacksonville Jaguars ===
On April 30, 2018, the Jacksonville Jaguars signed Herndon to a three-year, $1.71 million contract that includes $17,700 guaranteed and a signing bonus of $5,000.

Herndon entered training camp and competed for a roster spot as a backup cornerback against Dee Delaney, Dexter McDougle, Quenton Meeks, Jalen Myrick, and Sammy Seamster. Herndon earned the fifth and final cornerback spot on the roster after beating out Jalen Myrick. Head coach Doug Marrone named Herndon the fifth backup cornerback behind Jalen Ramsey, A. J. Bouye, D. J. Hayden, and Tyler Patmon.

After the Jaguars traded their starting cornerback Jalen Ramsey to the Los Angeles Rams in 2019, Herndon was promoted to starting corner. He had previously been starting while Ramsey had been out with a supposed back injury. In Week 8 against the New York Jets, Herndon intercepted quarterback Sam Darnold twice in the 29–15 win.

In Week 9 of the 2020 season against the Houston Texans, Herndon recorded his first career sack on Deshaun Watson during the 27–25 loss. He was placed on the reserve/COVID-19 list by the team on December 16, 2020, and activated three days later.

Herndon signed a contract extension with the Jaguars on March 12, 2021.

On March 17, 2022, Herndon re-signed with the Jaguars.

On March 18, 2023, Herndon re-signed with the Jaguars.

=== New York Giants ===
On June 12, 2024, Herndon signed with the New York Giants. He was released on August 27.

=== New Orleans Saints ===
On October 29, 2024, Herndon was signed to the New Orleans Saints' practice squad.

=== Indianapolis Colts ===
On July 31, 2025, Herndon signed with the Indianapolis Colts. He was released by the Colts on August 9.

=== Buffalo Bills ===
On August 12, 2025, Herndon signed with the Buffalo Bills. He was released by the Bills on August 24.

== Personal life ==
His parents, Willie Herndon, Jr. and Sabrina Herndon, work at Unum. He has a sister. He majored in Sociology. He was the first football player from East Hamilton High School to receive a scholarship from a Southeastern Conference school. Herndon is a practicing Muslim.
