= Mike Caldwell (linebacker) =

American football player and coach (born 1971)

Tampa Bay Buccaneers
- Title: Linebackers coach

Personal information
- Born: August 31, 1971 (age 55); Oak Ridge, Tennessee, U.S.
- Listed height: 6 ft 2 in (1.88 m)
- Listed weight: 235 lb (107 kg)

Career information
- Position: Linebacker (No. 56, 52, 55, 59)
- High school: Oak Ridge
- College: Middle Tennessee State
- NFL draft: 1993: 3rd round, 83rd overall pick

Career history

Playing
- Cleveland Browns (1993–1995); Baltimore Ravens (1996); Arizona Cardinals (1997); Philadelphia Eagles (1998–2001); Chicago Bears (2002); Carolina Panthers (2003)

Coaching
- Philadelphia Eagles (2008–2012); Defensive quality control coach (2008-2009); Assistant linebackers coach (2010); Linebackers coach (2011-2013); Arizona Cardinals (2013–2014) Inside linebackers coach; New York Jets (2015–2018) Assistant head coach & inside linebackers coach; Tampa Bay Buccaneers (2019–2021) Inside linebackers coach; Jacksonville Jaguars (2022–2023) Defensive coordinator; Las Vegas Raiders (2024) Linebackers coach & run game coordinator; Tampa Bay Buccaneers (2025–present) Linebackers coach

Awards and highlights
- As coach: Super Bowl champion (LV)

Career NFL statistics
- Games played: 159
- Games started: 49
- Total tackles: 562
- Sacks: 14.5
- Forced fumbles: 6
- Interceptions: 8
- Defensive touchdowns: 3
- Stats at Pro Football Reference
- Coaching profile at Pro Football Reference

Isaiah "Mike" Caldwell, Jr. (born August 31, 1971) is an American football coach who is the current linebackers coach for the Tampa Bay Buccaneers of the National Football League (NFL). He previously served as the defensive coordinator for the Jacksonville Jaguars from 2022 to 2023.

Caldwell played college football as a linebacker at Middle Tennessee State University and was selected in the third round by the Cleveland Browns in the 1993 NFL draft. Caldwell played 11 seasons in the NFL with the Browns, Baltimore Ravens, Arizona Cardinals, Philadelphia Eagles, Chicago Bears and Carolina Panthers.

Caldwell began his professional coaching career with the Eagles in 2008. He previously served as the linebackers coach for the Cardinals, and was the assistant head coach and inside linebackers coach for the New York Jets from 2015 to 2018. He served as the linebackers coach for the Buccaneers from 2019 to 2021 before being hired as the defensive coordinator for the Jaguars. He then served as the run game coordinator and linebackers coach for the Las Vegas Raiders in 2024 before returning to the Buccaneers.

== Playing career ==
=== College ===
Caldwell finished his career with 52 games played and 7 forced fumbles. In 1992, he led the team with 76 tackles (47 solo, 29 assists). He was also a 3rd team All-American that year and 1st team Ohio Valley Conference selection.

=== National Football League ===
Pre-draft measurables
Height	Weight	Arm length	Hand span	40-yard dash	10-yard split	20-yard split	20-yard shuttle	Vertical jump	Broad jump	Bench press
6 ft 1 5/8 in (1.87 m)	226 lb (103 kg)	34 1/4 in (0.87 m)	8 3/8 in (0.21 m)	4.66 s	1.59 s	2.68 s	3.95 s	39.0 in (0.99 m)	10 ft 2 in (3.10 m)	19 reps
All values from NFL Combine

Caldwell made an immediate impact for the Cleveland Browns as a rookie under Bill Belichick and Nick Saban. He would finish with 42, 40, and 70 tackles from 1993 to 1995 with 3 interceptions. After 1 year with the Baltimore Ravens (54 Tackles, 4.5 Sacks, 1 INT) he signed with the Arizona Cardinals in 1997 and had 29 tackles with 2 Sacks and 1 INT.

From 1998 to 2001 he played with the Philadelphia Eagles accumulating 221 tackles with 5 Sacks and 3 INT. In 2002, he went to the Chicago Bears where he had 61 tackles and 3 Sacks before closing out his career with the Carolina Panthers, appearing in just 9 games.

== Coaching career ==
=== Philadelphia Eagles ===
Caldwell was hired by the Philadelphia Eagles as the defensive quality control coach in 2008. He was promoted to assistant linebackers coach on February 3, 2010. He was promoted to linebackers coach on February 7, 2011.

=== New York Jets ===
Caldwell was hired as assistant head coach and inside linebackers coach by the New York Jets on January 23, 2015.

=== Tampa Bay Buccaneers ===
In 2019, Caldwell rejoined the staff of former Arizona Cardinals head coach Bruce Arians alongside former defensive coordinator Todd Bowles. Caldwell earned his first Super Bowl title when the Buccaneers won Super Bowl LV.

=== Jacksonville Jaguars ===
On February 17, 2022, Caldwell was hired by the Jacksonville Jaguars as their defensive coordinator under head coach Doug Pederson. On January 8, 2024, Caldwell and the entire Jaguars defensive staff were fired.

=== Las Vegas Raiders ===
On February 23, 2024, Caldwell was hired by the Las Vegas Raiders as their linebackers coach and run game coordinator under head coach Antonio Pierce. On January 30, 2025, it was announced that Caldwell was not retained by the Raiders' new general manager John Spytek and head coach Pete Carroll.

== Personal life ==
His niece, Nikki Caldwell, is president of the Las Vegas Aces of the WNBA. His son Simeon is currently a Safety at THE OHIO STATE UNIVERSITY
