= 2022 Tennessee Titans season =

63rd season in franchise history

- Owner: KSA Industries
- General manager: Jon Robinson (fired Dec. 6); Ryan Cowden (interim)
- Head coach: Mike Vrabel
- Home stadium: Nissan Stadium

Results
- Record: 7–10
- Division place: 2nd AFC South
- Playoffs: Did not qualify
- All-Pros: DT Jeffery Simmons (2nd team); P Ryan Stonehouse (2nd team)
- Pro Bowlers: RB Derrick Henry; DT Jeffery Simmons; LS Morgan Cox; C Ben Jones

Uniform
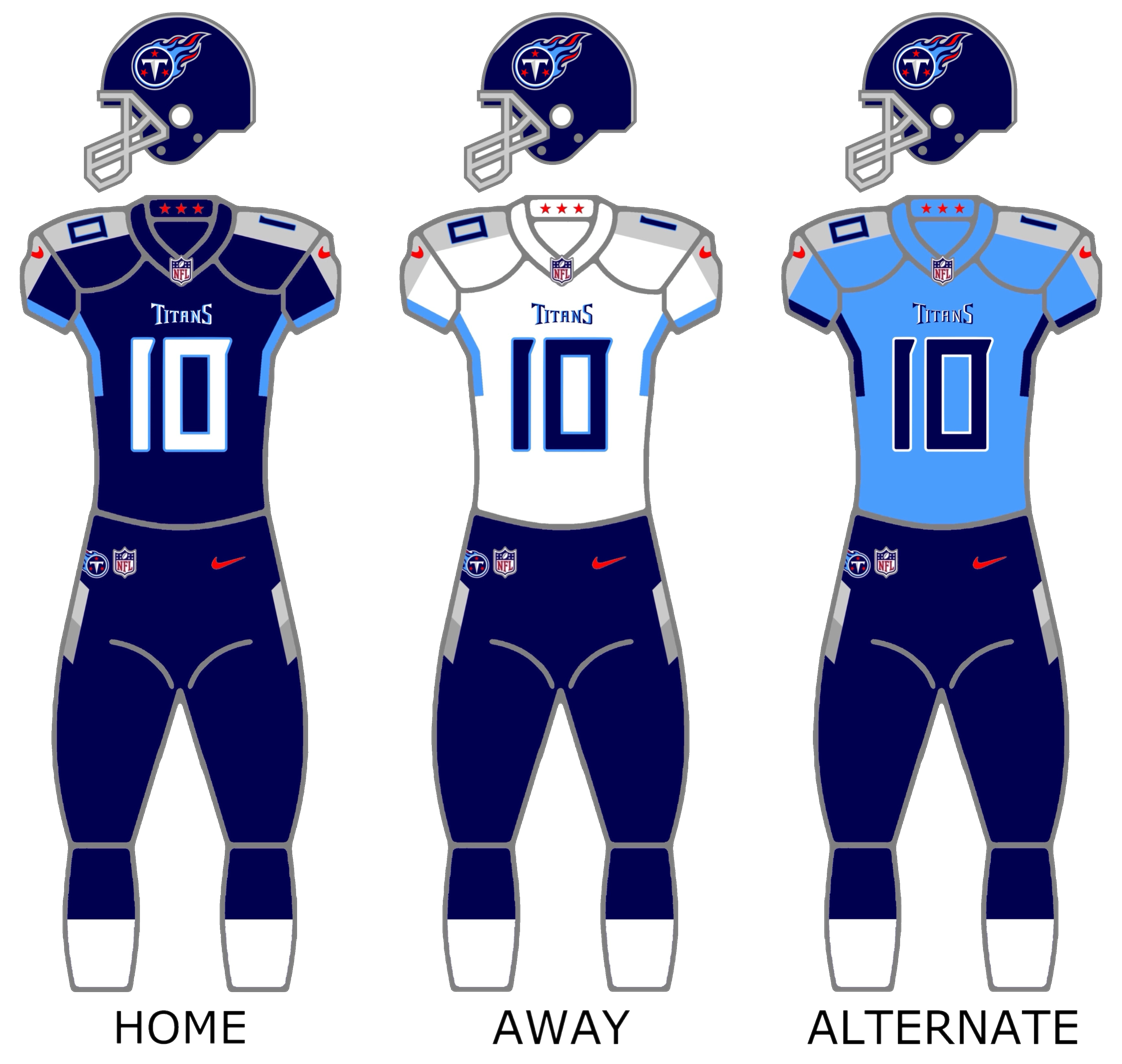

The 2022 season was the Tennessee Titans' 53rd in the National Football League (NFL), their 63rd overall, their 26th in the state of Tennessee and their fifth under head coach Mike Vrabel.

After racing out to a 7–3 start, the Titans suffered a late-season collapse. They ended the season on a seven-game losing streak, their worst losing streak since 2014. The Titans failed to improve on their 12–5 record from last season. They also suffered their first losing season since 2015 and missed the playoffs for the first time since 2018 after a loss to the Jacksonville Jaguars (who beat Tennessee twice after being 4–8 at one point) in the final week of the season. It was the fourth time in franchise history they missed the playoffs after having a first-round bye in the playoffs the previous season (1994, 2001, and 2009).

Inconsistent play and a number of key injuries hindered the Titans throughout the season, including starting quarterback Ryan Tannehill who missed five games, Taylor Lewan who missed 15 games, and Harold Landry who missed the entire season. The Titans finished the season with a league-high 23 players on injured reserve.

== Draft ==
2022 Tennessee Titans Draft
Round	Selection	Player	Position	College	Notes
1	18	Treylon Burks	WR	Arkansas	from New Orleans via Philadelphia (Note: The Titans traded WR A. J. Brown to the Philadelphia Eagles in exchange for first- and third-round selections (18th and 101st overall).)
1	26	Traded to the New York Jets (Note: The Titans traded first- and third-round selections (26th and 101st overall) to the New York Jets in exchange for second-, third- and fifth-round selections (35th, 69th and 163rd overall).)			
2	35	Roger McCreary	CB	Auburn	from NY Jets
2	58	Traded to Atlanta (Note: The Titans traded a second-round selection and a 2023 fourth-round selection to the Atlanta Falcons in exchange for WR Julio Jones and a 2023 sixth-round selection.)			
3	69	Nicholas Petit-Frere	OT	Ohio State	from NY Jets
3	86	Malik Willis	QB	Liberty	from Las Vegas (Note: The Titans traded third- and fifth-round selections (90th and 169th overall) to the Las Vegas Raiders in exchange for a third-round selection (86th overall).)
3	90	Traded to Las Vegas			
3	101	Traded to the New York Jets			2020 Resolution JC-2A selection; from New Orleans via Philadelphia
4	131	Hassan Haskins	RB	Michigan	
4	143	Chig Okonkwo	TE	Maryland	Compensatory pick (Note: The Titans' were awarded compensatory picks in the 4th and 6th rounds due to losses in free agency.)
5	163	Kyle Philips	WR	UCLA	from Pittsburgh via NY Jets
5	169	Traded to Las Vegas			
6	204	Theo Jackson	S	Tennessee	
6	219	Chance Campbell	LB	Ole Miss	Compensatory pick
7	247	Traded to Miami (Note: The Titans traded OL Isaiah Wilson and a seventh-round selection (247th overall) to the Miami Dolphins in exchange for a 2021 seventh-round selection.)			

Draft trades

2022 Tennessee Titans undrafted free agents
Name	Position	College	Ref.
David Anenih	OLB	Houston	
Tre Avery	CB	Rutgers	
Julius Chestnut	RB	Sacred Heart	
Haskell Garrett	DE	Ohio State	
Kenneth George Jr.	CB	Tennessee	
Jack Gibbens	ILB	Minnesota	
Michael Griffin II	S	South Dakota State	
Hayden Howerton	G	SMU	
Brandon Lewis	WR	Air Force	
Jalen McKenzie	OT	USC	
Xavier Newman-Johnson	C, G	Baylor	
Sam Okuayinonu	DE	Maryland	
Jayden Peevy	DE	Texas A&M	
Reggie Roberson	WR	SMU	
Andrew Rupcich	OT	Culver–Stockton	
Caleb Shudak	K	Iowa	
Ryan Stonehouse	P	Colorado State	
Tre Swilling	CB	Georgia Tech	
Thomas Odukoya	TE	Eastern Michigan (IPPP)	

Made regular season roster

== Staff ==
2022 Tennessee Titans staff
Front office: Owner – KSA Industries; Controlling owner – Amy Adams Strunk; President/CEO – Burke Nihill; Executive vice president/general manager – Ryan Cowden (interim); Vice president of football administration – Vin Marino; Vice president of player personnel – Ryan Cowden; Director of player personnel – Monti Ossenfort; Director of college scouting – Jon Salge; Director of pro scouting – Brian Gardner; Assistant director of pro scouting – Kevin Turks; Pro scout – Blaise Taylor; College scout – Matt Miller; Head coaches: Head coach – Mike Vrabel; Offensive coaches: Offensive coordinator – Todd Downing; Passing game coordinator – Tim Kelly; Quarterbacks – Pat O'Hara; Running backs – Tony Dews; Wide receivers – Rob Moore; Tight ends – Luke Steckel; Offensive line – Keith Carter; Assistant offensive line – Mike Sullivan; Assistant offensive line – Jason Houghtaling; Offensive assistant – Erik Frazier; Offensive assistant – Kylan Butler	Defensive coaches: Defensive coordinator – Shane Bowen; Defensive line – Terrell Williams; Assistant defensive line – Clint McMillan; Outside linebackers – Ryan Crow; Inside linebackers – Bobby King; Assistant inside linebackers – Zak Kuhr; Secondary − Anthony Midget; Safeties – Scott Booker; Senior defensive assistant – Jim Schwartz; Special teams coaches: Special teams coordinator – Craig Aukerman; Assistant special teams – Chase Blackburn; Strength and conditioning: Strength and conditioning – Frank Piraino; Strength and conditioning assistant – Brian Bell

== Final roster ==
2022 Tennessee Titans roster
Quarterbacks (QB): 11 Joshua Dobbs; 7 Malik Willis; Running backs (RB): 36 Julius Chestnut; 25 Hassan Haskins; 22 Derrick Henry; 33 Jonathan Ward; Wide receivers (WR): 16 Treylon Burks; 19 Chris Conley; 13 Racey McMath; 15 Nick Westbrook-Ikhine; 2 Robert Woods; Tight ends (TE): 81 Austin Hooper; 85 Chig Okonkwo; 86 Kevin Rader; 87 Geoff Swaim	Offensive linemen (OL): 55 Aaron Brewer G; 61 Le'Raven Clark T; 71 Dennis Daley T; 62 Corey Levin C; 69 Daniel Munyer C; 67 Xavier Newman-Johnson G; 78 Nicholas Petit-Frere T; 70 Jordan Roos G; Defensive linemen (DL): 94 Mario Edwards Jr. DE; 90 Naquan Jones NT; 98 Jeffery Simmons DT; 97 Kevin Strong DT; 93 Teair Tart NT; 95 DeMarcus Walker DE	Linebackers (LB): 96 Denico Autry OLB; 57 Tarell Basham OLB; 53 Dylan Cole ILB; 50 Jack Gibbens ILB; 42 Joseph Jones ILB; 56 Monty Rice ILB; 54 Andre Smith OLB; 99 Rashad Weaver OLB; Defensive backs (DB): 30 Tre Avery CB; 44 Mike Brown S; 31 Kevin Byard FS; 26 Kristian Fulton CB; 38 Davontae Harris CB; 37 Amani Hooker SS; 20 Lonnie Johnson Jr. SS; 28 Joshua Kalu SS; 32 Greg Mabin CB; 21 Roger McCreary CB; 29 Josh Thompson CB; Special teams (ST): 14 Randy Bullock K; 46 Morgan Cox LS; 4 Ryan Stonehouse P	Practice squad: 79 Curtis Brooks DE; 45 Kyron Brown CB; 23 Shyheim Carter S; 10 Dez Fitzpatrick WR; 5 Kevin Hogan QB; 66 Danny Isidora G; 68 Zack Johnson G; 12 Mason Kinsey WR; 52 Zach McCloud OLB; 40 Nate Meadors S; 49 Thomas Odukoya TE (IPP); 59 Sam Okuayinonu OLB; 72 Jayden Peevy DE; 88 Reggie Roberson WR; 76 Andrew Rupcich T; 6 Caleb Shudak K; Reserve: 47 Andrew Adams FS (IR); 80 C. J. Board WR (IR); -- Chance Campbell ILB (IR); -- Trenton Cannon RB (IR); 41 Zach Cunningham ILB (IR); 64 Nate Davis G (IR); 48 Bud Dupree OLB (IR); 3 Caleb Farley CB (IR); -- Da'Shawn Hand DE (IR); -- Dontrell Hilliard RB (IR); 8 Cody Hollister WR (IR); 35 Chris Jackson CB (IR); 60 Ben Jones C (IR); 73 Jamarco Jones G (IR); 58 Harold Landry OLB (IR); 77 Taylor Lewan T (IR); 51 David Long Jr. ILB (IR); 39 Terrance Mitchell CB (IR); 24 Elijah Molden CB (IR); -- A. J. Moore FS (IR); 18 Kyle Philips WR (IR); 75 Dillon Radunz G (IR); 17 Ryan Tannehill QB (IR); Rookies in italics 51 active, 23 reserve, 15 practice squad (1 exempt)

=== Team captains ===
- Ryan Tannehill (QB)
- Derrick Henry (RB)
- Ben Jones (C)
- Jeffery Simmons (DT)
- Kevin Byard (FS)
- Ola Adeniyi (ST)

== Preseason ==
The Titans' preseason opponents and schedule were announced in the spring.

Week	Date	Opponent	Result	Record	Venue	Recap
1	August 11	at Baltimore Ravens	L 10–23	0–1	M&T Bank Stadium	Recap
2	August 20	Tampa Bay Buccaneers	W 13–3	1–1	Nissan Stadium	Recap
3	August 27	Arizona Cardinals	W 26–23	2–1	Nissan Stadium	Recap

== Regular season ==
=== Schedule ===
On May 9, the NFL announced that the Titans would play at the Buffalo Bills at 6:15 p.m. CDT on September 19, as part of ESPN's Week 2 Monday Night doubleheader.

The remainder of the Titans' 2022 schedule, with exact dates and times, was announced on May 12.

Week	Date	Opponent	Result	Record	Venue	Recap
1	September 11	New York Giants	**L** 20–21	0–1	Nissan Stadium	Recap
2	September 19	at Buffalo Bills	**L** 7–41	0–2	Highmark Stadium	Recap
3	September 25	Las Vegas Raiders	**W** 24–22	1–2	Nissan Stadium	Recap
4	October 2	at **Indianapolis Colts**	**W** 24–17	2–2	Lucas Oil Stadium	Recap
5	October 9	at Washington Commanders	**W** 21–17	3–2	FedExField	Recap
6	Bye					
7	October 23	**Indianapolis Colts**	**W** 19–10	4–2	Nissan Stadium	Recap
8	October 30	at **Houston Texans**	**W** 17–10	5–2	NRG Stadium	Recap
9	November 6	at Kansas City Chiefs	**L** 17–20 (OT)	5–3	Arrowhead Stadium	Recap
10	November 13	Denver Broncos	**W** 17–10	6–3	Nissan Stadium	Recap
11	November 17	at Green Bay Packers	**W** 27–17	7–3	Lambeau Field	Recap
12	November 27	Cincinnati Bengals	**L** 16–20	7–4	Nissan Stadium	Recap
13	December 4	at Philadelphia Eagles	**L** 10–35	7–5	Lincoln Financial Field	Recap
14	December 11	**Jacksonville Jaguars**	**L** 22–36	7–6	Nissan Stadium	Recap
15	December 18	at Los Angeles Chargers	**L** 14–17	7–7	SoFi Stadium	Recap
16	December 24	**Houston Texans**	**L** 14–19	7–8	Nissan Stadium	Recap
17	December 29	Dallas Cowboys	**L** 13–27	7–9	Nissan Stadium	Recap
18	January 7	at **Jacksonville Jaguars**	**L** 16–20	7–10	TIAA Bank Field	Recap

Note: Intra-division opponents are in bold text.

=== Game summaries ===
==== Week 1: vs. New York Giants ====
Week 1: New York Giants at Tennessee Titans – Game summary

Quarter	1	2	3	4	Total
**Giants**	0	0	13	8	**21**
Titans	7	6	7	0	**20**

at Nissan Stadium, Nashville, Tennessee

- Date: September 11
- Game time: 3:25 p.m. CDT
- Game weather: Cloudy, 75 °F (24 °C)
- Game attendance: 67,805
- Referee: Jerome Boger
- TV announcers (Fox): Kevin Kugler, Mark Sanchez and Laura Okmin
- Recap, Game Book

Game information

**First quarter**

- TEN – Dontrell Hilliard 7-yard pass from Ryan Tannehill (Randy Bullock kick), 9:48. Titans 7–0. **Drive: 5 plays, 45 yards, 3:00.**

**Second quarter**

- TEN – Randy Bullock 46-yard field goal, 12:35. Titans 10–0. **Drive: 10 plays, 65 yards, 4:34.**
- TEN – Randy Bullock 23-yard field goal, 6:57. Titans 13–0. **Drive: 7 plays, 37 yards, 3:03.**

**Third quarter**

- NYG – Saquon Barkley 4-yard run (run failed), 11:16. Titans 13–6. **Drive: 4 plays, 90 yards, 1:29.**
- NYG – Sterling Shepard 65-yard pass from Daniel Jones (Graham Gano kick), 8:48. Tied 13–13. **Drive: 2 plays, 64 yards, 0:40.**
- TEN – Dontrell Hilliard 23-yard pass from Ryan Tannehill (Randy Bullock kick), 2:54. Titans 20–13. **Drive: 9 plays, 75 yards, 5:54.**

**Fourth quarter**

- NYG – Chris Myarick 1-yard pass from Daniel Jones (Daniel Jones pass to Saquon Barkley), 1:06. Giants 21–20. **Drive: 12 plays, 73 yards, 4:21.**

**Top passers**

- NYG – Daniel Jones – 17/21, 188 yards, 2 TD, INT
- TEN – Ryan Tannehill – 20/33, 266 yards, 2 TD

**Top rushers**

- NYG – Saquon Barkley – 18 rushes, 164 yards, TD
- TEN – Derrick Henry – 21 rushes, 82 yards

**Top receivers**

- NYG – Saquon Barkley – 6 receptions, 30 yards
- TEN – Kyle Philips – 6 receptions, 66 yards

The Titans blew a 13–0 lead and lost to the Giants, 21–20, on a one-yard pass from Daniel Jones to Saquon Barkley. With the upset loss, the Titans started the season 0–1.

==== Week 2: at Buffalo Bills ====
Week 2: Tennessee Titans at Buffalo Bills – Game Summary

Quarter	1	2	3	4	Total
Titans	7	0	0	0	**7**
**Bills**	7	10	24	0	**41**

at Highmark Stadium, Orchard Park, New York

- Date: September 19
- Game time: 7:15 p.m. EDT/6:15 p.m. CDT
- Game weather: Partly cloudy, 70 °F (21 °C)
- Game attendance: 70,683
- Referee: Shawn Smith
- TV announcers (WZTV/ESPN): Steve Levy, Louis Riddick, Dan Orlovsky and Laura Rutledge
- Recap, Game Book

Game information

**First quarter**

- BUF – Reggie Gilliam 11-yard pass from Josh Allen (Tyler Bass kick), 9:07. Bills 7–0. **Drive: 12 plays, 75 yards, 5:53.**
- TEN – Derrick Henry 2-yard run (Randy Bullock kick), 5:23. Tied 7–7. **Drive: 9 plays, 75 yards, 3:44.**

**Second quarter**

- BUF – Tyler Bass 49-yard field goal, 7:20. Bills 10–7. **Drive: 6 plays, 51 yards, 2:34.**
- BUF – Stefon Diggs 4-yard pass from Josh Allen (Tyler Bass kick), 1:00. Bills 17–7. **Drive: 8 plays, 77 yards, 4:10.**

**Third quarter**

- BUF – Stefon Diggs 46-yard pass from Josh Allen (Tyler Bass kick), 10:18. Bills 24–7. **Drive: 7 plays, 80 yards, 2:26.**
- BUF – Tyler Bass 37-yard field goal, 7:32. Bills 27–7. **Drive: 4 plays, 1 yard, 0:50.**
- BUF – Stefon Diggs 14-yard pass from Josh Allen (Tyler Bass kick), 5:34. Bills 34–7. **Drive: 4 plays, 5 yards, 1:13.**
- BUF – Matt Milano 43-yard interception return (Tyler Bass kick), 3:49. Bills 41–7.

**Fourth quarter**

- No scoring plays.

**Top passers**

- TEN – Ryan Tannehill – 11/20, 117 yards, 2 INT
- BUF – Josh Allen – 26/38, 317 yards, 4 TD

**Top rushers**

- TEN – Hassan Haskins – 9 rushes, 37 yards
- BUF – James Cook – 11 rushes, 53 yards

**Top receivers**

- TEN – Treylon Burks – 4 receptions, 47 yards
- BUF – Stefon Diggs – 12 receptions, 148 yards, 3 TD

The Titans flew to Orchard Park for their matchup against the Bills as part of a Monday Night Football doubleheader. The Bills took the opening kickoff and stormed down the field with a methodical 12-play touchdown drive to grab an early 7–0 lead. The Titans responded with a 9-play drive capped off by star running back Derrick Henry's 2-yard touchdown run. From that point on, however, it was all Bills. It started when kicker Tyler Bass converted a 49-yard field goal to go up by 3. Josh Allen then hit Stefon Diggs for the first of three touchdowns on the night for him; a sack by the Bills' defense capped off the first half, with Buffalo holding a 17–7 lead.

In the third quarter, the Bills blew the game open after Allen hit Diggs for the second of three touchdowns for the pair on the night; the Titans were quickly forced into a punt which Bass converted into his second field goal. Following the score, Tannehill was picked off at the Bills' 49-yard line. The offense capitalized on the turnover and exploited the already-exhausted Titan defense for Diggs's third touchdown catch of the night. On the Titans' next drive, Tannehill was again picked off, the interception this time going back for six courtesy of Matt Milano. By this point, the Bills had scored 24 points in the third quarter to grab a commanding 41–7 lead. Both teams' defenses took over for the rest of the game, but by this point, the game had long been decided.

With the loss, the Titans fell to 0–2.

==== Week 3: vs. Las Vegas Raiders ====
Week 3: Las Vegas Raiders at Tennessee Titans – Game summary

Quarter	1	2	3	4	Total
Raiders	3	7	3	9	**22**
**Titans**	7	17	0	0	**24**

at Nissan Stadium, Nashville, Tennessee

- Date: September 25
- Game time: 12:00 p.m. CDT
- Game weather: Cloudy, 77 °F (25 °C)
- Game attendance: 68,649
- Referee: Brad Rogers
- TV announcers (Fox): Kenny Albert, Jonathan Vilma and Shannon Spake
- Recap, Game Book

Game information

**First quarter**

- TEN – Geoff Swaim 2-yard pass from Ryan Tannehill (Randy Bullock kick), 7:22. Titans 7–0. **Drive: 12 plays, 75 yards, 7:38.**
- LV – Daniel Carlson 21-yard field goal, 2:19. Titans 7–3. **Drive: 9 plays, 72 yards, 5:03.**

**Second quarter**

- TEN – Derrick Henry 1-yard run (Randy Bullock kick), 14:25. Titans 14–3. **Drive: 6 plays, 75 yards, 2:54.**
- LV – Davante Adams 5-yard pass from Derek Carr (Daniel Carlson kick), 9:44. Titans 14–10. **Drive: 7 plays, 75 yards, 4:41.**
- TEN – Ryan Tannehill 1-yard run (Randy Bullock kick), 4:55. Titans 21–10. **Drive: 8 plays, 79 yards, 4:49.**
- TEN – Randy Bullock 48-yard field goal, 0:00. Titans 24–10. **Drive: 3 plays, 19 yards, 0:21.**

**Third quarter**

- LV – Daniel Carlson 32-yard field goal, 6:57. Titans 24–13. **Drive: 14 plays, 61 yards, 8:03.**

**Fourth quarter**

- LV – Daniel Carlson 35-yard field goal, 3:29. Titans 24–16. **Drive: 7 plays, 63 yards, 2:39.**
- LV – Mack Hollins 9-yard pass from Derek Carr (two-point pass failed), 1:14. Titans 24–22. **Drive: 14 plays, 81 yards, 1:43.**

**Top passers**

- LV – Derek Carr – 26/44, 303 yards, 2 TD, INT
- TEN – Ryan Tannehill – 19/27, 264 yards, TD, INT

**Top rushers**

- LV – Josh Jacobs – 13 rushes, 66 yards
- TEN – Derrick Henry – 20 rushes, 85 yards, TD

**Top receivers**

- LV – Mack Hollins – 8 receptions, 158 yards, TD
- TEN – Robert Woods – 4 receptions, 85 yards

==== Week 4: at Indianapolis Colts ====
Week 4: Tennessee Titans at Indianapolis Colts – Game summary

Quarter	1	2	3	4	Total
**Titans**	14	10	0	0	**24**
Colts	0	10	7	0	**17**

at Lucas Oil Stadium, Indianapolis, Indiana

- Date: October 2
- Game time: 1:00 p.m. EDT/12:00 p.m. CDT
- Game weather: Sunny, 63 °F (17 °C) (retractable roof open)
- Game attendance: 65,781
- Referee: Scott Novak
- TV announcers (Fox): Adam Amin, Mark Schlereth and Kristina Pink
- Recap, Game Book

Game information

**First quarter**

- TEN – Robert Woods 7-yard pass from Ryan Tannehill (Randy Bullock kick), 8:00. Titans 7–0. **Drive: 5 plays, 32 yards, 2:47.**
- TEN – Derrick Henry 19-yard run (Randy Bullock kick), 3:46. Titans 14–0. **Drive: 6 plays, 75 yards, 3:19.**

**Second quarter**

- IND – Chase McLaughlin 27-yard field goal, 13:25. Titans 14–3. **Drive: 11 plays, 66 yards, 5:21.**
- TEN – Randy Bullock 44-yard field goal, 9:39. Titans 17–3. **Drive: 9 plays, 41 yards, 3:46.**
- TEN – Chig Okonkwo 8-yard pass from Ryan Tannehill (Randy Bullock kick), 7:40. Titans 24–3. **Drive: 5 plays, 28 yards, 1:54.**
- IND – Mo Alie-Cox 14-yard pass from Matt Ryan (Chase McLaughlin kick), 2:13. Titans 24–10. **Drive: 9 plays, 75 yards, 5:27.**

**Third quarter**

- IND – Mo Alie-Cox 7-yard pass from Matt Ryan (Chase McLaughlin kick), 7:26. Titans 24–17. **Drive: 8 plays, 67 yards, 5:09.**

**Fourth quarter**

- No scoring plays.

**Top passers**

- TEN – Ryan Tannehill – 17/21, 137 yards, 2 TD
- IND – Matt Ryan – 27/37, 356 yards, 2 TD, INT

**Top rushers**

- TEN – Derrick Henry – 22 rushes, 114 yards, TD
- IND – Jonathan Taylor – 20 rushes, 42 yards

**Top receivers**

- TEN – Robert Woods – 4 receptions, 30 yards, TD
- IND – Mo Alie-Cox – 6 receptions, 85 yards, 2 TD

==== Week 5: at Washington Commanders ====
Week 5: Tennessee Titans at Washington Commanders – Game summary

Quarter	1	2	3	4	Total
**Titans**	7	7	7	0	**21**
Commanders	3	7	7	0	**17**

at FedExField, Landover, Maryland

- Date: October 9
- Game time: 1:00 p.m. EDT/12:00 p.m. CDT
- Game weather: Sunny, 61 °F (16 °C)
- Game attendance: 51,836
- Referee: Land Clark
- TV announcers (CBS): Andrew Catalon, James Lofton and Amanda Renner
- Recap, Game Book

Game information

**First quarter**

- TEN – Dontrell Hilliard 13-yard pass from Ryan Tannehill (Randy Bullock kick), 3:58. Titans 7–0. **Drive: 6 plays, 52 yards, 2:32.**
- WAS – Joey Slye 50-yard field goal, 0:26. Titans 7–3. **Drive: 7 plays, 43 yards, 3:32.**

**Second quarter**

- WAS – Dyami Brown 75-yard pass from Carson Wentz (Joey Slye kick), 13:56. Commanders 10–7. **Drive: 1 play, 75 yards, 0:10.**
- TEN – Derrick Henry 1-yard run (Randy Bullock kick), 0:17. Titans 14–10. **Drive: 15 plays, 81 yards, 6:57.**

**Third quarter**

- WAS – Dyami Brown 30-yard pass from Carson Wentz (Joey Slye kick), 4:36. Commanders 17–14. **Drive: 6 plays, 80 yards, 3:14.**
- TEN – Derrick Henry 1-yard run (Randy Bullock kick), 1:03. Titans 21–17. **Drive: 7 plays, 75 yards, 3:33.**

**Fourth quarter**

- No scoring plays.

**Top passers**

- TEN – Ryan Tannehill – 15/25, 181 yards, TD
- WAS – Carson Wentz – 25/38, 359 yards, 2 TD, INT

**Top rushers**

- TEN – Derrick Henry – 28 rushes, 102 yards, 2 TD
- WAS – Brian Robinson Jr. – 9 rushes, 22 yards

**Top receivers**

- TEN – Nick Westbrook-Ikhine – 2 receptions, 72 yards
- WAS – Dyami Brown – 2 receptions, 105 yards, 2 TD

==== Week 7: vs. Indianapolis Colts ====
Week 7: Indianapolis Colts at Tennessee Titans – Game summary

Quarter	1	2	3	4	Total
Colts	0	0	7	3	**10**
**Titans**	3	10	0	6	**19**

at Nissan Stadium, Nashville, Tennessee

- Date: October 23
- Game time: 12:00 p.m. CDT
- Game weather: Sunny, 74 °F (23 °C)
- Game attendance: 69,459
- Referee: Ronald Torbert
- TV announcers (CBS): Andrew Catalon, James Lofton and Don Bell
- Recap, Game Book

Game information

**First quarter**

- TEN – Randy Bullock 27-yard field goal, 4:03. Titans 3–0. **Drive: 11 plays, 62 yards, 5:32.**

**Second quarter**

- TEN – Andrew Adams 76-yard interception return (Randy Bullock kick), 9:25. Titans 10–0.
- TEN – Randy Bullock 28-yard field goal, 1:57. Titans 13–0. **Drive: 8 plays, 52 yards, 3:44.**

**Third quarter**

- IND – Parris Campbell 4-yard pass from Matt Ryan (Chase McLaughlin kick), 4:07. Titans 13–7. **Drive: 12 plays, 58 yards, 6:20.**

**Fourth quarter**

- TEN – Randy Bullock 38-yard field goal, 13:47. Titans 16–7. **Drive: 11 plays, 55 yards, 5:20.**
- IND – Chase McLaughlin 50-yard field goal, 8:31. Titans 16–10. **Drive: 6 plays, 24 yards, 2:35.**
- TEN – Randy Bullock 48-yard field goal, 4:47. Titans 19–10. **Drive: 9 plays, 41 yards, 3:44.**

**Top passers**

- IND – Matt Ryan – 33/44, 243 yards, TD, 2 INT
- TEN – Ryan Tannehill – 13/20, 132 yards

**Top rushers**

- IND – Jonathan Taylor – 10 rushes, 58 yards
- TEN – Derrick Henry – 30 rushes, 128 yards

**Top receivers**

- IND – Parris Campbell – 10 receptions, 70 yards, TD
- TEN – Austin Hooper – 3 receptions, 56 yards

==== Week 8: at Houston Texans ====
Week 8: Tennessee Titans at Houston Texans – Game summary

Quarter	1	2	3	4	Total
**Titans**	0	7	7	3	**17**
Texans	0	3	0	7	**10**

at NRG Stadium, Houston, Texas

- Date: October 30
- Game time: 3:05 p.m. CDT
- Game weather: None (retractable roof closed)
- Game attendance: 65,515
- Referee: Clay Martin
- TV announcers (CBS): Greg Gumbel, Adam Archuleta and AJ Ross
- Recap, Game Book

Game information

**First quarter**

- No scoring plays.

**Second quarter**

- HOU – Kaʻimi Fairbairn 43-yard field goal, 10:40. Texans 3–0. **Drive: 4 plays, -13 yards, 1:11.**
- TEN – Derrick Henry 29-yard run (Randy Bullock kick), 4:20. Titans 7–3. **Drive: 3 plays, 37 yards, 0:53.**

**Third quarter**

- TEN – Derrick Henry 1-yard run (Randy Bullock kick), 6:31. Titans 14–3. **Drive: 9 plays, 65 yards, 6:19.**

**Fourth quarter**

- TEN – Randy Bullock 29-yard field goal, 11:08. Titans 17–3. **Drive: 12 plays, 81 yards, 7:16.**
- HOU – Dameon Pierce 3-yard pass from Davis Mills (Kaʻimi Fairbairn kick), 0:17. Titans 17–10. **Drive: 12 plays, 90 yards, 3:46.**

**Top passers**

- TEN – Malik Willis – 6/10, 55 yards, INT
- HOU – Davis Mills – 17/29, 152 yards, TD, INT

**Top rushers**

- TEN – Derrick Henry – 32 rushes, 219 yards, 2 TD
- HOU – Dameon Pierce – 15 rushes, 35 yards

**Top receivers**

- TEN – Robert Woods – 2 receptions, 26 yards
- HOU – Brandin Cooks – 4 receptions, 73 yards

==== Week 9: at Kansas City Chiefs ====
Week 9: Tennessee Titans at Kansas City Chiefs – Game summary

Quarter	1	2	3	4	OT	Total
Titans	0	14	3	0	0	**17**
**Chiefs**	3	6	0	8	3	**20**

at Arrowhead Stadium, Kansas City, Missouri

- Date: November 6
- Game time: 7:20 p.m. CST
- Game weather: 58 °F (14 °C)
- Game attendance: 73,475
- Referee: Clete Blakeman
- TV announcers (NBC): Mike Tirico, Cris Collinsworth and Melissa Stark
- Recap, Game Book

Game information

**First quarter**

- KC – Harrison Butker 23-yard field goal, 6:47. Chiefs 3–0. **Drive: 15 plays, 69 yards, 8:13.**

**Second quarter**

- KC – Mecole Hardman 7-yard pass from Patrick Mahomes (kick failed, wide left), 14:55. Chiefs 9–0. **Drive: 9 plays, 79 yards, 4:30.**
- TEN – Derrick Henry 4-yard run (Randy Bullock kick), 10:48. Chiefs 9–7. **Drive: 7 plays, 74 yards, 4:07.**
- TEN – Derrick Henry 1-yard run (Randy Bullock kick), 5:24. Titans 14–9. **Drive: 5 plays, 79 yards, 2:50.**

**Third quarter**

- TEN – Randy Bullock 44-yard field goal, 9:58. Titans 17–9. **Drive: 4 plays, 8 yards, 1:29.**

**Fourth quarter**

- KC – Patrick Mahomes 14-yard run (Patrick Mahomes run), 2:56. Tied 17–17. **Drive: 13 plays, 93 yards, 6:58.**

**Overtime**

- KC – Harrison Butker 28-yard field goal, 4:04. Chiefs 20–17. **Drive: 13 plays, 64 yards, 5:56.**

**Top passers**

- TEN – Malik Willis – 5/16, 80 yards
- KC – Patrick Mahomes – 43/68, 446 yards, TD, INT

**Top rushers**

- TEN – Derrick Henry – 17 rushes, 115 yards, 2 TD
- KC – Patrick Mahomes – 6 rushes, 63 yards, TD

**Top receivers**

- TEN – Austin Hooper – 2 receptions, 34 yards
- KC – Travis Kelce – 10 receptions, 106 yards

==== Week 10: vs. Denver Broncos ====
Week 10: Denver Broncos at Tennessee Titans – Game summary

Quarter	1	2	3	4	Total
Broncos	0	10	0	0	**10**
**Titans**	0	7	7	3	**17**

at Nissan Stadium, Nashville, Tennessee

- Date: November 13
- Game time: 12:00 p.m. CST
- Game weather: Cloudy, 35 °F (2 °C)
- Game attendance: 69,240
- Referee: Scott Novak
- TV announcers (CBS): Andrew Catalon, James Lofton and Amanda Renner
- Recap, Game Book

Game information

**First quarter**

- No scoring plays.

**Second quarter**

- DEN – Jalen Virgil 66-yard pass from Russell Wilson (Brandon McManus kick), 8:21. Broncos 7–0. **Drive: 6 plays, 80 yards, 3:00.**
- DEN – Brandon McManus 39-yard field goal, 2:23. Broncos 10–0. **Drive: 9 plays, 41 yards, 3:55.**
- TEN – Nick Westbrook-Ikhine 9-yard pass from Ryan Tannehill (Randy Bullock kick), 0:12. Broncos 10–7. **Drive: 9 plays, 75 yards, 2:11.**

**Third quarter**

- TEN – Nick Westbrook-Ikhine 63-yard pass from Ryan Tannehill (Randy Bullock kick), 5:14. Titans 14–10. **Drive: 3 plays, 80 yards, 1:39.**

**Fourth quarter**

- TEN – Randy Bullock 35-yard field goal, 2:59. Titans 17–10. **Drive: 10 plays, 63 yards, 3:52.**

**Top passers**

- DEN – Russell Wilson – 21/42, 286 yards, TD, INT
- TEN – Ryan Tannehill – 19/36, 255 yards, 2 TD

**Top rushers**

- DEN – Latavius Murray – 9 rushes, 24 yards
- TEN – Derrick Henry – 19 rushes, 53 yards

**Top receivers**

- DEN – Courtland Sutton – 6 receptions, 66 yards
- TEN – Nick Westbrook-Ikhine – 5 receptions, 119 yards, 2 TD

==== Week 11: at Green Bay Packers ====
Week 11: Tennessee Titans at Green Bay Packers – Game summary

Quarter	1	2	3	4	Total
**Titans**	7	7	6	7	**27**
Packers	6	0	11	0	**17**

at Lambeau Field, Green Bay, Wisconsin

- Date: November 17
- Game time: 7:15 p.m. CST
- Game weather: Cloudy, 26 °F (−3 °C)
- Game attendance: 77,506
- Referee: Bill Vinovich
- TV announcers (WTVF/Prime Video): Al Michaels, Kirk Herbstreit and Kaylee Hartung
- Recap, Game Book

Game information

**First quarter**

- TEN – Dontrell Hilliard 14-yard pass from Ryan Tannehill (Josh Lambo kick), 10:31. Titans 7–0. **Drive: 8 plays, 83 yards, 4:29.**
- GB – Christian Watson 14-yard pass from Aaron Rodgers (kick blocked), 0:00. Titans 7–6. **Drive: 11 plays, 78 yards, 7:01.**

**Second quarter**

- TEN – Derrick Henry 4-yard run (Josh Lambo kick), 0:32. Titans 14–6. **Drive: 9 plays, 41 yards, 2:49.**

**Third quarter**

- GB – Mason Crosby 39-yard field goal, 8:25. Titans 14–9. **Drive: 13 plays, 51 yards, 6:35.**
- TEN – Austin Hooper 3-yard pass from Derrick Henry (kick failed, hit right upright), 5:17. Titans 20–9. **Drive: 6 plays, 91 yards, 3:08.**
- GB – Christian Watson 8-yard pass from Aaron Rodgers (Aaron Rodgers–Aaron Jones pass), 2:04. Titans 20–17. **Drive: 7 plays, 69 yards, 3:13.**

**Fourth quarter**

- TEN – Austin Hooper 16-yard pass from Ryan Tannehill (Josh Lambo kick), 14:55. Titans 27–17. **Drive: 5 plays, 63 yards, 2:09.**

**Top passers**

- TEN– Ryan Tannehill – 22/27, 333 yards, 2 TD, INT
- GB – Aaron Rodgers – 24/39, 224 yards, 3 TD

**Top rushers**

- TEN – Derrick Henry – 28 rushes, 87 yards, TD
- GB – Aaron Jones – 12 rushes, 40 yards

**Top receivers**

- TEN – Treylon Burks – 7 receptions, 111 yards
- GB – Randall Cobb – 6 receptions, 73 yards

==== Week 12: vs. Cincinnati Bengals ====
Week 12: Cincinnati Bengals at Tennessee Titans – Game summary

Quarter	1	2	3	4	Total
**Bengals**	0	10	3	7	**20**
Titans	0	10	3	3	**16**

at Nissan Stadium, Nashville, Tennessee

- Date: November 27
- Game time: 12:00 p.m. CST
- Game weather: Cloudy, 55 °F (13 °C)
- Game attendance: 69,441
- Referee: Carl Cheffers
- TV announcers (CBS): Ian Eagle, Charles Davis and Evan Washburn
- Recap, Game Book

Game information

**First quarter**

- No scoring plays.

**Second quarter**

- TEN – Caleb Shudak 33-yard field goal, 14:06. Titans 3–0. **Drive: 10 plays, 39 yards, 4:01.**
- CIN – Evan McPherson 47-yard field goal, 11:30. Tied 3–3. **Drive: 7 plays, 47 yards, 2:36.**
- TEN – Treylon Burks fumble recovery in end zone (Caleb Shudak kick), 11:15. Titans 10–3.
- CIN – Samaje Perine 7-yard run (Evan McPherson kick), 1:55. Tied 10–10. **Drive: 9 plays, 92 yards, 5:34.**

**Third quarter**

- CIN – Evan McPherson 38-yard field goal, 2:35. Bengals 13–10. **Drive: 14 plays, 60 yards, 5:19.**
- TEN – Caleb Shudak 24-yard field goal, 0:39. Tied 13–13. **Drive: 15 plays, 69 yards, 1:56.**

**Fourth quarter**

- CIN – Tee Higgins 27-yard pass from Joe Burrow (Evan McPherson kick), 13:42. Bengals 20–13. **Drive: 6 plays, 75 yards, 1:57.**
- TEN – Caleb Shudak 38-yard field goal, 6:07. Bengals 20–16. **Drive: 12 plays, 55 yards, 7:35.**

**Top passers**

- CIN – Joe Burrow – 22/37, 270 yards, TD
- TEN – Ryan Tannehill – 22/34, 291 yards

**Top rushers**

- CIN – Samaje Perine – 17 rushes, 58 yards, TD
- TEN – Derrick Henry – 17 rushes, 38 yards

**Top receivers**

- CIN – Tee Higgins – 7 receptions, 114 yards, TD
- TEN – Derrick Henry – 3 receptions, 79 yards

==== Week 13: at Philadelphia Eagles ====
Week 13: Tennessee Titans at Philadelphia Eagles – Game summary

Quarter	1	2	3	4	Total
Titans	7	3	0	0	**10**
**Eagles**	7	14	7	7	**35**

at Lincoln Financial Field, Philadelphia, Pennsylvania

- Date: December 4
- Game time: 1:00 p.m. EST/12:00 p.m. CST
- Game weather: Mostly sunny, 45 °F (7 °C)
- Game attendance: 69,879
- Referee: Adrian Hill
- TV announcers (Fox): Kevin Burkhardt, Greg Olsen and Erin Andrews
- Recap, Game Book

Game information

**First quarter**

- PHI – DeVonta Smith 34-yard pass from Jalen Hurts (Jake Elliott kick), 12:03. Eagles 7–0. **Drive: 7 plays, 75 yards, 2:57.**
- TEN – Treylon Burks 25-yard pass from Ryan Tannehill (Randy Bullock kick), 2:47. Tied 7–7. **Drive: 10 plays, 71 yards, 5:28.**

**Second quarter**

- PHI – A. J. Brown 40-yard pass from Jalen Hurts (Jake Elliott kick), 13:55. Eagles 14–7. **Drive: 7 plays, 85 yards, 3:52.**
- TEN – Randy Bullock 36-yard field goal, 3:28. Eagles 14–10. **Drive: 10 plays, 69 yards, 5:21.**
- PHI – Jalen Hurts 2-yard run (Jake Elliott kick), 0:51. Eagles 21–10. **Drive: 7 plays, 75 yards, 2:37.**

**Third quarter**

- PHI – A. J. Brown 29-yard pass from Jalen Hurts (Jake Elliott kick), 12:07. Eagles 28–10. **Drive: 4 plays, 50 yards, 1:22.**

**Fourth quarter**

- PHI – Miles Sanders 3-yard run (Jake Elliott kick), 11:27. Eagles 35–10. **Drive: 16 plays, 68 yards, 9:51.**

**Top passers**

- TEN – Ryan Tannehill – 14/22, 141 yards, TD
- PHI – Jalen Hurts – 29/39, 380 yards, 3 TD

**Top rushers**

- TEN – Ryan Tannehill – 3 rushes, 34 yards
- PHI – Miles Sanders – 10 rushes, 24 yards, TD

**Top receivers**

- TEN – Chig Okonkwo – 4 receptions, 68 yards
- PHI – A. J. Brown – 8 receptions, 119 yards, 2 TD

==== Week 14: vs. Jacksonville Jaguars ====
Week 14: Jacksonville Jaguars at Tennessee Titans – Game summary

Quarter	1	2	3	4	Total
**Jaguars**	7	13	13	3	**36**
Titans	14	0	0	8	**22**

at Nissan Stadium, Nashville, Tennessee

- Date: December 11
- Game time: 12:00 p.m. CST
- Game weather: Cloudy, 50 °F (10 °C)
- Game attendance: 68,409
- Referee: Clay Martin
- TV announcers (CBS): Andrew Catalon, James Lofton and Amanda Renner
- Recap, Game Book

Game information

**First quarter**

- TEN – Derrick Henry 3-yard run (Randy Bullock kick), 9:09. Titans 7–0. **Drive: 10 plays, 76 yards, 5:51.**
- JAX – Evan Engram 12-yard pass from Trevor Lawrence (Riley Patterson kick), 6:01. Tied 7–7. **Drive: 3 plays, 20 yards, 0:45.**
- TEN – Chig Okonkwo 10-yard pass from Ryan Tannehill (Randy Bullock kick), 3:03. Titans 14–7. **Drive: 6 plays, 75 yards, 2:58.**

**Second quarter**

- JAX – Riley Patterson 37-yard field goal, 8:52. Titans 14–10. **Drive: 7 plays, 35 yards, 4:04.**
- JAX – Riley Patterson 43-yard field goal, 3:10. Titans 14–13. **Drive: 10 plays, 46 yards, 4:06.**
- JAX – Zay Jones 20-yard pass from Trevor Lawrence (Riley Patterson kick), 0:11. Jaguars 20–14. **Drive: 6 plays, 78 yards, 1:38.**

**Third quarter**

- JAX – Trevor Lawrence 1-yard run (Riley Patterson kick), 7:53. Jaguars 27–14. **Drive: 12 plays, 72 yards, 7:07.**
- JAX – Evan Engram 21-yard pass from Trevor Lawrence (pass failed), 3:07. Jaguars 33–14. **Drive: 5 plays, 63 yards, 2:09.**

**Fourth quarter**

- JAX – Riley Patterson 33-yard field goal, 10:52. Jaguars 36–14. **Drive: 6 plays, 16 yards, 3:12.**
- TEN – Nick Westbrook-Ikhine 2-yard pass from Ryan Tannehill (Ryan Tannehill–Chig Okonkwo pass), 7:15. Jaguars 36–22. **Drive: 10 plays, 64 yards, 3:37.**

**Top passers**

- JAX – Trevor Lawrence – 30/42, 368 yards, 3 TD
- TEN – Ryan Tannehill – 25/38, 254 yards, 2 TD, INT

**Top rushers**

- JAX – Travis Etienne – 17 rushes, 32 yards
- TEN – Derrick Henry – 17 rushes, 121 yards, TD

**Top receivers**

- JAX – Evan Engram – 11 receptions, 162 yards, 2 TD
- TEN – Austin Hooper – 5 receptions, 68 yards

This was the first time that the Titans lost to the Jaguars at home since 2013.

==== Week 15: at Los Angeles Chargers ====
Week 15: Tennessee Titans at Los Angeles Chargers – Game summary

Quarter	1	2	3	4	Total
Titans	0	7	0	7	**14**
**Chargers**	7	0	0	10	**17**

at SoFi Stadium, Inglewood, California

- Date: December 18
- Game time: 3:25 p.m. CST/1:25 p.m. PST
- Game weather: None (retractable roof closed)
- Game attendance: 70,240
- Referee: Land Clark
- TV announcers (CBS): Andrew Catalon, James Lofton and Amanda Renner
- Recap, Game Book

Game information

**First quarter**

- LAC – Joshua Kelley 1-yard run (Cameron Dicker kick), 4:25. Chargers 7–0. **Drive: 14 plays, 68 yards, 8:11.**

**Second quarter**

- TEN – Derrick Henry 4-yard run (Randy Bullock kick), 10:09. Tied 7–7. **Drive: 6 plays, 63 yards, 2:15.**

**Third quarter**

- No scoring plays.

**Fourth quarter**

- LAC – Austin Ekeler 3-yard run (Cameron Dicker kick), 10:28. Chargers 14–7. **Drive: 6 plays, 59 yards, 3:06.**
- TEN – Ryan Tannehill 1-yard run (Randy Bullock kick), 0:48. Tied 14–14. **Drive: 11 plays, 74 yards, 2:09.**
- LAC – Cameron Dicker 43-yard field goal, 0:04. Chargers 17–14. **Drive: 6 plays, 52 yards, 0:44.**

**Top passers**

- TEN – Ryan Tannehill – 15/22, 165 yards, INT
- LAC – Justin Herbert – 28/42, 313 yards, 2 INT

**Top rushers**

- TEN – Derrick Henry – 21 rushes, 104 yards, TD
- LAC – Austin Ekeler – 12 rushes, 58 yards, TD

**Top receivers**

- TEN – Derrick Henry – 4 receptions, 59 yards
- LAC – Keenan Allen – 8 receptions, 86 yards

==== Week 16: vs. Houston Texans ====
Week 16: Houston Texans at Tennessee Titans – Game summary

Quarter	1	2	3	4	Total
**Texans**	7	3	0	9	**19**
Titans	7	0	7	0	**14**

at Nissan Stadium, Nashville, Tennessee

- Date: December 24
- Game time: 1:00 p.m. CST
- Game weather: Clear, 20 °F (−7 °C)
- Game attendance: 66,634
- Referee: Shawn Smith
- TV announcers (CBS): Andrew Catalon, James Lofton and Amanda Renner
- Recap, Game Book

Game information

**First quarter**

- TEN – Derrick Henry 48-yard run (Randy Bullock kick), 8:48. Titans 7–0. **Drive: 5 plays, 60 yards, 3:09.**
- HOU – Rex Burkhead fumble recovery in end zone (Kaʻimi Fairbairn kick), 2:34. Tied 7–7. **Drive: 11 plays, 75 yards, 6:14.**

**Second quarter**

- HOU – Kaʻimi Fairbairn 25-yard field goal, 6:50. Texans 10–7. **Drive: 13 plays, 52 yards, 8:10.**

**Third quarter**

- TEN – Malik Willis 10-yard run (Randy Bullock kick), 8:51. Titans 14–10. **Drive: 6 plays, 52 yards, 3:34.**

**Fourth quarter**

- HOU – Kaʻimi Fairbairn 22-yard field goal, 7:25. Titans 14–13. **Drive: 10 plays, 54 yards, 6:19.**
- HOU – Brandin Cooks 6-yard pass from Davis Mills (pass failed), 2:52. Texans 19–14. **Drive: 5 plays, 73 yards, 2:15.**

**Top passers**

- HOU – Davis Mills – 17/28, 178 yards, TD, INT
- TEN – Malik Willis – 14/23, 99 yards, 2 INT

**Top rushers**

- HOU – Royce Freeman – 16 rushes, 32 yards
- TEN – Derrick Henry – 23 rushes, 126 yards, TD

**Top receivers**

- HOU – Phillip Dorsett – 3 receptions, 45 yards
- TEN – Robert Woods – 4 receptions, 30 yards

The game was delayed an hour due to power outages in Nashville. With a kickoff temperature of 20 °F (−7 °C), this was the coldest game ever played at Nissan Stadium. The Titans were upset by the Texans, who had only one win entering this game. They lost their fifth straight, dropped below .500 for the first time since Week 3, and fell out of first place in the AFC South lead, as they lose the head-to-head tiebreaker to Jacksonville.

==== Week 17: vs. Dallas Cowboys ====
Week 17: Dallas Cowboys at Tennessee Titans – Game summary

Quarter	1	2	3	4	Total
**Cowboys**	7	3	7	10	**27**
Titans	0	6	7	0	**13**

at Nissan Stadium, Nashville, Tennessee

- Date: December 29
- Game time: 7:15 p.m. CST
- Game weather: Rain, 59 °F (15 °C)
- Game attendance: 69,292
- Referee: Shawn Hochuli
- TV announcers (WTVF/Prime Video): Al Michaels, Kirk Herbstreit and Kaylee Hartung
- Recap, Game Book

Game information

**First quarter**

- DAL – Ezekiel Elliott 1-yard run (Brett Maher kick), 4:36. Cowboys 7–0. **Drive: 10 plays, 60 yards, 5:30.**

**Second quarter**

- DAL – Brett Maher 36-yard field goal, 14:56. Cowboys 10–0. **Drive: 8 plays, 47 yards, 3:41.**
- TEN – Randy Bullock 37-yard field goal, 1:04. Cowboys 10–3. **Drive: 8 plays, 45 yards, 2:29.**
- TEN – Randy Bullock 29-yard field goal, 0:00. Cowboys 10–6. **Drive: 2 plays, 30 yards, 0:13.**

**Third quarter**

- DAL – Dalton Schultz 6-yard pass from Dak Prescott (Brett Maher kick), 8:48. Cowboys 17–6. **Drive: 10 plays, 89 yards, 4:35.**
- TEN – Robert Woods 7-yard pass from Joshua Dobbs (Randy Bullock kick), 2:04. Cowboys 17–13. **Drive: 14 plays, 71 yards, 6:44.**

**Fourth quarter**

- DAL – Dalton Schultz 10-yard pass from Dak Prescott (Brett Maher kick), 11:58. Cowboys 24–13. **Drive: 10 plays, 75 yards, 5:06.**
- DAL – Brett Maher 45-yard field goal, 6:24. Cowboys 27–13. **Drive: 7 plays, 53 yards, 3:26.**

**Top passers**

- DAL – Dak Prescott – 29/41, 282 yards, 2 TD, 2 INT
- TEN – Joshua Dobbs – 20/39, 232 yards, TD, INT

**Top rushers**

- DAL – Malik Davis – 10 rushes, 39 yards
- TEN – Hassan Haskins – 12 rushes, 40 yards

**Top receivers**

- DAL – CeeDee Lamb – 11 receptions, 100 yards
- TEN – Treylon Burks – 4 receptions, 66 yards

With this loss, the Titans would have their first losing season since 2015.

==== Week 18: at Jacksonville Jaguars ====
Week 18: Tennessee Titans at Jacksonville Jaguars – Game summary

Quarter	1	2	3	4	Total
Titans	3	10	3	0	**16**
**Jaguars**	0	7	3	10	**20**

at TIAA Bank Field, Jacksonville, Florida

- Date: January 7
- Game time: 8:15 p.m. EST/7:15 p.m. CST
- Game weather: 59 °F (15 °C)
- Game attendance: 70,050
- Referee: Bill Vinovich
- TV announcers (ESPN/ABC): Joe Buck, Troy Aikman and Lisa Salters
- Recap, Game Book

Game information

**First quarter**

- TEN – Randy Bullock 51-yard field goal, 1:23. Titans 3–0. **Drive: 17 plays, 51 yards, 9:59.**

**Second quarter**

- TEN – Chig Okonkwo 21-yard pass from Joshua Dobbs (Randy Bullock kick), 5:32. Titans 10–0. **Drive: 7 play, 69 yards, 3:52.**
- JAX – Christian Kirk 25–yard pass from Trevor Lawrence (Riley Patterson kick), 2:36. Titans 10–7. **Drive: 6 play, 50 yards, 2:56.**
- TEN – Randy Bullock 39-yard field goal, 0:00. Titans 13–7. **Drive: 11 plays, 50 yards, 2:36.**

**Third quarter**

- JAX – Riley Patterson 26-yard field goal, 10:09. Titans 13–10. **Drive: 12 plays, 64 yards, 4:51.**
- TEN – Randy Bullock 41-yard field goal, 6:02. Titans 16–10. **Drive: 10 plays, 45 yards, 4:07.**

**Fourth quarter**

- JAX – Riley Patterson 36-yard field goal, 14:49. Titans 16–13. **Drive: 4 plays, 7 yards, 0:52.**
- JAX – Josh Allen 37-yard fumble return (Riley Patterson kick), 2:51. Jaguars 20–16.

**Top passers**

- TEN – Joshua Dobbs – 20/29, 179 yards, TD, INT
- JAX – Trevor Lawrence – 20/32, 212 yards, TD

**Top rushers**

- TEX – Derrick Henry – 30 rushes, 109 yards
- JAX – Travis Etienne – 7 rushes, 17 yards

**Top receivers**

- TEN – Chig Okonkwo – 3 receptions, 42 yards, TD
- JAX – Christian Kirk – 6 receptions, 99 yards, TD

With their season on the line, the Titans went to Jacksonville to play the 8−8 Jaguars for the AFC South division title. The Titans had a 16−10 lead entering the 4th quarter, but late in the game with the Titans leading 16−13, Joshua Dobbs was strip-sacked by Rayshawn Jenkins, and the fumble was recovered by Josh Allen, who returned it for a 37-yard touchdown to give the Jaguars the lead. The Titans couldn't recover from the fumble, and they lost the game, ending their season. This was the first time the Titans missed the playoffs since 2018, and the first time being swept by the Jaguars since 2005.

=== Standings ===
==== Division ====
AFC South
	W	L	T	PCT	DIV	CONF	PF	PA	STK
^{(4)} Jacksonville Jaguars	9	8	0	.529	4–2	8–4	404	350	W5
Tennessee Titans	7	10	0	.412	3–3	5–7	298	359	L7
Indianapolis Colts	4	12	1	.265	1–4–1	4–7–1	289	427	L7
Houston Texans	3	13	1	.206	3–2–1	3–8–1	289	420	W1

==== Conference ====
AFC
#	Team	Division	W	L	T	PCT	DIV	CONF	SOS	SOV	STK
**Division leaders**
1	Kansas City Chiefs	West	14	3	0	.824	6–0	9–3	.453	.422	W5
2	Buffalo Bills	East	13	3	0	.813	4–2	9–2	.489	.471	W7
3	Cincinnati Bengals	North	12	4	0	.750	3–3	8–3	.507	.490	W8
4	Jacksonville Jaguars	South	9	8	0	.529	4–2	8–4	.467	.438	W5
**Wild cards**
5 (Note: LA Chargers claimed the No. 5 seed over Baltimore based on conference record (7–5 vs. 6–6).)	Los Angeles Chargers	West	10	7	0	.588	2–4	7–5	.443	.341	L1
6	Baltimore Ravens	North	10	7	0	.588	3–3	6–6	.509	.456	L2
7 (Note: Miami finished ahead of Pittsburgh based on head-to-head victory, claiming the 7th and final playoff spot.)	Miami Dolphins	East	9	8	0	.529	3–3	7–5	.537	.457	W1
**Did not qualify for the postseason**
8	Pittsburgh Steelers	North	9	8	0	.529	3–3	5–7	.519	.451	W4
9	New England Patriots	East	8	9	0	.471	3–3	6–6	.502	.415	L1
10 (Note: NY Jets and Tennessee finished ahead of Cleveland based on conference record (5–7 vs. 4–8).) (Note: NY Jets finished ahead of Tennessee based on common record (3–3 vs. 2–4 against: Buffalo, Cincinnati, Denver, Green Bay, Jacksonville).)	New York Jets	East	7	10	0	.412	2–4	5–7	.538	.458	L6
11	Tennessee Titans	South	7	10	0	.412	3–3	5–7	.509	.336	L7
12	Cleveland Browns	North	7	10	0	.412	3–3	4–8	.524	.492	L1
13	Las Vegas Raiders	West	6	11	0	.353	3–3	5–7	.474	.397	L3
14	Denver Broncos	West	5	12	0	.294	1–5	3–9	.481	.465	W1
15	Indianapolis Colts	South	4	12	1	.265	1–4–1	4–7–1	.512	.500	L7
16	Houston Texans	South	3	13	1	.206	3–2–1	3–8–1	.481	.402	W1
**Tiebreakers** (Note: When breaking ties for three or more teams under the NFL's rules, they are first broken within divisions, then comparing only the highest ranked remaining team from each division.)
