= Julius Chestnut =

American football player (born 2000)

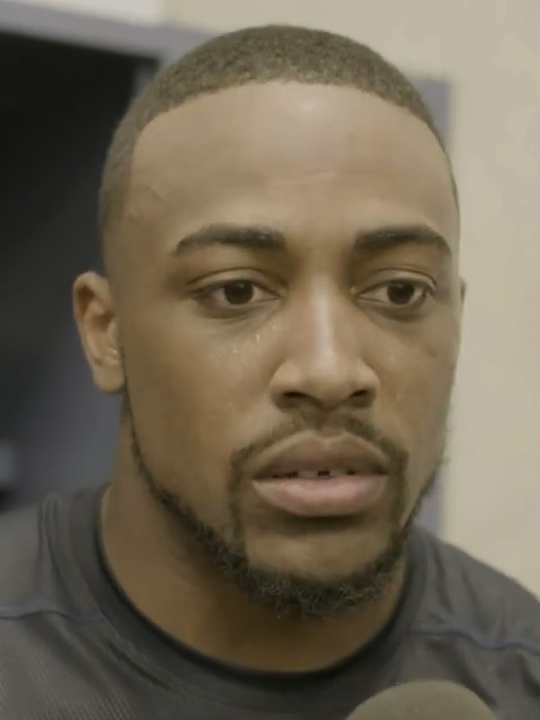
- Chestnut in 2022

No. 36 – Tennessee Titans
- Positions: Running back, kickoff returner
- Roster status: Active

Personal information
- Born: October 26, 2000 (age 26); Bowie, Maryland, U.S.
- Listed height: 5 ft 11 in (1.80 m)
- Listed weight: 228 lb (103 kg)

Career information
- High school: Archbishop Spalding (Severn, Maryland)
- College: Sacred Heart (2018–2021)
- NFL draft: 2022: undrafted

Career history
- Tennessee Titans (2022–present)

Awards and highlights
- AFCA 1st-team All-American (2021); Northeast Conference Offensive Player of the Year (2021); Associated Press FCS 1st-team All-American (2021); Associated Press FCS 3rd-team All-American (2019); 1st-team All-Northeast Conference (2019); Northeast Conference Offensive Rookie of the Year (2018)

Career NFL statistics as of Week 10, 2026
- Rushing yards: 154
- Rushing average: 3.7
- Receptions: 5
- Receiving yards: 52
- Return yards: 633
- Stats at Pro Football Reference

Julius Chestnut (born October 26, 2000) is an American professional football running back and kickoff returner for the Tennessee Titans of the National Football League (NFL). He played college football for the Sacred Heart Pioneers and was signed as an undrafted free agent by the Titans in 2022.

== Professional career ==
Pre-draft measurables
Height	Weight	Arm length	Hand span	Wingspan	40-yard dash	10-yard split	20-yard split	20-yard shuttle	Three-cone drill	Vertical jump	Broad jump	Bench press
5 ft 11 in (1.80 m)	228 lb (103 kg)	29 1/4 in (0.74 m)	9 1/8 in (0.23 m)	6 ft 0 3/4 in (1.85 m)	4.61 s	1.54 s	2.57 s	4.34 s	7.03 s	34.0 in (0.86 m)	9 ft 5 in (2.87 m)	22 reps
All values from Pro Day

Chestnut signed with the Tennessee Titans as an undrafted free agent in 2022. Following the final roster cuts made by the Titans, Chestnut, along with fellow undrafted rookie Tre Avery, made the team. After being inactive the first three games, he was waived on October 1, 2022. He was re-signed to the practice squad on October 4. He was promoted to the active roster on December 17, 2022. He appeared in six games during the 2022 season, making ten kick returns, three rushes, and three receptions for 238 total yards.

Chestnut entered the 2023 season third on the Titans running back depth chart. He suffered a hamstring injury in Week 3 and was placed on injured reserve. He only briefly appeared in three games during the 2023 season.

On March 13, 2024, Chestnut re-signed with the Titans on a one-year contract, once again as the third running back on the depth chart. He made appearances in all 17 games during the 2024 season, recording 102 rushing yards, 11 receiving yards, and 337 kick return yards.

On March 19, 2025, Chestnut re-signed with the Titans on a one-year contract.

On March 17, 2026, Chestnut re-signed with the Titans on a one-year contract. In Week 6 against the Indianapolis Colts, Chestnut had two tackles and a blocked punt in the fourth quarter that was recovered by his teammate Oluwafemi Oladejo for the go-ahead touchdown in the 26-20 win, which was also their first win of the year. For this performance, he was named AFC Special Teams Player of the Week.
