= Andrew Adams (American football) =

American football player (born 1992)

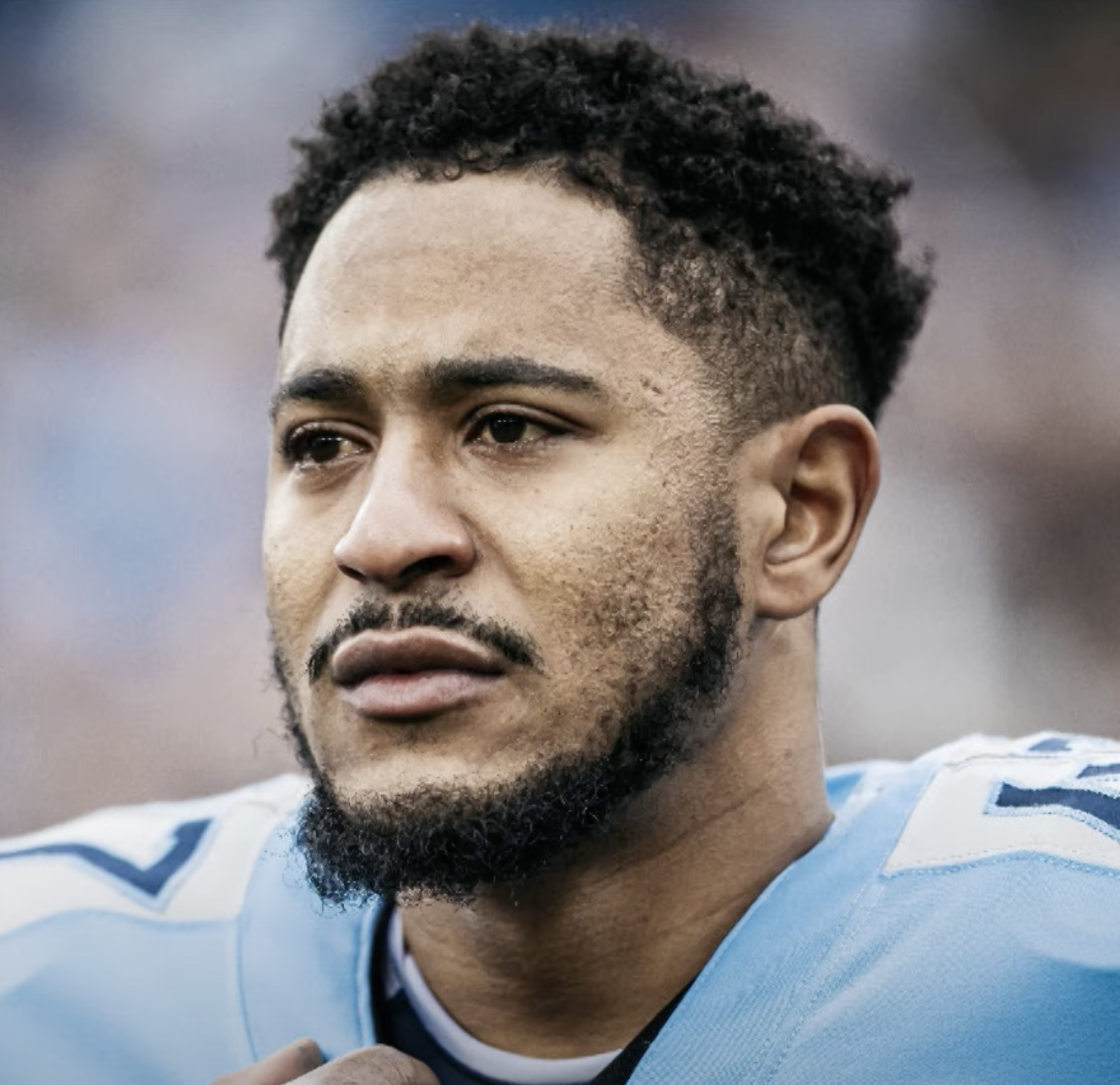
- Adams with the Tennessee Titans in 2022

Profile
- Position: Safety

Personal information
- Born: October 28, 1992 (age 34); Fayetteville, Georgia, U.S.
- Listed height: 5 ft 11 in (1.80 m)
- Listed weight: 205 lb (93 kg)

Career information
- High school: Woodward Academy (College Park, Georgia)
- College: UConn
- NFL draft: 2016: undrafted

Career history
- New York Giants (2016–2017); Tampa Bay Buccaneers (2018); Detroit Lions (2019)*; Tampa Bay Buccaneers (2019–2020); Philadelphia Eagles (2021)*; Tampa Bay Buccaneers (2021); New York Giants (2022)*; Pittsburgh Steelers (2022)*; Tennessee Titans (2022); Baltimore Ravens (2023)
- * Offseason or practice squad member only

Awards and highlights
- Super Bowl champion (LV)

Career NFL statistics
- Total tackles: 252
- Forced fumbles: 2
- Pass deflections: 26
- Interceptions: 8
- Defensive touchdowns: 1
- Stats at Pro Football Reference

Andrew Adams (born October 28, 1992) is an American former professional football player who was a safety in the National Football League (NFL). He played college football for the Connecticut Huskies.

== College career ==
Adams started 33 games throughout his college tenure including all 12 in 2014 and all 13 in 2015. He was one of four captains his senior year with the Huskies. He led the Huskies with 103 tackles, as well as adding three interceptions and seven passes defended in his final season as a Husky.

== Professional career ==
Pre-draft measurables
Height	Weight	Arm length	Hand span	40-yard dash	10-yard split	20-yard split	20-yard shuttle	Three-cone drill	Vertical jump	Broad jump	Bench press
5 ft 11 1/8 in (1.81 m)	201 lb (91 kg)	31 3/4 in (0.81 m)	9 1/4 in (0.23 m)	4.54 s	1.54 s	2.60 s	4.32 s	6.96 s	33 in (0.84 m)	9 ft 10 in (3.00 m)	24 reps
All values from UConn’s Pro Day

=== New York Giants (first stint) ===
==== 2016 ====
On May 1, 2016, the New York Giants signed Adams to a three-year, $1.62 million contract as an undrafted free agent.

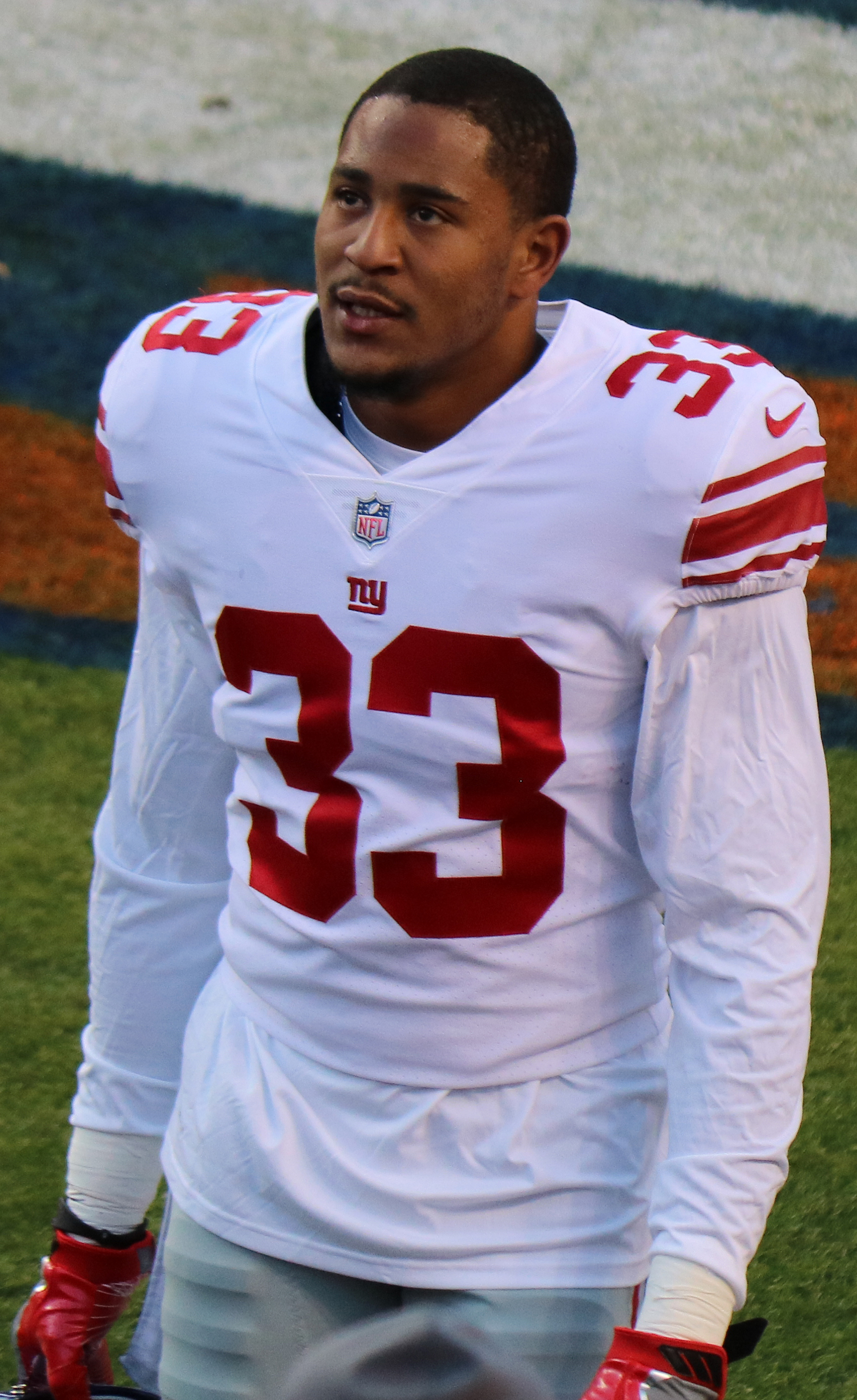
Adams playing for the New York Giants in 2017.

On September 3, 2016, the Giants waived Adams as part of their final roster cuts, but signed him to their practice squad the following day. On September 23, 2016, Adams was promoted from practice squad to the active roster. On September 25, 2016, Adams made one tackle during a 29–27 loss against the Washington Redskins in Week 3. On October 3, 2016, Adams earned his first career start after starting free safety Darian Thompson suffered a foot injury and backup Nat Berhe was inactive due to a concussion. He finished the Giants’ 24–10 loss at the Minnesota Vikings with six combined tackles and one pass deflection. On November 6, 2016, Adams collected a season-high nine combined tackles, deflected two passes, and made his first career interception during a 28–23 win against the Philadelphia Eagles in Week 9. Adams intercepted a pass by Eagles’ quarterback Carson Wentz, that was initially intended for wide receiver Dorial Green-Beckham, and returned it for a 19-yard gain in the first quarter. He finished his rookie season in 2016 with 46 combined tackles (31 solo), five pass deflections, and one interception in 14 games and 13 starts. He received an overall grade of 79.4 from Pro Football Focus, which was the second best grade among rookie safeties in 2016 behind Keanu Neal (80.8).

==== 2017 ====
During training camp, Adams competed to be a starting free safety against Darian Thompson. Head coach Ben McAdoo named Adams the backup free safety, behind Darian Thompson, to start the regular season. In Week 17, he collected a season-high seven solo tackles and deflected a pass during a 18–10 win against the Redskins. On December 4, 2017, the New York Giants fired head coach Ben McAdoo after they fell to a 2–10 record. He finished the 2017 NFL season with 34 solo tackles and two pass deflections in 16 games and four starts.

==== 2018 ====
During training camp, Adams competed against Darian Thompson to be the starting free safety. On September 1, 2018, the New York Giants officially waived Adams.

=== Tampa Bay Buccaneers (first stint) ===
On September 26, 2018, the Tampa Bay Buccaneers signed Adams after placing Chris Conte on injured reserve. Head coach Dirk Koetter named Adams the backup free safety behind Jordan Whitehead. On December 2, 2018, Adams made one tackle, three pass deflections, and made a career-high three interceptions during a 24–17 victory against the Carolina Panthers. In Week 15, Adams collected a season-high seven combined tackles and deflected a pass as the Buccaneers lost 27–20 at the Dallas Cowboys. He finished the season with 38 combined tackles (29 solo), nine pass deflections, and four interceptions in 13 games and four starts.

=== Detroit Lions ===
On March 14, 2019, Adams signed a one-year contract with the Detroit Lions. He was released during final roster cuts on August 30, 2019.

=== Tampa Bay Buccaneers (second stint) ===
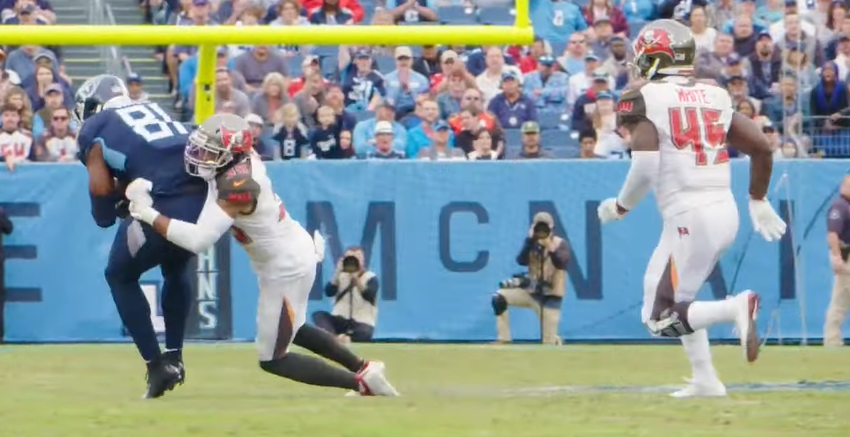
Adams making a tackle in a game against the Tennessee Titans

On September 10, 2019, Adams was signed by the Tampa Bay Buccaneers. In Week 8 against the Tennessee Titans, Adams forced a fumble on Derrick Henry which was recovered by teammate Vernon Hargreaves in the 27–23 loss. In Week 15 against his former team, the Lions, Adams recorded his first interception of the season off rookie quarterback David Blough during the 38–17 win. Overall, in the 2019 season, Adams recorded 45 total tackles, one interception, one forced fumble and three passes defensed in 14 games.

On March 24, 2020, Adams was re-signed to a one-year, $1 million contract. Adams played in all four games in the Buccaneers' playoff run that resulted in the team winning Super Bowl LV.

=== Philadelphia Eagles ===
On March 18, 2021, Adams signed a one-year contract with the Philadelphia Eagles. He was waived on August 31.

=== Tampa Bay Buccaneers (third stint) ===
On September 2, 2021, Adams rejoined the Buccaneers as a member of their practice squad and was signed to the active roster on September 13. He was hit on his helmet by his Coach Bruce Arians after their 31 - 15 playoff win. He was trying to pull a player out of a scrum, Bruce later said, "No, I've seen enough dumb (things). You can't pull guys out of a pile. We just got a big play, great field position, and he's trying to pull a guy out of a pile."

=== New York Giants (second stint) ===
On July 26, 2022, the Giants signed Adams. On August 26, 2022, he was released.

=== Pittsburgh Steelers ===
On September 5, 2022, Adams was signed to the Pittsburgh Steelers practice squad.

=== Tennessee Titans ===
On September 21, 2022, Adams was signed by the Tennessee Titans off the Steelers practice squad. Adams returned an interception from quarterback Matt Ryan for his first career defensive touchdown in a 19–10 Week 7 win over the Indianapolis Colts. On January 2, 2023, Adams was placed on season–ending injured reserve after suffering a torn patellar tendon in Week 17 against the Jacksonville Jaguars.

=== Baltimore Ravens ===
On October 17, 2023, the Baltimore Ravens signed Adams to their practice squad. He was not signed to a reserve/future contract after the season and thus became a free agent when his practice squad contract expired.

== NFL career statistics ==
Legend
	Won the Super Bowl
**Bold**	Career high

=== Regular season ===
Year	Team	Games		Tackles				Fumbles				Interceptions					
Year	Team	GP	GS	Cmb	Solo	Ast	Sck	FF	FR	Yds	TD	Int	Yds	Avg	Lng	TD	PD
2016	NYG	14	**13**	46	31	15	0.0	0	0	0	0	1	19	19.0	19	0	5
2017	NYG	**16**	4	34	34	0	0.0	**1**	0	0	0	0	0	0.0	0	0	2
2018	TB	13	4	38	29	9	0.0	0	0	0	0	**4**	34	6.0	16	0	**9**
2019	TB	14	11	46	41	5	0.0	**1**	0	0	0	1	21	21.0	21	0	3
2020	TB	**16**	0	2	1	1	0.0	0	0	0	0	0	0	0.0	0	0	0
2021	TB	14	3	24	16	8	0.0	0	0	0	0	1	17	17.0	17	0	4
2022	TEN	13	11	**62**	**44**	**18**	0.0	0	0	0	0	1	**76**	**76.0**	**76**	**1**	3
2023	BAL	3	0	0	0	0	0	0	0	0	0	0	0	0	0	0	0
Career		103	46	252	196	56	0.0	2	0	0	0	8	167	20.9	76	1	26

=== Buccaneers franchise records ===
- Most interceptions in a game – 3 (tied with Ronde Barber and Aqib Talib) (December 2, 2018 vs Carolina Panthers)

== Personal life ==
Adams is the nephew of retired guard, Sam Adams Sr. and cousins with his son, former defensive tackle Sam Adams. He is also the cousin of retired running back, Matt Forte. Adams' brother-in-law is linebacker Alec Ogletree.
