= Tre Avery =

American football player (born 1997)

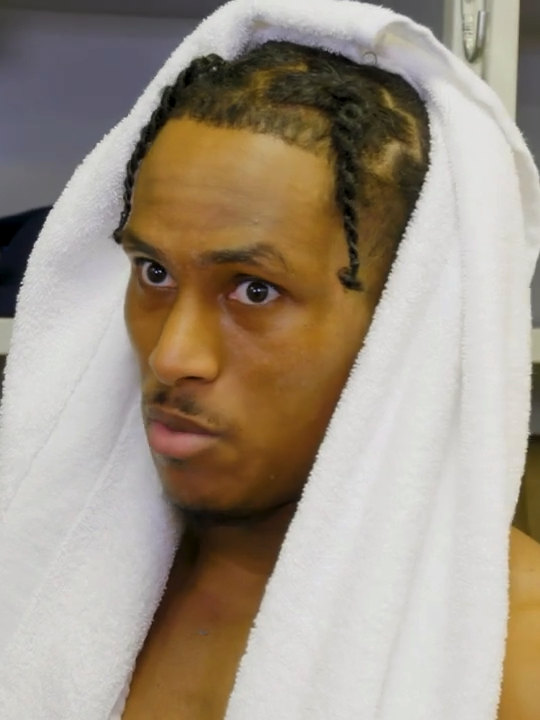
- Avery in 2022

Profile
- Position: Cornerback

Personal information
- Born: February 26, 1997 (age 29); Baltimore, Maryland, U.S.
- Listed height: 5 ft 11 in (1.80 m)
- Listed weight: 185 lb (84 kg)

Career information
- High school: St. Frances (Baltimore); Franklin (Reisterstown, Maryland)
- College: Rutgers (2017–2021)
- NFL draft: 2022: undrafted

Career history
- Tennessee Titans (2022–2024); San Francisco 49ers (2024); New England Patriots (2025)*; Tampa Bay Buccaneers (2025)*; Cleveland Browns (2025)
- * Offseason or practice squad member only

Awards and highlights
- Third-team All-Big Ten (2020)

Career NFL statistics as of 2025
- Total tackles: 78
- Fumble recoveries: 1
- Pass deflections: 11
- Stats at Pro Football Reference

Tre Avery (born February 26, 1997) is an American professional football cornerback. He played college football for the Rutgers Scarlet Knights.

== Early life ==
Avery grew up in Baltimore, Maryland and attended St. Francis Academy in Baltimore, Maryland, and Franklin High School.

== College career ==
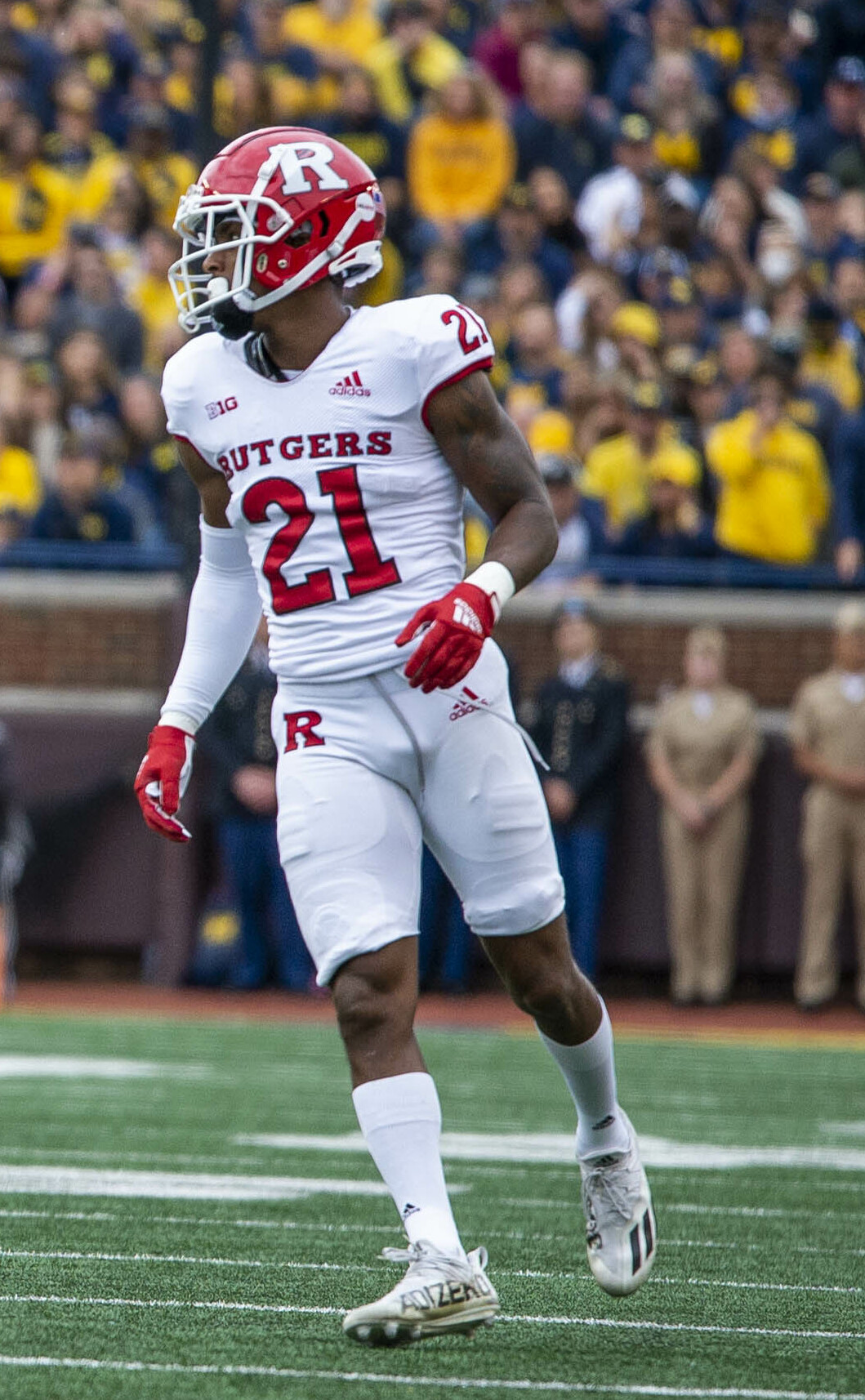
Avery with Rutgers in 2021

On May 3, 2015, Avery committed to play football at Ohio State, but transferred to Toledo after an eligibility issue at Ohio State, redshirting there before transferring a second time to Rutgers.

== Professional career ==
Pre-draft measurables
Height	Weight	Arm length	Hand span	Wingspan	40-yard dash	10-yard split	20-yard split	20-yard shuttle	Three-cone drill	Vertical jump	Broad jump	Bench press
5 ft 10 1/2 in (1.79 m)	181 lb (82 kg)	29 5/8 in (0.75 m)	8 5/8 in (0.22 m)	5 ft 11 7/8 in (1.83 m)	4.45 s	1.56 s	2.58 s	4.01 s	6.76 s	38.0 in (0.97 m)	10 ft 3 in (3.12 m)	16 reps
All values from Pro Day

=== Tennessee Titans ===
On May 13, 2022, Avery signed with the Tennessee Titans as an undrafted free agent, and made the 53-man roster to start the regular season following final cuts. He played 14 games during the 2022 season, making 29 total tackles, nine pass deflections, and a fumble recovery.

Avery played 15 games during the 2023 season, making 33 total tackles and two pass deflections.

Avery was waived by the Titans on August 27, 2024, and re-signed to the practice squad. He was elevated to the active roster on October 15. Avery appeared in nine games during the 2024 season, making three tackles on special teams. He was released on December 28, 2024.

=== San Francisco 49ers ===
On December 30, 2024, the San Francisco 49ers claimed Avery off waivers from the Titans.

On August 4, 2025, Avery was waived by the 49ers.

=== New England Patriots ===
On August 5, 2025, Avery was claimed off waivers by the New England Patriots. He was released on August 19.

=== Tampa Bay Buccaneers ===
On August 22, 2025, Avery signed with the Tampa Bay Buccaneers. He was waived on August 26 as part of final roster cuts.

=== Cleveland Browns ===
On September 16, 2025, Avery signed with the Cleveland Browns' practice squad. He was signed to the active roster on October 14. On November 11, Avery was waived and re-signed to the practice squad two days later. On December 10, he was signed to the active roster.

On March 17, 2026, Avery re-signed with the Browns. On August 28, he was released by the Browns as a part of final roster cuts.

== NFL career statistics ==
Legend
**Bold**	Career high

=== Regular season ===
Year	Team	Games		Tackles					Interceptions						Fumbles				
Year	Team	GP	GS	Cmb	Solo	Ast	Sck	TFL	Int	Yds	Avg	Lng	TD	PD	FF	Fum	FR	Yds	TD
2022	TEN	14	3	29	23	6	0.0	1	0	0	0.0	0	0	**9**	0	0	**1**	0	0
2023	TEN	15	2	**33**	**28**	5	0.0	**2**	0	0	0.0	0	0	2	0	0	0	0	0
2024	TEN	9	0	3	3	0	0.0	0	0	0	0.0	0	0	0	0	0	0	0	0
2025	CLE	10	0	13	6	**7**	0.0	0	0	0	0.0	0	0	0	0	0	0	0	0
Career		48	5	78	60	18	0.0	3	0	0	0.0	0	0	11	0	0	1	0	0
