= Andrew Rupcich =

American football player (born 1999)

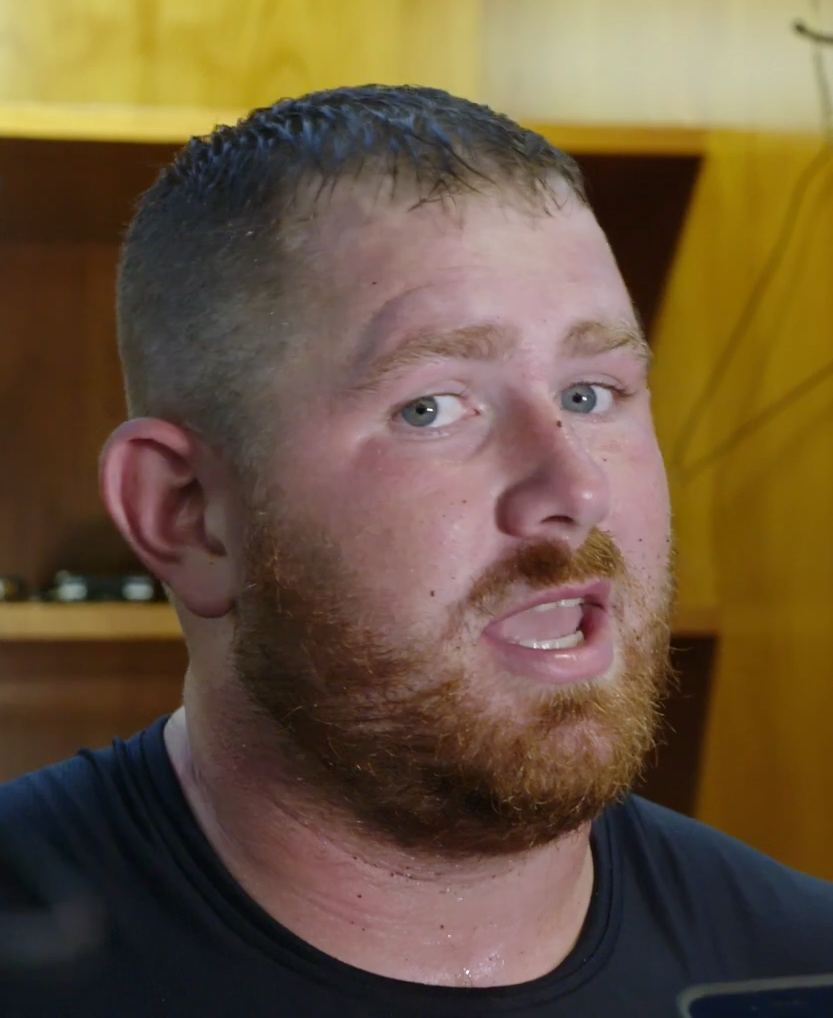
- Rupcich in 2024

No. 67 – New England Patriots
- Position: Guard
- Roster status: Practice squad

Personal information
- Born: April 1, 1999 (age 27); Wonder Lake, Illinois, U.S.
- Listed height: 6 ft 6 in (1.98 m)
- Listed weight: 325 lb (147 kg)

Career information
- High school: McHenry (McHenry, Illinois)
- College: Culver–Stockton (2017–2021)
- NFL draft: 2022: undrafted

Career history
- Tennessee Titans (2022–2025); New England Patriots (2025–present)

Career NFL statistics as of Week 10, 2026
- Games played: 13
- Games started: 2
- Stats at Pro Football Reference

Andrew Rupcich (born April 1, 1999) is an American professional football guard for the New England Patriots of the National Football League (NFL). He played college football for the Culver–Stockton Wildcats and was signed by the Titans as an undrafted free agent in 2022.

== Early life and education ==
Rupcich was born on April 1, 1999, in Wonder Lake, Illinois. He attended McHenry High School, where he played both basketball and football. On the gridiron he was a two-way lineman, and he was selected all-conference at right tackle as a senior. Qualifying for college late, he signed to play college football with the Culver–Stockton Wildcats of the National Association of Intercollegiate Athletics (NAIA) rather than try junior college football or be a walk-on at a higher level.

== College career ==
Rupcich gained a starting role at left tackle as a freshman in 2017 and went on to play every snap for the rest of his collegiate career. He started all 11 games in 2017 and did the same in 2018 while being named first-team All-Heart of America Athletic Conference (HAAC) North Division. He was named the school's athlete of the year in 2018. In 2019, he started all 11 games at left tackle and was chosen first-team All-HAAC North Division for the second time in a row, being the first repeat player to earn the honors at Culver–Stockton since 2014 while helping Culver–Stockton have its first winning season since 2001. He was also chosen a first-team All-American by the American Football Coaches Association (AFCA), being the fifth All-American in school history and the first since 2007. Rupcich also gained notice that year for throwing a 44-yard pass and was given the Banner Society Piesman Award for it.

Rupcich started all four games at left tackle in the COVID-19-shortened 2020 season, being first-team AFCA All-American and first-team All-HAAC North Division. He became Culver–Stockton's first two-time All-American. After returning for a final year in 2021, he started all 11 games and was first-team All-American from Associated Press, the NAIA and the AFCA while also being first-team All-HAAC North Division. He ended his collegiate career having appeared in and started all 48 games in five seasons while missing no snaps, being the first player in NAIA history to be named first-team All-American at the same position three times. He was described by NFL analyst Dane Brugler as "Overall ... one of the best offensive linemen to ever come from the NAIA level," and Rupcich was both the only NAIA player to be invited to the NFLPA Collegiate Bowl and to the NFL Scouting Combine. He graduated in December 2021 with a degree in physical education and health and was also invited to play at the College Gridiron Showcase and the Hula Bowl.

== Professional career ==
Pre-draft measurables
Height	Weight	Arm length	Hand span	Wingspan	40-yard dash	10-yard split	20-yard split	20-yard shuttle	Three-cone drill	Vertical jump	Broad jump	Bench press
6 ft 6 in (1.98 m)	318 lb (144 kg)	32 7/8 in (0.84 m)	9 1/2 in (0.24 m)	6 ft 5 3/8 in (1.97 m)	5.31 s	1.85 s	3.07 s	4.90 s	7.95 s	31.0 in (0.79 m)	9 ft 0 in (2.74 m)	25 reps
All values from NFL Combine/Pro Day

=== Tennessee Titans ===
After going unselected in the 2022 NFL draft, Rupcich was signed by the Tennessee Titans as an undrafted free agent. He was released at the final roster cuts, on August 30, and was re-signed to the practice squad the following day. He did not appear in any games in his first season, spending the entire year on the practice squad as the Titans finished with a record of 7–10.

Rupcich signed a reserve/future contract on January 23, 2023. He was released at the final roster cuts on August 29, 2023, and then re-signed to the practice squad the following day. Rupcich was elevated to the active roster for the team's Week 10 game against the Tampa Bay Buccaneers, and made his debut in the 20–6 loss, appearing on 45 offensive snaps and three special teams snaps after coming in at right guard for the injured Andre Dillard. He became the third Culver–Stockton NFL player in history, following Bob Hendren (1949–1951) and Jason Kaiser (1998–1999). Rupcich was signed to the 53-man roster on December 23. He finished the season having appeared in five games, two as a starter.

Rupcich appeared in the first seven games of the 2024 season, playing 16 offensive snaps as a rotational right guard and 22 snaps on special teams, but unfortunately suffered a season-ending tricep tear during a Week 8 game against the Detroit Lions. He was placed on injured reserve on November 2, and was later ruled out for the year.

On August 26, 2025, Rupcich was waived by the Titans as part of final roster cuts and was re-signed to the practice squad the next day. On September 29, he was released.

=== New England Patriots ===
On September 30, 2025, Rupcich signed with the New England Patriots' practice squad. On February 11, 2026, he signed a reserve/futures contract with New England.

On August 15, 2026, Rupcich was placed on injured reserve. On August 20, Rupcich was waived by the Patriots with an injury settlement. He re-signed to the practice squad on October 19.
