= Thomas Odukoya =

Dutch gridiron football player (born 1997)

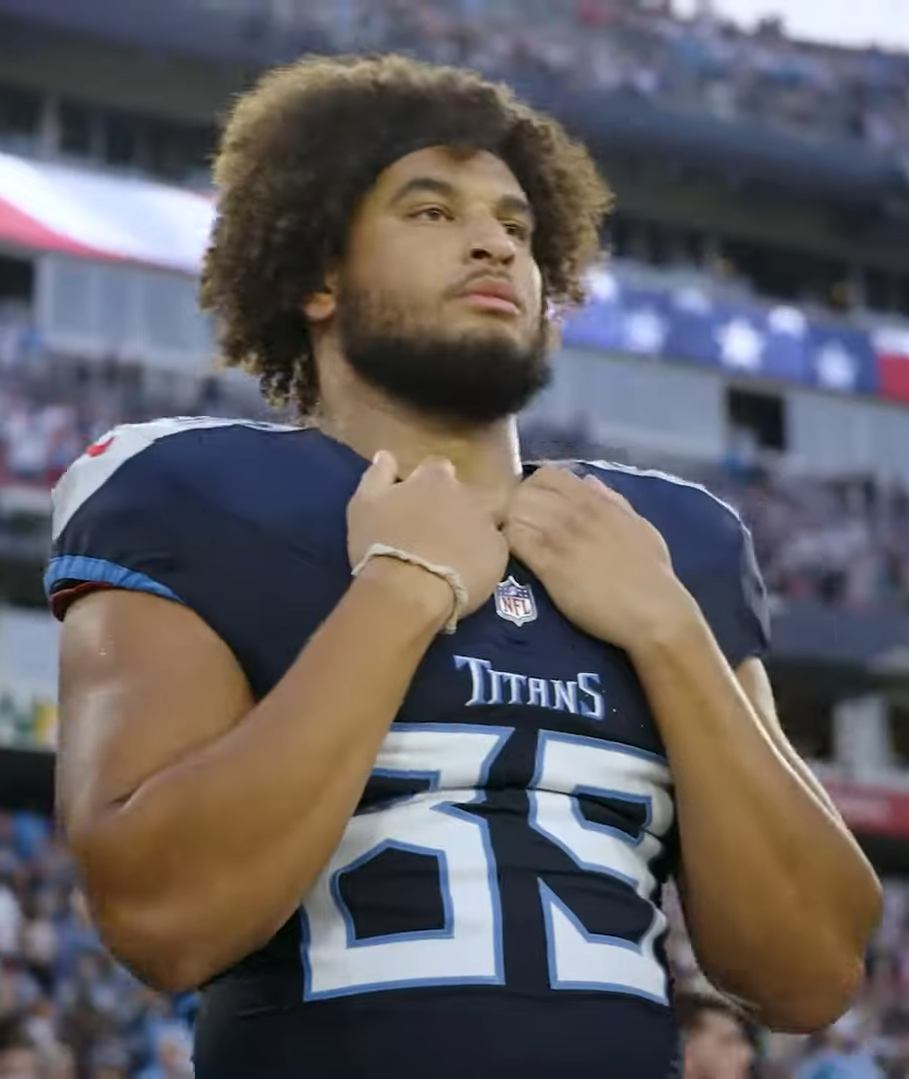
- Odukoya with the Tennessee Titans in 2023

No. 81 – Kansas City Chiefs
- Position: Tight end
- Roster status: Practice squad

Personal information
- Born: May 5, 1997 (age 29); Amsterdam, Netherlands
- Listed height: 6 ft 6 in (1.98 m)
- Listed weight: 253 lb (115 kg)

Career information
- High school: Helen Parkhurst (Netherlands)
- College: West Hills–Coalinga (2016); Garden City (2017); Eastern Michigan (2018–2021)
- NFL draft: 2022: undrafted
- CFL draft: 2022G: 2nd round, 18th overall pick

Career history
- Tennessee Titans (2022–2025); New England Patriots (2025)*; Kansas City Chiefs (2026–present)*
- * Offseason or practice squad member only

Awards and highlights
- Third-team All-MAC (2021)

Career NFL statistics as of 2025
- Games played: 2
- Stats at Pro Football Reference

Thomas Ayodele Odukoya (born May 5, 1997) is a Dutch professional American football tight end for the Kansas City Chiefs of the National Football League (NFL). From the Netherlands, he played college football at West Hills–Coalinga, Garden City and Eastern Michigan and joined the Tennessee Titans as part of the International Player Pathway Program (IPPP) in 2022. He has also been a member of the New England Patriots.

== Early life ==
Odukoya was born on May 5, 1997, in Amsterdam and raised in Almere. He was born to a Dutch mother and Nigerian father. He grew up playing association football (soccer) but left the sport before high school. At age 16, he was brought to a practice of the Flevo Phantoms American football team and "fell immediately in love" with the sport for what he called "the sheer violence of the game and just the physicality of it."

Odukoya played three seasons in two years for the Phantoms, a nine-man team, while attending Helen Parkhurst High School. He normally played for the Phantoms at defensive end and offensive lineman. He recorded 22 sacks in one season and was named the Dutch national most valuable player, also being selected to play for the Netherlands national American football team.

== College career ==
Wanting to play football in the United States, Odukoya looked for opportunities to play college football for a year, uploading a YouTube highlight video of himself and joining a Facebook group devoted to helping foreign players earn athletic scholarships. He realized he needed to start at a junior college as he had not taken SAT or ACT tests. He joined West Hills College Coalinga in California for the 2016 season and was transitioned to playing tight end. He recorded 15 receptions for 184 yards and two touchdowns, being named all-conference.

Odukoya transferred to Garden City Community College in Kansas in 2017, but broke his foot in the second game of the season and redshirted. He was able to join the FBS Eastern Michigan Eagles in 2018 and ended up playing four seasons for them. Mainly used as a blocker, he played eight games for Eastern Michigan in 2018 before appearing in 13 games in 2019, six in 2020, and 13 in his final season, 2021. He was named team captain as a senior in 2021 and was selected third-team all-conference after posting 13 catches for 130 yards and two touchdowns. Odukoya finished his stint at Eastern Michigan with 40 games played and 21 catches for 194 yards and four touchdowns, being invited to the Hula Bowl all-star game at the conclusion of his college career.

== Professional career ==
Pre-draft measurables
Height	Weight	Arm length	Hand span	Wingspan	40-yard dash	10-yard split	20-yard split	Vertical jump	Broad jump
6 ft 5 1/2 in (1.97 m)	253 lb (115 kg)	33 in (0.84 m)	9 3/4 in (0.25 m)	6 ft 9 1/2 in (2.07 m)	4.91 s	1.77 s	2.87 s	32.0 in (0.81 m)	9 ft 8 in (2.95 m)
All values from Pro Day

=== Tennessee Titans ===
After going unselected in the 2022 NFL draft, Odukoya joined the Tennessee Titans as part of the International Player Pathway Program (IPPP). On January 10, 2023, Odukoya signed a reserve/future contract with the Titans.

In the 2023 offseason, Odukoya received praise from head coach Mike Vrabel saying that they "lucked out" in finding him. On August 29, 2023, he was waived for final roster cuts before the start of the regular season, but signed with the practice squad the following day. Following the end of the season, the Titans signed him to a reserve/future contract on January 8, 2024.

In the Titans' 2024 preseason finale against the New Orleans Saints, Odukoya made a touchdown-saving tackle on Saints returner Samson Nacua, with Fox News noting that he "appeared to run more than 150 yards in total" to make the play. Afterwards, the Titans announced on August 27 that he had made the team's 53-man roster for the 2024 season. This put him in a position to be the first Dutch-born NFL player in 24 years. He made his NFL debut in the special teams, in Week 7 when the Titans faced the Buffalo Bills in the Highmark Stadium. He was waived on November 2, and re-signed to the practice squad. On December 7, Odukoya was a standard gameday elevation to play special teams in the game against the Jacksonville Jaguars. On December 15, he was elevated again, and played special teams and offense against the Cincinnati Bengals. He signed a reserve/future contract with Tennessee on January 6, 2025.

On August 26, 2025, Odukoya was waived by the Titans as part of final roster cuts and re-signed to the practice squad the next day. He was promoted to the active roster on October 11 and waived three days later.

=== New England Patriots ===
On October 16, 2025, Odukoya signed with the New England Patriots' practice squad.

=== Kansas City Chiefs ===
On September 5, 2026, Odukoya signed with the Kansas City Chiefs' practice squad.
